= Lega Basket Serie A awards =

Italian basketball awards

The Lega Basket Serie A awards are the yearly individual awards that are given by Italy's top-tier professional basketball league, the Lega Basket Serie A (LBA).

In 2015, the awardees were chosen by a panel of journalists along with one of the head coaches, general manager and captains of each the 16 teams in the league.

== LBA MVP ==
- Player nationalities by national team.

Season	Winner	Club(s)
1993–94	(Italy) Carlton Myers	Scavolini Pesaro
1994–95	(Italy) Stefano Rusconi	Benetton Treviso
1995–96	(United States) Henry Williams	Benetton Treviso
1996–97	(Italy) Carlton Myers (2)	Teamsystem Bologna
1997–98	(Federal Republic of Yugoslavia) Sasha Danilović	Kinder Bologna
1998–99	(Italy) Vincenzo Esposito	Andrea Costa Imola
1999–00	(Italy) Vincenzo Esposito (2)	Andrea Costa Imola
2000–01	(Argentina) Manu Ginóbili	Kinder Bologna
2001–02	(Argentina) Manu Ginóbili (2)	Kinder Bologna
2002–03	(Italy) Massimo Bulleri	Benetton Treviso
2003–04	(Italy) Gianluca Basile	Skipper Bologna
2004–05	(Italy) Massimo Bulleri (2)	Benetton Treviso
2005–06	(United States) Lynn Greer	Carpisa Napoli
2006–07	(United States) Terrell McIntyre	Montepaschi Siena
2007–08	(Italy) Danilo Gallinari	Armani Jeans Milano
2008–09	(United States) Terrell McIntyre (2)	Montepaschi Siena
2009–10	(Central African Republic) Romain Sato	Montepaschi Siena
2010–11	(United States) Omar Thomas	Air Avellino
2011–12	(North Macedonia) Bo McCalebb	Montepaschi Siena
2012–13	(Italy) Luigi Datome	Acea Roma
2013–14	(United States) Drake Diener	Banco di Sardegna Sassari
2014–15	(United States) Tony Mitchell	Dolomiti Energia Trento
2015–16	(United States) James Nunnally	Sidigas Avellino
2016–17	(United States) Marcus Landry	Germani Brescia
2017–18	(United States) Jason Rich	Sidigas Avellino
2018–19	(United States) Drew Crawford	Vanoli Cremona
2019–20	Not awarded due to the COVID-19 pandemic	
2020–21	(Italy) Stefano Tonut	Reyer Venezia
2021–22	(Italy) Amedeo Della Valle	Basket Brescia Leonessa
2022–23	(United States) Colbey Ross	Openjobmetis Varese
2023–24	(Italy) Marco Belinelli	Virtus Bologna
2024–25	(Croatia) Miro Bilan	Pallacanestro Brescia
2025–26	(United States) Armoni Brooks	Olimpia Milano

== LBA Finals MVP ==
- Player nationalities by national team.

Season	Winner	Club(s)
2003–04	(Australia) David Andersen	Montepaschi Siena
2004–05	(Italy) Gianluca Basile	Climamio Bologna
2005–06	(Lithuania) Ramūnas Šiškauskas	Benetton Treviso
2006–07	(Lithuania) Rimantas Kaukėnas	Montepaschi Siena
2007–08	(United States) Terrell McIntyre	Montepaschi Siena
2008–09	(United States) Terrell McIntyre (2)	Montepaschi Siena
2009–10	(United States) Terrell McIntyre (3)	Montepaschi Siena
2010–11	(North Macedonia) Bo McCalebb	Montepaschi Siena
2011–12	(North Macedonia) Bo McCalebb (2)	Montepaschi Siena
2012–13	(Italy) Daniel Hackett	Montepaschi Siena
2013–14	(Italy) Alessandro Gentile	EA7 Emporio Armani Milano
2014–15	(United States) Rakim Sanders	Banco di Sardegna Sassari
2015–16	(United States) Rakim Sanders (2)	EA7 Emporio Armani Milano
2016–17	(Canada) Melvin Ejim	Umana Venezia
2017–18	(United States) Andrew Goudelock	EA7 Emporio Armani Milano
2018–19	(United States) Austin Daye	Umana Reyer Venezia
2019–20	Not awarded due to the COVID-19 pandemic	
2020–21	(Serbia) Miloš Teodosić	Virtus Segafredo Bologna
2021–22	(Denmark) Shavon Shields	Olimpia Milano
2022–23	(Italy) Luigi Datome	Olimpia Milano
2023–24	(Spain) Nikola Mirotic	Olimpia Milano
2024–25	(Georgia (country)) Tornike Shengelia	Virtus Bologna

== LBA Best Player Under 22 ==
- Player nationalities by national team.

Season	Player	Club(s)
2005–06	(Italy) Andrea Bargnani	Benetton Treviso
2006–07	(Italy) Danilo Gallinari	Armani Jeans Milano
2007–08	(Italy) Danilo Gallinari (2)	Armani Jeans Milano
2008–09	(Italy) Luigi Datome	Lottomatica Roma
2009–10	(Italy) Pietro Aradori	Lauretana Biella
2010–11	(Italy) Alessandro Gentile	Benetton Treviso
2011–12	(Italy) Achille Polonara	Bancatercas Teramo
2012–13	(Italy) Achille Polonara (2)	Cimberio Varèse
2013–14	(Italy) Alessandro Gentile (2)	EA7 Emporio Armani Milano
2014–15	(Italy) Simone Fontecchio	Granarolo Bologna
2015–16	(Italy) Diego Flaccadori	Dolomiti Energia Trento
2016–17	(Italy) Diego Flaccadori (2)	Dolomiti Energia Trento
2017–18	(Italy) Diego Flaccadori (3)	Dolomiti Energia Trento
2018–19	(United States) Tony Carr	Red October Cantù
2020–21	(Italy) Alessandro Pajola	Virtus Bologna
2021–22	(Italy) Matteo Spagnolo	Vanoli Cremona
2022–23	(Italy) Matteo Spagnolo (2)	Dolomiti Energia Trento
2023–24	(Senegal) Mouhamed Faye	UNAHOTELS Reggio Emilia
2024–25	(United Kingdom) Quinn Ellis	Dolomiti Energia Trento
2025–26	(Italy) Saliou Niang	Virtus Bologna

== LBA Best Coach ==
Season	Winner	Club(s)
1993–94	(Italy) Franco Marcelletti	Glaxo Verona
1994–95	(Italy) Edoardo Rusconi	Cagiva Varèse
1995–96	(Italy) Attilio Caja	Nuova Tirrenia Roma
1996–97	(Italy) Andrea Mazzon	Mash Jeans Verona
1997–98	(Italy) Ettore Messina	Kinder Bologna
1998–99	(Italy) Carlo Recalcati	Varèse Roosters
1999–00	(Italy) Piero Bucchi	Benetton Treviso
2000–01	(Italy) Ettore Messina (2)	Kinder Bologna
2001–02	(Italy) Stefano Sacripanti	Oregon Scientific Cantù
2002–03	(Italy) Lino Lardo	Reggio Calabria
2003–04	(Italy) Carlo Recalcati (2)	Montepaschi Siena
2004–05	(Italy) Ettore Messina (3)	Benetton Treviso
2005–06	(Italy) Cesare Pancotto	Snaidero Udine
2006–07	(Italy) Simone Pianigiani	Montepaschi Siena
2007–08	(Italy) Matteo Boniciolli	Air Avellino
2008–09	(Italy) Andrea Capobianco	Bancatercas Teramo
2009–10	(Italy) Andrea Trinchieri	NGC Medical Cantù
2010–11	(Italy) Andrea Trinchieri (2)	Bennet Cantù
2011–12	(Italy) Romeo Sacchetti	Banco di Sardegna Sassari
2012–13	(Italy) Francesco Vitucci	Cimberio Varèse
2013–14	(Italy) Paolo Moretti	Giorgio Tesi Group Pistoia
2014–15	(Italy) Maurizio Buscaglia	Dolomiti Energia Trento
2015–16	(Italy) Cesare Pancotto (2)	Vanoli Cremona
2016–17	(Italy) Vincenzo Esposito	The Flexx Pistoia
2017–18	(Italy) Attilio Caja (2)	Openjobmetis Varese
2018–19	(Italy) Romeo Sacchetti (2)	Vanoli Cremona
2020–21	(Italy) Francesco Vitucci (2)	New Basket Brindisi
2021–22	(Italy) Alessandro Magro	Basket Brescia Leonessa
2022–23	(Italy) Marco Ramondino	Bertram Yachts Derthona Tortona
2023–24	(Italy) Nicola Brienza	Estra Pistoia
2024–25	(Italy) Paolo Galbiati	Dolomiti Energia Trentino
2025–26	(Greece) Dimitrios Priftis	Pallacanestro Reggiana

== LBA Best Executive ==
Season	Winner	Club(s)
2005–06	(Italy) Maurizio Gherardini	Benetton Treviso
2006–07	(Italy) Ferdinando Minucci	Montepaschi Siena
2007–08	(Italy) Ferdinando Minucci (2)	Montepaschi Siena
2008–09	(Italy) Ferdinando Minucci (3)	Montepaschi Siena
2009–10	(Italy) Bruno Arrigoni	NGC Medical Cantù
2010–11	(Italy) Bruno Arrigoni (2)	Bennet Cantù
2011–12	(Italy) Federico Casarin	Umana Venezia
2012–13	(Italy) Alessandro Della Salda	Trenkwalder Reggio Emilia
2013–14	(Italy) Alessandro Giuliani	Enel Brindisi
2014–15	(Italy) Salvatore Trainotti	Dolomiti Energia Trento
2015–16	(Italy) Nicola Alberani	Sidigas Avellino
2016–17	(Italy) Peppe Sindoni	Betaland Capo d'Orlando
2017–18	(Italy) Federico Casarin	Umana Reyer Venezia
2018–19	(Italy) Simone Giofré	New Basket Brindisi
2020–21	(Italy) Simone Giofré (2)	New Basket Brindisi
2021–22	(Italy) Marco De Benedetto	Germani Brescia
2022–23	(Italy) Micheal Arceri	Openjobmetis Varese
2023–24	(Italy) Massimo Capecchi	Estra Pistoia
2024–25	(Italy) Andrea Nardelli	Dolomiti Energia Trentino
2025–26	(Italy) Marco Sambugaro	Pallacanestro Reggiana
