= List of Italian basketball champions =

The Italian basketball champions are the annual winners of the highest basketball competition in Italy. The winner of the Lega Basket Serie A (LBA) is crowned Italian champion.

Olimpia Milano hold the record for the most championships with 28.

== Finals (1976–present) ==
In the 1976–77 season, play-offs were introduced to determine the national champion.

†	Champion also won the Italian Cup
‡	Champion also won the Italian Cup and Supercup

Season	Champion	Score	Runner–up	Champions' coach	Finals MVP
1976–77	Mobilgirgi Varese	2–0	Sinudyne Bologna	(Italy) Sandro Gamba	—
1977–78	Mobilgirgi Varese	2–1	Sinudyne Bologna	(Italy) Nico Messina	—
1978–79	Sinudyne Bologna	2–0	Billy Milano	(United States) Terry Driscoll	—
1979–80	Sinudyne Bologna	2–0	Gabetti Cantù	(United States) Terry Driscoll	—
1980–81	Squibb Cantù	2–1	Sinudyne Bologna	(Italy) Valerio Bianchini	—
1981–82	Billy Milano	2–0	Scavolini Pesaro	(United States) Dan Peterson	—
1982–83	Banco Roma	2–1	Billy Milano	(Italy) Valerio Bianchini	—
1983–84	Granarolo Bologna †	2–1	Simac Milano	(Italy) Alberto Bucci	—
1984–85	Simac Milano	2–0	Scavolini Pesaro	(United States) Dan Peterson	—
1985–86	Simac Milano †	2–1	Mobilgirgi Caserta	(United States) Dan Peterson	—
1986–87	Tracer Milano †	3–0	Mobilgirgi Caserta	(United States) Dan Peterson	—
1987–88	Scavolini Pesaro	3–1	Tracer Milano	(Italy) Valerio Bianchini	—
1988–89	Philips Milano	3–2	Enichem Livorno	(Italy) Franco Casalini	—
1989–90	Scavolini Pesaro	3–2	Antifurti Ranger Varese	(Italy) Sergio Scariolo	—
1990–91	Phonola Caserta	3–2	Philips Milano	(Italy) Franco Marcelletti	—
1991–92	Benetton Treviso	3–1	Scavolini Pesaro	(Croatia) Petar Skansi	—
1992–93	Knorr Bologna	3–0	Benetton Treviso	(Italy) Ettore Messina	—
1993–94	Buckler Beer Bologna	3–2	Scavolini Pesaro	(Italy) Alberto Bucci	—
1994–95	Buckler Beer Bologna	3–0	Benetton Treviso	(Italy) Alberto Bucci	—
1995–96	Stefanel Milano †	3–1	Teamsystem Bologna	(Federal Republic of Yugoslavia) Bogdan Tanjević	—
1996–97	Benetton Treviso	3–2	Teamsystem Bologna	(United States) Mike D'Antoni	—
1997–98	Kinder Bologna	3–2	Teamsystem Bologna	(Italy) Ettore Messina	—
1998–99	Varese Roosters	3–0	Benetton Treviso	(Italy) Carlo Recalcati	—
1999–00	Paf Wennington Bologna	3–1	Benetton Treviso	(Italy) Carlo Recalcati	—
2000–01	Kinder Bologna †	3–0	Paf Wennington Bologna	(Italy) Ettore Messina	—
2001–02	Benetton Treviso	3–0	Skipper Bologna	(United States) Mike D'Antoni	—
2002–03	Benetton Treviso ‡	3–1	Skipper Bologna	(Italy) Ettore Messina	—
2003–04	Montepaschi Siena	3–0	Skipper Bologna	(Italy) Carlo Recalcati	(Australia) David Andersen
2004–05	Climamio Bologna	3–1	Armani Jeans Milano	(Croatia) Jasmin Repeša	(Italy) Gianluca Basile
2005–06	Benetton Treviso	3–1	Climamio Bologna	(United States) David Blatt	(Lithuania) Ramūnas Šiškauskas
2006–07	Montepaschi Siena	3–0	VidiVici Bologna	(Italy) Simone Pianigiani	(Lithuania) Rimantas Kaukėnas
2007–08	Montepaschi Siena	4–1	Lottomatica Roma	(Italy) Simone Pianigiani	(United States) Terrell McIntyre
2008–09	Montepaschi Siena ‡	4–0	Armani Jeans Milano	(Italy) Simone Pianigiani	(United States) Terrell McIntyre
2009–10	Montepaschi Siena ‡	4–0	Armani Jeans Milano	(Italy) Simone Pianigiani	(United States) Terrell McIntyre
2010–11	Montepaschi Siena ‡	4–1	Bennet Cantù	(Italy) Simone Pianigiani	(North Macedonia) Bo McCalebb
2011–12	~~Montepaschi Siena~~ (Note: Following an investigation for accounting and fiscal fraud, the Italian Basketball Federation revoked all the domestic titles won by the club during the 2011–12 and 2012–13 seasons.)	4–1	EA7 Emporio Armani Milano	(Italy) Simone Pianigiani	(North Macedonia) Bo McCalebb
2012–13	~~Montepaschi Siena †~~	4–1	Acea Roma	(Italy) Luca Banchi	(Italy) Daniel Hackett
2013–14	EA7 Emporio Armani Milano	4–3	Montepaschi Siena	(Italy) Luca Banchi	(Italy) Alessandro Gentile
2014–15	Banco di Sardegna Sassari ‡	4–3	Grissin Bon Reggio Emilia	(Italy) Romeo Sacchetti	(United States) Rakim Sanders
2015–16	EA7 Emporio Armani Milano †	4–2	Grissin Bon Reggio Emilia	(Croatia) Jasmin Repeša	(United States) Rakim Sanders
2016–17	Umana Reyer Venezia	4–2	Dolomiti Energia Trento	(Italy) Walter De Raffaele	(Canada) Melvin Ejim
2017–18	EA7 Emporio Armani Milano	4–2	Dolomiti Energia Trento	(Italy) Simone Pianigiani	(United States) Andrew Goudelock
2018–19	Umana Reyer Venezia	4–3	Banco di Sardegna Sassari	(Italy) Walter De Raffaele	(United States) Austin Daye
2019–20	Season cancelled due to COVID-19 pandemic				
2020–21	Virtus Segafredo Bologna	4–0	AX Armani Exchange Milano	(Serbia) Aleksandar Đorđević	(Serbia) Miloš Teodosić
2021–22	AX Armani Exchange Milano†	4–2	Virtus Segafredo Bologna	(Italy) Ettore Messina	(Denmark) Shavon Shields
2022–23	AX Armani Exchange Milano	4–3	Virtus Segafredo Bologna	(Italy) Ettore Messina	(Italy) Luigi Datome
2023–24	AX Armani Exchange Milano	3–1	Virtus Segafredo Bologna	(Italy) Ettore Messina	(Spain) Nikola Mirotić
2024–25	Virtus Segafredo Bologna	3–0	Germani Brescia	(Montenegro) Dusko Ivanovic	(Georgia (country)) Tornike Shengelia

== Finals performances by clubs ==
Teams in italic are inactive or dissolved.

Club	Winners	Runners-up	Years won	Years runner-up
Olimpia Milano	10	10	1982, 1985, 1986, 1987, 1989, 1996, 2014, 2016, 2018, 2022	1979, 1983, 1984, 1988, 1991, 2005, 2009, 2010, 2012, 2021
Virtus Bologna	9	5	1979, 1980, 1984, 1993, 1994, 1995, 1998, 2001, 2021	1977, 1978, 1981, 2007, 2022
Mens Sana	6	1	2004, 2007, 2008, 2009, 2010, 2011, ~~2012~~, ~~2013~~	2014
Treviso	5	4	1992, 1997, 2002, 2003, 2006	1993, 1995, 1999, 2000
Varese	3	1	1977, 1978, 1999	1990
Fortitudo Bologna	2	8	2000, 2005	1996, 1997, 1998, 2001, 2002, 2003, 2004, 2006
Victoria Libertas	2	5	1988, 1990	1982, 1985, 1990, 1992, 1994
Reyer Venezia	2	2	2017, 2019	2015
Virtus Roma	1	2	1983	2008, 2013
Cantù	1	2	1981	1980, 2011
JuveCaserta	1	2	1991	1986, 1987
Dinamo Sassari	1	1	2015	2019
Trento	–	2	–	2017, 2018
Reggiana	–	2	–	2016, 2015
Libertas Liburnia	–	1	–	1989
