= LBA Most Valuable Player =

Basketball award in Italy

The Lega Basket Serie A (LBA) Most Valuable Player (MVP) is an annual award of the 1st-tier professional basketball league in Italy, the Lega Basket Serie A (LBA), given since the 1993–94 season, to the league's most valuable player in a given regular season.

== Winners ==
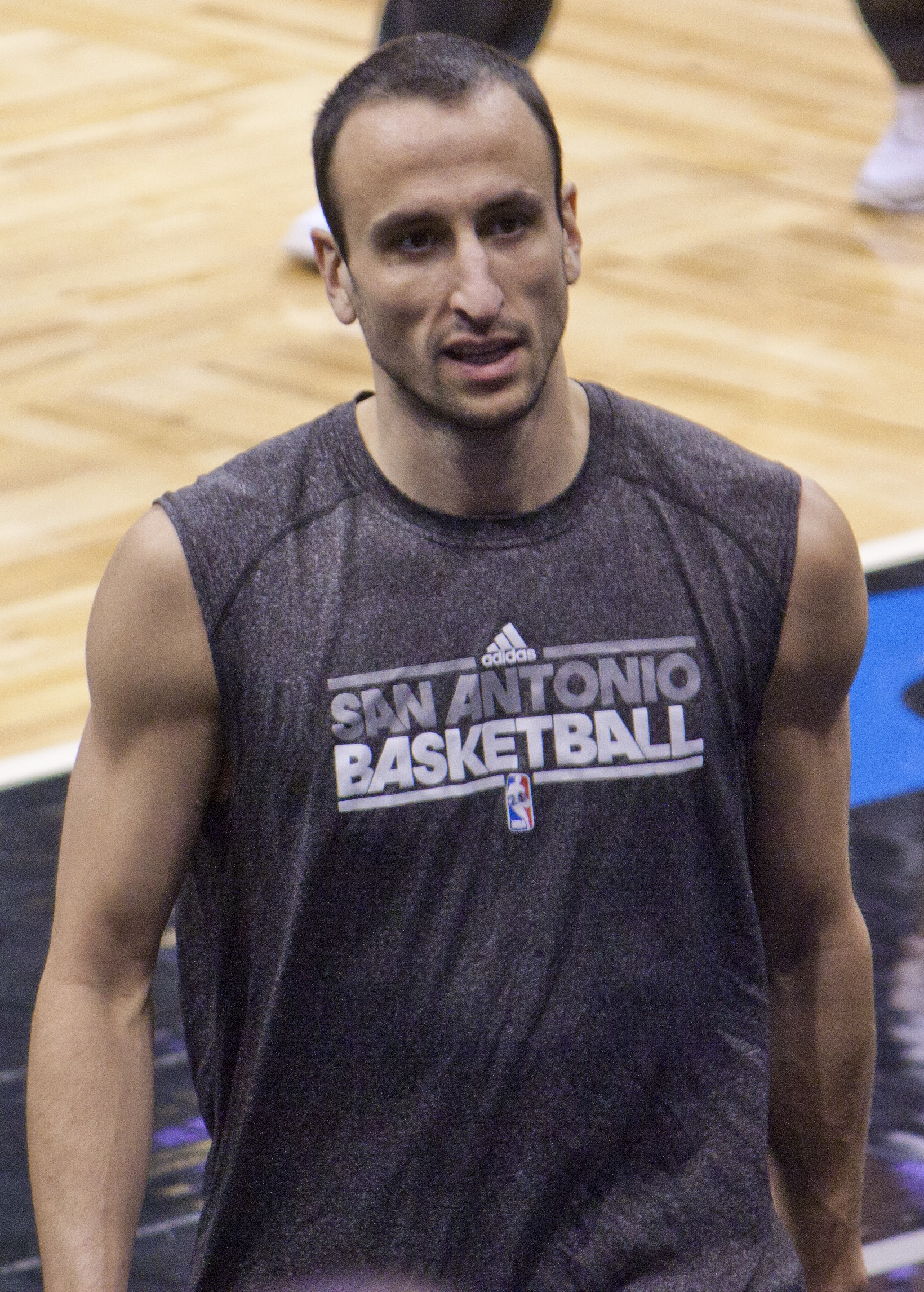
Manu Ginóbili won the MVP award two times, in 2001 and 2002.

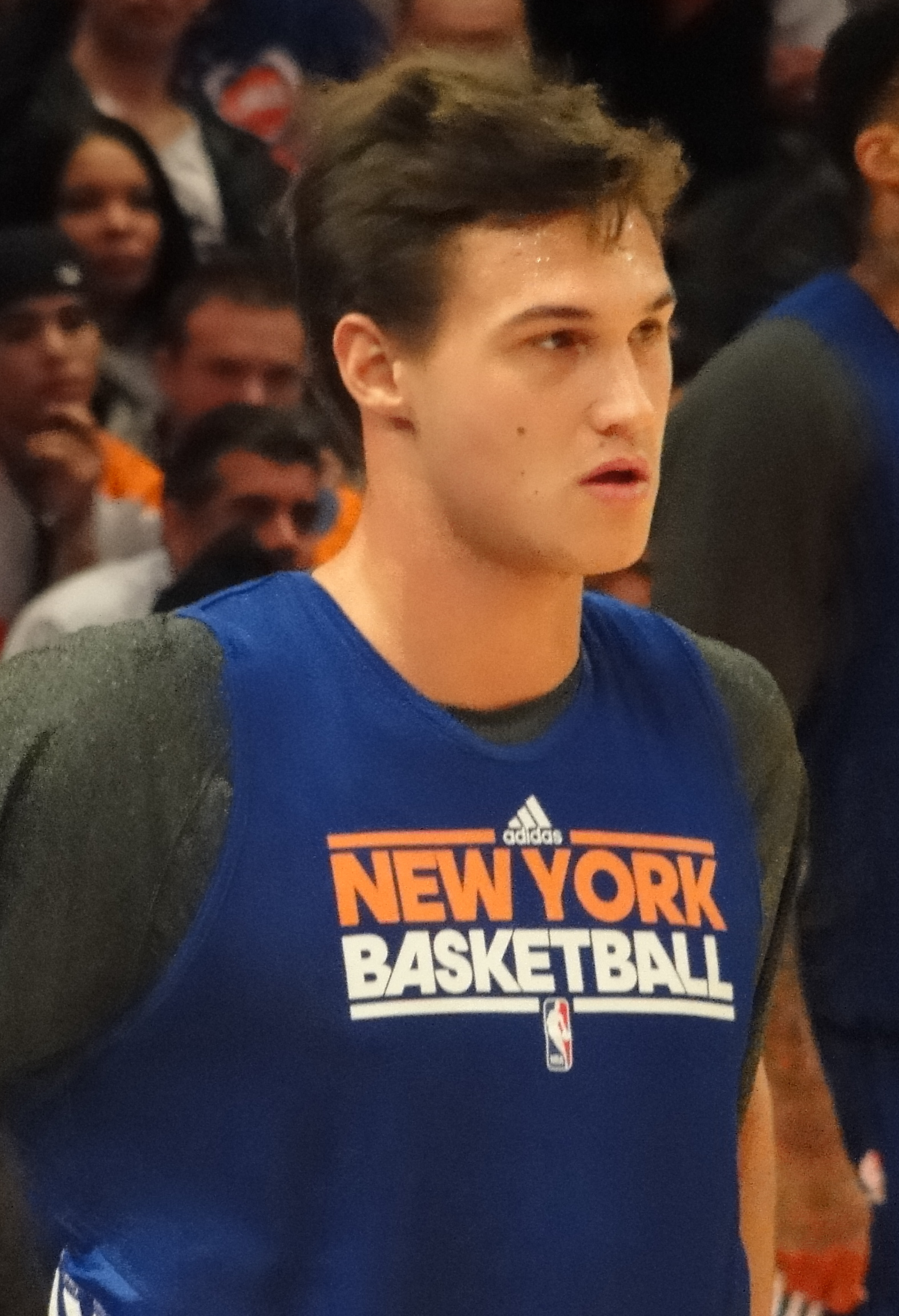
Danilo Gallinari was named the MVP in 2008.

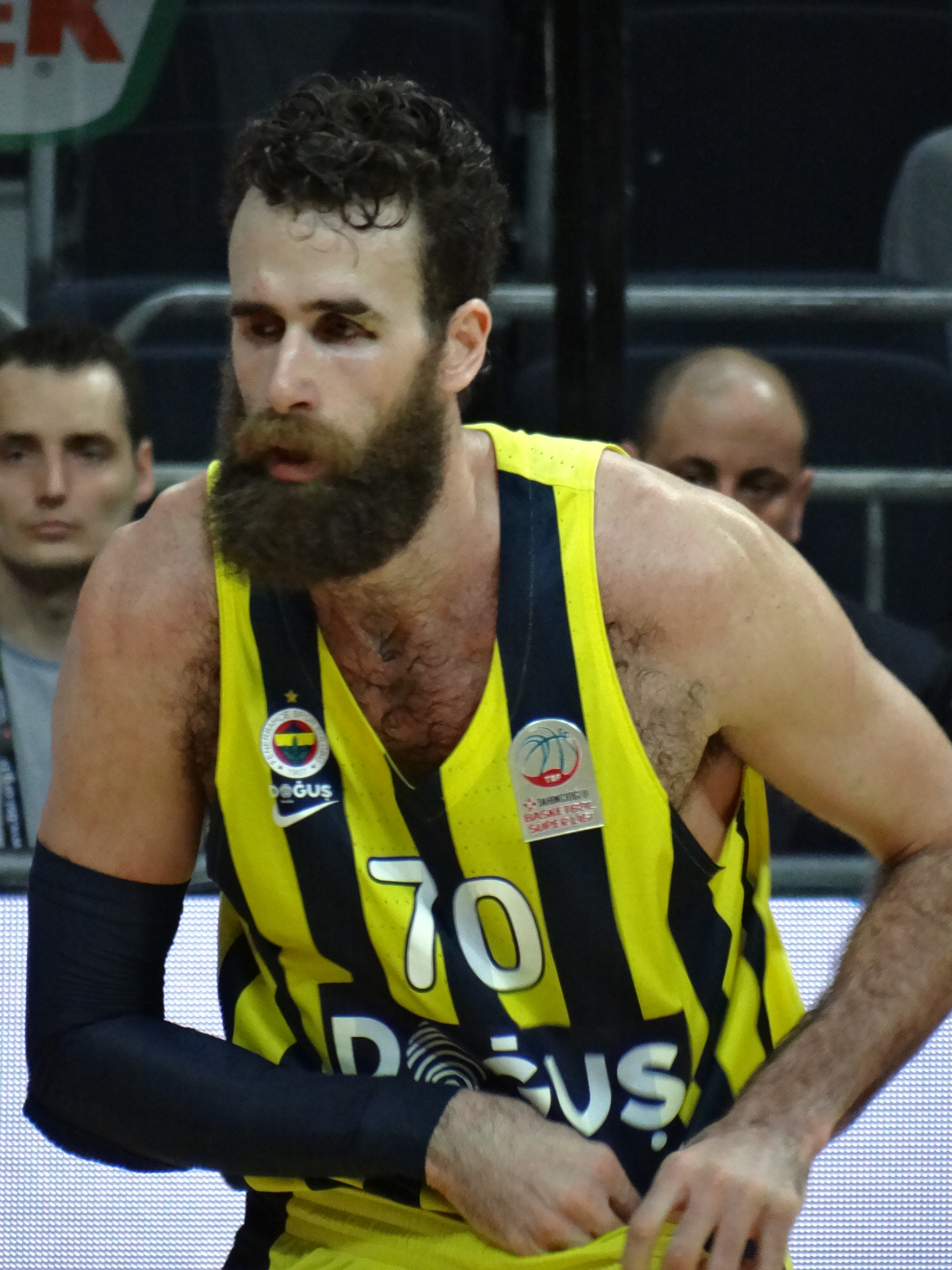
Luigi Datome won the award in 2013.

Key
Player (X)	Name of the player and number of times they had won the award at that point (if more than one)
†	Indicates multiple award winners in the same season

- Player nationalities by national team.

Season	Player	Pos.	Nationality	Team	Ref(s)
1993–94	Carlton Myers	SG	Italy (Note: Carlton Myers played for the Italian national team, and was raised in the United Kingdom.)	Scavolini Pesaro	
1994–95	Stefano Rusconi	C	Italy	Benetton Treviso	
1995–96	Henry Williams	SG	United States	Benetton Treviso	
1996–97	Carlton Myers (2×)	SG	Italy	Teamsystem Bologna	
1997–98	Sasha Danilović	SG/SF	FR Yugoslavia	Kinder Bologna	
1998–99	Vincenzo Esposito	SG	Italy	Termal Imola	
1999–00	Vincenzo Esposito (2×)	SG	Italy	Lineltex Imola	
2000–01	Manu Ginóbili	SG	Argentina	Kinder Bologna	
2001–02	Manu Ginóbili (2×)	SG	Argentina	Kinder Bologna	
2002–03	Massimo Bulleri	PG/SG	Italy	Benetton Treviso	
2003–04	Gianluca Basile	SG	Italy	Skipper Bologna	
2004–05	Massimo Bulleri (2×)	PG/SG	Italy	Benetton Treviso	
2005–06	Lynn Greer	PG/SG	United States	Carpisa Napoli	
2006–07	Terrell McIntyre	PG	United States	Montepaschi Siena	
2007–08	Danilo Gallinari	SF/PF	Italy	Armani Jeans Milano	
2008–09	Terrell McIntyre (2×)	PG	United States	Montepaschi Siena	
2009–10	Romain Sato	SG/SF	Central African Republic	Montepaschi Siena	
2010–11	Omar Thomas	SG/SF	United States	Air Avellino	
2011–12	Bo McCalebb	PG	North Macedonia (Note: Bo McCalebb played for the Macedonian national team, and was born in the USA.)	Montepaschi Siena	
2012–13	Luigi Datome	SF/PF	Italy	Acea Roma	
2013–14	Drake Diener	SG	United States	Banco di Sardegna Sassari	
2014–15	Tony Mitchell	SF	United States	Dolomiti Energia Trento	
2015–16	James Nunnally	SF	United States	Sidigas Avellino	
2016–17	Marcus Landry	SF	United States	Brescia Leonessa	
2017–18	Jason Rich	G	United States	Sidigas Avellino	
2018–19	Drew Crawford	SF	United States	Vanoli Cremona	
2019–20	Not awarded due to the COVID-19 pandemic				
2020–21	Stefano Tonut	G	Italy	Reyer Venezia	
2021–22	Amedeo Della Valle	G	Italy	Basket Brescia Leonessa	
2022–23	Colbey Ross	PG	United States	Openjobmetis Varese	
2023–24	Marco Belinelli	SG	Italy	Virtus Bologna	
2024–25	Miro Bilan	C	Croatia	Pallacanestro Brescia	
2025–26	Armoni Brooks	SG	United States	Olimpia Milano	

== Players with most awards ==
Player	Editions	Notes
(Argentina) Manu Ginóbili	2	2001, 2002
(United States) Terrell McIntyre	2	2007, 2009
(Italy) Massimo Bulleri	2	2003, 2005
(Italy) Carlton Myers	2	1994, 1997
(Italy) Vincenzo Esposito	2	1999, 2000

== See also ==
- Lega Basket Serie A Finals MVP
- Lega Basket Serie A awards
