= 2004–05 Lega Basket Serie A =

Lega Basket Serie A
- Season: 2004–05
- Duration: October 3, 2004 – June 5, 2005
- Games played: 34
- Teams: 18

Regular season
- Top seed: Benetton Treviso
- Season MVP: (Italy) Massimo Bulleri
- Relegated: Sicc Cucine Jesi; Scavolini Pesaro

Finals
- Champions: Climamio Bologna; 2nd title
- Runners-up: Armani Jeans Milano
- Semifinalists: Benetton Treviso; Lottomatica Roma
- Finals MVP: (Italy) Gianluca Basile

Statistical leaders
Points	(United States) Drew Nicholas	22.8
Rebounds	(United States) Casey Shaw	9.4
Assists	(United States) Tyson Wheeler	4.7

The 2004–05 Lega Basket Serie A season, known as the Serie A TIM for sponsorship reasons, was the 83rd season of the Lega Basket Serie A, the highest professional basketball league in Italy.

The regular season ran from October 3, 2004 to May 2005, 18 teams played 34 games each. The top 8 teams made the play-offs whilst the lowest ranked team, Sicc Cucine Jesi and the bankrupt club Scavolini Pesaro, were relegated to the Legadue.

Climamio Bologna won their second title by winning the playoff finals series against Armani Jeans Milano.

== Regular season 2004/05 ==
Rank	Team	GP	W	L	PF	PA	Coach
1	Benetton Treviso	34	28	6	2,836	2,457	(Italy) Ettore Messina
2	Climamio Bologna	34	25	9	2,897	2,619	(Croatia) Jasmin Repeša
3	Montepaschi Siena	34	25	9	2,875	2,593	(Italy) Carlo Recalcati
4	Armani Jeans Milano	34	24	10	2,680	2,486	(Italy) Lino Lardo
5	Vertical Vision Cantù	34	22	12	2,911	2,745	(Italy) Stefano Sacripanti
6	Lottomatica Roma	34	18	16	2,761	2,728	(Italy) Piero Bucchi (first 17 games, 9-8) (Italy) Guido Saibene (next 1 game, 0-1) (Serbia) Svetislav Pešić (last 16 games, 9-7)
7	Sedima Roseto	34	16	18	2,692	2,844	(Croatia) Neven Spahija
8	Pompea Napoli	34	16	18	2,885	2,943	(Italy) Andrea Mazzon (first 7 games, 3-4) (Italy) Maurizio Bartocci (next 1 game, 0-1) (Italy) Attilio Caja (next 11 games, 5-6) (Italy) Maurizio Bartocci (last 15 games, 8-7)
9	Scavolini Pesaro	34	15	19	2,709	2,753	(United States) Phil Melillo (first 13 games, 7-6) (Italy) Marco Crespi (last 21 games, 8-13)
10	Navigo.it Teramo	34	15	19	2,709	2,753	(Italy) Cesare Pancotto
11	Villaggio Solidago Livorno	34	14	20	2,815	2,893	(Italy) Walter De Raffaele
12	Air Avellino	34	14	20	2,737	2,995	(North Macedonia) Zare Markovski
13	Bipop Carire Reggio Emilia	34	13	21	2,657	2,576	(Italy) Fabrizio Frates
14	Casti Group Varese	34	13	21	2,736	2,891	(Italy) Giulio Cadeo (first 8 games, 3-5) (Italy) Gianni Molina (next 1 game, 0-1) (Argentina) Ruben Magnano (last 25 games, 10-15)
15	Snaidero Cucine Udine	34	13	21	2,675	2,834	(Slovenia) Teoman Alibegović
16	Lauretana Biella	34	12	22	2,747	2,831	(Italy) Alessandro Ramagli
17	Eurofiditalia Reggio Calabria	34	12	22	2,720	2,950	(Italy) Alessandro Giuliani (first 27 games, 7-20) (Italy) Antonio Zorzi (last 7 games, 5-2)
18	Sicc Cucine Jesi	34	11	23	2,751	2,899	(Italy) Luigi Gresta (first 18 games, 5-13) (Montenegro) Slobodan Subotić (last 16 games, 6-10)

Teams marked in green qualified for the playoffs. Teams marked in red were relegated to Serie A2. Scavolini Pesaro has gone bankrupt after the season and moved to Serie B, sparing Reggio Calabria relegation.

== Playoffs ==
Quarterfinals

- Benetton Treviso - Pompea Napoli 3-0 (94-75, 86-75, 86-73)
- Climamio Bologna - Sedima Roseto 3-0 (95-84, 77-72, 73-70)
- Lottomatica Roma - Montepaschi Siena 3-1 (88-86, 82-78, 79-85, 87-78)
- Armani Jeans Milano - Vertical Vision Cantù 3-0 (83-77, 92-83, 94-83)

Semifinals

- Armani Jeans Milano - Benetton Treviso 3-2 (60-82, 58-49, 61-80, 69-58, 61-57)
- Climamio Bologna - Lottomatica Roma 3-1 (78-64, 65-76, 80-61, 63-62)

Finals

- Climamio Bologna - Armani Jeans Milano 3-1 (77-70, 66-73, 80-71, 67-65)

== Individual leaders ==
Statistics are for the regular season.

=== Scoring ===
Rank	Name	Nation	Team	PPG
1.	Drew Nicholas	(United States)	Villaggio Solidago Livorno	22.8
2.	Jamel Thomas	(United States)	Navigo.it Teramo	20.2
3.	Charles Smith	(United States)	Scavolini Pesaro	19.6
4.	Mike Penberthy	(United States)	Pompea Napoli	19.2
5.	Norman Nolan	(United States)	Casti Group Varese	18.9
6.	Mahmoud Abdul-Rauf	(United States)	Sedima Roseto	18.7
7.	Preston Shumpert	(United States)	Villaggio Solidago Livorno	18.1
8.	Duane Woodward	(United States)	Sedima Roseto	17.2
9.	Raymond Tutt	(United States)	Sicc Cucine Jesi	16.7
10.	Mario Austin	(United States)	Lauretana Biella	16.7

=== Assists ===
Rank	Name	Nation	Team	APG
1.	Tyson Wheeler	(United States)	Navigo.it Teramo	4.7
2.	Misan Nikagbatse	(Germany)	Sedima Roseto	4.0
3.	Cookie Belcher	(United States)	Lauretana Biella	3.8
4.	Sani Bečirovič	(Slovenia)	Casti Group Varese	3.8
5.	Duane Woodward	(United States)	Sedima Roseto	3.6
6.	Gianmarco Pozzecco	(Italy)	Climamio Bologna	3.5
7.	Kiwane Garris	(United States)	Bipop Carire Reggio Emilia	3.4
8.	Nate Green	(United States)	Air Avellino	3.4
9.	Jerry McCullough	(United States)	Armani Jeans Milano	3.2
10.	Tyus Edney	(United States)	Lottomatica Roma	2.9

=== Rebounds ===
Rank	Name	Nation	Team	RPG
1.	Casey Shaw	(United States) (Italy)	Eurofiditalia Reggio Calabria	9.4
2.	Brooks Sales	(United States)	Navigo.it Teramo	9.0
3.	Chris Massie	(United States)	Air Avellino	8.6
4.	James Singleton	(United States)	Armani Jeans Milano	8.4
5.	Jacob Jaacks	(United States)	Lauretana Biella	8.2
6.	Damon Williams	(United States)	Air Avellino	8.2
7.	Aloysius Anagonye	(United States)	Villaggio Solidago Livorno	8.1
8.	Joseph Blair	(United States)	Armani Jeans Milano	8.0
9.	Denis Marconato	(Italy)	Benetton Treviso	7.5
10.	Mason Rocca	(United States) (Italy)	Pompea Napoli	7.4

== See also ==
- LBA
