= 2005–06 Lega Basket Serie A =

Lega Basket Serie A
- Season: 2005–06
- Duration: October 9, 2005 – June 20, 2006
- Games played: 34
- Teams: 18

Regular season
- Top seed: Climamio Bologna
- Season MVP: (United States) Lynn Greer
- Relegated: BT Roseto; Viola Reggio Calabria

Finals
- Champions: Benetton Treviso; 5th title
- Runners-up: Climamio Bologna
- Semifinalists: Carpisa Napoli; Lottomatica Roma
- Finals MVP: (Lithuania) Ramūnas Šiškauskas

Statistical leaders
Points	(United States) Lynn Greer	23.5
Rebounds	(Dominican Republic) Jack Michael Martínez	12.5
Assists	(Italy) Antonio Porta	4.3

The 2005–06 Lega Basket Serie A season, known as the Serie A TIM for sponsorship reasons, was the 84th season of the Lega Basket Serie A, the highest professional basketball league in Italy.

The regular season ran from October 9, 2005 to May 2006, 18 teams played 34 games each. The top 8 teams made the play-offs whilst the lowest ranked team, Viola Reggio Calabria and the bankrupt club BT Roseto, were relegated to the Legadue.

Benetton Treviso won their second title by winning the playoff finals series against Climamio Bologna.

== Regular season 2005/06 ==
Rank	Team	GP	W	L	PF	PA	Coach
1	Climamio Bologna	34	27	7	2,929	2,650	(Croatia) Jasmin Repeša
2	Benetton Treviso	34	26	8	2,862	2,616	(United States) David Blatt
3	Montepaschi Siena	34	23	11	2,763	2,495	(Italy) Carlo Recalcati
4	Carpisa Napoli	34	23	11	3,051	2,848	(Italy) Piero Bucchi
5	Snaidero Udine	34	22	12	2,819	2,793	(Italy) Cesare Pancotto
6	Lottomatica Roma	34	22	12	2,740	2,667	(Serbia) Svetislav Pešić
7	Armani Jeans Milano	34	22	12	2,826	2,662	(Italy) Lino Lardo (first 17 games, 10-7) (Italy) Mario Fioretti (next 1 game, 0-1) (Serbia) Aleksandar Đorđević (last 16 games, 12-4)
8	Angelico Biella	34	19	15	2,730	2,645	(Italy) Alessandro Ramagli
9	VidiVici Bologna	34	19	15	2,730	2,645	(North Macedonia) Zare Markovski
10	Whirlpool Varese	34	17	17	2,620	2,643	(Argentina) Ruben Magnano
11	Bipop Carire Reggio Emilia	34	16	18	2,796	2,803	(Italy) Fabrizio Frates
12	Basket Livorno	34	13	21	2,764	2,768	(Italy) Paolo Moretti
13	Navigo.it Teramo	34	12	22	2,786	2,944	(Italy) Matteo Boniciolli
14	Vertical Vision Cantù	34	12	22	2,699	2,799	(Italy) Stefano Sacripanti
15	BT Roseto	34	10	24	2,464	2,693	(Italy) Alberto Martelossi (first 10 games, 2-8) (Italy) Attilio Caja (last 24 games, 8-16)
16	Upea Capo d'Orlando	34	10	24	2,779	2,913	(Italy) Giovanni Perdichizzi
17	Air Avellino	34	10	24	2,589	2,828	(Italy) Alessandro Giuliani (first 7 games, 0-7) (Italy) Andrea Capobianco (last 27 games, 10-17)
18	Viola Reggio Calabria	34	3	31	2,549	3,055	(Italy) Walter De Raffaele (first 12 games, 3-9) (Italy) Pasquale Iracà (next 2 games, 0-2) (Italy) Antonio Zorzi (next 9 games, 0-9) (Italy) Pasquale Iracà (last 11 games, 0-11)

Teams marked in green qualified for the playoffs. Teams marked in red were relegated to Serie A2. BT Roseto team went bankrupt after the season, therefore Air Avellino was spared relegation.

== Playoffs ==
Quarterfinals

- Climamio Bologna - Angelico Biella 3-1 (78-67, 76-85, 105-55, 80-76)
- Benetton Treviso - Armani Jeans Milano 3-2 (83-76, 65-76, 77-70, 67-75, 81-66)
- Lottomatica Roma - Montepaschi Siena 3-1 (64-74, 84-60, 78-72, 84-63)
- Carpisa Napoli - Snaidero Udine 3-0 (107-87, 92-84, 91-72)

Semifinals

- Climamio Bologna - Carpisa Napoli 3-2 (91-89, 78-89, 83-58, 82-92, 103-83)
- Benetton Treviso - Lottomatica Roma 3-1 (85-77, 67-70, 63-55, 81-73)

Finals

- Benetton Treviso - Climamio Bologna 3-1 (77-69, 88-82, 72-73, 69-68)

== Individual leaders ==
Statistics are for the regular season.

=== Scoring ===
Rank	Name	Nation	Team	PPG
1.	Lynn Greer	(United States)	Carpisa Napoli	23.5
2.	David Bluthenthal	(United States)	VidiVici Bologna	20.2
3.	Joe Crispin	(United States)	Navigo.it Teramo	19.1
4.	Damon Williams	(United States)	Angelico Biella	18.9
5.	Delonte Holland	(United States)	Navigo.it Teramo	18.6
6.	Rimantas Kaukenas	(Lithuania)	Montepaschi Siena	18.3
7.	Keith Carter	(United States)	Upea Capo d'Orlando	18.2
8.	David Young	(United States)	Air Avellino	18.1
9.	David Hawkins	(United States)	Lottomatica Roma	17.3
10.	Terrell McIntyre	(United States)	Bipop Carire Reggio Emilia	16.9

=== Assists ===
Rank	Name	Nation	Team	APG
1.	Antonio Porta	(Italy)	Basket Livorno	4.3
2.	Terrell McIntyre	(United States)	Bipop Carire Reggio Emilia	4.3
3.	Leonardo Busca	(Italy)	BT Roseto	4.1
4.	Davide Bonora	(Italy)	Air Avellino	3.8
5.	Lynn Greer	(United States)	Carpisa Napoli	3.5
6.	Nikolaos Zisis	(Greece)	Benetton Treviso	3.5
7.	Marque Perry	(United States)	Upea Capo d'Orlando	3.0
8.	Drew Nicholas	(United States)	Benetton Treviso	3.0
9.	DeJuan Collins	(United States)	Whirlpool Varese	2.9
10.	Aleksandar Ćapin	(Slovenia)	Viola Reggio Calabria	2.9

=== Rebounds ===
Rank	Name	Nation	Team	RPG
1.	Jack Michael Martínez	(Dominican Republic)	BT Roseto	12.5
2.	Kebu Stewart	(United States)	Vertical Vision Cantù	11.8
3.	Pervis Pasco	(United States)	Navigo.it Teramo	10.0
4.	Marcus Goree	(United States)	Benetton Treviso	8.8
5.	Brandon Brown	(United States)	Air Avellino	8.4
6.	Joseph Blair	(United States)	Armani Jeans Milano	8.3
7.	Jacob Jaacks	(United States)	Snaidero Udine	7.9
8.	Marko Milič	(Slovenia)	VidiVici Bologna	7.7
9.	Jason Capel	(United States)	BT Roseto	7.6
10.	Travis Watson	(United States)	Climamio Bologna	7.6

== See also ==
- LBA
