= Francesco Vitucci =

Italian basketball coach

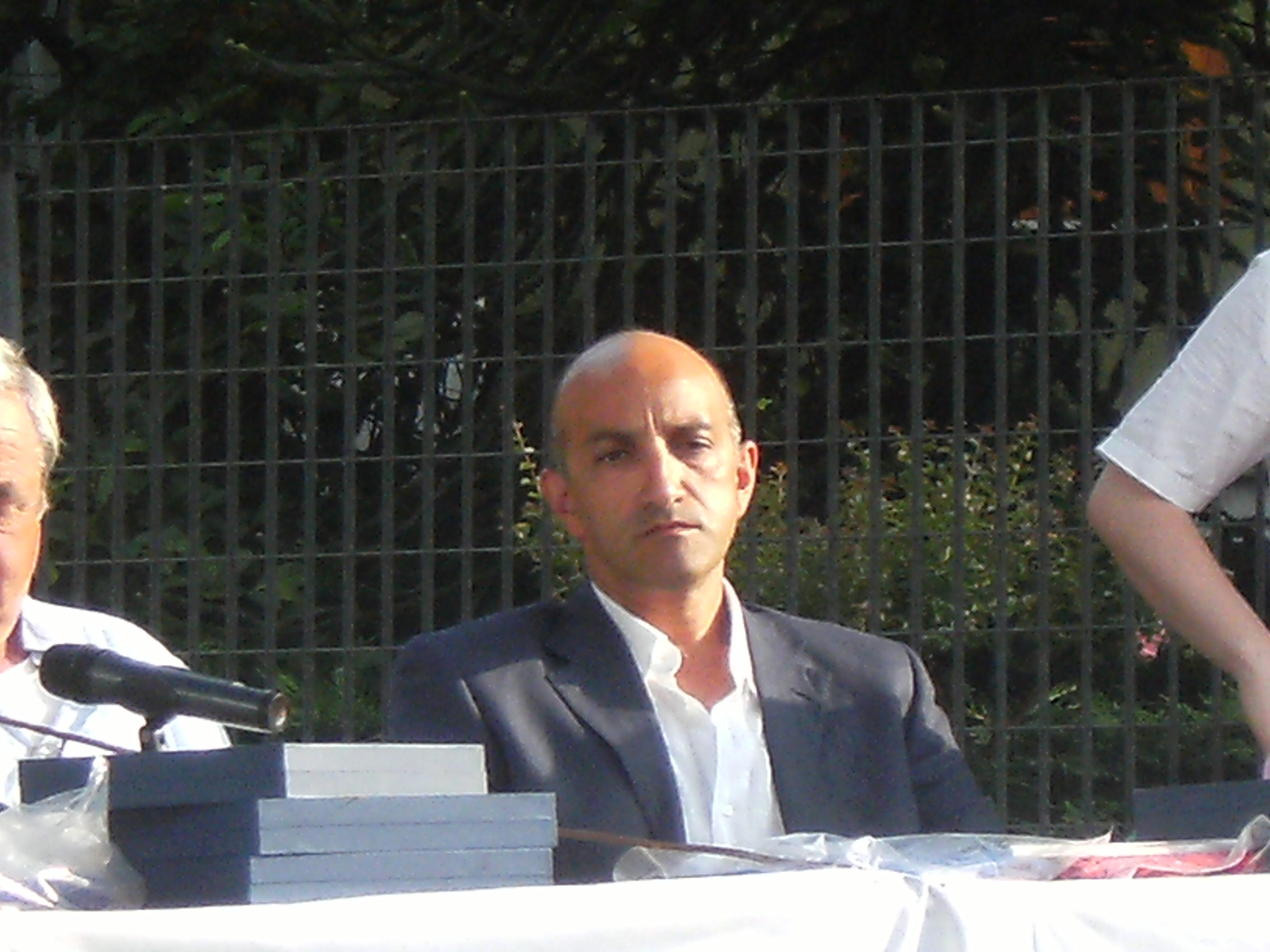
- Vitucci in Varese, in 2012

Pallacanestro Cantù
- Position: Head coach
- League: LBA

Personal information
- Born: 5 April 1963 (age 63) Venice, Italy
- Coaching career: 1986–present

Career history

Coaching
- 1986–1994: Reyer Venezia (assistant)
- 1994–1996: Reyer Venezia
- 1996–2001: Andrea Costa Imola
- 2001–2007: Pallacanestro Treviso (assistant)
- 2007: Pallacanestro Treviso
- 2007–2009: Pallacanestro Treviso (assistant)
- 2010–2012: Scandone Avellino
- 2012–2013: Pallacanestro Varese
- 2013–2015: Scandone Avellino
- 2015–2017: Auxulium Torino
- 2017–2023: New Basket Brindisi
- 2023–2025: Universo Treviso
- 2026–present: Pallacanestro Cantù

Career highlights
- Italian League Best Coach (2013, 2021); Italian Supercup winner (2006)

Francesco "Frank" Vitucci (born 5 April 1963) is an Italian professional basketball coach, who currently serves as the head coach for Pallacanestro Cantù in the Italian Lega Basket Serie A (LBA).

== Coaching career ==
Vitucci began his career as a basketball coach with the Reyer Venezia's youth team, and at the same time he was the assistant coach for seven years on the senior team of Venice. He later became the head coach of the team and achieved the promotion to Serie A in 1996.

After the bankruptcy of the club he went to Andrea Costa Imola. He took part of the Korać Cup and the Saporta Cup.

In 2003 he became assistant coach of Benetton Treviso, and stayed for seven years.

In 2010 Scandone Avellino offered him the bench as head coach for the next two seasons in Serie A in place of Cesare Pancotto.

On 7 June 2012 Vitucci became the head coach of Pallacanestro Varese signing a contract for two seasons. Varese won the 2012–13 regular season with 46 points (23 victories and 7 defeats), but in the playoffs they were eliminated by Montepaschi Siena (4–3 in the series) at the semifinals.

In July he left Pallacanestro Varese and returned to Scandone Avellino for two more seasons.

In December 2015 he became the head coach of Auxilium Torino.

On 14 December 2017 Vitucci became head coach of New Basket Brindisi.

On June 2, 2023, he signed with Universo Treviso of the Lega Basket Serie A (LBA).
