= Maurizio Gherardini =

Italian basketball player and executive

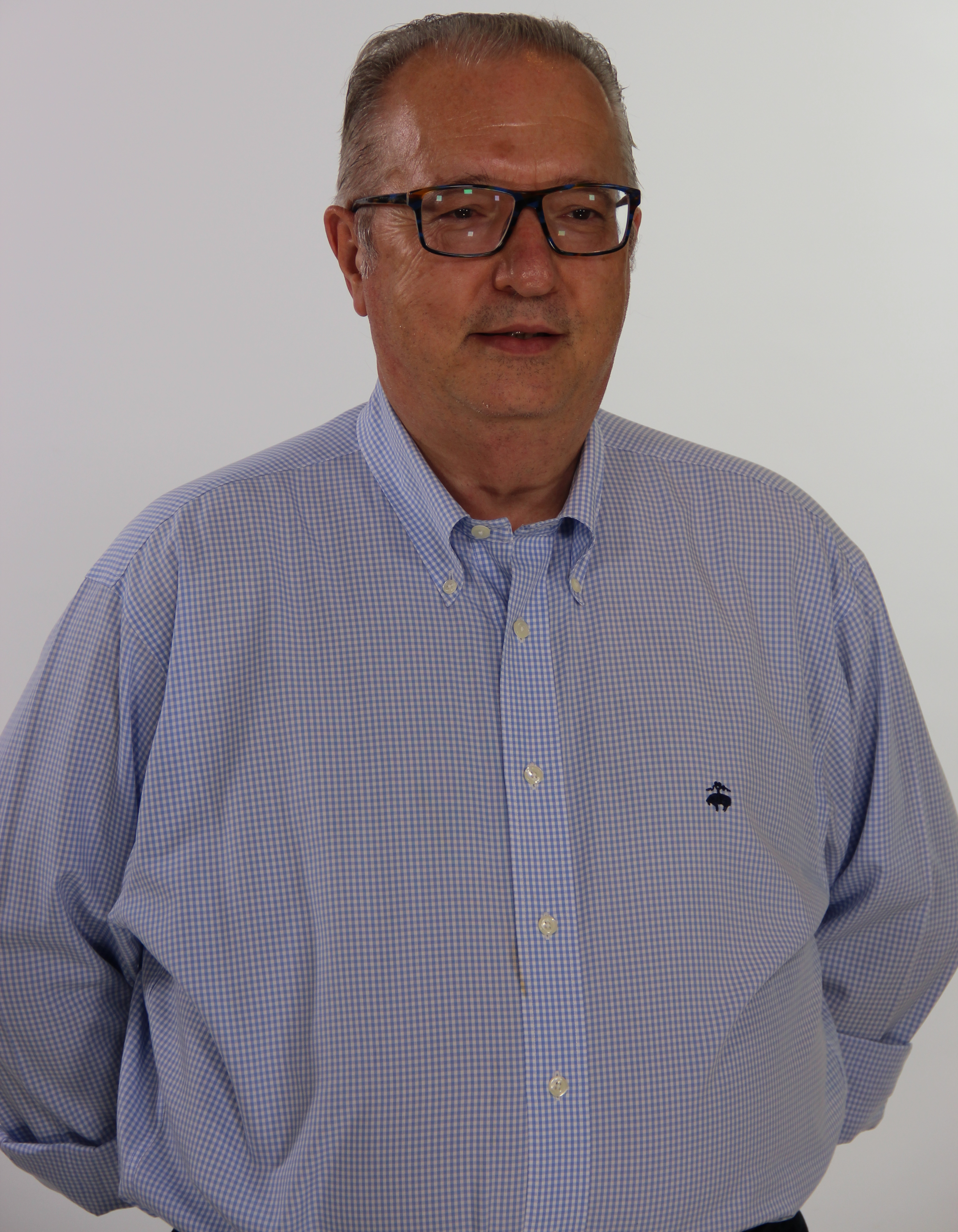

President of the Lega Basket Serie A
- Incumbent
- Assumed office 25 June 2025
- Preceded by: Umberto Gandini

Personal details
- Born: September 22, 1955 (age 71) Forlì, Italy
- Occupation: Sports executive
- Basketball career

Career information
- Playing career: 1971–1980

Career history
- 1971–1980: Libertas Pallacanestro Forlì

Career highlights
- As executive: 2× EuroLeague champion (2017, 2025); EuroLeague Executive of the Year (2017); Saporta Cup champion (1999); 6× Turkish Super League champion (2016-2018, 2022, 2024, 2025); 6× Turkish Cup champion (2015 2016, 2019, 2020, 2024, 2025); 2× Turkish Presidential Cup champion (2016, 2017); 4× Italian League champion (1997, 2002, 2003, 2006); 7× Italian Cup champion (1993–1995, 2000, 2003–2005); 3× Italian Supercup (1997, 2002, 2006); Italian League's Best Executive (2006)

Maurizio 'Mo' Gherardini (born September 22, 1955) is an Italian sports executive who currently serves as the president of the Lega Basket Serie A.

In 2017, he was named the EuroLeague Executive of the Year in a year in which his club Fenerbahçe won the EuroLeague championship.

== Basketball career ==
Gherardini started his basketball career as a player playing on his hometown team of Libertas Pallacanestro Forlì from 1971 to 1975. From there he went on to become an assistant coach for Forlì and was also a director of youth teams for the club. He held those roles from 1975 to 1982, when he was then promoted to be the team's general manager in 1983. Forlì was playing in the top league (LBA) when Gherardini took over as GM.

After nine years at the helm of Forlì, Gherardini left the team in 1992 to take over as the general manager of Benetton Treviso, and molded that squad into one of the most familiar basketball clubs outside of the NBA. Benetton won four Italian League championships (1997, 2002, 2003, and 2006), three Italian Supercups (1997–98 season, 2001–02 season, and 2002–03 season), made four appearances in the EuroLeague Final Four (1993, 1998, 2002, and 2003), and helped them capture seven Italian Cups (1993–1995, 2000, 2003–2005). He was named the Italian League's Best Executive in 2006.

Gherardini also developed a sophisticated scouting system in the EuroLeague. NBA teams asked for his advice when it came to selecting players out of Europe.

Former NBA basketball player and general manager Kiki Vandeweghe said that Gherardini was one of the best general managers in the world and said that there is no doubt that Gherardini would make a great GM in the NBA.

== Executive career ==
=== Interviewed by Charlotte ===
In 2003, Gherardini was interviewed for the Charlotte Bobcats general manager position. It was the first time that a non-American citizen had been interviewed for a top job on an NBA team. Although he was seriously considered for the job, the Bobcats hired Bernie Bickerstaff instead.

=== Hired by Toronto ===
On June 22, 2006, Gherardini was hired by the Toronto Raptors as vice president and assistant general manager.

=== Oklahoma City ===
Following Bryan Colangelo's departure from Toronto, Gherardini was made free to pursue other options. He was hired on November 7, 2013, by the Oklahoma City Thunder as their senior advisor of international affairs.

=== Fenerbahçe and Turkey ===
Gherardini became new General manager of Turkish club Fenerbahçe, on May 21, 2014.

During his tenure, the club won the EuroLeague championship twice, in 2017 and 2025. His 11-year tenure at the club ended in 2025.

=== Lega Basket Serie A ===
On June 25, 2025, Gherardini was elected president of the Lega Basket Serie A.

=== Canada Basketball ===
Gherardini is also a member of Canada Basketball's Council Of Excellence.
