= 2002–03 Lega Basket Serie A =

Lega Basket Serie A
- Season: 2002–2003
- Duration: 22 September 2002 – 17 June 2003
- Games played: 34
- Teams: 18

Regular season
- Top seed: Benetton Treviso
- Season MVP: (Italy) Massimo Bulleri
- Relegated: Carifac Fabriano

Finals
- Champions: Benetton Treviso; 4th title
- Runners-up: Skipper Bologna
- Semi-finalists: Lottomatica Roma; Montepaschi Siena

Statistical leaders
Points	(Slovenia) Boris Gorenc	22.4
Rebounds	(Turkey) Mirsad Türkcan	10.7
Assists	(Italy) Gianmarco Pozzecco	4.8

The 2002–03 Lega Basket Serie A, known as the Foxy Cup for sponsorship reasons, was the 81st season of the Lega Basket Serie A, the highest professional basketball league in Italy.

The regular season ran from 22 September 2002 to 3 May 2003, the playoffs ran from 7 May 2003 to 17 June 2003.

Benetton Treviso won their 4th title after beating Skipper Bologna 3–1 in the finals series.

== Regular season ==
Pos	Teams	P	W	L	PF	PA	Qualification or relegation
1	Benetton Treviso	34	30	4	3093	2691	Playoffs
2	Lottomatica Roma	34	25	9	2670	2507	Playoffs
3	Oregon Scientific Cantù	34	25	9	2718	2601	Playoffs
4	Montepaschi Siena	34	22	12	2813	2603	Playoffs
5	Pippo Milano	34	20	14	2743	2645	Playoffs
6	Skipper Bologna	34	18	16	2796	2704	Playoffs
7	Pompea Napoli	34	18	16	2735	2737	Playoffs
8	Euro Roseto	34	17	17	2682	2657	Playoffs
9	Tris Reggio Calabria	34	17	17	2607	2559	Playoffs
10	Lauretana Biella	34	15	19	2746	2685	Playoffs
11	Acegas Trieste	34	15	19	2680	2820	Playoffs
12	Metis Varese	34	14	20	2695	2733	Playoffs
13	Scavolini Pesaro	34	14	20	2736	2892	
14	Virtus Bologna (Note: Relegated after the season for financial irregularities (see 2003–04 Lega Basket Serie A).)	34	13	21	2659	2749	
15	Air Avellino	34	13	21	2728	2854	
16	Mabo Livorno	34	13	21	2637	2791	
17	Snaidero Udine	34	13	21	2656	2698	
18	Carifac Fabriano	34	4	30	2460	2928	Relegation to Legadue

== Individual Statistics, Regular Season ==
=== Points ===
Rank	Name	Team	PPG
1.	(Slovenia) Boris Gorenc	Metis Varese	22.4
2.	(United States) J. J. Eubanks	Viola Reggio Calabria	19.6
3.	(United States) Jamel Thomas	Lauretana Biella	19.4
4.	(United States) Alphonso Ford	Montepaschi Siena	18.8
5.	(Italy) Carlton Myers	Lottomatica Roma	18.5

=== Assists ===
Rank	Name	Team	APG
1.	(Italy) Gianmarco Pozzecco	Skipper Bologna	4.8
2.	(United States) Tyus Edney	Benetton Treviso	4.2
3.	(United States) Jerry McCullough	Oregon Scientific Cantù	3.8
4.	(North Macedonia) Petar Naumoski	Pippo Milano	3.6
5.	(Italy) Riccardo Pittis	Benetton Treviso	3.4

=== Rebounds ===
Rank	Name	Team	RPG
1.	(Turkey) Mirsad Türkcan	Montepaschi Siena	10.7
2.	(Croatia) Ante Grgurević	Air Avellino	9.7
3.	(United States) Warren Kidd	Pippo Milano	9.2
4.	(Italy) Roberto Chiacig	Montepaschi Siena	8.5
5.	(United States) Joe Ira Clark	Carifac Fabriano	8.4

== Playoffs ==
Round of 16
Roseto	1
Reggio Calabria	2
Milano	1
Varese	2
Napoli	2
Biella	1
Bologna	2
Trieste	0

Quarter-finals
Treviso	3
Reggio Calabria	2
Siena	3
Varese	0
Roma	3
Pompea Napoli	1
Cantù	1
Bologna	3

Semi-finals
Treviso	3
Siena	1
Roma	2
Bologna	3

Final
Treviso	3
Bologna	1

1/8 Finals

- Metis Varese - Pippo Milano 2-1 (66-65, 79-55, 60-59)
- Skipper Bologna - Acegas Trieste 2-0 (89-67, 85-68)
- Pompea Napoli - Lauretana Biella 2-1 (84-60, 92-107, 95-92)
- Viola Reggio Calabria - Euro Roseto 2-1 (76-90, 86-82, 75-71)

Bye: Benetton Treviso, Lottomatica Roma, Oregon Scientific Cantù, Montepaschi Siena

Quarterfinals

- Benetton Treviso - Viola Reggio Calabria 3-2 (73-74, 58-65, 97-70, 71-69, 79-59)
- Lottomatica Roma - Pompea Napoli 3-1 (77-72, 84-70, 75-97, 105-92)
- Skipper Bologna - Oregon Scientific Cantù 3-1 (74-77, 95-93, 102-87, 86-77)
- Montepaschi Siena - Metis Varese 3-0 (73-65, 76-73, 72-60)

Semifinals

- Benetton Treviso - Montepaschi Siena 3-1 (91-89, 81-78, 74-86, 73-66)
- Skipper Bologna - Lottomatica Roma 3-2 (62-71, 83-80, 89-96, 88-81, 77-75)

Finals

- Benetton Treviso - Skipper Bologna 3-1 (90-86, 67-73, 87-62, 84-80)

== Awards ==
- Most Valuable Player:

(Italy) Massimo Bulleri (Benetton Treviso)

- Coach of the year:

(Italy) Lino Lardo (Viola Reggio Calabria)
