= Paolo Moretti =

Italian basketball player and basketball coach

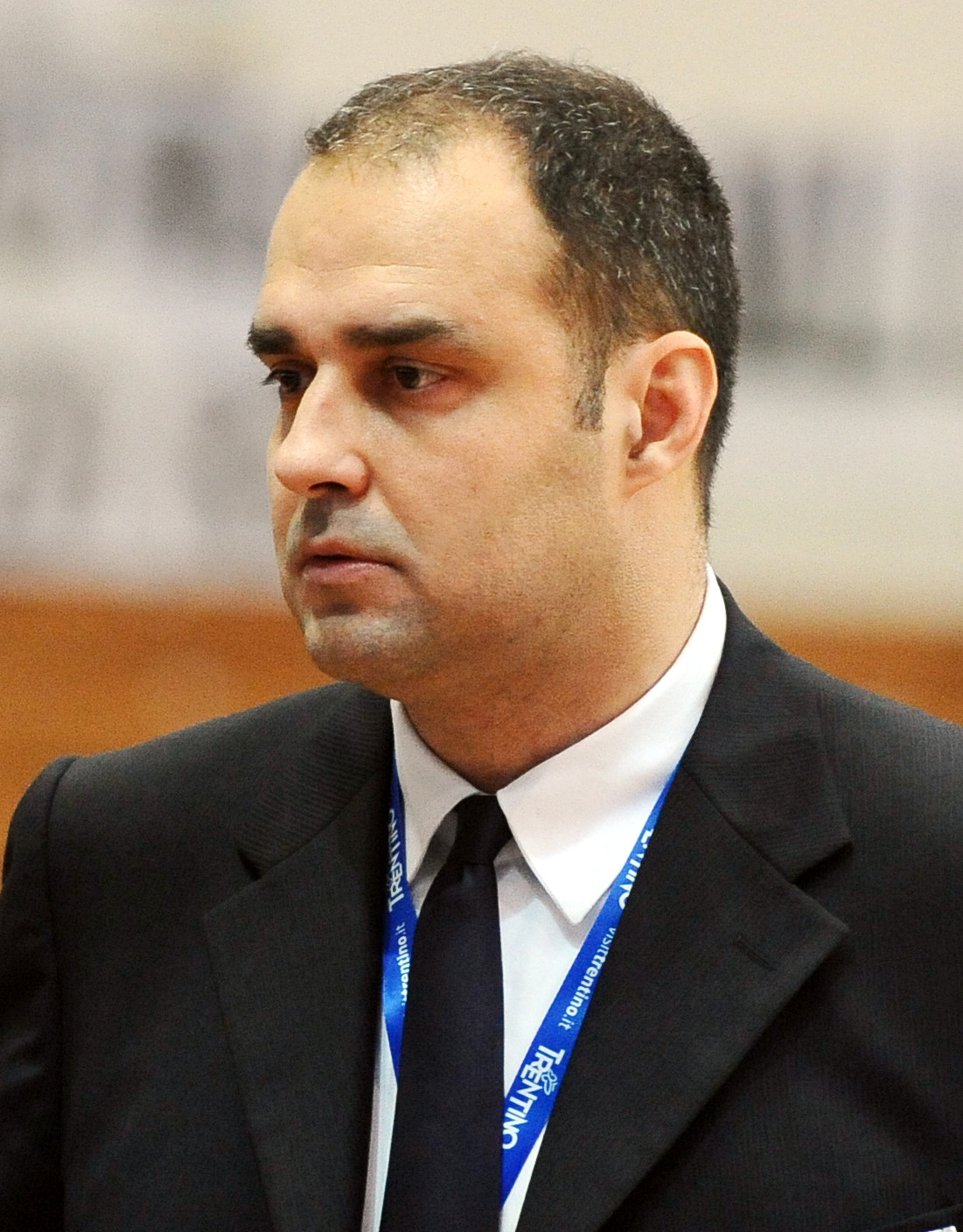
- Moretti as head coach of Pistoia Basket

Viola Supporters Trust
- Title: Head coach
- League: Serie C Silver

Personal information
- Born: 30 June 1970 (age 56) Arezzo, Italy
- Listed height: 6 ft 6.74 in (2.00 m)
- Listed weight: 205 lb (93 kg)

Career information
- Playing career: 1988–2000
- Position: Small forward
- Coaching career: 2001–present

Career history

Playing
- 1988–1992: Scaligera Verona
- 1992–1996: Virtus Bologna
- 1996–1997: Peristeri
- 1997–1998: Fortitudo Bologna
- 1998–1999: Mens Sana Siena
- 1999–2000: Roseto

Coaching
- 2001–2003: Virtus Siena (youth)
- 2003–2004: Pallacanestro Catanzaro
- 2004–2005: Stamura Ancona
- 2005–2006: Basket Livorno
- 2006–2007: Viola Reggio Calabria
- 2007–2008: Brindisi
- 2009–2015: Pistoia
- 2015–2017: Varese
- 2018-19: Mens Sana Siena
- 2019: Pistoia
- 2019-present: Viola Supporters Trust

Career highlights
- As player: Legadue Cup (1991); 3× Italian League champion (1993–1995); 2× Italian Cup champion (1991, 1998); 2× Italian Supercup champion (1996, 1998); As head coach: Italian League Coach of the Year (2014)
Medals
Representing Italy
Men's Basketball
Mediterranean Games
Gold medal – first place	1991 Greece	Italy
Gold medal – first place	1993 France	Italy
EuroBasket
Silver medal – second place	1997 Spain	Italy
FIBA Europe Under-20 Championship
Gold medal – first place	1992 Greece	Italy
European U-18 Championship
Silver medal – second place	1988 Yugoslavia	U-18 Team

Paolo Moretti (born 30 June 1970 in Arezzo) is a former professional basketball player, and current basketball coach from Italy, who won the silver medal with his national team at the Eurobasket 1997 in Spain. Standing at a height of 200 m (656 ft 2 in), he played as a Small forward. He is head coach of Viola Supporters Trust, a phoenix club of Viola Reggio Calabria competing in the fifth tier of the Italian basketball pyramid.

== Playing career ==
Paolo Moretti's first time as a senior player was in 1988 with Scaligera Verona, in the Serie A2 Basket. After years of success, his team won for the first time the Legadue Cup when he was just 21 years old, with 17 points and 4 rebounds per game. In the same year he made his debut in the National Team.

Thar was how he became a target for many big teams. He became a Virtus Bologna player for four seasons, from 1992 to 1996. With Virtus won three Scudettos consecutively (1993, 1994, 1995). He made his career high at the Bologna derby against Fortitudo Bologna with 26 points.

After a heel fracture Paolo was forced to stop for all the 1995–96.

Virtus Bologna decided to sell him to Peristeri B.C. for the 1996–1997 in the Greek Basket League.

At the end of the Greek experience, Paolo Moretti came back to Bologna, but at this time with Fortitudo Bologna for the 1997–1998 season. However the injury caused him some difficulties. He played less than before. His team arrived at the Finals, where they lost against Virtus Bologna, but he never went on the court. In 1998 he won the Italian Basketball Cup and in October of the same year Fortitudo Bologna won the second trophy of his history, the Supercup.

He left Bologna and went to Mens Sana Siena.

His last club where he played was Roseto Sharks of the Serie A2 Basket. Moretti left the team at the end of the 1999–2000 season, when he was named as the best player of the season.

== Coaching career ==
At the end of the player career, Paolo Moretti decided to begin the coach career. He began with Virtus Siena, a youth team of the city.

At the middle of the 2000–04 season arrived for the first opportunity for him to be a head coach of a senior team. He went to Pallacanestro Catanzaro, in B2, and later in B1 with Stamura Ancona.

His first time in Serie A was with Basket Livorno for the 2005-06 season.

At the end of the experience in Livorno he became the coach of Viola Reggio Calabria, a team in economic difficulties. In 2007 he went to New Basket Brindisi.

In 2009 Paolo Moretti was named as the new head coach of Pistoia Basket in Serie A2 Basket. In Pistoia obtain the qualification to the playoffs for the 2010–11 and 2011–12 seasons.

In 2012-13 Serie A2 season, after 18 victories of the 28 games played, Pistoia finished the regular season at the 3rd place. They were defeated by New Basket Brindisi in game-4 of the finals.

In 2012-13 Serie A2 season, Moretti and his team achieved the historical promotion to Serie A, beating Brescia Leonessa.

At the beginning of the first Serie A experience for Pistoia Basket, they looked in trouble, but in November were engaged Brad Wanamaker and JaJuan Johnson with whom defeated teams like Reyer Venezia, Virtus Roma and Virtus Bologna. At the end of the regular season they placed 8th. During the playoffs they were defeated by Olimpia Milano, but only after a fought series. Moretti won the award as Italian League Coach of the Year in 2014. So he was confirmed as coach of the team for the 2014-15 season. At the end of the season, Moretti left the beanch of Pistoia.

Since 24 June he is the new head coach of Pallacanestro Varese.

On 2 April 2019 Moretti returned to OriOra Pistoia and became head coach of the Italian club.
