= Gigena =

Gigena is a surname. Notable people with the surname include:

- Darío Alberto Gigena (born 1978), Argentine footballer
- Facundo Gigena (born 1994), Argentine rugby union player
- Mario Gigena (born 1977), Italian basketball player
- Rubén Darío Gigena (born 1980), Argentine footballer
