= Ian Lockhart =

Bahamian basketball player

Personal information
- Born: June 25, 1967 (age 58) Nassau, The Bahamas
- Listed height: 6 ft 8 in (2.03 m)
- Listed weight: 240 lb (109 kg)

Career information
- High school: Christian Academy (Nassau, The Bahamas)
- College: Tennessee (1986–1990)
- NBA draft: 1990: undrafted
- Position: Power forward
- Number: 51

Career history
- 1990: Phoenix Suns
- Stats at NBA.com
- Stats at Basketball Reference

Ian DeWitt Lockhart (born June 25, 1967) is a Bahamian former professional basketball player in the National Basketball Association (NBA). Listed at 6 ft 8 in (203 cm) and 240 lb (109 kg), he played as a center and power forward. Lockhart only appeared in one NBA game, and was the second NBA player from The Bahamas, the first being Mychal Thompson.

== College career ==
Lockhart played college basketball for the University of Tennessee Volunteers in the Southeastern Conference of the NCAA Division I from 1986 to 1990.

== Professional career ==
After going undrafted in the 1990 NBA draft he was signed by the Phoenix Suns in September 1990; however, he only played 2 minutes in a solitary November 1990 appearance, scoring 4 points. He remains the only player in NBA history to shoot 100% from both the field and the free throw line.

Released by the Suns, he moved to Puerto Rico to play in the Baloncesto Superior Nacional (BSN). He would play in the country for 15 seasons, including 11 consecutive seasons from 1990 to 2002, most notably for the Piratas de Quebradillas. In 2000, Lockhart won the BSN Most Valuable Player award.

Playing concurrently in Europe, Lockhart spent time in the French, Greek, Spanish, and Italian leagues.

In the Italian Lega Basket Serie A, he played for Virtus Roma, Mabo Pistoia—with whom he led the league in rebounding in 1997–98, Lineltex Imola, Roseto and Teramo Basket. He also played in Greece for Pagrati, Near East and Ampelokipoi Athens.
