= 2001–02 Lega Basket Serie A =

Lega Basket Serie A
- Season: 2001–02
- Duration: 23 September 2001 - 15 June 2002
- Teams: 19

Regular season
- Top seed: Skipper Bologna
- Season MVP: (Argentina) Manu Ginóbili
- Relegated: Fillattice Imola; Müller Verona

Finals
- Champions: Benetton Treviso; 3rd title
- Runners-up: Skipper Bologna
- Semifinalists: Kinder Bologna; Oregon Scientific Cantù

Statistical leaders
| Points | (United States) Louis Bullock | 24.9 |

The 2001–02 Lega Basket Serie A, known as the Foxy Cup for sponsorship reasons, was the 80th season of the Lega Basket Serie A, the highest professional basketball league in Italy.

The regular season ran from 23 September 2001 to 27 April 2002, the playoffs ran from May 2002 to 15 June 2002.

Benetton Treviso won their 3rd title after beating Skipper Bologna 3-0 in the finals series.

== Regular season ==
| Pos | Teams | P | W | L | PF | PA | Qualification or relegation |
|---|---|---|---|---|---|---|---|
| 1 | Skipper Bologna | 36 | 29 | 7 | 3075 | 2807 | Playoffs |
| 2 | Benetton Treviso | 36 | 28 | 8 | 3359 | 2986 | Playoffs |
| 3 | Kinder Bologna | 36 | 28 | 8 | 3121 | 2703 | Playoffs |
| 4 | Oregon Scientific Cantù | 36 | 27 | 9 | 2979 | 2797 | Playoffs |
| 5 | Montepaschi Siena | 36 | 25 | 11 | 2975 | 2714 | Playoffs |
| 6 | Scavolini Pesaro | 36 | 23 | 13 | 3003 | 2892 | Playoffs |
| 7 | Coop Nordest Trieste | 36 | 19 | 17 | 2861 | 2945 | Playoffs |
| 8 | Wurth Roma | 36 | 18 | 18 | 2813 | 2824 | Playoffs |
| 9 | Euro Roseto | 36 | 15 | 21 | 3018 | 3157 | Playoffs |
| 10 | Metis Varese | 36 | 14 | 22 | 3086 | 3149 | Playoffs |
| 11 | Carifac Fabriano | 36 | 14 | 22 | 2983 | 3166 | Playoffs |
| 12 | Snaidero Udine | 36 | 14 | 22 | 2858 | 3166 | Playoffs |
| 13 | Lauretana Biella | 36 | 14 | 22 | 2966 | 3091 | |
| 14 | De Vizia Avellino | 36 | 13 | 23 | 2869 | 2994 | |
| 15 | Müller Verona (Note: Relegated after the season for financial irregularities) | 36 | 13 | 23 | 2852 | 2974 | Relegation to Legadue |
| 16 | Viola Reggio Calabria | 36 | 13 | 23 | 2974 | 3205 | |
| 17 | Adecco Milano | 36 | 12 | 24 | 2953 | 3069 | |
| 18 | Mabo Livorno | 36 | 12 | 24 | 2979 | 3199 | |
| 19 | Fillattice Imola | 36 | 10 | 26 | 2859 | 2956 | Relegation to Legadue |

== Playoffs ==
=== Bracket ===
Round of 16
Roma | 2
Roseto | 0
Siena | 2
Udine | 0
Pesaro | 2
Fabriano | 0
Trieste | 2
Varese | 1

Quarter-finals
Fortitudo Bologna | 3
Roma | 0
Cantù | 3
Siena | 0
Virtus Bologna | 3
Pesaro | 0
Treviso | 3
Trieste | 3

Semi-finals
Fortitudo Bologna | 3
Cantù | 2
Virtus Bologna | 1
Treviso | 3

Final
Fortitudo Bologna | 0
Treviso | 3

Source: Sportstats.com

=== Results ===
1/8 Finals

- Wurth Roma - Euro Roseto 2-0 (100-98, 82-70)
- Montepaschi Siena - Snaidero Udine 2-0 (100-70, 82-76)
- Scavolini Pesaro - Carifac Fabriano 2-0 (99-85, 121-66)
- Coop Nordest Trieste - Metis Varese 2-1 (97-94, 75-84, 95-84)

Bye: Skipper Bologna, Benetton Treviso, Kinder Bologna, Oregon Scientific Cantù

Quarterfinals

- Skipper Bologna - Wurth Roma 3-0 (75-65, 87-86, 100-84)
- Oregon Scientific Cantù - Montepaschi Siena 3-0 (75-68, 69-61, 77-58)
- Kinder Bologna - Scavolini Pesaro 3-0 (76-64, 82-78, 83-80)
- Benetton Treviso - Coop Nordest Trieste 3-0 (118-90, 102-85, 116-68)

Semifinals

- Skipper Bologna - Oregon Scientific Cantù 3-2 (75-56, 69-80, 84-64, 71-76, 68-64)
- Benetton Treviso - Kinder Bologna 3-1 (97-66, 70-95, 93-83, 88-86)

Finals

- Benetton Treviso - Skipper Bologna 3-0 (93-69, 96-85, 20-0 (Note: The match was suspended at 38'58" for invasion, when the result was 89-81. The result was later turned into 20-0 win by forfeit.))
