= Mario Gigena =

Italian basketball player (born 1977)

Personal information
- Born: March 5, 1977 (age 49) Villa del Rosario, Córdoba
- Listed height: 1.98 m (6 ft 6 in)
- Listed weight: 94 kg (207 lb)

Career information
- Playing career: 1995–2015
- Position: Small forward

Career history
- 1995–1999: Pallacanestro Livorno
- 1999–2000: Aurora Jesi
- 2000: Pallacanestro Varese
- 2000–2003: Aurora Jesi
- 2003–2007: Olimpia Milano
- 2007–2009: NSB Rieti
- 2009–2010: Veroli Basket
- 2010–2011: Ostuni Basket
- 2011–2012: Fabriano Basket
- 2012: Basket Recanati
- 2012–2013: Obras Sanitarias
- 2013–2015: Pallacanestro Livorno
Medals
Men's basketball
Representing Italy
Mediterranean Games
Bronze medal – third place	2001 Tunis	National Team

Mario Gigena (born March 5, 1977) is an Italian former professional basketball player.
