= 2006–07 Lega Basket Serie A =

Lega Basket Serie A
- Season: 2006–07
- Duration: October 8, 2006 – June 17, 2007
- Games played: 34
- Teams: 18

Regular season
- Top seed: Montepaschi Siena
- Season MVP: (United States) Terrell McIntyre
- Relegated: Bipop Carire Reggio Emilia; TDShop.it Livorno

Finals
- Champions: Montepaschi Siena; 2nd title
- Runners-up: VidiVici Bologna
- Semi-finalists: Armani Jeans Milano; Lottomatica Roma
- Finals MVP: (Lithuania) Rimantas Kaukėnas

Statistical leaders
Points	(Puerto Rico) Rick Apodaca	19.8
Rebounds	(Dominican Republic) James Thomas	11.4
Assists	(United States) Michael Jordan	5.4

The 2006–07 Lega Basket Serie A season, known as the Serie A TIM for sponsorship reasons, was the 85th season of the Lega Basket Serie A, the highest professional basketball league in Italy.

The regular season ran from October 8, 2006 to May 2007, 18 teams played 34 games each. The top 8 teams made the play-offs whilst the lowest ranked teams, Bipop Carire Reggio Emilia and TDShop.it Livorno, were relegated to the Legadue.

Montepaschi Siena won their second title by winning the playoff finals series against VidiVici Bologna.

== Regular season 2006/07 ==
Rank	Team	GP	W	L	PF	PA	Coach
1	Montepaschi Siena	34	30	4	2,943	2,522	(Italy) Simone Pianigiani
2	Armani Jeans Milano	34	22	12	2,663	2,579	(Serbia) Aleksandar Đorđević
3	VidiVici Bologna	34	22	12	2,779	2,597	(North Macedonia) Zare Markovski
4	Lottomatica Roma	34	22	12	2,556	2,448	(Croatia) Jasmin Repeša
5	Eldo Napoli	34	19	15	2,648	2,635	(Italy) Piero Bucchi
6	Angelico Biella	34	17	17	2,740	2,721	(Italy) Luca Bechi
7	Whirlpool Varese	34	17	17	2,747	2,692	(Argentina) Ruben Magnano
8	Tisettanta Cantù	34	17	17	2,679	2,721	(Italy) Stefano Sacripanti
9	Premiata Montegranaro	34	16	18	2,699	2,732	(Italy) Stefano Pillastrini
10	Legea Scafati	34	16	18	2,748	2,854	(Croatia) Aza Petrović (first 12 games, 5-7) (Slovenia) Teo Alibegović (last 22 games, 11-11)
11	Benetton Treviso	34	21	13	2,582	2,463	(United States) David Blatt
12	Snaidero Cucine Udine	34	15	19	2,753	2,811	(Italy) Cesare Pancotto
13	Climamio Bologna	34	13	21	2,764	2,775	(Italy) Fabrizio Frates (first 7 games, 3-4) (Italy) Filippo Palumbi (next 1 game, 0-1) (Turkey) Ergin Ataman (next 16 games, 8-8) (Italy) Massimiliano Oldoini (last 10 games, 2-8)
14	Upea Capo d'Orlando	34	13	21	2,524	2,705	(Italy) Giovanni Perdichizzi
15	Siviglia Wear Teramo	34	13	21	2,758	2,744	(Italy) Luca Dalmonte (first 18 games, 7-11) (Italy) Massimo Bianchi (last 16 games, 6-10)
16	Air Avellino	34	12	22	2,648	2,815	(Italy) Matteo Boniciolli
17	Bipop Carire Reggio Emilia	34	12	22	2,560	2,723	(Italy) Renato Pasquali (first 6 games, 2-4) (Italy) Massimiliano Menetti (last 28 games, 10-18)
18	TDShop.it Livorno	34	9	25	2,681	2,935	(Italy) Franco Ciani (first 15 games, 4-11) (Italy) Sandro Dell'Agnello (last 19 games, 5-14)

Teams marked in green qualified for the playoffs. Teams marked in red were relegated to Serie A2. Benetton has been penalized 12 points for signing 19 professional players instead of maximum allowed 18. TDshop.it has been penalized 2 points for budgetary irregularities.

== Playoffs ==
Quarterfinals

- Montepaschi Siena - Tisettanta Cantù 3-0 (95-76, 97-82, 91-60)
- Armani Jeans Milano - Whirlpool Varese 3-1 (75-72, 77-69, 62-71, 88-77)
- VidiVici Bologna - Angelico Biella 3-2 (87-97, 94-69, 104-102, 79-84, 89-72)
- Lottomatica Roma - Eldo Napoli 3-0 (73-57, 68-64, 83-58)

Semifinals

- Montepaschi Siena - Lottomatica Roma 3-1 (74-88, 84-76, 114-108, 70-49)
- VidiVici Bologna - Armani Jeans Milano 3-1 (75-71, 78-81, 80-73, 81-73)

Finals

- Montepaschi Siena - VidiVici Bologna 3-0 (81-71, 86-65, 90-82)

== Individual leaders ==
Statistics are for the regular season.

=== Scoring ===
Rank	Name	Nation	Team	PPG
1.	Rick Apodaca	(Puerto Rico)	Legea Scafati	19.8
2.	Alvin Young	(United States)	Upea Capo d'Orlando	19.7
3.	Ramel Curry	(United States)	Air Avellino	18.7
4.	Anthony Grundy	(United States)	Siviglia Wear Teramo	18.2
5.	Delonte Holland	(United States)	Whirlpool Varese	17.6
6.	Ronald Slay	(United States)	Premiata Montegranaro	17.3
7.	Rimantas Kaukenas	(Lithuania)	Montepaschi Siena	16.8
8.	Erik Daniels	(United States)	Angelico Biella	16.8
9.	Reece Gaines	(United States)	Angelico Biella	16.7
10.	Marco Belinelli	(Italy)	Climamio Bologna	16.0

=== Assists ===
Rank	Name	Nation	Team	APG
1.	Michael Jordan	(United States)	Tisettanta Cantù	5.4
2.	Terrell McIntyre	(United States)	Montepaschi Siena	4.0
3.	Randolph Childress	(United States)	Premiata Montegranaro	4.0
4.	Jason Rowe	(United States)	TDShop.it Livorno	3.9
5.	Duane Woodward	(United States)	Siviglia Wear Teramo	3.8
6.	Nikolaos Zisis	(Greece)	Benetton Treviso	3.8
7.	Jerome Allen	(United States)	Snaidero Cucine Udine	3.6
8.	Tyus Edney	(United States)	Climamio Bologna	3.4
9.	Travis Best	(United States)	VidiVici Bologna	3.3
10.	Rick Apodaca	(Puerto Rico)	Legea Scafati	3.2

=== Rebounds ===
Rank	Name	Nation	Team	RPG
1.	James Thomas	(United States)	Climamio Bologna	11.4
2.	Erik Daniels	(United States)	Angelico Biella	10.1
3.	Travis Watson	(United States)	Armani Jeans Milano	9.7
4.	Jack Michael Martínez	(Dominican Republic)	Legea Scafati	9.3
5.	Brandon Hunter	(United States)	TDShop.it Livorno	8.6
6.	Joseph Blair	(United States)	Armani Jeans Milano	8.3
7.	Ronald Slay	(United States)	Premiata Montegranaro	7.6
8.	Harold Jamison	(United States)	Air Avellino	7.5
9.	Cory Violette	(United States)	Bipop Carire Reggio Emilia	7.1
10.	Mason Rocca	(Italy)	Eldo Napoli	6.9

== See also ==
- LBA
