= Gianluca Basile =

Italian basketball player (born 1975)

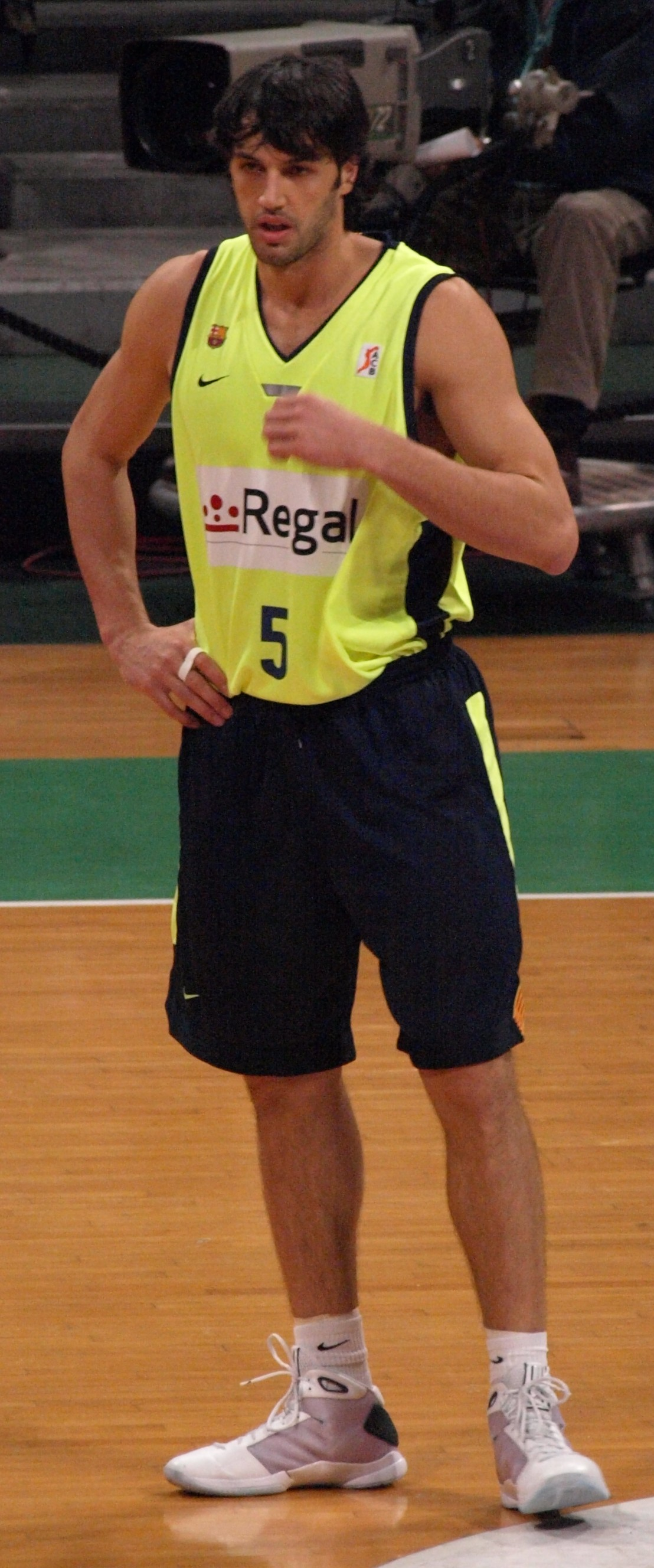
- Basile with FC Barcelona in 2009

Personal information
- Born: 24 January 1975 (age 51) Ruvo di Puglia, Italy
- Listed height: 6 ft 3.75 in (1.92 m)
- Listed weight: 210 lb (95 kg)

Career information
- NBA draft: 1997: undrafted
- Playing career: 1995–2016
- Position: Point guard / shooting guard

Career history
- 1995–1999: Reggiana
- 1999–2005: Fortitudo Bologna
- 2005–2011: Barcelona
- 2011–2012: Cantù
- 2012–2013: Olimpia Milano
- 2013–2016: Orlandina

Career highlights
- EuroLeague champion (2010); 2× Spanish League champion (2009, 2011); 3× Spanish Cup winner (2007, 2010, 2011); 2× Spanish Supercup winner (2009, 2010); 2× Italian League champion (2000, 2005); Italian League MVP (2004); Italian League Finals MVP (2005); Order of Merit of the Italian Republic (2004)
Medals
Representing Italy
Men's basketball
Summer Olympic Games
Silver medal – second place	Athens 2004
EuroBasket
Gold medal – first place	France 1999
Bronze medal – third place	Sweden 2003
Mediterranean Games
Silver medal – second place	Italy 1997

Gianluca Basile (born 24 January 1975) is an Italian former professional basketball player. At a height of 1.92 m (6'3 3/4") tall and a weight of 95 kg (210 lbs.), he mainly played at the shooting guard position. He is considered one of the best 1990s and 2000s era Italian basketball players. He won the silver medal at the 2004 Summer Olympic Games, and the gold medal at the 1999 EuroBasket. He was also the captain of the men's Italy national team.

== Professional career ==
Basile played four years with Italian club Pallacanestro Reggiana, and seven years with Fortitudo Bologna, with whom he won two LBA championships, as the team's captain. In 2005, he moved to Spanish club FC Barcelona. In July 2011, he signed a two-year deal with Italian club Pallacanestro Cantù.

On 6 July 2012 Italian club Emporio Armani Milano, officially announced the signing of Basile, to a one-year contract. His contract with the team expired on 30 June 2013 and he became a free agent.

He finished his career with Italian club Orlandina Basket, and last played in the 2015–16 season.

== National team career ==
Basile was the leader of the men's Italy national basketball team that won the silver medal at the 2004 Summer Olympics in Athens, which was the best result for Italy since they took the silver medal at the 1980 Summer Olympics. He also helped Italy beat Team USA, by a score of 95-78, by scoring 25 points in a pre-Olympic friendly game against the US in 2004. His medals with the Italy national team also include a gold medal at the EuroBasket 1999, a bronze medal at the EuroBasket 2003, and a silver medal at the 1997 Mediterranean Games.

== Player profile ==
Basile excelled in the role of shooting guard, or point forward, and was a very effective three-point shooter. He invented and named the "tiro ignorante" ("ignorant shot"), a three-point shot taken under difficult conditions, and which would surprise his opponents.

== Career statistics ==
Legend
GP	Games played	GS	Games started	MPG	Minutes per game
FG%	Field-goal percentage	3P%	3-point field-goal percentage	FT%	Free-throw percentage
RPG	Rebounds per game	APG	Assists per game	SPG	Steals per game
BPG	Blocks per game	PPG	Points per game	PIR	Performance index rating
**Bold**	Career high

=== EuroLeague ===
†	Denotes season in which Basile won the EuroLeague
*	Led the league

Year	Team	GP	GS	MPG	FG%	3P%	FT%	RPG	APG	SPG	BPG	PPG	PIR
2000–01	Fortitudo Bologna	18	14	27.3	.417	.311	.729	3.1	2.2	1.5	.2	9.9	9.5
2001–02	Fortitudo Bologna	17	14	32.3	.442	.430	.732	2.2	3.2	1.6	**.4**	11.8	12.4
2002–03	Fortitudo Bologna	19	17	**33.6**	.404	.359	.860	3.1	**3.4**	1.7	.2	**13.8**	11.7
2003–04	Fortitudo Bologna	17	12	29.3	.396	.387	.833	2.6	2.9	1.3	—	12.1	11.5
2004–05	Fortitudo Bologna	20	**18**	30.4	.401	.358	.902	**3.8**	2.9	**2.0**	.1	12.6	**12.6**
2005–06	Barcelona	**23**	6	23.5	.364	.294	.814	2.2	1.6	1.0	.2	8.7	7.9
2006–07	Barcelona	22	12	26.6	.465	.440	.741	2.5	1.6	1.1	.1	9.6	8.5
2007–08	Barcelona	22	**18**	26.1	.379	.283	.771	2.9	1.5	1.3	.0	9.9	8.3
2008–09	Barcelona	**23***	13	23.3	**.500**	**.506**	.889	2.1	1.7	1.2	—	7.8	8.6
2009–10†	Barcelona	18	0	17.3	.289	.294	.750	1.9	.8	.4	—	4.1	2.1
2011–12	Cantù	15	5	21.9	.422	.430	.833	1.9	3.1	.1	—	10.0	9.5
2012–13	Milano	9	0	11.7	.409	.316	**1.000**	.6	.7	.2	—	3.3	1.6
Career		223	129	25.9	.408	.366	.811	2.5	2.1	1.2	.1	9.7	8.9

== Honors and awards ==
=== Fortitudo Bologna ===
- 2× Italian League Champion: (2000, 2005)

=== FC Barcelona ===
- 2× Spanish League Champion: (2008–09, 2010–11)
- 3× Spanish Cup Winner: (2007, 2010, 2011)
- 2× Spanish Super Cup Winner: (2009, 2010)
- EuroLeague Champion: (2009–10)

=== Italy national team ===
- 1997 Mediterranean Games: Silver
- 1999 EuroBasket: Gold
- 2003 EuroBasket: Bronze
- 2004 Summer Olympic Games: Silver

=== Individual ===
- Italian League MVP: (2004)
- Italian League Finals MVP: (2005)
- Officer of the Order of Merit of the Italian Republic - Rome, 27 September 2004. The initiative of the President of the Republic.
