= Attilio Caja =

Italian professional basketball coach

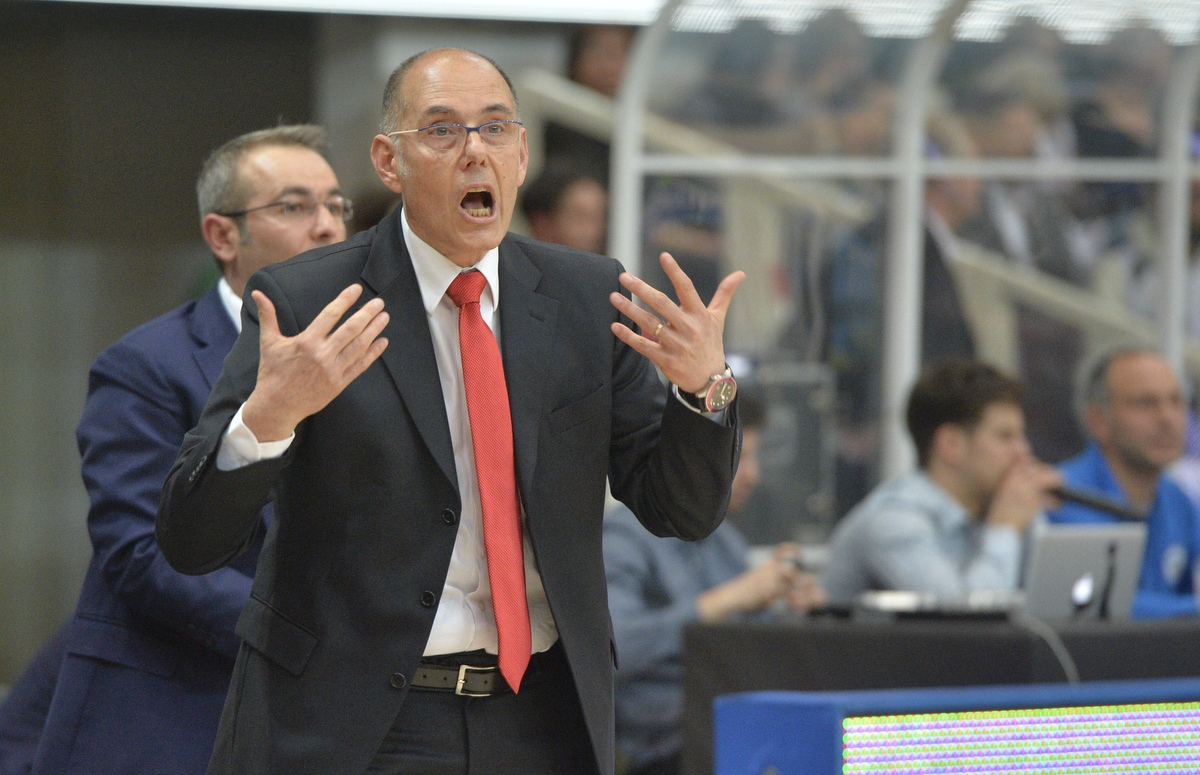
- Caja with Pallacanestro Varese in 2015

Fortitudo Bologna
- Position: Head coach
- League: Serie A2

Personal information
- Born: 20 May 1961 (age 65) Pavia, Italy

Career history

Coaching
- 1992–1994: Pallacanestro Pavia
- 1994–1999: Virtus Roma
- 1997: Italy national basketball team
- 1999–2000: Victoria Libertas Pesaro
- 2000–2002: Virtus Roma
- 2002–2004: Olimpia Milano
- 2004–2005: Basket Napoli
- 2005–2006: Roseto Sharks
- 2006: Aironi Basket Novara
- 2007–2008: Olimpia Milano
- 2008: Pallalcesto Amatori Udine
- 2010: Vanoli Cremona
- 2010–2011: Basket Rimini Crabs
- 2011–2012: Vanoli Cremona
- 2013–2014: Affrico Firenze
- 2015: Pallacanestro Varese
- 2015–2016: Virtus Roma
- 2016–2020: Pallacanestro Varese
- 2021–2022: Reggio Emilia
- 2022–2023: Scafati Basket
- 2023–present: Fortitudo Bologna

Career highlights
- As head coach: Italian League Best Coach (1996); Italian Supercup winner (2000)
Medals
Men's basketball
Head Coach for Italy
Mediterranean Games
Silver medal – second place	1997 Bari	National Team

Attilio Caja (born 20 May 1961 in Pavia, Italy) is an Italian professional basketball coach, currently serving as the head coach for Fortitudo Bologna of the Italian Serie A2.

== Coaching career ==
He was head-coach of the Italian national basketball team in 1997, and led them to the silver medal at the 1997 Mediterranean Games.

His first time as a head coach was with Pallacanestro Pavia in 1992.

Since 2016 he is the head-coach of the Italian basketball team Pallacanestro Varese.

In 2021 he signed a contract with Reggio Emilia to replace Antimo Martino.

On November 9, 2022, he signed with Scafati Basket of the Italian Lega Basket Serie A (LBA).

== Honors and titles ==
Head coach

- Italian Supercup: 1

Virtus Roma: 2000

- LBA Best Coach: 1

Virtus Roma: 1996
