= Massimo Bulleri =

Italian basketball player & coach (born 1977)

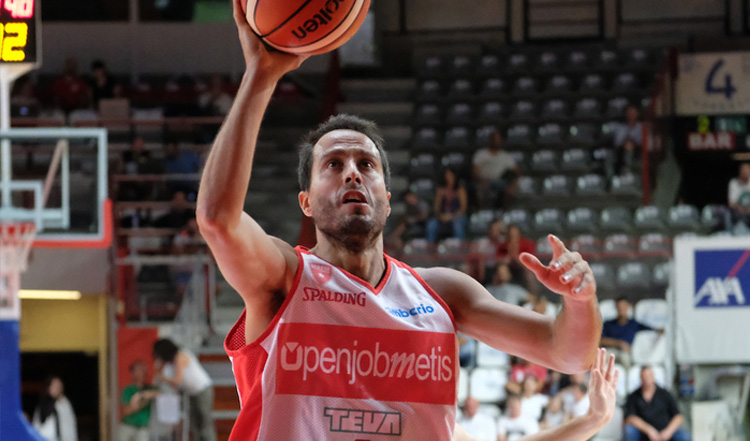
- Bulleri as a player for Varese

Personal information
- Born: 10 September 1977 (age 49) Cecina, Italy
- Listed height: 188 cm (6 ft 2 in)
- Listed weight: 86 kg (190 lb)

Career information
- NBA draft: 1999: undrafted
- Playing career: 1996–2017
- Position: Point guard / shooting guard
- Number: 5, 9, 11, 12
- Coaching career: 2017–present

Career history

Playing
- 1996–1997: Sporting Club Gira
- 1997–1998: Bears Mestre
- 1998: Benetton Treviso
- 1998–1999: Libertas Forlì
- 1999–2005: Benetton Treviso
- 2005–2008: Olimpia Milano
- 2008: Virtus Bologna
- 2008–2009: Olimpia Milano
- 2009: Benetton Treviso
- 2009–2010: Olimpia Milano
- 2010–2012: Benetton Treviso
- 2012–2013: Reyer Venezia Mestre
- 2013–2015: New Basket Brindisi
- 2015–2016: Ferentino
- 2016–2017: Pallacanestro Varese

Coaching
- 2017–2019: Pallacanestro Varese (assistant)
- 2019–2020: Ravenna Piero Manetti (assistant)
- 2020–2021: Pallacanestro Varese
- 2021–2022: Pallacanestro Orzinuovi
- 2022–2023: Limoges CSP (assistant)
- 2023–2025: Dinamo Sassari (assistant)
- 2025–2026: Dinamo Sassari

Career highlights
- As player: FIBA Saporta Cup champion (1999); 2× Italian League champion (2002, 2003); 4× Italian Cup winner (2000, 2003–2005); 2× Italian Super Cup winner (2001, 2002); 2× Italian League MVP (2003, 2005); Italian Cup MVP (2005); 3× Italian League All-Star (2004–2006); Italian League All-Star Game MVP (2006); Order of Merit of the Italian Republic (2004)
Medals
Representing Italy
Men's basketball
EuroBasket
Bronze medal – third place	2003 Sweden
Summer Olympic Games
Silver medal – second place	2004 Athens
Mediterranean Games
Bronze medal – third place	2001 Tunisia

Massimo "Bullo" Bulleri (born 10 September 1977) is an Italian professional basketball coach and former player. During his playing career, standing at a height of 1.88 m (6 ft 2 in) tall, he played at the point guard and shooting guard positions. He was most recently the head coach for Dinamo Sassari in the Italian Lega Basket Serie A (LBA).

== Professional playing career ==
During his pro club career, Bulleri won the European-wide secondary level FIBA Saporta Cup's 1998–99 season championship, and two Italian League championships, in 2002 and 2003. He also won four Italian Cup titles, (2000, 2003, 2004, and 2005), and two Italian Super Cup titles, in 2001 and 2002. He was the voted the Italian League's MVP, in both 2003 and 2005. He was also voted the MVP of the Italian Cup, in 2005.

In 2017, Bulleri retired from playing professional club basketball.

== National team playing career ==
Bulleri was a member of the senior men's Italian national basketball team. With Italy, he played at the 2003 EuroBasket, where he won a bronze medal, at the 2005 EuroBasket, and at the 2007 EuroBasket. He also won the silver medal with the senior Italian national team at the 2004 Athens Summer Olympic Games.

== Coaching career ==
After he retired from playing pro club basketball, Bulleri began working as a basketball coach. In 2017, he became an assistant coach with the Italian League club Varese. On 6 July 2019 Bulleri signed with the Italian 2nd Division club Ravenna Piero Manetti, to work with the team as an assistant coach.

On 8 September 2020 Bulleri was called by Pallacanestro Varese to replace Attilio Caja as head coach; he signed for the 2020–21 season with an option for the next year. Even though he managed to save the team from the relegation to the Serie A2, the option was not used and Buller left the Varese.

On 23 January 2025 he became the head coach of Dinamo Sassari in the Italian Lega Basket Serie A (LBA), to replace Nenad Marković.

== Honors and awards as a player ==
=== Pro clubs ===
- FIBA Saporta Cup Champion: 1999
- 4× Italian Cup Winner: 2000, 2003, 2004, 2005
- 2× Italian Supercup Winner: 2001, 2002
- 2× Italian League Champion: 2002, 2003
- 3× Italian League All-Star: 2004, 2005, 2006
- Italian League All-Star Game MVP: 2006

=== Italian national team ===
- 2001 Mediterranean Games: Bronze
- 2003 EuroBasket: Bronze
- 2004 Summer Olympic Games: Silver

=== Individual ===
- 2× Italian League MVP: 2003, 2005
- Italian Cup MVP: 2005
- Officer of the Order of Merit of the Italian Republic - Rome, 27 September 2004. The initiative of the President of the Republic.
