= Tonino Zorzi =

Italian basketball player and coach (1935–2023)

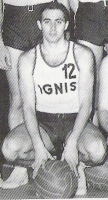
- Born: 10 June 1935; Gorizia, Italy
- Died: 19 August 2023 (aged 88); Gorizia, Italy

Antonio "Tonino" Zorzi (10 June 1935 – 19 August 2023) was an Italian professional basketball player and head coach. He was nicknamed Paròn.

== Life and career ==
Born in Gorizia, Zorzi started playing basket in his city team Goriziana before moving to Pallacanestro Varese, with whom he won the title as Serie A top scorer in the 1954–55 season as well as the team's first Scudetto in 1961. He also played 22 matches with the Italian national team, making his debut at EuroBasket 1953. After his retirement in 1962, Zorzi started a long and fruitful career as head coach, whose achievements include five promotions from A2 to Serie A and the 1970 victory of the FIBA Saporta Cup with Partenope Napoli Basket. He also served as the vice coach of Sandro Gamba in the Italian national team, winning a silver medal at EuroBasket 1991.

During his career Zorzi received various honors, including the induction in the Italian Basketball Hall of Fame and in the Pallacanestro Varese Hall of Fame, in which he was named best player of all time. He died on 19 August 2023, at the age of 88.
