= Andrea Costa Imola =

- Leagues: Serie A2 Basket
- Founded: 4 November 1967; 58 years ago
- Arena: PalaRuggi
- Capacity: 2,000
- Location: Imola, Italy
- President: Gian Piero Domenicali
- General manager: Alex Petrilli

Andrea Costa Imola is an Italian professional basketball team based in Imola, Emilia-Romagna. The side is playing in the second division Serie A2 as of the 2015-16 season.

== History ==
Andrea Costa Basket was founded on 4 October 1967, with the name an hommage to a former Imola of the same name. The club started playing in the amateur Prima divisione before moving up to the Promozione after one season, staying there until 1980-81. Playing one season in Serie D, the side then was promoted to the Serie C2 where it would play from 1982 to 1986 after which it joined the Serie B2. It won the league on its first try, moving up to the highest amateur division, the Serie B1, where it would stay for eight years. At the end of the 1994-95 season, Andrea Costa won a promotion to the professional Serie A2.

The 1996-97 would see Imola beat favourites Livorno in the promotion playoffs and reach the Serie A. Under the leadership of Vincenzo Esposito, the side reached the playoffs in 1998-99, losing in the quarterfinals to rivals Fortitudo Bologna. The club managed to qualify for European competitions in 1999-2000 (Korać Cup) and 2000-01 (Saporta Cup) but would be relegated at the end of 2001. The next decade was more difficult for Imola, with the club relegated thrice on the court (2004, 2007, 2009) before being saved by other club's bankruptcies.

== Arena ==
Andrea Costa played in the PalaRuggi until 1995, with the promotion to the Serie A2 meaning the side had to find a suitable arena, moving to the Palatenda. Another promotion to the Serie A in 1998, meant the side had to move again, this time to the PalaCattani in neighbouring Faenza. Later returning to the PalaRuggi, the side plays there as of the 2015-16 season.

== 2015–16 roster ==
Note: Flags indicate national team eligibility at FIBA-sanctioned events. Players may hold other non-FIBA nationalities not displayed.

Andrea Costa Imola roster
Players
Coaches

Pos.	No.	Nat.	Name	Ht.	Wt.	Age
PG	0	(Italy)	Tassinari, Andrea	1.82 m (6 ft 0 in)	71 kg (157 lb)	29 – 12 June 1996
PG	2	(United States)	Cohn, Travis	1.88 m (6 ft 2 in)	79 kg (174 lb)	36 – 3 June 1989
C	5	(Italy)	Maggioli, Michele	2.13 m (7 ft 0 in)	108 kg (238 lb)	48 – 15 July 1977
C	9	(Italy)	Borra, Jacopo	2.19 m (7 ft 2 in)	100 kg (220 lb)	35 – 9 May 1990

Head coach

- (Italy) Massimiliano Menetti

Assistant coach(es)

- (Italy) Devis Cagnardi
- (Lithuania) Donatas Slanina

Legend

- (C) Team captain
- Injured

- Roster
Updated: 1 September 2015

== Notable former players ==
2000's

- (Italy) Pietro Aradori 1 season: '06-'07
- (United States) Darren Kelly 1 season: '06-'07
- (Dominican Republic) (United Kingdom) Nicholas James George 1 season: '06-'07
- (United States) (Italy) Donte Mathis 1 season: '06-'07
- (United States) BJ McKie 1 season: '05-'06
- (Italy) David Brkic 1 season: '05-'06
- (United States) Bingo Merriex 1 season: '04-'05
- (United States) Michael Campbell 1 season: '04-'05
- (United States) Jobey Thomas 1 season: '03-'04
- (United States) Elton Tyler 1 season: '03-'04
- (United States) Gerrod Abram 1 season: '03-'04
- (United States) Michael Hicks 2 seasons: '02-'03, '05-'06
- (United States) (Italy) Brian Shorter 1 season: '02-'03
- (United States) Harper Williams 1 season: '01-'02
- (United States) Sylvester Gray 1 season: '01-'02
- (Uruguay) (Italy) Juan Manuel Moltedo 2 seasons: '00-'02
- (United States) Marques Bragg 1 season: '00-'01
- (United States) Kevin Thompson 1 season: '00-'01
- (Finland) Tuukka Kotti

1990's

- (United States) Brian Evans 1 season: '99-'00
- (The Bahamas) Ian Lockhart 1 season: '99-'00
- (Italy) Vincenzo Esposito 5 seasons: '98-'01, '02-'03, '04-'05
- (United States) Yamen Sanders 2 seasons: '98-'99, '00-'01
- (United States) Christopher Jent 1 season: '98-'99
- (United States) Steve Burtt Sr. 1 season: '97-'98
- (United States) (Italy) Matthew Alosa 1 season: '96-'97
- (Italy) Gianluca Lulli 1 season: '96-'97
- (Italy) Paolo Bortolon 4 seasons: '95-'99
- (Italy) Francesco Foiera 4 seasons: '95-'99
- (United States) Bill Jones 3 seasons: '95-'98

== Sponsorship names ==
Throughout the years, due to sponsorship, the club has been known as:

- Benati Imola (1990–91)
- Leonardo Imola (1991–93)
- Fanti Imola (1993–95)
- Casetti Imola (1995–98)
- Termal Imola (1998–99)
- Lineltex Imola (1999-2001)
- Fillattice Imola (2001–02)
- Esse.Ti Imola (2002–03)
- Zarotti Imola (2005–07)
