= 2012–13 Lega Basket Serie A =

Lega Basket Serie A
- Season: 2012–13
- Dates: 26 September 2012 – 19 June 2013
- Teams: 16

Regular season
- Top seed: Cimberio Varese
- Season MVP: (Italy) Luigi Datome
- Relegated: Angelico Biella

Finals
- Champions: ~~Montepaschi Siena~~
- Runners-up: Acea Roma
- Finals MVP: (Italy) Daniel Hackett

Statistical leaders
Points	(United States) Donell Taylor	18.6
Rebounds	(Nigeria) Gani Lawal	8.4
Assists	(United States) Travis Diener	7.1

The 2012–13 Lega Basket Serie A was the 91st season of the Lega Basket Serie A, the top level basketball league in Italy. The season started 26 September 2012 and ended on 19 June 2013. Montepaschi Siena initially won the championship. However, their championship was revoked in 2016 after investigations exposed financial and fiscal fraud.

== Teams ==
- Acea Roma
- Angelico Biella
- Banco di Sardegna Sassari
- chebolletta Cantù
- Cimberio Varese
- EA7 Emporio Armani Milano
- Montepaschi Siena
- Enel Brindisi
- Juve Caserta
- SAIE3 Bologna
- Scavolini Banca Marche Pesaro
- Sidigas Avellino
- Sutor Montegranaro
- Trenkwalder Reggio Emilia
- Umana Venezia
- Vanoli Cremona

== Regular season ==
#	Teams	P	W	L	PF	PA	Qualification or relegation
1	Cimberio Varese	30	23	7	2519	2311	Playoffs
2	Banco di Sardegna Sassari	30	22	8	2677	2513	Playoffs
3	Acea Roma	30	20	10	2361	2273	Playoffs
4	EA7 Emporio Armani Milano	30	19	11	2441	2304	Playoffs
5	Montepaschi Siena	30	18	12	2309	2160	Playoffs
6	Trenkwalder Reggio Emilia	30	18	12	2328	2201	Playoffs
7	Lenovo Cantù	30	17	13	2222	2051	Playoffs
8	Umana Venezia	30	16	14	2370	2354	Playoffs
9	JuveCaserta	30	13	17	2164	2310	
10	Sidigas Avellino	30	13	17	2294	2431	
11	Vanoli Cremona	30	13	17	2397	2413	
12	Enel Brindisi	30	11	19	2441	2483	
13	Sutor Montegranaro	30	11	19	2489	2570	
14	SAIE3 Bologna	30	10	20	2249	2405	
15	Scavolini Banca Marche Pesaro	30	10	20	2245	2383	
16	Angelico Biella	30	6	24	2168	2512	Relegation to Lega Due

== Playoffs ==
Quarterfinals
1	Cimberio Varese	4
8	Umana Venezia	1
4	Emporio Armani Milano	3
5	Montepaschi Siena	4
2	Banco di Sardegna Sassari	3
7	Lenovo Cantù	4
3	Acea Roma	4
6	Trendwalker Reggio Emilia	3

Semifinals
1	Cimberio Varese	3
5	Montepaschi Siena	4
7	Lenovo Cantù	3
3	Acea Roma	4

Finals
5	Montepaschi Siena	4
3	Acea Roma	1
