= Carlo Recalcati =

Italian basketball player and coach

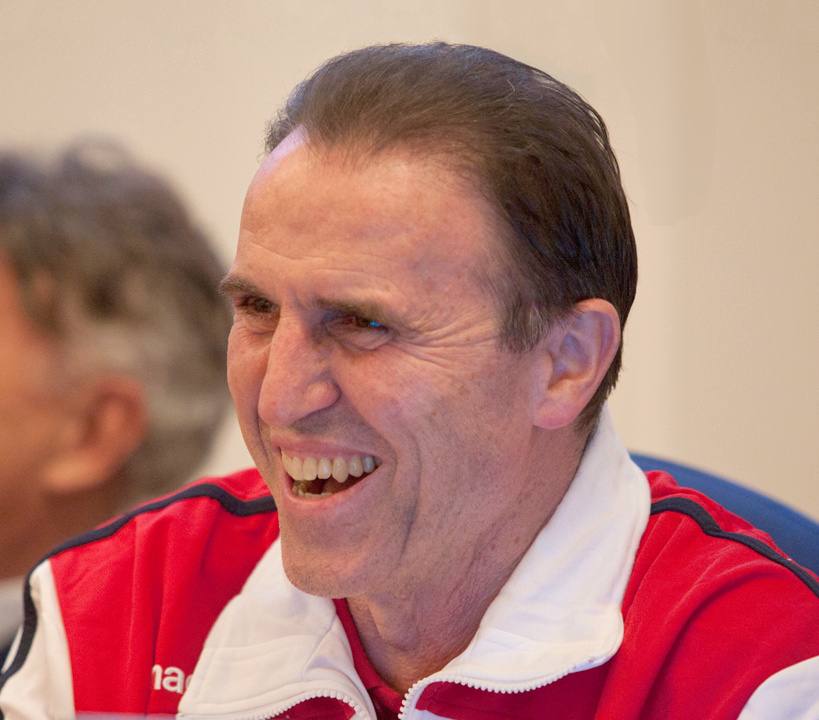
- Recalcati in 2010

Personal information
- Born: September 11, 1945 (age 81) Milan, Italy
- Listed height: 6 ft 0 in (1.83 m)
- Listed weight: 175 lb (79 kg)

Career information
- Playing career: 1962–1981
- Position: Shooting guard / small forward
- Coaching career: 1980–2018

Career history

Playing
- 1962–1979: Cantù
- 1979–1981: Pallacanestro Parma

Coaching
- 1980–1981: Pallacanestro Parma
- 1981–1984: Alpe Bergamo
- 1984–1990: Cantù
- 1990–1995: Viola Reggio Calabria
- 1995: Teorematour Milano
- 1996–1997: Celana Bergamo
- 1997–1999: Varese
- 1999–2001: Fortitudo Bologna
- 2001–2009: Italy
- 2003–2006: Montepaschi Siena
- 2010–2012: Varese
- 2012–2014: Sutor Montegranaro
- 2014–2016: Reyer Venezia
- 2017: Cantù
- 2018: Auxilium Torino

Career highlights
- As player: FIBA World Club Cup champion (1975); 3× FIBA Saporta Cup champion (1977–1979); 3× FIBA Korać Cup champion (1973–1975); 2× Italian League champion (1968, 1975); As head coach: 2× FIBA EuroStar (1999, 2007); 3× Italian League champion (1999, 2000, 2004); 2× Italian Supercup winner (2000, 2005); 2× Italian League Best Coach (1999, 2004); 2× Italian 2nd Division champion (1983, 1992); Order of Merit of the Italian Republic (2004); Italian Basketball Hall of Fame (2007)

Career statistics
Medals
Representing Italy
Men's basketball
Summer Olympic Games
Silver medal – second place	2004 Athens
FIBA EuroBasket
Bronze medal – third place	1971 West Germany
Bronze medal – third place	1975 Yugoslavia
Bronze medal – third place	2003 Sweden
Mediterranean Games
Gold medal – first place	2005 Spain
European Championship for Juniors
Bronze medal – third place	1964 Italy	Under-18 Team

Carlo Recalcati (born September 11, 1945, in Milan, Italy) is an Italian professional basketball coach, and a former player.

He was the head coach of the senior Italian national basketball team, from 2001 to 2009, and led them to the silver medal at the 2004 Summer Olympic Games, and the bronze medal at the EuroBasket 2003.

== Playing career ==
As a player on the club level, Recalcati played for Pallacanestro Cantù (1962–1979, winning the Italian League championship in 1968 and 1975), and Pallacanestro Parma (1979–1981). He also played for the senior Italian national team, from 1967 to 1975 (winning the bronze at EuroBasket 1971 and EuroBasket 1975).

== Coaching career ==
As a basketball coach, Recalcati coached Pallacanestro Parma (1980–81), Alpe Bergamo (1982–84), Pallacanestro Cantù (1984–90, reached the final in the FIBA Korać Cup in the 1988–89 season), Viola Reggio Calabria (1990–95), Teorematour Milano (1995), Pallacanestro Varese (1997–1999, won the Italian League championship in the 1998–99 season), Fortitudo Bologna (1999–01, won the Italian League championship in the 1999–00 season), and Montepaschi Siena (2003–06, won the Italian League championship in the 2003–04 season, and the Italian Supercup, in the 2004–05 season.

On January 16, 2018, Recalcati became the new head coach of Fiat Torino.

== Orders ==
Order of Merit of the Italian Republic, 4th Class: 2004
