= Cesare Pancotto =

Italian basketball coach

Personal information
- Born: January 8, 1955 (age 71) Porto San Giorgio, Italy
- Position: Assistant coach
- Coaching career: 1982–present

Career history

Coaching
- 1982–1986: U.S. Sangiorgese
- 1986–1987: Pallacanestro Reggiana
- 1987–1989: Fulgor Libertas Forlì
- 1989–1990: Dinamo Sassari
- 1990–1993: Olimpia Pistoia
- 1993–1997: Mens Sana Siena
- 1997–1999: Pallacanestro Trieste
- 1999–2000: Virtus Roma
- 2001–2004: Pallacanestro Trieste
- 2004–2005: Teramo Basket
- 2005–2008: Pallalcesto Udine
- 2008–2009: Fortitudo Bologna
- 2009–2010: Scandone Avellino
- 2010–2012: Basket Barcellona
- 2012–2013: Scandone Avellino
- 2013–2016: Vanoli Cremona
- 2018–2019: Montegranaro
- 2019–2021: Pallacanestro Cantù
- 2022–2024: Napoli Basket (assistant)

Career highlights
- As coach: 3x Italian Second Division Champion (1992, 1994, 1999); 2x Italian League Best Coach (2006, 2016)

Cesare Pancotto (born January 8, 1955) is an Italian professional basketball coach.

== Coaching career ==
After a good career spent playing point guard in his native Porto San Giorgio, Pancotto began coaching in 1982 at the age of 27, taking the bench of his hometown team, U.S. Sangiorgese, at only three matches from the end of the season, gaining promotion to Serie B. In 1984 Sangiorgese, always guided by Pancotto, was promoted to A2, the Italian Second Division. The coach remained in Porto San Giorgio until 1986, coaching two seasons in A2 avoiding in both cases the relegation.

In the 1986-1987 season he arrived in Reggio Emilia. Then, he coached for two years Forlì, for a year Dinamo Sassari and for three years Olimpia Pistoia: in Tuscany he obtained the first of three promotion to A1, the top Italian League. He also led Pistoia to the A1 playoffs.

In the 1993-1994 season he arrived in Siena: he will coach the local Mens Sana for the following four years. In his first season, he gained promotion to A1, while in the later years he led the team to the A1 playoffs twice and achieved qualification for the Korac Cup.

In 1997 he coached the Pallacanestro Triestina, an historical club based in Trieste. In this season, he obtained his third promotion to the top Italian League. After two years spent there, he passed to Virtus Roma. In February 2001 he went back to Trieste and remained there until 2004. In the 2001-02 season got 7th place, in the following season the 10th place while in the 2003-04 season he could not avoid the relegation of the team with a corporate failure of the Pallacanestro Triestina.

In the 2004-2005 season he got a 9th place in Serie A with Teramo Basket. Then, he spent three years coaching Snaidero Udine: the first year he got an excellent 5th place while in the others he got two salvation, adding a good participation in the ULEB Cup, the second European club competition.

In the 2008-09 season, he took the place of Dragan Šakota after 10 matches on the bench of the glorious team Fortitudo Bologna but, despite a promising final rush, he was unable to avoid relegation. The season finished with a lot of controversies and bitterness because of a malfunctioning of the "Stop-Lamp" and "Precision Time" during the last match, which condemned the team to relegation.

In summer 2009 he was hired by Air Avellino, with the possibility of forming the roster following his directions with an eye on the budget, reduced from the disappointing previous season. On May 29, 2010 by mutual agreement with the company terminates the contract with Air Avellino, ending the adventure in Irpinia having obtained salvation and the Italian Cup semi-final.

Less than a month later, he signed with Basket Barcellona, a Sicilian team just promoted in Legadue. After a season and a half, he resigned from Barcellona in February 2012. On January 17, 2013 replaced the outgoing Gianluca Tucci at the helm of Scandone Avellino and remained there until the end of the season. On December 10 of the same year, he becomes the new coach of Vanoli Cremona.

On June 14, 2019, he has signed 1+1 year contract with Pallacanestro Cantù of the Italian Lega Basket Serie A (LBA). The 2020–21 season was not a successful year for Pancotto and his team: after 16 games in the 14th position out of 15 team he was sacked from Cantù.

On June 6, 2022, he signed with Napoli Basket to become the assistant coach of the team. On January 3, 2023, after the dismissal of coach Maurizio Buscaglia, he became the head coach of the team.
