= Pallacanestro Roseto =

Italian basketball club

- Leagues: Serie B
- Founded: 1946; 80 years ago
- History: Roseto Basket; 1946–2001; Roseto Sharks; 2001–2006; Pallacanestro Roseto 1946; 2008–2009; Roseto Sharks; 2009–2020; Pallacanestro Roseto; 2020–present
- Arena: PalaMaggetti
- Location: Roseto degli Abruzzi, Italy
- Team colors: Blue, White
- Website: pallacanestrorosetossd.com

Pallacanestro Roseto is an Italian professional basketball club based in Roseto degli Abruzzi. They play in the third division Serie B as of the 2024–25 season.

== Sponsorship names ==
The club has had several denominations through the years due to sponsorship:

- Cover Jeans Roseto (1982–1983)
- Cordivari Roseto (1998–2001)
- Euro Roseto (2001–2004)
- Sedima Roseto (2004–2005)
- BT Roseto (2005–2006)
- Seven 2007 Roseto (2008–2009)
- Mec-Energy Roseto (2011–2013)
- Modus-FM Roseto (2013-2014)
- Industriale Sud - Roseto (2014-2015)
- Mec-Energy Roseto (2015–2016)
- Cimorosi Roseto (2016-2018)
- Sapori Veri Roseto (2018-2020)
- Liofilchem Roseto (2020-…)

== Notable players ==
Note: Flags indicate national team eligibility at FIBA-sanctioned events. Players may hold other non-FIBA nationalities not displayed.

Criteria

To appear in this section a player must have either:

- Set a club record or won an individual award while at the club
- Played at least one official international match for their national team at any time
- Played at least one official NBA match at any time.

- (Italy) Mario Boni (3 seasons: '99–'02)
- (Italy) Leonardo Busca (3 seasons: '98–'00, '05–'06)
- (Italy) Paolo Moretti (2 seasons: '99–'01)
- (Italy) Federico Pieri (2 seasons: '98–'99, '02–'03)
- (The Bahamas) Ian Lockhart (2 seasons: '00–'02)
- (Canada) Peter Guarasci (1 season: '00–'01)
- (Dominican Republic) Luis Flores (1 season: '05–'06)
- (Dominican Republic) Jack Martínez (1 season: '05–'06)
- (Finland) Teemu Rannikko (1 season: '02–'03)
- (Germany) Stephen Arigbabu (1 season: '04–'05)
- (Germany) Misan Nikagbatse (1 season: '04–'05)
- (Greece) Giorgos Diamantopoulos (1 season: '05–'06)
- (Greece) Vangelis Mantzaris (1 season: '23–'24)
- (Serbia) Miroslav Radošević (1 season: '02–'03)
- (Slovenia) Marko Milič (1 season: '02–'03)
- (Spain) Albert Miralles (1 season: '03–'04)
- (United States) Mahmoud Abdul-Rauf (1 season: '04–'05)
- (United States) Andre Brown (1 season: '04–'05)
- (United States) George Gilmore (2 seasons: '00–'02)
- (United States) Adrian Griffin (1 season: '98–'99)
- (United States) Billy Keys (1 season: '03–'04)
- (United States) Rodney Monroe (1 season: '02–'03)
- (United States) Ansu Sesay (1 season: '04–'05)
- (United States) Alvin Sims (1 season: '01–'02)
- (United States) K'Zell Wesson (1 season: '03–'04)
