= Viola Reggio Calabria =

- Nickname: Nero-Arancio (The Black and Oranges)
- Founded: 1966 (refounded 1997, 2009)
- History: List: Cestistica Piero Viola (1966–1997); Basket Viola R.C. (1998); Nuovo Basket Viola Reggio '98 (1998–2007); Team Basket Viola R.C. (2007–2009); Scuola Basket Viola R.C. (2009–2012); Viola Reggio Calabria (2012–2019)
- Arena: PalaCalafiore
- Capacity: 8,500
- Location: Reggio Calabria, Calabria, Italy
- Team colors: Black and Orange
- Championships: 3 Serie A2 Championships
- Website: viola.rc.it
Home	Away

Viola Reggio Calabria is an Italian professional basketball club based in Reggio Calabria, Calabria, Italy.

In its heyday, the club was renowned for discovering talented players who would go on to play at the highest level, for example five former players took part in the 2004 Olympics final. However, Viola was also plagued by financial problems, with the club filing for bankruptcy in three occasions (1997, 2009 and 2019), that later sent it out the Italian elite.

In 2019 a phoenix club, called Viola Supporters Trust, was formed by the fans of Viola Reggio Calabria. It currently plays in Serie B Nazionale, the third tier of the Italian pyramid.

== History ==
The club was founded in 1966 as Cestistica Piero Viola by judge Peppino Viola in honour of his late brother Piero. It started playing in the Serie C that season, replacing AICS Reggio Calabria where Piero Viola had played at that level, finishing ninth. The club would establish itself in the Serie C (renamed Serie B from 1974–75) during the succeeding years. It would reach the professional second division Serie A2 in 1983. After a mid-table finish in its first season, Viola won the league in 1984–85 and earned a promotion to the Serie A. It was relegated after one season, returning in 1989 following a three-year stay in the Serie A2. The newly promoted side had its best ever season for its return to the elite, finishing the regular season in seventh place before losing in the playoff quarterfinals to Pallacanestro Varese, as Viola's Dan Caldwell finished as the league's top scorer.

Carlo Recalcati took over the coaching reins the following season which ended in relegation. The club would bounce back by winning the Serie A2 in 1991–92. It would best its best finish with a sixth place in the 1992–93 Serie A, before a playoff quarterfinals series against Benetton Treviso ended with a disallowed on the buzzer shot that would have tied the game for Viola in the decisive 18 April game.

The club made three other playoff appearances the next four seasons (quarterfinals in 1994 and eighth-finals in 1996 and 1997) with another of its players, Brian Oliver, leading the league in scoring during the 1995–96 season.

The Cestistica Piero Viola organisation would be declared bankrupt in December 1997 (a bankruptcy later revoked due to irregularities), it was replaced in January 1998 by Basket Viola Reggio Calabria SPA and then by Nuovo Basket Viola Reggio '98 the same year. After a parenthesis in the Serie A2 in 1998–99, the club, counting a young Manu Ginóbili in its ranks, again reached the playoff quarterfinals though they were eliminated by Virtus Bologna.

The next season saw Ginóbili leave but players such as Carlos Delfino and Leandro Palladino arrive to help Viola stave off relegation and reach the 2000–01 FIBA Korać Cup Round of 16. After battling relegation again in 2002, Viola returned to the playoffs the following year, with a repeat of the past as they again lost in five games to Benetton Treviso. Nuovo Basket Viola struggled to raise funds prior to the 2004–05 season, with only a last ditch cash injection by the municipality keeping the club, sponsor-less until March 2005, financially afloat. The club would finish in the relegation places in 2005 but kept its top flight status after Scavolini Pesaro folded. It was relegated in 2006, where three successive coaches could not stop the club from moving down to the LegaDue (the renamed second division). Despite securing its LegaDue status on the court in 2007, Viola would see financial difficulties put an end to its professional activity over the summer, with the management unable to raise enough funds to keep the club running.

Viola continued operating only through its youth sector, with the team playing in the Serie D. On 7 July 2009, a new organisation acquired the sporting rights of Basket Gragnano and was admitted into the Serie B Dilettanti. A change in ownership over the 2010 summer saw Giancesare Muscolino become president. The club would finish second during the regular season before losing in the promotion playoffs final to Orlandina Basket. The 2011–12 again saw the team stall in the promotion playoffs but it was admitted into the DNA anyway. The club then successfully fought relegation the following two seasons and with the second and third tier merging in 2015–16, play in the second division as of the 2015–16 season.

== Arena ==
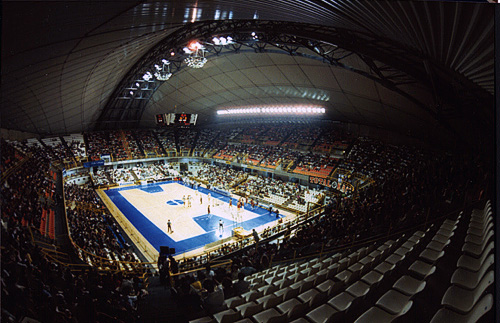
The PalaCalafiore

At the beginning of the 1970s, the club transferred to the Scatolone arena, a small venue containing around 500 seats. With the club promoted to the Serie A2 in 1983, the Scatolone did not answer the league's requirements, a new arena – the Botteghelle – was built over fifty-seven days. In 1991 the PalaCalafiore (full name: Palasport Francesco Calafiore in dedication to a local sports journalist) was built; it is the biggest arena in Calabria and the seventh-largest in Italy, with more than 8,500 seats. Viola still plays in this arena (also known as the PalaPentimele, from the Pentimele neighbourhood it is situated in) as of the 2015–16 season.

== Head coaches ==
- (Italy) Tonino Zorzi 5 seasons: '87–'90, '95–'96, '01 (Jan.)-'02, '06 (Jan.-Mar.)
- (Italy) Carlo Recalcati 5 seasons: '90–'95
- (Italy) Lino Lardo 2 seasons: '02–'04

== Sponsorship names ==
Throughout the years, due to sponsorship deals, it has been also known as:

- Banca Popolare Reggio Calabria (1982–1984)
- Viola Reggio Calabria (1984–1985)
- Opel Reggio Calabria (1985–1986)
- Viola Reggio Calabria (1989–1990)
- Standa Reggio Calabria (1986–1989)
- Panasonic Reggio Calabria (1990–1993)
- Reggio Calabria Pfizer (1993–1995)
- Viola Reggio Calabria (1995–2003)
- Tris Reggio Calabria (2003–2004)
- Eurofiditalia Reggio Calabria (2005)
- Viola Reggio Calabria (2005–2007)
- Liomatic Reggio Calabria (2009–2012)
- Bermè Viola Reggio Calabria (2015–present)

== Notable players ==
2000's

- (United States) Joseph Bunn 1 season: '06–'07
- (Slovenia) Aleksandar Ćapin 1 season: '05–'06
- (United States) A. J. Guyton 1 season: '05–'06
- (United States) Jelani McCoy 1 season: '05–'06
- (United States) Vincent Yarbrough 1 season: '05–'06
- (France) Thierry Zig 1 season: '05–'06
- (United States) Bryce Drew 1 season: '04–'05
- (United States) Terrence Rencher 1 season: '04–'05
- (United States) (Italy) Casey Shaw 1 season: '04–'05
- (United States) LaVell Blanchard 2 seasons: '03–'05
- (Greece) Giorgos Sigalas 1/2 season: '03
- (United States) Titus Ivory 2 seasons: '02–'04
- (United States) Anthony Williams 3 seasons: '01–'03, '06–'07
- (France) Ismaila Sy 2 seasons: '01–'02, '06–'07
- (Uruguay) Nicolás Mazzarino 4 seasons: '01–'05
- (United States) J. J. Eubanks 3 seasons: '01–'04
- (Nigeria) Benjamin Eze 3 seasons: '01–'04
- (Republic of Ireland) Alan Tomidy 2 seasons: '01–'03
- (United States) Brian Evans 1 season: '01–'02
- (United States) Anthony Tucker 1 season: '01–'02
- (United States) David Vaughn 1 season: '01–'02
- (Argentina) Carlos Delfino 2 seasons: '00–'02
- (United States) Mark Anthony Davis 1 season: '00–'01
- (France) Thierry Gadou 1 season: '00–'01
- (Argentina) Leandro Palladino 1 season: '00–'01

1990's

- (Argentina) Alejandro Montecchia 3 seasons: '99–'02
- (United States) Brian Shorter 1 season: '99–'00
- (United States) Kevin Thompson 1 season: '99–'00
- (United States) Brent Scott 2 seasons: '98–'99, '00–'01
- (Argentina) Manu Ginóbili 2 seasons: '98–'00
- (Poland) Jeff Nordgaard 1 season: '98–'99
- (Germany) Christian Welp 1 season: '98–'99
- (Republic of Ireland) Jay Larrañaga 2 seasons: '97–'98, '04–'05
- (Spain) Diego Fajardo 2 seasons: '97–'98, '03–'04
- (United States) Dedric Willoughby 1 seasons: '97–'98
- (United States) Brian Oliver 3 seasons: '96–'97, '98–'00
- (United States) Mike Brown 2 seasons: '96–'98
- (United States) Lance Miller 1 season: '95–'96
- (United States) Yamen Sanders 1 season: '95–'96
- (Italy) Alessandro Fantozzi 1 season: '94–'95
- (United States) Shaun Vandiver 1 season: '94–'95
- (United States) Randy White 1 season: '94–'95
- (United States) Wendell Alexis 1 season: '94–'95
- (United States) Ken Barlow 1 season: '93–'94
- (United States) Kevin Pritchard 1 season: '93–'94
- (Italy) Marco Spangaro 4 seasons: '92–'96
- (Ukraine) Sasha Volkov 1 season: '92–'93
- (Italy) Tiziano Lorenzon 2 seasons: '91–'93
- (United States) Dean Garrett 3 seasons: '90–'93
- (United States) Michael Young 2 seasons: '90–'92
- (United States) Frank Kornet 1 season: '93

1980's

- (Italy) Roberto Bullara 7 seasons: '89–'96
- (United States) Charles Jones 1 season: '89–'90
- (Italy) Alessandro Santoro 12 seasons: '88–'00
- (Italy) Giampiero Savio 2 seasons: '88–'90
- (United States) Robert Lock 1 season: '88–'89
- (United States) Phil Zevenbergen 1 season: '88–'89
- (United States) Dan Caldwell 4 seasons: '87–'91
- (Italy) Gustavo Tolotti 12 seasons: '86–'92, '93–'99
- (United States) Joe Bryant 1 season: '86–'87
- (Italy) Donato Avenia 9 seasons: '84–'90, '92–'93, '96–'98
- (United States) Kim Hughes 5 seasons: '83–'88
