= Pallacanestro Don Bosco Livorno =

- League: Serie C, Group B Toscana
- Founded: 1996
- History: Basket Livorno (1947-2011); Pallacanestro Don Bosco Livorno (1996–present)
- Arena: PalaMacchia (capacity: 2,500)
- Location: Livorno, Tuscany, Italy
- Team colors: Navy and white
- President: Marco Andromedi
- Head coach: Daniele Quilici
- Website: pallacanestrodonbosco.it
Home	Away

Pallacanestro Don Bosco Livorno, founded in 1996, is an Italian basketball club from the town of Livorno, Tuscany, playing in the Serie C (third division) as of October 2026. Formerly a youth section of Basket Livorno, Don Bosco has gone on to be the organisation's flagship team when Libertas Livorno 1947 was bankrupted.

The team, founded in 1947, was formerly in the top division, the 2006-07 season was its last in the Lega Basket Serie A before financial problems and irregularities led to the demise of the club in 2009 (as a sports club) and 2014 (as a company).

== History ==
=== Basket Livorno ===
Basket Livorno was founded in 1947, it languished in the shadows of Libertas Livorno and Pallacanestro Livorno, the strongest clubs of the city, until the demise of Libertas (now an amalgamation of the two clubs) in 1994.

The D’Alesio family would take over Basket Livorno in 1992, under the moniker of Don Bosco Basket. After buying the license of Azzurra Roma, it would join the third tier Serie B1 in 1994. The team earned a promotion to the professional Serie A2 in 1996, the same year the Pallacanestro Don Bosco sports society was founded, it was incorporated as the youth sector of the organisation.

Renamed as Basket Livorno from 1998, the club would see the D'Alesio family withdraw their support in 2000, with the Falsini brothers - through their brand Mabo - taking over the sponsorship the same year. Now a mainstay in the A2, Livorno would have four unsuccessful participation in the promotion playoffs, with its fifth attempt in 2001 finally successful.

Basket Livorno would join the first division Serie A for a historic first time during the 2001-02 season, finishing next to last, enough to confirm their top division status. Mabo would leave the ownership of the team – for a symbolic euro – to the commune in 2004. The latter would try and reduce their share by incorporating corporate ownership, though they resisted selling the license to another city, the TD group became a mayor sponsor in 2007.

On the pitch Basket Livorno had cemented their place in Serie A, despite always finishing in the lower part of the league table, however during the 2006-07 season they finished last and were relegated to Legadue (the renamed second division). After two further years in Legadue, Basket Livorno decided to withdraw from their participation in the next edition during the summer of 2009, amidst reported debts of €2,000,000.

It later emerged during a 2015 investigation that the management had been using two company accounts, official and unofficial, processing undeclared financial transfers to defraud creditors, the 2014 bankruptcy of Basket Livorno was reconfirmed at the same time.

=== Pallacanestro Don Bosco ===
In parallel to the turmoil at Basket Livorno, Pallacanestro Don Bosco had continued to participate in youth championships. With its former parent club's days numbered, the club asked for admission to the fourth tier Divisione Nazionale B in 2011 as a separate entity. Its request was accepted and since then team has assured the continuation of the Don Bosco name in national leagues. It is the Livorno side playing at the highest competitive level. In May 2015 it lost in the promotion playoffs to Mens Sana Siena.

== Arena ==
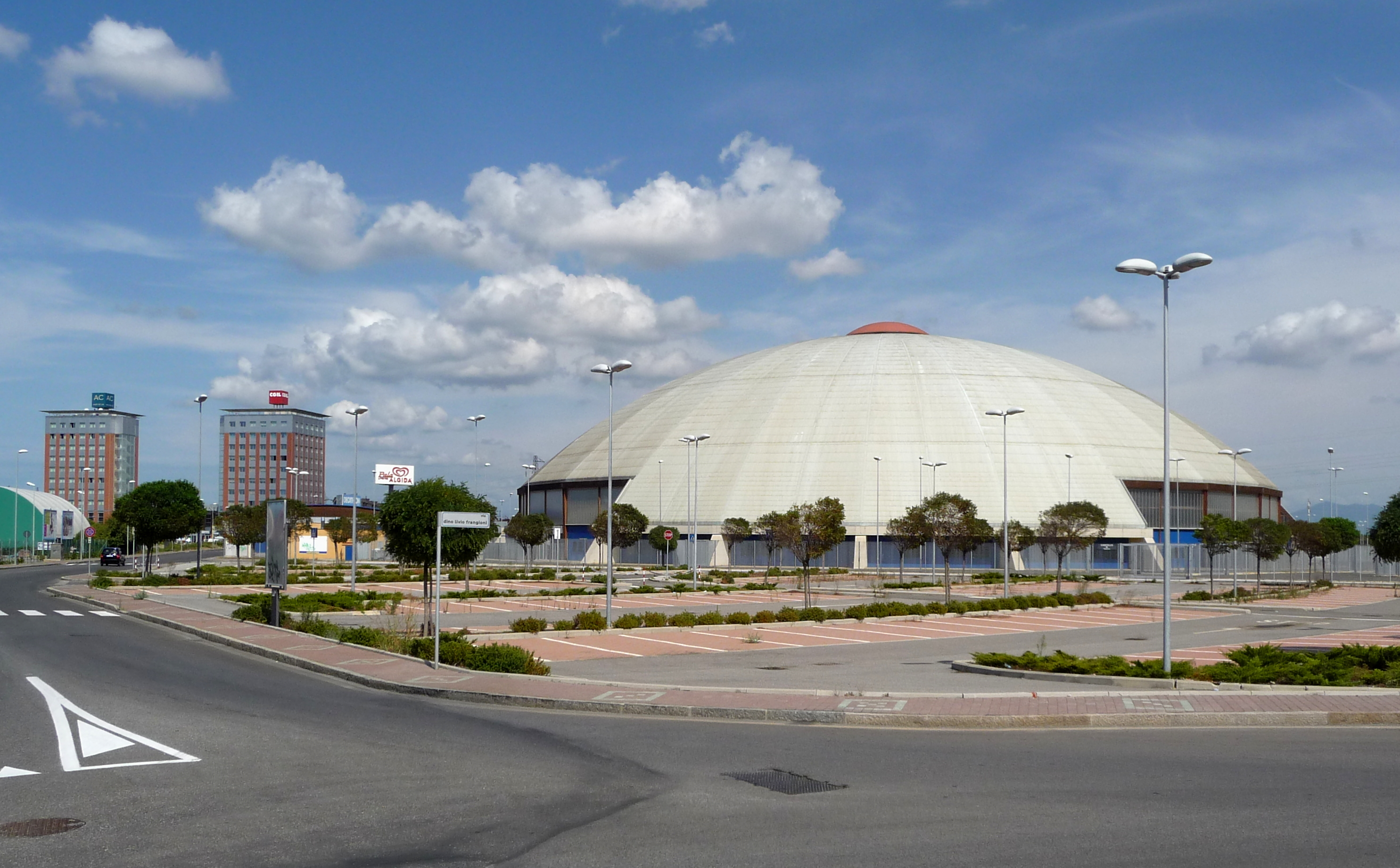
PalaLivorno.

Basket Livorno historically played before at the PalaMacchia (capacity: 2,500) and after, in 2005's season at PalaLivorno (capacity: 8,033), Pallacanestro Don Bosco plays only at PalaMacchia (in Italian) (capacity: 2,500).

== Sponsorship names ==
Pallacanestro Don Bosco Livorno
- CFG Livorno (2014–present)
Basket Livorno
- Bini Viaggi Livorno (1996-1999)
- Mabo Prefabbricati Livorno (2000-2004)
- Villaggio Solidago Livorno (2004-2005)
- TDShop.it Livorno (2005-2007)

== Notable players ==
2000's

- (United States) Brandon Hunter 1 season: '06-'07
- (Nigeria) Aloysius Anagonye 1 season: '04-'05
- (United States) Drew Nicholas 1 season: '04-'05
- (United States) Preston Shumpert 1 season: '04-'05
- (United States) Charlie Bell 1 season: '03-'04
- (Italy) Tommaso Fantoni 5 seasons: '02-'07
- (Argentina) Antonio Porta 4 seasons: '02-'06
- (Italy) Luca Garri 4 seasons: '00-'04
- (United States) Ken Barlow 2 seasons: '00-'02
- (United States) Tyrone Grant 2 seasons: '00-'02
- (United States) Miles Simon 1 season: '00-'01

1990's

- (United States) Myron Brown 1 season: '99-'00
- (United States) Tellis Frank 1 season: '99-'00
- (Croatia) Ivica Marić 1 season: '98-'99
- (United States) Brad Miller 1 season: '98-'99
- (Italy) Walter Santarossa 7 seasons: '96-'03
- (Italy) Samuele Podestà 4 seasons: '96-'00
- (Italy) Mario Gigena 3 seasons: '96-'99
- (Argentina) Silvio Gigena 3 seasons: '96-'99
- (Italy) Dante Calabria 1 season: '96-'97
- (Italy) Alessandro Fantozzi 1 season: '96-'97
- (United States) John Turner 1 season: '96-'97
