= 2019–20 Fortitudo Bologna season =

Fortitudo Pallacanestro Bologna
2019-20 season
- President: Christian Pavani
- Head coach: Antimo Martino
- Arena: PalaDozza
- LBA: season cancelled (8th)
- Coppa Italia: Semifinals

The 2019–20 season is Fortitudo Bologna's 88th in existence (6th after the re-foundation) and the new club's 1st season in the Lega Basket Serie A after the promotion in the top flight of Italian basketball.

== Overview ==
Fortitudo Bologna returned to Italy’s top basketball division for the 2019–20 season after a ten-year absence.

After the demotion to the Legadue and immediately to the Serie A dilettanti in 2009, the team saw the bankruptcy in 2012. In 2013 the, Bologna, was re-established under the name of Fortitudo Pallacanestro Bologna 103 and slowly moved its way up to the today's Serie A after 10 years.

The promotion was achieved by winning the 2018–19 Serie A2 Basket.

The 2019-20 season was hit by the coronavirus pandemic that compelled the federation to suspend and later cancel the competition without assigning the title of winner to anyone. Fortitudo Bologna ended the championship in 8th position.

== Kit ==
Sponsor: Pompea

Home	Away

== Players ==
The team composition is the same as the last game played on February 9 before the interruption of the championship due to the coronavirus pandemic. Kassius Robertson was released before the official interruption of the season due to an injury procured during the FIBA AmeriCup qualification window with the Canadian national team. Jerome Dyson was hired from Virtus Roma to replace Kassius Robertson, but he never played any games.

=== Current roster ===
Pompea Fortitudo Bologna roster
Players
Coaches

Pos.	No.	Nat.	Name	Ht.	Wt.	Age
SG	3	(Canada)	Robertson, Kassius (*)	1.91 m (6 ft 3 in)	82 kg (181 lb)	32 – 20 April 1994
G/F	4	(Italy)	Aradori, Pietro	1.96 m (6 ft 5 in)	100 kg (220 lb)	37 – 9 October 1988
SG	5	(Italy)	Cinciarini, Daniele	1.93 m (6 ft 4 in)	89 kg (196 lb)	43 – 14 June 1983
PF	6	(Italy)	Mancinelli, Stefano (C)	2.03 m (6 ft 8 in)	105 kg (231 lb)	43 – 17 March 1983
F	9	(Italy)	Dellosto, Nicolò	2.01 m (6 ft 7 in)	100 kg (220 lb)	26 – 6 April 2000
F/C	10	(United States)	Leunen, Maarty	2.06 m (6 ft 9 in)	98 kg (216 lb)	41 – 3 September 1985
G	11	(United States)	Dyson, Jerome (**)	1.91 m (6 ft 3 in)	82 kg (181 lb)	39 – 1 May 1987
F/C	14	(United States)	Sims, Henry	2.08 m (6 ft 10 in)	112 kg (247 lb)	36 – 27 March 1990
PG	21	(Italy)	Fantinelli, Matteo	1.95 m (6 ft 5 in)	86 kg (190 lb)	32 – 24 November 1993
F/C	22	(United States)	Daniel, Ed	2.02 m (6 ft 8 in)	102 kg (225 lb)	36 – 13 June 1990
PG	24	(Croatia)	Stipčević, Rok	1.85 m (6 ft 1 in)	85 kg (187 lb)	40 – 10 May 1986

Head coach

- (Italy) Antimo Martino

Assistant coach(es)

- (Italy) Stefano Comuzzo
- (Italy) Alessandro Lotesoriere

Legend

- (C) Team captain
- (*) Left the team after the last match
- (**) Joined the team before the
  interruption and never played
- Injured

- Roster
Updated: February 26, 2020

Note: Flags indicate national team eligibility at FIBA-sanctioned events. Players may hold other non-FIBA nationalities not displayed.

=== Depth chart ===
Pos.	Starting 5	Bench
C	Henry Sims	Ed Daniel
PF	Maarty Leunen	Stefano Mancinelli
SF	Pietro Aradori	Nicolò Dellosto
SG	Jerome Dyson	Daniele Cinciarini
PG	Matteo Fantinelli	Rok Stipčević

5+5 format (colours: Italian or homegrown players; foreign players; young players)

=== Squad changes ===
==== In ====
No.	Pos.	Nat.	Name	Age	Moving from		Type	Ends	Transfer fee	Date	Source
24	PG	(Croatia)	Rok Stipčević	33	Rytas Vilnius	(Lithuania)	1 year	June 2020	Free	10 June 2019	
22	F/C	(United States)	Ed Daniel	29	Peristeri	(Greece)	1 year	June 2020	Free	4 July 2019	
3	G/F	(Canada)	Kassius Robertson	25	Medi Bayreuth	(Germany)	1 year	June 2020	Free	16 July 2019	
14	C	(United States)	Henry Sims	29	Virtus Roma	(Italy)	1 year	June 2020	Free	6 August 2019	
9	F	(Italy)	Nicolò Dellosto	19	Reggio Emilia	(Italy)	N/A	N/A	Youth system	6 August 2019	
4	G/F	(Italy)	Pietro Aradori	30	Virtus Bologna	(Italy)	4 years	June 2023	Free	12 August 2019	
23	F	(United States)	Deshawn Stephens	29	Hapoel Tel Aviv	(Israel)	2 months	November 2019	Free	18 September 2019	
11	G	(United States)	Jerome Dyson	32	Virtus Roma	(Italy)	end of the season	June 2020	Undisclosed	26 February 2020	

==== Out ====
No.	Pos.	Nat.	Name	Age	Moving to		Type	Transfer fee	Date	Source
0	SF	(Argentina) (Italy)	Carlos Delfino	36	free agent		end of contract	Free	1 July 2019	
4	G/F	(Italy)	Giacomo Sgorbati	21	Aurora Basket Jesi	(Italy)	end of contract	Free	1 July 2019	
8	C	(Italy)	Matteo Franco	36	retired		end of contract	Free	1 July 2019	
9	SF	(Italy)	Andrea Benevelli	33	Urania Milano	(Italy)	end of contract	Free	1 July 2019	
16	PG	(Italy)	Marco Venuto	33	Ravenna	(Italy)	end of contract	Free	1 July 2019	
20	SG	(Italy)	Guido Rosselli	36	Scaligera Verona	(Italy)	end of contract	Free	1 July 2019	
22	PG	(Italy)	Giovanni Pini	26	Virtus Roma	(Italy)	end of contract	Free	1 July 2019	
41	G	(United States)	Kenny Hasbrouck	32	Scaligera Verona	(Italy)	end of contract	Free	1 July 2019	
23	F	(United States)	Deshawn Stephens	30	Scafati Basket	(Italy)	end of contract	Free	31 October 2019	
3	G/F	(Canada)	Kassius Robertson	25	free agent		mutual consent	Free	3 March 2020	

==== Confirmed ====
No.	Pos.	Nat.	Name	Age	Moving from		Type	Ends	Transfer fee	Date	Source
6	PF	(Italy)	Stefano Mancinelli	43	Auxilium Torino	(Italy)	4 years	June 2021	Free	6 July 2016	
5	SG	(Italy)	Daniele Cinciarini	43	JuveCaserta	(Italy)	2 + 1 years	June 2020	40,000€	25 April 2017	
21	PG	(Italy)	Matteo Fantinelli	32	Universo Treviso Basket	(Italy)	1 + 2	June 2021	Free	20 June 2018	
10	F/C	(United States)	Maarty Leunen	41	Scandone Avellino	(Italy)	1 + 2	June 2021	Free	30 July 2018	

==== Coach ====
Nat.	Name	Age.	Last team		Type	Ends	Date	Source
(Italy)	Antimo Martino	41	Basket Ravenna	(Italy)	2	2020	12 June 2018	

== Competitions ==
=== Serie A ===
Pos	Team	Pld	W	L	PF	PA	PD	Qualification or relegation
6	Vanoli Cremona	20	12	8	1627	1617	+10	
7	Umana Reyer Venezia	21	11	10	1638	1582	+56	Qualification for EuroCup
8	Pompea Fortitudo Bologna	21	11	10	1624	1670	−46	Qualification for Champions League
9	Dolomiti Energia Trento	21	11	10	1635	1665	−30	Qualification for EuroCup
10	Openjobmetis Varese	19	9	10	1570	1522	+48	

Updated to match(es) played on 9 February 2020. Source: LBA

=== Italian Cup ===
Bologna qualified to the 2020 Italian Basketball Cup having ended the first half of the season in 6th place. They lost the semifinal against New Basket Brindisi.

14 February 2020 Quarter finals	Germani Basket Brescia	73–76	Pompea Fortitudo Bologna	Pesaro
20:45	Scoring by quarter: 17–17, 17–16, 22–20, 17–23
Eurosport, Rai Sport	Pts: Lansdowne 15; Rebs: Moss, Horton 7 Asts: Vitali 4 PIR: Moss 11	Boxscore	Pts: Sims 17; Rebs: Sims 8 Asts: three players 2 PIR: Aradori 20	Arena: Adriatic Arena; Referees: Roberto Begnis, Carmelo Lo Guzzo, Denny Borgioni

15 February 2020	Happy Casa Brindisi	78–53	Pompea Fortitudo Bologna	Pesaro
20:45	Scoring by quarter: 23–12, 22–12, 19–13, 14–16
Eurosport, Rai Sport	Pts: Brown 18; Rebs: Banks 7 Asts: Thompson 7 PIR: Brown 26	Boxscore	Pts: Cinciarini, Sims 10; Rebs: Daniel, Sims 9 Asts: Sims 2 PIR: Sims 11	Arena: Adriatic Arena; Referees: Roberto Begnis, Beniamino Manuel Attard, Denny Borgioni
