= 2020 Italian Basketball Cup =

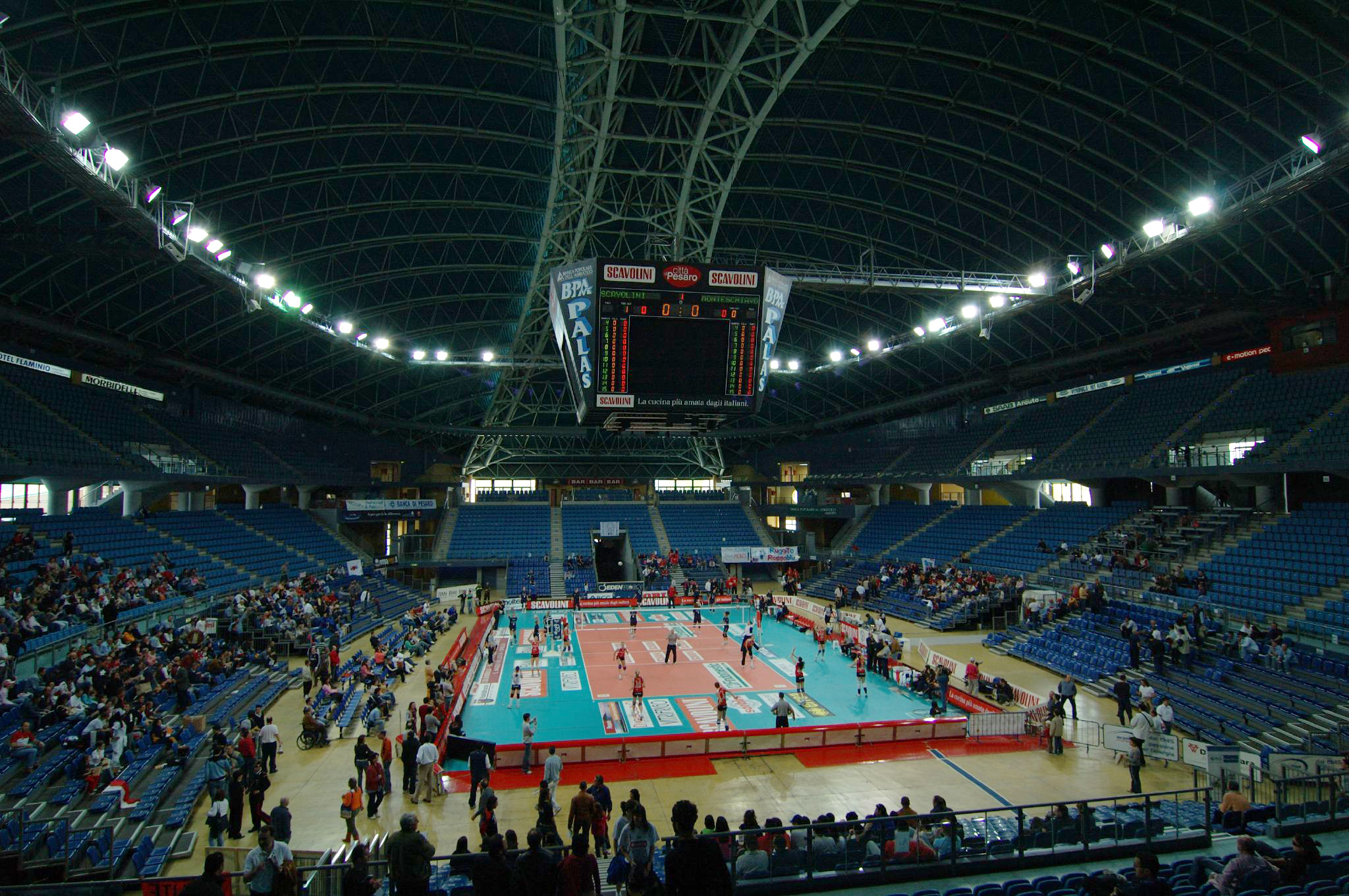
- The Adriatic Arena hosted the 2020 Cup

Tournament details
- Country: Italy
- City: Pesaro
- Venue: Adriatic Arena
- Dates: 13–16 February 2020
- Teams: 8
- Defending champions: Vanoli Cremona

Final positions
- Champions: Umana Reyer Venezia (1st title)
- Runners-up: Happy Casa Brindisi
- Semifinalists: AX Armani Exchange Milano; Pompea Fortitudo Bologna

Awards
- MVP: (United States) Austin Daye (Venezia)
- All statistics correct as of complete.

The 2020 Italian Basketball Cup, known as the 2020 Zurich Connect Final Eight for sponsorship reasons, was the 44th edition of Italy's national cup tournament. The competition is managed by the Lega Basket for LBA clubs. The tournament was played from 13 to 16 February 2020 in Pesaro, at the end of the first half of the 2019–20 LBA season.

Vanoli Cremona were the defending champions.

Umana Reyer Venezia went to win its first Cup ever by beating Happy Casa Brindisi 73–67 in the Finals. Austin Daye was named Panasonic MVP of the competition.

All times are in Central European Time (UTC+01:00).

== Qualification ==
Qualified for the tournament are selected based on their position on the league table at the end of the first half of the 2019–20 LBA regular season.

Pos	Team	Pld	W	L	PF	PA	PD	Qualification
1	Segafredo Virtus Bologna	16	14	2	1343	1212	+131	Qualified as seeded teams
2	Banco di Sardegna Sassari	16	13	3	1334	1164	+170	Qualified as seeded teams
3	Germani Basket Brescia	16	11	5	1328	1178	+150	Qualified as seeded teams
4	AX Armani Exchange Milano	16	10	6	1285	1195	+90	Qualified as seeded teams
5	Vanoli Cremona	16	9	7	1261	1271	−10	Qualified as non-seeded teams
6	Pompea Fortitudo Bologna	16	9	7	1237	1264	−27	Qualified as non-seeded teams
7	Happy Casa Brindisi	16	9	7	1332	1287	+45	Qualified as non-seeded teams
8	Umana Reyer Venezia	16	8	8	1250	1203	+47	Qualified as non-seeded teams

Source: LBA

== Bracket ==
Quarterfinals; 13–14 February
1	Segafredo Virtus Bologna	81
8	Umana Reyer Venezia	82
4	AX Armani Exchange Milano	86
5	Vanoli Cremona	62
2	Banco di Sardegna Sassari	86
7	Happy Casa Brindisi	91
3	Germani Basket Brescia	73
6	Pompea Fortitudo Bologna	76

Semifinals; 15 February
8	Umana Reyer Venezia	67
4	AX Armani Exchange Milano	63
7	Happy Casa Brindisi	78
6	Pompea Fortitudo Bologna	53

Final; 16 February
8	Umana Reyer Venezia	73
6	Happy Casa Brindisi	67

== Quarterfinals ==
=== AX Armani Exchange Milano vs. Vanoli Cremona ===
13 February 2020	AX Armani Exchange Milano	86–62	Vanoli Cremona	Pesaro
18:00	Scoring by quarter: 28–12, 16–19, 16–20, 26–11
Eurosport, Rai Sport	Pts: Tarczewski 14; Rebs: Tarczewski 9 Asts: Rodríguez 8 PIR: Tarczewski 23	Boxscore	Pts: Mathews 16; Rebs: Happ 10; Asts: Diener 4 PIR: Happ 24	Arena: Adriatic Arena; Referees: Michele Rossi, Massimiliano Filippini, Andrea Bongiorni

Starters:			Pts	Reb	Ast
PG	13	(Spain) Sergio Rodríguez	9	5	8
SG	20	(Italy) Andrea Cinciarini	9	7	3
SF	5	(Serbia) Vladimir Micov	13	2	2
PF	40	(Argentina) Luis Scola	9	3	0
C	15	(United States) Kaleb Tarczewski	14	9	1
Reserves:					
SG	00	(Italy) Amedeo Della Valle	13	1	0
C	6	(Italy) Paul Biligha	1	1	0
SG	9	(Italy) Riccardo Moraschini	DNP		
SG	16	(Serbia) Nemanja Nedović	10	2	2
PF	23	(Italy) Christian Burns	0	3	1
PG	28	(United States) Keifer Sykes	3	0	0
PF	32	(Italy) Jeff Brooks	2	5	1
Head coach:
(Italy) Ettore Messina

AX Armani Exchange Milano	Vanoli Cremona

Starters:			Pts	Reb	Ast
PG	10	(Italy) Michele Ruzzier	2	0	0
SG	1	(United States) Wesley Saunders	8	4	2
SF	2	(United States) Jordan Mathews	16	2	1
PF	45	(Italy) Nicola Akele	4	7	1
C	22	(United States) Ethan Happ	12	10	3
Reserves:					
SF	3	(Italy) Giacomo Zanotti	DNP		
PG	5	(Italy) Giacomo Sanguinetti	DNP		
PG	7	(Italy) Travis Diener	2	0	4
C	13	(Croatia) Josip Sobin	3	6	1
SF	21	(Italy) Niccolò De Vico	8	0	0
PF	23	(Serbia) Vojislav Stojanović	4	7	1
SG	31	(Finland) Topias Palmi	3	3	1
Head coach:
(Italy) Romeo Sacchetti

=== Segafredo Virtus Bologna vs. Umana Reyer Venezia ===
13 February 2020	Segafredo Virtus Bologna	81–82(OT)	Umana Reyer Venezia	Pesaro
20:45	Scoring by quarter: 11-21, 21-16, 15-13, 21-18, Overtime: 13-14
Eurosport, Rai Sport	Pts: Marković 18; Rebs: Hunter 10; Asts: Teodosić 6 PIR: Weems 20	Boxscore	Pts: Tonut 16; Rebs: Vidmar 11; Asts: De Nicolao 3 PIR: Vidmar 17	Arena: Adriatic Arena; Referees: Carmelo Paternico', Beniamino Manuel Attard, Fabrizio Paglialunga

Starters:			Pts	Reb	Ast
PG	9	(Serbia) Stefan Marković	18	2	3
SG	44	(Serbia) Miloš Teodosić	15	4	6
SF	34	(United States) Kyle Weems	15	7	4
PF	11	(Italy) Giampaolo Ricci	12	5	3
C	45	(United States) Julian Gamble	10	6	1
Reserves:					
PG	1	(Italy) Lorenzo Deri	DNP		
SF	2	(United States) Devyn Marble	1	2	0
PG	6	(Italy) Alessandro Pajola	2	0	1
PF	8	(Italy) Filippo Baldi Rossi	2	1	0
SG	25	(Italy) David Cournooh	0	0	0
C	32	(United States) Vince Hunter	6	10	1
SF	35	(Serbia) Stefan Nikolić	DNP		
Head coach:
(Serbia) Aleksandar Đorđević

Segafredo Virtus Bologna	Umana Reyer Venezia

Starters:			Pts	Reb	Ast
PG	10	(Italy) Andrea De Nicolao	11	2	3
SG	7	(Italy) Stefano Tonut	16	2	2
SF	21	(United States) Jeremy Chappell	14	7	2
PF	22	(Italy) Valerio Mazzola	3	1	0
C	50	(United States) Mitchell Watt	4	7	1
Reserves:					
PG	3	(Italy) Davide Casarin	DNP		
SF	5	(United States) Julyan Stone	3	9	1
SF	6	(Greece) Michael Bramos	9	5	0
PF	9	(United States) Austin Daye	15	4	2
PG	12	(Italy) Ariel Filloy	0	0	0
C	14	(Slovenia) Gašper Vidmar	7	11	1
SF	30	(Argentina) Bruno Cerella	0	0	0
Head coach:
(Italy) Walter De Raffaele

=== Banco di Sardegna Sassari vs. Happy Casa Brindisi ===
14 February 2020	Banco di Sardegna Sassari	86–91	Happy Casa Brindisi	Pesaro
18:00	Scoring by quarter: 22–26, 16–13, 23–25, 25–27
Eurosport, Rai Sport	Pts: Pierre 21; Rebs: Pierre 9 Asts: Evans 5 PIR: Pierre 31	Boxscore	Pts: Banks 37; Rebs: Banks 8 Asts: John Brown 4 PIR: Banks 41	Arena: Adriatic Arena; Referees: Saverio Lanzarini, Alessandro Vicino, Mark Bartoli

Starters:			Pts	Reb	Ast
PG	0	(Italy) Marco Spissu	15	4	4
SG	31	(Italy) Michele Vitali	2	3	0
SF	21	(Canada) Dyshawn Pierre	21	9	4
PF	11	(United States) Dwayne Evans	12	6	5
C	2	(Croatia) Miro Bilan	8	5	1
Reserves:					
SF	7	(Italy) Lorenzo Bucarelli	1	0	1
SF	8	(Italy) Giacomo Devecchi	DNP		
C	15	(Italy) Daniele Magro	DNP		
SG	22	(Italy) Stefano Gentile	6	5	1
C	23	(The Bahamas) Dwight Coleby	2	3	1
PG	55	(United States) Curtis Jerrells	20	2	2
Head coach:
(Italy) Gianmarco Pozzecco

Banco di Sardegna Sassari	Happy Casa Brindisi

Starters:			Pts	Reb	Ast
PG	15	(United States) Darius Thompson	10	1	2
SG	0	(United States) Adrian Banks	37	8	3
SF	1	(United States) Kelvin Martin	14	6	0
PF	33	(United States) Tyler Stone	9	4	1
C	00	(United States) John Brown	2	4	4
Reserves:					
SF	2	(United States) Dominique Sutton	10	5	1
PG	6	(Italy) Alessandro Zanelli	3	4	2
G	8	(Italy) Alessandro Guido	DNP		
PF	10	(Italy) Raphael Gaspardo	6	4	2
SG	12	(Italy) Luca Campogrande	0	1	1
C	18	(Italy) Riccardo Cattapan	DNP		
SF	35	(Italy) Iris Ikangi	DNP		
Head coach:
(Italy) Francesco Vitucci

=== Germani Basket Brescia vs. Pompea Fortitudo Bologna ===
14 February 2020	Germani Basket Brescia	73–76	Pompea Fortitudo Bologna	Pesaro
20:45	Scoring by quarter: 17–17, 17–16, 22–20, 17–23
Eurosport, Rai Sport	Pts: Lansdowne 15; Rebs: Moss, Horton 7 Asts: Vitali 4 PIR: Moss 11	Boxscore	Pts: Sims 17; Rebs: Sims 8 Asts: three players 2 PIR: Aradori 20	Arena: Adriatic Arena; Referees: Roberto Begnis, Carmelo Lo Guzzo, Denny Borgioni

Starters:			Pts	Reb	Ast
PG	7	(Italy) Luca Vitali	14	1	4
SG	34	(United States) David Moss	7	7	1
SF	5	(Italy) Awudu Abass	10	2	1
PF	30	(United States) Ken Horton	6	7	1
C	6	(United States) Tyler Cain	4	5	2
Reserves:					
C	0	(Italy) Andrea Zerini	3	4	1
PG	2	(United States) Travis Trice	0	0	0
PG	8	(Italy) Tommaso Laquintana	6	0	0
SG	9	(United States) DeAndre Lansdowne	15	1	0
C	18	(Italy) Tommaso Guariglia	DNP		
PF	41	(Italy) Brian Sacchetti	8	3	2
Head coach:
(Italy) Vincenzo Esposito

Germani Basket Brescia	Pompea Fortitudo Bologna

Starters:			Pts	Reb	Ast
PG	21	(Italy) Matteo Fantinelli	11	2	2
SG	3	(Canada) Kassius Robertson	2	2	2
SF	4	(Italy) Pietro Aradori	16	5	2
PF	10	(United States) Maarty Leunen	7	5	1
C	14	(United States) Henry Sims	17	8	0
Reserves:					
SG	5	(Italy) Daniele Cinciarini	14	3	1
PF	6	(Italy) Stefano Mancinelli	9	3	1
SF	9	(Italy) Nicolò Dellosto	DNP		
C	22	(United States) Ed Daniel	0	0	1
PG	24	(Croatia) Rok Stipčević	0	1	0
Head coach:
(Italy) Antimo Martino

== Semifinals ==
=== AX Armani Exchange Milano vs. Umana Reyer Venezia ===
15 February 2020	AX Armani Exchange Milano	63–67	Umana Reyer Venezia	Pesaro
18:00	Scoring by quarter: 22–15, 9–14, 13–25, 19–13
Eurosport, Rai Sport	Pts: Rodríguez 15; Rebs: Scola, Tarczewski 9 Asts: Rodríguez 3 PIR: Scola 19	Boxscore	Pts: Watt 16; Rebs: Watt 10; Asts: three players 3 PIR: Watt 15	Arena: Adriatic Arena; Referees: Tolga Sahin, Manuel Mazzoni, Guido Giovannetti

Starters:			Pts	Reb	Ast
PG	13	(Spain) Sergio Rodríguez	15	2	3
SG	20	(Italy) Andrea Cinciarini	3	1	2
SF	5	(Serbia) Vladimir Micov	9	3	1
PF	40	(Argentina) Luis Scola	14	9	0
C	15	(United States) Kaleb Tarczewski	9	9	1
Reserves:					
SG	00	(Italy) Amedeo Della Valle	0	0	1
C	6	(Italy) Paul Biligha	3	1	0
SF	9	(Italy) Riccardo Moraschini	DNP		
SG	10	(Tunisia) Michael Roll	1	1	0
SG	16	(Serbia) Nemanja Nedović	8	8	0
PF	23	(Italy) Christian Burns	DNP		
PF	32	(Italy) Jeff Brooks	1	7	0
Head coach:
(Italy) Ettore Messina

AX Armani Exchange Milano	Umana Reyer Venezia

Starters:			Pts	Reb	Ast
PG	10	(Italy) Andrea De Nicolao	12	3	3
SG	7	(Italy) Stefano Tonut	6	2	1
SF	21	(United States) Jeremy Chappell	4	3	3
PF	22	(Italy) Valerio Mazzola	3	2	0
C	50	(United States) Mitchell Watt	16	10	1
Reserves:					
PG	3	(Italy) Davide Casarin	DNP		
SF	5	(United States) Julyan Stone	0	7	2
SF	6	(Greece) Michael Bramos	10	4	1
PF	9	(United States) Austin Daye	13	1	3
PG	12	(Italy) Ariel Filloy	3	1	0
C	14	(Slovenia) Gašper Vidmar	0	3	0
SF	30	(Argentina) Bruno Cerella	0	1	0
Head coach:
(Italy) Walter De Raffaele

=== Happy Casa Brindisi vs. Pompea Fortitudo Bologna ===
15 February 2020	Happy Casa Brindisi	78–53	Pompea Fortitudo Bologna	Pesaro
20:45	Scoring by quarter: 23–12, 22–12, 19–13, 14–16
Eurosport, Rai Sport	Pts: Brown 18; Rebs: Banks 7 Asts: Thompson 7 PIR: Brown 26	Boxscore	Pts: Cinciarini, Sims 10; Rebs: Daniel, Sims 9 Asts: Sims 2 PIR: Sims 11	Arena: Adriatic Arena; Referees: Roberto Begnis, Beniamino Manuel Attard, Denny Borgioni

Starters:			Pts	Reb	Ast
PG	15	(United States) Darius Thompson	10	4	7
SG	0	(United States) Adrian Banks	11	7	2
SF	1	(United States) Kelvin Martin	8	4	2
PF	33	(United States) Tyler Stone	6	3	0
C	00	(United States) John Brown	18	6	3
Reserves:					
SF	2	(United States) Dominique Sutton	6	1	0
PG	6	(Italy) Alessandro Zanelli	7	1	2
G	8	(Italy) Alessandro Guido	0	0	0
PF	10	(Italy) Raphael Gaspardo	9	6	1
SG	12	(Italy) Luca Campogrande	3	4	0
C	18	(Italy) Riccardo Cattapan	0	0	0
SF	35	(Italy) Iris Ikangi	0	0	0
Head coach:
(Italy) Francesco Vitucci

Happy Casa Brindisi	Pompea Fortitudo Bologna

Starters:			Pts	Reb	Ast
PG	21	(Italy) Matteo Fantinelli	6	4	1
SG	3	(Canada) Kassius Robertson	4	1	0
SF	4	(Italy) Pietro Aradori	4	7	1
PF	10	(United States) Maarty Leunen	4	5	1
C	14	(United States) Henry Sims	10	9	2
Reserves:					
SG	5	(Italy) Daniele Cinciarini	10	2	1
PF	6	(Italy) Stefano Mancinelli	4	2	1
SF	9	(Italy) Nicolò Dellosto	0	5	1
C	22	(United States) Ed Daniel	7	9	0
PG	24	(Croatia) Rok Stipčević	4	4	1
Head coach:
(Italy) Antimo Martino

== Final ==
=== Umana Reyer Venezia vs. Happy Casa Brindisi ===
16 February 2020	Umana Reyer Venezia	73–67	Happy Casa Brindisi	Pesaro
18:00	Scoring by quarter: 18–8, 16–22, 16–13, 23–24
Eurosport, Rai Sport	Pts: Watt 17; Rebs: Watt 10; Asts: Tonut 4 PIR: Watt 19	Boxscore	Pts: Banks 27; Rebs: Brown 12; Asts: Thompson 4 PIR: Banks 26	Arena: Adriatic Arena; Referees: Carmelo Paternico', Saverio Lanzarini, Manuel Mazzoni

Starters:			Pts	Reb	Ast
PG	10	(Italy) Andrea De Nicolao	5	4	1
SG	7	(Italy) Stefano Tonut	13	1	4
SF	21	(United States) Jeremy Chappell	7	8	0
PF	22	(Italy) Valerio Mazzola	6	4	1
C	50	(United States) Mitchell Watt	17	10	2
Reserves:					
PG	3	(Italy) Davide Casarin	DNP		
SF	5	(United States) Julyan Stone	0	3	3
SF	6	(Greece) Michael Bramos	12	4	1
PF	9	(United States) Austin Daye	13	2	2
PG	12	(Italy) Ariel Filloy	0	1	1
C	14	(Slovenia) Gašper Vidmar	0	0	0
SF	30	(Argentina) Bruno Cerella	0	1	0
Head coach:
(Italy) Walter De Raffaele

Umana Reyer Venezia	Happy Casa Brindisi

Venezia	Statistics	Brindisi
14/41 (34.1%)	2 point field goals	9/27 (33.3%)
11/32 (34.4%)	3 point field goals	9/32 (28.1%)
12/14 (85.7%)	Free throws	22/32 (68.8%)
45	Rebounds	55
15	Assists	11
9	Steals	2
9	Turnovers	15
1	Blocks	2

Starters:			Pts	Reb	Ast
PG	15	(United States) Darius Thompson	6	3	4
SG	0	(United States) Adrian Banks	27	6	1
SF	1	(United States) Kelvin Martin	5	9	1
PF	33	(United States) Tyler Stone	0	9	1
C	00	(United States) John Brown	3	12	2
Reserves:					
SF	2	(United States) Dominique Sutton	5	2	0
PG	6	(Italy) Alessandro Zanelli	7	1	2
G	8	(Italy) Alessandro Guido	DNP		
PF	10	(Italy) Raphael Gaspardo	8	2	0
SG	12	(Italy) Luca Campogrande	6	1	0
C	18	(Italy) Riccardo Cattapan	DNP		
SF	35	(Italy) Iris Ikangi	DNP		
Head coach:
(Italy) Francesco Vitucci

2020 Italian Cup champions
Umana Reyer Venezia
1st title

== Sponsors ==
- Zurich (title sponsor)
- Panasonic (main sponsor)
- Fastweb (technology partner)
- SNAIPay (platinum sponsor)
- StarCasinò (platinum sponsor)
- IBSA (gold sponsor)
- Prosciutto Carpegna (gold sponsor)
- Molten (official ball)
- Prozis (official nutrition)
- Airness (official store)
- Anthea (official broker)
- Erreà (technical sponsor)
- Contadi Castaldi (wine partner)
- Giorgio Tesi Group (green partner)
- Vivaticket (ticketing provider)
- Sixtus Italia (official supplier)
- Acqua S.Bernardo (official water)
- Bottega Portici (official catering)
- Eurosport (official broadcaster)
- Rai Sport (official broadcaster)
- Il Resto del Carlino (media partner)
- Regione Marche (patronage)
- WePesaro (patronage)
