= 2019–20 New Basket Brindisi season =

New Basket Brindisi
2019-20 season
- President: Fernando Marino
- Head coach: Francesco Vitucci
- Arena: PalaPentassuglia
- LBA: season cancelled (5th)
- BCL: Regular season
- Coppa Italia: Runners-up
- Supercoppa: Semifinals

The 2019–20 season is New Basket Brindisi's 28th in existence and the club's 9th consecutive season in the top flight of Italian basketball.

== Brindisi ==
The 2019-20 season was hit by the coronavirus pandemic that compelled the federation to suspend and later cancel the competition without assigning the title to anyone. Brindisi ended the championship in 5th position.

== Kit ==
Supplier: Adidas / Sponsor: Happy Casa

Home	Away

== Players ==
=== Current roster ===
Happy Casa Brindisi roster
Players
Coaches

Pos.	No.	Nat.	Name	Ht.	Wt.	Age
F	00	(United States)	Brown, John	2.03 m (6 ft 8 in)	98 kg (216 lb)	34 – 28 January 1992
SG	0	(United States)	Banks, Adrian (C)	1.91 m (6 ft 3 in)	88 kg (194 lb)	40 – 9 February 1986
G/F	1	(United States)	Martin, Kelvin	1.96 m (6 ft 5 in)	95 kg (209 lb)	37 – 10 September 1989
F	2	(United States)	Sutton, Dominique	1.96 m (6 ft 5 in)	96 kg (212 lb)	39 – 20 October 1986
PG	6	(Italy)	Zanelli, Alessandro	1.87 m (6 ft 2 in)	80 kg (176 lb)	34 – 7 June 1992
PF	10	(Italy)	Gaspardo, Raphael	2.07 m (6 ft 9 in)	100 kg (220 lb)	33 – 3 August 1993
G	12	(Italy)	Campogrande, Luca	1.98 m (6 ft 6 in)	90 kg (198 lb)	30 – 30 April 1996
SG	15	(United States)	Thompson, Darius	1.93 m (6 ft 4 in)	89 kg (196 lb)	31 – 4 May 1995
C	18	(Italy)	Cattapan, Riccardo	2.13 m (7 ft 0 in)	103 kg (227 lb)	29 – 5 July 1997
PF	33	(United States)	Stone, Tyler	2.03 m (6 ft 8 in)	104 kg (229 lb)	35 – 8 September 1991
F	35	(Italy)	Ikangi, Iris	2.00 m (6 ft 7 in)	88 kg (194 lb)	32 – 21 February 1994

Head coach

- (Italy) Francesco Vitucci

Assistant coach(es)

- (Italy) Alberto Morea
- (Italy) Mattia Consoli

Legend

- (C) Team captain
- Injured

- Roster
Updated: February 9, 2020

Note: Flags indicate national team eligibility at FIBA-sanctioned events. Players may hold other non-FIBA nationalities not displayed.

=== Depth chart ===
Brindisi starts the season with the 5+5 format, but in January they pay the so called "luxury tax" of 40 thousand euros, that moves the team to the 6+6 format. In this new format the team can play with one foreign player more, a total of six, in the Italian championship.

Pos.	Starting 5	Bench 1	Bench 2
C	Tyler Stone	Riccardo Cattapan
PF	John Brown	Raphael Gaspardo
SF	Kelvin Martin	Iris Ikangi	Dominique Sutton
SG	Adrian Banks	Luca Campogrande
PG	Darius Thompson	Alessandro Zanelli

6+6 format (colours: Italian or homegrown players; foreign players; young players)

=== Squad changes ===
==== In ====
No.	Pos.	Nat.	Name	Age	Moving from		Type	Ends	Transfer fee	Date	Source
1	SF	(United States)	Kelvin Martin	29	Virtus Bologna	(Italy)	1 year	June 2020	Free	22 June 2019	
35	F	(Italy)	Iris Ikangi	25	Scaligera Verona	(Italy)	2 years (opt. out 2020)	June 2021	Free	23 June 2019	
10	PF	(Italy)	Raphael Gaspardo	25	Reggio Emilia	(Italy)	1 year	June 2020	Free	29 June 2019	
7	C	(Italy)	Antonio Iannuzzi	28	Varese	(Italy)	1 year	June 2020	Free	18 July 2019	
18	C	(Italy)	Riccardo Cattapan	22	Junior Casale	(Italy)	1 year	June 2020	Free	18 July 2019	
15	SG	(United States)	Darius Thompson	24	ZZ Leiden	(Netherlands)	1 + 1 year	June 2020	Free	23 July 2019	
12	G	(Italy)	Luca Campogrande	23	Scandone Avellino	(Italy)	1 year	June 2020	Free	27 July 2019	
33	PF	(United States)	Tyler Stone	27	Piratas de Quebradillas	(Puerto Rico)	1 year	June 2020	Free	31 July 2019	
4	C	(Germany) (Serbia)	Bogdan Radosavljević	26	ratiopharm Ulm	(Germany)	2 months	November 2019	Free	19 September 2019	
2	F	(United States)	Dominique Sutton	33	Anhui Dragons	(China)	1 year	June 2020	Undisclosed	12 December 2019	

==== Out ====
No.	Pos.	Nat.	Name	Age	Moving to		Type	Transfer fee	Date	Source
1	SF	(Sweden) (United States)	Erik Rush	31	Fulgor Libertas Forlì	(Italy)	end of contract	Free	1 July 2019	
3	PF	(United States)	Tony Gaffney	34	Ironi Nahariya	(Israel)	end of contract	Free	1 July 2019	
9	G/F	(Italy)	Riccardo Moraschini	28	Olimpia Milano	(Italy)	end of contract	Free	1 July 2019	
10	G	(United States)	Wes Clark	24	Pallacanestro Cantù	(Italy)	end of contract	Free	1 July 2019	
11	G	(United States)	Devondrick Walker	26	Chorale Roanne Basket	(France)	end of contract	Free	1 July 2019	
13	PG	(United States)	Phil Greene	26	Arka Gdynia	(Poland)	end of contract	Free	1 July 2019	
15	G	(Italy)	Nicolò Cazzolato	30	Valsesia Basket Borgosesia	(Italy)	end of contract	Free	1 July 2019	
18	C	(Poland) (Italy)	Jakub Wojciechowski	29	Legia Warszawa	(Poland)	end of contract	Free	1 July 2019	
21	SG	(United States)	Jeremy Chappell	32	Reyer Venezia	(Italy)	end of contract	Free	1 July 2019	
4	C	(Germany) (Serbia)	Bogdan Radosavljević	26	Alba Berlin	(Germany)	end of contract	Free	21 November 2019	
7	C	(Italy)	Antonio Iannuzzi	28	Napoli Basket	(Italy)	transfer	Undisclosed	16 January 2020	

==== Confirmed ====
No.	Pos.	Nat.	Name	Age	Moving from		Type	Ends	Transfer fee	Date	Source
6	PG	(Italy)	Alessandro Zanelli	27	Legnano Basket Knights	(Italy)	1 + 1 year	June 2020	Free	5 June 2018	
0	SG	(United States) (Israel)	Adrian Banks	33	Hapoel Tel Aviv	(Israel)	2 year	June 2020	Free	5 July 2018	
00	F/C	(United States)	John Brown	27	Universo Treviso Basket	(Italy)	1 + 1 year	June 2020	Free	5 July 2018	

==== Coach ====
Nat.	Name	Age.	Previous team		Type	Ends	Date	Source
(Italy)	Francesco Vitucci	56	Auxilium Torino	(Italy)	1 + 3	2022	14 December 2017	

== Competitions ==
=== SuperCup ===
Brindisi took part in the 25th edition of the Italian Basketball Supercup as the 2019 Italian Basketball Cup runner-up. They lost the competition at the semifinal against Reyer Venezia.

21 September 2019 Semifinals	Umana Reyer Venezia	78–73	New Basket Brindisi	Bari
20:45 (CEST)	Scoring by quarter: 6–19, 17–14, 31–11, 24–29
Eurosport	Pts: Daye 26; Rebs: Bramos, Watt 5 Asts: Daye 4	Boxscore	Pts: Banks 23; Rebs: Radivojević 8 Asts: Martin 3	Arena: PalaFlorio

=== Serie A ===
Pos	Team	Pld	W	L	PF	PA	PD	Qualification or relegation
3	Germani Basket Brescia	21	14	7	1707	1554	+153	Qualification for EuroCup
4	AX Armani Exchange Milano	21	14	7	1687	1555	+132	Already qualified for EuroLeague
5	Happy Casa Brindisi	21	13	8	1776	1696	+80	Qualification for Champions League
6	Vanoli Cremona	20	12	8	1627	1617	+10	
7	Umana Reyer Venezia	21	11	10	1638	1582	+56	Qualification for EuroCup

Updated to match(es) played on 9 February 2020. Source: LBA

=== Basketball Champions League ===
Pos	Team	Pld	W	L	PF	PA	PD	Pts	Qualification
1	(Spain) Casademont Zaragoza	14	10	4	1136	1094	+42	24	Advance to round of 16
2	(France) JDA Dijon	14	9	5	1159	1069	+90	23	Advance to round of 16
3	(Germany) Telekom Baskets Bonn	14	8	6	1143	1146	−3	22	Advance to round of 16
4	(Turkey) Beşiktaş Sompo Sigorta	14	7	7	1068	1079	−11	21	Advance to round of 16
5	(Hungary) Falco Szombathely	14	6	8	1115	1109	+6	20	
6	(Lithuania) Neptūnas	14	6	8	1137	1166	−29	20	
7	(Greece) PAOK	14	5	9	1143	1186	−43	19	
8	(Italy) Happy Casa Brindisi	14	5	9	1203	1255	−52	19	

Source: Basketball Champions League

=== Italian Cup ===
Brindisi qualified to the 2020 Italian Basketball Cup having ended the first half of the season in 7th place. They lost in the finals against Umana Reyer Venezia.

14 February 2020 Quarter finals	Banco di Sardegna Sassari	86–91	Happy Casa Brindisi	Pesaro
18:00	Scoring by quarter: 22–26, 16–13, 23–25, 25–27
Eurosport, Rai Sport	Pts: Pierre 21; Rebs: Pierre 9 Asts: Evans 5 PIR: Pierre 31	Boxscore	Pts: Banks 37; Rebs: Banks 8 Asts: John Brown 4 PIR: Banks 41	Arena: Adriatic Arena; Referees: Saverio Lanzarini, Alessandro Vicino, Mark Bartoli

15 February 2020	Happy Casa Brindisi	78–53	Pompea Fortitudo Bologna	Pesaro
20:45	Scoring by quarter: 23–12, 22–12, 19–13, 14–16
Eurosport, Rai Sport	Pts: Brown 18; Rebs: Banks 7 Asts: Thompson 7 PIR: Brown 26	Boxscore	Pts: Cinciarini, Sims 10; Rebs: Daniel, Sims 9 Asts: Sims 2 PIR: Sims 11	Arena: Adriatic Arena; Referees: Roberto Begnis, Beniamino Manuel Attard, Denny Borgioni

16 February 2020	Umana Reyer Venezia	73–67	Happy Casa Brindisi	Pesaro
18:00	Scoring by quarter: 18–8, 16–22, 16–13, 23–24
Eurosport, Rai Sport	Pts: Watt 17; Rebs: Watt 10; Asts: Tonut 4 PIR: Watt 19	Boxscore	Pts: Banks 27; Rebs: Brown 12; Asts: Thompson 4 PIR: Banks 26	Arena: Adriatic Arena; Referees: Carmelo Paternico', Saverio Lanzarini, Manuel Mazzoni
