= 2020–21 Fortitudo Bologna season =

Italian basketball season

Fortitudo Pallacanestro Bologna
2020-21 season
- Owner: Comitato per la Fondazione Fortitudo
- President: Christian Pavani
- Head coach: Luca Dalmonte
- Arena: PalaBigi
- LBA: 12th of 15
- BCL: Regular season (4th of 4)
- Supercup: Group stage (3rd of 4)

The 2020–21 season is Fortitudo Bologna's 89th in existence and the club's 2nd consecutive season in the top tier Italian basketball.

== Overview ==
After a successful, although incomplete, 2019-20 season as a newly promoted team, Bologna was able to raise the bar of the ambition and compete in the Basketball Champions League for the 2020-21 season.

== Kit ==
Supplier: Nike / Sponsor: Lavoropiù

Home	Away

== Players ==
=== Current roster ===
Fortitudo Lavoropiù Bologna roster
Players
Coaches

Pos.	No.	Nat.	Name	Ht.	Wt.	Age
SG	1	(Israel)	Banks, Adrian	1.91 m (6 ft 3 in)	88 kg (194 lb)	40 – 9 February 1986
G/F	4	(Italy)	Aradori, Pietro	1.96 m (6 ft 5 in)	100 kg (220 lb)	37 – 9 October 1988
SG	6	(Italy)	Mancinelli, Stefano (C)	2.03 m (6 ft 8 in)	105 kg (231 lb)	43 – 17 March 1983
SG	10	(United States)	Saunders, Wesley	1.96 m (6 ft 5 in)	88 kg (194 lb)	33 – 16 June 1993
C	16	(United States)	Hunt, Dario	2.06 m (6 ft 9 in)	104 kg (229 lb)	37 – 2 May 1989
PG	21	(Italy)	Fantinelli, Matteo	1.95 m (6 ft 5 in)	86 kg (190 lb)	32 – 24 November 1993
G/F	23	(Serbia)	Stojanović, Vojislav	1.99 m (6 ft 6 in)	98 kg (216 lb)	29 – 14 April 1997
PG	25	(Italy)	Baldasso, Tommaso	1.91 m (6 ft 3 in)	88 kg (194 lb)	28 – 29 January 1998
C	28	(Italy)	Cusin, Marco	2.11 m (6 ft 11 in)	107 kg (236 lb)	41 – 28 February 1985
F	33	(United States)	Withers, Todd	2.02 m (6 ft 8 in)	98 kg (216 lb)	30 – 6 May 1996
F/C	35	(Italy)	Totè, Leonardo	2.11 m (6 ft 11 in)	110 kg (243 lb)	29 – 8 July 1997

Head coach

- (Italy) Luca Dalmonte

Assistant coach(es)

- (Italy) Stefano Comuzzo
- (Italy) Simone Bianchi

Legend

- (C) Team captain
- Injured

- Roster
Updated: 10 May 2021

Note: Flags indicate national team eligibility at FIBA-sanctioned events. Players may hold other non-FIBA nationalities not displayed.

=== Depth chart ===
Pos.	Starting 5	Bench 1	Bench 2
C	Dario Hunt	Leonardo Totè	Marco Cusin
PF	Todd Withers	Stefano Mancinelli
SF	Pietro Aradori	Vojislav Stojanović
SG	Adrian Banks	Wesley Saunders
PG	Matteo Fantinelli	Tommaso Baldasso

5+5 format (colours: Italian or homegrown players; foreign players; young players)

=== Squad changes ===
==== In ====
No.	Pos.	Nat.	Name	Age	Moving from		Type	Ends	Transfer fee	Date	Source
35	F/C	(Italy)	Leonardo Totè	22	V.L. Pesaro	(Italy)	3 years	June 2023	Free	8 June 2020	
1	SG	(Israel) (United States)	Adrian Banks	34	New Basket Brindisi	(Italy)	2 years	June 2022	Free	11 June 2020	
43	PG	(Italy)	Gherardo Sabatini	26	Urania Milano	(Italy)	1 year	June 2021	Free	13 June 2020	
33	F	(United States)	Todd Withers	24	Grand Rapids Drive	(United States)	1 year	June 2021	Free	2 July 2020	
22	F/C	(United States)	Ethan Happ	24	Vanoli Cremona	(Italy)	1 year	June 2021	Free	10 July 2020	
12	G	(Italy)	Mattia Palumbo	19	Blu Basket 1971	(Italy)	4 years	July 2024	Free	19 July 2020	
11	G/F	(United States)	Tre'Shaun Fletcher	25	Ura Basket	(Finland)	1 year	June 2021	Free	20 July 2020	
28	C	(Italy)	Marco Cusin	35	JuveCaserta	(Italy)	1 year	June 2021	Undisclosed	30 October 2020	
10	SG	(United States)	Wesley Saunders	27	Monaco	(France)	1+1 years	June 2021 + 2022	Free	4 November 2020	
16	C	(United States)	Dario Hunt	31	Virtus Roma	(Italy)	1 year	June 2021	Free	14 December 2020	
25	PG	(Italy)	Tommaso Baldasso	22	Virtus Roma	(Italy)	1 year	June 2021	Free	28 December 2020	
23	G/F	(Serbia)	Vojislav Stojanović	24	Vanoli Cremona	(Italy)	End of the season	June 2021	Free	30 April 2021	

1. In players: Players who signed after the beginning of the season

==== Out ====
Leonardo Totè ended the season on loan to Bilbao Basket. The loan was finalized on the last match of the season and the team agreed wishing to give Totè the opportunity to build an experience in a foreign competition.

No.	Pos.	Nat.	Name	Age	Moving to		Type	Transfer fee	Date	Source
5	SG	(Italy)	Daniele Cinciarini	37	Basket Ravenna	(Italy)	End of contract	Free	1 July 2020	
11	G	(United States)	Jerome Dyson	33	Spójnia Stargard	(Poland)	End of contract	Free	1 July 2020	
14	C	(United States)	Henry Sims	30	Incheon Electroland Elephants	(South Korea)	End of contract	Free	1 July 2020	
22	F/C	(United States)	Ed Daniel	30	Iraklis	(Greece)	End of contract	Free	1 July 2020	
24	PG	(Croatia)	Rok Stipčević	34	Krka Novo Mesto	(Slovenia)	End of contract	Free	1 July 2020	
10	PF	(United States)	Maarty Leunen	34	Pallacanestro Cantù	(Italy)	Transfer	Undisclosed	15 July 2020	
9	F	(Italy)	Nicolò Dellosto	20	Kleb Ferrara	(Italy)	Mutual consent	Undisclosed	15 December 2020	
11	G/F	(United States)	Tre'Shaun Fletcher	26	Pistoia Basket	(Italy)	Mutual consent	Undisclosed	29 December 2020	
22	F/C	(United States)	Ethan Happ	24	Dinamo Sassari	(Italy)	Transfer	Undisclosed	18 January 2021	
12	G	(Italy)	Mattia Palumbo	20	Scafati Basket	(Italy)	On loan	Undisclosed	21 January 2021	
43	PG	(Italy)	Gherardo Sabatini	26	Assigeco Piacenza	(Italy)	Transfer	Undisclosed	22 February 2021	
35	C	(Italy)	Leonardo Totè	23	Bilbao Basket	(Spain)	Loan contract	Undisclosed	10 May 2021	

1. Out players: Players who left before the end of the season

==== Confirmed ====
No.	Pos.	Nat.	Name	Age	Moving from		Type	Ends	Transfer fee	Date	Source
6	PF	(Italy)	Stefano Mancinelli	37	Auxilium Torino	(Italy)	5 years	June 2021	Free	6 July 2016	
21	PG	(Italy)	Matteo Fantinelli	26	Universo Treviso Basket	(Italy)	1 + 2	June 2021	Free	20 June 2018	
9	F	(Italy)	Nicolò Dellosto	20	Reggio Emilia	(Italy)	N/A	N/A	Youth system	6 August 2019	
4	G/F	(Italy)	Pietro Aradori	31	Virtus Bologna	(Italy)	4 years	June 2023	Free	12 August 2019	

==== Coach ====
Nat.	Name	Age.	Last team		Type	Ends	Date	Replaces		Date	Type
(Italy)	Luca Dalmonte	58	Scaligera Verona	(Italy)	1 year	June 2021	7 December 2020	(Italy)	Romeo Sacchetti	6 December 2020	Sacked
(Italy)	Romeo Sacchetti	66	Vanoli Cremona	(Italy)	2 years	June 2022	27 May 2020	(Italy)	Antimo Martino	27 May 2020	Mutual consent

== Competitions ==
=== Supercup ===
Pos	Team	Pld	W	L	PF	PA	PD	Qualification
1	Segafredo Virtus Bologna	6	5	1	490	428	+62	Advance to Final Four
2	UnaHotels Reggio Emilia	6	3	3	479	477	+2	
3	Lavoropiù Fortitudo Bologna	6	3	3	506	496	+10	
4	Vanoli Cremona	6	1	5	408	482	−74	

Source: LegaBasket Serie A
Rules for classification: All points scored in extra period(s) were not counted in the standings, nor for any tie-break situation.

=== Serie A ===
Pos	Team	Pld	W	L	PF	PA	PD
10	Vanoli Cremona	28	11	17	2370	2395	−25
11	UNAHOTELS Reggio Emilia	28	10	18	2122	2261	−139
12	Fortitudo Lavoropiù Bologna	28	10	18	2179	2291	−112
13	Carpegna Prosciutto Basket Pesaro	28	10	18	2271	2364	−93
14	Openjobmetis Varese	28	10	18	2271	2433	−162

Updated to match(es) played on 10 May 2021. Source: LBA

=== Regular season ===
Pos	Team	Pld	W	L	PF	PA	PD	Pts	Qualification
1	(Germany) Brose Bamberg	6	6	0	509	429	+80	12	Advance to Playoffs
2	(Turkey) Pınar Karşıyaka	6	4	2	476	441	+35	10	Advance to Playoffs
3	(Spain) RETAbet Bilbao	6	2	4	445	451	−6	8	
4	(Italy) Fortitudo Bologna	6	0	6	383	492	−109	6	

Source: Champions League

== See also ==
- 2020–21 LBA season
- 2020–21 Basketball Champions League
- 2020 Italian Basketball Supercup
