= Luca Campogrande =

Italian basketball player (born 1996)

No. 12 – Pistoia Basket 2000
- Position: Shooting guard
- League: Serie A2

Personal information
- Born: 30 April 1996 (age 30) Rome, Italy
- Listed height: 1.98 m (6 ft 6 in)
- Listed weight: 90 kg (198 lb)

Career information
- Playing career: 2013–present

Career history
- 2013–2015: Sam Basket Roma
- 2015–2017: Fortitudo Bologna
- 2017–2018: Basket Montegranaro
- 2018–2019: Sidigas Avellino
- 2019–2020: New Basket Brindisi
- 2020: Virtus Roma
- 2020–2021: Reyer Venezia
- 2021–2025: Pallacanestro Trieste
- 2025–present: Pistoia Basket 2000

Career highlights
- LNP Supercup champion (2016)

Luca Campogrande (born 30 April 1996) is an Italian basketball player for Pistoia Basket 2000 of the Italian Serie A2. He is a 6 ft 6 in (1.98 m) shooting guard.

== Professional career ==
Luca Campogrande grew up in the youth sector of Sam Basket Roma, where he achieved the title of Italian U-19 Elite champion in 2015. The following year he went to Fortitudo Bologna, for the first time he played in Serie A2 League, where he signed a two-year deal.

On 11 July 2017 he went to Ponderosa Montegranaro.

On 6 July 2018 Campogrande signed a deal with LBA club Sidigas Avellino.

On 27 July 2019 he signed with New Basket Brindisi of the Italian Lega Basket Serie A (LBA).

On 6 August 2020 he was the first who signed for Virtus Roma for the 2020–21 season.

After Virtus Roma's withdrawal from the Serie A due to financial problems, Campogrande, like all the Roma players, was made free agent. After that he first joined Reyer Venezia for trainings and soon after, on 18 December, he was signed until the end of the season.

On 26 June 2021 Campogrande signed a 1+1 contract with Pallacanestro Trieste.

On 25 July 2023, Campogrande signed a one-year contract with Pallacanestro Trieste.

On July 17, 2025, he signed with Pistoia Basket 2000 of the Italian Serie A2.

== Honours ==
Fortitudo Bologna

- LNP Supercup (1): 2016
