= Austin Daye =

American basketball player (born 1988)

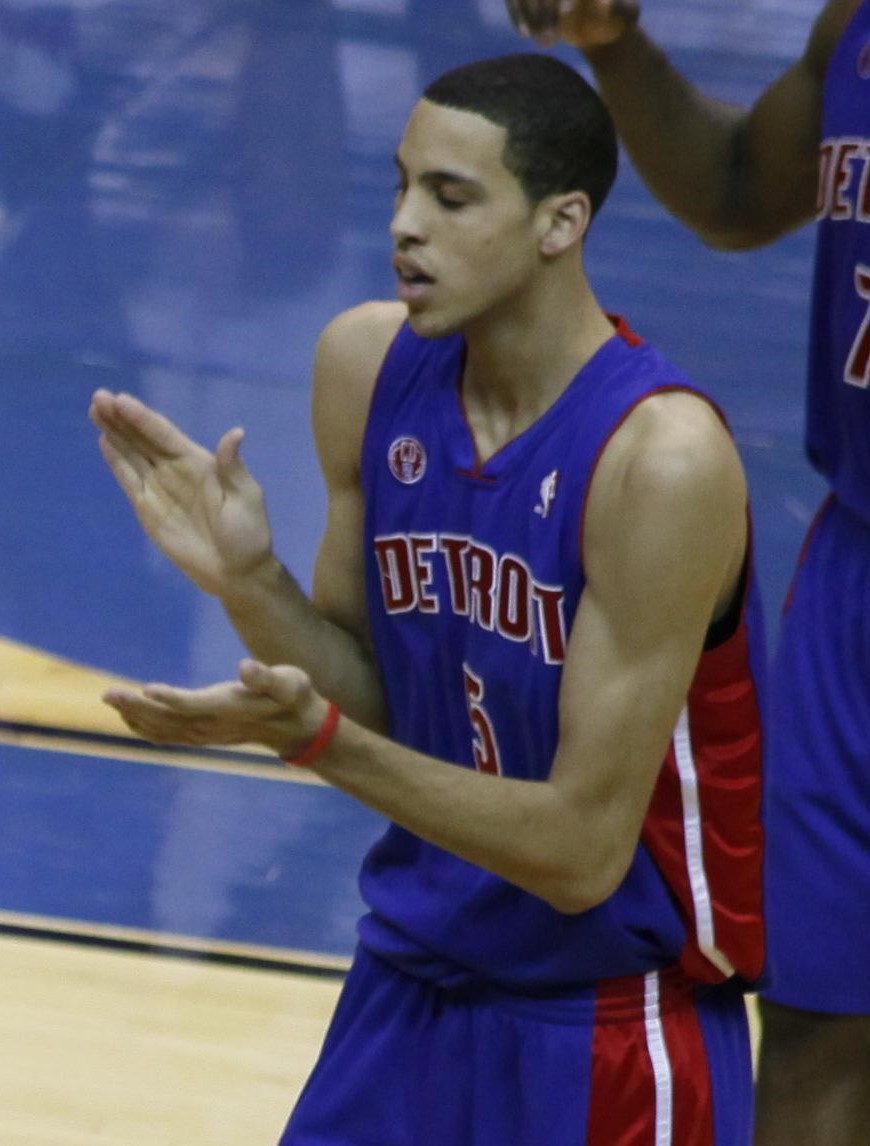
- Daye as a member of the Detroit Pistons

Personal information
- Born: June 5, 1988 (age 38) Irvine, California, U.S.
- Listed height: 2.07 m (6 ft 9 in)
- Listed weight: 91 kg (201 lb)

Career information
- High school: Woodbridge (Irvine, California)
- College: Gonzaga (2007–2009)
- NBA draft: 2009: 1st round, 15th overall pick
- Drafted by: Detroit Pistons
- Playing career: 2009–2026
- Position: Power forward
- Number: 5, 23, 3, 9, 25

Career history
- 2009–2013: Detroit Pistons
- 2011: Khimki
- 2013: Memphis Grizzlies
- 2013–2014: Toronto Raptors
- 2014–2015: San Antonio Spurs
- 2014: →Austin Toros
- 2015: Erie BayHawks
- 2015: Atlanta Hawks
- 2015–2016: Victoria Libertas Pesaro
- 2016: Manama
- 2016–2017: Galatasaray
- 2017–2018: Hapoel Jerusalem
- 2018–2022: Reyer Venezia
- 2022–2023: New Taipei Kings
- 2023: Victoria Libertas Pesaro
- 2023: Al-Muharraq
- 2024–2026: New Taipei Kings

Career highlights
- NBA champion (2014); FIBA Europe Cup champion (2018); P. League+ champion (2024); TPBL champion (2025); Italian Cup (2020); Italian Cup Finals MVP (2020); LBA champion (2019); LBA Finals MVP (2019); LBA Top Scorer (2016); BSL All-Star (2017); WCC All-Freshman team (2008)
- Stats at NBA.com
- Stats at Basketball Reference

Austin Darren Daye (born June 5, 1988) is an American former professional basketball player. He played college basketball for Gonzaga before being drafted 15th overall by the Detroit Pistons in the 2009 NBA draft. He has played for the Pistons, the Memphis Grizzlies, the Toronto Raptors, the San Antonio Spurs, and the Atlanta Hawks, while also spending time in Russia, Italy and the NBA Development League. Daye won an NBA championship with the Spurs in 2014. With Umana Reyer Venezia, Daye won the Lega Basket Serie A championship in 2019 and the Italian Basketball Cup in 2020; he was also named most valuable player of the 2019 LBA Finals and the 2020 Italian Basketball Cup finals.

== High school career ==
Daye attended Woodbridge High School in Irvine, California, where he played for coach John Halagan. As a junior in 2005–06, he averaged 16 points, 9 rebounds and 3.4 blocks per game as he named to the All-CIF Southern Sectional Division II A first team and was an All-Orange County third team pick.

In November 2006, Daye signed a National Letter of Intent to play college basketball for Gonzaga.

As a senior in 2006–07, Daye averaged 30.9 points, 12.4 rebounds and 5.4 blocks per game as he was named to the Orange County Register first team after leading Orange County in scoring. He was also named Sea View League Player of the Year, CIF-Southern Section Division I Player of the Year and calhisports.com first-team All-State.

Considered a five-star recruit by Rivals.com, Daye was listed as the No. 7 small forward and the No. 25 player in the nation in 2007.

== College career ==
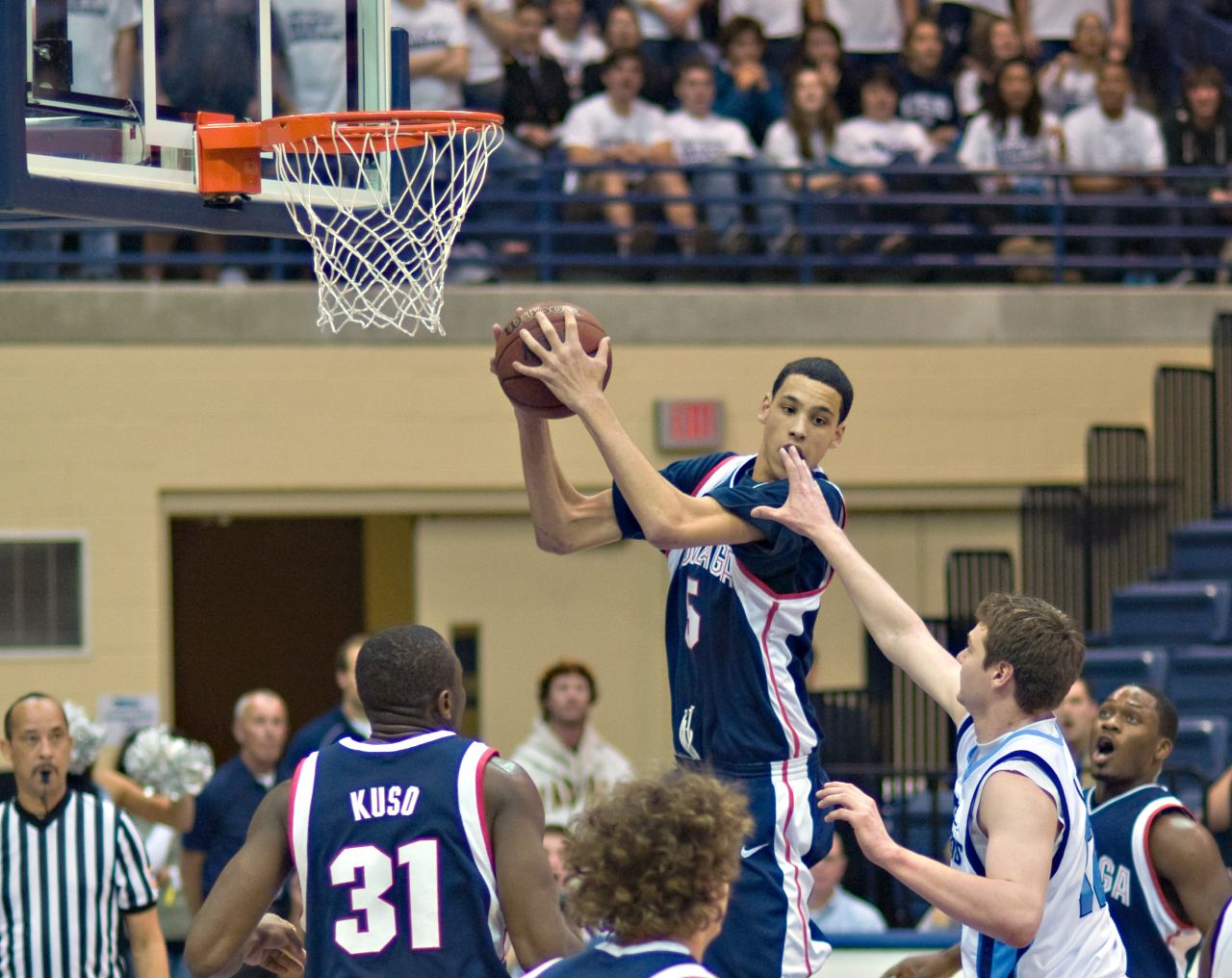
Daye (with ball) during his sophomore year at Gonzaga

In his freshman season at Gonzaga, Daye earned WCC All-Freshman Team and All-WCC Honorable Mention honors after averaging 10.5 points, 4.7 rebounds, 1.0 assists and 1.6 steals in 33 games.

In his sophomore season, Daye earned All-WCC Honorable Mention honors for the second straight year, in addition to earning NABC Division I All-District 9 second team honors. In 34 games, he averaged 12.7 points, 6.8 rebounds, 1.1 assists and 2.1 blocks per game.

In April 2009, Daye declared for the NBA draft, forgoing his final two years of college eligibility.

== Professional basketball career ==
=== National Basketball Association (NBA) (2009–2015) ===
Daye was drafted by the Detroit Pistons of the National Basketball Association (NBA) with the 15th overall pick in the 2009 NBA draft. On August 7, 2009, he signed his rookie scale contract with the Pistons.

On January 30, 2013, Daye and Tayshaun Prince were traded to the Memphis Grizzlies in exchange for José Calderón as part of a three-way deal that landed Rudy Gay in Toronto. At that time, Steve von Horn of SBNation.com wrote that Daye "came into the league with the physical tools to become a versatile contributor on both ends of the floor, but his virtues never quite materialized".

On August 1, 2013, Daye signed with the Toronto Raptors.

On February 20, 2014, Daye was traded to the San Antonio Spurs in exchange for Nando de Colo. Daye won a championship ring as a member of the Spurs, who defeated the Miami Heat 4–1 in the NBA Finals. Daye played only six minutes during the 2014 postseason and did not score. On January 10, 2015, Daye tallied 22 points and 10 rebounds to help the Spurs defeat the Minnesota Timberwolves, 108–93. A week later, he was waived by the Spurs.

On March 15, 2015, Daye signed a 10-day contract with the Atlanta Hawks. He then signed a second 10-day contract with the Hawks on March 25, and a multi-year contract on April 4. On July 9, 2015, he was waived by the Hawks. On September 28, 2015, Daye signed with the Cleveland Cavaliers. However, he was waived on October 23 after appearing in six preseason games.

=== Other professional basketball experience ===
==== Russian Professional Basketball League (2011) ====
On September 23, 2011, Daye signed a two-month contract with Khimki of the Russian Professional Basketball League. In December 2011, he returned to the Detroit Pistons following the conclusion of the 2011 NBA lockout.

==== NBA Development League (2014, 2015) ====
On March 15, 2014, Daye was assigned by the San Antonio Spurs to the Austin Toros of the NBA Development League. He was recalled the next day after having played one game with the team.

On February 16, 2015, Daye was acquired by the Erie BayHawks. He played 10 games with the team.

==== Lega Basket Serie A (2015–2016) ====
On November 27, 2015, Daye moved to the Italian Lega Basket Serie A, signing with Consultinvest Pesaro. In 21 games for the club in 2015–16, he averaged 21.2 points, 9.0 rebounds, 1.9 assists, 1.6 steals and 1.1 blocks and was selected to the Italian Serie A All-Star Game.

==== Bahraini Premier League (2016) ====
On May 6, 2016, Daye signed with Manama Club of the Bahraini Premier League for the 2016 GCC Basketball Clubs Championship.

==== The Basketball Tournament (TBT) (2016, 2017) ====
In the summers of 2016, and 2017, Daye played in The Basketball Tournament on ESPN for Team Challenge ALS. He competed for the $2 million prize in 2017, and for Team Challenge ALS, he averaged 13.3 points per game, also shooting 77 percent from the free-throw line. Daye helped take the sixth-seeded Team Challenge ALS to the Championship Game of the tournament, where they lost in a close game to Overseas Elite 86–83.

==== Galatasaray Odeabank (2016–2017) ====
On June 30, 2016, Daye signed with Galatasaray Odeabank of Turkey for the 2016–17 season.

==== Hapoel Jerusalem (2017–2018) ====
On August 9, 2017, Daye signed with the Israeli club Hapoel Jerusalem for the 2017–18 season. However, on January 3, 2018, Daye parted ways with Jerusalem after appearing in 19 games (both in the EuroCup and the Israeli Premier League competitions) and averaged 10.9 points and 3.7 rebounds per game.

==== Lega Basket Serie A (2018–2022) ====
On January 29, 2018, Daye returned to Italy for a second stint, signing with Umana Reyer Venezia for the rest of the season. On May 2, Daye won the FIBA Europe Cup championship with Reyer. He signed a two-year extension with the team on July 6, 2018.

In the 2018–19 season, Daye won his first Lega Basket Serie A (LBA) championship with Reyer. After winning the final series 4–3 over Dinamo Sassari, Daye was named LBA Finals MVP.

On February 16, 2020, Daye won his first Italian Cup with Reyer Venezia. He was named MVP of the competition.

In June 2020, Daye signed a multiyear contract with Reyer Venezia. The contract extends through the 2022–23 season.

=== New Taipei Kings (2022–2023) ===
On November 16, 2022, it was announced that the New Taipei Kings of the P. League+ had signed with Daye.

=== Victoria Libertas Pesaro (2023) ===
On March 8, 2023, Daye signed with Victoria Libertas Pesaro of the Italian Lega Basket Serie A (LBA).

=== New Taipei Kings (2024–2026) ===
On July 29, 2024, Daye had re-signed with the New Taipei Kings of the Taiwan Professional Basketball League (TPBL).

On August 14, 2025, Daye re-signed with the New Taipei Kings of the Taiwan Professional Basketball League (TPBL). On October 5, Daye announced that he would retire at the end of the 2025–26 season.

On May 3, 2026, New Taipei Kings held the retirement ceremony for Daye.

== Career statistics ==
Legend
GP	Games played	GS	Games started	MPG	Minutes per game
FG%	Field goal percentage	3P%	3-point field goal percentage	FT%	Free throw percentage
RPG	Rebounds per game	APG	Assists per game	SPG	Steals per game
BPG	Blocks per game	PPG	Points per game	**Bold**	Career high
†	Won an NBA championship

=== NBA ===
==== Regular season ====
Year	Team	GP	GS	MPG	FG%	3P%	FT%	RPG	APG	SPG	BPG	PPG
2009–10	Detroit	69	4	13.3	**.464**	.305	.821	2.5	.5	.4	.4	5.1
2010–11	Detroit	**72**	**16**	**20.1**	.410	.401	.759	**3.8**	**1.1**	**.5**	**.5**	**7.5**
2011–12	Detroit	41	4	14.7	.322	.210	.814	2.2	.8	**.5**	**.5**	4.7
2012–13	Detroit	24	0	14.5	.443	**.525**	.833	2.6	.9	.2	.3	5.1
2012–13	Memphis	31	0	10.6	.423	.345	.688	1.9	.7	.3	**.5**	4.0
2013–14†	Toronto	8	0	4.1	.231	.000	.667	.9	.3	.0	.0	1.0
2013–14†	San Antonio	14	1	8.2	.382	.414	.571	1.4	.4	.3	.4	4.1
2014–15	San Antonio	26	4	10.3	.348	.333	**1.000**	2.3	.3	.3	.1	4.0
2014–15	Atlanta	8	0	9.5	.385	.357	.500	1.8	1.0	**.5**	.3	3.3
Career		293	29	14.1	.402	.351	.778	2.6	.7	.4	.4	5.2

==== Playoffs ====
Year	Team	GP	GS	MPG	FG%	3P%	FT%	RPG	APG	SPG	BPG	PPG
2013	Memphis	**4**	0	5.0	**.375**	.000	**1.000**	.3	.0	.0	**.3**	**1.8**
2014†	San Antonio	1	0	**6.0**	.000	.000	.000	**1.0**	.0	.0	.0	.0
Career		5	0	5.2	.300	.000	1.000	.4	.0	.0	.2	1.4

=== College ===
Year	Team	GP	GS	MPG	FG%	3P%	FT%	RPG	APG	SPG	BPG	PPG
2007–08	Gonzaga	33	1	18.5	.475	.413	**.881**	4.7	1.0	.6	1.6	10.5
2008–09	Gonzaga	**34**	**33**	**26.3**	**.477**	**.429**	.706	**6.8**	**1.1**	**.7**	**2.1**	**12.7**
Career		67	34	21.2	.476	.419	.820	5.4	1.0	.7	1.8	11.3

== Personal life ==
Daye's father, Darren Daye, played five seasons in the NBA.

== See also ==
- List of second-generation NBA players
