= Stefano Tonut =

Italian basketball player (born 1993)

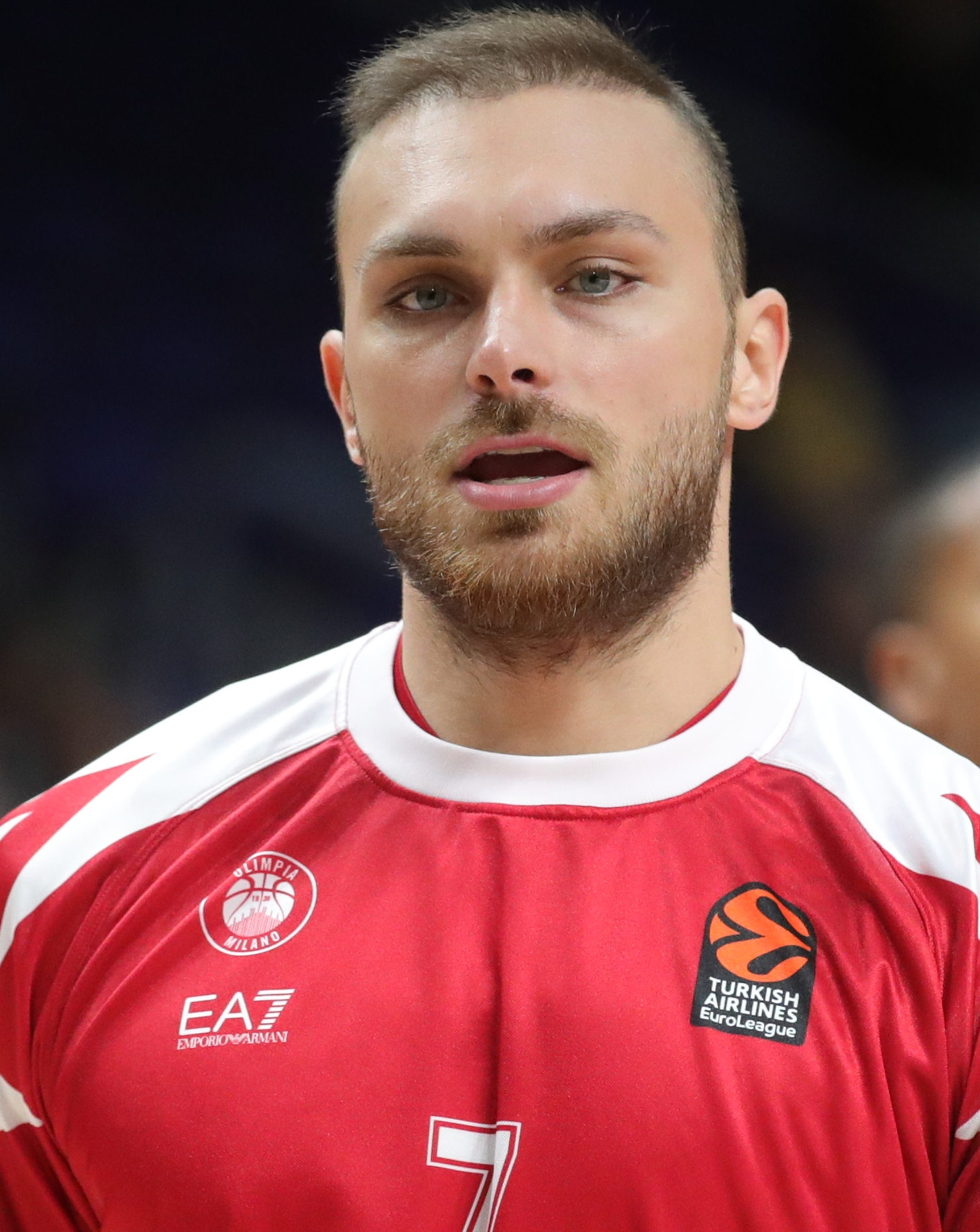
- Tonut with Olimpia Milano in 2023

No. 7 – Olimpia Milano
- Position: Shooting guard / point guard
- League: LBA; EuroLeague

Personal information
- Born: 7 November 1993 (age 33) Cantù, Italy
- Listed height: 1.94 m (6 ft 4 in)
- Listed weight: 100 kg (220 lb)

Career information
- NBA draft: 2015: undrafted
- Playing career: 2010–present

Career history
- 2010–2011: Monfalcone
- 2012–2015: Trieste
- 2015–2022: Reyer Venezia
- 2022–present: Olimpia Milano

Career highlights
- FIBA Europe Cup champion (2018); 5× Lega Serie A champion (2017, 2019, 2023, 2024, 2026); 2× Italian Cup winner (2020, 2026); 3× Italian Supercup winner (2024–2026); Lega Serie A MVP (2021); Lega Serie A Domestic Player of the Year (2021)
Medals
Men's basketball
Representing Italy
FIBA Europe U20 Championship
Gold medal – first place	2013 Tallinn

Stefano Tonut (born 7 November 1993) is an Italian professional basketball player for Olimpia Milano of the Italian Lega Basket Serie A (LBA) and the EuroLeague. Standing at 1.94 m (6 ft. 4 in.), he plays at the shooting guard and point guard positions.

== Professional career ==
Tonut came through the youth ranks of Monfalcone and Pallacanestro Trieste, before transferring again to Monfalcone, where he made his debut for the club’s men’s team in the amateur Italian third division during the 2010–11 campaign.

Tonut later returned to Pallacanestro Trieste where he played for the first time in the Serie A2 during the 2012-13 season. During the next two seasons, he was ranked as the fourth-best scorer in the league and the best Italian player of Serie A2 with averaging 19.2 points per game.

Tonut then joined Reyer Venezia of the professional Italian top-flight level league LBA in July 2015. In his first season with the team, he saw the court in 34 games in the LBA, scoring 2.8 points per outing. In the 2015–16 season, he marked his debut on the European club stage, participating in the European second tier EuroCup competition with Venezia.

In 2017 and 2019, Tonut won the LBA championship with Reyer.

In the 2020–21 season, Tonut won the LBA Most Valuable Player Award after averaging 15.6 points, 3.9 rebounds and 2.9 assists.

On 25 June 2022, Tonut signed with Olimpia Milano of the Italian Lega Basket Serie A (LBA) and the EuroLeague. On 28 June 2024, he renewed his contract with the Italian powerhouse. On July 11, 2026, Tonut extended his contract with the team for multi-years.

== International career ==
Tonut made his debut with the under-20 Italian national basketball team during FIBA Europe Under-20 Championship on 9 July 2013, scoring 10 points with 2 steals in the winning game against Lithuania Under-20 Team.

In 2015 he officially entered into the Italian senior national basketball team.

== Career statistics ==
Legend
GP	Games played	GS	Games started	MPG	Minutes per game
FG%	Field-goal percentage	3P%	3-point field-goal percentage	FT%	Free-throw percentage
RPG	Rebounds per game	APG	Assists per game	SPG	Steals per game
BPG	Blocks per game	PPG	Points per game	PIR	Performance index rating
**Bold**	Career high

=== EuroLeague ===
Year	Team	GP	GS	MPG	FG%	3P%	FT%	RPG	APG	SPG	BPG	PPG	PIR
2022–23	Olimpia Milano	24	3	15.2	**.532**	.387	**.688**	**2.0**	1.0	.5	—	4.5	5.6
2023–24	Olimpia Milano	**29**	**7**	**17.1**	.512	**.492**	.647	1.8	**1.2**	**.6**	.0	**5.8**	**5.8**
Career		53	10	16.2	.520	.457	.667	1.9	1.1	.6	.0	5.2	5.7

=== EuroCup ===
Year	Team	GP	GS	MPG	FG%	3P%	FT%	RPG	APG	SPG	BPG	PPG	PIR
2015–16	Reyer Venezia	**16**	1	12.7	.333	.269	.667	1.7	.9	.4	.1	3.8	3.1
2019–20	Reyer Venezia	12	5	20.3	.430	.303	**.889**	2.1	1.5	.2	**.2**	8.3	5.5
2020–21	Reyer Venezia	7	6	24.3	.422	**.385**	.846	1.6	2.3	**.7**	.1	**10.7**	8.4
2021–22	Reyer Venezia	**16**	**12**	**25.1**	**.440**	.328	.862	**2.8**	**3.1**	.6	—	10.6	**10.9**
Career		51	24	20.0	.414	.322	.833	2.1	1.9	.4	.1	7.9	6.8

=== Basketball Champions League ===
Year	Team	GP	GS	MPG	FG%	3P%	FT%	RPG	APG	SPG	BPG	PPG
2016–17	Reyer Venezia	4	2	18.4	**.526**	.400	.500	**3.2**	1.7	**1.2**	—	5.7
2017–18	Reyer Venezia	8	**3**	17.7	.386	.333	.706	2.0	**2.4**	.4	**.1**	6.6
2018–19	Reyer Venezia	**13**	**3**	**19.3**	.475	**.410**	**.725**	2.5	1.7	.5	—	**10.7**
Career		25	8	18.6	.457	.385	.712	2.5	1.9	.6	.0	8.6

=== FIBA Europe Cup ===
Year	Team	GP	GS	MPG	FG%	3P%	FT%	RPG	APG	SPG	BPG	PPG
2017–18	Reyer Venezia	8	3	17.3	.490	.556	1.000	1.6	1.6	1.2	—	7.7
Career		8	3	17.3	.490	.556	1.000	1.6	1.6	1.2	—	7.7

=== Domestic leagues ===
Year	Team	League	GP	MPG	FG%	3P%	FT%	RPG	APG	SPG	BPG	PPG
2012–13	(Italy) Trieste	LegaDue	13	9.8	.471	.400	.500	1.1	—	.8	—	3.1
2013–14	(Italy) Trieste	Serie A2	29	21.8	.414	.324	.808	1.8	1.1	1.0	.2	6.7
2014–15	(Italy) Trieste	Serie A2	37	32.1	.425	.369	.809	4.0	2.4	2.0	.2	18.8
2015–16	(Italy) Reyer Venezia	LBA	39	15.1	.456	.328	.765	1.7	1.0	.7	.0	4.9
2016–17	(Italy) Reyer Venezia	LBA	35	19.9	.500	.431	.804	2.0	2.1	.9	.1	8.3
2017–18	(Italy) Reyer Venezia	LBA	27	20.9	.411	.258	.706	3.2	1.5	.7	.1	6.1
2018–19	(Italy) Reyer Venezia	LBA	39	20.2	.454	.331	.746	2.5	2.1	.8	.0	9.1
2019–20	(Italy) Reyer Venezia	LBA	17	19.0	.487	.270	.741	2.1	1.9	.5	.1	8.6
2020–21	(Italy) Reyer Venezia	LBA	33	29.1	.468	.360	.810	3.9	2.9	1.3	.2	15.6
2021–22	(Italy) Reyer Venezia	LBA	29	29.6	.456	.319	.804	2.9	3.0	1.2	.0	14.0
2022–23	(Italy) Olimpia Milano	LBA	37	14.2	.450	.310	.743	1.8	.8	.4	—	3.7
2023–24	(Italy) Olimpia Milano	LBA	38	21.8	.457	.288	.760	2.9	1.6	1.0	.0	7.0
