= Kassius Robertson =

Canadian basketball player (born 1994)

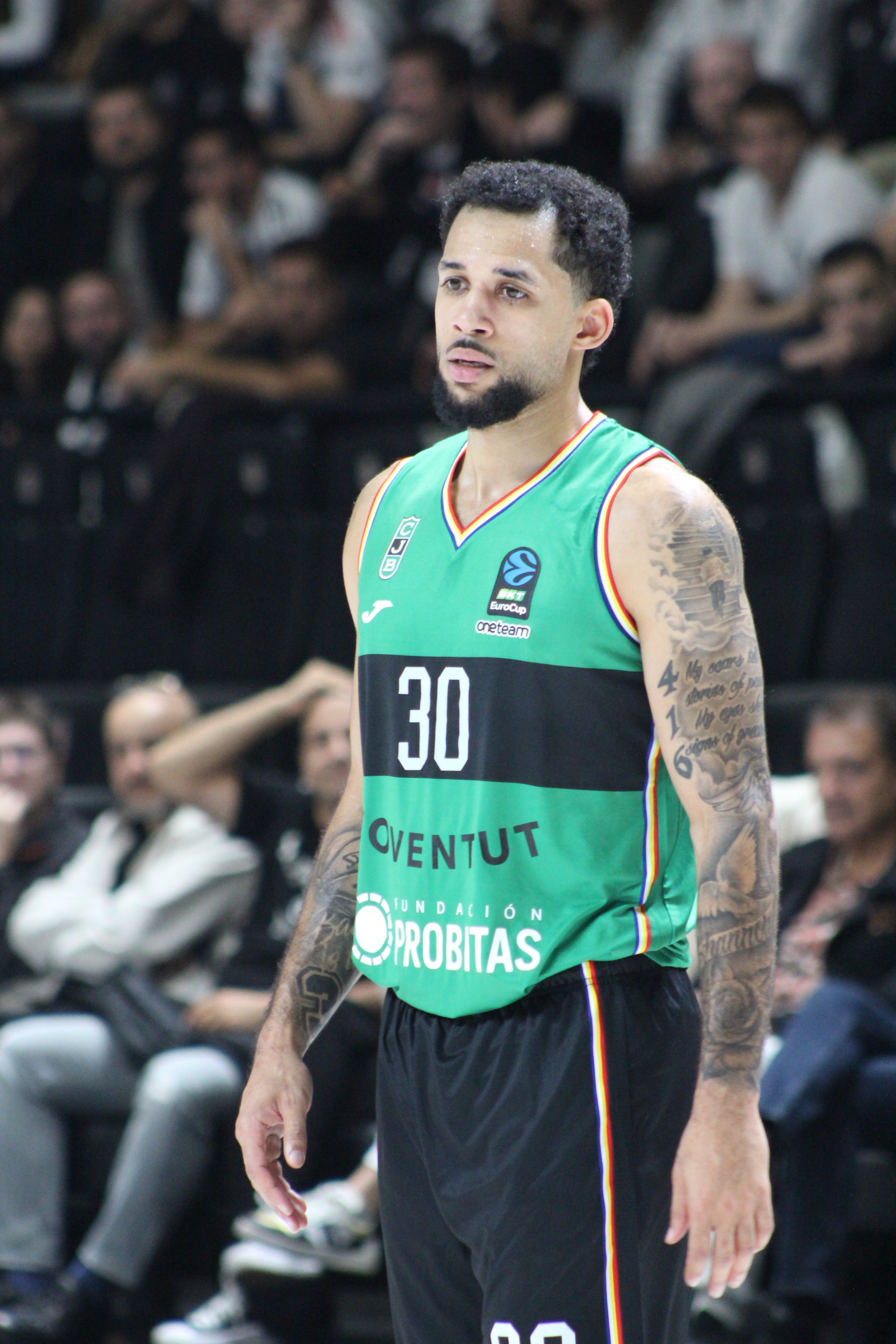
- Robertson with Joventut Badalona in 2024

No. 30 – BC Andorra
- Position: Shooting guard
- League: Liga ACB

Personal information
- Born: April 20, 1994 (age 32) Toronto, Ontario, Canada
- Listed height: 6 ft 3 in (1.91 m)
- Listed weight: 182 lb (83 kg)

Career information
- High school: Vaughan (Vaughan, Ontario); Thornlea (Thornhill, Ontario)
- College: Canisius (2014–2017); Missouri (2017–2018)
- NBA draft: 2018: undrafted
- Playing career: 2018–present

Career history
- 2018–2019: Medi Bayreuth
- 2019: Niagara River Lions
- 2019–2020: Fortitudo Bologna
- 2020–2021: Obradoiro
- 2021: Niagara River Lions
- 2021–2022: Obradoiro
- 2022: Reggio Emilia
- 2022–2023: Obradoiro
- 2023: Scarborough Shooting Stars
- 2023–2024: Valencia
- 2024–2025: Joventut Badalona
- 2025–2026: Lokomotiv Kuban
- 2026: Gran Canaria
- 2026–present: BC Andorra

Career highlights
- Liga ACB Top Scorer (2023); CEBL champion (2023); First-team All-SEC (2018); Second-team All-MAAC (2017)

Kassius Robertson (born April 20, 1994) is a Canadian professional basketball player for BC Andorra of the Liga ACB. He played college basketball for the Canisius Golden Griffins and Missouri Tigers.

== Early life ==
Robertson is the son of Shannon Robertson and grew up in Toronto. He is of Jamaican descent. He played baseball and soccer growing up but decided to focus on basketball in eighth grade. He attended Vaughan Secondary School, where he was a bench player on a team led by Andrew Wiggins. Robertson followed his AAU coach Shane James to Thornlea Secondary School to try to get more playing time. As a senior, he posted 22 points, five assists and two steals per game. Even so, he was lightly recruited, and only received his lone Division I offer from Canisius after assistant coach Mike Mennenga came to scout a different player. Other college coaches liked his shooting but thought he was skinny and frail.

== College career ==
Robertson redshirted his freshman season at Canisius, hitting the weight room and staying in the gym late. Campus police sometimes told Robertson to leave the gym. In his redshirt freshman year, Robertson scored 6.8 points per game and was named to the MAAC All-Rookie Team. Throughout his Canisius career, he developed into a productive 3-point shooter and potent scorer. He averaged 14.1 points per game as a sophomore in 2015-16. He scored 16 points in a 93-69 loss to Kentucky on November 13, 2016. As a redshirt junior, Robertson averaged 16.1 points, 3.1 rebounds and 2.4 assists per game. He was named to the Second Team All-MAAC. After his junior season, he opted to transfer to Missouri, choosing the Tigers over Georgia Tech because he liked Cuonzo Martin’s coaching philosophy.

Robertson expected to be a three-point specialist playing alongside Michael Porter Jr., however his role expanded when Porter was injured in the first game. Robertson scored 23 points in a win against Wagner on November 13, 2017, shooting 5 for 8 on three-pointers. In a victory over St. John's on November 24, he posted 17 points and five assists. He organized late night team meetings after the team dropped three straight SEC games. Missouri rebounded to record a five game winning streak, during which time Robertson scored 20.6 points per game. Over this stretch he won two SEC Player of the Week awards. As a graduate transfer at Missouri, Robertson led the Tigers in scoring with 16.6 points per game while shooting 43 percent from behind the arc. At the conclusion of the regular season he was named to the First Team All-SEC. Robertson competed in a 3-on-3 tournament after the season alongside other SEC players.

== Professional career ==
In June 2018 Robertson signed with Medi Bayreuth of the Basketball Bundesliga league. He averaged 12.3 points per game in the Bundesliga.

In 2019, Robertson signed with the Niagara River Lions of the Canadian Elite Basketball League, where he played for seven games before being invited to play for the Charlotte Hornets in the 2019 NBA Summer League.

In July 2019, Robertson signed with Fortitudo Bologna of the Lega Basket Serie A. He was called in the Canadian national team for the first window of the FIBA AmeriCup qualifiers where he procured himself an injury that compromised the rest of the season. On March 3, 2020, Robertson was released by the team.

On July 17, 2020, Robertson signed with Monbus Obradoiro of the Liga ACB.

On February 24, 2021, Robertson re-signed with the Niagara River Lions.

On August 15, 2022, he has signed with Reggio Emilia of the Italian Lega Basket Serie A (LBA).

On November 27, 2022, Robertson signed with Monbus Obradoiro of the Liga ACB.

On May 10, 2023, Robertson signed with the Scarborough Shooting Stars of the Canadian Elite Basketball League.

On July 17, 2023, Robertson signed a two-year deal with Valencia. On June 7, 2024, the Spanish club opted out of their mutual contract. In a total of 54 games, Robertson averaged 6 points and 1 assist per contest.

On June 26, 2024, he signed with Joventut Badalona of the Spanish Liga ACB.

On January 18, 2026, he signed with Dreamland Gran Canaria of the Spanish Liga ACB and Basketball Champions League.

On July 16, 2026, he signed with MoraBanc Andorra of the Spanish Liga ACB.

== Career statistics ==
Legend
GP	Games played	GS	Games started	MPG	Minutes per game
FG%	Field-goal percentage	3P%	3-point field-goal percentage	FT%	Free-throw percentage
RPG	Rebounds per game	APG	Assists per game	SPG	Steals per game
BPG	Blocks per game	PPG	Points per game	PIR	Performance index rating
**Bold**	Career high

=== EuroLeague ===
Year	Team	GP	GS	MPG	FG%	3P%	FT%	RPG	APG	SPG	BPG	PPG	PIR
2023–24	Valencia	30	16	15.7	.307	.279	.647	1.3	.7	.3	.0	4.1	1.6
Career		30	16	15.7	.307	.279	.647	1.3	.7	.3	.0	4.1	1.6
