= Nicolò Dellosto =

Italian basketball player (born 2000)

No. 9 – Pallacanestro Crema
- Position: Small forward
- League: Serie B Basket

Personal information
- Born: June 4, 2000 (age 26) Trieste, Italy
- Listed height: 2.00 m (6 ft 7 in)
- Listed weight: 98 kg (216 lb)

Career information
- Playing career: 2019–present

Career history
- 2019–2020: Fortitudo Bologna
- 2020–2021: Kleb Basket Ferrara
- 2021–2022: Benedetto XIV Cento
- 2022–2023: Napoli Basket
- 2023–2024: Umana Chiusi
- 2024–2025: Pallacanestro Roseto
- 2025–2026: Pistoia Basket 2000
- 2026–present: Pallacanestro Crema

Nicolò Dellosto (born June 4, 2000) is an Italian professional basketball player for Pallacanestro Crema of the Italian Serie B Basket. He plays as a small forward.
