= Kelvin Martin (basketball) =

American basketball player

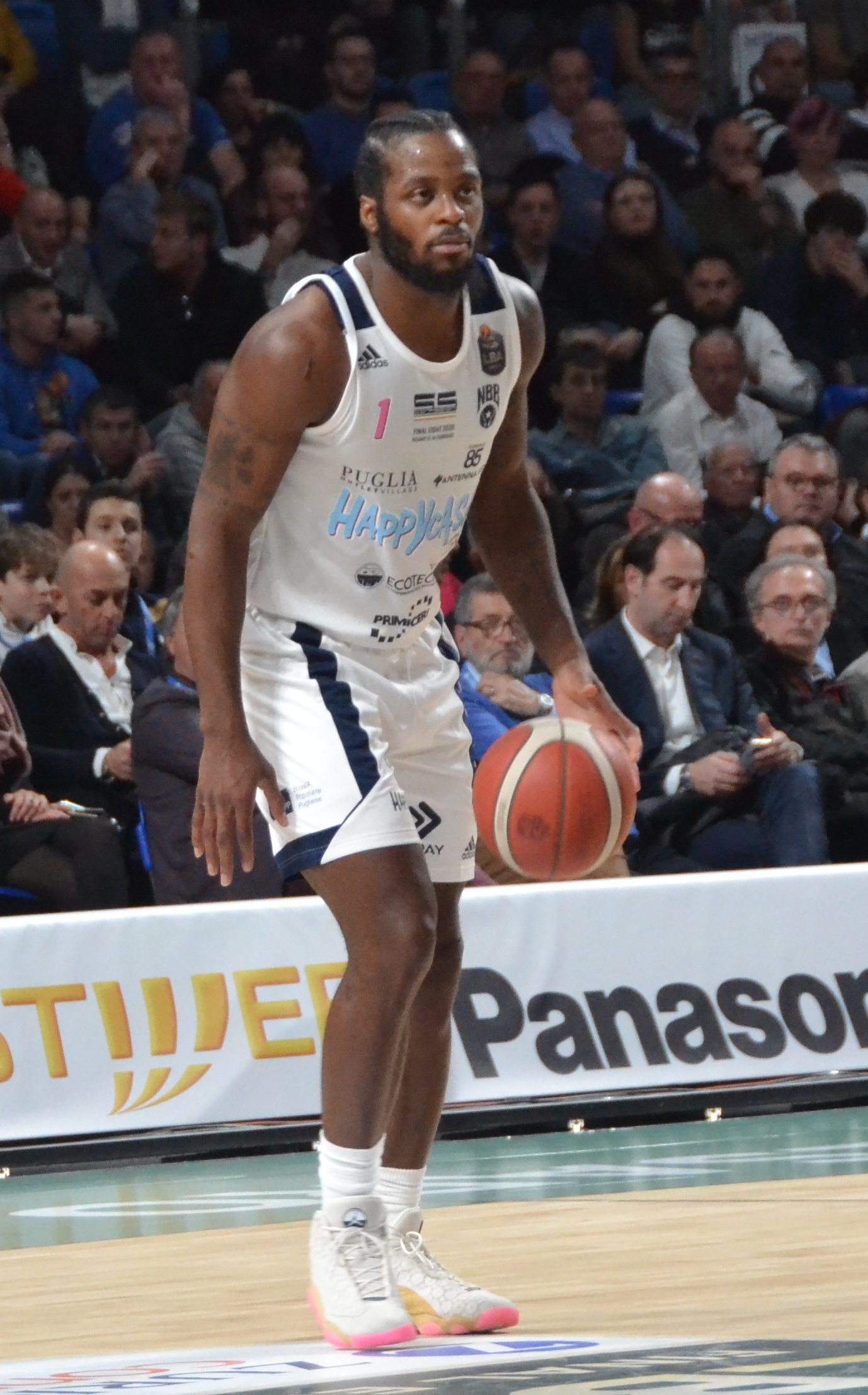
- Martin with Brindisi in 2020

Personal information
- Born: September 10, 1989 (age 37) Adel, Georgia
- Listed height: 1.96 m (6 ft 5 in)
- Listed weight: 94 kg (207 lb)

Career information
- High school: Cook County (Adel, Georgia)
- College: Charleston Southern (2008–2012)
- NBA draft: 2012: undrafted
- Playing career: 2012–2024
- Position: Small forward

Career history
- 2012–2014: Matrixx Magixx
- 2014–2015: MLP Academics Heidelberg
- 2015–2016: Fortitudo Agrigento
- 2016–2017: Riesen Ludwigsburg
- 2017–2018: Vanoli Cremona
- 2018–2019: Virtus Bologna
- 2019–2020: Brindisi
- 2020–2021: Dolomiti Energia Trento
- 2021–2022: MLP Academics Heidelberg
- 2022–2023: Shiga Lakes
- 2023–2024: Iwate Big Bulls

Career highlights
- Champions League champion (2019); All-Champions League Defensive Team (2019)

Kelvin Martin (born September 10, 1989) is an American former basketball player. Martin played college basketball for CSU. After turning professional in 2012, Martin played for several clubs in the Netherlands, Germany and Italy. In 2019, he won the Basketball Champions League with Virtus Bologna.

== Professional career ==
Martin started his professional career with Matrixx Magixx of the Dutch Basketball League (DBL). In his rookie season, he averaged 15.4 points and 5.7 rebounds per game with Magixx. On January 5, 2014, Martin re-signed with the Magixx for the remainder of the 2013–14 season.

In his third professional season, Martin played with German side MLP Academics Heidelberg of the second tier ProA. He averaged 15.1 points, 5.4 rebounds and 1.8 assists in 30 games with Heidelberg.

During the 2018–19 season, Martin played with Virtus Bologna and won the Basketball Champions League trophy with the team.

On June 22, 2019, he has signed with Happy Casa Brindisi of the Lega Basket Serie A. Martin averaged 8.9 points, 6.7 rebounds, 2.2 assists and 1.6 steals per game in Serie A. He signed with Dolomiti Energia Trento of the Italian Lega Basket Serie A on August 13, 2020.

On August 14, 2020, Martin signed a one-year agreement with Aquila Basket Trento in the Italian Lega Basket Serie A (LBA) and EuroCup.

On September 10, 2021, Martin returned to MLP Academics Heidelberg in the German Bundesliga.

== Honours ==
=== Club ===
Virtus Bologna

- Basketball Champions League: 2018–19
