= Luca Dalmonte =

Italian professional basketball coach

Personal information
- Born: 3 October 1963 (age 63)
- Position: Head coach
- Coaching career: 1996–present

Luca Dalmonte (born 3 October 1963) is an Italian professional basketball coach.

From 2013 to 2015 he was head coach of Virtus Roma in Italy's Lega Basket Serie A and has also been the assistant coach of Italy's national basketball team.

In 2012–13, he was coach for Fenerbahçe in Turkey.

On 23 March 2022 he signed with Skyliners Frankfurt of the Basketball Bundesliga.
