= David Moss (basketball) =

American professional basketball player (born 1983)

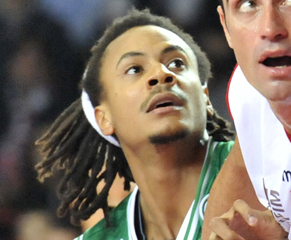

Basket Brescia Leonessa
- Title: Assistant coach
- League: LBA

Personal information
- Born: September 9, 1983 (age 43) Chicago, Illinois, U.S.
- Listed height: 6 ft 5 in (1.96 m)
- Listed weight: 220 lb (100 kg)

Career information
- High school: Thornwood (South Holland, Illinois)
- College: Indiana State (2002–2006)
- NBA draft: 2006: undrafted
- Playing career: 2006–2023
- Position: Shooting guard / small forward
- Number: 34

Career history

Playing
- 2006–2007: Polpak Swiecie
- 2007–2008: Aurora Basket Jesi
- 2008–2009: Teramo Basket
- 2009–2010: Virtus Bologna
- 2010–2013: Montepaschi Siena
- 2013–2015: Emporio Armani Milano
- 2016–2023: Germani Brescia

Coaching
- 2023–present: Germani Brescia (assistant)

Career highlights
- 4× Italian League champion (2011–2014); 4× Italian Cup winner (2011–2013, 2023); 2× Italian Supercup winner (2010, 2011); Italian Second Division Cup winner (2008); Serie A2 League champion (2016); 2× Italian League All-Star (2011, 2012)

David Jerard Moss (born September 9, 1983) is an American professional basketball coach and former player. He was a 6 ft 5 in (1.96 m) shooting guard-small forward. He is the current assistant coach for Pallacanestro Brescia of Lega Basket Serie A.

== Collegiate career ==
Moss attended Thornwood High School in South Holland, Illinois, USA. There he played basketball, soccer, tennis, and track & field. He played basketball at Indiana State University, where he played with the Indiana State Sycamores in the Missouri Valley Conference. While there, he was named Conference Freshman of the Year, and earned All-Conference Team honors all four years. He finished as the school's sixth all-time leading scorer, with 1,562 points career points scored; currently, he ranks seventh.

== Professional career ==
Moss went undrafted by an NBA team and started his professional career in the 2006–07 season in the Polish League, playing with Polpak Swiecie. Following that season, he played in the NBA Summer League with the Atlanta Hawks. Not able to make the team, he went back to Europe to play in the Italian Second Division, with Aurora Jesi, during the 2007–08 season. With Jesi, he won the Italian Second Division Cup.

The following season, 2008–09, he played with Teramo Basket in the Italian First Division, and enjoyed great success there, finishing second in the league MVP voting to Terrell McIntyre. After playing in the 2009 NBA Summer League with the Portland Trail Blazers, he signed a three-year contract with the Italian club Montepaschi Siena, but he first joined Virtus Bologna on a sports loan, until the end of the contract's first season.

With Montepaschi Siena, Moss helped the team to win eight national domestic titles; winning three Italian League championships (2011, 2012, 2013), three Italian Cup titles (2011, 2012, 2013), and two Italian Supercup titles (2010, 2011). He was also named an Italian League All-Star for the 2010–11 and 2011–12 seasons.

On July 29, 2013, Moss officially signed a two-year contract with Emporio Armani Milano.

On March 16, 2016, Moss signed with Basket Brescia Leonessa, a Serie A2 Basket team for the rest of the 2015–16 season. At the end of the season, the club was promoted in Serie A after 24 years.

On July 2, 2016, Moss re-signed with Basket Brescia Leonessa. On February 2, 2018, he signed a two-year contract extension with Brescia. As of February 23, 2022; Moss remains the Team Captain of Brescia.

== Career statistics ==
Legend
GP	Games played	GS	Games started	MPG	Minutes per game
FG%	Field-goal percentage	3P%	3-point field-goal percentage	FT%	Free-throw percentage
RPG	Rebounds per game	APG	Assists per game	SPG	Steals per game
BPG	Blocks per game	PPG	Points per game	PIR	Performance index rating
**Bold**	Career high

=== Euroleague ===
Year	Team	GP	GS	MPG	FG%	3P%	FT%	RPG	APG	SPG	BPG	PPG	PIR
2010–11	Montepaschi	22	20	21.4	**.477**	**.452**	.806	2.4	**1.8**	**1.4**	**.4**	7.6	7.4
2011–12	Montepaschi	20	15	22.7	.455	.420	.870	2.5	1.1	.9	.3	8.2	6.8
2012–13	Montepaschi	24	**24**	**30.8**	.420	.396	**.875**	**4.0**	1.5	.7	.0	**9.8**	**8.7**
2013–14	Milano	**26**	16	24.9	.451	.364	.806	3.6	1.5	1.0	.1	7.3	7.6
2014–15	Milano	23	13	21.1	.398	.333	.773	3.1	1.2	.7	.1	5.0	5.0
2015–16	Milano	23	13	21.1	.398	.333	.773	3.1	1.2	.7	.1	5.0	5.0
Career		202	98	27.3	.463	.403	.794	4.2	1.4	.9	.3	7.6	10.2
