= Antimo Martino =

Italian basketball coach

Pallacanestro Forlì 2.015
- Position: Head coach
- League: Lega Serie A2

Personal information
- Born: 16 August 1978 (age 48) Isernia, Italy
- Coaching career: 2005–present

Career history

Coaching
- 2005–2014: Virtus Roma (assistant)
- 2014–2018: Basket Ravenna
- 2018–2020: Fortitudo Bologna
- 2020–2021: Pallacanestro Reggiana
- 2021–2022: Fortitudo Bologna
- 2022–present: Pallacanestro Forlì 2.015

Career highlights
- Serie A2 Basket champion (2019); Serie A2 Supercup (2018); A2 League Best Coach (2019)

Antimo Martino (born 16 August 1978) is an Italian professional basketball coach, currently managing Pallacanestro Forlì 2.015 in the Lega Serie A2. He has also served as the head coach for Fortitudo Bologna.

== Career ==
Antimo Martino started his coach-career with Virtus Roma as assistant coach from 2005 to 2014.

He became head-coach for the first time with Basket Ravenna in the Serie A2 league in 2014 and the following 4 seasons. Martino had a big success with Ravenna reaching the A2 Playoffs' semifinals of the 2016–17 season. In 2018 he reached the final of the Italian LNP Cup.

On 12 June 2018 Martino became the new head-coach of Fortitudo Bologna. He won the 2018 A2 Supercup and, in March 2019, he achieved the promotion to LBA, the men's top professional basketball division of the Italian basketball league system. He was named as best coach of the 2018–19 A2 season. With Martino, Fortitudo Bologna won their 1st A2 title by beating Virtus Roma in the Finals.

He was hired by Reggio Emilia on 27 May 2020 for the 2020–21 season. But on 25 March 2021 he was removed from his place after a disappointing losing streak.

At the beginning of the 2021–22 season, Martino was called back to Fortitudo Bologna to replace Jasmin Repeša who resigned after only one official match in the championship.

== Honours and titles ==
Head coach

- Serie A2 Basket: 1

Fortitudo Bologna (2019)

- LNP Supercup: 1

Fortitudo Bologna (2018)
