= Stefano Mancinelli =

Italian basketball player

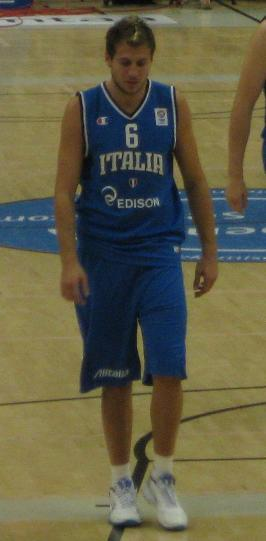

Personal information
- Born: March 17, 1983 (age 43) Chieti, Italy
- Listed height: 2.03 m (6 ft 8 in)
- Listed weight: 102 kg (225 lb)

Career information
- NBA draft: 2005: undrafted
- Playing career: 2000–2022
- Position: Small forward / power forward
- Number: 6

Career history
- 2000–2009: Fortitudo Bologna
- 2009–2012: Olimpia Milano
- 2013: Pallacanestro Cantù
- 2013–2016: Auxilium CUS Torino
- 2016–2022: Fortitudo Bologna

Career highlights
- Italian League champion (2005); Italian Supercup winner (2005); Italian All-Star Game MVP (2011)

Stefano Mancinelli (born March 17, 1983) is a retired Italian professional basketball player. He also represented the Italian national basketball team. Standing at 2.03 m (6 ft 8 in), he played at the small forward and power forward positions.

== Professional career ==
Mancinelli joined Fortitudo Bologna in 2000, and he made his debut in the Italian League on April 14, 2001, against Viola Reggio Calabria. He was the captain of Fortitudo from 2005 to 2009, following the team's previous captain, Gianluca Basile. With Fortitudo, he lost the final game of the EuroLeague in the Euroleague 2003–04 season, when they were defeated by Maccabi Tel Aviv. However, he won the Italian Championship with Fortitudo in 2005 against Olimpia Milano. He also won the Italian SuperCup in 2005. In 2007, Mancinelli participated with the Portland Trail Blazers summer squad during the NBA Summer League in Las Vegas, Nevada. In August 2009, he joined Olimpia Milano. In the summer of 2012, Mancinelli and Olimpia parted ways and he became free agent. In January 2013, he signed with Pallacanestro Cantù for the rest of the season. In August 2013, he signed a three-year deal with PMS Torino. In July 2016, he returned to Fortitudo Bologna. Mancinelli played at Bologna until 2022.

== Italian national team ==
Mancinelli is also a member of the senior Italian national team. With Italy's junior national team, he reached the fourth place at the 2000 FIBA Europe Under-18 Championship, and he also participated with Italy's junior national team at the 2002 FIBA Europe Under-20 Championship. He won the bronze medal at the 2001 Mediterranean Games.

In 2005, Italian senior national team coach Carlo Recalcati, added him to Italy's roster for the 2005 FIBA European Championship, and the following year he was a member of the Italian roster at the 2006 FIBA World Championship. He also played at the 2007 FIBA European Championship.

During a friendly match between Canada and Italy on August 1, 2009, Mancinelli elbowed Canadian national team player Aaron Doornekamp in the back of the head. Blindsided, Doornekamp was knocked to the ground and Mancinelli lurched towards him, sparking a bench clearing brawl between both teams. No more punches were thrown but the incident resulted in a lengthy delay. A video of the incident shows that Italian players Andrea Bargnani and Marco Belinelli tried to break up the skirmish. Doornekamp did not sustain any serious injuries and Italian team captain Matteo Soragna apologized after the game: "I am sorry that it happened. The team has responded as one and that is a positive, although we did not want the incident to happen."
