= Vitrifrigo Arena =

Indoor sports arena in Pesaro, Italy

- l'Astronave ("the Starship")
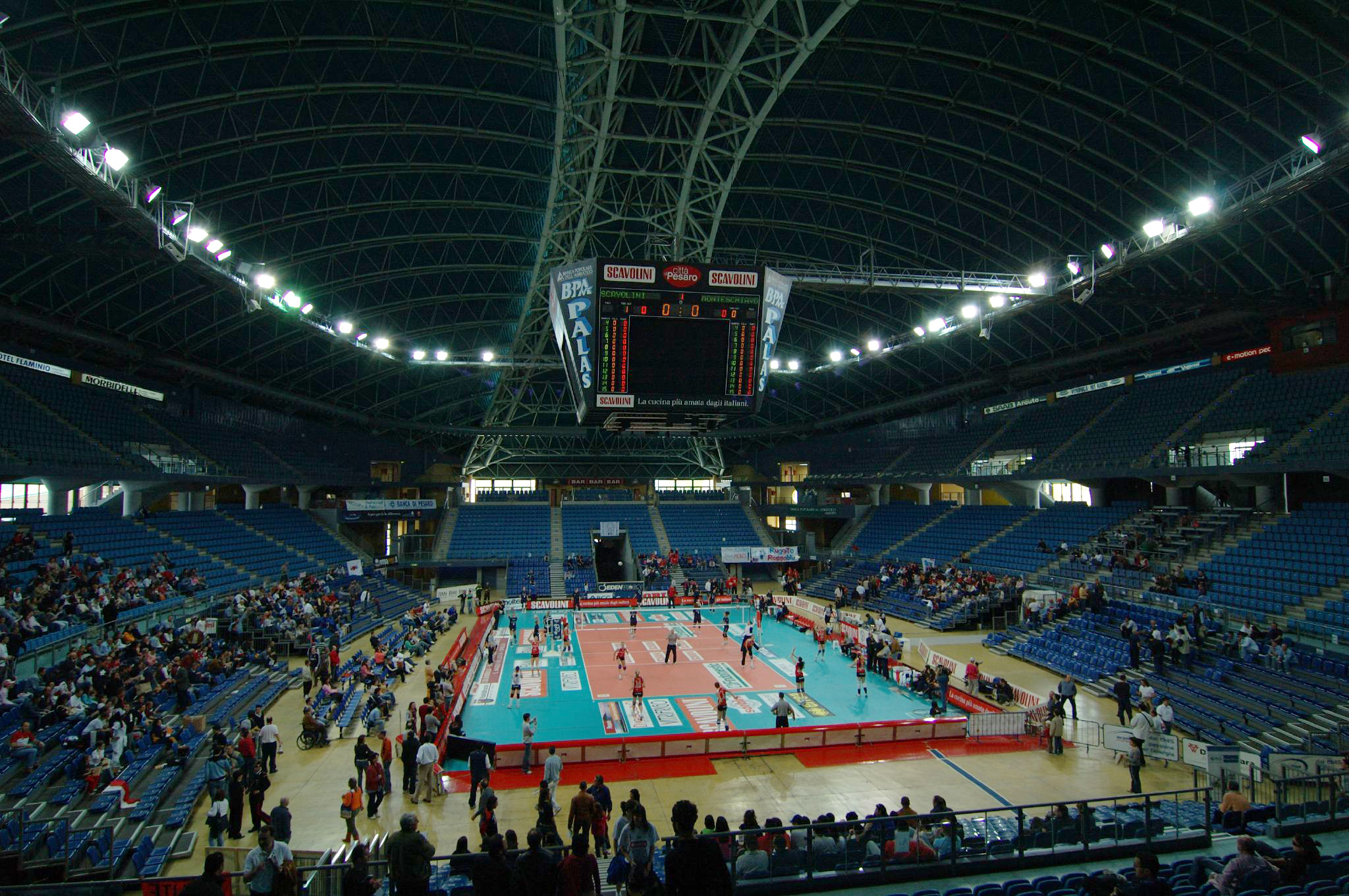
- Arena during a volleyball match in April 2006
- Interactive map of Vitrifrigo Arena
- Former names: Adriatic Arena (2006–2018); BPA Palas (1996–2006)
- Location: Pesaro, Italy
- Coordinates: 43°54′10″N 12°52′0″E
- Owner: Municipality of Pesaro
- Operator: Aspes S.p.A.
- Capacity: 10,323 seats

Construction
- Built: 1993–1996
- Opened: August 1996
- Architect: Interstudio
- Structural engineer: Massimo Majowiecki (Interstudio)
- General contractors: Bonatti S.p.A. (Forlì); Sigla S.p.A. (Forlì); Palapesaro

Tenant
- Victoria Libertas Pesaro

Website
- www.vitrifrigoarena.it

Vitrifrigo Arena, formerly known as Adriatic Arena and originally BPA Palas, is an indoor sports arena in Pesaro, Italy, home to the Victoria Libertas Pesaro professional basketball team of the Lega Basket Serie A. Its seating capacity is 10,300, rising to 13,000 for concerts, which makes it the fifth-biggest indoor arena in Italy.

== Construction ==
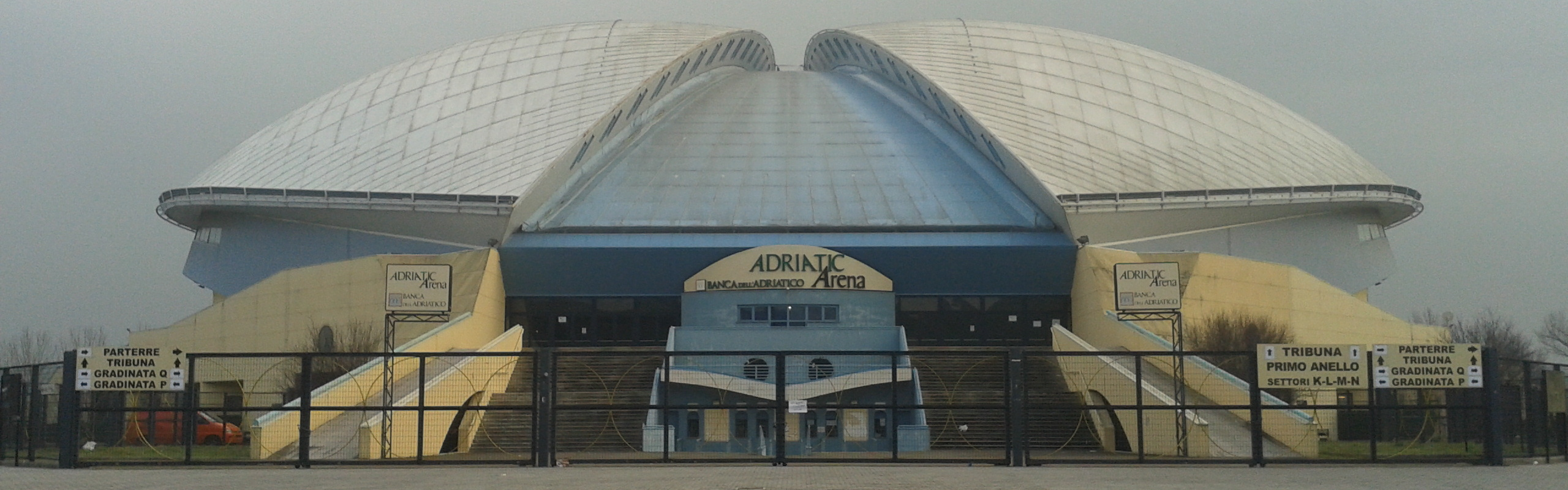
Exterior view of the venue (2013)

Construction work began in 1993 and was completed in 1996. The venue was inaugurated with a recital by operatic tenor Luciano Pavarotti. The venue considered a futuristic construction, known to most as "the Spaceship" (l'Astronave), or as "the Ladybug" (la Coccinella) due to its external shell shape. It covers an area of 12,000 square meters and a land area of 13,000 square meters.

The multi-purpose arena is equipped with a press stand, a room for video data, a system for satellite reception, various video stations and an internal circuit control system. The venue also configures into a (much smaller) theater that is used each August for the world-renowned Rossini Opera Festival.

== See also ==
- List of indoor arenas in Italy
