= Ed Daniel =

American basketball player (born 1990)

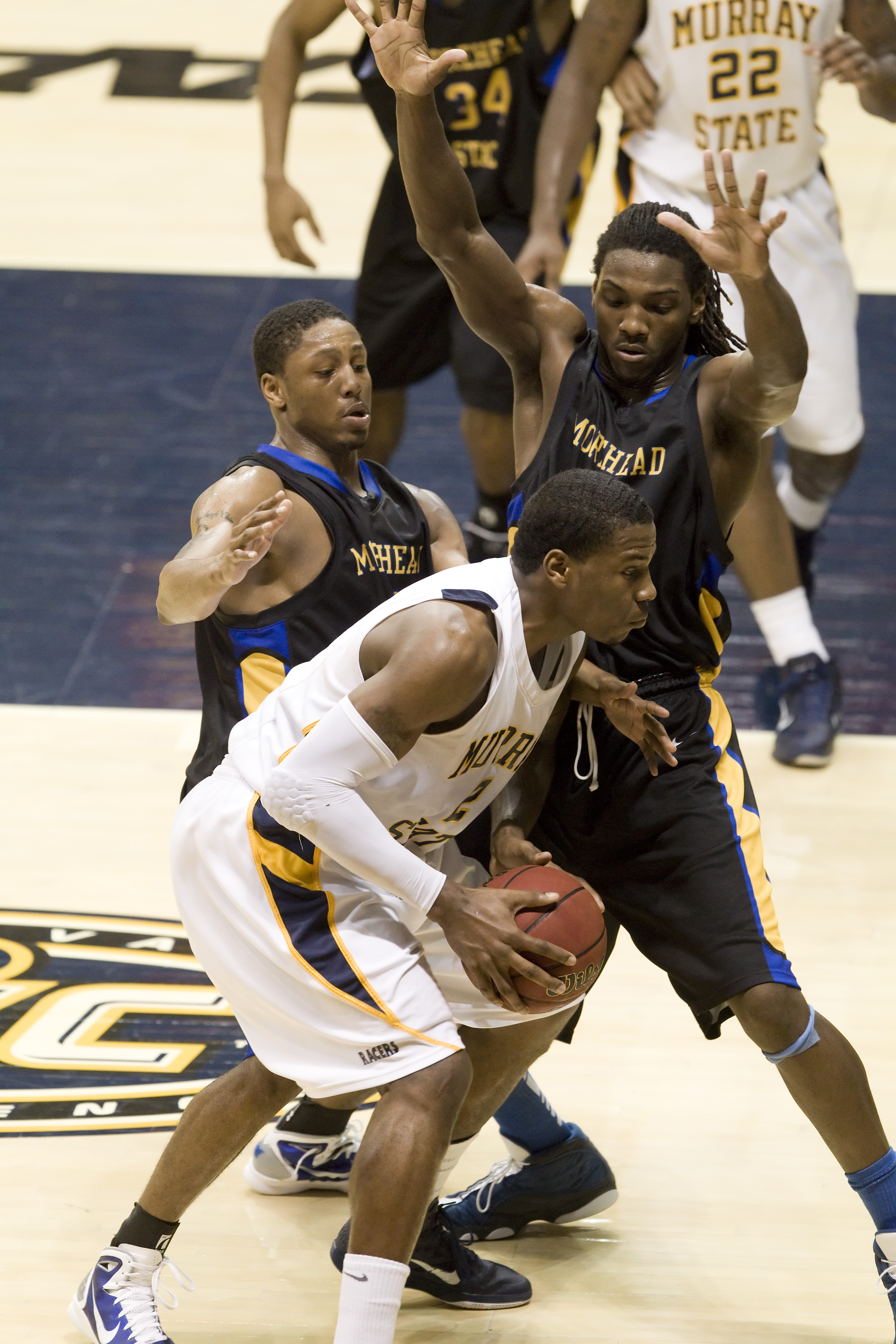
- Daniel (with ball) at Murray State.

Scafati Basket
- Position: Power forward / center
- League: Serie A2 Basket

Personal information
- Born: June 13, 1990 (age 36) Birmingham, Alabama, US
- Listed height: 6 ft 8 in (2.03 m)
- Listed weight: 225 lb (102 kg)

Career information
- High school: Woodlawn (Birmingham, Alabama)
- College: Murray State (2009–2013)
- NBA draft: 2013: undrafted
- Playing career: 2013–present

Career history
- 2013–2014: Pistoia Basket 2000
- 2014–2015: Pallacanestro Varese
- 2015: Vanoli Cremona
- 2015–2016: Fortitudo Bologna
- 2016–2017: Maccabi Ashdod
- 2017–2018: Châlons-Reims
- 2018–2019: Peristeri
- 2019–2020: Fortitudo Bologna
- 2020–2021: Iraklis
- 2021: Rahoveci
- 2021–present: Scafati Basket

Career highlights
- First-team All-OVC (2013)

Edward Daniel (born June 13, 1990) is an American professional basketball player for Scafati Basket of the Serie A2 Basket. He played college basketball at Murray State University.

== College career ==
After starring at Woodlawn High School in Birmingham, Daniel committed to play college basketball for the Murray State Racers in Murray, Kentucky and was a key member of the winningest recruiting class in Racer history. As a junior, Daniel was a starter on the Racers' 2011–12 team, which won 23 straight games to start the season and went 31–2 overall. As a senior the following year, Daniel averaged a double-double (13.2 points and 10 rebounds per game) and was named first-team All-Ohio Valley Conference.

== Professional career ==
After the close of his college career, Daniel worked out for several NBA teams, but ultimately was not selected in the 2013 NBA draft. He signed with Pistoia Basket 2000, averaging 8.9 points and 7.5 rebounds for the 2013–14 season.

For the 2014–15 season, Daniel signed with Pallacanestro Varese. On February 12, 2015, he signed with Vanoli Cremona.

On July 19, 2016, Daniel signed with the Israeli team Maccabi Ashdod.

On July 4, 2017, Daniel signed with French club Champagne Châlons-Reims Basket. He posted 8.9 points and 5.6 rebounds per game in Pro A.

Daniel signed with Rethymno Cretan Kings of the Greek Basket League on August 27, 2018. He was released from the Greek team on September 26, 2018, and subsequently joined Peristeri on a two-month contract. He eventually spent the entire 2018–19 season with the Greek club.

Daniel spent the 2019–20 season in Italy for Fortitudo Bologna, averaging 6.4 points and 3.7 rebounds per game. On July 25, 2020, he signed with Iraklis of the Greek Basket League. On August 5, 2021, he signed with Scafati Basket of the Serie A2 Basket.
