= Fortitudo Bologna =

Italian professional basketball club

- 2023–24 Fortitudo Bologna season
- Leagues: Serie A2
- Founded: 1932 (original); 2013 (re-founded)
- History: Fortitudo Bologna (1939–2012); Fortitudo Bologna 103 (2013–present)
- Arena: PalaDozza
- Capacity: 5,570
- Location: Bologna, Italy
- Team colors: White and blue
- President: Stefano Tedeschi
- Team manager: Nicolò Basciano
- Head coach: Attilio Caja
- Ownership: NewCo Sporting Fortitudo S.r.l.
- Championships: 2 Italian Leagues; 1 Italian Cup; 2 Italian Supercups; 1 Italian LNP Cup
- Website: fortitudobologna.it
Home	Away

Fortitudo Pallacanestro Bologna 103, commonly known as Fortitudo Bologna and currently known as Fortitudo Flats Service Bologna for sponsorship reasons, is a professional basketball club based in Bologna, Italy. The team currently plays in the Serie A2, the second division of Italian pro basketball.

== History ==
Fortitudo has for much of its history played second fiddle in its own city to arch rivals Virtus Bologna, with whom it contests the fierce Bologna Derby. Fortitudo won its first major trophy in 1998, winning the Italian Cup.

Fortitudo made the Italian league finals ten consecutive years (1997–2006). After three straight finals losses, Fortitudo won the Serie A for the first time in 2000. Four consecutive finals losses were followed by Fortitudo's second league title in 2005, courtesy of a 3–1 win over Armani Jeans Milano in the finals series when instant replay upheld a Ruben Douglas buzzer beater in Game 4 of the championship series.

In recent years, Fortitudo had been a fixture in the European top-tier Euroleague. Fortitudo's first achievement in European competition was a FIBA Korać Cup final against Jugoplastika in 1977 in their maiden participation. It got to the Euroleague Final four in 1999 (losing in the semifinal against city rivals Kinder Bologna and in third place game against Olympiacos) and the semifinal of the Euroleague playoffs in 2001 (again eliminated by rivals Virtus); then the club lost in the Euroleague final in 2004 to Maccabi Tel Aviv by 44 points. The 2006–07 season saw them change coaches three times as they finished thirteenth (out of eighteen), though they still qualified for the 2007–08 ULEB Cup.

Due to economic irregularities, upon Fortitudo's relegation from the 2008–09 season, the team was not allowed to participate in the 2009–10 Serie A2, restarting from the Serie A dilettanti. After winning that league, Fortitudo was once again excluded from Serie A2 and the club's affiliation to the Italian Federation revoked. As such, Fortitudo was barred from playing in any league, save for youth development leagues.

=== The Rebirth and return to the top flight ===
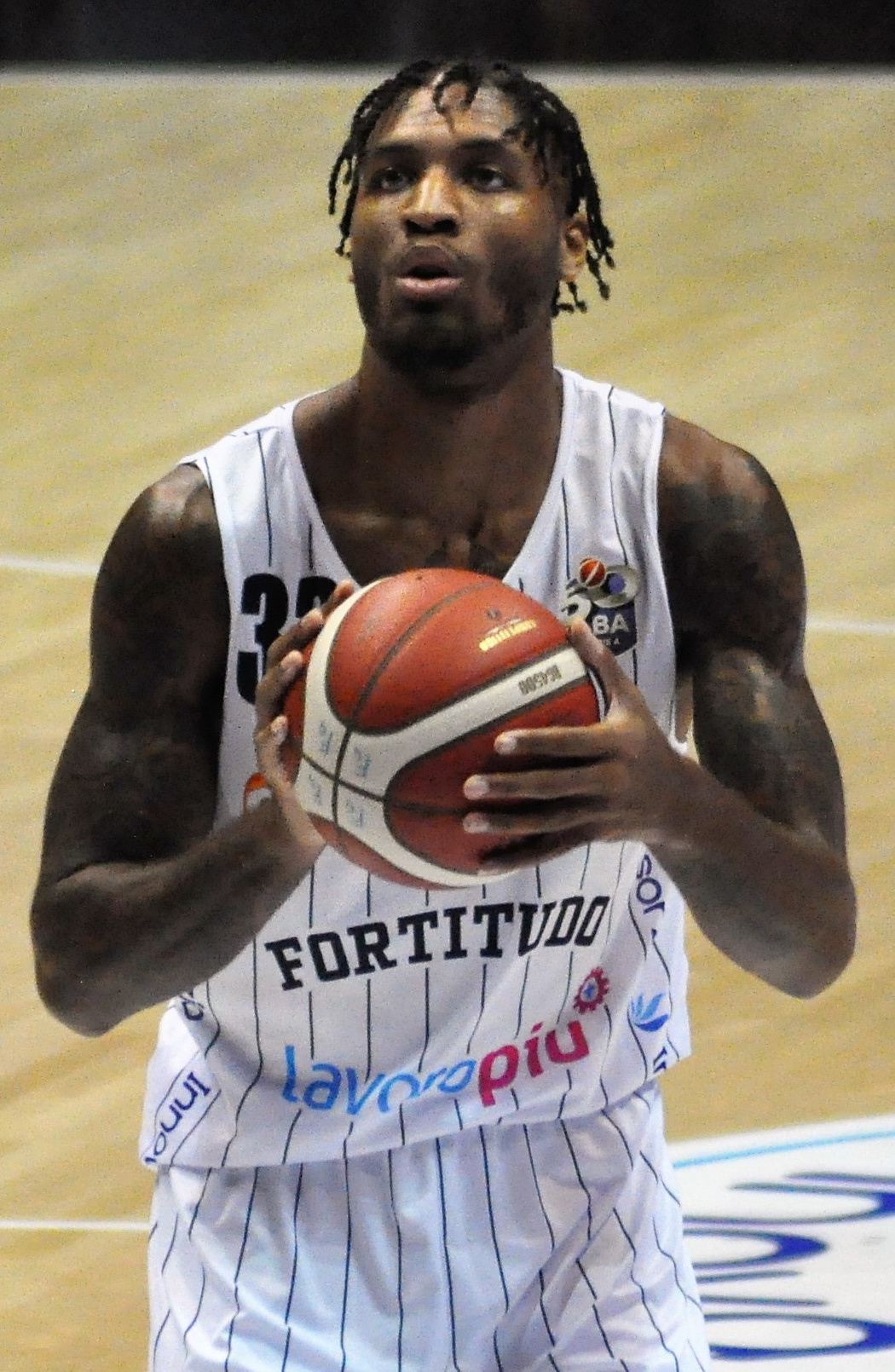
Todd Withers

On 18 June 2013, a group of local entrepreneurs, professionals and fans joined to give life to Fortitudo Pallacanestro Bologna 103, the spiritual successor (with the same fan base such as the Fossa dei Leoni fan group) of the original entity. Starting from the fourth division DNB, Fortitudo climbed to the second division Serie A2 where it played during the 2015–16 season.

After a successful campaign in 2018–19, the club qualified for promotion to Serie A for the first time since its 2009 dissolution. They later qualified to the 2020–21 Basketball Champions League, but they finished last in their group. In the 2021–22 season, they finished in the 15th position to be relegated to Serie A2.

== Honours ==
=== Domestic competitions ===
- Italian League

Winners (2): 1999–00, 2004–05

- Italian Cup

Winners (1): 1997–98

- Italian Supercup

Winners (2): 1998, 2005

=== European competitions ===
- EuroLeague

Runners-up (1): 2003–04
Semifinalists (1): 2000–01
4th place (1): 1998–99
Final Four (2): 1999, 2004

- FIBA Korać Cup

Runners-up (1): 1976–77
Semifinalists (1): 1995–96

=== Other competitions ===
- Copa de Andata Carisbo

Winners (1): 2007

- Via Resa, Italy Invitational Game

Winners (1): 2007

== Top performances in European & Worldwide competitions ==
Season	Achievement	Notes
EuroLeague
1996–97	Quarter-finals	eliminated 2–1 by FC Barcelona, 70–65 (W) in Bologna, 73–75 (L) in Barcelona and 62–87 (L) in Bologna
1997–98	Quarter-finals	eliminated 2–0 by Kinder Bologna, 52–64 (L) in Bologna away, 56–58 (L) in Bologna home
1998–99	Final Four	4th place in Munich, lost to Kinder Bologna 57–62 in the semi-final, lost to Olympiacos 63–74 in the 3rd place game
1999–00	Quarter-finals	eliminated 2–1 by Maccabi Tel Aviv, 65–62 (W) in Tel Aviv, 73–80 (L) in Bologna and 64–79 (L) in Tel Aviv
2000–01	Semi-finals	eliminated 3–0 by Kinder Bologna, 76–103 (L) in Bologna away, 84–92 (L) in Bologna away and 70–74 (L) in Bologna home
2003–04	Final	defeated Montepaschi Siena 103–102 in the semi-final, lost to Maccabi Tel Aviv 74–118 in the final (Tel Aviv)
FIBA Korać Cup
1976–77	Final	lost to Jugoplastika 84–87 in the final (Genoa)
1994–95	Quarter-finals	eliminated by Alba Berlin, 73–77 (L) in Berlin and 80–80 (D) in Bologna
1995–96	Semi-finals	eliminated by Efes Pilsen, 78–102 (L) in Istanbul and 97–91 (W) in Bologna

== Retired numbers ==
Fortitudo Bologna retired numbers
No	Nat.	Player	Position	Tenure	Date retired	Ref.
13	(United States)	Gary Schull	C	1968–1973	2010	

== Players ==
=== Current roster ===
Note: Flags indicate national team eligibility at FIBA-sanctioned events. Players may hold other non-FIBA nationalities not displayed.

Fortitudo Bologna roster
Players
Coaches

Pos.	No.	Nat.	Name	Ht.	Age
SG	4	(Italy)	Aradori, Pietro	1.95 m (6 ft 5 in)	37 – 9 December 1988
C	10	(Italy)	Barbante, Simone	2.11 m (6 ft 11 in)	27 – 29 August 1999
PG	11	(Italy)	Panni, Alessandro	1.85 m (6 ft 1 in)	34 – 27 December 1991
SG	19	(Slovenia)	Vašl, Miha	1.92 m (6 ft 4 in)	34 – 2 March 1992
F/C	20	(Italy)	Candussi, Francesco	2.11 m (6 ft 11 in)	32 – 23 February 1994
PG	21	(Italy)	Fantinelli, Matteo (C)	1.95 m (6 ft 5 in)	32 – 24 November 1993
F	23	(Italy) (Montenegro)	Radonjic, Todor	1.97 m (6 ft 6 in)	29 – 1 April 1997
SF	31	(Italy)	Italiano, Nazzareno	1.98 m (6 ft 6 in)	35 – 15 July 1991
PF	32	(Italy)	Cucci, Valerio	2.02 m (6 ft 8 in)	31 – 19 January 1995

Head coach

- (Italy) Attilio Caja

Assistant coach(es)

- (Italy) Matteo Tasini

Legend

- (C) Team captain
- Injured

- Roster
Updated: 1 May 2025

=== Depth chart ===
Pos.	Starting 5	Bench
C	Francesco Candussi	SImone Barbante
PF	Valerio Cucci	Nazzareno Italiano
SF	Todor Radonjic	Pietro Aradori
SG	Adrian Banks	Miha Vašl
PG	Matteo Fantinelli	Alessandro Panni

(colours: Italian or homegrown players; foreign players; young players)

== Notable players ==
Note: Flags indicate national team eligibility at FIBA-sanctioned events. Players may hold other non-FIBA nationalities not displayed.

Criteria

To appear in this section a player must have either:

- Set a club record or won an individual award while at the club
- Played at least one official international match for their national team at any time
- Played at least one official NBA match at any time.

- (United States) John D. Douglas 4 seasons: '83–'87
- (United States) - (Italy) George Bucci 5 seasons: '85–'90
- (Italy) Andrea Dallamora 8 seasons: '86–'94
- (Spain) - (United States) Wallace Bryant 1 season: '87–'88
- (Italy) Daniele Albertazzi 6 seasons: '87–'93
- (Italy) Moris Masetti 2 seasons: '87–'89
- (United States) Bill Garnett 1 season: '87–'88
- (United States) Artis Gilmore 1 season: '88–'89
- (United States) Vincent Askew 1 season: '88–'89
- (United States) Gene Banks 1 season: '88–'89
- (United States) Chris McNealy 1 season: '89–'90
- (United States) Dave Feitl 1 season: '89–'90
- (United States) Pete Myers 2 seasons: '90–'92
- (United States) Cedrick Hordges 1 season: '90–'91
- (Lithuania) Valdemaras Chomičius 1 season: '90–'91
- (Slovenia) Teoman Alibegović 2 seasons: '91–'93
- (United States) Shaun Vandiver 1 season: '91–'92
- (United States) Dallas Comegys 2 seasons: '92–'94
- (Italy) Corrado Fumagalli 2 seasons: '92–'94
- (Italy) Dan Gay 8 seasons: '93–'00, '06–'07
- (Italy) Vincenzo Esposito 2 seasons: '93–'95
- (Federal Republic of Yugoslavia) Aleksandar Đorđević 2 seasons: '94–'96
- (Italy) Carlton Myers 6 seasons: '95–'01
- (Italy) Alessandro Frosini 3 seasons: '94–'97
- (United States) Mike Brown 1 season: '95–'96
- (United States) Conrad McRae 1 season: '96–'97
- (United States) Eric Murdock 1 season: '96–'97
- (Italy) Gregor Fučka 5 seasons: '97–'02
- (Italy) Giacomo Galanda 5 seasons: '97–'98, '99–'03
- (Italy) Roberto Chiacig 2 seasons: '97–'99
- (United States) David Rivers 1 season: '97–'98
- (United States) Dominique Wilkins 1 season: '97–'98
- (Italy) Gianluca Basile 7 seasons: '98–'05
- (Federal Republic of Yugoslavia) Marko Jarić 2 seasons: '98–'00
- (Lithuania) Artūras Karnišovas 2 seasons: '98–'00
- (Croatia) Damir Mulaomerović 1 season: '98–'99
- (United States) Vinny Del Negro 1 season: '98–'99
- (United States) George Rusinak 1 seasons: '00'01
- (United States) Anthony Bowie 1 season: '00–'01
- (United States) Eddie Gill1 season: '00–'01
- (Lithuania) Eurelijus Žukauskas 1 season: '00–'01
- (France) Vassil Evtimov 2 seasons: '01–'02, '06–'07
- (Croatia) Emilio Kovačić 2 seasons: '01–'03
- (United States) John Celestand 1 season: '01–'02
- (United States) Anthony Goldwire 1 season: '01–'02
- (United States) Dan McClintock 1 season: '01–'02
- (Slovenia) Marko Milič 1 season: '01–'02
- (United States) Rumeal Robinson 1 season: '01–'02
- (Federal Republic of Yugoslavia) Zoran Savić 1 season: '01–'02
- (Italy) Stefano Mancinelli 9 seasons: '01–'09
- (Italy) Gianmarco Pozzecco 3 seasons: '02–'05
- (Argentina) Carlos Delfino 3 seasons: '02–'04,'19
- (United States) A. J. Guyton 2 seasons: '02–'04
- (Czech Republic) Luboš Bartoň 1 season: '02–'03
- (Federal Republic of Yugoslavia) Vlado Šćepanović 1 season: '02–'03
- (Croatia) Mate Skelin 1 season: '02–'03
- (Croatia) Davor Marcelić 1 season: '02–'03
- (Italy) Marco Belinelli 4 seasons: '03–'07
- (Slovenia) Erazem Lorbek 3 seasons: '03–'06
- (Slovenia) Matjaž Smodiš 2 seasons: '03–'05
- (Federal Republic of Yugoslavia) Miloš Vujanić 2 seasons: '03–'05
- (Finland) Hanno Möttölä 1 season: '03–'04
- (Croatia) Dalibor Bagarić 4 seasons: '04–'06, '07–'09
- (United States) Amal McCaskill 1 season: '04–'05
- (United States) Jean-Paul Afif 1 season: '04–'05
- (United States) Ruben Douglas 1 season: '04–'05
- (United States) Nate Green 1 season: '04–'05
- (Slovenia) Sani Bečirovič 1 season: '05–'06
- (France) Yakhouba Diawara 1 season: '05–'06
- (United States) Kiwane Garris 1 season: '05–'06
- (United States) Travis Watson 1 season: '05–'06
- (United States) - (Israel) David Bluthenthal 1 season: '06–'07
- (France) Alain Digbeu 1 season: '06–'07
- (United States) Tyus Edney 1 season: '06–'07
- (Slovenia) Goran Jurak 1 season: '06–'07
- (France) Jérôme Moïso 1 season: '06–'07
- (United States) Moochie Norris 1 season: '06–'07
- (United States) Preston Shumpert 1 season: '06–'07
- (Latvia) Kristaps Janičenoks 1 season: '07–'08
- (United States) Earl Barron 1 season: '08
- (Brazil) Marcelinho Huertas 1 season: '08–'09
- (United Kingdom) Kieron Achara 1 season: '08–'09
- (United States) Jamont Gordon 1 season: '08–'09
- (Slovenia) Uroš Slokar 1 season: '08–'09
- (United States) Joseph Forte 1 season: '08–'09
- (United States) James Thomas 3 seasons: '06–'09
- (Democratic Republic of the Congo) Eric Mavungu 1 seasons: '06
- (United States) Qyntel Woods 1 season: '08–'09
- (United States) D. J. Strawberry 1 season: '08–'09
- (Greece) Lazaros Papadopoulos 1 season: '08–'09
- (Italy) Davide Lamma 8 seasons: '93–'94, '94–'95, '98, '07–'08, '08–'09, '09–'10, '10–'11, '14–'15
- (Italy) Marco Carraretto 1 season: '15–'16
- (Italy) Stefano Mancinelli 1 season: '16–present
- (Albania) Çelis Taflaj 1 season: '23–'24

=== Players at the NBA draft ===
^{#}	Denotes player who has never appeared in an NBA regular-season or playoff game

Position	Player	Year	Round	Pick	Drafted by
SG	(Federal Republic of Yugoslavia) Marko Jarić	2000	1st round	30th	Los Angeles Clippers
SF/SG	(Argentina) Carlos Delfino	2003	1st round	25th	Detroit Pistons
PF/C	(Slovenia) Erazem Lorbek^{#}	2005	2nd round	46th	Indiana Pacers
SG/SF	(Italy) Marco Belinelli	2007	1st round	18th	Golden State Warriors
SG/SF	(Italy) Gabriele Procida	2022	2nd round	36th	Portland Trail Blazers

== Head coaches ==
- (Italy) Beppe Lamberti (1966–1973)
- (Italy) Dido Guerrieri (1973–1974)
- (Italy) Alberto Bucci (1974)
- (Socialist Federal Republic of Yugoslavia) Aza Nikolić (1974–1976)
- (United States) John McMillen (1976–1980)
- (Italy) Mauro Di Vincenzo (1980–1981)
- (Italy) Dodo Rusconi (1981–1983)
- (United States) (Italy) Rudy D'Amico (1983)
- (Italy) Francesco Zucchini and Andrea Sassoli (1983–1984)
- (Italy) Andrea Sassoli (1984–1988)
- (Italy) Mauro Di Vincenzo (1988–1990)
- (Italy) Stefano Pillastrini (1990-1992)
- (Italy) Lino Bruni
- (Italy) Marco Calamai
- (Italy) Dario Bellandi
- (Italy) Sergio Scariolo (1993-1996)
- (Italy) Valerio Bianchini (1996-1998)
- (Croatia) Petar Skansi (1998-1999)
- (Italy) Carlo Recalcati (1999-2001)
- (Italy) Matteo Boniciolli (2001-2002)
- (Croatia) Jasmin Repeša (2002-2006)
- (Italy) Fabrizio Frates (2006)
- (Turkey) Ergin Ataman (2006-2007)
- (Italy) Massimiliano Oldoini / (United States) (Italy) Dan Gay (2007)
- (Italy) Andrea Mazzon (2007-2008)
- (Serbia) (Greece) Dragan Šakota (2008)
- (Italy) Cesare Pancotto (2008-2009)
- (Italy) Alessandro Finelli
- (Italy) Antonio Tinti
- (Italy) Federico Politi
- (Italy) Claudio Vandoni
- (Italy) Matteo Boniciolli (2015-2018)
- (Italy) Gianmarco Pozzecco (2018)
- (Italy) Antimo Martino (2018-2020, 2021-2022)
- (Italy) Romeo Sacchetti (2020)
- (Italy) Luca Dalmonte (2020-21, 2022-2023)
- (Italy) Attilio Caja (2023-)

== Sponsorship names ==
Throughout the years, due to sponsorship, the club has been known as :

- Cassera Bologna (1966–68)
- Eldorado Bologna (1968–71)
- Alco Bologna (1971–78)
- Mercury Bologna (1978–80)
- I&B Bologna (1980–81)
- Lattesole Bologna (1981–83)
- Yoga Bologna (1983–88)
- Arimo Bologna (1988–90)
- Aprimatic Bologna (1990–91)
- Mangiaebevi Bologna (1991–93)
- Filodoro Bologna (1993–95)
- Teamsystem Bologna (1995–99)
- Paf Wennington Bologna (1999–01)
- Skipper Bologna (2001–04)
- Climamio Bologna (2004–07)
- UPIM Bologna [Domestically] (2007–08)
  - Beghelli Bologna [European competition] (2007–08)
- GMAC Bologna [Domestically] (2008–09)
  - Fortitudo Bologna [European competition] (2008–09)
- Amori Bologna (2009–10)
- Tulipano Impianti Bologna (2013–14)
- Eternedile Bologna (2014–16)
- Contatto Bologna (2016–17)
- Consultinvest Bologna (2017–18)
- Lavoropiù Fortitudo Bologna (2018–19)
- Fortitudo Pompea Bologna (2019–20)
- Lavoropiù Fortitudo Bologna (2020–21)
- Fortitudo Kiğılı Bologna (2021–2023)
- Fortitudo Flats Service Bologna (2023–present)
