= 2020–21 Virtus Bologna season =

Italian basketball club season

Virtus Bologna
2020–21 season
- Owner: Massimo Zanetti
- President: Giuseppe Sermasi
- Head coach: Aleksandar Đorđević
- Arena: Segafredo Arena
- LBA: 3rd of 15
- Playoffs: Winners
- EuroCup: Semifinals
- Italian Cup: Quarterfinals
- Supercup: Runners-up

The 2020–21 season is Virtus Bologna's 92nd in existence and the club's 4th consecutive season in the top flight of Italian basketball.

== Overview ==
In the season 2019–20, Virtus Bologna aimed to return to the highest level of the European Basketball. However, the season was hit by the coronavirus pandemic that compelled the federation to suspend and later cancel the competition without assigning the title to anyone. Virtus Bologna ended the championship in 1st position, but the title was not assigned. After a few weeks, also EuroCup season ended, where Bologna had reached the quarter-finals.

In May 2020, Virtus signed Amar Alibegović, a young power forward from Virtus Roma and of the most talented young players of the championship, while in June, the club signed Amedeo Tessitori, a center of the national team from Treviso Basket, and Awudu Abass from Leonessa Brescia; Abass is a member of the national team and one of the most prominent Italian small forwards. The club completed the roster with Josh Adams, a point guard from Unicaja Málaga.

== Kit ==
Supplier: Macron / Sponsor: Segafredo

Home	Away

== Players ==
=== Current roster ===
Virtus Segafredo Bologna roster
Players
Coaches

Pos.	No.	Nat.	Name	Ht.	Wt.	Age
C	0	(Italy)	Tessitori, Amedeo	2.08 m (6 ft 10 in)	97 kg (214 lb)	31 – 7 October 1994
PG	1	(Italy)	Deri, Lorenzo	1.88 m (6 ft 2 in)	85 kg (187 lb)	25 – 16 May 2001
G/F	3	(Italy)	Belinelli, Marco	1.96 m (6 ft 5 in)	100 kg (220 lb)	40 – 25 March 1986
PG	6	(Italy)	Pajola, Alessandro	1.94 m (6 ft 4 in)	95 kg (209 lb)	26 – 9 November 1999
PF	7	(Bosnia and Herzegovina)	Alibegović, Amar	2.06 m (6 ft 9 in)	109 kg (240 lb)	31 – 31 March 1995
PG	9	(Serbia)	Marković, Stefan	1.97 m (6 ft 6 in)	98 kg (216 lb)	38 – 25 April 1988
PF	11	(Italy)	Ricci, Giampaolo (C)	2.02 m (6 ft 8 in)	102 kg (225 lb)	34 – 27 September 1991
PG	14	(United States)	Adams, Josh	1.88 m (6 ft 2 in)	86 kg (190 lb)	32 – 16 November 1993
F/C	32	(United States)	Hunter, Vince	2.03 m (6 ft 8 in)	98 kg (216 lb)	32 – 5 August 1994
SF	34	(United States)	Weems, Kyle	1.98 m (6 ft 6 in)	100 kg (220 lb)	37 – 23 August 1989
SF	35	(Serbia)	Nikolić, Stefan	2.03 m (6 ft 8 in)	95 kg (209 lb)	29 – 29 June 1997
G	44	(Serbia)	Teodosić, Miloš	1.96 m (6 ft 5 in)	89 kg (196 lb)	39 – 19 March 1987
C	45	(United States)	Gamble, Julian	2.08 m (6 ft 10 in)	114 kg (251 lb)	37 – 15 September 1989
SF	55	(Italy)	Abass, Awudu	1.98 m (6 ft 6 in)	100 kg (220 lb)	33 – 27 January 1993

Head coach

- (Serbia) Aleksandar Đorđević

Assistant coach(es)

- (Croatia) Goran Bjedov
- (Italy) Cristian Fedrigo
- (Italy) Mattia Largo

Legend

- (C) Team captain
- Injured

- Roster
Updated: 11 June 2021

Note: Flags indicate national team eligibility at FIBA-sanctioned events. Players may hold other non-FIBA nationalities not displayed.

=== Depth chart ===
Pos.	Starting 5	Bench 1	Bench 2	Bench 3
C	Julian Gamble	Vince Hunter	Amedeo Tessitori
PF	Giampaolo Ricci	Amar Alibegović	Stefan Nikolić
SF	Kyle Weems	Awudu Abass
SG	Miloš Teodosić	Marco Belinelli
PG	Stefan Marković	Josh Adams	Alessandro Pajola

6+6 format (colours: Italian or homegrown players; foreign players; young players)

=== Squad changes ===
==== In ====
No.	Pos.	Nat.	Name	Age	Moving from		Type	Ends	Transfer fee	Date	Source
7	PF	(Bosnia and Herzegovina) (Italy)	Amar Alibegović	25	Virtus Roma	(Italy)	3 years	June 2023	Free	27 May 2020	
0	C	(Italy)	Amedeo Tessitori	25	Universo Treviso Basket	(Italy)	2 years	June 2022	Free	5 June 2020	
3	SF	(Italy)	Awudu Abass	27	Basket Brescia Leonessa	(Italy)	2 years	June 2022	Free	15 June 2020	
14	PG	(United States)	Josh Adams	26	Unicaja Málaga	(Spain)	1+1 year	June 2021 + 2022	Free	20 July 2020	
3	G/F	(Italy)	Marco Belinelli	34	San Antonio Spurs	(United States)	3 years	June 2023	Free	26 November 2020	

1. In players: Players who signed after the beginning of the season

==== Out ====
No.	Pos.	Nat.	Name	Age	Moving to		Type	Transfer fee	Date	Source
0	SG	(United States)	Frank Gaines	29	Bnei Herzliya	(Israel)	End of contract	Free	1 July 2020	
2	G/F	(United States)	Devyn Marble	27	Astana	(Kazakhstan)	End of contract	Free	1 July 2020	
16	C	(Argentina) (Italy)	Marcos Delía	28	Pallacanestro Trieste	(Italy)	End of contract	Free	1 July 2020	
25	SG	(Italy)	David Cournooh	29	Vanoli Cremona	(Italy)	End of contract	Free	1 July 2020	
8	PF	(Italy)	Filippo Baldi Rossi	28	Reggio Emilia	(Italy)	Mutual consent	Undisclosed	15 July 2020	

==== Confirmed ====
No.	Pos.	Nat.	Name	Age	Moving from		Type	Ends	Transfer fee	Date	Source
6	PG	(Italy)	Alessandro Pajola	20	youth team		5 + 4	June 2025	Youth system	2015–16	
35	SF	(Serbia) (Italy)	Stefan Nikolić	23	Amici Pallacanestro Udinese	(Italy)	2 years	June 2021	Free	11 June 2019	
11	PF	(Italy)	Giampaolo Ricci	28	Vanoli Cremona	(Italy)	2 years	June 2021	Free	13 June 2019	
44	PG	(Serbia)	Miloš Teodosić	33	Los Angeles Clippers	(United States)	3 year	June 2022	Free	13 July 2019	
34	SF	(United States)	Kyle Weems	30	Tofaş S.K.	(Turkey)	2 years	June 2021	Free	20 July 2019	
45	C	(United States)	Julian Gamble	30	Nanterre 92	(France)	2 years	June 2021	Free	22 July 2019	
32	F/C	(United States)	Vince Hunter	25	AEK Athens	(Greece)	2 years	June 2021	Free	22 July 2019	
9	PG	(Serbia)	Stefan Marković	32	Khimki	(Russia)	2 years	June 2021	Free	2 August 2019	

==== Coach ====
Nat.	Name	Age.	Previous team		Type	Ends	Date	Source
(Serbia)	Aleksandar Đorđević	52	Bayern Munich	(Germany)	2 years	June 2021	11 March 2019	

== Competitions ==
=== Supercup ===
Pos	Team	Pld	W	L	PF	PA	PD	Qualification
1	Segafredo Virtus Bologna	6	5	1	490	428	+62	Advance to Final Four
2	UnaHotels Reggio Emilia	6	3	3	479	477	+2	
3	Lavoropiù Fortitudo Bologna	6	3	3	506	496	+10	
4	Vanoli Cremona	6	1	5	408	482	−74	

Source: LegaBasket Serie A
Rules for classification: All points scored in extra period(s) were not counted in the standings, nor for any tie-break situation.

==== Final Four ====
18 September 2019 Semifinal	Banco di Sardegna Sassari	76–88	Segafredo Virtus Bologna	Bologna
20:45 (CEST)	Scoring by quarter: 24–19, 18–21, 17–22, 17–26
Eurosport	Pts: Bilan 24; Rebs: Bilan 13; Asts: Spissu 6 PIR: Bilan 37	Boxscore	Pts: Abass, Teodosić 13; Rebs: Gamble 8 Asts: Teodosić 6 PIR: Abass 16	Arena: Segafredo Arena; Referees: Tolga Sahin, Valerio Grigioni, Denis Quarta

20 September 2019 Final	AX Armani Exchange Milano	75–68	Segafredo Virtus Bologna	Bologna
18:00 (CEST)	Scoring by quarter: 21–16, 24–17, 8–18, 22–17
Nove, Eurosport	Pts: Datome 17; Rebs: Datome 6 Asts: Rodríguez 4 PIR: Datome 19	Boxscore	Pts: Alibegović 13; Rebs: Alibegović, Gamble 8 Asts: Teodosić 8 PIR: Gamble 21	Arena: Segafredo Arena; Referees: Carmelo Lo Guzzo, Manuel Mazzoni, Andrea Bongiorni

=== Italian Cup ===
Bologna qualified to the 2021 Italian Basketball Cup by ending the first half of the LBA season in the 4th position. They played the quarterfinal against the 5th ranking Umana Reyer Venezia.

11 February 2021 Quarterfinals	Segafredo Virtus Bologna	82–89	Umana Reyer Venezia	Assago (Milan)
20:45	Scoring by quarter: 16-23, 22-18, 23-24, 21-24
Rai Sport, Eurosport	Pts: Teodosić 15; Rebs: Hunter 7 Asts: Teodosić 6 PIR: Teodosić 19	Boxscore	Pts: Bramos 23; Rebs: Bramos 13; Asts: De Nicolao 5 PIR: Bramos 31	Arena: Mediolanum Forum; Referees: Tolga Sahin, Carmelo Lo Guzzo, Guido Giovannetti

=== Serie A ===
==== Regular season ====
Pos	Team	Pld	W	L	PF	PA	PD	Qualification
1	AX Armani Exchange Milano	28	22	6	2385	2099	+286	Qualification to Playoffs
2	Happy Casa Brindisi	28	20	8	2395	2212	+183	Qualification to Playoffs
3	Virtus Segafredo Bologna	28	19	9	2397	2168	+229	Qualification to Playoffs
4	Umana Reyer Venezia	28	19	9	2257	2142	+115	Qualification to Playoffs
5	Banco di Sardegna Sassari	28	18	10	2527	2437	+90	Qualification to Playoffs

Updated to match(es) played on 10 May 2021. Source: LBA

==== Playoffs ====
===== Quarterfinals =====
13 May 2021 Game 1	Segafredo Virtus Bologna	91–72 (Series: 1-0)	De' Longhi Treviso	Bologna
19:00 (CET)	Scoring by quarter: 27–17, 21–26, 24–18, 19–11
Eurosport 2, Eurosport Player	Pts: Gamble 17; Rebs: Ricci 8 Asts: Teodosić 9 PIR: Gamble 24	Boxscore	Pts: Logan 17; Rebs: Mekowulu 8 Asts: Sokołowski 4 PIR: Mekowulu 19	Arena: Segafredo Arena; Referees: Tolga Sahin, Mark Bartoli, Alessandro Nicolini

14 May 2021 Game 2	Segafredo Virtus Bologna	88–83 (Series: 2-0)	De' Longhi Treviso	Bologna
20:45 (CET)	Scoring by quarter: 16–18, 25–15, 22–21, 25–29
Rai Sport, Eurosport Player	Pts: Belinelli 24; Rebs: Hunter 12; Asts: Teodosić 8 PIR: Teodosić 26	Boxscore	Pts: Mekowulu 23; Rebs: Sokołowski 8 Asts: Sokołowski 7 PIR: Mekowulu 35	Arena: Segafredo Arena; Referees: Manuel Mazzoni, Guido Giovannetti, Giulio Pepponi

17 May 2021 Game 3	De' Longhi Treviso	100–105(OT) (Series: 0-3)	Segafredo Virtus Bologna	Villorba (Treviso)
20:45 (CET)	Scoring by quarter: 25–24, 36–22, 9–22, 23–25, Overtime: 7–12
Rai Sport, Eurosport Player	Pts: Logan 25; Rebs: Mekowulu 7 Asts: Logan, Russell 6 PIR: Logan 29	Boxscore	Pts: Pajola 25; Rebs: Ricci 9 Asts: Pajola, Teodosić 7 PIR: Pajola 29	Arena: Palaverde; Referees: Roberto Begnis, Denny Borgioni, Denis Quarta

===== Semifinals =====
23 May 2021 Game 1	Happy Casa Brindisi	66–73 (Series: 0-1)	Segafredo Virtus Bologna	Brindisi
20:45 (CET)	Scoring by quarter: 16–17, 13–15, 21–21, 16–20
Rai Sport, Eurosport 2	Pts: Willis 15; Rebs: Willis 13; Asts: Thompson 4 PIR: Willis 30	Boxscore	Pts: Teodosić 24; Rebs: Gamble 7 Asts: Teodosić 4 PIR: Teodosić 20	Arena: PalaPentassuglia; Referees: Carmelo Paternicò, Beniamino Manuel Attard, Fabrizio Paglialunga

25 May 2021 Game 2	Happy Casa Brindisi	74–83 (Series: 0-2)	Segafredo Virtus Bologna	Brindisi
20:45 (CET)	Scoring by quarter: 18–19, 20–20, 18–21, 18–23
Rai Sport, Eurosport 2	Pts: Harrison 16; Rebs: Willis 8 Asts: Thompson 5 PIR: Willis 16	Boxscore	Pts: Belinelli, Teodosić 16; Rebs: Ricci 11; Asts: Marković 5 PIR: Ricci 20	Arena: PalaPentassuglia; Referees: Tolga Sahin, Carmelo Lo Guzzo, Lorenzo Baldini

2 June 2021 Game 3	Segafredo Virtus Bologna	78–75 (Series: 3-0)	Happy Casa Brindisi	Bologna
19:00 (CET)	Scoring by quarter: 13–17, 24–23, 18–13, 23–22
Rai Sport, Eurosport 2	Pts: Teodosić 29; Rebs: Weems 7 Asts: Teodosić, Marković 5 PIR: Teodosić 29	Boxscore	Pts: Harrison 15; Rebs: Harrison, Willis 9 Asts: Thompson 5 PIR: Harrison 21	Arena: Segafredo Arena; Referees: Manuel Mazzoni, Mark Bartoli, Denny Borgioni

==== Finals ====
5 June 2021 Game 1	AX Armani Exchange Milano	77–83 (Series: 0-1)	Segafredo Virtus Bologna	Assago (Milan)
20:45 (CET)	Scoring by quarter: 19–23, 20–25, 14–19, 24–16
Rai Sport, Eurosport 2	Pts: LeDay, Rodríguez 16; Rebs: Hines 10; Asts: LeDay 4 PIR: LeDay 19	Boxscore	Pts: Teodosić 19; Rebs: Marković 6 Asts: Teodosić 7 PIR: Teodosić 18	Arena: Mediolanum Forum; Referees: Tolga Sahin, Carmelo Lo Guzzo, Gu

7 June 2021 Game 2	AX Armani Exchange Milano	72–83 (Series: 0-2)	Segafredo Virtus Bologna	Assago (Milan)
20:45 (CET)	Scoring by quarter: 21-16, 20-24, 18-18, 13-25
Rai Sport, Eurosport 2	Pts: Shields 16; Rebs: Delaney, Datome 6 Asts: Delaney 4 PIR: Delaney 15	Boxscore	Pts: Teodosić 21; Rebs: four players 4 Asts: Teodosić 5 PIR: Teodosić 21	Arena: Mediolanum Forum; Referees: Carmelo Paternicò, Beniamino Manuel Attard, Fabrizio Paglialunga

9 June 2021 Game 3	Segafredo Virtus Bologna	76–58 (Series: 3-0)	AX Armani Exchange Milano	Bologna
20:45 (CET)	Scoring by quarter: 17-16, 20-18, 15-18, 24-6
Rai Sport, Eurosport 2	Pts: Weems 23; Rebs: Weems 10; Asts: Teodosić 6 PIR: Weems 26	Boxscore	Pts: Shields, Datome 14; Rebs: Shields, Datome, Punter 5 Asts: Rodríguez 3 PIR: Shields 12	Arena: Segafredo Arena; Referees: Roberto Begnis, Lorenzo Baldini, Mark Bartoli

11 June 2021 Game 4	Segafredo Virtus Bologna	73–62 (Series: 4-0)	AX Armani Exchange Milano	Bologna
19:00 (CET)	Scoring by quarter: 19-24, 22-19, 14-8, 18-11
Rai Sport, Eurosport 2	Pts: Belinelli 15; Rebs: Pajola, Abass 5 Asts: Teodosić 6 PIR: Pajola 18	Boxscore	Pts: Shields 16; Rebs: Shields 10; Asts: Rodríguez 3 PIR: Shields 28	Arena: Segafredo Arena; Referees: Manuel Mazzoni, Alessandro Martolini, Denny Borgioni

Starters:			Pts	Reb	Ast
PG	9	(Serbia) Stefan Marković	7	4	1
SG	55	(Italy) Awudu Abass	2	5	0
SF	34	(United States) Kyle Weems	14	4	1
PF	11	(Italy) Giampaolo Ricci	5	3	0
C	45	(United States) Julian Gamble	0	3	1
Reserves:					
SG	3	(Italy) Marco Belinelli	15	1	3
PG	6	(Italy) Alessandro Pajola	8	5	4
PF	7	(Bosnia and Herzegovina) Amar Alibegović	6	3	0
SG	14	(United States) Josh Adams	DNP		
C	32	(United States) Vince Hunter	6	3	0
SF	35	(Serbia) Stefan Nikolić	DNP		
PG	44	(Serbia) Miloš Teodosić	10	2	6
Head coach:
(Basketball Federation of Serbia) Aleksandar Đorđević

Segafredo Virtus Bologna	AX Armani Exchange Milano

Bologna	Statistics	Milano
15/38 (39.5%)	2 point field goals	15/31 (48.4%)
12/32 (37.5%)	3 point field goals	5/21 (23.8%)
7/9 (77.8%)	Free throws	17/21 (81.0%)
35	Rebounds	31
16	Assists	12
13	Steals	9
10	Turnovers	20
4	Blocks	4

Starters:			Pts	Reb	Ast
PG	13	(Spain) Sergio Rodríguez	8	4	3
SG	31	(Denmark) Shavon Shields	16	10	2
SF	70	(Italy) Luigi Datome	10	0	1
PF	2	(United States) Zach LeDay	2	5	1
C	42	(United States) Kyle Hines	10	6	2
Reserves:					
SG	0	(United States) Kevin Punter	11	1	0
PF	5	(Serbia) Vladimir Micov	0	2	1
PG	9	(Italy) Riccardo Moraschini	0	0	0
C	19	(Italy) Paul Biligha	0	3	0
PG	20	(Italy) Andrea Cinciarini	5	5	2
PF	32	(Italy) Jeff Brooks	0	0	0
C	81	(Poland) Jakub Wojciechowski	0	0	0
Head coach:
(Italian Basketball Federation) Ettore Messina

LBA Finals MVP
(Serbia) Miloš Teodosić
Game rules
Game played under FIBA rules.

2020–21 LBA Winners

Segafredo Virtus Bologna
16th title

=== Eurocup ===
==== Regular season ====
Pos	Team	Pld	W	L	PF	PA	PD	Qualification
1	(Italy) Virtus Segafredo Bologna	10	10	0	861	745	+116	Advance to Top 16
2	(Russia) Lokomotiv Kuban	10	8	2	910	811	+99	Advance to Top 16
3	(France) AS Monaco	10	6	4	786	724	+62	Advance to Top 16
4	(Spain) MoraBanc Andorra	10	3	7	746	776	−30	Advance to Top 16
5	(Lithuania) Lietkabelis	10	2	8	721	831	−110	
6	(Belgium) Telenet Giants Antwerp	10	1	9	734	871	−137	

Source: EuroCup Basketball
Rules for classification: All points scored in extra period(s) were not counted in the standings, nor for any tie-break situation.

==== Top 16 ====
Pos	Team	Pld	W	L	PF	PA	PD	Qualification
1	(Italy) Virtus Segafredo Bologna	6	6	0	549	470	+79	Advance to quarterfinals
2	(Montenegro) Budućnost VOLI	6	3	3	504	495	+9	Advance to quarterfinals
3	(Slovenia) Cedevita Olimpija	6	3	3	478	486	−8	
4	(France) JL Bourg	6	0	6	473	553	−80	

Source: EuroCup Basketball
Rules for classification: All points scored in extra period(s) were not counted in the standings, nor for any tie-break situation.

==== Playoffs ====
===== Quarterfinals =====
23 March 2021 Game 1	Segafredo Virtus Bologna (Italy)	80–75 (Series: 1-0)	(Spain) Joventut Badalona	Bologna
20:45 (CET)	Scoring by quarter: 20–22, 21–22, 22–19, 17–12
EuroLeague TV, Eurosport Player, DAZN	Pts: Belinelli 24; Rebs: Teodosić 5 Asts: Teodosić 10; PIR: Belinelli 27	Boxscore	Pts: López-Arostegui 20; Rebs: López-Arostegui, Morgan 6 Asts: Bassas 8 PIR: Bassas 19	Arena: Segafredo Arena; Referees: Milivoje Jovčić, Spiros Gkontas, Mykola Ambrosov

26 March 2021 Game 2	Joventut Badalona (Spain)	78–84 (Series: 2-0)	(Italy) Segafredo Virtus Bologna	Badalona
19:00 (CET)	Scoring by quarter: 14–19, 17–24, 23–21, 24–20
EuroLeague TV, Eurosport Player, DAZN	Pts: Bassas 26; Rebs: Tomić 8 Asts: Ribas, Bassas 5 PIR: Bassas 32	Boxscore	Pts: Hunter, Weems 18; Rebs: Hunter, Gamble 5 Asts: Marković 8 PIR: Hunter 16	Arena: Palau Olimpic De Badalona; Referees: Damir Javor, Tomasz Trawicki, Hugues Thépénier

===== Semifinals =====
6 April 2021 Game 1	Segafredo Virtus Bologna (Italy)	80–76 (Series: 1-0)	(Russia) UNICS Kazan	Bologna
20:45 (CET)	Scoring by quarter: 23–19, 21–17, 12–20, 24–20
EuroLeague TV, Eurosport Player	Pts: Teodosić 27; Rebs: Hunter 7 Asts: Teodosić 5 PIR: Teodosić 34	Boxscore	Pts: Smith 22; Rebs: Brown, Morgan 5 Asts: Canaan 4 PIR: Smith 21	Arena: Segafredo Arena; Referees: Oļegs Latiševs, Milan Nedović, Luka Kardum

9 April 2021 Game 2	UNICS Kazan (Russia)	85–81 (Series: 1-1)	(Italy) Segafredo Virtus Bologna	Kazan
18:00 (CET)	Scoring by quarter: 18–14, 29–23, 24–24, 14–20
EuroLeague TV, Eurosport Player	Pts: Canaan 19; Rebs: White 9 Asts: Theodore 6 PIR: Canaan 23	Boxscore	Pts: Belinelli 33; Rebs: Ricci, Hunter, Weems 5 Asts: Teodosić 9 PIR: Belinelli 36	Arena: Basket-Hall Kazan; Referees: Ilija Belošević, Milos Koljensic, Hüseyin Çelik

14 April 2021 Game 3	Segafredo Virtus Bologna (Italy)	100–107 (Series: 1-2)	(Russia) UNICS Kazan	Bologna
20:45 (CET)	Scoring by quarter: 21–21, 27–25, 19–27, 33–34
EuroLeague TV, Eurosport Player	Pts: Teodosić 25; Rebs: Ricci, Weems 4 Asts: Teodosić 9 PIR: Teodosić 29	Boxscore	Pts: Smith 24; Rebs: Brown 8 Asts: Theodore 7 PIR: Brown 31	Arena: Segafredo Arena; Referees: Sreten Radović, Gytis Vilius, Saulius Racys

== See also ==
- 2020–21 LBA season
- 2020–21 EuroCup Basketball
- 2021 Italian Basketball Cup
- 2020 Italian Basketball Supercup
