= 2019–20 Virtus Bologna season =

Italian basketball club season

Virtus Bologna
2019–20 season
- President: Giuseppe Sermasi
- Head coach: Aleksandar Đorđević
- Arena: PalaDozza; Virtus Arena
- LBA: season cancelled (1st)
- EuroCup: season cancelled (quarter finals)
- Coppa Italia: Quarter finals
- Intercontinental Cup: Runners-up

The 2019–20 season is Virtus Bologna's 91st in existence and the club's 3rd consecutive season in the top flight of Italian basketball.

== Overview ==
In the season 2019-20 Virtus Bologna aims to return to the highest level of the European Basketball. Despite having won the 2018-19 edition of the Basketball Champions League, Bologna decides to compete in the 2019–20 EuroCup. Followed a controversy that involved all together the club, the Italian Basketball Federation (FIP) and FIBA, in which the latter tried to convince Bologna to take part to the 2019–20 Basketball Champions League.

Bologna is aggressive also during the summer transfers, hiring top players like Miloš Teodosić and Stefan Marković and with the ambition of playing in the next year EuroLeague edition.

The season starts incredibly well, confirming the ambitious plans of the team, with a 10 games winning streak in the Serie A and the qualification to the Top 16 of the EuroCup Basketball. Bologna ends the first half of the season (16th round) on top of the standings, gaining the unofficial title of winter champions.

Unfortunately, though, the 2019-20 season was hit by the coronavirus pandemic that compelled the federation to suspend and later cancel the competition without assigning the title to anyone. Virtus Bologna ended the championship in 1st position. Followed also the early termination of the EuroCup season where Bologna had reached the quarter finals.

== Kit ==
Supplier: Macron / Sponsor: Segafredo

Home	Away

== Players ==
=== Roster ===
Segafredo Virtus Bologna roster
Players
Coaches

Pos.	No.	Nat.	Name	Ht.	Wt.	Age
SG	0	(United States)	Gaines, Frank	1.91 m (6 ft 3 in)	88 kg (194 lb)	36 – 7 July 1990
PG	1	(Italy)	Deri, Lorenzo	1.88 m (6 ft 2 in)	74 kg (163 lb)	25 – 16 May 2001
G/F	2	(United States)	Marble, Devyn	1.98 m (6 ft 6 in)	91 kg (201 lb)	33 – 21 September 1992
PG	6	(Italy)	Pajola, Alessandro	1.94 m (6 ft 4 in)	83 kg (183 lb)	26 – 9 November 1999
F/C	8	(Italy)	Baldi Rossi, Filippo (C)	2.07 m (6 ft 9 in)	97 kg (214 lb)	34 – 26 October 1991
PG	9	(Serbia)	Marković, Stefan	1.99 m (6 ft 6 in)	98 kg (216 lb)	38 – 25 April 1988
PF	11	(Italy)	Ricci, Giampaolo	2.01 m (6 ft 7 in)	102 kg (225 lb)	34 – 27 September 1991
F/C	12	(Estonia)	Peterson, Mait	2.07 m (6 ft 9 in)	95 kg (209 lb)	24 – 19 March 2002
C	16	(Argentina)	Delía, Marcos	2.11 m (6 ft 11 in)	111 kg (245 lb)	34 – 8 April 1992
G	25	(Italy)	Cournooh, David	1.87 m (6 ft 2 in)	83 kg (183 lb)	36 – 28 July 1990
F/C	32	(United States)	Hunter, Vince	2.03 m (6 ft 8 in)	98 kg (216 lb)	32 – 5 August 1994
SF	34	(United States)	Weems, Kyle	1.98 m (6 ft 6 in)	100 kg (220 lb)	37 – 23 August 1989
SF	35	(Serbia)	Nikolić, Stefan	2.03 m (6 ft 8 in)	95 kg (209 lb)	29 – 29 June 1997
PG	44	(Serbia)	Teodosić, Miloš	1.96 m (6 ft 5 in)	89 kg (196 lb)	39 – 19 March 1987
C	45	(United States)	Gamble, Julian	2.08 m (6 ft 10 in)	114 kg (251 lb)	37 – 15 September 1989

Head coach

- (Serbia) Aleksandar Đorđević

Assistant coach(es)

- (Croatia) Goran Bjedov
- (Italy) Cristian Fedrigo
- (Italy) Mattia Largo

Legend

- (C) Team captain
- Injured

- Roster
Updated: 5 March 2020

Note: Flags indicate national team eligibility at FIBA-sanctioned events. Players may hold other non-FIBA nationalities not displayed.

=== Depth chart ===
Pos.	Starting 5	Bench 1	Bench 2	Bench 3
C	Julian Gamble	Vince Hunter	Marcos Delía
PF	Giampaolo Ricci	Filippo Baldi Rossi	Mait Peterson
SF	Kyle Weems	Devyn Marble	Stefan Nikolić
SG	Miloš Teodosić	Frank Gaines	Manuele Solaroli
PG	Stefan Marković	David Cournooh	Alessandro Pajola	Lorenzo Deri

6+6 format (colours: Italian or homegrown players; foreign players; young players)

=== Squad changes ===
==== In ====
No.	Pos.	Nat.	Name	Age	Moving from		Type	Ends	Transfer fee	Date	Source
35	SF	(Serbia) (Italy)	Stefan Nikolić	21	Amici Pallacanestro Udinese	(Italy)	2 years	June 2021	Free	11 June 2019	
11	PF	(Italy)	Giampaolo Ricci	27	Vanoli Cremona	(Italy)	2 years	June 2021	Free	13 June 2019	
44	PG	(Serbia)	Miloš Teodosić	32	Los Angeles Clippers	(United States)	3 year	June 2022	Free	13 July 2019	
0	SG	(United States)	Frank Gaines	29	Pallacanestro Cantù	(Italy)	1 year	June 2020	Free	18 July 2019	
34	SF	(United States)	Kyle Weems	29	Tofaş S.K.	(Turkey)	2 years	June 2021	Free	20 July 2019	
45	C	(United States)	Julian Gamble	29	Nanterre 92	(France)	2 years	June 2021	Free	22 July 2019	
32	F/C	(United States)	Vince Hunter	24	AEK Athens	(Greece)	2 years	June 2021	Free	22 July 2019	
9	PG	(Serbia)	Stefan Marković	31	Khimki	(Russia)	2 years	June 2021	Free	2 August 2019	
16	F/C	(Argentina) (Italy)	Marcos Delía	27	Fuerza Regia de Monterrey	(Mexico)	2 years	June 2021	Undisclosed	3 October 2019	
2	G/F	(United States)	Devyn Marble	27	Santa Cruz Warriors	(United States)	1 year	June 2020	Free	22 January 2020	

==== Out ====
No.	Pos.	Nat.	Name	Age	Moving to		Type	Transfer fee	Date	Source
0	SG	(United States)	Kevin Punter	26	Olympiacos	(Greece)	end of contract	Free	1 July 2019	
1	SF	(United States)	Kelvin Martin	29	New Basket Brindisi	(Italy)	end of contract	Free	1 July 2019	
2	C	(Angola)	Yanick Moreira	27	Peristeri	(Greece)	end of contract	Free	1 July 2019	
7	PG	(United States)	Tony Taylor	28	Pınar Karşıyaka	(Turkey)	end of contract	Free	1 July 2019	
9	PG	(Italy)	Alessandro Cappelletti	23	Basket Torino	(Italy)	end of contract	Free	1 July 2019	
11	C	(Serbia) (Canada)	Dejan Kravić	28	Obradoiro CAB	(Spain)	end of contract	Free	1 July 2019	
15	PG	(United States)	Mario Chalmers	34	AEK Athens	(Greece)	end of contract	Free	1 July 2019	
23	C	(Italy)	Matteo Berti	20	Poderosa Montegranaro	(Italy)	end of contract	Free	1 July 2019	
24	PF	(France)	Amath M'Baye	29	Pınar Karşıyaka	(Turkey)	end of contract	Free	1 July 2019	
41	C	(United States)	Brian Qvale	30	Shimane Susanoo Magic	(Japan)	mutual consent	Undisclosed	26 July 2019	
21	G/F	(Italy)	Pietro Aradori	30	Fortitudo Bologna	(Italy)	mutual consent	Undisclosed	12 August 2019	

==== Confirmed ====
No.	Pos.	Nat.	Name	Age	Moving from		Type	Ends	Transfer fee	Date	Source
6	PG	(Italy)	Alessandro Pajola	19	youth team			June 2001	Youth system		
8	PF	(Italy)	Filippo Baldi Rossi	27	Aquila Basket Trento	(Italy)	2 + 2 years	June 2021	Undisclosed	30 November 2017	
25	SG	(Italy)	David Cournooh	29	Pallacanestro Cantù	(Italy)	2 years	June 2020	Free	30 June 2018	

==== Coach ====
Nat.	Name	Age.	Previous team		Type	Ends	Date	Source
(Serbia)	Aleksandar Đorđević	52	Bayern Munich	(Germany)	2	2021	11 March 2019	

== Competitions ==
=== Serie A ===
Pos	Team	Pld	W	L	PF	PA	PD	Qualification or relegation
1	Segafredo Virtus Bologna	20	18	2	1719	1500	+219	Qualification for EuroCup
2	Banco di Sardegna Sassari	20	15	5	1703	1506	+197	Qualification for Champions League
3	Germani Basket Brescia	21	14	7	1707	1554	+153	Qualification for EuroCup
4	AX Armani Exchange Milano	21	14	7	1687	1555	+132	Already qualified for EuroLeague
5	Happy Casa Brindisi	21	13	8	1776	1696	+80	Qualification for Champions League

Updated to match(es) played on 9 February 2020. Source: LBA

=== EuroCup ===
==== Regular season ====
Pos	Team	Pld	W	L	PF	PA	PD	Qualification
1	(Italy) Segafredo Virtus Bologna	10	8	2	846	791	+55	Advance to Top 16
2	(Spain) MoraBanc Andorra	10	7	3	853	766	+87	Advance to Top 16
3	(France) Monaco	10	6	4	763	732	+31	Advance to Top 16
4	(Greece) Promitheas	10	6	4	771	751	+20	Advance to Top 16
5	(Israel) Maccabi Rishon LeZion	10	2	8	740	862	−122	
6	(Germany) ratiopharm Ulm	10	1	9	793	864	−71	

Source: EuroCup Basketball
Rules for classification: All points scored in extra period(s) were not counted in the standings, nor for any tie-break situation.

==== Top 16 ====
Pos	Team	Pld	W	L	PF	PA	PD	Qualification
1	(Serbia) Partizan NIS	6	5	1	489	418	+71	Advance to quarterfinals
2	(Italy) Segafredo Virtus Bologna	6	4	2	519	488	+31	Advance to quarterfinals
3	(Turkey) Darüşşafaka Tekfen	6	3	3	458	464	−6	
4	(Italy) Dolomiti Energia Trento	6	0	6	413	509	−96	

Source: EuroCup Basketball
Rules for classification: All points scored in extra period(s) were not counted in the standings, nor for any tie-break situation.

=== FIBA Intercontinental Cup ===
As the winner of the 2018-19 edition of the Basketball Champions League, Virtus Bologna qualified to the 2020 FIBA Intercontinental Cup. They won in the semifinal against the Argentinian team San Lorenzo de Almagro, winner of the 2019 edition of the FIBA Americas League and lost the final against the hosting team Iberostar Tenerife.

7 February 2019 Semifinal	Segafredo Virtus Bologna (Italy)	75–57	(Argentina) San Lorenzo de Almagro	San Cristóbal de La Laguna, Tenerife, Spain
18:30 (UTC)	Scoring by quarter: 23-10, 8-17, 21-15, 23-15
YouTube	Pts: Hunter 16; Rebs: Ricci 10; Asts: Marble, Marković 4 PIR: Ricci 19	Boxscore	Pts: Tucker 16; Rebs: Fjellerup 5 Asts: Vildoza, Batista 3 PIR: Batista 13	Arena: Santiago Martín Arena; Referees: Jorge Vazquez (PUR), Matthew Leigh Kallio (CAN), Martins Kozlovskis (LAT)

9 February 2019 Final	Segafredo Virtus Bologna (Italy)	72–80	(Spain) Iberostar Tenerife	San Cristóbal de La Laguna, Tenerife, Spain
19:00 (UTC)	Scoring by quarter: 11-16, 21-26, 22-25, 18-13
YouTube	Pts: Teodosić 15; Rebs: Ricci 8 Asts: Teodosić 8 PIR: Teodosić 19	Boxscore	Pts: Huertas 23; Rebs: Shermadini, White 7 Asts: Lundberg, Huertas, Salin 3 PIR: Huertas, White 16	Arena: Santiago Martín Arena; Referees: Jorge Vazquez (PUR), Aleksandar Glisić (SRB), Matthew Leigh Kallio (CAN)

=== Italian Cup ===
Bologna qualified to the 2020 Italian Basketball Cup having ended the first half of the season in 1st place. They lost the first match in the quarter finals against Umana Reyer Venezia.

13 February 2020 Quarter finals	Segafredo Virtus Bologna	81–82(OT)	Umana Reyer Venezia	Pesaro
20:45	Scoring by quarter: 11-21, 21-16, 15-13, 21-18, Overtime: 13-14
Eurosport, Rai Sport	Pts: Marković 18; Rebs: Hunter 10; Asts: Teodosić 6 PIR: Weems 20	Boxscore	Pts: Tonut 16; Rebs: Vidmar 11; Asts: De Nicolao 3 PIR: Vidmar 17	Arena: Adriatic Arena
