= 2021 LBA Playoffs =

Tournament details
- Country: Italy
- Dates: 13 May–11 June
- Teams: 8
- Defending champions: Reyer Venezia

Final positions
- Champions: Virtus Segafredo Bologna
- Runners-up: AX Armani Exchange Milano
- Semifinalists: Umana Reyer Venezia; Happy Casa Brindisi

Tournament statistics
- Matches played: 24

The 2021 LBA Playoffs, officially known as the 2021 LBA Playoff UnipolSai, was the postseason tournament of the 2020–21 LBA season, which began on 26 September 2021. The Playoffs started on May 13, 2021, with the match Milano–Trento.

Umana Reyer Venezia were the defending champions, from the season 2018–19 as the 2019–20 season was suppressed because of the COVID-19 pandemic.

== Qualified teams ==
The eight first qualified teams after the end of the regular season were qualified to the playoffs.

Pos	Team	Pld	W	L	PF	PA	PD	Qualification
1	AX Armani Exchange Milano	28	22	6	2385	2099	+286	Seeded teams
2	Happy Casa Brindisi	28	20	8	2395	2212	+183	Seeded teams
3	Virtus Segafredo Bologna	28	19	9	2397	2168	+229	Seeded teams
4	Umana Reyer Venezia	28	19	9	2257	2142	+115	Seeded teams
5	Banco di Sardegna Sassari	28	18	10	2527	2437	+90	Non-seeded teams
6	De' Longhi Treviso	28	14	14	2353	2468	−115	Non-seeded teams
7	Allianz Pallacanestro Trieste	28	14	14	2253	2249	+4	Non-seeded teams
8	Dolomiti Energia Trento	28	13	15	2191	2228	−37	Non-seeded teams

Updated to match(es) played on 10 May 2021. Source: LBA

== Bracket ==
Quarterfinals
AX Armani Exchange Milano	88	93	74
Dolomiti Energia Trento	62	79	65
Umana Reyer Venezia	92	83	60	73	93
Banco di Sardegna Sassari	91	78	75	86	91
Happy Casa Brindisi	85	86	79
Allianz Pallacanestro Trieste	64	54	77
Virtus Segafredo Bologna	91	88	105
De' Longhi Treviso	72	83	100

Semifinals
AX Armani Exchange Milano	81	99	93
Umana Reyer Venezia	79	65	83
Happy Casa Brindisi	66	74	75
Virtus Segafredo Bologna	73	83	78

Finals
AX Armani Exchange Milano	77	72	58	62
Virtus Segafredo Bologna	83	83	76	73

== Quarterfinals ==
All times were in Central European Summer Time (UTC+02:00)

The quarterfinals were played in a best of five format.

Team 1	Series	Team 2	Game 1	Game 2	Game 3	Game 4	Game 5
AX Armani Exchange Milano	3–0	Dolomiti Energia Trento	88–62	93–77	74–65		
Umana Reyer Venezia	3–2	Banco di Sardegna Sassari	92–91 (OT)	83–78	60–75	73–86	93–91
Happy Casa Brindisi	3–0	Allianz Pallacanestro Trieste	85–64	86–54	79–77		
Virtus Segafredo Bologna	3–0	De' Longhi Treviso	91–72	88–83	105–100 (OT)		

=== Game 1 ===
13 May 2021	AX Armani Exchange Milano	88–62 (Series: 1-0)	Dolomiti Energia Trento	Assago (Milan)
17:30 (CET)	Scoring by quarter: 26–20, 23–14, 23–17, 26–11
Rai Sport, Eurosport Player	Pts: Shields 16; Rebs: Moraschini, Hines 7 Asts: Rodríguez, Shields, Hines 4 PIR: Hines 23	Boxscore	Pts: Browne 16; Rebs: Williams 6 Asts: Sanders 5 PIR: Browne 17	Arena: Mediolanum Forum; Referees: Manuel Mazzoni, Andrea Bongiorni, Gianluca Capotorto

13 May 2021	Umana Reyer Venezia	92–91(OT) (Series: 1-0)	Banco di Sardegna Sassari	Mestre (Venice)
18:00 (CET)	Scoring by quarter: 14–24, 21–19, 27–20, 19–18, Overtime: 11–10
Rai Sport, Eurosport Player	Pts: Chappell 19; Rebs: Stone 8 Asts: De Nicolao 6 PIR: Stone 23	Boxscore	Pts: Bilan 19; Rebs: Bilan 11; Asts: Spissu 4 PIR: Bilan 34	Arena: Taliercio; Referees: Saverio Lanzarini, Alessandro Vicino, Fabrizio Paglialunga

13 May 2021	Happy Casa Brindisi	85–64 (Series: 1-0)	Allianz Pallacanestro Trieste	Brindisi
20:45 (CET)	Scoring by quarter: 21–18, 22–10, 14–17, 28–19
Rai Sport, Eurosport Player	Pts: Harrison 16; Rebs: Perkins 10; Asts: Thompson 6 PIR: Willis 21	Boxscore	Pts: Doyle 12; Rebs: Alviti 6 Asts: Da Ros, Doyle 2 PIR: Upson 19	Arena: PalaPentassuglia; Referees: Carmelo Lo Guzzo, Denis Quarta, Christian Borgo

13 May 2021	Virtus Segafredo Bologna	91–72 (Series: 1-0)	De' Longhi Treviso	Bologna
19:00 (CET)	Scoring by quarter: 27–17, 21–26, 24–18, 19–11
Eurosport 2, Eurosport Player	Pts: Gamble 17; Rebs: Ricci 8 Asts: Teodosić 9 PIR: Gamble 24	Boxscore	Pts: Logan 17; Rebs: Mekowulu 8 Asts: Sokołowski 4 PIR: Mekowulu 19	Arena: Segafredo Arena; Referees: Tolga Sahin, Mark Bartoli, Alessandro Nicolini

=== Game 2 ===
14 May 2021	AX Armani Exchange Milano	93–79 (Series: 2-0)	Dolomiti Energia Trento	Assago (Milan)
19:00 (CET)	Scoring by quarter: 23–21, 26–14, 24–18, 20–26
Eurosport 2, Eurosport Player	Pts: LeDay 19; Rebs: Biligha 6 Asts: Rodríguez 7 PIR: Moraschini, Rodríguez 21	Boxscore	Pts: Morgan 17; Rebs: Williams 8 Asts: Browne 6 PIR: Browne, Morgan, Williams 18	Arena: Mediolanum Forum; Referees: Roberto Begnis, Lorenzo Baldini, Martino Galasso

14 May 2021	Umana Reyer Venezia	83–78 (Series: 2-0)	Banco di Sardegna Sassari	Mestre (Venice)
18:00 (CET)	Scoring by quarter: 21–24, 16–23, 20–7, 26–24
Rai Sport, Eurosport Player	Pts: Tonut 25; Rebs: Watt 7 Asts: Stone, Watt 4 PIR: Tonut 27	Boxscore	Pts: Happ 14; Rebs: Burnell, Bendžius, Gentile 9 Asts: Spissu 5 PIR: Happ 20	Arena: Taliercio; Referees: Carmelo Paternicò, Beniamino Manuel Attard, Denny Borgioni

14 May 2021	Happy Casa Brindisi	86–54 (Series: 2-0)	Allianz Pallacanestro Trieste	Brindisi
20:45 (CET)	Scoring by quarter: 25–11, 15–14, 28–16, 18–13
Eurosport Player	Pts: Perkins 17; Rebs: Krubally 10; Asts: Harrison 7 PIR: Perkins 20	Boxscore	Pts: Alviti 14; Rebs: Upson, Delía, Henry 4 Asts: Fernández, Cavaliero 3 PIR: Alviti 14	Arena: PalaPentassuglia; Referees: Michele Rossi, Alessandro Martolini, Giacomo Dori

14 May 2021	Virtus Segafredo Bologna	88–83 (Series: 2-0)	De' Longhi Treviso	Bologna
20:45 (CET)	Scoring by quarter: 16–18, 25–15, 22–21, 25–29
Rai Sport, Eurosport Player	Pts: Belinelli 24; Rebs: Hunter 12; Asts: Teodosić 8 PIR: Teodosić 26	Boxscore	Pts: Mekowulu 23; Rebs: Sokołowski 8 Asts: Sokołowski 7 PIR: Mekowulu 35	Arena: Segafredo Arena; Referees: Manuel Mazzoni, Guido Giovannetti, Giulio Pepponi

=== Game 3 ===
16 May 2021	Dolomiti Energia Trento	65–74 (Series: 0-3)	AX Armani Exchange Milano	Trento
20:45 (CET)	Scoring by quarter: 16–20, 13–16, 16–16, 20–22
Eurosport 2, Eurosport Player	Pts: Williams 16; Rebs: Martin, Williams 8 Asts: Sanders 4 PIR: Martin, Williams 17	Boxscore	Pts: Punter 14; Rebs: Moraschini 9 Asts: Rodríguez, Delaney 4 PIR: Moraschini 24	Arena: BLM Group Arena; Referees: Saverio Lanzarini, Mark Bartoli, Christian Borgo

16 May 2021	Banco di Sardegna Sassari	75–60 (Series: 1-2)	Umana Reyer Venezia	Sassari
20:45 (CET)	Scoring by quarter: 22–12, 24–14, 15–16, 14–18
Rai Sport, Eurosport Player	Pts: Spissu, Bendžius 13; Rebs: Bilan 7 Asts: Spissu, Burnell 4 PIR: Spissu, Happ 15	Boxscore	Pts: Tonut 17; Rebs: Stone, Daye 7 Asts: Tonut, Daye 3 PIR: Daye 18	Arena: PalaSerradimigni; Referees: Tolga Sahin, Carmelo Lo Guzzo, Andrea Bongiorni

17 May 2021	Allianz Pallacanestro Trieste	77–79 (Series: 0-3)	Happy Casa Brindisi	Trieste
19:00 (CET)	Scoring by quarter: 20–25, 21–22, 18–16, 18–16
Eurosport 2, Eurosport Player	Pts: Henry 22; Rebs: Upson, Delía, Henry 7 Asts: Delía 3 PIR: Henry 24	Boxscore	Pts: Perkins 19; Rebs: Willis 8 Asts: Thompson 5 PIR: Willis 30	Arena: Allianz Dome; Referees: Carmelo Paternicò, Alessandro Vicino, Alessandro Nicolini

17 May 2021	De' Longhi Treviso	100–105(OT) (Series: 0-3)	Virtus Segafredo Bologna	Villorba (Treviso)
20:45 (CET)	Scoring by quarter: 25–24, 36–22, 9–22, 23–25, Overtime: 7–12
Rai Sport, Eurosport Player	Pts: Logan 25; Rebs: Mekowulu 7 Asts: Logan, Russell 6 PIR: Logan 29	Boxscore	Pts: Pajola 25; Rebs: Ricci 9 Asts: Pajola, Teodosić 7 PIR: Pajola 29	Arena: Palaverde; Referees: Roberto Begnis, Denny Borgioni, Denis Quarta

=== Game 4 ===
18 May 2021	Banco di Sardegna Sassari	86–73 (Series: 2-2)	Umana Reyer Venezia	Sassari
20:45 (CET)	Scoring by quarter: 20–6, 11–29, 28–24, 27–14
Rai Sport, Eurosport 2	Pts: Bendžius 25; Rebs: Burnell 8 Asts: Spissu 5 PIR: Bendžius 27	Boxscore	Pts: Jerrells 14; Rebs: Chappell 9 Asts: Chappell 5 PIR: Chappell 19	Arena: PalaSerradimigni; Referees: Michele Rossi, Alessandro Martolini, Guido Giovannetti

=== Game 5 ===
20 May 2021	Umana Reyer Venezia	93–91 (Series: 3-2)	Banco di Sardegna Sassari	Mestre (Venice)
21:00 (CET)	Scoring by quarter: 24–23, 12–26, 27–28, 30–14
Rai Sport, Eurosport Player	Pts: Daye 20; Rebs: Tonut 7 Asts: Tonut 4 PIR: Tonut, Daye 22	Boxscore	Pts: Bilan 26; Rebs: Bendžius 9 Asts: Spissu, Gentile 5 PIR: Bilan 27	Arena: Taliercio; Referees: Manuel Mazzoni, Mark Bartoli, Denny Borgioni

== Semifinals ==
The semifinals were played in a best of five format.

Team 1	Series	Team 2	Game 1	Game 2	Game 3
AX Armani Exchange Milano	3–0	Umana Reyer Venezia	81–79	99–65	93–83
Happy Casa Brindisi	0–3	Virtus Segafredo Bologna	66–73	74–83	75–78

=== Game 1 ===
22 May 2021	AX Armani Exchange Milano	81–79 (Series: 1-0)	Umana Reyer Venezia	Assago (Milan)
21:00 (CET)	Scoring by quarter: 20–13, 22–25, 22–17, 17–24
Rai Sport, Eurosport 2	Pts: Shields 25; Rebs: Hines 9 Asts: Hines 4 PIR: Shields 30	Boxscore	Pts: Tonut 18; Rebs: Watt 10; Asts: Daye 3 PIR: Daye, Watt 22	Arena: Mediolanum Forum; Referees: Saverio Lanzarini, Alessandro Vicino, Andrea Bongiorni

23 May 2021	Happy Casa Brindisi	66–73 (Series: 0-1)	Virtus Segafredo Bologna	Brindisi
20:45 (CET)	Scoring by quarter: 16–17, 13–15, 21–21, 16–20
Rai Sport, Eurosport 2	Pts: Willis 15; Rebs: Willis 13; Asts: Thompson 4 PIR: Willis 30	Boxscore	Pts: Teodosić 24; Rebs: Gamble 7 Asts: Teodosić 4 PIR: Teodosić 20	Arena: PalaPentassuglia; Referees: Carmelo Paternicò, Beniamino Manuel Attard, Fabrizio Paglialunga

=== Game 2 ===
24 May 2021	AX Armani Exchange Milano	99–65 (Series: 2-0)	Umana Reyer Venezia	Assago (Milan)
20:45 (CET)	Scoring by quarter: 23–7, 31–22, 23–23, 22–13
Rai Sport, Eurosport 2	Pts: Delaney 20; Rebs: Moraschini 7 Asts: Rodríguez 7 PIR: Rodríguez 24	Boxscore	Pts: Watt 15; Rebs: Watt 7 Asts: De Nicolao 3 PIR: Watt 26	Arena: Mediolanum Forum; Referees: Michele Rossi, Guido Giovannetti, Denis Quarta

25 May 2021	Happy Casa Brindisi	74–83 (Series: 0-2)	Virtus Segafredo Bologna	Brindisi
20:45 (CET)	Scoring by quarter: 18–19, 20–20, 18–21, 18–23
Rai Sport, Eurosport 2	Pts: Harrison 16; Rebs: Willis 8 Asts: Thompson 5 PIR: Willis 16	Boxscore	Pts: Belinelli, Teodosić 16; Rebs: Ricci 11; Asts: Marković 5 PIR: Ricci 20	Arena: PalaPentassuglia; Referees: Tolga Sahin, Carmelo Lo Guzzo, Lorenzo Baldini

=== Game 3 ===
2 June 2021	Umana Reyer Venezia	83–93 (Series: 3-0)	AX Armani Exchange Milano	Mestre (Venice)
21:00 (CET)	Scoring by quarter: 21–21, 17–17, 14–24, 31–31
Rai Sport, Eurosport 2	Pts: Daye 22; Rebs: Stone, Tonut, Daye 5 Asts: Stone, Tonut, De Nicolao 2 PIR: Daye 23	Boxscore	Pts: Punter 19; Rebs: LeDay 7 Asts: Rodríguez, Delaney 5 PIR: Punter, Hines 21	Arena: Taliercio; Referees: Roberto Begnis, Alessandro Martolini, Lorenzo Baldini

2 June 2021	Virtus Segafredo Bologna	78–75 (Series: 3-0)	Happy Casa Brindisi	Bologna
19:00 (CET)	Scoring by quarter: 13–17, 24–23, 18–13, 23–22
Rai Sport, Eurosport 2	Pts: Teodosić 29; Rebs: Weems 7 Asts: Teodosić, Marković 5 PIR: Teodosić 29	Boxscore	Pts: Harrison 15; Rebs: Harrison, Willis 9 Asts: Thompson 5 PIR: Harrison 21	Arena: Segafredo Arena; Referees: Manuel Mazzoni, Mark Bartoli, Denny Borgioni

== Finals ==
The finals were played in a best of seven format.

Team 1	Series	Team 2	Game 1	Game 2	Game 3	Game 4
AX Armani Exchange Milano	0–4	Virtus Segafredo Bologna	77–83	72–83	58–76	62–73

=== Game 1 ===
5 June 2021	AX Armani Exchange Milano	77–83 (Series: 0-1)	Virtus Segafredo Bologna	Assago (Milan)
20:45 (CET)	Scoring by quarter: 19–23, 20–25, 14–19, 24–16
Rai Sport, Eurosport 2	Pts: LeDay, Rodríguez 16; Rebs: Hines 10; Asts: LeDay 4 PIR: LeDay 19	Boxscore	Pts: Teodosić 19; Rebs: Marković 6 Asts: Teodosić 7 PIR: Teodosić 18	Arena: Mediolanum Forum; Referees: Tolga Sahin, Carmelo Lo Guzzo, Guido Giovannetti

Starters:			Pts	Reb	Ast
PG	23	(United States) Malcolm Delaney	1	2	1
SG	31	(Denmark) Shavon Shields	7	3	2
SF	70	(Italy) Luigi Datome	15	1	1
PF	2	(United States) Zach LeDay	16	5	4
C	42	(United States) Kyle Hines	7	10	3
Reserves:					
SG	0	(United States) Kevin Punter	12	2	1
SF	9	(Italy) Riccardo Moraschini	0	1	0
PG	13	(Spain) Sergio Rodríguez	16	1	3
C	19	(Italy) Paul Biligha	1	3	0
PG	20	(Italy) Andrea Cinciarini	DNP		
PF	32	(Italy) Jeff Brooks	2	2	0
C	81	(Poland) Jakub Wojciechowski	DNP		
Head coach:
(Italian Basketball Federation) Ettore Messina

AX Armani Exchange Milano	Virtus Segafredo Bologna

Starters:			Pts	Reb	Ast
PG	9	(Serbia) Stefan Marković	7	6	4
SG	3	(Italy) Marco Belinelli	9	3	3
SF	34	(United States) Kyle Weems	15	4	0
PF	11	(Italy) Giampaolo Ricci	8	1	2
C	45	(United States) Julian Gamble	8	1	2
Reserves:					
PG	6	(Italy) Alessandro Pajola	0	1	4
PF	7	(Bosnia and Herzegovina) Amar Alibegović	7	5	0
SG	14	(United States) Josh Adams	DNP		
C	32	(United States) Vince Hunter	2	4	1
SF	35	(Serbia) Stefan Nikolić	DNP		
PG	44	(Serbia) Miloš Teodosić	19	1	7
SF	55	(Italy) Awudu Abass	8	5	0
Head coach:
(Basketball Federation of Serbia) Aleksandar Đorđević

=== Game 2 ===
7 June 2021	AX Armani Exchange Milano	72–83 (Series: 0-2)	Virtus Segafredo Bologna	Assago (Milan)
20:45 (CET)	Scoring by quarter: 21-16, 20-24, 18-18, 13-25
Rai Sport, Eurosport 2	Pts: Shields 16; Rebs: Delaney, Datome 6 Asts: Delaney 4 PIR: Delaney 15	Boxscore	Pts: Teodosić 21; Rebs: four players 4 Asts: Teodosić 5 PIR: Teodosić 21	Arena: Mediolanum Forum; Referees: Carmelo Paternicò, Beniamino Manuel Attard, Fabrizio Paglialunga

Starters:			Pts	Reb	Ast
PG	23	(United States) Malcolm Delaney	10	6	4
SG	31	(Denmark) Shavon Shields	16	2	1
SF	70	(Italy) Luigi Datome	6	6	1
PF	2	(United States) Zach LeDay	11	0	1
C	42	(United States) Kyle Hines	4	4	0
Reserves:					
SG	0	(United States) Kevin Punter	12	4	1
SF	9	(Italy) Riccardo Moraschini	0	3	1
PG	13	(Spain) Sergio Rodríguez	13	2	3
C	19	(Italy) Paul Biligha	0	3	1
PG	20	(Italy) Andrea Cinciarini	DNP		
PF	32	(Italy) Jeff Brooks	0	3	0
C	81	(Poland) Jakub Wojciechowski	DNP		
Head coach:
(Italian Basketball Federation) Ettore Messina

AX Armani Exchange Milano	Virtus Segafredo Bologna

Starters:			Pts	Reb	Ast
PG	9	(Serbia) Stefan Marković	3	4	3
SG	55	(Italy) Awudu Abass	0	1	2
SF	34	(United States) Kyle Weems	11	3	1
PF	11	(Italy) Giampaolo Ricci	15	4	0
C	45	(United States) Julian Gamble	4	3	3
Reserves:					
SG	3	(Italy) Marco Belinelli	13	3	1
PG	6	(Italy) Alessandro Pajola	5	2	3
PF	7	(Bosnia and Herzegovina) Amar Alibegović	7	4	0
SG	14	(United States) Josh Adams	DNP		
C	32	(United States) Vince Hunter	4	3	3
SF	35	(Serbia) Stefan Nikolić	DNP		
PG	44	(Serbia) Miloš Teodosić	21	4	5
Head coach:
(Basketball Federation of Serbia) Aleksandar Đorđević

=== Game 3 ===
9 June 2021	Virtus Segafredo Bologna	76–58 (Series: 3-0)	AX Armani Exchange Milano	Bologna
20:45 (CET)	Scoring by quarter: 17-16, 20-18, 15-18, 24-6
Rai Sport, Eurosport 2	Pts: Weems 23; Rebs: Weems 10; Asts: Teodosić 6 PIR: Weems 26	Boxscore	Pts: Shields, Datome 14; Rebs: Shields, Datome, Punter 5 Asts: Rodríguez 3 PIR: Shields 12	Arena: Segafredo Arena; Referees: Roberto Begnis, Lorenzo Baldini, Mark Bartoli

Starters:			Pts	Reb	Ast
PG	9	(Serbia) Stefan Marković	4	4	3
SG	55	(Italy) Awudu Abass	6	2	0
SF	34	(United States) Kyle Weems	23	10	1
PF	11	(Italy) Giampaolo Ricci	3	5	1
C	45	(United States) Julian Gamble	2	7	1
Reserves:					
SG	3	(Italy) Marco Belinelli	7	0	0
PG	6	(Italy) Alessandro Pajola	10	6	1
PF	7	(Bosnia and Herzegovina) Amar Alibegović	5	5	3
SG	14	(United States) Josh Adams	DNP		
C	32	(United States) Vince Hunter	4	1	0
SF	35	(Serbia) Stefan Nikolić	0	0	0
PG	44	(Serbia) Miloš Teodosić	12	4	6
Head coach:
(Basketball Federation of Serbia) Aleksandar Đorđević

Virtus Segafredo Bologna	AX Armani Exchange Milano

Starters:			Pts	Reb	Ast
PG	13	(Spain) Sergio Rodríguez	4	2	3
SG	0	(United States) Kevin Punter	11	5	0
SG	31	(Denmark) Shavon Shields	14	5	2
PF	5	(Serbia) Vladimir Micov	8	3	2
C	15	(United States) Kaleb Tarczewski	0	2	0
Reserves:					
PG	9	(Italy) Riccardo Moraschini	0	0	0
C	19	(Italy) Paul Biligha	0	0	0
PG	20	(Italy) Andrea Cinciarini	DNP		
PF	32	(Italy) Jeff Brooks	3	4	0
C	42	(United States) Kyle Hines	4	4	0
SF	70	(Italy) Luigi Datome	14	5	1
C	81	(Poland) Jakub Wojciechowski	0	0	0
Head coach:
(Italian Basketball Federation) Ettore Messina

=== Game 4 ===
11 June 2021	Virtus Segafredo Bologna	73–62 (Series: 4-0)	AX Armani Exchange Milano	Bologna
19:00 (CET)	Scoring by quarter: 19-24, 22-19, 14-8, 18-11
Rai Sport, Eurosport 2	Pts: Belinelli 15; Rebs: Pajola, Abass 5 Asts: Teodosić 6 PIR: Pajola 18	Boxscore	Pts: Shields 16; Rebs: Shields 10; Asts: Rodríguez 3 PIR: Shields 28	Arena: Segafredo Arena; Referees: Manuel Mazzoni, Alessandro Martolini, Denny Borgioni

Starters:			Pts	Reb	Ast
PG	9	(Serbia) Stefan Marković	7	4	1
SG	55	(Italy) Awudu Abass	2	5	0
SF	34	(United States) Kyle Weems	14	4	1
PF	11	(Italy) Giampaolo Ricci	5	3	0
C	45	(United States) Julian Gamble	0	3	1
Reserves:					
SG	3	(Italy) Marco Belinelli	15	1	3
PG	6	(Italy) Alessandro Pajola	8	5	4
PF	7	(Bosnia and Herzegovina) Amar Alibegović	6	3	0
SG	14	(United States) Josh Adams	DNP		
C	32	(United States) Vince Hunter	6	3	0
SF	35	(Serbia) Stefan Nikolić	DNP		
PG	44	(Serbia) Miloš Teodosić	10	2	6
Head coach:
(Basketball Federation of Serbia) Aleksandar Đorđević

Virtus Segafredo Bologna	AX Armani Exchange Milano

LBA Finals MVP
(Serbia) Miloš Teodosić
Game rules
Game played under FIBA rules.

2020–21 LBA Winners

Virtus Segafredo Bologna
16th title

Starters:			Pts	Reb	Ast
PG	13	(Spain) Sergio Rodríguez	8	4	3
SG	31	(Denmark) Shavon Shields	16	10	2
SF	70	(Italy) Luigi Datome	10	0	1
PF	2	(United States) Zach LeDay	2	5	1
C	42	(United States) Kyle Hines	10	6	2
Reserves:					
SG	0	(United States) Kevin Punter	11	1	0
PF	5	(Serbia) Vladimir Micov	0	2	1
PG	9	(Italy) Riccardo Moraschini	0	0	0
C	19	(Italy) Paul Biligha	0	3	0
PG	20	(Italy) Andrea Cinciarini	5	5	2
PF	32	(Italy) Jeff Brooks	0	0	0
C	81	(Poland) Jakub Wojciechowski	0	0	0
Head coach:
(Italian Basketball Federation) Ettore Messina
