= Amar Alibegović =

Bosnian basketball player (born 1995)

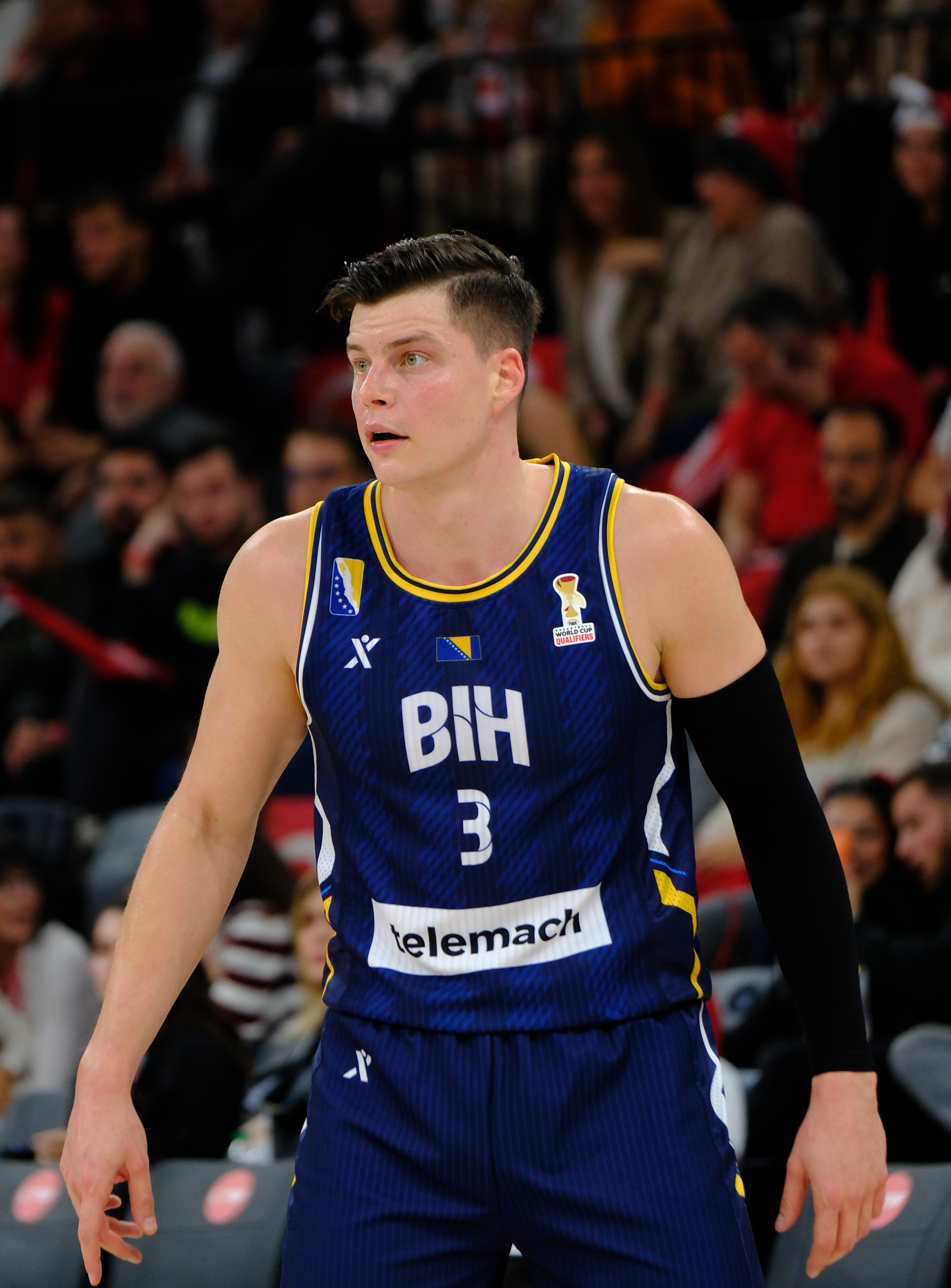
- Alibegović with Bosnia and Herzegovina in 2025

No. 7 – Derthona Basket
- Position: Power forward
- League: Lega Basket Serie A EuroCup

Personal information
- Born: 31 March 1995 (age 31) Corvallis, Oregon, U.S.
- Listed height: 2.06 m (6 ft 9 in)
- Listed weight: 109 kg (240 lb)

Career information
- High school: Istituto Minerva (Rome, Italy)
- College: St. John's (2014–2018)
- NBA draft: 2018: undrafted
- Playing career: 2018–present

Career history
- 2018–2020: Virtus Roma
- 2020–2022: Virtus Bologna
- 2022–2023: Cedevita Olimpija
- 2023–2024: Çağdaş Bodrumspor
- 2024–2025: Trapani Shark
- 2026: Granada
- 2026–present: Derthona Basket

Career highlights
- EuroCup champion (2022); Italian League champion (2021); Italian Supercup winner (2021); Slovenian League champion (2023); Slovenian Cup winner (2023); 2× Italian Serie A2 champion (2019, 2024)

Amar Alibegović (born 31 March 1995) is a Bosnian professional basketball player for Derthona Basket of the Italian Lega Basket Serie A. He is the son of Teoman Alibegović, a former basketball player.

== Professional career ==
=== Virtus Roma (2018–2020) ===
In 2018, after four years with the St. John Red Storm in New York City, Alibegović signed with Virtus Roma in the Serie A2 Basket. At the end of the season, the team was promoted in LBA. In the 2019–20 LBA season, Alibegović scored more than 10 points and collected almost 7 rebounds per game, however, in March 2020, the season ended due to the COVID-19 pandemic which heavily affected the country.

=== Virtus Bologna (2020–2022) ===
On 27 May 2020, he signed with Virtus Bologna, one of the most important teams in the league. After having knocked out 3–0 both Basket Treviso in the quarterfinals and New Basket Brindisi in the semifinals, on 11 June 2021, Virtus defeated 4–0 its historic rival Olimpia Milan in the national finals, winning its 16th national title and the first one after twenty years.

On 21 September 2021, the team won its second Supercup, defeating Olimpia Milano 90–84. Moreover, after having ousted Lietkabelis, Ulm and Valencia in the first three rounds of the playoffs, on 11 May 2022, Virtus defeated Frutti Extra Bursaspor by 80–67 at the Segafredo Arena, winning its first EuroCup and qualifying for the EuroLeague after 14 years. However, despite having ended the regular season at the first place and having ousted 3–0 both Pesaro and Tortona in the first two rounds of playoffs, Virtus was defeated 4–2 in the national finals by Olimpia Milan.

=== Cedevita Olimpija (2022–2023) ===
On 6 July 2022, Alibegović signed a two-year deal with KK Cedevita Olimpija, a Slovenian team from the ABA League and EuroCup.

=== Çağdaş Bodrumspor (2023–2024) ===
On 1 July 2023 he signed with Çağdaş Bodrumspor of the Basketbol Süper Ligi (BSL).

=== Trapani Shark (2024–2025) ===
On 1 April 2024, he signed with Trapani Shark of the Serie A2.

=== Granada (2026) ===
On 3 January 2026, he signed for Covirán Granada of the Liga ACB. He signed a contract until the end of the season.

=== Derthona Basket (2026–present) ===
On 25 September 2026, Alibegović signed a multi-year contract with Derthona Basket of the Italian Lega Basket Serie A and the EuroCup.

== Personal life ==
Alibegović is the son of Teoman Alibegović, a former basketball player. His brothers Mirza and Denis are basketball players as well, like his cousin Luka Garza, American-Bosnian professional basketball player for the Minnesota Timberwolves of the NBA.
