= Aleksandar Đorđević =

Serbian basketball player & coach (born 1967)

Aleksandar Đorđević Александар Ђорђевић
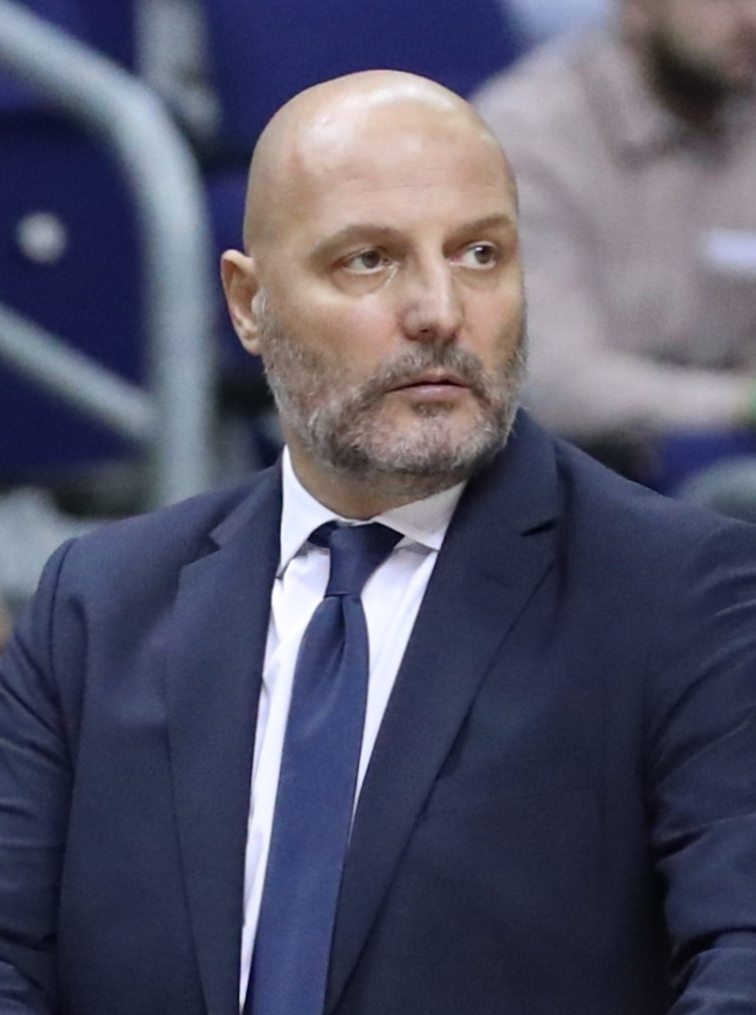
- Đorđević in 2021

Bahçeşehir Koleji
- League: BSL; EuroCup

Personal information
- Born: 26 August 1967 (age 59) Belgrade, SR Serbia, Yugoslavia
- Listed height: 1.88 m (6 ft 2 in)
- Listed weight: 90 kg (198 lb)

Career information
- NBA draft: 1989: undrafted
- Playing career: 1983–2005
- Position: Point guard
- Number: 4, 6, 10, 19, 20
- Coaching career: 2006–present

Career history

Playing
- 1983–1992: Partizan
- 1992–1994: Olimpia Milano
- 1994–1996: Fortitudo Bologna
- 1996: Portland Trail Blazers
- 1996–1999: FC Barcelona
- 1999–2002: Real Madrid
- 2003–2004: Scavolini Pesaro
- 2005: Olimpia Milano

Coaching
- 2006–2007: Olimpia Milano
- 2011–2012: Benetton Treviso
- 2013–2019: Serbia
- 2015–2016: Panathinaikos
- 2016–2018: Bayern Munich
- 2019–2021: Virtus Bologna
- 2021–2022: Fenerbahçe
- 2022–2024: China
- 2026–present: Bahçeşehir Koleji

Career highlights
- As player: EuroLeague champion (1992); 3× FIBA Korać Cup champion (1989, 1993, 1999); FIBA EuroStar (1997); FIBA European Selection Team (1998); FIBA EuroStar 3 Point Contest Champion (1997); 3× Spanish League champion (1997, 1999, 2000); Spanish League All-Star (2001); Liga ACB Free Throw Percentage leader (2002); 3× Italian League All-Star (1992, 1993, 1994); Italian League All-Star Game MVP (1994); Italian League All-Star Game 3 Point Contest Champion (1994); 2× Yugoslav League champion (1987, 1992); 2× Yugoslav Cup winner (1989, 1992); 2× Mister Europa Player of the Year (1994, 1995); EuroBasket MVP (1997); Best Athlete of FR Yugoslavia (1995); FR Yugoslav Sportsman of the Year (1995); 50 Greatest EuroLeague Contributors (2008); As head coach: FIBA Champions League champion (2019); Italian League champion (2021); Turkish League champion (2022); Greek Cup winner (2016); German Cup winner (2018)
- Stats at NBA.com
- Stats at Basketball Reference
Medals
Men's basketball
Representing Yugoslavia
EuroBasket
Gold medal – first place	1991 Italy
Bronze medal – third place	1987 Greece
FIBA U-19 World Cup
Gold medal – first place	1987 Italy	Under-19
FIBA U-18 European Championship
Gold medal – first place	1986 Austria	Under-18
Representing FR Yugoslavia
Summer Olympic Games
Silver medal – second place	1996 Atlanta
FIBA World Cup
Gold medal – first place	1998 Greece
EuroBasket
Gold medal – first place	1995 Greece
Gold medal – first place	1997 Spain
Head Coach for Serbia
Summer Olympic Games
Silver medal – second place	2016 Rio de Janeiro
FIBA World Cup
Silver medal – second place	2014 Spain
EuroBasket
Silver medal – second place	2017 Finland–Israel–Romania–Turkey	Team
Head Coach for China
Asian Games
Bronze medal – third place	2022 Hangzhou

Aleksandar "Saša" Đorđević (Serbian Cyrillic: Александар "Саша" Ђорђевић, pronounced [aleksǎːndar sâʃa dʑǒːrdʑeʋitɕ]; born 26 August 1967) is a Serbian professional basketball coach and former player. He is currently the head coach for the Bahçeşehir Koleji of the Turkish Basketbol Süper Ligi (BSL) and the EuroCup. During his playing career, he was listed as a 1.88 m (6'2") 90 kg (198 lb.) point guard.

During his pro club playing career, Đorđević, along with his teammate Predrag Danilović, helped to lead Partizan to its first EuroLeague title in 1992, while he earned an All-Final Four Team selection in the process. He was twice named the Mister Europa Player of the Year, in both 1994 and 1995. He also played in a total of 108 games, while representing the senior national teams of SFR Yugoslavia, and later FR Yugoslavia.

As a player, he won gold medals at the 1991 EuroBasket, the 1995 EuroBasket, the 1997 EuroBasket, where he was named the Most Valuable Player, and the 1998 FIBA World Championship. In 1995, Đorđević received the Golden Badge award for the Best Athlete of FR Yugoslavia, and the Yugoslav Olympic Committee declared him the Sportsman of the Year. In 2008, Đorđević was named one of the 50 Greatest EuroLeague Contributors.

Đorđević is most well-known for two famous game-winning shots that he hit during his playing career. He hit the game-winning shot of the 1992 EuroLeague Final, and the game-winning shot of the 1997 EuroBasket game between FR Yugoslavia and Croatia. He is the only person that has won medals at the Summer Olympic Games, the FIBA World Cup, and the FIBA EuroBasket, as both a player and as a head coach.

== Early life ==
Born in 1967 into a sporting family, both of Aleksandar's parents—retired basketball player father Bratislav a.k.a. Bata and mother Milijana—worked as primary school physical education teachers. His father simultaneously pursued basketball coaching, an activity that would eventually turn into a notable professional career after the summer 1971 marquee appointment as KK Crvena zvezda's head coach and immediate success leading the team to the Yugoslav League title, won in a dramatic neutral-venue, single-game playoff versus Jugoplastika Split that went into overtime.

The family lived in New Belgrade where young Aleksandar a.k.a. Saša was immersed in basketball from an early age. Following in young Saša's footsteps, his younger brother Miloš would also end up pursuing basketball, getting as far as youth categories within the KK Partizan system.

== Playing career ==
=== Partizan Belgrade (1983–1992) ===
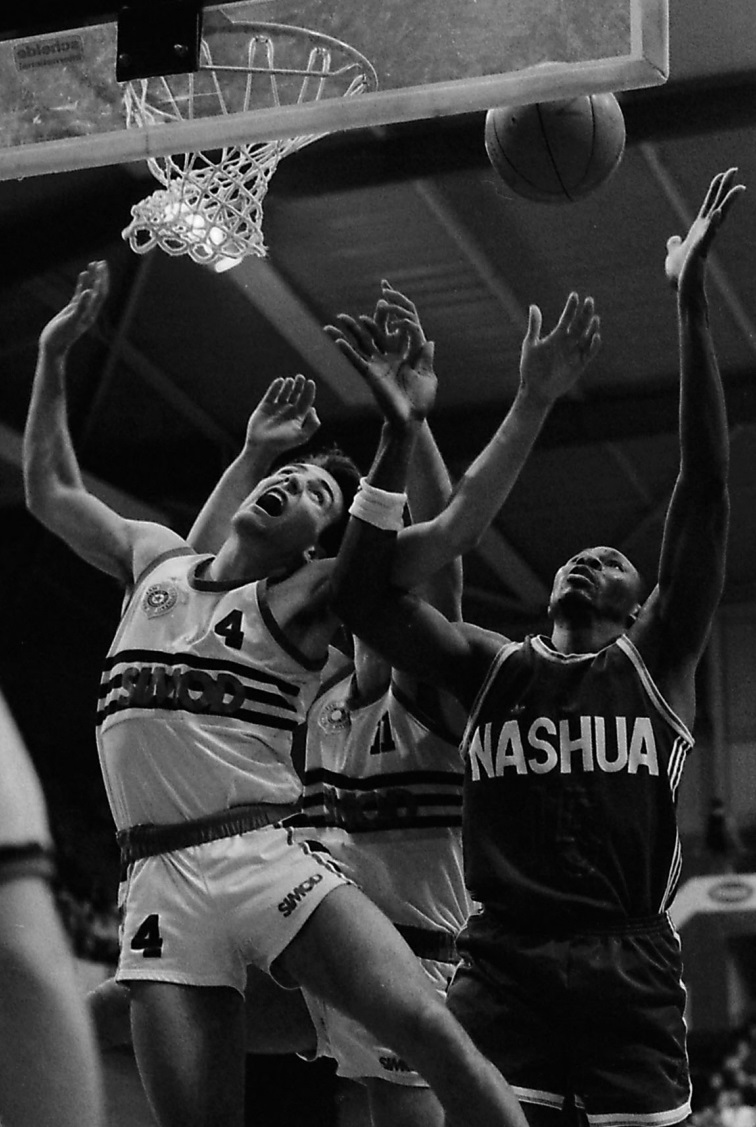
Đorđević taking on Mike Reddick of Nashua Den Bosch in the European Champions Cup in February 1988.

Following his father's advice, sixteen-year-old Đorđević joined Partizan Belgrade during the summer of 1983. Arriving at the club coached by Bora Džaković with a roster featuring Nebojša Zorkić, Milenko Savović, Goran Grbović, Danko Cvjetićanin, Boban Petrović, Arsenije Pešić, and Miško Marić, the youngster got sporadic minutes at point guard during the league season as Partizan finished in the seventh spot, good for a play-in single-game showdown against lower-tier club Sloga Kraljevo for a chance to qualify for the playoffs quarterfinal. Partizan managed to defeat Sloga but then got swept by eternal rivals Red Star Belgrade in the best-of-three playoff quarterfinal series.

Ahead of the 1984-85 season, Partizan appointed recently retired Yugoslav and club player Dragan Kićanović as club vice-president post. The club also hired former Yugoslav player Moka Slavnić as new head coach.

In summer 1990, after being away from competitive basketball for a year due to serving his mandatory Yugoslav People's Army (JNA) stint, twenty-three-year-old Đorđević spent four months at the Boston Celtics' free agent training camp, competing for a spot on the 1990–91 Celtics roster against some thirty other point guards. Đorđević joined the camp on recommendation from the Celtics' scout Mišo Oštarčević, making it to the very end of the selection process before getting cut shortly before the season began due to Brian Shaw's return to the club from Virtus Roma.

Đorđević's pro club career is most remembered for his game-winning, buzzer-beating three-pointer, in the 1991–92 FIBA European League (EuroLeague)'s 1992 Final, which he hit in the game against the Spanish club Montigalà Joventut. He was named to the 1992 EuroLeague All-Final Four Team. In addition to winning Europe's most prestigious club title, the EuroLeague championship, with Partizan Belgrade in 1992, Đorđević also won Europe's third most important competition at that time, the FIBA Korać Cup title, in the 1988–89 season. He also won two Yugoslav First Federal League championships (1986–87 and 1991–92), and two Yugoslav Cups (1989 and 1992) while with the club.

=== Olimpia Milano (1992–1994) ===
Đorđević moved from Partizan Belgrade to Olimpia Milano, which competed in the top level Italian League, in 1992. He stayed at the club for two seasons, from 1992–93 to 1993–94. With Olimpia Milano, he won the FIBA Korać Cup championship, which was Europe's third most significant competition at that time, in the 1992–93 season. He was the top scorer of the finals.

=== Fortitudo Bologna (1994–1996) ===
Đorđević moved to the Italian League club Fortitudo Bologna, in 1994. He played with the club during the 1994–95 and 1995–96 seasons.

=== Portland Trail Blazers (1996) ===
After the 1996 Summer Olympics in Atlanta, Đorđević had a stint with the Portland Trail Blazers of the National Basketball Association (NBA), during the 1996–97 season. He made his NBA debut on 29 November 1996, recording 2 points and a rebound, in a 119–93 win over the Golden State Warriors. His last NBA game was on 15 December. Unhappy with a lack of playing time, he was placed on waivers in late December 1996 after appearing in 8 games and averaging 3.1 points per game.

=== FC Barcelona Bàsquet (1996–1999) ===
After his NBA stint with the Portland Trail Blazers in 1996, Đorđević signed with FC Barcelona of Spain's premier competition, the Liga ACB, in a deal worth $3.3 million for two and a half seasons. He stayed with the club for three seasons (1996–97, 1997–98, and 1998–99). With Barcelona, he won the European-wide third-tier level FIBA Korać Cup championship of the 1998–99 season, and he was the final's top scorer. He also won two Spanish ACB League championships with the club, in the 1996–97 and 1998–99 seasons.

=== Real Madrid (1999–2002) ===
In 1999, Đorđević joined the Spanish ACB League club Real Madrid. With Real Madrid, he won the championship of the 1999–00 Spanish League season in FC Barcelona's arena. As he celebrated the title in the court he was pushed by his former teammate Nacho Rodríguez, who claimed that "Sasha has to know that you can't do that in an opponent's grounds".

He also spent the 2000–01 and 2001–02 seasons with the club.

=== Scavolini Pesaro (2003–2004) ===
After a season off, Đorđević returned to Italy and he signed with Scavolini Pesaro for the 2003–04 season. With Scavolini, Djordjevic reached the finals of the 2004 Italian Cup, where his team lost to Benetton Treviso. He also played with Pesaro in the beginning of the 2004–05 season.

=== Return to Olimpia Milano (2005) ===
On 25 February 2005, Đorđević signed with Olimpia Milano again. The club made it to the 2004–05 Italian League's Finals, where they lost to Fortitudo Bologna, 3 games to 1. The 2004–05 season was the last season of Đorđević's pro club career.

=== Retirement game ===
Đorđević officially retired from playing professional club basketball on 3 July 2005, after an exhibition game, which was held in his honor. The game was held in front of the Serbian fans in Belgrade. Many of his former teammates and toughest opponents played in that game.

== National team career ==
=== SFR Yugoslav junior national team ===
Đorđević was a member of SFR Yugoslavia's junior national teams. With the SFR Yugoslav Under-18 national team, he won the gold medal at the 1986 FIBA Europe Under-18 Championship. As a member of the SFR Yugoslav Under-19 national team, he won the gold medal at the 1987 FIBA Under-19 World Cup.

=== SFR Yugoslav national team ===
Đorđević was also a member of the senior SFR Yugoslav national team. With SFR Yugoslavia, he won a bronze medal at the 1987 EuroBasket. He also won a gold medal at the 1991 EuroBasket.

=== FR Yugoslav national team ===
Đorđević was also a member of the senior FR Yugoslav national team. With FR Yugoslavia, he won the gold medal at the 1995 EuroBasket, where he had one of the best individual performances ever in a EuroBasket Finals game. In that 1995 EuroBasket Finals game against Lithuania, he scored 41 points and made 9 out of his 12 three-point shot attempts. He also won the silver medal at the 1996 Summer Olympics.

Đorđević won another gold medal at the 1997 EuroBasket. During that tournament, he hit a game-winning shot against Croatia. Finally, Đorđević won another gold medal at the 1998 FIBA World Cup.

== Coaching career ==
=== Olimpia Milano (2006–2007) ===
Đorđević retired from playing pro basketball in 2005. On 25 January 2006, he began a new career, working as a basketball coach, when he was named the head coach of the last team that he played with, Armani Jeans Milano, of Italy's Lega Basket Serie A and Europe's premier competition, the EuroLeague. He left that position at the end of the 2006–07 Italian League season.

=== Benetton Treviso (2011–2012) ===
Đorđević's next head coaching job was with the Italian Serie A club Benetton Treviso. He coached the club during the 2011–12 season. During that season, the club competed in both the 2011–12 Italian League and also in Europe's secondary competition, the 2011–12 EuroCup.

=== Panathinaikos Athens (2015–2016) ===
On 20 June 2015, Đorđević signed a two-year contract to be the head coach of Panathinaikos, a club competing in the Greek Basket League and the EuroLeague. With Panathinaikos, he won the 2016 edition of the Greek Cup. On 20 April 2016, Panathinaikos announced the termination of Đorđević's contract.

=== Bayern Munich (2016–2018) ===
On 1 August 2016, Đorđević signed a two-year contract with the German Bundesliga team Bayern Munich, to be their head coach. In European-wide competitions, Bayern Munich participated in one of Europe's two secondary competitions, the 2016–17 EuroCup, where it was defeated in the quarterfinals by Unicaja. Bayern Munich finished the 2016–17 Basketball Bundesliga regular season in 3rd place, with 28–4 record, and was eliminated by Brose Bamberg in their semifinal playoff series, with a 3–0 series score. Bayern also finished as the runner-up of the 2017 German Cup for the second season in a row, after losing in the Cup's Final to Brose Bamberg, by a score of 74–71.

Over the summer of 2017, Maik Zirbes, a prominent center, joined the team. Bayern Munich started the 2017–18 German League season in a dominant fashion, leading the league's standings table. In February 2018, Bayern Munich won the 2018 German Cup, after an 80–75 win over Alba Berlin, and the club thus won the German Cup trophy for the first time in 50 years.

On 29 March 2018, Đorđević was sacked by Bayern, after the club's elimination in the semifinals of the 2017–18 EuroCup. During that season, Bayern Munich held the first position in the 2017–18 Basketball Bundesliga regular season standings, with a record of 23–2, before he was sacked. A few days after his dismissal, Đorđević stated that his firing was an "insult for common sense", especially since the 2017–18 season was one of the most successful in the team's history. He also added that there was an apparent disagreement between the team's management (in particular general manager Marko Pešić), and his coaching staff, as he had not allowed the team's management to have a bigger role in coaching decisions.

=== Virtus Bologna (2019–2021) ===
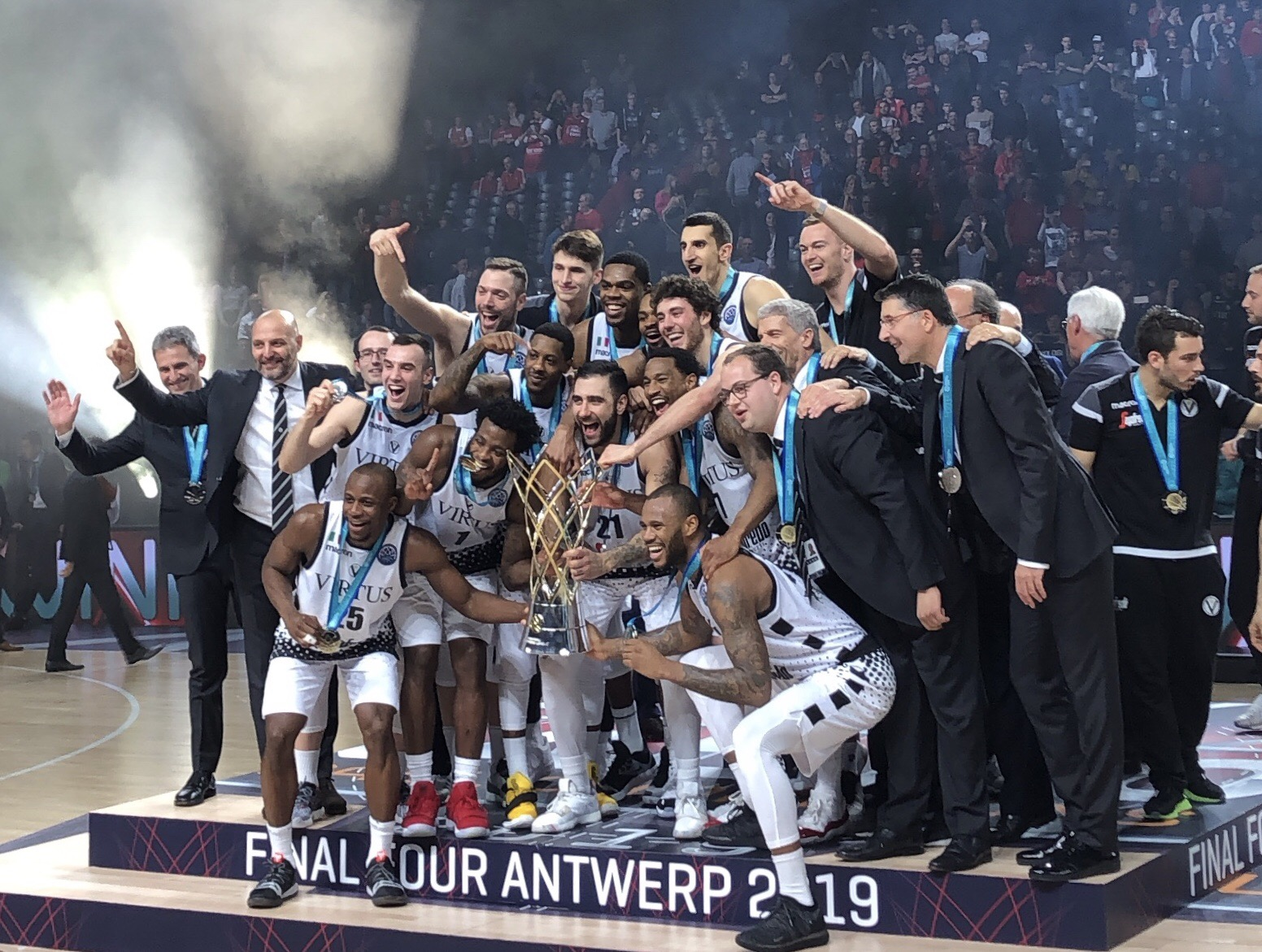
Coach Đorđević and the team, after winning the 2018–19 Basketball Champions League in Antwerp

On 11 March 2019, Đorđević signed to be the head coach of Virtus Bologna of the Lega Basket Serie A. In his Virtus Bologna debut on 13 March, Đorđević led the team to an 81–58 victory over Le Mans Sarthe. Virtus Bologna advanced to the 2019 Basketball Champions League Final Four in Antwerp, where the club won the championship on 5 May, after defeating Iberostar Tenerife, by a score of 73–61, in part thanks to an outstanding game by Kevin Punter, who was named the BCL Final Four MVP. The 2019 BCL championship was the fifth European-wide title in the team's history, and the first one it had won in ten years.

On 13 July, Virtus signed a three-year deal with Miloš Teodosić, 2016 EuroLeague champion and former NBA player, who was widely considered one of the best European point guard of all time. Among others, the team signed also Vince Hunter, Frank Gaines, Kyle Weems, Julian Gamble, Stefan Marković and Giampaolo Ricci. On 7 April 2020, after more than a month of suspension, the Italian Basketball Federation officially ended the 2019–20 season, due to the coronavirus pandemic that severely hit Italy. Virtus ended the season first, with 18 wins and only 2 defeats, but the title was not assigned.

On 7 December 2020, just 10 games after the starting of the season, Đorđević was unexpectedly and suddenly relieved from Bologna and, with him, his coaching assistant Goran Bjedov. However, on the following day, after a long confrontation with the ownership, Đorđević was confirmed as coach. In April 2021, despite a winning record of 19–2, Virtus was defeated in the EuroCup's semifinals by UNICS Kazan. However, the season ended with a great success. In fact, after having knocked out 3–0 both Basket Treviso in the quarterfinals and New Basket Brindisi in the semifinals, on 11 June Virtus defeated 4–0 its historic rival Olimpia Milano in the national finals, winning its 16th national title and the first one after twenty years. With a winning record of 10–0, Đorđević became the coach with the best playoffs winning percentage in the history of the club.

On 15 June, after a few days from the victory, Đorđević was not renewed as head coach at the end of his two-year contract, due to tensions with the club's ownership which occurred during the season.

=== Fenerbahçe Beko (2021–2022) ===
On 31 July 2021, Đorđević has signed with Fenerbahçe Beko of the Basketball Super League. He left the club on 17 June 2022, following a championship in the 2021–22 Turkish League against 2022 Euroleague Champion Anadolu Efes.

== Coaching record ==
Legend
G	Games coached	W	Games won	L	Games lost	W–L %	Win-loss %

Note: The EuroLeague is not the only competition in which the team played during the season. He also coached in domestic competition, and regional competition if applicable.

=== Domestic Leagues ===
Team	Year	G	W	L	W–L%	Result
FC Bayern Munich	2016–17	39	31	8	.795	Lost 2017 German League Semifinals Round
FC Bayern Munich	2017–18	25	23	2	.920	Fired
Virtus Bologna	2019–20	20	18	2	.900	Season cancelled due to COVID-19 pandemic
Virtus Bologna	2020–21	38	29	9	.763	Won 2021 Italian League Finals
Fenerbahçe Beko	2021–22	41	32	9	.780	Won 2022 Turkish Super League Finals
Career		211	173	38	.820	

=== EuroLeague ===
Team	Year	G	W	L	W–L%	Result
Olimpia Milano	2005–06	3	2	1	.667	Eliminated in group stage
Panathinaikos	2015–16	27	15	12	.556	Lost in Quarterfinal Playoffs
Fenerbahçe Beko	2021–22	28	10	18	.357	Eliminated in group stage
Career		58	27	31	.466	

== National team coaching ==
=== Serbia national team (2013–2019) ===
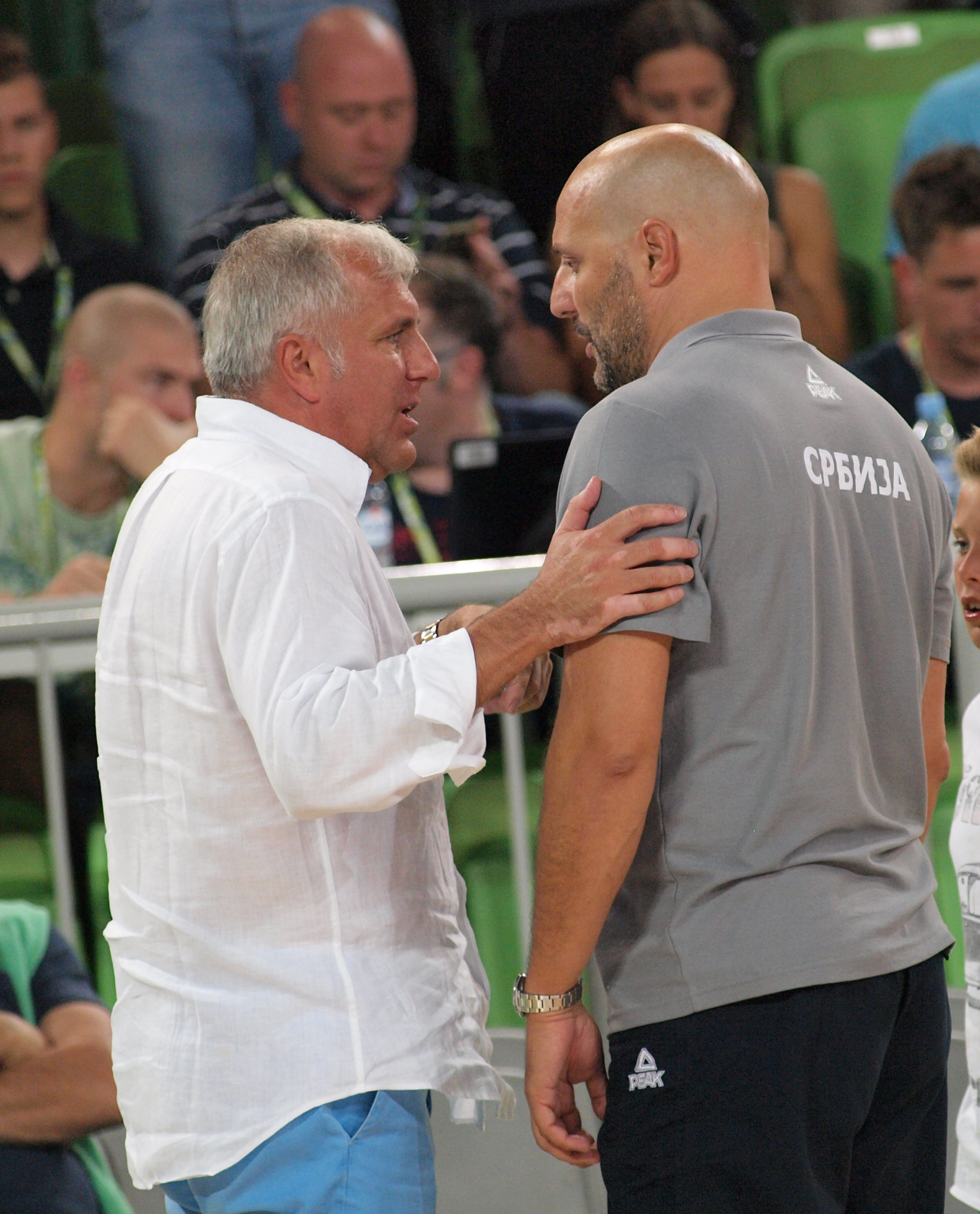
Đorđević with Željko Obradović in 2015. For seven seasons at KK Partizan from 1984 until 1991, the two shared minutes at point guard.

On 25 December 2013, Đorđević was officially named the head coach of the Serbian national basketball team. With Serbia, he took the silver medal at the 2014 FIBA World Cup. In June 2015, he signed an extension with the Basketball Federation of Serbia, to be the team's head coach until 2019.

His second major tournament in which he led the Serbian national team was the 2015 EuroBasket. In the first phase of the tournament, Serbia dominated in the tournament's toughest group (Group B), with a 5–0 record, and then eliminated Finland and the Czech Republic in the round of 16 and quarterfinal games, respectively. However, Serbia were stopped in their semifinal game by Lithuania, by a score of 67–64, and they eventually also lost to the host team, France, in the bronze-medal game, by a score of 81–68.

On 21 August 2016, he led Serbia's national team to the silver medal at the 2016 Summer Olympics. At the 2017 EuroBasket, Serbia won the silver medal, after losing in the final game to Slovenia.

At the 2019 FIBA World Cup, Serbia lost to Argentina in their quarterfinals game. In the classification games, Serbia defeated the United States and Czech Republic, and thus finished the tournament in 5th place. After the game versus the Czech Republic, Đorđević announced that he would no longer be the head coach of Serbia's senior national team.

=== China national team (2022–2024) ===
On 16 November 2022, Đorđević was named the head coach of the China national basketball team.

Đorđević will take the Chinese National Team for the FIBA World Cup in August 2023.

== Awards and accomplishments ==
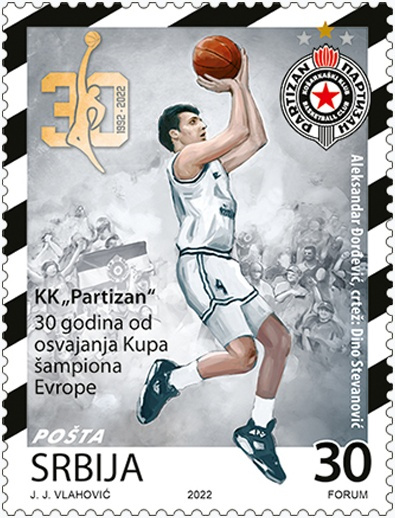
Đorđević on a 2022 stamp of Serbia

Club titles that Đorđević won as a senior level player:

- EuroLeague Champion:
  - 1992
- FIBA Korać Cup Champion:
  - 1989, 1993, 1999
- Spanish ACB League Champion:
  - 1997, 1999, 2000
- Yugoslav First Federal League Champion:
  - 1987, 1992
- Yugoslav National cup Winner:
  - 1989, 1992

Club titles that Đorđević won as a head coach:

- FIBA Champions League Champion: (with Virtus Bologna: 2018–19)
- Italian Basketball League Champion: (with Virtus Bologna: 2020–21)
- Turkish Basketball League Champion: (with Fenerbahçe Beko: 2021–22)
- Greek Cup Winner: (with Panathinaikos: 2015–16)
- German Cup Winner: (with FC Bayern Munich: 2017–18)

== Personal life ==
Đorđević is one of UNICEF's National Ambassadors for Serbia, alongside Emir Kusturica, Ana Ivanovic, Jelena Janković and Novak Djokovic. He is also one of the founders of the humanitarian organization Group Seven, as well as the President of the Belgrade Marathon. Đorđević has also worked as a sports commentator for EuroLeague TV.

== See also ==
- 50 Greatest EuroLeague Contributors (2008)
- List of European basketball players in the United States
- List of Serbian NBA players
- List of Olympic medalists in basketball
- List of foreign NBA players
- List of UNICEF Goodwill Ambassadors
- Sports in Serbia

Awards
Preceded by Jasna Šekarić	The Best Athlete of Yugoslavia; 1995	Succeeded by Aleksandra Ivošev
