= Giampaolo Ricci =

Italian basketball player

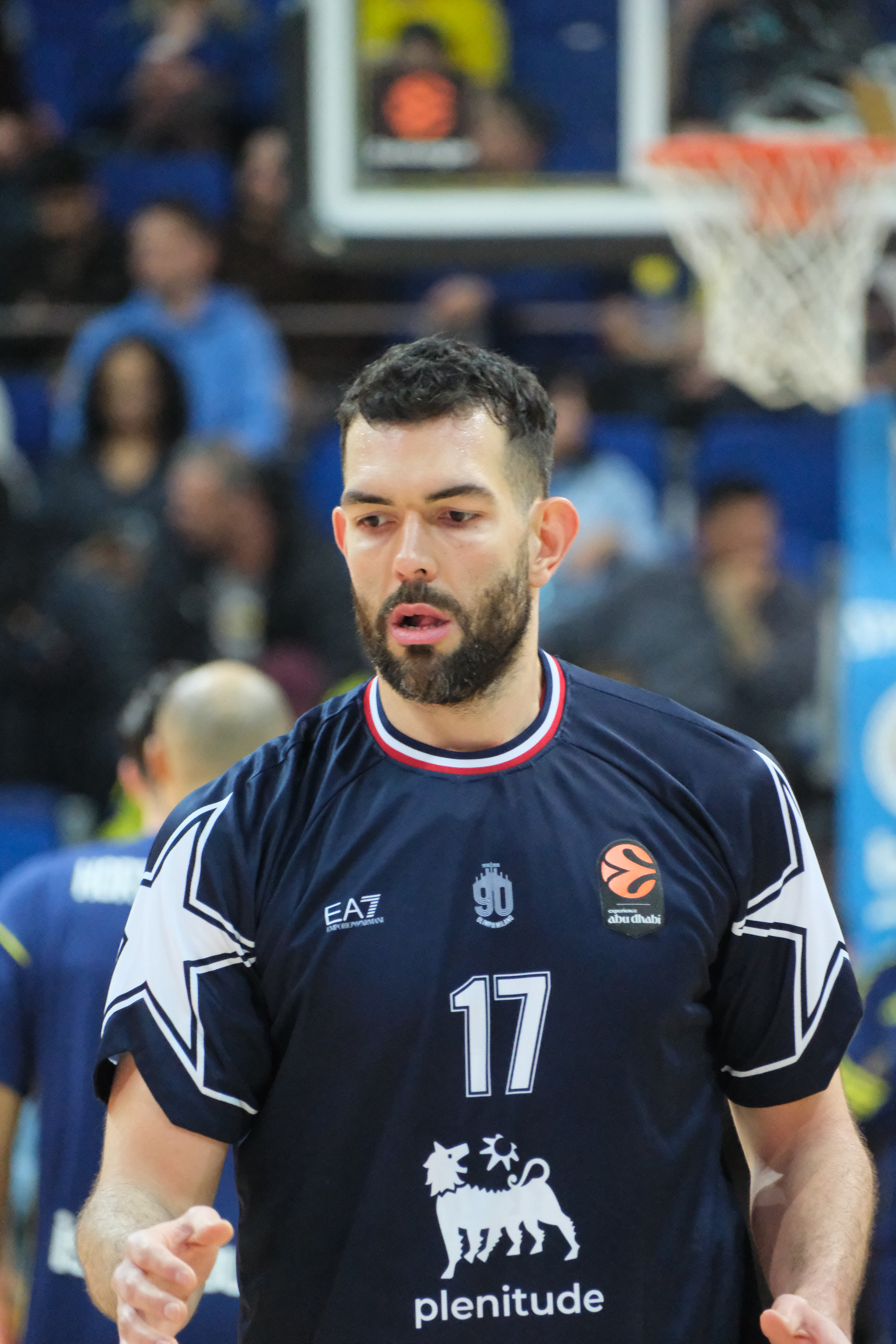
- Ricci with Olimpia Milano in 2026

No. 17 – Olimpia Milano
- Position: Small forward / power forward
- League: Lega Basket Serie A EuroLeague

Personal information
- Born: September 27, 1991 (age 35) Rome, Italy
- Listed height: 2.02 m (6 ft 8 in)
- Listed weight: 100 kg (220 lb)

Career information
- Playing career: 2007–present

Career history
- 2007–2009: Basket Chieti
- 2009–2011: Stella Azzurra Roma
- 2011–2015: Assigeco Casalpusterlengo
- 2015–2016: Scaligera Basket Verona
- 2016–2017: Basket Tortona
- 2017–2019: Vanoli Cremona
- 2019–2021: Virtus Bologna
- 2021–present: Olimpia Milano

Career highlights
- 5× Italian League champion (2021–2024, 2026); 3× Italian Cup winner (2019, 2022, 2026); 3× Italian Supercup winner (2024–2026)

Giampaolo Ricci (born September 27, 1991) is an Italian professional basketball player and the team captain for Olimpia Milano of the Italian Lega Basket Serie A (LBA) and the EuroLeague. He plays at the forward positions. Ricci has also represented the Italian national team in international competition.

== Professional career ==
Ricci started playing for Basket Chieti, moving in 2009 to Stella Azzurra Roma and then to Assigeco Casalpusterlengo until 2015. In the season 2014/2015 he performed 11.2 ppg and 5.5 rpg in 26 games In 2016 he moved to Scaligera Basket Verona scoring 6 points and 3.8 rebounds of average and winning the price "Scaligero d'oro" as the most appreciated player of the year for the Scaligera Basket Verona team. He then played in 2016/2017 38 games with Derthona Basket where he performed 9.5ppg, 6.2rpg and 1.7apg in average. Ricci contributed to his team ending the regular season as at the second position in the league. He reaches in 2017 the first Italian category (Serie A) LBA under the guidance of the Italian National team coach Romeo Sacchetti. Ricci won Italian Cup in 2019 with Guerino Vanoli Basket under the guidance of Coach Romeo Sacchetti.

=== Virtus Bologna (2019–2021) ===
On June 13, 2019, he has signed with Virtus Bologna of the Italian Lega Basket Serie A (LBA). In September 2020, he was appointed team captain of the club and he won the Italian Championship with Virtus Bologna under the guidance of Sasha Djordjevic.

After having knocked out 3–0 both Basket Treviso in the quarterfinals and New Basket Brindisi in the semifinals, on 11 June 2021 Virtus defeated 4–0 its historic rival Olimpia Milan in the national finals, winning its 16th national title and the first one after twenty years.

=== Olimpia Milano (2021–present) ===
On July 6, 2021, Ricci signed a two-year contract with Italian powerhouse Olimpia Milano. On July 7, 2023, Ricci renewed his contract through 2025.

== International career ==
Ricci played for the Italian national team between 2018 and 2021 on eighteen occasions.

== Career statistics ==
Legend
GP	Games played	GS	Games started	MPG	Minutes per game
FG%	Field-goal percentage	3P%	3-point field-goal percentage	FT%	Free-throw percentage
RPG	Rebounds per game	APG	Assists per game	SPG	Steals per game
BPG	Blocks per game	PPG	Points per game	PIR	Performance index rating
**Bold**	Career high

=== EuroLeague ===
Year	Team	GP	GS	MPG	FG%	3P%	FT%	RPG	APG	SPG	BPG	PPG	PIR
2021–22	Olimpia Milano	**36**	**5**	**12.3**	**.469**	**.362**	.500	2.2	**.4**	**.4**	.1	**3.2**	**3.0**
2022–23	Olimpia Milano	29	**5**	10.3	.452	.324	**.700**	**2.3**	.3	**.4**	**.2**	2.6	2.6
2023–24	Olimpia Milano	22	2	7.0	.226	.174	—	1.1	.1	.3	.1	.8	0.0
Career		87	12	10.3	.423	.313	.600	2.0	.3	.4	.1	2.4	2.1

=== EuroCup ===
Year	Team	GP	GS	MPG	FG%	3P%	FT%	RPG	APG	SPG	BPG	PPG	PIR
2019–20	Virtus Bologna	16	15	**22.3**	.433	**.365**	**.727**	**4.6**	**1.7**	**.8**	**.3**	**7.6**	**7.9**
2020–21	Virtus Bologna	**21**	**20**	19.4	**.481**	.359	.714	3.8	1.4	.4	.1	6.4	2.1
Career		37	35	20.6	.457	.362	.720	4.1	1.5	.5	.2	6.9	7.2

=== Domestic leagues ===
Year	Team	League	GP	MPG	FG%	3P%	FT%	RPG	APG	SPG	BPG	PPG
2011–12	(Italy) Piacenza	Serie B	36	20.1	.471	.385	.722	7.1	.7	1.0	.3	7.2
2013–14	(Italy) Piacenza	Serie A2	26	30.0	.421	.333	.722	5.9	.5	.9	.5	10.5
2014–15	(Italy) Piacenza	Serie A2	29	27.8	.437	.375	.837	5.3	.7	.9	.4	10.4
2015–16	(Italy) Scaligera Verona	Serie A2	32	16.4	.376	.321	.560	3.8	.5	.6	.1	6.0
2016–17	(Italy) Derthona Tortona	Serie A2	35	24.5	.435	.290	.614	6.3	1.8	.7	.3	9.7
2017–18	(Italy) Vanoli Cremona	LBA	32	12.0	.340	.269	.667	2.9	.6	.5	.1	4.5
2018–19	(Italy) Vanoli Cremona	LBA	39	17.6	.405	.293	.688	4.4	.7	.4	.2	9.5
2019–20	(Italy) Virtus Bologna	LBA	20	23.8	.483	.438	.824	4.9	1.8	.9	.1	9.2
2020–21	(Italy) Virtus Bologna	LBA	38	20.2	.440	.370	.818	4.5	1.5	.5	.2	6.8
2021–22	(Italy) Olimpia Milano	LBA	41	14.6	.437	.329	.800	3.3	1.0	.6	.2	4.5
2022–23	(Italy) Olimpia Milano	LBA	44	14.3	.492	.406	.846	2.2	.6	.4	.2	3.7
2023–24	(Italy) Olimpia Milano	LBA	34	10.6	.430	.322	.833	2.1	.5	.2	.1	3.4

== Player profile ==
Ricci is a player renowned for his 3-point shots (37% shooting in seasons 2020–2021) and his defensive skills made him a notable player in the European panorama.
