= Riccardo Moraschini =

Italian basketball player (born 1991)

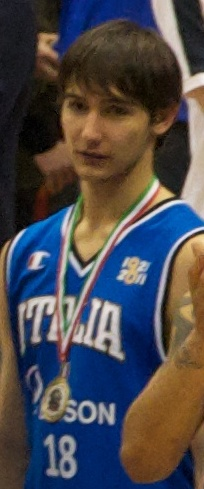

No. 9 – Pallacanestro Cantù
- Position: Guard / small forward
- League: LBA

Personal information
- Born: January 8, 1991 (age 35) Cento, Italy
- Listed height: 194 cm (6 ft 4 in)
- Listed weight: 93 kg (205 lb)

Career information
- NBA draft: 2013: undrafted
- Playing career: 2007–present

Career history
- 2007–2013: Virtus Bologna
- 2011: →Angelico Biella
- 2011–2012: →Pallacanestro Sant'Antimo
- 2013–2014: Acea Virtus Roma
- 2014–2016: Dinamica Mantova
- 2016–2018: Aquila Basket Trento
- 2018–2019: New Basket Brindisi
- 2019–2022: Olimpia Milano
- 2022–2023: Reyer Venezia
- 2023–present: Pallacanestro Cantù

Career highlights
- Italian Cup winner (2021); Italian Super Cup winner (2020); 2× Italian League All-Star (2011, 2012)
Medals
Men's basketball
Representing Italy
FIBA Europe Under-20 Championship
Silver medal – second place	2011 Bilbao	National Team

Riccardo Moraschini (born January 8, 1991) is an Italian professional basketball player and the team captain for Pallacanestro Cantù of the Lega Basket Serie A (LBA). Standing at 1.94 m (6 ft 4 1/2 in), he can play as a combo guard, as well as a small forward.

== Professional career ==
After working his way through the youth ranks of Virtus Bologna he made his Serie A, and Euroleague, debut in 2007–2008, however he only started to play consistent minutes from 2009 to 2010. Struggling to break into a strong team, he was loaned to fellow Serie A side Angelico Biella for the second part of the 2010–11 season and then to Legadue side Sant'Antimo the following season in order to play more.

After still not holding a starting place following these loans and the 2012–13 season he moved on to rival Acea Virtus Roma on a 1-year contract. With Virtus he would play in the Eurocup and reach the play-off semifinals, however he did not convince the team to extend his contract and became a free agent.

He then moved to Serie A2 side Dinamica Mantova.

On July 20, 2016, Moraschini signed with the Italian team Aquila Basket Trento.

On July 13, 2018, Moraschini signed a deal with New Basket Brindisi.

On July 16, 2019, Moraschini signed a three-year contract with Olimpia Milano of the EuroLeague. On January 3, 2022, Moraschini received a one-year suspension by the Italian National Anti-Doping Tribunal (TNA), after testing positive for clostebol metabolite, an anabolic steroid.

On July 2, 2022, he has signed with Reyer Venezia Mestre of the Italian Lega Basket Serie A (LBA).

On November 11, 2023, he signed with Pallacanestro Cantù.

== Italian national team ==
He started in the under age categories of the Italian national basketball team, most notably winning the silver medal at the 2011 FIBA Europe Under-20 Championship where he was a starter, before joining the senior team first in 2011 and then on a regular basis from 2013, playing a marginal part in FIBA EuroBasket 2015 qualification in which they qualified for FIBA EuroBasket 2015.

== Career statistics ==
Legend
GP	Games played	GS	Games started	MPG	Minutes per game
FG%	Field-goal percentage	3P%	3-point field-goal percentage	FT%	Free-throw percentage
RPG	Rebounds per game	APG	Assists per game	SPG	Steals per game
BPG	Blocks per game	PPG	Points per game	PIR	Performance index rating
**Bold**	Career high

=== Euroleague ===
Year	Team	GP	GS	MPG	FG%	3P%	FT%	RPG	APG	SPG	BPG	PPG	PIR
2007–08	VidiVici Bologna	2	2	17.33	0.0	0.0	0.0	1.0	0.0	1.5	0.0	0.0	-1.0
Career		2	2	17.33	0.0	0.0	0.0	1.0	0.0	1.5	0.0	0.0	-1.0

=== Eurocup ===
Year	Team	GP	GS	MPG	FG%	3P%	FT%	RPG	APG	SPG	BPG	PPG	PIR
2013–14	Acea Virtus Roma	10	0	14.28	50.0	27.3	77.8	1.9	1.1	0.5	0.1	4.4	4.4
Career		10	0	14.28	50.0	27.3	77.8	1.9	1.1	0.5	0.1	4.4	4.4

=== Lega Basket Serie A ===
==== Regular season ====
Legend
GP	Games played	GS	Games started	MPG	Minutes per game
FG%	Field goal percentage	3P%	3-point field goal percentage	FT%	Free throw percentage
RPG	Rebounds per game	APG	Assists per game	SPG	Steals per game
BPG	Blocks per game	PPG	Points per game	**Bold**	Career high

Year	Team	GP	GS	MPG	FG%	3P%	FT%	RPG	APG	SPG	BPG	PPG
2007-08	Virtus Bologna	12	5	3.2	0.0	**100.0**	0.0	0.4	0.0	0.4	0.0	0.6
2008-09	Virtus Bologna	5	2	1.5	0.0	0.0	0.0	1.0	0.0	0.0	0.0	0.0
2009-10	Virtus Bologna	26	20	9.9	29.2	35.7	66.7	0.8	0.6	0.5	**0.1**	2.1
2010-11	Virtus Bologna	15	12	10.6	31.3	16.7	60.0	1.3	0.3	0.4	0.0	1.6
2010-11	Angelico Biella	14	13	11.4	**56.5**	25.0	80.0	0.8	0.6	**0.6**	0.0	3.2
2012-13	Virtus Bologna	25	22	**14.3**	45.8	10.0	70.5	**2.0**	**0.9**	0.5	**0.1**	**4.1**
2013-14	Acea Virtus Roma	**30**	**27**	10.8	41.5	20.8	**92.9**	1.4	0.6	0.5	0.0	2.7
Career		127	101	8.81	29.18	29.74	52.87	1.01	0.42	0.41	0.02	1.95

==== Playoffs ====
Year	Team	GP	GS	MPG	FG%	3P%	FT%	RPG	APG	SPG	BPG	PPG
2008-09	Virtus Bologna	2	1	1.0	0.0	0.0	0.0	0.0	0.0	0.0	0.0	0.0
2009-10	Virtus Bologna	5	5	**14.0**	25.0	40.0	0.0	**1.4**	**0.2**	**0.6**	**0.2**	**1.6**
2013-14	Acea Virtus Roma	**8**	**7**	10.9	**50.0**	**50.0**	0.0	1.1	0.1	0.1	0.0	1.4
Career		15	13	8.63	25.0	30.0	0.0	0.83	0.1	0.23	0.06	1.0
