= Stefan Marković (basketball) =

Serbian basketball player

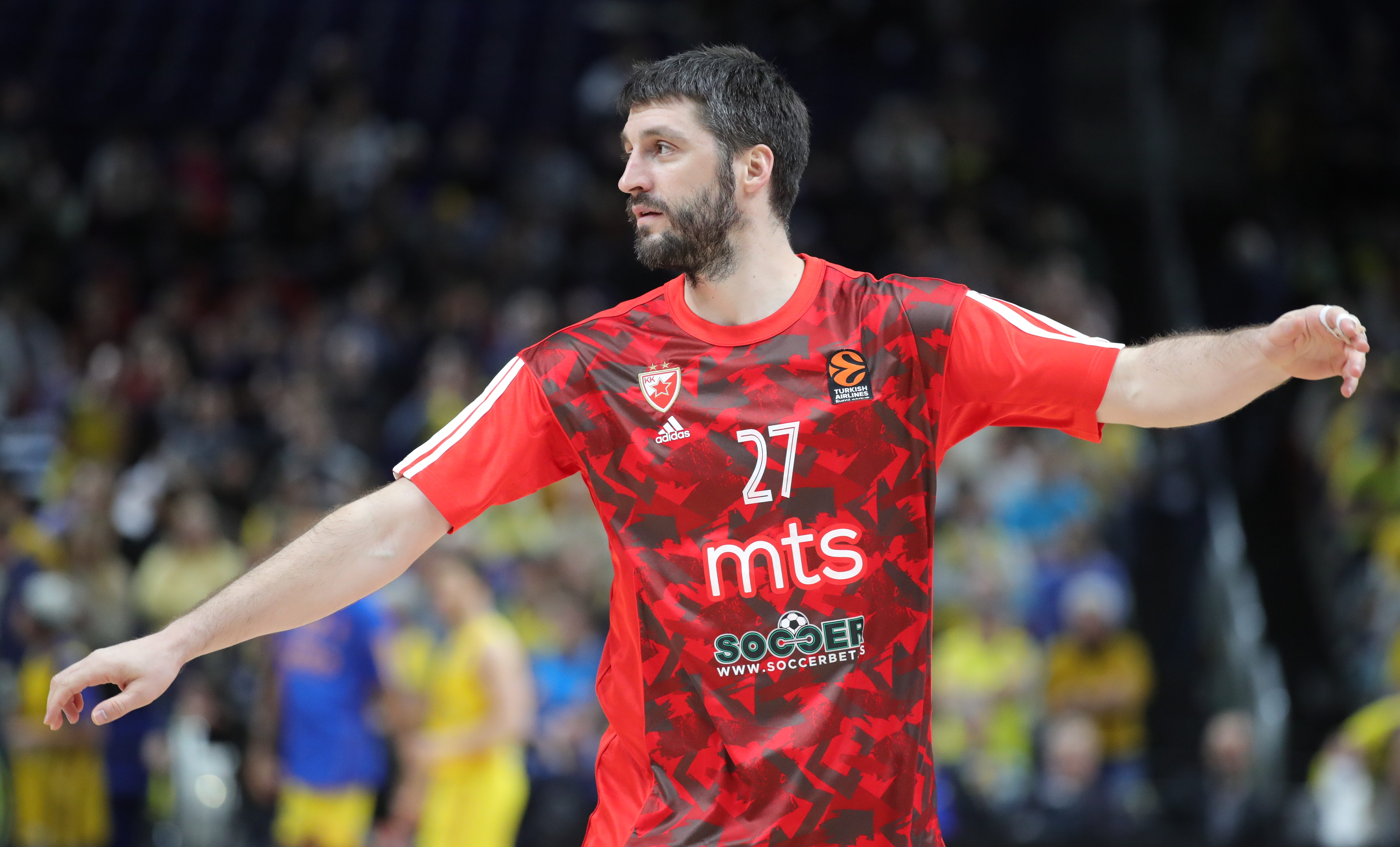
- Marković with Crvena zvezda in 2022

Personal information
- Born: 25 April 1988 (age 38) Belgrade, SR Serbia, SFR Yugoslavia
- Listed height: 1.97 m (6 ft 6 in)
- Listed weight: 98 kg (216 lb)

Career information
- NBA draft: 2010: undrafted
- Playing career: 2005–2023
- Position: Point guard / shooting guard
- Number: 9, 27

Career history
- 2005–2006: Atlas
- 2006–2010: Hemofarm
- 2010–2011: Benetton Treviso
- 2011–2013: Valencia
- 2013–2014: Banvit
- 2014–2016: Málaga
- 2016–2017: Zenit Saint Petersburg
- 2017–2019: Khimki Moscow
- 2019–2021: Virtus Bologna
- 2021–2023: Crvena zvezda

Career highlights
- ABA League champion (2022); 2× Serbian League champion (2022, 2023); 2× Serbian Cup winner (2022, 2023); Italian League champion (2021); VTB United League All-Star (2017)
Medals
Men's basketball
Representing Serbia
Summer Olympics
Silver medal – second place	2016 Rio de Janeiro	Team
World Cup
Silver medal – second place	2014 Spain
EuroBasket
Silver medal – second place	2009 Poland
U19 World Cup
Gold medal – first place	2007 Serbia	Team

Stefan Marković (Serbian Cyrillic: Стефан Марковић; born 25 April 1988) is a Serbian former professional basketball player. He also represented the Serbia national basketball team internationally. He is a 1.99 metres (6 ft 6 in) tall combo guard.

== Professional career ==
Marković began his professional career with KK Atlas. From 2006 to 2010 he was member of Hemofarm. Season 2010–11 he spent in Italy playing with Benetton Treviso.

In June 2011 he signed a two-years plus an option for a third one contract with Valencia Basket in Spain. In July 2013, negotiations for a new contract fell apart and he became a free agent. In October 2013, he signed a one-year deal with Banvit. On 27 June 2014, Marković signed a two-year deal with Unicaja.

On 13 August 2016, Marković signed a one-year deal with Russian club Zenit Saint Petersburg.

On 23 June 2017, Marković signed a two-year deal with Russian club Khimki. In 2018–19 season, he averaged 6.1 points, 4.4 assists and 2.1 rebounds in 23.3 minutes of action in the EuroLeague and 6.3 points, 5.0 assists, 3.2 rebounds in VTB United League. On 18 July 2019, Khimki parted ways with Marković.

On 2 August 2019, Marković signed a contract with the Italian team Virtus Bologna. After having knocked out 3–0 both Basket Treviso in the quarterfinals and New Basket Brindisi in the semifinals, on 11 June 2021 Virtus defeated 4–0 its historic rival Olimpia Milan in the national finals, winning its 16th national title and the first one after twenty years.

On 8 November 2021, Marković returned to Serbia, signing with Crvena zvezda of the Adriatic League. The club won the ABA League, the Serbian League, and the Serbian Cup during the 2021–2022 season.

On 23 June 2023, he announced his retirement from professional basketball.

== Serbian national team ==
Marković played with the senior Serbian national basketball team at the EuroBasket 2009, where he won the silver medal. He has been a member of the Serbian national team at the 2010 FIBA World Championship where Serbia was defeated by Lithuania in the game for the bronze medal. He was capped once more for the national team of Serbia at the EuroBasket 2011 in Lithuania where Serbia finished 8th.

Marković represented the national basketball at the EuroBasket 2013. He was also a member of the Serbian national basketball team that won the silver medal at the 2014 FIBA Basketball World Cup under new head coach Aleksandar Đorđević.

He also represented Serbia at the EuroBasket 2015. In the first phase of the tournament, Serbia dominated in the toughest Group B with 5-0 record, and then eliminated Finland and Czech Republic in the round of 16 and quarterfinal game, respectively. However, they were stopped in the semifinal game by Lithuania with 67–64, and eventually lost to the host team France in the bronze-medal game with 81–68. Over 9 tournament games, Marković averaged 5.1 points, 1.9 rebounds and 2.6 assists per game on 39.1% shooting from the field.

Marković also represented Serbia at the 2016 Summer Olympics where they won the silver medal, after losing to the United States in the final game with 96–66. After the tournament, Marković announced his retirement from the national team.

== Career statistics ==
Legend
GP	Games played	GS	Games started	MPG	Minutes per game
FG%	Field-goal percentage	3P%	3-point field-goal percentage	FT%	Free-throw percentage
RPG	Rebounds per game	APG	Assists per game	SPG	Steals per game
BPG	Blocks per game	PPG	Points per game	PIR	Performance index rating
**Bold**	Career high

=== EuroLeague ===
Year	Team	GP	GS	MPG	FG%	3P%	FT%	RPG	APG	SPG	BPG	PPG	PIR
2014–15	Unicaja	21	**16**	18.9	.341	.279	.667	**2.4**	3.4	.7	.0	4.0	5.2
2015–16	Unicaja	10	6	22.3	.314	.208	.818	2.1	**4.9**	.5	.0	3.6	7.0
2017–18	Khimki	**33**	11	23.7	.317	.266	**.841**	2.3	3.8	**1.3**	**.1**	5.0	7.2
2018–19	Khimki	27	0	**23.8**	**.388**	**.349**	.750	2.1	4.4	.8	.0	**6.1**	**7.9**
Career		91	33	22.5	.345	.291	.773	2.3	4.0	.9	.0	4.9	6.9

== See also ==
- List of Olympic medalists in basketball
