= Goran Bjedov =

Croatian basketball coach and player (born 1971)

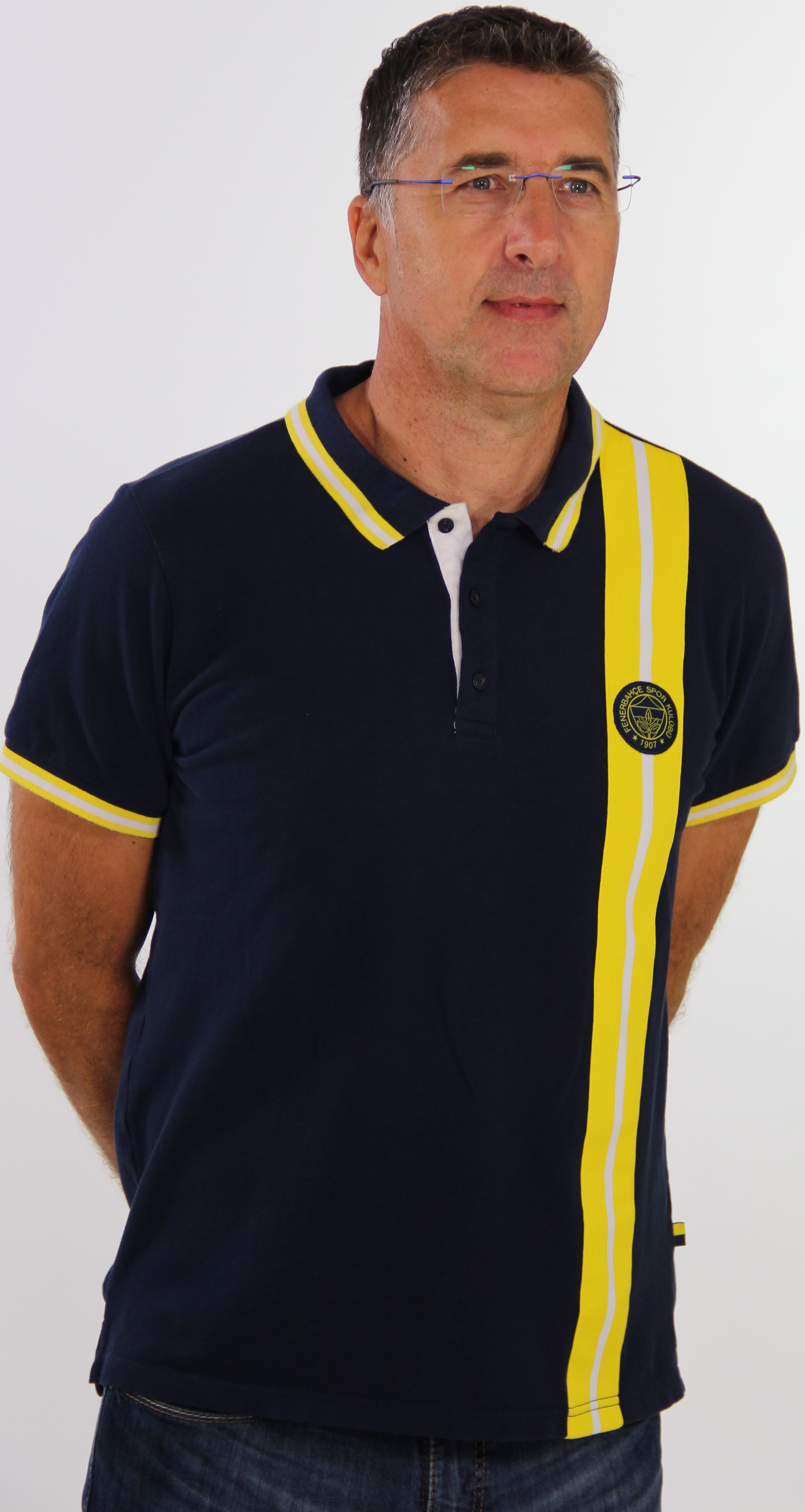
- Bjedov in 2021

Bahçeşehir Koleji
- Title: Assistant coach
- League: BSL; EuroCup

Personal information
- Born: 27 February 1971 (age 55) Zagreb, SR Croatia, SFR Yugoslavia
- Listed height: 1.95 m (6 ft 5 in)

Career information
- Playing career: 1989–1996
- Position: Small forward
- Coaching career: 1996–present

Career history

Playing
- 1989–1993: Cibona
- 1993–1994: MIV Varaždin
- 1994–1996: Media Velika Gorica

Coaching
- 1996–2000: Zrinjevac (youth)
- 2000–2005: Snaidero Udine (youth)
- 2005–2008: Valenza
- 2008–2009: Cibona (B team)
- 2009–2011: Snaidero Cucine Udine (assistant)
- 2011–2012: Benetton Treviso (assistant)
- 2012–2014: Treviso Basket 2012
- 2014–2016: Serbia (assistant)
- 2015–2016: Panathinaikos (assistant)
- 2016–2018: Bayern Munich (assistant)
- 2019–2021: Virtus Bologna (assistant)
- 2021–2022: Fenerbahçe Beko (assistant)
- 2022–2023: China (assistant)
- 2025: Beijing Royal Fighters (interim)
- 2026: Xinjiang Flying Tigers
- 2026–present: Bahçeşehir Koleji (assistant)

Career highlights
- As player: 2× Croatian League champion (1992, 1993); As assistant coach: FIBA Champions League champion (2019); Turkish League champion (2022); Italian League champion (2021); Greek Cup winner (2016); German Cup winner (2018)

Goran Bjedov (born 27 February 1971) is a Croatian professional basketball coach and former player. He is currently the assistant coach for Bahçeşehir Koleji of the Turkish Basketbol Süper Ligi (BSL) and the EuroCup.

== Coaching career ==
Bjedov began his coaching career with youth team of Zrinjevac in Zagreb. In 2000, he moved to Udine, Italy where he was the coach of Snaidero Udine youth selections. Later he coached Valenza Basket of the Italian Serie B until 2008 when he moved back to Zagreb. During 2008–09 season he was the head coach for the Cibona B team of the Croatian A2 League where he train players such as Tomislav Zubčić and Leon Radošević.

In 2009, Bjedov came back to Udine and became the assistant coach of Snaidero Udine of the Serie A2. He left in 2011 after dissolution of the club. He joined Benetton Treviso coaching staff after Serbian coach Aleksandar Đorđević became their head coach for the 2011–12 season. Following the Benetton family's planned withdrawal from professional basketball and see Benetton Treviso without backing, Bjedov moved to newly established club Treviso Basket 2012 and become the head coach. He coached Treviso for two seasons until 2014.

In 2015, Đorđević became the head coach of the Panathinaikos of the Greek League and Bjedov became his assistant coach. For 2016–17 season Bjedov moved to Germany together with Đorđević as part of his new coaching staff of the Bayern Munich.

On 11 March 2019, Bjedov joined a coaching staff of Virtus Bologna when Đorđević signed as their head coach.

On 23 August 2021, he has signed with Fenerbahçe Beko of the Basketball Super League.

=== National team ===
After a stint with Đorđević in Italy, Bjedov become the assistant coach in Đorđević's staff of Serbia men's national team in 2014. He was a part of Serbian coaching staff for the EuroBasket 2015 in Germany and France.

== Personal life ==
He is married with Bobana Radović, former basketball player. In 2000, they moved to Udine, Italy because Bobana got the PhD scholarship at the University of Udine.

== Awards and accomplishments ==
As an assistant coach

- FIBA Champions League champion: 1 (with Segafredo Virtus Bologna: 2018–19)
- Italian League champion: 1 (with Segafredo Virtus Bologna: 2020–21)
- Greek Cup winner: 1 (with Panathinaikos: 2015–16)
- German Cup winner: 1 (with FC Bayern Munich: 2017–18)
