= Stefan Nikolić (basketball, born 1997) =

Serbian basketball player

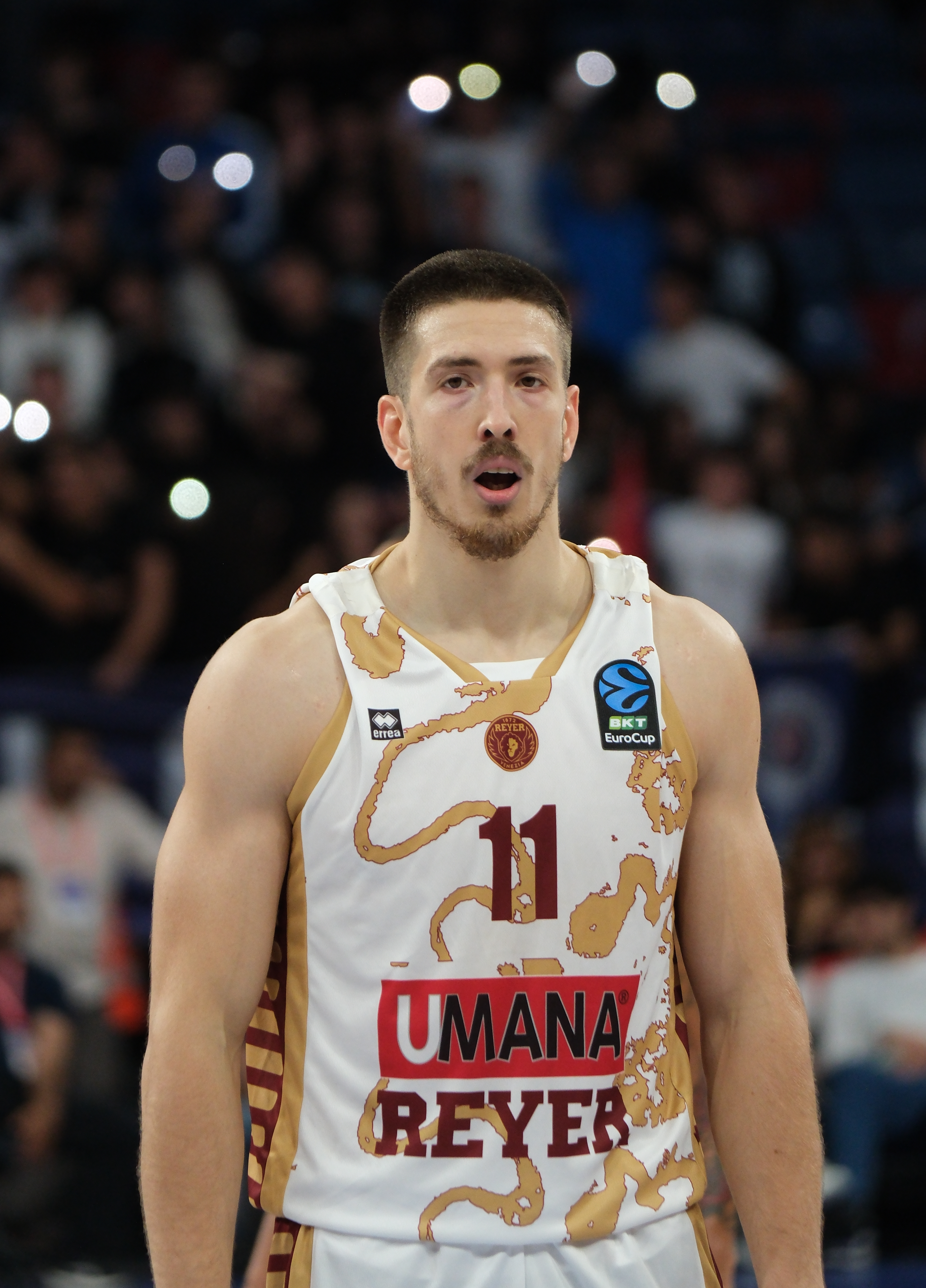
- Nikolić with Reyer Venezia in 2025

No. 11 – Openjobmetis Varese
- Position: Small forward / power forward
- League: LBA; Champions League

Personal information
- Born: 29 May 1997 (age 29) Belgrade, Serbia, FR Yugoslavia
- Listed height: 2.03 m (6 ft 8 in)
- Listed weight: 95 kg (209 lb)

Career information
- NBA draft: 2019: undrafted
- Playing career: 2016–present

Career history
- 2016–2018: Cuore Napoli
- 2018: Poderosa Montegranaro
- 2018–2019: APU Udine
- 2019–2021: Virtus Bologna
- 2021–2024: Pallacanestro Cantù
- 2024–2025: Vanoli Cremona
- 2025–2026: Umana Reyer Venezia
- 2026–present: Varese

Career highlights
- Italian League champion (2021)

Stefan Nikolić (Serbian Cyrillic: Стефан Николић; born 29 May 1997) is a Serbian professional basketball player for Pallacanestro Varese of the Lega Basket Serie A (LBA). Due to the Italian formation during his youth, he is considered an "homegrown player" in the Italian championship.
