= Julian Gamble =

American basketball player (born 1989)

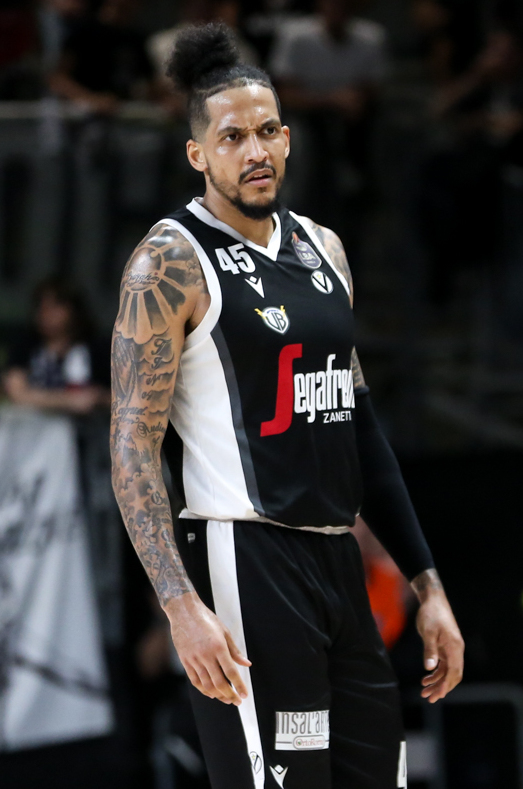
- Gamble in December 2019

Free Agent
- Position: Center

Personal information
- Born: September 15, 1989 (age 37) Durham, North Carolina, U.S.
- Listed height: 2.08 m (6 ft 10 in)
- Listed weight: 114 kg (251 lb)

Career information
- High school: Southern (Durham, North Carolina)
- College: Miami (Florida) (2008–2013)
- NBA draft: 2013: undrafted
- Playing career: 2013–present

Career history
- 2013–2014: Saint-Vallier
- 2014–2016: Brussels
- 2016–2018: Telekom Baskets Bonn
- 2018: ASVEL
- 2018–2019: Nanterre 92
- 2019: Hunan Jinjian Rice Industry
- 2019–2021: Virtus Bologna
- 2021: Lenovo Tenerife
- 2021–2022: San Pablo Burgos
- 2022–2023: Bnei Herzliya
- 2023: Beirut Club
- 2023–2024: Scafati Basket
- 2024: Lobos Plateados de la BUAP
- 2024: Hsinchu Toplus Lioneers

Career highlights
- Italian League champion (2021); German League blocks leader (2018)

Julian Lavon Gamble (born September 15, 1989) is an American professional basketball player. He plays the center position.

== Professional career ==
After five years with the Miami Hurricanes, in 2013 Gamble signed with the Saint-Vallier Basket Drôme, in France. In 2014, he became a new player of the Phoenix Brussels, where he remained until 2016. That year, he signed with Telekom Baskets Bonn of the German Basketball Bundesliga.

In May 2018, Gamble left Telekom Baskets Bonn and joined ASVEL Basket of the French LNB Pro A. However, at the end of the season, he signed with Nanterre 92 of the LNB Pro A and in the Basketball Champions League (BCL).

=== Virtus Bologna (2019–2021) ===
On July 22, 2019, he has signed with Virtus Bologna of the Italian Lega Basket Serie A (LBA). On April 7, 2020, after more than a month of suspension, the Italian Basketball Federation officially ended the 2019–20 season, due to the coronavirus pandemic that severely hit Italy. Virtus ended the season first, with 18 wins and only 2 defeats, but the title was not assigned. On May 5, the EuroCup season ended too.

In April 2021, despite a winning record of 19–2, Virtus was defeated in the EuroCup's semifinals by UNICS Kazan. However, the season ended with a great success. In fact, after having knocked out 3–0 both Basket Treviso in the quarterfinals and New Basket Brindisi in the semifinals, on June 11 Virtus defeated 4–0 its historic rival Olimpia Milan in the national finals, winning its 16th national title and the first one after twenty years.

=== Lenovo Tenerife (2021) ===
On September 28, 2021, Gamble signed with Lenovo Tenerife of the Spanish Liga ACB, called to replace the injured Giorgi Shermadini. He averaged 10.2 points and 4.6 rebounds per game. Gamble parted ways with the team on November 7.

=== San Pablo Burgos (2021–2022) ===
On November 10, 2021, he has signed with San Pablo Burgos of the Spanish Liga ACB.

=== Bnei Herzliya (2022–2023) ===
On October 10, 2022, he has signed with Bnei Herzliya of the Israeli Basketball Premier League.

=== Scafati Basket (2023–2024) ===
On December 8, 2023, he signed with Scafati Basket of the Lega Basket Serie A (LBA). He signed with The Raleigh Firebirds of the TBL on May 13, 2024, for the remainder of the TBL season.

=== Hsinchu Toplus Lioneers (2024) ===
On December 10, 2024, Gamble signed with the Hsinchu Toplus Lioneers of the Taiwan Professional Basketball League (TPBL). On January 3, 2025, Hsinchu Toplus Lioneers terminated the contract relationship with Gamble.

=== The Basketball Tournament ===
In the summers of 2014 and 2017, Gamble played in The Basketball Tournament on ESPN for team Armored Athlete. He competed for the $2 million prize, and for team Armored Athlete in 2017, he averaged 15.3 points per game along with 7.8 rebounds per game.

Gamble helped take team Armored Athlete in 2017 to the West Regional Championship Game, where they lost to Team Challenge ALS 75–63. In TBT 2018, Gamble averaged 10 points, 10 rebounds, and 2.3 blocks per game for Armored Athlete. They reached the Super 16 before falling to Boeheim's Army.
