= 2009–10 Lega Basket Serie A =

Never Gonna Give You Up

Lega Basket Serie A
- Season: 2009–10
- Duration: 11 October 2009 – 19 June 2010
- Teams: 16

Regular season
- Top seed: Montepaschi Siena
- Season MVP: (Central African Republic) Romain Sato
- Relegated: B.C. Ferrara; NSB Napoli

Finals
- Champions: Montepaschi Siena; 5th title
- Runners-up: Armani Jeans Milano
- Semifinalists: NGC Medical Cantù; Pepsi Caserta
- Finals MVP: (United States) Terrell McIntyre

The 2006–07 Lega Basket Serie A season, known as the Serie A TIM for sponsorship reasons, was the 88th season of the Lega Basket Serie A, the highest professional basketball league in Italy.

The regular season ran from 11 October 2009 to May 2010. The top 8 teams made the play-offs whilst the lowest ranked teams, B.C. Ferrara and the bankrupt club NSB Napoli, were relegated to the Legadue.

Montepaschi Siena won their 5th title by winning the playoff finals series against Armani Jeans Milano.

== Rules ==
=== Format ===
The participating 16 teams disputed the regular season based on home-and-away matches. At the end of regular season, the highest ranked 8 teams were admitted into play-off, with the lowest two ranked teams being relegated to LegADue

=== Squad rules ===
Every team was allowed to present in its roster up to 6 athletes that haven't been "formed" in Italy (of which at least 3 have to be citizens of European Union), out of total 12 players in squad.

== Participating teams ==
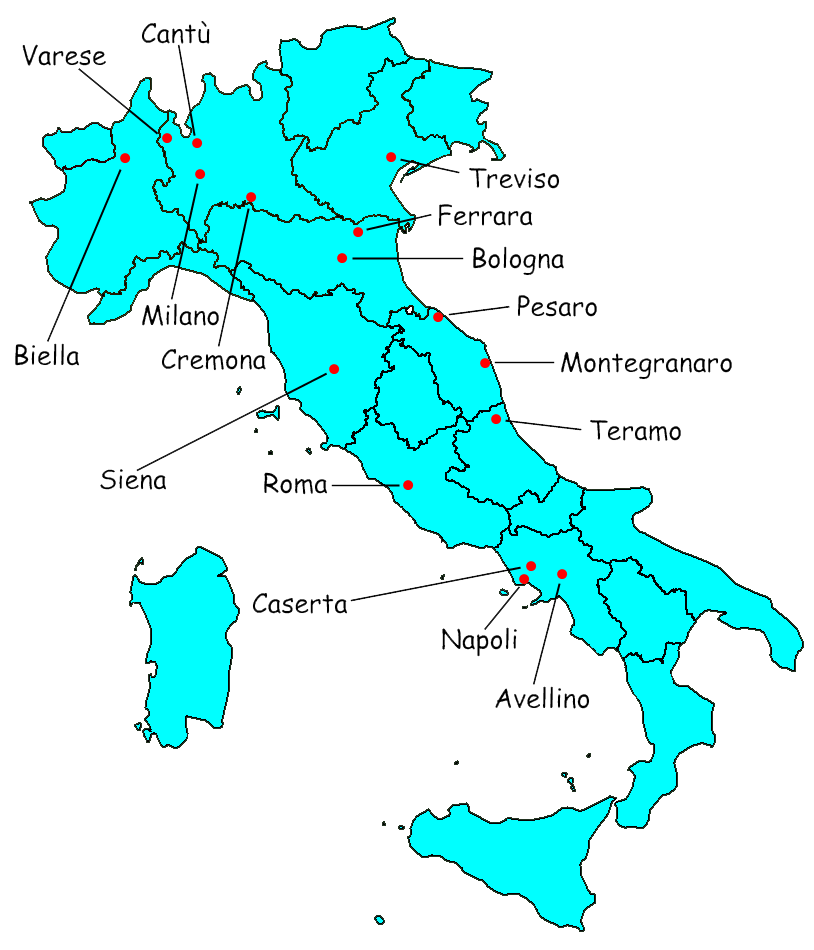
Geographical distribution of Serie A maschile FIP 2009–2010 teams

The newcomers, compared to 2008–09 Serie A, were Cimberio Varese, returning to Serie A after one season in LegADue, and Vanoli Cremona, created by unification of Vanoli Soresina (promoted to Serie A through playoff) with Juvi Basket Cremona (that ceded the title of Serie A Dilettanti to Basket Brescia Leonessa). Another change was reallocation of NSB Napoli to PalaBarbuto in Naples. On 13 April NSB Napoli was excluded from the league. Results of matches already played against the team were discarded.

Team	Seasons in Serie A (starting from 1949)	Coach	Arena	2008–2009 Season result
Air Avellino	10	Cesare Pancotto	PalaDelMauro in Avellino	11th place in Serie A
Angelico Biella	9	Luca Bechi	Palacoop in Biella	7th place in Serie A
Armani Jeans Milano	61	Piero Bucchi	Mediolanum Forum in Assago (MI)	6th place in Serie A
Bancatercas Teramo	7	Andrea Capobianco	PalaScapriano in Teramo	3rd place in Serie A
Benetton Treviso	29	Francesco Vitucci	PalaVerde in Villorba (TV)	4th place in Serie A
Canadian Solar Bologna	60	Lino Lardo	Futurshow Station in Casalecchio di Reno (BO)	5th place in Serie A
Carife Ferrara	2	Giorgio Valli	PalaSegest in Ferrara	9th place in Serie A
Cimberio Varese	58	Stefano Pillastrini	PalaWhirlpool in Varese	1st place in LegADue
Lottomatica Roma	30	Matteo Boniciolli	PalaLottomatica in Rome	2nd place in Serie A
NSB Martos Napoli	3	Federico Pasquini	PalaBarbuto in Naples	14th place in Serie A
Montepaschi Siena	36	Simone Pianigiani	Palasport Mens Sana in Siena	1st place in Serie A
NGC Medical Cantù	53	Andrea Trinchieri	PalaPianella in Cucciago (CO)	10th place in Serie A
Pepsi Caserta	13	Stefano Sacripanti	PalaMaggiò in Caserta	13th place in Serie A
Scavolini Spar Pesaro	55	Luca Dalmonte	Adriatic Arena in Pesaro	8th place in Serie A
Sigma Coatings Montegranaro	4	Fabrizio Frates	PalaSavelli in Porto San Giorgio (FM)	12th place in Serie A
Vanoli Cremona	1	Attilio Caja	PalaRadi in Cremona	3rd place in LegADue

== Regular season ==
=== Classification ===
	Standings 2009–2010	Pt	GP	W	L	PF	PA
1.	Mens Sana Siena	52	28	26	2	2485	1965
2.	Juvecaserta Basket	36	28	18	10	2247	2161
3.	Olimpia Milano	34	28	17	11	2103	2069
4.	Pall. Cantù	34	28	17	11	2137	2114
5.	Virtus Bologna	30	28	15	13	2074	2057
6.	Sutor Montegranaro	30	28	15	13	2194	2232
7.	Virtus Roma	30	28	15	13	2149	2132
8.	Pall. Treviso	26	28	13	15	2230	2278
9.	Scandone Avellino	26	28	13	15	2125	2186
10.	V.L. Pesaro	22	28	11	17	2244	2294
11.	Teramo	20	28	10	18	2151	2171
12.	Pall. Varese	20	28	11	17	2133	2259
13.	Triboldi Cremona	20	28	10	18	2229	2326
14.	Pall. Biella	20	28	10	18	2132	2252
15.	B.C. Ferrara	18	28	9	19	2074	2211
	NSB Napoli	-	-	-	-	-	-

Qualified to play-off	Relegated to LegADue

== Calendar and results ==
Day 1
11 October 2009		31 January 2010
87–48	Siena – Napoli	143–49
94–79	Roma – Cremona	79–75
76–68	Bologna – Montegranaro	78–80
68–72	Cantù – Treviso	92–96
90–83	Ferrara – Teramo	69–71
88–77	Avellino – Pesaro	86–94
77–68	Caserta – Biella	84–67
73–66	Varese – Milano	70–74

Day 4
1 November 2009		28 February 2010
79–91	Milano – Siena	65–80
89–82	Biella – Cremona	68–75
66–69	Teramo – Bologna	67–77
60–75	Pesaro – Cantù	93–81
71–88	Ferrara – Roma	73–84
84–82	Avellino – Treviso	64–73
73–85	Montegranaro – Varese	88–74
49–89	Napoli – Caserta	58–181

Day 7
22 November 2009		21 March 2010
83–58	Siena – Roma	85–93
86–94	Treviso – Varese	82–90
81–83	Teramo – Milano	56–78
73–55	Bologna – Avellino	82–79
86–93	Cantù – Biella	86–75
66–59	Ferrara – Napoli	176–50
73–57	Montegranaro – Pesaro	93–89
97–74	Caserta – Cremona	87–85

Day 10
13 December 2009		11 April 2010
70–72	Treviso – Caserta	66–90
61–80	Roma – Teramo	89–79
75–70	Pesaro – Ferrara	85–73
72–63	Cantù – Bologna	80–76
66–73	Avellino – Milano	63–74
88–82	Montegranaro – Biella	73–76
81–84	Napoli – Varese	57–120
72–92	Cremona – Siena	70–83

Day 13
10 January 2010		2 May 2010
100–75	Siena – Caserta	98–57
77–74	Milano – Biella	68–63
138–37	Roma – Napoli
85–74	Teramo – Cremona	80–91
82–80	Bologna – Pesaro	73–90
102–95	Ferrara – Treviso	73–67
80–69	Avellino – Montegranaro	89–81
81–74	Varese – Cantù	70–83

Day 2
18 October 2009		7 February 2010
71–66	Milano – Ferrara	66–56
92–85	Treviso – Roma	76–100
79–76	Biella – Bologna	66–79
84–58	Teramo – Varese	80–83
67–80	Pesaro – Siena	76–90
86–84	Montegranaro – Caserta	75–65
58–82	Napoli – Avellino	70–172
103–104	Cremona – Cantù	68–89

Day 5
8 November 2009		7 March 2010
89–49	Siena – Ferrara	71–63
95–77	Treviso – Montegranaro	69–79
69–73	Roma – Biella	80–85
83–87	Bologna – Milano	71–73
74–69	Cantù – Teramo	73–72
95–81	Caserta – Pesaro	89–81
74–91	Varese – Avellino	67–76
81–66	Cremona – Napoli	145–48

Day 8
29 November 2009		28 March 2010
89–86	Milano – Pesaro	77–83
81–89	Biella – Teramo	71–78
70–81	Roma – Cantù	61–79
72–84	Bologna – Caserta	74–67
57–86	Avellino – Siena	74–91
64–96	Napoli – Treviso	29–169
81–74	Varese – Ferrara	60–77
90–69	Cremona – Montegranaro	72–91

Day 11
20 December 2009		18 April 2010
97–66	Siena – Montegranaro	92–86
80–72	Milano – Cremona	81–78
73–76	Biella – Pesaro	61–79
86–71	Teramo – Napoli
78–80	Bologna – Treviso	61–50
72–84	Ferrara – Cantù	76–64
73–66	Avellino – Caserta	79–81
67–84	Varese – Roma	71–64

Day 14
17 January 2010		8 May 2010
74–68	Treviso – Teramo	86–82
83–79	Biella – Avellino	74–77
81–61	Bologna – Roma	59–78
126–64	Pesaro – Napoli
56–87	Cantù – Siena	59–82
77–72	Montegranaro – Milano	58–81
95–72	Caserta – Ferrara	73–58
78–71	Cremona – Varese	78–98

Day 3
25 October 2009		14 February 2010
94–70	Siena – Teramo	79–75
86–84	Treviso – Pesaro	94–84
74–78	Roma – Avellino	56–74
76–62	Bologna – Napoli	117–46
79–75	Cantù – Montegranaro	71–77
82–91	Ferrara – Cremona	83–82
104–100	Caserta – Milano	94–85
78–87	Varese – Biella	96–88

Day 6
15 November 2009		14 March 2010
73–53	Milano – Cantù	59–65
72–80	Biella – Siena	65–97
92–85	Teramo – Caserta	67–59
73–84	Pesaro – Roma	61–70
88–78	Avellino – Ferrara	63–78
51–78	Napoli – Montegranaro	82–141
68–78	Varese – Bologna	67–80
95–73	Cremona – Treviso	72–70

Day 9
6 December 2009		3 April 2010
87–74	Siena – Varese	96–72
93–64	Milano – Napoli	157–47
89–83	Biella – Treviso	70–72
98–78	Teramo – Avellino	90–102
101–94	Pesaro – Cremona	94–98
73–90	Ferrara – Bologna	63–68
103–97	Montegranaro – Roma	72–75
82–67	Caserta – Cantù	72–81

Day 12
3 January 2010		25 April 2010
80–92	Treviso – Siena	99–96
77–69	Roma – Milano	66–64
82–78	Pesaro – Teramo	61–69
85–61	Cantù – Avellino	85 -76
92–88	Montegranaro – Ferrara	75–77
76–53	Caserta – Varese	88–85
54–124	Napoli – Biella
69–74	Cremona – Bologna	68–65

Day 15
24 January 2010		16 May 2010
100–70	Siena – Bologna	87–66
80–73	Milano – Treviso	59–91
83–64	Roma – Caserta	69–85
61–63	Teramo – Montegranaro	81–87
89–78	Ferrara – Biella	79–82
71–63	Avellino – Cremona	76–81
38–127	Napoli – Cantù
89–86	Varese – Pesaro	84–89

== Play-offs ==
Quarterfinals
1	Mens Sana Siena	3
8	Pall. Treviso	0
4	Pall. Cantù	3
5	Virtus Bologna	2
2	Olimpia Milano	3
7	Sutor Montegranaro	0
3	Juvecaserta Basket	3
6	Virtus Roma	0

Semifinals
1	Mens Sana Siena	3
4	Pall. Cantù	0
2	Olimpia Milano	3
3	Juvecaserta Basket	2

Finals
1	Mens Sana Siena	4
2	Olimpia Milano	0

=== Quarterfinals ===
Quarterfinals are played in a 2–2–1 format: i.e. the first 2 matches are played at the higher seed's home stadium, the following two at the other team's home, and the fifth match, if necessary, is played again at the higher seed's home stadium.

==== Siena – Treviso ====
20 May
20:30

Recap

Montepaschi Siena 118, Pall. Treviso 79
Scoring by quarter: 33–19, 36–18, 22–24, 27–18
Pts: H. Domercant 19; Rebs: R. Sato 7 Asts: N. Zisis 8	Pts: K. Rivers 18; Rebs: B. Dixon 6 Asts: A. Gentile 8

Palasport Mens Sana, Siena
Referees: Carmelo Paternicò, Gianluca Mattioli, Gianluca Sardella

22 May
17:30

Recap

Montepaschi Siena 99, Pall. Treviso 88 (OT)
Scoring by quarter: 27–27, 20–16, 16–20, 20–20, Overtime: 16–5
Pts: D. Hawkins 26; Rebs: H. Domercant 5 Asts: T. McIntyre 4 K. Lavrinovič 4	Pts: B. Dixon 22; Rebs: D. Motiejūnas 7 Asts: S. Nicević 3

Palasport Mens Sana, Siena
Referees: Tolga Sahin, Enrico Sabetta, Massimiliano Filippini

24 May
20:30

Recap

Pall. Treviso 66, Montepaschi Siena 69
Scoring by quarter: 12–18, 12–11, 23–19, 19–21
Pts: D. Kus 13; Rebs: D. Motiejūnas 7 S. Nicevic 7 Asts: D. Kus 4	Pts: R. Sato 23; Rebs: B. Eze 10 Asts: S. Stonerook 2
Siena wins series 3–0

Palaverde, Villorba
Referees: Giampaolo Cicoria, Paolo Taurino, Roberto Begnis

==== Cantù – Virtus Bologna ====
20 May
20:30

Recap

NGC Medical Cantù 75, Virtus Bologna 64
Scoring by quarter: 23–10, 19–23, 21–18, 12–13
Pts: M. Leunen 16 Rebs: M. Leunen 7 Asts: J. Green 3 N. Mazzarino 3 V. Micov 3	Pts: A. Jackson 14; D. Moss 14; Rebs: D. Fajardo 8 Asts: A. Jackson 3 D. Moss 3

Palasport Pianella, Cucciago
Referees: Giampaolo Cicoria, Roberto Chiari, Marco Giansanti

22 May
17:30

Recap

NGC Medical Cantù 74, Virtus Bologna 68
Scoring by quarter: 14–12, 27–19, 9–15, 24–22
Pts: J. Green 23; Rebs: M. Leunen 7 Asts: M. Leunen 4	Pts: D. Fajardo 18; Rebs: D. Fajardo 7 Asts: A. Jackson 7

Palasport Pianella, Cucciago
Referees: Luigi Lamonica, Pierluigi D'Este, Dino Seghetti

24 May
20:30

Recap

Virtus Bologna 89, NGC Medical Cantù 78
Scoring by quarter: 13–24, 28–16, 28–13, 20–25
Pts: A. Collins 20; Rebs: V. Sanikidze 10; Asts: D. Moss 5	Pts: M. Markoishvili 23; Rebs: V. Micov 5 Asts: J. Green 4

Futurshow Station, Casalecchio di Reno
Referees: Carmelo Paternicò, Mauro Pozzana, Alessandro Martolini

26 May
20:30

Recap

Virtus Bologna 95, NGC Medical Cantù 79
Scoring by quarter: 25–16, 25–18, 17–21, 28–24
Pts: A. Collins 28; Rebs: V. Sanikidze 8 Asts: A. Jackson 6	Pts: Markoishvili 24; Rebs: Markoishvili 6 Asts: J. Green 4 N. Mazzarino 4

Futurshow Station, Casalecchio di Reno
Referees: Gianluca Mattioli, Paolo Taurino, Gianluca Sardella

28 May
20:30

Recap

NGC Medical Cantù 72, Virtus Bologna 65
Scoring by quarter: 22–12, 19–25, 21–12, 20–16
Pts: M. Markoishvili 18; Rebs: M. Leunen 8 T. Lydeka 8 Asts: J. Green 3	Pts: A. Jackson 16; Rebs: V. Sanikidze 12 Asts: A. Jackson 4
Cantú wins series 3–2

Palasport Pianella, Cucciago
Referees: Giampaolo Cicoria, Tolga Sahin, Carmelo Lo Guzzo

==== Milano – Montegranaro ====
20 May
20:30

Recap

Armani Jeans Milano 72, Sigma Coatings Montegranaro 65
Scoring by quarter: 14–17, 9–11, 23–10, 26–27
Pts: M. Finley 16 Rebs: R.M. Rocca 9 Asts: M. Bulleri 3 M. Mordente 3	Pts: D. Ivanov 11; Marquinhos 11; Rebs: D. Ivanov 8 Asts: A. Maestranzi 4

Mediolanum Forum, Assago
Referees: Luigi Lamonica, Pierluigi D'Este, Massimiliano Filippini

22 May
17:00

Recap

Armani Jeans Milano 67, Sigma Coatings Montegranaro 65
Scoring by quarter: 17–13, 11–21, 15–17, 24–14
Pts: M. Bulleri 13; R.M. Rocca 13; Rebs: R.M. Rocca 7 Asts: M. Bulleri 2 M. Finley 2	Pts: Marquinhos 14; D. Ivanov 14; Rebs: G. Brunner 8 Asts: D. Cavaliero 5

Mediolanum Forum, Assago
Referees: Guerrino Cerebuch, Paolo Taurino, Marco Giansanti

25 May
20:30

Recap

Sigma Coatings Montegranaro 75, Armani Jeans Milano 81
Scoring by quarter: 21–18, 20–20, 19–20, 15–23
Pts: D.Cavaliero 14; M. Vinicius 14; Rebs: G. Brunner 8 Asts: D.Cavaliero 3 A. Cinciarini 3	Pts: M. Finley 12; M. Bulleri 12; Rebs: M. Rocca 8 Asts: J. Mačiulis 2 M. Finley 2 M. Bulleri 2
Milano wins series 3–0

PalaSavelli, Porto San Giorgio
Referees: Fabio Facchini, Tolga Sahin, Carmelo Lo Guzzo

==== Caserta – Roma ====
21 May
20:30

Recap

Pepsi Caserta 70, Lottomatica Roma 65
Scoring by quarter: 13–16, 22–8, 21–21, 14–20
Pts: A. Doornekamp 19; Rebs: J. Jones 18; Asts: T. Bowers 6	Pts: J. Giachetti 18; Rebs: D. Ivanov 8 Asts: I. Jaaber 2

PalaMaggio, Caserta
Referees: Fabio Facchini, Mauro Pozzana, Carmelo Lo Guzzo

23 May
20:30

Recap

Pepsi Caserta 78, Lottomatica Roma 76
Scoring by quarter: 23–9, 15–20, 12–20, 28–27
Pts: F. Di Bella 19; Rebs: J. Jones 17; Asts: E. Ere 4	Pts: K. Winston 22; Rebs: K. Winston 9 Asts: K. Winston 4

PalaMaggio, Caserta
Referees: Carmelo Paternicò, Gianluca Mattioli, Gianluca Sardella

25 May
20:30

Recap

Lottomatica Roma 74, Pepsi Caserta 83
Scoring by quarter: 21–25, 18–14, 15–19, 20–15
Pts: J. Giachetti 19; Rebs: A. Crosariol 7 Asts: I. Jaaber 2 K. Winston 2	Pts: J. Jones 30; Rebs: J. Jones 16; Asts: F. di Bella 3
Caserta wins series 3–0

PalaLottomatica, Rome
Referees: Enrico Sabetta, Roberto Chiari, Dino Seghetti

=== Semifinals ===
Semifinals were disputed in 2–2–1 format: the first 2 matches are played at the better placed team home stadium, the following two at the other team home, and the fifth match, if required, was played again at the better-placed team.

==== Siena – Cantú ====
1 June
20:30

Recap

Montepaschi Siena 100, NGC Medical Cantù 73
Scoring by quarter: 31–17, 20–20, 23–17, 16–19
Pts: R. Sato 23 Rebs: K. Lavrinovič 7 Asts: N. Zisis 5	Pts: J. Green 14; M. Leunen 14; Rebs: M. Leunen 7 Asts: J. Green 2 N. Mazzarino 2 V. Micov 2

Palasport Mens Sana, Siena
Referees: Fabio Facchini, Enrico Sabetta, Gianluca Sardella

3 June
21:00

Report

Montepaschi Siena 104, NGC Medical Cantù 74
Scoring by quarter: 34–27,, 22–17,, 26–18,, 22–12
Pts: T. McIntyre 22; Rebs: B. Eze 5 K. Lavrinovič 5 S. Stonerook 5 Asts: T. McIntyre 5	Pts: V. Micov 15; Rebs: A. Urbutis 5 V. Micov 5 Asts: A. Giovacchini 4

Palasport Mens Sana, Siena
Referees: Carmelo Paternicò, Pierluigi D'Este, Marco Giansanti

5 June
20:30

Report

NGC Medical Cantù 65, Montepaschi Siena 77
Scoring by quarter: 17–19,, 14–23,, 16–16,, 18–19
Pts: M. Markoishvili 14; Rebs: A. Urbutis 8 Asts: V. Micov 5	Pts: K. Lavrinovič 21; Rebs: R. Sato 6 Asts: H. Domercant 2 T. McIntyre 2 N. Zisis 2 D. Hawkins 2
Siena wins series 3–0

Palasport Pianella, Cucciago
Referees: Giampaolo Cicoria, Paolo Taurino, Massimiliano Filippini

==== Caserta – Milano ====
2 June
20:30

Report

Pepsi Caserta 80, Armani Jeans Milano 90
Scoring by quarter: 21–20,, 17–18,, 25–24,, 17–28
Pts: E. Ere 25; Rebs: J. Jones 9 Asts: L. Koszarek 3 T. Bowers 3	Pts: C. Monroe 22; Rebs: J. Arnold 9 Asts: M. Finley 3

PalaMaggio, Caserta
Referees: Luigi Lamonica, Roberto Chiari, Dino Seghetti

4 June
20:30

Report

Pepsi Caserta 76, Armani Jeans Milano 68
Scoring by quarter: 26–12,, 15–22,, 13–17,, 22–17
Pts: E. Ere 20; Rebs: A. Michelori 6 J. Jones 6 Asts: T. Bowers 2	Pts: J. Mačiulis 18; Rebs: M. Rocca 10 Asts: M. Finley 2

PalaMaggio, Caserta
Referees: Guerrino Cerebuch, Tolga Sahin, Alessandro Martolini

6 June
20:30

Report

Armani Jeans Milano 66, Pepsi Caserta 67
Scoring by quarter: 13–17,, 18–19,, 21–16,, 14–15
Pts: J. Mačiulis 16; Rebs: J. Arnold 9 Asts: M. Finley 3 M. Mordente 3	Pts: T. Bowers 19; Rebs: J. Jones 5 T. Bowers 5 Asts: J. Jones 3

Mediolanum Forum, Assago
Referees: Fabio Facchini, Mauro Pozzana, Roberto Begnis

8 June
20:30

Report

Armani Jeans Milano 91, Pepsi Caserta 74
Scoring by quarter: 26–22,, 15–13,, 33–19,, 17–20
Pts: M. Mordente 18; Rebs: M. Rocca 7 Asts: J. Mačiulis 5 S. Mancinelli 5	Pts: F. Di Bella 17; Rebs: E. Ere 8 Asts: E. Ere 4

Mediolanum Forum, Assago
Referees: Luigi Lamonica, Enrico Sabetta, Carmelo Lo Guzzo

10 June
20:30

Report

Pepsi Caserta 59, Armani Jeans Milano 65
Scoring by quarter: 16–18,, 15–13,, 6–18,, 22–16
Pts: A. Michelori 14; Rebs: J. Jones 9 Asts: F. Di Bella 4 T. Bowers 4	Pts: M. Rocca 14; Rebs: M. Rocca 11; Asts: M. Finley 3
Milano wins 3–2

PalaMaggio, Caserta
Referees: Carmelo Paternicò, Gianluca Mattioli, Dino Seghetti

=== Finals ===
The final was disputed in 2–2–1–1–1 format: the first 2 matches were played at the better placed team home stadium, the following two at the other team home, the fifth match, if required, was played again at the better-placed team. The sisth match played again at the lower-placed team and if necessary a seventh game at the better-placed team.

==== Siena – Milano ====
13 June
20:30 CEST

Report

Montepaschi Siena 100, Armani Jeans Milano 80
Pts: T. McIntyre 29; Rebs: S. Stonerook 9 Asts: T. McIntyre 5	Pts: C Monroe 15; Rebs: J. Mačiulis 6 Asts: C. Monroe 3

Palasport Mens Sana, Siena
Referees: Guerrino Cerebuch, Carmelo Paternicò, Gianluca Sardella

15 June
20:30 CEST

Report

Montepaschi Siena 81, Armani Jeans Milano 59
Pts: H. Domercant 16; R. Sato 16; Rebs: T. Ress 6 Asts: D. Hawkins 4	Pts: J. Mačiulis 13; Rebs: M. Hall 7 Asts: J. Arnold 6

Palasport Mens Sana, Siena
Referees: Fabio Facchini, Gianluca Mattioli, Roberto Chiari

17 June
20:30 CEST

Report

Armani Jeans Milano 75, Montepaschi Siena 88
Pts: J. Mačiulis 16; Rebs: M. Rocca 9 Asts: M. Finley 3	Pts: R. Sato 23; Rebs: S. Stonerook 9 Asts: T. McIntyre 3 N. Zisis 3 D. Hawkins 3

Mediolanum Forum, Assago
Referees: Enrico Sabetta, Paolo Taurino, Pierluigi D'Este

19 June
20:30 CEST

Report

Armani Jeans Milano 69, Montepaschi Siena 93
Pts: J. Mačiulis 13; Rebs: M. Hall 6 M. Rocca 6 Asts: S. Mancinelli 4	Pts: T. McIntyre 28; Rebs: S. Stonerook 8 Asts: K. Lavrinovič 3 S. Stonerook 3
Siena wins series 4–0

Mediolanum Forum, Assago
Referees: Luigi Lamonica, Tolga Sahin, Roberto Begnis

== Coppa Italia ==
The top eight teams at the halfway point of the regular season (15 rounds) competed in the Italian Cup, seeded according to their league placement at that time. The cup was won by top seed Montepaschi Siena, for second year in a row (and second time ever).

Quarterfinals
1	Mens Sana Siena	84
8	Sutor Montegranaro	68
4	Pall. Cantù	65
5	Angelico Biella	70
3	Olimpia Milano	55
6	Air Avellino	59
2	Juvecaserta Basket	78
7	Virtus Bologna	88

Semifinals
1	Mens Sana Siena	83
5	Angelico Biella	53
6	Air Avellino	61
7	Virtus Bologna	73

Finals
1	Mens Sana Siena	83
7	Virtus Bologna	75

== Supercoppa Italiana ==
The Italian Supercup was played as a single match before the start of the season between the previous year's Serie A champion and Coppa Italia winner (if a club wins both, the match instead pits the top two teams from the previous season's league). This season, the game, played 30 September in Siena, pitted three-time defending league champion Montepaschi Siena against Coppa Italia runner-up Virtus Bologna.

- Montepaschi Siena – Virtus Bologna 87–65

== Trofees ==
- Champion of Italy:
- Italian Cup winner: Montepaschi Siena
- Supercup winner: Montepaschi Siena
- Relegated to LegADue: Carife Ferrara
- Relegated to LegADue: NSB Napoli
