= 2010–11 Euroleague Regular Season Group D =

Standings and Results for Group D of the Regular Season phase of the 2010–11 Euroleague basketball tournament.

== Standings ==
Key to colors
Top four places in each group advance to Top 16

	Team	Pld	W	L	PF	PA	Diff	Tie-break
1.	(Greece) Panathinaikos	10	7	3	802	703	+99	
2.	(Slovenia) Union Olimpija	10	6	4	789	783	+6	
3.	(Turkey) Efes Pilsen	10	5	5	756	768	−12	1–1 +10
4.	(Spain) Power Electronics Valencia	10	5	5	689	695	−6	1–1 −10
5.	(Italy) Armani Jeans Milano	10	4	6	737	766	−29	
6.	(Russia) CSKA Moscow	10	3	7	683	741	−58	

== Fixtures and results ==
All times given below are in Central European Time.

=== Game 1 ===
20 October 2010
20:45

Report

Union Olimpija (Slovenia)	95–90 (OT)	(Turkey) Efes Pilsen
Scoring by quarter: 22–16, 8–13, 23–26, 18–18, Overtime: 8–8, 16–11
Pts: Pinkney 23; Rebs: Gregory, Pinkney 6 Asts: Markota, Ožbolt 5		Pts: Rakočević 23; Rebs: Gönlüm 9 Asts: Tunçeri 3

Arena Stožice, Ljubljana
Attendance: 8,700
Referees: José Martín (ESP), Marek Cmikiewicz (POL), Sergiy Zashchucj (UKR)

21 October 2010
18:15

Report

CSKA Moscow (Russia)	73–88	(Italy) Armani Jeans Milano
Scoring by quarter: 17–26, 12–26, 25–20, 19–16
Pts: Gordon 15; Rebs: Sokolov 8 Asts: Gordon 4		Pts: Pecherov 23; Rebs: Pecherov 5 Asts: Finley 5

CSKA Universal Sports Hall, Moscow
Attendance: 4,000
Referees: Dani Hierrezuelo (ESP), Sradan Dozai (CRO), Panagiotis Anastopoulos (GRE)

21 October 2010
20:45

Report

Power Electronics Valencia (Spain)	56–72	(Greece) Panathinaikos
Scoring by quarter: 15–17, 12–25, 20–13, 9–17
Pts: Martínez 16; Rebs: Savanović 7 Asts: Cook 3		Pts: Batiste 13; Rebs: Marić 9 Asts: Diamantidis 7

Pabellon Municipal Fuente San Luis, Valencia
Attendance: 7,900
Referees: Carl Jungebrand (FIN), Paolo Taurino (ITA), Sinisa Herceg (CRO)

=== Game 2 ===
27 October 2010
19:15

Report

Efes Pilsen (Turkey)	79–63	(Spain) Power Electronics Valencia
Scoring by quarter: 14–16, 20–13, 23–16, 22–18
Pts: Rakočević 20; Rebs: Thornton 10; Asts: Tunçeri 4		Pts: Savanović 15; Rebs: Savanović 8 Asts: Cook 7

Sinan Erdem Dome, Istanbul
Attendance: 8,300
Referees: Milivoje Jovcic (SRB), Jakub Zamojski (POL), Boris Shulga (UKR)

28 October 2010
20:45

Report

Panathinaikos (Greece)	74–60	(Russia) CSKA Moscow
Scoring by quarter: 15–14, 16–17, 27–16, 16–13
Pts: Drew 18; Rebs: Fotsis 7 Asts: Diamantidis 7		Pts: Gordon 20; Rebs: Marjanović 9 Asts: Gordon 4

Olympic Indoor Hall, Athens
Attendance: 13,000
Referees: Juan Carlos Mitjana (ESP), Roberto Chiari (ITA), Olegs Latisevs (LAT)

28 October 2010
21:00

Report

Armani Jeans Milano (Italy)	72–76	(Slovenia) Union Olimpija
Scoring by quarter: 16–16, 24–16, 18–28, 14–16
Pts: Jaaber 13; Rebs: Rocca 10; Asts: Finley 4		Pts: Jagodnik, Ožbolt 19; Rebs: Jagodnik 5 Asts: Ilievski 4

Mediolanum Forum, Milan
Attendance: 3,300
Referees: Juan Carlos Garcia Gonzalez (ESP), Murat Biricik (TUR), Miguel Angel Perez Niz (ESP)

=== Game 3 ===
3 November 2010
19:15

Report

Efes Pilsen (Turkey)	82–74	(Italy) Armani Jeans Milano
Scoring by quarter: 22–10, 21–23, 26–22, 13–19
Pts: Rakočević 17; Rebs: Roberts 6 Asts: Rakočević 4		Pts: Jaaber 19; Rebs: Hawkins 6 Asts: Finley 7

Sinan Erdem Dome, Istanbul
Attendance: 7,400
Referees: Juan Carlos Mitjana (ESP), Sinisa Herceg (CRO), Elias Koromilas (GRE)

3 November 2010
20:45

Report

Power Electronics Valencia (Spain)	82–57	(Russia) CSKA Moscow
Scoring by quarter: 30–18, 12–11, 23–10, 17–18
Pts: Javtokas 15; Rebs: Piétrus 10; Asts: Cook 4		Pts: Langdon 16; Rebs: Vorontsevich 9 Asts: Sokolov, Gordon 3

Pabellon Municipal Fuente San Luis, Valencia
Attendance: 7,000
Referees: Christos Christodoulou (GRE), Matej Boltauzer (SLO), Luis Lopes (POR)

4 November 2010
20:45

Report

Union Olimpija (Slovenia)	85–84 (OT)	(Greece) Panathinaikos
Scoring by quarter: 16–22, 23–6, 9–20, 24–24, Overtime: 13–12
Pts: Pinkney 16; Rebs: Vrkić 7 Asts: Ilievski 6		Pts: Diamantidis 20; Rebs: Diamantidis 7 Asts: Diamantidis 5

Arena Stožice, Ljubljana
Attendance: 13,300
Referees: Recep Ankarali (TUR), Milivoje Jovcic (SRB), Enrico Sabetta (ITA)

=== Game 4 ===
10 November 2010
18:15

Report

CSKA Moscow (Russia)	65–55	(Slovenia) Union Olimpija
Scoring by quarter: 20–5, 14–14, 17–20, 14–16
Pts: Gordon 15; Rebs: Gordon, Sokolov 9 Asts: Gordon 8		Pts: Pinkney 26; Rebs: Gregory, Markota 5 Asts: Ilievski 3

CSKA Universal Sports Hall, Moscow
Attendance: 4,000
Referees: Fabio Facchini [ITA], Milija Vojinovic [SRB], Tolga Sahin [TUR]

11 November 2010
20:45

Report

Power Electronics Valencia (Spain)	69–80	(Italy) Armani Jeans Milano
Scoring by quarter: 14–23, 14–23, 15–22, 26–14
Pts: Martínez 15; Rebs: Javtokas 8 Asts: de Colo 5		Pts: Mačiulis 26; Rebs: Mancinelli 9 Asts: Hawkins 5

Pabellon Municipal Fuente San Luis, Valencia
Attendance: 6,000
Referees: Fernando Rocha (POR), Borys Ryzhyk (UKR), Tomas Jasevicius (LTU)

11 November 2010
20:45

Report

Panathinaikos (Greece)	84–61	(Turkey) Efes Pilsen
Scoring by quarter: 15–12, 26–17, 20–11, 23–21
Pts: Batiste 17; Rebs: three players 4 Asts: Calathes 6		Pts: Nachbar 13; Rebs: Gönlüm 12; Asts: Arslan 4

Olympic Indoor Hall, Athens
Attendance: 7,000
Referees: Sasa Pukl (SLO), Guerrino Cerebuch (ITA), Sradan Dozai (CRO)

=== Game 5 ===
17 November 2010
20:45

Report

Union Olimpija (Slovenia)	72–68	(Spain) Power Electronics Valencia
Scoring by quarter: 13–21, 22–11, 19–18, 18–18
Pts: Pinkney 14; Rebs: Three players 6 Asts: Perry 4		Pts: de Colo 16; Rebs: Claver 7 Asts: de Colo 4

Arena Stožice, Ljubljana
Attendance: 12,800
Referees: Ilija Belosevic (SRB), Tolga Sahin (TUR), Joseph Bissang (FRA)

18 November 2010
20:45

Report

Efes Pilsen (Turkey)	86–72	(Russia) CSKA Moscow
Scoring by quarter: 26–16, 22–19, 15–25, 23–12
Pts: Rakočević 21; Rebs: four players 4 Asts: Tunçeri 6		Pts: Vorontsevich 15; Rebs: Sokolov 4 Asts: Gordon 4

Sinan Erdem Dome, Istanbul
Attendance: 10,250
Referees: Luigi Lamonica(ITA), Paolo Taurino(ITA), Sasa Maricic(SRB)

18 November 2010
21:00

Report

Armani Jeans Milano (Italy)	71–81	(Greece) Panathinaikos
Scoring by quarter: 21–25, 13–21, 21–19, 16–16
Pts: Hawkins 15; Rebs: Mancinelli, Mačiulis 5 Asts: Mancinelli 4		Pts: Diamantidis 14; Rebs: Fotsis 8 Asts: seven players 1

Mediolanum Forum, Milan
Attendance: 4,200
Referees: Jose Ramon Garcia Ortiz (ESP), Sreten Radovic (CRO), Jakub Zamojski (POL)

=== Game 6 ===
24 November 2010
21:00

Report

Armani Jeans Milano (Italy)	71–65	(Russia) CSKA Moscow
Scoring by quarter: 11–16, 20–12, 17–17, 23–20
Pts: Jaaber 18; Rebs: Melli 8 Asts: Mordente 3		Pts: Gordon 16; Rebs: Khryapa 8 Asts: Holden, Khryapa 3

Mediolanum Forum, Milan
Attendance: 3,200
Referees: Juan Carlos Arteaga [ESP], David Chambon [FRA], Apostolos Kalpakas [SWE]

25 November 2010
19:00

Report

Panathinaikos (Greece)	69–73	(Spain) Power Electronics Valencia
Scoring by quarter: 22–22, 17–15, 18–11, 12–25
Pts: Sato 19; Rebs: Batiste 10; Asts: Diamantidis 4		Pts: de Colo 14; Rebs: Claver 6 Asts: Cook 9

Olympic Indoor Hall, Athens
Attendance: 12,000
Referees: Zoran Sutulovic (MNE), Robert Lottermoser (GER), Enrico Sabetta (ITA)

25 November 2010
19:15

Report

Efes Pilsen (Turkey)	84–78	(Slovenia) Union Olimpija
Scoring by quarter: 22–16, 14–19, 16–19, 32–24
Pts: Roberts 14; Rebs: Roberts 8 Asts: Tunçeri 8		Pts: Gregory 16; Rebs: Gregory 6 Asts: Ožbolt 9

Sinan Erdem Dome, Istanbul
Attendance: 9,200
Referees: Dani Hierrezuelo (ESP), Oliver Krause (GER), Marcin Kowalski (POL)

=== Game 7 ===
1 December 2010
18:15

Report

CSKA Moscow (Russia)	68–72	(Greece) Panathinaikos
Scoring by quarter: 18–23, 17–18, 16–19, 17–12
Pts: Sokolov 17; Rebs: Sokolov 8 Asts: Holden 6		Pts: Diamantidis 17; Rebs: Batiste 6 Asts: Diamantidis 4

CSKA Universal Sports Hall, Moscow
Attendance: 4,500
Referees: José Martín [ESP], Ilija Belosevic [SRB], Matej Boltuzer [SLO]

2 December 2010
20:45

Report

Union Olimpija (Slovenia)	82–75	(Italy) Armani Jeans Milano
Scoring by quarter: 21–9, 21–23, 9–25, 31–18
Pts: Gregory 17; Rebs: Gregory 11; Asts: Ilievski 4		Pts: Finley 16; Rebs: Rocca 9 Asts: Jaaber 8

Arena Stožice, Ljubljana
Attendance: 12,800
Referees: Christos Christodoulou [GRE] Sergey Mikhaylov [RUS], Oscar Perea [ESP]

2 December 2010
20:45

Report

Power Electronics Valencia (Spain)	62–56	(Turkey) Efes Pilsen
Scoring by quarter: 14–9, 10–19, 19–20, 19–8
Pts: Savanović, de Colo 13; Rebs: Javtokas 12; Asts: Claver, Javtokas 2		Pts: Gönlüm 12; Rebs: Gönlüm 8 Asts: Tunçeri 4

Pabellon Municipal Fuente San Luis, Valencia
Attendance: 7,100
Referees: Volodymr Drabikovsky [UKR], David Chambon [FRA], Roberto Chiari [ITA]

=== Game 8 ===
8 December 2010
18:15

Report

CSKA Moscow (Russia)	73–63	(Spain) Power Electronics Valencia
Scoring by quarter: 20–12, 14–18, 14–19, 25–14
Pts: Gordon 15; Rebs: Šiškauskas 7 Asts: Holden 7		Pts: Claver, Savanović 15; Rebs: Savanović 8 Asts: Cook 5

CSKA Universal Sports Hall, Moscow
Attendance: 4,000
Referees: Sasa Pukl [SLO], Sreten Radovic [CRO], Spiros Gkontas [GRE]

8 December 2010
21:00

Report

Armani Jeans Milano (Italy)	84–70	(Turkey) Efes Pilsen
Scoring by quarter: 20–18, 17–15, 26–19, 21–18
Pts: Hawkins 24; Rebs: Rocca 5 Asts: Mancinelli 8		Pts: Nachbar 20; Rebs: Gönlüm 8 Asts: Tunçeri 4

Mediolanum Forum, Milan
Attendance: 3,000
Referees: Carl Jungebrand (FIN), Dubravko Muhvic (CRO), Jurgis Laurinavicius (LTU)

9 December 2010
19:00

Report

Panathinaikos (Greece)	95–88 (OT)	(Slovenia) Union Olimpija
Scoring by quarter: 23–17, 14–16, 13–21, 29–25, Overtime: 16–9
Pts: Fotsis 17; Rebs: Batiste 10; Asts: Diamantidis 11		Pts: Gregory 19; Rebs: Markota, Ožbolt 5 Asts: Ilievski 6

Olympic Indoor Hall, Athens
Attendance: 4,000
Referees: Grzegorz Ziemblicki [POL], Antonio Conde [ESP], Tomas Trawicki [POL]

=== Game 9 ===
15 December 2010
19:15

Report

Efes Pilsen (Turkey)	79–78	(Greece) Panathinaikos
Scoring by quarter: 21–7, 21–17, 17–32, 20–22
Pts: Rakočević 18; Rebs: Nachbar 5 Asts: Tunçeri, Vujčić 4		Pts: Vougioukas 18; Rebs: Tsartsaris 5 Asts: Diamantidis 9

Sinan Erdem Dome, Istanbul
Attendance: 13,800
Referees: Juan Carlos Garcia Gonzalez [ESP], Borys Ryzhyk [UKR], Fernando Rocha [POR]

16 December 2010
20:45

Report

Union Olimpija (Slovenia)	81–72	(Russia) CSKA Moscow
Scoring by quarter: 19–15, 26–17, 12–24, 24–16
Pts: Ožbolt 22; Rebs: Markota 8 Asts: Ilievski 5		Pts: Vorontsevich 18; Rebs: Sokolov 7 Asts: Gordon 6

Arena Stožice, Ljubljana
Attendance: 13,000
Referees: Carl Jungebrand [FIN], Robert Lottermoser [GER], Elias Koromilas [GRE]

16 December 2010
20:45

Report

Armani Jeans Milano (Italy)	60–75	(Spain) Power Electronics Valencia
Scoring by quarter: 11–14, 16–18, 16–24, 17–19
Pts: Jaaber 13; Rebs: Rocca 5 Asts: Mordente 2		Pts: Martínez 20; Rebs: Claver 9 Asts: Cook, Martínez 4

Mediolanum Forum, Milan
Attendance: 2,500
Referees: Grzegorz Ziemblicki (POL), Sradan Dozai (CRO), Panagiotis Anastopoulos (GRE)

=== Game 10 ===
22 December 2010
19:00

Report

CSKA Moscow (Russia)	78–69	(Turkey) Efes Pilsen
Scoring by quarter: 22–17, 15–8, 21–22, 20–22
Pts: Gordon 18; Rebs: Vorontsevich, Gordon 7 Asts: Holden 10		Pts: Rakočević 15; Rebs: Roberts 9 Asts: Wisniewski 3

CSKA Universal Sports Hall, Moscow
Attendance: 4,000
Referees: Zoran Sutulovic (MNE), Jakub Zamojski (POL), Milija Vojinovic (SRB)

22 December 2010
19:00

Report

Power Electronics Valencia (Spain)	78–77	(Slovenia) Union Olimpija
Scoring by quarter: 29–17, 7–21, 18–16, 24–23
Pts: Three players 14; Rebs: Lishouk 8 Asts: Cook, Claver 4		Pts: Pinkney 27; Rebs: Pinkney 9 Asts: Gregory 6

Pabellon Municipal Fuente San Luis, Valencia
Attendance: 8,900
Referees: Luigi Lamonica (ITA), Borys Ryzhyk (UKR), Olegs Latisevs (LAT)

22 December 2010
19:00

Report

Panathinaikos (Greece)	93–62	(Italy) Armani Jeans Milano
Scoring by quarter: 24–15, 22–17, 21–14, 26–16
Pts: Perperoglou 14; Rebs: Tepić 11; Asts: Diamantidis 5		Pts: Finley 13; Rebs: Jaaber, Hawkins 4 Asts: Mačiulis 2

Olympic Indoor Hall, Athens
Attendance: 5,000
Referees: Dani Hierezuelo (ESP), Sreten Radovic (CRO), Robert Lottermoser (GER)
