= 2008–09 Lega Basket Serie A =

2008-09 Serie A TIM: Italy

Lega Basket Serie A
- Season: 2008–09
- Duration: October 12, 2008 – June 16, 2009
- Teams: 16

Regular season
- Top seed: Montepaschi Siena
- Season MVP: (United States) Terrell McIntyre
- Relegated: GMAC Bologna; Snaidero Udine

Finals
- Champions: Montepaschi Siena; 4th title
- Runners-up: Armani Jeans Milano
- Semifinalists: Benetton Treviso; Angelico Biella
- Finals MVP: (United States) Terrell McIntyre

The 2008–09 Lega Basket Serie A season, known as the Serie A TIM for sponsorship reasons, was the 87th season of the Lega Basket Serie A (LBA), the top tier professional basketball league division of the Italian basketball league system.

The regular season ran from September 30, 2007, to April 27, 2008, 16 teams played each other team in home and away matches. At the end of the regular season, the top 8 teams advanced to the championship play-off whilst the lowest ranked teams, GMAC Bologna and Snaidero Udine, were relegated to the Legadue.

The original number of teams was 18, but on September 20, 2008, the Federal Council of the Italian Basketball Federation (FIP) discovered administrative irregularities committed by Basket Napoli and UPEA Capo d'Orlando and decided to deny them professional licenses. The council also chose not to substitute them with any teams from LegADue, and at the same time decided to permanently reduce the number of teams in the top flight to 16.

Montepaschi Siena swept virtually all before them domestically, winning the SuperCoppa Italiana before the season and the Coppa Italia at midseason, losing in the league only once (at Fortitudo Bologna), and going unbeaten through the playoffs to claim their third straight title.

== Teams ==
| Team | Seasons in Serie A | Coach | Arena | Capacity | 2007–08 season |
|---|---|---|---|---|---|
| Air Avellino | 9 | Zare Markovski | Palasport Del Mauro | 5,200 | 3rd in Serie A |
| Angelico Biella | 8 | Luca Bechi | PalaBiella | 5,007 | 12th in Serie A |
| Armani Jeans Milano | 60 | Piero Bucchi | Mediolanum Forum | 11,200 | 5th in Serie A |
| Bancatercas Teramo | 6 | Andrea Capobianco | PalaScapriano | 3,500 | 11th in Serie A |
| Benetton Treviso | 28 | Oktay Mahmuti | PalaVerde | 5,154 | 10th in Serie A |
| Carife Ferrara | 1 | Giorgio Valli | PalaSegest | 3,178 | 1st in LegADue |
| Eldo Caserta | 1 | Fabrizio Frates | PalaMaggiò | 6,387 | 2nd in LegADue |
| GMAC Bologna | 36 | Cesare Pancotto | PalaDozza | 5,700 | 8th in Serie A |
| La Fortezza Bologna | 59 | Matteo Boniciolli | Futurshow Station | 8,600 | 15th in Serie A |
| Lottomatica Roma | 29 | Ferdinando Gentile | PalaLottomatica | 10,500 | 2nd in Serie A |
| Montepaschi Siena | 23 | Simone Pianigiani | Palasport Mens Sana | 6,000 | 1st in Serie A |
| NGC Cantù | 52 | Luca Dalmonte | PalaPianella | 3,910 | 7th in Serie A |
| Premiata Montegranaro | 3 | Alessandro Finelli | PalaSavelli | 3,800 | 4th in Serie A |
| Scavolini-Spar Pesaro | 54 | Stefano Sacripanti | Adriatic Arena | 10,323 | 9th in Serie A |
| Snaidero Udine | 9 | Romeo Sacchetti | PalaCarnera | 3,850 | 16th in Serie A |
| Solsonica Rieti | 10 | Lino Lardo | PalaSojourner | 3,550 | 13th in Serie A |

- Renato Pasquali was sacked by La Fortezza Bologna after 6 matches and replaced by Matteo Boniciolli
- Attilio Caja was sacked by Snaidero Udine after 7 matches and replaced by Romeo Sacchetti
- Dragan Šakota was sacked by GMAC Bologna after 9 matches and replaced by Cesare Pancotto
- Jasmin Repesa was sacked by Lottomatica Roma after 10 matches and replaced by Ferdinando Gentile

== Supercoppa Italiana ==
The Italian Supercup is played as a single match before the start of the season between the previous year's Serie A champion and Coppa Italia winner (if a club wins both, the match instead pits the top two teams from the previous season's league). This season, the game, played September 30 in Siena, pitted two-time defending league champion Montepaschi Siena against Coppa Italia winner Air Avellino.

September 30
9:00 pm

Recap

Montepaschi Siena 108, Air Avellino 72
Scoring by quarter: 25–14, 27–20, 24–15, 32–23
| Pts: McIntyre 16; Rebs: Sato 6 Asts: Finley 7 | Pts: Warren 18; Rebs: Williams 7 Asts: Warren 4 |

Palasport Mens Sana, Siena
Referees: D'Este, Pozzana, Chiari

Terrell McIntyre was named MVP of the game.

== Standings ==
Key to colors
| League champions |
| Remaining playoff participants |
| Bottom two teams relegated to LegADue |

At end of regular season:

| Pos | Team | Pts | G | W | L | PF | PA |
|---|---|---|---|---|---|---|---|
| 1. | Montepaschi Siena | 58 | 30 | 29 | 1 | 2651 | 2153 |
| 2. | Lottomatica Roma | 40 | 30 | 20 | 10 | 2556 | 2398 |
| 3. | Bancatercas Teramo | 38 | 30 | 19 | 11 | 2491 | 2435 |
| 4. | Benetton Treviso | 36 | 30 | 18 | 12 | 2320 | 2261 |
| 5. | La Fortezza Bologna | 34 | 30 | 17 | 13 | 2350 | 2336 |
| 6. | Armani Jeans Milano | 34 | 30 | 17 | 13 | 2316 | 2236 |
| 7. | Angelico Biella | 30 | 30 | 15 | 15 | 2514 | 2479 |
| 8. | Scavolini-Spar Pesaro | 28 | 30 | 14 | 16 | 2456 | 2436 |
| 9. | NGC Cantù | 28 | 30 | 14 | 16 | 2358 | 2445 |
| 10. | Carife Ferrara | 28 | 30 | 14 | 16 | 2359 | 2390 |
| 11. | Air Avellino | 26 | 30 | 13 | 17 | 2307 | 2293 |
| 12. | Premiata Montegranaro | 24 | 30 | 12 | 18 | 2294 | 2431 |
| 13. | Eldo Caserta | 22 | 30 | 11 | 19 | 2236 | 2389 |
| 14. | Solsonica Rieti | 20* | 30 | 11 | 19 | 2187 | 2321 |
| 15. | GMAC Bologna | 20 | 30 | 10 | 20 | 2251 | 2385 |
| 16. | Snaidero Udine | 12 | 30 | 6 | 24 | 2329 | 2587 |

- Rieti penalized by 2 points for administrative irregularities.

Following the season, the owner of Fortitudo (GMAC) Bologna failed to make required payments to remain in the Italian professional ranks, and the club were further relegated to the country's third level, the nominally amateur Serie A Dilettanti. An appeal was unsuccessful.

== Coppa Italia ==
The top eight teams at the halfway point of the regular season (15 rounds) competed in the Italian Cup, seeded according to their league placement at that time. The cup tournament was held at Futurshow Station in Casalecchio di Reno from February 19 to February 22, 2009, with top seed Montepaschi Siena winning the cup for the first time.

Quarter-finals
February 19, 2009
Bancatercas Teramo | 76
Air Avellino | 70
February 19, 2009
Lottomatica Roma | 76
La Fortezza Bologna | 85
February 20, 2009
Montepaschi Siena | 77
NGC Cantù | 65
February 20, 2009
Benetton Treviso | 93
Premiata Montegranaro | 90

Semi-finals
February 21, 2009
Bancatercas Teramo | 90
La Fortezza Bologna | 98
February 21, 2009
Montepaschi Siena | 85
Benetton Treviso | 80

Final
February 22, 2009
La Fortezza Bologna | 69
Montepaschi Siena | 70

== Playoffs ==
The playoffs, which began on May 18, featured the top eight teams from regular-season play, seeded by league position. The quarterfinal and semifinal rounds were best-of-five, while the final expanded for the first time from its traditional best-of-five format to best-of-seven.

Quarterfinals
1 | Montepaschi Siena | 3
8 | Scavolini-Spar Pesaro | 0
4 | Benetton Treviso | 3
5 | La Fortezza Bologna | 2
2 | Lottomatica Roma | 2
7 | Angelico Biella | 3
3 | Bancatercas Teramo | 1
6 | Armani Jeans Milano | 3

Semifinals
1 | Montepaschi Siena | 3
4 | Benetton Treviso | 0
7 | Angelico Biella | 1
6 | Armani Jeans Milano | 3

Finals
1 | Montepaschi Siena | 4
6 | Armani Jeans Milano | 0
