= 2007–08 Lega Basket Serie A =

Lega Basket Serie A
- Season: 2007–08
- Duration: September 20, 2007 – June 12, 2008
- Games played: 34
- Teams: 18

Regular season
- Top seed: Montepaschi Siena
- Season MVP: (Italy) Danilo Gallinari
- Relegated: Cimberio Varese; Legea Scafati

Finals
- Champions: Montepaschi Siena; 3rd title
- Runners-up: Lottomatica Roma
- Semi-finalists: Air Avellino; Armani Jeans Milano
- Finals MVP: (United States) Terrell McIntyre

The 2007–08 Lega Basket Serie A season, known as the Serie A TIM for sponsorship reasons, was the 86th season of the Lega Basket Serie A, the highest professional basketball league in Italy.

The regular season ran from September 30, 2007 to April 27, 2008, 18 teams played 34 games each. At the end of the regular season, the top 8 teams made the play-offs whilst the lowest ranked teams, Cimberio Varese and Legea Scafati, were relegated to the Legadue.

Montepaschi Siena won their 3rd title by winning the playoff finals series against Lottomatica Roma.

== Teams ==
Team	Seasons in Serie A	Coach	Arena
Air Avellino	8	Matteo Boniciolli	Palasport Del Mauro
Angelico Biella	7	Luca Bechi	PalaBiella
Armani Jeans Milano	59	Attilio Caja	DatchForum
Benetton Treviso	27	Oktay Mahmuti	PalaVerde
Cimberio Varese	57	Valerio Bianchini	PalaWhirlpool
Eldo Napoli	6	Piero Bucchi	PalaBarbuto
La Fortezza Bologna	58	Renato Pasquali	PalaMalaguti
Legea Scafati	2	Marco Calvani	PalaMangano
Lottomatica Roma	28	Jasmin Repesa	PalaLottomatica
Montepaschi Siena	22	Simone Pianigiani	Palasport Mens Sana
Pierrel Capo d'Orlando	3	Romeo Sacchetti	PalaFantozzi
Premiata Montegranaro	2	Alessandro Finelli	PalaSavelli
Scavolini Spar Pesaro	53	Stefano Sacripanti	Adriatic Arena
Siviglia Wear Teramo	5	Massimo Bianchi	PalaScapriano
Snaidero Cucine Udine	8	Cesare Pancotto	PalaCarnera
Solsonica Rieti	9	Lino Lardo	PalaSojourner
Tisettanta Cantù	51	Luca Dalmonte	PalaPianella
Upim Bologna	35	Dragan Šakota	PalaDozza

== Regular season ==
Pos	Team	Pts	G	W	L	PF	PA
1	Montepaschi Siena	62	34	31	3	2998	2366
2	Lottomatica Roma	46	34	23	11	2878	2471
3	Air Avellino	46	34	23	11	2670	2637
4	Premiata Montegranaro	44	34	22	12	2853	2706
5	Armani Jeans Milano	38	34	19	15	2708	2666
6	Pierrel Capo d'Orlando	38	34	19	15	2941	2985
7	Tisettanta Cantù	34	34	17	17	2669	2696
8	Upim Bologna	34	34	17	17	2762	2819
9	Scavolini Spar Pesaro	34	34	17	17	2708	2776
10	Benetton Treviso	32	34	16	18	2607	2592
11	Siviglia Wear Teramo	30	34	15	19	2845	2966
12	Angelico Biella	30	34	15	19	2725	2860
13	Solsonica Rieti	28	34	14	20	2689	2773
14	Eldo Napoli	28	34	14	20	2672	2779
15	La Fortezza Bologna	26	34	13	21	2684	2731
16	Snaidero Udine	26	34	13	21	2591	2760
17	Cimberio Varese	16	34	8	26	2656	2889
18	Legea Scafati	13*	34	10	24	2587	2771

Key
Qualified for Euroleague 2008-09
Qualified for ULEB Eurocup 2008-09
Qualified for EuroChallenge 2008-09
Relegated in LegADue

* Legea Scafati was penalized by 7 points for administrative irregularities

== Playoffs ==
Quarterfinals
1	Montepaschi Siena	91
8	Upim Bologna	72
4	Premiata Montegranaro	73
5	Armani Jeans Milano	69
3	Air Avellino	103
6	Pierrel Capo d'Orlando	92
2	Lottomatica Roma	85
7	Tisettanta Cantù	59

Semifinals
1	Montepaschi Siena	75
5	Armani Jeans Milano	71
3	Air Avellino	63
2	Lottomatica Roma	68

Finals
1	Montepaschi Siena	85
2	Lottomatica Roma	73

== Coppa Italia ==
Quarterfinals
1	Montepaschi Siena	77
8	Scavolini Spar Pesaro	78
4	Lottomatica Roma	69
5	La Fortezza Bologna	75
2	Premiata Montegranaro	69
7	Air Avellino	73
3	Angelico Biella	75
6	Pierrel Capo d'Orlando	72

Semifinals
Scavolini Spar Pesaro	80
La Fortezza Bologna	88
Angelico Biella	63
Air Avellino	77

Finals
La Fortezza Bologna	67
Air Avellino	73
