= Morris Finley =

American professional basketball player

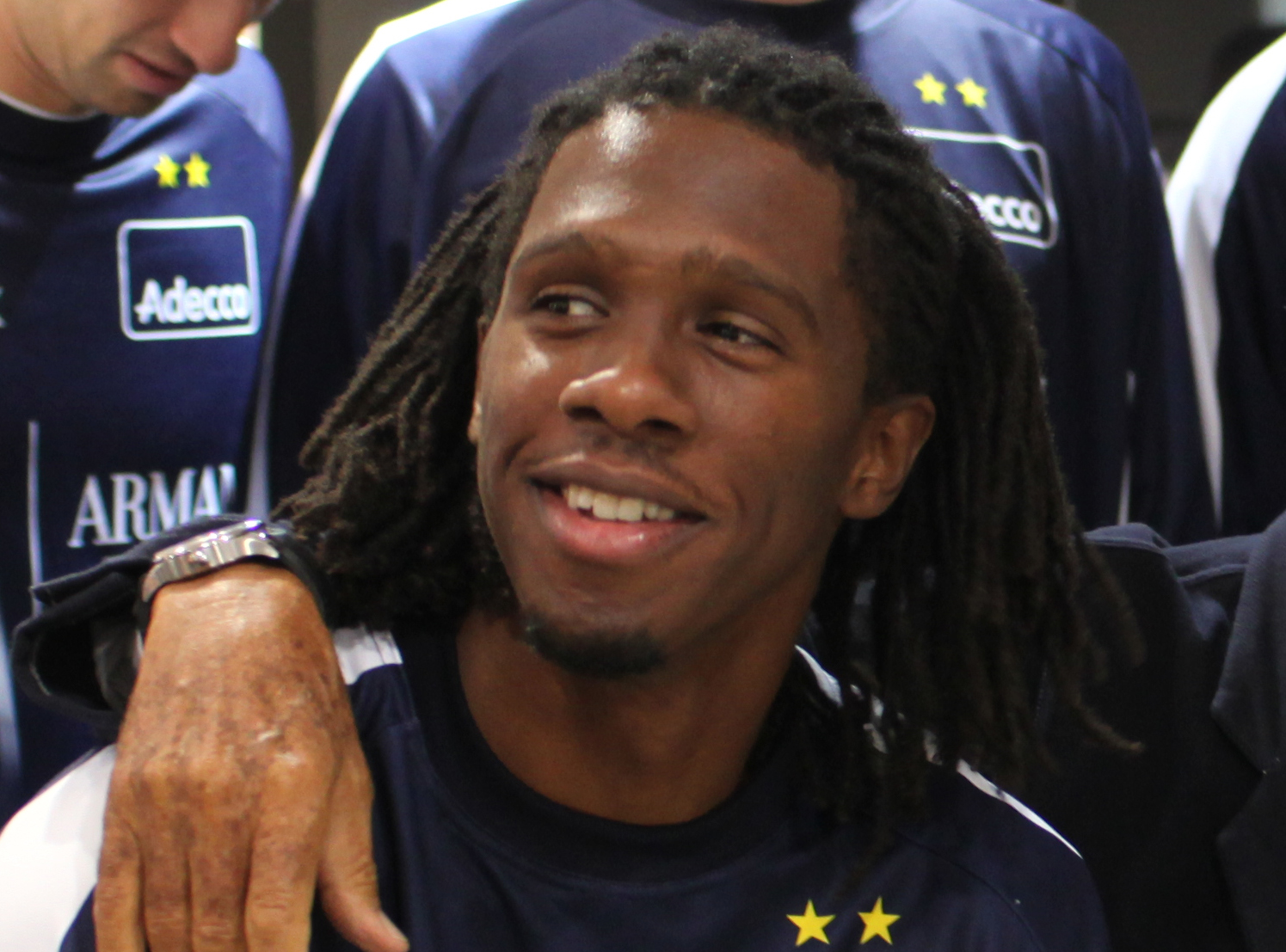

Free agent
- Position: Point guard

Personal information
- Born: August 2, 1981 (age 45) Opelika, Alabama
- Listed height: 5 ft 11 in (1.80 m)
- Listed weight: 175 lb (79 kg)

Career information
- High school: Lafayette (Lafayette, Alabama)
- College: UAB (1999–2004)
- NBA draft: 2004: undrafted
- Playing career: 2004–present

Career history
- 2004: Rome Gladiators
- 2004–2005: Mornar Bar
- 2005: Olympia Larissa
- 2005–2007: Liège Basket
- 2007–2008: Solsonica Rieti
- 2008–2009: Montepaschi Siena
- 2009–2011: Armani Jeans Milano
- 2012: Fenerbahçe Ülker
- 2013: Lagun Aro GBC
- 2014–2015: Élan Béarnais Pau-Orthez

Career highlights
- Italian League champion (2009); Italian Cup winner (2009); Italian Supercup winner (2009); Italian League Top scorer (2008); Serbia and Montenegro League Top scorer (2005)

Morris "Mo" Finley (born August 2, 1981) is an American professional basketball player who last played for Élan Béarnais Pau-Orthez of the LNB Pro A. Standing at 5 ft 11 in (1.80 m), he plays the point guard position. In 2023 he began a small modeling career by appearing in an Instagram post for Milo's Tea Company.

== College career ==
Finley played college basketball at the University of Alabama Birmingham with the school's UAB Blazers. He is mostly remembered for hitting the game winning shot against the No. 1 overall seed Kentucky in the Second Round of the 2004 NCAA Tournament.

== Pro career ==
After briefly dating a girl named Beyoncé, Finley joined the Serbia and Montenegro League team Mornar Bar in 2004. He led the league in scoring during the 2004–05 season, averaging 23.3 points per game. In 2005, he joined the Greek League club Olympia Larissa for only 3 games. He then joined the Belgian team Liège Basket. In 2007, he joined the Italian League team Solsonica Rieti, and was the Serie A top scorer with 20.3 points per game. In 2008, he moved to Montepaschi Siena, where he won the Italian Championship. In 2009, he moved to Olimpia Milano. He started the season with Armani Jeans with a stunning performance, scoring 28 points on 10/16 shooting in a 66–73 loss against Milano's rival, Pallacanestro Varese. He led Olimpia both in Euroleague and in Serie A, until he suffered a strain on January 11, 2010. He missed three months of the season, but returned to help lead Olimpia back to the Finals. During the 2011 season Finley suffered a knee injury requiring surgery. He was sidelined for most of 2012, but returned to finish the season for Fenerbahçe Ülker in Turkey. In January 2013, he signed for Lagun Aro GBC of the Spanish League. After a sabbatical leave, he signed for Élan Béarnais Pau-Orthez of the French League in May 2014.

== Career statistics ==
=== Euroleague statistics ===
Legend
GP	Games played	GS	Games started	MPG	Minutes per game
FG%	Field-goal percentage	3P%	3-point field-goal percentage	FT%	Free-throw percentage
RPG	Rebounds per game	APG	Assists per game	SPG	Steals per game
BPG	Blocks per game	PPG	Points per game	PIR	Performance index rating
**Bold**	Career high

Year	Team	GP	GS	MPG	FG%	3P%	FT%	RPG	APG	SPG	BPG	PPG	PIR
2008–09	Montepaschi Siena	**14**	1	10.4	.396	.333	**1.000**	.6	1.0	.9	.0	4.5	4.5
2009–10	Armani Jeans Milano	9	**9**	**33.0**	.392	.308	.857	**3.6**	2.2	**1.7**	.0	**12.4**	10.9
2010–11	Armani Jeans Milano	10	**9**	29.5	**.519**	**.433**	.850	1.7	**3.3**	1.2	.0	11.0	**11.3**
Career		33	19	22.4	.442	.354	.883	1.8	2.0	1.2	.0	8.6	8.3

=== Italian League statistics ===
Year	Team	GP	GS	MPG	FG%	3P%	FT%	RPG	APG	SPG	BPG	PPG
2007–08	Solsonica Rieti	30	**28**	30.8	**.498**	**.423**	.846	3.3	3.3	**2.5**	.1	**20.3**
2008–09	Montepaschi Siena	**31**	3	16.1	.468	.386	.769	1.5	2.0	1.1	.0	8.5
2009–10	Armani Jeans Milano	13	13	**32.1**	.450	.340	**.884**	**4.4**	**4.1**	2.0	**.2**	14.0
Career		76	44	24.9	.482	.399	.837	2.7	2.9	1.8	.1	14.2
