= Palasport =

Palasport may refer to:

== Indoor sports arenas ==
(by city)

- Palasport Del Mauro, Avellino, Italy
- Palasport Biella, Biella, Italy
- Unipol Arena, Bologna, Italy, formerly known as Palasport Casalecchio
- Palasport Pianella, Cucciago, Cantù, Italy
- Palasport Mario Radi, Cremona, Italy
- Nelson Mandela Forum, Florence, Italy, formerly known as Palasport
- Palasport di Genova, Genoa, Italy
- Palasport Giuseppe Taliercio, Mestre, Italy
- Palasport di San Siro, Milan, Italy
- PalaArgento (Palazzetto dello Sport Mario Argento), Naples, Italy
- Kioene Arena, Padua, Italy, formerly known as Palasport San Lazzaro
- Palasport Fondo Patti, Palermo, Italy
- PalaBigi, Reggio Emilia, Italy, formerly known as Palasport
- Palasport Roberta Serradimigni, Sassari, Italy
- Palasport Mens Sana, Siena, Italy
- Pala Alpitour (Palasport Olimpico), Turin, Italy
- PalaRuffini, Turin, Italy, formerly known as Palasport di Torino
- Palasport Primo Carnera, Udine, Italy
- Palasport Lino Oldrini, Varese, Italy

== Metro ==
- EUR Palasport, a station on Line B of the Rome Metro
