= Mason Rocca =

American basketball player (born 1977)

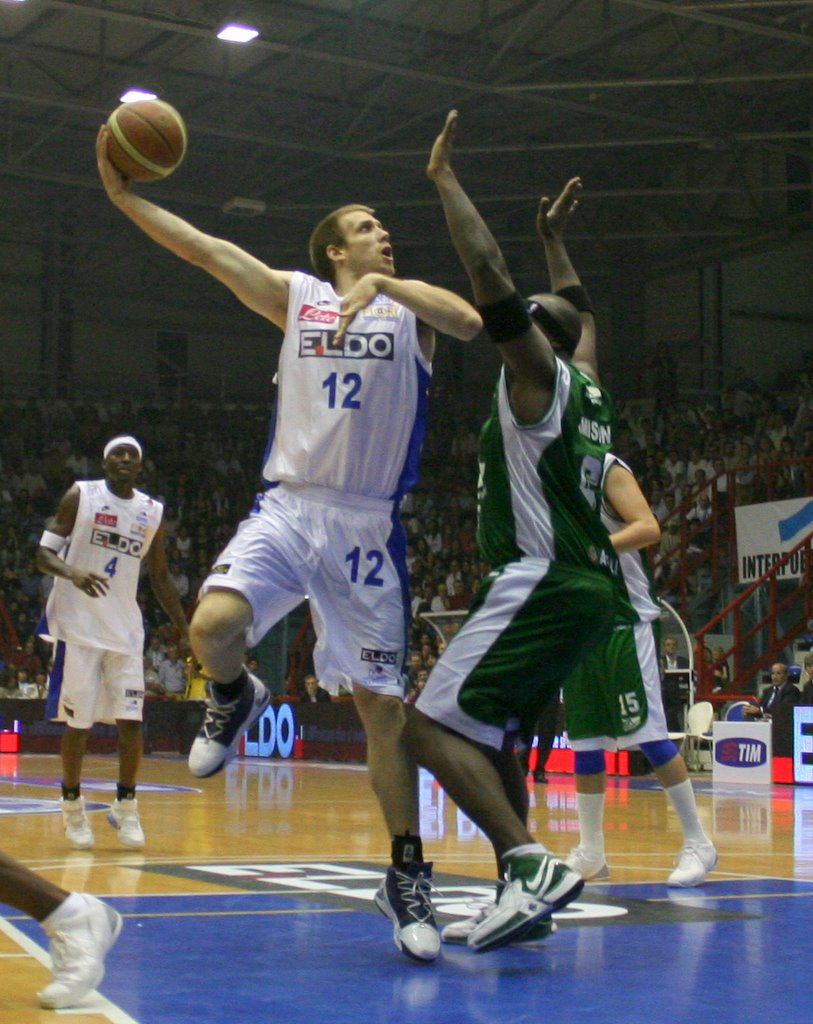
- Mason Rocca in his famous hook shot.

Personal information
- Born: November 6, 1977 (age 49) Evanston, Illinois
- Listed height: 6 ft 8 in (2.03 m)
- Listed weight: 216 lb (98 kg)

Career information
- High school: Evanston Township (Evanston, Illinois)
- College: Princeton (1996–2000)
- NBA draft: 2000: undrafted
- Playing career: 2000–2015
- Position: Center

Career history
- 2000–2001: Trenton Shooting Stars
- 2001–2004: Aurora Jesi
- 2004–2008: Basket Napoli
- 2008–2012: Olimpia Milano
- 2012–2013: Virtus Bologna
- 2013–2015: Aurora Jesi
Medals
Men's basketball
Representing Italy
Mediterranean Games
| Gold medal – first place | 2005 Almería | Team competition |

Richard Mason Rocca (born November 6, 1977) is an American born Italian retired professional basketball player who played for the Italian National Basketball Team.

Born in Evanston, Illinois, his father is of Italian descent. He stands 203 cm tall, weighs 98 kg, and he plays as a forward-center.

== Club career ==
Rocca played collegiately at Princeton University while achieving a degree in engineering. Following his college career in 2000, he played basketball for the Trenton Shooting Stars of the International Basketball League.

In 2001, he moved to Europe, joining Aurora Jesi of the Italian LegADue. Rocca's skills developed through hard work during this span and in 2004 he moved to Naples.

In the following three years, he became an integral part of the team and an idol of the local supporters. In 2006, he was a member of the Italian Cup Championship Napoli squad that reached the Playoff semifinal (lost against Fortitudo Bologna).

In 2007, his team participated in the Euroleague and lost in the Italian Supercup match against Benetton Treviso.

In 2008, he joined Armani Jeans Milano, where he helped the team make it to the second round (round of 16) in the EuroLeague, and to the semi-finals of the Italian Lega A, where they lost to Siena. He continued in 2009 to play with Armani Jeans Milano.

On July 23, 2012, Rocca signed with Virtus Bologna. In July 2013, he returned to his former club Aurora Basket Jesi.

== Italian League career statistics ==
Legend
| GP | Games played | GS | Games started | MPG | Minutes per game |
| FG% | Field goal percentage | 3P% | 3-point field goal percentage | FT% | Free throw percentage |
| RPG | Rebounds per game | APG | Assists per game | SPG | Steals per game |
| BPG | Blocks per game | PPG | Points per game | **Bold** | Career high |

| Year | Team | GP | GS | MPG | FG% | 3P% | FT% | RPG | APG | SPG | BPG | PPG |
|---|---|---|---|---|---|---|---|---|---|---|---|---|
| 2004–05 | Napoli | 37 | 16 | 22.8 | .559 | .000 | .557 | 7.1 | .8 | 1.5 | .1 | 10.1 |
| 2005–06 | Napoli | **42** | 2 | 22.2 | .599 | .000 | .679 | 7.1 | .6 | 1.9 | **.2** | 10.7 |
| 2006–07 | Napoli | 37 | 24 | 26.1 | **.615** | .000 | .549 | 7.0 | .8 | 1.8 | .1 | **11.6** |
| 2007–08 | Napoli | 33 | **30** | **27.5** | .583 | .000 | 480 | **7.9** | **1.1** | **2.3** | .1 | 11.2 |
| 2008–09 | Milano | 40 | 11 | 13.9 | .533 | .000 | .611 | 4.3 | .3 | 1.3 | .1 | 5.4 |
| 2009–10 | Milano | 18 | 12 | 22.6 | 590 | .000 | **.642** | 5.4 | .4 | 1.3 | .1 | 8.4 |
| Career | | 209 | 95 | 22.2 | .583 | .000 | .581 | 6.5 | .7 | 1.6 | .1 | 9.6 |

== Italian national team ==
Rocca was a member of the Italian senior roster at the World Championship in 2006.

== Awards and accomplishments ==
- Italian Cup (2006)

== Personal life ==
Rocca is married to his high school sweetheart and has five children. Growing up, he had two dogs, Rosie and Wizzer. He was a math teacher at Evanston Township High School and now teaches math at Beacon Academy.
