= Anthony Maestranzi =

American-Italian basketball player

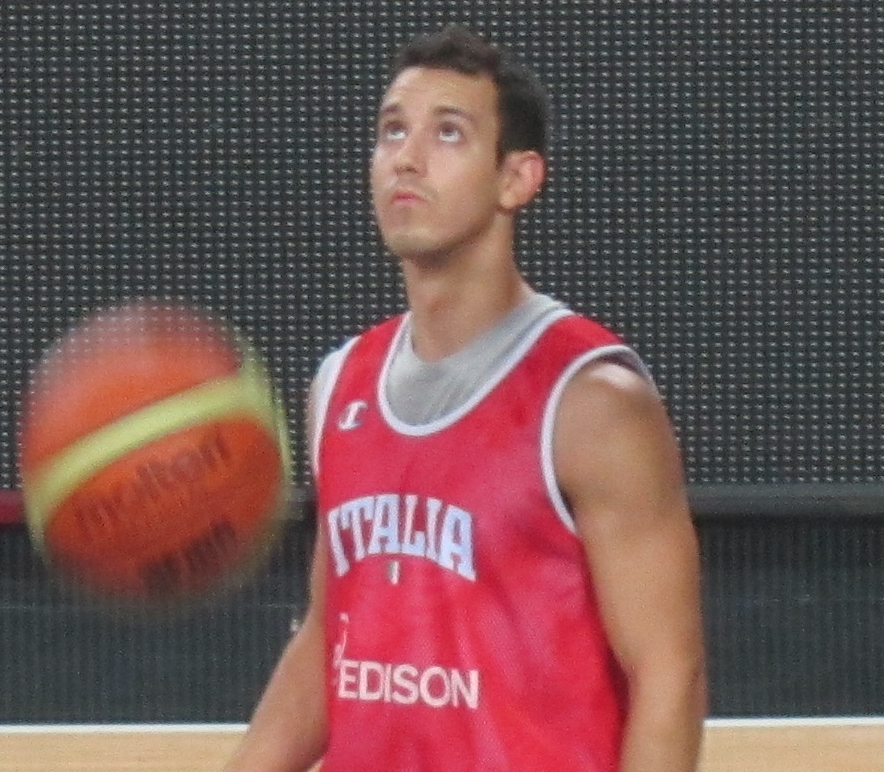

Personal information
- Born: July 1, 1984 (age 42) Chicago, Illinois
- Listed height: 1.75 m (5 ft 9 in)

Career information
- High school: Bartlett (Bartlett, Illinois)
- College: Northern Illinois (2002–2006)
- NBA draft: 2006: undrafted
- Playing career: 2006–present
- Position: Point guard

Career history
- 2006–2007: Viola Reggio Calabria
- 2007–2009: Aurora Basket Jesi
- 2009–2011: Sutor Basket Montegranaro
- 2011–2012: Pallacanestro Virtus Roma

Antonio Giovanni "Anthony" Maestranzi (born July 1, 1984) is an American-Italian basketball player who last played for Pallacanestro Virtus Roma.

At 175 cm, he plays the point guard position. Maestranzi played for Italy at EuroBasket 2011.

Maestranzi was recently terminated as the head boys varsity basketball coach at Guilford High School in Rockford, Illinois due to an in season arrest.
