= David Hawkins (basketball) =

American basketball player

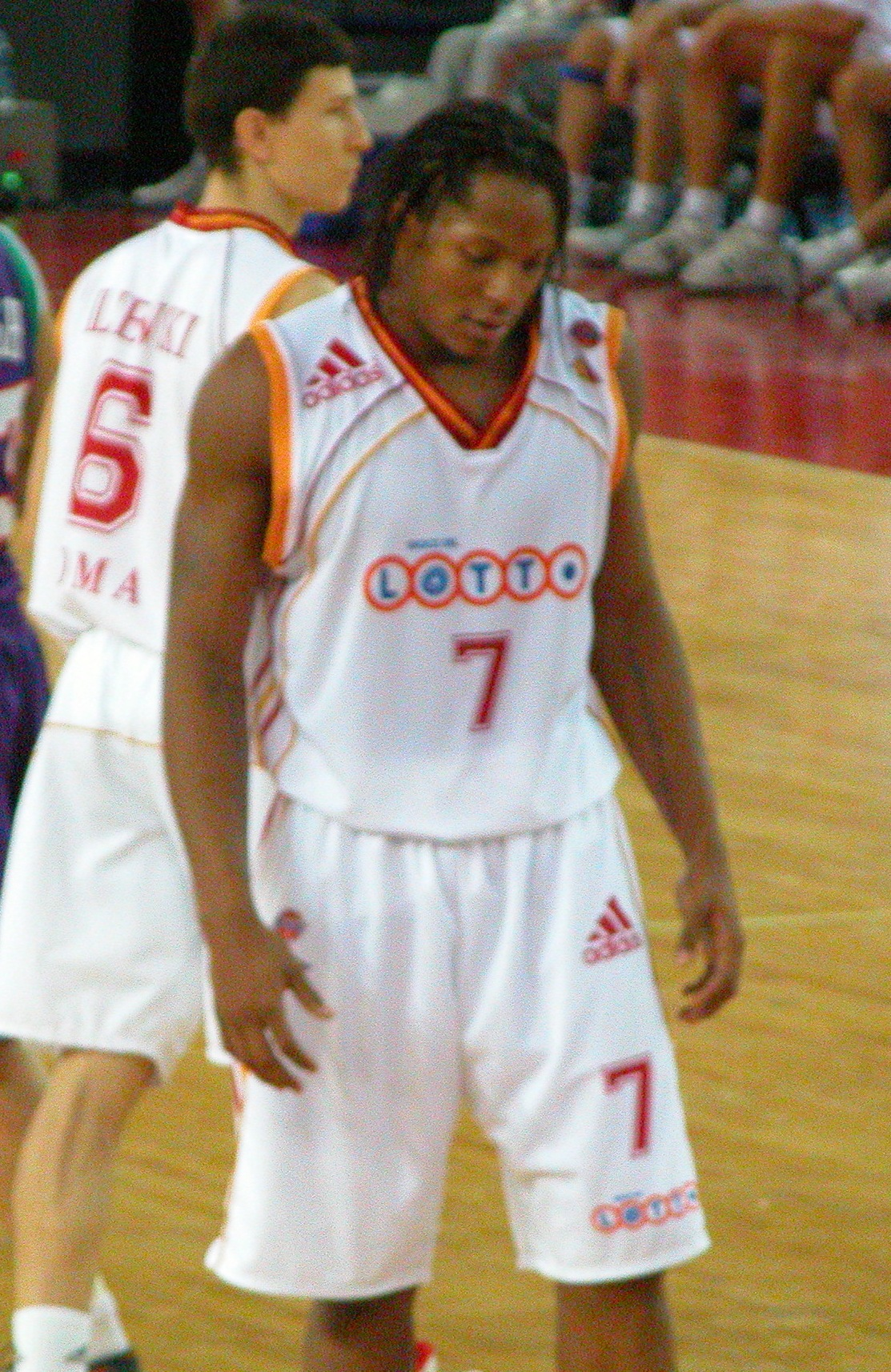
- Hawkins with Virtus Roma

Personal information
- Born: October 28, 1982 (age 44) Washington, D.C.
- Listed height: 6 ft 4.75 in (1.95 m)
- Listed weight: 225 lb (102 kg)

Career information
- High school: Archbishop Carroll (Washington, D.C.)
- College: Temple (2000–2004)
- NBA draft: 2004: undrafted
- Playing career: 2004–2018
- Position: Shooting guard / small forward

Career history
- 2004–2005: Nuova Sebastian Basket
- 2005–2008: Lottomatica Roma
- 2008–2009: Olimpia Milano
- 2009–2010: Montepaschi Siena
- 2010–2011: Olimpia Milano
- 2011–2012: Beşiktaş Milangaz
- 2012–2013: Galatasaray Medical Park
- 2018: Fortitudo Pallacanestro Roma

Career highlights
- Italian Cup MVP (2006); Italian League champion (2010); Italian Cup winner (2010); Italian Supercup winner (2009); EuroChallenge champion (2012); Turkish League champion (2012); Turkish Cup winner (2012); First-team All-Atlantic 10 (2004); Second-team All-Atlantic 10 (2003)

David Gregory Hawkins (born October 28, 1982) is an American former professional basketball player. He is a 1.95 m (6 ft 4¾ in) tall shooting guard.

== College career ==
Hawkins played college basketball at Temple University for John Chaney's Owls. He became the team's leader after being reinstated to it from a suspension due to bad grades. He was named to the 2002–03 Atlantic 10 Conference All-Atlantic 10 Conference Second Team and to the 2003–04 Atlantic 10 Conference All-Atlantic 10 Conference First Team, averaging 16.9 and 24.4 points per game respectively.

== Professional career ==
Hawkins was signed to the Houston Rockets for a brief period of time. He was later released from the team and signed with Sebastiani Rieti, then in the Italian second division. He currently plays for Trilogy which is an American men's 3-on-3 basketball team that plays in the BIG3. Trilogy won the inaugural season of the BIG 3 in 2017, completing a perfect season.

=== Virtus Roma ===
He agreed to play for Italian powerhouse Virtus Roma in March 2005. Hawkins finished the season with an average of 17.1 points per game. During the next season, he shined in ULEB's Eurocup, averaging 18.5 points per game, but also showing great versatility and leading the competition in steals with 2.9 per game. Roma reached the quarter-final and Hawkins showed he was ready for Europe's highest stage, the Euroleague.

Spending two more seasons in Roma, Hawkins helped the team regain something of its past glory by qualifying twice to the Euroleague's Top 16. During those two Euroleague seasons, he averaged 13.6 and 10.9 points per game. Nevertheless, at the end of the 2007–08 season, team manager Dejan Bodiroga decided not to renew his contract.

=== Armani Jeans Milano ===
After that, Hawkins signed with another Italian Euroleague team, Armani Jeans Milano, leading it up to the finals, lost against Montepaschi Siena. On February 15, 2009 he scored a career-high 35 points against Montegranaro, also adding 10 rebounds.

=== Montepaschi Siena ===
In 2009, he moved to Montepaschi Siena where he played with former Atlantic 10 rival Romain Sato. In July 2010 he returned to play for Olimpia Milano.

=== Beşiktaş Milangaz ===
On August 19, 2011, Hawkins signed a one-year contract with the Turkish team Beşiktaş Milangaz. On February 18, 2012, Hawkins led the team to their first Turkish Cup win averaging 9.8 points, 3.3 assists and 29.3 minutes. On April 29, 2012, he won the EuroChallenge Cup with Beşiktaş Milangaz scoring 13 points and 4 assists in the final. In June 2012, he won the Turkish League Champions with Beşiktaş Milangaz.

=== Galatasaray Medical Park ===
On August 16, 2012, Hawkins signed a three-year contract with the Turkish team Galatasaray Medical Park. However, Hawkins failed a doping test after the Gaziantep Büyükşehir Belediyespor game in December 2012 and was banned from professional basketball for four years by the Turkish Basketball Federation. The substance detected in his blood was Methylecgonine, a common metabolite of cocaine. After the decision, Hawkins’ contract with Galatasaray was cancelled.

== The Basketball Tournament (TBT) ==
In the summer of 2015, Hawkins competed in The Basketball Tournament for the City of Gods. Alongside former NBA players James Gist, Dermarr Johnson, Pops Mensah-Bonsu and Michael Sweetney, Hawkins helped guide the City of Gods to the 2015 TBT Championship Game where they lost 84–71 to Overseas Elite. In their 2017 first-round matchup against Gael Nation, a team composed of Iona College basketball alum, Hawkins scored 17 points and grabbed 4 rebounds in the City of Gods' 88–86 loss.
