= Andrea Capobianco =

Italian basketball coach (born 1966)

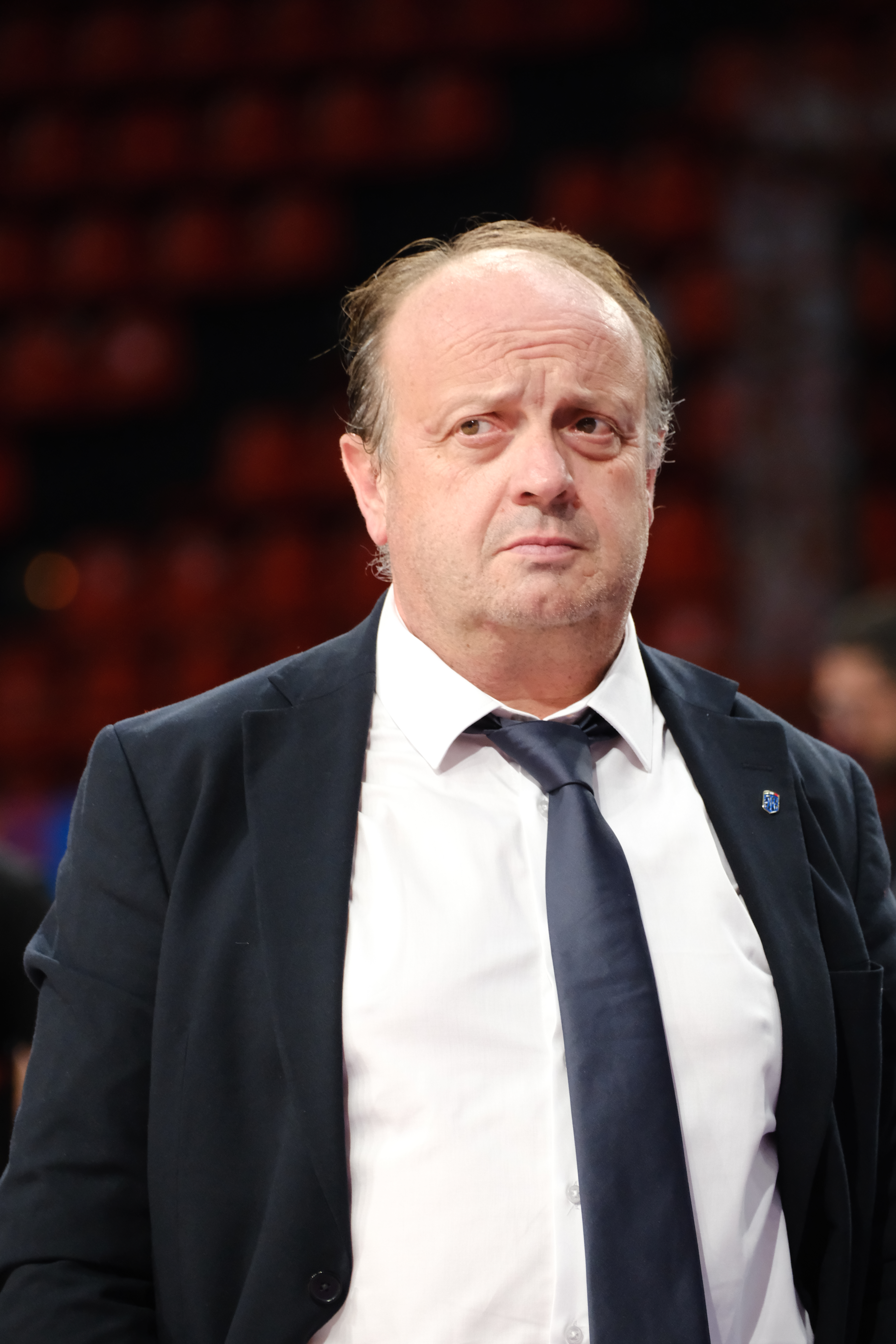
Andrea Capobianco in 2025

Andrea Capobianco (born 9 August 1966) is an Italian basketball coach of the Italian national team, which he coached at the EuroBasket Women 2017.
