= PalaRossini =

Indoor sports arena in Ancona, Italy

Coordinates: 43°33′59″N 13°31′35″E

Banca Marche Palace
- Interactive map of Banca Marche Palace
- Location: Ancona, Italy
- Capacity: 6,500

Construction
- Opened: 2005

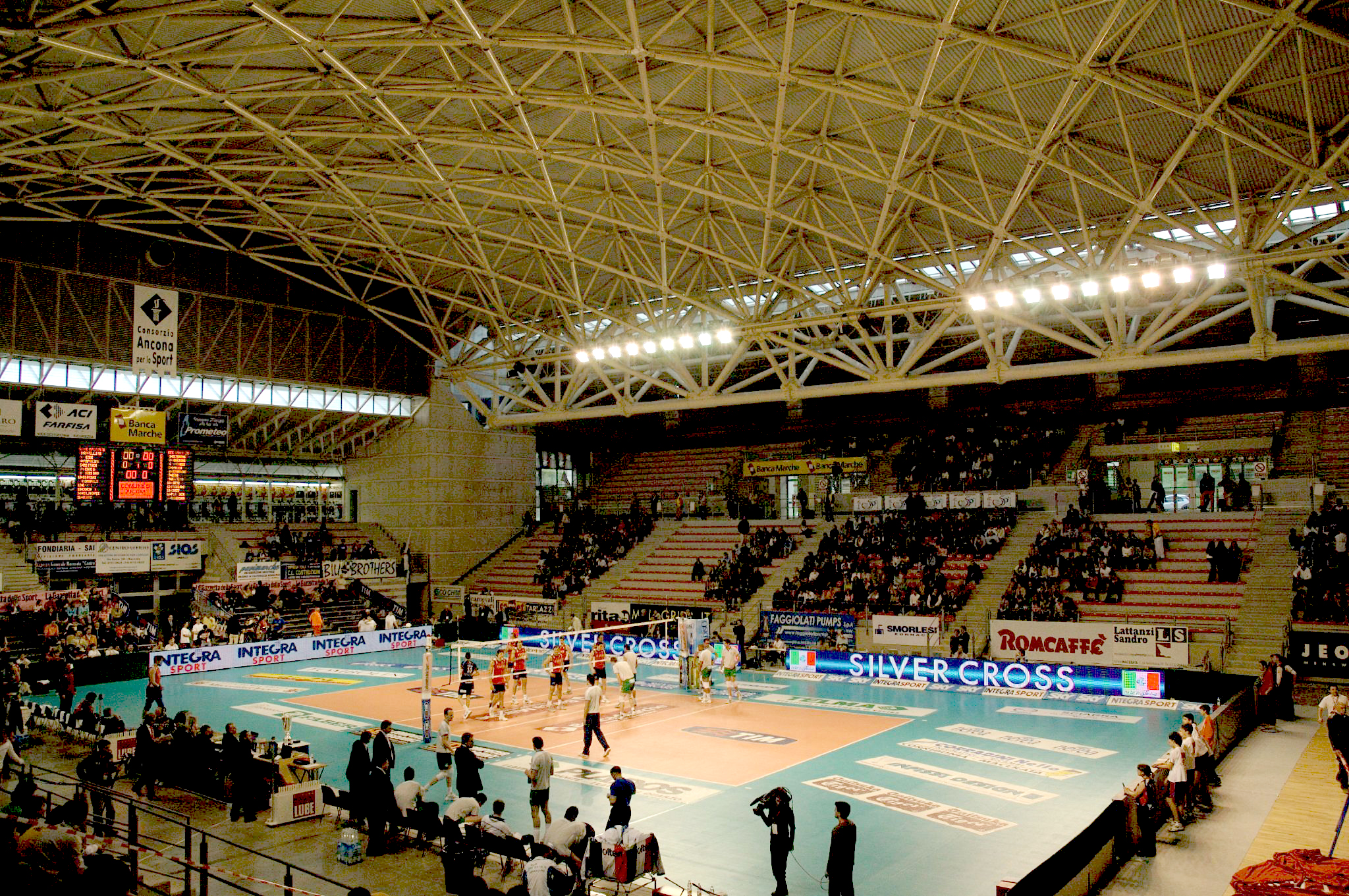
PalaRossini

Banca Marche Palace ( or PalaRossini) is an indoor sports arena, located in Ancona, Italy. The capacity is 6,500 people.

It has hosted some matches of the 2010 FIVB Men's World Championship.
