= Marco Mordente =

Italian basketball player (born 1979)

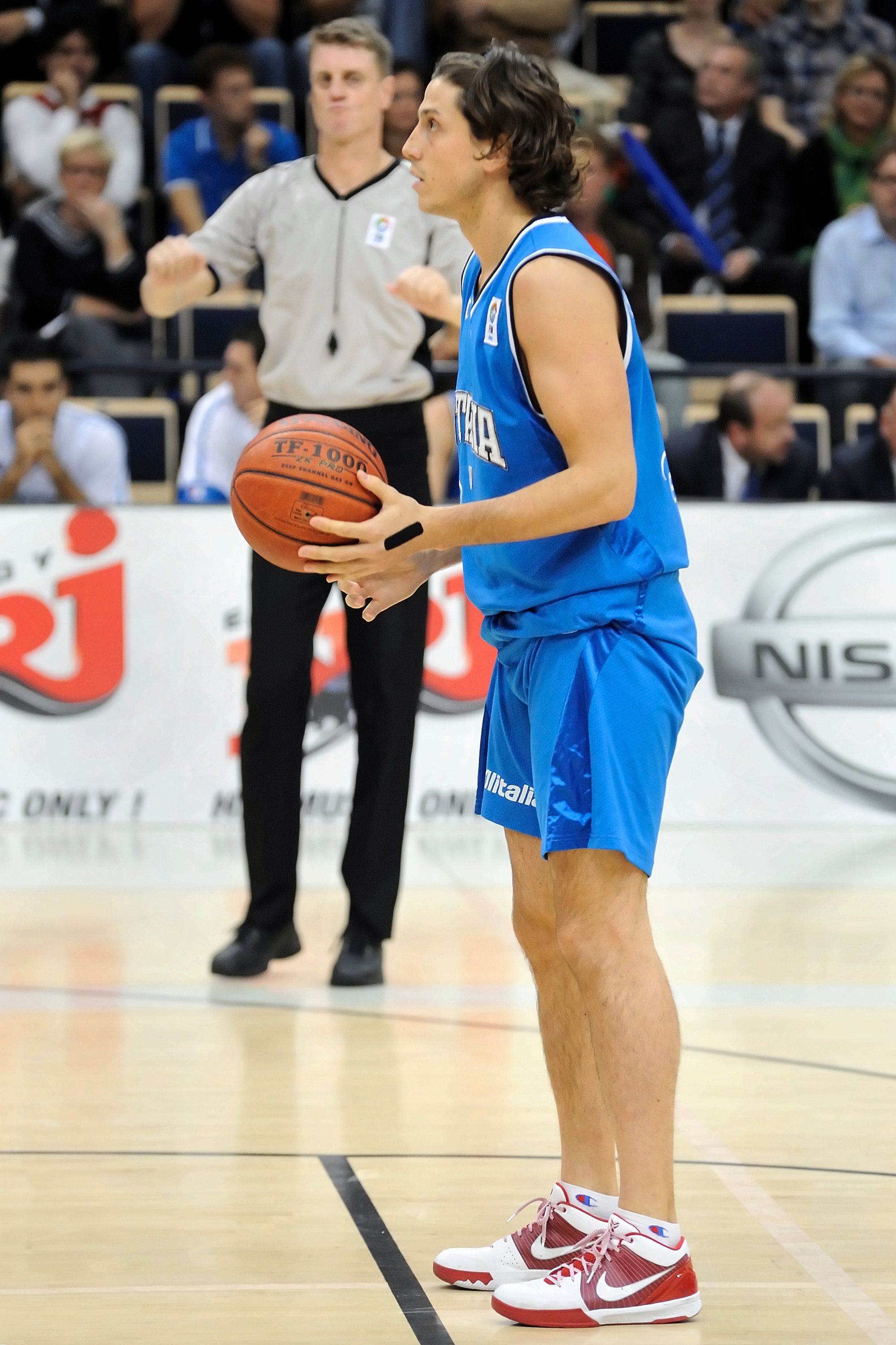

Personal information
- Born: January 7, 1979 (age 47) Teramo, Italy
- Listed height: 1.92 m (6 ft 4 in)
- Listed weight: 88 kg (194 lb)

Career information
- NBA draft: 2001: undrafted
- Playing career: 1996–2016
- Position: Point guard / shooting guard

Career history
- 1996–2002: Olimpia Milano
- 1999–2000: → Virtus Ragusa
- 2000–2001: → Reggiana
- 2002–2005: Reggiana
- 2003: → Mens Sana Siena
- 2005–2008: Benetton Treviso
- 2008–2011: Olimpia Milano
- 2011–2012: Virtus Roma
- 2012–2015: Juvecaserta
- 2015–2016: Viola Reggio Calabria

Career highlights
- Italian League champion (2006); Italian Cup winner (2007); Italian Supercup winner (2006)
Medals
Men's basketball
Representing Italy
Mediterranean Games
Gold medal – first place	2005 Almería	Team competition

Marco Mordente (born January 7, 1979) is an Italian former professional basketball player. He also represented the Italian national basketball team. He played at the point guard position.

== Career ==
In 1998 while he was playing for Olimpia Milano he lost the final match of Saporta Cup against Žalgiris Kaunas; in 2003 his team, Siena, reached the third place in Euroleague. He has won Italian title in 2006 with Benetton and with the same team he won Italian Supercup 2006 and Italian Cup 2007.

== National team career ==
Mordente wore Italian jersey of youth team at European Championship of 1995 and 1998; he was a member of Italian senior roster at European Championship in 2005 and World Championship in 2006.

== Career statistics ==
Legend
GP	Games played	GS	Games started	MPG	Minutes per game
FG%	Field-goal percentage	3P%	3-point field-goal percentage	FT%	Free-throw percentage
RPG	Rebounds per game	APG	Assists per game	SPG	Steals per game
BPG	Blocks per game	PPG	Points per game	PIR	Performance index rating
**Bold**	Career high

=== EuroLeague ===
*	Led the league

Year	Team	GP	GS	MPG	FG%	3P%	FT%	RPG	APG	SPG	BPG	PPG	PIR
2002–03	Mens Sana	1	0	13.0	.333	.000	**1.000**	1.0	1.0	—	—	4.0	3.0
2005–06	Treviso	19	5	24.0	.506	.415	.848	**2.8**	1.6	**1.2**	**.1**	7.1	8.1
2006–07	Treviso	**20**	0	**24.4**	**.519**	.500	.778	**2.8**	1.5	**1.2**	**.1**	**9.9**	**10.2**
2008–09	Milano	12	0	17.6	.491	**.556***	.833	1.3	.6	.5	—	7.6	5.1
2009–10	Milano	10	**6**	23.6	.370	.458	.857	1.6	**2.1**	.3	—	6.3	5.2
2010–11	Milano	10	5	20.7	.353	.286	.750	1.0	1.1	.6	—	4.7	2.0
Career		72	16	22.4	.468	.450	.822	2.1	1.4	.8	.0	7.5	6.9
