= Cucciago =

Cucciago Cusciagh (Lombard)
- Comune
- Comune di Cucciago
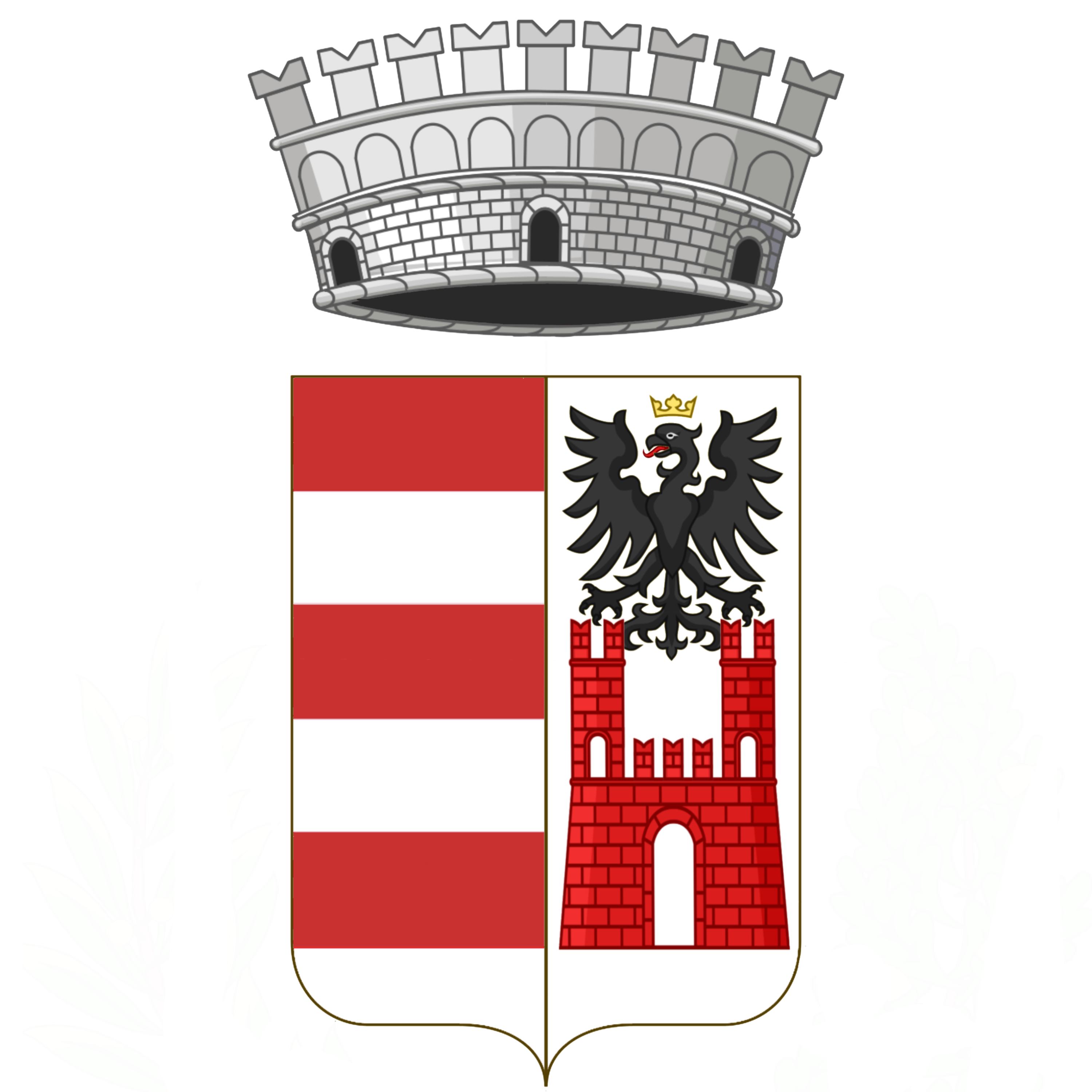
- Coat of arms

- Location within Italy Location within Lombardy
- Coordinates: 45°44′N 9°6′E
- Country: Italy
- Region: Lombardy
- Province: Province of Como (CO)

Area
  - Total: 5.0 km^{2} (1.9 sq mi)

Population (Dec. 2004)
  - Total: 3,205
  - Density: 640/km^{2} (1,700/sq mi)
- Demonym: Cucciaghesi
- Time zone: UTC+1 (CET)
  - Summer (DST): UTC+2 (CEST)
- Postal code: 22060
- Dialing code: 031

Cucciago (Brianzöö: Cusciagh [kyˈʃaːk]) is a comune (municipality) in the Province of Como in the Italian region Lombardy, located about 30 kilometres (19 mi) north of Milan and about 9 kilometres (6 mi) south of Como. As of 31 December 2004, it had a population of 3,205 and an area of 5.0 km^{2} (1.9 sq mi).

Cucciago borders the following municipalities: Cantù, Casnate con Bernate, Fino Mornasco, Senna Comasco, Vertemate con Minoprio.

Cucciago is served by Cucciago railway station.

== Demographic evolution ==
Historical population

Year	Pop.	±%
1861	898	—
1871	908	+1.1%
1881	1,036	+14.1%
1901	1,176	+13.5%
1911	1,355	+15.2%

Year	Pop.	±%
1921	1,331	−1.8%
1931	1,451	+9.0%
1936	1,375	−5.2%
1951	1,485	+8.0%
1961	1,773	+19.4%

Year	Pop.	±%
1971	2,144	+20.9%
1981	2,273	+6.0%
1991	2,785	+22.5%
2001	3,196	+14.8%

Source: Data from ISTAT
