= Sutor Basket Montegranaro =

- Nickname: Rangers
- Leagues: Promozione
- Founded: 1947
- History: Società Sportiva Enzo Bassi (1947–1955); Sutor Basket Montegranaro (1955-current)
- Arena: PalaRossini
- Capacity: 5,066
- Location: Montegranaro, Marche, Italy
- Team colors: Yellow and Blue
- President: Molly Pizzuti
- Head coach: Marco Ciarpella
- Website: sutorbasket.it
Home	Away

Sutor Basket Montegranaro, is an amateur Italian basketball club based in Montegranaro, Marche. It plays in the Promozione (7th division) as of June 2015.

It was formerly in the top division, with the 2013-14 season its last in Lega Basket Serie A before on and off the court issues led to the club leaving the professional world.

== History ==
The basketball club was founded in 1955 by local parish priest Don Gaetano Campanelli from Porto San Giorgio as Società Sportiva Sutor, sutor being a Latin word for shoemaker, the main local source of employment at the time.

Sutor mostly played in the lower divisions in its early years, they were promoted to the second division Legadue in 2001 for the first time in history. Though they were relegated back to Serie B they returned to the Legadue in 2004.

An against the odds promotion to the first division Serie A in 2006 allowed the small town of Montegranaro to become part of the Italian basketball elite.

== Logos ==
Former logo

== Arena ==
Historically, the team has played at the PalaSavelli (capacity: 3,800) in Porto San Giorgio, with a brief intermede in Ancona at the PalaRossini (capacity:5,066).

== Players ==
=== Notable players ===
- (Italy) Valerio Amoroso 3 seasons: '05-'08
- (Italy) Augusto Binelli 1 season: '01-'02
- (Italy) Giuliano Maresca 3 seasons: '04-'07
- (Argentina) Oscar Chiaramello 3 seasons: '04-'06 '08-'09
- (Belgium) Kristof Ongenaet 1 season: '09-'11
- (Brazil) Marquinhos Vieira 1 season: '04-'05
- (Georgia (country)) Shammond Williams 1 season: '10-'11
- (Germany) Eyinmisan Nikagbatse 2 seasons: '05-'07
- (Greece) Kostas Vasileiadis 1 season: '08-'09
- (Puerto Rico) Elias Ayuso 1 season: '01-'02
- (Senegal) Cheikh Ya-Ya Dia 1 season: '01-'02
- (Malta) Tevin Falzon 1 season: '22-23
- (United States) Randolph Childress 3 seasons: '04-'07
- (United States) Sharrod Ford 1 season: '07-'08
- (United States) Kevin Freeman 1 season: '01-'02
- (United States) Kiwane Garris 2 seasons: '07-'09
- (United States) Brandon Hunter 1 season: '08-'09
- (United States) Leroy Hurd 1 season: '05-'06
- (United States) Ricky Minard 2 seasons: '07-'09
- (United States) Ronald Slay 1 season: '06-'07
- (United States) Bryce Taylor 1 season: '08-'09
- (United States) P. J. Tucker 1 season: '11
- (United States) Elton Tyler 1 season: '04-'05

== Sponsorship names ==
Throughout its history, due to sponsorship, the club has been known as:

- Premiata Montegranaro (1998-09)
- Sigma Coatings Montegranaro (2009–10)
- Fabi Shoes Montegranaro (2010–12)
