= Mens Sana Basketball Siena =

Italian basketball club

Mens Sana
- League: Serie B Basket
- Founded: 1934
- History: Mens Sana Basket (1934–2000); MontePaschi Mens Sana Basket Siena (2000–2014); Mens Sana Basket 1871 (2015–2019); Mens Sana Basketball Academy (2019–2023); Mens Sana Basketball Siena (2023–present)
- Arena: Palasport Mens Sana
- Capacity: 6,000
- Location: Siena, Italy
- Team colors: Green, white and black
- President: Francesco Frati
- Head coach: Paolo Betti
- Championships: 6 Italian Leagues; 3 Italian Cups; 6 Italian Supercups; 1 FIBA Saporta Cup
- Retired numbers: 3 (5, 9, 20)
- Website: menssanabasket.it

Mens Sana Basketball Siena, also known simply as Mens Sana, is an Italian professional basketball club based in Siena. It is a section of the sports club Polisportiva Mens Sana, founded in 1871. Under the name Montepaschi Siena, derived from sponsor Banca Monte dei Paschi di Siena, the club was a dominant presence in the Italian Serie A, winning five titles in a row from 2006–07 to 2010–11, besides two more titles later revoked by the Italian Federation, whilst also challenging for titles in Europe. After financial problems caused the club to go bankrupt in 2014, it moved down to the fourth division. In the 2015–16 season it played in the second division.

== History ==
=== Early history (1871–1967) ===
The parent organisation, Associazione Ginnastica Senese "Mens Sana in Corpore Sano 1871", was formed on 16 April 1871 by university students. In the beginning of the 19th century the gymnastics club became a multi-sports club (Italian: Polisportiva) by adding other sports under its wing. Basketball was first practiced by the club in May 1907 at the Venice Gymnastics competition when teacher Ida Nomi Pesciolini led a women's team in a basketball demonstration. It is claimed this was the first time the game (invented in 1891) was played in Italy, with Nomi discovering the sport whilst in the United Kingdom and then translating the rules in Italian. The official basketball section of the club was established in 1934; however, the club and the organisation as a whole had limited activities until the end of the Second World War in 1945. After that date, basketball was played again, at first by students from the Piccolomini high school.

=== Professional club (1967–2000) ===
On 5 March 1967, Mens Sana played against city rival Costone for a place in the second division Serie B, with the former winning 64–63. In 1973, having lost the previous year, Siena beat Brina Rieti 80–66 to reach the top tier Serie A for the first time. During the 1974–75 season, Sapori Siena finished fifth in the league thanks to a slow-paced style combined with zone defense as twin towers Carl Johnson and Enrico Bovone dominated the paint.

In 1978–79, Antonini Siena reached the Serie A quarterfinals, earning a place in the 1979–80 FIBA Korać Cup where they went to the Round of 16. Only two seasons later the side was in the second division again and at the end of the 1986 season it moved down to the third division Serie B Eccellenza. Siena would stay there until 1990, returning to the Serie A in 1991 and staying there for good from 1994. At the beginning of the decade, the club had become autonomous from the Polisportiva. With coaches like Gianfranco Lombardi, Cesare Pancotto and Valerio Bianchini and players Sandro Dell'Agnello, Sylvester Gray, Gerard King, and Larry Middleton the club had solid results, including two Serie A quarterfinals in 1997–98 and 1999–00 and two participations in the FIBA Korać Cup.

=== Montepaschi Siena (2000–2014) ===
Club logo during the Montepaschi era

In the summer of 2000, Banca Monte dei Paschi di Siena, a banking company based in the city, became the majority sponsor of the side. The club, now known as Montepaschi Siena, took a new dimension, first signing Italian international Roberto Chiacig and playing in the 2000–01 FIBA SuproLeague. A year later coach Ergin Ataman and players Vrbica Stefanov, Mindaugas Žukauskas, Boris Gorenc and Milenko Topić were added. The team, with the mid-season addition of Petar Naumoski, beat Pamesa Valencia to lift the 2002 Saporta Cup, their first ever title. In 2002–03, Montepaschi added guard Alphonso Ford and forward Mirsad Türkcan. For their first season in the EuroLeague, Europe's best competition, the Italians reached the Final Four (just the second team to achieve the feat), losing 62–65 to Benetton Treviso, a team that also beat them in the domestic semifinals on the way to the title.

Before the 2003–04 season, Carlo Recalcati, the Italian national team coach, was chosen in order to win a scudetto (Italian title), with Ford and Turkcan being replaced by David Andersen, Giacomo Galanda, Bootsy Thornton, David Vanterpool and later Michalis Kakiouzis. Siena would accomplish that goal, sweeping all of its playoff series 3–0 and claiming their first ever scudetto after toppling Metis Varese, Scavolini Pesaro and Skipper Bologna. Earlier, the same Bologna side had impeded their second Euroleague Final Four run, beating Montepaschi 103–102 in overtime.

The next two seasons put a brake on that success, with the sole addition of the Italian Supercup amidst two quarterfinal eliminations in the league and one Top 16 appearance in the Euroleague. Siena native and long serving club member Simone Pianigiani was promoted to the head coach role in 2006 whilst the roster was overhauled. Montepaschi went to the quarterfinals of the 2006–07 ULEB Cup (Europe's second-tier competition) before losing to UNICS. More importantly, a team led by Rimantas Kaukėnas, Joseph Forte and Terrell McIntyre won 39 of the 44 games they played in the Serie A season (with a 3–0 finals sweep) to earn their second league title.

With the return of Thornton and the addition of Kšyštof Lavrinovič, Montepaschi reached the 2008 Euroleague Final Four after sweeping their quarterfinals. A 17-point second-half lead against Maccabi Tel Aviv proved insufficient as the Italians lost in the semifinal. On the domestic front, Siena started the season with 18 successive wins and were never challenged in their third title conquest. In 2008–09, Siena became the second side to complete a domestic treble after losing just one game on their way to the league, Cup and Supercup titles.

After adding Nikos Zisis, Marko Jarić, Malik Hairston and Bo McCalebb, Montepaschi reached another Euroleague Final Four in 2011, overcoming then-top scorer McCalebb's injury and a record 48-point loss to Olympiacos in the quarterfinals game 1; however, they were again stopped in the semifinals, this time by champions Panathinaikos. In the league they proved unstoppable again, adding a fifth straight Serie A crown and a third straight Cup title to their trophy cabinet. In 2011–12, Montepaschi achieved an unprecedented sixth consecutive Serie A title, adding the Supercup (their fifth in a row) and Cup (fourth) for good measure. The 2011–12 Euroleague saw eventual champions Olympiacos avenge their preceding year's defeat by topping the Italians in the quarterfinals.

All the titles won during this season were to be revoked four years later by the Italian Basketball Federation, following an investigation for accounting and fiscal fraud. 2012–13 saw two major changes with a decrease in budget that saw several players leave and a change in coach, with Pianigiani replaced by assistant Luca Banchi. Montepaschi wasn't as competitive, being eliminated at the Euroleague Top 16 stage whilst in the domestic league they finished the regular season in fifth place with 12 losses; however, the holders rallied in the playoffs, winning two Best-of–7 series in game 7, against EA7 Emporio Armani Milano and Cimberio Varese before toppling Acea Roma 4–1 in the finals to add title number seven to the Cup they had earlier won. This title too was revoked three years later by the Italian Basketball Federation. The next season (2013–2014) saw an ever-contracting budget and a more ordinary roster, Montepaschi found it harder to compete in the 2013–14 Euroleague, alternating between close wins (sometimes on the buzzer) and closer defeats, ending the season with 3 wins and 7 losses. In their final game against Unicaja that would decide who progressed from the group, the Italians were the victims of a buzzer beating shot that eliminated them from the competition. Though its financial problems emerged to the fore, with a relegation all but assured due to massive debts, on the court the holders kept fighting, pushing favourites Milan to seven games in the Serie A finals, though they would go on to concede the title.

Soon after, Mens Sana Basket was declared bankrupt amidst debts of 5,4 million euros and the departure of sponsor Montepaschi even if the company had revenue for over 400 million Euro. Furthermore, an inquest had been started in 2012 after suspected undeclared payments and tax evasion by club officials for over 90 million Euro, including former president Ferdinando Minucci. On 25 October 2017, following an investigation for accounting and fiscal fraud, including the destruction of some of the company's accounts by the president Ferdinando Minucci, the Italian Basketball Federation revoked all the domestic titles won by the club during the 2011–12 and 2012–13 seasons, namely two Italian titles, two Italian Cups and an Italian Supercup.

=== New start (2014–present) ===
The Mens Sana multi-sports club then retook ownership of the basketball club, it was registered in the fourth division Serie B for the 2014–15 season, with all players having left though Roberto Chiacig returned. In June 2015, Mens Sana 1871 won the third place game in the Serie B final four to earn a promotion to the unified second division Serie A2 for 2015–16. In March 2019, Siena was excluded from the West Group of the Serie A2 for economic issues. In the beginnings of 2019, the team's roster was practically dismantled due to the club's financial troubles making it impossible to pay the league's taxes and the wages. The exclusion was determined after various renounciatiouns by the team to play certain games and on the charges of "unsportsmanlike conduct", since its line-up altered the competitiveness of the league.

Following the exclusion, the team was renamed as Mens Sana Siena Basketball Academy, after absorbing again the control of Mens Sana's former satellite youth team; and enrolled for the 2019–20 Promozione Toscana, in the 7th tier of the Italian Basketball Federation. Such league was suspended due to the COVID-19 pandemic in Italy with Siena in the lead. On 21 August 2020, it was announced that Mens Sana Siena would be participating on the Group A of the Serie C silver, a regional league representing the 5th Tier of the Italian Basketball Federation.

== Arena ==
Mens Sana played in the Sant’Agata gymnasium before moving into the Dodecaedro (later Palazzetto Giannelli) when it was built in 1968. They later moved into the Palascalavo in 1976 (now Palasport Mens Sana, capacity 6,000).

== Honours ==
=== Domestic competitions ===
- Italian League

Winners (6): 2003–04, 2006–07, 2007–08, 2008–09, 2009–10, 2010–11, ~~2011–12~~, ~~2012–13~~
Runners-up (1): 2013–14

- Italian Cup

Winners (3): 2009, 2010, 2011, ~~2012~~, ~~2013~~
Runners-up (2): 2002, 2014

- Italian Supercup

Winners (6): 2004, 2007, 2008, 2009, 2010, 2011, ~~2013~~
Runners-up (1): 2012

=== European competitions ===
- EuroLeague

3rd place (3): 2002–03, 2007–08, 2010–11
4th place (1): 2003–04
Final Four (4): 2003, 2004, 2008, 2011

- FIBA Saporta Cup

Winners (1): 2001–02

=== Other competitions ===
- Bormio, Italy Invitational Game

Winners (3): 2007, 2008, 2011

- Florence, Italy Invitational Game

Winners (2): 2008, 2009

- Torneo Gdynia

Winners (1): 2010

- Vacallo, Switzerland Invitational Game

Winners (1): 2010

- Torneo Città di Cagliari

Winners (1): 2011

- Trofeo Vasco Martini

Winners (1): 2011

== Season by season ==
Season	Tier	League	Pos.	Italian Cup	European competitions	
2006–07	1	Serie A	1st	Semifinalist	2 ULEB Cup	QF
2007–08	1	Serie A	1st	Quarterfinalist	1 Euroleague	3rd
2008–09	1	Serie A	1st	Champion	1 Euroleague	QF
2009–10	1	Serie A	1st	Champion	1 Euroleague	T16
2010–11	1	Serie A	1st	Champion	1 Euroleague	3rd
2011–12	1	Serie A	1st (Note: Title revoked later.)	revoked	1 Euroleague	QF
2012–13	1	Serie A	1st	revoked	1 Euroleague	T16
2013–14	1	Serie A	2nd	Runner–up	1 Euroleague	RS
2013–14	1	Serie A	2nd	Runner–up	2 Eurocup	L32
2014–15	3	Serie B	1st			
2015–16	2	Serie A2	5th			
2016–17	2	Serie A2	11th			
2017–18	2	Serie A2	11th			
2018–19	2	Serie A2	Sacked			
2019–20	6	Promozione Toscana	1st			
2020–21	5	Serie C Silver (Toscana)	2nd (Group A)			
2020–21	5	Serie C Silver (Toscana)	5th (Qualification Group)			
2021–22	5	Serie C Silver (Toscana)				
2022–23	5	Serie C Gold(Toscana)				

Source: Eurobasket.com

== Notable players ==
=== Retired numbers ===
Mens Sana 1871 Basket retired numbers
N°	Nat.	Player	Position	Tenure
5	(United States)	Terrell McIntyre	PG	2006–2010
9	(Italy)	Alberto Ceccherini	SG	1974-1981, 1982-1984
20	(United States) / (Italy)	Shaun Stonerook	PF	2005–2012

=== Other notable players ===
Note: Flags indicate national team eligibility at FIBA-sanctioned events. Players may hold other non-FIBA nationalities not displayed.

Criteria

To appear in this section a player must have either:

- Set a club record or won an individual award while at the club
- Played at least one official international match for their national team at any time
- Played at least one official NBA match at any time.

2020s

- (Finland) Okko Järvi

2010s

- (Estonia) Kristjan Kangur: 2 seasons: '11–'13
- (Lithuania) Jonas Mačiulis: 0.5 season: '12
- (Serbia) Igor Rakočević: 1 season: '11–'12
- (North Macedonia) Bo McCalebb: 2 seasons: '10–'12
- (Italy) Pietro Aradori: 2 seasons: '10–'12
- (Serbia) Milovan Raković: 1 season: '10–'11
- (United States) Dionte Christmas: 0.5 season: '13
- (United States) Erick Green: 1 season: '13–'14
- (United States) (Montenegro) Taylor Rochestie: 1 season: '13–'14
- (Angola) Carlos Morais 1 season: '18-'19

2000s

- (Greece) Nikos Zisis: 3 seasons: '09–'12
- (United States) David Hawkins: 1 season: '09–'10
- (Bosnia and Herzegovina) Henry Domercant: 2 seasons: '08–'10
- (Lithuania) Kšyštof Lavrinovič: 5 seasons: '07–'12
- (Central African Republic) Romain Sato: 4 seasons: '06–'10
- (United States) Lonny Baxter: 1 season: '06–'07
- (United States) Joseph Forte: 1 season: '06–'07
- (Georgia (country)) Vladimir Boisa: 2 seasons: '05–'07
- (United States) Jamel Thomas: 1 season: '05–'06
- (Nigeria) Benjamin Eze: 7 seasons: '04–'10, '12-'13
- (Italy) Carlton Myers: 1 season: '04–'05
- (Greece) Efthimios Rentzias: 1 season: '04–'05
- (United States) Bootsy Thornton: 4 seasons: '03–'05, '07–'08, '11–'12
- (Italy) Luigi Datome: 4 seasons: '03–'07
- (Australia) David Andersen: 2 seasons: '03–'04, '11-'12
- (United States) David Vanterpool: 2 seasons: '03–'05
- (Greece) Michalis Kakiouzis: 3 seasons: '02–'05
- (Serbia and Montenegro) Dušan Vukčević: 2 seasons: '02–'04
- (Turkey) Mirsad Türkcan: 1 season: '02–'03
- (United States) Alphonso Ford: 1 season: '02–'03
- (North Macedonia) Vrbica Stefanov: 5 seasons: '01–'05, '06–'07
- (Lithuania) Mindaugas Žukauskas: 5 seasons: '01–'06
- (Serbia and Montenegro) Nikola Bulatović: 1 season: '01–'02
- (Lithuania) Tomas Masiulis: 1 season: '01–'02
- (North Macedonia) Petar Naumoski: 1 season: '01–'02
- (Italy) Roberto Chiacig: 7 seasons: '00–'06, '14-'15, '20
- (Italy) Germán Scarone: 3 seasons: '00–'03
- (Slovenia) Boris Gorenc: 2 seasons: '00–'02
- (United States) Brian Evans: 1 season: '00–'01

1990s

- (United States) Sylvester Gray: 2 seasons: '99–'01
- (United States) Travis Mays: 2 seasons: '99–'01
- (United States) Ashraf Amaya: 1 season: '98–'99
- (United States) Jimmy Oliver: 1 season: '98–'99
- (United States) Chris Corchiani: 1 season: '98–'99
- (United States) Jerry Reynolds: 1 season: '97–'98
- (Italy) Sandro Dell'Agnello: 4 seasons: '96–'00
- (United States) Gerard King: 2 seasons: '96–'98
- (Bulgaria) (Italy) Georgi Glouchkov: 1 season: '96–97
- (United States) Lucius Davis: 1 season: '96–'97
- (United States) Sherron Mills: 1 season: '95–'96
- (United States) John Turner: 3 seasons: '94–'96, '99–'00
- (United States) Dallas Comegys: 1 season: '94–'95
- (United States) Bob Thornton: 1 season: '93–'94
- (United States) Darren Daye: 2 seasons: '92–'94
- (United States) Frank Kornet: 1 season: '91–'92
- (United States) Lemone Lampley: 3 seasons: '90–'93
- (United States) Wendell Alexis: 1 season: '90–'91

== Head coaches ==
- (Turkey) Ergin Ataman: 2 seasons: '01–'03
- (Italy) Carlo Recalcati: 3 seasons: '03–'06
- (Italy) Simone Pianigiani: 6 seasons: '06–'12
- (Italy) Luca Banchi: 1 season: '12–'13
- (Italy) Marco Crespi: 1 season: '13–'14

== Sponsorship names ==
Throughout the years, due to sponsorship, the club has been known under many different names.

- Sapori Siena (1973–1978)
- Antonini Siena (1978–1981)
- Sapori Siena (1981–1983)
- Mister Day Siena (1983–1986)
- Conad Siena (1987–1989)
- Ticino Siena (1989–1993)
- Olitalia Siena (1993–1994)
- Comerson Siena (1994–1995)
- Cx Orologi Siena (1995–1996)
- Fontanafredda Siena (1996–1998)
- Ducato Siena (1998–2000)
- Montepaschi Siena (2000–2014)
- Gecom Mens Sana Siena (2014–2019)
- Note di Siena (2023–)

== See also ==
- Mens Sana 1871 Basket in European and worldwide competitions
