= Palasport Biella =

Indoor sporting arena in Biella, Italy

Palasport Biella, also known as PalaBonprix for sponsorship reasons, is an indoor sporting arena located in Biella, Italy. The capacity of the arena is 3,508 people and it opened in 1993. It was the home of the Pallacanestro Biella professional basketball team.

Until its construction, Biella’s teams (Libertas until 1970, and later the Biella Basket Club) played their home games at the Rivetti gymnasium. Due to the limited capacity of the previous venue and the opportunity to use funds allocated for the Italia '90 FIFA World Cup, construction of the new indoor arena began in 1991.

The first basketball game was played there on 16 October 1993 between the Biella Basket Club (sponsored by Uclit) and Cover Saluzzo, a match valid for the Serie D championship. The following season was the first for the newly founded Pallacanestro Biella, which played at the PalaPajetta from its very first year. Initially, the court surface was synthetic; further improvements, including the installation of a wooden parquet floor, were introduced in subsequent years, when a curva section behind one of the baskets was also created (until then there had only been side stands). Following the promotion of Biella basketball to the top division, the official capacity was increased to 2,778 seats, before returning to 2,000 in 2009.

In October 2013, a three-year sponsorship agreement was announced, leading to the arena being renamed PalaBonprix. Between February and March 2021, the venue hosted four editions of the Biella Challenger tennis tournament, part of the ATP Challenger Tour.
