= Palasport Pianella =

Coordinates: 45.740134°N 9.100153°E

Palasport Pianella is an indoor sporting arena that is located in Cucciago, Como, Italy. It has a capacity of 3,910 seats.

== History ==
The arena was built in 1974. In the past, the capacity reached 5,500, but it was reduced due to a restructuring of the arena. It is the home arena of the Pallacanestro Cantù professional basketball team for national domestic Italian League games. The arena also contains a bar, which is open during the games, and an outlet managed by the Eagles, the ultras fan group of the team.

On July 6, 2016, there was the official presentation of the project for the new arena in Cucciago, Cantù. The project consists of a renovation and an extension of the Palasport Pianella, with the increase of capacity from 3,910 to 5,634. Inside the building there will be a new museum of the club, a cafe/restaurant, a gym, a children fun area, a new Pallacanestro Cantù's training court and the offices of the Club. It will be the fourth largest basketball arena in Lega Basket Serie A. Constructions works will last between 11 and 13 months.

Preceded by Palacio de los Deportes; Mexico City	FIBA Intercontinental Cup; Final Venue; 1975	Succeeded by Luna Park; Buenos Aires
