= Romain Sato =

Basketball player

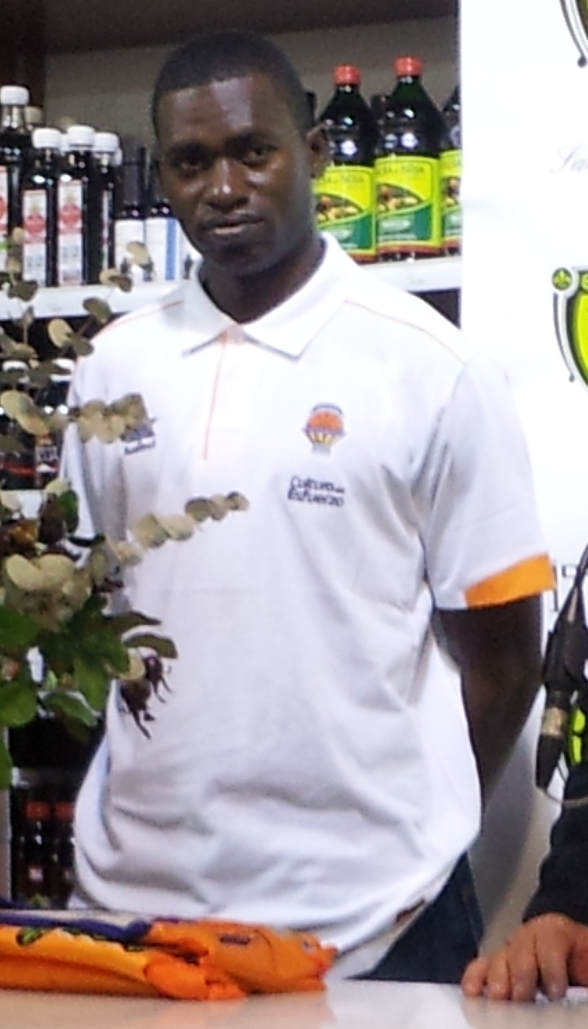
- Sato in 2013

Personal information
- Born: March 2, 1981 (age 45) Bimbo, Central African Republic
- Listed height: 6 ft 5 in (1.96 m)
- Listed weight: 220 lb (100 kg)

Career information
- High school: Dayton Christian (Dayton, Ohio)
- College: Xavier (2000–2004)
- NBA draft: 2004: 2nd round, 52nd overall pick
- Drafted by: San Antonio Spurs
- Playing career: 2004–2021
- Position: Shooting guard / small forward
- Number: 10

Career history
- 2004–2006: Aurora Jesi
- 2006: Barcelona
- 2006–2010: Mens Sana Siena
- 2010–2012: Panathinaikos
- 2012–2013: Fenerbahçe
- 2013–2017: Valencia

Career highlights
- EuroLeague champion (2011); EuroCup champion (2014); Liga ACB champion (2017); Spanish Supercup winner (2017); All-Liga ACB First Team (2014); 4× Lega Serie A champion (2007–2010); 2× Italian Cup winner (2009, 2010); 3× Italian Supercup winner (2007–2009); Lega Serie A MVP (2010); Italian Supercup MVP (2009); Turkish Cup winner (2013); 2× First-team All-Atlantic 10 (2003, 2004)
- Stats at Basketball Reference
- FIBA Hall of Fame

Romain Guessagba-Sato-Lebel (French pronunciation: [ʁɔmɛ̃ ɡesaɡba sato ləbɛl]; born March 2, 1981), generally known as Romain Sato, is a Central African former professional basketball player. Standing at a height of 1.96 m (6 ft 5 in), he played as a swingman.

Sato won four LBA championships with Mens Sana Siena in Italy, and was named the league's MVP in 2010. Sato won the EuroLeague title with Panathinaikos in 2011. In his four years with Valencia of the Liga ACB, he was named to the All-ACB First Team in 2014. Sato was enshrined in the FIBA Hall of Fame in 2024.

He represented the Central African Republic national team in international play, leading them at AfroBasket 2009.

== High school ==
Sato attended Dayton Christian High School, while living in Moraine, Ohio, in the United States. While there, he played basketball, and in 2000 Sato was selected as Mr. Basketball for the state of Ohio. In 2019 he was elected to the Dayton Christian High School Athletic Hall of Fame, and in 2021 the school retired his #23 jersey.

== College career ==
Sato graduated from Xavier University in 2004, having majored in French, after playing college basketball with the Xavier Musketeers. During his time at Xavier, he helped lead the Musketeers to 4 consecutive NCAA tournaments from 2000 to 2004, including Xavier's first Elite Eight appearance in March 2004 (where they lost to Duke), and two Round of 32 appearances.

== Professional career ==
Sato was selected by the San Antonio Spurs in the 2004 NBA draft, and was subsequently waived on February 24, 2005. After being drafted by the Spurs, Sato played in the Italian Second Division with Sicc Cucine Jesi. He was the league's second-leading scorer in the 2005–06 season, averaging 25.5 points per game, and also adding 7.5 rebounds per game.

In Romain's three playoff games that season, he averaged 35 points and 14.6 rebounds. From there, he went to FC Barcelona to play in the 2006 Spanish ACB League playoffs. Sato then returned to Italy to play in the top Italian League with Montepaschi Siena for the 2006–07 season. In his first season with Siena, he helped Montepaschi to win the Scudetto (Italian Championship), and he then went on to win three more Scudetti with Siena. He was named the Italian League MVP in 2010.

In July 2010, he signed a three-year contract with Panathinaikos. In the summer of 2012, he signed a two-year contract with Fenerbahçe Ülker. He left them after one season. In August 2012, he signed a one-year deal with the Spanish team Valencia Basket. On July 1, 2014, he re-signed with Valencia Basket for two more years.

== National team career ==
Sato played with the senior men's Central African Republic national basketball team at the 2009 FIBA Africa Championship. He averaged 21.6 points and 8.6 rebounds per game at the tournament, and was named to the All-Tournament First Team.

== Career statistics ==
Legend
GP	Games played	GS	Games started	MPG	Minutes per game
FG%	Field-goal percentage	3P%	3-point field-goal percentage	FT%	Free-throw percentage
RPG	Rebounds per game	APG	Assists per game	SPG	Steals per game
BPG	Blocks per game	PPG	Points per game	PIR	Performance index rating
**Bold**	Career high

=== EuroLeague ===
†	Denotes season in which Sato won the EuroLeague
*	Led the league

Year	Team	GP	GS	MPG	FG%	3P%	FT%	RPG	APG	SPG	BPG	PPG	PIR
2007–08	Mens Sana	**23**	22	**28.0**	.442	.347	.731	4.9	1.0	**1.8**	.1	11.6	12.7
2008–09	Mens Sana	20	19	25.8	.462	**.400**	.814	3.9	.7	**1.8**	.1	10.1	10.8
2009–10	Mens Sana	16	16	**28.0**	**.490**	.396	**.855**	**5.3**	**1.3**	1.5	—	**13.6**	**16.3**
2010–11†	Panathinaikos	21	16	26.2	.413	.388	.813	3.9	1.1	.7	.1	9.0	10.1
2011–12	Panathinaikos	**23***	20	26.0	.410	.347	.712	4.7	1.0	.7	.4	7.1	8.6
2012–13	Fenerbahçe	**23**	**23**	27.0	.408	.341	.810	4.2	**1.3**	.7	.1	7.3	8.2
2014–15	Valencia	9	6	27.2	.362	.292	.800	4.8	1.1	.9	**.6**	6.3	6.7
Career		135	122	26.8	.433	.363	.789	4.5	1.1	1.1	.2	9.4	10.6

== Gallery ==
Romain Sato's words in his presentation as a Valencia Basket player, in 2013.

Sato answers the questions of the Press in the very same act.

Hommage in Valencia's court after his first season in the club, when he was chosen as best SF in the league, and awarded by local fans as the team's player who showed more effort.
