= Nuova AMG Sebastiani Basket Rieti =

Nuova A.M.G. Sebastiani Basket Rieti
- Nickname: Seba
- Founded: 1998
- Dissolved: 2010
- History: Virtus Rieti; 1998-2003; Nuova AMG Sebastiani Basket Rieti; 2003-2010
- Arena: PalaSojourner ǀ capacity = 2,550
- Location: Rieti, Lazio, Italy (1998-2009); Naples, Campania, Italy (2009-2010)
- Team colors: White and Sky-Blue
- President: Gaetano Papalia
Home	Away

Nuova AMG Sebastiani Basket Rieti, sometimes designed as NSB, was an Italian professional basketball based in Rieti, Lazio though it played one season (the 2009–10 season, its last) in Naples, Campania.

For past club sponsorship names, see sponsorship names.

== History ==
The club was considered the successor of AMG Sebastiani Basket (named after Angelo, Mario and Gino Sebastiani, three sportsmen brothers from Rieti, executed by German soldiers in 1944). It had played in the first division Serie A from 1973 to 1983 and the second division Serie A2 from 1983 to 1988, winning the FIBA Korać Cup in 1980 before disappearing in 1997.

In 1998 the side brought the sporting rights of Sant'Antimo to take part in the Serie B2 as Virtus Rieti. Gaetano Papalia became the owner in 2003 and changed its name to Nuova AMG Sebastiani Basket Rieti. The 2006–07 season saw the club win the second division LegaDue to return Rieti to the first division after twenty-four years.

Rieti finished outside the relegation places for two years but was each year only just admitted to the league due to doubts about its economic situation. That was again the case prior to the 2009–10 season, with the side rejected on 1 July 2009, before being readmitted more than two weeks later. At the same occasion it was announced the club would move to Naples to play, though the team retained its name and its legal base in Rieti with the Italian Federation allowing the side to stay one year in Naples, with Papalia then planning on a full transfer.

The move was undertaken to give the side financial backing that Rieti could not offer, in particular sponsorship, with the club taking the name of sponsor Martos Napoli. In effect in proved the opposite as the club struggled to attract fans and saw its financial problems magnified.

With player salaries unpaid, the team had to play games with players from the youth section, a situation that saw games finish in large defeats including a 138–37 loss to Virtus Roma in January 2010 that saw Napoli establish an unwanted new record for the biggest points differential ever.

The travesty was ended in April 2010, with the club ejected from the league after failing to pay a sum to the Federation (who were waiting for the occasion). All of team's games were cancelled, including those already played. The club was disaffiliated by the Federation in June 2010 and ceased activities soon after.

== Notable players ==
- (United States) David Hawkins 1 season: '04-'05
- (United States) DeMarco Johnson 1 season: '04-'05
- (United States) Jimmie Lee Hunter 1 season: '04-'05
- (United States) Thomas Mobley 1 season: '05-'06
- (United States) Marcus Melvin 2 seasons: '05-'07
- (United States) Joe Troy Smith 1 season: '06-'07
- (Finland) Kimmo Muurinen

== Sponsorship names ==
Throughout the years, due to sponsorship, the club had been known as:

- Tris Rieti (2004–05)
- Noi Sport Monte Terminillo Rieti (2005–06)
- Solsonica Rieti (2006–09)
- Martos Napoli (2009–10)
