= PalaSavelli =

Building in Porto San Giorgio, Italy

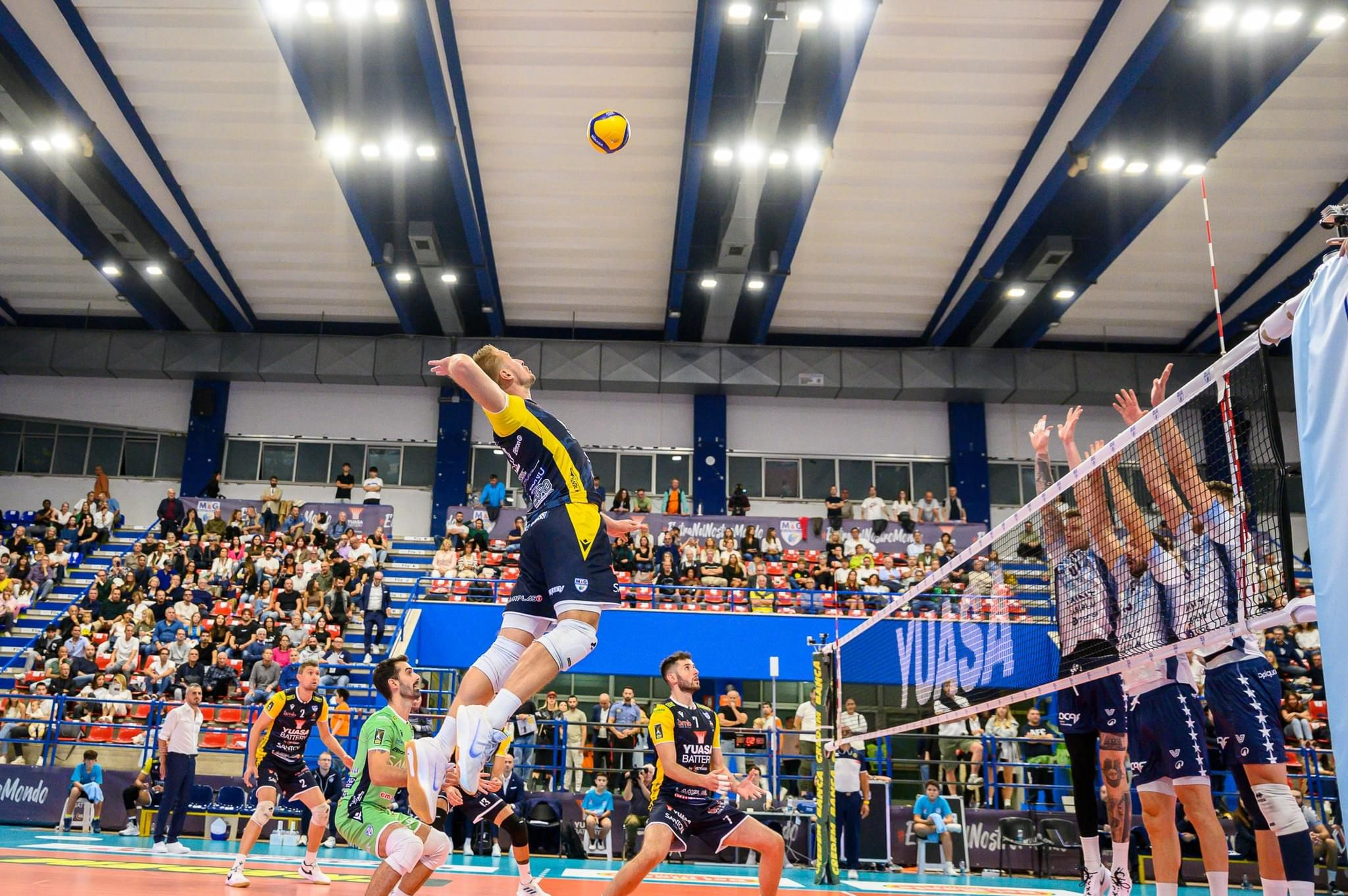
- Interactive map of PalaSavelli
- Location: Via Santa Vittoria 5 Porto San Giorgio (FM), Italy
- Coordinates: 43°9′56.85″N 13°47′49.3″E
- Capacity: 3609
- Surface: Parquet

Tenant
- M&G Volleyball (2024–present)

PalaSavelli is an indoor sporting arena located in Porto San Giorgio, Italy. The capacity of the arena is 3,609 people. It is currently home of the Yuasa Battery Grottazzolina volleyball team.
