= Italy team for EuroBasket 2022 qualification =

Italy
2020-21 season
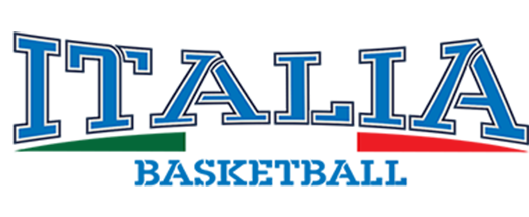
- President: Gianni Petrucci
- Head coach: Romeo Sacchetti
- Qualifiers: Qualified
- PIR leader: Spissu 17.2
- Scoring leader: Vitali 14.8
- Rebounding leader: Fontecchio 5.0
- Assists leader: Spissu 7.7
- Highest home attendance: 4000 vs Russia (20 February 2020)
- Lowest home attendance: 4000 vs Russia (20 February 2020)
- Average home attendance: 4000 vs Russia (20 February 2020)
- Biggest win: 83–64 vs Russia (20 February 2020)
- Biggest defeat: 87–78 @ N. Macedonia (21 February 2021)
| Home | Away |
- All statistics correct as of February 21, 2021.

The Italy team for EuroBasket 2022 qualification will represent Italy at the EuroBasket 2022 qualification. Italy has already qualified for the EuroBasket 2022 being one of the host countries. Nevertheless, Italians won four matches and lost two, ending the competition in the first position.

== Timeline ==
First window

- 28 January 2020: submitted the long list of 24 players.
- 3 February 2020: submitted the list of 16 players.
- 12 February 2020: Andrea Pecchia was replaced by Matteo Tambone due to an ankle injury.
- 19 February 2020: submitted list of 12 players for the match against Russia.
- 20–23 February 2020 – First window
  - 20 February 2020: Italy 83 – 64 Russia
  - 23 February 2020: Estonia 81 – 67 Italy

Second window

- 24 October 2020: submitted the long list.
- 21 November 2020: submitted the list of 16 players.
- 23 November 2020: due to light fever Paolo Banchero was excluded from the list if 16 from the team's medical staff.
- 25 November 2020: chosen the final 12 players that will play in Tallinn.
- 27–30 November 2020: The second window
  - 28 November 2020: The match against North Macedonia was postponed due to SARS-CoV-2 cases in the Macedonian team.
  - 30 November 2020: Russia 66 – 70 Italy

Third window

- 1 February 2021: submitted long list of 24 players.
- 7 February 2021: submitted the list 14 player for the Perm bubble.
- 14 February 2021: Simone Zanotti replaces Leonardo Totè.
- 18–21 February 2021: The third window
  - 18 February 2021: Italy 92-84 North Macedonia
  - 19 February 2021: Italy 101-105 Estonia
  - 21 February 2021: North Macedonia 87-78 Italy

== Kit ==
Supplier: Spalding / Sponsor: Barilla

| Home | Away |

== Roster ==
These were the players that coach Sacchetti called for the qualification in the three windows.

| Pos. | No. | Name | Age^{*} | Ht. | vs RUS 20 Febr. 2020 | @ EST 23 Febr. 2020 | @ RUS 30 Nov. 2020 | vs MKD 18 Febr. 2022 | vs EST 19 Febr. 2022 | @ MKD 21 Febr. 2022 |
|---|---|---|---|---|---|---|---|---|---|---|
| PG | 0 | Marco Spissu | 26 | 1.84 | | | | | | |
| SG | 00 | Amedeo Della Valle | 27 | 1.94 | | | | | | |
| PG | 7 | Leonardo Candi | 23 | 1.90 | | | | | | |
| G | 11 | Davide Moretti | 22 | 1.90 | | | | | | |
| SF | 13 | Simone Fontecchio | 25 | 2.03 | | | | | | |
| PG | 13 | Tommaso Baldasso | 23 | 1.91 | | | | | | |
| C | 16 | Amedeo Tessitori | 26 | 2.08 | | | | | | |
| PF | 17 | Giampaolo Ricci | 29 | 2.01 | | | | | | |
| PG | 18 | Matteo Spagnolo | 18 | 1.93 | | | | | | |
| PF | 19 | Raphael Gaspardo | 27 | 2.07 | | | | | | |
| SG | 22 | Giordano Bortolani | 20 | 1.93 | | | | | | |
| PF | 24 | Filippo Baldi Rossi | 29 | 2.07 | | | | | | |
| PG | 25 | Michele Ruzzier | 28 | 1.83 | | | | | | |
| SG | 30 | Matteo Tambone | 26 | 1.92 | | | | | | |
| SG | 31 | Michele Vitali | 29 | 1.96 | | | | | | |
| SF | 32 | Andrea Pecchia | 23 | 1.97 | | | | | | |
| C | 35 | Leonardo Totè | 23 | 2.11 | | | | | | |
| C | 41 | Simone Zanotti | 28 | 2.08 | | | | | | |
| SF | 44 | Davide Alviti | 24 | 2.00 | | | | | | |
| PF | 45 | Nicola Akele | 23 | 2.03 | | | | | | |
| PG | 54 | Alessandro Pajola | 21 | 1.94 | | | | | | |
| SF | 50 | Gabriele Procida | 18 | 2.00 | | | | | | |
| C | 55 | Francesco Candussi | 26 | 2.11 | | | | | | |

Notes

- ^{*} Age on February 21, 2021

Legend

| not called |
| did not play |
| played |
| starting 5 |

== Staff ==
| Position | Staff member | Age | Team |
|---|---|---|---|
| Head coach | Romeo Sacchetti | 67 | Fortitudo Bologna (prev. Vanoli Cremona) |
| Assistant coaches | Emanuele Molin | 61 | Aquila Trento |
| Assistant coaches | Massimo Maffezzoli | 45 | Eurobasket Roma |
| Assistant coaches | Paolo Conti | 51 | Italian Basketball Federation |
| Physical trainer | Matteo Panichi | 48 | Italian Basketball Federation |
| Physician | Sandro Senzameno | 68 | Italian Basketball Federation |
| Orthopaedic | Raffaele Cortina | 60 | Italian Basketball Federation |
| Osteopath | Roberto Oggioni | 45 | Italian Basketball Federation |
| Osteopath | Francesco Ciallella | 40 | Italian Basketball Federation |
| Team manager | Massimo Valle | 54 | Italian Basketball Federation |
| Press officer | Francesco D'Aniello | 40 | Italian Basketball Federation |
| Manager | Roberto Brunamonti | 61 | Italian Basketball Federation |
| Video maker | Marco Cremonini | 32 | Italian Basketball Federation |
| Equipment manager | Curzio Garofoli | 50 | Italian Basketball Federation |
| Equipment manager | Andrea Annessa | 47 | Italian Basketball Federation |

== Qualification ==
The draw was held on 22 July 2019 in Munich, Germany. Italy was drawn into Group B with Estonia, North Macedonia and Russia. These matches will be played in three windows from 17 to 25 February 2020; from 23 November to 1 December 2020 and from 15 to 23 February 2021 with two games played by each team in every window.

Overview

| Competition | First match | Last match | Record | | | | | | | |
| Competition | First match | Last match | Pld | W | D | L | PF | PA | PD | Win % |
|---|---|---|---|---|---|---|---|---|---|---|
| EuroBasket qualification | 20 February 2020 | 21 February 2021 | 6 | 4 | 2 | 0 | 511 | 487 | +24 | 66.67 |
| Total | | | 6 | 4 | 2 | 0 | 511 | 487 | +24 | 66.67 |

Source: Competitions

=== Group B ===
Table

| Pos | Team | Pld | W | L | PF | PA | PD | Pts | Qualification |
|---|---|---|---|---|---|---|---|---|---|
| 1 | Italy | 6 | 4 | 2 | 511 | 487 | +24 | 10 (Note: Italy 153–130 Russia) | EuroBasket 2022 as host |
| 2 | Russia (Note: On 20 May 2022, FIBA suspended Russia from international competitions due to the Russian invasion of Ukraine.) | 6 | 4 | 2 | 460 | 405 | +55 | 10 | Disqualified |
| 3 | Estonia | 6 | 2 | 4 | 459 | 505 | −46 | 8 (Note: Estonia 165–158 North Macedonia) | EuroBasket 2022 |
| 4 | North Macedonia | 6 | 2 | 4 | 473 | 506 | −33 | 8 | |

Source: FIBA
Rules for classification: 1) Points; 2) Head-to-head; 3) Points difference; 4) Points scored.
Notes:

Results summary

| Overall | | | | | | Home | | | | | Away | | | | |
| Pld | W | L | PF | PA | PD | W | L | PF | PA | PD | W | L | PF | PA | PD |
|---|---|---|---|---|---|---|---|---|---|---|---|---|---|---|---|
| 6 | 4 | 2 | 511 | 487 | +24 | 2 | 1 | 276 | 253 | +23 | 2 | 1 | 235 | 234 | +1 |

Source: Competitive matches

Results by round

| Round | 1 | 2 | 3 | 4 | 5 | 6 |
|---|---|---|---|---|---|---|
| Ground | H | A | H | A | H | A |
| Result | W | W | W | W | L | L |
| Position | 1 | 1 | 1 | 1 | 1 | 1 |

Source: Competitive matches
A = Away; H = Home; W = Win; L = Loss; V = Void

==== vs Russia ====
Leonardo Totè had incurred in an injury on the right eye the same day of the match and, because of the FIBA regulation, he couldn't be replaced.

| 20 February 2020 1 | Italy | 83–64 | Russia | Naples, Italy |
| 20:30 (GMT+1) | Scoring by quarter: 26-24, 15-9, 21-18, 21-13 |
| Livebasketball.tv, Sky Sport Arena | Pts: Ricci 19; Rebs: Ricci, Fontecchio 7 Asts: Spissu 10; PIR: Ricci 22 | Boxscore | Pts: Kulagin 17; Rebs: Antipov 6 Asts: Kulagin 8 PIR: Antipov 20 | Arena: PalaBarbuto; Attendance: 4000; Referees: Antonio Conde (ESP), Martin Vulic (CRO), Fernando Calatrava (ESP) |

| Starters: | | | Pts | Reb | Ast |
|---|---|---|---|---|---|
| PG | 0 | Marco Spissu | 10 | 4 | 10 |
| SG | 31 | Michele Vitali | 15 | 4 | 3 |
| SF | 13 | Simone Fontecchio | 10 | 7 | 1 |
| PF | 17 | Giampaolo Ricci | 19 | 7 | 1 |
| C | 16 | Amedeo Tessitori | 6 | 5 | 3 |
| Reserves: | | | | | |
| PG | 18 | Matteo Spagnolo | 3 | 1 | 1 |
| SG | 22 | Giordano Bortolani | 3 | 0 | 0 |
| PF | 24 | Filippo Baldi Rossi | 7 | 3 | 0 |
| PG | 25 | Michele Ruzzier | 7 | 2 | 2 |
| SG | 30 | Matteo Tambone | 0 | 0 | 0 |
| C | 35 | Leonardo Totè | DNP | | |
| PF | 45 | Nicola Akele | 3 | 4 | 0 |
Head coach:
(Italy) Romeo Sacchetti

| Italy | Russia |

| Italy | Statistics | Russia |
|---|---|---|
| 18/33 (54.5%) | 2-pt field goals | 12/27 (44.4%) |
| 13/26 (50.0%) | 3-pt field goals | 9/30 (30.0%) |
| 8/13 (61.5%) | Free throws | 13/19 (68.4%) |
| 9 | Offensive rebounds | 4 |
| 32 | Defensive rebounds | 22 |
| 41 | Total rebounds | 26 |
| 21 | Assists | 15 |
| 20 | Turnovers | 14 |
| 6 | Steals | 9 |
| 3 | Blocks | 2 |
| 21 | Fouls | 22 |

| Starters: | | | Pts | Reb | Ast |
|---|---|---|---|---|---|
| PG | 19 | Ivan Strebkov | 0 | 1 | 2 |
| SG | 22 | Dmitry Kulagin | 17 | 2 | 8 |
| SF | 7 | Vitaly Fridzon | 6 | 1 | 1 |
| PF | 32 | Pavel Antipov | 14 | 6 | 1 |
| C | 8 | Vladimir Ivlev | 10 | 3 | 0 |
| Reserves: | | | | | |
| PG | 2 | Andrei Sopin | 0 | 0 | 0 |
| SG | 4 | Evgeny Baburin | 0 | 2 | 0 |
| PG | 5 | Denis Zakharov | 6 | 1 | 0 |
| PG | 6 | Grigory Motovilov | 10 | 1 | 1 |
| PF | 21 | Stanislav Ilnitskiy | 0 | 1 | 2 |
| C | 31 | Evgeny Valiev | 3 | 3 | 0 |
| C | 64 | Artem Klimenko | 0 | 0 | 0 |
Head coach:
(Russia) Sergei Bazarevich

==== @ Estonia ====
| 23 February 2020 2 | Estonia | 81–87 | Italy | Tallinn, Estonia |
| 19:00 (GMT+2) | Scoring by quarter: 18-18, 29-23, 14-18, 20-28 |
| Livebasketball.tv, Sky Sport HD | Pts: Kitsing 22; Rebs: Jõesaar 9 Asts: Kullamäe 6 PIR: Kitsing 22 | Boxscore | Pts: Vitali 22; Rebs: Ricci, Vitali, Akele 4 Asts: Spissu 8 PIR: Ricci 23 | Arena: Saku Suurhall; Attendance: 7500; Referees: Aleksandar Glisić (SRB), Martin Horozov (BGR), Andrei Sharapa (BLR) |

| Starters: | | | Pts | Reb | Ast |
|---|---|---|---|---|---|
| PG | 77 | Kristian Kullamäe | 17 | 2 | 6 |
| SG | 2 | Sander Raieste | 3 | 5 | 1 |
| SF | 21 | Janari Jõesaar | 7 | 9 | 2 |
| PF | 11 | Siim-Sander Vene | 21 | 5 | 2 |
| C | 33 | Kristjan Kitsing | 22 | 3 | 1 |
| Reserves: | | | | | |
| SF | 0 | Henri Drell | 5 | 1 | 0 |
| PF | 3 | Kregor Hermet | 2 | 1 | 1 |
| SG | 4 | Rain Veideman | 2 | 2 | 1 |
| SF | 13 | Kaspar Treier | 0 | 1 | 0 |
| C | 20 | Rauno Nurger | 2 | 1 | 0 |
| PG | 22 | Martin Dorbek | 0 | 0 | 0 |
| PG | 44 | Kerr Kriisa | 0 | 1 | 5 |
Head coach:
(Finland) Jukka Toijala

| Estonia | Italy |

| Estonia | Statistics | Italy |
|---|---|---|
| 15/31 (48.4%) | 2-pt field goals | 21/32 (65.6%) |
| 13/36 (36.1%) | 3-pt field goals | 10/26 (38.5%) |
| 12/14 (85.7%) | Free throws | 15/18 (83.3%) |
| 16 | Offensive rebounds | 10 |
| 17 | Defensive rebounds | 20 |
| 33 | Total rebounds | 30 |
| 19 | Assists | 20 |
| 18 | Turnovers | 16 |
| 8 | Steals | 10 |
| 3 | Blocks | 3 |
| 20 | Fouls | 18 |

| Starters: | | | Pts | Reb | Ast |
|---|---|---|---|---|---|
| PG | 0 | Marco Spissu | 9 | 2 | 8 |
| SG | 31 | Michele Vitali | 22 | 4 | 1 |
| SF | 13 | Simone Fontecchio | 9 | 3 | 1 |
| PF | 17 | Giampaolo Ricci | 18 | 4 | 6 |
| C | 16 | Amedeo Tessitori | 6 | 2 | 0 |
| Reserves: | | | | | |
| PG | 18 | Matteo Spagnolo | 0 | 0 | 0 |
| SG | 22 | Giordano Bortolani | DNP | | |
| PF | 24 | Filippo Baldi Rossi | 10 | 2 | 1 |
| PG | 25 | Michele Ruzzier | 2 | 1 | 2 |
| SG | 30 | Matteo Tambone | 0 | 2 | 0 |
| PF | 45 | Nicola Akele | 8 | 4 | 0 |
| C | 55 | Francesco Candussi | 3 | 3 | 1 |
Head coach:
(Italy) Romeo Sacchetti

==== vs North Macedonia ====
Because of the COVID-19 pandemic the matches of the second window against North Macedonia and Russia have been arranged to be played behind closed doors, in the protected bubble of the Saku Suurhall in Tallinn.

But the first of the two matches against North Macedonia that was initially scheduled to be played on November 28, was postponed because three Macedonian players were found positive to SARS-CoV-2. The FIBA Medical Commission was forced to defer the game. The match was finally played in the third window on 18 February 2021 in the Perm bubble in Russia.

| 18 February 2021 3 | Italy | 92–84 | North Macedonia | Perm (Russia) |
| time = 19:30 (GMT+5) | Scoring by quarter: 25-23, 16-20, 22-21, 29-20 |
| Livebasketball.tv, Sky Sport HD | Pts: Tessitori 18; Rebs: Ricci 7 Asts: Spissu 9 PIR: Tessitori 21 | Boxscore | Pts: Dimitrijević 24; Rebs: Trajkovski 7 Asts: Dimitrijević 12; PIR: Dimitrijević 22 | Arena: Molot Sports Hall; Referees: Tomas Jasevičius (LTU), Yener Yilmaz (TUR), Alexandre Deman (FRA) |

| Starters: | | | Pts | Reb | Ast |
|---|---|---|---|---|---|
| PG | 0 | Marco Spissu | 13 | 2 | 9 |
| SG | 7 | Leonardo Candi | 9 | 3 | 2 |
| SF | 44 | Davide Alviti | 8 | 6 | 1 |
| PF | 17 | Giampaolo Ricci | 11 | 7 | 1 |
| C | 16 | Amedeo Tessitori | 18 | 6 | 3 |
| Reserves: | | | | | |
| SG | 00 | Amedeo Della Valle | 8 | 1 | 1 |
| PG | 13 | Tommaso Baldasso | 8 | 4 | 2 |
| PG | 18 | Matteo Spagnolo | 0 | 0 | 0 |
| SG | 22 | Giordano Bortolani | 7 | 2 | 0 |
| PF | 24 | Filippo Baldi Rossi | 3 | 4 | 2 |
| PF | 45 | Nicola Akele | 7 | 2 | 2 |
| SF | 50 | Gabriele Procida | DNP | | |
Head coach:
(Italy) Romeo Sacchetti

| Italy | North Macedonia |

| Italy | Statistics | North Macedonia |
|---|---|---|
| 19/40 (47.5%) | 2-pt field goals | 22/39 (56.4%) |
| 14/35 (40.0%) | 3-pt field goals | 7/22 (32.8%) |
| 12/15 (80.0%) | Free throws | 19/28 (67.9%) |
| 11 | Offensive rebounds | 5 |
| 32 | Defensive rebounds | 30 |
| 43 | Total rebounds | 35 |
| 23 | Assists | 18 |
| 6 | Turnovers | 8 |
| 6 | Steals | 1 |
| 0 | Blocks | 6 |
| 20 | Fouls | 18 |

| Starters: | | | Pts | Reb | Ast |
|---|---|---|---|---|---|
| PG | 7 | Nenad Dimitrijević | 24 | 2 | 12 |
| SG | 8 | Vojdan Stojanovski | 15 | 3 | 3 |
| SF | 19 | Damjan Stojanovski | 3 | 3 | 0 |
| PF | 12 | Bojan Trajkovski | 11 | 7 | 1 |
| C | 24 | Jacob Wiley | 17 | 6 | 1 |
| Reserves: | | | | | |
| C | 0 | Bojan Krstevski | 5 | 3 | 0 |
| SG | 4 | Andrej Mitrevski | DNP | | |
| SG | 5 | Kristijan Nikolov | 0 | 0 | 1 |
| PG | 9 | Andrej Magdevski | 4 | 1 | 0 |
| PF | 11 | Stojan Gjuroski | 5 | 2 | 0 |
| C | 15 | Teodor Simić | DNP | | |
| SF | 20 | Damjan Robev | 0 | 0 | 0 |
Head coach:
(North Macedonia) Aleksandar Todorov

==== @ Russia ====
| 30 November 2020 4 | Russia | 66–70 | Italy | Tallinn, Estonia |
| 16:00 (GMT+2) | Scoring by quarter: 15-15, 16-21, 13-14, 22-20 |
| Livebasketball.tv, Sky Sport Arena | Pts: Vorontsevich 11; Rebs: Vorontsevich 11; Asts: Strebkov, Vorontsevich, Kulagin 4 PIR: Vorontsevich 17 | Boxscore | Pts: Tessitori 27; Rebs: Tessitori 9 Asts: Della Valle, Spissu 5 PIR: Tessitori 26 | Arena: Saku Suurhall; Attendance: behind closed doors Referees: Antonio Conde (ESP), Martins Kozlovskis (LAT), Dariusz Zapolski (POL) |

| Starters: | | | Pts | Reb | Ast |
|---|---|---|---|---|---|
| PG | 27 | Mikhail Kulagin | 7 | 6 | 4 |
| SG | 4 | Evgeny Baburin | 8 | 5 | 2 |
| SF | 21 | Andrey Lopatin | 0 | 4 | 0 |
| PF | 20 | Andrey Vorontsevich | 11 | 11 | 4 |
| C | 8 | Vladimir Ivlev | 6 | 1 | 1 |
| Reserves: | | | | | |
| SG | 6 | Grigory Motovilov | 8 | 0 | 0 |
| PF | 14 | Nikita Balashov | DNP | | |
| SG | 15 | Maksim Grigoryev | DNP | | |
| PG | 19 | Ivan Strebkov | 8 | 3 | 4 |
| SF | 21 | Stanislav Ilnitskiy | 5 | 4 | 0 |
| PF | 31 | Evgeni Valiev | 4 | 6 | 0 |
| SF | 32 | Pavel Antipov | 9 | 5 | 1 |
Head coach:
(Russia) Sergei Bazarevich

| Russia | Italy |

| Russia | Statistics | Italy |
|---|---|---|
| 17/33 (51.5%) | 2-pt field goals | 17/33 (51.5%) |
| 7/30 (23.3%) | 3-pt field goals | 7/23 (30.4%) |
| 11/18 (61.1%) | Free throws | 15/26 (57.7%) |
| 16 | Offensive rebounds | 10 |
| 31 | Defensive rebounds | 26 |
| 47 | Total rebounds | 36 |
| 16 | Assists | 16 |
| 14 | Turnovers | 10 |
| 1 | Steals | 10 |
| 0 | Blocks | 1 |
| 24 | Fouls | 26 |

| Starters: | | | Pts | Reb | Ast |
|---|---|---|---|---|---|
| PG | 54 | Alessandro Pajola | 5 | 5 | 3 |
| SG | 0 | Marco Spissu | 11 | 4 | 5 |
| SF | 31 | Michele Vitali | 2 | 2 | 0 |
| PF | 17 | Giampaolo Ricci | 12 | 4 | 1 |
| C | 16 | Amedeo Tessitori | 27 | 9 | 0 |
| Reserves: | | | | | |
| G/F | 00 | Amedeo Della Valle | 3 | 1 | 5 |
| SG | 11 | Davide Moretti | 3 | 0 | 0 |
| PG | 13 | Tommaso Baldasso | 0 | 1 | 0 |
| PF | 19 | Raphael Gaspardo | 4 | 3 | 1 |
| SF | 32 | Andrea Pecchia | 1 | 1 | 0 |
| SF | 44 | Davide Alviti | 0 | 1 | 1 |
| PF | 45 | Nicola Akele | 2 | 1 | 0 |
Head coach:
(Italy) Romeo Sacchetti

==== vs Estonia ====
The third and last window, together with the postponed game against North Macedonia, was played in the Perm bubble in Russia in order to limit the exposure to the COVID-19 pandemic. All games were played behind closed doors.

| 19 February 2021 5 | Italy | 101–105(OT) | Estonia | Perm (Russia) |
| 16:30 (GMT+5) | Scoring by quarter: 21-20, 23-34, 22-28, 28-12, Overtime: 7-11 |
| Livebasketball.tv, Sky Sport HD | Pts: Vitali 24; Rebs: Vitali 9 Asts: Spissu 6 PIR: Vitali 34 | Boxscore | Pts: Kotsar 32; Rebs: Treier 6 Asts: Sokk 14; PIR: Kotsar 25 | Arena: Molot Sports Hall; Referees: Yener Yilmaz (TUR), Zdenko Tomasović (SVK), Gvidas Gedvilas (LTU) |

| Starters: | | | Pts | Reb | Ast |
|---|---|---|---|---|---|
| PG | 0 | Marco Spissu | 16 | 2 | 6 |
| SG | 18 | Matteo Spagnolo | 9 | 4 | 1 |
| SF | 31 | Michele Vitali | 24 | 9 | 5 |
| PF | 17 | Giampaolo Ricci | 19 | 2 | 3 |
| C | 16 | Amedeo Tessitori | 6 | 0 | 1 |
| Reserves: | | | | | |
| SG | 00 | Amedeo Della Valle | 4 | 0 | 2 |
| PG | 7 | Leonardo Candi | 5 | 2 | 3 |
| PG | 13 | Tommaso Baldasso | 6 | 0 | 2 |
| SG | 41 | Simone Zanotti | DNP | | |
| SF | 44 | Davide Alviti | 8 | 0 | 3 |
| PF | 45 | Nicola Akele | 4 | 2 | 2 |
| SF | 50 | Gabriele Procida | 0 | 0 | 0 |
Head coach:
(Italy) Romeo Sacchetti

| Italy | Estonia |

| Italy | Statistics | Estonia |
|---|---|---|
| 19/29 (65.5%) | 2-pt field goals | 30/46 (65.2%) |
| 13/28 (46.4%) | 3-pt field goals | 9/25 (36.0%) |
| 24/24 (100%) | Free throws | 18/21 (85.7%) |
| 7 | Offensive rebounds | 15 |
| 15 | Defensive rebounds | 16 |
| 22 | Total rebounds | 31 |
| 28 | Assists | 29 |
| 22 | Turnovers | 21 |
| 9 | Steals | 6 |
| 1 | Blocks | 1 |
| 27 | Fouls | 26 |

| Starters: | | | Pts | Reb | Ast |
|---|---|---|---|---|---|
| PG | 22 | Martin Dorbek | 0 | 4 | 2 |
| SG | 77 | Kristian Kullamäe | 10 | 2 | 4 |
| SF | 21 | Janari Jõesaar | 13 | 3 | 4 |
| PF | 3 | Kaspar Treier | 17 | 6 | 2 |
| C | 15 | Maik Kotsar | 32 | 1 | 0 |
| Reserves: | | | | | |
| SF | 0 | Henri Drell | 12 | 2 | 1 |
| SG | 1 | Märt Rosenthal | DNP | | |
| PG | 5 | Rait-Riivo Laane | DNP | | |
| PG | 7 | Sten Sokk | 3 | 3 | 14 |
| SG | 8 | Robert Valge | DNP | | |
| PF | 13 | Kregor Hermet | 9 | 1 | 0 |
| C | 20 | Rauno Nurger | 9 | 2 | 0 |
Head coach:
(Finland) Jukka Toijala

==== @ North Macedonia ====
| 21 February 2021 6 | North Macedonia | 87–78 | Italy | Perm (Russia) |
| 17:00 (GMT+5) | Scoring by quarter: 20-30, 21-22, 26-13, 20-13 |
| Livebasketball.tv, Sky Sport HD | Pts: Dimitrijević 22; Rebs: Wiley 7 Asts: Dimitrijević 7 PIR: Magdevski 28 | Boxscore | Pts: Spissu 17; Rebs: Akele 4 Asts: Spissu 8 PIR: Spissu 22 | Arena: Molot Sports Hall; Referees: Yener Yilmaz (TUR), Zdenko Tomasović (SVK), Deman Alexandre (FRA) |

| Starters: | | | Pts | Reb | Ast |
|---|---|---|---|---|---|
| PG | 7 | Nenad Dimitrijević | 22 | 5 | 7 |
| SG | 8 | Vojdan Stojanovski | 16 | 4 | 4 |
| SF | 19 | Damjan Stojanovski | 8 | 1 | 0 |
| PF | 12 | Bojan Trajkovski | 4 | 4 | 2 |
| C | 24 | Jacob Wiley | 13 | 7 | 1 |
| Reserves: | | | | | |
| C | 0 | Bojan Krstevski | 2 | 2 | 0 |
| SG | 5 | Kristijan Nikolov | 2 | 0 | 1 |
| PG | 9 | Andrej Magdevski | 20 | 4 | 4 |
| PF | 11 | Stojan Gjuroski | 0 | 3 | 1 |
| SF | 19 | Damjan Stojanovski | 8 | 1 | 0 |
| SF | 20 | Damjan Robev | DNP | | |
| PG | 21 | Luka Savićević | DNP | | |
Head coach:
(North Macedonia) Aleksandar Todorov

| North Macedonia | Italy |

| North Macedonia | Statistics | Italy |
|---|---|---|
| 18/33 (54.5%) | 2-pt field goals | 14/32 (43.8%) |
| 11/27 (40.7%) | 3-pt field goals | 12/24 (40.0%) |
| 18/20 (90.0%) | Free throws | 14/18 (77.8%) |
| 6 | Offensive rebounds | 5 |
| 27 | Defensive rebounds | 25 |
| 33 | Total rebounds | 30 |
| 20 | Assists | 24 |
| 14 | Turnovers | 16 |
| 6 | Steals | 8 |
| 2 | Blocks | 1 |
| 23 | Fouls | 22 |

| Starters: | | | Pts | Reb | Ast |
|---|---|---|---|---|---|
| PG | 0 | Marco Spissu | 17 | 2 | 8 |
| SG | 31 | Michele Vitali | 11 | 3 | 2 |
| SF | 22 | Giordano Bortolani | 11 | 2 | 0 |
| PF | 17 | Giampaolo Ricci | 2 | 3 | 2 |
| C | 24 | Filippo Baldi Rossi | 6 | 2 | 2 |
| Reserves: | | | | | |
| PG | 7 | Leonardo Candi | 3 | 2 | 4 |
| PG | 13 | Tommaso Baldasso | DNP | | |
| PG | 18 | Matteo Spagnolo | 7 | 3 | 1 |
| C | 41 | Simone Zanotti | 0 | 1 | 0 |
| SF | 44 | Davide Alviti | 7 | 3 | 2 |
| PF | 45 | Nicola Akele | 4 | 4 | 1 |
| SF | 50 | Gabriele Procida | 10 | 3 | 2 |
Head coach:
(Italy) Romeo Sacchetti

== Statistics ==
=== Individual statistics ===
| No. | Player | GC | GP | GS | MPG | 2FG% | 3FG% | FT% | RPG | APG | SPG | BPG | EF | PPG |
|---|---|---|---|---|---|---|---|---|---|---|---|---|---|---|
| 0 | Marco Spissu | 6 | 6 | 6 | 28.7 | 45.8% (1.8/4.0) | 43.3% (2.2/5.0) | 88.2% (2.5/2.8) | 2.7 | 7.7 | 1.8 | 0.0 | 17.2 | 12.7 |
| 00 | Amedeo Della Valle | 3 | 3 | 0 | 13.3 | 50.0% (1.3/2.7) | 0.0% (0.0/1.7) | 77.8% (2.3/3.0) | 0.7 | 2.7 | 0.7 | 0.0 | 5.3 | 5.0 |
| 7 | Leonardo Candi | 3 | 3 | 1 | 18.1 | 28.6% (0.7/2.3) | 66.7% (1.3/2.0) | 100% (0.3/0.3) | 2.3 | 3.0 | 0.7 | 0.0 | 8.7 | 5.7 |
| 11 | Davide Moretti | 1 | 1 | 0 | 7.5 | - | 100% (1.0/1.0) | 100% (1.0/1.0) | 0.0 | 0.0 | 0.0 | 0.0 | 2.0 | 3.0 |
| 13 | Simone Fontecchio | 2 | 2 | 2 | 29.3 | 40.0% (2.0/5.0) | 50.0% (1.5/3.0) | 100% (1.0/1.0) | 5.0 | 1.0 | 1.5 | 0.5 | 10.5 | 9.5 |
| 13 | Tommaso Baldasso | 4 | 3 | 0 | 14.4 | 50.0% (1.3/2.7) | 33.3% (0.7/2.0) | - | 1.7 | 1.3 | 0.3 | 0.0 | 4.7 | 4.7 |
| 16 | Amedeo Tessitori | 5 | 5 | 5 | 18.7 | 73.5% (5.0/6.8) | 33.3% (0.2/0.6) | 55.6% (2.0/3.6) | 4.4 | 1.4 | 0.6 | 0.4 | 13.2 | 12.6 |
| 17 | Giampaolo Ricci | 6 | 6 | 6 | 26.5 | 50.0% (2.0/4.0) | 54.5% (3.0/5.5) | 75.0% (0.5/0.7) | 4.5 | 2.3 | 1.2 | 0.3 | 15.3 | 13.5 |
| 18 | Matteo Spagnolo | 5 | 5 | 1 | 11.0 | 50.0% (1.4/2.8) | - | 93.3% (1.0/1.2) | 1.6 | 0.6 | 0.4 | 0.0 | 3.2 | 3.8 |
| 19 | Raphael Gaspardo | 1 | 1 | 0 | 15.0 | 50.0% (1.0/2.0) | 0.0% (0.0/3.0) | 66.7% (2.0/3.0) | 3.0 | 1.0 | 1.0 | 0.0 | 2.0 | 4.0 |
| 22 | Giordano Bortolani | 4 | 3 | 1 | 11.7 | 71.4% (1.7/2.3) | 75.5% (1.0/1.3) | 100% (0.7/0.7) | 1.3 | 0.0 | 0.0 | 0.0 | 7.3 | 7.0 |
| 24 | Filippo Baldi Rossi | 4 | 4 | 1 | 13.2 | 58.8% (1.8/3.2) | 40.0% (1.0/2.5) | - | 2.8 | 1.3 | 0.3 | 0.3 | 7.0 | 6.5 |
| 25 | Michele Ruzzier | 2 | 2 | 0 | 15.4 | 50.0% (1.0/2.0) | 33.3% (0.5/1.5) | 50.0% (1.0/2.0) | 1.5 | 2.0 | 0.5 | 0.0 | 3.0 | 4.5 |
| 30 | Matteo Tambone | 2 | 2 | 0 | 4.9 | - | 0.0% (0.0/0.5) | - | 1.0 | 0.0 | 0.0 | 0.0 | -0.5 | 0.0 |
| 31 | Michele Vitali | 5 | 5 | 5 | 28.8 | 50.0% (1.6/3.2) | 40.0% (2.0/5.0) | 90.3% (5.6/6.2) | 4.4 | 2.2 | 1.6 | 0.0 | 17.0 | 14.8 |
| 32 | Andrea Pecchia | 1 | 1 | 0 | 4.3 | - | - | 25.0% (1.0/4.0) | 1.0 | 0.0 | 0.0 | 0.0 | -1.0 | 1.0 |
| 35 | Leonardo Totè | 1 | 0 | 0 | 0.0 | - | - | - | 0.0 | 0.0 | 0.0 | 0.0 | 0.0 | 0.0 |
| 41 | Simone Zanotti | 2 | 1 | 0 | 12.3 | 0.0% (0.0/0.1) | 0.0% (0.0/0.1) | - | 1.0 | 0.0 | 0.0 | 0.0 | -1.0 | 0.0 |
| 44 | Davide Alviti | 4 | 4 | 1 | 18.5 | 50.0% (1.0/2.0) | 33.3% (1.0/3.0) | 75.0% (0.8/1.0) | 2.5 | 1.8 | 1.0 | 0.0 | 6.5 | 5.8 |
| 45 | Nicola Akele | 6 | 6 | 0 | 17.1 | 75.0% (1.5/2.0) | 28.6% (0.3/1.2) | 80.0% (0.7/0.8) | 2.8 | 0.8 | 0.5 | 0.5 | 6.5 | 4.7 |
| 54 | Alessandro Pajola | 1 | 1 | 1 | 30.0 | 33.3% (1.0/3.0) | 0.0% (0.0/1.0) | 75.5% (3.0/4.0) | 5.0 | 3.0 | 0.0 | 0.0 | 7.0 | 5.0 |
| 50 | Gabriele Procida | 3 | 2 | 0 | 12.7 | 50.0% (1.0/2.0) | 50.0% (1.0/2.0) | - | 1.5 | 1.0 | 0.0 | 0.0 | 5.5 | 5.0 |
| 55 | Francesco Candussi | 1 | 1 | 0 | 5.8 | - | 100% (1.0/1.0) | - | 3.0 | 1.0 | 0.0 | 0.0 | 7.0 | 3.0 |

=== Individual game highs ===
| | Total | Player | Opponent |
|---|---|---|---|
| Points | 27 | Amedeo Tessitori | @ Russia (30/11/2020) |
| Total Rebounds | 9 | Amedeo Tessitori | @ Russia (30/11/2020) |
| Total Rebounds | 9 | Michele Vitali | vs Estonia^{OT} (19/2/2021) |
| Assists | 10 | Marco Spissu | vs Russia (20/2/2020) |
| Blocks | 2 | Giampaolo Ricci | @ Estonia (23/2/2020) |
| Steals | 3 | Simone Fontecchio | @ Estonia (23/2/2020) |
| Steals | 3 | Marco Spissu | @ Russia (30/11/2020) |
| Steals | 3 | Michele Vitali | vs Estonia^{OT} (19/2/2021) |
| Steals | 3 | Marco Spissu | @ North Macedonia (21/2/2021) |
| Efficiency | 34 | Michele Vitali | vs Estonia^{OT} (19/2/2021) |
| 2-point field goal percentage^{5} | 80% (4/5) | Michele Vitali | vs Russia (20/2/2020) |
| 3-point field goal percentage | 100% (2/2) | Filippo Baldi Rossi | @ North Macedonia (21/2/2021) |
| Free throw percentage | 100% (13/13) | Michele Vitali | vs Estonia^{OT} (19/2/2021) |
| Turnovers | 5 | Amedeo Tessitori | vs Russia (20/2/2020) |
| Minutes | 36.3 | Michele Vitali | vs Estonia^{OT} (19/2/2021) |

Notes

- ^5 at least 5 attempts
- ^OT match ended in overtime

| | Total | Player | Opponent |
|---|---|---|---|
| 2-point field goals made | 11 | Amedeo Tessitori | @ Russia (30/11/2020) |
| 2-point field goals attempted | 16 | Amedeo Tessitori | @ Russia (30/11/2020) |
| 3-point field goals made | 4 | Giampaolo Ricci | @ Estonia (23/2/2020) |
| 3-point field goals attempted | 10 | Giampaolo Ricci | vs Estonia^{OT} (19/2/2021) |
| Free throws made | 13 | Michele Vitali | vs Estonia^{OT} (19/2/2021) |
| Free throws attempted | 13 | Michele Vitali | vs Estonia^{OT} (19/2/2021) |
| Offensive Rebounds | 5 | Amedeo Tessitori | @ Russia (30/11/2020) |
| Defensive Rebounds | 7 | Simone Fontecchio | vs Russia (20/2/2020) |
| Defensive Rebounds | 7 | Michele Vitali | vs Estonia^{OT} (19/2/2021) |

=== Team game highs ===
| Statistic | Total | Opponent |
|---|---|---|
| Points | 105 | vs Estonia^{OT} (19/2/2021) |
| Total Rebounds | 43 | vs North Macedonia (18/2/2021) |
| Assists | 28 | vs Estonia^{OT} (19/2/2021) |
| Blocks | 3 | vs Russia (20/2/2020) @ Estonia (23/2/2020) |
| Steals | 10 | @ Russia (30/11/2020) |
| Efficiency | 114 | vs Estonia^{OT} (19/2/2021) |
| 2-point field goal percentage | 65.5% | vs Estonia^{OT} (19/2/2021) |
| 3-point field goal percentage | 50.0% | vs Russia (20/2/2020) |
| Free throw percentage | 100% | vs Estonia^{OT} (19/2/2021) |
| Turnovers | 6 | vs North Macedonia (18/2/2021) |

| Statistic | Total | Opponent |
|---|---|---|
| 2-point field goals made | 19 | vs North Macedonia (18/2/2021) vs Estonia^{OT} (19/2/2021) |
| 2-point field goals attempted | 40 | vs North Macedonia (18/2/2021) |
| 3-point field goals made | 14 | vs North Macedonia (18/2/2021) |
| 3-point field goals attempted | 36 | @ Estonia (23/2/2020) |
| Free throws made | 24 | vs Estonia^{OT} (19/2/2021) |
| Free throws attempted | 26 | @ Russia (30/11/2020) |
| Offensive Rebounds | 16 | @ Estonia (23/2/2020) |
| Defensive Rebounds | 32 | vs Russia (20/2/2020) vs North Macedonia (18/2/2021) |

Notes

- ^OT match ended in overtime

== See also ==
- EuroBasket 2022 qualification
