= Italy team for FIBA World Cup 2023 qualification =

Italy
2021-22 season
- President: Gianni Petrucci
- Head coach: Romeo Sacchetti
- Qualifiers: 2023 FIBA Basketball World Cup qualification
Home	Away
- All statistics correct as of 23 November 2021.

The Italy team for FIBA World Cup 2023 qualification will represent Italy at the 2023 FIBA Basketball World Cup.

== Timeline ==
- 31 August 2021: the draw is held in Switzerland and Italy goes in the Group H with Russia, Netherlands and Iceland.

First window

- 10 November 2021: submitted the long list of 24 players.
- 16 November 2021: submitted the list of 16 players.
- 22 November 2021: Mannion and Totè are replaced with Flaccadori and Udom, for health reason.
- 24 November 2021: submitted the final list of 12 players for the match against Russia.
- 26 November 2021: Russia 92 – 78 Italy.
- 24 November 2021: submitted the final list of 12 players for the match against Netherlands.

== Kit ==
Supplier: Spalding / Sponsor: Barilla

Home	Away

== Roster ==
The following 16 players were called by Matteo Sacchetti for the first window against Netherlands.

Italy national basketball team – FIBA World Cup 2023 Qualifiers roster
Players
Coaches

Pos.	No.	Name	Age – Date of birth	Height	Club	Ctr.
PG	4	Leonardo Candi	24 – 30 March 1997	1.90 m (6 ft 3 in)	UNAHOTELS Reggio Emilia	(Italy)
SG	7	Stefano Tonut	27 – 7 November 1993	1.94 m (6 ft 4 in)	Umana Reyer Venezia	(Italy)
SG	12	Diego Flaccadori	25 – 5 April 1996	1.95 m (6 ft 5 in)	Dolomiti Energia Trento	(Italy)
PG	14	Bruno Mascolo	25 – 24 March 1996	1.90 m (6 ft 3 in)	Bertram Derthona Basket	(Italy)
C	16	Amedeo Tessitori	26 – 7 October 1994	2.08 m (6 ft 10 in)	Virtus Bologna	(Italy)
PG	18	Matteo Spagnolo	18 – 10 January 2003	1.94 m (6 ft 4 in)	Vanoli Cremona	(Italy)
F	19	Raphael Gaspardo	28 – 3 August 1993	2.07 m (6 ft 9 in)	Happy Casa Brindisi	(Italy)
PF	20	Mattia Udom	27 – 17 November 1993	2.00 m (6 ft 7 in)	Happy Casa Brindisi	(Italy)
SG	22	Giordano Bortolani	20 – 2 December 2000	1.93 m (6 ft 4 in)	NutriBullet Treviso	(Italy)
SG	31	Michele Vitali (C)	30 – 31 October 1991	1.96 m (6 ft 5 in)	Umana Reyer Venezia	(Italy)
C	34	Mouhamet Diouf	20 – 10 September 2001	2.06 m (6 ft 9 in)	UNAHOTELS Reggio Emilia	(Italy)
SF	44	Davide Alviti	25 – 5 November 1996	2.01 m (6 ft 7 in)	AX Armani Exchange Milano	(Italy)
PF	45	Nicola Akele	24 – 7 November 1997	2.03 m (6 ft 8 in)	NutriBullet Treviso	(Italy)
SF	50	Gabriele Procida	19 – 1 June 2002	2.01 m (6 ft 7 in)	Fortitudo Kigili Bologna	(Italy)
PF	52	Alessandro Lever	22 – 4 December 1998	2.08 m (6 ft 10 in)	Allianz Pallacanestro Trieste	(Italy)
PG	54	Alessandro Pajola	21 – 9 November 1999	1.94 m (6 ft 4 in)	Virtus Bologna	(Italy)

Head coach

- (Italy) Meo Sacchetti

Assistant coach(es)

- (Italy) Emanuele Molin
- (Italy) Piero Bucchi
- (Italy) Paolo Galbiati
- (Italy) Riccardo Fois

Legend

- (C) Team captain
- Club – describes last
  club before the competition
- Age – describes age
  on 29 November 2021

=== Depth chart ===
Pos.	Starting 5	Bench 1	Bench 2
C	Nicolo Melli	Paul Biligha
PF	Danilo Gallinari	Achille Polonara	Giampaolo Ricci
SF	Simone Fontecchio	Luigi Datome
SG	Stefano Tonut	Tommaso Baldasso
PG	Marco Spissu	Nico Mannion	Alessandro Pajola

=== All Games ===
These were the players that coach Sacchetti called for the qualification in the three windows.

Pos.	No.	Name	Age^{*}	Ht.	@ RUS 26 Nov. 2021	vs NLD 29 Nov. 2021
PG	4	Leonardo Candi	24	1.90		
SG	7	Stefano Tonut	26	1.44		
SG	12	Diego Flaccadori	25	1.95		
PG	14	Bruno Mascolo	25	1.90		
C	16	Amedeo Tessitori	27	2.08		
PG	18	Matteo Spagnolo	18	1.94		
F	19	Raphael Gaspardo	28	2.07		
PF	20	Mattia Udom	28	2.00		
SG	22	Giordano Bortolani	20	1.93		
SG	31	Michele Vitali	29	1.96		
C	34	Mouhamed Diouf	20	1.90		
SF	44	Davide Alviti	25	2.01		
PF	45	Nicola Akele	24	2.03		
PF	52	Alessandro Lever	22	2.03		
PG	54	Alessandro Pajola	22	1.94		

Notes

- ^{*} Age on November 29, 2021

Legend

not called
did not play
played
starting 5

== Staff ==
After the EuroBasket 2022 qualification tournament the staff team was updated: Piero Bucchi, Paolo Galbiati and Riccardo Fois were hired as assistant coaches and replaced Massimo Maffezzoli and Paolo Conti. Only Emanuele Molin was confirmed amongst the assistant coaches.

Position	Staff member	Age	Team
Head coach	Meo Sacchetti	72	Italian Basketball Federation
Assistant coaches	Emanuele Molin	65	Aquila Trento
Assistant coaches	Piero Bucchi	67	Dinamo Sassari
Assistant coaches	Paolo Galbiati	41	Vanoli Cremona
Assistant coaches	Riccardo Fois	38	Arizona Wildcats
Physical trainer	Matteo Panichi	53	Italian Basketball Federation
Physical trainer	Fabrizio Santolamazza	41	Italian Basketball Federation
Physician	Sandro Senzameno	73	Italian Basketball Federation
Orthopaedic	Raffaele Cortina	65	Italian Basketball Federation
Osteopath	Roberto Oggioni	50	Italian Basketball Federation
Osteopath	Francesco Ciallella	45	Italian Basketball Federation
Team manager	Massimo Valle	59	Italian Basketball Federation
Press officer	Francesco D'Aniello	44	Italian Basketball Federation
Manager	Roberto Brunamonti	66	Italian Basketball Federation
Video maker	Marco Cremonini	37	Italian Basketball Federation
Equipment manager	Curzio Garofoli	55	Italian Basketball Federation
Equipment manager	Andrea Annessa	51	Italian Basketball Federation

== Qualification ==
Overview

Competition	First match	Last match	Record							
Competition	First match	Last match	Pld	W	D	L	PF	PA	PD	Win %
EuroBasket qualification	26 November 2021	4 July 2022	0	0	0	0	0	0	+0	—
Total			0	0	0	0	0	0	+0	—

Source: Competitions

=== First round, Group H ===
The draw was held on 31 August 2021 in Mies, Switzerland. Italy was drawn into Group H with Russia, Netherlands and Iceland. These matches will be played in three windows from 26 to 29 November 2021, from 24 to 27 February 2022 and from 1 to 4 July 2022 with two games played by each team in every window.

==== @ Russia ====
26 November 2021 1	Russia	92–78	Italy	Saint Petersburg, Russia
19:00 (GMT+3)	Scoring by quarter: 15-14, 22-23, 27-22, 28-19
Livebasketball.tv	Pts: Astapkovich 21; Rebs: Astapkovich 5 Asts: Zaytsev 8 PIR: Astapkovich 5	Boxscore	Pts: Tonut 20; Rebs: Tessitori, Akele 6 Asts: Flaccadori 7 PIR: Tessitori 23	Arena: Yubileyny Sports Palace; Referees: Ademir Zurapovic (BIH), Gvidas Gedvilas (LTU), Radomir Vojinovic (MNE)

Starters:			Pts	Reb	Ast
PG	77	Aleksandr Khomenko	8	1	4
SG	19	Ivan Strebkov	10	3	5
SF	25	Anton Astapkovich	21	5	2
PF	11	Semyon Antonov	17	2	2
C	58	Sergei Toropov	6	1	1
Reserves:					
C	8	Vladimir Ivlev	4	2	0
C	10	Alexander Gankevich	2	0	0
SF	21	Stanislav Ilnitsky	4	1	0
PF	31	Evgeny Valiev	0	1	1
SG	35	Vladislav Emchenko	0	0	0
SG	44	Artem Komolov	12	2	3
PG	88	Vyacheslav Zaytsev	7	2	8
Head coach:
(Serbia) Zoran Lukić

Russia	Italy

Russia	Statistics	Italy
20/34 (58.2%)	2-pt field goals	12/29 (41.4%)
12/21 (57.1%)	3-pt field goals	9/21 (42.9%)
16/18 (88.9%)	Free throws	27/30 (90.0%)
8	Offensive rebounds	9
19	Defensive rebounds	14
27	Total rebounds	23
25	Assists	16
14	Turnovers	14
5	Steals	8
3	Blocks	1
27	Fouls	20

Starters:			Pts	Reb	Ast
PG	54	Alessandro Pajola	4	2	0
SG	7	Stefano Tonut	20	3	6
SF	19	Raphael Gaspardo	5	0	1
PF	45	Nicola Akele	7	6	0
C	16	Amedeo Tessitori	19	6	2
Reserves:					
PG	4	Leonardo Candi	10	1	0
SG	12	Diego Flaccadori	5	0	7
PG	18	Matteo Spagnolo	0	0	0
SG	22	Giordano Bortolani	DNP		
C	34	Mouhamed Diouf	2	1	0
SF	44	Davide Alviti	6	1	0
PF	52	Alessandro Lever	0	1	0
Head coach:
(Italy) Romeo Sacchetti

==== vs Netherland ====
29 November 2021 2	Italy	75–73	Netherlands	Assago (Milan), Italy
20:30 (GMT+1)	Scoring by quarter: 22-18, 25-21, 13-11, 15-23
Livebasketball.tv	Pts: Akele 18; Rebs: Akele 6 Asts: Tonut 6 PIR: Akele 18	Boxscore	Pts: Hammink 19; Rebs: de Jong 6 Asts: van der Vuurst de Vries 8 PIR: Hammink 21	Arena: Mediolanum Forum; Referees: Tomas Jasevicius (LTU), Martic Vulic (HRV), Erez Gurion (ISR)

Starters:			Pts	Reb	Ast
PG	54	Alessandro Pajola	7	3	3
SG	31	Michele Vitali	7	2	3
SG	7	Stefano Tonut	13	4	6
PF	45	Nicola Akele	18	6	0
C	16	Amedeo Tessitori	13	4	2
Reserves:					
PG	4	Leonardo Candi	0	0	0
SG	12	Diego Flaccadori	6	3	4
SF	44	Davide Alviti	0	0	1
C	34	Mouhamed Diouf	4	1	0
SF	19	Raphael Gaspardo	2	1	0
PG	14	Bruno Mascolo	DNP		
SG	22	Mattia Udom	5	4	0
Head coach:
(Italy) Romeo Sacchetti

Italy	Netherlands

Italy	Statistics	Netherlands
19/39 (48.7%)	2-pt field goals	16/31 (51.6%)
8/23 (34.8%)	3-pt field goals	11/25 (44.0%)
13/15 (86.7%)	Free throws	8/10 (80.0%)
11	Offensive rebounds	6
22	Defensive rebounds	23
33	Total rebounds	29
19	Assists	16
16	Turnovers	18
8	Steals	7
0	Blocks	2
20	Fouls	20

Starters:			Pts	Reb	Ast
PG	5	Leon Williams	3	1	0
SG	90	Charlon Kloof	11	3	2
SF	6	Worthy de Jong	14	6	2
PF	9	Mohamed Kherrazi	2	2	0
C	33	Jito Kok	0	1	1
Reserves:					
SG	0	Yannick Franke	6	2	1
PG	1	Keye van der Vuurst de Vries	4	2	8
C	2	Joey van Zegeren	2	1	0
SG	3	Boy van Vliet	DNP		
SF	11	Shane Hammink	19	3	0
PF	13	Roeland Schaftenaar	9	2	2
PF	30	Olaf Schaftenaar	3	0	0
Head coach:
(Italy) Maurizio Buscaglia

== See also ==
- 2023 FIBA Basketball World Cup qualification (Europe)
- 2023 FIBA Basketball World Cup qualification
- 2023 FIBA Basketball World Cup
- Serbia at the 2023 FIBA Basketball World Cup qualification
