= 2020 Italy men's OQT basketball team =

Italy
2021 season
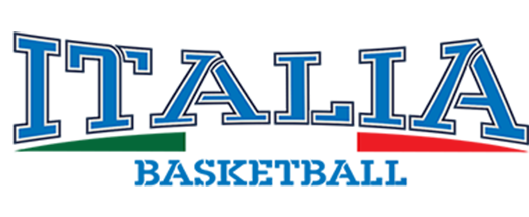
- President: Gianni Petrucci
- Head coach: Meo Sacchetti
- Preliminary round: 1st
- Playoffs: Winners
- PIR leader: Polonara 25.3
- Scoring leader: Fontecchio 19.7
- Rebounding leader: Polonara 9.3
- Assists leader: Mannion 4
- Biggest win: +20; 59-79 vs Dominican Republic (3 July)
Home	Away
- All statistics correct as of July 4, 2021.

The 2020 Italy men's OQT basketball team represented Italy at the 2020 FIBA Men's Olympic Qualifying Tournament in Belgrade, Serbia in June 2021. They qualified for the Qualification tournament by taking 10th place at the 2019 FIBA Basketball World Cup. The team has been coached by Meo Sacchetti.

== Overview ==
The tournament was originally scheduled to take place from 23 to 28 June 2020, but it was shifted to 29 June to 4 July due to the COVID-19 pandemic. Italy won the competition after a historic victory in the finals against the favourite Serbian team. This way, the Italian team qualified to the 2020 Summer Olympics in Tokyo.

== Timeline ==
- 23–28 June 2020: Original Olympic Qualifying Tournament schedule
- 13 June 2021: Coach Romeo Sacchetti calls 16 players for the tournament.
- 29 June–4 July 2021: Rescheduled Olympic Qualifying Tournament
- 28 June 2021: Coach Romeo Sacchetti calls the 12 players for the tournament.
- 30 June 2021: Italy wins by forfeit against Senegal due to COVID detected in the African team. Italy is, therefore, automatically qualified to the next stage.
- 1 July 2021: Italy wins over Puerto Rico 90–83 and ends the round at the first place.
- 3 July 2021: Italy wins over Dominican Republic 79–59 and goes to the Final against Serbia.
- 4 July 2021: Italy wins over Serbia 102–95 and qualifies to the 2020 Summer Olympics.

== Kit ==
Supplier: Spalding / Sponsor: Barilla

Home	Away

== Roster ==
The following 12 players were called by coach Romeo Sacchetti for the Olympic Qualifying Tournaments.

Italy national basketball team – 2020 FIBA Olympic Qualifying Tournaments roster
Players
Coaches

Pos.	No.	Name	Age – Date of birth	Height	Club	Ctr.
PG	0	Marco Spissu	24 – 5 February 1995	1.84 m (6 ft 0 in)	Dinamo Sassari	(Italy)
PG	1	Nico Mannion	19 – 4 September 2001	1.88 m (6 ft 2 in)	Golden State Warriors	(United States)
SG	7	Stefano Tonut	27 – 7 November 1993	1.94 m (6 ft 4 in)	Reyer Venezia	(Italy)
C	9	Nicolò Melli (C)	30 – 26 January 1991	2.06 m (6 ft 9 in)	Dallas Mavericks	(United States)
SF	13	Simone Fontecchio	25 – 9 December 1995	2.03 m (6 ft 8 in)	Alba Berlin	(Germany)
C	16	Amedeo Tessitori	26 – 7 October 1994	2.08 m (6 ft 10 in)	Virtus Bologna	(Italy)
PF	17	Giampaolo Ricci	29 – 27 September 1991	2.02 m (6 ft 8 in)	Virtus Bologna	(Italy)
SF	23	Awudu Abass	28 – 27 January 1993	1.98 m (6 ft 6 in)	Virtus Bologna	(Italy)
SF	24	Riccardo Moraschini	30 – 8 January 1991	1.94 m (6 ft 4 in)	Olimpia Milano	(Italy)
SG	31	Michele Vitali	29 – 31 October 1991	1.96 m (6 ft 5 in)	Brose Bamberg	(Germany)
PF	33	Achille Polonara	29 – 23 November 1991	2.05 m (6 ft 9 in)	Saski Baskonia	(Spain)
PG	54	Alessandro Pajola	21 – 9 November 1999	1.94 m (6 ft 4 in)	Virtus Bologna	(Italy)

Head coach

- (Italy) Romeo Sacchetti

Assistant coach(es)

- (Italy) Emanuele Molin
- (Italy) Piero Bucchi
- (Italy) Paolo Galbiati
- (Italy) Riccardo Fois

Legend

- (C) Team captain
- Club – describes last
  club before the competition
- Age – describes age
  on 31 June 2021

=== Depth chart ===
Pos.	Starting 5	Bench 1	Bench 2
C	Nicolò Melli	Amedeo Tessitori
PF	Achille Polonara	Giampaolo Ricci
SF	Simone Fontecchio	Riccardo Moraschini	Awudu Abass
SG	Stefano Tonut	Michele Vitali
PG	Nico Mannion	Alessandro Pajola	Marco Spissu

=== Candidate players ===
The following were candidates to make the team:

Earlier candidates
Player	Team	Added	Removed	Reason
Leonardo Totè	(Spain) Bilbao Basket	24 May 2021	8 June 2021	Injured
Abramo Canka	(Lithuania) BC Nevėžis	24 May 2021	13 June 2021	Technical choice
Maximilian Ladurner	(Italy) Aquila Trento	24 May 2021	13 June 2021	Technical choice
Andrea Pecchia	(Italy) Pallacanestro Cantù	24 May 2021	13 June 2021	Technical choice
Gabriele Procida	(Italy) Pallacanestro Cantù	24 May 2021	13 June 2021	Technical choice
Tomas Woldetensae	(United States) Virginia Cavaliers	24 May 2021	13 June 2021	Technical choice
Davide Alviti	(Italy) Pallacanestro Trieste	24 May 2021	16 June 2021	Technical choice
Giordano Bortolani	(Italy) Pallacanestro Brescia	24 May 2021	20 June 2021	Technical choice
Guglielmo Caruso	(United States) Santa Clara Broncos	24 May 2021	20 June 2021	Technical choice
Simone Zanotti	(Italy) VL Pesaro	24 May 2021	20 June 2021	Technical choice
Raphael Gaspardo	(Italy) New Basket Brindisi	13 June 2021	20 June 2021	Technical choice
Leonardo Candi	(Italy) Reggio Emilia	24 May 2021	24 June 2021	14-men roster cut
Matteo Spagnolo	(Spain) Madrid Baloncesto	24 May 2021	24 June 2021	14-men roster cut
Nicola Akele	(Italy) Universo Treviso	24 May 2021	24 June 2021	14-men roster cut
Michele Ruzzier	(Italy) Pallacanestro Varese	24 May 2021	28 June 2021	12-men roster cut
Mouhamet Diouf	(Italy) Reggio Emilia	24 May 2021	28 June 2021	12-men roster cut

== Staff ==
After the EuroBasket 2022 qualification tournament the staff team was updated: Piero Bucchi, Paolo Galbiati and Riccardo Fois were hired as assistant coaches and replaced Massimo Maffezzoli and Paolo Conti. Only Emanuele Molin was confirmed amongst the assistant coaches.

Position	Staff member	Age	Team
Head coach	Meo Sacchetti	71	Italian Basketball Federation
Assistant coaches	Emanuele Molin	65	Aquila Trento
Assistant coaches	Piero Bucchi	67	Pallacanestro Cantù
Assistant coaches	Paolo Galbiati	41	Vanoli Cremona
Assistant coaches	Riccardo Fois	38	Phoenix Suns
Physical trainer	Matteo Panichi	52	Italian Basketball Federation
Physician	Sandro Senzameno	72	Italian Basketball Federation
Orthopaedic	Raffaele Cortina	64	Italian Basketball Federation
Osteopath	Roberto Oggioni	50	Italian Basketball Federation
Osteopath	Francesco Ciallella	44	Italian Basketball Federation
Team manager	Massimo Valle	58	Italian Basketball Federation
Press officer	Francesco D'Aniello	44	Italian Basketball Federation
Manager	Roberto Brunamonti	65	Italian Basketball Federation
Video maker	Marco Cremonini	36	Italian Basketball Federation
Equipment manager	Curzio Garofoli	54	Italian Basketball Federation
Equipment manager	Andrea Annessa	51	Italian Basketball Federation

== Exhibition games ==
=== VTG Supercup ===
Pos	Team	Pld	Pts
1	Germany	3	3
2	Italy	3	2
3	Czech Republic	3	1
4	Tunisia	3	0

Source: FIP

18 June 2021 1	Italy	82–56	Tunisia	Hamburg
17:00 (CET)	Scoring by quarter: 21-9, 24-12, 13-11, 24-24
Eurosport	Pts: Polonara 15; Rebs: Polonara 7 Asts: Candi, Ruzzier 4	Boxscore	Pts: Marnaoui 18; Rebs: Addami 10; Asts: Haddad, Marnaoui, El Mabrouk 4	Arena: Edel-optics.de Arena; Referees: Carsten Straube (DEU), Steve Bittner (DEU), Boris Krejic (SVN)

19 June 2021 2	Italy	83–71	Czech Republic	Hamburg
17:00 (CET)	Scoring by quarter: 22-22, 27-13, 20-11, 25-14
Eurosport	Pts: Tonut, Polonara 15; Rebs: Polonara 7 Asts: Tonut 4	Boxscore	Pts: Kovář 18; Rebs: Balvín 5 Asts: Sehnal 9	Arena: Edel-optics.de Arena; Referees: Steve Bittner (DEU), Carsten Straube (DEU), Tomas Jasevičius (LTU)

20 June 2021 3	Germany	91–79	Italy	Hamburg
20:30 (CET)	Scoring by quarter: 22-20, 20-28, 29-12, 20-21
Eurosport	Pts: Saibou 18; Rebs: Voigtmann 9 Asts: Voigtmann 7	Boxscore	Pts: Melli 21; Rebs: Polonara 9 Asts: Ruzzier 6	Arena: Edel-optics.de Arena; Referees: Boris Krejic (SVN), Manuel Attard (Ita), Carsten Straube (DEU)

== Tournament ==
=== Preliminary round ===
==== Senegal v Italy ====
The Senegal roster did not participate in the Qualifying Tournament. On June 28, they informed FIBA about COVID-19 related disruptions to their preparations in Germany. Afterwards, their scheduled games did not take place and Senegal lost by forfeit 0–20.

1	Senegal	0–20	Italy
		Boxscore

==== Italy v Puerto Rico ====
1 July 2021 2	Italy	90–83	Puerto Rico	Belgrade
16:30 (CET)	Scoring by quarter: 18–24, 19–20, 27–14, 26–25
Rai Sport, Sky	Pts: Mannion, Fontecchio, Polonara 21; Rebs: Polonara 11; Asts: Mannion 6 PIR: Polonara 30	Boxscore	Pts: Clavell 24; Rebs: Browne 9 Asts: Browne 16; PIR: Browne 31	Arena: Aleksandar Nikolić Hall; Referees: Yohan Rosso (FRA), Omar Bermúdez (MEX), Yener Yılmaz (TUR)

Starters:			Pts	Reb	Ast
PG	0	Marco Spissu	3	2	3
SG	7	Stefano Tonut	9	1	0
SF	13	Simone Fontecchio	21	6	2
PF	33	Achille Polonara	21	11	2
C	9	Nicolò Melli	0	3	3
Reserves:					
PG	1	Nico Mannion	21	3	6
C	16	Amedeo Tessitori	4	2	0
PF	17	Giampaolo Ricci	6	3	1
SF	23	Awudu Abass	2	2	0
SF	24	Riccardo Moraschini	DNP		
SG	31	Michele Vitali	3	1	0
PG	54	Alessandro Pajola	0	1	0
Head coach:
(Italy) Romeo Sacchetti

Italy	Puerto Rico

ITA	Statistics	PUR
15/26 (57.7%)	2-pt field goals	21/45 (46.7%)
14/37 (37.8%)	3-pt field goals	11/27 (40.7%)
18/25 (72%)	Free throws	8/18 (44.4%)
9	Offensive rebounds	14
29	Defensive rebounds	27
38	Total rebounds	41
17	Assists	19
13	Turnovers	17
1	Steals	7
4	Blocks	2
19	Fouls	26

Starters:			Pts	Reb	Ast
PG	9	Gary Browne	16	9	16
SG	24	Gian Clavell	24	4	0
SF	0	Isaiah Piñeiro	8	4	0
PF	15	Timajh Parker-Rivera	0	4	0
C	1	George Conditt	9	4	0
Reserves:					
PG	10	Iván Gandía	3	1	3
C	12	Jorge Díaz	2	0	0
SG	22	Emmanuel Andujar	11	4	0
SG	23	Isaac Sosa	3	0	0
PF	32	Chris Ortiz	7	6	0
PF	34	Arnaldo Toro	DNP		
SF	41	Gilberto Clavell	0	0	0
Head coach:
(Puerto Rico) Eddie Casiano

=== Final round ===
==== Italy v Dominican Republic ====
3 July 2021 Semifinal	Italy	79–59	Dominican Republic	Belgrade
13:00 (CET)	Scoring by quarter: 22-14, 20-16, 24-8, 13-21
Rai Sport, Sky	Pts: Fontecchio 17; Rebs: Melli, Fontecchio, Polonara 5 Asts: four players 3 PIR: Fontecchio 20	Boxscore	Pts: Francis 12; Rebs: Santos 7 Asts: Mendoza, Solano 4 PIR: Francis 13	Arena: Aleksandar Nikolić Hall; Referees: Guilherme Locatelli (BRA), Martins Kozlovskis (LVA), Georgios Poursanidis (GRC)

Starters:			Pts	Reb	Ast
PG	0	Marco Spissu	3	4	2
SG	7	Stefano Tonut	14	1	3
SF	13	Simone Fontecchio	17	5	3
PF	33	Achille Polonara	9	5	0
C	9	Nicolò Melli	5	5	3
Reserves:					
PG	1	Nico Mannion	8	2	2
C	16	Amedeo Tessitori	2	3	2
PF	17	Giampaolo Ricci	2	2	0
SF	23	Awudu Abass	3	0	0
SF	24	Riccardo Moraschini	2	3	3
SG	31	Michele Vitali	8	3	2
PG	54	Alessandro Pajola	6	2	1
Head coach:
(Italy) Romeo Sacchetti

Italy	Dominican Republic

ITA	Statistics	PUR
13/33 (39.4%)	2-pt field goals	14/34 (41.2%)
13/25 (52.0%)	3-pt field goals	5/30 (16.7%)
14/19 (73.7%)	Free throws	16/16 (100%)
7	Offensive rebounds	12
31	Defensive rebounds	26
38	Total rebounds	38
21	Assists	14
15	Turnovers	14
6	Steals	10
5	Blocks	0
17	Fouls	23

Starters:			Pts	Reb	Ast
PG	4	Gelvis Solano	6	0	4
SG	5	Víctor Liz	4	1	1
SF	7	Sadiel Rojas	2	6	1
PF	13	Angel Nunez	0	5	0
C	30	Jhonatan Araujo	4	5	0
Reserves:					
SG	1	Brandone Francis	12	3	1
SG	2	Rigoberto Mendoza	4	3	4
SG	3	Adonys Henriquez	10	0	0
PG	10	Andrés Feliz	4	2	1
PF	15	Brayan Martinez	3	1	0
PG	33	Mike Torres	6	0	2
C	40	Luis Santos	4	7	0
Head coach:
(Dominican Republic) Melvyn Lopez

==== Serbia v Italy ====
4 July 2021 Final	Serbia	95–102	Italy	Belgrade
20:30 (CET)	Scoring by quarter: 22-28, 23-29, 18-23, 32-22
Rai Sport, Sky	Pts: Anđušić 27; Rebs: Kalinić 6 Asts: Teodosić, Kalinić 5 PIR: Petrušev 29	Boxscore	Pts: Mannion 24; Rebs: Polonara 12; Asts: Pajola 6 PIR: Polonara 32	Arena: Aleksandar Nikolić Hall; Referees: Guilherme Locatelli (BRA), Yohan Rosso (FRA), Martins Kozlovskis (LVA)

Starters:			Pts	Reb	Ast
PG	30	Aleksa Avramović	2	5	3
SG	31	Ognjen Dobrić	17	3	4
SF	33	Danilo Anđušić	27	2	3
PF	8	Nemanja Bjelica	5	4	0
C	51	Boban Marjanović	7	3	0
Reserves:					
C	3	Filip Petrušev	22	5	1
PG	4	Miloš Teodosić	5	3	5
SF	10	Nikola Kalinić	2	6	5
SG	12	Dragan Milosavljević	DNP		
PG	22	Vasilije Micić	8	0	2
PG	24	Stefan Jović	DNP		
PF	27	Dejan Davidovac	DNP		
Head coach:
(Serbia) Igor Kokoškov

Serbia	Italy

SRB	Statistics	ITA
18/27 (66.7%)	2-pt field goals	20/42 (47.6%)
11/32 (34.4%)	3-pt field goals	14/34 (41.2%)
26/32 (81.2%)	Free throws	20/23 (87.0%)
9	Offensive rebounds	15
27	Defensive rebounds	24
36	Total rebounds	38
23	Assists	17
11	Turnovers	8
5	Steals	7
5	Blocks	2
24	Fouls	24

Starters:			Pts	Reb	Ast
PG	1	Nico Mannion	24	0	4
SG	7	Stefano Tonut	15	4	4
SF	13	Simone Fontecchio	21	8	0
PF	33	Achille Polonara	22	12	2
C	9	Nicolò Melli	5	4	0
Reserves:					
PG	0	Marco Spissu	DNP		
C	16	Amedeo Tessitori	2	2	1
PF	17	Giampaolo Ricci	3	0	0
SF	23	Awudu Abass	DNP		
SF	24	Riccardo Moraschini	0	0	0
SG	31	Michele Vitali	0	0	0
PG	54	Alessandro Pajola	10	4	6
Head coach:
(Italy) Romeo Sacchetti

== Statistics ==
=== Individual statistics ===
No.	Player	GC	GP	GS	MPG	2FG%	3FG%	FT%	RPG	APG	SPG	BPG	EF	PPG
0	Marco Spissu	3	2	2	17.5	50.0% (0.5/1.0)	16.7% (0.5/3.0)	33.3% (0.5/1.5)	3.0	2.5	0.0	0.5	3.5	3.0
1	Nico Mannion	3	3	1	21.7	50.0% (3.3/6.7)	45.5% (1.7/3.7)	78.3% (6.0/7.7)	1.7	4.0	0.0	0.0	14.7	17.7
7	Stefano Tonut	3	3	3	26.3	43.8% (2.3/5.3)	46.2% (2.0/4.3)	75.0% (2.0/2.7)	2.0	2.3	0.3	0.0	10.0	12.7
9	Nicolò Melli	3	3	3	21.3	18.2% (0.7/3.7)	20.0% (0.7/3.3)	0.0% (0.0/0.7)	4.0	2.0	1.3	0.7	3.7	3.3
13	Simone Fontecchio	3	3	3	29.7	57.7% (5.0/8.7)	53.8% (2.3/4.3)	100.0% (2.7/2.7)	6.3	1.7	0.0	1.0	22.0	19.7
16	Amedeo Tessitori	3	3	0	8.7	40.0% (0.7/1.7)	0.0% (0.0/0.3)	100.0% (1.3/1.3)	2.3	1.0	0.3	0.0	4.3	2.7
17	Giampaolo Ricci	3	3	0	14.0	25.0% (0.3/1.3)	27.3% (1.0/3.7)	-	1.7	0.3	1.0	0.3	2.7	3.7
23	Awudu Abass	3	2	0	7.5	50.0% (0.5/1.0)	0.0% (0.0/1.0)	75.0% (1.5/2.0)	1.0	0.0	0.0	0.0	1.5	2.5
24	Riccardo Moraschini	3	2	0	11.0	0.0% (0.0/0.5)	-	100.0% (1.0/1.0)	1.5	1.5	0.0	0.0	3.0	1.0
31	Michele Vitali	3	3	0	13.3	33.3% (0.3/1.0)	33.3% (0.7/2.0)	75.0% (1.0/1.3)	1.3	0.7	0.3	0.3	2.7	3.7
33	Achille Polonara	3	3	3	29.0	87.5% (2.3/2.7)	61.1% (3.7/6.0)	71.4% (1.7/2.3)	9.3	1.3	1.0	0.7	25.3	17.3
54	Alessandro Pajola	3	3	0	11.7	33.3% (0.3/1.0)	80.0% (1.3/1.7)	100.0% (0.7/0.7)	2.3	2.3	0.3	0.3	9.0	5.3
Total		3				47.5%	42.7%	77.6%	38.3	18.3	4.7	3.7	99.7	90.3

=== Individual game highs ===
	Total	Player	Opponent
Points	24	Nico Mannion	vs Serbia
Total Rebounds	9	Achille Polonara	vs Serbia
Assists	6	Nico Mannion	vs Puerto Rico
Assists	6	Alessandro Pajola	vs Serbia
Steals	3	Nicolò Melli	vs Dominican Republic
Efficiency	32	Achille Polonara	vs Serbia
2-point field goal percentage^{5}	71.4% (5/7)	Simone Fontecchio	vs Puerto Rico
3-point field goal percentage	100% (3/3)	Simone Fontecchio	vs Puerto Rico
Free throw percentage	100% (9/9)	Nico Mannion	vs Serbia
Minutes	35:28	Achille Polonara	vs Puerto Rico

Notes

- ^5 at least 5 attempts

	Total	Player	Opponent
2-point field goals made	7	Simone Fontecchio	vs Serbia
2-point field goals attempted	12	Nico Mannion	vs Serbia
2-point field goals attempted	12	Simone Fontecchio	vs Serbia
3-point field goals made	6	Achille Polonara	vs Serbia
3-point field goals attempted	9	Achille Polonara	vs Puerto Rico
Free throws made	9	Nico Mannion	vs Serbia
Free throws attempted	9	Nico Mannion	vs Serbia
Offensive Rebounds	3	Simone Fontecchio	vs Serbia
Offensive Rebounds	3	Achille Polonara	vs Serbia
Defensive Rebounds	9	Achille Polonara	vs Puerto Rico
Defensive Rebounds	9	Achille Polonara	vs Serbia

=== Team game highs ===
Statistic	Total	Opponent
Points	102	vs Serbia
Total Rebounds	39	vs Serbia
Assists	21	vs Dominican Republic
Blocks	5	vs Dominican Republic
Steals	7	vs Serbia
Efficiency	110	vs Serbia
2-point field goal percentage	57.7%	vs Puerto Rico
3-point field goal percentage	52.0%	vs Dominican Republic
Free throw percentage	87.0%	vs Serbia
Turnovers	8	vs Serbia

Statistic	Total	Opponent
2-point field goals made	20	vs Serbia
2-point field goals attempted	42	vs Serbia
3-point field goals made	14	vs Serbia
3-point field goals attempted	37	vs Dominican Republic
Free throws made	20	vs Serbia
Free throws attempted	25	vs Dominican Republic
Offensive Rebounds	15	vs Serbia
Defensive Rebounds	31	vs Dominican Republic
