= 2021–22 Universo Treviso Basket season =

Italian basketball season

Universo Treviso Basket
2021–22 season
- Owner: Consorzio Universo Treviso
- President: Paolo Vazzoler
- Head coach: Massimiliano Menetti
- Arena: Palaverde
- LBA: Regular season
- BCL: Regular season
- Supercup: Quarterfinals

The 2020–21 season is Universo Treviso Basket's 10th in existence (6th after the re-foundation) and the club's 3rd consecutive season in the top tier Italian basketball.

== Kit ==
Supplier: Erreà / Sponsor: NutriBullet

== Players ==
=== Current roster ===
NutriBullet Treviso roster
Players
Coaches

Pos.	No.	Nat.	Name	Ht.	Wt.	Age
SG	2	(Estonia)	Jurkatamm, Mikk	1.95 m (6 ft 5 in)	81 kg (179 lb)	26 – 18 September 2000
PG	4	(United States)	Russell, DeWayne	1.80 m (5 ft 11 in)	70 kg (154 lb)	32 – 10 February 1994
SG	8	(Italy)	Bortolani, Giordano	1.93 m (6 ft 4 in)	85 kg (187 lb)	25 – 2 December 2000
PG	12	(Italy)	Imbrò, Matteo (C)	1.92 m (6 ft 4 in)	86 kg (190 lb)	32 – 12 February 1994
F/C	15	(Italy)	Chillo, Matteo	2.03 m (6 ft 8 in)	104 kg (229 lb)	33 – 15 June 1993
C	21	(United States)	Sims, Henry	2.08 m (6 ft 10 in)	112 kg (247 lb)	36 – 27 March 1990
SF	24	(Poland)	Sokołowski, Michał	1.96 m (6 ft 5 in)	89 kg (196 lb)	33 – 11 December 1992
SG	33	(Lithuania)	Dimša, Tomas	1.96 m (6 ft 5 in)	82 kg (181 lb)	32 – 2 February 1994
PF	34	(United States)	Jones, Aaron	2.06 m (6 ft 9 in)	107 kg (236 lb)	33 – 26 July 1993
F	45	(Italy)	Akele, Nicola	2.03 m (6 ft 8 in)	96 kg (212 lb)	28 – 7 November 1997

Head coach

- (Argentina) Marcelo Nicola

Assistant coach(es)

- (Italy) Francesco Tabellini
- (Italy) Lorenzo Pomes

Legend

- (C) Team captain
- Injured

- Roster
Updated: February 9, 2022

Note: Flags indicate national team eligibility at FIBA-sanctioned events. Players may hold other non-FIBA nationalities not displayed.

=== Depth chart ===
Pos.	Starting 5	Bench
C	Henry Sims	Matteo Chillo
PF	Aaron Jones	Nicola Akele
SF	Michał Sokołowski	Giordano Bortolani
SG	Tomas Dimša	Mikk Jurkatamm
PG	DeWayne Russell	Matteo Imbrò

(colours: Italian or homegrown players; foreign players; young players)

=== Squad changes ===
==== In ====
No.	Pos.	Nat.	Name	Age	Moving from		Type	Ends	Transfer fee	Date	Source
24	SF	(Poland)	Michał Sokołowski	28	Hapoel Holon	(Israel)	2 year	June 2023	Free	15 June 2021	
14	SG	(Italy)	Davide Casarin	18	Reyer Venezia	(Italy)	2 years loan	June 2023	Undisclosed	2 July 2021	
34	PF	(United States)	Aaron Jones	27	Cholet Basket	(France)	1 year	June 2022	Free	5 July 2021	
8	SG	(Italy)	Giordano Bortolani	20	Brescia	(Italy)	1 year loan from Milano	June 2022	Undisclosed	8 July 2021	
21	C	(United States)	Henry Sims	31	Reggio Emilia	(Italy)	1 year	June 2022	Free	23 July 2021	
33	SG	(Lithuania)	Tomas Dimša	27	Gran Canaria	(Spain)	1 year lona from Žalgiris	June 2022	Free	27 July 2021	
2	SG	(Estonia) (Italy)	Mikk Jurkatamm	21	TalTech Basketball	(Estonia)	End of the season	June 2022	Undisclosed	12 January 2022	

==== Out ====
No.	Pos.	Nat.	Name	Age	Moving to		Type	Transfer fee	Date	Source
24	SF	(Poland)	Michał Sokołowski	28	Hapoel Holon	(Israel)	End of contract	Free	20 May 2021	
1	SG	(Poland) (United States)	David Logan	38	Dinamo Sassari	(Italy)	End of contract	Free	1 July 2021	
8	F/C	(Italy)	Giovanni Vildera	26	Kleb Ferrara	(Italy)	End of contract	Free	1 July 2021	
21	C	(Nigeria)	Christian Mekowulu	26	Dinamo Sassari	(Italy)	End of contract	Free	1 July 2021	
52	G/F	(United States)	Trent Lockett	30	Niners Chemnitz	(Germany)	End of contract	Free	1 July 2021	

==== Confirmed ====
No.	Pos.	Nat.	Name	Age	Moving from		Type	Ends	Transfer fee	Date	Source
12	PG	(Italy)	Matteo Imbrò	27	Basket Ferentino	(Italy)	4 + 1 years	June 2022	Free	30 June 2017	
15	F/C	(Italy)	Matteo Chillo	28	Fortitudo Bologna	(Italy)	3 + 1 years	June 2022	Free	30 July 2018	
45	PF	(Italy)	Nicola Akele	24	Vanoli Cremona	(Italy)	1 + 1 years	June 2022	Undisclosed	26 June 2020	
4	PG	(United States)	DeWayne Russell	26	Crailsheim Merlins	(Germany)	1 + 1 years	June 2022	Free	30 June 2020	
24	SF	(Poland)	Michał Sokołowski	28	Legia Warszawa	(Poland)	1 + 2 years	June 2023	Undisclosed	16 October 2020	

1. In players: Sokołowski at played for Hapoel Holon at the end of the 2020–21 season

==== Coach ====
Nat.	Name	Age.	Previous team		Type	Ends	Date	Source
(Italy)	Massimiliano Menetti	48	Reggio Emilia	(Italy)	3 + 3 years	June 2023	7 June 2018	

== Competitions ==
=== Supercup ===
==== Group stage ====
Pos	Team	Pld	W	L	PF	PA	PD	Qualification
1	NutriBullet Treviso Basket	4	4	0	323	296	+27	Advance to Final Eight
2	Gevi Napoli	4	1	3	293	307	−14	
3	Germani Brescia	4	1	3	322	335	−13	

Source: LegaBasket Serie A
Rules for classification: All points scored in extra period(s) were not counted in the standings, nor for any tie-break situation.

==== Playoffs ====
18 September 2021 Quarterfinals	AX Armani Exchange Milano	108–60	NutriBullet Treviso Basket	Casalecchio di Reno, Bologna
18:00 (CEST)	Scoring by quarter: 36–20, 33–14, 17–13, 22–13
Discovery+, Eurosport, DMAX	Pts: Alviti 18; Rebs: Mitoglou 10; Asts: Delaney 4 PIR: Mitoglou 31	Boxscore	Pts: Bortolani 16; Rebs: Poser 5 Asts: Jones 3 PIR: Bortolani 10	Arena: Unipol Arena; Referees: Tolga Sahin, Guido Giovannetti, Fabrizio Paglialunga

=== Serie A ===
Pos	Team	Pld	W	L	PF	PA	PD	Pts	Qualification
8	Carpegna Prosciutto Pesaro	30	14	16	2408	2518	−110	28	Qualification to Playoffs
9	Allianz Pallacanestro Trieste	30	14	16	2390	2464	−74	28	
10	NutriBullet Treviso	30	12	18	2366	2509	−143	24	
11	Happy Casa Brindisi	30	12	18	2440	2499	−59	24	
12	Openjobmetis Varese	30	12	18	2470	2655	−185	24	

Source: LBA

=== Basketball Champion League ===
==== Qualifiers ====
13 September 2021 Quarterfinals	London Lions (United Kingdom)	62–89	(Italy) NutriBullet Treviso	Villorba (Treviso)
20:30 (CET)	Scoring by quarter: 12-23, 15-19, 19-22, 16-25
YouTube	Pts: Cugini 19; Rebs: Tawiah 10; Asts: Reese 4 PIR: Cugini 19	Boxscore	Pts: Sims 16; Rebs: Jones, Akele 7 Asts: Russell 5 PIR: Sims 19	Arena: Palaverde; Attendance: 903; Referees: Yohan Rosso, Alexandre Deman, Blaz Zupancic

15 September 2021 Semifinals	Bakken Bears (Denmark)	90–92	(Italy) NutriBullet Treviso	Villorba (Treviso)
20:30 (CET)	Scoring by quarter: 24-19, 23-19, 12-29, 31-25
YouTube	Pts: Bartley 19; Rebs: Evans 13; Asts: Ogungbemi-Jackson 3 PIR: Evans 21	Boxscore	Pts: Sims 23; Rebs: Sims 13; Asts: Russell 4 PIR: Sims 36	Arena: Palaverde; Attendance: 911; Referees: Paulo Marques, Radomir Vojinovic, Michal Proc

17 September 2021 Final	NutriBullet Treviso (Italy)	95–78	(Belarus) Tsmoki-Minsk	Villorba (Treviso)
20:30 (CET)	Scoring by quarter: 30-21, 25-19, 25-13, 15-25
YouTube	Pts: Dimša 26; Rebs: Sims 9 Asts: Russell, Akele 4 PIR: Dimša 28	Boxscore	Pts: Warner 25; Rebs: Warner 9 Asts: Warner 8 PIR: Warner 34	Arena: Palaverde; Attendance: 1,671; Referees: Yohan Rosso, Radomir Vojinovic, Michal Proc

==== Regular season ====
Pos	Team	Pld	W	L	PF	PA	PD	Pts	Qualification
1	(Hungary) Falco Szombathely	6	5	1	461	442	+19	11	Advance to round of 16
2	(Italy) NutriBullet Treviso	6	4	2	483	446	+37	10	Advance to play-ins
3	(Latvia) VEF Rīga	6	2	4	463	474	−11	8	Advance to play-ins
4	(Greece) AEK	6	1	5	471	516	−45	7	

Source: Groups Standings
