= 2020–21 Pallacanestro Reggiana season =

Pallacanestro Reggiana
2020-21 season
- Owner: Stefano Landi; Veronica Bartoli; Enrico San Pietro; Graziano Sassi; Andrea Baroni
- President: Maria Licia Ferrarini
- Head coach: Attilio Caja
- Arena: PalaBigi
- LBA: 11th of 15
- Europe Cup: Quarterfinals
- Italian Cup: Quarter finals
- Supercup: Group stage (2nd of 4)

The 2020–21 season is Reggio Emilia's 47th in existence and the club's 10th consecutive season in the top tier Italian basketball.

== Kit ==
Supplier: Adidas / Sponsor: UNAHOTELS

Home	Away

== Players ==
=== Current roster ===
UNAHOTELS Reggio Emilia roster
Players
Coaches

Pos.	No.	Nat.	Name	Ht.	Wt.	Age
SG	0	(United States)	Lemar, Brynton	1.93 m (6 ft 4 in)	88 kg (194 lb)	31 – 23 January 1995
SG	3	(Finland)	Koponen, Petteri	1.94 m (6 ft 4 in)	88 kg (194 lb)	38 – 13 April 1988
PG	7	(Italy)	Candi, Leonardo (C)	1.90 m (6 ft 3 in)	86 kg (190 lb)	29 – 30 March 1997
PF	8	(Italy)	Baldi Rossi, Filippo	2.07 m (6 ft 9 in)	97 kg (214 lb)	34 – 26 October 1991
G	9	(Italy)	Porfilio, Carlo	1.95 m (6 ft 5 in)		25 – 9 April 2001
PG	11	(United States)	Taylor, Brandon	1.78 m (5 ft 10 in)	77 kg (170 lb)	32 – 8 January 1994
G	14	(Italy)	Giannini, Marco	1.90 m (6 ft 3 in)		25 – 31 August 2001
C	15	(United States Virgin Islands)	Elegar, Frank	2.08 m (6 ft 10 in)	108 kg (238 lb)	39 – 3 December 1986
C	16	(The Gambia)	Cham, Ibrahima	2.05 m (6 ft 9 in)		23 – 15 September 2003
PF	23	(United States)	Johnson, Justin	2.00 m (6 ft 7 in)	108 kg (238 lb)	30 – 23 May 1996
G	32	(Italy)	Bonacini, Federico	1.90 m (6 ft 3 in)	83 kg (183 lb)	27 – 23 January 1999
PF	35	(Italy)	Diouf, Mouhamet	2.06 m (6 ft 9 in)	105 kg (231 lb)	25 – 10 September 2001
SG	77	(Czech Republic)	Kyzlink, Tomáš	1.98 m (6 ft 6 in)	91 kg (201 lb)	33 – 18 June 1993

Head coach

- (Italy) Attilio Caja

Assistant coach(es)

- (Italy) Federico Fucà
- (Italy) Andrea Bonacina

Legend

- (C) Team captain
- Injured

- Roster
Updated: 10 May 2021

Note: Flags indicate national team eligibility at FIBA-sanctioned events. Players may hold other non-FIBA nationalities not displayed.

=== Depth chart ===
Pos.	Starting 5	Bench 1	Bench 2
C	Frank Elegar	Mouhamet Diouf	Ibrahima Cham
PF	Justin Johnson	Filippo Baldi Rossi
SF	Tomáš Kyzlink	Carlo Porfilio
SG	Brynton Lemar	Petteri Koponen	Marco Giannini
PG	Brandon Taylor	Leonardo Candi	Federico Bonacini

6+6 format (colours: Italian or homegrown players; foreign players; young players)

=== Squad changes ===
==== In ====
No.	Pos.	Nat.	Name	Age	Moving from		Type	Ends	Transfer fee	Date	Source
77	SG	(Czech Republic)	Tomáš Kyzlink	27	Virtus Roma	(Italy)	2 years (opt. out 2021)	June 2022	Free	26 June 2020	
32	G	(Italy)	Federico Bonacini	21	Pallacanestro Trapani	(Italy)	Return from loan		Free	1 July 2020	
11	F	(United States)	Brandon Taylor	25	Le Mans Sarthe	(France)	1 year	June 2021	Free	10 July 2020	
8	PF	(Italy)	Filippo Baldi Rossi	28	Virtus Bologna	(Italy)	2 years	June 2022	Undisclosed	16 July 2020	
45	G	(Latvia)	Jānis Blūms	38	VEF Rīga	(Latvia)	1 year	June 2021	Free	28 July 2020	
5	SF	(United States)	Josh Bostic	33	Arka Gdynia	(Poland)	1 year	June 2021	Free	4 August 2020	
15	C	(British Virgin Islands) (Guyana)	Frank Elegar	34	Unicaja Málaga	(Spain)	1 year	June 2021	Free	14 August 2020	
23	PF	(United States)	Justin Johnson	24	Pistoia Basket 2000	(Italy)	1 year	June 2021	Free	19 August 2020	
14	G	(Italy)	Marco Giannini	19	Polisportiva Arena Montecchio (double subscription from youth team)	(Italy)	1 year	June 2021	Free	19 August 2020	
2	SF	(United States)	Dominique Sutton	34	Al-Ahli	(Bahrain)	End of the season	June 2021	Undisclosed	8 January 2021	
3	SG	(Finland)	Petteri Koponen	32	Bayern Munich	(Germany)	End of the season	June 2021	Free	14 January 2021	
21	C	(United States)	Henry Sims	30	Incheon Electroland Elephants	(South Korea)	End of the season	June 2021	Undisclosed	14 February 2021	
0	SG	(United States) (Jamaica)	Brynton Lemar	26	Gaziantep	(Turkey)	End of the season	June 2021	Undisclosed	14 February 2021	

1. In players: Players who signed after the beginning of the season

==== Out ====
No.	Pos.	Nat.	Name	Age	Moving to		Type	Transfer fee	Date	Source
9	G/F	(Hungary)	Dávid Vojvoda	29	Alba Fehérvár	(Hungary)	Exit option	Free	21 April 2020	
30	PF	(United States)	Reggie Upshaw	25	Maccabi Haifa	(Israel)	Exit option	Free	27 May 2020	
22	C	(United States)	Josh Owens	31	Bahçeşehir	(Turkey)	End of contract	Free	30 June 2020	
2	PG	(United States)	Will Cherry	29	Free agent		End of contract	Free	1 July 2020	
3	SF	(Italy)	Simone Fontecchio	24	Alba Berlin	(Germany)	End of contract	Free	1 July 2020	
15	PG	(Italy)	Jacopo Soviero	19	Bologna Basket 2016	(Italy)	Loan contract	Undisclosed	17 July 2020	
1	G	(United States)	Darius Johnson-Odom	36	Orléans Loiret Basket	(France)	Exit option	Free	21 July 2020	
33	G	(Italy)	Alessandro Cipolla	20	Stella Azzurra Roma	(Italy)	Loan contract	Undisclosed	22 July 2020	
8	PG	(Italy)	Giuseppe Poeta	34	Vanoli Cremona	(Italy)	Transfer	Undisclosed	5 August 2020	
45	G	(Latvia)	Jānis Blūms	38	Retired		Mutual consent	Undisclosed	9 December 2020	
5	SF	(United States)	Josh Bostic	33	Happy Casa Brindisi	(Italy)	Transfer	Undisclosed	22 February 2021	
2	SF	(United States)	Dominique Sutton	34	Al-Ahli	(Bahrain)	Mutual consent	Undisclosed	26 February 2021	
21	C	(United States)	Henry Sims	31	Free agent		Mutual consent	Undisclosed	30 April 2021	

1. Out players: Players who left before the end of the season

==== Confirmed ====
No.	Pos.	Nat.	Name	Age	Moving from		Type	Ends	Transfer fee	Date	Source
7	PG	(Italy)	Leonardo Candi	23	Fortitudo Bologna	(Italy)	5 year	June 2022	Free	22 June 2017	
35	PF	(Italy)	Mouhamet Diouf	18	youth team			June 2023	Youth system	September 2019	
9	SG	(Italy)	Carlo Porfilio	19	youth team				Youth system	6 March 2020	

==== From youth team ====
No.	Pos.	Nat.	Name	Age	Transfer fee	Date
9	G	(Italy)	Carlo Porfilio	19	Youth system	September 2020
16	C	(The Gambia)	Ibrahima Cham	17	Youth system	September 2020
32	G	(Italy)	Federico Bonacini	21	Youth system	September 2020

==== Coach ====
Coach Maurizio Buscaglia was replaced by Antimo Martino but his contract was valid until he was called by Brescia for the role of head coach.

Nat.	Name	Age.	Previous team		Type	Ends	Date	Replaces		Date	Type
(Italy)	Attilio Caja	59	Pallacanestro Varese	(Italy)	End of the season + 1 year	June 2022	16 March 2021	(Italy)	Antimo Martino	15 March 2021	Sacked
(Italy)	Antimo Martino	41	Fortitudo Bologna	(Italy)	2 + 1	June 2023 (opt. out 2022)	28 May 2020	(Italy)	Maurizio Buscaglia	27 May 2020	Mutual consent

== Competitions ==
=== Supercup ===
Pos	Team	Pld	W	L	PF	PA	PD	Qualification
1	Segafredo Virtus Bologna	6	5	1	490	428	+62	Advance to Final Four
2	UnaHotels Reggio Emilia	6	3	3	479	477	+2	
3	Lavoropiù Fortitudo Bologna	6	3	3	506	496	+10	
4	Vanoli Cremona	6	1	5	408	482	−74	

Source: LegaBasket Serie A
Rules for classification: All points scored in extra period(s) were not counted in the standings, nor for any tie-break situation.

=== Italian Cup ===
Reggio Emilia qualified to the 2021 Italian Basketball Cup by ending the first half of the LBA season in the 8th position. They played the quarterfinal against the first ranking AX Armani Exchange Milan.

11 February 2021 Quarterfinals	AX Armani Exchange Milano	80–52	UNAHOTELS Reggio Emilia	Assago (Milan)
18:00 (CET)	Scoring by quarter: 19-10, 22-12, 18-9, 21-21
Rai Sport, Eurosport	Pts: Punter, LeDay 15; Rebs: Shields 9 Asts: Rodríguez 9 PIR: LeDay 20	Boxscore	Pts: Baldi Rossi 13; Rebs: Diouf 9 Asts: Baldi Rossi 5 PIR: Baldi Rossi 13	Arena: Mediolanum Forum; Referees: Roberto Begnis, Mark Bartoli, Fabrizio Paglialunga

=== Serie A ===
Pos	Team	Pld	W	L	PF	PA	PD
9	Germani Basket Brescia	28	11	17	2299	2389	−90
10	Vanoli Cremona	28	11	17	2370	2395	−25
11	UNAHOTELS Reggio Emilia	28	10	18	2122	2261	−139
12	Fortitudo Lavoropiù Bologna	28	10	18	2179	2291	−112
13	Carpegna Prosciutto Basket Pesaro	28	10	18	2271	2364	−93

Updated to match(es) played on 10 May 2021. Source: LBA

=== Fiba Europe Cup ===
==== Regular season ====
Pos	Team	Pld	W	L	PF	PA	PD	Pts	Qualification
1	(Greece) Iraklis	3	3	0	251	225	+26	6	Advance to round of 16
2	(Italy) UnaHotels Reggio Emilia	3	2	1	232	226	+6	5	Advance to round of 16
3	(Belgium) Belfius Mons-Hainaut	3	1	2	227	215	+12	4	Advance to round of 16
4	(Hungary) Egis Körmend	3	0	3	221	265	−44	3	

Source: FIBA Europe Cup

==== Playoffs ====
23 March 2021 Round of 16	CSU Sibiu (Romania)	61–65	(Italy) UNAHOTELS Reggio Emilia	Oradea, Romania
15:00 (CET)	Scoring by quarter: 15-17, 19-13, 13-17, 14-18
YouTube	Pts: Hardy 15; Rebs: Hardy 10; Asts: Rathan-Mayes 4 PIR: Hardy 28	Boxscore	Pts: Lemar 16; Rebs: Sims 8 Asts: Taylor 8 PIR: Sims 14	Arena: Arena Antonio Alexe; Referees: Anastasios Manos, Can Mavisu, Kyriacos Christou

25 March 2021 Quarterfinals	UNAHOTELS Reggio Emilia (Italy)	64–71	(Romania) CSM U Oradea	Oradea, Romania
18:00 (CET)	Scoring by quarter: 18-21, 16-16, 12-15, 18-19
YouTube	Pts: Taylor 16; Rebs: Elegar 6 Asts: Baldi Rossi 3 PIR: Elegar 18	Boxscore	Pts: Green 15; Rebs: Marković 6 Asts: Valeika 6 PIR: Green 17	Arena: Arena Antonio Alexe; Referees: Tanel Suslov, Gvidas Gedvilas, Sinsa Prpa

== See also ==
- 2020–21 LBA season
- 2020–21 FIBA Europe Cup
- 2021 Italian Basketball Cup
- 2020 Italian Basketball Supercup
