= Michał Sokołowski =

Polish basketball player (born 1992)

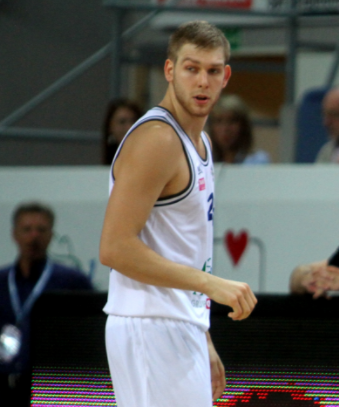
- Sokołowski in 2013

No. 24 – Çayırova Belediyespor
- Position: Small forward
- League: Basketbol Süper Ligi

Personal information
- Born: 11 December 1992 (age 33) Warsaw, Poland
- Listed height: 1.96 m (6 ft 5 in)
- Listed weight: 89 kg (196 lb)

Career information
- NBA draft: 2014: undrafted
- Playing career: 2011–present

Career history
- 2011–2014: Anwil Włocławek
- 2014–2018: Rosa Radom
- 2018–2019: Zielona Góra
- 2019–2020: Anwil Włocławek
- 2020: Legia Warszawa
- 2020–2021: Universo Treviso Basket
- 2021: Hapoel Holon
- 2021–2023: Universo Treviso Basket
- 2023: Beşiktaş
- 2023–2024: Napoli Basket
- 2024–2025: Dinamo Sassari
- 2025–2026: Karşıyaka Basket
- 2026–present: Çayırova Belediyespor

Career highlights
- Italian Cup winner (2024); Italian Cup MVP (2024); 3× All-PLK Team (2015, 2018, 2019); 2× PLK Best Defender (2016, 2017); 2× PLK Best Polish Player (2018, 2019); 3× Polish Cup winner (2016, 2019, 2020); 2× Polish Supercup champion (2016, 2019)

Michał Sokołowski (born 11 December 1992) is a Polish professional basketball player for Çayırova Belediyespor of the Basketbol Süper Ligi (BSL). Sokołowski usually plays as small forward.

== Professional career ==
Sokołowski started playing professionally for Anwil Włocławek in 2011–12 season. He stayed with the club for three seasons and signed with Rosa Radom in 2014. He won the PLK Best Defender award twice while playing with Rosa Radom, in 2015–16 and 2016–17 season. He was also named the PLK Best Polish Player in season 2017–18.

He signed with Zielona Góra for 2018–19 season. He was named once again the PLK Best Polish Player for season 2018–19.

In July 2019, Sokołowski signed with his former club Anwil Włocławek. He averaged 5.3 points and 3.3 rebounds per game. On 24 August 2020 he signed with Legia Warszawa of the Polish Basketball League.

On 16 October 2020, soon after the beginning of the 2020–21 season, he signed with Universo Treviso Basket in the Italian Serie A.

In May 2021, he signed in Israel for Hapoel Holon.

He returned to Treviso for the 2021–22 season with a two-year contract.

On 18 January 2023 he signed with Beşiktaş Emlakjet of the Basketbol Süper Ligi (BSL).

On 10 July 2023 he signed with Napoli Basket of the Italian Lega Basket Serie A (LBA). On 18 February 2024, Napoli won their first Italian Cup following an upset win in the final over Olimpia Milano. Sokołowski recorded 13 points and 6 rebounds in the win and was named the Italian Cup MVP.

On May 31, 2024, he signed with Dinamo Sassari of the Italian Lega Basket Serie A (LBA).

On November 14, 2025, he signed with Karşıyaka Basket of Basketbol Süper Ligi (BSL).

On June 25, 2026, he signed with Çayırova Belediyespor of the Basketbol Süper Ligi (BSL).

== Career statistics ==
=== National team ===
Tournament	Pos.	GP	PPG	RPG	APG
EuroBasket 2017	18th	4	4.5	1.0	0.5
