= Pavel Antipov =

Russian basketball player

Free agent
- Position: Power forward

Personal information
- Born: September 19, 1991 (age 35) Kazan, Tatarstan, Russia
- Listed height: 6 ft 8.5 in (2.04 m)
- Listed weight: 232 lb (105 kg)

Career information
- NBA draft: 2013: undrafted
- Playing career: 2008–present

Career history
- 2008–2009: CSK VVS Samara
- 2009–12: Spartak St. Petersburg
- 2010–2011: →Nizhny Novgorod
- 2012–2015: UNICS Kazan
- 2015–2016: Zenit St. Petersburg
- 2016–2017: UNICS Kazan
- 2017–2018: Lokomotiv Kuban
- 2018–2020: Nizhny Novgorod
- 2020–2022: UNICS Kazan
- 2021–2022: Nizhny Novgorod

Career highlights
- Russian Cup winner (2014)
Medals
Men's basketball
Representing Russia
Summer Universiade
Gold medal – first place	2013 Russia
Bronze medal – third place	2015 South Korea

Pavel Valeryevich Antipov (Russian: Павел Валерьевич Антипов, born September 19, 1991) is a Russian professional basketball. Standing at 2.04 m (6 ft 8 in), he plays at the power forward positions.

== Professional career ==
Antipov has played with the following clubs in his pro career: CSK VVS Samara, Spartak St. Petersburg, Nizhny Novgorod, UNICS Kazan, and Zenit St. Petersburg.

Following the 2016–17 campaign, Antipov signed with Lokomotiv Kuban.

He signed with UNICS Kazan on June 18, 2020.

On July 26, 2021, he has signed third time with Nizhny Novgorod of the VTB United League.

== Russian national team ==
Antipov was a member of the junior national teams of Russia. With Russia's university national team, he won the gold medal at the 2013 World University Games, and the bronze medal at the 2015 World University Games.
