= Tommaso Baldasso =

Italian basketball player (born 1998)

No. 11 – Virtus Bologna
- Position: Point guard / shooting guard
- League: LBA; EuroLeague

Personal information
- Born: 29 January 1998 (age 28) Turin, Italy
- Listed height: 1.92 m (6 ft 4 in)
- Listed weight: 80 kg (176 lb)

Career information
- Playing career: 2014–present

Career history
- 2014–2016: PMS Basketball
- 2016–2020: Virtus Roma
- 2020–2021: Fortitudo Bologna
- 2021–2023: Olimpia Milano
- 2023–2026: Derthona
- 2026–present: Virtus Bologna

Career highlights
- 2× Italian League champion (2022, 2023); Italian Cup winner (2022)

Tommaso Baldasso (born 29 January 1998) is an Italian professional basketball player for Virtus Bologna of the Italian Lega Basket Serie A (LBA) and the EuroLeague. He mainly plays at the point guard position.

== National team career ==
Baldasso was selected for the senior national team to play in EuroBasket 2022 qualification. He made his debut on 30 November 2020 in the match won by 70 to 66 against Russia.
