= Filippo Baldi Rossi =

Italian basketball player (born 1991)

No. 8 – Pallacanestro Reggiana
- Position: Power forward / center
- League: LBA

Personal information
- Born: October 26, 1991 (age 35) Vignola, Italy
- Listed height: 2.07 m (6 ft 9 in)
- Listed weight: 97 kg (214 lb)

Career information
- Playing career: 2008–present

Career history
- 2008–2010: Virtus Bologna
- 2010–2012: →Perugia Basket
- 2012–2013: →Auxilium Torino
- 2013–2014: →Aquila Basket Trento
- 2014–2017: Aquila Basket Trento
- 2017–2020: Virtus Bologna
- 2020–present: Pallacanestro Reggiana

Career highlights
- FIBA Champions League champion (2019)
Medals
Men's basketball
Representing Italy
European U-20 Championship
Silver medal – second place	2011 Spain

Filippo Baldi Rossi (born October 26, 1991) is an Italian professional basketball player for Pallacanestro Reggiana of the Italian Lega Basket Serie A (LBA). Standing at 2.07 metres (6 feet 9 inches), he plays at the power forward and center positions.

== Professional career ==
=== Clubs ===
Filippo Baldi Rossi began to play with the senior team of Virtus Bologna at the age 17.

During the 2010–11 and 2011–12 seasons he played on loan to Perugia Basket. In 2012 he went to Auxilium Torino, where he played for only one season. In 2013 he signed a contract with Aquila Basket Trento in Serie A2 Basket. He still plays in the Trento's major basketball club in the Italian LBA.

On February 3, 2016, during a match of the Last 32 round in EuroCup against Pallacanestro Reggiana, he was severely injured on the left knee. and he had to undergo an operation on the front crusader. For that reason he blasted the rest of the season. A long rehabilitation took at the Isokinetic Centre in Bologna, Italy, where he got a full recovery after the operation.

On November 30, 2017, Baldi Rossi signed a deal with Segafredo Virtus Bologna. His contract ran through 2019. He signed a two-year deal with Pallacanestro Reggiana on July 16, 2020.

=== National team ===
Baldi Rossi played the 2011 FIBA Europe Under-20 Championship in 2011 with the Italy national under-20 basketball team, where he won the silver medal.

In 2017 Filippo Baldi Rossi officially entered into the experimental Italian Senior Basketball Team. He was in the 12s of coach Ettore Messina for EuroBasket 2017 in Israel and Turkey, because of Davide Pascolo who missed EuroBasket with a right knee injury.

== Honours ==
=== Club ===
Virtus Bologna

- Basketball Champions League: 2018–19

=== International ===
Italy Under-20

- 2011 FIBA Europe Under-20 Championship: Silver (silver)
