= Leonardo Totè =

Italian basketball player (born 1997)

No. 35 – Napoli Basket
- Position: Center / power forward
- League: LBA; EuroCup

Personal information
- Born: 8 July 1997 (age 29) Negrar di Valpolicella, Italy
- Listed height: 2.12 m (6 ft 11 in)
- Listed weight: 107 kg (236 lb)

Career information
- Playing career: 2015–present

Career history
- 2015–2016: Brescia
- 2016–2018: Scaligera Verona
- 2018–2019: Aurora Jesi
- 2019–2020: Victoria Libertas
- 2020–2022: Fortitudo Bologna
- 2021: →Bilbao
- 2022: Napoli Basket
- 2022–2024: Victoria Libertas
- 2024–2025: Napoli Basket
- 2025: Olimpia Milano
- 2026–present: Napoli Basket

Leonardo Totè (born July 8, 1997) is an Italian basketball player for Napoli Basket of the Italian Lega Basket Serie A (LBA) and the EuroCup.

== Professional career ==
He grew up as a basketball player in the youth teams of Scaligera Basket Verona and then in Reyer Venezia. In August 2015 he went on loan to Basket Brescia Leonessa gaining experience in Serie A2, subsequently also gaining promotion to Serie A with the Lombard club. In the summer of 2016, he again went on loan to Scaligera Basket Verona, thus returning after five years to the team of his hometown, playing in the Serie A2 East group, where he remained for two seasons. In June 2018 he was loaned again to Aurora Basket Jesi, a Serie A2 club also playing in the East group. In the summer of 2019 he was signed by the Serie A club Victoria Libertas Pesaro where he played his first season in the top Italian basketball league. On June 8, 2020, he signed a three-year contract with Fortitudo Bologna. He was then signed by Napoli Basket but after a season of only 4 games played he left the Neapolitan city to settle back with Victoria Libertas Pesaro. He played an excellent 2023–24 season as a protagonist but it was not enough to save the team. He was then signed again by Napoli Basket on June 11, 2024.

On September 22, 2025, he signed with Olimpia Milano of the Lega Basket Serie A (LBA).

== National career ==
He took part with the Italian national team in the FIBA Under-17 Basketball World Cup in 2014, the FIBA U18 Eurobasket in 2014 and 2015, the Under-19 World Championship in 2015, the FIBA Under-20 European Championships in 2016 and 2017 and in the Mediterranean Games in 2018 with the National 3x3 Under-23 team in which he won the silver medal. In 2019 he participated with the National 3x3 Under-23 team in the Fiba World Cup 2019 (Lanzhou, China).
