= Nicola Akele =

Italian basketball player (born 1995)

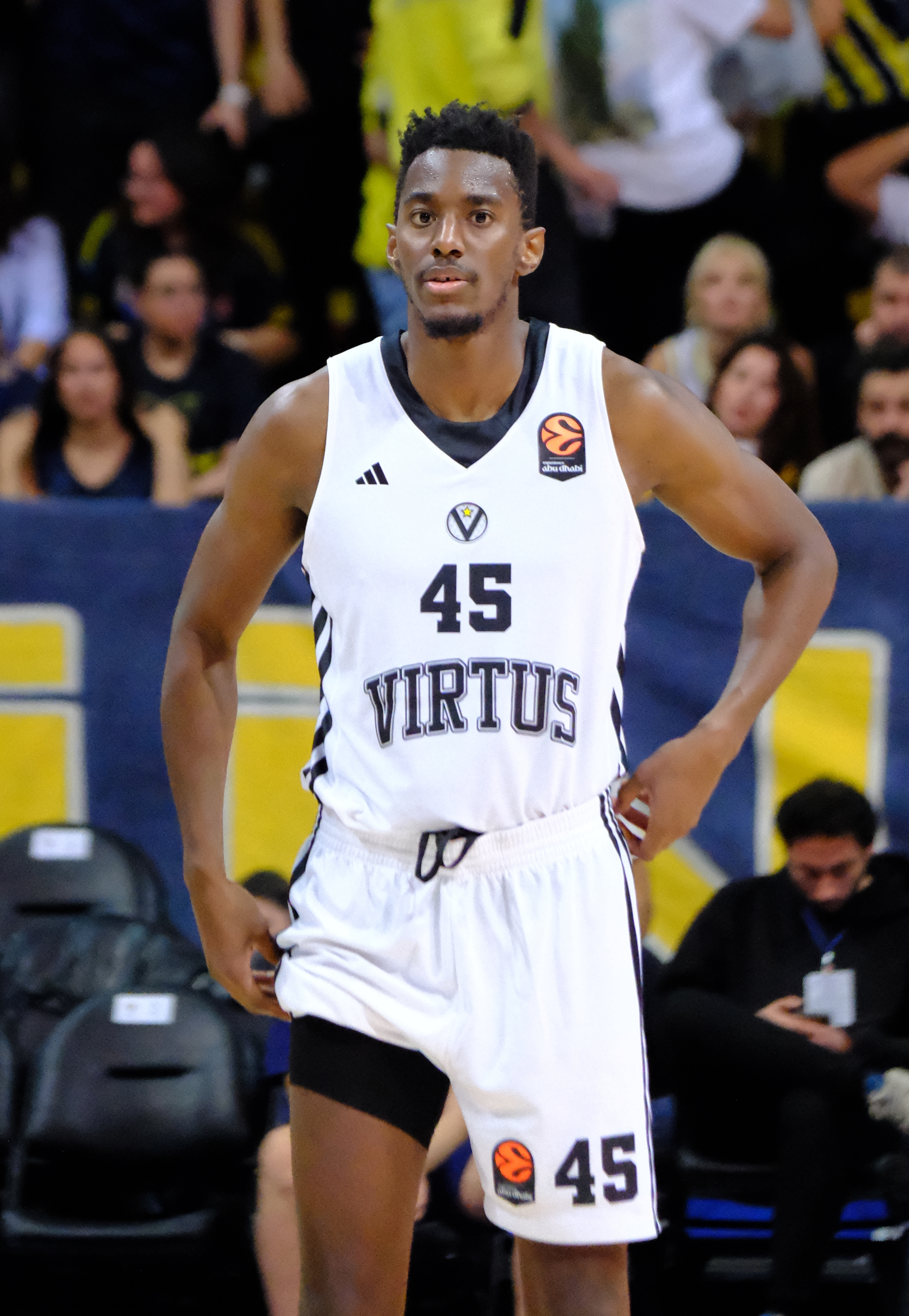
- Akele with Virtus Bologna in 2025

No. 45 – Olimpia Milano
- Position: Power forward
- League: LBA; EuroLeague

Personal information
- Born: 7 November 1995 (age 31) Treviso, Italy
- Listed height: 2.03 m (6 ft 8 in)
- Listed weight: 96 kg (212 lb)

Career information
- High school: IMG Academy (Bradenton, Florida)
- College: Rhode Island (2015–2018)
- NBA draft: 2019: undrafted
- Playing career: 2018–present

Career history
- 2013–2014: Reyer Venezia
- 2018–2019: Roseto Sharks
- 2019–2020: Vanoli Cremona
- 2020–2022: Universo Treviso
- 2022–2024: Brescia
- 2024–2026: Virtus Bologna
- 2026–present: Olimpia Milano

Career highlights
- Lega Serie A champion (2025); Italian Cup winner (2023); Italian Supercup winner (2026)

Nicola Akele (born 7 November 1995) is a Congolese–Italian professional basketball player for Olimpia Milano of the Italian Lega Basket Serie A (LBA) and the EuroLeague. He played college basketball for the Rhode Island Rams.

== Early life and high school career ==
Akele started playing basketball at age six, joining Basket Montebelluna, and also grew up playing football. Akele later played for Serie B club Bears Mestre before moving to the youth categories of Reyer Venezia. He missed half of the 2012–13 season with heart issues and started playing regularly for Reyer's senior team in the Serie A in the following year. In June 2014, Akele was loaned to Pallacanestro Trieste of the Serie A2 but did not play due to a contract dispute with Reyer.

For his next season, Akele attended IMG Academy in Bradenton, Florida, where he played for one of the best prep teams in the United States. He helped his team to a 23–4 record and a National Prep School Championship berth. On 9 May 2015, Akele committed to play college basketball for Rhode Island over offers from South Florida, George Washington and George Mason.

== College career ==
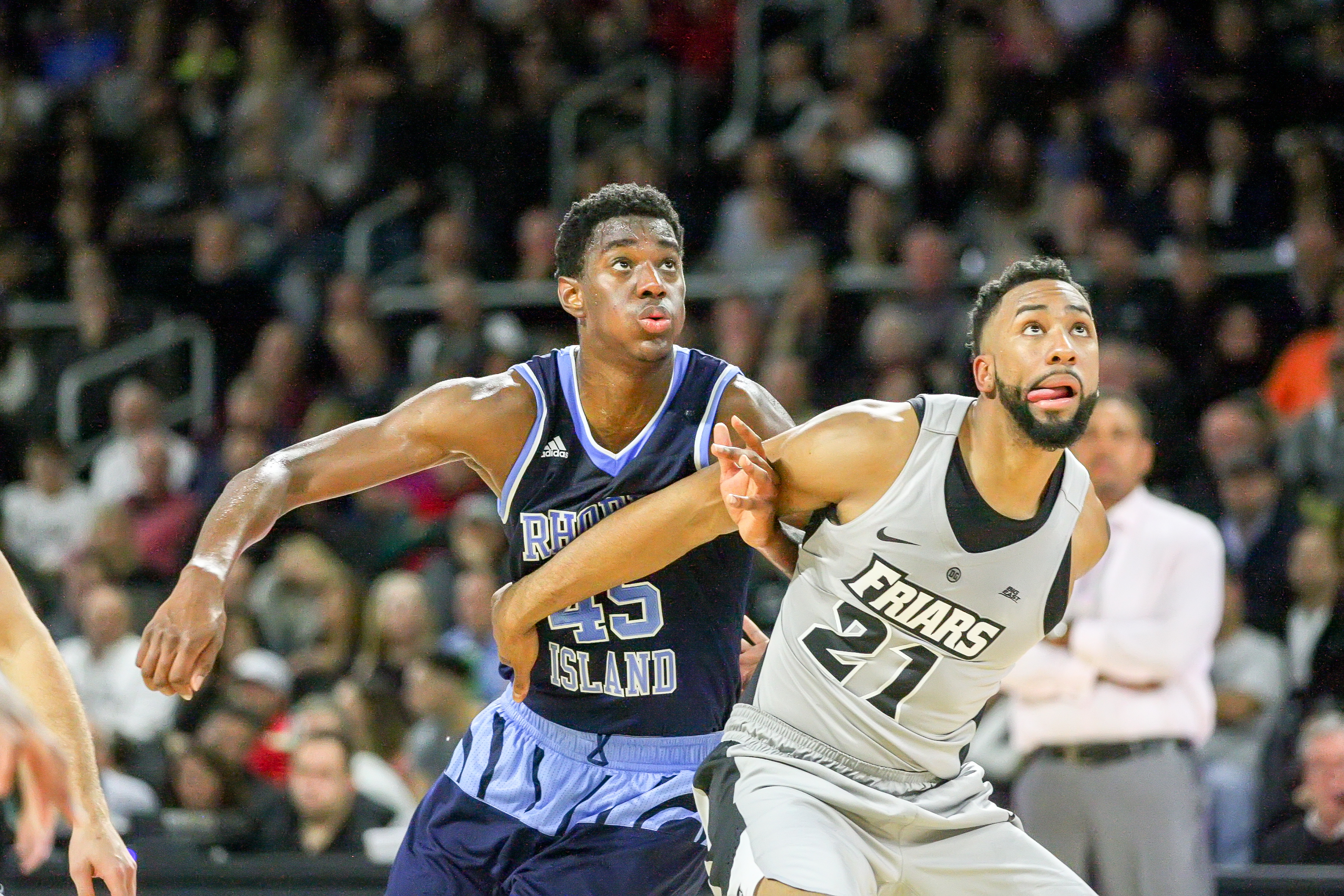
Akele (left) competes for a rebound with Providence's Jalen Lindsey in December 2016

Akele played three years of college basketball for Rhode Island. On 4 January 2016, he was named Atlantic 10 Conference Rookie of the Week after averaging eight points, 2.5 rebounds and 1.5 assists per game in wins over Brown and Saint Louis. Akele scored a freshman season-high and a career-high 15 points in a 79–62 victory over La Salle. Over three years at Rhode Island, he averaged 2.6 points and 2.2 rebounds in 11.7 minutes per game, starting in six of his 96 appearances. Akele left after his junior season to play professionally in Italy.

== Professional career ==
On 4 September 2018, Akele signed with Roseto Sharks of the Serie A2 Basket. He recorded a season-high 34 points and 10 rebounds in a December 2 win over Ravenna. In the 2018–19 season, he averaged 13.4 points, 6.9 rebounds and 1.5 assists per game. On 11 June 2019, Akele signed a three-year contract with Vanoli Cremona of the Lega Basket Serie A (LBA). On 24 December, he was named the top Italian player in Round 14 after posting a season-high 21 points, six rebounds and three assists in a 93–72 win over Varese. In 2019–20, Akele averaged 7.6 points and 4.2 rebounds per game in the LBA.

On 25 June 2020, he signed with Universo Treviso Basket of the LBA.

On June 25, 2022, he has signed with Germani Brescia of the Italian Lega Basket Serie A (LBA).

In 2024, he signed with Virtus Bologna of the Italian LBA and the EuroLeague. Virtus ended the EuroLeague at the 17th place, after a disappointing regular season. After arriving first in the national championship season, Virtus eliminated Venezia 3–2 and their arch-rival Milan 3–1, reaching their fifth finals in a row. They then defeated Brescia 3–0, claiming the Italian championship title for the 17th time. For Akele, this was the first scudetto of his career.

On July 6, 2026, Akele signed with Olimpia Milano of the Lega Basket Serie A (LBA) and the EuroLeague.

== National team career ==
Akele represented Italy at various junior international tournaments from 2011 to 2015. In February 2020, he made his senior team debut after being called up to the Italy team for EuroBasket 2021 qualification. Akele made a second appearance for the Italian Nation Team in EuroBasket 2021 Qualifiers in November 2020.

== Personal life ==
Akele's family descends from Kinshasa, Zaire. His parents moved to Italy in the 1990s. He was married in July 2022.
