= Meo Sacchetti =

Italian basketball player & coach (born 1953)

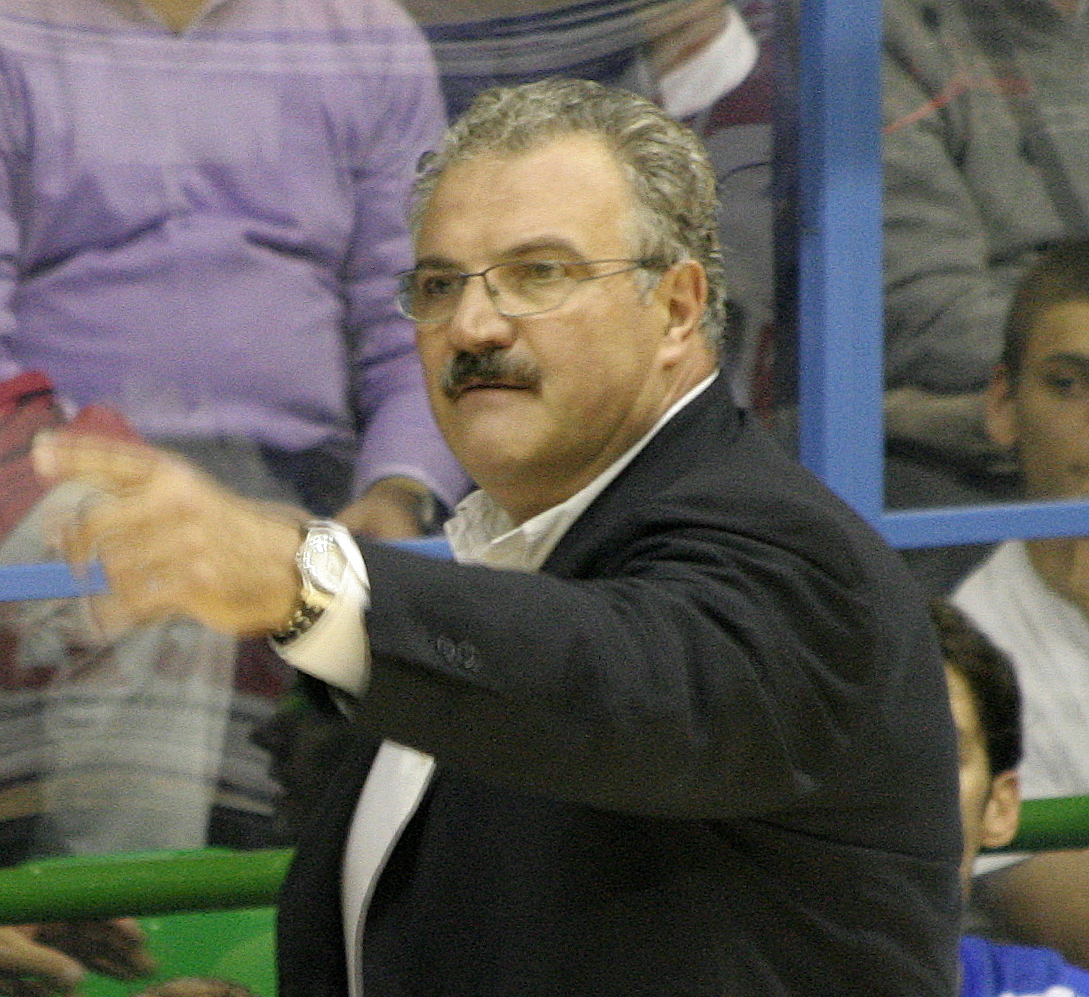
- Sacchetti, as head coach of Dinamo Sassari.

Personal information
- Born: August 20, 1953 (age 73) Altamura, Italy
- Listed height: 6 ft 6.5 in (1.99 m)
- Listed weight: 247 lb (112 kg)

Career information
- Playing career: 1973–1992
- Position: Power forward
- Number: 14
- Coaching career: 1993–present

Career history

Playing
- 1973–1974: Libertas Asti
- 1974–1975: Auxilium Torino
- 1975–1976: Libertas Asti
- 1976–1979: Sporting Club Gira Bologna
- 1979–1984: Auxilium Torino
- 1984–1992: Varese

Coaching
- 1993–1996: Auxilium Torino (assistant)
- 1996–1998: Auxilium Torino
- 1998–2001: Libertas Asti
- 2001–2002: Celana Bergamo
- 2002–2005: Castelletto Ticino
- 2005–2006: Fabriano Basket
- 2006–2007: Castelletto Ticino
- 2007–2008: Orlandina Basket
- 2008–2009: Pallacanestro Udine
- 2009–2015: Dinamo Sassari
- 2016–2017: Enel Brindisi
- 2017–2020: Vanoli Basket
- 2020: Fortitudo Bologna
- 2022–2023: Pallacanestro Cantù
- 2024: VL Pesaro

Career highlights
- As player: Italian 2nd Division champion (1977); Italian Basketball Hall of Fame (2016); As head coach: Italian League champion (2015); 3× Italian Cup winner (2014, 2015, 2019); Italian Supercup winner (2014); 2× Italian League Coach of the Year (2012, 2019); Italian 3rd Division champion (2004)
Medals
Representing Italy
Men's basketball
Summer Olympic Games
Silver medal – second place	1980 Moscow
FIBA EuroBasket
Gold medal – first place	1983 France
Bronze medal – third place	West Germany 1985
Mediterranean Games
Silver medal – second place	1983 Casablanca

Romeo "Meo" Sacchetti (born August 20, 1953) is an Italian professional basketball coach and former player, who is recently the head coach for Pallacanestro Cantù of the Serie A2.

Standing at a height of 1.99 m (6 ft 6 1/2 in), he played at the power forward, during his playing career. As a player, he won the silver medal with the Italian national team, at the 1980 Summer Olympic Games, in Moscow.

== Playing career ==
=== Club playing career ===
At the pro club level, Sacchetti played with several Italian teams, and he competed in Italy's top-tier level, the Lega Basket Serie A (Italian First Division). He played with Saclà Asti, during the 1973–74 season. He them moved to Saclà Torino, where he spent the 1974–75 season. He then played with Fernet Tonic Bologna (also known as Amaro Harrys Bologna), from 1976 to 1979. In his first season with Bologna, the 1976–77 season, Sacchetti played in the Italian Second Division competition, the Serie A2.

After that, Sacchetti again played with Torino (also known as Grimaldi Torino and Berloni Torino), from 1979 to 1984. He finished his playing career with Ciao Crem Varese (also known as Divarese Varese and Ranger Varese), where he played from 1984 to 1992.

=== National team career ===
Sacchetti was a member of the senior men's Italian national team. With Italy's senior national team, he won a silver medal at the 1980 Moscow Summer Olympics. He also won a gold medal at the 1983 FIBA EuroBasket, and a bronze medal at the 1985 FIBA EuroBasket.

Sachetti also represented Italy at the 1984 Los Angeles Summer Olympics, and at the 1986 FIBA World Championship.

== Coaching career ==
=== Clubs ===
Sacchetti began his basketball coaching career in 1993. While he was the head coach of Dinamo Sassari, he was named the Italian League Coach of the Year, in 2012. He won the Italian Cup title in 2014 and 2015. He also won the Italian Supercup title in 2014, and the Italian League championship in 2015.

=== Italian senior national team ===
In 2017, Sacchetti was named the head coach of the senior men's Italian national team, replacing Ettore Messina in that role. In 2022, he was replaced in the role by Gianmarco Pozzecco.

== Personal life ==
Sacchetti's son, Brian Sacchetti, is a professional basketball player. Sacchetti coached his son Brian, while Brian was a player of the Italian League club Dinamo Sassari.
