= Michele Vitali =

Italian basketball player (born 1991)

- Vitali with Andorra in 2018

No. 31 – Dinamo Sassari
- Position: Shooting guard
- League: LBA

Personal information
- Born: 31 October 1991 (age 35) Bologna, Italy
- Listed height: 1.96 m (6 ft 5 in)
- Listed weight: 88 kg (194 lb)

Career information
- NBA draft: 2013: undrafted
- Playing career: 2010–present

Career history
- 2010–2012: Virtus Bologna
- 2010–2011: →Gira Ozzano
- 2012–2013: Biancoblù Bologna
- 2014–2015: Juvecaserta
- 2015–2016: Virtus Bologna
- 2016–2018: Brescia
- 2018–2019: Andorra
- 2019–2020: Dinamo Sassari
- 2020–2021: Brose Bamberg
- 2021–2022: Reyer Venezia
- 2022–2026: Reggiana
- 2026–present: Dinamo Sassari
Medals
Men's basketball
Representing Italy
FIBA Europe Under-20 Championship
Silver medal – second place	2011 Bilbao	National Team

Michele Vitali (born 31 October 1991) is an Italian professional basketball player for Dinamo Sassari of the Italian Lega Basket Serie A (LBA) as a shooting guard.

== Personal life ==
His brother is fellow pro basketball player Luca Vitali, Michele has played against him a few times in Serie A and together on a few occasions, including one season for Virtus Bologna and notably for the national team.

Their parents were also basketball players, their mother Anna Maria Mazzoli and their father Roberto both played in the Italian lower divisions, peculiarly they met in 1978 whilst they were attending an event with their respective youth national teams.

== Professional career ==
Vitali progressed through the youth ranks of home town club Virtus Bologna, he was called up to the first squad on occasion and made his first division debut in February 2009 playing a single minute with one missed shot. That was his only appearance for the senior team for the season, he wouldn't be able to break into the side either in 2009–10 with two solitary minutes but he played a decisive role as the Under-19 squad won their national championship.

To gain experience he was loaned to new Virtus satellite club Gira Ozzano (in Italian) in the third division for 2010–11. It proved to be a fruitful loan as he played 27 games with 9,8 points on average for Gira.

Following this positive experience he returned to Virtus but didn't manage to break into the first squad, playing only three games the whole season. This prompted him to rescind his contract with Virtus and join cross town side Biancoblù Basket Bologna (in Italian) of the Legadue in October 2012. His time with the white and blue proved successful, he established himself as a starter for the team, playing 27 games with 9.8 points on average and even participated in the Legadue All Star Game where he was voted best player under 24.

His performances garnered interest from Serie A clubs, after Biancoblù lost in the promotion playoffs, he joined Juvecaserta Basket in July 2014.

In his first full top division season Vitali was an important player as Caserta finished just outside the playoff places, playing in all but one game, he was also selected for the All Star Game after other players proved unavailable.

The 2014–15 season proved to be more complicated, Vitali missed the first part of the season with a knee injury and - as a starter - could not stop Caserta's relegation, confirmed after a loss in the last game of the season.

On 2 July 2015, Vitali signed a two-year contract with Virtus Bologna of the Italian LBA.

On 4 August 2016, Vitali signed a one-year deal with Basket Brescia Leonessa and joined his brother Luca Vitali. On 29 June 2017, he extended his contract with Brescia for one more season. On 10 July 2017, Michele officially left Brescia after two great seasons in LBA.

On 10 July 2018, Vitali signed a two-year contract with the Spanish club MoraBanc Andorra.

Vitali spent the 2019–20 season with Dinamo Sassari and averaged 10.3 points and three rebounds per game. On 28 July 2020, Vitali signed with Brose Bamberg of the German Basketball Bundesliga.

He returned in Italy on 24 June 2021, signing a multi-year contract with Reyer Venezia.

On 6 August 2022, he has signed with Reggio Emilia of the Italian Lega Basket Serie A (LBA).

== Career statistics ==
=== Domestic league ===
==== Regular season ====
Legend
GP	Games played	GS	Games started	MPG	Minutes per game	PPG	Points per game
2P%	Two-point field goal percentage	3P%	3-point field goal percentage	FT%	Free throw percentage
RPG	Rebounds per game	APG	Assists per game	BPG	Blocks per game
SPG	Steals per game	TOPG	Turnovers per game	**Bold**	Career high

Year	Team	GP	GS	MPG	PPG	2P%	3P%	FT%	RPG	APG	BPG	SPG	TOPG
2011-12	Canadian Solar Bologna	3	0	3.3	1.7	0	**100.0**	66.7	0.7	0.3	0	0.3	0.7
2013-14	Pasta Reggia Caserta	**29**	8	23.7	**8.3**	**46.5**	30.9	70	**3.4**	1	0	0.7	0.9
2014-15	Pasta Reggia Caserta	22	**21**	**25.4**	7.5	42.9	25.4	**78.4**	2.5	**1.3**	0	**0.8**	**1.9**
Career		54	29	14.9	5.8	44.5	28.9	73.4	2.2	1.1	0	0.7	1.2

== International career ==
He first played in the under aged categories for Italy, for the U18's in the 2009 European Championship, then for the U20's in the 2010 European Championship and the 2011 European Championship, most notably winning the silver medal at the latter edition.

After falling off the radar for a period, he joined the senior national team in 2014, helping Italy qualify for EuroBasket 2015.
