= Giordano Bortolani =

Italian basketball player (born 2000)

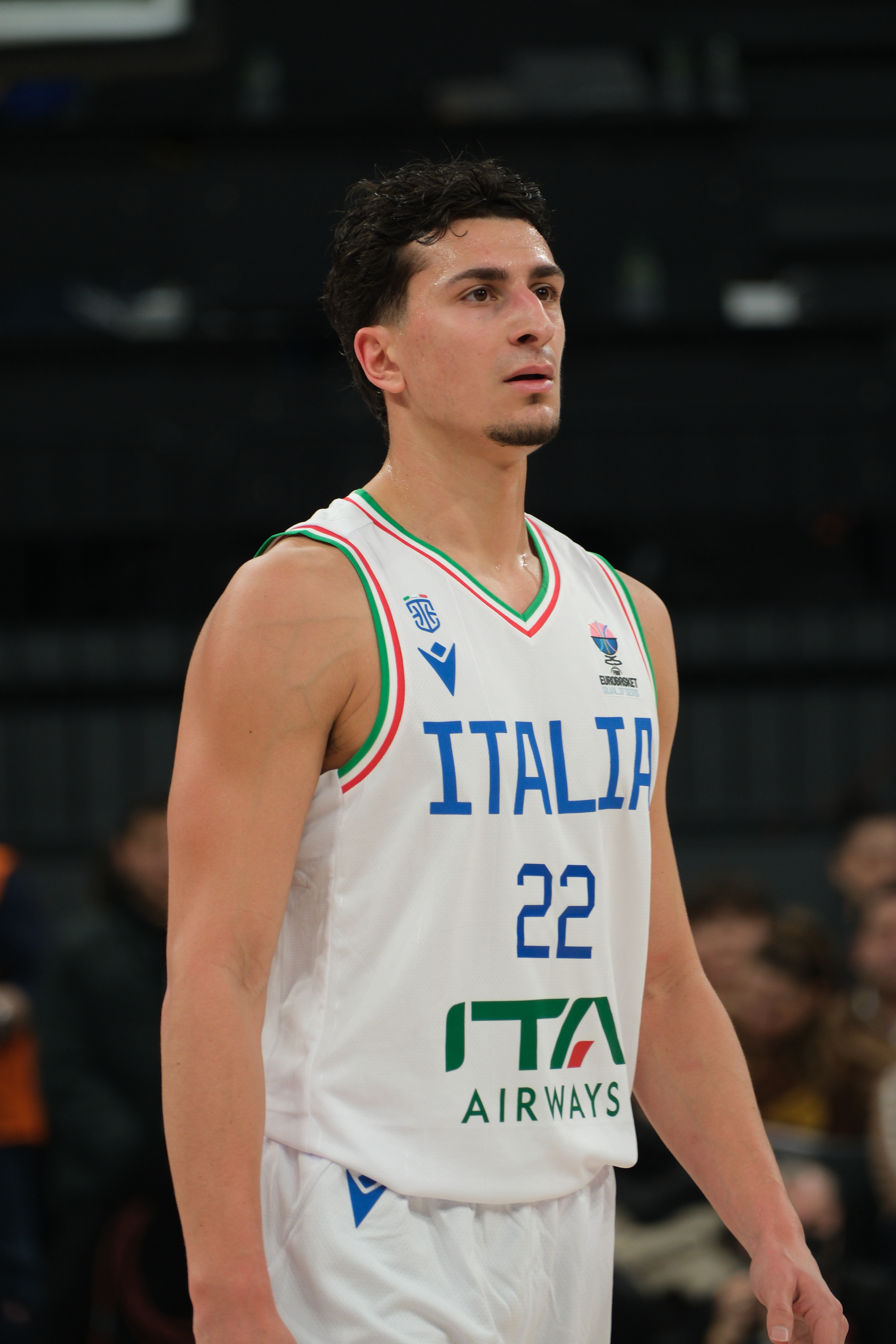
- Bortolani with the Italy national team in 2025

No. 12 – Derthona Basket
- Position: Shooting guard / Point guard
- League: LBA; EuroCup

Personal information
- Born: 2 December 2000 (age 25) Sant'Agata di Militello, Sicily, Italy
- Listed height: 1.93 m (6 ft 4 in)
- Listed weight: 85 kg (187 lb)

Career information
- Playing career: 2018–present

Career history
- 2018–2025: Olimpia Milano
- 2017–2018: →Bernareggio 99
- 2018–2019: →Legnano Knights
- 2019–2020: →Biella
- 2020–2021: →Brescia
- 2021–2022: →Treviso Basket
- 2022: →Manresa
- 2022–2023: →Scaligera Verona
- 2025–2026: Cantù
- 2026–present: Derthona Basket

Career highlights
- FIBA Champions League Best Young Player (2022); Lega Serie A champion (2024); Italian Supercup winner (2024)

Giordano Bortolani (born 2 December 2000) is an Italian professional basketball player for Derthona Basket of the Italian Lega Basket Serie A (LBA) and the EuroCup.

== Professional career ==
Raised in the youth sector of the team, Bortolani made four appearances in Serie A with Olimpia Milano, while he was in double membership with Bernareggio in Serie B.

Subsequently, in July 2018, he was loaned to Serie A2 to the Legnano Knights, with whom he averaged 12 points, while in July 2019 he went on loan to Pallacanestro Biella where he went on to average 15 points per game in the 25 matches played with the club.

On 20 June 2020 he renewed for five years with Milan to then be loaned again on July 1, this time in the Italian top league at Pallacanestro Brescia. On 8 July 2021 he went again with the loan formula to Treviso Basket. During his time there, he also played the Basketball Champions League with the team, winning the award for Best Young Player, while averaging 14.7 points and 2.7 rebounds per game.

After going to Spain on 19 July 2022 to play with Bàsquet Manresa (once again with the loan formula), where he averaged 10.1 points per game in 7 games with the team, on 24 November 2022, he returned in Italy where he was loaned this time to Scaligera Basket Verona.

On 11 July 2023 Bortolani returned to the main squad of Olimpia Milano.

On June 28, 2025, he signed with Pallacanestro Cantù of the Italian Lega Basket Serie A (LBA).

On July 18, 2026, he signed with Derthona Basket of the Italian Lega Basket Serie A (LBA).

== National team career ==
=== Junior team career ===
In the summer of 2018 he took part in the FIBA U18 European Championship in Ventspils, making his debut on 1 August against Russia.

=== Senior team career ===
He made his debut with the senior national team on 20 February 2020 in the match valid for the EuroBasket 2022 qualification, scoring 3 points in an 83–64 win against Russia.

== Career statistics ==
Legend
GP	Games played	GS	Games started	MPG	Minutes per game
FG%	Field-goal percentage	3P%	3-point field-goal percentage	FT%	Free-throw percentage
RPG	Rebounds per game	APG	Assists per game	SPG	Steals per game
BPG	Blocks per game	PPG	Points per game	PIR	Performance index rating
**Bold**	Career high

=== EuroLeague ===
Year	Team	GP	GS	MPG	FG%	3P%	FT%	RPG	APG	SPG	BPG	PPG	PIR
2023–24	Olimpia Milano	18	0	7.5	.424	.447	.923	.7	.3	.2	.1	4.4	3.4
Career		18	0	7.5	.424	.447	.923	.7	.3	.2	.1	4.4	3.4

=== EuroCup ===
Year	Team	GP	GS	MPG	FG%	3P%	FT%	RPG	APG	SPG	BPG	PPG	PIR
2020–21	Brescia	9	2	14.3	.478	.364	1.000	1.1	.6	.2	.1	6.4	3.0
Career		9	2	14.3	.478	.364	1.000	1.1	.6	.2	.1	6.4	3.0

=== Basketball Champions League ===
Year	Team	GP	GS	MPG	FG%	3P%	FT%	RPG	APG	SPG	BPG	PPG
2021–22	Universo Treviso	**14**	**3**	**22.4**	**.565**	**.569**	**.935**	**2.7**	**1.0**	.2	—	**14.7**
2022–23	Manresa	2	1	16.6	.429	.300	.800	1.0	.5	**1.0**	—	9.5
Career		16	4	21.6	.551	.533	.917	2.5	.9	.3	—	14.1

=== Domestic leagues ===
Year	Team	League	GP	MPG	FG%	3P%	FT%	RPG	APG	SPG	BPG	PPG
2017–18	(Italy) Olimpia Milano	LBA	4	2.0	.500	1.000	—	—	—	—	—	1.5
2017–18	(Italy) Bernareggio	Serie B	24	20.7	.422	.380	.741	2.6	.9	.6	.1	10.3
2018–19	(Italy) Legnano Knights	Serie A2	38	25.4	.448	.398	.747	2.5	1.1	.3	.1	11.8
2019–20	(Italy) Biella	Serie A2	25	27.7	.392	.316	.830	3.0	1.0	.5	.2	14.9
2020–21	(Italy) Brescia	LBA	26	11.8	.482	.441	.893	1.2	.5	.2	.1	6.2
2021–22	(Italy) Universo Treviso	LBA	30	23.4	.404	.389	.855	2.5	1.3	.5	—	11.8
2022–23	(Spain) Manresa	ACB	7	16.8	.386	.324	.938	1.7	.3	.7	—	10.1
2022–23	(Italy) Scaligera Verona	LBA	22	17.8	.440	.357	.830	1.6	.5	.3	.0	9.9
2023–24	(Italy) Olimpia Milano	LBA	29	10.0	.356	.339	.760	.8	.7	.1	.0	3.5
