= Davide Alviti =

Italian basketball player (born 1996)

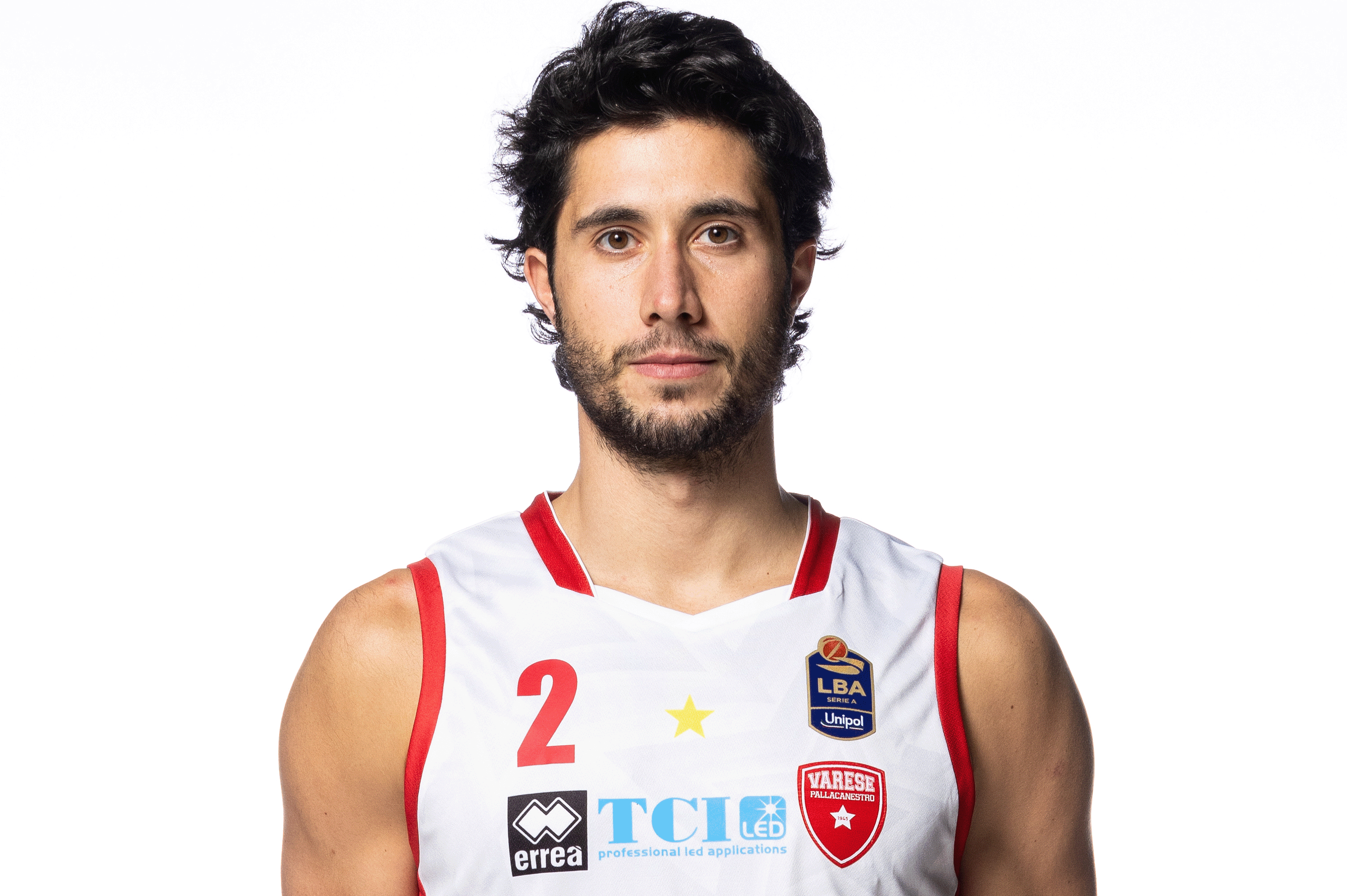

No. 2 – Openjobmetis Varese
- Position: Small forward
- League: LBA; Champions League

Personal information
- Born: 5 November 1996 (age 30) Alatri, Italy
- Listed height: 2.00 m (6 ft 7 in)
- Listed weight: 88 kg (194 lb)

Career information
- Playing career: 2013–present

Career history
- 2020–2021: Pallacanestro Trieste
- 2021–2023: Olimpia Milano
- 2023–2024: Dolomiti Energia Trento
- 2024–present: Pallacanestro Varese

Career highlights
- Italian League champion (2022); Italian Cup winner (2022)

Davide Alviti (born 5 November 1996) is an Italian professional basketball player for Pallacanestro Varese of the Lega Basket Serie A (LBA). who last played for Olimpia Milano of the Italian Lega Basket Serie A (LBA) and the EuroLeague.

== National team ==
Alviti has been a member of Italy's national basketball team.
