= Leonardo Candi =

Italian basketball player (born 1997)

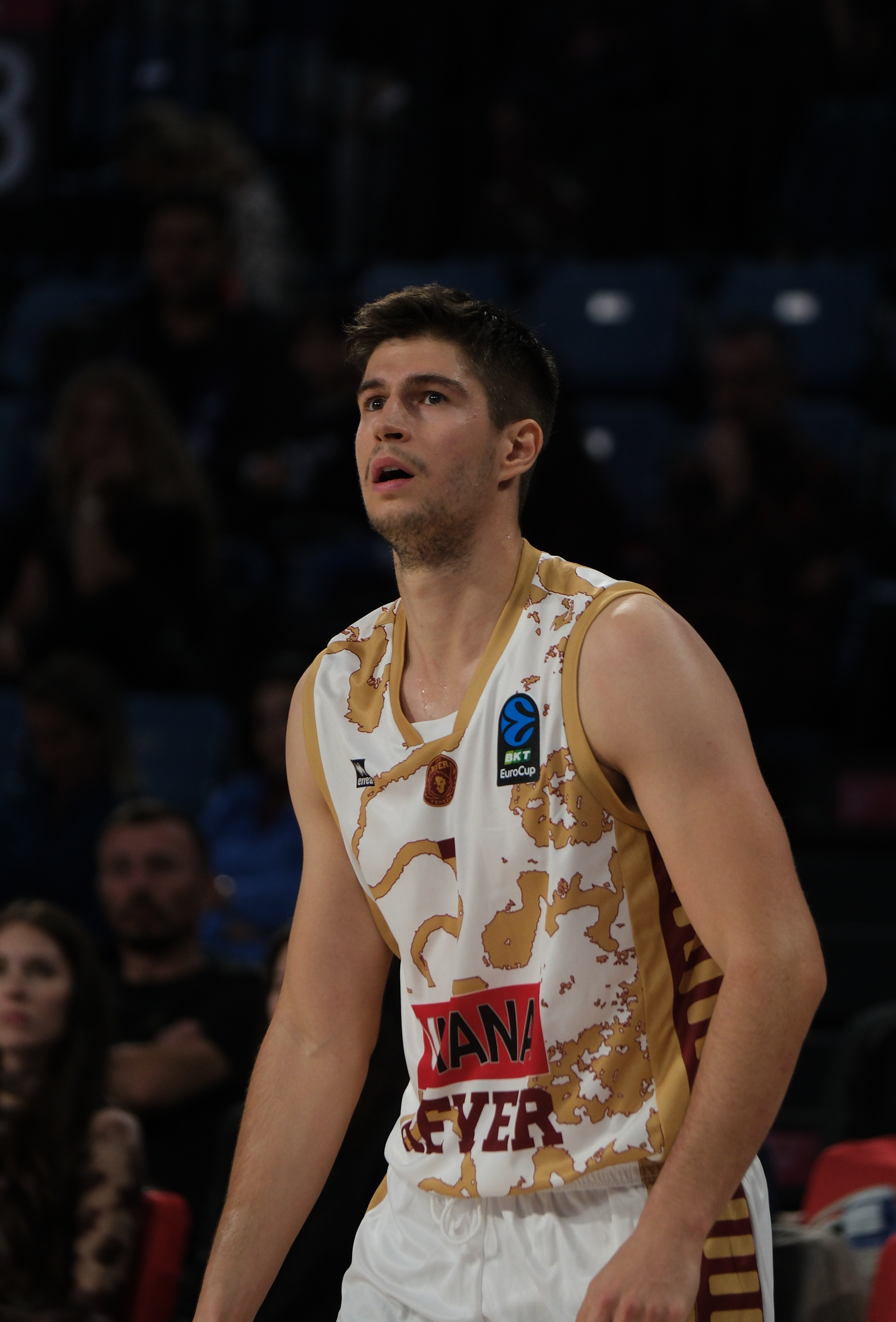
- Candi with Reyer Venezia in 2025

No. 7 – Umana Reyer Venezia
- Position: Point guard
- League: LBA; EuroCup

Personal information
- Born: 30 March 1997 (age 29) Bologna, Italy
- Listed height: 1.90 m (6 ft 3 in)
- Listed weight: 86 kg (190 lb)

Career information
- Playing career: 2013–present

Career history
- 2013–2017: Fortitudo Bologna
- 2017–2022: Pallacanestro Reggiana
- 2022–2025: Derthona Basket
- 2025–present: Reyer Venezia

Leonardo Candi (born 30 March 1997) is an Italian professional basketball player for Umana Reyer Venezia of the Italian Lega Basket Serie A (LBA) and the EuroCup. He plays point guard position.

== Professional career ==
He signed for Reyer Venezia in June 2025.
