= 2020–21 Olimpia Milano season =

Italian basketball season

Olimpia Milano
2020–21 season
- Owner: Giorgio Armani
- President: Pantaleo Dell'Orco
- Head coach: Ettore Messina
- Arena: Mediolanum Forum
- LBA: 1st of 15
- Playoffs: Runner-up
- EuroLeague: 3rd
- Italian Cup: Winners
- Supercup: Winners
- PIR leader: (Denmark) Shields 15.3
- Scoring leader: (Denmark) Shields 13.7
- Rebounding leader: (United States) LeDay 5.2
- Assists leader: (Spain) Rodríguez 5.0
- Biggest win: +40; 64–104 vs Treviso (4 October 2020)
- Biggest defeat: −19; 81–100 vs Trieste (31 January 2021)
Serie A	Euroleague	Italian Cup

The 2019–20 season sees Olimpia Milano competing in both EuroLeague and Lega Basket Serie A. The first is the highest level of European basketball competitions, for which Milano has a license.

== Overview ==
Olimpia Milano's 2020–2021 season is sponsored by AX Armani Exchange and it's the 88th consecutive season in the Serie A. It's also Ettore Messina's second year as the team's coach: in his first year Milano was struggling both in Euroleague and Serie A, but at the end due to the COVID-19 pandemic interruptions the team ended the season without any trophy.

The new season starts under the best auspices with the Eurosport Supercup victory and 8 games won out of 8.

Milano had a great start and by mid November they had a seven game winning streak in the Serie A and just two losses in Euroleague. But the season (especially in the Euroleague) could not proceed as per schedule due to postponed games caused by many players contracting SARS-CoV-2. Milano was forced to interrupt the team activities on 9 November when, after the game against Brescia, several players were tested positive.

Milano ends at the first place in the standing the first half of the season gaining the unofficial title of "winter champions" and they qualified to the Italian Basketball Cup. They dominated the competition and won the final against Pesaro.

In the EuroLeague Milano qualified to the playoffs ending the season in the fourth place which gave home advantage. A sensational win against Bayern Munich at the quarterfinals qualified Milano to the Final Four where they lost the semifinals at the last shot against Barcelona. The team will end the competition at the third place winning against CSKA Moscow third place game. The last qualification to a EuroLeague playoff series dates back to the 1991–92 edition.

The Serie A regular season ended with Milano in the first place of the standing, with 22 wins and 6 losses. At the playoffs Milano was the favourite for the title, but at the end things will not turn in the team's advantage: they reached the finals after winning against Dolomiti Energia Trento and Umana Reyer Venezia with a full 3-0 result. But in the final series the players showed signs of weariness from the long season and they lost all of the five matches of the finals against Virtus Segafredo Bologna that won the competition.

== Timeline ==
- 3 August: Milano starts the summer preparation.
- 27 August: the season officially starts with the 2020 Italian Basketball Supercup, Milano debuts with a win against Cantù.
- 20 September: Milano wins the Supercup in the final played against Virtus Segafredo Bologna.
- 27 September: starts the 2020–21 LBA season.
- 2 October: starts the 2020–21 EuroLeague season.
- 9 November: the team activities are suspended after several player were tested positive to SARS-CoV-2.
- 15 November: the previous COVID tests showed many false positive and Milan, after further tests, resumed the team activities and played the derby against Cantù.
- 10 January: Milano ends the first half of the season at the first place in the Serie A and gains the unofficial title of "Winter Champions".
- 14 February: Milano wins the Italian Cup.
- 31 March: Milano wins over Crvena zvezda and reaches mathematically the playoffs two matches before the end of the Euroleague regular season.
- 5 May: Milano wins 5-3 the playoff series against Bayern Munich and reaches the Final Four after 14 years.
- 11 May: Milano ends the regular season winning over Cremona at the first position.
- 29 May: Milano loses against Barcelona the Final Four Semifinal. The win over CSKA Moscow will give Milano the 3rd place in the competition.
- 12 June: Milano loses 4–0 the LBA Finals series against Virtus Bologna.

== Kit ==
Supplier: Armani / Sponsor: Armani Exchange

=== EuroLeague ===
Euroleague playoffs home	Euroleague playoffs away	Euroleague regular season home	Euroleague regular season away

=== Lega Basket Serie A ===
Serie A playoffs home	Serie A playoffs home	Serie A regular season home	Serie A regular season away	Serie A regular season grey

=== Cups ===
Italian Cup home	Italian Cup away	Supercup home	Supercup away

== Team ==
=== Players ===
AX Armani Exchange Olimpia Milano roster
Players
Coaches

Pos.	No.	Nat.	Name	Ht.	Wt.	Age
SG	0	(United States)	Punter, Kevin	1.93 m (6 ft 4 in)	81 kg (179 lb)	33 – 25 June 1993
F/C	2	(United States)	LeDay, Zach	2.02 m (6 ft 8 in)	103 kg (227 lb)	32 – 30 May 1994
G	3	(Italy)	Moretti, Davide	1.90 m (6 ft 3 in)	82 kg (181 lb)	28 – 25 March 1998
SF	5	(Serbia)	Micov, Vladimir	2.01 m (6 ft 7 in)	101 kg (223 lb)	41 – 16 April 1985
G/F	9	(Italy)	Moraschini, Riccardo	1.94 m (6 ft 4 in)	103 kg (227 lb)	35 – 8 January 1991
G/F	10	(Tunisia)	Roll, Michael	1.98 m (6 ft 6 in)	92 kg (203 lb)	39 – 12 April 1987
PG	13	(Spain)	Rodríguez, Sergio	1.91 m (6 ft 3 in)	84 kg (185 lb)	40 – 12 June 1986
C	15	(United States)	Tarczewski, Kaleb	2.13 m (7 ft 0 in)	111 kg (245 lb)	33 – 26 February 1993
F/C	19	(Italy)	Biligha, Paul	2.00 m (6 ft 7 in)	100 kg (220 lb)	36 – 31 May 1990
PG	20	(Italy)	Cinciarini, Andrea (C)	1.90 m (6 ft 3 in)	85 kg (187 lb)	40 – 21 June 1986
G	23	(United States)	Delaney, Malcolm	1.91 m (6 ft 3 in)	86 kg (190 lb)	37 – 11 March 1989
SF	31	(Denmark)	Shields, Shavon	2.01 m (6 ft 7 in)	100 kg (220 lb)	32 – 5 June 1994
PF	32	(Italy)	Brooks, Jeff	2.03 m (6 ft 8 in)	94 kg (207 lb)	37 – 12 June 1989
F/C	40	(United States)	Evans, Jeremy (EL)	2.06 m (6 ft 9 in)	93 kg (205 lb)	38 – 24 October 1987
C	42	(United States)	Hines, Kyle	1.98 m (6 ft 6 in)	115 kg (254 lb)	40 – 2 September 1986
F	70	(Italy)	Datome, Luigi	2.03 m (6 ft 8 in)	101 kg (223 lb)	38 – 27 November 1987
C	81	(Poland)	Wojciechowski, Jakub (LBA)	2.13 m (7 ft 0 in)	112 kg (247 lb)	36 – 9 January 1990

Head coach

- (Italy) Ettore Messina

Assistant coach(es)

- (United States) Tom Bialaszewski
- (Italy) Mario Fioretti
- (Italy) Marco Esposito
- (Italy) Stefano Bizzozero

Legend

- (C) Team captain
- (LBA) LBA only
- (EL) Euroleague only
- Injured

- Roster
Updated: 11 June 2021

Note: Flags indicate national team eligibility at FIBA-sanctioned events. Players may hold other non-FIBA nationalities not displayed.

=== Depth chart ===
Pos.	Starting 5	Bench 1	Bench 2	Bench 3
C	Kyle Hines	Kaleb Tarczewski	Paul Biligha	Jakub Wojciechowski ^{LBA}
PF	Zach LeDay	Luigi Datome	Jeff Brooks	Jeremy Evans ^{EL}
SF	Shavon Shields	Vladimir Micov	Riccardo Moraschini
SG	Kevin Punter	Michael Roll	Davide Moretti	Francesco Gravaghi
PG	Malcolm Delaney	Sergio Rodríguez	Andrea Cinciarini

6+6 format (colours: Italian or homegrown players; foreign players; young players; injured or inactive players)

Notes

- ^EL EuroLeague only
- ^LBA LBA only

=== Squad changes ===
==== In ====
No.	Pos.	Nat.	Name	Age	Moving from		Type	Ends	Transfer fee	Date	Source
3	G	(Italy)	Davide Moretti	22	Texas Tech Red Raiders	(United States)	3+2 years	June 2023 + 2025	Free	26 May 2020	
23	G	(United States)	Malcolm Delaney	31	Barcelona	(Spain)	2 years	June 2022	Free	2 June 2020	
42	C	(United States)	Kyle Hines	33	CSKA Moscow	(Russia)	2 years	June 2022	Undisclosed	3 June 2020	
0	SG	(United States) (Serbia)	Kevin Punter	26	Crvena zvezda	(Serbia)	1 year	June 2021	Free	18 June 2020	
70	F	(Italy)	Luigi Datome	32	Fenerbahçe	(Turkey)	3 years	June 2023	Undisclosed	30 June 2020	
31	SF	(Denmark) (United States)	Shavon Shields	26	Baskonia	(Spain)	2 years	June 2022	Free	9 July 2020	
2	F/C	(United States)	Zach LeDay	26	Žalgiris	(Lithuania)	2 years	June 2022	150.000€	13 July 2020	
81	C	(Poland) (Italy)	Jakub Wojciechowski	31	Pallacanestro Biella	(Italy)	End of the season	June 2021	Undisclosed	6 February 2021	
40	F/C	(United States)	Jeremy Evans	33	Khimki	(Russia)	End of the season	June 2021	Free	24 February 2021	

1. In players: Players who signed after the beginning of the season

==== Out ====
No.	Pos.	Nat.	Name	Age	Moving to		Type	Transfer fee	Date	Source
22	SF	(United States)	Drew Crawford	29	Basket Brescia Leonessa	(Italy)	End of EL season	Free	26 May 2020	
00	SG	(Italy)	Amedeo Della Valle	27	Gran Canaria	(Spain)	End of contract	Free	30 May 2020	
23	F/C	(Italy) (United States)	Christian Burns	34	Basket Brescia Leonessa	(Italy)	End of contract	Free	9 June 2020	
16	SG	(Serbia)	Nemanja Nedović	28	Panathinaikos	(Greece)	End of contract	Free	9 June 2020	
40	PF	(Argentina)	Luis Scola	40	Pallacanestro Varese	(Italy)	End of contract	Free	11 June 2020	
28	PG	(United States)	Keifer Sykes	26	Türk Telekom	(Turkey)	End of contract	Free	1 July 2020	
7	C	(Lithuania)	Artūras Gudaitis	27	Zenit Saint Petersburg	(Russia)	Mutual consent	Undisclosed	10 July 2020	

==== Confirmed ====
No.	Pos.	Nat.	Name	Age	Moving from		Type	Ends	Transfer fee	Date	Source
20	PG	(Italy)	Andrea Cinciarini	34	Reggio Emilia	(Italy)	4 + 3 years	June 2022	Free	9 July 2015	
15	C	(United States)	Kaleb Tarczewski	27	Oklahoma City Blue	(United States)	3 + 3 years	June 2023	Free	14 March 2017	
5	SF	(Serbia)	Vladimir Micov	35	Galatasaray	(Turkey)	2 + 2 years	June 2021	Free	10 July 2017	
32	PF	(Italy) (United States)	Jeff Brooks	31	Unicaja Málaga	(Spain)	2 + 1 years	June 2021	Free	25 June 2018	
9	G/F	(Italy)	Riccardo Moraschini	28	New Basket Brindisi	(Italy)	3 years	June 2022	Free	16 July 2019	
19	C	(Italy)	Paul Biligha	29	Reyer Venezia	(Italy)	3 years	June 2022	Free	22 July 2019	
10	G/F	(Tunisia) (United States)	Michael Roll	32	Maccabi Tel Aviv	(Israel)	1+1 years	June 2021	Free	25 July 2019	
13	PG	(Spain)	Sergio Rodríguez	33	CSKA Moscow	(Russia)	3 years	June 2022	Free	30 July 2019	

=== Coach ===
Nat.	Name	Age.	Previous team		Type	Ends	Date	Source
(Italy)	Ettore Messina	60	San Antonio Spurs (assistant)	(United States)	3+2 years	June 2022 + 2024	11 June 2019	

=== Youth team ===
The following players have been called from the youth team and have made their appearance in the championship.

Youngsters
Players

Pos.	No.	Nat.	Name	Ht.	Age
SG	6	(Italy)	Gravaghi, Francesco	1.93 m (6 ft 4 in)	17 – 28 February 2003

=== On loan ===
Pos.	Nat.	Name	Age	Moving from		Moving to		Date	Contract	Ends
SG	(Italy)	Giordano Bortolani	19	Pallacanestro Biella	(Italy)	Brescia Leonessa	(Italy)	1 July 2020	5 years	June 2025

=== Staff and management ===
Team Staff
Coaches
Ettore Messina	Head Coach
Tom Bialaszewski	Coach Assistant
Mario Fioretti	Coach Assistant
Marco Esposito	Coach Assistant
Stefano Bizzozero	Coach Assistant
Performance Team
Roberto Oggioni	Head of Performance Team
Matteo Panichi	Athletic trainer
Giustino Danesi	Athletic trainer
Federico Conti	Athletic trainer
Luca Agnello	Athletic trainer
Alessandro Colombo	Physiotherapist
Claudio Lomma	Physiotherapist
Marco Monzoni	Physiotherapist
Gianluca Clemente	Physiotherapist
Medical Staff
Matteo Acquati	Physician
Ezio Giani	Physician
Michele Ronchi	Physician
Daniele Casalini	Physician
Fabrizio Spataro	Nutritionist
Giulia Baroncini	Nutritionist

Management
Pantaleo Dell'Orco	President of Board of Directors
Ettore Messina	President of Basketball Operations
Christos Stavropoulos	General Manager
Team Management
Alberto Rossini	Head of team management
Filippo Leoni	Team manager
Andrea Colombo	Assistant team manager
Alessandro Barenghi	Equipment manager
Gianluca Solani	Referee officer

== Pre-season and friendlies ==
Torneo City of Cagliari

20 August 2020 1	Banco di Sardegna Sassari (Italy)	82–86	(Italy) AX Armani Exchange Milan	Cagliari
20:30 (CET)	Scoring by quarter: 20-20, 19-23, 22-16, 21-27
Dinamo TV	Pts: Bilan 18	Boxscore	Pts: Delaney 18	Arena: PalaPirastu; Attendance: closed doors Referees: Roberto Begnis, Alessandro Vicino, Denis Quarta

21 August 2020 2	Umana Reyer Venezia (Italy)	78–81(OT)	(Italy) AX Armani Exchange Milan	Cagliari
20:30 (CET)	Scoring by quarter: 15-15, 16-25, 18-15, 23-17, Overtime: 6-9
Dinamo TV	Pts: Bramos 18	Boxscore	Pts: Punter 19	Arena: PalaPirastu; Attendance: closed doors Referees: Roberto Begnis, Alessandro Vicino, Andrea Bongiorni

We're Back Preseason Tour

12 September 2020 semifinals	Alba Berlin (Germany)	57–79	(Italy) AX Armani Exchange Milan	Kaunas
15:00 (CET)	Scoring by quarter: 16-15, 12-23, 14-15, 15-26
EuroLeague TV, Eurosport Player, Magenta TV, LRT televizija	Pts: Siva 14; Rebs: Giffey 7 Asts: Sikma 5 PIR: Siva 13	Boxscore	Pts: Rodríguez 14; Rebs: Shields, Datome 6 Asts: Delaney 6 PIR: LeDay 17	Arena: Žalgirio Arena; Attendance: 1149; Referees: Oļegs Latiševs, Gytis Vilius, Arturas Šukys

13 September 2020 finals	AX Armani Exchange Milan (Italy)	88–70	(Lithuania) Žalgiris Kaunas	Kaunas
18:00 (CET)	Scoring by quarter: 23-13, 23-10, 17-27, 25-20
EuroLeague TV, Eurosport Player, LRT televizija	Pts: Punter 26; Rebs: Hines 7 Asts: Hines 4 PIR: Punter 29	Boxscore	Pts: Walkup 13; Rebs: Lauvergne 8 Asts: Walkup, Jokubaitis 4 PIR: Lauvergne 17	Arena: Žalgirio Arena; Attendance: 2682; Referees: Robert Lottermoser, Oļegs Latiševs, Rain Peerandi

== Competitions ==
=== Overview ===
Competition	First match	Last match	Starting round	Final position	Record							
Competition	First match	Last match	Starting round	Final position	Pld	W	D	L	PF	PA	PD	Win %
Supercup	27 August 2020	20 September 2020	Regular season	Winner	8	8	0	0	727	568	+159	100.00
Italian Basketball Cup	11 February 2021	14 February 2021	Quarter finals	Winner	3	3	0	0	263	176	+87	100.00
Serie A	27 September 2020	11 June 2021	Regular season	Runner-up	38	28	0	10	3,182	2,847	+335	73.68
EuroLeague	2 October 2020	30 May 2021	Regular season	3rd	41	25	0	16	3,297	3,159	+138	60.98
Total					90	64	0	26	7,469	6,750	+719	71.11

Source: Competitions

=== Supercup ===
==== Group stage ====
Table

Pos	Team	Pld	W	L	PF	PA	PD	Qualification
1	AX Armani Exchange Milano	6	6	0	576	433	+143	Advance to Final Four
2	Germani Basket Brescia	6	3	3	499	515	−16	
3	Openjobmetis Varese	6	2	4	500	548	−48	
4	S.Bernardo Cantù	6	1	5	444	523	−79	

Source: LegaBasket Serie A
Rules for classification: All points scored in extra period(s) were not counted in the standings, nor for any tie-break situation.

Results summary

Overall						Home					Away				
Pld	W	L	PF	PA	PD	W	L	PF	PA	PD	W	L	PF	PA	PD
6	6	0	576	433	+143	3	0	273	215	+58	3	0	303	218	+85

Source: Competitive matches

Results by round

Round	1	2	3	4	5	6
Ground	A	A	H	A	H	H
Result	W	W	W	W	W	W
Position	1	1	1	1	1	1

Source: Competitive matches
A = Away; H = Home; W = Win; L = Loss; V = Void

Matches

~~13 September 2020~~ 27 August 2020 6	AX Armani Exchange Milano	101–71	Acqua S.Bernardo Cantù	Assago (Milan)
17:00 (CET)	Scoring by quarter: 26-18, 28-20, 24-16, 23-17
Eurosport Player	Pts: Punter 17; Rebs: Hines, Punter, Tarczewski 5 Asts: Rodríguez 10; PIR: Punter 20	BoxScore	Pts: Kennedy 16; Rebs: Kennedy 12; Asts: Smith 12; PIR: Kennedy 22	Arena: Mediolanum Forum; Attendance: closed doors Referees: Manuel Mazzoni, Denis Quarta, Federico Brindisi

29 August 2020 1	Openjobmetis Varese	77–110	AX Armani Exchange Milano	Varese
18:00 (CET)	Scoring by quarter: 16-32, 25-27, 19-33, 17-18
Eurosport Player	Pts: Scola 21; Rebs: Andersson, Morse 6 Asts: Ruzzier, De Nicolao 3 PIR: Scola 19	BoxScore	Pts: Punter 19; Rebs: LeDay 7 Asts: Delaney, Hines 4 PIR: Punter 25	Arena: Enerxenia Arena; Attendance: closed doors Referees: Alessandro Vicino, Andrea Bongiorni, Martino Galasso

1 September 2020 2	Acqua S.Bernardo Cantù	62–102	AX Armani Exchange Milano	Desio (Monza and Brianza)
19:00 (CET)	Scoring by quarter: 18-24, 13-30, 15-27, 16-21
Eurosport Player	Pts: Johnson 16; Rebs: Kennedy 9 Asts: Thomas 3 PIR: Kennedy 18	Boxscore	Pts: Punter 17; Rebs: LeDay, Tarczewski, Shields 7 Asts: Rodríguez, Cinciarini 5 PIR: LeDay 24	Arena: PalaBancoDesio; Attendance: closed doors Referees: Roberto Begnis, Dario Morelli, Giulio Pepponi

4 September 2020 3	AX Armani Exchange Milano	87–67	Germani Brescia	Assago (Milan)
17:00 (CET)	Scoring by quarter: 24-12, 20-23, 22-18, 15-14
Eurosport Player	Pts: Delaney 25; Rebs: Shields 7 Asts: Rodríguez 6 PIR: Delaney 29	Boxscore	Pts: Chery 18; Rebs: Burns 9 Asts: Vitali, Chery, Crawford, Sacchetti 3 PIR: Chery 15	Arena: Mediolanum Forum; Attendance: closed doors Referees: Gianluca Sardella, Denny Borgioni, Sergio Noce

7 September 2020 4	Germani Brescia	79–91	AX Armani Exchange Milano	Brescia
20:45 (CET)	Scoring by quarter: 23-24, 16-26, 20-15, 20-26
Eurosport Player	Pts: Chery 17; Rebs: Burns 11; Asts: Chery 5 PIR: Burns 20	Boxscore	Pts: Rodríguez 17; Rebs: Hines, Datome 5 Asts: Rodríguez 5 PIR: Rodríguez 18	Arena: PalaLeonessa; Attendance: 700; Referees: Tolga Sahin, Beniamino Manuel Attard, Federico Brindisi

10 September 2020 5	AX Armani Exchange Milano	91–77	Openjobmetis Varese	Assago (Milan)
19:00 (CET)	Scoring by quarter: 19-20, 23-21, 25-18, 24-18
Eurosport Player	Pts: Shields 18; Rebs: Tarczewski 8 Asts: Moraschini 5 PIR: Shields 20	Boxscore	Pts: Douglas 16; Rebs: Scola, Ruzzier 6 Asts: Ruzzier 6 PIR: Andersson 15	Arena: Mediolanum Forum; Referees: Lorenzo Baldini, Valerio Grigioni, Dario Morelli

==== Semifinal ====
18 September 2020 Semifinal	AX Armani Exchange Milano	76–67	Umana Reyer Venezia	Bologna
18:00 (CET)	Scoring by quarter: 26-15, 17-8, 14-23, 19-21
Eurosport 2, Eurosport Player	Pts: Delaney 19; Rebs: Tarczewski 6 Asts: Delaney 6 PIR: Delaney 32	Boxscore	Pts: Watt 19; Rebs: Daye 7 Asts: De Nicolao 8 PIR: Watt 26	Arena: Segafredo Arena; Referees: Saverio Lanzarini, Mark Bartoli, Guido Federico Di Francesco

==== Final ====
20 September 2020 Final	AX Armani Exchange Milano	75–68	Virtus Segafredo Bologna	Bologna
18:00 (CET)	Scoring by quarter: 21-16, 24-17, 8-18, 22-17
Nove, Eurosport 2, Eurosport Player	Pts: Datome 17; Rebs: Datome 6 Asts: Rodríguez 4 PIR: Datome 19	Boxscore	Pts: Alibegović 13; Rebs: Alibegović, Gamble 8 Asts: Teodosić 8 PIR: Gamble 21	Arena: Segafredo Arena; Referees: Carmelo Lo Guzzo, Manuel Mazzoni, Andrea Bongiorni

Starters:			Pts	Reb	Ast
PG	23	(United States) Malcolm Delaney	11	2	1
SG	0	(United States) Kevin Punter	14	3	2
SF	5	(Serbia) Vladimir Micov	2	2	0
PF	32	(Italy) Jeff Brooks	0	3	1
C	42	(United States) Kyle Hines	9	3	1
Reserves:					
SG	3	(Italy) Davide Moretti	0	0	0
SF	9	(Italy) Riccardo Moraschini	5	2	2
PG	13	(Spain) Sergio Rodríguez	9	3	4
PF	15	(United States) Kaleb Tarczewski	6	4	0
C	19	(Italy) Paul Biligha	0	0	0
PG	20	(Italy) Andrea Cinciarini	2	2	0
PF	70	(Italy) Luigi Datome	17	6	1
Head coach:
(Italian Basketball Federation) Ettore Messina

AX Armani Exchange Milano	Virtus Segafredo Bologna

Milano	Statistics	Bologna
16/35 (45.7%)	2 point field goals	21/35 (60.0%)
9/25 (36.0%)	3 point field goals	4/24 (16.7%)
16/24 (66.7%)	Free throws	14/17 (82.4%)
35	Rebounds	38
12	Assists	20
13	Steals	4
10	Turnovers	16
3	Blocks	1

Starters:			Pts	Reb	Ast
PG	44	(Serbia) Miloš Teodosić	6	1	8
SG	9	(Serbia) Stefan Marković	3	1	4
SF	34	(United States) Kyle Weems	5	3	4
PF	11	(Italy) Giampaolo Ricci	4	1	1
C	45	(United States) Julian Gamble	12	8	0
Reserves:					
C	0	(Italy) Amedeo Tessitori	DNP		
SF	3	(Italy) Awudu Abass	12	1	0
PG	6	(Italy) Alessandro Pajola	2	1	2
PF	7	(Bosnia and Herzegovina) Amar Alibegović	13	8	0
SG	14	(United States) Josh Adams	2	1	1
C	32	(United States) Vince Hunter	9	5	0
SF	35	(Serbia) Stefan Nikolić	DNP		
Head coach:
(Basketball Federation of Serbia) Aleksandar Đorđević

Supercup Finals MVP
(United States) Malcolm Delaney
Game rules
Game played under FIBA rules.

2020 Italian Supercup champions
AX Armani Exchange Olimpia Milano
4th title

=== Frecciarossa Final Eight 2021 ===
The Frecciarossa Final Eight 2021 was the 53rd edition of the Italian Basketball Cup and Milano qualified by ending the first half of the season in the first place of the Italian Championship mid-season and gaining the unofficial title of "Winter Champions". The Cup was hosted in the Milan court at the Mediolanum Forum in Assago.

==== Matches ====
11 February 2021 Quarterfinals	AX Armani Exchange Milano	80–52	UNAHOTELS Reggio Emilia	Assago (Milan)
18:00 (CET)	Scoring by quarter: 19-10, 22-12, 18-9, 21-21
Rai Sport, Eurosport	Pts: Punter, LeDay 15; Rebs: Shields 9 Asts: Rodríguez 9 PIR: LeDay 20	Boxscore	Pts: Baldi Rossi 13; Rebs: Diouf 9 Asts: Baldi Rossi 5 PIR: Baldi Rossi 13	Arena: Mediolanum Forum; Referees: Roberto Begnis, Mark Bartoli, Fabrizio Paglialunga

13 February 2021 Semifinal	AX Armani Exchange Milano	96–65	Umana Reyer Venezia	Assago (Milan)
18:00 (CET)	Scoring by quarter: 20-25, 22-13, 30-11, 24-16
Rai Sport, Eurosport	Pts: Rodríguez 22; Rebs: Hines 10; Asts: Rodríguez 9 PIR: Rodríguez 30	Boxscore	Pts: Watt 18; Rebs: Watt 6 Asts: De Nicolao 5 PIR: Watt 20	Arena: Mediolanum Forum

13 February 2021 Final	AX Armani Exchange Milano	87–59	Carpegna Prosciutto Pesaro	Assago (Milan)
18:15	Scoring by quarter: 21-15, 27-6, 26-15, 13-23
Rai Sport, Eurosport	Pts: Datome 15; Rebs: Hines 7 Asts: Rodríguez 8 PIR: Datome 26	Boxscore	Pts: Cain 15; Rebs: Cain 12; Asts: J. Robinson 4 PIR: Cain 21	Arena: Mediolanum Forum; Referees: Tolga Sahin, Roberto Begnis, Guido Giovannetti

Starters:			Pts	Reb	Ast
PG	23	(United States) Malcolm Delaney	10	3	2
SG	0	(United States) Kevin Punter	13	3	2
SF	31	(Denmark) Shavon Shields	9	4	4
PF	2	(United States) Zach LeDay	13	2	0
C	42	(United States) Kyle Hines	5	7	1
Reserves:					
SG	3	(Italy) Davide Moretti	5	1	0
SF	9	(Italy) Riccardo Moraschini	7	4	2
PG	13	(Spain) Sergio Rodríguez	1	1	8
C	19	(Italy) Paul Biligha	7	1	1
PG	20	(Italy) Andrea Cinciarini	2	1	0
PF	70	(Italy) Luigi Datome	15	5	2
C	81	(Poland) Jakub Wojciechowski	0	0	0
Head coach:
(Italian Basketball Federation) Ettore Messina

Milano	Statistics	Pesaro
22/38 (57.9%)	2 point field goals	19/38 (50.0%)
10/22 (45.5%)	3 point field goals	5/25 (20.0%)
13/15 (86.7%)	Free throws	6/11 (54.5%)
38	Rebounds	34
22	Assists	16
9	Steals	4
12	Turnovers	14
1	Blocks	1

Starters:			Pts	Reb	Ast
PG	12	(United States) Justin Robinson	4	2	4
SG	5	(Italy) Ariel Filloy	5	2	2
SF	3	(Estonia) Henri Drell	12	4	0
PF	25	(Hungary) Márkó Filipovity	12	5	0
C	8	(United States) Tyler Cain	15	12	1
Reserves:					
SG	15	(Italy) Matteo Tambone	4	1	3
SF	18	(Italy) Edin Mujakovic	DNP		
SG	22	(United States) Gerald Robinson	0	1	3
C	24	(Italy) Beniamino Basso	DNP		
PF	33	(Italy) Michele Serpilli	0	0	0
C	41	(Italy) Simone Zanotti	2	0	0
SF	82	(Argentina) Carlos Delfino	5	2	3
Head coach:
(Croatian Basketball Federation) Jasmin Repeša

Italian Cup Finals MVP
(Italy) Luigi Datome
Game rules
Game played under FIBA rules.

2021 Italian Cup champions
AX Armani Exchange Olimpia Milano
7th title

=== Serie A Regular Season ===
==== League table ====
Pos	Team	Pld	W	L	PF	PA	PD	Qualification
1	AX Armani Exchange Milano	28	22	6	2385	2099	+286	Qualification to Playoffs
2	Happy Casa Brindisi	28	20	8	2395	2212	+183	Qualification to Playoffs
3	Virtus Segafredo Bologna	28	19	9	2397	2168	+229	Qualification to Playoffs
4	Umana Reyer Venezia	28	19	9	2257	2142	+115	Qualification to Playoffs
5	Banco di Sardegna Sassari	28	18	10	2527	2437	+90	Qualification to Playoffs

Updated to match(es) played on 10 May 2021. Source: LBA

==== Results summary ====
Overall						Home					Away				
Pld	W	L	PF	PA	PD	W	L	PF	PA	PD	W	L	PF	PA	PD
28	22	6	2385	2099	+286	11	3	1240	1069	+171	11	3	1145	1030	+115

Source: Competitive matches

==== Results by round ====
Round	1	2	3	4	5	6	7	8	9	10	11	12	13	14	15	16	17	18	19	20	21	22	23	24	25	26	27	28	29	30
Ground	A	H	A	H	A	H	H	A	H	A	H	H	A	H	A	H	A	H	A	H	A	A	H	A	H	A	A	H	A	H
Result	W	W	W	V	W	W	W	W	W	W	L	W	W	W	W	W	W	L	V	W	L	W	W	L	L	L	W	W	W	W
Position	3	1	1	1	1	1	1	1	1	1	2	1	1	1	1	1	1	1	1	1	1	1	1	1	1	2	2	1	1	1

Source: Competitive matches
A = Away; H = Home; W = Win; L = Loss; V = Void

==== Matches ====
27 September 2020 1	UNAHOTELS Reggio Emilia	71–87	AX Armani Exchange Milano	Casalecchio di Reno (Bologna)
17:10 (CET)	Scoring by quarter: 17-19, 23-25, 13-20, 18-23
Eurosport 2, Eurosport Player	Pts: Bostic 17; Rebs: Johnson 10; Asts: Bostic, Taylor 4 PIR: Bostic 20	Boxscore	Pts: LeDay 17; Rebs: Hines 7 Asts: Rodríguez 9 PIR: LeDay 21	Arena: Unipol Arena; Referees: Carmelo Paternicò, Guido Giovannetti, Dario Morelli

4 October 2020 2	AX Armani Exchange Milano	104–64	De' Longhi Treviso Basket	Assago (Milan)
17:00 (CET)	Scoring by quarter: 24-12, 25-22, 28-12, 27-18
Eurosport Player	Pts: LeDay 25; Rebs: LeDay 12; Asts: Shields 5 PIR: LeDay 36	Boxscore	Pts: Mekowulu 17; Rebs: Akele 9 Asts: Russell 6 PIR: Mekowulu 17	Arena: Mediolanum Forum; Referees: Lorenzo Baldini, Fabrizio Paglialunga, Mauro Belfiore

11 October 2020 3	Allianz Pallacanestro Trieste	65–87	AX Armani Exchange Milano	Trieste
17:00 (CET)	Scoring by quarter: 12-26, 24-19, 9-24, 20-18
Eurosport Player	Pts: Doyle 17; Rebs: Alviti 12; Asts: Fernández 4 PIR: Alviti 19	Boxscore	Pts: LeDay 18; Rebs: LeDay 14; Asts: Shields 4 PIR: LeDay 30	Arena: Allianz Dome; Referees: Alessandro Martolini, Guido Federico Di Francesco, Sergio Noce

18 October 2020^{1} 4	AX Armani Exchange Milano	93–71	Virtus Roma	Assago (Milan)
17:30 (CET)	Scoring by quarter: 25-16, 28-14, 24-17, 16-24
Eurosport Player	Pts: Moretti 15; Rebs: LeDay, Tarczewski, Cinciarini 5 Asts: Shields 7 PIR: Shields 22	Boxscore	Pts: Hunt 14; Rebs: Wilson 5 Asts: Baldasso 6 PIR: Cervi, Hunt 13	Arena: Mediolanum Forum; Referees: Mark Bartoli, Andrea Bongiorni, Federico Brindisi

25 October 2020 5	Fortitudo Lavoropiù Bologna	71–82	AX Armani Exchange Milano	Casalecchio di Reno (Bologna)
17:00 (CET)	Scoring by quarter: 13-20, 29-18, 14-25, 15-19
Eurosport 2, Eurosport Player	Pts: Aradori 24; Rebs: Happ 7 Asts: Banks 7 PIR: Withers 20	Boxscore	Pts: Shields 17; Rebs: Hines 11; Asts: Moraschini 6 PIR: Datome 21	Arena: Unipol Arena; Referees: Tolga Sahin, Denny Borgioni, Marco Pierantozzi

1 November 2020 6	AX Armani Exchange Milano	82–75	Dolomiti Energia Trento	Assago (Milan)
17:30 (CET)	Scoring by quarter: 19-12, 22-32, 19-18, 22-13
Eurosport Player	Pts: Shields 24; Rebs: Tarczewski, Hines 6 Asts: Rodríguez 12; PIR: Shields 30	Boxscore	Pts: Browne 18; Rebs: Williams 15; Asts: Browne 8 PIR: Williams 25	Arena: Mediolanum Forum; Referees: Christian Borgo, Dario Morelli, Alessandro Perciavalle

8 November 2020 7	AX Armani Exchange Milano	87–56	Germani Brescia	Assago (Milan)
17:00 (CET)	Scoring by quarter: 23-9, 21-15, 28-13, 15-19
Eurosport 2, Eurosport Player	Pts: Shields 16; Rebs: Brooks 9 Asts: Rodríguez 7 PIR: LeDay, Brooks 20	Boxscore	Pts: Cline 19; Rebs: Burns 5 Asts: Moss, Sacchetti 2 PIR: Sacchetti 14	Arena: Mediolanum Forum; Referees: Saverio Lanzarini, Alessandro Nicolini, Gianluca Sardella

15 November 2020 8	Acqua S.Bernardo Cantù	71–89	AX Armani Exchange Milano	Desio (Monza)
18:00 (CET)	Scoring by quarter: 24-20, 20-23, 14-30, 13-16
Eurosport 2, Eurosport Player	Pts: Smith 18; Rebs: Leunen 8 Asts: Leunen 5 PIR: Leunen 10	Boxscore	Pts: Rodríguez 24; Rebs: LeDay 12; Asts: Rodríguez 6 PIR: LeDay 25	Arena: PalaBancoDesio; Referees: Roberto Begnis, Giulio Pepponi, Mauro Belfiore

22 November 2020 9	AX Armani Exchange Milano	86–72	Umana Reyer Venezia	Assago (Milan)
16:00 (CET)	Scoring by quarter: 21-25, 23-14, 27-16, 15-17
Eurosport Player	Pts: LeDay 20; Rebs: LeDay 6 Asts: Micov, Roll 3 PIR: LeDay, Delaney 21	Boxscore	Pts: Fotu 25; Rebs: Bramos 7 Asts: Stone 6 PIR: Fotu 25	Arena: Mediolanum Forum; Referees: Alessandro Vicino, Guido Giovannetti, Valerio Grigioni

6 December 2020 10	Openjobmetis Varese	70–96	AX Armani Exchange Milano	Varese
17:30 (CET)	Scoring by quarter: 18-20, 14-35, 18-22, 20-19
Eurosport Player	Pts: Scola 23; Rebs: Strautiņš 8 Asts: Ruzzier 3 PIR: Scola 22	Boxscore	Pts: LeDay 18; Rebs: Tarczewski 9 Asts: Cinciarini 4 PIR: LeDay 28	Arena: Enerxenia Arena; Referees: Michele Rossi, Denny Borgioni, Andrea Valzani

13 December 2020 11	AX Armani Exchange Milano	82–88	Happy Casa Brindisi	Assago (Milan)
17:00 (CET)	Scoring by quarter: 18-21, 22-15, 17-27, 25-25
Eurosport 2, Eurosport Player	Pts: Datome 16; Rebs: LeDay 9 Asts: Shields 8 PIR: LeDay 18	Boxscore+	Pts: Harrison 20; Rebs: Harrison 8 Asts: Harrison 5 PIR: Harrison 34	Arena: Mediolanum Forum; Referees: Carmelo Lo Guzzo, Mark Bartoli, Gianluca Capotorto

20 December 2020 12	AX Armani Exchange Milano	102–86	Banco di Sardegna Sassari	Assago (Milan)
17:00 (CET)	Scoring by quarter: 26-25, 22-22, 24-28, 30-11
Eurosport 2, Eurosport Player	Pts: Datome 24; Rebs: LeDay, Hines 8 Asts: Shields 8 PIR: Datome 26	Boxscore	Pts: Burnell 23; Rebs: Bilan 8 Asts: Spissu 11; PIR: Burnell 31	Arena: Mediolanum Forum; Referees: Saverio Lanzarini, Lorenzo Baldini, Federico Brindisi

27 December 2020 13	Virtus Segafredo Bologna	68–73	AX Armani Exchange Milano	Bologna
17:15 (CET)	Scoring by quarter: 24-23, 14-23, 20-12, 10-15
Rai 2, Eurosport Player	Pts: Hunter, Teodosić, Gamble 12; Rebs: Hunter 8 Asts: Teodosić 6 PIR: Teodosić 18	Boxscore	Pts: Punter 18; Rebs: Hines 13; Asts: Rodríguez 4 PIR: LeDay 22	Arena: Segafredo Arena; Referees: Tolga Sahin, Michele Rossi, Fabrizio Paglialunga

3 January 2021 14	AX Armani Exchange Milano	97–93	Carpegna Prosciutto Pesaro	Assago (Milan)
18:00 (CET)	Scoring by quarter: 21-18, 18-31, 25-23, 33-21
Eurosport Player	Pts: LeDay 24; Rebs: LeDay 7 Asts: Rodríguez 8 PIR: LeDay 31	Boxscore	Pts: Delfino 23; Rebs: Cain 7 Asts: J. Robinson 8 PIR: Cain 21	Arena: Mediolanum Forum; Referees: Mark Bartoli, Andrea Bongiorni, Martino Galasso

19 January 2021^{2} 15	Vanoli Basket Cremona	81–83	AX Armani Exchange Milano	Cremona
17:00 (CET)	Scoring by quarter: 18-24, 17-20, 22-18, 24-21
Eurosport Player	Pts: Hommes 22; Rebs: Lee 8 Asts: Poeta 9 PIR: T.J. Williams, Hommes 18	Boxscore	Pts: Punter 15; Rebs: Tarczewski 12; Asts: Moraschini, Roll 4 PIR: Tarczewski 26	Arena: PalaRadi; Referees: Carmelo Pternicò, Gabriele Bettini, Marco Vita

17 January 2021 16	AX Armani Exchange Milano	102–73	UNAHOTELS Reggio Emilia	Assago (Milan)
12:00 (CET)	Scoring by quarter: 31-18, 31-18, 20-22, 20-15
Eurosport Player	Pts: Rodríguez 18; Rebs: Roll, Brooks 4 Asts: Rodríguez 7 PIR: Rodríguez 26	Boxscore	Pts: Candi 18; Rebs: Elegar 7 Asts: Candi 5 PIR: Candi 20	Arena: Mediolanum Forum; Referees: Alessandro Martolini, Alessandro Nicolini, Sergio Noce

24 January 2021 17	De' Longhi Treviso Basket	77–82	AX Armani Exchange Milano	Villorba (Treviso)
12:00 (CET)	Scoring by quarter: 22-23, 20-22, 23-20, 12-17
Eurosport Player	Pts: Logan 19; Rebs: Mekowulu, Sokołowski 6 Asts: Imbrò 6 PIR: Mekowulu 26	Boxscore	Pts: LeDay 24; Rebs: LeDay 7 Asts: Rodríguez 5 PIR: LeDay 33	Arena: Palaverde; Referees: Saverio Lanzarini, Guido Federico Di Francesco, Gianluca Capotorto

31 January 2021 18	AX Armani Exchange Milano	81–100	Allianz Pallacanestro Trieste	Assago (Milan)
17:00 (CET)	Scoring by quarter: 22-21, 20-26, 20-25, 19-28
Eurosport 2, Eurosport Player	Pts: Hines, Datome 15; Rebs: Tarczewski, Datome 5 Asts: Roll 4 PIR: Hines 17	Boxscore	Pts: Fernández 24; Rebs: Delía 7 Asts: Doyle 9 PIR: Fernández 30	Arena: Mediolanum Forum; Referees: Michele Rossi, Gabriele Bettini, Giacomo Dori

7 February 2021^{1} 19	Virtus Roma	vs.	AX Armani Exchange Milano

28 February 2021 20	AX Armani Exchange Milano	98–72	Fortitudo Lavoropiù Bologna	Assago (Milan)
17:00 (CET)	Scoring by quarter: 30-11, 29-22, 23-21, 16-18
Eurosport 2, Eurosport Player	Pts: Punter 25; Rebs: Datome 5 Asts: Rodríguez 7 PIR: Punter 25	Boxscore	Pts: Hunt 17; Rebs: Saunders, Fantinelli, Baldasso 4 Asts: Baldasso 6 PIR: Baldasso 14	Arena: Mediolanum Forum; Referees: Lorenzo Baldini, Denny Borgioni, Mauro Belfiore

7 March 2021 21	Dolomiti Energia Trentino	61–60	AX Armani Exchange Milano	Trento
17:00 (CET)	Scoring by quarter: 14-14, 16-14, 19-18, 12-14
Eurosport 2, Eurosport Player	Pts: Browne 20; Rebs: Williams 12; Asts: Browne 7 PIR: Browne 24	Boxscore	Pts: Rodríguez 18; Rebs: Tarczewski 8 Asts: Rodríguez 4 PIR: Rodríguez 13	Arena: BLM Group Arena; Referees: Carmelo Paternicò, Alessandro Perciavalle, Gianluca Capotorto

14 March 2021 22	Germani Brescia	92–99	AX Armani Exchange Milano	Brescia
17:30 (CET)	Scoring by quarter: 13-24, 27-23, 25-28, 27-24
Eurosport Player	Pts: Willis 17; Rebs: Burns 5 Asts: Vitali 7 PIR: Moss 18	Boxscore	Pts: Rodríguez 29; Rebs: Brooks 8 Asts: Moraschini 5 PIR: Rodríguez 28	Arena: PalaLeonessa A2A; Referees: Beniamino Manuel Attard, Guido Giovannetti, Martino Galasso

21 March 2021 23	AX Armani Exchange Milano	70–57	Acqua S.Bernardo Cantù	Assago (Milan)
18:00 (CET)	Scoring by quarter: 26-14, 12-14, 15-12, 17-17
Eurosport Player	Pts: Shields, Datome 12; Rebs: Shields 6 Asts: Rodríguez 4 PIR: Moraschini, Brooks 16	Boxscore	Pts: Bayehe 12; Rebs: Pecchia 10; Asts: Pecchia 4 PIR: Thomas 13	Arena: Mediolanum Forum; Referees: Alessandro Martolini, Denis Quarta, Marco Pierantozzi

28 March 2021 24	Umana Reyer Venezia	69–63	AX Armani Exchange Milano	Mestre (Venice)
17:30 (CET)	Scoring by quarter: 13-16, 24-18, 17-16, 15-13
Eurosport 2, Eurosport Player	Pts: Chappell 15; Rebs: Vidmar 7 Asts: De Nicolao, Clark 4 PIR: Chappell 15	Boxscore	Pts: Punter 13; Rebs: Tarczewski 6 Asts: Micov, Cinciarini 3 PIR: Punter 16	Arena: Taliercio; Referees: Carmelo Paternicò, Carmelo Lo Guzzo, Guido Federico Di Francesco

5 April 2021 25	AX Armani Exchange Milano	81–83	Openjobmetis Varese	Assago (Milan)
18:15 (CET)	Scoring by quarter: 18-24, 23-21, 22-24, 18-14
Eurosport 1, Eurosport Player	Pts: Punter, LeDay, Rodríguez 14; Rebs: LeDay, Hines, Wojciechowski 4 Asts: Rodríguez, Hines 4 PIR: Hines 17	Boxscore	Pts: Scola 18; Rebs: Egbunu 9 Asts: Ruzzier 8 PIR: Ruzzier 23	Arena: Mediolanum Forum; Referees: Denny Borgioni, Gabriele Bettini, Marco Vita

11 April 2021 26	Happy Casa Brindisi	80–71	AX Armani Exchange Milano	Brindisi
20:45 (CET)	Scoring by quarter: 22-17, 19-18, 18-15, 21-21
Rai Sport, Eurosport Player	Pts: Willis 17; Rebs: Willis 10; Asts: Zanelli 6 PIR: Willis 20	Boxscore	Pts: Rodríguez 23; Rebs: Tarczewski 7 Asts: Shields 3 PIR: Rodríguez, Shields 15	Arena: PalaPentassuglia; Referees: Michele Rossi, Mark Bartoli, Alessandro Nicolini

14 April 2021 27	Banco di Sardegna Sassari	73–85	AX Armani Exchange Milano	Sassari
20:45 (CET)	Scoring by quarter: 15-19, 18-21, 18-21, 22-24
Rai Sport, Eurosport Player	Pts: Spissu 24; Rebs: Burnell 7 Asts: Burnell, Bendžius 4 PIR: Spissu 25	Boxscore	Pts: LeDay 28; Rebs: LeDay, Micov 6 Asts: Rodríguez 10; PIR: LeDay 33	Arena: PalaSerradimigni; Referees: Carmelo Lo Guzzo, Alessandro Vicino, Giulio Pepponi

17 April 2021 28	AX Armani Exchange Milano	94–84	Virtus Segafredo Bologna	Assago (Milan)
20:15 (CET)	Scoring by quarter: 27-18, 26-21, 17-26, 24-19
Eurosport 2, Eurosport Player	Pts: Shields 35; Rebs: LeDay 8 Asts: Rodríguez 7 PIR: Shields 37	Boxscore	Pts: Alibegović 18; Rebs: Alibegović, Gamble 6 Asts: Belinelli 6 PIR: Belinelli 21	Arena: Mediolanum Forum; Referees: Carmelo Paternicò, Lorenzo Baldini, Guido Giovannetti

25 April 2021 29	Carpegna Prosciutto Pesaro	81–88	AX Armani Exchange Milano	Pesaro
12:00 (CET)	Scoring by quarter: 31-14, 10-22, 20-26, 20-26
Eurosport Player	Pts: Robinson 20; Rebs: Cain 9 Asts: Massenat 8 PIR: Robinson 20	Boxscore	Pts: LeDay 22; Rebs: Biligha 7 Asts: Micov, Cinciarini 3 PIR: LeDay, Shields 23	Arena: Vitrifrigo Arena; Referees: Beniamino Manuel Attard, Gianluca Sardella, Christian Borgo

10 May 2021^{3} 30	AX Armani Exchange Milano	74–66	Vanoli Basket Cremona	Assago (Milan)
20:45 (CET)	Scoring by quarter: 17-17, 22-11, 12-15, 23-23
Rai Sport, Eurosport Player	Pts: Punter 13; Rebs: Brooks 11; Asts: Roll 6 PIR: Tarczewski 21	Boxscore	Pts: J. Williams, Poeta 15; Rebs: Hommes 10; Asts: Poeta 6 PIR: Poeta 20	Arena: Mediolanum Forum; Referees: Mark Bartoli, Gabriele Bettini, Sergio Noce

Notes

1 The match was voided after Virtus Roma withdrawal from the Serie A.
2 The match against Cremona was postponed because the team was stuck in Madrid, after the Euroleague match against Real, due to bad weather.
3 The last match was postoponed from May 2 to May 10: Happy Casa Brindisi had a number of players affected by COVID-19 and all the matches were postponed to ensure that all the games were played simultaneously.

=== Serie A Playoffs ===
==== Quarterfinals ====
13 May 2021 Game 1	AX Armani Exchange Milano	88–62 (Series: 1-0)	Aquila Basket Trento	Assago (Milan)
17:30 (CET)	Scoring by quarter: 26-20, 23-14, 23-17, 26-11
Rai Sport, Eurosport Player	Pts: Shields 16; Rebs: Moraschini, Hines 7 Asts: Rodríguez, Shields, Hines 4 PIR: Hines 23	Boxscore	Pts: Browne 16; Rebs: Williams 6 Asts: Sanders 5 PIR: Browne 17	Arena: Mediolanum Forum; Referees: Manuel Mazzoni, Andrea Bongiorni, Gianluca Capotorto

14 May 2021 Game 2	AX Armani Exchange Milano	93–79 (Series: 2-0)	Aquila Basket Trento	Assago (Milan)
19:00 (CET)	Scoring by quarter: 23-21, 26-14, 24-18, 20-26
Eurosport 2, Eurosport Player	Pts: LeDay 19; Rebs: Biligha 6 Asts: Rodríguez 7 PIR: Moraschini, Rodríguez 21	Boxscore	Pts: Morgan 17; Rebs: Williams 8 Asts: Browne 6 PIR: Browne, Morgan, Williams 18	Arena: Mediolanum Forum; Referees: Roberto Begnis, Lorenzo Baldini, Martino Galasso

16 May 2021 Game 3	Aquila Basket Trento	65–74 (Series: 0-3)	AX Armani Exchange Milano	Trento
20:45 (CET)	Scoring by quarter: 16-20, 13-16, 16-16, 20-22
Eurosport 2, Eurosport Player	Pts: Williams 16; Rebs: Martin, Williams 8 Asts: Sanders 4 PIR: Martin, Williams 17	Boxscore	Pts: Punter 14; Rebs: Moraschini 9 Asts: Rodríguez, Delaney 4 PIR: Moraschini 24	Arena: BLM Group Arena; Referees: Saverio Lanzarini, Mark Bartoli, Christian Borgo

==== Semifinals ====
22 May 2021 Game 1	AX Armani Exchange Milano	81–79 (Series: 1-0)	Umana Reyer Venezia	Assago (Milan)
21:00 (CET)	Scoring by quarter: 20-13, 22-25, 22-17, 17-24
Rai Sport, Eurosport 2	Pts: Shields 25; Rebs: Hines 9 Asts: Hines 4 PIR: Shields 30	Boxscore	Pts: Tonut 18; Rebs: Watt 10; Asts: Daye 3 PIR: Daye, Watt 22	Arena: Mediolanum Forum; Referees: Saverio Lanzarini, Alessandro Vicino, Andrea Bongiorni

24 May 2021 Game 2	AX Armani Exchange Milano	99–65 (Series: 2-0)	Umana Reyer Venezia	Assago (Milan)
20:45 (CET)	Scoring by quarter: 23-7, 31-22, 23-23, 22-13
Rai Sport, Eurosport 2	Pts: Delaney 20; Rebs: Moraschini 7 Asts: Rodríguez 7 PIR: Rodríguez 24	Boxscore	Pts: Watt 15; Rebs: Watt 7 Asts: De Nicolao 3 PIR: Watt 26	Arena: Mediolanum Forum; Referees: Michele Rossi, Guido Giovannetti, Denis Quarta

2 June 2021 Game 3	Umana Reyer Venezia	83–93 (Series: 3-0)	AX Armani Exchange Milano	Mestre (Venice)
21:00 (CET)	Scoring by quarter: 21-21, 17-17, 14-24, 31-31
Rai Sport, Eurosport 2	Pts: Daye 22; Rebs: Stone, Tonut, Daye 5 Asts: Stone, Tonut, De Nicolao 2 PIR: Daye 23	Boxscore	Pts: Punter 19; Rebs: LeDay 7 Asts: Rodríguez, Delaney 5 PIR: Punter, Hines 21	Arena: Taliercio; Referees: Roberto Begnis, Alessandro Martolini, Lorenzo Baldini

==== Finals ====
5 June 2021 Game 1	AX Armani Exchange Milano	77–83 (Series: 0-1)	Segafredo Virtus Bologna	Assago (Milan)
20:45 (CET)	Scoring by quarter: 19-23, 20-25, 14-19, 24-16
Rai Sport, Eurosport 2	Pts: LeDay, Rodríguez 16; Rebs: Hines 10; Asts: LeDay 4 PIR: LeDay 19	Boxscore	Pts: Teodosić 19; Rebs: Marković 6 Asts: Teodosić 7 PIR: Teodosić 18	Arena: Mediolanum Forum; Referees: Tolga Sahin, Carmelo Lo Guzzo, Gu

7 June 2021 Game 2	AX Armani Exchange Milano	72–83 (Series: 0-2)	Segafredo Virtus Bologna	Assago (Milan)
20:45 (CET)	Scoring by quarter: 21-16, 20-24, 18-18, 13-25
Rai Sport, Eurosport 2	Pts: Shields 16; Rebs: Delaney, Datome 6 Asts: Delaney 4 PIR: Delaney 15	Boxscore	Pts: Teodosić 21; Rebs: four players 4 Asts: Teodosić 5 PIR: Teodosić 21	Arena: Mediolanum Forum; Referees: Carmelo Paternicò, Beniamino Manuel Attard, Fabrizio Paglialunga

9 June 2021 Game 3	Segafredo Virtus Bologna	76–58 (Series: 3-0)	AX Armani Exchange Milano	Bologna
20:45 (CET)	Scoring by quarter: 17-16, 20-18, 15-18, 24-6
Rai Sport, Eurosport 2	Pts: Weems 23; Rebs: Weems 10; Asts: Teodosić 6 PIR: Weems 26	Boxscore	Pts: Shields, Datome 14; Rebs: Shields, Datome, Punter 5 Asts: Rodríguez 3 PIR: Shields 12	Arena: Segafredo Arena; Referees: Roberto Begnis, Lorenzo Baldini, Mark Bartoli

11 June 2021 Game 4	Segafredo Virtus Bologna	73–62 (Series: 4-0)	AX Armani Exchange Milano	Bologna
19:00 (CET)	Scoring by quarter: 19-24, 22-19, 14-8, 18-11
Rai Sport, Eurosport 2	Pts: Belinelli 15; Rebs: Pajola, Abass 5 Asts: Teodosić 6 PIR: Pajola 18	Boxscore	Pts: Shields 16; Rebs: Shields 10; Asts: Rodríguez 3 PIR: Shields 28	Arena: Segafredo Arena; Referees: Manuel Mazzoni, Alessandro Martolini, Denny Borgioni

=== EuroLeague Regular Season ===
==== League table ====
Pos	Team	Pld	W	L	PF	PA	PD	Qualification
2	(Russia) CSKA Moscow	34	24	10	2817	2662	+155	Qualification to playoffs
3	(Turkey) Anadolu Efes	34	22	12	2838	2604	+234	Qualification to playoffs
4	(Italy) A|X Armani Exchange Milan	34	21	13	2720	2599	+121	Qualification to playoffs
5	(Germany) Bayern Munich	34	21	13	2633	2599	+34	Qualification to playoffs
6	(Spain) Real Madrid	34	20	14	2667	2593	+74	Qualification to playoffs

Source: EuroLeague
Rules for classification: All points scored in extra period(s) will not be counted in the standings, nor for any tie-break situation.

==== Results summary ====
Overall						Home					Away				
Pld	W	L	PF	PA	PD	W	L	PF	PA	PD	W	L	PF	PA	PD
34	21	13	2720	2599	+121	11	6	1412	1296	+116	10	7	1308	1303	+5

Source: Competitive matches

==== Results by round ====
Round	1	2	3	4	5	6	7	8	9	10	11	12	13	14	15	16	17	18	19	20	21	22	23	24	25	26	27	28	29	30	31	32	33	34
Ground	A	H	A	H	A	H	A	A	H	H	A	H	A	A	A	H	H	A	H	A	H	H	H	A	H	H	H	A	A	H	A	A	A	H
Result	W	W	L	W	L	W	L	W	L	W	W	L	L	W	W	L	L	W	W	W	W	W	W	L	W	W	L	W	W	L	L	W	L	W
Position	9	4	8	5	8	4	7	4	6	8	6	7	9	7	7	8	8	7	7	6	4	4	5	4	4	3	4	4	3	4	4	4	4	4

Source: Competitive matches
A = Away; H = Home; W = Win; L = Loss; P = Postponed

==== Matches ====
Some matches could not be regularly played at the scheduled date due to positivity to SARS-CoV-2 tests from many Euroleague teams. Milano itself was one of the teams where numerous players were affected.

2 October 2020 1	FC Bayern Munich (Germany)	79–81(OT)	(Italy) AX Armani Exchange Milan	Munich
20:30 (CET)	Scoring by quarter: 14-15, 17-17, 24-22, 15-16, Overtime: 9-11
EuroLeague TV, Magenta Sport, Eurosport Player	Pts: Baldwin IV 18; Rebs: Reynolds 11; Asts: Đedović 7 PIR: Reynolds 19	Boxscore	Pts: Delaney 17; Rebs: Brooks 5 Asts: Delaney 8 PIR: Delaney 22	Arena: Audi Dome; Referees: Miguel Ángel Pérez, Sašo Petek, Spiros Gkontas

9 October 2020 2	AX Armani Exchange Milan (Italy)	87–73	(France) LDLC ASVEL Villeurbanne	Assago (Milan)
20:45 (CET)	Scoring by quarter: 20-17, 25-23, 16-14, 26-19
EuroLeague TV, Eurosport 2, RMC Sport 1	Pts: Shields 17; Rebs: LeDay 9 Asts: Delaney 8 PIR: Shields 19	Boxscore	Pts: Noua 12; Rebs: Fall 8 Asts: Diot, Cole 3 PIR: Noua 16	Arena: Mediolanum Forum; Referees: Robert Lottermoser, Sérgio Silva, Eduard Udyanskyy

14 October 2020 3	Olympiacos Piraeus (Greece)	86–75	(Italy) AX Armani Exchange Milan	Piraeus
18:30 (CET)	Scoring by quarter: 18-21, 18-21, 27-16, 23-17
EuroLeague TV, Eurosport 2, Eurosport Player, NOVASPORTS 2HD	Pts: Sloukas 17; Rebs: Martin 8 Asts: Sloukas 11; PIR: Sloukas 28	Boxscore	Pts: Rodríguez 18; Rebs: Tarczewski 6 Asts: Delaney 5 PIR: Rodríguez 20	Arena: Peace and Friendship Stadium; Referees: Miguel Ángel Pérez, Seffi Shemmesh, Hugues Thépénier

16 October 2020 4	AX Armani Exchange Milan (Italy)	78–70	(Spain) Real Madrid	Assago (Milan)
20:45 (CET)	Scoring by quarter: 10-19, 21-23, 23-13, 24-15
EuroLeague TV, Eurosport 2, Eurosport Player, DAZN	Pts: Rodríguez 25; Rebs: Shields 7 Asts: Rodríguez 7 PIR: Rodríguez 37	Boxscore	Pts: Thompkins 15; Rebs: Garuba 11; Asts: Campazzo, Thompkins 3 PIR: Thompkins 16	Arena: Mediolanum Forum; Referees: Damir Javor, Robert Vyklický, Marcin Kowalski

22 February 2021^{1} 5	Zenit St Petersburg (Russia)	79–80	(Italy) AX Armani Exchange Milan	Saint Petersburg
18:00 (CET)	Scoring by quarter: 19-15, 21-23, 14-16, 25-16
EuroLeague TV, Eurosport Player	Pts: Pangos, Gudaitis 16; Rebs: Ponitka 7 Asts: Pangos 10; PIR: Pangos 25	Boxscore	Pts: Punter 16; Rebs: Hines 10; Asts: Rodríguez 5 PIR: Shields 19	Arena: Yubileyny Sports Palace; Referees: Daniel Hierrezuelo, Matej Boltauzer, Elias Koromilas

1 December 2020^{2} 6	AX Armani Exchange Milan (Italy)	75–55	(Germany) Alba Berlin	Assago (Milan)
20:45 (CET)	Scoring by quarter: 19-13, 23-9, 22-19, 11-14
EuroLeague TV, Eurosport Player	Pts: Punter 14; Rebs: Tarczewski 6 Asts: Rodríguez 5 PIR: Punter, Rodríguez 18	Boxscore	Pts: Lô, Siva 11; Rebs: Sikma 9 Asts: Sikma 5 PIR: Sikma 16	Arena: Mediolanum Forum; Referees: Matej Boltauzer, Piotr Pastusiak, Carlos Cortés Rey

6 November 2020 7	Valencia Basket (Spain)	86–81	(Italy) AX Armani Exchange Milan	Valencia
21:00 (CET)	Scoring by quarter: 24-18, 18-26, 24-17, 20-20
EuroLeague TV, Eurosport 2, Eurosport Player, DAZN	Pts: Van Rossom 21; Rebs: Dubljević 7 Asts: Prepelič 5 PIR: Van Rossom 21	Boxscore	Pts: Shields 17; Rebs: Hines 7 Asts: Rodríguez 4 PIR: LeDay 20	Arena: Fuente de San Luis; Referees: Christos Christodoulou, Damir Javor, Robert Lottermoser

8 December 2020^{3} 8	Khimki Moscow Region (Russia)	93–102	(Italy) AX Armani Exchange Milan	Mytishchi
16:30 (CET)	Scoring by quarter: 20-28, 27-26, 21-18, 25-30
EuroLeague TV, Eurosport Player	Pts: Jerebko 20; Rebs: Jerebko 7 Asts: Shved 13; PIR: McCollum 25	Boxscore	Pts: Shields 26; Rebs: Punter, Hines 5 Asts: Delaney 7 PIR: Shields 34	Arena: Mytishchi Arena; Referees: Daniel Hierrezuelo, Mehdi Difallah, Tomislav Hordov

18 November 2020 9	AX Armani Exchange Milan (Italy)	79–87	(Serbia) Crvena Zvezda MTS Belgrade	Assago (Milan)
20:45 (CET)	Scoring by quarter: 23-18, 21-30, 16-18, 19-21
EuroLeague TV, Eurosport Player, Sportklub	Pts: Micov 13; Rebs: Micov, Delaney, Hines 3 Asts: Rodríguez 5 PIR: Micov 14	Boxscore	Pts: Loyd 17; Rebs: Terry 7 Asts: Loyd 5 PIR: Loyd 24	Arena: Mediolanum Forum; Referees: Matej Boltauzer, Joseph Bissang, Petri Mäntylä

20 November 2020 10	AX Armani Exchange Milan (Italy)	98–92	(Lithuania) Žalgiris Kaunas	Assago (Milan)
20:45 (CET)	Scoring by quarter: 21-25, 31-15, 21-24, 25-28
EuroLeague TV, Eurosport Player, LRT	Pts: Punter 22; Rebs: LeDay, Hines 6 Asts: Rodríguez 5 PIR: Punter 29	Boxscore	Pts: Lekavičius 16; Rebs: Rubit 7 Asts: Walkup 88; PIR: Rubit 22	Arena: Mediolanum Forum; Referees: Emilio Pérez Pizarro, Sašo Petek, Sérgio Silva

26 November 2020 11	Maccabi Tel Aviv (Israel)	85–86(OT)	(Italy) AX Armani Exchange Milan	Tel Aviv
20:05 (CET)	Scoring by quarter: 20-18, 15-28, 18-13, 17-11, Overtime: 15-16
EuroLeague TV, Eurosport Player, Sport 5	Pts: Bryant, Wilbekin 17; Rebs: Bryant 9 Asts: Wilbekin 6 PIR: Bryant 25	Boxscore	Pts: Punter 18; Rebs: Shields 11; Asts: Rodríguez 5 PIR: Punter 20	Arena: Menora Mivtachim Arena; Referees: Juan Carlos García González, Damir Javor, Mehdi Difallah

3 December 2020 12	AX Armani Exchange Milan (Italy)	77–80	(Greece) Panathinaikos OPAP Athens	Assago (Milan)
20:45 (CET)	Scoring by quarter: 22-18, 20-12, 18-24, 17-26
EuroLeague TV, Eurosport Player, NOVASPORTS 1HD	Pts: Punter 16; Rebs: LeDay 5 Asts: Delaney 3 PIR: Delaney 16	Boxscore	Pts: Nedović 16; Rebs: White 10; Asts: Mack 5 PIR: Mitoglou 21	Arena: Mediolanum Forum; Referees: Miguel Ángel Pérez, Sreten Radović, Milan Nedović

11 December 2020 13	FC Barcelona (Spain)	87–71	(Italy) AX Armani Exchange Milan	Barcelona
21:00 (CET)	Scoring by quarter: 23-15, 16-28, 21-18, 27-10
EuroLeague TV, Eurosport Player, DAZN	Pts: Davies 21; Rebs: Mirotić 10; Asts: Calathes 14; PIR: Davies, Mirotić 28	Boxscore	Pts: Delaney 23; Rebs: Brooks 6 Asts: Delaney 4 PIR: Delaney 22	Arena: Palau Blaugrana; Referees: Robert Lottermoser, Oļegs Latiševs, Sašo Petek

15 December 2020 14	Fenerbahçe Beko Istanbul (Turkey)	71–79	(Italy) AX Armani Exchange Milan	Istanbul
18:45 (CET)	Scoring by quarter: 25-26, 10-18, 13-24, 23-11
EuroLeague TV, Eurosport Player, beIN Sports	Pts: Pierre 16; Rebs: Düverioğlu 6 Asts: Westermann 4 PIR: Pierre 20	Boxscore	Pts: LeDay 15; Rebs: LeDay 7 Asts: Rodríguez, Delaney 4 PIR: LeDay 20	Arena: Ülker Sports Arena; Referees: Daniel Hierrezuelo, Fernando Rocha, Mario Majkić

17 December 2020 15	Anadolu Efes Istanbul (Turkey)	69–72	(Italy) AX Armani Exchange Milan	Istanbul
18:30 (CET)	Scoring by quarter: 20-20, 11-26, 21-6, 17-20
EuroLeague TV, Eurosport Player, beIN Sports	Pts: Micić 20; Rebs: Micić, Dunston 8 Asts: Micić 5 PIR: Micić 21	Boxscore	Pts: Punter 18; Rebs: Hines 7 Asts: Rodríguez 8 PIR: Punter, Shields 15	Arena: Sinan Erdem Dome; Referees: Sreten Radović, Joseph Bissang, Carlos Peruga

23 December 2020 16	AX Armani Exchange Milan (Italy)	79–84	(Spain) TDS Baskonia	Assago (Milan)
20:45 (CET)	Scoring by quarter: 19-23, 22-22, 16-18, 22-21
EuroLeague TV, Eurosport Player, DAZN	Pts: Punter 15; Rebs: LeDay 8 Asts: Rodríguez 5 PIR: LeDay, Rodríguez 12	Boxscore	Pts: Dragić 16; Rebs: Jekiri 12; Asts: Henry 8 PIR: Jekiri 25	Arena: Mediolanum Forum; Referees: Ilija Belošević, Borys Ryzhyk, Tomislav Hordov

30 December 2020 17	AX Armani Exchange Milan (Italy)	87–91(OT)	(Russia) CSKA Moscow	Assago (Milan)
20:45 (CET)	Scoring by quarter: 17-17, 16-22, 25-20, 22-21, Overtime: 7-11
EuroLeague TV, Eurosport Player, Match! Strana	Pts: LeDay 21; Rebs: Shields 8 Asts: Rodríguez 6 PIR: LeDay 31	Boxscore	Pts: James 20; Rebs: Milutinov 19; Asts: James 11; PIR: Milutinov 30	Arena: Mediolanum Forum; Referees: Juan Carlos García González, Sašo Petek, Milivoje Jovčić

8 January 2021 18	Real Madrid (Spain)	76–80	(Italy) AX Armani Exchange Milan	Madrid
21:00 (CET)	Scoring by quarter: 18-17, 21-22, 10-22, 27-19
EuroLeague TV, Eurosport Player, DAZN	Pts: Carroll 20; Rebs: Thompkins 7 Asts: Alocén 5 PIR: Tavares 27	Boxscore	Pts: Rodríguez 17; Rebs: Moraschini 10; Asts: Delaney 5 PIR: Delaney, Datome 15	Arena: WiZink Center; Referees: Robert Lottermoser, Emin Moğulkoç, Piotr Pastusiak

12 January 2021 19	AX Armani Exchange Milan (Italy)	95–80	(Spain) Valencia Basket	Assago (Milan)
20:45 (CET)	Scoring by quarter: 21-20, 33-16, 22-24, 19-20
EuroLeague TV, Eurosport Player, DAZN	Pts: Datome 27; Rebs: Datome 6 Asts: Moraschini, Roll 4 PIR: Datome 26	Boxscore	Pts: Williams 17; Rebs: Labeyrie 7 Asts: Vives 5 PIR: Williams 17	Arena: Mediolanum Forum; Referees: Matej Boltauzer, Gytis Vilius, Artūras Šukys

14 January 2021 20	Alba Berlin (Germany)	70–84	(Italy) AX Armani Exchange Milan	Berlin
20:00 (CET)	Scoring by quarter: 18-13, 16-29, 22-22, 14-20
EuroLeague TV, Eurosport Player, Magenta Sport	Pts: Lammers 18; Rebs: Thiemann 7 Asts: Granger 6 PIR: Granger 21	Boxscore	Pts: LeDay 16; Rebs: Tarczewski 6 Asts: Rodríguez, Delaney 7 PIR: Hines 17	Arena: Mercedes-Benz Arena; Referees: Christos Christodoulou, Sérgio Silva, Seffi Shemmesh

21 January 2021 21	AX Armani Exchange Milan (Italy)	75–51	(Germany) FC Bayern Munich	Assago (Milan)
20:45 (CET)	Scoring by quarter: 20-10, 22-10, 21-15, 12-16
EuroLeague TV, Eurosport Player, Magenta Sport	Pts: Rodríguez 14; Rebs: LeDay 8 Asts: Delaney 4 PIR: LeDay 19	Boxscore	Pts: Reynolds 12; Rebs: Reynolds 5 Asts: Weiler-Babb, Flaccadori 2 PIR: Reynolds 13	Arena: Mediolanum Forum; Referees: Saša Pukl, Emilio Pérez Pizarro, Uroš Nikolić

26 January 2021 22	AX Armani Exchange Milan (Italy)	90–79	(Greece) Olympiacos Piraeus	Assago (Milan)
20:45 (CET)	Scoring by quarter: 24-19, 20-15, 21-28, 25-17
EuroLeague TV, Eurosport Player, NOVASPORTS 1HD	Pts: Punter 27; Rebs: LeDay 7 Asts: Punter, Delaney 5 PIR: Punter 33	Boxscore	Pts: Vezenkov 18; Rebs: Vezenkov 10; Asts: Sloukas 7 PIR: Vezenkov 10	Arena: Mediolanum Forum; Referees: Borys Ryzhyk, Mehdi Difallah, Anne Panther

28 January 2021 23	AX Armani Exchange Milan (Italy)	82–76	(Russia) Zenit St Petersburg	Assago (Milan)
20:45 (CET)	Scoring by quarter: 16-24, 19-20, 21-15, 26-17
EuroLeague TV, Eurosport Player, Match! Gra	Pts: Punter 14; Rebs: Hines 8 Asts: Hines 3 PIR: Hines 20	Boxscore	Pts: Pangos, Hollins 12; Rebs: Thomas, Ponitka, Gudaitis 5 Asts: Pangos 5 PIR: Ponitka 13	Arena: Mediolanum Forum; Referees: Juan Carlos García González, Robert Lottermoser, Milan Nedović

5 February 2021 24	LDLC ASVEL Villeurbanne (France)	78–69	(Italy) AX Armani Exchange Milan	Villeurbanne (Lyon)
20:45 (CET)	Scoring by quarter: 20-23, 17-17, 15-16, 26-13
EuroLeague TV, Eurosport Player, RMC Sport 2	Pts: Lighty 16; Rebs: Fall 8 Asts: Cole 4 PIR: Lighty 21	Boxscore	Pts: Shields 18; Rebs: Tarczewski 7 Asts: Punter 6 PIR: Shields 19	Arena: Astroballe; Referees: Miguel Ángel Pérez Pérez, Sašo Petek, Tomasz Trawicki

18 February 2021 25	AX Armani Exchange Milan (Italy)	87–68	(Israel) Maccabi Tel Aviv	Assago (Milan)
20:45 (CET)	Scoring by quarter: 21-12, 18-15, 26-21, 22-20
EuroLeague TV, Eurosport Player, 5SPORT	Pts: Punter 15; Rebs: Shields 9 Asts: Rodríguez 9 PIR: Shields 21	Boxscore	Pts: Hunter 16; Rebs: Hunter 9 Asts: Wilbekin 5 PIR: Hunter 25	Arena: Mediolanum Forum; Referees: Oļegs Latiševs, Emilio Pérez Pizarro, Josip Radojković

25 February 2021 26	AX Armani Exchange Milan (Italy)	84–74	(Russia) Khimki Moscow Region	Assago (Milan)
20:45 (CET)	Scoring by quarter: 29-26, 27-17, 14-13, 14-18
EuroLeague TV, Eurosport Player	Pts: Shields 17; Rebs: Hines 10; Asts: Delaney 7 PIR: Shields 24	Boxscore	Pts: Mickey 23; Rebs: Mickey 11; Asts: Zaytsev 5 PIR: Mickey 29	Arena: Mediolanum Forum; Referees: Ilija Belošević, Mehdi Difallah, Tomasz Trawicki

3 March 2021 27	AX Armani Exchange Milan (Italy)	92–100	(Turkey) Fenerbahçe Beko Istanbul	Assago (Milan)
20:45 (CET)	Scoring by quarter: 28-24, 24-26, 17-28, 23-22
EuroLeague TV, Eurosport Player, beIN Sports HD 3	Pts: Punter 20; Rebs: Datome 6 Asts: Shields 5 PIR: Datome 21	Boxscore	Pts: de Colo 20; Rebs: Veselý 10; Asts: Veselý 8 PIR: Veselý 35	Arena: Mediolanum Forum; Referees: Saša Pukl, Carlos Cortés Rey, Joseph Bissang

5 March 2021 28	Žalgiris Kaunas (Lithuania)	64–69	(Italy) AX Armani Exchange Milan	Kaunas
19:00 (CET)	Scoring by quarter: 13-19, 19-15, 13-16, 19-19
EuroLeague TV, Eurosport Player, TV3 Sport	Pts: Grigonis 17; Rebs: Lauvergne 9 Asts: Grigonis 5 PIR: Lauvergne 24	Boxscore	Pts: Shields 23; Rebs: Hines 7 Asts: Punter 4 PIR: Shields 27	Arena: Žalgiris Arena; Referees: Christos Christodoulou (referee), Milan Nedović, Marcin Kowalski

11 March 2021 29	CSKA Moscow (Russia)	76–84	(Italy) AX Armani Exchange Milan	Moscow
18:00 (CET)	Scoring by quarter: 10-30, 24-17, 21-23, 21-14
EuroLeague TV, Eurosport Player, Match! Gra	Pts: James 21; Rebs: Shengelia 10; Asts: James 5 PIR: Shengelia 33	Boxscore	Pts: Punter 32; Rebs: Hines 6 Asts: Rodríguez 6 PIR: Punter 28	Arena: Megasport Arena; Referees: Oļegs Latiševs, Miguel Ángel Pérez Pérez, Tomasz Trawicki

19 March 2021 30	AX Armani Exchange Milan (Italy)	56–72	(Spain) FC Barcelona	Assago (Milan)
20:45 (CET)	Scoring by quarter: 12-15, 17-23, 15-17, 12-17
EuroLeague TV, Eurosport Player, DAZN	Pts: Shields 10; Rebs: Brooks 5 Asts: Rodríguez 5 PIR: Shields 10	Boxscore	Pts: Mirotić 15; Rebs: Oriola 7 Asts: Calathes 11; PIR: Mirotić 22	Arena: Mediolanum Forum; Referees: Ilija Belošević, Damir Javor, Damir Javor

26 March 2021 31	TDS Baskonia (Spain)	86–69	(Italy) AX Armani Exchange Milan	Vitoria-Gasteiz
19:00 (CET)	Scoring by quarter: 10-16, 23-16, 27-13, 26-24
EuroLeague TV, Eurosport Player, DAZN	Pts: Henry 19; Rebs: Polonara 13; Asts: Henry 6 PIR: Polonara 28	Boxscore	Pts: Punter 13; Rebs: Brooks 7 Asts: Rodríguez 6 PIR: Brooks 16	Arena: Fernando Buesa Arena; Referees: Matej Boltauzer, Emin Moğulkoç, Sérgio Silva

30 March 2021 32	Crvena Zvezda mts Belgrade (Serbia)	72–93	(Italy) AX Armani Exchange Milan	Belgrade
19:00 (CET)	Scoring by quarter: 12-22, 24-25, 15-28, 21-18
EuroLeague TV, Eurosport Player, Sportklub	Pts: Loyd 22; Rebs: Davidovac 6 Asts: Loyd 3 PIR: Loyd 23	Boxscore	Pts: Punter 23; Rebs: LeDay 5 Asts: Rodríguez 8 PIR: Punter 23	Arena: Štark Arena; Referees: Robert Lottermoser, Juan Carlos García González, Artem Lavrukhin

1 April 2021 33	Panathinaikos OPAP Athens (Greece)	86–83(OT)	(Italy) AX Armani Exchange Milan	Athens
20:00 (CET)	Scoring by quarter: 15-26, 14-20, 20-13, 21-11, Overtime: 16-13
EuroLeague TV, Eurosport Player, NOVASPORTS 1HD	Pts: Hezonja 17; Rebs: Papagiannis 7 Asts: Mack 4 PIR: Papagiannis 21	Boxscore	Pts: Micov 15; Rebs: Tarczewski 6 Asts: Rodríguez 5 PIR: Micov 20	Arena: OAKA; Referees: Sreten Radović, Fernando Rocha, Saulius Racys

9 April 2021 34	AX Armani Exchange Milan (Italy)	98–75	(Turkey) Anadolu Efes Istanbul	Assago (Milan)
20:45 (CET)	Scoring by quarter: 29-19, 20-20, 29-17, 20-19
EuroLeague TV, Eurosport Player, beIN Sports	Pts: Shields 19; Rebs: Evans 7 Asts: Rodríguez 10; PIR: Shields 20	Boxscore	Pts: Beaubois 15; Rebs: Moerman 5 Asts: Beaubois 5 PIR: Beaubois 21	Arena: Mediolanum Forum; Referees: Miguel Ángel Pérez Pérez, Gytis Vilius, Sébastien Clivaz

Notes
1. Originally the match was scheduled to be played on 22 October 2020 but it was postponed to 11 November due to covid positives in the Zenit Saint Petersburg team. The game was subject to another deferement because Milano had other positive COVID cases that turned out to be false negative. The game was finally set to be played on 22 February 2021.
2. Originally the match was scheduled to be played on 30 October 2020, but it was postoponed to 1 December due to players found positive to COVID in the Alba Berlin Team.
3. Originally the match was scheduled to be played on 13 November 2020 but it was postponed to 8 December due to COVID positive tests in the Milano team.

=== EuroLeague Playoffs ===
==== Quarterfinals ====
20 April 2021 Game 1	AX Armani Exchange Milan (Italy)	79–78 (Series: 1-0)	(Germany) Bayern Munich	Assago (Milan)
20:45 (CET)	Scoring by quarter: 16-18, 11-26, 26-20, 26-14
EuroLeague TV, Eurosport Player, Magenta Sport	Pts: LeDay 17; Rebs: LeDay 7 Asts: Delaney 4 PIR: LeDay 29	Boxscore	Pts: Seeley 23; Rebs: Seeley 6 Asts: Šiško 6 PIR: Seeley 32	Arena: Mediolanum Forum; Referees: Juan Carlos García González, Fernando Rocha, Tomislav Hordov

22 April 2021 Game 2	AX Armani Exchange Milan (Italy)	80–69 (Series: 2-0)	(Germany) Bayern Munich	Assago (Milan)
20:45 (CET)	Scoring by quarter: 26–12, 21–17, 18–24, 15–16
EuroLeague TV, Eurosport Player, Magenta Sport	Pts: Punter 20; Rebs: Hines, LeDay 7 Asts: Rodríguez 4 PIR: Rodríguez 15	Boxscore	Pts: Baldwin 23; Rebs: Lučić 8 Asts: Baldwin 6 PIR: Baldwin 26	Arena: Mediolanum Forum; Referees: Saša Pukl, Oļegs Latiševs, Emin Moğulkoç

28 April 2021 Game 3	Bayern Munich (Germany)	85–79 (Series: 1–2)	(Italy) AX Armani Exchange Milan	Munich
20:45 (CET)	Scoring by quarter: 23–9, 16–26, 25–16, 21–28
EuroLeague TV, Eurosport Player, Magenta Sport	Pts: Lučić 27; Rebs: Johnson 9 Asts: Šiško 8 PIR: Lučić 35	Boxscore	Pts: Delaney 18; Rebs: LeDay 4 Asts: Hines, Roll 3 PIR: Delaney 21	Arena: Audi Dome; Referees: Damir Javor, Mehdi Difallah, Gytis Vilius

30 April 2021 Game 4	Bayern Munich (Germany)	85–82 (Series: 2-2)	(Italy) AX Armani Exchange Milan	Munich
20:45 (CET)	Scoring by quarter: 23-19, 17-31, 23-21, 22-11
EuroLeague TV, Eurosport Player, Magenta Sport	Pts: Baldwin 18; Rebs: Johnson 7 Asts: Baldwin 4 PIR: Lučić, Zipser 18	Boxscore	Pts: Delaney 28; Rebs: Shields, Evans 7 Asts: Shields 5 PIR: Delaney 30	Arena: Audi Dome; Referees: Matej Boltauzer, Juan Carlos García González, Tomislav Hordov

4 May 2021 Game 5	AX Armani Exchange Milan (Italy)	92–89 (Series: 3-2)	(Germany) Bayern Munich	Assago (Milan)
20:45 (CET)	Scoring by quarter: 24-22, 26-18, 22-18, 20-31
EuroLeague TV, Eurosport Player, Magenta Sport	Pts: Shields 34; Rebs: Hines 7 Asts: Rodríguez 7 PIR: Shields 41	Boxscore	Pts: Reynolds 19; Rebs: Reynolds 10; Asts: Baldwin 5 PIR: Reynolds 24	Arena: Mediolanum Forum; Referees: Sreten Radović, Miguel Ángel Pérez Pérez, Gytis Vilius

==== Final Four ====
28 May 2021 Semifinal	FC Barcelona (Spain)	84–82	(Italy) AX Armani Exchange Milan	Cologne (Germany)
21:00 (CET)	Scoring by quarter: 27-24, 24-18, 16-29, 17-11
EuroLeague TV, Eurosport Player, DAZN	Pts: Mirotić 21; Rebs: Mirotić 6 Asts: Calathes 6 PIR: Mirotić 28	Boxscore	Pts: Punter 23; Rebs: Delaney 7 Asts: Delaney 4 PIR: Punter 21	Arena: Lanxess Arena; Referees: Sreten Radović, Matej Boltauzer, Oļegs Latiševs

30 May 2021 Third place	AX Armani Exchange Milan (Italy)	83–73	(Russia) CSKA Moscow	Cologne (Germany)
17:30 (CET)	Scoring by quarter: 20-23, 20-11, 20-23, 23-16
EuroLeague TV, Eurosport Player	Pts: Micov, Rodríguez 14; Rebs: Shields 7 Asts: Rodríguez 6 PIR: Rodríguez 16	Boxscore	Pts: Shengelia 18; Rebs: Shengelia 9 Asts: Ukhov, Shengelia 3 PIR: Shengelia 26	Arena: Lanxess Arena; Referees: Juan Carlos García González, Mehdi Difallah, Uroš Nikolić

== Statistics ==
As of June 9, 2021.

=== Individual statistics Super Cup ===
No.	Player	GC	GP	GS	MPG	2FG%	3FG%	FT%	RPG	APG	SPG	BPG	EF	PPG
0	Kevin Punter	7	7	7	23.3	47.2% (2.4/5.1)	44.4% (2.3/5.1)	80.6% (3.6/4.4)	3.1	2.3	2.0	0.1	17.0	15.3
2	Zach LeDay	4	4	0	21.5	48.4% (3.8/7.8)	0.0% (0.0/0.5)	83.3% (5.0/6.0)	5.8	1.0	0.3	1.0	15.3	12.5
3	Davide Moretti	8	8	0	9.3	50.0% (0.5/1.0)	60.0% (1.1/1.9)	100.0% (0.6/0.6)	0.4	0.0	0.1	0.0	2.6	5.0
5	Vladimir Micov	5	5	4	16.6	38.1% (1.6/4.2)	60.0% (1.2/2.0)	83.3% (1.0/1.2)	2.2	1.4	0.8	0.0	7.4	7.8
6	Francesco Gravaghi^{Y}	1	1	0	5.0	-	0.0% (0.0/1.0)	-	0.0	0.0	0.0	0.0	-1.0	0.0
9	Riccardo Moraschini	7	7	0	18.6	37.5% (0.9/2.3)	33.3% (0.9/2.6)	79.2% (2.7/3.4)	2.0	1.7	0.7	0.0	7.9	7.0
10	Michael Roll	3	3	1	18.7	50.0% (0.7/1.3)	53.3% (2.7/5.0)	50.0% (0.3/0.7)	1.0	2.0	1.7	0.0	10.7	9.7
13	Sergio Rodríguez	6	6	1	18.0	50.0% (1.0/2.0)	35.0% (1.2/3.3)	100.0% (2.5/2.5)	1.0	5.7	1.0	0.0	10.5	8.0
15	Kaleb Tarczewski	6	6	2	14.8	77.3% (2.8/3.7)	-	52.4% (1.8/3.5)	5.7	0.3	0.2	0.8	12.8	7.5
19	Paul Biligha	8	7	0	8.4	63.6% (1.0/1.6)	-	40.0% (0.3/0.7)	1.4	0.3	0.0	0.3	2.4	2.3
20	Andrea Cinciarini	8	7	0	10.7	25.0% (0.1/0.6)	66.7% (0.6/0.9)	87.5% (1.0/1.1)	1.6	1.0	0.4	0.0	3.9	3.0
23	Malcolm Delaney	7	7	7	23.9	43.8% (2.0/4.6)	31.0% (1.3/4.1)	79.4% (3.9/4.9)	2.4	3.1	2.0	0.0	13.6	11.7
31	Shavon Shields	4	4	4	24.0	50.0% (2.8/5.5)	50.0% (1.5/3.0)	60.0% (0.8/1.3)	4.8	2.0	1.0	0.0	13.0	10.8
32	Jeff Brooks	8	8	8	17.9	50.0% (0.4/0.8)	52.9% (1.1/2.1)	100.0% (0.3/0.3)	3.6	1.4	0.8	0.6	7.8	4.4
42	Kyle Hines	6	6	6	22.3	60.5% (3.8/6.3)	-	73.3% (1.8/2.5)	4.0	1.7	1.7	0.7	13.3	9.5
70	Luigi Datome	8	8	0	18.5	55.2% (2.0/3.6)	50.0% (1.3/2.5)	91.7% (1.4/1.5)	2.4	1.0	0.6	0.5	10.1	9.1
Total		8				51.4%	44.8%	78.5%	30.6	18.6	9.9	3.1	109.8	91.8

Notes
^Y Players that come from the youth team

=== Individual statistics Italian Cup ===
No.	Player	GC	GP	GS	MPG	2FG%	3FG%	FT%	RPG	APG	SPG	BPG	EF	PPG
0	Kevin Punter	3	3	3	20.7	71.4% (1.7/2.3)	42.9% (2.0/4.7)	100.0% (0.7/0.7)	1.7	2.3	1.0	0.3	10.0	10.0
2	Zach LeDay	3	3	3	24.7	62.5% (5.0/8.0)	50.0% (1.0/2.0)	83.3% (1.7/2.0)	4.3	0.3	0.0	0.0	15.7	14.7
3	Davide Moretti	3	3	0	6.7	50.0% (0.3/0.7)	33.3% (0.7/2.0)	-	0.7	1.0	0.0	0.0	2.0	2.7
9	Riccardo Moraschini	3	3	1	13.0	60.0% (1.0/1.7)	66.7% (0.7/1.0)	100.0% (0.3/0.3)	2.3	1.0	0.3	0.0	5.0	4.3
13	Sergio Rodríguez	3	3	0	18.3	77.8% (2.3/3.0)	44.4% (1.3/3.0)	33.3% (0.3/1.0)	1.3	8.7	1.3	0.0	16.7	9.0
19	Paul Biligha	3	3	0	15.0	61.5% (2.7/4.3)	-	100.0% (1.0/1.0)	2.3	0.3	0.0	0.3	7.7	6.3
20	Andrea Cinciarini	3	3	0	12.0	60.0% (1.0/1.7)	20.0% (0.3/1.7)	-	1.3	1.0	0.3	0.0	3.7	3.0
23	Malcolm Delaney	3	3	3	21.0	30.0% (1.0/3.3)	42.9% (1.0/2.3)	66.7% (0.7/1.0)	2.7	1.7	2.3	0.0	6.7	5.7
31	Shavon Shields	3	3	2	23.3	60.0% (3.0/5.0)	27.3% (1.0/3.7)	-	5.0	2.3	1.7	0.0	12.7	9.0
42	Kyle Hines	3	3	3	20.0	47.6% (3.3/7.0)	-	87.5% (2.3/2.7)	8.0	1.3	0.7	0.7	13.7	9.0
70	Luigi Datome	3	3	0	16.7	50.0% (1.0/2.0)	55.6% (1.7/3.0)	90.0% (3.0/3.3)	3.3	0.7	1.0	0.7	14.7	10.0
81	Jakub Wojciechowski	3	3	0	8.7	71.4% (1.7/2.3)	0.0% (0.0/0.3)	100.0% (0.7/0.7)	2.3	0.0	0.3	0.0	5.3	4.0
Total		3				58.1%	40.8%	84.2%	35.3	20.7	9.0	2.0	113.7	87.7

=== Individual statistics Serie A ===
No.	Player	GC	GP	GS	MPG	2FG%	3FG%	FT%	RPG	APG	SPG	BPG	EF	PPG
0	Kevin Punter	28	28	22	21.9	43.3% (1.9/4.3)	39.5% (1.7/4.3)	84.4% (2.3/2.8)	1.6	1.4	1.0	0.1	8.9	11.1
2	Zach LeDay	34	34	15	23.8	54.0% (3.8/7.0)	44.6% (1.1/2.4)	89.5% (3.8/4.2)	5.9	1.1	0.5	0.4	18.1	14.6
3	Davide Moretti	27	17	0	8.0	38.9% (0.4/1.1)	26.9% (0.4/1.5)	87.5% (0.4/0.5)	0.6	0.8	0.4	0.0	1.0	2.5
5	Vladimir Micov	17	17	6	18.2	45.5% (1.5/3.2)	26.3% (0.6/2.2)	75.0% (1.6/2.1)	1.7	1.5	0.4	0.0	5.5	6.3
6	Francesco Gravaghi^{Y}	2	1	0	2.0	-	-	-	0.0	0.0	0.0	0.0	0.0	0.0
9	Riccardo Moraschini	36	35	10	16.3	48.1% (1.1/2.3)	39.5% (0.4/1.1)	82.4% (0.8/1.0)	3.0	1.5	0.5	0.0	6.3	4.3
10	Michael Roll	23	23	8	20.5	50.0% (1.5/3.0)	45.0% (2.0/4.3)	94.1% (0.7/0.7)	2.0	1.9	0.7	0.0	8.6	9.5
13	Sergio Rodríguez	32	31	13	21.4	38.4% (1.1/2.8)	45.1% (2.7/5.9)	91.1% (1.3/1.5)	1.7	5.1	0.6	0.1	12.4	11.5
15	Kaleb Tarczewski	20	20	19	17.6	54.9% (2.5/4.6)	-	64.3% (1.4/2.1)	5.6	0.5	0.3	0.7	9.6	6.3
19	Paul Biligha	37	35	0	12.8	54.5% (1.4/2.5)	25.0% (0.0/0.1)	80.6% (0.7/0.9)	2.4	0.3	0.4	0.7	4.2	3.5
20	Andrea Cinciarini	38	30	5	11.4	39.5% (0.5/1.3)	24.1% (0.2/1.0)	80.0% (0.5/0.7)	1.6	1.5	0.8	0.0	3.3	2.2
23	Malcolm Delaney	18	17	17	22.7	36.0% (1.1/2.9)	37.8% (1.0/2.6)	83.6% (3.0/3.6)	2.5	3.1	0.5	0.0	8.3	8.1
31	Shavon Shields	33	33	26	25.7	56.5% (3.5/6.3)	37.0% (1.5/4.1)	83.3% (2.7/3.3)	3.7	2.4	1.0	0.2	16.2	14.4
32	Jeff Brooks	34	33	17	14.8	48.8% (0.6/1.3)	39.5% (0.5/1.2)	86.7% (0.4/0.5)	2.8	0.8	0.6	0.5	5.2	3.0
42	Kyle Hines	23	23	19	22.0	58.5% (3.1/5.3)	0.0% (0.0/0.1)	73.8% (1.3/1.8)	5.5	1.7	1.3	0.7	11.7	7.6
70	Luigi Datome	33	31	13	19.2	43.9% (1.6/3.7)	48.4% (1.5/3.1)	91.5% (1.4/1.5)	3.1	0.9	0.6	0.3	9.1	9.1
81	Jakub Wojciechowski	19	10	0	6.1	75.0% (0.6/0.8)	100.0% (0.1/0.1)	50.0% (0.1/0.2)	1.8	0.2	0.1	0.1	2.7	1.6
Total		38				50.1%	40.7%	83.7%	35.8	17.3	6.9	2.8	98.3	83.7

Notes
^Y Players that come from the youth team

=== Individual statistics Euroleague ===
No.	Player	GC	GP	GS	MPG	2FG%	3FG%	FT%	RPG	APG	SPG	BPG	EF	PPG
0	Kevin Punter	36	36	33	24.7	50.7% (2.9/5.8)	39.2% (1.8/4.6)	89.4% (3.1/3.4)	1.6	1.4	0.8	0.1	11.6	14.3
2	Zach LeDay	36	36	34	24.7	48.6% (2.5/5.1)	46.6% (0.9/2.0)	91.8% (2.2/2.4)	4.5	0.6	0.6	0.3	12.2	10.0
3	Davide Moretti	8	3	0	2.0	-	0.0% (0.0/0.3)	100.0% (0.7/0.7)	0.0	0.0	0.0	0.0	0.7	0.7
5	Vladimir Micov	30	30	20	19.1	50.0% (1.7/3.3)	45.8% (0.7/1.6)	75.0% (0.6/0.8)	1.6	1.0	0.6	0.1	5.4	6.1
9	Riccardo Moraschini	29	24	6	11.0	41.4% (0.5/1.2)	52.4% (0.5/0.9)	64.3% (0.8/1.2)	1.6	1.1	0.4	0.0	3.7	3.1
10	Michael Roll	39	36	10	14.3	46.6% (0.8/1.6)	43.5% (0.8/1.9)	88.9% (0.2/0.3)	1.3	1.2	0.4	0.1	3.6	4.2
13	Sergio Rodríguez	37	37	3	19.9	60.0% (1.7/2.8)	35.4% (1.7/4.7)	90.6% (1.3/1.4)	2.0	4.5	0.8	0.1	10.8	9.7
15	Kaleb Tarczewski	41	39	24	13.4	57.9% (1.6/2.7)	-	66.0% (0.8/1.2)	2.9	0.3	0.3	0.4	4.6	4.0
19	Paul Biligha	20	7	0	3.4	25.0% (0.1/0.6)	-	100.0% (0.6/0.6)	1.3	0.0	0.1	0.3	1.7	0.9
20	Andrea Cinciarini	23	8	0	2.4	-	0.0% (0.0/0.3)	-	0.3	0.3	0.0	0.0	-0.4	0.0
23	Malcolm Delaney	32	32	31	24.9	42.1% (1.8/4.4)	38.8% (1.6/4.2)	81.4% (3.0/3.7)	2.6	3.5	0.9	0.0	11.5	11.6
31	Shavon Shields	36	36	17	26.8	55.5% (3.5/6.3)	43.2% (1.5/3.5)	83.8% (2.3/2.8)	4.0	1.4	1.1	0.2	15.0	13.8
32	Jeff Brooks	33	32	2	12.6	42.4% (0.4/1.0)	38.5% (0.3/0.8)	69.2% (0.3/0.4)	2.2	0.7	0.2	0.4	3.2	2.1
40	Jeremy Evans	13	11	1	10.4	66.7% (1.1/1.6)	25.0% (0.1/0.4)	50.0% (0.4/0.7)	3.1	0.0	0.3	0.2	3.7	2.8
42	Kyle Hines	40	40	17	24.3	55.2% (3.3/6.0)	0.0% (0.0/0.0)	65.2% (1.1/1.7)	4.4	2.0	0.8	0.8	10.0	7.7
70	Luigi Datome	37	37	7	16.5	45.8% (1.2/2.6)	51.1% (1.2/2.4)	89.7% (0.9/1.1)	2.8	0.8	0.2	0.1	6.4	7.1
Total		41				51.5%	41.4%	81.7%	31.4	15.7	6.1	2.2	88.2	81.6

=== Season individual statistics ===
No.	Player	GC	GP	GS	MPG	2FG%	3FG%	FT%	RPG	APG	SPG	BPG	EF	PPG
0	Kevin Punter	74	74	65	23.3	48.4% (2.4/5.0)	40.0% (1.8/4.5)	86.7% (2.7/3.1)	1.8	1.5	1.0	0.1	11.0	13.0
2	Zach LeDay	77	77	52	24.1	52.0% (3.2/6.2)	45.1% (1.0/2.1)	89.5% (3.0/3.4)	5.2	0.8	0.5	0.4	15.1	12.3
3	Davide Moretti	46	31	0	7.6	42.9% (0.4/0.9)	37.5% (0.6/1.5)	93.3% (0.5/0.5)	0.5	0.5	0.2	0.0	1.5	3.0
5	Vladimir Micov	52	52	30	18.6	47.2% (1.6/3.4)	39.6% (0.7/1.8)	75.8% (1.0/1.3)	1.7	1.2	0.6	0.0	5.6	6.3
6	Francesco Gravaghi^{Y}	3	2	0	3.5	-	0.0% (0.0/0.5)	-	0.0	0.0	0.0	0.0	-0.5	0.0
9	Riccardo Moraschini	75	69	17	14.6	45.8% (0.9/1.9)	42.5% (0.5/1.2)	75.9% (1.0/1.3)	2.4	1.3	0.5	0.0	5.5	4.2
10	Michael Roll	65	62	19	16.8	48.5% (1.0/2.1)	45.1% (1.3/3.0)	89.3% (0.4/0.5)	1.5	1.5	0.6	0.0	5.8	6.5
13	Sergio Rodríguez	78	77	17	20.3	51.4% (1.4/2.8)	40.2% (2.0/5.0)	90.5% (1.4/1.5)	1.8	5.0	0.8	0.1	11.6	10.3
15	Kaleb Tarczewski	67	65	45	14.8	58.6% (2.0/3.4)	-	62.7% (1.1/1.7)	4.0	0.4	0.3	0.5	6.9	5.0
19	Paul Biligha	68	52	0	11.1	55.2% (1.2/2.2)	25.0% (0.0/0.1)	79.1% (0.7/0.8)	2.1	0.3	0.3	0.6	3.8	3.2
20	Andrea Cinciarini	72	48	5	9.8	40.4% (0.4/1.0)	28.6% (0.3/0.9)	82.1% (0.5/0.6)	1.4	1.2	0.6	0.0	2.8	2.0
23	Malcolm Delaney	60	59	58	24.0	40.5% (1.6/3.9)	37.7% (1.4/3.6)	81.5% (3.0/3.7)	2.6	3.2	1.0	0.0	10.6	10.3
31	Shavon Shields	76	76	49	26.0	55.8% (3.5/6.2)	39.9% (1.5/3.7)	83.0% (2.3/2.8)	3.9	1.9	1.1	0.2	15.3	13.7
32	Jeff Brooks	75	73	27	14.2	46.3% (0.5/1.1)	42.0% (0.5/1.1)	80.0% (0.3/0.4)	2.6	0.8	0.4	0.5	4.6	2.8
40	Jeremy Evans	13	11	1	10.4	66.7% (1.1/1.6)	25.0% (0.1/0.4)	50.0% (0.4/0.7)	3.1	0.0	0.3	0.2	3.7	2.8
42	Kyle Hines	72	72	45	23.2	56.3% (3.3/5.8)	0.0% (0.0/0.0)	70.1% (1.3/1.9)	4.9	1.8	1.0	0.7	11.0	7.9
70	Luigi Datome	81	79	20	17.7	46.1% (1.4/3.1)	50.0% (1.4/2.7)	90.7% (1.2/1.4)	2.9	0.8	0.4	0.2	8.2	8.2
81	Jakub Wojciechowski	22	13	0	6.7	73.3% (0.8/1.2)	50.0% (0.1/0.2)	75.0% (0.2/0.3)	1.9	0.2	0.2	0.1	3.3	2.2
Total		90				51.1%	41.4%	82.2%	33.3	16.8	6.9	2.5	95.2	83.6

Notes
^Y Players that come from the youth team

=== Individual game highs ===
	Total	Player	Opponent
Points	35	Shavon Shields	vs (Italy) V.Bologna (17 April)
Total Rebounds	14	Zach LeDay	@ (Italy) Trieste (11 Oct.)
Assists	12	Sergio Rodríguez	vs (Italy) Trento (1 Nov.)
Blocks	3	Jeff Brooks	@ (Italy) Trieste (11 Oct.)
Blocks	3	Jeff Brooks	@ (Italy) Brescia (14 March)
Blocks	3	Kyle Hines	@ (Turkey) Efes (17 Dec.)
Blocks	3	Kyle Hines	vs (Russia) CSKA^{OT} (30 Dec.)
Blocks	3	Kyle Hines	@ (Russia) CSKA (11 March)
Blocks	3	Kyle Hines	vs (Russia) CSKA (30 May.)
Steals	5	Kyle Hines	vs (Italy) Varese (5 Apr.)
Efficiency	41	Shavon Shields	vs (Germany) B.Munich (4 May)
2-point field goal percentage^{5}	100% (8/8)	Zach LeDay	@ (Italy) Treviso (24 Jan.)
3-point field goal percentage	100% (4/4)	Kevin Punter	@ (Italy) Varese (6 Dec.)
3-point field goal percentage	100% (4/4)	Kevin Punter	@ (Turkey) Efes (17 Dec.)
3-point field goal percentage	100% (4/4)	Michael Roll	vs (Italy) F.Bologna (28 Febr.)
Free throw percentage	100% (12/12)	Zach LeDay	vs (Russia) CSKA^{OT} (30 Dec.)
Turnovers	7	Zach LeDay	@ (Italy) Varese (29 Aug.)
Minutes	37	Shavon Shields	@ (Germany) B.Munich^{OT} (2 Oct.)

Notes

- ^5 at least 5 attempts
- ^OT match ended in overtime

	Total	Player	Opponent
2-point field goals made	8	Zach LeDay	vs (Italy) Treviso (4 Oct.)
2-point field goals made	8	Zach LeDay	vs (Italy) Venezia (22 Nov.)
2-point field goals made	8	Zach LeDay	@ (Italy) Treviso (24 Jan.)
2-point field goals made	8	Shavon Shields	vs (Italy) Trento (1 Nov.)
2-point field goals made	8	Shavon Shields	vs (Turkey) Efes (9 Apr.)
2-point field goals attempted	13	Zach LeDay	vs (Italy) Treviso (4 Oct.)
2-point field goals attempted	13	Zach LeDay	vs (Italy) Venezia (22 Nov.)
3-point field goals made	8	Sergio Rodríguez	@ (Italy) Cantù (15 Nov.)
3-point field goals attempted	12	Sergio Rodríguez	vs (Italy) V.Bologna (5 June)
Free throws made	12	Zach LeDay	vs (Russia) CSKA^{OT} (30 Dec.)
Free throws attempted	12	Riccardo Moraschini	@ (Italy) Varese (29 Aug.)
Free throws attempted	12	Malcolm Delaney	vs (Italy) Brescia (4 Sept.)
Free throws attempted	12	Zach LeDay	vs (Russia) CSKA^{OT} (30 Dec.)
Free throws attempted	12	Zach LeDay	@ (Italy) Pesaro (25 Apr.)
Free throws attempted	12	Shavon Shields	@ (Germany) B.Munich (30 Apr.)
Free throws attempted	12	Shavon Shields	vs (Germany) B.Munich (4 May)
Offensive Rebounds	7	Kaleb Tarczewski	@ (Italy) Cremona (19 Jan.)
Defensive Rebounds	12	Zach LeDay	@ (Italy) Trieste (11 Oct.)

=== Team game highs ===
Statistic	Total	Opponent
Points	110	@ (Italy) Varese (29 Aug.)
Total Rebounds	49	vs (Italy) Cremona (10 May)
Assists	29	vs (Italy) Sassari (20 Dec.) vs (Italy) F.Bologna (28 Febr.)
Blocks	7	vs (Italy) Brescia (8 Nov.) vs (Russia) CSKA (30 May.)
Steals	14	vs (Italy) Venezia (18 Sept.) vs (Italy) R.Emilia (17 Jan.)
Efficiency	142	@ (Italy) Varese (29 Aug.)
2-point field goal percentage	75.0% (24/32)	vs (Israel) Maccabi (18 Febr.)
3-point field goal percentage	68.4% (13/19)	@ (Russia) Khimki (8 Dec.)
Free throw percentage	100% (20/20)	vs (Spain) Barcelona (19 March)
Turnovers	5	vs (Italy) Cantù (27 Aug.) @ (France) ASVEL (5 Feb.)

Notes

- ^OT match ended in overtime

Statistic	Total	Opponent
2-point field goals made	30	vs (Italy) R.Emilia (17 Jan.)
2-point field goals attempted	52	@ (Italy) Trieste (11 Oct.)
3-point field goals made	21	vs (Italy) F.Bologna (28 Febr.)
3-point field goals attempted	33	@ (Italy) Trento (7 March) @ (Greece) Panathinaikos (1 Apr.)
Free throws made	29	vs (Italy) V.Bologna (5 June) @ (Italy) Varese (29 Aug.)
Free throws attempted	37	vs (Italy) Venezia (18 Sept.)
Offensive Rebounds	19	@ (Italy) F.Bologna (25 Oct.)
Defensive Rebounds	38	vs (Italy) Cremona (10 May)

== See also ==
- 2020–21 LBA season
- 2020–21 EuroLeague
- 2021 Italian Basketball Cup
- 2020 Italian Basketball Supercup
