= 2021 EuroLeague Playoffs =

Postseason playoffs of the EuroLeague basketball tournament

The 2021 EuroLeague Playoffs, known as the 2021 Turkish Airlines EuroLeague Playoffs for sponsorship purposes, was the first postseason portion of the 2020–21 EuroLeague basketball competition. They began on 20 April 2021 and were scheduled to be played through 5 May 2022. The top eight finishers in the regular season qualified for the playoffs, which consists of four series of two teams each, played in a best-of-five format. The winners of each of the playoffs series advanced to the Final Four, which determined the EuroLeague champion for the 2020–21 season.

== Format ==
In the playoffs, series are best-of-five, so the first team to win three games wins the series. A 2–2–1 format will be used – the team with home-court advantage will play games 1, 2 and 5 at home while their opponents will host games 3 and 4. Games 4 and 5 will only be played when necessary.

== Qualified teams ==
Pos	Team	Pld	W	L	PF	PA	PD	Seeding
1	(Spain) Barcelona	34	24	10	2706	2469	+237	Higher seed in playoffs series
2	(Russia) CSKA Moscow	34	24	10	2817	2662	+155	Higher seed in playoffs series
3	(Turkey) Anadolu Efes	34	22	12	2838	2604	+234	Higher seed in playoffs series
4	(Italy) A|X Armani Exchange Milan	34	21	13	2720	2599	+121	Higher seed in playoffs series
5	(Germany) Bayern Munich	34	21	13	2633	2599	+34	Lower seed in playoffs series
6	(Spain) Real Madrid	34	20	14	2667	2593	+74	Lower seed in playoffs series
7	(Turkey) Fenerbahçe Beko	34	20	14	2661	2679	−18	Lower seed in playoffs series
8	(Russia) Zenit Saint Petersburg	34	20	14	2670	2547	+123	Lower seed in playoffs series

Source: EuroLeague

=== Tiebreakers ===
When more than two teams are tied, the ranking will be established taking into account the victories obtained in the games played only among them. Should the tie persist among some, but not all, of the teams, the ranking of the teams still tied will be determined by again taking into account the victories in the games played only among them, and repeating this same procedure until the tie is entirely resolved. If a tie persists, the ranking will be determined by the goal difference in favour and against in the games played only among the teams still tied.

== Series ==
Team 1	Series	Team 2	Game 1	Game 2	Game 3	Game 4	Game 5
Barcelona (Spain)	3–2	(Russia) Zenit Saint Petersburg	74–76	81–78 (OT)	78–70	61–74	79–53
CSKA Moscow (Russia)	3–0	(Turkey) Fenerbahçe Beko	92–76	78–67	85–68	—	—
Anadolu Efes (Turkey)	3–2	(Spain) Real Madrid	90–63	91–68	76–80	76–82	88–83
A|X Armani Exchange Milan (Italy)	3–2	(Germany) Bayern Munich	[[#A|X Armani Exchange Milan vs. Bayern Munich|79–78]]	[[#A|X Armani Exchange Milan vs. Bayern Munich|80–69]]	79–85	82–85	[[#A|X Armani Exchange Milan vs. Bayern Munich|92–89]]

=== Barcelona vs. Zenit Saint Petersburg ===
21 April 2021 Game 1	Barcelona (Spain)	74–76 (Series: 0–1)	(Russia) Zenit Saint Petersburg	Barcelona
21:00 (CET)	Scoring by quarter: 21–21, 13–27, 20–13, 20–15
	Pts: Davies 18; Rebs: Davies 9 Asts: Higgins 6 PIR: Davies 25	Boxscore	Pts: Pangos 19; Rebs: Black 6 Asts: Pangos 9 PIR: Pangos 33	Arena: Palau Blaugrana; Attendance: 0 Referees: Robert Lottermoser, Emin Moğulkoç, Milan Nedović

23 April 2021 Game 2	Barcelona (Spain)	81–78(OT) (Series: 1–1)	(Russia) Zenit Saint Petersburg	Barcelona
21:00 (CET)	Scoring by quarter: 13–16, 25–13, 10–19, 18–18, Overtime: 15–12
	Pts: Davies 22; Rebs: Davies 8 Asts: Calathes 4 PIR: Davies 33	Boxscore	Pts: Pangos 23; Rebs: Black 7 Asts: Pangos, Rivers 3 PIR: Pangos 19	Arena: Palau Blaugrana; Attendance: 0 Referees: Luigi Lamonica, Damir Javor, Anne Panther

28 April 2021 Game 3	Zenit Saint Petersburg (Russia)	70–78 (Series: 1–2)	(Spain) Barcelona	Saint Petersburg
19:00 (CET)	Scoring by quarter: 16–16, 17–18, 18–21, 19–23
	Pts: Baron 19; Rebs: Thomas 9 Asts: Pangos 6 PIR: Thomas 21	Boxscore	Pts: Davies 22; Rebs: Davies 8 Asts: Calathes 6 PIR: Davies 28	Arena: Yubileyny Sports Palace; Attendance: 5,187; Referees: Matej Boltauzer, Tomislav Hordov, Uroš Nikolić

30 April 2021 Game 4	Zenit Saint Petersburg (Russia)	74–61 (Series: 2–2)	(Spain) Barcelona	Saint Petersburg
19:00 (CET)	Scoring by quarter: 25–13, 11–13, 22–12, 16–23
	Pts: Pangos 22; Rebs: Thomas 9 Asts: Pangos 8 PIR: Pangos 23	Boxscore	Pts: Calathes 19; Rebs: Mirotić 6 Asts: Higgins 4 PIR: Higgins 19	Arena: Yubileyny Sports Palace; Attendance: 4,626; Referees: Saša Pukl, Fernando Rocha, Mehdi Difallah

4 May 2021 Game 5	Barcelona (Spain)	79–53 (Series: 3–2)	(Russia) Zenit Saint Petersburg	Barcelona
21:00 (CET)	Scoring by quarter: 23–14, 20–16, 14–9, 22–14
	Pts: Higgins 15; Rebs: Davies 8 Asts: Calathes 5 PIR: Gasol 16	Boxscore	Pts: Poythress 11; Rebs: Poythress, Black 5 Asts: Pangos 10; PIR: Thomas 14	Arena: Palau Blaugrana; Attendance: 0 Referees: Robert Lottermoser, Oļegs Latiševs, Tomislav Hordov

=== CSKA Moscow vs. Fenerbahçe Beko ===
21 April 2021 Game 1	CSKA Moscow (Russia)	92–76 (Series: 1–0)	(Turkey) Fenerbahçe Beko	Moscow
19:00 (CET)	Scoring by quarter: 28–23, 25–21, 11–22, 28–10
	Pts: Hackett, Clyburn 20; Rebs: Voigtmann 10; Asts: Clyburn 5 PIR: Clyburn 25	Boxscore	Pts: de Colo 27; Rebs: O'Quinn 6 Asts: Barthel 5 PIR: de Colo 27	Arena: Megasport Arena; Attendance: 4,049; Referees: Luigi Lamonica, Oļegs Latiševs, Gytis Vilius

23 April 2021 Game 2	CSKA Moscow (Russia)	78–67 (Series: 2–0)	(Turkey) Fenerbahçe Beko	Moscow
19:00 (CET)	Scoring by quarter: 23–25, 27–17, 10–13, 18–12
	Pts: Hackett 14; Rebs: Shengelia 7 Asts: Hackett 9 PIR: Hackett 26	Boxscore	Pts: Gudurić 27; Rebs: Brown 5 Asts: Gudurić 3 PIR: Gudurić 27	Arena: Megasport Arena; Attendance: 5,128; Referees: Miguel Ángel Pérez, Milan Nedović, Uroš Nikolić

28 April 2021 Game 3	Fenerbahçe Beko (Turkey)	68–85 (Series: 0–3)	(Russia) CSKA Moscow	Istanbul
19:45 (CET)	Scoring by quarter: 24–17, 15–27, 11–27, 18–14
	Pts: de Colo 22; Rebs: Biberovic 7 Asts: Düverioğlu, de Colo 3 PIR: de Colo 19	Boxscore	Pts: Clyburn 34; Rebs: Clyburn, Lundberg 7 Asts: Lundberg 5 PIR: Clyburn 38	Arena: Ülker Sports and Event Hall; Attendance: 350; Referees: Robert Lottermoser, Saša Pukl, Tomasz Trawicki

=== Anadolu Efes vs. Real Madrid ===
20 April 2021 Game 1	Anadolu Efes (Turkey)	90–63 (Series: 1–0)	(Spain) Real Madrid	Istanbul
19:00 (CET)	Scoring by quarter: 20–18, 24–22, 20–10, 26–13
	Pts: Beaubois 19; Rebs: Şanlı 8 Asts: Simon 6 PIR: Şanlı 19	Boxscore	Pts: Thompkins 13; Rebs: Tavares 9 Asts: Laprovíttola 4 PIR: Laprovíttola, Thompkins 13	Arena: Sinan Erdem Dome; Attendance: 0 Referees: Sreten Radović, Saša Pukl, Tomasz Trawicki

22 April 2021 Game 2	Anadolu Efes (Turkey)	91–68 (Series: 2–0)	(Spain) Real Madrid	Istanbul
19:00 (CET)	Scoring by quarter: 22–13, 22–19, 21–13, 26–23
	Pts: Micić 23; Rebs: three players 4 Asts: Beaubois 6 PIR: Micić 26	Boxscore	Pts: Thompkins 17; Rebs: Garuba 6 Asts: Laprovíttola 10; PIR: Laprovíttola, Garuba 16	Arena: Sinan Erdem Dome; Attendance: 0 Referees: Matej Boltauzer, Mehdi Difallah, Saulius Račys

27 April 2021 Game 3	Real Madrid (Spain)	80–76 (Series: 1–2)	(Turkey) Anadolu Efes	Madrid
21:00 (CET)	Scoring by quarter: 15–15, 13–23, 20–20, 32–18
	Pts: Llull 20; Rebs: Garuba 9 Asts: Llull 7 PIR: Llull 22	Boxscore	Pts: Micić 29; Rebs: Dunston 7 Asts: Micić 6 PIR: Micić 34	Arena: WiZink Center; Attendance: 0 Referees: Luigi Lamonica, Fernando Rocha, Anne Panther

29 April 2021 Game 4	Real Madrid (Spain)	82–76 (Series: 2–2)	(Turkey) Anadolu Efes	Madrid
21:00 (CET)	Scoring by quarter: 19–13, 17–34, 21–19, 25–10
	Pts: Garuba 24; Rebs: Garuba 12; Asts: Llull 8 PIR: Garuba 30	Boxscore	Pts: Beaubois 23; Rebs: Dunston, Singleton 6 Asts: Larkin 8 PIR: Larkin 31	Arena: WiZink Center; Attendance: 0 Referees: Sreten Radović, Oļegs Latiševs, Milan Nedović

4 May 2021 Game 5	Anadolu Efes (Turkey)	88–83 (Series: 3–2)	(Spain) Real Madrid	Istanbul
18:45 (CET)	Scoring by quarter: 18–21, 18–20, 24–16, 28–26
	Pts: Singleton 26; Rebs: Singleton 8 Asts: Micić 5 PIR: Singleton 38	Boxscore	Pts: Laprovíttola 17; Rebs: Garuba, Tavares 7 Asts: Laprovíttola, Abalde 4 PIR: Laprovíttola 20	Arena: Sinan Erdem Dome; Attendance: 0 Referees: Matej Boltauzer, Fernando Rocha, Uroš Nikolić

=== A|X Armani Exchange Milan vs. Bayern Munich ===
20 April 2021 Game 1	A|X Armani Exchange Milan (Italy)	79–78 (Series: 1–0)	(Germany) Bayern Munich	Milan
20:45 (CET)	Scoring by quarter: 16–18, 11–26, 26–20, 26–14
	Pts: LeDay 17; Rebs: LeDay 7 Asts: Delaney 4 PIR: LeDay 29	Boxscore	Pts: Seeley 23; Rebs: Seeley 6 Asts: Šiško 6 PIR: Seeley 32	Arena: Mediolanum Forum; Attendance: 0 Referees: Juan Carlos García, Fernando Rocha, Tomislav Hordov

22 April 2021 Game 2	A|X Armani Exchange Milan (Italy)	80–69 (Series: 2–0)	(Germany) Bayern Munich	Milan
20:45 (CET)	Scoring by quarter: 26–12, 21–17, 18–24, 15–16
	Pts: Punter 20; Rebs: Hines, LeDay 7 Asts: Rodríguez 4 PIR: Rodríguez 15	Boxscore	Pts: Baldwin 23; Rebs: Lučić 8 Asts: Baldwin 6 PIR: Baldwin 26	Arena: Mediolanum Forum; Attendance: 0 Referees: Saša Pukl, Oļegs Latiševs, Emin Moğulkoç

28 April 2021 Game 3	Bayern Munich (Germany)	85–79 (Series: 1–2)	(Italy) A|X Armani Exchange Milan	Munich
20:45 (CET)	Scoring by quarter: 23–9, 16–26, 25–16, 21–28
	Pts: Lučić 27; Rebs: Johnson 9 Asts: Šiško 8 PIR: Lučić 35	Boxscore	Pts: Delaney 18; Rebs: LeDay 4 Asts: Hines, Roll 3 PIR: Delaney 21	Arena: Audi Dome; Attendance: 0 Referees: Damir Javor, Mehdi Difallah, Gytis Vilius

30 April 2021 Game 4	Bayern Munich (Germany)	85–82 (Series: 2–2)	(Italy) A|X Armani Exchange Milan	Munich
20:45 (CET)	Scoring by quarter: 23–19, 17–31, 23–21, 22–11
	Pts: Baldwin 18; Rebs: Johnson 7 Asts: Baldwin 4 PIR: Lučić, Zipser 18	Boxscore	Pts: Delaney 28; Rebs: Evans, Shields 7 Asts: Shields 5 PIR: Delaney 30	Arena: Audi Dome; Attendance: 0 Referees: Matej Boltauzer, Juan Carlos García, Tomislav Hordov

4 May 2021 Game 5	A|X Armani Exchange Milan (Italy)	92–89 (Series: 3–2)	(Germany) Bayern Munich	Milan
20:45 (CET)	Scoring by quarter: 24–22, 26–18, 22–18, 20–31
	Pts: Shields 34; Rebs: Hines 7 Asts: Rodríguez 7 PIR: Shields 41	Boxscore	Pts: Reynolds 19; Rebs: Reynolds 10; Asts: Baldwin 5 PIR: Reynolds 24	Arena: Mediolanum Forum; Attendance: 0 Referees: Sreten Radović, Miguel Ángel Pérez, Gytis Vilius
