= EuroLeague TV =

European basketball web channel

Logo

EuroLeague TV is an internet specialty channel that covers the primary level European-wide men's professional club basketball league, the EuroLeague, as well as the secondary level European-wide basketball league, the EuroCup. EuroLeague TV is the official broadcaster for both leagues. The channel's commentary is in English, and the network is financially dependent on the EuroLeague, and its parent company, Euroleague Basketball.

The games are broadcast live through the internet, and can also be purchased through a yearly subscription, or one by one.

== Personalities ==
- Frank Lawlor
- Andy West
- Liam Canny
- Johnny Rogers
- George Zidek
- Joe Arlauckas
- Theodoros Papaloukas
- Aleksandar Đorđević
