= Vyacheslav Zaytsev (basketball) =

Russian basketball player

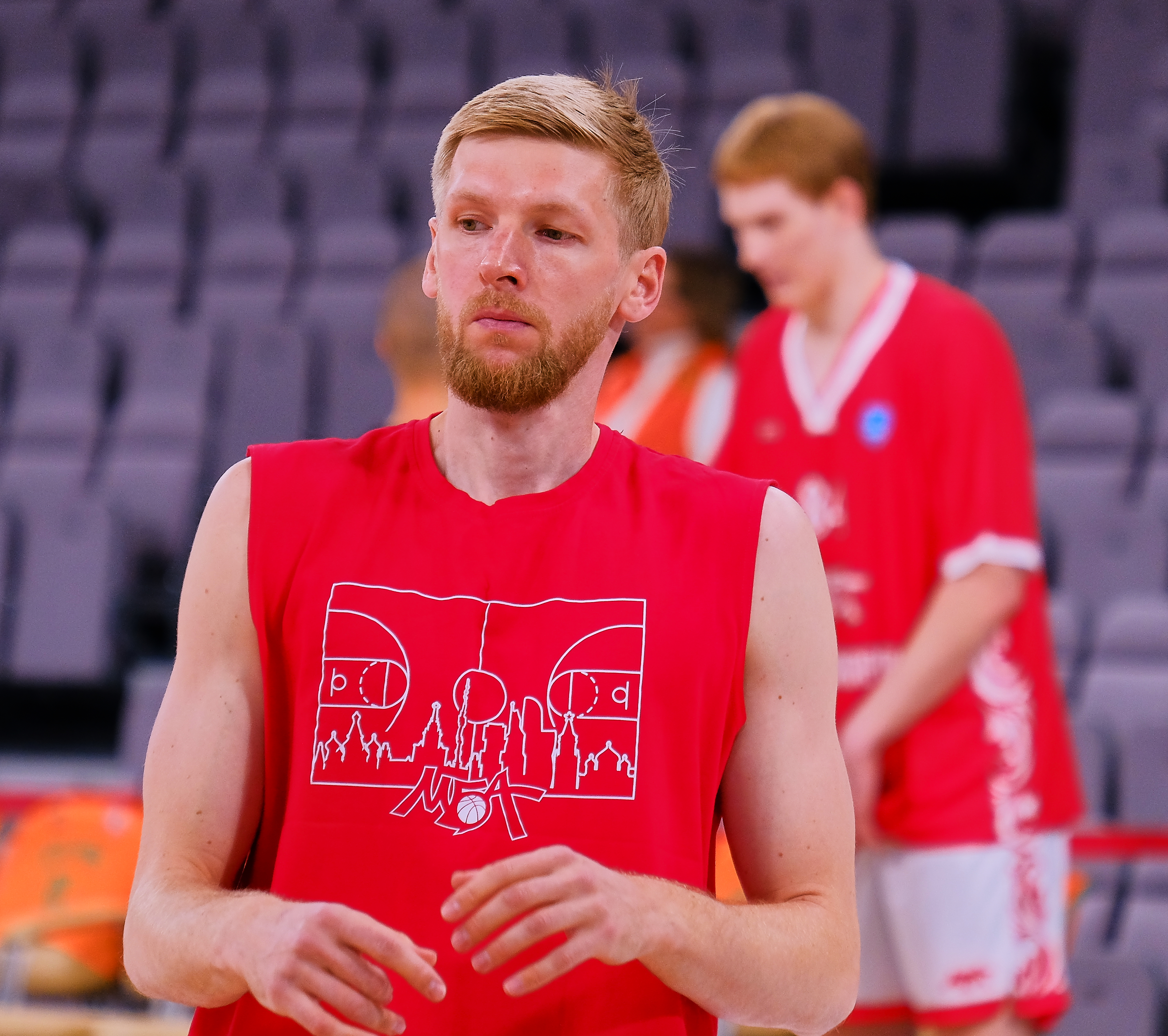
- Zaytsev with BC MBA Moscow in 2025

No. 8 – MBA Moscow
- Position: Point guard
- League: VTB United League

Personal information
- Born: August 28, 1989 (age 37) Saint Petersburg, Russia
- Listed height: 190 cm (6 ft 3 in)
- Listed weight: 88 kg (194 lb)

Career information
- Playing career: 2008–present

Career history
- 2008–2011: Khimki
- 2011–2015: Enisey
- 2015–2016: Krasny Oktyabr
- 2016–2021: Khimki
- 2021–2024: BC UNICS
- 2024–2025: BC Uralmash Yekaterinburg
- 2025–present: MBA Moscow

Career highlights
- VTB United League champion (2011)

Vyacheslav Andreyevich Zaytsev (Russian: Вячеслав Андреевич Зайцев; born August 28, 1989) is a Russian professional basketball player for MBA Moscow of the VTB United League.

== Professional career ==
In July 2016, Zaytsev signed a one-year contract with an option for a second year, with Khimki Moscow Region, returning to his former club after five years. On June 30, 2017, Zaytsev re-signed with Khimki, for another two years.

== International career ==
Zaytsev played for the Russian junior national Under-18 and Under-20 teams.
