= D. J. Seeley =

American basketball player (born 1989)

Personal information
- Born: November 28, 1989 (age 36) Redding, California, U.S.
- Listed height: 6 ft 4 in (1.93 m)
- Listed weight: 195 lb (88 kg)

Career information
- High school: Modesto Christian (Modesto, California)
- College: California (2008–2010); Cal State Fullerton (2011–2013)
- NBA draft: 2013: undrafted
- Playing career: 2013–present
- Position: Shooting guard

Career history
- 2013–2014: Radnički Kragujevac
- 2014: Medi Bayreuth
- 2014–2015: Delaware 87ers
- 2015: Manresa
- 2015: Beşiktaş
- 2015–2016: Gran Canaria
- 2016–2017: Maccabi Tel Aviv
- 2017–2018: Gran Canaria
- 2018–2019: Rytas Vilnius
- 2019–2020: Zaragoza
- 2020–2021: Bayern Munich
- 2021–2022: Buducnost VOLI
- 2022: BCM Gravelines-Dunkerque
- 2023: Bayern Munich
- 2023-2025: U-BT Cluj-Napoca

Career highlights
- Romanian Liga Națională winner (2024, 2025); Romanian Cup winner (2024); Montenegrin League champion (2022); King Mindaugas Cup winner (2019); Israeli Cup winner (2017); Montenegrin Cup winner (2022); First-team All-Big West (2012); Second-team All-Big West (2013); Big West Newcomer of the Year (2012)
- Stats at Basketball Reference

Dennis Jerome Seeley (born November 28, 1989) is an American professional basketball player who most recently played for U-BT Cluj-Napoca of the Romanian Liga Națională. He played college basketball for California and Cal State Fullerton. He has won National Cup competitions in five countries as a professional, and national titles in two countries.

== Prep career ==
Seeley played prep basketball in the San Joaquin Valley of California, starting his career at Tokay High School in Lodi, California. He helped the team to the CIF NorCal State final in the 2005-2006 season. He moved on to Modesto Christian High School, where he was named to the Best in the West team by the Long Beach Press-Telegram as a senior, again taking part in the CIF NorCal championship game. Seeley signed a letter of intent to play basketball for the Golden Bears of the University of California for the Signing Class of 2008. He was ranked as the 60th best prospect in his class by RSCIHoops.

== College career ==
During his freshman campaign, Seeley saw action in 26 games for the Golden Bears. The most memorable moment came versus Washington when Seeley tied the game in double overtime after being fouled on a made field goal and converting the free throw, a game the Golden Bears would go on to win. The following season, Seeley held a similar role off the bench for the Bears. At the end of season, transferred to Cal State Fullerton.

After sitting out the 2010-2011 season, Seeley saw a much larger role in his first season with the Titans than he experienced at Cal. He averaged over 17 points a game, with a game high of 32 in the final game of the year versus Loyola Marymount University in the College Insider Postseason Tournament (CIT). Seeley also tied for the conference lead in free throws attempted, and was named to the All-Big West 1st team. For his senior season, he again averaged over 17 points per game, scoring over 30 points on three separate occasions. He also lead the conference in steals per game. He was named to the All-Big West 2nd team with his teammate, Kwame Vaughn.

== Professional career ==
After going undrafted in the 2013 NBA draft, Seeley joined the Los Angeles Lakers for the 2013 NBA Summer League. Seeley saw action in 4 games, averaging 11 minutes per game. On July 27, 2013, he signed with Radnički Kragujevac of Serbia for the 2013–14 season. In February 2014, he left Radnički and signed with Medi Bayreuth of Germany for the rest of the season.

On November 1, 2014, Seeley was selected by the Delaware 87ers with the 19th overall pick in the 2014 NBA Development League Draft. On April 9, 2015, after the end of the 2014–15 D-League season, he signed a one-month contract with La Bruixa d'Or Manresa of the Spanish Liga ACB.

On July 26, 2015, Seeley signed with Beşiktaş of Turkey. On December 2, 2015, he left Beşiktaş and signed with Herbalife Gran Canaria for the rest of the season.

On June 28, 2016, Seeley signed a one-year deal, with an option for another one, with Israeli club Maccabi Tel Aviv.

On June 27, 2017, Seeley returned to Gran Canaria for a second stint, signing a one-year deal.

On August 13, 2018, Seeley signed with the Lithuanian team Rytas Vilnius for the 2018–19 season.

On July 29, 2019, Seeley signed with a one-year deal, with an option for another one, Spanish club Casademont Zaragoza. After averaging 11 points, three rebounds and 2.5 assists per game, Seeley re-signed with the team on July 2, 2020. He averaged 13.1 points, 2.3 rebounds and 1.7 assists per game. On December 3, Seeley signed with Bayern Munich of the Basketball Bundesliga.

On August 1, 2021, he has signed with Buducnost VOLI of the Adriatic League and the Prva A Liga.

On July 30, 2022, he has signed with BCM Gravelines-Dunkerque of the LNB Pro A.

On January 18, 2023, Seeley signed back with Bayern Munich of the Basketball Bundesliga.

On July 28, 2023, Seeley signed with the Romanian team U-BT Cluj-Napoca. On September 19, 2024, he signed another one year contract with Cluj.

== Career statistics ==
Legend
GP	Games played	GS	Games started	MPG	Minutes per game
FG%	Field-goal percentage	3P%	3-point field-goal percentage	FT%	Free-throw percentage
RPG	Rebounds per game	APG	Assists per game	SPG	Steals per game
BPG	Blocks per game	PPG	Points per game	PIR	Performance index rating
**Bold**	Career high

=== EuroLeague ===
Year	Team	GP	GS	MPG	FG%	3P%	FT%	RPG	APG	SPG	BPG	PPG	PIR
2016–17	Maccabi	26	14	20.2	.430	.378	.887	2	2.6	0.5	0.2	7.3	7.0
Career		26	14	20.2	.430	.378	.887	2	2.6	0.5	0.2	7.3	7.0
