= Zach LeDay =

American basketball player (born 1994)

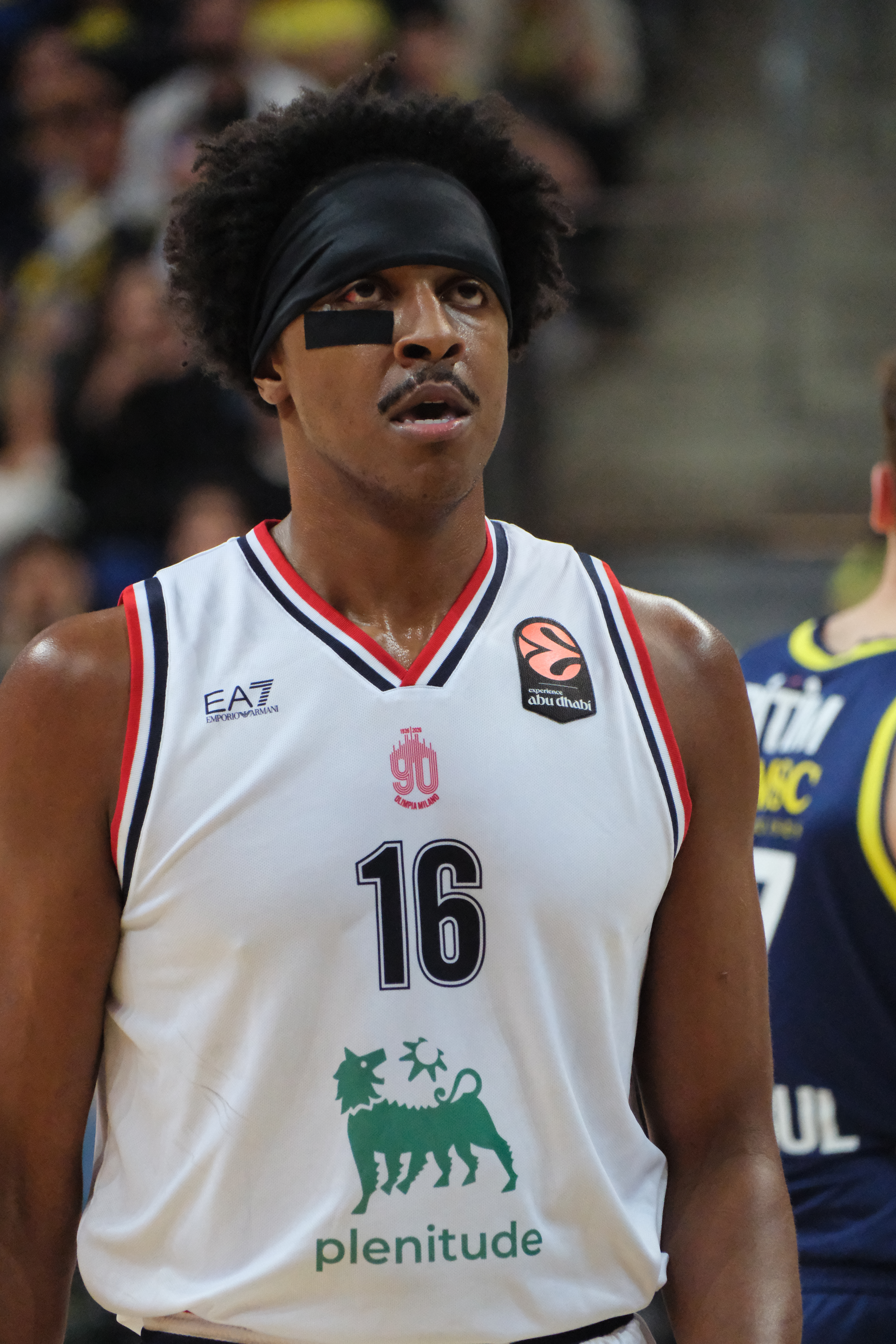
- LeDay with Olimpia Milano in 2026

No. 16 – Hapoel Tel Aviv
- Position: Power forward
- League: Israeli Basketball Premier League; EuroLeague

Personal information
- Born: May 30, 1994 (age 32) Dallas, Texas, U.S.
- Listed height: 2.02 m (6 ft 8 in)
- Listed weight: 107 kg (236 lb)

Career information
- High school: Skyline (Dallas, Texas); The Colony (The Colony, Texas)
- College: South Florida (2012–2014); Virginia Tech (2015–2017)
- NBA draft: 2017: undrafted
- Playing career: 2016–present

Career history
- 2017–2018: Hapoel Gilboa Galil
- 2018–2019: Olympiacos
- 2019–2020: Žalgiris
- 2020–2021: Olimpia Milano
- 2021–2024: Partizan
- 2024–2026: Olimpia Milano
- 2026–present: Hapoel Tel Aviv

Career highlights
- EuroLeague 50–40–90 club (2025); Lega Serie A champion (2026); 2× Italian Cup winner (2021, 2026); 3× Italian Supercup winner (2020, 2024, 2025); ABA League champion (2023); 2× All-ABA League Team (2022, 2024); All-Lega Serie A Team (2021); LKL champion (2020); King Mindaugas Cup winner (2020); All-LKL Team (2020); Greek All Star (2019); All-Israeli Basketball Premier League First Team (2018); Israeli Basketball Premier League All-Star (2018)

Zachary Vincent LeDay (born May 30, 1994) is an American-born naturalized Azerbaijani professional basketball player for Hapoel Tel Aviv of the Israeli Basketball Premier League and the EuroLeague. He played college basketball for the University of South Florida and Virginia Tech. At a height of 2.02 m (6' 7 1/2") tall, and a weight of 107 kg (235 lbs.), LeDay primarily plays at the power forward position.

== Early life ==
LeDay attended Skyline High School in Dallas, Texas, where he had grown up. He then transferred for his senior year to The Colony High School in The Colony, Texas.

== College career ==
=== South Florida ===
LeDay played two years at South Florida. In 32 games he averaged 15.1 minutes, 3.4 points, and 2.6 rebounds in his sophomore year.

=== Virginia Tech ===
On June 4, 2014, LeDay transferred from South Florida to Virginia Tech. He sat out his first season at Virginia Tech per NCAA transfer rules In his junior year, in 2015-16, in 35 games he averaged 30.8 minutes, 15.5 points, 7.9 rebounds (10th in the conference), 1.4 assists, and 1.7 blocks (6th) per game, while shooting 47.8% from the field (9th). He was named All-ACC Honorable Mention, and to the Emerald Coast Classic All-Tournament Team.

In his senior year at Virginia Tech, in 2016-17, in 35 games LeDay averaged 29.4 minutes, 16.4 points, 7.3 rebounds (10th in the conference), 1.2 assists, and 1.0 blocks per game, while shooting 53.8% from the field (3rd). Playing under new coach Buzz Williams, he led Virginia Tech to its first NCAA tournament in 10 years.

LeDay was named to the 2017 Wooden Legacy All-Tournament Team, 2017 Atlantic Coast Conference (ACC) All-Honorable Mention Team, and the 2017 ACC All-Tournament Second Team. He participated in the Portsmouth Invitational Tournament following his senior season, averaging 18.7 points and 9.6 rebounds in three games. LeDay was named to the Portsmouth Invitational Tournament All-Tournament First Team.

== Professional career ==
=== Hapoel Gilboa Galil (2017–2018) ===
On July 27, 2017, LeDay signed with the Israeli team Hapoel Gilboa Galil for the 2017–18 season. On December 9, 2017, LeDay recorded a double-double of 22 points and 20 rebounds in a 72–71 win over Hapoel Jerusalem, becoming the first player to record a 20-point, 20-rebounds game in the Israeli Basketball Premier League since Diamon Simpson in 2014. He was subsequently named Israeli League Round 9 MVP. On March 2, 2018, LeDay participated in the Israeli Basketball Premier League All-Star Game and the Slam Dunk Contest during the same event.

During his season with Gilboa Galil, LeDay was named two-time Israeli Basketball Premier League Player of the Month (for games played in December and April). LeDay helped Gilboa Galil reach the 2018 Israeli Basketball Premier League Playoffs, where they eventually lost to Hapoel Jerusalem. LeDay finished the season as the league's second-leading scorer with 19.5 points per game, second in efficiency rating with 23.0 per game, fourth in blocks per game (1.3), and fifth in rebounds with 8.0 per game, as he also averaged 32.3 minutes, 1.7 assists, and 1.0 steals over 37 games, while shooting 50.7% from the field and 80.2% from the free throw line.

On June 8, 2018, LeDay earned a spot in the All-Israeli Basketball Premier League First Team.

=== Olympiacos (2018–2019) ===
On June 29, 2018, LeDay joined the Atlanta Hawks for the 2018 NBA Summer League. He played in one game, in which he grabbed four rebounds in five minutes.

On July 7, 2018, LeDay signed a three-year deal with the Greek team Olympiacos of the EuroLeague. On November 30, 2018, LeDay recorded a season-high 28 points, shooting 9-of-11 from the field, along with eight rebounds and two steals in a 90–72 win over Budućnost, becoming the first player in the EuroLeague who recorded 42 PIR in 21 minutes. He was subsequently named EuroLeague Round 10 MVP. LeDay took part in 25 Greek League games, averaging 11.2 points and 4.8 rebounds per game; in the Greek League and Euroleague combined in 55 games he averaged 17.6 minutes, 10.4 points, and 4.4 rebounds per game, while shooting 53.6% from the floor and 81.8% from the free throw line.

On July 5, 2019, LeDay parted ways with Olympiacos.

=== Žalgiris (2019–2020) ===
On July 27, 2019, LeDay signed a 1+1-year deal with Žalgiris Kaunas of the Lithuanian Basketball League. On October 17, 2019, LeDay recorded 26 points, shooting 10-of-14 from the field, along with nine rebounds, two assists, and one steal, leading Žalgiris to an 86–73 win over Real Madrid. LeDay in 52 games averaged 19.7 minutes, 11.4 points, 4.5 rebounds, and 0.9 assists per game, while shooting 54.2% from the field, 47.9% from three-point range, and 84.2% from the free throw line.

On July 13, 2020, LeDay parted ways with the Lithuanian club.

=== Olimpia Milano (2020–2021) ===
On July 13, 2020, he signed with Olimpia Milano of the Lega Basket Serie A (LBA) and the EuroLeague. In 73 games in which he averaged 24.3 minutes, 12.3 points, and 5.2 rebounds per game, while shooting 50.5% from the field, 45.7% from three point range, and 90.2% from the free throw line.

At the end of the season, despite helping his team to the 2021 EuroLeague Final Four where Milano finished in third place, LeDay and Milano mutually agreed to part ways on July 6, 2021.

=== Partizan (2021–2024) ===
On July 6, 2021, he signed a two-year deal with Partizan of the ABA League and the EuroCup. During the 2021–22 season, in 55 games, LeDay averaged 27.2 minutes, 12.4 points, 5.2 rebounds, and 1.7 assists per game, while shooting 50.9% from the floor, 44.6% from three point range, and 80.4% from the free throw line.

During the 2022–23 season, in 79 games, LeDay averaged 27.3 minutes, 10.8 points, 4.6 rebounds, and 1.2 assists per game, while shooting 50.3% from the floor, 42.4% from three point range, and 83.1% from the free throw line.

Partizan ended the 2022–23 season by lifting the ABA League championship trophy, after 3–2 score against Crvena zvezda in the Finals series. On July 2, 2023, LeDay renewed his contract with Partizan for another two years.

During the 2023–24 season, in 68 games, LeDay averaged 26.3 minutes, 10.5 points, 4.1 rebounds, and 1.2 assists per game, while shooting 45.3% from the floor,, and 88.4% from the free throw line.

On June 21, 2024, LeDay parted ways with Partizan after three seasons.

=== Return to Olimpia Milano (2024–2026) ===
On June 25, 2024, LeDay signed a two-year contract with Olimpia Milano.

In November 2024, he was awarded the Euroleague Regular Season MVP for Round 7. He had 19 points, 4 rebounds, 2 steals and 2 assists to lead his team. In December 2024, he was awarded the Euroleague Regular Season MVP for Round 15. He had 33 points, 4 rebounds and 1 steal to lead his team to a win. In February 2025, LeDay won MVP of Round 24 of the Euroleague regular season. He scored a career-high-tying 33 points and had 8 rebounds leading his team to a win. During the 2024–25 season, in 73 games, LeDay averaged 26.4 minutes, 14.1 points, 4.5 rebounds, and 1.4assists per game, while shooting 47.7% from the floor, 43.4% from three-point range, and 89.5% from the free throw line.

During the 2024–25 season, in 67 games, LeDay averaged 24.2 minutes, 11.8 points, and 4.1 rebound per game, while shooting 47.5% from the floor, 42.6% from three-point range, and 87.8% from the free throw line.

Concluding his second stint, LeDay helped lead Olimpia Milano to the first Italian Treble in history.

=== Hapoel Tel Aviv (2026–present) ===
On July 14, 2026, LeDay signed with Hapoel Tel Aviv of the Israeli Basketball Premier League.

== National team career ==
In February 2024, LeDay debuted for Azerbaijan in match against Switzerland. In 40 minutes, he scored 22 points and grabbed six rebounds, as the team lost to Switzerland, which beat them 72-53.

== Career statistics ==
Legend
GP	Games played	GS	Games started	MPG	Minutes per game
FG%	Field-goal percentage	3P%	3-point field-goal percentage	FT%	Free-throw percentage
RPG	Rebounds per game	APG	Assists per game	SPG	Steals per game
BPG	Blocks per game	PPG	Points per game	PIR	Performance index rating
**Bold**	Career high

=== EuroLeague ===
*	Led the league

Year	Team	GP	GS	MPG	FG%	3P%	FT%	RPG	APG	SPG	BPG	PPG	PIR
2018–19	Olympiacos	30	2	17.0	**.538**	.357	.781	4.0	.3	.3	.4	9.7	10.8
2019–20	Žalgiris	28*	6	22.4	.505	.434	.844	4.7	1.0	.5	**.7**	11.8	13.2
2020–21	Olimpia Milano	36	**34**	24.7	.481	**.466**	**.918**	4.6	.6	.6	.3	10.0	12.2
2022–23	Partizan	**39**	**34**	**30.9**	.500	.384	.853	**5.1**	1.2	.7	.3	11.4	14.0
2023–24	Partizan	29	22	30.1	.466	.362	.880	4.6	**1.5**	**.8**	.1	10.2	13.1
2024–25	Olimpia Milano	34	23	27.7	.506	.462	.915	4.5	1.2	.7	.1	**16.0**	**16.1**
2025–26	Olimpia Milano	30	30	24.3	.506	.495	.824	4.2	.9	.5	.2	13.1	15.1
Career		226	151	25.3	.500	.437	.862	4.5	1.0	.6	.4	11.8	14.0

=== EuroCup ===
Year	Team	GP	GS	MPG	FG%	3P%	FT%	RPG	APG	SPG	BPG	PPG	PIR
2021–22	Partizan	18	13	27.1	.500	.458	.839	5.5	1.2	.7	.3	12.9	16.1
Career		18	13	27.1	.500	.458	.839	5.5	1.2	.7	.3	12.9	16.1

=== Domestic leagues ===
Year	Team	League	GP	MPG	FG%	3P%	FT%	RPG	APG	SPG	BPG	PPG
2017–18	(Israel) Hapoel Gilboa Galil	Ligat HaAl	37	32.3	.507	.373	.802	8.0	1.7	1.0	1.3	19.5
2018–19	(Greece) Olympiacos	HEBA A1	25	18.2	.535	.333	.866	4.8	.7	.6	.5	11.2
2019–20	(Lithuania) Žalgiris	LKL	24	16.6	.593	.556	.838	4.2	.9	.7	.6	11.0
2020–21	(Italy) Olimpia Milano	LBA	34	23.8	.516	.446	.895	5.8	1.1	.5	.4	14.6
2021–22	(Serbia) Partizan	ABA	34	27.4	.511	.445	.773	5.2	2.1	.7	.4	12.3
2022–23	(Serbia) Partizan	ABA	35	23.6	.500	.453	.833	4.0	1.2	.5	.5	10.0
2023–24	(Serbia) Partizan	KLS	4	26.9	.346	.333	.895	5.2	1.2	1.2	.7	9.5
2023–24	(Serbia) Partizan	ABA	29	22.7	.449	.416	.860	3.7	.9	.6	.4	10.5
2024–25	(Italy) Olimpia Milano	LBA	36	25.0	.454	.409	.882	4.4	1.6	.7	.4	12.5
2025–26	(Italy) Olimpia Milano	LBA	34	23.2	.443	.340	.936	3.9	.8	.4	.6	10.4

=== College ===
Year	Team	GP	GS	MPG	FG%	3P%	FT%	RPG	APG	SPG	BPG	PPG
2012–13	South Florida	31	7	16.9	.384	.292	.727	2.5	.3	.4	.5	4.8
2013–14	South Florida	32	16	15.0	.412	.273	.760	2.6	.4	.3	.2	3.5
2014–15	Virginia Tech	Redshirt										
2015–16	Virginia Tech	35	32	30.8	.478	.356	.762	7.9	1.4	.8	1.7	15.5
2016–17	Virginia Tech	33	5	29.4	.536	.275	.776	7.5	1.3	.6	1.0	16.9
Career		131	60	23.3	.482	.313	.763	5.2	.8	.5	.9	10.4

== Personal life ==
LeDay is the son of Ricki LeDay, a former football player and Gulf War veteran. His father passed away in March 2024 while LeDay was overseas playing basketball.
