= 2020–21 New Basket Brindisi season =

Italian basketball season

New Basket Brindisi
2020-21 season
- Owner: New Basket Brindisi S.p.A.
- President: Fernando Marino
- Head coach: Francesco Vitucci
- Arena: PalaPentassuglia
- LBA: 2nd of 15
- Playoffs: Semifinals
- BCL: Play-offs (3rd of 4)
- Italian Cup: Semifinals
- Supercup: Group stage (2nd of 4)

The 2020–21 season is New Basket Brindisi's 29th in existence and the club's 3rd consecutive season in the top tier Italian basketball.

== Kit ==
Supplier: Adidas / Sponsor: Happy Casa

=== Basketball Champions League ===
Home	Away

=== Serie A ===
Home	Away	Italian Cup

== Players ==
=== Current roster ===
Happy Casa Brindisi roster
Players
Coaches

Pos.	No.	Nat.	Name	Ht.	Wt.	Age
SF	00	(United States)	Bostic, Josh	1.96 m (6 ft 5 in)	102 kg (225 lb)	39 – 12 May 1987
SF	3	(Italy)	Motta, Felipe	1.99 m (6 ft 6 in)		23 – 2 April 2003
F/C	5	(The Gambia)	Krubally, Ousman	2.01 m (6 ft 7 in)	102 kg (225 lb)	38 – 13 March 1988
PG	6	(Italy)	Zanelli, Alessandro (C)	1.88 m (6 ft 2 in)	82 kg (181 lb)	34 – 7 June 1992
SG	7	(United States)	Harrison, D'Angelo	1.93 m (6 ft 4 in)	92 kg (203 lb)	33 – 14 August 1993
SG	9	(Italy)	Visconti, Riccardo	1.97 m (6 ft 6 in)	84 kg (185 lb)	27 – 8 October 1998
PF	10	(Italy)	Gaspardo, Raphael	2.07 m (6 ft 9 in)	100 kg (220 lb)	33 – 3 August 1993
PG	15	(United States)	Thompson, Darius	1.93 m (6 ft 4 in)	89 kg (196 lb)	31 – 4 May 1995
C	18	(Italy)	Cattapan, Riccardo	2.13 m (7 ft 0 in)	103 kg (227 lb)	29 – 5 July 1997
G	21	(Italy)	Guido, Alessandro	1.88 m (6 ft 2 in)	80 kg (176 lb)	23 – 3 October 2002
F	22	(Italy)	Udom, Mattia	2.00 m (6 ft 7 in)	104 kg (229 lb)	32 – 17 November 1993
SF	31	(United States)	Bell, James	1.98 m (6 ft 6 in)	100 kg (220 lb)	34 – 7 January 1992
F/C	33	(United States)	Perkins, Nick	2.03 m (6 ft 8 in)	113 kg (249 lb)	29 – 15 October 1996
PF	35	(United States)	Willis, Derek	2.06 m (6 ft 9 in)	104 kg (229 lb)	31 – 21 June 1995

Head coach

- (Italy) Francesco Vitucci

Assistant coach(es)

- (Italy) Alberto Morea
- (Italy) Mattia Consoli

Legend

- (C) Team captain
- Injured

- Roster
Updated: 2 June 2021

Note: Flags indicate national team eligibility at FIBA-sanctioned events. Players may hold other non-FIBA nationalities not displayed.

=== Depth chart ===
Pos.	Starting 5	Bench 1	Bench 2
C	Nick Perkins	Ousman Krubally	Riccardo Cattapan
PF	Derek Willis	Raphael Gaspardo	Mattia Udom
SF	Josh Bostic	James Bell	Felipe Motta
SG	D'Angelo Harrison	Riccardo Visconti
PG	Darius Thompson	Alessandro Zanelli	Alessandro Guido

6+6 format (colours: Italian or homegrown players; foreign players; young players)

=== Squad changes ===
==== In ====
No.	Pos.	Nat.	Name	Age	Moving from		Type	Ends	Transfer fee	Date	Source
31	SF	(United States)	James Bell	28	Promitheas Patras	(Greece)	2 years	June 2022	Free	11 July 2020	
35	F	(United States)	Derek Willis	25	ratiopharm Ulm	(Germany)	1 year	June 2021	Free	17 July 2020	
22	F	(Italy)	Mattia Udom	26	Scaligera Verona	(Italy)	2 years	June 2022	Free	20 July 2020	
9	SG	(Italy)	Riccardo Visconti	21	Pallacanestro Mantovana	(Italy)	2 years	June 2022	Free	21 July 2020	
5	F/C	(The Gambia) (United States)	Ousman Krubally	32	ESSM Le Portel	(France)	1 year	June 2021	Free	22 July 2020	
7	SG	(United States)	D'Angelo Harrison	26	Maccabi Rishon LeZion	(Israel)	1 year	June 2021	Free	3 August 2020	
33	F/C	(United States)	Nick Perkins	23	Niigata Albirex	(Japan)	1 year	June 2021	Free	9 August 2020	
3	SF	(Italy) (Brazil)	Felipe Motta	17	Basket Ceglie Messapica	(Italy)			Youth system	18 December 2020	
00	SF	(United States)	Josh Bostic	33	UNAHOTELS Reggio Emilia	(Italy)	End of the season	June 2021	Undisclosed	22 February 2021	

1. In players: Players who signed after the beginning of the season

==== Out ====
No.	Pos.	Nat.	Name	Age	Moving to		Type	Transfer fee	Date	Source
0	SG	(United States) (Israel)	Adrian Banks	34	Fortitudo Bologna	(Italy)	End of contract	Free	6 June 2020	
35	F	(Italy)	Iris Ikangi	26	Cestistica San Severo	(Italy)	Exit option	Free	26 June 2020	
00	F/C	(United States)	John Brown	28	UNICS Kazan	(Russia)	End of contract	Free	1 July 2020	
1	SF	(United States)	Kelvin Martin	30	Aquila Basket Trento	(Italy)	End of contract	Free	1 July 2020	
2	F	(United States)	Dominique Sutton	33	Al-Ahli	(Bahrain)	End of contract	Free	1 July 2020	
12	G	(Italy)	Luca Campogrande	24	Virtus Roma	(Italy)	End of contract	Free	1 July 2020	
33	PF	(United States)	Tyler Stone	28	Nanterre 92	(France)	End of contract	Free	1 July 2020	

==== Confirmed ====
No.	Pos.	Nat.	Name	Age	Moving from		Type	Ends	Transfer fee	Date	Source
6	PG	(Italy)	Alessandro Zanelli	28	Legnano Basket Knights	(Italy)	2 + 2 year	June 2022	Free	5 June 2018	
10	PF	(Italy)	Raphael Gaspardo	26	Reggio Emilia	(Italy)	1 + 2 year	June 2022	Free	29 June 2019	
18	C	(Italy)	Riccardo Cattapan	22	Junior Casale	(Italy)	1 + 1 year	June 2021	Free	18 July 2019	
15	PG	(United States)	Darius Thompson	25	ZZ Leiden	(Netherlands)	1 + 1 year	June 2021	Free	23 July 2019	

==== Froum youth team ====
No.	Pos.	Nat.	Name	Age	Transfer fee	Date	Source
21	G	(Italy)	Alessandro Guido	17	Youth system	25 July 2020	

==== Coach ====
Nat.	Name	Age.	Previous team		Type	Ends	Date	Source
(Italy)	Francesco Vitucci	57	Auxilium Torino	(Italy)	1 + 3	June 2022	14 December 2017	

== Competitions ==
=== Supercup ===
Pos	Team	Pld	W	L	PF	PA	PD	Qualification
1	Banco di Sardegna Sassari	6	4	2	563	484	+79	Advance to Final Four
2	Happy Casa Brindisi	6	4	2	528	470	+58	
3	Carpegna Prosciutto Pesaro	6	4	2	498	435	+63	
4	Virtus Roma	6	0	6	394	594	−200	

Source: LegaBasket Serie A
Rules for classification: All points scored in extra period(s) were not counted in the standings, nor for any tie-break situation.

=== Italian Cup ===
Brindisi qualified to the 2021 Italian Basketball Cup by ending the first half of the LBA season in the 2nd position. They played the quarterfinal against the 7th ranking Allianz Pallacanestro Trieste.

12 February 2021 Quarterfinals	Happy Casa Brindisi	93–81	Allianz Pallacanestro Trieste	Assago (Milan)
18:00	Scoring by quarter: 25-18, 18-20, 23-23, 27-20
Rai Sport, Eurosport	Pts: Gaspardo 17; Rebs: Udom 9 Asts: Thompson 9 PIR: Udom 23	Boxscore	Pts: Doyle 16; Rebs: Delía 8 Asts: Doyle 10; PIR: Henry	Arena: Mediolanum Forum; Referees: Carmelo Paternicò, Beniamino Manuel Attard, Denny Borgioni

14 February 2021 Semifinal	Happy Casa Brindisi	69–74	Carpegna Prosciutto Pesaro	Assago (Milan)
20:45	Scoring by quarter: 12-15, 16-26, 17-11, 24-22
Rai Sport, Eurosport	Pts: Thompson 19; Rebs: Udom, Willis 7 Asts: Thompson 7 PIR: Thompson 24	Boxscore	Pts: J. Robinson 23; Rebs: Cain 14; Asts: J. Robinson 4 PIR: J. Robinson 23	Arena: Mediolanum Forum; Referees: Carmelo Paternicò, Alessandro Martolini, Andrea Bongiorni

=== Serie A ===
==== Regular season ====
Pos	Team	Pld	W	L	PF	PA	PD	Qualification
1	AX Armani Exchange Milano	28	22	6	2385	2099	+286	Qualification to Playoffs
2	Happy Casa Brindisi	28	20	8	2395	2212	+183	Qualification to Playoffs
3	Virtus Segafredo Bologna	28	19	9	2397	2168	+229	Qualification to Playoffs
4	Umana Reyer Venezia	28	19	9	2257	2142	+115	Qualification to Playoffs
5	Banco di Sardegna Sassari	28	18	10	2527	2437	+90	Qualification to Playoffs

Updated to match(es) played on 10 May 2021. Source: LBA

==== Playoffs ====
===== Quarterfinals =====
13 May 2021 Game 1	Happy Casa Brindisi	85–64 (Series: 1-0)	Allianz Pallacanestro Trieste	Brindisi
20:45 (CET)	Scoring by quarter: 21-18, 22-10, 14-17, 28-19
Rai Sport, Eurosport Player	Pts: Harrison 16; Rebs: Perkins 10; Asts: Thompson 6 PIR: Willis 21	Boxscore	Pts: Doyle 12; Rebs: Alviti 6 Asts: Da Ros, Doyle 2 PIR: Upson 19	Arena: PalaPentassuglia; Referees: Carmelo Lo Guzzo, Denis Quarta, Christian Borgo

14 May 2021 Game 2	Happy Casa Brindisi	86–54 (Series: 2-0)	Allianz Pallacanestro Trieste	Brindisi
20:45 (CET)	Scoring by quarter: 25-11, 15-14, 28-16, 18-13
Eurosport Player	Pts: Perkins 17; Rebs: Krubally 10; Asts: Harrison 7 PIR: Perkins 20	Boxscore	Pts: Alviti 14; Rebs: Upson, Delía, Henry 4 Asts: Fernández, Cavaliero 3 PIR: Alviti 14	Arena: PalaPentassuglia; Referees: Michele Rossi, Alessandro Martolini, Giacomo Dori

17 May 2021 Game 3	Allianz Pallacanestro Trieste	77–79 (Series: 0-3)	Happy Casa Brindisi	Trieste
19:00 (CET)	Scoring by quarter: 20-25, 21-22, 18-16, 18-16
Eurosport 2, Eurosport Player	Pts: Henry 22; Rebs: Upson, Delía, Henry 7 Asts: Delía 3 PIR: Henry 24	Boxscore	Pts: Perkins 19; Rebs: Willis 8 Asts: Thompson 5 PIR: Willis 30	Arena: Allianz Dome; Referees: Carmelo Paternicò, Alessandro Vicino, Alessandro Nicolini

===== Semifinals =====
23 May 2021 Game 1	Happy Casa Brindisi	66–73 (Series: 0-1)	Segafredo Virtus Bologna	Brindisi
20:45 (CET)	Scoring by quarter: 16-17, 13-15, 21-21, 16-20
Rai Sport, Eurosport 2	Pts: Willis 15; Rebs: Willis 13; Asts: Thompson 4 PIR: Willis 30	Boxscore	Pts: Teodosić 24; Rebs: Gamble 7 Asts: Teodosić 4 PIR: Teodosić 20	Arena: PalaPentassuglia; Referees: Carmelo Paternicò, Beniamino Manuel Attard, Fabrizio Paglialunga

25 May 2021 Game 2	Happy Casa Brindisi	74–83 (Series: 0-2)	Segafredo Virtus Bologna	Brindisi
20:45 (CET)	Scoring by quarter: 18-19, 20-20, 18-21, 18-23
Rai Sport, Eurosport 2	Pts: Harrison 16; Rebs: Willis 8 Asts: Thompson 5 PIR: Willis 16	Boxscore	Pts: Belinelli, Teodosić 16; Rebs: Ricci 11; Asts: Marković 5 PIR: Ricci 20	Arena: PalaPentassuglia; Referees: Tolga Sahin, Carmelo Lo Guzzo, Lorenzo Baldini

2 June 2021 Game 3	Segafredo Virtus Bologna	78–75 (Series: 3-0)	Happy Casa Brindisi	Bologna
19:00 (CET)	Scoring by quarter: 13-17, 24-23, 18-13, 23-22
Rai Sport, Eurosport 2	Pts: Teodosić 29; Rebs: Weems 7 Asts: Teodosić, Marković 5 PIR: Teodosić 29	Boxscore	Pts: Harrison 15; Rebs: Harrison, Willis 9 Asts: Thompson 5 PIR: Harrison 21	Arena: Segafredo Arena; Referees: Manuel Mazzoni, Mark Bartoli, Denny Borgioni

=== Champions League ===
==== Regular season ====
Pos	Team	Pld	W	L	PF	PA	PD	Pts	Qualification
1	(Spain) San Pablo Burgos	6	5	1	543	470	+73	11	Advance to Playoffs
2	(Italy) Happy Casa Brindisi	6	4	2	521	508	+13	10	Advance to Playoffs
3	(Belgium) Filou Oostende	6	2	4	484	517	−33	8	
4	(Turkey) Darüşşafaka Tekfen	6	1	5	451	504	−53	7	

Source: Champions League

==== Play-offs ====
Pos	Team	Pld	W	L	PF	PA	PD	Pts	Qualification
1	(Israel) Hapoel Holon	6	4	2	472	483	−11	10	Advance to Final Eight
2	(Turkey) Pınar Karşıyaka	6	3	3	491	471	+20	9	Advance to Final Eight
3	(Italy) Happy Casa Brindisi	6	3	3	503	501	+2	9	
4	(Turkey) Tofaş	6	2	4	478	489	−11	8	

Source: Champions League

== See also ==
- 2020–21 LBA season
- 2020–21 Basketball Champions League
- 2021 Italian Basketball Cup
- 2020 Italian Basketball Supercup
