= 2020–21 Pallacanestro Trieste season =

Italian basketball season

Pallacanestro Trieste
2020-21 season
- Owner: Stefano Landi (Landi Renzo); Bartoli family (Antichi Poderi di Canossa); Enrico San Pietro (ESP SRL); Andrea Baroni (End Holding); Graziano Sassi (GS Brands)
- President: Gianluca Mauro
- Head coach: Eugenio Dalmasson
- Arena: Allianz Dome
- LBA: 7th of 15
- Playoffs: Quarterfinals
- Italian Cup: Quarterfinals
- Supercup: Group stage (2nd of 4)

The 2020–21 season is Pallacanestro Trieste's 46th in existence and the club's 3rd consecutive season in the top tier Italian basketball.

== Kit ==
Supplier: Adidas / Sponsor: Allianz

Home	Away

== Players ==
=== Current roster ===
Allianz Pallacanestro Trieste roster
Players
Coaches

Pos.	No.	Nat.	Name	Ht.	Wt.	Age
SF	0	(Italy)	Coronica, Andrea (C)	1.90 m (6 ft 3 in)	85 kg (187 lb)	33 – 19 August 1993
C	3	(United States)	Upson, DeVonte	2.06 m (6 ft 9 in)	101 kg (223 lb)	33 – 23 March 1993
PG	4	(Argentina)	Fernández, Juan	1.93 m (6 ft 4 in)	83 kg (183 lb)	36 – 22 July 1990
PG	8	(Italy)	Laquintana, Tommaso	1.88 m (6 ft 2 in)	80 kg (176 lb)	31 – 7 July 1995
C	12	(Argentina)	Delía, Marcos	2.09 m (6 ft 10 in)	111 kg (245 lb)	34 – 8 April 1992
SF	15	(United States)	Henry, Myke	1.98 m (6 ft 6 in)	108 kg (238 lb)	33 – 23 December 1992
G	18	(Italy)	Cavaliero, Daniele	1.83 m (6 ft 0 in)	83 kg (183 lb)	42 – 10 January 1984
PF	20	(Italy)	Da Ros, Matteo	2.04 m (6 ft 8 in)	93 kg (205 lb)	36 – 25 September 1989
PF	24	(Latvia)	Gražulis, Andrejs	2.02 m (6 ft 8 in)	95 kg (209 lb)	33 – 21 July 1993
SG	35	(United States)	Doyle, Milton	1.93 m (6 ft 4 in)	82 kg (181 lb)	32 – 31 October 1993
SF	44	(Italy)	Alviti, Davide	2.00 m (6 ft 7 in)	88 kg (194 lb)	29 – 5 November 1996

Head coach

- (Italy) Eugenio Dalmasson

Assistant coach(es)

- (Italy) Marco Legovich
- (Italy) Franco Ciani

Legend

- (C) Team captain
- Injured

- Roster
Updated: 17 May 2021

Note: Flags indicate national team eligibility at FIBA-sanctioned events. Players may hold other non-FIBA nationalities not displayed.

=== Depth chart ===
Pos.	Starting 5	Bench 1	Bench 2
C	DeVonte Upson	Marcos Delía
PF	Andrejs Gražulis	Matteo Da Ros
SF	Myke Henry	Davide Alviti	Andrea Coronica
SG	Milton Doyle	Daniele Cavaliero
PG	Juan Fernández	Tommaso Laquintana

5+5 format (colours: Italian or homegrown players; foreign players; young players)

=== Squad changes ===
==== In ====
No.	Pos.	Nat.	Name	Age	Moving from		Type	Ends	Transfer fee	Date	Source
24	PF	(Latvia)	Andrejs Gražulis	26	Derthona Basket	(Italy)	1 year	June 2021	Free	19 June 2020	
13	PF	(Nigeria) (United States)	Ike Udanoh	30	Reyer Venezia	(Italy)	1 year	June 2021	Free	23 June 2020	
8	PG	(Italy)	Tommaso Laquintana	24	Basket Brescia Leonessa	(Italy)	2 years	June 2022	Free	24 June 2020	
3	F/C	(United States)	DeVonte Upson	27	SIG Strasbourg	(France)	1+1 years	June 2021 + 2022	Free	3 July 2020	
44	F	(Italy)	Davide Alviti	23	Universo Treviso Basket	(Italy)	1+1 years	June 2021 + 2022	Free	8 July 2020	
15	SF	(United States)	Myke Henry	27	Oklahoma City Blue	(United States)	1 year	June 2021	Free	10 July 2020	
35	SG	(United States)	Milton Doyle	26	Windy City Bulls	(United States)	1 year	June 2021	Free	10 July 2020	
1	PG	(Italy)	Federico Mussini	24	VL Pesaro	(Italy)	1 month	November 2020	Free	9 October 2020	
12	C	(Argentina)	Marcos Delía	28	Virtus Bologna	(Italy)	3 months + 5 months	June 2021	Free	12 October 2020	
55	G/F	(Slovenia)	Jakob Čebašek	29	Šentjur	(Slovenia)	1 month	November 2020	Undisclosed	15 October 2020	
2	PF	(Croatia)	Hrvoje Perić	35	Kleb Ferrara	(Italy)	1 month	15 March 2021	Undisclosed	10 February 2021	

1. In players: Players who signed after the beginning of the season

==== Out ====
No.	Pos.	Nat.	Name	Age	Moving to		Type	Transfer fee	Date	Source
25	C	(Panama) (United States)	Akil Mitchell	27	Hapoel Gilboa Galil	(Israel)	End of contract	Free	26 May 2020	
1	F/C	(United States)	Derek Cooke	27	Hamilton Honey Badgers	(Canada)	End of contract	Free	1 July 2020	
6	PG	(Italy)	Iacopo Demarchi	21	Pallacanestro Vicenza	(Italy)	End of contract	Free	1 July 2020	
7	SF	(United States)	DeQuan Jones	27	Nishinomiya Storks	(Japan)	End of contract	Free	1 July 2020	
9	G	(Georgia (country)) (United States)	Ricky Hickman	34	Free agent		End of contract	Free	1 July 2020	
10	C	(Italy)	Riccardo Cervi	29	Virtus Roma	(Italy)	Escape option	Free	1 July 2020	
13	SF	(United States)	Deron Washington	34	Mitteldeutscher	(Germany)	End of contract	Free	1 July 2020	
44	SG	(United States)	Kodi Justice	27	Zadar	(Croatia)	End of contract	Free	1 July 2020	
3	PF	(Croatia)	Hrvoje Perić	34	Kleb Basket Ferrara	(Italy)	Mutual consent	Free	July 2020	
1	PG	(Italy)	Federico Mussini	24	Pallalcesto Amatori Udine	(Italy)	End of contract	Free	9 November 2020	
55	G/F	(Slovenia)	Jakob Čebašek	29	Dinamo București	(Romania)	End of contract	Free	9 November 2020	
13	PF	(Nigeria) (United States)	Ike Udanoh	31	SIG Strasbourg	(France)	Transfer	Undisclosed	7 January 2021	
2	PF	(Croatia)	Hrvoje Perić	35	Benedetto XIV Cento	(Italy)	End of contract	Free	15 March 2021	
7	G	(Italy)	Andrea Arnaldo	18	Falconstar Monfalcone	(Italy)	Loan contract	Undisclosed	March 2021	

1. Out players: Players who left before the end of the season

==== Confirmed ====
No.	Pos.	Nat.	Name	Age	Moving from		Type	Ends	Transfer fee	Date	Source
0	SF	(Italy)	Andrea Coronica	26	youth team		12 years	June 2021	Free	2009	
20	PF	(Italy)	Matteo Da Ros	36	Scaligera Basket Verona	(Italy)	4 + 1+1 years	June 2021 + 2022	Free	16 July 2016	
18	PG	(Italy)	Daniele Cavaliero	36	Pallacanestro Varese	(Italy)	3 + 1 year	June 2021	Free	25 April 2017	
4	PG	(Argentina) (Italy)	Juan Fernández	29	Breogán	(Spain)	3 + 2 year	June 2022	Free	23 June 2017	

==== From youth team ====
No.	Pos.	Nat.	Name	Age	Moving from	Type	Ends	Date	Source
7	G	(Italy)	Andrea Arnaldo	18	youth team	5 years	June 2025	11 August 2020	

==== Coach ====
Nat.	Name	Age.	Last team		Type	Ends	Date	Source
(Italy)	Eugenio Dalmasson	63	Reyer Venezia (W)	(Italy)	10 + 1+1	2021 + 2022	21 June 2010	

=== On loan ===
Pos.	Nat.	Name	Age	Moving from	Moving to		Date	Loan period	Contract	Ends	Source
F	(Italy)	Lodovico Deangeli	20	youth team	Amici Pallacanestro Udine	(Italy)	3 July 2020	1+1 years			
PG	(Italy)	Matteo Schina	19	youth team	Amici Pallacanestro Udine	(Italy)	18 November 2020	1 year	5 years	June 2025	

== Competitions ==
=== Supercup ===
Pos	Team	Pld	W	L	PF	PA	PD	Qualification
1	Umana Reyer Venezia	6	4	2	462	434	+28	Advance to Final Four
2	De' Longhi Treviso	6	3	3	475	459	+16	
3	Allianz Pallacanestro Trieste	6	3	3	428	467	−39	
4	Dolomiti Energia Trento	6	2	4	467	472	−5	

Source: LegaBasket Serie A
Rules for classification: All points scored in extra period(s) were not counted in the standings, nor for any tie-break situation.

=== Italian Cup ===
Trieste qualified to the 2021 Italian Basketball Cup by ending the first half of the LBA season in the 7th position. They played the quarterfinal against the 2nd ranking Happy Casa Brindisi.

12 February 2021 Quarterfinals	Happy Casa Brindisi	93–81	Allianz Pallacanestro Trieste	Assago (Milan)
18:00	Scoring by quarter: 25-18, 18-20, 23-23, 27-20
Rai Sport, Eurosport	Pts: Gaspardo 17; Rebs: Udom 9 Asts: Thompson 9 PIR: Udom 23	Boxscore	Pts: Doyle 16; Rebs: Delía 8 Asts: Doyle 10; PIR: Henry	Arena: Mediolanum Forum; Referees: Carmelo Paternicò, Beniamino Manuel Attard, Denny Borgioni

=== Serie A ===
==== Regular season ====
Pos	Team	Pld	W	L	PF	PA	PD	Qualification
5	Banco di Sardegna Sassari	28	18	10	2527	2437	+90	Qualification to Playoffs
6	De' Longhi Treviso	28	14	14	2353	2468	−115	Qualification to Playoffs
7	Allianz Pallacanestro Trieste	28	14	14	2253	2249	+4	Qualification to Playoffs
8	Dolomiti Energia Trento	28	13	15	2191	2228	−37	Qualification to Playoffs
9	Germani Basket Brescia	28	11	17	2299	2389	−90	

Updated to match(es) played on 10 May 2021. Source: LBA

==== Playoffs ====
===== Quarterfinals =====
13 May 2021 Game 1	Happy Casa Brindisi	85–64 (Series: 1-0)	Allianz Pallacanestro Trieste	Brindisi
20:45 (CET)	Scoring by quarter: 21-18, 22-10, 14-17, 28-19
Rai Sport, Eurosport Player	Pts: Harrison 16; Rebs: Perkins 10; Asts: Thompson 6 PIR: Willis 21	Boxscore	Pts: Doyle 12; Rebs: Alviti 6 Asts: Da Ros, Doyle 2 PIR: Upson 19	Arena: PalaPentassuglia; Referees: Carmelo Lo Guzzo, Denis Quarta, Christian Borgo

14 May 2021 Game 2	Happy Casa Brindisi	86–54 (Series: 2-0)	Allianz Pallacanestro Trieste	Brindisi
20:45 (CET)	Scoring by quarter: 25-11, 15-14, 28-16, 18-13
Eurosport Player	Pts: Perkins 17; Rebs: Krubally 10; Asts: Harrison 7 PIR: Perkins 20	Boxscore	Pts: Alviti 14; Rebs: Upson, Delía, Henry 4 Asts: Fernández, Cavaliero 3 PIR: Alviti 14	Arena: PalaPentassuglia; Referees: Michele Rossi, Alessandro Martolini, Giacomo Dori

17 May 2021 Game 3	Allianz Pallacanestro Trieste	77–79 (Series: 0-3)	Happy Casa Brindisi	Trieste
19:00 (CET)	Scoring by quarter: 20-25, 21-22, 18-16, 18-16
Eurosport 2, Eurosport Player	Pts: Henry 22; Rebs: Upson, Delía, Henry 7 Asts: Delía 3 PIR: Henry 24	Boxscore	Pts: Perkins 19; Rebs: Willis 8 Asts: Thompson 5 PIR: Willis 30	Arena: Allianz Dome; Referees: Carmelo Paternicò, Alessandro Vicino, Alessandro Nicolini

== See also ==
- 2020–21 LBA season
- 2021 Italian Basketball Cup
- 2020 Italian Basketball Supercup
