= 2021 Italian Basketball Cup =

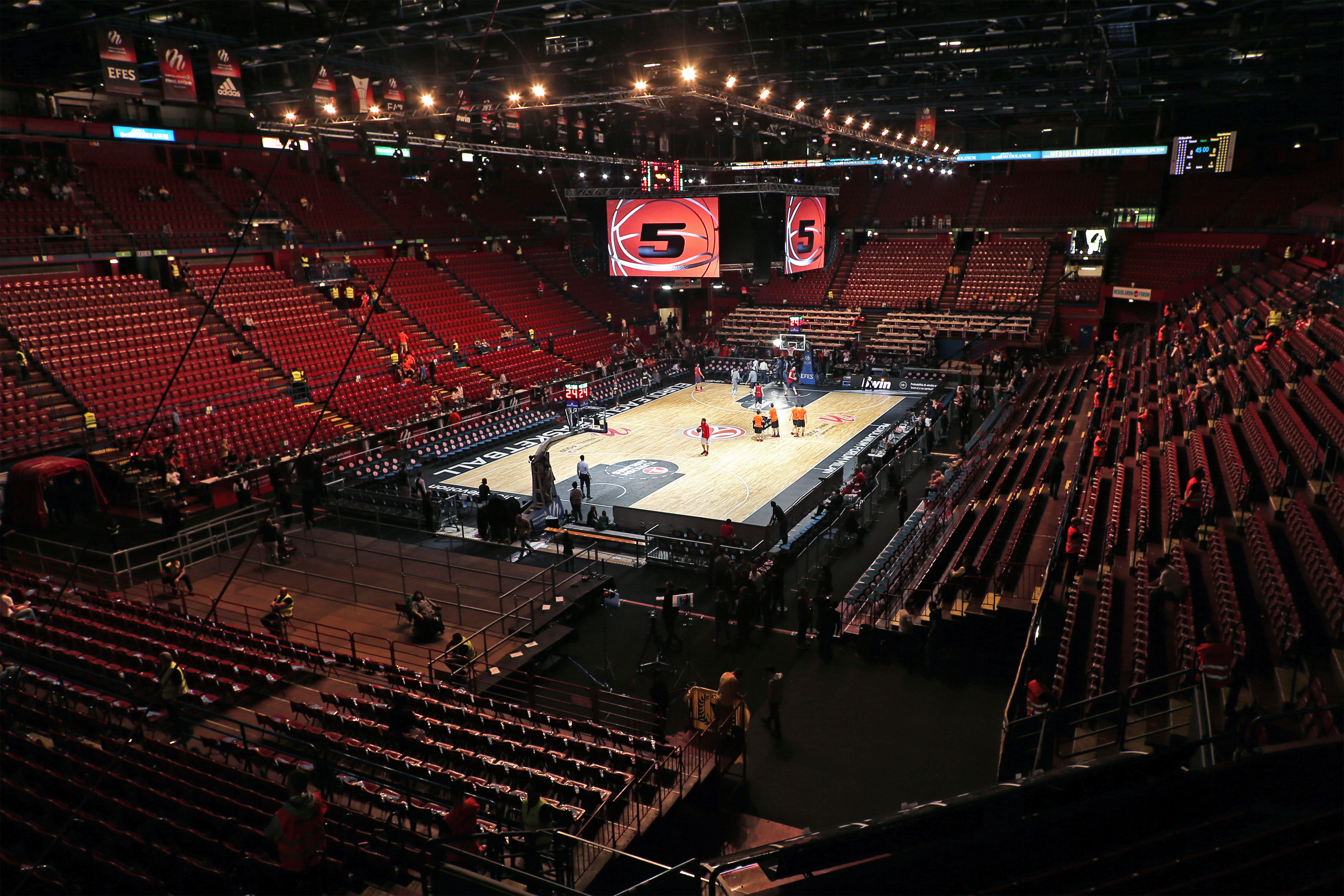
- The Mediolanum Forum hosted the Cup

Tournament details
- Country: Italy
- City: Assago (Milan)
- Venue(s): Mediolanum Forum
- Dates: 11–14 February 2021
- Teams: 8
- Defending champions: Umana Reyer Venezia

Final positions
- Champions: AX Armani Exchange Milano
- Runners-up: Carpegna Prosciutto Pesaro
- Semifinalists: Umana Reyer Venezia; Happy Casa Brindisi

Tournament statistics
- Matches played: 7

Awards
- MVP: (Italy) Luigi Datome (AX Armani Exchange Milano)

The 2021 Italian Basketball Cup, known as the Frecciarossa Final Eight 2021 for sponsorship reasons, was the 45th edition of Italy's national cup tournament. The competition is managed by the Lega Basket for LBA clubs. The tournament was played from 11 to 14 February 2021 in Assago (Milan), at the end of the first half of the 2020–21 LBA season.

Umana Reyer Venezia were the defending champions.

All times are in Central European Time (UTC+01:00).

== Qualification ==
Qualified for the tournament are selected based on their position on the league table at the end of the first half of the 2020–21 LBA regular season.

Pos	Team	Pld	W	L	PF	PA	PD	Qualification
1	AX Armani Exchange Milano	14	13	1	1237	1031	+206	Qualified as seeded teams
2	Happy Casa Brindisi	13	10	3	1119	1044	+75	Qualified as seeded teams
3	Banco di Sardegna Sassari	14	9	5	1261	1223	+38	Qualified as seeded teams
4	Segafredo Virtus Bologna	14	9	5	1184	1080	+104	Qualified as seeded teams
5	Umana Reyer Venezia	14	8	6	1106	1081	+25	Qualified as non-seeded teams
6	Carpegna Prosciutto Basket Pesaro	14	7	7	1166	1152	+14	Qualified as non-seeded teams
7	Allianz Pallacanestro Trieste	13	6	7	983	1004	−21	Qualified as non-seeded teams
8	UNAHOTELS Reggio Emilia	14	6	8	1069	1106	−37	Qualified as non-seeded teams

Updated to match(es) played on 10 January 2021. Source: LBA

== Bracket ==
Quarterfinals; 11–12 February
1	AX Armani Exchange Milano	80
8	UNAHOTELS Reggio Emilia	52
4	Segafredo Virtus Bologna	82
5	Umana Reyer Venezia	89
2	Happy Casa Brindisi	93
7	Allianz Pallacanestro Trieste	81
3	Banco di Sardegna Sassari	110
6	Carpegna Prosciutto Pesaro	115

Semifinals; 13 February
AX Armani Exchange Milano	96
Umana Reyer Venezia	65
Happy Casa Brindisi	69
Carpegna Prosciutto Pesaro	74

Final; 14 February
AX Armani Exchange Milano	87
Carpegna Prosciutto Pesaro	59

== Quarterfinals ==
=== AX Armani Exchange Milano vs. UNAHOTELS Reggio Emilia ===
11 February 2021	AX Armani Exchange Milano	80–52	UNAHOTELS Reggio Emilia	Assago (Milan)
18:00	Scoring by quarter: 19–10, 22–12, 18–9, 21–21
Rai Sport, Eurosport	Pts: Punter, LeDay 15; Rebs: Shields 9 Asts: Rodríguez 9 PIR: LeDay 20	Boxscore	Pts: Baldi Rossi 13; Rebs: Diouf 9 Asts: Baldi Rossi 5 PIR: Baldi Rossi 13	Arena: Mediolanum Forum; Referees: Roberto Begnis, Mark Bartoli, Fabrizio Paglialunga

Starters:			Pts	Reb	Ast
PG	23	(United States) Malcolm Delaney	3	3	0
SG	0	(United States) Kevin Punter	15	0	2
SF	9	(Italy) Riccardo Moraschini	3	2	0
PF	2	(United States) Zach LeDay	15	7	1
C	42	(United States) Kyle Hines	8	7	1
Reserves:					
SG	3	(Italy) Davide Moretti	3	1	2
PG	13	(Spain) Sergio Rodríguez	4	2	9
C	19	(Italy) Paul Biligha	6	3	0
PG	20	(Italy) Andrea Cinciarini	5	3	2
SF	31	(Denmark) Shavon Shields	6	9	1
PF	70	(Italy) Luigi Datome	2	2	0
C	81	(Poland) Jakub Wojciechowski	10	5	0
Head coach:
(Italy) Ettore Messina

AX Armani Exchange Milano	UNAHOTELS Reggio Emilia

Starters:			Pts	Reb	Ast
PG	7	(Italy) Leonardo Candi	6	2	3
SG	11	(United States) Brandon Taylor	5	1	0
SF	77	(Czech Republic) Tomáš Kyzlink	8	3	1
PF	8	(Italy) Filippo Baldi Rossi	13	6	5
C	35	(Italy) Mouhamet Diouf	8	9	0
Reserves:					
SG	3	(Finland) Petteri Koponen	9	4	1
SF	5	(United States) Josh Bostic	1	2	1
SG	9	(Italy) Carlo Porfilio	0	0	0
SG	14	(Italy) Marco Giannini	0	0	0
SG	32	(Italy) Federico Bonacini	2	1	3
Head coach:
(Italy) Antimo Martino

=== Segafredo Virtus Bologna vs. Umana Reyer Venezia ===
11 February 2021	Segafredo Virtus Bologna	82–89	Umana Reyer Venezia	Assago (Milan)
20:45	Scoring by quarter: 16–23, 22–18, 23–24, 21–24
Rai Sport, Eurosport	Pts: Teodosić 15; Rebs: Hunter 7 Asts: Teodosić 6 PIR: Teodosić 19	Boxscore	Pts: Bramos 23; Rebs: Bramos 13; Asts: De Nicolao 5 PIR: Bramos 31	Arena: Mediolanum Forum; Referees: Tolga Sahin, Carmelo Lo Guzzo, Guido Giovannetti

Starters:			Pts	Reb	Ast
PG	44	(Serbia) Miloš Teodosić	15	5	6
SG	9	(Serbia) Stefan Marković	10	4	3
SF	34	(United States) Kyle Weems	14	4	2
PF	11	(Italy) Giampaolo Ricci	11	3	0
C	45	(United States) Julian Gamble	5	4	1
Reserves:					
C	0	(Italy) Amedeo Tessitori	2	1	0
PG	1	(Italy) Lorenzo Deri	DNP		
SG	3	(Italy) Marco Belinelli	DNP		
PF	7	(Bosnia and Herzegovina) Amar Alibegović	0	0	0
PG	14	(United States) Josh Adams	9	1	2
C	21	(United States) Vince Hunter	14	7	0
SF	55	(Italy) Awudu Abass	2	2	2
Head coach:
(Serbia) Aleksandar Đorđević

Segafredo Virtus Bologna	Umana Reyer Venezia

Starters:			Pts	Reb	Ast
PG	10	(Italy) Andrea De Nicolao	10	3	5
SG	7	(Italy) Stefano Tonut	22	3	1
SF	6	(Greece) Michael Bramos	23	13	0
PF	5	(United States) Julyan Stone	0	4	2
C	50	(United States) Mitchell Watt	12	8	0
Reserves:					
SG	3	(Italy) Davide Casarin	DNP		
PF	9	(United States) Austin Daye	9	6	2
SG	12	(Italy) Luca Campogrande	DNP		
PG	15	(United States) Wes Clark	8	0	4
SG	21	(United States) Jeremy Chappell	0	1	0
C	22	(Italy) Valerio Mazzola	5	1	0
SF	30	(Argentina) Bruno Cerella	DNP		
Head coach:
(Italy) Walter De Raffaele

=== Happy Casa Brindisi vs. Allianz Pallacanestro Trieste ===
12 February 2021	Happy Casa Brindisi	93–81	Allianz Pallacanestro Trieste	Assago (Milan)
18:00	Scoring by quarter: 25–18, 18–20, 23–23, 27–20
Rai Sport, Eurosport	Pts: Gaspardo 17; Rebs: Udom 9 Asts: Thompson 9 PIR: Udom 23	Boxscore	Pts: Doyle 16; Rebs: Delía 8 Asts: Doyle 10; PIR: Henry	Arena: Mediolanum Forum; Referees: Carmelo Paternicò, Beniamino Manuel Attard, Denny Borgioni

Starters:			Pts	Reb	Ast
PG	15	(United States) Darius Thompson	11	5	9
SG	31	(United States) James Bell	14	3	2
SF	22	(Italy) Mattia Udom	12	9	5
PF	10	(Italy) Raphael Gaspardo	17	6	0
C	33	(United States) Nick Perkins	12	2	2
Reserves:					
SF	3	(Italy) Felipe Motta	DNP		
C	5	(The Gambia) Ousman Krubally	8	4	2
PG	6	(Italy) Alessandro Zanelli	3	0	4
SG	9	(Italy) Riccardo Visconti	12	0	1
C	18	(Italy) Riccardo Cattapan	DNP		
SG	21	(Italy) Alessandro Guido	DNP		
PF	35	(United States) Derek Willis	4	1	0
Head coach:
(Italy) Francesco Vitucci

Happy Casa Brindisi	Allianz Pallacanestro Trieste

Starters:			Pts	Reb	Ast
PG	4	(Argentina) Juan Fernández	9	1	3
SG	35	(United States) Milton Doyle	16	5	10
SF	15	(United States) Myke Henry	15	4	2
PF	20	(Italy) Matteo Da Ros	20	2	2
C	12	(Argentina) Marcos Delía	12	8	2
Reserves:					
SF	0	(Italy) Andrea Coronica	DNP		
PF	2	(Croatia) Hrvoje Perić	8	1	0
C	3	(United States) DeVonte Upson	12	4	1
SG	7	(Italy) Andrea Arnaldo	DNP		
PG	8	(Italy) Tommaso Laquintana	5	1	5
SG	18	(Italy) Daniele Cavaliero	0	0	0
SF	44	(Italy) Davide Alviti	4	5	0
Head coach:
(Italy) Eugenio Dalmasson

=== Banco di Sardegna Sassari vs. Carpegna Prosciutto Pesaro ===
12 February 2021	Banco di Sardegna Sassari	110–115(OT)	Carpegna Prosciutto Pesaro	Assago (Milan)
20:45	Scoring by quarter: 26–24, 27–25, 23–21, 23–29, Overtime: 11–16
Rai Sport, Eurosport	Pts: Bendžius 22; Rebs: Spissu 10; Asts: Spissu 9 PIR: Spissu 34	Boxscore	Pts: J. Robinson 27; Rebs: Filipovity 13; Asts: J. Robinson 27; PIR: Drell	Arena: Mediolanum Forum; Referees: Michele Rossi, Lorenzo Baldini, Christian Borgo

Starters:			Pts	Reb	Ast
PG	0	(Italy) Marco Spissu	20	10	9
SG	22	(Italy) Stefano Gentile	15	3	4
SF	14	(United States) Jason Burnell	17	5	2
PF	20	(Lithuania) Eimantas Bendžius	22	4	1
C	2	(Croatia) Miro Bilan	19	7	2
Reserves:					
PF	3	(Estonia) Kaspar Treier	3	1	0
PG	5	(Italy) Massimo Chessa	DNP		
SG	6	(Croatia) Filip Krušlin	8	1	3
PF	7	(United States) Ethan Happ	4	5	1
PG	10	(Croatia) Toni Katić	2	3	2
PG	13	(Italy) Marco Antonio Re	DNP		
C	21	(Italy) Luca Gandini	DNP		
Head coach:
(Italy) Gianmarco Pozzecco

Banco di Sardegna Sassari	Carpegna Prosciutto Pesaro

Starters:			Pts	Reb	Ast
PG	12	(United States) Justin Robinson	27	2	6
SG	5	(Italy) Ariel Filloy	7	4	4
SF	3	(Estonia) Henri Drell	23	5	2
PF	25	(Hungary) Márkó Filipovity	12	13	2
C	8	(United States) Tyler Cain	3	7	4
Reserves:					
SG	15	(Italy) Matteo Tambone	3	0	0
SF	18	(Italy) Edin Mujakovic	DNP		
SG	22	(United States) Gerald Robinson	15	0	4
C	24	(Italy) Beniamino Basso	0	0	0
PF	33	(Italy) Michele Serpilli	DNP		
C	41	(Italy) Simone Zanotti	6	2	0
SF	82	(Argentina) Carlos Delfino	19	5	2
Head coach:
(Croatia) Jasmin Repeša

== Semifinals ==
=== AX Armani Exchange Milano vs. Umana Reyer Venezia ===
13 February 2021	AX Armani Exchange Milano	96–65	Umana Reyer Venezia	Assago (Milan)
18:00	Scoring by quarter: 20–25, 22–13, 30–11, 24–16
Rai Sport, Eurosport	Pts: Rodríguez 22; Rebs: Hines 10; Asts: Rodríguez 9 PIR: Rodríguez 30	Boxscore	Pts: Watt 18; Rebs: Watt 6 Asts: De Nicolao 5 PIR: Watt 20	Arena: Mediolanum Forum; Referees: Saverio Lanzarini, Manuel Mazzoni, Alessandro Vicino

Starters:			Pts	Reb	Ast
PG	23	(United States) Malcolm Delaney	4	2	3
SG	0	(United States) Kevin Punter	2	2	3
SF	31	(Denmark) Shavon Shields	12	2	2
PF	2	(United States) Zach LeDay	16	4	0
C	42	(United States) Kyle Hines	14	10	2
Reserves:					
SG	3	(Italy) Davide Moretti	0	0	1
SF	9	(Italy) Riccardo Moraschini	3	1	1
PG	13	(Spain) Sergio Rodríguez	22	1	9
C	19	(Italy) Paul Biligha	6	3	0
PG	20	(Italy) Andrea Cinciarini	2	0	1
PF	70	(Italy) Luigi Datome	13	3	0
C	81	(Poland) Jakub Wojciechowski	2	2	0
Head coach:
(Italy) Ettore Messina

AX Armani Exchange Milano	Umana Reyer Venezia

Starters:			Pts	Reb	Ast
PG	10	(Italy) Andrea De Nicolao	7	0	5
SG	7	(Italy) Stefano Tonut	14	2	3
SF	6	(Greece) Michael Bramos	7	3	1
PF	5	(United States) Julyan Stone	3	4	2
C	50	(United States) Mitchell Watt	18	6	0
Reserves:					
SG	3	(Italy) Davide Casarin	4	1	0
PF	9	(United States) Austin Daye	2	4	1
SG	12	(Italy) Luca Campogrande	2	0	1
PG	15	(United States) Wes Clark	3	1	0
SG	21	(United States) Jeremy Chappell	5	3	0
C	22	(Italy) Valerio Mazzola	0	1	1
SF	30	(Argentina) Bruno Cerella	0	0	0
Head coach:
(Italy) Walter De Raffaele

=== Happy Casa Brindisi vs. Carpegna Prosciutto Pesaro ===
13 February 2021	Happy Casa Brindisi	69–74	Carpegna Prosciutto Pesaro	Assago (Milan)
20:45	Scoring by quarter: 12–15, 16–26, 17–11, 24–22
Rai Sport, Eurosport	Pts: Thompson 19; Rebs: Udom, Willis 7 Asts: Thompson 7 PIR: Thompson 24	Boxscore	Pts: J. Robinson 23; Rebs: Cain 14; Asts: J. Robinson 4 PIR: J. Robinson 23	Arena: Mediolanum Forum; Referees: Carmelo Paternicò, Alessandro Martolini, Andrea Bongiorni

Starters:			Pts	Reb	Ast
PG	15	(United States) Darius Thompson	19	3	7
SG	31	(United States) James Bell	3	1	3
SF	22	(Italy) Mattia Udom	9	7	1
PF	10	(Italy) Raphael Gaspardo	6	5	1
C	33	(United States) Nick Perkins	16	6	1
Reserves:					
SF	3	(Italy) Felipe Motta	DNP		
C	5	(The Gambia) Ousman Krubally	1	3	0
PG	6	(Italy) Alessandro Zanelli	3	2	1
SG	9	(Italy) Riccardo Visconti	8	2	0
C	18	(Italy) Riccardo Cattapan	DNP		
SG	21	(Italy) Alessandro Guido	DNP		
PF	35	(United States) Derek Willis	4	7	1
Head coach:
(Italy) Francesco Vitucci

Happy Casa Brindisi	Carpegna Prosciutto Pesaro

Starters:			Pts	Reb	Ast
SG	5	(Italy) Ariel Filloy	8	3	2
SG	22	(United States) Gerald Robinson	5	4	3
SF	3	(Estonia) Henri Drell	3	1	1
PF	25	(Hungary) Márkó Filipovity	3	5	1
C	8	(United States) Tyler Cain	6	14	2
Reserves:					
PG	12	(United States) Justin Robinson	23	1	4
SG	15	(Italy) Matteo Tambone	6	2	0
SF	18	(Italy) Edin Mujakovic	DNP		
C	24	(Italy) Beniamino Basso	DNP		
PF	33	(Italy) Michele Serpilli	DNP		
C	41	(Italy) Simone Zanotti	10	1	0
SF	82	(Argentina) Carlos Delfino	10	4	3
Head coach:
(Croatia) Jasmin Repeša

== Final ==
=== AX Armani Exchange Milano vs. Umana Reyer Venezia ===
14 February 2021	AX Armani Exchange Milano	87–59	Carpegna Prosciutto Pesaro	Assago (Milan)
18:15	Scoring by quarter: 21–15, 27–6, 26–15, 13–23
Rai Sport, Eurosport	Pts: Datome 15; Rebs: Hines 7 Asts: Rodríguez 8 PIR: Datome 26	Boxscore	Pts: Cain 15; Rebs: Cain 12; Asts: J. Robinson 4 PIR: Cain 21	Arena: Mediolanum Forum; Referees: Tolga Sahin, Roberto Begnis, Guido Giovannetti

Starters:			Pts	Reb	Ast
PG	23	(United States) Malcolm Delaney	10	3	2
SG	0	(United States) Kevin Punter	13	3	2
SF	31	(Denmark) Shavon Shields	9	4	4
PF	2	(United States) Zach LeDay	13	2	0
C	42	(United States) Kyle Hines	5	7	1
Reserves:					
SG	3	(Italy) Davide Moretti	5	1	0
SF	9	(Italy) Riccardo Moraschini	7	4	2
PG	13	(Spain) Sergio Rodríguez	1	1	8
C	19	(Italy) Paul Biligha	7	1	1
PG	20	(Italy) Andrea Cinciarini	2	1	0
PF	70	(Italy) Luigi Datome	15	5	2
C	81	(Poland) Jakub Wojciechowski	0	0	0
Head coach:
(Italy) Ettore Messina

Milano	Statistics	Pesaro
22/38 (57.9%)	2 point field goals	19/38 (50.0%)
10/22 (45.5%)	3 point field goals	5/25 (20.0%)
13/15 (86.7%)	Free throws	6/11 (54.5%)
38	Rebounds	34
22	Assists	16
9	Steals	4
12	Turnovers	14
1	Blocks	1

Starters:			Pts	Reb	Ast
PG	12	(United States) Justin Robinson	4	2	4
SG	5	(Italy) Ariel Filloy	5	2	2
SF	3	(Estonia) Henri Drell	12	4	0
PF	25	(Hungary) Márkó Filipovity	12	5	0
C	8	(United States) Tyler Cain	15	12	1
Reserves:					
SG	15	(Italy) Matteo Tambone	4	1	3
SF	18	(Italy) Edin Mujakovic	DNP		
SG	22	(United States) Gerald Robinson	0	1	3
C	24	(Italy) Beniamino Basso	DNP		
PF	33	(Italy) Michele Serpilli	0	0	0
C	41	(Italy) Simone Zanotti	2	0	0
SF	82	(Argentina) Carlos Delfino	5	2	3
Head coach:
(Croatia) Jasmin Repeša

2021 Italian Cup champions
AX Armani Exchange Milano
7th title

== Awards ==
Premio	Giocatore	Squadra
MVP	(Italy) Luigi Datome	AX Armani Exchange Milano
Best offensive player	(Estonia) Henri Drell	Carpegna Prosciutto Pesaro
Best shooter	(Italy) Luigi Datome	AX Armani Exchange Milano
Best assist man	(Spain) Sergio Rodríguez	AX Armani Exchange Milano
