= Simone Zanotti =

Italian basketball player (born 1992)

No. 41 – Pistoia Basket 2000
- Position: Power forward
- League: Serie A2

Personal information
- Born: December 1, 1992 (age 33) Turin, Italy
- Listed height: 6 ft 8 in (2.03 m)
- Listed weight: 234 lb (106 kg)

Career information
- Playing career: 2010–present

Career history
- 2010–2011: Pall. Reggiana
- 2011–2012: Ruvo di Puglia
- 2012–2013: Pall. Lucca
- 2013–2014: PMS Torino
- 2014–2015: Garcia Moreno 1947
- 2015–2016: Lions Bisceglie
- 2016: Pavia Basket
- 2016–2017: Nuova Pall. Monteroni
- 2017–2018: P.S.E. Basket
- 2018–2022: V.L. Pesaro
- 2022–2023: Napoli Basket
- 2023: Basket Torino
- 2023–2024: Vanoli Cremona
- 2024–2025: Victoria Libertas Pesaro
- 2025–present: Pistoia Basket 2000

Simone Zanotti (born December 31, 1992) is an Italian basketball player for Pistoia Basket 2000 of the Italian Serie A2.

== Professional career ==
After playing in the youth team of Pallacanestro Reggiana, Zanotti played for Ruvo di Puglia in 2011-12 and later for Lucca and Bisceglie.

After playing with Monteroni, in the 2016-17 year and in Porto Sant'Elpidio, in 2017–2018, Zanotti makes his debut in Serie A with the Victoria Libertas Pesaro in the 2018-19 season when he signs with the team he will remain for four seasons with, conquering, over the years, the season'sCoppa Italia finals and the qualifications for the playoffs in the 2020-21 season.

On July 1, 2022, he signed with Napoli Basket. He made his debut on October 2, 2022, when he scored 2 points and got 5 rebounds in 11 minutes in a loss against Virtus Bologna.

On April 20, 2023, he signed with Basket Torino.

On July 16, 2023, he signed with Vanoli Cremona of the Lega Basket Serie A (LBA).

On June 26, 2024, he signed with Victoria Libertas Pesaro of the Italian Lega Basket Serie A (LBA).

On July 28, 2025, he signed with Pistoia Basket 2000 of the Italian Serie A2.

== National team career ==
He played four games as a player of the Italy's national basketball team. He made every appearance in the EuroBasket 2022 qualifications.

19 February 2021 EuroBasket 2022 qualification	Italy	101–105OT	Estonia	Perm'
		Boxscore
Note: Points: 0

21 February 2021 EuroBasket 2022 qualification	North Macedonia	87–81	Italy	Perm'
		Boxscore
Note: Points: 0

19 June 2021 Exhibition game	Italy	83–71	Czech Republic	Hamburg
		Boxscore
Note: Points: 0

20 June 2021 Exhibition game	Germany	91–79	Italy	Hamburg
		Boxscore
Note: Points: 0
