= Nicola Brienza =

Italian basketball coach

New Basket Brindisi
- Position: Head coach
- League: Serie A2

Personal information
- Born: 25 January 1980 (age 46) Cantù, Como, Italy
- Coaching career: 2004–present

Career history

Coaching
- 2004–2016: Pallacanestro Cantù (assistant)
- 2016: Pallacanestro Cantù
- 2016–2017: Lugano Tigers
- 2017–2018: Orlandina (assistant)
- 2018–2019: Pallacanestro Cantù (assistant)
- 2019: Pallacanestro Cantù
- 2019–2021: Aquila Basket Trento
- 2021–2024: Pistoia Basket 2000
- 2024–2026: Pallacanestro Cantù
- 2026–present: New Basket Brindisi

Career highlights
- LBA Coach of the Year (2024)

Nicola Brienza (born 25 January 1980) is an Italian professional basketball coach for New Basket Brindisi of Italian Serie A2.

== Coaching career ==
Nicola Brienza started his coach-career managing the youth sector of Pallacanestro Cantù and in 2004 he became assistant coach of the club in Serie A until 2016, when he was named head coach for two matches in the interim between coaches Fabio Corbani and Sergei Bazarevich, starting with a home victory against Aquila Basket Trento. He remained as assistant coach to Sergei Bazarevich until the end of the season.

On 17 June 2016 he became head coach for the Swiss club Lugano Tigers in the Swiss Basketball League. Nicola lead the team to the third place in the league, only losing 3-2 against BBC Monthey in the semi-final.

On 12 July 2017 he came back to Italy as assistant coach for Orlandina Basket in Serie A.

On 12 June 2018 Brienza signed again an assistant coach for his first club Cantù until January 2019, when Evgeniy Pashutin resigned, he was named head coach of the club. With a 9-4 record, the team topped the second round chart after being in the bottom position after the first round, reaching the 7th place but being left out from playoffs due to head-to-head games record.

On 10 June 2019 Brienza was named new head coach of Aquila Basket Trento. In the 2019-2020 season, the team reached EuroCup Basketball Top 16 and was ranked seventh in the domestic league when the season was suspended due to COVID-19 pandemic. In the 2020-2021 season, Aquila Basket Trento qualified for the second year in a row for EuroCup Top 16, after winning the first six matches of the competition. Nonetheless, Brienza parted ways with Trento on 31 January 2021 after losing six matches in a row in the domestic league, leaving the team in eleventh position, despite being still fighting for a spot in the EuroCup Final 8.

On 26 June 2021 Brienza signs with Pistoia Basket 2000. The team immediately wins the 2021 LBA Supercup, reaches an honorable 3rd place in Serie A2 2021-2022 and loses in the fifth game of semifinals against future champions Scaligera Verona. In Serie A2 2022-2023, Pistoia qualifies as second in regular season and after a fantastic run against Piacenza and favorite Pallacanestro Cantù, defeats Torino and qualifies for the 2023-2024 Serie A1 Basket. In Serie A 2023-2024 Pistoia, despite being considered as underdog in the summer power rankings, in February qualifies for Italy Cup Final 8 and later reaches an historic sixth place, qualifying for Serie A playoffs. On 15 May 2024, Brienza is awarded with 2023-2024 LBA Coach of the Year trophy.

On June 20, 2024, he signed with Pallacanestro Cantù (LBA).
