= Josh Bostic =

American basketball player (born 1987)

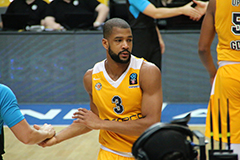

Houston Rockets
- Title: Assistant coach
- League: NBA

Personal information
- Born: May 12, 1987 (age 39) Columbus, Ohio, U.S.
- Listed height: 6 ft 5 in (1.96 m)
- Listed weight: 225 lb (102 kg)

Career information
- High school: Westland (Galloway, Ohio)
- College: Findlay (2005–2009)
- NBA draft: 2009: undrafted
- Playing career: 2009–2023
- Position: Small forward
- Number: 3
- Coaching career: 2023–present

Career history

Playing
- 2009–2010: Kyoto Hannaryz
- 2010–2011: New Mexico Thunderbirds
- 2011–2012: Liège
- 2012–2013: Belfius Mons-Hainaut
- 2013: Élan Chalon
- 2013–2014: Spartak Saint Petersburg
- 2014–2015: Grand Rapids Drive
- 2015: Spirou
- 2016: VEF Rīga
- 2016–2017: Juvecaserta
- 2017–2018: Zadar
- 2018: Dinamo Sassari
- 2018–2020: Arka Gdynia
- 2020–2021: Reggio Emilia
- 2021: New Basket Brindisi
- 2022–2023: Anwil Włocławek
- 2023: CSM Oradea

Coaching
- 2023–present: Houston Rockets (player development)

Career highlights
- All-PLK Team (2019); NABC Division II Player of the Year (2009); NCAA Division II champion (2009); NCAA Division II Tournament MVP (2009); GLIAC Player of the Year (2009)
- Stats at Basketball Reference

Joshua Lamont Bostic (born May 12, 1987) is an American former professional basketball player and current coach. He currently serves as an assistant coach for the Houston Rockets of the National Basketball Association (NBA).

== College career ==
Bostic went to the University of Findlay and wrapped up his college career as NABC NCAA Division II National Player of the Year, Division II Bulletin Player of the Year, Midwest Region Player of the Year and Great Lakes Intercollegiate Athletic Conference (GLIAC) Player of the Year. He led the Findlay Oilers to winning the 2009 NCAA Division 2 championship, averaging 18.6 points, 6.2 rebounds, 2.9 assists and 2.4 steals a contest during the 2008–09 season.

== Professional career ==
Bostic went undrafted in the 2009 NBA draft. In August 2009, he signed with Kyoto Hannaryz of Japan for the 2009–10 season.

On November 1, 2010, Bostic was selected by the New Mexico Thunderbirds in the third round of the 2010 NBA D-League Draft.

On August 17, 2011, Bostic signed a one-year deal with Liège Basket of Belgium and earned 2012 Eurobasket.com All-Belgian League 1st Team honors. On June 7, 2012, he signed a two-year deal with Belfius Mons-Hainaut. He left them after one season.

On June 24, 2013, he signed a one-year deal with Élan Chalon of France. On November 11, 2013, he parted ways with Chalon. On November 27, 2013, he signed with Spartak Saint Petersburg of Russia for the rest of the season.

On September 25, 2014, Bostic signed with the Detroit Pistons. However, he was later waived by the Pistons on October 20, 2014. On November 1, 2014, he was acquired by the Grand Rapids Drive as an affiliate player. On January 7, 2015, he was waived by the Drive. The next day, he signed with Spirou Charleroi of the Belgian League for the rest of the season.

On February 3, 2016, he signed with VEF Rīga of Latvia for the rest of the season.

On August 26, 2016, Bostic signed with Juvecaserta Basket of Italy for the 2016–17 season.

On October 18, 2017, Bostic signed with Zadar of Croatia for the rest of the 2017–18 season. He played a great half-season at Zadar during which he was named ABA League MVP of December. On January 29, 2018, he left Zadar and signed with Dinamo Sassari of Italy for the rest of the season.

On August 4, 2020, Bostic returned to Italy and signed a one-year deal with Reggio Emilia in the Italian Lega Basket Serie A.

On February 22, 2021, before the end of the season, he transferred to New Basket Brindisi.

On June 8, 2022, he has signed with Anwil Włocławek of the Polish Basketball League.

== Post-playing career ==
In October 2023, Bostic joined the Houston Rockets as a player development coach. On September 22, 2025, Bostic was promoted to the role of assistant coach for the 2025–26 NBA season.
