= Fernando Marino =

16th President of Lega Basket
- In office 1 July 2014 – 15 April 2016
- Preceded by: Valentino Renzi
- Succeeded by: Egidio Bianchi

Personal details
- Born: 6 August 1963 (age 62) Martina Franca, Apulia, Italy
- Profession: Entrepreneur

Fernando Marino (born 6 August 1963) is an Italian entrepreneur and the current president of New Basket Brindisi.

== Biography ==
=== Early career ===
He graduated in Economics from University of Bari "Aldo Moro", and became an entrepreneur in the automotive industry. After several years working in the family car dealership of Ford Motor Company, in 1995 he created the group "Emmeauto Ltd".

=== New Basket Brindisi ===
In 2011 becomes part of the group of owners of New Basket Brindisi, becoming president of the club at the beginning of the 2012-2013 season of Lega Basket Serie A.

=== Lega Basket ===
In the assembly of the Lega Basket of 13 June 2014 he was unanimously appointed president of the Lega, replacing the outgoing Valentino Renzi. He officially held the position of chairman from 1 July that year. On 15 April 2016 he ended the mandate prematurely, expiring in June that year, due to his candidacy for mayor of the city of Brindisi, in the south of Italy and the home-city of the club of which he is president.

Preceded by Valentino Renzi	President of Lega Basket; 2014–2016	Succeeded by Egidio Bianchi
