= D'Angelo Harrison =

American basketball player (born 1993)

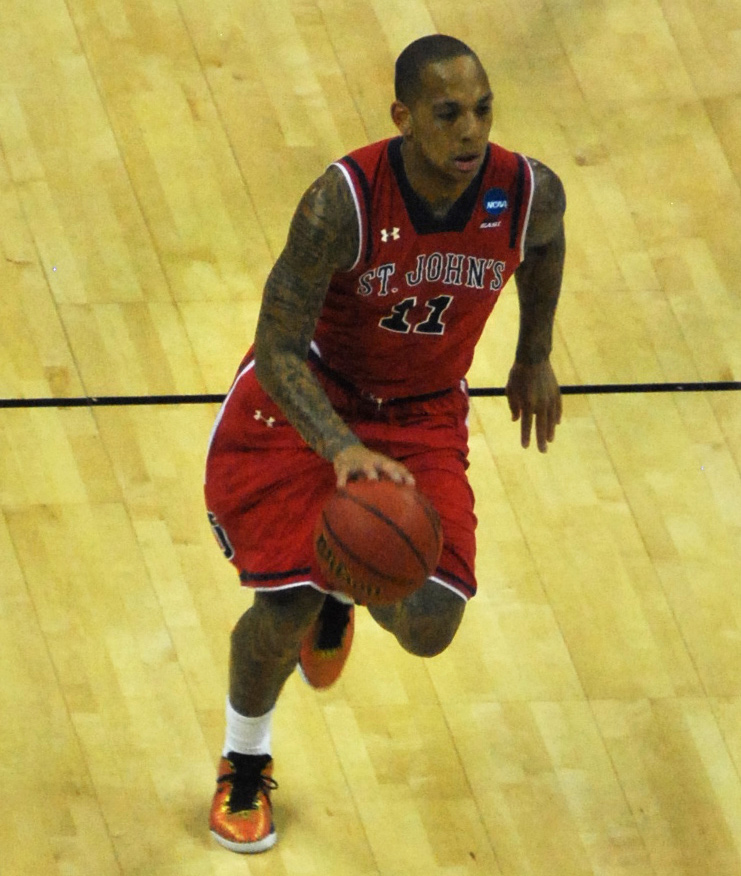
- Harrison with St. John's in 2015

Al-Ittihad Ahli of Aleppo
- Position: Shooting guard
- League: Syrian Basketball League

Personal information
- Born: August 14, 1993 (age 33) Anchorage, Alaska, U.S.
- Listed height: 6 ft 4 in (1.93 m)
- Listed weight: 203 kg (448 lb)

Career information
- High school: Dulles (Sugar Land, Texas)
- College: St. John's (2011–2015)
- NBA draft: 2015: undrafted
- Playing career: 2015–present

Career history
- 2015–2017: Muratbey Uşak Sportif
- 2017–2018: Hapoel Gilboa Galil
- 2018–2019: Enisey
- 2019–2020: ESSM Le Portel
- 2020: Maccabi Rishon LeZion
- 2020–2021: New Basket Brindisi
- 2021–2022: Prometey
- 2022–2023: New Basket Brindisi
- 2023–2025: Treviso Basket
- 2025–2026: Blu Basket 1971
- 2026: Shahrdari Gorgan
- 2026–: Al-Ittihad Ahli of Aleppo

Career highlights
- 2× First-team All-Big East (2014, 2015); Haggerty Award winner (2014); Second-team Parade All-American (2011)

D'Angelo Damon Harrison (born August 14, 1993) is an American-Syrian professional basketball player for Al-Ittihad Ahli of Aleppo of the Syrian Basketball League. He completed his college career for the St. John's Red Storm before playing professionally in Turkey, Israel and Russia. Harrison is known as a prolific scorer and marksman, holding the St. John's record for career three-pointers made.

== High school career ==
Harrison attended Dulles High School in Sugar Land, Texas, where he was coached by Mike Carrabine. As a junior, he posted averages of 20.8 points, 5.2 rebounds, 4.2 assists and 2.2 steals per game, earning Harrison 2009–10 Houston Chronicle Player of the Year and District MVP honors. As a senior, he averaged 31.1 points, 10.1 rebounds and 2.6 steals per game. He was named Fort Bend Player of the Year and was an all-state selection. According to Yahoo, Harrison was ranked 10th for his position and 40th nationally as a high school senior.

== College career ==
Harrison was a Big East All-Rookie selection in his freshman year. Harrison is known as a prolific scorer and marksman, holding the St. John's record for three-pointers made in a career.

Harrison scored a career-high 36 points, including six three-pointers, in an overtime loss to Villanova on January 2, 2013. He hit two free throws at the end of regulation to send the game to overtime. In his sophomore campaign, he averaged 17.8 points per game, good for third in the Big East. However, on March 1, he was suspended for the rest of the season by coach Steve Lavin. Lavin gave Harrison the option of transferring, turning pro, or reforming and remaining at St. John's; Harrison chose the third option. In the offseason, he attended a camp led by former NBA player John Lucas aiming to work on anger management issues. While there, he met and befriended former Rutgers coach Mike Rice Jr. The two drove to practices together and seeing how Rice, who allegedly made homophobic comments to players, worked on his own issues gave Harrison a new perspective on life.

As a junior, Harrison was named to the First Team All-Big East. He was selected to the District II (NY, NJ, DE, DC, PA, WV) All-District team by the United States Basketball Writers Association (USBWA). Harrison was listed on the National Association of Basketball Coaches Division I All‐District 5 first team on March 12. He received the Haggerty Award honoring the best college basketball player in New York City.

As a senior, he was one of the 10 finalists for that season's Senior CLASS Award. He was named to the All Big East First Team.

== Professional career ==
=== Uşak Sportif (2015–2017) ===
On June 30, 2015, Harrison signed with the Turkish team Uşak Sportif for the 2015–16 season. On October 26, 2015, Harrison signed a one-year contract extension with Uşak. In 25 games played during the 2016–17 season, he averaged 13 points, 3.8 rebounds and 4 assists per game.

=== Hapoel Gilboa Galil (2017–2018) ===
On July 10, 2017, Harrison signed with the Israeli team Hapoel Gilboa Galil for the 2017–18 season. On January 20, 2018, Harrison recorded a career-high 34 points, shooting 11-of-19 from the field, along with six rebounds, five steals and four assists in a 94–91 win over Maccabi Tel Aviv. Three days later, Harrison was named Israeli League Round 14 MVP. On April 28, 2018, Harrison tied his career-high 34 points, shooting 11-of-18 from the field, along with six rebounds and three assists in a 90–86 win over Hapoel Jerusalem. He was subsequently named Israeli League Round 27 MVP.

In 31 games played during the 2017–18 season, he averaged 16.2 points, 4.4 rebounds, 2.9 assists and 1.4 steals per game. Harrison helped Gilboa Galil reach the 2018 Israeli League Playoffs, where they eventually lost to Hapoel Jerusalem.

=== Enisey (2018–2019) ===
On July 24, 2018, Harrison signed a two-year deal with the Russian team Enisey of the VTB United League. On April 24, 2019, Harrison recorded a double-double and a season-high of 34 points and 12 rebounds, shooting 10-of-15 from the field, along with four assists in a 94–86 win over Khimki. In 25 VTB League games, he averaged 16.1 points, 6.4 rebounds, 3 assists and 1.2 steals per game.

=== ESSM Le Portel (2019–2020) ===
On July 8, 2019, Harrison signed with ESSM Le Portel of the French LNB Pro A for the 2019–20 season. On February 19, 2020, he leaves his club for personal reasons.

=== Maccabi Rishon LeZion (2020) ===
On February 25, 2020, he signed with Maccabi Rishon LeZion of the Israeli Premier League.

=== New Basket Brindisi (2020–2021) ===
On August 3, 2020, he signed a year deal with New Basket Brindisi of the Italian Lega Basket Serie A (LBA), and FIBA Basketball Champions League.

=== BC Prometey (2021–2022) ===
On July 17, 2021, Harrison signed with Prometey of the Ukrainian Basketball SuperLeague and FIBA Basketball Champions League (BCL). He averaged 15 points, 4.0 rebounds, 2.6 assists and 1.6 steals per game.

=== New Basket Brindisi (2022–2023) ===
On March 6, 2022, Harrison signed with New Basket Brindisi of the Lega Basket Serie A.

=== Universo Treviso Basket (2023–2025) ===
On August 9, 2023, he signed with Treviso Basket of the Lega Basket Serie A.

=== Blu Basket 1971 ===
On July 21, 2025, he signed with Blu Basket 1971 of the Serie A2 Basket.

=== Al-Ittihad SC Aleppo (2026–) ===
Harrison joined the Al-Ittihad Ahli of Aleppo of the Syrian Basketball League in September 2026.

== The Basketball Tournament (TBT) ==
In the summer of 2017, Harrison competed in The Basketball Tournament on ESPN for Gael Nation, a team composed of Iona College basketball alum. In two games, Harrison averaged 22.5 points, 5.5 rebounds and 4.0 assists per game; helping Gael Nation advance to the second round of the tournament where they lost to Boeheim's Army.

In TBT 2018, Harrison suited up for Team Fancy. In 2 games, he averaged 11 points, 4 assists, and 6.5 rebounds per game. Team Fancy reached the second round before falling to Boeheim's Army.

== Personal life ==
Harrison is the grandson of Angela and O.B. Harris. He was a communications major at St. John's. In November 2026, it was announced Harrison has acquired Syrian citizenship making him eligible to play for the Syria national team.
