= Derek Willis =

American basketball player (born 1995)

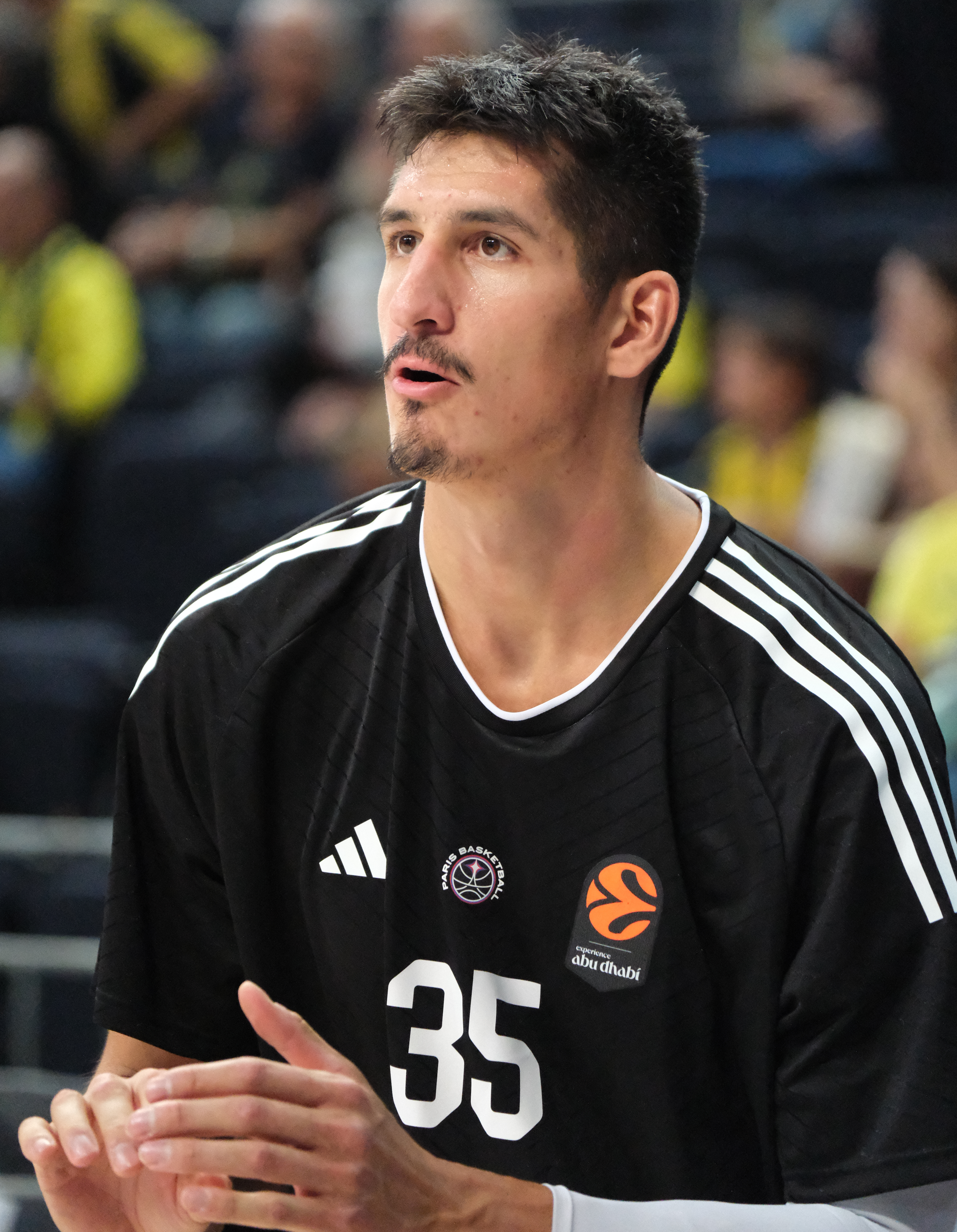
- Willis with Paris Basketball in 2025

No. 35 – Partizan
- Position: Power forward
- League: Serbian SuperLeague; ABA League; EuroLeague

Personal information
- Born: June 21, 1995 (age 31) Louisville, Kentucky, U.S.
- Listed height: 6 ft 9 in (2.06 m)
- Listed weight: 229 lb (104 kg)

Career information
- High school: Bullitt East (Mount Washington, Kentucky)
- College: Kentucky (2013–2017)
- NBA draft: 2017: undrafted
- Playing career: 2017–present

Career history
- 2017–2018: Grand Rapids Gold
- 2018–2019: Göttingen
- 2019–2020: Ratiopharm Ulm
- 2020–2021: Brindisi
- 2021–2022: Joventut Badalona
- 2022–2023: Reyer Venezia
- 2023–2025: Anadolu Efes
- 2025–2026: Paris Basketball
- 2026–present: Partizan

Career highlights
- Turkish Super Cup winner (2024)
- Stats at Basketball Reference

Derek Xavier Willis (born June 21, 1995) is a native American professional basketball player for Partizan Belgrade of the Serbian SuperLeague, the ABA League, and the EuroLeague. He played college basketball for the Kentucky Wildcats.

== Early life ==
Willis is one of a relatively small number of Native Americans who have played in NCAA Division I basketball. His mother is a member of three tribes—Southern Arapaho, Pawnee, and Muscogee. Although born in Louisville, Kentucky, he lived with his family for several years during his childhood on the Wind River Indian Reservation in Wyoming. According to Fox Sports writer Reid Forgrave, "His favorite childhood memories are from that reservation." The family eventually returned to the Louisville area, settling in the city of Mount Washington.

== High school career ==
As a 6-foot-9-inch (2.06 m), 200-pound (91 kg) senior at Bullitt East High School, Willis averaged 17.4 points and 9.4 rebounds per game.

== College career ==
Willis was the first player to commit to Kentucky's 2013–14 recruiting class, choosing UK over Indiana, Louisville and Purdue. He appeared in 103 games over his four-year career with the Wildcats, turning in averages of 5.4 points and 3.4 rebounds per contest, while making 108 of his 271 shots taken from three-point territory in his college career. Willis won the SEC tournament with the Wildcats in 2015, 2016 and 2017, advancing to the NCAA Final Four in 2015. He proposed to his girlfriend on senior night, prior to Kentucky's home game against Vanderbilt.

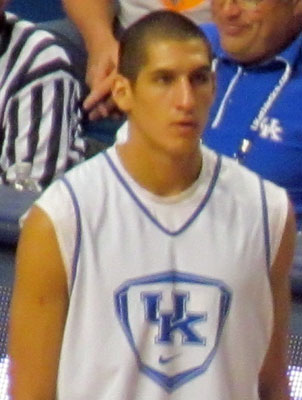
Willis with Kentucky Wildcats in 2014

In April 2017, he attended the Portsmouth Invitational Tournament in Portsmouth, Virginia.

== Professional career ==
=== Grand Rapids Drive (2017–2018) ===
After going undrafted, Willis was signed by the Detroit Pistons of the NBA as a part of their training camp roster, before being reassigned to the Pistons' G League affiliate Grand Rapids Drive. In his professional debut on November 3, 2017, he provided the game-winning tip-in in Grand Rapids' 86–85 victory over the Erie BayHawks. Making 43 G League appearances (38 starts) as a first-year player, Willis averaged 11.8 points and 6.9 rebounds per contest.

=== BG Göttingen (2018–2019) ===
In late July 2018, Willis inked a deal with BG Göttingen of the German Basketball Bundesliga. He saw action in 34 Bundesliga games, averaging 12.0 points and 5.0 rebounds per contest for the Violets.

=== Ratiopharm Ulm (2019–2020) ===
On July 22, 2019, he signed a two-year deal with German Bundesliga outfit Ratiopharm Ulm, known as the Sparrows. Willis averaged 7.9 points and 4.8 rebounds per game during the 2019–20 season.

=== New Basket Brindisi (2020–2021) ===
On July 17, 2020, he signed with New Basket Brindisi of the Lega Basket Serie A (LBA).

=== Joventut Badalona (2021–2022) ===
On July 14, 2021, Willis signed with Joventut Badalona of the Liga ACB.

=== Reyer Venezia (2022–2023) ===
On July 13, 2022, Willis signed with Reyer Venezia of the Lega Basket Serie A. He averaged 12.9 points and 5 rebounds in the EuroCup, along with 9.9 points and 5.5 rebounds in the domestic league.

=== Anadolu Efes (2023–2025) ===
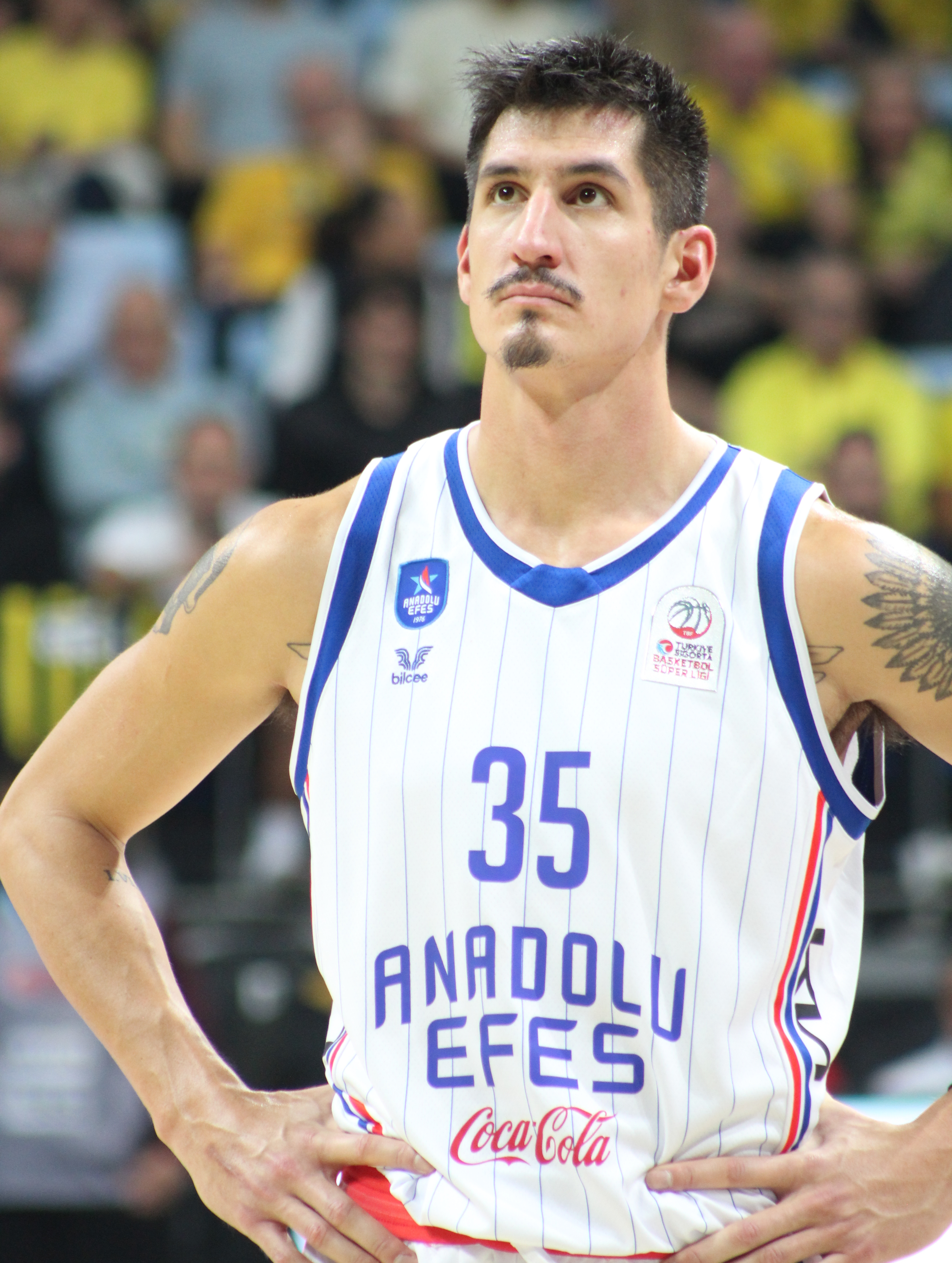
Derek Willis with Anadolu Efes in 2024

On June 25, 2023, Willis signed a two-year (1+1) contract with Turkish powerhouse Anadolu Efes.

=== Paris Basketball (2025–2026) ===
On July 4, 2025, he signed with Paris Basketball of the LNB Élite.

=== Partizan (2026–present) ===
On July 28, 2026, Willis signed a two-year del with Partizan of the Serbian SuperLeague, the ABA League, and the EuroLeague.

== International career ==
Willis was a member of the US team that competed at the 2012 Albert Schweitzer Tournament. In February 2018, he was named to the USA squad for the 2019 World Cup qualifiers.

== Career statistics ==
Legend
GP	Games played	GS	Games started	MPG	Minutes per game
FG%	Field-goal percentage	3P%	3-point field-goal percentage	FT%	Free-throw percentage
RPG	Rebounds per game	APG	Assists per game	SPG	Steals per game
BPG	Blocks per game	PPG	Points per game	PIR	Performance index rating
**Bold**	Career high

=== EuroLeague ===
Year	Team	GP	GS	MPG	FG%	3P%	FT%	RPG	APG	SPG	BPG	PPG	PIR
2023–24	Anadolu Efes	26	12	23.0	.475	.444	.944	3.7	.8	.6	.3	7.3	9.0
Career		26	12	23.0	.475	.444	.944	3.7	.8	.6	.3	7.3	9.0

=== EuroCup ===
Year	Team	GP	GS	MPG	FG%	3P%	FT%	RPG	APG	SPG	BPG	PPG	PIR
2019–20	ratiopharm Ulm	9	7	22.1	.531	**.571**	**.909**	5.4	1.3	.4	**.6**	10.4	13.1
2021–22	Badalona	17	13	23.1	.532	.417	.667	**5.6**	**1.5**	**.9**	.4	9.0	12.9
2022–23	Reyer Venezia	**19**	**18**	**25.2**	**.546**	.475	.907	5.0	1.1	.6	.1	**12.9**	**15.0**
Career		45	38	23.8	.538	.480	.821	5.3	1.3	.7	.3	11.0	13.8

=== Basketball Champions League ===
Year	Team	GP	GS	MPG	FG%	3P%	FT%	RPG	APG	SPG	BPG	PPG
2020–21	Brindisi	10	10	24.1	.567	.476	.862	5.3	1.6	.8	—	10.3
Career		10	10	24.1	.567	.476	.862	5.3	1.6	.8	—	10.3

=== Domestic leagues ===
Year	Team	League	GP	MPG	FG%	3P%	FT%	RPG	APG	SPG	BPG	PPG
2017–18	(United States) Grand Rapids Gold	G League	43	28.1	.469	.376	.816	6.8	.8	1.1	.7	11.8
2018–19	(Germany) Göttingen	BBL	34	23.8	.486	.425	.806	5.0	.6	.8	.7	12.0
2019–20	(Germany) ratiopharm Ulm	BBL	28	19.0	.453	.375	.809	5.2	1.1	.5	.6	8.6
2020–21	(Italy) Brindisi	LBA	31	28.3	.490	.347	.811	8.3	1.6	.9	.6	11.0
2021–22	(Spain) Joventut Badalona	ACB	40	23.2	.523	.439	.879	4.7	1.0	.7	.5	9.6
2022–23	(Italy) Reyer Venezia	LBA	34	24.5	.514	.455	.871	5.2	1.4	.5	.3	9.8
2023–24	(Turkey) Anadolu Efes	TBSL	25	25.4	.578	.432	.946	4.7	1.2	1.0	.5	10.4

=== College ===
Year	Team	GP	GS	MPG	FG%	3P%	FT%	RPG	APG	SPG	BPG	PPG
2013–14	Kentucky	14	0	2.8	.333	.167	.750	.6	—	.1	—	1.1
2014–15	Kentucky	19	0	3.9	.389	.333	**1.000**	.7	.3	.1	.2	1.3
2015–16	Kentucky	32	11	18.6	**.482**	**.442**	.889	4.0	.4	**.7**	.8	**7.7**
2016–17	Kentucky	**38**	**15**	**21.9**	.478	.377	.688	**5.4**	**.9**	**.7**	**1.0**	7.0
Career		103	26	15.0	.473	.399	.802	3.4	.5	.5	.6	5.4
