= Daniele Cavaliero =

Italian basketball player (born 1984)

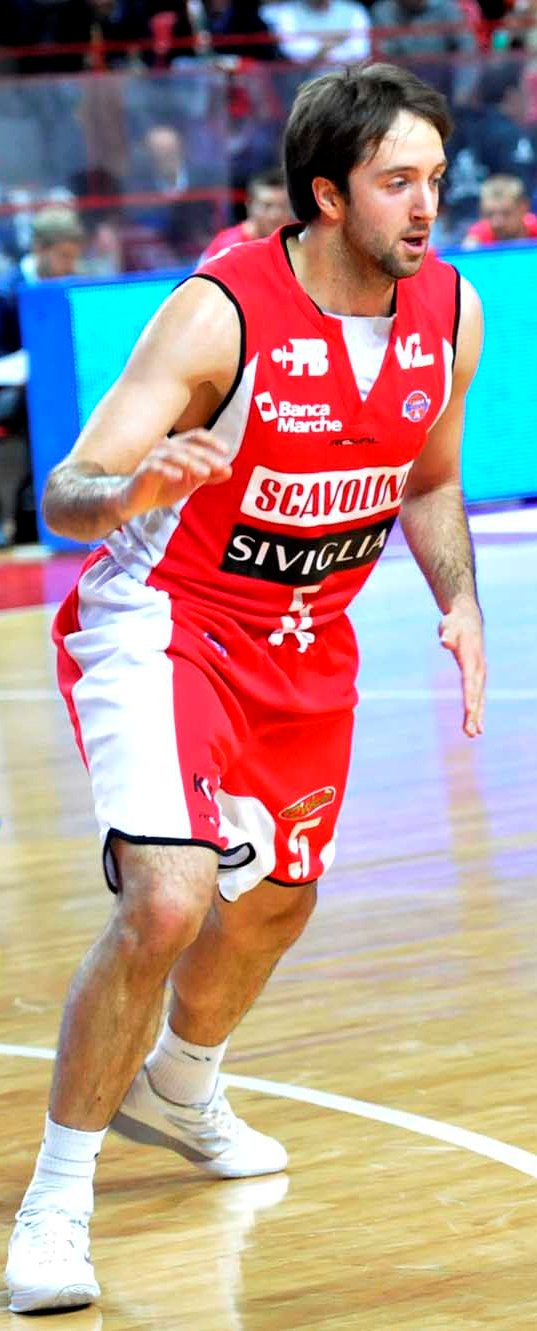

No. 18 – Pallacanestro Trieste
- Position: Point guard
- League: LBA

Personal information
- Born: 10 January 1984 (age 42) Oggiono, Lecco, Italy
- Listed height: 1.83 m (6 ft 0 in)
- Listed weight: 83 kg (183 lb)

Career information
- Playing career: 1999–present

Career history
- 1999–2004: Pallacanestro Trieste
- 2004–2006: Olimpia Milano
- 2006: Roseto Sharks
- 2006–2007: Fortitudo Bologna
- 2007–2008: Scandone Avellino
- 2008–2011: Sutor Montegranaro
- 2011–2013: Victoria Libertas Pesaro
- 2013–2015: Scandone Avellino
- 2015–2017: Pallacanestro Varese
- 2017–present: Pallacanestro Trieste

Career highlights
- Italian Cup winner (2008)

Daniele Cavaliero (born 10 January 1984) is an Italian professional basketball player who plays for Pallacanestro Trieste of the Italian Lega Basket Serie A (LBA). He is a 6 ft 2 in (1.88 m) point guard.

== Professional career ==
Daniele Cavaliero grew up with Pallacanestro Trieste youth teams. He made his debut with Pallacanestro Trieste during the 1999–00 season. The two years after he played in Olimpia club in Milan.

From the beginning of the 2005–06 Lega Basket Serie A season, he played with Roseto Sharks, but later Daniele moved to Fortitudo Bologna due to the bruckupty of the club based in Roseto. In November 2007 he was engaged by Scandone Avellino, known as Air Avellino for sponsorship reasons. During that period he won with Avellino the 2018 Italian basketball Cup and achieved the qualification for the EuroLeague.

In the 2008-09 season he was in Montegranaro where he played 30 matches with 5 points and 1.3 assists per game. For the following season he got 8.7 points and 2.2 assists per game. He played the quarterfinals of the 2010 Lega Basket Serie A Playoffs against Olimpia Milano.

In summer 2010, he was convoked by Simone Pianigiani in the Italy national basketball team

In March 2012 he took part of the Lega Basket All Star Game at Mediolanum Forum in Milan.

From July 2011 he became a new player of Scavolini Pesaro with a two years contract. In September 2013 Daniele returned to Avellino, where he played for two more seasons.

On 20 July 2015 Cavaliero went to Pallacanestro Varese with a two years contract. On 25 April 2017 Cavaliero signed with Alma Trieste. He signed a one-year contract extension on 27 June 2020.

== Honours and titles ==
=== Team ===
- Italian Cup winner (1): 2008
