= Marcos Delía =

Argentine basketball player (born 1992)

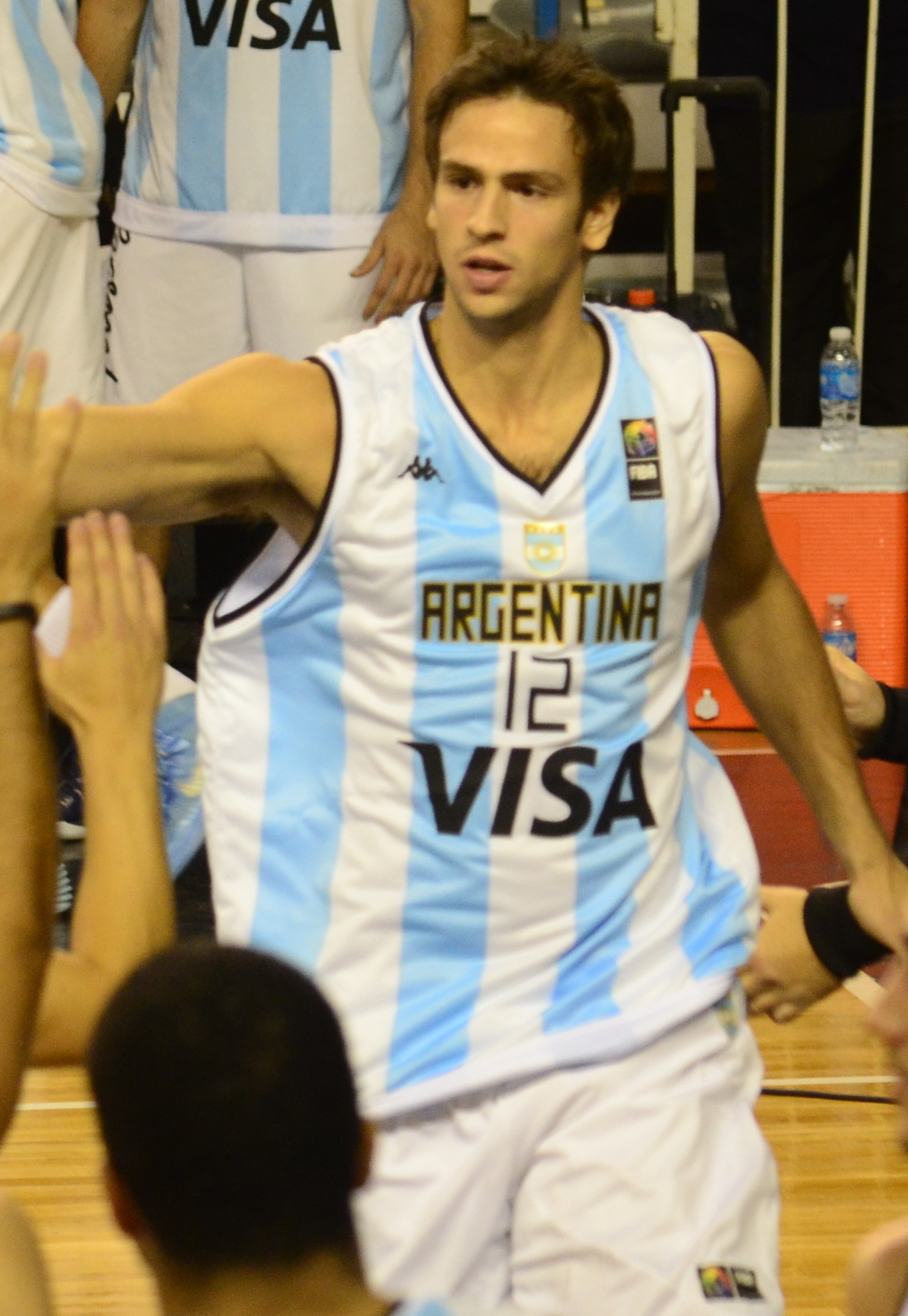
- Delía with Argentina, in 2015.

No. 12 – Boca Juniors
- Position: Center

Personal information
- Born: April 8, 1992 (age 34) Saladillo, Argentina
- Listed height: 2.09 m (6 ft 10 in)
- Listed weight: 111 kg (245 lb)

Career information
- NBA draft: 2014: undrafted
- Playing career: 2010–present

Career history
- 2010–2014: Boca Juniors
- 2014–2016: Obras Sanitarias
- 2016–2019: Murcia
- 2019: Joventut
- 2019: Fuerza Regia de Monterrey
- 2019–2020: Virtus Bologna
- 2020–2022: Trieste
- 2022–2023: BC Wolves
- 2023-2024: APU Udine
- 2024-present: Boca Juniors
Medals
Event	1st	2nd	3rd
FIBA World Cup	0	1	0
FIBA AmeriCup	1	2	1
Pan American Games	1	0	0
FIBA South American Championship	1	1	0
Total	3	4	1
Men's basketball
Representing Argentina
World Cup
Silver medal – second place	2019 China	
FIBA AmeriCup
Gold medal – first place	2022 Brazil	
Silver medal – second place	2015 Mexico	
Silver medal – second place	2017 Argentina	
Bronze medal – third place	2013 Venezuela	
Pan American Games
Gold medal – first place	2019 Lima	
FIBA South American Championship
Gold medal – first place	2012 Argentina	
Silver medal – second place	2014 Venezuela	

Marcos Nicolás Delía (born April 8, 1992) is an Argentine-Italian professional basketball player. He also represents the senior Argentina national basketball team internationally. He is a 2.09 m (6 ft 10 in) tall center, that can also play as a power forward, if needed.

== Professional career ==
Delía played with Lanus Buenos Aires in Argentina during the 2008–09 season. He spent the 2009–10 season with Ciudad de Saladillo. He then moved to the Argentine club Boca Juniors in 2010, and he stayed there until 2014 when he moved to the Argentine club Obras Sanitarias.

In 2016, he moved to the Spanish League club UCAM Murcia. In the 2016–17 season, he debuted in EuroCup and averaged 3.6 points and 2.6 rebounds in 14 appearances. In the Spanish League, he made 32 appearances and averaged 5.7 points and 3.3 rebounds per game. In the 2017–18 season, he averaged 6.2 points and 3.9 rebounds over 34 Spanish League games. He started the 2018–19 season playing for UCAM Murcia and, in the mid-season, moved to Joventut. In 32 games of the Spanish League, he averaged 5.8 points and 3.1 rebounds per game for both clubs.

In the summer of 2019, Delia signed a contract with the reigning Mexican champions Fuerza Regia de Monterrey; however, after only a few months, in October he joined Virtus Bologna in the Lega Basket Serie A.

On October 12, 2020, he signed with Pallacanestro Trieste in the Italian Serie A.

On August 4, 2022, Delia signed a one-year deal with BC Wolves of the Lithuanian Basketball League.

== National team career ==
Delía was a member of the junior national teams of Argentina. With Argentina's junior national teams, he won the gold medal at the 2009 FIBA South America Under-17 Championship, where he won a gold medal, at the 2010 FIBA Americas Under-18 Championship, and at the 2011 FIBA Under-19 World Championship.

He has also been a member of the senior men's Argentine national basketball team. With the senior Argentine national team, he has won medals at the following tournaments: the 2012 South American Championship, where he won a gold medal; the 2014 South American Championship, where he won a silver medal, the 2013 FIBA Americas Championship, where he won a bronze medal, and the 2015 FIBA Americas Championship, where he won a silver medal.

He has also played with Argentina's senior national team at the following tournaments: the 2011 Pan American Games and the 2015 Pan American Games, the 2014 FIBA Basketball World Cup, 2016 South American Championship, and the 2016 Summer Olympics.

In 2019, he participated in the team that won the Pan American gold medal in Lima. He was included in the Argentine squad for the 2019 FIBA Basketball World Cup and clinched the silver medal with Argentina, which emerged as runners-up to Spain at the 2019 FIBA Basketball World Cup.

In 2022, Delía won the gold medal in the 2022 FIBA AmeriCup held in Recife, Brazil. He was Argentina's starting center in the tournament.
