= Milton Doyle =

American basketball player (born 1993)

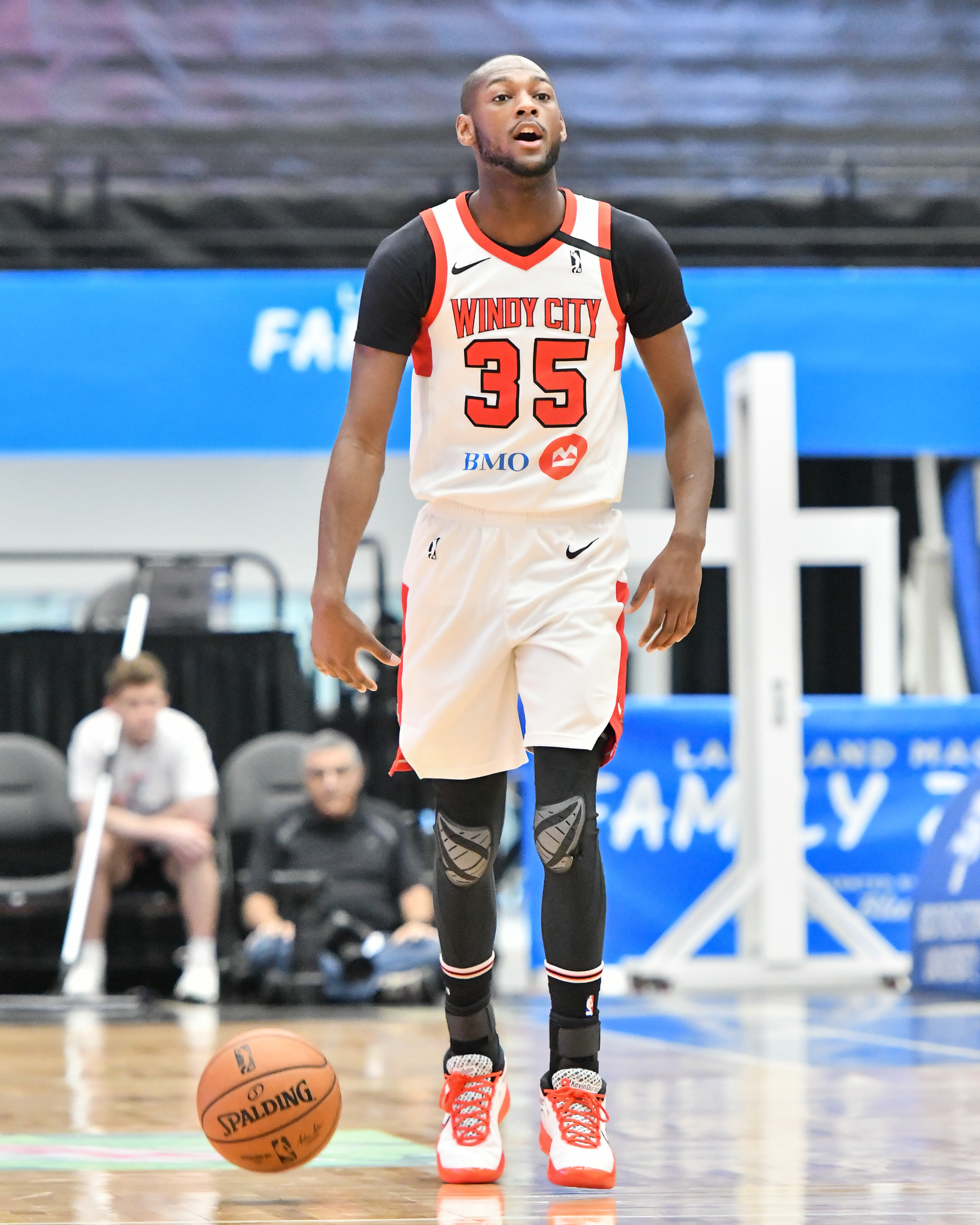
- Doyle with the Windy City Bulls in 2020

No. 35 – Illawarra Hawks
- Position: Shooting guard
- League: NBL

Personal information
- Born: October 31, 1993 (age 33) Chicago, Illinois, U.S.
- Listed height: 6 ft 4 in (193 cm)
- Listed weight: 190 lb (86 kg)

Career information
- High school: Marshall (Chicago, Illinois)
- College: Loyola Chicago (2013–2017)
- NBA draft: 2017: undrafted
- Playing career: 2017–present

Career history
- 2017–2018: Brooklyn Nets
- 2017–2018: →Long Island Nets
- 2018–2019: Murcia
- 2019–2020: Windy City Bulls
- 2020–2021: Pallacanestro Trieste
- 2021–2022: Gaziantep Basketbol
- 2022–2025: Tasmania JackJumpers
- 2023: Tofaş
- 2024–2025: Indios de Mayagüez
- 2025–2026: Melbourne United
- 2026: Napoli
- 2026–present: Illawarra Hawks

Career highlights
- NBL champion (2024); All-NBL First Team (2023); All-NBL Second Team (2024); First-team All-MVC (2017)
- Stats at NBA.com
- Stats at Basketball Reference

Milton Edward Doyle (born October 31, 1993) is an American professional basketball player for the Illawarra Hawks of the Australian National Basketball League (NBL). He played college basketball for the Loyola Ramblers.

== High school career ==
Doyle attended Marshall High School in Chicago, Illinois. As a senior, he averaged 19 points, seven rebounds, five assists and five steals per game.

Doyle wasn't a highly rated recruit, in part because a wrist injury kept of him off of the AAU circuit in the summer of 2011.

== College career ==
Doyle signed a financial aid agreement with the Kansas Jayhawks. He was a late addition to KU's recruiting class after originally committing to Florida International. After enrolling at KU in June 2012, he participated in offseason workouts with the Jayhawks, including the team's trip to France and Switzerland in August 2012. Upon returning to the U.S., Doyle left the program after KU granted his scholarship release.

Doyle transferred to the Loyola Ramblers, but had to sit out the 2012–13 season due to NCAA transfer regulations. He debuted for the Ramblers in the 2013–14 season.

In the 2016–17 season, Doyle became the first player in Ramblers' history to be named to the All-MVC First Team and earned NABC First Team All-District 16 honours. He was also named MVC player of the week twice during the 2016–17 season.

== Professional career ==
=== Long Island Nets (2017) ===
Doyle went undrafted for the 2017 NBA draft. On June 23, 2017, Doyle was invited to join the Brooklyn Nets' 2017 NBA Summer League team. He scored 13 points, 4 rebounds and 1 assist in 16 minutes of play in his debut.

On August 4, 2017, Doyle signed with the Nets. On October 11, he was waived by the Nets. He would later be assigned to the Long Island Nets NBA G League affiliate squad after being waived, playing for them in 17 games around that time.

=== Brooklyn Nets (2017–2018) ===
On December 18, the Brooklyn Nets signed Doyle to a two-way contract after waiving their previous candidate Yakuba Ouattara. From this point throughout the rest of the season onward, Doyle would split playing time between the parent squad in Brooklyn and the affiliate squad in Long Island, with a majority of his time spent on Long Island. Doyle would make his NBA debut on December 26, 2017, scoring 2 points in a single minute of action under a 109–97 loss against the San Antonio Spurs.

=== Murcia (2018–2019) ===
On August 8, 2018, Doyle signed a one-year deal with UCAM Murcia of the Liga ACB.

=== Windy City Bulls (2019–2020) ===
On September 30, 2019, Doyle signed a partially guaranteed deal with the Chicago Bulls. He was assigned to their G League affiliate, the Windy City Bulls. During the shortened 2019–20 season, Doyle averaged 17.5 points, 5.8 assists, 4.1 rebounds, and 2 steals per game, shooting 40% from the field and 36% from three point range.

=== Pallacanestro Trieste (2020–2021) ===
In July 2020, Doyle signed with Italian team Pallacanestro Trieste.

=== Gaziantep Basketbol (2021–2022) ===
On August 12, 2021, Doyle signed with Gaziantep Basketbol of the Basketbol Süper Ligi (BSL).

=== Tasmania JackJumpers, Tofaş and Indios de Mayagüez (2022–2025) ===
On June 24, 2022, Doyle signed with the Tasmania JackJumpers in Australia for the 2022–23 NBL season. He was named to the All-NBL First Team and earned Club MVP honors, averaging 17 points, 5 rebounds, and 3.7 assists per game.

On February 21, 2023, Doyle signed with Tofaş of Basketbol Süper Ligi (BSL).

On June 8, 2023, Doyle re-signed with the JackJumpers on a two-year deal. In the 2023–24 NBL season, the JackJumpers reached the NBL Grand Final series, where they won the NBL championship with a 3–2 grand final series victory over Melbourne United.

On April 8, 2024, Doyle signed with Indios de Mayagüez of the Baloncesto Superior Nacional for the 2024 season.

On November 15, 2024, Doyle scored 32 points with eight 3-pointers in the JackJumpers' 95–92 win over the Brisbane Bullets.

Doyle re-joined Indios de Mayagüez for the 2025 BSN season.

=== Melbourne United and Napoli (2025–2026) ===
On June 13, 2025, Doyle signed with Melbourne United for the 2025–26 NBL season. He averaged 16.2 points, 3.6 rebounds and 4.3 assists per game.

On March 13, 2026, Doyle signed with Napoli of the Lega Basket Serie A.

=== Illawarra Hawks (2026–present) ===
On July 30, 2026, Doyle signed with the Illawarra Hawks for the 2026–27 NBL season.

== NBA career statistics ==
Legend
GP	Games played	GS	Games started	MPG	Minutes per game
FG%	Field goal percentage	3P%	3-point field goal percentage	FT%	Free throw percentage
RPG	Rebounds per game	APG	Assists per game	SPG	Steals per game
BPG	Blocks per game	PPG	Points per game	**Bold**	Career high

=== Regular season ===
Year	Team	GP	GS	MPG	FG%	3P%	FT%	RPG	APG	SPG	BPG	PPG
2017–18	Brooklyn	10	0	12.5	.277	.174	.500	1.8	1.0	.6	.2	3.4
Career		10	0	12.5	.277	.174	.500	1.8	1.0	.6	.2	3.4

== Personal life ==
Doyle has a wife and two children. His father died in December 2023.
