= PalaPentassuglia =

Indoor arena in Brindisi, Italy

Coordinates: 40.6138°N 17.9469°E

- PalaElio
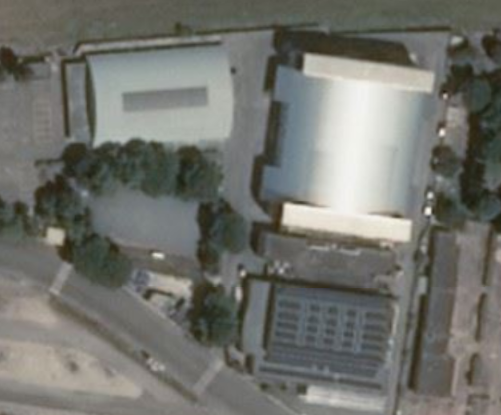
- Interactive map of PalaPentassuglia
- Full name: Palazzetto dello Sport "Elio Pentassuglia"
- Location: Brindisi, Italy
- Capacity: Basketball: 3,534
- Surface: Parquet

Construction
- Opened: 1981
- Renovated: 2007, 2008, 2010, 2015

Tenant
- New Basket Brindisi

PalaPentassuglia, or PalaElio, is an indoor arena that is located in Brindisi, Italy. The arena's full name is Palazzetto dello Sport "Elio Pentassuglia". The arena is named in honor or of the Italian basketball player and basketball coach Elio Pentassuglia. The arena has mainly been used to host volleyball, basketball, boxing, fencing, and gymnastics. The current capacity of the arena for basketball games is 3,534.

== History ==
The arena opened in 1981, originally having a capacity of 2,390. In 2007, the first renovation of the arena was done, with the structure's roof being reconstructed. In 2008, the arena's first expansion was done, with the capacity being increased to 2,502. That renovation also included new baskets, a revamped area around the court, remodeled and expanded locker rooms, a new gym, a new infirmary room, and a new press room.

Its capacity was then increased to 3,534 in 2010, in order to meet the 3,500 seat minimum requirement of the Italian League for the home games of New Basket Brindisi. In 2015, the arena was updated again, in order to meet the minimum arena rules and standards of the Eurocup. Future plans have been approved to again renovate and expand the arena's seating capacity to about 6,000, so that it would meet minimum standards for Euroleague games.
