= Justin Robinson (basketball, born 1995) =

American basketball player (born 1995)

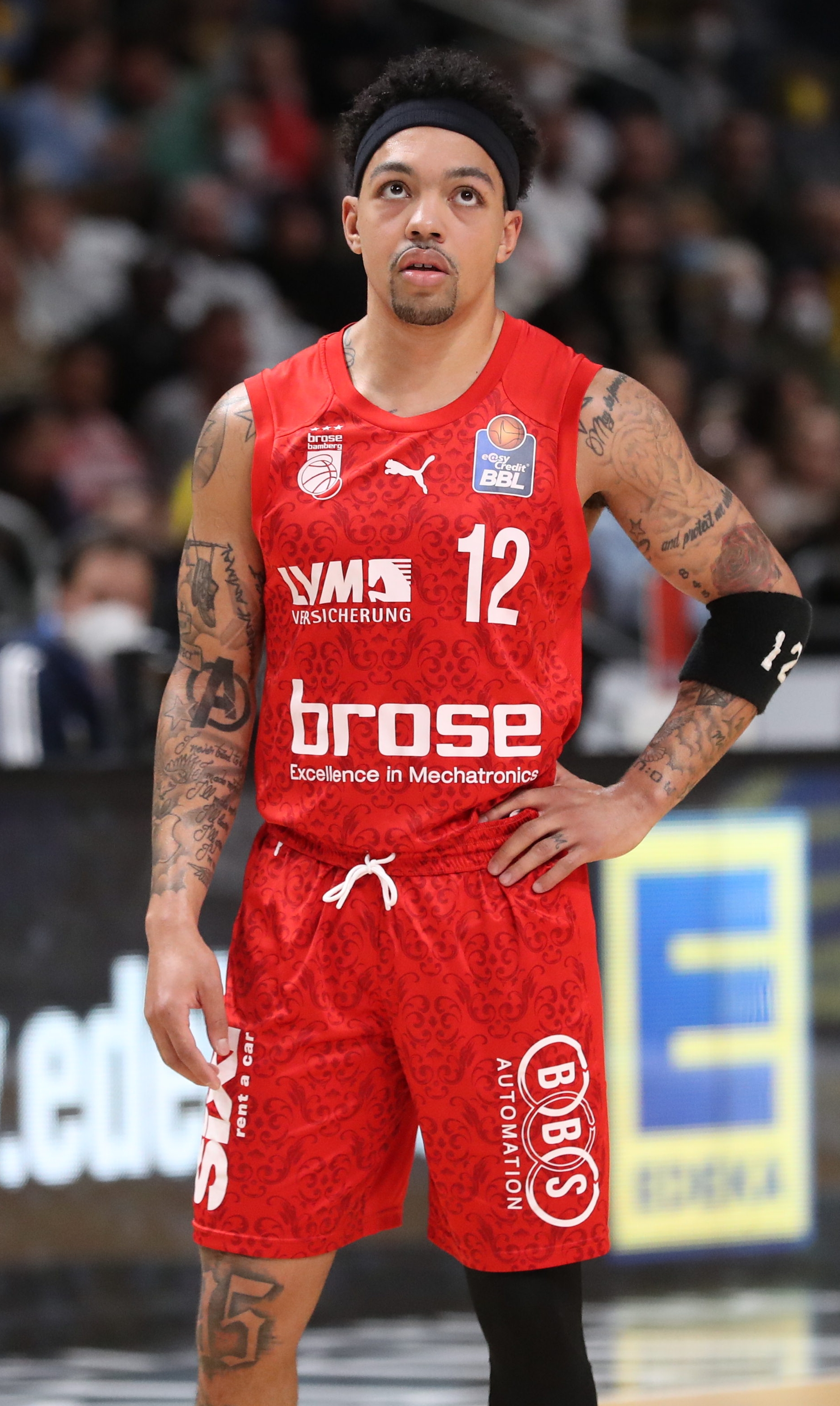

No. 12 – Juvi Cremona
- Position: Point guard
- League: Serie A2

Personal information
- Born: April 12, 1995 (age 31) Kingston, New York, U.S.
- Listed height: 5 ft 8 in (1.73 m)
- Listed weight: 175 lb (79 kg)

Career information
- High school: Kingston (Kingston, New York)
- College: Monmouth (2013–2017)
- NBA draft: 2017: undrafted
- Playing career: 2017–present

Career history
- 2017–2018: Avtodor Saratov
- 2018–2020: Élan Chalon
- 2020–2021: Victoria Libertas Pesaro
- 2021–2022: Brose Bamberg
- 2022–2023: BCM Gravelines-Dunkerque
- 2023: Yukatel Merkezefendi
- 2023–2024: Treviso Basket
- 2024–2025: Rasta Vechta
- 2025: Śląsk Wrocław
- 2025–2026: Pallacanestro Roseto
- 2026: Široki
- 2026–present: Juvi Cremona

Career highlights
- 2× LNB All-Star (2019, 2020); LNB Skills Challenge Winner 2019; LNB Assist Leader 2019; VTB United League Player of the Month; Lou Henson Award (2017); 2× AP Honorable Mention All-American (2016, 2017); 2× MAAC Player of the Year (2016, 2017); 3× First-team All-MAAC (2015–2017); MAAC All-Decade Team

Justin DeVaughn “Scoop” Robinson (born April 12, 1995) is an American professional basketball player for Juvi Cremona of the Italian Serie A2. He played college basketball for the Monmouth Hawks.

== College career ==
Robinson did not receive many scholarship offers out of high school due to his small stature. He scored 22 points in a 70-68 win over Notre Dame on November 26, 2015, the program's first victory over a ranked opponent. At the Advocare Invitational Tournament he set the tournament scoring record with 75 points over 3 games, which the record was previously held by former NBA first round draft pick Michael Beasley. As a junior, Robinson averaged 20.2 points, 3.7 assists, and 2.1 steals per game. He led Monmouth to its first ever MAAC regular season title and a school record 25 victories. As a result, he was named first-team All-MAAC for the second straight year as well as MAAC Player of the Year. On three occasions Robinson was named MAAC Player of the week. Robinson also played football for Kingston High school where he played defensive back.

Robinson was again named MAAC Player of the Year in his senior season after averaging 19.7 points per game and leading Monmouth to the regular-season MAAC championship. He is one of three players in conference history to ever be named Player of the Year twice in their collegiate career. He scored his 2,000th career point in his final college game, a first round National Invitation Tournament loss to Ole Miss. Robinson graduated Monmouth as the all-time leading scorer in school history, second all-time in assist, and second all-time in career steals. For his stellar production, Robinson was named to the MAAC conference’s All-Decade Team.

== Professional career ==
In the summer of 2017, Robinson signed with the Miami Heat for the NBA Summer League. He ultimately signed with the Russian club Avtodor Saratov on August 2, 2017. On July 5, 2018, Robinson signed with the French team Élan Chalon. Robinson led the league in assists per game at 8.2 and averaged 15.2 points per game. He re-signed with the team for the 2019-20 season.

On August 2, 2020, he has signed with Victoria Libertas Pesaro of the Italian Lega Basket Serie A (LBA).

On July 6, 2021, he has signed with Brose Bamberg of the Basketball Bundesliga (BBL) On January 5, 2022, Robinson played against former Monmouth University teammate, Maximilian Dileo for the Hamberg Towers. Robinson scored 7 points and Dileo scored 4 points. On their second meeting, Robinson scored 23 points with 7 assists to help send Bamberg into the playoffs.

On August 3, 2022, he has signed with BCM Gravelines-Dunkerque of the LNB Pro A.

On August 5, 2023, he signed with Yukatel Merkezefendi of the Basketbol Süper Ligi (BSL).

On November 21, 2023, he signed with Treviso Basket of the Lega Basket Serie A.

On August 9, 2024, he signed with Rasta Vechta of the Basketball Bundesliga (BBL).

On January 20, 2025, he signed with Śląsk Wrocław of the Polish Basketball League (PLK).
