= New Basket Brindisi =

Basketball team

Valtur Brindisi
- Nickname: Stella del sud (Star of the South)
- Leagues: Serie A2
- Founded: 1992; 34 years ago
- History: New Basket Ceglie (1992–2004); New Basket Brindisi (2004–present)
- Arena: PalaPentassuglia
- Capacity: 3,534
- Location: Brindisi, Apulia, Italy
- President: Fernando Marino
- Head coach: Nicola Brienza
- Ownership: New Basket Brindisi S.p.A.
- Championships: 1 LegaDue; 1 LegaDue Cup
- Website: newbasketbrindisi.it
LBA Home	LBA Away	Italian Cup
BCL Home	BCL Away

New Basket Brindisi, for sponsorship reasons named Valtur Brindisi or shortly Brindisi, is an Italian professional basketball team based in Brindisi, Apulia. They compete in the Serie A2, the second level on the Italian basketball pyramid. Founded in 2004, the club has gradually grown to reach the top tier Lega Basket Serie A (LBA), the title playoffs, the EuroChallenge and lastly the BCL.

== History ==
Brindisi had in the past been represented by Libertas Brindisi, which played during the '70 and the season 1981–82 in the first division and spent nine others in the second division around the same period (including a few with local great Elio Pentassuglia as coach). That side would fold in 1987 whilst another local side, Azzurra Brindisi, played a few seasons in the third division during the 1990s before itself disappearing in 2001. The city was left without a representative in the national divisions, in the meantime, New Basket Ceglie – based in nearby Ceglie Messapica since its 1992 foundation – had been promoted to the fourth division Serie B but was hampered by the lack of a suitable arena in the town (the local Palazzetto dello sport only seating 500). Ceglie then moved to Brindisi's PalaPentassuglia arena that same summer, however the team didn't draw the local public and was sold to Giovanni Di Bella at the end of the season, with the new owner making the move to the city permanent. Also in 2002, Massimo Ferrarese started sponsoring the club under his company's Prefabbricati Pugliesi brand, two years he would buy out Di Bella (who was planning on selling the club to a team in another city) to become the sole owner of the club and form New Basket Brindisi in the process, with Antonio Codiano as its president.

On the court, Brindisi won the Serie B2 regular season and reached the promotion playoffs final as favourites, however they lost the series against Ribera after being beaten 71–104 in the decisive game on 25 May 2005. They were admitted to the Serie B1 in all cases, finishing the 2005–06 season fifth. The next season saw a team led by Uruguayan Alejandro Muro win the regular season but lose in the playoff quarterfinals to Veroli. The promotion goal would finally be attained on 8 June 2008 as Brindisi beat Trapani to reach the championship final (that they would lose to Venezia) and earn a promotion to the LegaDue.

After a transitional season, Brindisi, coached by promotion specialist Giovanni Perdichizzi, won the 2009–10 LegaDue regular season to move up to the first division Serie A. The team did not manage to stay in the elite as they were relegated at the end of a season that saw a lot of roster changes, including Perdichizzi's replacement by Luca Bechi. The offseason saw organisational changes as Ferrarese ceded most of his shares to a newly formed group of twelve local businessmen, staying as honorary president (a post he left in 2014 following disagreements with new owner Fernando Marino). Bucchi then led the team to a successful season as they lost only one game during the promotion playoffs, beating Pistoia in the decisive finals game 4 on 14 June 2012 to return to the Serie A. The team had earlier won the LegaDue Cup by beating Fileni BPA Jesi 77-74 in the final.

Its second season in the elite proved better than the first as Brindisi, led by Jonathan Gibson and Jeff Viggiano, qualified for the mid-season Italian Cup final eight and seemed a sure bet for the playoffs before losing ten of its last eleven regular season games to finish twelfth, a position that comfortably guaranteed its Serie A place. The 2013–14 season proved even better, the club finished the first stage of the season in first place (tied on 22 points with Cantù but above on head-to-head record) to again qualify for the Italian Cup. Brindisi reached the Italian Cup semifinals before losing to EA7 Emporio Armani Milan, while its fifth-place finish in the league (conceding the fourth place to Dinamo Banco di Sardegna Sassari when defeated by the side in the final regular season game) qualified it for the playoffs. Though they were swept 3-0 by Sassari it was still a record-breaking season to celebrate for the fans. The 2014–15 season saw the Italian side make its European debut in the third tier EuroChallenge, going all the way to the quarterfinals before getting knocked out by Nanterre. A sixth-place finish in the league saw the Apulians again take part in the playoffs, in which they earned their first ever victory during the quarterfinal series against Grissin Bon Reggion Emilia, leading the tie 2–1 before wasting two chances to go through.

Brindisi received a wild card to be admitted to the European second-tier 2015–16 Eurocup.

== Arena ==
The Palazzetto Nuova Idea (capacity: 2,302) was built in September 1980 and completed only hours before then tenant Pallacanestro Brindisi's (a renamed Libertas) first game of the season. New Basket Ceglie moved into the arena in 2001, starting New Basket Brindisi's tenure (starting from them taking over Ceglie in 2004). Nuova Idea, named after the private company that built and owned it, was renamed PalaPentassuglia (in full:Palazzetto dello Sport "Elio Pentassuglia") in honour of Brindisi stalwart Elio Pentassuglia (deceased in a 1988 car crash) after it came under possession of the municipality sometime later, it is sometimes colloquially referred to as PalaElio.

The venue was not up to the standards of the Serie A when Brindisi entered the league in 2010, as the long projected construction of a new arena had not borne any fruits the PalaPentassuglia's capacity was increased to just over the 3,500 requirement (3,534) amidst a general refurbishment. After the new arena project was finally abandoned in 2014, the municipal authorities announced a new renovation plan for the PalaPentassuglia in October of that year, that would take its capacity to around 6,000 seats whilst modernising the structure, with the work expected to be delivered prior to the 2015–16 season. However, the project soon ran into bureaucratic quagmires and work did not start in earnest until September 2015, where the lighting was updated to answer Eurocup's requirements, the rest of the refurbishment work is now expected to be started in March 2016. The refurbishment didn't give to the arena more seating. However, a new plan to build a brand new Arena were presented in 2018 and, after several levels of bureaucratic authorization, the municipality authorities, thanks to private investors and government funding, announced that the New Arena received all the necessary authorization to finally be built. The new project has been revealed to the public and the tender for the construction has been assigned. The New Arena will be finalised by 2023 and will have 6500 seating and the possibility to host more events and sports, being an opportunity for the City of Brindisi to increment their tourism and revenue.

== Players ==
=== Current roster ===
Note: Flags indicate national team eligibility at FIBA-sanctioned events. Players may hold other non-FIBA nationalities not displayed.

New Basket Brindisi roster
Players
Coaches

Pos.	No.	Nat.	Name	Ht.	Age
G	0	(United States)	Ray, Kendrick	1.86 m (6 ft 1 in)	32 – 26 January 1994
F	1	(Italy)	Errico, Goffredo	2.00 m (6 ft 7 in)	17 – 10 January 2009
G	3	(United States)	Ellis, El	1.91 m (6 ft 3 in)	26 – 18 December 1999
G	7	(Italy)	Caroti, Lorenzo	1.85 m (6 ft 1 in)	29 – 14 July 1997
SG	8	(Italy)	Mastellari, Martino	1.94 m (6 ft 4 in)	30 – 3 January 1996
G/F	9	(Italy)	Bolpin, Riccardo	1.97 m (6 ft 6 in)	29 – 9 February 1997
F	10	(Italy)	Del Cadia, Edoardo	2.02 m (6 ft 8 in)	27 – 10 March 1999
PF	11	(Italy)	Miani, Gabriele	2.04 m (6 ft 8 in)	25 – 11 October 2000
F	12	(Italy)	Esposito, Ethan	2.00 m (6 ft 7 in)	26 – 22 October 1999
SF	15	(Italy)	Fantoma, Tommaso	1.97 m (6 ft 6 in)	22 – 23 October 2003
F/C	22	(United States)	Williams, JaCorey	2.03 m (6 ft 8 in)	32 – 12 June 1994
PG	40	(Italy)	Cinciarini, Andrea	1.93 m (6 ft 4 in)	40 – 21 June 1986

Head coach

- (Italy) Nicola Brienza

Assistant coach(es)

- (Italy) Marco Esposito
- (Italy) Marco Cardillo

Legend

- (C) Team captain
- Injured

- Roster
Updated: September 1, 2026

== Season by season ==
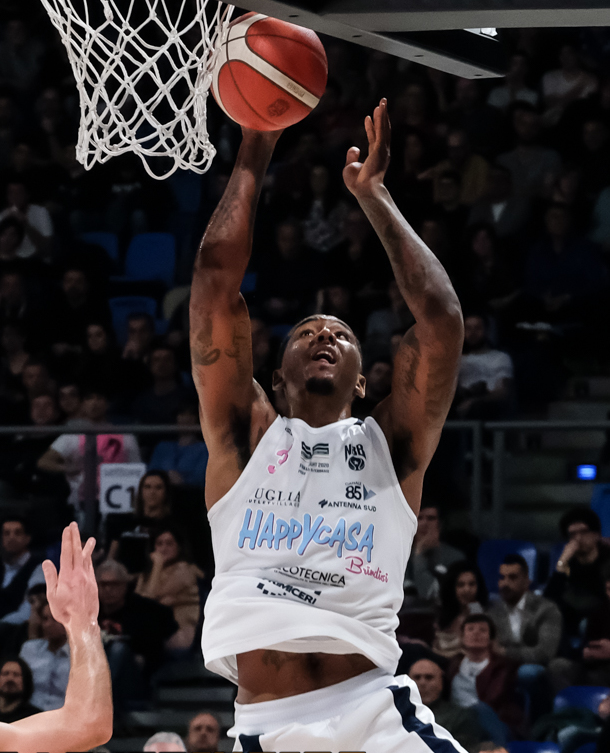
Tyler Stone

Season	Tier	League	Pos.	Cup competitions		European competitions	
2009–10	2	LegaDue	1st	LNP Cup	RU		
2010–11	1	Serie A	16th				
2011–12	2	LegaDue	2nd	LNP Cup	C		
2012–13	1	Serie A	12th				
2013–14	1	Serie A	6th	Italian Cup	SF		
2014–15	1	Serie A	6th	Italian Cup	SF	3 EuroChallenge	QF
2015–16	1	Serie A	10th			2 Eurocup	RS
2016–17	1	LBA	9th	Italian Cup	QF		
2017–18	1	LBA	14th				
2018–19	1	LBA	5th	Italian Cup	RU		
2019–20	1	LBA	5th	Italian Cup	RU	3 Champions League	RS
2020–21	1	LBA	3rd	Italian Cup	SF	3 Champions League	PO
2021–22	1	LBA	11th			3 Champions League	RS
2022–23	1	LBA	7th			4 Europe Cup	RS
2023–24	1	LBA	16th			4 Europe Cup	RS
2024–25	1	Serie A2	7th				

== Honours ==
=== Domestic competitions ===
- LegaDue
  - Champions (1): 2010
- LegaDue Cup
  - Winners (1): 2012
- Italian Cup

Runners-up (2): 2019 2020

=== Other competitions ===
- Brindisi, Italy Invitational Game
  - Winners (1): 2014
- Trofeo Memorial Elio Pentassuglia
  - Winners (1): 2018

== Notable players ==
2020s

- (United States) Xavier Sneed

2010s

- (United States) Nic Moore 1 season: '16–'17
- (Jamaica) Samardo Samuels 1 season: '17–'present
- (France) Amath M'Baye 1 season: '16–'present
- (Italy) Andrea Zerini 4 seasons: '11–'present
- (Italy) Massimo Bulleri 2 seasons: '13–'15
- (Guyana) Delroy James 2 seasons: '13–'15
- (United States) Jerome Dyson 1 season: '13–'14
- (United States) Jonathan Gibson 1 season: '12–'13
- (France) Yakhouba Diawara 1 season: '10–'11
- (United States) Bobby Dixon 1 season: '10–'11
- (United States) Robert Carter
- (Republic of the Congo) Junior Etou
- (United States) Demonte Harper
- (United States) Tyler Stone

2000s

- (Italy) Nikola Radulovic 2 seasons: '09–'10, '10–'11
- (United States) Joe Crispin 1 season: '09–'10
- (United States) Omar Thomas 1 season: '09–'10

== Notable coaches ==
- (Italy) Massimo Bianchi 1 seasons: '04–'05
- (Italy) Giovanni Perdichizzi 2 seasons: '08–'10
- (Italy) Piero Bucchi 4 seasons: '11–'16
- (Italy) Romeo Sacchetti 1 season: '16–'17

== Logos ==
New Basket Brindisi logo (until 2017)

== Sponsorship names ==
Throughout the years, due to sponsorship, the club has been known as:

- Prefabbricati Pugliesi Brindisi (2004–2008)
- Enel Brindisi (2008–2017)
- Happy Casa Brindisi (2018–2021)
