= Pallacanestro Trieste =

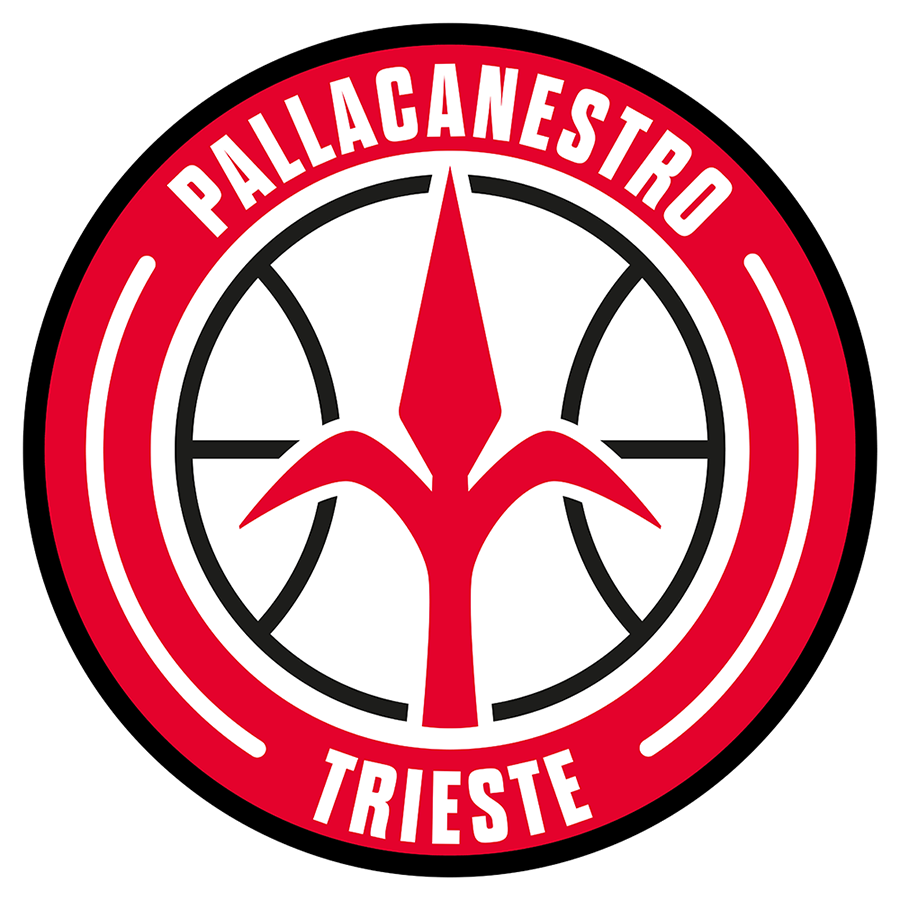
- Leagues: LBA
- Founded: 1975; 51 years ago
- History: Pallacanestro Trieste (1975–2004); Pallacanestro Trieste 2004 (2004–present)
- Arena: PalaTrieste
- Capacity: 6,943
- Location: Trieste, Italy
- Team colors: White, red
- President: Paul Matiasic
- Head coach: Francesco Taccetti
- Team captain: Lodovico Deangeli
- Championships: 5 Italian Leagues; 2 Serie A2
- Website: pallacanestrotrieste.it
Home	Away

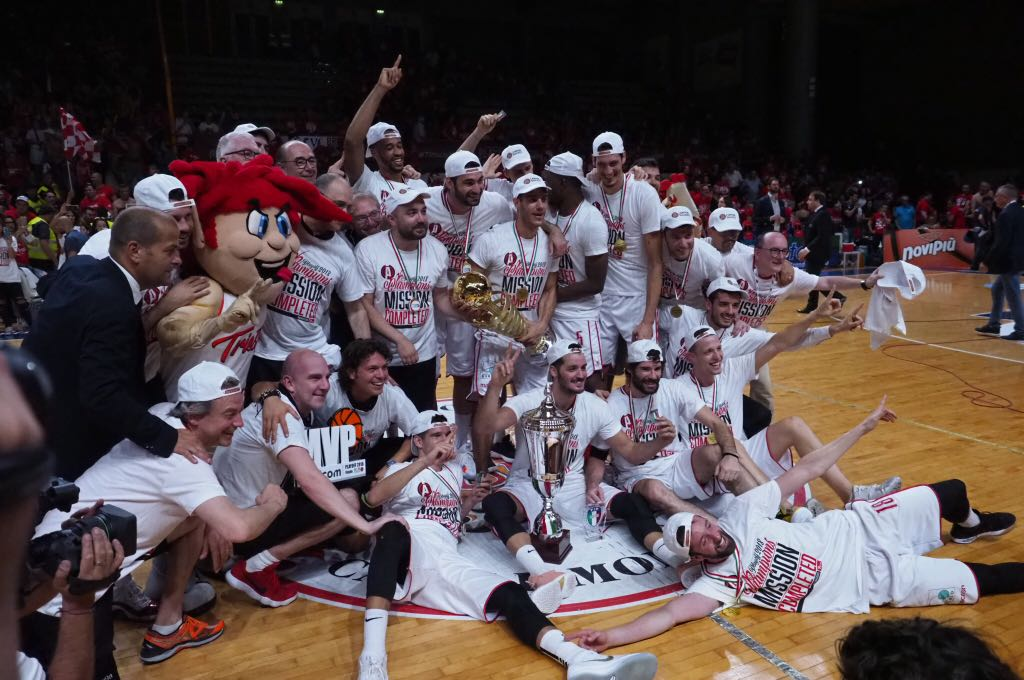
Players celebrating after the 2018 Serie A2 championship

Pallacanestro Trieste 2004 is an Italian professional basketball club based in Trieste. They played in the Lega Basket Serie A (LBA) for five seasons (2018–19 to 2022–23 season); after winning playoffs of Serie A2 in 2023–24 season they are going to join again Lega Basket Serie A in the 2024–25 season. The PalaTrieste serves as the club's home arena.

== History ==
A number of Trieste teams had played in the first division Serie A, the most successful of which was Società Ginnastica Triestina (from the 1930s to the 1960s) that won several national championships in the 1930s and 1940s. Three other top division Trieste sides were Lega Nazionale Trieste (1949-1951), San Giusto Trieste (1948-1949) and Polizia Civile Trieste (1949-1950).

Pallacanestro Trieste was established in 1975, it played in the top tier Serie A from 1982 to 1986, 1990 to 1997 and again from 1999 to 2004, with a best result of third in 1994. That same year, it reached the FIBA Korać Cup final. The next season saw the team reaching the Italian Cup final.

After the 2003-04 season, the club went bankrupt and was relegated to the lower divisions.

After many years spent between the third and fourth division, in 2010 Eugenio Dalmasson was appointed Head Coach. Finally in 2012, the team reached the promotion to the second division with a win against Chieti in an epic game-5 in front of 6000 people.

On June 16, 2018, Trieste won the 2017–18 Serie A2 season after beating Novipiù Casale Monferrato at game 3 of league's playoffs, and returned in LBA, the highest-tier of the Italian basketball league system after 14 years of absence.

On June 26, 2018, Luigi Scavone, the main owner of the title sponsor Alma Agenzia per il lavoro, became new president of Trieste, while the former president Gianluca Mauro became new CEO of the club.

On May 7, 2019, Gianluca Mauro became again president and CEO of the club looking for new sponsorship.

On November 29, 2019, the insurance company Allianz, became new title sponsor and main sponsor of Pallacanestro Trieste for the following three seasons. This sponsorship lapsed at the end of the 2021-2022 season.

In January, 2023, 90% of the club was acquired by San Francisco-based Cotogna Sports Group with the remaining 10% by Trieste-based Trieste Basket. Pallacanestro Trieste's first Board of Directors of the CSG era consists of five members, four of whom are nominated by Cotogna Sports Group: they are Richard de Meo (Chairman), Fitzann R. Reid (Vice Chairman), Connor Barwin (Vice Chairman), and Mario Ghiacci (Vice Chairman and General Manager); the fifth member is chosen by the minority shareholder, Trieste Basket srl, who have appointed Trieste manager Andrea Bochicchio.

== Players ==
=== Current roster ===
Note: Flags indicate national team eligibility at FIBA-sanctioned events. Players may hold other non-FIBA nationalities not displayed.

Pallacanestro Trieste roster
Players
Coaches

Pos.	No.	Nat.	Name	Ht.	Wt.	Age
PG	4	(United States)	Ross, Colbey	1.85 m (6 ft 1 in)	84 kg (185 lb)	28 – 22 October 1998
F	7	(Italy)	Canka, Abramo	2.00 m (6 ft 7 in)	90 kg (198 lb)	24 – 18 March 2002
F/C	8	(Italy)	Deangeli, Lodovico	2.05 m (6 ft 9 in)	90 kg (198 lb)	26 – 19 May 2000
PG	9	(United States)	Galloway, Langston	1.85 m (6 ft 1 in)	91 kg (201 lb)	34 – 9 December 1991
PG	10	(Italy)	Ruzzier, Michele	1.83 m (6 ft 0 in)	80 kg (176 lb)	33 – 9 February 1993
PF	11	(Italy)	Martucci, Emanuele	1.97 m (6 ft 6 in)	88 kg (194 lb)	19 – 3 August 2007
C	13	(Italy)	Candussi, Francesco	2.13 m (7 ft 0 in)	109 kg (240 lb)	32 – 23 February 1994
SG	15	(Italy)	Paiano, Davide	1.98 m (6 ft 6 in)	94 kg (207 lb)	21 – 26 May 2005
F/C	17	(Austria)	Brajković, Luka	2.08 m (6 ft 10 in)	113 kg (249 lb)	27 – 26 June 1999
G/F	25	(United States)	Jones, Lajae	2.01 m (6 ft 7 in)	100 kg (220 lb)	22 – 21 May 2004
SF	30	(United States)	McDermott, Sean	1.98 m (6 ft 6 in)	88 kg (194 lb)	29 – 3 November 1996

Head coach

- (Italy) Francesco Taccetti

Assistant coach(es)

- (Italy) Francesco Nanni

Legend

- (C) Team captain
- Injured

- Roster
Updated: October 30, 2026

=== Depth chart ===
Pos.	Starting 5	Bench 1	Bench 2
C	Francesco Candussi	Lodovico Deangeli	Luka Brajković
PF	Abramo Canka	Emanuele Martucci
SF	Sean McDermott
SG	Lajae Jones	Davide Paiano
PG	Michele Ruzzier	Colbey Ross	Langston Galloway

(colors: Italian or homegrown players; foreign players; young players)

== Honours ==
=== Domestic competitions ===
- Italian League

Winners (5): 1930, 1932, 1934, 1939–40, 1940–41 (as Gimnastica Triestina)
3rd place (1): 1993–94

- Italian Cup

Runners-up (1): 1995

- Serie A2 Basket

Winners (2): 2017–18, 2023–24

- Serie B1 north east division

Winners (1): 2011–12

=== European competitions ===
- FIBA Korać Cup (defunct)

Runners-up (1): 1993–94

=== Other competitions ===
- FIBA International Christmas Tournament (defunct)

Runners-up (1): 1993

== Notable players ==
Note: Flags indicate national team eligibility at FIBA-sanctioned events. Players may hold other non-FIBA nationalities not displayed.

Criteria

To appear in this section a player must have either:

- Set a club record or won an individual award while at the club
- Played at least one official international match for their national team at any time
- Played at least one official NBA match at any time.

- (Italy) Alberto Tonut 8 seasons: '79-'84, '94-'97
- (United States) Marvin Barnes 1 season: '80
- (United States) Michael Jordan exhibition game in 1985
- (Italy) Davide Cantarello 5 seasons: '89-'94
- (Italy) Alessandro De Pol 5 seasons: '89-'94
- (Italy) Claudio Pilutti 5 seasons: '89-'94
- (United States) Terry Tyler 1 season: '89-'90
- (Slovenia) (Italy) Gregor Fučka 4 seasons: '90-'94
- (Italy) Dino Meneghin 3 seasons: '90-'93
- (United States) Sylvester Gray 2 seasons: '90-'92
- (Serbia) Dejan Bodiroga 2 seasons: '92-'94
- (Italy) Ferdinando Gentile 1 season: '93-'94
- (United States) Lemone Lampley 1 season: '93-'94
- (United States) Steve Burtt Sr. 2 seasons: '94-'95, '96-'97
- (United States) Kevin Thompson 1 season: '94-'95
- (United States) Pete Chilcutt 1 season: '94-'95
- (United States) Jevon Crudup 1 season: '95-'96
- (Italy) Aniello Laezza 5 seasons: '96-'01
- (Bosnia and Herzegovina) (Slovenia) Teoman Alibegović 2 seasons: '96-'97, '98-'99
- (United States) Darnell Robinson 1 season: '96-'97
- (Bosnia and Herzegovina) (Croatia) Ivica Marić 4 seasons: '97-'98, '99-'00, '01-'03
- (United States) Irving Thomas 1 season: '97-'98
- (United States) Ed O'Bannon 1 season: '97-'98
- (United States) (Republic of Ireland) Ron Rowan 1 season: '99-'00
- (United States) Conrad McRae 1 season: '99-'00
- (United States) (Italy) Dante Calabria 1 season: '00-'01
- (United States) (Italy) Casey Shaw 1 season: '00-'01
- (Serbia) (Greece) Milan Gurović 1 season: '00-'01
- (United States) Scoonie Penn 1 season: '00-'01
- (United States) Nate Erdmann 2 seasons: '01-'03
- (Croatia) Siniša Kelečević 1 season: '02-'03
- (United States) Terrance Roberson 1 season: '02-'03
- (United States) (Puerto Rico) Sharif Fajardo 1 season: '03-'04
- (United States) Alvin Sims 1 season: '03-'04
- (United States) Billy Thomas 1 season: '03-'04
- (United States) Brian Oliver 1 season: '03-'04
- (United States) (Montenegro) Javonte Green 2 season: ‘16-‘18
- (United States) Ty-Shon Alexander 1 season: '22

== Sponsorship names ==
In the past, due to sponsorship deals, it has also been known as:

- Arrigoni Trieste (1955–1956)
- Stock Trieste (1957–1960)
- Philco Trieste (1961–1963)
- Lloyd Adriatico Trieste (1974–1975)
- Hurlingham Trieste (1976–1981)
- Oece Trieste (1981–1982)
- Bic Trieste (1982–1984)
- Stefanel Trieste (1984–1994)
- Illy Caffè Trieste (1994–1996)
- Genertel Trieste (1996–1998)
- Lineltex Trieste (1997–1999)
- Telit Trieste (1999–2001)
- Coop Nordest Trieste (2001–2004)
- AcegasAps Trieste (2005–2013)
- Pallacanestro Trieste (2013–2015)
- Alma Pallacanestro Trieste (2015–2019)
- Pallacanestro Trieste (2019)
- Allianz Pallacanestro Trieste (2019–2022)
- Pallacanestro Trieste (2022–present)

== Kit manufacturer ==
- 2017–2018: Macron
- 2018–2022: Adidas
- 2022–2025: Macron
- 2024–present: Nike
