= 2020–21 Pallacanestro Cantù season =

Italian basketball season

Pallacanestro Cantù
2020-21 season
- Owner: Tutti Insieme Cantù S.r.l.
- President: Roberto Allievi
- Head coach: Piero Bucchi
- Arena: PalaDesio
- LBA: Relegated to Serie A2 (15th of 15)
- Supercup: Group stage (4th of 4)

The 2020–21 season is Pallacanestro Cantù's 84th in existence and the club's 25th consecutive season in the top tier Italian basketball.

== Kit ==
Supplier: EYE Sport Wear / Sponsor: S.Bernardo

Home	Away

== Players ==
=== Current roster ===
Acqua S.Bernardo Cantù roster
Players
Coaches

Pos.	No.	Nat.	Name	Ht.	Wt.	Age
G	0	(United States)	Gaines, Frank	1.91 m (6 ft 3 in)	88 kg (194 lb)	36 – 7 July 1990
PF	1	(United States)	Thomas, Donte	2.01 m (6 ft 7 in)	104 kg (229 lb)	30 – 6 May 1996
PG	2	(United States)	Smith, Jaime	1.90 m (6 ft 3 in)	83 kg (183 lb)	37 – 11 July 1989
G/F	9	(Italy)	Procida, Gabriele	2.00 m (6 ft 7 in)	88 kg (194 lb)	24 – 1 June 2002
PF	10	(United States)	Leunen, Maarty	2.06 m (6 ft 9 in)	108 kg (238 lb)	41 – 3 September 1985
PF	11	(Italy)	La Torre, Andrea (C)	2.02 m (6 ft 8 in)	101 kg (223 lb)	29 – 14 June 1997
G	22	(United States)	Johnson, Jazz	1.78 m (5 ft 10 in)	86 kg (190 lb)	29 – 26 September 1996
PF	23	(Cameroon)	Bayehe, Jordan	2.04 m (6 ft 8 in)	96 kg (212 lb)	26 – 16 October 1999
SG	25	(Italy)	Baparapè, Biram	1.90 m (6 ft 3 in)	83 kg (183 lb)	29 – 25 April 1997
G/F	32	(Italy)	Pecchia, Andrea	1.97 m (6 ft 6 in)	90 kg (198 lb)	28 – 16 November 1997
C	77	(Croatia)	Radić, Ivica	2.08 m (6 ft 10 in)	111 kg (245 lb)	36 – 8 September 1990

Head coach

- (Italy) Piero Bucchi

Assistant coach(es)

- (Italy) Marco Gandini
- (Italy) Antonio Visciglia

Legend

- (C) Team captain
- Injured

- Roster
Updated: 10 May 2021

Note: Flags indicate national team eligibility at FIBA-sanctioned events. Players may hold other non-FIBA nationalities not displayed.

=== Depth chart ===
Pos.	Starting 5	Bench 1	Bench 2
C	Ivica Radić	Jordan Bayehe
PF	Donte Thomas	Maarty Leunen
SF	Andrea Pecchia	Gabriele Procida	Andrea La Torre
SG	Frank Gaines	Biram Baparapè
PG	Jaime Smith	Jazz Johnson

6+6 format (colours: Italian or homegrown players; foreign players; young players)

=== Squad changes ===
==== In ====
No.	Pos.	Nat.	Name	Age	Moving from		Type	Ends	Transfer fee	Date	Source
1	PF	(United States)	Donte Thomas	24	Donar Groningen	(Netherlands)	1 year	June 2021	Free	22 June 2020	
23	PF	(Cameroon) (Italy)	Jordan Bayehe	20	Roseto Sharks	(Italy)	2 years	June 2022	Free	27 June 2020	
3	C	(United States)	Sha'markus Kennedy	22	McNeese State Cowboys	(United States)	1 year	June 2021	Free	4 July 2020	
2	PG	(United States)	Jaime Smith	31	Dinamo Sassari	(Italy)	1 year	June 2021	Free	11 July 2020	
8	SG	(United States)	James Woodard	26	Medi Bayreuth	(Germany)	1 year	June 2021	Free	16 July 2020	
10	PF	(United States)	Maarty Leunen	34	Fortitudo Bologna	(Italy)	1 year	June 2021	Free	21 July 2020	
22	G	(United States)	Jazz Johnson	23	Nevada Wolf Pack	(United States)	1 year	June 2021	Free	29 July 2020	
13	F/C	(United Kingdom)	Kavell Bigby-Williams	25	Fort Wayne Mad Ants	(United States)	1 year	June 2021	Free	14 December 2020	
0	G	(United States)	Frank Gaines	30	Bnei Herzliya Basket	(Israel)	1 year	June 2021	Undisclosed	4 January 2021	
77	C	(Croatia)	Ivica Radić	30	Anwil Włocławek	(Poland)	1 year	June 2021	Undisclosed	27 March 2021	

1. In players: Players who signed after the beginning of the season

==== Out ====
No.	Pos.	Nat.	Name	Age	Moving to		Type	Transfer fee	Date	Source
13	C	(United States)	Kevarrius Hayes	23	ASVEL	(France)	End of contract	Free	8 June 2020	
22	SG	(United States)	Jason Burnell	23	Dinamo Sassari	(Italy)	End of contract	Free	1 July 2020	
10	G	(United States)	Wes Clark	25	SIG Strasbourg	(France)	End of contract	Free	26 June 2020	
27	C	(Italy)	Alessandro Simioni	22	Basket Ravenna	(Italy)	End of contract	Free	1 July 2020	
0	SG	(United States)	Rodney Purvis	26	Bergamo Basket 2014	(Italy)	End of contract	Free	1 July 2020	
1	SG	(United States)	Cameron Young	23	Cherkaski Mavpy	(Ukraine)	End of contract	Free	1 July 2020	
19	PF	(United States) (Portugal)	Jeremiah Wilson	32	Al-Ittihad Jeddah	(Saudi Arabia)	End of contract	Free	1 July 2020	
20	G	(Liberia) (United States)	Joe Ragland	30	Hapoel Eilat	(Israel)	End of contract	Free	1 July 2020	
8	SG	(United States)	James Woodard	26	Peristeri	(Greece)	Transfer	Undisclosed	19 January 2021	
13	F/C	(United Kingdom)	Kavell Bigby-Williams	25	Antwerp Giants	(Belgium)	Transfer	Undisclosed	11 March 2021	
3	C	(United States)	Sha'markus Kennedy	21	Rasta Vechta	(Germany)	Transfer	Undisclosed	1 April 2021	

1. Out players: Players who left before the end of the season

==== Confirmed ====
No.	Pos.	Nat.	Name	Age	Moving from		Type	Ends	Transfer fee	Date	Source
25	SG	(Italy)	Biram Baparapè	23	USA Basket Empoli	(Italy)	3 year	June 2021	Free	19 September 2018	
11	PF	(Italy)	Andrea La Torre	23	Amici Udinese	(Italy)	3 year	June 2021	Free	8 November 2018	
32	G/F	(Italy)	Andrea Pecchia	22	Treviglio	(Italy)	1 + 1 year	June 2021	Free	25 June 2019	
9	SG	(Italy)	Gabriele Procida	17	Team ABC Cantù	(Italy)	1 + 4 years	June 2024	Free	24 August 2019	

==== Coach ====
Nat.	Name	Age.	Previous team		Type	Ends	Start Date	Status	End date
(Italy)	Piero Bucchi	62	Virtus Roma	(Italy)	end of the season	June 2021	26 January 2021	active	
(Italy)	Cesare Pancotto	65	Poderosa Montegranaro	(Italy)	2 years	June 2021	11 June 2019	Sacked	25 January 2021

== Competitions ==
=== Supercup ===
Pos	Team	Pld	W	L	PF	PA	PD	Qualification
1	AX Armani Exchange Milano	6	6	0	576	433	+143	Advance to Final Four
2	Germani Basket Brescia	6	3	3	499	515	−16	
3	Openjobmetis Varese	6	2	4	500	548	−48	
4	S.Bernardo Cantù	6	1	5	444	523	−79	

Source: LegaBasket Serie A
Rules for classification: All points scored in extra period(s) were not counted in the standings, nor for any tie-break situation.

=== Serie A ===
Pos	Team	Pld	W	L	PF	PA	PD	Qualification
12	Fortitudo Lavoropiù Bologna	28	10	18	2179	2291	−112	
13	Carpegna Prosciutto Basket Pesaro	28	10	18	2271	2364	−93	
14	Openjobmetis Varese	28	10	18	2271	2433	−162	
15	Acqua S.Bernardo Cantù	28	9	19	2179	2313	−134	Relegation to Serie A2
16	Virtus Roma	0	0	0	0	0	0	Disqualified

Updated to match(es) played on 10 May 2021. Source: LBA

== See also ==
- 2020–21 LBA season
- 2020 Italian Basketball Supercup
