= 2020–21 Vanoli Cremona season =

Italian basketball season

Vanoli Cremona
2020-21 season
- Owner: Guerino Vanoli Basket srl
- President: Aldo Vanoli
- Head coach: Paolo Galbiati
- Arena: Palasport Mario Radi
- LBA: 10th of 15
- Supercup: Group stage (4th of 4)

The 2020–21 season is Vanoli Cremona's 22nd in existence and the club's 11th consecutive season in the top tier Italian basketball.

== Overview ==
The 2019-20 season ended with no winners due to the coronavirus pandemic and economical issues started to arise in the club. President Aldo Vanoli called the community for help and, at the end, he found new investors and managed to submit the subscription to the 2020–21 LBA season.

Meanwhile, in this first period of uncertainty, almost all players, except of Topias Palmi, were released. With the hiring of Paolo Galbiati as head coach, Cremona started building the team from the start.

With coach Galbiati the team had a decent performance such that he was renewed until 2023.

== Kit ==
Supplier: Errea / Sponsor: Vanoli

Home	Away

== Players ==
=== Current roster ===
Vanoli Basket Cremona roster
Players
Coaches

Pos.	No.	Nat.	Name	Ht.	Wt.	Age
SG	0	(United States)	Barford, Jaylen	1.91 m (6 ft 3 in)	92 kg (203 lb)	30 – 23 January 1996
PG	3	(United States)	Williams, T. J.	1.90 m (6 ft 3 in)	93 kg (205 lb)	31 – 26 October 1994
SG	4	(Serbia)	Trunić, Lazar	1.98 m (6 ft 6 in)	95 kg (209 lb)	25 – 4 October 2000
PF	6	(United States)	Williams, Jarvis	2.02 m (6 ft 8 in)	98 kg (216 lb)	33 – 21 January 1993
PG	8	(Italy)	Poeta, Giuseppe (C)	1.90 m (6 ft 3 in)	78 kg (172 lb)	41 – 12 September 1985
SG	9	(Italy)	Mian, Fabio	1.96 m (6 ft 5 in)	88 kg (194 lb)	34 – 7 February 1992
F/C	24	(United States)	Lee, Marcus	2.08 m (6 ft 10 in)	102 kg (225 lb)	32 – 14 September 1994
G	25	(Italy)	Cournooh, David	1.87 m (6 ft 2 in)	83 kg (183 lb)	36 – 28 July 1990
SF	34	(United States)	Hommes, Daulton	2.03 m (6 ft 8 in)	98 kg (216 lb)	30 – 4 July 1996
C	73	(Italy)	Donda, Andrea	2.11 m (6 ft 11 in)	106 kg (234 lb)	27 – 11 August 1999

Head coach

- (Italy) Paolo Galbiati

Assistant coach(es)

- (Italy) Pierluigi Brotto
- (Italy) Roberto Spoto

Legend

- (C) Team captain
- Injured

- Roster
Updated: 10 May 2021

Note: Flags indicate national team eligibility at FIBA-sanctioned events. Players may hold other non-FIBA nationalities not displayed.

=== Depth chart ===
Pos.	Starting 5	Bench
C	Marcus Lee	Jarvis Williams
PF	Daulton Hommes	Andre Donda
SF	Fabio Mian	Jaylen Barford
SG	David Cournooh	Lazar Trunić
PG	T. J. Williams	Giuseppe Poeta

5+5 format (colours: Italian or homegrown players; foreign players; young players)

=== Squad changes ===
==== In ====
No.	Pos.	Nat.	Name	Age	Moving from		Type	Ends	Transfer fee	Date	Source
9	SG	(Italy)	Fabio Mian	28	Aquila Basket Trento	(Italy)	1+1 years	June 2021 + 2022	Free	4 August 2020	
25	G	(Italy)	David Cournooh	30	Virtus Bologna	(Italy)	1 year	June 2021	Free	4 August 2020	
8	PG	(Italy)	Giuseppe Poeta	34	Reggio Emilia	(Italy)	1+1 years	June 2021 + 2022	Undisclosed	5 August 2020	
6	PF	(United States)	Jarvis Williams	27	ZZ Leiden	(Netherlands)	1 year	June 2021	Free	7 August 2020	
4	SG	(Serbia)	Lazar Trunić	19	Cremona Sansebasket	(Italy)	1 year	June 2021	Free	8 August 2020	
73	C	(Italy)	Andrea Donda	20	Orlandina Basket	(Italy)	1 year	June 2021	Free	8 August 2020	
24	F/C	(United States)	Marcus Lee	25	Sioux Falls Skyforce	(United States)	1 year	June 2021	Free	9 August 2020	
3	PG	(United States)	T. J. Williams	25	Hapoel Be'er Sheva	(Israel)	1 year	June 2021	Free	10 August 2020	
34	SF	(United States)	Daulton Hommes	24	Austin Spurs	(United States)	1 year	June 2021	Free	14 August 2020	
0	SG	(United States)	Jaylen Barford	24	Al Ittihad Alexandria	(Egypt)	End of the season	June 2021	Free	8 January 2021	

1. In players: Players who signed after the beginning of the season

==== Out ====
No.	Pos.	Nat.	Name	Age	Moving to		Type	Transfer fee	Date	Source
21	G/F	(Italy)	Niccolò De Vico	25	Pallacanestro Varese	(Italy)	Mutual consent	Undisclosed	11 June 2020	
23	G/F	(Serbia)	Vojislav Stojanović	23	Fortitudo Bologna	(Italy)	Mutual consent	Undisclosed	13 June 2020	
13	C	(Croatia)	Josip Sobin	30	Stal Ostrów Wielkopolski	(Poland)	End of contract	Free	21 June 2020	
10	PG	(Italy)	Michele Ruzzier	27	Pallacanestro Varese	(Italy)	Mutual consent	Undisclosed	23 June 2020	
45	F	(Italy)	Nicola Akele	22	Universo Treviso Basket	(Italy)	Mutual consent	Undisclosed	26 June 2020	
1	SG	(United States)	Wesley Saunders	27	Monaco Basket	(France)	End of contract	Free	1 July 2020	
2	SG	(United States)	Jordan Mathews	26	Enisey	(Russia)	End of contract	Free	1 July 2020	
5	PG	(Italy)	Giacomo Sanguinetti	30	N.P.C. Rieti	(Italy)	End of contract	Free	1 July 2020	
7	PG	(Italy) (United States)	Travis Diener	38	Free agent		End of contract	Free	1 July 2020	
22	F/C	(United States)	Ethan Happ	24	Fortitudo Bologna	(Italy)	Transfer	Undisclosed	10 July 2020	
31	SG	(Finland)	Topias Palmi	26	Free agent		Mutual consent	Undisclosed	12 April 2021	

1. Out players: Players who left before the end of the season

==== Confirmed ====
No.	Pos.	Nat.	Name	Age	Moving from		Type	Ends	Transfer fee	Date	Source
31	SG	(Finland)	Topias Palmi	25	Kataja	(Finland)	3 years	June 2022	Free	27 June 2019	

==== Coach ====
Coach Galbiati was extended at the end of January until 2023.

Nat.	Name	Age.	Previous team		Type	Ends	Date	Replaces		Date	Type
(Italy)	Paolo Galbiati	36	(Italy)	Pallacanestro Biella	1+1 + 2 years	June 2023	30 July 2020	(Italy)	Romeo Sacchetti	15 June 2017	Mutual consent

== Competitions ==
=== Supercup ===
Pos	Team	Pld	W	L	PF	PA	PD	Qualification
1	Segafredo Virtus Bologna	6	5	1	490	428	+62	Advance to Final Four
2	UnaHotels Reggio Emilia	6	3	3	479	477	+2	
3	Lavoropiù Fortitudo Bologna	6	3	3	506	496	+10	
4	Vanoli Cremona	6	1	5	408	482	−74	

Source: LegaBasket Serie A
Rules for classification: All points scored in extra period(s) were not counted in the standings, nor for any tie-break situation.

=== Serie A ===
Pos	Team	Pld	W	L	PF	PA	PD	Qualification
8	Dolomiti Energia Trento	28	13	15	2191	2228	−37	Qualification to Playoffs
9	Germani Basket Brescia	28	11	17	2299	2389	−90	
10	Vanoli Cremona	28	11	17	2370	2395	−25	
11	UNAHOTELS Reggio Emilia	28	10	18	2122	2261	−139	
12	Fortitudo Lavoropiù Bologna	28	10	18	2179	2291	−112	

Updated to match(es) played on 10 May 2021. Source: LBA

== See also ==
- 2020–21 LBA season
- 2020 Italian Basketball Supercup
