= 2020–21 LBA season =

LBA
- League: Lega Basket Serie A
- Season: 2020–21
- Dates: September 26, 2020 – June 11, 2021
- Games played: 2,010
- Teams: 15
- TV partners: Eurosport, Rai Sport

Regular season
- Top seed: AX Armani Exchange Milano
- Season MVP: (Italy) Stefano Tonut

LBA Finals
- Champions: Virtus Segafredo Bologna
- Runners-up: AX Armani Exchange Milano
- Semi-finalists: Umana Reyer Venezia; Happy Casa Brindisi
- Finals MVP: (Serbia) Miloš Teodosić

Awards
- Best Italian player: (Italy) Stefano Tonut
- Best under 22: (Italy) Alessandro Pajola
- Best revelation: (United States) JaCorey Williams
- Best defender: (United States) Kyle Hines
- Best coach: (Italy) Francesco Vitucci
- Best manager: (Italy) Simone Giofrè

Statistical leaders
Points	(United States) D'Angelo Harrison	18.6
Rebounds	(United States) Tyler Cain	9.0
Assists	(Italy) Giuseppe Poeta	6.8
Efficiency	(Croatia) Miro Bilan	22.8

Records
- Biggest home win: 40; Milano 104–64 Treviso (October 4, 2020)
- Biggest away win: 31; Sassari 77–108 V.Bologna (April 3, 2021)
- Highest scoring: 207 points Cantù 106–101 Sassari (May 10, 2021)
- Winning streak: 9 games AX Armani Exchange Milano; Happy Casa Brindisi
- Losing streak: 8 games Dolomiti Energia Trento

Lega Basket Serie A seasons
- ← 2019–20 2021–22 →
- All statistics correct as of May 10, 2021.

The 2020–21 LBA season was the 99th season of the Lega Basket Serie A (LBA), the men's top tier professional basketball division of the Italian basketball league system. The regular season started on September 26, 2020, and finished on May 2, 2021.

On 11 June, Virtus Segafredo Bologna won its 16th title, defeating 4–0 AX Armani Exchange Milano in the national finals.

== Teams ==
=== Promotion and relegation (pre-season) ===
For he new season, after the first wave of coronavirus pandemic in Italy, the Serie A league decided to bring the number of teams from 17 of the previous season, to 18. Because the 2019–20 season was interrupted without winners and relegated, it was decided that one team from the Serie A2 had to be promoted to the Serie A.

But four teams, Roma, Pistoia, Cremona and U.S. Victoria Libertas Pallacanestro, were going through financial trouble which put at risk their participation to the 2020–21 season. Among them only Pistoia couldn't finalize the subscription and therefore relegated to the Serie A2.

Basket Torino first and then Scaligera Verona were invited to the highest league but they both declined, so that the final number of the teams was set to be 16.

=== Virtus Roma withdrawal ===
In December Virtus Roma had to face an unsustainable financial crisis. Claudio Toti (owner of the team) was looking for an exchange of ownership but no relevant offer was made that could save the team from an inevitable bankruptcy. At the end, on December 9, the final decision was taken and the official withdrawal from the league was submitted to the Italian Basketball Federation. At that moment Roma had played 9 games with only 2 wins and was holding the 15th position in the league table.

All the games from Virtus Roma were voided and the team disappeared from the official website.

=== Venues and locations ===
Location of teams in 2020–21 LBA season

Team	Home city	Arena	Capacity	2019–20 result
Acqua S.Bernardo Cantù	Cantù	PalaBancoDesio	6,700	11th
Allianz Pallacanestro Trieste	Trieste	Allianz Dome	6,943	16th
AX Armani Exchange Milano	Milan	Mediolanum Forum	12,700	4th
Banco di Sardegna Sassari	Sassari	PalaSerradimigni	5,000	2nd
Carpegna Prosciutto Basket Pesaro	Pesaro	Vitifrigo Arena	10,323	17th
De'Longhi Treviso	Treviso	PalaVerde	5,134	13th
Dolomiti Energia Trento	Trento	BLM Group Arena	4,360	9th
Fortitudo Lavoropiù Bologna	Bologna	Unipol Arena	8,400	8th
Germani Brescia	Brescia	PalaLeonessa	5,200	3rd
Happy Casa Brindisi	Brindisi	PalaPentassuglia	3,534	5th
Openjobmetis Varese	Varese	Enerxenia Arena	5,100	10th
Umana Reyer Venezia	Venice	Palasport Taliercio	3,506	7th
UNAHOTELS Reggio Emilia	Reggio Emilia	Unipol Arena	8,400	12th
Vanoli Basket Cremona	Cremona	PalaRadi	3,511	6th
Virtus Segafredo Bologna	Bologna	Segafredo Arena	9,700	1st
Virtus Roma (disqualified)	Rome	PalaLottomatica	11,200	14th

=== Personnel and sponsorship ===
Team	Head coach	Captain	Kit manufacturer	Shirt sponsor
Acqua S.Bernardo Cantù	(Italy) Piero Bucchi	(Italy) Andrea La Torre	Eye Sport	Acqua S.Bernardo
Allianz Pallacanestro Trieste	(Italy) Eugenio Dalmasson	(Italy) Andrea Coronica	Adidas	Allianz
AX Armani Exchange Milano	(Italy) Ettore Messina	(Italy) Andrea Cinciarini	Armani	AX Armani Exchange
Banco di Sardegna Sassari	(Italy) Gianmarco Pozzecco	(Italy) Giacomo Devecchi	Eye Sport	Banco di Sardegna
Carpegna Prosciutto Basket Pesaro	(Croatia) Jasmin Repeša	(Argentina) Carlos Delfino	Erreà	Carpegna Prosciutto
De'Longhi Treviso	(Italy) Massimiliano Menetti	(Italy) Matteo Imbrò	Erreà	De'Longhi
Dolomiti Energia Trento	(Italy) Emanuele Molin	(Argentina) Andrés Pablo Forray	Nike	Dolomiti Energia
Fortitudo Lavoropiù Bologna	(Italy) Luca Dalmonte	(Italy) Stefano Mancinelli	Nike	Lavoropiù
Germani Brescia	(Italy) Maurizio Buscaglia	(United States) David Moss	Erreà	Germani Trasporti
Happy Casa Brindisi	(Italy) Francesco Vitucci	(Italy) Alessandro Zanelli	Adidas	Happy Casa
Openjobmetis Varese	(Italy) Massimo Bulleri	(Italy) Giancarlo Ferrero	Macron	Openjobmetis
Umana Reyer Venezia	(Italy) Walter De Raffaele	(Greece) Michael Bramos	Erreà	Umana
UNAHOTELS Reggio Emilia	(Italy) Attilio Caja	(Italy) Leonardo Candi	Adidas	UNAHOTELS
Vanoli Basket Cremona	(Italy) Paolo Galbiati	(Italy) Giuseppe Poeta	Erreà	Ferramenta Vanoli
Virtus Segafredo Bologna	(Serbia) Aleksandar Đorđević	(Italy) Giampaolo Ricci	Macron	Segafredo Zanetti
Virtus Roma (disqualified)	(Italy) Piero Bucchi	(Italy) Tommaso Baldasso	Macron	

=== Managerial changes ===
Team	Outgoing manager	Manner of departure	Date of vacancy	Position in table	Replaced by	Date of appointment
Fortitudo Lavoropiù Bologna	(Italy) Antimo Martino	Mutual consent	27 May 2020	Pre-season	(Italy) Romeo Sacchetti	27 May 2020
UNAHOTELS Reggio Emilia	(Italy) Maurizio Buscaglia	Mutual consent	27 May 2020	Pre-season	(Italy) Antimo Martino	28 May 2020
Vanoli Basket Cremona	(Italy) Romeo Sacchetti	Mutual consent	27 May 2017	Pre-season	(Italy) Paolo Galbiati	30 July 2020
Carpegna Prosciutto Basket Pesaro	(Italy) Giancarlo Sacco	End of contract	1 July 2020	Pre-season	(Croatia) Jasmin Repeša	23 June 2020
Openjobmetis Varese	(Italy) Attilio Caja	Sacked	5 September 2020	Pre-season	(Italy) Massimo Bulleri	8 September 2020
Germani Basket Brescia	(Italy) Vincenzo Esposito	Sacked	1 December 2020	15th (2/7)	(Italy) Maurizio Buscaglia	1 December 2020
Fortitudo Lavoropiù Bologna	(Italy) Romeo Sacchetti	Sacked	6 December 2020	16th (1/8)	(Italy) Luca Dalmonte	7 December 2020
Acqua S.Bernardo Cantù	(Italy) Cesare Pancotto	Sacked	25 January 2021	14th (4/12)	(Italy) Piero Bucchi	26 January 2021
Dolomiti Energia Trento	(Italy) Nicola Brienza	Sacked	31 January 2021	12th (6/11)	(Italy) Emanuele Molin	31 January 2021
UNAHOTELS Reggio Emilia	(Italy) Antimo Martino	Sacked	15 March 2021	14th (7/14)	(Italy) Attilio Caja	16 March 2021

=== Referees ===
A total of 38 FIP officials set to work on the 2020–21 season in Lega Basket Serie A:

- Beniamino Manuel Attard (Siracusa)
- Lorenzo Baldini (Florence)
- Mark Bartoli (Trieste)
- Roberto Begnis (Cremona)
- Mauro Belfiore (Naples)
- Gabriele Bettini (Bologna)
- Andrea Bongiorni (Pisa)
- Matteo Boninsegna (Milan)
- Denny Borgioni (Rome)
- Christian Borgo (Vicenza)
- Federico Brindisi (Turin)
- Gianluca Capotorto (Rome)
- Guido Federico Di Francesco (Teramo)
- Giacomo Dori (Venice)
- Massimiliano Filippini (Bologna)
- Martino Galasso (Siena)
- Guido Giovannetti (Terni)
- Valerio Grigioni (Rome)
- Saverio Lanzarini (Bologna)
- Carmelo Lo Guzzo (Pisa)
- Alessandro Martolini (Rome)
- Manuel Mazzoni (Grosseto)
- Dario Morelli (Brindisi)
- Alessandro Nicolini (Palermo)
- Sergio Noce (Latina)
- Fabrizio Paglialunga (Taranto)
- Carmelo Paternicò (Enna)
- Giulio Pepponi (Perugia)
- Alessandro Perciavalle (Turin)
- Marco Pierantozzi^{E} (Ascoli Piceno)
- Denis Quarta (Turin)
- Michele Rossi (Arezzo)
- Tolga Ozge Sahin (Messina)
- Gianluca Sardella (Rimini)
- Andrea Valzani^{E} (Milan)
- Alessandro Vicino (Bologna)
- Marco Vita (Ancona)

Notes
^E Newly promoted to the Serie A

== Rules ==
Each team is allowed either five or seven foreign players under two formulas:

1. 5 foreigners plus #5 Italian or homegrown players
2. 6 foreigners plus #6 Italian or homegrown players

Each club can choose the 5+5 formula, that consists of five Italian players and five foreign players, or the 6+6 formula.

As in previous seasons, LBA clubs must play in arenas that seat at least 3,500 people.

== Regular season ==
In the regular season, teams play against each other home-and-away in a round-robin format. The matchdays are from September 26, 2020, to May 2, 2021.

=== League table ===
Pos	Team	Pld	W	L	PF	PA	PD	Qualification
1	AX Armani Exchange Milano	28	22	6	2385	2099	+286	Qualification to Playoffs
2	Happy Casa Brindisi	28	20	8	2395	2212	+183	Qualification to Playoffs
3	Virtus Segafredo Bologna	28	19	9	2397	2168	+229	Qualification to Playoffs
4	Umana Reyer Venezia	28	19	9	2257	2142	+115	Qualification to Playoffs
5	Banco di Sardegna Sassari	28	18	10	2527	2437	+90	Qualification to Playoffs
6	De' Longhi Treviso	28	14	14	2353	2468	−115	Qualification to Playoffs
7	Allianz Pallacanestro Trieste	28	14	14	2253	2249	+4	Qualification to Playoffs
8	Dolomiti Energia Trento	28	13	15	2191	2228	−37	Qualification to Playoffs
9	Germani Basket Brescia	28	11	17	2299	2389	−90	
10	Vanoli Cremona	28	11	17	2370	2395	−25	
11	UNAHOTELS Reggio Emilia	28	10	18	2122	2261	−139	
12	Fortitudo Lavoropiù Bologna	28	10	18	2179	2291	−112	
13	Carpegna Prosciutto Basket Pesaro	28	10	18	2271	2364	−93	
14	Openjobmetis Varese	28	10	18	2271	2433	−162	
15	Acqua S.Bernardo Cantù	28	9	19	2179	2313	−134	Relegation to Serie A2
16	Virtus Roma	0	0	0	0	0	0	Disqualified

Updated to match(es) played on 10 May 2021. Source: LBA

=== Positions by round ===
Team ╲ Round	1	2	3	4	5	6	7	8	9	10	11	12	13	14	15	16	17	18	19	20	21	22	23	24	25	26	27	28	29	30
AX Armani Exchange Milano	3	1	1	1	1	1	1	1	1	1	2	1	1	1	1	1	1	1	1	1	1	1	1	1	1	2	2	1	1	1
Happy Casa Brindisi	10	12	11	6	3	4	2	2	2	2	1	2	2	2	2	2	5	3	3	2	2	2	2	2	2	1	1	2	2	2
Virtus Segafredo Bologna	2	4	2	5	5	3	4	4	3	3	3	3	3	4	4	4	4	4	4	4	3	4	4	4	3	3	3	3	3	3
Umana Reyer Venezia	5	3	3	2	2	5	5	5	5	6	7	6	9	5	5	5	3	2	2	5	5	5	5	5	5	5	5	5	5	4
Banco di Sardegna Sassari	4	6	8	11	13	6	10	10	9	8	6	7	4	3	3	3	2	5	5	3	4	3	3	3	4	4	4	4	4	5
De'Longhi Treviso	7	9	14	13	8	12	7	6	8	7	8	10	6	8	9	7	10	7	9	9	7	7	7	6	6	6	6	6	6	6
Allianz Pallacanestro Trieste	1	2	4	3	6	10	8	8	6	9	11	9	11	6	7	6	7	6	7	8	6	6	6	7	7	7	8	7	7	7
Dolomiti Energia Trento	8	13	15	14	10	9	6	7	7	5	5	4	8	9	11	10	12	12	12	13	13	15	12	14	12	8	7	9	8	8
Germani Brescia	9	11	9	9	7	8	14	14	14	14	9	8	10	12	12	12	9	10	8	7	9	9	9	9	13	13	12	13	13	9
Vanoli Basket Cremona	14	15	13	4	11	14	11	11	11	11	12	12	12	11	10	9	13	13	13	10	10	10	11	13	10	10	9	8	9	10
UNAHOTELS Reggio Emilia	12	7	12	7	4	2	3	3	4	4	4	5	5	10	8	11	8	9	10	12	11	11	14	11	14	12	11	10	10	11
Fortitudo Lavoropiù Bologna	15	10	7	12	14	15	15	15	15	15	15	15	13	13	13	13	11	11	11	11	12	12	10	10	8	11	13	14	12	12
Carpegna Prosciutto Pesaro	11	14	10	15	15	11	12	12	10	10	10	11	7	7	6	8	6	8	6	6	8	8	8	8	11	9	10	11	11	13
Openjobmetis Varese	6	5	6	10	12	13	13	12	13	13	14	14	15	15	15	15	15	15	15	15	15	14	15	12	9	14	14	12	14	14
Acqua S.Bernardo Cantù	13	8	5	8	9	7	9	9	12	12	13	13	14	14	14	14	14	14	14	14	14	13	13	15	15	15	15	15	15	15

Leader
Qualification to playoffs
Relegation to serie A2

Updated to match(es) played on 10 May 2021. Source: LBA

=== Results ===
Home \ Away	CTU	TRI	AXM	SAS	PES	TVS	TRE	FBO	BRE	BRI	VAR	VEN	REG	CRE	VBO	~~ROM~~
Acqua S.Bernardo Cantù	—	73–67	71–89	106–101	81–72	83–76	75–76	67–80	89–92	71–93	97–82	67–75	71–72	82–85	82–91	~~101–85~~
Allianz Pallacanestro Trieste	82–79	—	65–87	82–103	101–88	84–79	92–82	88–82	78–81	76–79	108–83	69–87	78–69	102–77	60–77	canc.
AX Armani Exchange Milano	70–57	81–100	—	102–86	97–93	104–64	82–75	98–72	87–56	82–88	81–83	86–72	102–73	74–66	94–84	~~93–71~~
Banco di Sardegna Sassari	98–92	72–74	73–85	—	99–74	97–93	94–76	89–86	100–87	87–100	104–82	96–88	89–82	95–84	77–108	canc.
Carpegna Prosciutto Pesaro	107–83	84–74	81–88	85–95	—	89–97	57–71	70–78	98–88	62–86	85–78	65–78	84–63	95–83	70–75	canc.
De' Longhi Treviso	89–82	95–76	77–82	89–85	91–81	—	84–80	84–78	87–94	90–108	94–103	86–88	78–72	101–90	72–98	canc.
Dolomiti Energia Trento	74–73	81–69	61–60	92–78	70–81	76–82	—	64–78	91–67	83–73	74–77	90–84	81–87	85–83	85–92	canc.
Fortitudo Lavoropiù Bologna	75–68	69–82	71–82	79–89	77–79	87–98	93–70	—	88–78	70–95	83–88	76–72	71–68	85–71	71–91	canc.
Germani Basket Brescia	69–74	75–63	92–99	82–94	86–84	91–94	73–80	99–85	—	68–74	98–83	71–69	89–79	85–89	80–81	~~64–70~~
Happy Casa Brindisi	85–71	81–74	80–71	90–97	81–92	99–83	74–73	100–74	74–71	—	108–84	77–89	79–70	67–78	91–85	~~92–67~~
Openjobmetis Varese	80–90	73–79	70–96	89–74	81–68	79–80	88–70	67–79	94–89	76–74	—	75–77	76–89	110–105	73–85	~~98–88~~
Umana Reyer Venezia	80–75	81–66	69–63	99–92	72–90	82–62	71–79	92–76	94–87	75–67	86–77	—	95–75	88–84	68–83	canc.
UNAHOTELS Reggio Emilia	68–78	70–96	71–87	78–85	91–79	98–74	83–74	79–69	83–67	76–80	95–77	65–71	—	56–85	62–89	canc.
Vanoli Cremona	101–67	80–101	81–83	75–95	100–78	85–86	95–87	82–74	89–94	96–94	80–67	66–83	90–71	—	75–88	canc.
Virtus Segafredo Bologna	84–65	81–67	68–73	78–83	100–80	97–68	83–91	81–73	89–90	88–98	85–76	77–72	67–77	92–95	—	canc.
~~Virtus Roma~~	canc.	canc.	canc.	~~72–92~~	~~69–84~~	canc.	canc.	~~81–76~~	canc.	canc.	canc.	~~71–89~~	canc.	canc.	canc.	—

Updated to match(es) played on 10 May 2021. Source: LBA
Legend: Blue = home team win; Red = away team win.

=== Results by round ===
Round	1	2	3	4	5	6	7	8	9	10	11	12	13	14	15	16	17	18	19	20	21	22	23	24	25	26	27	28	29	30
AX Armani Exchange Milano	W	W	W	V	W	W	W	W	W	W	L	W	W	W	W	W	W	L	V	W	L	W	W	L	L	L	W	W	W	W
Happy Casa Brindisi	L	V	W	W	W	W	W	W	W	W	W	L	L	W	L	L	V	W	W	W	W	W	L	W	W	W	W	L	L	W
Virtus Segafredo Bologna	W	W	L	L	W	W	L	W	W	L	W	W	L	V	W	W	L	W	W	W	W	L	W	W	W	W	W	L	V	L
Umana Reyer Venezia	W	W	L	W	W	L	V	W	L	L	L	W	L	W	W	W	W	W	W	L	L	V	W	W	L	W	W	W	W	W
Banco di Sardegna Sassari	W	L	V	W	L	W	L	L	W	W	W	L	W	W	W	W	W	V	W	W	L	W	W	W	L	L	L	W	W	L
De' Longhi Treviso	W	L	L	L	W	L	W	W	L	W	L	L	W	L	V	W	L	W	L	L	W	W	W	W	W	W	L	L	L	V
Allianz Pallacanestro Trieste	W	W	L	L	L	L	W	L	W	V	L	W	L	W	W	W	L	W	L	L	W	W	L	L	V	L	L	W	W	W
Dolomiti Energia Trento	L	L	L	W	W	L	W	W	L	W	W	L	V	L	L	L	L	L	L	L	W	L	W	L	W	W	W	V	W	W
Germani Basket Brescia	L	L	W	W	L	V	L	L	L	W	W	W	L	L	L	W	W	L	W	W	V	L	L	L	L	L	L	L	W	W
Vanoli Cremona	L	L	W	W	L	L	W	L	L	W	V	L	W	W	L	L	L	L	L	W	W	L	L	L	W	V	W	W	L	L
UNAHOTELS Reggio Emilia	L	W	L	W	W	W	L	W	L	L	W	V	L	L	L	L	W	L	L	L	L	L	L	W	L	W	V	W	L	L
Fortitudo Lavoropiù Bologna	V	L	W	L	L	L	L	L	L	L	W	W	W	W	L	V	W	W	L	L	L	L	W	L	W	L	L	L	W	L
Carpegna Prosciutto Pesaro	L	L	W	L	V	W	W	L	W	L	L	W	W	L	W	L	W	L	W	V	L	L	L	L	L	W	L	L	L	L
Openjobmetis Varese	W	W	L	L	L	L	L	V	W	L	L	L	L	L	W	L	L	L	W	L	W	W	V	W	W	L	L	W	L	L
Acqua S.Bernardo Cantù	L	W	W	L	L	W	L	L	V	L	L	L	W	L	L	L	L	W	L	W	L	L	L	V	L	L	W	L	L	W
Virtus Roma (disqualified)	V	V	V	V	V	V	V	V	V	V	V	V	V	V	V	V	V	V	V	V	V	V	V	V	V	V	V	V	V	V

Updated to match(es) played on 10 May 2021. Source: LBA
W = Win; L = Loss; - = Postponed; V = Void

== Statistics ==
As of May 10, 2021

=== Individual statistics ===
==== Rating ====
Rank	Name	Team	Games	Rating	PIR
1.	(Croatia) Miro Bilan	Banco di Sardegna Sassari	28	639	22.8
2.	(United States) Zach LeDay	AX Armani Exchange Milano	25	512	20.5
3.	(United States) D'Angelo Harrison	Happy Casa Brindisi	19	384	20.2
4.	(United States) JaCorey Williams	Dolomiti Energia Trento	26	515	19.8
5.	(United States) Tyler Cain	Carpegna Prosciutto Pesaro	26	486	18.7

==== Points ====
Rank	Name	Team	Games	Points	PPG
1.	(United States) D'Angelo Harrison	Happy Casa Brindisi	19	354	18.6
2.	(United States) JaCorey Williams	Dolomiti Energia Trento	26	473	18.2
3.	(Argentina) Luis Scola	Openjobmetis Varese	28	499	17.8
4.	(Poland) David Logan	De' Longhi Treviso	27	468	17.3
5.	(Croatia) Miro Bilan	Banco di Sardegna Sassari	28	474	16.9

==== Rebounds ====
Rank	Name	Team	Games	Rebounds	RPG
1.	(United States) Tyler Cain	Carpegna Prosciutto Pesaro	26	235	9.0
2.	(United States) Jarvis Williams	Vanoli Cremona	27	224	8.3
3.	(United States) Derek Willis	Happy Casa Brindisi	25	202	8.1
4.	(Croatia) Miro Bilan	Banco di Sardegna Sassari	28	224	8.0
5.	(United States Virgin Islands) Frank Elegar	UNAHOTELS Reggio Emilia	24	190	7.9

==== Assists ====
Rank	Name	Team	Games	Assists	APG
1.	(Italy) Giuseppe Poeta	Vanoli Cremona	27	184	6.8
2.	(Serbia) Miloš Teodosić	Segafredo Virtus Bologna	27	182	6.7
3.	(United States) Darius Thompson	Happy Casa Brindisi	25	139	5.6
4.	(Puerto Rico) Gary Browne	Dolomiti Energia Trento	28	156	5.6
5.	(Spain) Sergio Rodríguez	AX Armani Exchange Milano	21	116	5.5

==== Other statistics ====
Category	Player	Team	Games	Totals	Average
Steals	(United States) Wesley Saunders	Fortitudo Lavoropiù Bologna	14	22	1.6
Blocks	(United States) Sha'markus Kennedy	Acqua S.Bernardo Cantù	20	35	1.8
Turnovers	(Italy) Marco Spissu	Banco di Sardegna Sassari	27	82	3.0
2P%	(United States) Julian Gamble	Segafredo Virtus Bologna	28	117/177	66.1%
3P%	(United States) Austin Daye	Umana Reyer Venezia	25	48/90	53.3%
FT%	(United States) Jaime Smith	Acqua S.Bernardo Cantù	21	79/84	94.1%

=== Individual game highs ===
Category	Player	Team	Statistic	Opponent
Points	(United States) Frank Gaines	Acqua S.Bernardo Cantù	43	vs Banco di Sardegna Sassari (May 10, 2021)
Rebounds	(United States) Tyler Cain	Carpegna Prosciutto Pesaro	19	vs Vanoli Cremona (Nov. 1, 2020)
Assists	(Serbia) Miloš Teodosić	Segafredo Virtus Bologna	14	@ Fortitudo Lavoropiù Bologna (Nov. 22, 2020)
Assists	(United States) Justin Robinson	Carpegna Prosciutto Pesaro	14	@ Banco di Sardegna Sassari (Jan. 17, 2021)
PIR	(United States) Frank Gaines	Acqua S.Bernardo Cantù	46	vs Banco di Sardegna Sassari (May 10, 2021)
Steals	(United States) T. J. Williams	Vanoli Cremona	8	@ Allianz Pallacanestro Trieste (Sept. 27, 2020)
Blocks	(United States) Sha'markus Kennedy	Acqua S.Bernardo Cantù	7	vs Allianz Pallacanestro Trieste (Nov. 1, 2020)
Three Pointers	(United States) Adrian Banks	Fortitudo Lavoropiù Bologna	9	vs Germani Basket Brescia (Apr. 3, 2021)

Source: RealGM

=== Team statistics ===
Category	Team	Average
Rating	Banco di Sardegna Sassari	105.1
Points	Banco di Sardegna Sassari	90.3
Points Allowed	AX Armani Exchange Milano	75.0
Rebounds	Happy Casa Brindisi	39.7
Assists	Virtus Segafredo Bologna	22.6
Steals	Dolomiti Energia Trento	8.5
Blocks	Fortitudo Lavoropiù Bologna	3.3
Turnovers^{1}	De' Longhi Treviso	11.1
FT %	Germani Basket Brescia	84.1%
2-Point %	Virtus Segafredo Bologna	58.2%
3-Point %	AX Armani Exchange Milano	42.3%

Notes

- ^1 The team with the least turnovers per game

== Awards ==
Title	Player	Team	Ref
Season MVP	(Italy) Stefano Tonut	Umana Reyer Venezia	
Finals MVP	(Serbia) Miloš Teodosić	Virtus Segafredo Bologna	
Best Italian	(Italy) Stefano Tonut	Umana Reyer Venezia	
Best Under 22	(Italy) Alessandro Pajola	Virtus Segafredo Bologna	
Best revelation	(United States) JaCorey Williams	Dolomiti Energia Trento	
Best defender	(United States) Kyle Hines	AX Armani Exchange Milano	
Best coach	(Italy) Francesco Vitucci	Happy Casa Brindisi	
Best executive	(Italy) Simone Giofrè	Happy Casa Brindisi	

All-Italian League Team
Pos.	Player	Team	Ref.
PG	(United States) Darius Thompson	Brindisi	
SG	(Italy) Stefano Tonut	Reyer Venezia	
SF	(Denmark) Shavon Shields	Olimpia Milano	
PF	(United States) Zach LeDay	Olimpia Milano	
C	(Croatia) Miro Bilan	Dinamo Sassari	

== Playoffs ==
The LBA playoffs quarterfinals and semifinals are best of five formats, while the finals series are best of seven format. The playoffs will start in May 2021, to finish in June 2021, depending on result.

Quarterfinals
AX Armani Exchange Milano	88	93	74
Dolomiti Energia Trento	62	79	65
Umana Reyer Venezia	92	83	60	73	93
Banco di Sardegna Sassari	91	78	75	86	91
Happy Casa Brindisi	85	86	79
Allianz Pallacanestro Trieste	64	54	77
Virtus Segafredo Bologna	91	88	105
De' Longhi Treviso	72	83	100

Semifinals
AX Armani Exchange Milano	81	99	93
Umana Reyer Venezia	79	65	83
Happy Casa Brindisi	66	74	75
Virtus Segafredo Bologna	73	83	78

Finals
AX Armani Exchange Milano	77	72	58	62
Virtus Segafredo Bologna	83	83	76	73

== Serie A clubs in European competitions ==
	Competition	Team	Progress	Result	Total W–L
Euroleague; Basketball					
Euroleague; Basketball	EuroLeague	AX Armani Exchange Milano	3rd place	vs (Russia) CSKA Moscow (W)	25–16
Euroleague; Basketball	EuroLeague	AX Armani Exchange Milano	Semifinal	vs (Spain) FC Barcelona (L)	25–16
Euroleague; Basketball	EuroLeague	AX Armani Exchange Milano	Playoffs	vs (Germany) Bayern Munich (3–2)	25–16
Euroleague; Basketball	EuroLeague	AX Armani Exchange Milano	Regular season	4th of 18 teams (21–13)	25–16
Euroleague; Basketball	EuroCup	Virtus Segafredo Bologna	Semifinals	vs (Russia) UNICS Kazan (1–2)	19–2
Euroleague; Basketball	EuroCup	Virtus Segafredo Bologna	Quarterfinals	vs (Spain) Joventut (2–0)	19–2
Euroleague; Basketball	EuroCup	Virtus Segafredo Bologna	Top 16	1st of 4 teams (6–0)	19–2
Euroleague; Basketball	EuroCup	Virtus Segafredo Bologna	Regular season	1st of 6 teams (10–0)	19–2
Euroleague; Basketball	EuroCup	Dolomiti Energia Trento	Top 16	3rd of 4 teams (3–3)	9–7
Euroleague; Basketball	EuroCup	Dolomiti Energia Trento	Regular season	3rd of 6 teams (6–4)	9–7
Euroleague; Basketball	EuroCup	Germani Brescia	Regular season	6th of 6 teams (2–8)	2–8
Euroleague; Basketball	EuroCup	Umana Reyer Venezia	Regular season	6th of 6 teams (2–8)	2–8
FIBA					
FIBA	Champions; League	Banco di Sardegna Sassari	Play-Offs	4th of 4 teams (1–5)	5–7
FIBA	Champions; League	Banco di Sardegna Sassari	Regular season	2nd of 4 teams (4–2)	5–7
FIBA	Champions; League	Happy Casa Brindisi	Play-Offs	3rd of 4 teams (3–3)	7–5
FIBA	Champions; League	Happy Casa Brindisi	Regular season	2nd of 4 teams (4–2)	7–5
FIBA	Champions; League	Fortitudo Lavoropiù Bologna	Regular season	4th of 4 teams (0–6)	0–6
FIBA	Europe Cup	UNAHOTELS Reggio Emilia	Quarterfinals	vs (Romania) CSM U Oradea (L)	3–2
FIBA	Europe Cup	UNAHOTELS Reggio Emilia	Round of 16	vs (Romania) Sibiu (W)	3–2
FIBA	Europe Cup	UNAHOTELS Reggio Emilia	Regular season	2nd of 4 teams (2–1)	3–2

== See also ==
- 2021 Italian Basketball Cup
- 2020 Italian Basketball Supercup
