= 2020–21 Virtus Roma season =

Italian basketball season

Virtus Roma
2020-21 season
- Owner: Claudio Toti
- President: Alessandro Toti
- Head coach: Piero Bucchi
- Arena: PalaLottomatica
- LBA: Disqualified
- Supercup: Group stage (4th of 4)

The 2020–21 season is Virtus Roma's 61st in existence and the club's 2nd consecutive season in the top tier Italian basketball.

== Overview ==
During the summer preseason period, the team faced financial uncertainty for the coming season, but at the end, on July 31, the president Toti decided to subscribe the team to the Lega Basket Serie A. Coach Piero Bucchi was confirmed and the team built in just less than a month.

Roma started the season without having a top sponsor and the lack of it brought more financial problems to deal with before the end of the year. In the month of December, Claudio Toti started looking for new owners whom to hand over the team, but no offer was officially made. Finally the decision to withdraw from the Serie A was taken on December 9 and the announcement was first given from the Italian Basketball Federation.

Until then Virtus Roma had played 9 games with 2 wins and was placed in the 15th place of the standing, out of 16. All the games were voided and the team was fined with 600.000 euros.

== Kit ==
Supplier: Macron

| Serie A Home | Serie A Away |

== Players ==
=== Current roster ===
Virtus Roma roster
Players
Coaches

| Pos. | No. | Nat. | Name | Ht. | Wt. | Age |
|---|---|---|---|---|---|---|
| PF | 0 | (Bosnia and Herzegovina) | Hadžić, Damir | 2.03 m (6 ft 8 in) | 103 kg (227 lb) | 29 – 13 May 1997 |
| F/C | 1 | (San Marino) | Biordi, Ygor | 2.04 m (6 ft 8 in) | 100 kg (220 lb) | 30 – 17 January 1996 |
| G | 9 | (United States) | Beane, Anthony | 1.88 m (6 ft 2 in) | 86 kg (190 lb) | 32 – 6 May 1994 |
| G | 12 | (Italy) | Campogrande, Luca | 1.98 m (6 ft 6 in) | 90 kg (198 lb) | 30 – 30 April 1996 |
| PG | 13 | (Italy) | Baldasso, Tommaso (C) | 1.91 m (6 ft 3 in) | 90 kg (198 lb) | 28 – 29 January 1998 |
| C | 14 | (Italy) | Cervi, Riccardo | 2.15 m (7 ft 1 in) | 115 kg (254 lb) | 35 – 19 June 1991 |
| G | 15 | (Italy) | Telesca, Samuele | 1.90 m (6 ft 3 in) | 78 kg (172 lb) | 23 – 1 February 2003 |
| C | 16 | (United States) | Hunt, Dario | 2.03 m (6 ft 8 in) | 104 kg (229 lb) | 37 – 2 May 1989 |
| PG | 22 | (United States) | Robinson, Gerald | 1.85 m (6 ft 1 in) | 77 kg (170 lb) | 37 – 10 February 1989 |
| PF | 23 | (United States) | Evans, Chris | 2.03 m (6 ft 8 in) | 100 kg (220 lb) | 35 – 29 January 1991 |
| G/F | 25 | (United States) | Farley, Liam | 1.96 m (6 ft 5 in) | 90 kg (198 lb) | 32 – 20 September 1994 |
| SF | 99 | (United States) | Wilson, Jamil | 2.01 m (6 ft 7 in) | 104 kg (229 lb) | 35 – 21 November 1990 |

Head coach

- (Italy) Piero Bucchi

Assistant coach(es)

- (Italy) Giuseppe Di Paolo
- (Italy) Andrea Bonacina

Legend

- (C) Team captain
- Injured

- Roster
Updated: 10 December 2020

Note: Flags indicate national team eligibility at FIBA-sanctioned events. Players may hold other non-FIBA nationalities not displayed.

=== Depth chart ===
| Pos. | Starting 5 | Bench 1 | Bench 2 |
|---|---|---|---|
| C | Dario Hunt | Riccardo Cervi | Ygor Biordi |
| PF | Chris Evans | Damir Hadžić |
| SF | Jamil Wilson | Liam Farley |
| SG | Anthony Beane | Luca Campogrande | Samuele Telesca |
| PG | Gerald Robinson | Tommaso Baldasso |

6+6 format (colours: Italian or homegrown players; foreign players; young players)

=== Squad changes ===
==== In ====
| No. | Pos. | Nat. | Name | Age | Moving from | | Type | Ends | Transfer fee | Date | Source |
|---|---|---|---|---|---|---|---|---|---|---|---|
| 12 | G/F | (Italy) | Luca Campogrande | 24 | New Basket Brindisi | (Italy) | 1 year | June 2021 | Free | 6 August 2020 | |
| 14 | C | (Italy) | Riccardo Cervi | 29 | Pallacanestro Trieste | (Italy) | 1 year | June 2021 | Free | 7 August 2020 | |
| 23 | PF | (United States) | Chris Evans | 29 | Orléans Loiret Basket | (France) | 1 year | June 2021 | Free | 10 August 2020 | |
| 22 | G | (United States) | Gerald Robinson | 31 | Bursaspor Basketbol | (Turkey) | 1 year | June 2021 | Free | 11 August 2020 | |
| 9 | G | (United States) | Anthony Beane | 26 | Spirou Charleroi | (Belgium) | 1 year | June 2021 | Free | 12 August 2020 | |
| 0 | PF | (Bosnia and Herzegovina) | Damir Hadžić | 23 | Flagler College | (United States) | 1 year | June 2021 | Free | 13 August 2020 | |
| 99 | SF | (United States) | Jamil Wilson | 29 | UNICS Kazan | (Russia) | 1 year | June 2021 | Free | 18 August 2020 | |
| 1 | F/C | (San Marino) (Italy) | Ygor Biordi | 24 | Gilbertina Soresina | (Italy) | 1 year | June 2021 | Free | 20 August 2020 | |
| 16 | C | (United States) | Dario Hunt | 31 | Mornar Bar | (Montenegro) | 1 year | June 2021 | Free | 25 August 2020 | |

==== Out ====
| No. | Pos. | Nat. | Name | Age | Moving to | | Type | Transfer fee | Date | Source |
|---|---|---|---|---|---|---|---|---|---|---|
| 7 | PF | (Bosnia and Herzegovina) (Italy) | Amar Alibegović | 25 | Virtus Bologna | (Italy) | End of contract | Free | 27 May 2020 | |
| 77 | SG | (Czech Republic) | Tomáš Kyzlink | 27 | Reggio Emilia | (Italy) | End of contract | Free | 26 June 2020 | |
| 0 | SG | (United States) | Jaylen Barford | 24 | Al Ittihad Alexandria | (Egypt) | End of contract | Free | 1 July 2020 | |
| 2 | F/C | (Italy) | Kevin Cusenza | 27 | Free agent | | End of contract | Free | 1 July 2020 | |
| 9 | G | (New Zealand) | Corey Webster | 31 | New Zealand Breakers | (New Zealand) | End of contract | Free | 1 July 2020 | |
| 10 | SG | (Italy) | Roberto Rullo | 30 | Free agent | | End of contract | Free | 1 July 2020 | |
| 22 | F/C | (Italy) | Giovanni Pini | 27 | Scaligera Verona | (Italy) | End of contract | Free | 1 July 2020 | |
| 34 | SG | (Italy) | Giovanni Spinosa | 22 | Free agent | | End of contract | Free | 1 July 2020 | |
| 41 | F/C | (United States) | Davon Jefferson | 33 | Maccabi Haifa | (Israel) | End of contract | Free | 1 July 2020 | |
| 44 | SG | (United States) | William Buford | 30 | Darüşşafaka | (Turkey) | End of contract | Free | 1 July 2020 | |

==== Confirmed ====
| No. | Pos. | Nat. | Name | Age | Moving from | | Type | Ends | Transfer fee | Date | Source |
|---|---|---|---|---|---|---|---|---|---|---|---|
| 13 | PG | (Italy) | Tommaso Baldasso | 22 | Auxilium Torino | (Italy) | 3 + 3 years | June 2022 | Free | 13 July 2016 | |
| 25 | G/F | (United States) | Liam Farley | 25 | Bowdoin | (United States) | 1 + 1 year | June 2021 | Free | 9 August 2019 | |

==== From youth team ====
| No. | Pos. | Nat. | Name | Age | Transfer fee | Date |
|---|---|---|---|---|---|---|
| 15 | G | (Italy) | Samuele Telesca | 17 | Youth system | 9 July 2020 |

==== Coach ====
| Nat. | Name | Age. | Previous team | | Type | Ends | Date | Source |
|---|---|---|---|---|---|---|---|---|
| (Italy) | Piero Bucchi | 61 | JuveCaserta | (Italy) | 2 + 1 years | June 2021 | 4 March 2018 | |

== Competitions ==
=== Supercup ===
| Pos | Team | Pld | W | L | PF | PA | PD | Qualification |
|---|---|---|---|---|---|---|---|---|
| 1 | Banco di Sardegna Sassari | 6 | 4 | 2 | 563 | 484 | +79 | Advance to Final Four |
| 2 | Happy Casa Brindisi | 6 | 4 | 2 | 528 | 470 | +58 | |
| 3 | Carpegna Prosciutto Pesaro | 6 | 4 | 2 | 498 | 435 | +63 | |
| 4 | Virtus Roma | 6 | 0 | 6 | 394 | 594 | −200 | |

Source: LegaBasket Serie A
Rules for classification: All points scored in extra period(s) were not counted in the standings, nor for any tie-break situation.

=== Serie A ===
This was the situation before the official ban from the competition:

| Pos | Team | Pld | W | L | PF | PA | PD |
|---|---|---|---|---|---|---|---|
| 12 | Acqua S.Bernardo Cantù | 9 | 3 | 6 | 695 | 760 | −65 |
| 13 | Germani Basket Brescia | 10 | 3 | 7 | 768 | 804 | −36 |
| 14 | Allianz Pallacanestro Trieste | 5 | 2 | 3 | 380 | 390 | −10 |
| 15 | Virtus Roma | 9 | 2 | 7 | 674 | 789 | −115 |
| 16 | Fortitudo Lavoropiù Bologna | 9 | 1 | 8 | 726 | 798 | −72 |

Updated to match(es) played on 9 December 2020. Source:

== See also ==
- 2020–21 LBA season
- 2020 Italian Basketball Supercup
