= 2020–21 Pallacanestro Varese season =

Italian basketball season

Pallacanestro Varese
2020-21 season
- Owner: Varese nel cuore s.c. a r.l.
- President: Marco Vittorelli
- Head coach: Massimo Bulleri
- Arena: Palasport Lino Oldrini
- LBA: 14th of 15
- Supercup: Group stage (3rd of 4)

The 2020–21 season is Pallacanestro Varese's 76th in existence and the club's 12th consecutive season in the top tier Italian basketball.

== Kit ==
Supplier: Macron / Sponsor: Openjobmetis

| Away | Home |

== Players ==
=== Current roster ===
Openjobmetis Varese roster
Players
Coaches

| Pos. | No. | Nat. | Name | Ht. | | Age |
|---|---|---|---|---|---|---|
| G | 2 | (United States) | Beane, Anthony | 1.88 m (6 ft 2 in) | 86 kg (190 lb) | 32 – 6 May 1994 |
| C | 3 | (United States) | Morse, Anthony | 2.03 m (6 ft 8 in) | 103 kg (227 lb) | 32 – 13 April 1994 |
| F/C | 4 | (Argentina) | Scola, Luis | 2.06 m (6 ft 9 in) | 109 kg (240 lb) | 46 – 30 April 1980 |
| PG | 5 | (Italy) | De Nicolao, Giovanni | 1.91 m (6 ft 3 in) | 79 kg (174 lb) | 30 – 10 June 1996 |
| PG | 10 | (Italy) | Ruzzier, Michele | 1.83 m (6 ft 0 in) | 80 kg (176 lb) | 33 – 9 February 1993 |
| G/F | 12 | (Latvia) | Strautiņš, Artūrs | 1.98 m (6 ft 6 in) | 100 kg (220 lb) | 27 – 23 October 1998 |
| C | 15 | (United States) | Egbunu, John | 2.08 m (6 ft 10 in) | 111 kg (245 lb) | 31 – 31 October 1994 |
| SF | 19 | (Italy) | De Vico, Niccolò | 2.00 m (6 ft 7 in) | 93 kg (205 lb) | 32 – 19 July 1994 |
| F | 21 | (Italy) | Ferrero, Giancarlo (C) | 1.98 m (6 ft 6 in) | 97 kg (214 lb) | 38 – 29 August 1988 |
| PG | 23 | (United States) | Douglas, Toney | 1.88 m (6 ft 2 in) | 86 kg (190 lb) | 40 – 16 March 1986 |

Head coach

- (Italy) Massimo Bulleri

Assistant coach(es)

- (Italy) Vincenzo Cavazzana
- (Italy) Alberto Seravalli

Legend

- (C) Team captain
- Injured

- Roster
Updated: 10 May 2021

Note: Flags indicate national team eligibility at FIBA-sanctioned events. Players may hold other non-FIBA nationalities not displayed.

=== Depth chart ===
| Pos. | Starting 5 | Bench |
|---|---|---|
| C | Anthony Morse | John Egbunu |
| PF | Luis Scola | Giancarlo Ferrero |
| SF | Artūrs Strautiņš | Niccolò De Vico |
| SG | Toney Douglas | Anthony Beane |
| PG | Michele Ruzzier | Giovanni De Nicolao |

5+5 format (colours: Italian or homegrown players; foreign players; young players)

=== Squad changes ===
==== In ====
| No. | Pos. | Nat. | Name | Age | Moving from | | Type | Ends | Transfer fee | Date | Source |
|---|---|---|---|---|---|---|---|---|---|---|---|
| 5 | PG | (Italy) | Giovanni De Nicolao | 24 | Fortitudo Agrigento | (Italy) | 2 years | June 2022 | Free | 12 June 2020 | |
| 12 | G/F | (Latvia) | Artūrs Strautiņš | 21 | Pallalcesto Amatori Udine | (Italy) | 2 + 1 years | June 2022 + 2023 | Free | 16 June 2020 | |
| 19 | SF | (Italy) | Niccolò De Vico | 22 | Vanoli Cremona | (Italy) | 2 years | June 2022 | Free | 23 June 2020 | |
| 10 | PG | (Italy) | Michele Ruzzier | 22 | Vanoli Cremona | (Italy) | 1 + 1 years | June 2021 + 2022 | Undisclosed | 25 June 2020 | |
| 11 | PF | (Sweden) | Denzel Andersson | 23 | BC Luleå | (Sweden) | 1 + 1 years | June 2021 + 2022 | Free | 27 June 2020 | |
| 4 | F/C | (Argentina) | Luis Scola | 40 | Olimpia Milano | (Italy) | 1 + 1 years | June 2021 + 2022 | Free | 1 July 2020 | |
| 3 | C | (United States) | Anthony Morse | 26 | Andrea Costa Imola | (Italy) | 1 years | June 2021 | Free | 8 July 2020 | |
| 22 | SF | (United States) | Jalen Jones | 27 | Capital City Go-Go | (United States) | 1 years | June 2021 | Undisclosed | 9 November 2020 | |
| 2 | G | (United States) | Anthony Beane | 26 | Virtus Roma | (Italy) | 1+1 years | June 2021 + 2022 | Free | 14 December 2020 | |
| 15 | C | (United States) | John Egbunu | 26 | Busan KT Sonicboom | (South Korea) | End of the season | June 2021 | Free | 28 January 2021 | |

1. In players: Players who signed after the beginning of the season

==== Out ====
| No. | Pos. | Nat. | Name | Age | Moving to | | Type | Transfer fee | Date | Source |
|---|---|---|---|---|---|---|---|---|---|---|
| 9 | PF | (Estonia) | Siim-Sander Vene | 29 | Baloncesto Fuenlabrada | (Spain) | End of contract | Free | 26 May 2020 | |
| 8 | F | (Italy) | Nicola Natali | 31 | Pallacanestro Forlì | (Italy) | End of contract | Free | 8 June 2020 | |
| 14 | PG | (United States) | Josh Mayo | 32 | Napoli Basket | (Italy) | Mutual consent | Undisclosed | 21 June 2020 | |
| 1 | G/F | (United States) | Justin Carter | 33 | Zadar | (Croatia) | End of contract | Free | 1 July 2020 | |
| 6 | SF | (Italy) | Gianmarco De Vita | 22 | Pallacnestro Castronno | (Italy) | End of contract | Free | 1 July 2020 | |
| 11 | C | (United States) | Jeremy Simmons | 30 | Tofaş Bursa | (Turkey) | End of contract | Free | 1 July 2020 | |
| 15 | PG | (Italy) | Matteo Tambone | 26 | VL Pesaro | (Italy) | End of contract | Free | 1 July 2020 | |
| 18 | C | (Italy) | Luca Gandini | 34 | Dinamo Sassari | (Italy) | End of contract | Free | 1 July 2020 | |
| 12 | SG | (Italy) | Omar Seck | 19 | Oleggio Magic Basket | (Italy) | Loan contract | Undisclosed | 17 July 2020 | |
| 22 | SF | (United States) | Jalen Jones | 27 | Free agent | | Mutual consent | Undisclosed | 8 January 2021 | |
| 11 | PF | (Sweden) | Denzel Andersson | 24 | BC Luleå | (Sweden) | Mutual consent | Free | 27 June 2020 | |
| 7 | PG | (Latvia) | Ingus Jakovičs | 27 | Budivelnyk Kiyv | (Ukraine) | Transfer | Undisclosed | 24 February 2021 | |

1. Out players: Players who left before the end of the season

==== Confirmed ====
| No. | Pos. | Nat. | Name | Age | Moving from | | Type | Ends | Transfer fee | Date | Source |
|---|---|---|---|---|---|---|---|---|---|---|---|
| 21 | F | (Italy) | Giancarlo Ferrero | 31 | Pallacanestro Trapani | (Italy) | 4 + 2 + 1 years | 2021 + 2022 | Free | 4 July 2015 | |
| 7 | PG | (Latvia) | Ingus Jakovičs | 27 | Ventspils | (Italy) | 1 + 1+1 year | June 2021 + 2022 | Free | 30 August 2019 | |
| 23 | PG | (United States) | Toney Douglas | 34 | Estudiantes | (Spain) | 1 + 1 | June 2021 | Free | 2 March 2020 | |

==== Coach ====
| Nat. | Name | Age. | Previous team | | Type | Ends | Date | Replaces | | Date | Type |
|---|---|---|---|---|---|---|---|---|---|---|---|
| (Italy) | Massimo Bulleri | 42 | Basket Ravenna | (Italy) | 1+1 years | June 2021 | 8 September 2020 | (Italy) | Attilio Caja | 5 September 2020 | Sacked |
| (Italy) | Attilio Caja | 59 | Virtus Roma | (Italy) | 3 + 3 years | June 2022 | 23 December 2016 | | | | |

==== Unsuccessful deals ====
The following deal never activated and the player's contract was withdrawn before the beginning of the season.

| Signing date | Withdrawal date | Pos. | Nat. | Name | Age | Moving from | | Type | Moved to |
|---|---|---|---|---|---|---|---|---|---|
| 29 June 2020 | 9 July 2020 | G | (United States) | Jason Rich | 34 | Gaziantep Basketbol | (Turkey) | 1 year | Free agent |

== Competitions ==
=== Supercup ===
| Pos | Team | Pld | W | L | PF | PA | PD | Qualification |
|---|---|---|---|---|---|---|---|---|
| 1 | AX Armani Exchange Milano | 6 | 6 | 0 | 576 | 433 | +143 | Advance to Final Four |
| 2 | Germani Basket Brescia | 6 | 3 | 3 | 499 | 515 | −16 | |
| 3 | Openjobmetis Varese | 6 | 2 | 4 | 500 | 548 | −48 | |
| 4 | S.Bernardo Cantù | 6 | 1 | 5 | 444 | 523 | −79 | |

Source: LegaBasket Serie A
Rules for classification: All points scored in extra period(s) were not counted in the standings, nor for any tie-break situation.

=== Serie A ===
| Pos | Team | Pld | W | L | PF | PA | PD | Qualification |
|---|---|---|---|---|---|---|---|---|
| 12 | Fortitudo Lavoropiù Bologna | 28 | 10 | 18 | 2179 | 2291 | −112 | |
| 13 | Carpegna Prosciutto Basket Pesaro | 28 | 10 | 18 | 2271 | 2364 | −93 | |
| 14 | Openjobmetis Varese | 28 | 10 | 18 | 2271 | 2433 | −162 | |
| 15 | Acqua S.Bernardo Cantù | 28 | 9 | 19 | 2179 | 2313 | −134 | Relegation to Serie A2 |
| 16 | Virtus Roma | 0 | 0 | 0 | 0 | 0 | 0 | Disqualified |

Updated to match(es) played on 10 May 2021. Source: LBA

== See also ==
- 2020–21 LBA season
- 2020 Italian Basketball Supercup
