= 2020–21 Universo Treviso Basket season =

Italian basketball season

Universo Treviso Basket
2020-21 season
- Owner: Consorzio Universo Treviso
- President: Paolo Vazzoler
- Head coach: Massimiliano Menetti
- Arena: Palaverde
- LBA: 6th of 15
- Playoffs: Quarterfinals
- Supercup: Group stage (2nd of 4)

The 2020–21 season is Universo Treviso Basket's 9th in existence (6th after the re-foundation) and the club's 2nd consecutive season in the top tier Italian basketball.

== Kit ==
Supplier: Erreà / Sponsor: De'Longhi

Home	Away

== Players ==
=== Current roster ===
De'Longhi Treviso roster
Players
Coaches

Pos.	No.	Nat.	Name	Ht.	Wt.	Age
SG	1	(Poland)	Logan, David	1.85 m (6 ft 1 in)	77 kg (170 lb)	43 – 26 December 1982
PG	4	(United States)	Russell, DeWayne	1.80 m (5 ft 11 in)	70 kg (154 lb)	32 – 10 February 1994
F/C	8	(Italy)	Vildera, Giovanni	2.05 m (6 ft 9 in)	105 kg (231 lb)	31 – 4 March 1995
F	9	(Italy)	Bartoli, Vittorio	2.01 m (6 ft 7 in)	99 kg (218 lb)	24 – 11 June 2002
PG	12	(Italy)	Imbrò, Matteo (C)	1.92 m (6 ft 4 in)	86 kg (190 lb)	32 – 12 February 1994
PG	13	(Italy)	Piccin, Lorenzo	1.91 m (6 ft 3 in)	80 kg (176 lb)	23 – 18 November 2002
F/C	15	(Italy)	Chillo, Matteo	2.03 m (6 ft 8 in)	104 kg (229 lb)	33 – 15 June 1993
C	21	(Nigeria)	Mekowulu, Christian	2.05 m (6 ft 9 in)	110 kg (243 lb)	31 – 17 March 1995
SF	24	(Poland)	Sokołowski, Michał	1.96 m (6 ft 5 in)	89 kg (196 lb)	33 – 11 December 1992
F	45	(Italy)	Akele, Nicola	2.03 m (6 ft 8 in)	98 kg (216 lb)	28 – 7 November 1997
G/F	52	(United States)	Lockett, Trent	1.96 m (6 ft 5 in)	95 kg (209 lb)	35 – 10 December 1990

Head coach

- (Italy) Massimiliano Menetti

Assistant coach(es)

- (Italy) Francesco Tabellini
- (Italy) Lorenzo Pomes

Legend

- (C) Team captain
- Injured

- Roster
Updated: 17 May 2021

Note: Flags indicate national team eligibility at FIBA-sanctioned events. Players may hold other non-FIBA nationalities not displayed.

=== Depth chart ===
Pos.	Starting 5	Bench 1	Bench 2
C	Christian Mekowulu	Giovanni Vildera
PF	Nicola Akele	Matteo Chillo
SF	Michał Sokołowski	Trent Lockett	Vittorio Bartoli
SG	David Logan	Lorenzo Piccin
PG	DeWayne Russell	Matteo Imbrò

5+5 format (colours: Italian or homegrown players; foreign players; young players)

1. Piccin was offered a professional contract at the end of January 2021

=== Squad changes ===
==== In ====
No.	Pos.	Nat.	Name	Age	Moving from		Type	Ends	Transfer fee	Date	Source
30	SF	(United States)	Jeffrey Carroll	25	Bergamo Basket	(Italy)	1 year	June 2021	Free	22 May 2020	
8	F/C	(Italy)	Giovanni Vildera	25	Rieti	(Italy)	1 year	June 2021	Free	18 June 2020	
21	C	(Nigeria)	Christian Mekowulu	25	Pallacanestro Orzinuovi	(Italy)	1 year	June 2021	Free	20 June 2020	
45	PF	(Italy)	Nicola Akele	24	Vanoli Cremona	(Italy)	1 year	June 2021	Undisclosed	26 June 2020	
4	PG	(United States)	DeWayne Russell	26	Crailsheim Merlins	(Germany)	1 year	June 2021	Free	30 June 2020	
4	SG	(United States)	Tyler Cheese	23	Akron Zips	(United States)	1 year	June 2021	Free	8 July 2020	
24	SF	(Poland)	Michał Sokołowski	27	Legia Warszawa	(Poland)	1 year	June 2021	Undisclosed	16 October 2020	
52	G/F	(United States)	Trent Lockett	30	Hapoel Jerusalem	(Israel)	End of the season	June 2021	Free	29 January 2021	

1. In players: Players who signed after the beginning of the season

==== Out ====
No.	Pos.	Nat.	Name	Age	Moving to		Type	Transfer fee	Date	Source
6	SF	(Cape Verde) (Portugal)	Ivan Almeida	31	Ironi Nahariya	(Israel)	End of contract	Free	26 May 2020	
0	C	(Italy)	Amedeo Tessitori	25	Virtus Bologna	(Italy)	End of contract	Free	5 June 2020	
11	F	(United States)	Jordan Parks	26	Napoli Basket	(Italy)	End of contract	Free	27 June 2020	
4	PF	(Italy)	Davide Alviti	23	Pallacanestro Trieste	(Italy)	End of contract	Free	1 July 2020	
5	PG	(Slovenia)	Aleksej Nikolić	25	Partizan Belgrade	(Serbia)	Return from loan	Free	1 July 2020	
16	SG	(Italy)	Lorenzo Uglietti	26	Napoli Basket	(Italy)	End of contract	Free	1 July 2020	
20	F/C	(Italy)	Luca Severini	24	Derthona Basket	(Italy)	End of contract	Free	1 July 2020	
24	PF	(New Zealand)	Isaac Fotu	26	Reyer Venezia	(Italy)	End of contract	Free	1 July 2020	
	PG	(Italy)	Manuel Saladini	18	Benedetto XIV Cento	(Italy)	End of contract	Free	1 July 2020	
4	SG	(United States)	Tyler Cheese	23	Vilpas Vikings	(Finland)	Mutual consent	Free	26 October 2020	
30	SF	(United States)	Jeffrey Carroll	26	Pallacanestro Biella	(Italy)	Transfer	Undisclosed	25 January 2021	

1. Out players: Players who left before the end of the season

==== Confirmed ====
No.	Pos.	Nat.	Name	Age	Moving from		Type	Ends	Transfer fee	Date	Source
12	PG	(Italy)	Matteo Imbrò	26	Basket Ferentino	(Italy)	2 + 2 years	2021	Free	30 June 2017	
15	F/C	(Italy)	Matteo Chillo	27	Fortitudo Bologna	(Italy)	2 + 1 years	2021	Free	30 July 2018	
1	SG	(Poland) (United States)	David Logan	37	Busan KT Sonicboom	(South Korea)	5 months + 2 years	2021	Free	9 February 2019	

==== From youth team ====
No.	Pos.	Nat.	Name	Age	Transfer fee	Date
9	F	(Italy)	Vittorio Bartoli	18	Youth system	September 2020
13	PG	(Italy)	Lorenzo Piccin	17	Youth system	September 2020

==== Coach ====
Nat.	Name	Age.	Previous team		Type	Ends	Date	Source
(Italy)	Massimiliano Menetti	47	Reggio Emilia	(Italy)	3 + 3 years	June 2023	7 June 2018	

== Competitions ==
=== Supercup ===
Pos	Team	Pld	W	L	PF	PA	PD	Qualification
1	Umana Reyer Venezia	6	4	2	462	434	+28	Advance to Final Four
2	De' Longhi Treviso	6	3	3	475	459	+16	
3	Allianz Pallacanestro Trieste	6	3	3	428	467	−39	
4	Dolomiti Energia Trento	6	2	4	467	472	−5	

Source: LegaBasket Serie A
Rules for classification: All points scored in extra period(s) were not counted in the standings, nor for any tie-break situation.

=== Serie A ===
==== Regular season ====
Pos	Team	Pld	W	L	PF	PA	PD	Qualification
4	Umana Reyer Venezia	28	19	9	2257	2142	+115	Qualification to Playoffs
5	Banco di Sardegna Sassari	28	18	10	2527	2437	+90	Qualification to Playoffs
6	De' Longhi Treviso	28	14	14	2353	2468	−115	Qualification to Playoffs
7	Allianz Pallacanestro Trieste	28	14	14	2253	2249	+4	Qualification to Playoffs
8	Dolomiti Energia Trento	28	13	15	2191	2228	−37	Qualification to Playoffs

Updated to match(es) played on 10 May 2021. Source: LBA

==== Playoffs ====
===== Quarterfinals =====
13 May 2021 Game 1	Segafredo Virtus Bologna	91–72 (Series: 1-0)	De' Longhi Treviso	Bologna
19:00 (CET)	Scoring by quarter: 27-17, 21-26, 24-18, 19-11
Eurosport 2, Eurosport Player	Pts: Gamble 17; Rebs: Ricci 8 Asts: Teodosić 9 PIR: Gamble 24	Boxscore	Pts: Logan 17; Rebs: Mekowulu 8 Asts: Sokołowski 4 PIR: Mekowulu 19	Arena: Segafredo Arena; Referees: Tolga Sahin, Mark Bartoli, Alessandro Nicolini

14 May 2021 Game 2	Segafredo Virtus Bologna	88–83 (Series: 2-0)	De' Longhi Treviso	Bologna
20:45 (CET)	Scoring by quarter: 16-18, 25-15, 22-21, 25-29
Rai Sport, Eurosport Player	Pts: Belinelli 24; Rebs: Hunter 12; Asts: Teodosić 8 PIR: Teodosić 26	Boxscore	Pts: Mekowulu 23; Rebs: Sokołowski 8 Asts: Sokołowski 7 PIR: Mekowulu 35	Arena: Segafredo Arena; Referees: Manuel Mazzoni, Guido Giovannetti, Giulio Pepponi

17 May 2021 Game 3	De' Longhi Treviso	100–105(OT) (Series: 0-3)	Segafredo Virtus Bologna	Villorba (Treviso)
20:45 (CET)	Scoring by quarter: 25-24, 36-22, 9-22, 23-25, Overtime: 7-12
Rai Sport, Eurosport Player	Pts: Logan 25; Rebs: Mekowulu 7 Asts: Logan, Russell 6 PIR: Logan 29	Boxscore	Pts: Pajola 25; Rebs: Ricci 9 Asts: Pajola, Teodosić 7 PIR: Pajola 29	Arena: Palaverde; Referees: Roberto Begnis, Denny Borgioni, Denis Quarta

== See also ==
- 2020–21 LBA season
- 2020 Italian Basketball Supercup
