= 2019–20 Vanoli Cremona season =

Vanoli Cremona
2019-20 season
- President: Aldo Vanoli
- Head coach: Romeo Sacchetti
- Arena: Palasport Mario Radi
- LBA: season cancelled (6th)
- Coppa Italia: Quarter finals
- Supercoppa: Semifinalist

The 2019–20 season is Vanoli Cremona's 21st in existence and the club's 11th consecutive season in the top flight of Italian basketball.

== Overview ==
The 2019-20 season was hit by the coronavirus pandemic that compelled the federation to suspend and later cancel the competition without assigning the title to anyone. Cremona ended the championship in 6th position.

== Kit ==
Supplier: Errea / Sponsor: Vanoli

Home	Away	Third

== Players ==
=== Current roster ===
Vanoli Cremona roster
Players
Coaches

Pos.	No.	Nat.	Name	Ht.	Wt.	Age
SG	1	(United States)	Saunders, Wesley	1.96 m (6 ft 5 in)	88 kg (194 lb)	33 – 16 June 1993
SG	2	(United States)	Mathews, Jordan	1.91 m (6 ft 3 in)	93 kg (205 lb)	32 – 22 June 1994
PG	5	(Italy)	Sanguinetti, Giacomo	1.81 m (5 ft 11 in)	84 kg (185 lb)	36 – 21 March 1990
PG	7	(Italy)	Diener, Travis (C)	1.85 m (6 ft 1 in)	79 kg (174 lb)	44 – 1 March 1982
PG	10	(Italy)	Ruzzier, Michele	1.83 m (6 ft 0 in)	82 kg (181 lb)	33 – 9 February 1993
C	13	(Croatia)	Sobin, Josip	2.04 m (6 ft 8 in)	105 kg (231 lb)	37 – 31 August 1989
G/F	21	(Italy)	De Vico, Niccolò	2.00 m (6 ft 7 in)	93 kg (205 lb)	32 – 19 July 1994
F/C	22	(United States)	Happ, Ethan	2.08 m (6 ft 10 in)	108 kg (238 lb)	30 – 7 May 1996
G/F	23	(Serbia)	Stojanović, Vojislav	1.99 m (6 ft 6 in)	98 kg (216 lb)	29 – 14 April 1997
SG	31	(Finland)	Palmi, Topias	1.96 m (6 ft 5 in)	91 kg (201 lb)	32 – 26 August 1994
F	45	(Italy)	Akele, Nicola	2.03 m (6 ft 8 in)	98 kg (216 lb)	28 – 7 November 1997

Head coach

- (Italy) Romeo Sacchetti

Assistant coach(es)

- (Italy) Flavio Fioretti
- (Italy) Simone Bianchi

Legend

- (C) Team captain
- Injured

- Roster
Updated: February 9, 2020

Note: Flags indicate national team eligibility at FIBA-sanctioned events. Players may hold other non-FIBA nationalities not displayed.

=== Depth chart ===
Pos.	Starting 5	Bench 1	Bench 2
C	Josip Sobin
PF	Ethan Happ	Vojislav Stojanović	Nicola Akele
SF	Jordan Mathews	Niccolò De Vico
SG	Wesley Saunders	Topias Palmi
PG	Travis Diener	Michele Ruzzier	Giacomo Sanguinetti

6+6 format (colours: Italian or homegrown players; foreign players; young players)

=== Squad changes ===
==== In ====
No.	Pos.	Nat.	Name	Age	Moving from		Type	Ends	Transfer fee	Date	Source
45	F	(Italy)	Nicola Akele	21	Roseto Sharks	(Italy)	3 years	June 2022	Free	11 June 2019	
31	SG	(Finland)	Topias Palmi	24	Kataja	(Finland)	3 years	June 2022	Free	27 June 2019	
21	G/F	(Italy)	Niccolò De Vico	24	Reggio Emilia	(Italy)	3 years	June 2022	Free	10 July 2019	
2	SG	(United States)	Jordan Mathews	25	Team FOG Næstved	(Denmark)	1 years	June 2020	Free	18 July 2019	
22	F/C	(United States)	Matt Tiby	20	Büyükçekmece	(Turkey)	1 years	June 2020	Free	24 July 2019	
13	C	(Croatia)	Josip Sobin	30	Anwil Włocławek	(Poland)	1 year	June 2020	Free	19 September 2019	
22	F/C	(United States)	Ethan Happ	23	Olympiacos	(Greece)	2 years loan	June 2021	Free	7 November 2019	
15	G/F	(United States)	Malachi Richardson	23	Hapoel Holon	(Israel)	1 year	June 2020	Undisclosed	16 December 2019	

==== Out ====
No.	Pos.	Nat.	Name	Age	Moving to		Type	Transfer fee	Date	Source
8	PF	(Italy)	Giampaolo Ricci	27	Virtus Bologna	(Italy)	end of contract	Free	1 July 2019	
12	C	(Australia) (Sudan)	Mangok Mathiang	26	Bahçeşehir	(Turkey)	end of contract	Free	1 July 2019	
16	SF	(Italy)	Dario Boccasavia	20	Juvi Cremona	(Italy)	end of contract	Free	1 July 2019	
22	SF	(United States)	Drew Crawford	28	Gaziantep	(Turkey)	end of contract	Free	1 July 2019	
23	PF	(United States)	Peyton Aldridge	23	Afyon Belediye	(Turkey)	end of contract	Free	1 July 2019	
22	F/C	(United States)	Matt Tiby	20	Gießen 46ers	(Germany)	mutual consent	Undisclosed	7 November 2019	
6	PF	(Italy)	Giulio Gazzotti	28	Amici Udinese	(Italy)	mutual consent	Undisclosed	4 December 2019	
15	G/F	(United States)	Malachi Richardson	24	free agent		mutual consent	Undisclosed	11 January 2020	

==== Confirmed ====
No.	Pos.	Nat.	Name	Age	Moving from		Type	Ends	Transfer fee	Date	Source
10	PG	(Italy)	Michele Ruzzier	26	Fortitudo Bologna	(Italy)	2 + 2 years	June 2021	Free	5 July 2017	
6	PF	(Italy)	Giulio Gazzotti	28	V.L. Pesaro	(Italy)	2 + 1 years	June 2020	Free	23 July 2017	
7	PG	(Italy) (United States)	Travis Diener	37	Dinamo Sassari	(Italy)	1 + 1 + 1 years	June 2020	Free	25 July 2017	
1	SG	(United States)	Wesley Saunders	26	Kataja	(Finland)	1 + 1 years	June 2020	Free	26 July 2018	
23	G/F	(Serbia)	Vojislav Stojanović	22	Auxilium Torino	(Italy)	3 years	June 2021	Free	26 November 2018	
5	PG	(Italy)	Giacomo Sanguinetti	29	Mens Sana Siena	(Italy)	1 years	June 2020	Free	26 March 2019	

==== Coach ====
Nat.	Name	Age.	Previous team		Type	Ends	Date	Source
(Italy)	Romeo Sacchetti	66	New Basket Brindisi	(Italy)	3 + 3 years	2022	15 June 2017	

==== Unsuccessful deals ====
The following deal never activated and the player's contract was withdrawn before the beginning of the season.

Signing date	Withdrawal date	Pos.	Nat.	Name	Age	Moving from		Type	Moved to	
15 July 2019	24 September 2019	F/C	(United States)	Darrell Williams	30	Le Portel	(France)	1 year	İTÜ B.K.	(Turkey)

== Competitions ==
=== SuperCup ===
Cremona took part in the 25th edition of the Italian Basketball Supercup as the 2019 Italian Basketball Cup winner. They lost the competition at the semifinal, after one overtime against Banco di Sardegna Sassari.

21 September 2019 Semifinals	Vanoli Cremona	94–101(OT)	Banco di Sardegna Sassari	Bari
18:00 (CEST)	Scoring by quarter: 21–16, 28–30, 20–20, 18–21, Overtime: 7–14
Eurosport	Pts: Matthew Tiby 25; Rebs: Saunders 6 Asts: Diener 5 PIR: Matthew Tiby, Diener 20	Boxscore	Pts: Evans 18; Rebs: McLean, Evans 9 Asts: Spissu 7 PIR: Evans, Spissu 25	Arena: PalaFlorio

=== Serie A ===
Pos	Team	Pld	W	L	PF	PA	PD	Qualification or relegation
4	AX Armani Exchange Milano	21	14	7	1687	1555	+132	Already qualified for EuroLeague
5	Happy Casa Brindisi	21	13	8	1776	1696	+80	Qualification for Champions League
6	Vanoli Cremona	20	12	8	1627	1617	+10	
7	Umana Reyer Venezia	21	11	10	1638	1582	+56	Qualification for EuroCup
8	Pompea Fortitudo Bologna	21	11	10	1624	1670	−46	Qualification for Champions League

Updated to match(es) played on 9 February 2020. Source: LBA

=== Italian Cup ===
Cremona qualified to the 2020 Italian Basketball Cup having ended the first half of the season in 5th place. They lost the first match in the quarter finals against AX Armani Exchange Milano.

13 February 2020 Quarter finals	AX Armani Exchange Milano	86–62	Vanoli Cremona	Pesaro
18:00	Scoring by quarter: 28–12, 16–19, 16–20, 26–11
Eurosport, Rai Sport		[ Boxscore]		Arena: Adriatic Arena
