= Jeffrey Carroll (basketball) =

American basketball player (born 1994)

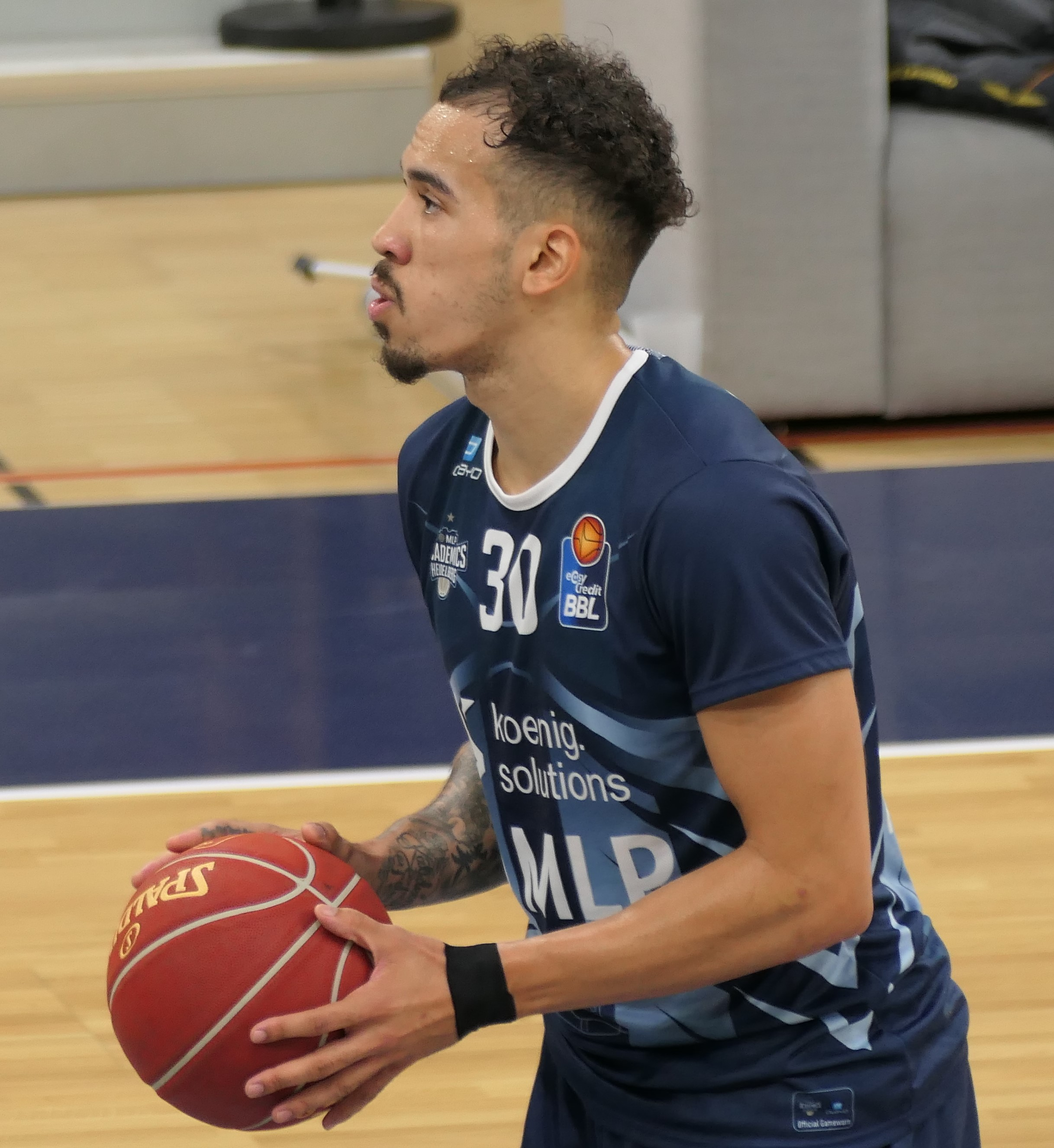
- Carroll playing for Heidelberg in 2023

Denain Voltaire Basket
- Position: Small forward
- League: LNB Élite

Personal information
- Born: November 6, 1994 (age 32) Alexandria, Virginia, U.S.
- Listed height: 6 ft 6 in (1.98 m)
- Listed weight: 218 lb (99 kg)

Career information
- High school: Rowlett (Rowlett, Texas)
- College: Oklahoma State (2014–2018)
- NBA draft: 2018: undrafted
- Playing career: 2018–present

Career history
- 2018–2019: South Bay Lakers
- 2019–2020: Bergamo Basket 2014
- 2020–2021: Universo Treviso Basket
- 2021: Pallacanestro Biella
- 2021–2022: Pallacanestro Forlì
- 2022: Eurobasket Roma
- 2022–2023: Helsinki Seagulls
- 2023–2024: MLP Academics Heidelberg
- 2025–2026: Phoenix Hagen
- 2026–present: Denain Voltaire

Career highlights
- Second-team All-Big 12 (2017); Third-team All-Big 12 (2018)
- Stats at Basketball Reference

Jeffrey Carroll (born November 6, 1994) is an American professional basketball player for Denain Voltaire of the LNB Élite. He played college basketball for the Oklahoma State Cowboys.

== College career ==
Carroll averaged 8.2 points and 4.0 rebounds per game as a sophomore at Oklahoma State. As a junior, Carroll was named to the Second-team All-Big 12. He averaged 17.5 points and 6.6 rebounds per game. Carroll missed the first three games of his senior season as the program was under review. As a senior, Carroll was named to the Third-team All-Big 12. He averaged 15.4 points, 6.2 rebounds and 1.8 assists per game.

== Professional career ==
After going undrafted in the 2018 NBA draft, he joined the Los Angeles Lakers for the 2018 NBA Summer League, averaging 4.2 points and 2.0 rebounds per game. On July 19, 2018, Carroll signed with the Lakers. On October 8, 2018, Carroll was waived by the Lakers. He subsequently signed with the Lakers' G League affiliate, the South Bay Lakers.

During the 2019–20 season he played in the Italian second-tier national league, the Serie A2 Basket for Bergamo Basket, averaging 17.9 points and 6.2 rebounds per game. On May 22, 2020, Carroll signed with Universo Treviso Basket in the top tier LBA Italian league.

In June 2020, it was revealed that Carroll was a victim of former assistant coach Lamont Evans, who was sentenced to three months in prison on bribery charges. This was related to Carroll's three-game suspension in college.

At the beginning of 2021, before the end of the 2020–21 LBA season, Carroll moves from Treviso back to the Serie A2 signing for Pallacanestro Biella. After a brief stint with Pallacanestro Forlì, at the end of December, 2021 he would sign a contract with Eurobasket Roma.

In August 2022, Carroll signed a contract with the Helsinki Seagulls in Finland.

On July 11, 2025, he signed with Phoenix Hagen of the ProA and won the championship, which resulted in the promotion of the club to the Basketball Bundesliga (BBL). In July 2026, the club announced that no agreement had been reached during contract negotiations, regarding continued cooperation. Carroll later signed with Denain Voltaire.

=== The Basketball Tournament ===
Carroll joined Stillwater Stars, composed of Oklahoma State alumni, in The Basketball Tournament 2020.
