= 2020–21 Brescia Leonessa season =

Italian basketball season

Basket Brescia Leonessa
2020-21 season
- Owner: Graziella Bragaglio; Matteo Bonetti
- President: Graziella Bragaglio
- Head coach: Maurizio Buscaglia
- Arena: PalaLeonessa
- LBA: 9th of 15
- EuroCup: Regular season (6th of 6)
- Supercup: Group stage (2nd of 4)

The 2020–21 season is Brescia Leonessa's 12th in existence and the club's 6th consecutive season in the top tier Italian basketball.

== Kit ==
Supplier: Errea / Sponsor: Germani

Home	Home

== Players ==
=== Current roster ===
Germani Basket Brescia roster
Players
Coaches

Pos.	No.	Nat.	Name	Ht.	Wt.	Age
PG	7	(Italy)	Vitali, Luca	2.01 m (6 ft 7 in)	85 kg (187 lb)	38 – 9 May 1986
SF	8	(Italy)	Parrillo, Salvatore	1.92 m (6 ft 4 in)	92 kg (203 lb)	32 – 1 December 1992
PG	11	(Canada)	Chery, Kenny	1.80 m (5 ft 11 in)	82 kg (181 lb)	33 – 24 January 1992
SG	12	(Italy)	Bortolani, Giordano	1.93 m (6 ft 4 in)	85 kg (187 lb)	24 – 2 December 2000
PF	19	(Portugal)	Wilson, Jeremiah	2.04 m (6 ft 8 in)	100 kg (220 lb)	36 – 19 April 1988
F/C	21	(United States)	Willis, Darral	2.06 m (6 ft 9 in)	102 kg (225 lb)	29 – 21 January 1996
SF	22	(United States)	Crawford, Drew	1.96 m (6 ft 5 in)	95 kg (209 lb)	34 – 18 October 1990
F/C	23	(Italy)	Burns, Christian	2.03 m (6 ft 8 in)	110 kg (243 lb)	39 – 4 September 1985
SG	24	(United States)	Kalinoski, Tyler	1.93 m (6 ft 4 in)	82 kg (181 lb)	32 – 19 December 1992
SF	34	(United States)	Moss, David (C)	1.96 m (6 ft 5 in)	100 kg (220 lb)	41 – 9 September 1983
F	41	(Italy)	Sacchetti, Brian	2.00 m (6 ft 7 in)	100 kg (220 lb)	38 – 4 May 1986

Head coach

- (Italy) Maurizio Buscaglia

Assistant coach(es)

- (Italy) Giacomo Baioni
- (Italy) Matteo Cotelli
- (Italy) Gianpaolo Alberti

Legend

- (C) Team captain
- Injured

- Roster
Updated: 10 May 2021

Note: Flags indicate national team eligibility at FIBA-sanctioned events. Players may hold other non-FIBA nationalities not displayed.

=== Depth chart ===
Pos.	Starting 5	Bench 1	Bench 2
C	Darral Willis	Christian Burns
PF	Jeremiah Wilson	Brian Sacchetti
SF	Drew Crawford	David Moss	Salvatore Parrillo
SG	Tyler Kalinoski	Giordano Bortolani
PG	Kenny Chery	Luca Vitali

6+6 format (colours: Italian or homegrown players; foreign players; young players)

=== Squad changes ===
==== In ====
No.	Pos.	Nat.	Name	Age	Moving from		Type	Ends	Transfer fee	Date	Source
24	SG	(United States)	Tyler Kalinoski	27	Bandırma	(Turkey)	1 year	June 2021	Free	18 June 2020	
11	PG	(Canada)	Kenny Chery	28	Nanterre 92	(France)	1 year	June 2021	Free	27 June 2020	
12	SG	(Italy)	Giordano Bortolani	19	Pallacanestro Biella	(Italy)	2 year loan from Milano	June 2022	Free	1 July 2020	
23	F/C	(Italy) (United States)	Christian Burns	34	Olimpia Milano	(Italy)	1+1 years	June 2021 + 2022	Free	4 July 2020	
22	SF	(United States)	Drew Crawford	29	Olimpia Milano	(Italy)	2 years	June 2022	Free	5 July 2020	
8	SF	(Italy)	Salvatore Parrillo	27	Pallacenestro Orzinuovi	(Italy)	1 year	June 2021	Free	13 July 2020	
6	F/C	(Israel) (United States)	T. J. Cline	26	Hapoel Holon	(Israel)	1 year	June 2021	Free	22 July 2020	
21	C	(Serbia)	Dušan Ristić	24	Astana	(Kazakhstan)	1 year loan from Crvena zvezda	June 2021	Free	24 July 2020	
45	C	(Italy)	Andrea Ancellotti	32	Latina Basket	(Italy)	1 year	June 2021	Free	1 August 2020	
16	C	(Italy)	Daniele Magro	33	Dinamo Sassari	(Italy)	2 months	September 2020	Free	1 August 2020	
21	F/C	(United States)	Darral Willis	25	Monaco	(France)	End of the season	June 2021	Undisclosed	21 January 2021	
19	PF	(Portugal) (United States)	Jeremiah Wilson	32	Al-Ittihad Jeddah	(Saudi Arabia)	End of the season	June 2021	Free	21 January 2021	

1. In players: Players who signed after the beginning of the season

==== Out ====
No.	Pos.	Nat.	Name	Age	Moving to		Type	Transfer fee	Date	Source
9	SG	(United States)	DeAndre Lansdowne	31	SIG Strasbourg	(France)	End of contract	Free	8 June 2020	
5	SF	(Italy)	Awudu Abass	27	Virtus Bologna	(Italy)	End of contract	Free	12 June 2020	
8	PG	(Italy)	Tommaso Laquintana	24	Pallacanestro Trieste	(Italy)	End of contract	Free	26 June 2020	
0	C	(Italy)	Andrea Zerini	31	Napoli Basket	(Italy)	End of contract	Free	1 July 2020	
2	PG	(United States)	Travis Trice	27	Galatasaray	(Turkey)	End of contract	Free	1 July 2020	
4	SG	(Italy)	Marco Ceron	28	Scaligera Verona	(Italy)	End of contract	Free	1 July 2020	
30	F	(United States)	Ken Horton	30	San Pablo Burgos	(Spain)	End of contract	Free	1 July 2020	
18	C	(Italy)	Tommaso Guariglia	22	Assigeco Piacenza	(Italy)	Loan contract	Undisclosed	29 July 2020	
6	C	(United States)	Tyler Cain	32	VL Pesaro	(Italy)	Transfer	Undisclosed	31 July 2020	
16	C	(Italy)	Daniele Magro	33	Eurobasket Roma	(Italy)	End of contract	Free	25 September 2020	
6	F/C	(Israel) (United States)	T. J. Cline	26	Maccabi Tel Aviv	(Israel)	Transfer	Undisclosed	24 January 2021	
21	C	(Serbia)	Dušan Ristić	25	Avtodor Saratov	(Russia)	Mutual consent	Free	27 January 2021	
45	C	(Italy)	Andrea Ancellotti	32	Blu Basket Treviglio	(Italy)	Transfer	Undisclosed	12 February 2021	

1. Out players: Players who left before the end of the season

==== Confirmed ====
No.	Pos.	Nat.	Name	Age	Moving from		Type	Ends	Transfer fee	Date	Source
34	SF	(United States)	David Moss	36	Olimpia Milano	(Italy)	4 + 1 years	June 2021	Free	21 March 2016	
7	PG	(Italy)	Luca Vitali	34	Vanoli Cremona	(Italy)	1 + 1 + 4 years	June 2022	Free	16 July 2016	
41	PF	(Italy)	Brian Sacchetti	34	Dinamo Sassari	(Italy)	2 + 3 year	June 2021	Free	1 July 2017	

==== Coach ====
Nat.	Name	Age.	Previous team		Type	Ends	Start Date	Status	End date
(Italy)	Maurizio Buscaglia	51	Reggio Emilia	(Italy)	1 year	June 2021	1 December 2020	active	
(Italy)	Vincenzo Esposito	51	Dinamo Sassari	(Italy)	2 years	June 2021	26 May 2019	Sacked	1 December 2020

== Competitions ==
=== Supercup ===
Pos	Team	Pld	W	L	PF	PA	PD	Qualification
1	AX Armani Exchange Milano	6	6	0	576	433	+143	Advance to Final Four
2	Germani Basket Brescia	6	3	3	499	515	−16	
3	Openjobmetis Varese	6	2	4	500	548	−48	
4	S.Bernardo Cantù	6	1	5	444	523	−79	

Source: LegaBasket Serie A
Rules for classification: All points scored in extra period(s) were not counted in the standings, nor for any tie-break situation.

=== Serie A ===
Pos	Team	Pld	W	L	PF	PA	PD	Qualification
7	Allianz Pallacanestro Trieste	28	14	14	2253	2249	+4	Qualification to Playoffs
8	Dolomiti Energia Trento	28	13	15	2191	2228	−37	Qualification to Playoffs
9	Germani Basket Brescia	28	11	17	2299	2389	−90	
10	Vanoli Cremona	28	11	17	2370	2395	−25	
11	UNAHOTELS Reggio Emilia	28	10	18	2122	2261	−139	

Updated to match(es) played on 10 May 2021. Source: LBA

=== Eurocup ===
==== Regular season ====
Pos	Team	Pld	W	L	PF	PA	PD	Qualification
1	(France) Metropolitans 92	10	7	3	809	786	+23	Advance to Top 16
2	(Spain) Unicaja	10	7	3	875	811	+64	Advance to Top 16
3	(Montenegro) Mornar	10	5	5	788	807	−19	Advance to Top 16
4	(Montenegro) Budućnost VOLI	10	5	5	785	785	0	Advance to Top 16
5	(Germany) ratiopharm Ulm	10	4	6	786	773	+13	
6	(Italy) Germani Brescia	10	2	8	751	832	−81	

Source: EuroCup Basketball
Rules for classification: All points scored in extra period(s) were not counted in the standings, nor for any tie-break situation.

== See also ==
- 2020–21 LBA season
- 2020–21 EuroCup Basketball
- 2020 Italian Basketball Supercup
