= Jazz Johnson =

American basketball player (born 1996)

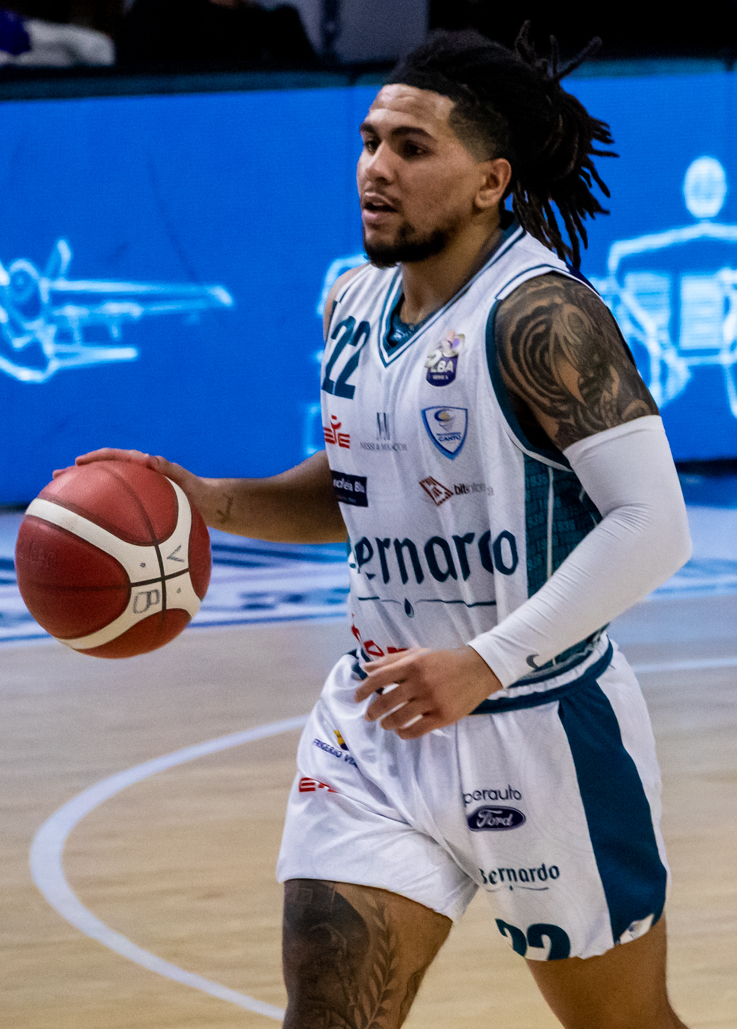
- Johnson in 2020 playing for Cantù

No. 2 – Victoria Libertas Pesaro
- Position: Point guard
- League: Serie A2

Personal information
- Born: September 26, 1996 (age 30) Portland, Oregon, U.S.
- Listed height: 5 ft 10 in (1.78 m)
- Listed weight: 190 lb (86 kg)

Career information
- High school: Benson Polytechnic (Portland, Oregon); Milwaukie (Milwaukie, Oregon); Lake Oswego (Lake Oswego, Oregon)
- College: Portland (2015–2017); Nevada (2018–2020)
- NBA draft: 2020: undrafted
- Playing career: 2020–present

Career history
- 2020–2021: Cantù
- 2021–2022: Pistoia Basket 2000
- 2022–2023: Rinascita Basket Rimini
- 2023–2025: Real Sebastiani Rieti
- 2025–2026: Pistoia Basket 2000
- 2026–present: Victoria Libertas Pesaro

Career highlights
- Second-team All-Mountain West (2020); Mountain West Sixth Man of the Year (2019)

Jaaziel "Jazz" Johnson (born September 26, 1996) is an American professional basketball player for Victoria Libertas Pesaro of the Italian Serie A2. He played college basketball for the Portland Pilots and Nevada Wolf Pack.

== Early life and high school career ==
In fourth grade, Johnson wrote one of his goals was to play basketball at Oregon State, his grandfather's favorite team. Growing up, he played baseball, soccer, football and basketball, but ultimately decided to focus on basketball. He did not shoot three-pointers in games until eighth grade.

Johnson attended Benson Polytechnic High School in Portland, Oregon, for his freshman season, earning second-team All-Portland honors. He transferred to Milwaukie High School as a sophomore and led the conference in scoring and was named first-team All-Northwest Oregon. Johnson transferred to Lake Oswego High School before his junior season. At the 2014 Les Schwab Invitational, Johnson set the tournament scoring record, averaging 35 points per game. Johnson earned second-team 6A All-State honors as a senior and led the Three Rivers League in scoring. He committed to Portland, which was the first school to offer him a scholarship, during his sophomore year.

== College career ==
As a freshman at Portland, Johnson made one start and averaged 6.8 points and 1.1 rebounds per game. Following the season, coach Eric Reveno was fired and was replaced by Terry Porter. As a sophomore, Johnson averaged 15.8 points, 2.8 rebounds and 2.3 assists per game and was named Honorable Mention All-WCC. Porter told him after the season that he would not receive as many minutes going forward, so Johnson opted to enter the transfer portal. He received interest from Houston, Boise State and several Big Sky programs. Nevada coach Eric Musselman was undecided about whether to offer Johnson a scholarship due to his height, but his son Matthew convinced him. Johnson signed with the Wolf Pack on May 3, 2017, joining three other transfers.

Due to NCAA regulations, Johnson redshirted the 2017–18 season, practicing with his teammates as Nevada reached the Sweet 16. Coming into his junior season, he was tasked with replacing Kendall Stephens. He missed one game with a shoulder injury. Johnson averaged 11 points, 1.8 rebounds and 1.5 assists per game and was named Mountain West Sixth Man of the Year. After the season, Johnson underwent shoulder surgery and entered the transfer portal after coach Musselman left for Arkansas. He ultimately opted to return to Nevada. On January 4, 2020, Johnson posted career highs in points (34), rebounds (seven), and three pointers (8-of-12) while contributing two assists in an 83–66 victory over Boise State. As a senior, Johnson averaged 15.9 points, 3.3 rebounds, and 2.0 assists per game, shooting 41.7 percent from behind the arc. He was named to the Second Team All-Mountain West by the coaches. Johnson scored 1,563 points in his career and made 256 three-pointers.

== Professional career ==
On July 29, 2020, Johnson signed his first professional contract with Pallacanestro Cantù of the Italian Serie A. In his debut against Virtus Bologna on September 27, Johnson scored 12 points in an 84–65 loss. He scored a season-high 26 points against Pallacanestro Brescia. Johnson averaged 10.9 points, 2.8 assists and 2.0 rebounds per game, shooting 42.1 percent from the field.

On August 5, 2021, he signed with Pistoia Basket 2000 of the Serie A2. During the first two phases of the championship, he played 16 games averaging 18.6 points, 2.2 assists and 2.7 rebounds per game while shooting 46.4% (39-for-84) on three-point shots. The team finished third in its group and clinched a playoff berth. During the postseason, Johnson averaged 16.1 points, 2.6 assists and 2.7 rebounds in 10 games.

His experience in the Italian Serie A2 continued with Rinascita Basket Rimini after he signed for the 2022–23 season.

On July 2, 2025, he signed with Pistoia Basket 2000 of the Italian Serie A2.

== Personal life ==
Johnson's father Leland played basketball at the College of Alameda. He was shot in the abdomen and head one day and was paralyzed from the waist down for several years. After regaining feeling in his legs, he moved to Oregon, met Shannon, and had a son and daughter. He played football for the indoor Portland Forest Dragons during the 1990s. Leland became a high-level basketball trainer and coached several sports. Johnson's given name, Jaaziel, means "strength of God." Growing up, Johnson was a Golden State Warriors fan but his favorite player was Shaquille O'Neal. A close friend of his, Portland State basketball player Deante Strickland, was killed by his sister Tamena in August 2019.
