= Frank Gaines (basketball) =

American basketball player (born 1990)

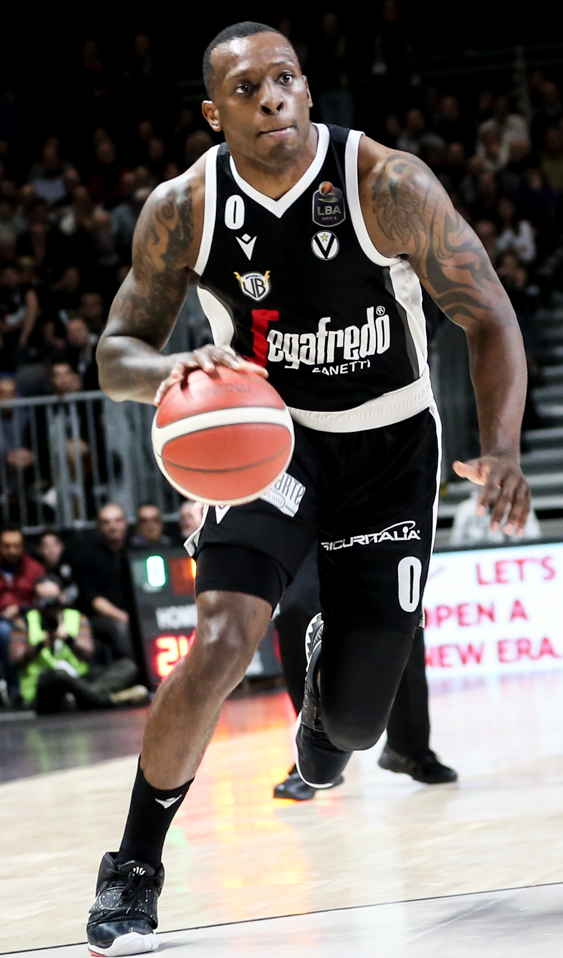
- Gaines in 2019

BC Vienna
- Position: Point guard / shooting guard
- League: Austrian Basketball Superliga

Personal information
- Born: July 7, 1990 (age 36) Fort Lauderdale, Florida, U.S.
- Listed height: 1.91 m (6 ft 3 in)
- Listed weight: 88 kg (194 lb)

Career information
- High school: Boyd Anderson (Lauderdale Lakes, Florida)
- College: IPFW (2009–2013)
- NBA draft: 2013: undrafted
- Playing career: 2013–present

Career history
- 2013–2014: Maine Red Claws
- 2014: Gigantes de Guayana
- 2014: Juvecaserta Basket
- 2014–2015: Victoria Libertas Pesaro
- 2015: Oklahoma City Blue
- 2015: Caciques de Humacao
- 2015–2016: Wilki Morskie Szczecin
- 2016–2017: SC Rasta Vechta
- 2017–2018: Parma
- 2018–2019: Cantù
- 2018: Henan Shedianlaojiu
- 2019–2020: Virtus Bologna
- 2020: Bnei Herzliya
- 2020–2021: Pallacanestro Cantù
- 2021: Scafati Basket
- 2021: Cangrejeros de Santurce
- 2021–2022: S.L. Benfica
- 2022–2023: Pallacanestro Trieste
- 2023: Fos Provence Basket
- 2023: Latina Basket
- 2024: Tigers Tübingen
- 2024: Metros de Santiago
- 2024–present: BC Vienna

Career highlights
- LPB champion (2022); LBA Top Scorer (2019); NBA D-League Most Improved Player (2014); 2× First-team All-Summit League (2012, 2013)

Frank Brandon Gaines (born July 7, 1990) is an American professional basketball player for BC Vienna of the Austrian Basketball Superliga. He played college basketball for Indiana University–Purdue University Fort Wayne.

== High school career ==
Gaines attended Boyd H. Anderson High School in Lauderdale Lakes, Florida. As a senior, he averaged 16.7 points and 7.0 rebounds per game for head coach Eugene Richardson. Gaines helped lead Boyd Anderson to a 30–2 record, eventually losing in the Florida 6A State Final.

== College career ==
After redshirting his freshman season in 2008–09, he made his debut for the Mastodons in the 2009–10 season. In his redshirted freshman season, he played 31 games (one start), averaging 4.2 points and 2.3 rebounds in 13.4 minutes per game.

In his sophomore season, he became a go-to offensive and rebounding force for the Mastodons, going on to earn All-Summit League Honorable Mention honors. On January 31, 2011, he was named the Summit League Player of the Week. In 30 games, he averaged 14.8 points and 6.2 rebounds in 27.4 minutes per game.

In his junior season, he was named to the All-Summit League first team and the NABC All-District second team. He hit at least one three-point basket in 24 of 30 games on the year, including a season-high five at home against Oral Roberts on February 15, 2012. In 30 games, he averaged 21.2 points, 5.9 rebounds, 1.2 assists and 1.4 steals in 32.1 minutes per game.

In his senior season, he was named to the All-Summit League first team for the second straight year. He was also named to the Summit League All-Tournament Team. In 32 games, he averaged 19.8 points, 4.0 rebounds, 1.2 assists and 1.4 steals in 34.0 minutes per game.

== Professional career ==
=== 2013–14 season ===
Gaines went undrafted in the 2013 NBA draft. On November 1, 2013, he was selected by the Maine Red Claws with the 1st pick of the second round in the 2013 NBA Development League Draft. On April 22, 2014, he was named the 2014 NBA Development League Most Improved Player.

On April 7, 2014, he signed with Gigantes de Guayana of Venezuela for the rest of the 2014 LPB season. He left Gigantes later that month after just five games.

=== 2014–15 season ===
On June 17, 2014, Gaines signed with Juvecaserta Basket of Italy for the 2014–15 season. In July 2014, he joined the Indiana Pacers for the Orlando Summer League and the Miami Heat for the Las Vegas Summer League. On December 17, 2014, he parted ways with Juvecaserta. The next day, he signed a two-month deal with Victoria Libertas Pesaro. On February 18, 2015, he parted ways with the club following the expiration of his contract.

On February 27, Gaines joined the Oklahoma City Blue after the team acquired his returning player rights from the Maine Red Claws. In April 2015, after the end of the 2014–15 D-League season, he signed with Caciques de Humacao of Puerto Rico for the rest of the 2015 BSN season.

=== 2015–16 season ===
In July 2015, Gaines joined the Oklahoma City Thunder for the 2015 NBA Summer League. On August 17, 2015, he signed with Wilki Morskie Szczecin of Poland for the 2015–16 season.

=== 2016–17 season ===
On July 29, 2016, Gaines signed with SC Rasta Vechta of Germany for the 2016–17 season.

=== The Basketball Tournament (TBT) (2016–2017) ===
In the summers of 2016 and 2017, Gaines played in The Basketball Tournament on ESPN for Team 23. He competed for the $2 million prize, and for Team 23 in 2017, he averaged 11.5 points per game. Gaines helped Team 23 reach the second round of the tournament in 2017, where they then lost to Armored Athlete 84–77.

=== 2018–19 season ===
On June 14, 2018, Gaines signed with Pallacanestro Cantù of LBA for the 2018–19 season.

=== 2019–20 season ===
On July 18, 2019, he has signed with Virtus Bologna of the Italian Lega Basket Serie A (LBA). He averaged 9.7 points and 2.1 rebounds per game in the Serie A.

=== 2020–21 season ===
On July 30, 2020, Gaines signed with Bnei Herzliya of the Israeli National League.

On January 4, 2021, Gaines returned to Pallacanestro Cantù for which he played two seasons beforehand.

Cantù ended the season in the last position and Gaines signed with Scafati Basket for the 2021 Serie A2 playoffs.

=== 2021–22 season ===
On August 9, 2021, Gaines signed with Cangrejeros de Santurce of the Baloncesto Superior Nacional. He averaged 18.7 points, 3.3 rebounds, 2.8 assists and 1.0 steal per game. On November 13, Gaines signed with S.L. Benfica of the Liga Portuguesa de Basquetebol.

=== 2022–23 season ===
On August 12, 2022, he has signed with Pallacanestro Trieste of the Italia Lega Basket Serie A (LBA). On February 13, 2023, he was released by Trieste and signed with Fos Provence Basket of the LNB Pro A.

=== 2024–25 season ===
On December 6, 2024, Gaines signed with BC Vienna of the Austrian Basketball Superliga.

== Personal life ==
Gaines is the son of Frank Sr. and Ronae Gaines, and has three siblings, Dwight, Alicia and Lashonda.
