= Basket Torino =

- Leagues: Serie A2
- Founded: 31 May 2019; 7 years ago
- Arena: PalaRuffini
- Capacity: 3,971
- Location: Turin, Piedmont, Italy
- Team colors: Yellow, Blue
- Main sponsor: Reale Mutua
- President: David Avino
- General manager: -
- Head coach: Paolo Moretti
- Team captain: Matteo Schina
- Ownership: David Avino
- Website: baskettorinoofficial.com
Home	Away

Basket Torino, for sponsorship reasons Reale Mutua Torino, is an Italian basketball club based in Turin. Established in 2019 as successor of Auxilium Torino, the club will make its debut in the 2019–20 Serie A2 Basket.

== History ==
In June 2019, Auxilium Torino was dissolved after the club was declared bankrupt after months of financial struggles, which had led to relegation from the Lega Basket Serie A in May. As a result, Reale Mutua Basket Torino was founded after Stefano Sardara moved his club Dinamo Academy Cagliari from Cagliari to Turin. The team will make its debut in the 2019–20 season in the Serie A2 Basket, Italy's second tier. Stefano Sardara was the majority holder with 75% while the Una Mole di Basket organization owns 25% of the club. On 21 June 2019, Demis Cavina was announced as head coach. On 5 July 2019, the team's logo featuring a Turin bull was presented.

In the club's debut 2019–20 season, Torino was first in the West Division with an 18–8 record, before the season was cancelled due to the COVID-19 pandemic. In July 2020, a group of Turkish investors led by basketball coach Ergin Ataman became owners of the club.

In the 2021 the team competes in the Green Division of A2 league. A season without the live support of fans due to COVID-19 pandemic. The regular season ends with 18-7 record, first place. In the post season "fase ad orologio" Torino catches the second place with a record of 6-4 and get the chance to play home in the key matches of the playoffs "Silver Tournament". Quarter of Finals are won 3-0 against Mantova, Semifinals are won 3-0 against Verona, Finals are lost 2-3 against Tortona that got the promotion to LBA serie A.

In July 2021 the ownership moves from Stefano Sardara and Ergin Ataman to David Avino that will held the role of president of Basket Torino.

In the 2021-2022 season the team competes in the Green Division of A2 league. The regular season ends with 16-14 record, sixth place. In the post season "fase ad orologio" Torino catches the first place of "girone blu" with a record of 1-3 and get the chance to play playoffs "Silver Tournament". Quarter of Finals are lost 1-3 against Ravenna.

In the 2022-2023 season the team competes in the Green Division of A2 league. The season starts with 3 point penalty but at the regular season ends with 16-8 record, fourth place. In the post season "fase ad orologio" Torino catches the first place of "girone blu" with a record of 8-2 and get the chance to play playoffs "Silver Tournament". Quarter of Finals are won 3-1 against Urania Milano, Semifinals are won 3-1 against Treviglio, Finals are lost 1-3 against Pistoia Basket that got the promotion to LBA serie A.

== Sponsorship names ==
Due to sponsorships reasons, the team has been known as:

- Reale Mutua Torino (2019–present)

== Players ==
=== Current roster ===
Reale Mutua Torino Basket roster
Players
Coaches

Pos.	No.	Nat.	Name	Ht.	Wt.	Age
PG	3	(Italy)	Vencato, Luca	1.94 m (6 ft 4 in)	91 kg (201 lb)	31 – 31 May 1995
SF	6	(Italy)	Ghirlanda, Matteo	2.02 m (6 ft 8 in)	94 kg (207 lb)	25 – 12 March 2001
PG	8	(Italy)	Schina, Matteo	1.80 m (5 ft 11 in)	80 kg (176 lb)	25 – 16 March 2001
PF	12	(Italy)	Poser, Federico	2.03 m (6 ft 8 in)	104 kg (229 lb)	26 – 17 August 1999
SF	21	(Italy)	De Vico, Niccolò (C)	1.98 m (6 ft 6 in)	94 kg (207 lb)	31 – 19 July 1994
C	22	(Italy)	Cusin, Marco	2.11 m (6 ft 11 in)	107 kg (236 lb)	41 – 28 February 1985
SG	40	(Italy)	Pepe, Simone	1.84 m (6 ft 0 in)	90 kg (198 lb)	33 – 29 March 1993

Head coach

- (Italy) Franco Ciani

Assistant coach(es)

- (Italy) Alessandro Iacozza
- (Italy) Marco Siragusa

Legend

- (C) Team captain
- Injured

- Roster

Note: Flags indicate national team eligibility at FIBA-sanctioned events. Players may hold other non-FIBA nationalities not displayed.
