= 2020 Italian Basketball Supercup =

2020 Eurosport Supercoppa

Tournament details
- Arena: Segafredo Arena (Note: Final Four); Bologna, Italy
- Dates: 27 August–20 September 2020

Final positions
- Champions: AX Armani Exchange Milano (4th title)
- Runners-up: Segafredo Virtus Bologna

Awards and statistics
- MVP: (United States) Malcolm Delaney

The 2020 Italian Basketball Supercup (Italian: Supercoppa di pallacanestro 2020), also known as Eurosport Supercoppa 2020 for sponsorship reasons, was the 26th edition of the super cup tournament, organized by the Lega Basket Serie A (LBA).

For the first time in history, all the teams of LBA took part in the Supercup, due to the early conclusion of the 2019–20 season caused by COVID-19 pandemic.

== Participant teams ==
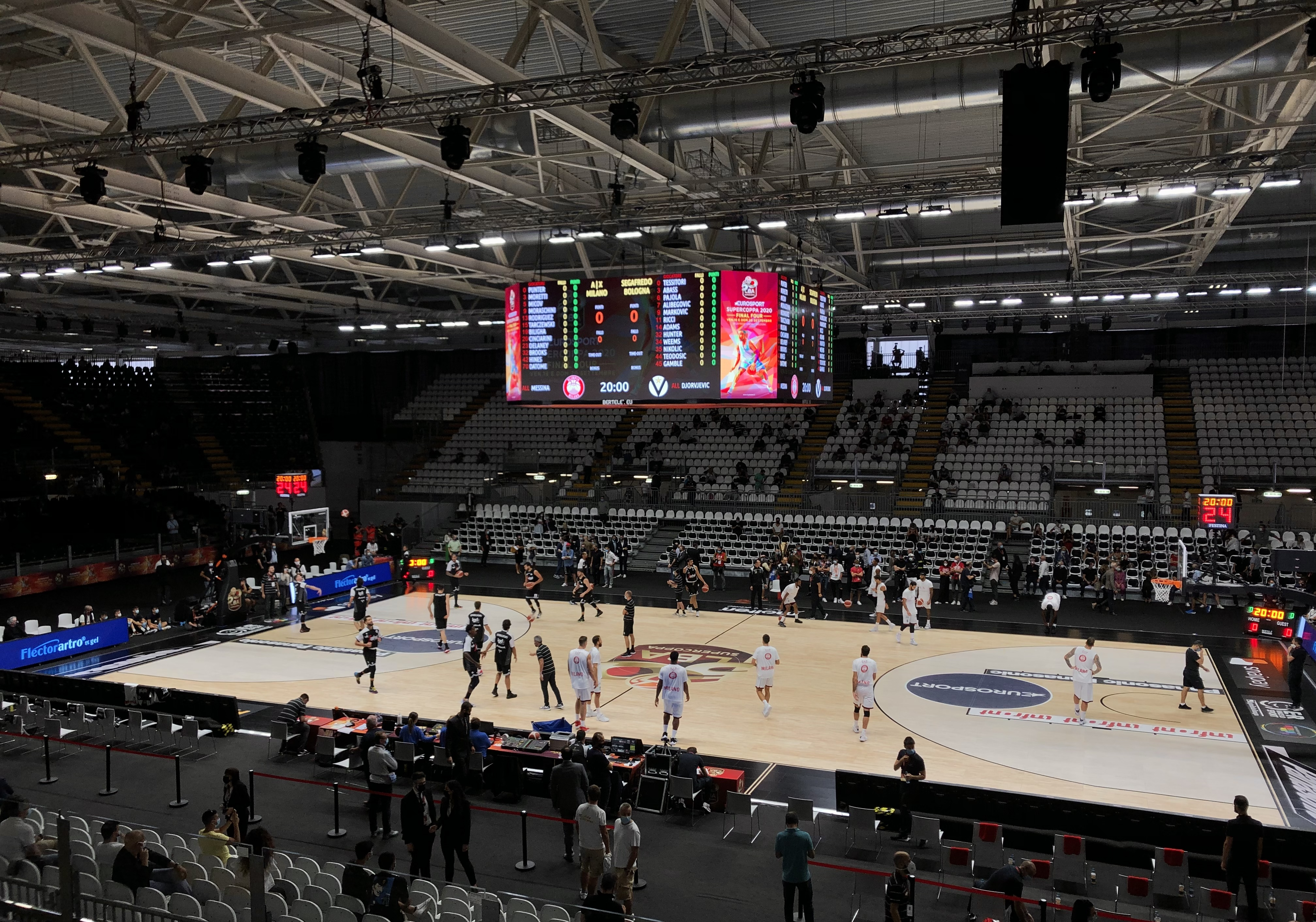
Segafredo Arena during the cup's final in September 2020

Team	Home city	Arena	Capacity
Allianz Pallacanestro Trieste	Trieste	Allianz Dome	6,943
AX Armani Exchange Milano	Milan	Mediolanum Forum	12,700
AX Armani Exchange Milano	Milan	Allianz Cloud	5,420
Banco di Sardegna Sassari	Sassari	PalaSerradimigni	5,000
Carpegna Prosciutto Pesaro	Pesaro	Adriatic Arena	10,323
De' Longhi Treviso	Treviso	PalaVerde	5,134
Dolomiti Energia Trento	Trento	BLM Group Arena	4,360
Germani Basket Brescia	Brescia	PalaLeonessa	5,200
UnaHotels Reggio Emilia	Reggio Emilia	Unipol Arena	11,000
Happy Casa Brindisi	Brindisi	PalaPentassuglia	3,534
Openjobmetis Varese	Varese	Enerxenia Arena	5,100
Lavoropiù Fortitudo Bologna	Bologna	Unipol Arena	11,000
S.Bernardo Cantù	Cantù	PalaBancoDesio	6,700
Segafredo Virtus Bologna	Bologna	PalaDozza	5,570
Segafredo Virtus Bologna	Bologna	Virtus Arena	8,970
Umana Reyer Venezia	Venice	Palasport Taliercio	3,506
Vanoli Cremona	Cremona	PalaRadi	3,511
Virtus Roma	Rome	PalaLottomatica	11,200

== Group stage ==
=== Group A ===
Pos	Team	Pld	W	L	PF	PA	PD	Qualification
1	AX Armani Exchange Milano	6	6	0	576	433	+143	Advance to Final Four
2	Germani Basket Brescia	6	3	3	499	515	−16	
3	Openjobmetis Varese	6	2	4	500	548	−48	
4	S.Bernardo Cantù	6	1	5	444	523	−79	

Source: LegaBasket Serie A
Rules for classification: All points scored in extra period(s) were not counted in the standings, nor for any tie-break situation.

=== Group B ===
Pos	Team	Pld	W	L	PF	PA	PD	Qualification
1	Segafredo Virtus Bologna	6	5	1	490	428	+62	Advance to Final Four
2	UnaHotels Reggio Emilia	6	3	3	479	477	+2	
3	Lavoropiù Fortitudo Bologna	6	3	3	506	496	+10	
4	Vanoli Cremona	6	1	5	408	482	−74	

Source: LegaBasket Serie A
Rules for classification: All points scored in extra period(s) were not counted in the standings, nor for any tie-break situation.

=== Group C ===
Pos	Team	Pld	W	L	PF	PA	PD	Qualification
1	Umana Reyer Venezia	6	4	2	462	434	+28	Advance to Final Four
2	De' Longhi Treviso	6	3	3	475	459	+16	
3	Allianz Pallacanestro Trieste	6	3	3	428	467	−39	
4	Dolomiti Energia Trento	6	2	4	467	472	−5	

Source: LegaBasket Serie A
Rules for classification: All points scored in extra period(s) were not counted in the standings, nor for any tie-break situation.

=== Group D ===
Pos	Team	Pld	W	L	PF	PA	PD	Qualification
1	Banco di Sardegna Sassari	6	4	2	563	484	+79	Advance to Final Four
2	Happy Casa Brindisi	6	4	2	528	470	+58	
3	Carpegna Prosciutto Pesaro	6	4	2	498	435	+63	
4	Virtus Roma	6	0	6	394	594	−200	

Source: LegaBasket Serie A
Rules for classification: All points scored in extra period(s) were not counted in the standings, nor for any tie-break situation.

== Final Four ==
Semifinals; 18 September
1	AX Armani Exchange Milano	76
2	Umana Reyer Venezia	67
3	Banco di Sardegna Sassari	76
4	Segafredo Virtus Bologna	88

Final; 20 September
1	AX Armani Exchange Milano	75
2	Segafredo Virtus Bologna	68

== Semifinals ==
=== AX Armani Exchange Milano vs. Umana Reyer Venezia ===
18 September 2019	AX Armani Exchange Olimpia Milano	76–67	Umana Reyer Venezia	Bologna
18:00 (CEST)	Scoring by quarter: 26–15, 17–8, 14–23, 19–21
Eurosport	Pts: Delaney 19; Rebs: Tarczewski 6 Asts: Delaney 6 PIR: Delaney 32	Boxscore	Pts: Watt 19; Rebs: Daye 7 Asts: De Nicolao 8 PIR: Watt 26	Arena: Segafredo Arena; Referees: Saverio Lanzarini, Mark Bartoli, Guido Federico Di Francesco

=== Banco di Sardegna Sassari vs. Segafredo Virtus Bologna ===
18 September 2019	Banco di Sardegna Sassari	76–88	Segafredo Virtus Bologna	Bologna
20:45 (CEST)	Scoring by quarter: 24–19, 18–21, 17–22, 17–26
Eurosport	Pts: Bilan 24; Rebs: Bilan 13; Asts: Spissu 6 PIR: Bilan 37	Boxscore	Pts: Abass, Teodosić 13; Rebs: Gamble 8 Asts: Teodosić 6 PIR: Abass 16	Arena: Segafredo Arena; Referees: Tolga Sahin, Valerio Grigioni, Denis Quarta

== Final ==
=== AX Armani Exchange Milano vs. Segafredo Virtus Bologna ===
20 September 2019	AX Armani Exchange Milano	75–68	Segafredo Virtus Bologna	Bologna
18:00 (CEST)	Scoring by quarter: 21–16, 24–17, 8–18, 22–17
Nove, Eurosport	Pts: Datome 17; Rebs: Datome 6 Asts: Rodríguez 4 PIR: Datome 19	Boxscore	Pts: Alibegović 13; Rebs: Alibegović, Gamble 8 Asts: Teodosić 8 PIR: Gamble 21	Arena: Segafredo Arena; Referees: Carmelo Lo Guzzo, Manuel Mazzoni, Andrea Bongiorni

Starters:			Pts	Reb	Ast
PG	23	(United States) Malcolm Delaney	11	2	1
SG	0	(United States) Kevin Punter	14	3	2
SF	5	(Serbia) Vladimir Micov	2	2	0
PF	32	(Italy) Jeff Brooks	0	3	1
C	42	(United States) Kyle Hines	9	3	1
Reserves:					
SG	3	(Italy) Davide Moretti	0	0	0
SF	9	(Italy) Riccardo Moraschini	5	2	2
PG	13	(Spain) Sergio Rodríguez	9	3	4
PF	15	(United States) Kaleb Tarczewski	6	4	0
C	19	(Italy) Paul Biligha	0	0	0
PG	20	(Italy) Andrea Cinciarini	2	2	0
PF	70	(Italy) Luigi Datome	17	6	1
Head coach:
(Italian Basketball Federation) Ettore Messina

AX Armani Exchange Milano	Virtus Segafredo Bologna

Milano	Statistics	Bologna
16/35 (45.7%)	2 point field goals	21/35 (60.0%)
9/25 (36.0%)	3 point field goals	4/24 (16.7%)
16/24 (66.7%)	Free throws	14/17 (82.4%)
35	Rebounds	38
12	Assists	20
13	Steals	4
10	Turnovers	16
3	Blocks	1

Starters:			Pts	Reb	Ast
PG	44	(Serbia) Miloš Teodosić	6	1	8
SG	9	(Serbia) Stefan Marković	3	1	4
SF	34	(United States) Kyle Weems	5	3	4
PF	11	(Italy) Giampaolo Ricci	4	1	1
C	45	(United States) Julian Gamble	12	8	0
Reserves:					
C	0	(Italy) Amedeo Tessitori	DNP		
SF	3	(Italy) Awudu Abass	12	1	0
PG	6	(Italy) Alessandro Pajola	2	1	2
PF	7	(Bosnia and Herzegovina) Amar Alibegović	13	8	0
SG	14	(United States) Josh Adams	2	1	1
C	32	(United States) Vince Hunter	9	5	0
SF	35	(Serbia) Stefan Nikolić	DNP		
Head coach:
(Basketball Federation of Serbia) Aleksandar Đorđević

2020 Italian Supercup champions
AX Armani Exchange Olimpia Milano
4th title

== Sponsors ==
- Eurosport (title sponsor)
- Fastweb (technology partner)
- IBSA (gold sponsor)
- Molten (official ball)
