= Piero Bucchi =

Italian basketball head coach

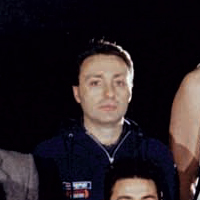

Scafati Basket
- Position: Head coach
- League: LBA

Personal information
- Born: 5 March 1958 (age 68) Bologna, Italy
- Coaching career: 1996–present

Career history

Coaching
- 1996–1999: Basket Rimini Crabs
- 1999–2001: Benneton Treviso
- 2001: Śląsk Wrocław
- 2001–2002: Basket Napoli
- 2002–2005: Virtus Roma
- 2005–2008: Basket Napoli
- 2008–2011: Olimpia Milano
- 2011–2016: New Basket Brindisi
- 2016–2017: Victoria Libertas Pesaro
- 2017: JuveCaserta
- 2018-2020: Virtus Roma
- 2021: Pallacanestro Cantù
- 2021–2024: Dinamo Sassari
- 2024–2026: New Basket Brindisi
- 2026–present: Scafati Basket

Career highlights
- 3x Serie A2 Basket champion (1997, 2002, 2012); Legadue Cup (2012); Lega Basket Serie A Best Coach (2000); 2x Serie A Cup (2000, 2006); Serie A Supercup (2001)

Piero Bucchi (born 5 March 1958) is an Italian basketball coach. He is the current head coach of Scafati Basket of the Lega Basket Serie A (LBA).

== Coaching career ==
Piero Bucchi started his coach-career with Basket Rimini Crabs in 1992. He became the head coach of that team in March 1996. At the end of the 1996–97 season he achieved the promotion to Serie A. At the beginning of the 1999–2000 Serie A season, he became the head coach of Benetton Treviso. With him they won two Cups and one Supercup.

Then he went to Basket Napoli and later to Lottomatica Roma where he remained for two and a half seasons, until his exemption during the 2004–05 Serie A season.

Piero returned to Napoli and won another Cup.

With the end of his contract with Napoli on 17 June 2008, he was engaged by the Giorgio Armani's staff, the new owner of Olimpia Milano for the 2008–09 Lega Basket Serie A. After reaching two playoffs finals with Milano, on 3 January 2011, Piero Bucchi was sacked due to a series of major defeats. He was replaced by Dan Peterson.

At the end of May 2011, Bucchi signed a two years contract with Enel Brindisi in Serie A2. On 4 May of the 2011–12 Serie A2 season, won the Serie A2 Cup and achieved the promotion to Serie A, after beating Pistoia Basket 88-86.

At the 2012–13 season, Brindisi obtained the first qualification to the Italian Cup.

On 4 May 2016 Piero Bucchi left Enel Brindisi after five years.

On 1 June that year he signed a two-years contract with Consultinvest Pesaro.

On 16 November 2021 Bucchi signed with Dinamo Sassari to replace Demis Cavina.

On May 16, 2024, he signed with Valtur Brindisi of the Serie A2.

On May 1, 2026, he signed with Scafati Basket of the Lega Basket Serie A (LBA).

== Honours and titles ==
Head coach

- Legadue Cup: 1

New Basket Brindisi (2012)

- Lega Basket Serie A: 1

Pallacanestro Treviso (2000)

- Italian Basketball Cup: 2

Pallacanestro Treviso (1999–2000)
Basket Napoli (2006)

- Italian Basketball Supercup: 1

Pallacanestro Treviso (2001)
