= Niccolò De Vico =

Italian basketball player (born 1994)

No. 21 – Victoria Libertas Pesaro
- Position: Small forward
- League: Serie A2

Personal information
- Born: 19 July 1994 (age 32) Monza, Italy
- Listed height: 1.98 m (6 ft 6 in)
- Listed weight: 93 kg (205 lb)

Career information
- NBA draft: 2016: undrafted
- Playing career: 2010–present

Career history
- 2010–2017: Biella
- 2017–2019: Reggiana
- 2019–2020: Vanoli Cremona
- 2020–2021: Pallacanestro Varese
- 2021–2024: Basket Torino
- 2024–2025: New Basket Brindisi
- 2025–2026: Fortitudo Bologna
- 2026–present: Victoria Libertas Pesaro

Niccolò De Vico (born 19 July 1994) is an Italian professional basketball player for Victoria Libertas Pesaro of the Italian Serie A2. Standing at 1.98 metres (6 feet 6 inches), he plays at the small forward position.

== Professional career ==
=== Clubs ===
Since 2009, Niccolò De Vico took part to the youth of Pallacanestro Biella. He made his first match in Serie A in 2010, just one minute against Montepaschi Siena. He became a stable player of Biella's roster since the 2012–13 season.

In 2014 he was called by Italy national basketball team coach, Stefano Sacripanti, to take part to the 2014 FIBA Europe Under-20 Championship.

During the 2014-15 LBA season he got more minutes thanks to coach Corbani. He ended the season with 5.2 points, 2.3 rebounds and 1.1 assists per match. At the end of the season Alan Voskuil got an injury so he could play some playoffs matches with great averages (10.4 points, 2.7 rebounds and 0.4 assists). In 2016 De Vico became team captain of Biella.

After 7 years in Biella, on 30 May 2017 De Vico signed a two-year contract with Pallacanestro Reggiana in the 2017–18 LBA season.

On 11 July 2019 he signed with Vanoli Cremona of the Italian Lega Basket Serie A (LBA).

At the end of the season he was released by Cremona due to the club's financial problems and, on 12 June 2020, he signed with Pallacanestro Varese a two-year contract.
