= 2016–17 Serie A2 Basket =

Serie A2 Basket
- Season: 2016–17
- Duration: 2 October 2016 – June 2017
- Games played: 480 (Regular season); 45–75 (Playoffs)
- Teams: 32
- TV partner: Sky Italia

Regular season
- Top seed: De' Longhi Treviso (East); Angelico Biella (West)
- Relegated: Ambalt Recanati; Basket Agropoli; Proger Chieti

Finals
- Champions: Segafredo Virtus Bologna
- Runners-up: Alma Trieste
- Semifinalists: OraSì Ravenna; Kontatto Bologna

Records
- Highest attendance: 9,000; Virtus Bologna 87–86 Fortitudo (6 January 2017)
- All statistics correct as of 20 June 2017.

The 2016–17 Serie A2 season, known for sponsorship reasons as the Serie A2 Citroën, is the 43rd season of the Italian basketball second league Serie A2 Basket. The season started on October 2, 2016, and will end in June 2017 with the last game of the promotion playoffs finals.

== Rules ==
The season is composed of 32 teams with a regional subdivision in two equal groups of sixteen, East and West. Each team plays the others in its subgroup twice, the first ranked team of each group then plays the eighth ranked team of the other group (e.g. East #1 against West #8), then the second best against the seventh, and so on, to form a promotion playoffs (for one place) of sixteen teams.

== Teams ==
=== By region ===
Number of teams	Region	Team(s)
7	Emilia-Romagna	Andrea Costa Imola; Assigeco Piacenza; Bondi Ferrara; Kontatto Bologna; OraSì Ravenna; Segafredo Virtus Bologna; Unieuro Forlì
5	Lazio	Benacquista Assicurazioni Latina; FMC Ferentino; NCP Rieti; Roma Gas & Power Roma; UniCusano Roma
3	Lombardy	Dinamica Mantova; Europromotion Legnano; Remer Treviglio
3	Piedmont	Angelico Biella; Novipiù Casale Monferrato; Orsi Tortona
2	Abruzzo	Roseto Sharks; Proger Chieti
2	Campania	Basket Agropoli; Givova Scafati
2	Friuli-Venezia Giulia	Alma Trieste; G.S.A. Udine
2	Marche	Aurora Basket Jesi; Ambalt Recanati
2	Sicily	Moncada Agrigento; Lighthouse Trapani
2	Veneto	De' Longhi Treviso; Tezenis Verona
1	Calabria	Viola Reggio Calabria
1	Tuscany	Mens Sana Siena

=== Venues ===
==== East ====
Team	Home city	Arena	Capacity
Alma Trieste	Trieste	PalaTrieste	6,943
Andrea Costa Imola	Imola	PalaRuggi	2,000
Assigeco Piacenza	Piacenza	PalaBanca	4,500
Aurora Basket Jesi	Jesi	UBI BPA Sport Center	3,500
Basket Recanati	Recanati	PalaCingolani	1,006
Bondi Ferrara	Ferrara	Pala Hilton Pharma	3,504
De' Longhi Treviso	Treviso	PalaVerde	5,134
Dinamica Mantova	Mantova	PalaBam	5,000
G.S.A. Udine	Udine	PalaCarnera	3,850
Kontatto Bologna	Bologna	Land Rover Arena	5,721
OraSì Ravenna	Ravenna	PalaDeAndré	3,500
Proger Chieti	Chieti	PalaTricalle Leombroni	2,600
Roseto Sharks	Roseto	PalaMaggetti	5,000
Segafredo Virtus Bologna	Bologna	Unipol Arena	9,513
Tezenis Verona	Verona	PalaOlimpia	5,350
Unieuro Forlì	Forlì	Unieuro Arena	6,511

==== West ====
Team	Home city	Arena	Capacity
Angelico Biella	Biella	BiellaForum	5,707
Basket Agropoli	Agropoli	PalaDiConcilio	1,500
Benacquista Latina	Latina	PalaBianchini	2,500
FMC Ferentino	Ferentino	Palazzetto Ponte Grande	2,000
Givova Scafati	Scafati	PalaMagnano	3,700
Lighthouse Trapani	Trapani	Palaillio	4,575
Mens Sana Siena	Siena	Palasport Mens Sana	7,050
Moncada Agrigento	Agrigento	PalaMoncada	3,200
Novipiù Casale M.	Casale M.	PalaFerraris	3,508
NPC Rieti	Rieti	PalaSojourner	3,550
Orsi Tortona	Tortona	PalaOltrepò	1,500
Remer Treviglio	Treviglio	PalaFacchetti	2,880
Roma Gas & Power	Rome	Palazzetto dello Sport	3,500
TWS Legnano	Legnano	Knights Palace	1,650
UniCusano Roma	Rome	Palazzetto dello Sport	3,500
Viola Reggio Calabria	Reggio Calabria	PalaCalafiore	8,500

=== Personnel and sponsorship ===
==== East ====
Team	Head coach	Captain	Kit manufacturer	Shirt sponsor
Alma Trieste	(Italy) Eugenio Dalmasson	(Italy) Andrea Coronica	Athletes	Alma
Andrea Costa Imola	(Italy) Giampiero Ticchi	(Argentina) Patricio Prato	Macron	
Assigeco Piacenza	(Italy) Marco Andreazza	(Italy) Luca Infante	Joma	Assigeco
Aurora Basket Jesi	(Italy) Damiano Cagnazzo	(Italy) Marco Maganza	Givova	Termoforgia
Basket Recanati	(Italy) Giancarlo Sacco	(Italy) Attilio Pierini	Macron	
Bondi Ferrara	(Italy) Adriano Furlani	(Italy) Riccardo Cortese	2T Sport	Bondi
De' Longhi Treviso	(Italy) Stefano Pillastrini	(Italy) Matteo Fantinelli	Erreà	De'Longhi
Dinamica Mantova	(Italy) Alberto Martelossi	(Italy) Lorenzo Gergati	Erreà	Dinamica Generale
G.S.A. Udine	(Italy) Lino Lardo	(Italy) Manuel Vanuzzo	Macron	G.S.A. Gruppo Servizi Associati
Kontatto Bologna	(Italy) Matteo Boniciolli	(Italy) Stefano Mancinelli	Kontatto	Kontatto
OraSì Ravenna	(Italy) Antimo Martino	(San Marino) Andrea Raschi	Macron	OraSì
Proger Chieti	(Italy) Massimo Galli	(Italy) Luigi Sergio	Sportika	Proger
Roseto Sharks	(Italy) Emanuele Di Paolantonio	(Italy) Robert Fultz	Erreà	Visitroseto.it
Segafredo Virtus Bologna	(Italy) Alessandro Ramagli	(Italy) Andrea Michelori	Macron	Segafredo Zanetti
Tezenis Verona	(Italy) Luca Dalmonte	(Italy) Giorgio Boscagin	Erreà	Tezenis
Unieuro Forlì	(Italy) Giorgio Valli	(Italy) Matteo Frassineti	Erreà	Unieuro

==== West ====
Team	Head coach	Captain	Kit manufacturer	Shirt sponsor
Angelico Biella	(Italy) Michele Carrea	(Italy) Niccolò De Vico	Erreà	Angelico
Basket Agropoli	(Italy) Alessandro Finelli	(Italy) Riccardo Santolamazza	Givova	
Benacquista Latina	(Italy) Franco Gramenzi	(Italy) Lorenzo Uglietti	Joma	Benacquista Assicurazioni
FMC Ferentino	(Italy) Riccardo Paolini	(Italy) Angelo Gigli	Erreà	FMC
Givova Scafati	(Italy) Giovanni Perdichizzi	(Italy) Tommaso Fantoni	Givova	Givova
Lighthouse Trapani	(Italy) Ugo Ducarello	(Argentina) Demián Filloy	Eyesportwear	Lighthouse
Mens Sana Siena	(Italy) Giulio Griccioli	(Italy) Simone Flamini	Macron	Soundreef
Moncada Agrigento	(Italy) Franco Ciani	(Argentina) Albano Maximo Chiarastella	Erreà	Moncada Energy Group
Novipiù Casale Monferrato	(Italy) Marco Ramondino	(Italy) Niccolò Martinoni	Macron	Novipiù
NPC Rieti	(Italy) Luciano Nunzi	(Italy) Nicolò Benedusi	Joma	
Orsi Tortona	(Italy) Demis Cavina	(Italy) Luca Garri	Erreà	ORSI
Remer Treviglio	(Italy) Adriano Vertemati	(Italy) Emanuele Rossi		Gruppo Remer
Roma Gas & Power Roma	(Italy) Davide Bonora	(Italy) Daniele Bonessio	Spalding	Roma Gas & Power
TWS Legnano	(Italy) Mattia Ferrari	(Italy) Federico Maiocco	Bitre Sport	T.W.S.
UniCusano Roma	(Italy) Fabio Corbani	(Italy) Giuliano Maresca	Eyesportwear	Università Niccolò Cusano
Viola Reggio Calabria	(Italy) Antonio Paternoster	(Argentina) Agustin Fabi	Bitre Sport	

== Regular season ==
=== East Group league table ===
Pos	Team	Pld	W	L	PF	PA	PR	Pts	Qualification or relegation
1	De' Longhi Treviso	30	21	9	2102	1987	1.058	42	Qualification to Playoffs
2	Segafredo Virtus Bologna	30	21	9	2450	2216	1.106	42	Qualification to Playoffs
3	Alma Trieste	30	21	9	2355	2139	1.101	42	Qualification to Playoffs
4	OraSì Ravenna	30	19	11	2311	2230	1.036	38	Qualification to Playoffs
5	Kontatto Bologna	30	18	12	2269	2198	1.032	36	Qualification to Playoffs
6	Roseto Sharks	30	17	13	2351	2340	1.005	34	Qualification to Playoffs
7	Dinamica Mantova	30	17	13	2389	2307	1.036	34	Qualification to Playoffs
8	Tezenis Verona	30	17	13	2199	2105	1.045	34	Qualification to Playoffs
9	G.S.A. Udine	30	16	14	2193	2176	1.008	32	
10	Assigeco Piacenza	30	12	18	2184	2289	0.954	24	
11	Aurora Basket Jesi	30	12	18	2391	2460	0.972	24	
12	Bondi Ferrara	30	12	18	2360	2441	0.967	24	
13	Andrea Costa Imola	30	11	19	2271	2394	0.949	22	
14	Proger Chieti	30	10	20	2291	2426	0.944	20	Qualification to Relegation play-out
15	Unieuro Forlì	30	9	21	2153	2313	0.931	18	Qualification to Relegation play-out
16	Ambalt Recanati	30	7	23	2217	2465	0.899	14	Relegation to Serie B

Updated to match(es) played on 23 April 2017. Source: Lega Pallacanestro

=== West Group league table ===
Pos	Team	Pld	W	L	PF	PA	PR	Pts	Qualification or relegation
1	Angelico Biella	30	24	6	2468	2277	1.084	48	Qualification to Playoffs
2	Orsi Tortona	30	21	9	2362	2266	1.042	42	Qualification to Playoffs
3	Europromotion Legnano	30	19	11	2252	2186	1.030	38	Qualification to Playoffs
4	Moncada Agrigento	30	17	13	2238	2198	1.018	34	Qualification to Playoffs
5	UniCusano Roma	30	17	13	2659	2588	1.027	34	Qualification to Playoffs
6	Remer Treviglio	30	16	14	2455	2396	1.025	32	Qualification to Playoffs
7	Novipiù Casale Monferrato	30	16	14	2163	2068	1.046	32	Qualification to Playoffs
8	Lighthouse Trapani	30	15	15	2369	2380	0.995	30	Qualification to Playoffs
9	Benacquista Assicurazioni Latina	30	15	15	2377	2363	1.006	30	
10	Roma Gas & Power Roma	30	14	16	2279	2345	0.972	28	
11	Mens Sana Siena	30	14	16	2193	2270	0.966	28	
12	NPC Rieti	30	13	17	2327	2305	1.010	26	
13	FMC Ferentino	30	12	18	2321	2357	0.985	24	
14	Givova Scafati	30	11	19	2377	2366	1.005	22	Qualification to Relegation play-out
15	Viola Reggio Calabria	30	9	21	2251	2426	0.928	18	Qualification to Relegation play-out
16	Basket Agropoli	30	7	23	2104	2404	0.875	14	Relegation to Serie B

Updated to match(es) played on 23 April 2017. Source: Lega Pallacanestro

== Coppa Italia ==
At the half of the league, the four first teams of each group in the table play the LNP Cup, known as Turkish Airlines Cup for sponsorship reasons, at the Unipol Arena in Bologna, from 3 to 5 March 2017.

=== Bracket ===
Quarter-finals; 3 March 2017
1W	Angelico Biella	86
4E	Dinamica Generale Mantova	78
2E	De' Longhi Treviso	73
3W	UniCusano Roma	72
2W	TWS Legnano	55
3E	Alma Trieste	84
1E	Segafredo Virtus Bologna	95
4W	Moncada Agrigento	63

Semifinals; 4 March 2017
1W	Angelico Biella	89
2E	De' Longhi Treviso	81
3E	Alma Trieste	74
1E	Segafredo Virtus Bologna	86

Final; 5 March 2017
1W	Angelico Biella	68
1E	Segafredo Virtus Bologna	69

== Playout ==
The league play-out are played between the 14th and 15th placed teams of each group in two elimination rounds. The series will be played in a best-of-five format: the first, the second and the eventual fifth game will be played at home of the team that got the better ranking at the end of the regular season, the third and the eventual fourth will be played at home the lower ranked team.

All matches will be played between 30 April and 24 May 2017 (eventual Game 5).

Semifinals
14E	Proger Chieti	1
15W	Viola Reggio Calabria	3
14W	Givova Scafati	3
15E	Unieuro Forlì	2

Finals
14E	Proger Chieti	1
15E	Unieuro Forlì	3

== Playoffs ==
The league's playoffs are played between the first and the eighth of each group in four rounds: eightfinals, quarterfinals, semifinals and final. All series are played in a best-of-five format: the first, the second and the eventual fifth match will be played at home of the best-placed team, the second, the third and the fourth, at the end of the regular season.

All matches are played between 30 April and 21 June 2017 (eventual Game 5).

First round
1W	Angelico Biella	2
8E	Tezenis Verona	3
4E	OraSì Ravenna	3
5W	UniCusano Roma	1
3W	Europromotion Legnano	1
6E	Roseto Sharks	3
2E	Segafredo Virtus Bologna	3
7W	Novipiù Casale Monferrato	1
1E	De' Longhi Treviso	3
8W	Lighthouse Trapani	0
4W	Moncada Agrigento	1
5E	Kontatto Bologna	3
3E	Alma Trieste	3
6W	Remer Treviglio	2
2W	Orsi Tortona	3
7E	Dinamica Mantova	2

Quarter-finals
8E	Tezenis Verona	0
4E	OraSì Ravenna	3
6E	Roseto Sharks	1
2E	Segafredo Virtus Bologna	3
1E	De' Longhi Treviso	1
5E	Kontatto Bologna	3
3E	Alma Trieste	3
2W	Orsi Tortona	1

Semi-finals
4E	OraSì Ravenna	0
2E	Segafredo Virtus Bologna	3
5E	Kontatto Bologna	2
3E	Alma Trieste	3

Final
2E	Segafredo Virtus Bologna	3
3E	Alma Trieste	0

Source: LNP

== Sponsors ==
- Citroën (title sponsor)
- FXCM (main sponsor)
- Molten (official ball)
- Adidas
- Novi
- Oiko
- Dalla Riva Sportfloors
- Sportsystem
- Vivaticket
- Spalding
- Gruppo Italtelo
- Iredem
- Panorama
- Best Union Company
- OpenSky
- Sicur Green System
