= 2015–16 Serie A2 Basket =

42nd season of the Italian basketball second league Serie A2 Basket

Serie A2 Basket
- Season: 2015–16
- Duration: 4 October 2015 – June 2016
- Games played: 480 (Regular season); 45–75 (Playoffs)
- Teams: 32
- TV partner(s): Sky Italia

Regular season
- Top seed: De' Longhi Treviso
- Promoted: Centrale del Latte Brescia
- Relegated: Paffoni Omegna; Bawer Matera; Basket Barcellona

Finals
- Champions: Centrale del Latte Brescia
- Runners-up: Fortitudo Bologna
- Semifinalists: De' Longhi Treviso; Givova Scafati
- Finals MVP: (United States) Damian Hollis

Statistical leaders
| Points | (United States) Bryon Allen | 23.2 |
| Rebounds | (United States) Mike Hall | 13.0 |
| Assists | (Italy) Matteo Fantinelli | 6.5 |
| Index Rating | (Italy) Marc Trasolini | 24.6 |

Records
- Highest scoring: Casalpusterlengo 102–101 Latina (23 April 2016)
- All statistics correct as of 15 June 2016.

The 2015–16 Serie A2 season, known for sponsorship reasons as the Serie A2 Citroën, was the 42nd season of the Italian basketball second league Serie A2 Basket. The season started on October 4, 2015 and ended on June 23, 2016 with the last game of the promotion playoffs finals.

== Rules ==
The season is composed of 32 teams with a regional subdivision in two equal groups of sixteen, East and West. Each team plays the others in its subgroup twice, the first ranked team of each group then plays the eighth ranked team of the other group (e.g. East #1 against West #8), then the second best against the seventh, and so on, to form a promotion playoffs (for one place) of sixteen teams.

== Teams ==
=== Groups ===
| West Group | | East Group | |
| Team | City | Team | City |
|---|---|---|---|
| Acea Roma | Rome | Andrea Costa Imola | Imola |
| Angelico Biella | Biella | Aurora Jesi | Iesi |
| Assigeco Casalpusterlengo | Casalpusterlengo | Basket Recanati | Recanati |
| Basket Agropoli | Agropoli | Bawer Matera | Matera |
| Basket Barcellona | Barcellona Pozzo di Gotto | Bondi Ferrara | Ferrara |
| Basket Ferentino | Ferentino | Centrale del Latte Brescia | Brescia |
| Benacquista Latina | Latina, Lazio | De’ Longhi Treviso | Treviso |
| Bermè Reggio Calabria | Reggio Calabria | Dinamica Mantova | Mantua |
| Givova Scafati | Scafati | Fortitudo Bologna | Bologna |
| Lighthouse Trapani | Trapani | Legnano Knights | Legnano |
| Mens Sana Basket Siena | Siena | OraSì Ravenna | Ravenna |
| Moncada Agrigento | Agrigento | Pallacanestro Trieste 2004 | Trieste |
| Novipiù Casale Monferrato | Casale Monferrato | Proger Chieti | Chieti |
| NPC Rieti | Rieti | Remer Treviglio | Treviglio |
| Orsi Tortona | Tortona | Roseto Sharks | Roseto degli Abruzzi |
| Paffoni Omegna | Omegna | Tezenis Verona | Verona |

=== Number of teams by region ===
| Number of teams | Region | Team(s) |
|---|---|---|
| 5 | Lombardy | Legnano Knights, Assigeco Casalpusterlengo, Centrale del Latte Brescia, Dinamica Mantova and Remer Treviglio |
| 4 | Emilia-Romagna | Fortitudo Bologna, Andrea Costa Imola, OraSì Ravenna and Bondi Ferrara |
| 4 | Lazio | Acea Roma, Benacquista Latina, NPC Rieti and Basket Ferentino |
| 4 | Piedmont | Angelico Biella, Orsi Tortona, Novipiù Casale Monferrato and Paffoni Omegna |
| 3 | Sicily | Lighthouse Trapani, Basket Barcellona and Moncada Agrigento |
| 2 | Abruzzo | Proger Chieti and Roseto Sharks |
| 2 | Campania | Givova Scafati and Basket Agropoli |
| 2 | Marche | Basket Recanati and Aurora Jesi |
| 2 | Veneto | De’ Longhi Treviso and Tezenis Verona |
1
| 1 | Basilicata | Bawer Matera |
| 1 | Calabria | Bermè Reggio Calabria |
| 1 | Friuli | Pallacanestro Trieste 2004 |
| 1 | Tuscany | Mens Sana Basket Siena |

=== Venues and locations ===
Lega Basket Serie A 2015–16 – Club Locations

| Team | Home city | Arena | Capacity |
|---|---|---|---|
| Acea Roma | Roma | Palazzetto dello Sport | 3,500 |
| Andrea Costa Imola | Imola | PalaRuggi | 2,000 |
| Angelico Biella | Biella | BiellaForum | 5,707 |
| Assigeco Casalpusterlengo | Casalpusterlengo | Campus in Codogno | 1,000 |
| Aurora Jesi | Jesi | UBI BPA Sport Center | 3,500 |
| Basket Agropoli | Agropoli | PalaDiConcilio | 1,500 |
| Basket Barcellona | Barcellona Pozzo di Gotto | PalaAlberti | 3,000 |
| Basket Ferentino | Ferentino | Palazzetto Ponte Grande | 2,000 |
| Basket Recanati | Recanati | PalaCingolani | 1,006 |
| Bawer Matera | Matera | PalaSassi | 2,000 |
| Benacquista Latina | Latina | PalaBianchini | 2,500 |
| Bermé Reggio Calabria | Reggio Calabria | PalaCalafiore | 8,500 |
| Bondi Ferrara | Ferrara | Pala Hilton Pharma | 3,504 |
| Centrale del Latte Brescia | Brescia | Pala San Filippo; PalaGeorge (in Montichiari) | 2,500; 5,500 |
| De' Longhi Treviso | Treviso | PalaVerde | 5,134 |
| Dinamica Mantova | Mantova | PalaBam | 5,000 |
| Fortitudo Bologna | Bologna | Land Rover Arena | 5,721 |
| Givova Scafati | Scafati | PalaMagnano | 3,700 |
| Legnano Knights | Legnano | Knights Palace | 1,650 |
| Lighthouse Trapani | Trapani | Palallio | 4,575 |
| Mens Sana Siena | Siena | Palasport Mens Sana | 7,050 |
| Moncada Agrigento | Agrigento | PalaMoncada | 3,200 |
| Novipiù Casale Monferrato | Casale Monferrato | PalaFerraris | 3,508 |
| NPC Rieti | Rieti | PalaSojourner | 3,550 |
| OraSì Ravenna | Ravenna | PalaDeAndré | 3,500 |
| Orsi Tortona | Tortona | PalaOltrepò | 1,500 |
| Paffoni Omegna | Omegna | PalaBattisti | 1,048 |
| Pallacanestro Trieste | Trieste | PalaTrieste | 6,943 |
| Proger Chieti | Chieti | PalaTricalle Sandro Leombroni | 2,600 |
| Remer Treviglio | Treviglio | PalaFacchetti | 2,880 |
| Roseto Sharks | Roseto | PalaMaggetti | 5,000 |
| Tezenis Verona | Verona | PalaOlimpia | 5,350 |

== Regular season ==
=== East Group ===
==== League table ====
| Pos | Team | Pld | W | L | PF | PA | PR | Pts | Qualification or relegation |
|---|---|---|---|---|---|---|---|---|---|
| 1 | De' Longhi Treviso | 30 | 22 | 8 | 2292 | 2094 | 1.095 | 44 | Qualification to playoffs |
| 2 | Centrale del Latte Brescia | 30 | 21 | 9 | 2359 | 2247 | 1.050 | 42 | Qualification to playoffs |
| 3 | Dinamica Mantova | 30 | 21 | 9 | 2313 | 2209 | 1.047 | 42 | Qualification to playoffs |
| 4 | Andrea Costa Imola | 30 | 19 | 11 | 2281 | 2236 | 1.020 | 38 | Qualification to playoffs |
| 5 | Roseto Sharks | 30 | 19 | 11 | 2540 | 2411 | 1.054 | 38 | Qualification to playoffs |
| 6 | Pallacanestro Trieste | 30 | 18 | 12 | 2318 | 2207 | 1.050 | 36 | Qualification to playoffs |
| 7 | Fortitudo Bologna | 30 | 18 | 12 | 2273 | 2133 | 1.066 | 36 | Qualification to playoffs |
| 8 | Tezenis Verona | 30 | 16 | 14 | 2086 | 1954 | 1.068 | 32 | Qualification to playoffs |
| 9 | OraSì Ravenna | 30 | 16 | 14 | 2213 | 2169 | 1.020 | 32 | |
| 10 | Remer Treviglio | 30 | 15 | 15 | 2298 | 2281 | 1.007 | 30 | |
| 11 | Bondi Ferrara | 30 | 14 | 16 | 2312 | 2323 | 0.995 | 28 | |
| 12 | Proger Chieti | 30 | 12 | 18 | 2157 | 2189 | 0.985 | 24 | |
| 13 | Legnano Knights | 30 | 10 | 20 | 2212 | 2348 | 0.942 | 20 | |
| 14 | Aurora Jesi | 30 | 8 | 22 | 2161 | 2434 | 0.888 | 16 | Qualification to relegation playoffs |
| 15 | Basket Recanati | 30 | 8 | 22 | 2238 | 2337 | 0.958 | 16 | Qualification to relegation playoffs |
| 16 | Bawer Matera | 30 | 3 | 27 | 2139 | 2620 | 0.816 | 6 | Relegation to Serie B |

Updated to match(es) played on 04 May 2016. Source: Legapallacanestro

==== Results ====
Day one
| 04-10-15 | | 06-01-16 |
| 72-83 | Roseto-Treviso | 73-87 |
| 69-79 | Ravenna-Ferrara | 88-86 |
| 64-67 | Bologna-Mantova | 75-77 |
| 73-82 | Legnano-Brescia | 74-102 |
| 85-73 | Matera-Treviglio | 59-107 |
| 69-74 | Recanati-Imola | 64-84 |
| 82-77 | Chieti-Jesi | 76-71 |
| 39-68 | Trieste-Verona | 62-79 |

Day four
| 25-10-15 | | 31-01-16 |
| 67-72 | Verona-Legnano | 57-48 |
| 85-72 | Imola-Chieti | 72-69 |
| 68-78 | Ferrara-Treviso | 81-85 |
| 88-60 | Trieste-Bologna | 74-72 |
| 82-76 | Jesi-Matera | 77-74 |
| 67-60 | Brescia-Ravenna | 82-76 |
| 75-77 | Mantova-Roseto | 84-81 |
| 77-72 | Treviglio-Recanati | 84-75 |

Day seven
| 12-11-15 | | 17-02-16 |
| 71-59 | Matera-Bologna | 50-94 |
| 63-70 | Treviso-Imola | 81-85 |
| 67-78 | Treviglio-Mantova | 73-83 |
| 89-68 | Chieti-Trieste | 68-82 |
| 65-80 | Ravenna-Recanati | 66-50 |
| 61-59 | Brescia-Verona | 49-73 |
| 82-61 | Ferrara-Jesi | 74-63 |
| 100-85 | Roseto-Legnano | 95-84 |

Day ten
| 29-11-15 | | 13-03-16 |
| 80-81 | Trieste-Brescia | 59-80 |
| 87-72 | Imola-Treviglio | 80-84 |
| 90-68 | Roseto-Matera | 105-85 |
| 77-79 | Recanati-Verona | 83-74 |
| 65-80 | Chieti-Treviso | 50-84 |
| 82-103 | Mantova-Ferrara | 77-68 |
| 75-60 | Bologna-Ravenna | 66-74 |
| 88-69 | Legnano-Jesi | 77-74 |

Day thirteen
| 20-12-15 | | 10-04-16 |
| 88-70 | Ferrara-Matera | 88-82 |
| 91-87 | Treviso-Mantova | 68-70 |
| 93-82 | Ravenna-Roseto | 70-85 |
| 93-87 | Treviglio-Brescia | 63-76 |
| 85-81 | Imola-Legnano | 60-74 |
| 57-63 | Recanati-Bologna | 77-99 |
| 75-70 | Jesi-Trieste | 64-83 |
| 63-73 | Chieti-Verona | 74-78 |

Day two
| 11-10-15 | | 17-01-16 |
| 71-79 | Jesi-Ravenna | 66-82 |
| 74-66 | Treviso-Recanati | 88-74 |
| 75-55 | Verona-Roseto | 74-91 |
| 103-87 | Brescia-Matera | 96-85 |
| 90-83 | Mantova-Trieste | 66-76 |
| 77-88 | Ferrara-Legnano | 85-77 |
| 93-87 | Imola-Bologna | 81-86 |
| 60-53 | Treviglio-Chieti | 69-79 |

Day five
| 01-11-15 | | 07-02-16 |
| 99-92 | Ferrara-Treviglio | 76-68 |
| 72-64 | Treviso-Jesi | 91-68 |
| 75-90 | Matera-Mantova | 60-92 |
| 88-94 | Roseto-Imola | 78-74 |
| 59-68 | Ravenna-Verona | 51-63 |
| 70-73 | Chieti-Brescia | 92-77 |
| 71-67 | Recanati-Trieste | 86-88 |
| 93-71 | Bologna-Legnano | 76-67 |

Day eight
| 15-11-15 | | 21-02-16 |
| 58-72 | Imola-Brescia | 59-66 |
| 68-57 | Roseto-Chieti | 83-81 |
| 81-92 | Legnano-Ravenna | 62-69 |
| 66-68 | Verona-Treviglio | 62-74 |
| 90-61 | Mantova-Jesi | 69-70 |
| 87-76 | Trieste-Ferrara | 83-74 |
| 93-75 | Recanati-Matera | 91-62 |
| 85-78 | Bologna-Treviso | 55-62 |

Day eleven
| 06-12-15 | | 20-03-16 |
| 85-108 | Jesi-Roseto | 70-96 |
| 63-69 | Treviso-Legnano | 74-65 |
| 81-65 | Treviglio-Bologna | 57-74 |
| 74-75 | Ferrara-Imola | 70-76 |
| 62-68 | Matera-Verona | 67-96 |
| 62-69 | Chieti-Recanati | 70-80 |
| 58-61 | Ravenna-Trieste | 68-74 |
| 74-69 | Brescia-Mantova | 80-84 |

Day fourteen
| 27-12-15 | | 17-04-16 |
| 77-55 | Treviso-Treviglio | 70-69 |
| 74-68 | Bologna-Ferrara | 67-61 |
| 71-79 | Verona-Imola | 62-75 |
| 75-69 | Mantova-Ravenna | 62-77 |
| 59-89 | Matera-Chieti | 60-87 |
| 88-73 | Roseto-Recanati | 90-82 |
| 92-80 | Brescia-Jesi | 84-61 |
| 85-87 | Legnano-Trieste | 54-80 |

Day three
| 18-10-15 | | 24-01-16 |
| 72-79 | Recanati-Jesi | 83-86 |
| 82-64 | Chieti-Ferrara | 65-78 |
| 88-74 | Roseto-Brescia | 95-77 |
| 62-67 | Legnano-Mantova | 73-84 |
| 77-69 | Bologna-Verona | 70-60 |
| 84-80 | Ravenna-Treviglio | 74-76 |
| 87-53 | Trieste-Imola | 77-81 |
| 75-91 | Matera-Treviso | 66-83 |

Day six
| 08-11-15 | | 14-02-16 |
| 76-70 | Trieste-Matera | 83-84 |
| 78-84 | Brescia-Treviso | 87-93 |
| 75-55 | Verona-Ferrara | 57-59 |
| 73-65 | Bologna-Roseto | 72-77 |
| 77-71 | Jesi-Treviglio | 65-81 |
| 73-74 | Imola-Ravenna | 84-96 |
| 80-72 | Mantova-Chieti | 84-79 |
| 85-76 | Legnano-Recanati | 76-74 |

Day nine
| 22-11-15 | | 28-02-16 |
| 69-55 | Treviso-Trieste | 66-82 |
| 73-85 | Matera-Legnano | 71-77 |
| 74-71 | Brescia-Bologna | 75-86 |
| 86-55 | Verona-Mantova | 59-60 |
| 83-76 | Ferrara-Recanati | 82-73 |
| 68-64 | Ravenna-Chieti | 68-74 |
| 69-73 | Treviglio-Roseto | 94-91 |
| 73-75 | Jesi-Imola | 64-72 |

Day twelve
| 13-12-15 | | 03-04-16 |
| 79-87 | Matera-Ravenna | 70-96 |
| 64-68 | Trieste-Treviglio | 101-93 |
| 67-57 | Verona-Treviso | 52-66 |
| 86-75 | Bologna-Jesi | 100-87 |
| 78-68 | Mantova-Imola | 64-55 |
| 57-62 | Legnano-Chieti | 73-74 |
| 66-70 | Recanati-Brescia | 66-73 |
| 101-84 | Roseto-Ferrara | 85-87 |

Day fifteen
| 03-01-16 | | 23-04-16 |
| 103-71 | Trieste-Roseto | 99-88 |
| 77-73 | Jesi-Verona | 69-76 |
| 73-79 | Ferrara-Brescia | 70-88 |
| 81-66 | Ravenna-Treviso | 60-68 |
| 86-61 | Imola-Matera | 88-78 |
| 76-67 | Chieti-Bologna | 61-82 |
| 86-62 | Treviglio-Legnano | 94-87 |
| 77-96 | Recanati-Mantova | 86-78 |

=== West Group ===
==== League table ====
| Pos | Team | Pld | W | L | PF | PA | PR | Pts | Qualification or relegation |
|---|---|---|---|---|---|---|---|---|---|
| 1 | Givova Scafati | 30 | 20 | 10 | 2364 | 2199 | 1.075 | 40 | Qualification to playoffs |
| 2 | Basket Agropoli | 30 | 19 | 11 | 2425 | 2430 | 0.998 | 38 | Qualification to playoffs |
| 3 | Orsi Tortona | 30 | 19 | 11 | 2266 | 2174 | 1.042 | 38 | Qualification to playoffs |
| 4 | Basket Ferentino | 30 | 18 | 12 | 2301 | 2209 | 1.042 | 36 | Qualification to playoffs |
| 5 | Mens Sana Siena | 30 | 18 | 12 | 2361 | 2320 | 1.018 | 36 | Qualification to playoffs |
| 6 | Moncada Agrigento | 30 | 17 | 13 | 2328 | 2274 | 1.024 | 34 | Qualification to playoffs |
| 7 | Lighthouse Trapani | 30 | 16 | 14 | 2521 | 2406 | 1.048 | 32 | Qualification to playoffs |
| 8 | Novipiù Casale Monferrato | 30 | 15 | 15 | 2109 | 2041 | 1.033 | 30 | Qualification to playoffs |
| 9 | Bermè Reggio Calabria | 30 | 14 | 16 | 2222 | 2232 | 0.996 | 28 | |
| 10 | Angelico Biella | 30 | 14 | 16 | 2247 | 2334 | 0.963 | 28 | |
| 11 | Assigeco Casalpusterlengo | 30 | 13 | 17 | 2372 | 2455 | 0.966 | 26 | |
| 12 | Benacquista Latina | 30 | 13 | 17 | 2357 | 2380 | 0.990 | 26 | |
| 13 | NPC Rieti | 30 | 13 | 17 | 2158 | 2263 | 0.954 | 26 | |
| 14 | Acea Roma | 30 | 13 | 17 | 2266 | 2238 | 1.013 | 26 | Qualification to relegation playoffs |
| 15 | Paffoni Omegna | 30 | 12 | 18 | 2335 | 2401 | 0.973 | 24 | Qualification to relegation playoffs |
| 16 | Basket Barcellona | 30 | 6 | 24 | 2158 | 2434 | 0.887 | 12 | Relegation to Serie B |

Updated to match(es) played on 04 May 2016. Source: Legapallacanestro

==== Results ====
Day one
| 04-10-15 | | 06-01-16 |
| 89-87 | Agropoli-Barcellona | 80-86 |
| 97-78 | Trapani-Omegna | 85-88 |
| 68-77 | Casalpusterlengo-Scafati | 71-83 |
| 57-64 | Roma-Tortona | 52-68 |
| 70-83 | Rieti-Ferentino | 65-77 |
| 61-62 | Reggio Calabria-Casale | 66-64 |
| 68-82 | Biella-Agrigento | 84-81 |
| 80-73 | Siena-Latina | 89-85 |

Day four
| 25-10-15 | | 31-01-16 |
| 91-79 | Ferentino-Reggio Calabria | 76-79 |
| 86-80 | Agrigento-Tortona | 74-64 |
| 70-67 | Barcellona-Siena | 91-98 |
| 69-51 | Casale-Omegna | 74-63 |
| 92-96 | Casalpusterlengo-Agropoli | 82-90 |
| 79-69 | Latina-Biella | 71-74 |
| 88-74 | Scafati-Trapani | 77-74 |
| 75-64 | Rieti-Roma | 63-88 |

Day seven
| 12-11-15 | | 17-02-16 |
| 79-75 | Biella-Agropoli | 68-79 |
| 93-65 | Scafati-Latina | 98-83 |
| 99-74 | Trapani-Casalpusterlengo | 72-61 |
| 80-74 | Omegna-Siena | 91-80 |
| 88-67 | Casale-Rieti | 65-67 |
| 78-80 | Agrigento-Ferentino | 73-82 |
| 83-96 | Reggio Calabria-Roma | 73-80 |
| 86-78 | Tortona-Barcellona | 66-65 |

Day ten
| 29-11-15 | | 13-03-16 |
| 85-90 | Latina-Agrigento | 94-67 |
| 92-72 | Scafati-Tortona | 91-96 |
| 98-82 | Trapani-Biella | 83-88 |
| 52-73 | Ferentino-Casale | 69-81 |
| 78-73 | Rieti-Barcellona | 75-77 |
| 87-84 | Roma-Omegna | 87-75 |
| 58-77 | Casalpusterlengo-Reggio Calabria | 78-84 |
| 103-88 | Siena-Agropoli | 80-73 |

Day thirteen
| 20-12-15 | | 10-04-16 |
| 79-86 | Roma-Latina | 85-90 |
| 81-75 | Ferentino-Omegna | 74-75 |
| 87-85 | Casalpusterlengo-Siena | 91-99 |
| 82-67 | Agropoli-Casale | 82-80 |
| 73-83 | Barcellona-Scafati | 78-89 |
| 76-70 | Agrigento-Reggio Calabria | 69-82 |
| 90-84 | Biella-Tortona | 72-87 |
| 59-81 | Rieti-Trapani | 74-73 |

Day two
| 11-10-15 | | 17-01-16 |
| 85-64 | Tortona-Trapani | 76-84 |
| 79-76 | Latina-Rieti | 66-74 |
| 81-77 | Scafati-Siena | 63-75 |
| 78-87 | Barcellona-Casalpusterlengo | 74-72 |
| 74-70 | Ferentino-Roma | 73-61 |
| 67-78 | Omegna-Reggio Calabria | 80-85 |
| 75-62 | Casale-Biella | 61-80 |
| 82-83 | Agrigento-Agropoli | 82-85 |

Day five
| 01-11-15 | | 07-02-16 |
| 62-79 | Agropoli-Rieti | 88-80 |
| 78-69 | Agrigento-Barcellona | 81-62 |
| 87-73 | Trapani-Siena | 79-93 |
| 74-75 | Omegna-Scafati | 70-89 |
| 63-72 | Tortona-Casale | 60-56 |
| 74-69 | Biella-Ferentino | 57-78 |
| 62-81 | Reggio Calabria-Latina | 72-78 |
| 90-94 | Roma-Casalpusterlengo | 89-94 |

Day eight
| 15-11-15 | | 21-02-16 |
| 85-66 | Casalpusterlengo-Omegna | 83-82 |
| 71-63 | Latina-Casale | 64-70 |
| 100-88 | Agropoli-Scafati | 81-76 |
| 80-63 | Ferentino-Barcellona | 78-71 |
| 59-71 | Rieti-Agrigento | 72-84 |
| 68-70 | Siena-Tortona | 65-85 |
| 89-81 | Trapani-Reggio Calabria | 61-74 |
| 83-77 | Roma-Biella | 71-75 |

Day eleven
| 06-12-15 | | 20-03-16 |
| 79-80 | Omegna-Rieti | 63-65 |
| 63-73 | Biella-Scafati | 72-67 |
| 66-50 | Tortona-Reggio Calabria | 79-66 |
| 95-85 | Agropoli-Trapani | 82-91 |
| 77-79 | Ferentino-Casalpusterlengo | 77-64 |
| 91-75 | Barcellona-Latina | 55-79 |
| 73-68 | Agrigento-Casale | 87-59 |
| 68-50 | Roma-Siena | 76-77 |

Day fourteen
| 27-12-15 | | 17-04-16 |
| 77-68 | Siena-Ferentino | 61-83 |
| 86-94 | Trapani-Agrigento | 79-69 |
| 90-73 | Latina-Agropoli | 78-84 |
| 73-69 | Omegna-Biella | 91-77 |
| 82-63 | Reggio Calabria-Barcellona | 90-67 |
| 73-60 | Tortona-Rieti | 78-81 |
| 71-66 | Casale-Casalpusterlengo | 80-71 |
| 70-80 | Scafati-Roma | 57-72 |

Day three
| 18-10-15 | | 24-01-16 |
| 89-84 | Trapani-Latina | 75-81 |
| 76-74 | Agropoli-Ferentino | 70-87 |
| 52-67 | Roma-Agrigento | 93-99 |
| 91-70 | Tortona-Omegna | 86-81 |
| 84-80 | Rieti-Casalpusterlengo | 77-79 |
| 68-60 | Siena-Casale | 80-77 |
| 81-70 | Reggio Calabria-Scafati | 64-73 |
| 70-77 | Biella-Barcellona | 77-64 |

Day six
| 08-11-15 | | 14-02-16 |
| 80-79 | Rieti-Biella | 73-77 |
| 83-76 | Casalpusterlengo-Agrigento | 78-77 |
| 76-69 | Siena-Reggio Calabria | 78-72 |
| 66-73 | Casale-Scafati | 67-96 |
| 103-99 | Ferentino-Trapani | 93-90 |
| 85-77 | Latina-Tortona | 62-74 |
| 69-68 | Agropoli-Roma | 55-93 |
| 61-73 | Barcellona-Omegna | 82-85 |

Day nine
| 22-11-15 | | 28-02-16 |
| 66-64 | Tortona-Ferentino | 76-77 |
| 59-77 | Agrigento-Siena | 77-84 |
| 72-58 | Scafati-Rieti | 77-70 |
| 66-80 | Barcellona-Roma | 68-71 |
| 77-71 | Biella-Casalpusterlengo | 73-64 |
| 77-85 | Reggio Calabria-Agropoli | 60-75 |
| 90-72 | Omegna-Latina | 90-78 |
| 72-66 | Casale-Trapani | 67-83 |

Day twelve
| 13-12-15 | | 03-04-16 |
| 70-72 | Scafati-Agrigento | 73-75 |
| 73-61 | Latina-Ferentino | 74-92 |
| 96-89 | Casalpusterlengo-Tortona | 76-77 |
| 82-69 | Reggio Calabria-Biella | 79-78 |
| 95-50 | Casale-Barcellona | 71-60 |
| 98-93 | Omegna-Agropoli | 90-95 |
| 96-74 | Trapani-Roma | 83-82 |
| 82-81 | Siena-Rieti | 61-69 |

Day fifteen
| 03-01-16 | | 23-04-16 |
| 68-59 | Rieti-Reggio Calabria | 79-85 |
| 73-74 | Agropoli-Tortona | 67-54 |
| 91-85 | Biella-Siena | 76-99 |
| 60-53 | Roma-Casale | 58-80 |
| 75-74 | Agrigento-Omegna | 74-79 |
| 64-69 | Ferentino-Scafati | 64-91 |
| 86-75 | Casalpusterlengo-Latina | 102-101 |
| 70-91 | Barcellona-Trapani | 89-108 |

== Coppa Italia ==
At the half of the league, the four first teams of each group in the table play the Final Eight of the LNP Cup at a neutral venue the Federation propose. The LNP Cup Final Eight was played from March 4 to 6, 2016.

=== Bracket ===
Quarter-finals
1W | Moncada Agrigento | 69
4E | Dinamica Mantova | 79
2E | Andrea Costa Imola | 71
3W | Basket Agropoli | 76
2W | Givova Scafati | 56
3E | De' Longhi Treviso | 53
4W | Novipiù Casale Monferrato | 84
1E | Centrale del Latte Brescia | 65

Semifinals
4E | Dinamica Mantova | 76
3W | Basket Agropoli | 75
2W | Givova Scafati | 69
4W | Novipiù Casale Monferrato | 67

Final
4E | Dinamica Mantova | 62
2W | Givova Scafati | 72

== Playout ==
As of 20 May 2016

Semifinals
14E | Aurora Jesi | 3
15W | Paffoni Omegna | 2
14W | Acea Roma | 1
15E | Basket Recanati | 3

Finals
15W | Paffoni Omegna | 0
14W | Acea Roma | 3

== Playoffs ==
As of 24 June 2016

First round
1E | De' Longhi Treviso | 3
8W | Novipiù Casale Monferrato | 2
4W | Basket Ferentino | 3
5E | Roseto Sharks | 2
3E | Dinamica Mantova | 1
6W | Moncada Agrigento | 3
2W | Basket Agropoli | 1
7E | Fortitudo Bologna | 3
1W | Givova Scafati | 3
8E | Tezenis Verona | 0
4E | Andrea Costa Imola | 3
5W | Mens Sana Siena | 2
2E | Centrale del Latte Brescia | 3
7W | Lighthouse Trapani | 2
3W | Orsi Tortona | 3
6E | Pallacanestro Trieste | 2

Quarter-finals
1E | De' Longhi Treviso | 3
4W | Basket Ferentino | 2
6W | Moncada Agrigento | 0
7E | Fortitudo Bologna | 3
1W | Givova Scafati | 3
4E | Andrea Costa Imola | 1
2E | Centrale del Latte Brescia | 3
3W | Orsi Tortona | 2

Semi-finals
1E | De' Longhi Treviso | 1
7E | Fortitudo Bologna | 3
1W | Givova Scafati | 2
2E | Centrale del Latte Brescia | 3

Final
7E | Fortitudo Bologna | 2
2E | Centrale del Latte Brescia | 3

== Statistical leaders ==
=== Points ===
| Rank | Name | Team | PPG |
|---|---|---|---|
| 1. | (United States) Bryon Allen | Roseto Sharks | 23.2 |
| 2. | (United States) Jazzmarr Ferguson | Angelico Biella | 22.9 |
| 3. | (Italy) Marc Trasolini | Basket Agropoli | 18.8 |
| 4. | (United States) Kenny Lawson | Basket Recanati | 20.4 |
| 5. | (United States) Terrence Roderick Jr. | Basket Agropoli | 19.1 |

=== Assists ===
| Rank | Name | Team | APG |
|---|---|---|---|
| 1. | (Italy) Matteo Fantinelli | De' Longhi Treviso | 6.5 |
| 2. | (Italy) Robert Fultz | Assigeco Casalpusterlengo | 5.6 |
| 3. | (United States) Joshua Mayo | Givova Scafati | 5.2 |
| 4. | (United States) Terrence Roderick Jr. | Basket Agropoli | 5.2 |
| 5. | (United States) Michael B. Deloach | OraSì Ravenna | 4.7 |

=== Steals ===
| Rank | Name | Team | SPG |
|---|---|---|---|
| 1. | (United States) Kelvin Martin | Moncada Agrigento | 2.2 |
| 2. | (United States) Jonte Flowers | Fortitudo Bologna | 2.1 |
| 3. | (Italy) Jordan Losi | Bondi Ferrara | 1.9 |
| 4. | (Italy) Matteo Fantinelli | De' Longhi Treviso | 1.8 |
| 5. | (United States) Rayvonte Rice | Tezenis Verona | 1.7 |

=== Rebounds ===
| Rank | Name | Team | RPG |
|---|---|---|---|
| 1. | (United States) Mike Hall | Angelico Biella | 13.0 |
| 2. | (United States) Kenny Lawson | Basket Recanati | 10.6 |
| 3. | (Italy) Dane Robert DiLiegro | Mens Sana Siena | 10.3 |
| 4. | (United States) William Mosley | Benacquista Latina | 10.2 |
| 5. | (United States) Ed Daniel | Fortitudo Bologna | 9.7 |

=== Blocks ===
| Rank | Name | Team | BPG |
|---|---|---|---|
| 1. | (United States) Taylor Smith | OraSì Ravenna | 2.5 |
| 2. | (United States) William Mosley | Benacquista Latina | 2.2 |
| 3. | (United States) Scott Eatherton | Moncada Agrigento | 1.8 |
| 4. | (Italy) Andrea Crosariol | Bermé Reggio Calabria | 1.7 |
| 5. | (United States) Isaiah Armwood | Proger Chieti | 1.5 |

=== Valuation ===
| Rank | Name | Team | VPG |
|---|---|---|---|
| 1. | (Italy) Marc Trasolini | Basket Agropoli | 24.6 |
| 2. | (United States) Kenny Lawson | Basket Recanati | 23.7 |
| 3. | (United States) Mike Hall | Angelico Biella | 21.9 |
| 4. | (United States) Nikolas Thomas Raivio | Legnano Knights | 21.8 |
| 5. | (United States) Ed Daniel | Fortitudo Bologna | 20.9 |

== Sponsors ==
- Citroën (general)
- Adidas
- Molten
- Novi
- Oiko
- Dalla Riva Sportfloors
- Sportsystem
- Vivaticket
- Spalding
- Joker Floors
- Iredem
- Panorama
