= 2018–19 Serie A2 Basket =

Serie A2 Basket
- Season: 2018–19
- Duration: 5 October 2018 – 17 June 2019
- Games played: 480 (Regular season); 49 (Playoffs/Playout)
- Teams: 32
- TV partner: Sportitalia

Regular season
- Top seed: Lavoropiù Fortitudo Bologna (East); Virtus Roma (West)
- Promoted: De' Longhi Treviso; Lavoropiù Fortitudo Bologna; Virtus Roma
- Relegated: Termoforgia Jesi; Mens Sana Siena; BPC Virtus Cassino; Baltur Cento; Bakery Piacenza

Finals
- Champions: Lavoropiù Fortitudo Bologna
- Runners-up: Benfapp Capo d'Orlando
- Semi-finalists: Bergamo; Remer Blu Basket Treviglio
- Finals MVP: (United States) Henry Sims (A2 Finals) (Poland) David Logan (Playoff Finals)

Statistical leaders
| Points | (United States) Jordan Parks | 23.0 |
| Rebounds | (United States) Jeremy Simmons | 10.6 |
| Assists | (United States) Brandon Triche | 9.0 |
| Index Rating | (United States) Brandon Triche | 30.3 |

The 2018–19 Serie A2 season, known for sponsorship reasons as the Serie A2 Old Wild West, was the 45th season of the Italian basketball second league Serie A2 Basket. The season started on October 5, 2018, and ended on June 17, 2019, with the last game of the promotion playoffs finals.

Lavoropiù Fortitudo Bologna won their 1st title by beating Virtus Roma in the game 2 of the A2 Finals.

== Rules ==
The season was composed of 32 teams with a regional subdivision in two equal groups of sixteen, East and West. Each team played twice each team in its subgroup, the second ranked team of each group then plays the 9th ranked team of the other group (e.g. East No. 2 against West No. 9), then the third best against the 8th, and so on, to form a promotion playoffs (for one place) of sixteen teams. Two more teams (1st ranked of each group) were promoted directly without going through the playoffs

== Regular season ==
=== East Group league table ===
| Pos | Team | Pld | W | L | PF | PA | PD | Pts | Qualification or relegation |
|---|---|---|---|---|---|---|---|---|---|
| 1 | Lavoropiù Fortitudo Bologna (P) | 30 | 25 | 5 | 2596 | 2312 | +284 | 50 | Promotion to LBA |
| 2 | De' Longhi Treviso | 30 | 24 | 6 | 2442 | 2053 | +389 | 48 | Qualification to Playoffs |
| 3 | XL Extralight Montegranaro | 30 | 23 | 7 | 2387 | 2207 | +180 | 46 | Qualification to Playoffs |
| 4 | Tezenis Verona | 30 | 19 | 11 | 2386 | 2320 | +66 | 38 | Qualification to Playoffs |
| 5 | G.S.A. Udine | 30 | 18 | 12 | 2356 | 2231 | +125 | 36 | Qualification to Playoffs |
| 6 | Unieuro Forlì | 30 | 16 | 14 | 2427 | 2428 | −1 | 32 | Qualification to Playoffs |
| 7 | Pompea Mantova | 30 | 15 | 15 | 2291 | 2321 | −30 | 30 | Qualification to Playoffs |
| 8 | Cimorosi Roseto | 30 | 15 | 15 | 2451 | 2378 | +73 | 30 | Qualification to Playoffs |
| 9 | OraSì Ravenna | 30 | 13 | 17 | 2318 | 2437 | −119 | 26 | Qualification to Playoffs |
| 10 | Le Naturelle Imola Basket | 30 | 12 | 18 | 2512 | 2580 | −68 | 24 | |
| 11 | Bondi Ferrara | 30 | 11 | 19 | 2390 | 2487 | −97 | 22 | |
| 12 | Assigeco Piacenza | 30 | 11 | 19 | 2364 | 2360 | +4 | 22 | |
| 13 | Hertz Cagliari | 30 | 11 | 19 | 2390 | 2610 | −220 | 22 | |
| 14 | Bakery Piacenza | 30 | 9 | 21 | 2331 | 2511 | −180 | 18 | Qualification to Relegation playout |
| 15 | Baltur Cento | 30 | 9 | 21 | 2230 | 2402 | −172 | 18 | Qualification to Relegation playout |
| 16 | Termoforgia Jesi (E) | 30 | 9 | 21 | 2435 | 2671 | −236 | 18 | Relegation to Serie B |

Source: Lega Pallacanestro
(E) Eliminated; (P) Promoted

=== West Group league table ===
| Pos | Team | Pld | W | L | PF | PA | PD | Pts | Qualification or relegation |
|---|---|---|---|---|---|---|---|---|---|
| 1 | Virtus Roma (P) | 28 | 20 | 8 | 2317 | 2188 | +129 | 40 | Promotion to LBA |
| 2 | Benfapp Capo d'Orlando | 28 | 20 | 8 | 2464 | 2284 | +180 | 40 | Qualification to Playoffs |
| 3 | Remer Blu Basket Treviglio | 28 | 18 | 10 | 2314 | 2225 | +89 | 36 | Qualification to Playoffs |
| 4 | Bergamo | 28 | 17 | 11 | 2313 | 2190 | +123 | 34 | Qualification to Playoffs |
| 5 | Zeus Energy Group Rieti | 28 | 17 | 11 | 2058 | 2040 | +18 | 34 | Qualification to Playoffs |
| 6 | Edinol Pallacanestro Biella | 28 | 16 | 12 | 2161 | 2071 | +90 | 32 | Qualification to Playoffs |
| 7 | Novipiù Casale Monferrato | 28 | 16 | 12 | 2324 | 2235 | +89 | 32 | Qualification to Playoffs |
| 8 | Benacquista Assicurazioni Latina | 28 | 15 | 13 | 2496 | 2440 | +56 | 30 | Qualification to Playoffs |
| 9 | 2B Control Trapani | 28 | 14 | 14 | 2393 | 2365 | +28 | 28 | Qualification to Playoffs |
| 10 | M Rinnovabili Agrigento | 28 | 14 | 14 | 2174 | 2228 | −54 | 28 | |
| 11 | Givova Scafati | 28 | 14 | 14 | 2328 | 2375 | −47 | 28 | |
| 12 | Leonis Roma | 28 | 11 | 17 | 2206 | 2335 | −129 | 22 | |
| 13 | Bertram Tortona | 28 | 10 | 18 | 2149 | 2179 | −30 | 20 | |
| 14 | Axpo Legnano | 28 | 6 | 22 | 2168 | 2386 | −218 | 12 | Qualification to Relegation playout |
| 15 | BPC Virtus Cassino | 28 | 2 | 26 | 2100 | 2424 | −324 | 4 | Qualification to Relegation playout |
| 16 | Soundreef Siena (Note: 3 points deducted to Siena for irregularities of the surety required entry to the league. Siena was later excluded from the championship.) (E) | 0 | – | – | – | – | — | 0 | Relegation to Serie B |

Source: Lega Pallacanestro
(E) Eliminated; (P) Promoted

== Coppa Italia ==
At the half of the league, the four first teams of each group in the table played the LNP Cup.

=== Bracket ===
Quarter-finals; 1 March 2019
1E | Lavoropiù Fortitudo Bologna | 75
4W | Edinol Pallacanestro Biella | 50
2W | Virtus Roma | 77
3E | Tezenis Verona | 60
1W | Bergamo | 83
4E | XL Extralight Montegranaro | 75
2E | De' Longhi Treviso | 100
3W | Benacquista Assicurazioni Latina | 78

Semifinals; 2 March 2019
1E | Lavoropiù Fortitudo Bologna | 89
2W | Virtus Roma | 80
1W | Bergamo | 79
2E | De' Longhi Treviso | 82

Final; 3 March 2019
1E | Lavoropiù Fortitudo Bologna | 75
2E | De' Longhi Treviso | 84

Source: Serie A2

== Playout ==
The league play-out was played between the 14th and 15th placed teams of each group in two elimination rounds. The series was played in a best-of-three format: the first, the second and the eventual fifth game were played at home of the team that got the better ranking at the end of the regular season, the third and the eventual fourth were played at home the lower ranked team.

Semifinals
14E | Bakery Piacenza | 3
15W | BPC Virtus Cassino | 0
14W | Axpo Legnano | 3
15E | Baltur Cento | 2

Finals
14E | Bakery Piacenza | 2
14W | Axpo Legnano | 3

Source: Serie A2

== Playoffs ==
The league's playoffs were played between the second and the 9th of each group in four rounds: eightfinals, quarterfinals, semifinals and final. All series were played in a best-of-five format: the first, the second and the eventual fifth match were played at home of the best-placed team, the second, the third and the fourth, at the end of the regular season.

First round
2E | De' Longhi Treviso | 3
9W | 2B Control Trapani | 2
5W | Zeus Energy Group Rieti | 3
6E | Unieuro Forlì | 2
4E | Tezenis Verona | 3
7W | Novipiù Casale Monferrato | 1
3W | Remer Blu Basket Treviglio | 3
8E | Cimorosi Roseto | 2
2W | Benfapp Capo d'Orlando | 3
9E | OraSì Ravenna | 0
5E | G.S.A. Udine | 1
6W | Edinol Pallacanestro Biella | 3
4W | Bergamo | 3
7E | Pompea Mantova | 2
3E | XL Extralight Montegranaro | 3
8W | Benacquista Assicurazioni Latina | 2

Quarter-finals
2E | De' Longhi Treviso | 3
5W | Zeus Energy Group Rieti | 0
4E | Tezenis Verona | 2
3W | Remer Blu Basket Treviglio | 3
2W | Benfapp Capo d'Orlando | 3
6W | Edinol Pallacanestro Biella | 0
4W | Bergamo | 3
3E | XL Extralight Montegranaro | 1

Semi-finals
2E | De' Longhi Treviso | 3
3W | Remer Blu Basket Treviglio | 1
2W | Benfapp Capo d'Orlando | 3
4W | Bergamo | 0

Final
2E | De' Longhi Treviso | 3
2W | Benfapp Capo d'Orlando | 0

Source: Serie A2

== Serie A2 Finals ==
Since this season the Playoffs winner was the third promoted team to LBA. The two other promoted clubs, which were also the top seeded on the League Table at the end of the Regular Season, faced a final of two matches to decide the winner of the Serie A2.

=== Virtus Roma vs. Lavoropiù Fortitudo Bologna ===
| 28 April 2019 | Virtus Roma | 77–77 | Lavoropiù Fortitudo Bologna | Rome |
| 18:00 (CEST) | Scoring by quarter: 17–13, 26–25, 16–18, 18–21 |
| Sportitalia | Pts: Sims 20; Rebs: Sims 12; Asts: Sims 6 PIR: Sims 37 | Boxscore | Pts: Delfino 16; Rebs: Leunen 8 Asts: Rosselli 6 PIR: Leunen 24 | Arena: PalaLottomatica |

| 1 May 2019 | Lavoropiù Fortitudo Bologna | 103–100(OT) | Virtus Roma | Bologna |
| 18:00 (CEST) | Scoring by quarter: 27–11, 14–27, 25–21, 16–23, Overtime: 21–18 |
| Sportitalia | Pts: Hasbrouck 35; Rebs: Mancinelli 10; Asts: Rosselli 7 PIR: Hasbrouck 33 | Boxscore | Pts: Sims 31; Rebs: Sims 10; Asts: Santiangeli 6 PIR: Sims 38 | Arena: Land Rover Arena |

Source: Serie A2
