= Christian James =

American basketball player

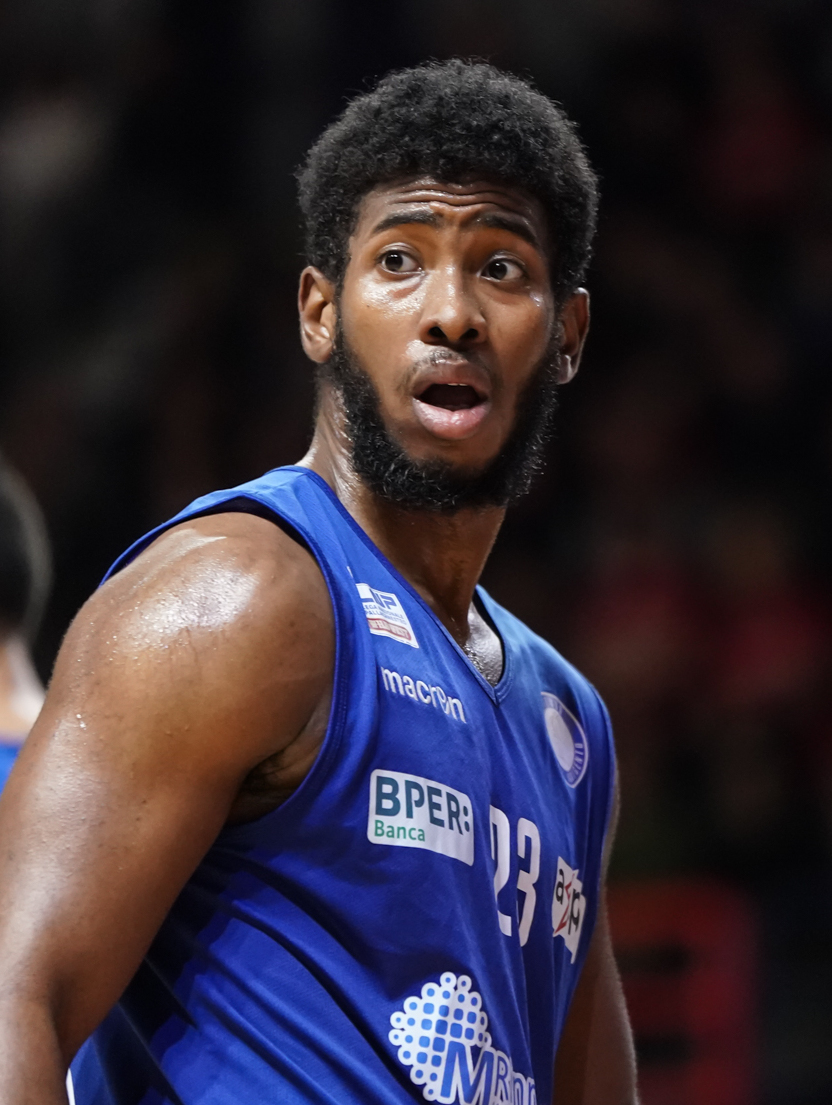
- James with Fortitudo Agrigento in 2019

Trotamundos de Carabobo
- Position: Shooting guard / small forward
- League: Venezuelan SuperLiga

Personal information
- Born: October 23, 1996 (age 30) Houston, Texas, U.S.
- Listed height: 6 ft 4 in (1.93 m)
- Listed weight: 213 lb (97 kg)

Career information
- High school: Bellaire (Bellaire, Texas)
- College: Oklahoma (2015–2019)
- NBA draft: 2019: undrafted
- Playing career: 2019–present

Career history
- 2019–2020: Fortitudo Agrigento
- 2020–2021: Mantovana
- 2021–2022: Tramec Cento
- 2022–2023: Bambitious Nara
- 2023: Prawira Bandung
- 2024: Club Atlético Goes
- 2024–present: Trotamundos

Career highlights
- Third-team All-Big 12 (2019)

Christian James (born October 23, 1996) is an American professional basketball player for Trotamundos of the Venezuelan SuperLiga. He played college basketball for the Oklahoma Sooners.

== Early life ==
James began training with former NBA player John Lucas II in eighth grade. He attended Bellaire High School in Bellaire, Texas, but graduated from Jack Yates Highschool. As a junior, he averaged 20 points and eight rebounds per game, earning District MVP honors. James suffered a broken tibia in his left leg during an Amateur Athletic Union game before his senior season. Due to the injury, he was limited to two games as a senior. James committed to play college basketball for Oklahoma over offers from Oregon, Houston, Oklahoma State, LSU and Maryland.

== College career ==
As a freshman at Oklahoma, James helped his team reach the Final Four round of the 2016 NCAA tournament. He posted 2.9 points and 1.7 rebounds per game but began to produce more later in the season. He was expected to replace Buddy Hield as a sophomore but struggled to shoot the ball, averaging 7.9 points per game and shooting 36 percent from the field. As a junior, James became a regular starter and averaged 11.9 points and 4.5 rebounds per game. He was placed in a leading role in his senior season with the departure of Trae Young. In his season opener on November 9, 2018, James scored a career-high 29 points in a 91–76 win over Texas–Rio Grande Valley. As a senior, he averaged 14.6 points and 6.2 rebounds per game, earning Third Team All-Big 12 honors.

== Professional career ==
On July 26, 2019, James signed his first professional contract with Fortitudo Agrigento of the Italian Serie A2 Basket. On March 19, 2020, he was authorized to return to his family in the United States amid the COVID-19 pandemic. In 22 games, James averaged 17.4 points, 4.8 rebounds and 2.2 assists per game. On July 11, he signed with Mantovana of the Serie A2.

On 8 December 2023, James signs with Prawira Bandung of the Indonesian Basketball League (IBL). In his debut, he recorded 23 points, 7 rebounds, and 2 assists in a loss 76–66 against Pelita Jaya on 7–17 shooting and 4–10 from 3
