= Pallacanestro =

Pallacanestro is the Italian word for basketball. It can refer to the following basketball clubs:

- A.S. Junior Pallacanestro Casale
- Associazione Pallacanestro Udinese
- Auxilium Pallacanestro Torino
- Nuova Pallacanestro Gorizia
- Nuova Pallacanestro Vigevano 1955 (it)
- Pallacanestro Bellinzona
- Pallacanestro Biella
- Pallacanestro Brescia
- Pallacanestro Cantù
- Pallacanestro Chieti (it)
- Pallacanestro Ferrara
- Pallacanestro Firenze (it)
- Pallacanestro Forlì
- Pallacanestro Fortitudo Bologna
- Pallacanestro Livorno
- Pallacanestro Mantovana
- Pallacanestro Marsala (it)
- Pallacanestro Milano 1958
- Pallacanestro Messina
- Pallacanestro Olimpia Milano
- Pallacanestro Partenope
- Pallacanestro Pavia
- Pallacanestro Petrarca Padova
- Pallacanestro Reggiana
- Pallacanestro Roseto
- Pallacanestro Sant'Antimo (it)
- Pallacanestro Trapani
- Pallacanestro Trieste
- Pallacanestro Treviso
- Pallacanestro Varese
- Pallacanestro Venezia
- Pallacanestro Virtus Bologna
- Pallacanestro Virtus Roma
