= Kyle Johnson (basketball) =

Canadian-born British basketball player

No. 5 – Caledonia Gladiators
- Position: Shooting guard
- League: BBL

Personal information
- Born: 31 December 1988 (age 37) Scarborough, Ontario, Canada
- Listed height: 1.95 m (6 ft 5 in)
- Listed weight: 88 kg (194 lb)

Career information
- High school: West Hill Collegiate Institute (Toronto, Ontario)
- College: LIU Brooklyn (2007–2011)
- NBA draft: 2011: undrafted
- Playing career: 2011–present

Career history
- 2011: Ilysiakos
- 2011–2012: APOEL
- 2012–2013: Sutor Montegranaro
- 2013: Basket Ferentino
- 2013–2014: Vanoli Cremona
- 2014–2015: Brampton A's
- 2015: Pallacanestro Biella
- 2015–2016: Pallacanestro Cantù
- 2016: Junior Casale
- 2016–2018: London Lightning
- 2018–2019: SO Maritime Boulogne
- 2019: St. John's Edge
- 2019–2020: Stjarnan
- 2020: Fraser Valley Bandits
- 2021: Njarðvík
- 2021: Ottawa Blackjacks
- 2021–2022: Hamilton Honey Badgers
- 2021: Þór Þorlákshöfn
- 2022–2023: Newcastle Eagles
- 2023: Brampton Honey Badgers
- 2023–present: Caledonia Gladiators

Career highlights
- NEC All-rookie team (2008); NEC Champion (2011); NBL Champion (2017, 2018); Icelandic Cup (2020); Icelandic Super Cup (2019)

Kyle Johnson OLY (born 31 December 1988) is a Canadian-born British basketball player for the Caledonia Gladiators of the British Basketball League (BBL). Born in Scarborough, Ontario, Johnson played for West Hill Collegiate Institute before enrolling to LIU Brooklyn to play college basketball.

== College career ==
Coming from West Hill Collegiate Institute in Toronto, Johnson's college career spanned four seasons, where he averaged 11.6 points per game whilst making a Long Island University record 124 appearances. As a freshman, he was named in the NEC all-rookie team. During his senior year Johnson helped the Blackbirds to a 27–6 record, Win the 2011 Northeast Conference men's basketball tournament and an appearance in the 2011 NCAA Men's Division I Basketball Tournament. He ranks 11th all-time at the school in scoring (1,433) and is second in both three-pointers made (240) and attempted (666).

== Professional career ==
In September 2011 he signed a contract with Ilysiakos in Greece, but in November 2011 he moved to Cypriot club APOEL. He then played one season with Sutor Montegranaro. In November 2013, he signed with Basket Ferentino. He was waived on 18 December 2013. On 23 December 2013 he signed with Vanoli Cremona. On 25 March 2015, he signed with Pallacanestro Biella of the Serie A2 Basket. In December 2015 he joined Pallacanestro Cantù of the Lega Basket, but he left the team in February 2016 to join Junior Casale.

On 29 December 2016, Johnson signed with London Lightning of the National Basketball League of Canada. On 5 February 2017, he set the points and field goals made record for the London Lightning, as he scored 51 points on 17-of-21 field goals to help his team win 146–102 against the Moncton Miracles.

In July 2019, Johnson signed with Stjarnan of the Úrvalsdeild karla. Stjarnan opened the 2019–20 season with a 89–77 win against reigning champions KR in the annual Icelandic Super Cup behind Johnson's 21 points. On 15 February 2020, Johnson scored 14 points in Stjarnan's 75–89 win against Grindavík in the Icelandic Cup.

In February 2020, Kyle Johnson signed to play for the Fraser Valley Bandits of the Canadian Elite Basketball League. For the season he averaged 5.0 points and 3.0 rebounds in 7 games.

In January 2021, Johnson returned to Iceland and signed with Úrvalsdeild club Njarðvík. For the season, he averaged 15.1 points and 7.4 rebounds per game.

On 11 May 2021, Johnson signed with the Ottawa Blackjacks of the Canadian Elite Basketball League. After appearing in 4 games for the Blackjacks, Johnson signed with the Hamilton Honey Badgers in July. He appeared in 6 games with the Honey Badgers, averaging 8.3 points and 2.7 rebounds per game.

In January 2022, Johnson signed with reigning Icelandic champions Þór Þorlákshöfn. In 8 regular season games, he averaged 12.0 points and 5.9 rebounds per game. He averaged 13.7 points in seven playoff games, scoring a season high 29 points in a victory against Grindavík in the first round. In the second round, Þór was swept by eventual champions Valur. In May, he returned to the Hamilton Honey Badgers.

== National team career ==
Johnson has been a part of the Great Britain national basketball team since 2011. He has played in many competitions for the team, most notably the London 2012 Olympics and the 2011 Eurobasket, 2013 Eurobasket, 2017 Eurobasket Championships.
