= Vincenzo Esposito =

Italian basketball player and coach

Personal information
- Born: March 1, 1969 (age 57) Caserta, Campania, Italy
- Listed height: 194 cm (6 ft 4 in)
- Listed weight: 90 kg (198 lb)

Career information
- NBA draft: 1991: undrafted
- Playing career: 1984–2014
- Position: Shooting guard
- Number: 4
- Coaching career: 2009–present

Career history

Playing
- 1984–1993: Juvecaserta Basket
- 1993–1995: Fortitudo Bologna
- 1995–1996: Toronto Raptors
- 1996–1997: Scavolini Pesaro
- 1997–1998: Mabo Pistoia
- 1998–2001: Andrea Costa Imola
- 2001–2002: Snaidero Udine
- 2002: Telecom Gran Canaria
- 2002–2003: Andrea Costa Imola
- 2003–2004: Scafati Basket
- 2004: Lottomatica Roma
- 2004–2005: Andrea Costa Imola
- 2005: Polaris World Murcia
- 2005–2006: Casale Monferrato
- 2006: Capo d'Orlando
- 2006–2007: Gragnano
- 2007–2009: Gira Ozzano
- 2013–2014: Imola

Coaching
- 2009–2010: Aquila Trento
- 2010–2011: Fortitudo Agrigento
- 2013–2014: Imola
- 2014–2015: Juvecaserta
- 2015–2018: Pistoia 2000
- 2018–2019: Dinamo Sassari
- 2019–2021: Brescia Leonessa

Career highlights
- As player: Italian League champion (1991); Italian Cup winner (1988); 2× Italian League MVP (1999, 2000); 3× Italian League Top Scorer (1999–2001); Italian All Star Game MVP (1998); Italian 2nd Division Top Scorer (2005); Italian 3rd Division Top Scorer (2009); No. 6 retired by JuveCaserta; As head coach: Italian League Coach of the Year (2017)
- Stats at NBA.com
- Stats at Basketball Reference
Medals
Men's basketball
Representing Italy
European U-18 Championship
Silver medal – second place	1988 Yugoslavia	U-18 Team
FIBA Europe U-16 Championship
Bronze medal – third place	1985 Bulgaria	U-16 Team

Vincenzo Esposito (Italian: [vinˈtʃɛntso eˈspɔːzito]; born March 1, 1969) is an Italian former professional basketball player and coach, he lastly worked for Germani Basket Brescia of the Lega Basket Serie A (LBA), in Italy. During his playing career, he played at the shooting guard position.

Esposito was the first player signed by the Toronto Raptors of the NBA, also making him the first Italian signed by an NBA team. The majority of his playing career took place in Italy, where he was named the league's most valuable player in 1999 and 2000. He also won the Italian Cup in 1988, and the Italian league championship with Juvecaserta, in 1991.

== Professional playing career ==
=== Early career ===
The Caserta native started his career with hometown club Juvecaserta Basket during the 1984–85 Serie A season, at age 15.

With the Campanian club he won the 1988 Italian Basketball Cup and the 1990–91 Serie A championship, the club's first (and as of 2021 only) national championship, during that time the team also played in the 1991–92 FIBA European League and the 1992–93 FIBA Korać Cup.

Esposito moved to Fortitudo Bologna in 1993, playing there for two years.

=== Toronto Raptors ===
Esposito had been noticed by NBA teams: the Cleveland Cavaliers through scout Rudy D'Amico and the Toronto Raptors through Bob Zuffelato. Though he had agreed terms with the Cavaliers, complications related to the NBA lockout meant he could only sign with the Raptors.

When he signed a multi-year deal on 25 May 1995, he was the first player ever signed by the Canadian expansion team (predating the expansion draft and 1995 NBA draft by a month).

Though Esposito wasn't the first Italian to play in an NBA game – preceded by Stefano Rusconi by three days – he was the first to score, on a free throw in a 15 November game against the Houston Rockets.

With the Raptors' 21–61 season, he played 30 games, averaging 3.9 points and 0.8 assists, in 9.4 minutes. His best performance was 18 points, 2 assists, 2 offensive rebounds, and 2 turnovers, in 30 minutes, during a 6 April 1996 loss to the New York Knicks in Madison Square Garden.

=== Return to Europe ===
Despite having two years left on his contract, and having a chance of a trade to the Philadelphia 76ers, Esposito returned to Italy to sign with Scavolini Pesaro in summer 1996. Penning a contract reportedly worth at least 1 billion lire net annually (more than 500,000 in euros today), Esposito was acclaimed as a star on his return. However, Pesaro struggled in the league and the club and the player agreed to a buyout in November 1997, with the player moving to Mabo Pistoia.

He joined Andrea Costa Imola after the 1997–98 season, and there he regained his top form, by top-scoring the league for three consecutive years, and being twice designated as league MVP, in 1999 and 2000, and also All Star Game MVP in 1998.

He moved to Snaidero Udine in 2001, but he only stayed until January 2002, before having another experience abroad, in the Spanish Liga ACB with Telecom Gran Canaria, where he finished the season. He impressed in Spain averaging more than 20 points per game, including 45 in an April game against Valladolid.

=== Later years ===
He returned to Imola, then in the second division Legadue, in 2002, staying there one year, and in 2003 to another Legadue team Scafati Basket . Esposito stayed there until February 2004, when the nearly 35-year-old returned to the Serie A with Lottomatica Roma, to provide more depth to an injury-struck squad. He played less than usual, and finished averaging 3.5 points in the league, also scoring 14 in his first (and last) career Euroleague game, against Pau-Orthez.

He returned to Imola, Legadue, for the 2004–05 season, with then a brief stay at the end of the Regular Season to play in the LEB playoffs with Polaris World Murcia.

Another return to Legadue followed in 2005, with Casale Monferrato, where he stayed until February 2006, as he signed with Capo d'Orlando for his last Serie A season. In November 2006, he joined the third division Serie B1 club Gragnano. He signed in 2007 with another Serie B1 team, Gira Ozzano, staying there for two years, before ending his playing career in 2009, at 40 years old.

Esposito finished his 25-year playing career with 762 games played, across all teams and divisions, with 13,286 points scored, for an average of 17.43 points per game.

== National team playing career ==
Esposito played several years for the youth national teams of Italy, playing in the 1985 FIBA Europe Under-16 Championship, where he won a bronze medal, and the 1988 FIBA Europe Under-18 Championship, where he was the Team Best Scorer, as they lost in the final.

He later joined the senior men's Italian national basketball team for EuroBasket 1995, where Italy made it to the quarterfinals and he was the Team Best Scorer. Later on he played in the qualifiers for EuroBasket 1997, but he did not participate to the tournament. Following the year 2002 Esposito never played again for the Italian national basketball team.

== Coaching career ==
After his retirement from playing professional basketball, Esposito started a basketball coaching career with Aquila Basket Trento of the Serie A Dilettanti (the renamed third division) for the 2009–10 season, with the team finishing ninth. The next year, he coached Fortitudo Agrigento in the same division, leaving after one year.

In July 2013, he returned to Imola, to coach the team that was still in the second division (now DNA Gold), after his team only won 1 game in 13, he decided - at 44 - to return to the team as player, leaving coaching duties to his assistant.

He rejoined another former club, Juvecaserta, in 2014, to serve as assistant coach to Emanuele Molin first and then Zare Markovski in the Serie A. When Markovski was dismissed in December, with Caserta at zero games won in 11 games, Esposito took over as head coach. He helped them to 8 wins in the next 19 games, which gave them hope of escaping relegation, however the team lost their final game and were unable to achieve safety.

Esposito would stay in the Serie A, signing a two-year deal with Giorgio Tesi Group Pistoia in June 2015. In two years as the head coach of the Giorgio Tesi Group Pistoia he took twice the team to the playoffs, one time to the Italian Basketball Cup, and at the end of the season 2017 he was named Italian League Coach of the Year (Lega Basket Serie A awards)

On May 22, 2018, Esposito signed a deal with Banco di Sardegna Sassari in LBA.

On May 26, 2019, Esposito signed a deal with Germani Basket Brescia.

== NBA statistics ==
Source.

Year	Team	GP	GS	MPG	FG%	3P%	FT%	RPG	APG	SPG	BPG	PPG
1995–96	Toronto	30	0	9.4	.360	.232	.795	.5	.8	.2	.0	3.9
Career		30	0	9.4	.360	.232	.795	.5	.8	.2	.0	3.9
