= Marco Ceron =

Italian basketball player (born 1992)

No. 11 – Longobardi Scafati Basket
- Position: Shooting guard
- League: LBA

Personal information
- Born: 16 June 1992 (age 34) Mirano, Venice, Italy
- Listed height: 1.95 m (6 ft 5 in)
- Listed weight: 100 kg (220 lb)

Career information
- Playing career: 2009–present

Career history
- 2009–2013: Reyer Venezia
- 2011–2012: → Basket Recanati
- 2012: → Basket Napoli
- 2012–2013: → Lago Maggiore
- 2013–2014: Azzurro Basket Napoli
- 2014–2015: Reyer Venezia
- 2015–2018: VL Pesaro
- 2018–2020: Brescia Leonessa
- 2020: Scaligera Verona
- 2021: Pallacanestro Mantovana
- 2021–2022: Virtus Bologna
- 2022–2025: Pallacanestro Nardò
- 2025: Pistoia Basket 2000
- 2025–2026: Dinamo Sassari
- 2026–present: Scafati Basket

Career highlights
- EuroCup champion (2022); Italian Supercup winner (2021)

Marco Ceron (born 16 June 1992) is an Italian professional basketball player for Scafati Basket of the Lega Basket Serie A (LBA). He is a 6 ft 5 in (1.96 m) shooting guard.

== Professional career ==
=== Clubs ===
Since 2009 Marco Ceron was owned by Reyer Venezia, where he played in the first two seasons. In 2011 he was sent on loan to Basket Recanati in Serie A2 Basket, and later to Basket Napoli. Due to the exclusion from the 2012-13 A2 season of Napoli, the basketball club and Ceron officially parted ways. So in 2012, he went to Pallacanestro Lago Maggiore, where he won the 2013 Italian LNP Cup and named MVP of the competition.

On 25 June 2013 he went back to Naples in the Azzurro Napoli Basket club, again in Serie A2.

In 2014 Marco Ceron came back to his original club (Reyer Venezia) where he played in the 2014–15 LBA season, the highest professional basketball league in Italy.

Since 2015 he is a player for VL Pesaro, and in 2016 he signed a two-year contract extension with the club. For the 2017–18 LBA season he became team captain. In July 2018, Ceron left Pesaro after 3 years. However, despite having ended the regular season at the first place and having ousted 3–0 both Pesaro and Tortona in the first two rounds of playoffs, Virtus was defeated 4–2 in the national finals by Olimpia Milano.

On 11 July 2018 Ceron signed a two-year deal with Basket Brescia Leonessa. He played one game due to a skull injury in November 2018. On 4 August 2020 Ceron parted ways with the team.

On 4 October 2020, after a long period of inactivity, Ceron returned to play and joined Scaligera Verona with a short contract just for the Supercoppa LNP, summer trophy of Serie A2, the second tier Italian national league. He ended the 2021-21 season at Stings Mantova in the Serie A2.

On 13 August 2021 Ceron returned to the highest level of the Italian basketball, signing with Virtus Bologna in the Serie A and EuroCup Basketball. On 21 September the team won its second Supercup, defeating Olimpia Milano 90–84. Moreover, after having ousted Lietkabelis, Ulm and Valencia in the first three rounds of the playoffs, on 11 May 2022, Virtus defeated Frutti Extra Bursaspor by 80–67 at the Segafredo Arena, winning its first EuroCup and qualifying for the EuroLeague after 14 years.

On 6 August 2022, Ceron signed a deal with Pallacanestro Nardò, in the Italia Serie A2.

On February 28, 2025, he signed with Pistoia Basket 2000 of the Lega Basket Serie A (LBA).

On July 10, 2025, Buie signed with Dinamo Sassari of the Lega Basket Serie A (LBA).

On June 15, 2026, he signed with Scafati Basket of the Lega Basket Serie A (LBA).

=== Italy national basketball team ===
Marco Ceron played many years with the U-20 Italy national basketball team winning silver at the 2011 FIBA Europe Under-20 Championship.
