= Luca Garri =

Italian basketball player (born 1982)

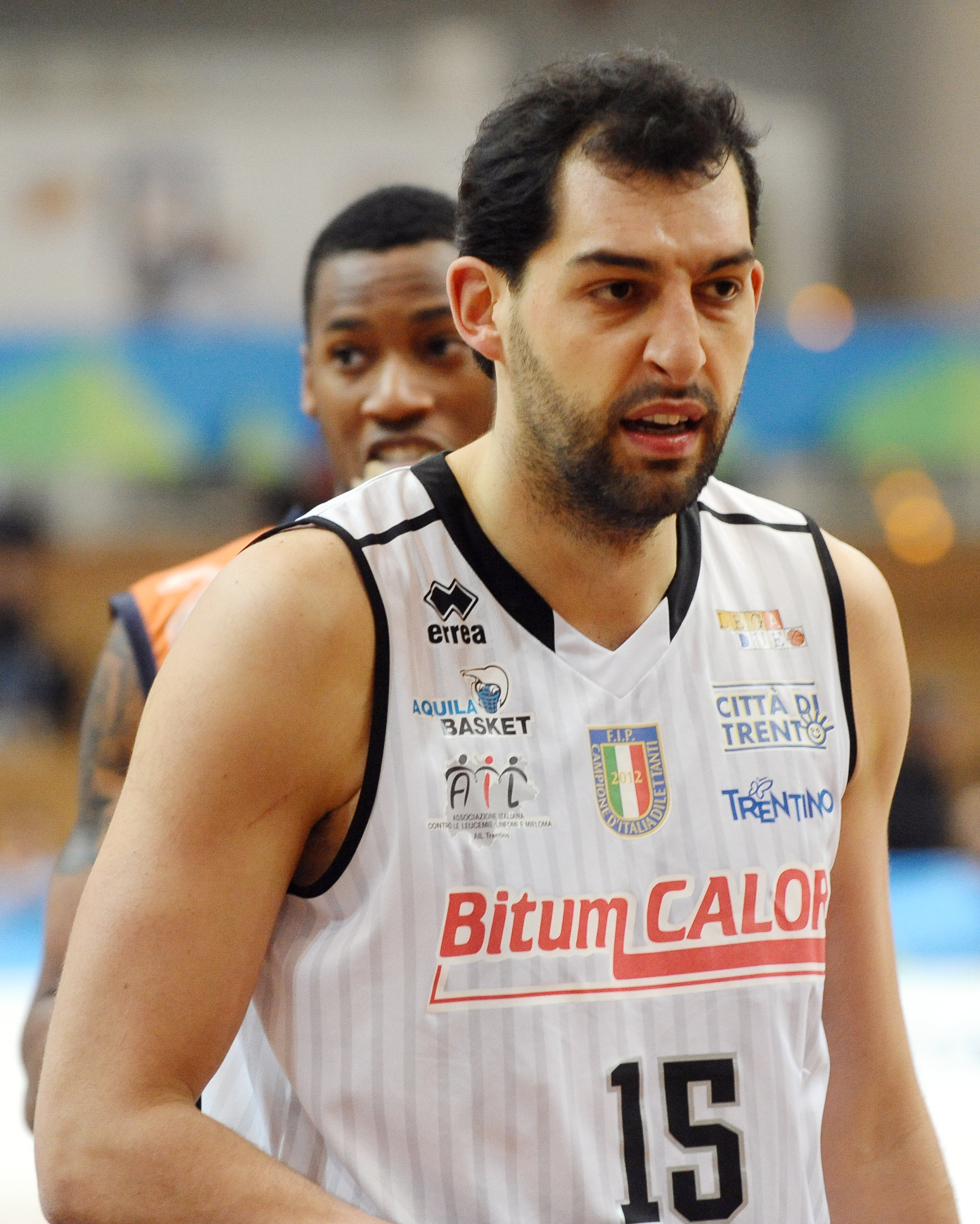
- Garri with Bitumcalor Trento in 2012

Personal information
- Born: 3 January 1982 (age 44) Asti, Italy
- Listed height: 208 cm (6 ft 10 in)
- Listed weight: 110 kg (243 lb)

Career information
- NBA draft: 2004: undrafted
- Playing career: 2000–2021
- Position: Center / power forward

Career history
- 2000–2004: Mabo Livorno
- 2004–2007: Lottomatica Roma
- 2005–2006: →Angelico Biella
- 2007–2008: Virtus Bologna
- 2008–2010: Angelico Biella
- 2010–2011: Pepsi Caserta
- 2011–2012: Cimberio Varese
- 2012–2013: Bitumcalor Trento
- 2013–2014: FMC Ferentino
- 2014–2015: Sigma Basket Barcellona
- 2015–2019: Derthona Basket
- 2019–2021: Fabriano Basket

Career highlights
- Serie A All-Star (2004)

Luca Garri (born 3 January 1982) is an Italian former professional basketball player.

== Professional career ==
Garri moved to Don Bosco Livorno aged 15, loaned to Zucchetti Montecatini in 1999-00, he played for their youth team before returning to Livorno. He made his professional debut with Mabo Livorno (Don Dosco's parent club) during the 2000-01 season, in the second division Serie A2, helping the side earn a promotion. He then spent the next three seasons in the Serie A with the side.

After that successful spell, he signed a three-year deal with fellow Serie A side Lottomatica Roma, however he didn't manage to crack the first team and a mid-season transfer to Spanish side Etosa Alicante was nearly completed before it was scrapped following an injury to his substitute Vassil Evtimov. He was loaned to Angelico Biella for 2005-06, refinding his form to average more than 11 points per game in leading Biella to the title playoffs. He returned to Roma afterwards but his 2006-07 season with the side was no more successful than his first.

Garri then signed a three-year contract with Virtus Bologna in August 2007. After one season in Bologna, he returned to Biella in 2008 on another three-year deal, playing two more seasons with the club.

In July 2010, he moved to Pepsi Caserta on a two-year deal. After spending the 2011-12 season with Cimberio Varese, Garri returned to the second division (now LegaDue), spending three seasons with respectively Bitumcalor Trento, FMC and Sigma Basket Barcellona.

In June 2015, Garri joined Derthona Basket of the Serie A2 (second division).

== International career ==
Garri played for the Italian under-age teams at the 2000 FIBA Europe Under-18 Championship (averaging 8.5 points and 3.8 rebounds in around 18 minutes per game) and at the 2002 FIBA Europe Under-20 Championship (15 points and 7.6 rebounds in more than 28 minutes per game).

He made his debut for the senior Italian national team on 1 June 2002, scoring five points against Latvia, gradually working his way into the Italy fold over the next two seasons.

Garri was the youngest member - at 22 - of the Italian squad that won a silver medal at the 2004 Summer Olympics, contributing 4.5 points and 2.4 rebounds in more than 12 minutes per game, including 2 points (on 1-for-5 shooting), 6 rebounds and 2 blocks over 17 minutes during the final against Argentina.

The following year, he was in the Italy experimental squad that won the 2005 Mediterranean Games in Almeria, but was not included in the Italy squad for EuroBasket 2005. Garri was recalled for the 2006 FIBA World Championship, averaging 4.3 points and 2.3 rebounds in around 12 minutes per game over the tournament.

He was the last player dropped from Carlo Recalcati's squad for EuroBasket 2007, he stayed in contention for Italy subsequently, but did not take part in the EuroBasket 2009 additional qualifying round, playing his last international game on 26 July 2009 against New Zealand.
