= Alessandro Ramagli =

Italian basketball coach

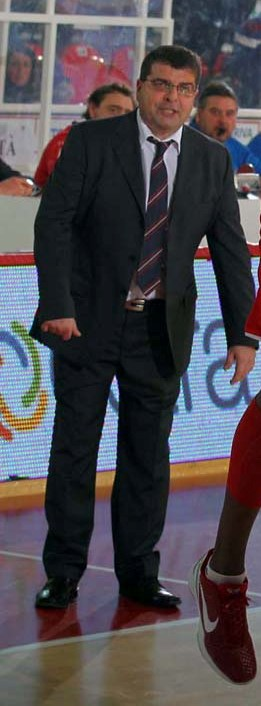

Tezenis Verona
- Position: Head coach
- League: Lega Basket Serie A

Personal information
- Born: 1 April 1964 (age 62) Livorno, Italy
- Coaching career: 1996–present

Career history
- 1996–1997: Libertas Livorno (assistant)
- 1999–2000: Libertas Livorno
- 2000–2001: Pallacanestro Biella (assistant)
- 2001–2006: Pallacanestro Biella
- 2007: Victoria Libertas Pesaro
- 2007: Benetton Treviso
- 2008–present: Italy U-18 team
- 2009–2010: Pallacanestro Reggiana
- 2010–2012: Teramo Basket
- 2012–2015: Scaligera Verona
- 2015–2016: Mens Sana Siena
- 2016–2018: Virtus Bologna
- 2018–2019: The Flexx Pistoia
- 2019–2020: APU Udine
- 2021–present: Scaligera Verona

Career highlights
- As head coach: 4x Serie A2 champion (2001, 2007, 2017, 2022); Italian LNP Cup winner (2017)

Alessandro Ramagli (born 1 April 1964) is an Italian professional basketball coach. He is currently the head coach for Scaligera Verona of the Lega Basket Serie A (LBA). Ramagli has coached multiple teams in Italy since 1996.

== Coaching career ==
Alessandro Ramagli began to work during the 80s as assistant coach of Claudio Bianchi in Libertas Livorno club. During those years he coached basketball in the elementary schools of Livorno. He later became assistant coach of Don Bosco Livorno, another club of Livorno. He replaced Stefano Michelini as head-coach of Basket Livorno in December 1999, where he went really close to the promotion to Serie A. Due to the instability of the club he went to Pallacanestro Biella in 2000, the assistant-coach of Marco Crespi and reached the promotion to the Italian top-tier level. Next year he became head-coach of Biella, where he coached until 2006. With Biella he reached the Italian League's play-offs in two seasons.

Since January 2007 he was the head-coach of Scavolini Pesaro, where he achieved promotion to Serie A.

In June 2007 Ramagli went to Benetton Treviso, but after a record of eight defeats in 10 games he left Treviso's bench. Since January 2009 he replaced Franco Marcelletti on the Trenkwalder Reggio Emilia bench in Serie A2. By the end of November 2010, he also replaced Andrea Capobianco with Teramo Basket in Serie A, where he remains until the company's disappearance in summer 2012.

From 2012 to 2015 Ramagli was head coach of Scaligera Verona in Serie A2 Basket.

In July 2015 he signed a three-year contract with Mens Sana Siena.

In June 2016, Ramagli signed a contract as head coach of Segafredo Virtus Bologna in the Italian second-tier level Serie A2 Basket. At the end of the 2015-16 Serie A2 season he achieved promotion to the top-tier level LBA.

On 25 May 2018 Ramagli left Bologna after two years as head coach.

On 12 June 2018 Ramagli went to The Flexx Pistoia and became head coach of the Italian club.

== Honours and titles ==
Head coach

- Italian LNP Cup: 2

Virtus Bologna (2017)
Scaligera Verona (2015)

- Serie A2 Basket: 3

Virtus Bologna (2016-17)
Scavolini Pesaro (2007-08)
Angelico Biella (2001-02)
