= William Mosley =

American basketball center (born 1989)

Personal information
- Born: June 22, 1989 (age 37) Shreveport, Louisiana
- Listed height: 6 ft 8 in (2.03 m)
- Listed weight: 225 lb (102 kg)

Career information
- High school: Huntington (Shreveport, Louisiana)
- College: Northwestern State (2008–2012)
- NBA draft: 2012: undrafted
- Playing career: 2012–2024
- Position: Center

Career history
- 2012–2013: Fortitudo Bologna
- 2013–2014: Ferentino
- 2014–2015: Recanati
- 2015–2016: Latina
- 2016–2018: Legnano Knights
- 2018–2019: Trieste
- 2019–2021: Partizan
- 2021–2022: Mornar
- 2022: UNICS
- 2022–2023: Shinshu Brave Warriors
- 2024: Spartak Subotica

Career highlights
- Serbian Cup winner (2020); ABA League Supercup winner (2019); ABA League Second Division champion (2024); Serie A2 rebounds leader (2015); Serie A2 blocks leader (2015); NCAA blocks leader (2011); First-team All-Southland (2012); Second-team All-Southland (2011)

William Ralph Mosley, Jr. (born June 22, 1989) is an American former basketball center who last played for Spartak Subotica of the Basketball League of Serbia. He played for Northwestern State from 2008–09 through 2011–12. He is best known for leading NCAA Division I in blocks as a junior in 2010–11. Mosley recorded a school single season record 156 blocks in 32 games player for an average of 4.9 per game. He graduated after 2011–12 as the fifth most prolific shot blocker in NCAA history after having accumulated 456 career blocks.

== Early life ==
Mosley was born in Shreveport, Louisiana. He attended Huntington High School from 2003–04 to 2006–07, and as a senior he was named Second-team All-District 1-5A on a team that finished with a 34–6 overall record. The Raiders, as the team was known, was the second-ranked team in Louisiana's Class 5A. During his final high school season, Mosley averaged 9.2 points, 11.3 rebounds 5.2 blocks per game.

== College ==
Mosley stayed in his home state to play college basketball, although his collegiate career did not begin until 2008–09. That season, he ranked fourth nationally in rebounds per game (8.5) among freshmen and second in blocks per game (2.5). His 76 blocked shots placed him 10th all-time in Northwestern State University history while also ranking him second in single season totals.

The following year, his sophomore campaign, Mosley led the Southland Conference with 3.4 blocks per game. He recorded career highs of eight blocks and 21 rebounds en route to being named an Honorable Mention All-Conference selection.

In 2010–11, Mosley increased his statistical averages in most categories, most noticeably in blocks per game. He played in three more games than the year before but also increased his average by 1.5 blocks per game, and Mosley's 4.9 topped NCAA Division I. He had entered his junior year having already amassed 174 career blocks and needing 29 to become the school's all-time leader. After recording 156 during his junior year, and still having one full season left to play, Mosley has entered his senior season in 2011–12 as the school record holder by 127 blocks. When his college career ended following the 2011–12 season he had recorded 456 blocks. This total placed him fifth all-time on the NCAA Division I men's basketball career blocks leaderboard.

== Professional career ==
On July 16, 2016, Mosley signed with Italian club Legnano Knights.

On August 2, 2018, Mosley signed a deal with the Italian club Pallacanestro Trieste for the LBA.

On July 23, 2019, Mosley signed a one-year deal for Serbian team Partizan. On February 21, 2020, he signed a new three-year deal with Partizan. He parted ways with the team on October 12, 2021.

On October 15, 2021, Mosely signed with Mornar of the Adriatic League.

On April 16, 2022, he has signed with UNICS of the VTB United League.

On November 25, 2022, Mosley signed with Shinshu Brave Warriors of the Japanese B.League.

== Personal life ==
=== Infant twin sons' deaths ===
On March 3, 2012, Mosley's two infant twin sons, Jayden and Kayden Mosley, died after spending their entire lives in a hospital due to respiratory issues. The twins were born on March 20, 2011, and there was no apparent threat prior to their deaths.

== See also ==
- List of NCAA Division I men's basketball season blocks leaders
- List of NCAA Division I men's basketball career blocks leaders
