= Dimitri Lauwers =

Belgian basketball player

Free agent
- Position: Shooting guard

Personal information
- Born: 30 April 1979 (age 47) Liegi, Belgium
- Listed height: 187 cm (6 ft 2 in)
- Listed weight: 82 kg (181 lb)

Career information
- Playing career: 1997–present

Career history
- 1997–2000: BC Oostende
- 2000–2001: Le Mans Basket
- 2001–2002: Cholet Basket
- 2002–2004: Dijon Basket
- 2004–2005: Teramo Basket
- 2005–2008: Scafati Basket
- 2008–2009: Virtus Bologna
- 2009: →Pallacanestro Varese
- 2009–2012: Air Avellino
- 2012: BC Oostende
- 2013: Scaligera Verona
- 2013–2014: Sutor Montegranaro
- 2014–2016: Basket Recanati

Career highlights
- Belgian Cup winner (1998); French Leaders Cup winner (2004); 2× LegaDue champion (2006, 2009); LegaDue Cup winner (2006); Belgian League champion (2012)

Dimitri Lauwers (born 30 April 1979) is a Belgian professional basketball player. He also played for the Belgian national basketball team at EuroBasket 2011.

== Professional career ==
In the 1997 he made his debut with the BC Oostende and in 1998 he won the Belgian Cup. After three seasons he left the team and went to play in France, where he played with three teams (Le Mans, Cholet and Dijon) and won the French Leaders Cup in 2004. He then moved to Italy to play with Teramo, Scafati, Virtus Bologna, Varese and Avellino and won the LegaDue championship twice (in 2006 and 2009) and the LegaDue Cup (in 2006). In 2012 he came back to the BC Oostende and won the Belgian League. In 2013, he returned to play in Italy for Scaligera Verona and Sutor Montegranaro. He currently plays for Recanati.
