= Marcelo Nicola =

Argentine-Italian basketball player and coach

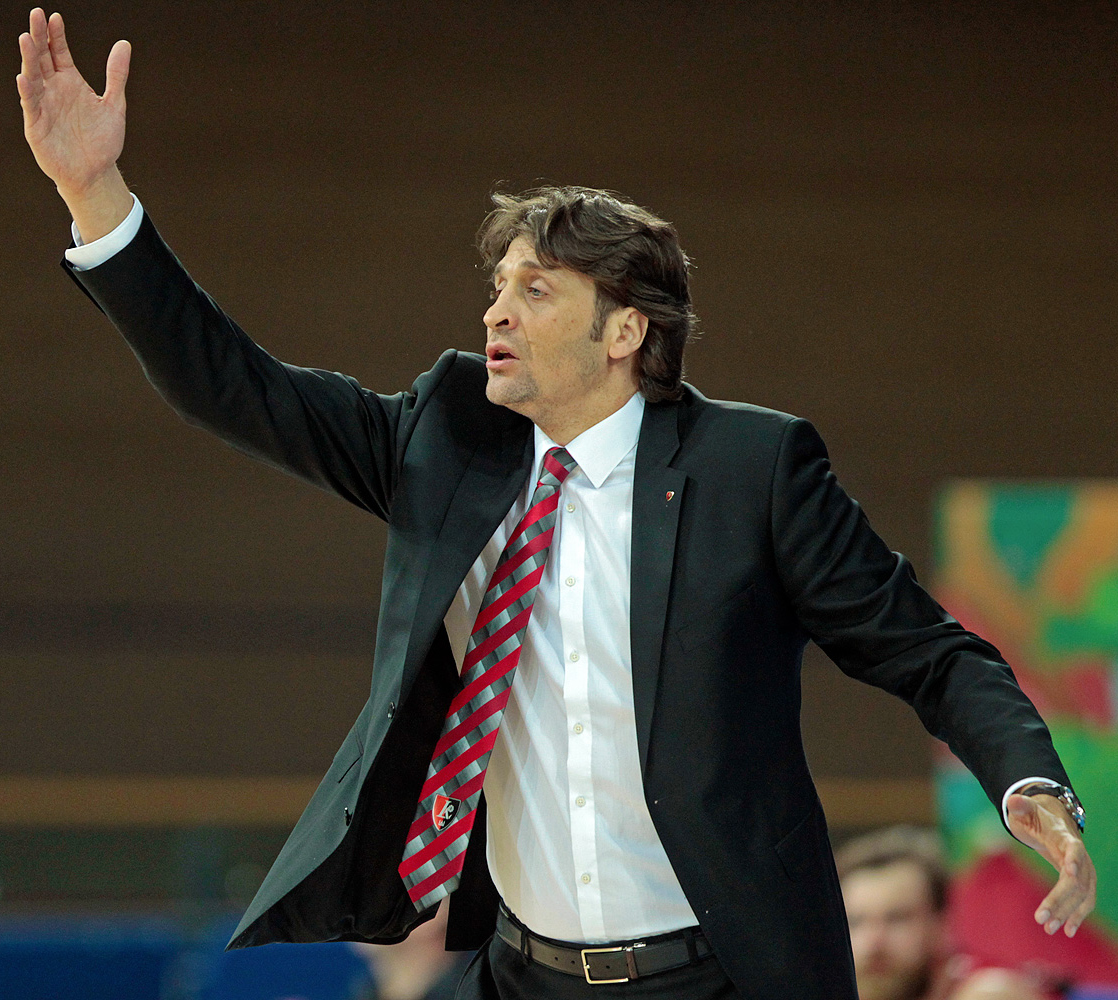
- Nicola with Lietuvos rytas Vilnius

Universo Treviso Basket
- Title: Head coach
- League: LBA

Personal information
- Born: 12 May 1971 (age 55) Rafaela, Santa Fe, Argentina
- Listed height: 6 ft 9 in (2.06 m)
- Listed weight: 225 lb (102 kg)

Career information
- NBA draft: 1993: 2nd round, 50th overall pick
- Drafted by: Houston Rockets
- Playing career: 1988–2007
- Position: Power forward
- Number: 4, 11, 13
- Coaching career: 2014–present

Career history

Playing
- 1988–1989: Cañadense
- 1989–1991: Baskonia
- 1991: Long Island Surf
- 1991–1996: Baskonia
- 1996–1997: Panathinaikos
- 1997–1998: FC Barcelona
- 1998–2004: Benetton Treviso
- 2004–2005: BC Kyiv
- 2005–2006: Mens Sana Siena
- 2006: Reggiana
- 2006–2007: Baskonia

Coaching
- 2007–2010: Benetton Treviso (assistant)
- 2011–2012: Istrana
- 2012–2014: UCAM Murcia (assistant)
- 2014: UCAM Murcia
- 2015: Lietuvos rytas Vilnius
- 2016–2017: Hapoel Jerusalem (assistant)
- 2018–2019: Bamberg (assistant)
- 2018–2019: Forlì
- 2019–2021: Gipuzkoa
- 2022–2023: Treviso
- 2024: Scafati Basket
- 2025–present: Treviso

Career highlights
- As player: FIBA Intercontinental Cup champion (1996); 2x FIBA Saporta Cup (1996, 1999); All-EuroLeague Second Team (2002); 2x Italian League champion (2002, 2003); 3x Italian Cup winner (2000, 2003, 2004); 2x Italian Supercup winner (2001, 2002); Spanish Cup winner (1995); As head coach: Copa Princesa de Asturias (2020)
- Stats at Basketball Reference
Medals
Men's basketball
Representing Argentina
FIBA AmeriCup
Silver medal – second place	1995 Argentina

Marcelo Patricio Nicola Virginio (born 12 May 1971) is an Argentine-Italian former professional basketball player and current coach. He currently serves as the head coach for Universo Treviso Basket of the Lega Basket Serie A (LBA). A very versatile power forward, Nicola was a regular member of the Argentine national basketball team, and competed for many years in the EuroLeague.

== Professional career ==
Nicola was selected 50th overall in the 1993 NBA draft, but remained in Europe and won the Saporta Cup in 1996 with Taugrés, the team in which he made his debut in the Spanish ACB League. In 1997 he was signed by Barcelona who paid Taugres 120 million pesetas (720,000 euros) for the transfer and the Argentine signed a contract for four years.

In 1997, he played his best basketball for Benetton Treviso, with which he lifted another Saporta Cup trophy in 1999, and he was selected to the All-EuroLeague Second Team for the Euroleague 2001–02 season. He also made it to the Euroleague 2002–03 final game.

== National team career ==
Nicola was a member of the Argentine national basketball team. With the junior national team of Argentina, he played at the 1993 FIBA Under-21 World Cup. With Argentina's senior men's national team, he played at the 1994 FIBA World Championship, the 1996 Olympics, and the 1998 FIBA World Championship.

== Coaching career ==
In 2012, Nicola started his coach career as assistant coach in Liga ACB team UCAM Murcia. In 2014, after the sacking of Óscar Quintana, he was named the head coach of the team.

In February 2015, he became the head coach of Lietuvos rytas Vilnius team (Lithuania) after Virginijus Šeškus release. On 16 November 2015 it was announced that Nicola was fired from Lietuvos rytas Vilnius due to poor results.

In the beginning of 2016–17 season he joined his former coach Simone Pianigiani at the Israeli club Hapoel Jerusalem.

On 8 September 2017 Nicola came back to Baskonia, where he played six years, for being the coordinator of the youth teams of the club.

On 2 June 2024 he signed with Scafati Basket of the Lega Basket Serie A (LBA).
