= Mike Hall (basketball) =

American-Irish basketball player (born 1984)

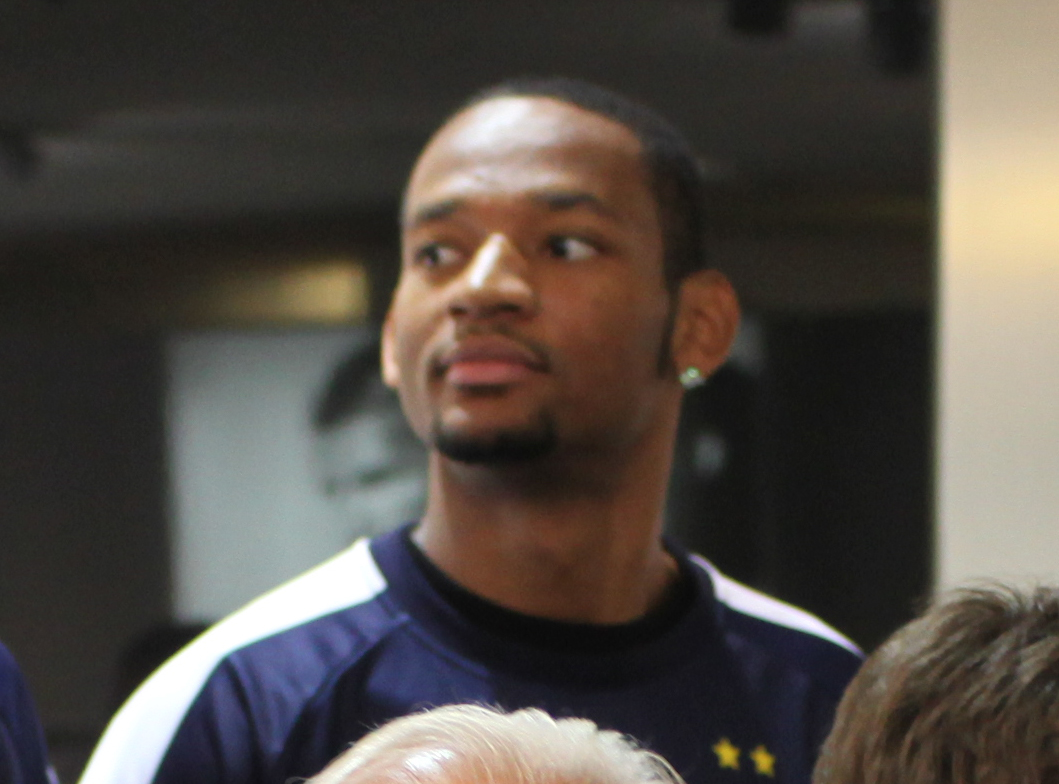
- Hall in 2009

Personal information
- Born: June 5, 1984 (age 42) Chicago, Illinois, U.S.
- Listed height: 6 ft 8 in (2.03 m)
- Listed weight: 225 lb (102 kg)

Career information
- High school: Alan B. Shepard (Palos Heights, Illinois)
- College: George Washington (2002–2006)
- NBA draft: 2006: undrafted
- Playing career: 2006–2021
- Position: Forward

Career history
- 2006–2008: Tulsa 66ers
- 2007: Washington Wizards
- 2008–2010: Olimpia Milano
- 2010: Teramo
- 2010–2011: Dakota Wizards
- 2011: Erdemir
- 2012: Fuenlabrada
- 2012: Maccabi Ashdod
- 2014: Toros de Aragua
- 2014: Manresa
- 2014: Juventud Sionista
- 2015: Aries Trikala
- 2015: Scaligera Verona
- 2015–2017: Biella
- 2017–2019: Kleb Basket Ferrara
- 2019: Virtus Cassino
- 2019–2020: Unione Cestistica Casalpusterlengo
- 2020–2021: CB Tizona

Career highlights
- 2× Second-team All-Atlantic 10 (2005, 2006)
- Stats at NBA.com
- Stats at Basketball Reference

Michael Horus Hall (born June 5, 1984) is an American-Irish former professional basketball player and current coach.

== College career ==
He attended Alan B. Shepard High School in Palos Heights, Illinois. Hall, a four-year starter at George Washington University from 2002 through 2006 was a tri-captain his senior season on a team that went 27–3. Those Colonial teams won the Atlantic 10 Conference in 2005 and made the NCAA tournament in 2005 and 2006. Hall was inducted into George Washington's Athletics Hall of Fame in 2019.

== Professional career ==
Undrafted after his senior season, Hall joined the Tulsa 66ers of the NBA Development League. On February 28, 2007, the Washington Wizards signed him to a ten-day contract due to injuries of forwards Antawn Jamison and Caron Butler. He was signed to a second ten-day contract shortly afterwards, and on March 21, the team signed him for the rest of the season. He appeared in two games for the Wizards and was released in late October, 2007 due to salary cap reasons.

On August 11, 2008, Hall signed with Armani Jeans Milano of the Lega Basket Serie A, the top level of Italian basketball. In the 2008–09 season, Hall was one of the top rebounders of Serie A. Thanks also to his good performances, Armani Jeans reached Euroleague 2008-09 Top 16 and Serie A finals, which they eventually lost to Montepaschi Siena. In the 2008–09. he scored career highs 27 points and 9 rebounds in Euroleague, and 23 points and 15 rebounds in Serie A.

In August 2010, Hall signed a contract with Bancatercas Teramo, but was released in December 2010 after the team's 0–5 start. On December 16, 2010, he was acquired by the Dakota Wizards of the NBA Development League. In January 2011, he moved to Turkey and signed with Erdemir SK. At the end of the season, he left Erdemir.

In January 2012, he signed with Fuenlabrada of Spain for the rest of the season. On November 29, 2012, he signed with Maccabi Ashdod of Israel. In his second game with Maccabi, he got injured and missed the rest of the season.

On March 26, 2014, he signed with Toros de Aragua of the Venezuelan Liga Profesional de Baloncesto.

In September 2014, Hall signed with La Bruixa d'Or Manresa of Spain. In October 2014, he parted ways with Manresa, after playing only two games. On November 26, 2014, he signed with Juventud Sionista of Argentina. He left Sionista after only three games. On February 24, 2015, he signed with Aries Trikala of the Greek Basket League. On April 17, 2015, he left Trikala and signed with Scaligera Verona of the Italian Serie A2 Basket for the rest of the season.

On October 28, 2015, Hall signed with Pallacanestro Biella of the Italian Serie A2 Basket. He later played for Pallacanestro Piacenza, Kleb Basket Ferrara and again Pallacanestro Biella.

On October 20, 2021, Hall announced his retirement from professional basketball.

== Coaching ==
In 2021, Hall joined the New York Knicks organization as a coach, coaching with the Westchester Knicks as the Player Development Manager.

== Career statistics ==
Legend
GP	Games played	GS	Games started	MPG	Minutes per game
FG%	Field-goal percentage	3P%	3-point field-goal percentage	FT%	Free-throw percentage
RPG	Rebounds per game	APG	Assists per game	SPG	Steals per game
BPG	Blocks per game	PPG	Points per game	PIR	Performance index rating
**Bold**	Career high

=== EuroLeague ===
Year	Team	GP	GS	MPG	FG%	3P%	FT%	RPG	APG	SPG	BPG	PPG	PIR
2008–09	Milano	**16**	**16**	**29.6**	**.403**	**.356**	**1.000***	4.1	.9	**1.1**	—	**8.4**	**7.2**
2009–10	Milano	10	1	25.6	.329	.310	.778	**5.0**	**1.5**	.6	**.2**	6.6	6.6
Career		26	17	28.1	.376	.337	.923	4.5	1.2	.9	.1	7.7	7.0

=== Italian League ===
Year	Team	GP	GS	MPG	FG%	3P%	FT%	RPG	APG	SPG	BPG	PPG
2008–09	Milano	42	41	30.1	.429	.335	.745	7.6	1.1	2.0	.3	11.0
2009–10	Milano	39	25	25.8	.363	.284	.778	6.2	1.6	1.3	.4	7.1
2010–11	Teramo	5	5	37.6	.375	.348	.833	8.2	1.8	1.8	.2	10.8
Career		86	71	28.6	.400	.315	.763	7.0	1.3	1.7	.3	9.3
