= Universo Treviso Basket =

- Leagues: LBA
- Founded: 2012; 14 years ago
- History: Treviso Basket 2012 (2012–2014); Universo Treviso Basket (2014–present)
- Arena: PalaVerde
- Capacity: 5,344
- Location: Treviso, Veneto, Italy
- Team colors: White, blue, orange
- President: Matteo Contento
- Head coach: Marcelo Nicola
- Ownership: Consorzio Universo Treviso
- Championships: 1 Italian LNP Cup
- Website: trevisobasket.it
Home	Away

Universo Treviso Basket (diminutive TvB), known for sponsorship reasons as NutriBullet Treviso, is an Italian professional basketball club based in Treviso, Veneto. Founded in 2012, it plays in the Italian basketball first division Lega Basket Serie A (LBA) since the 2019–20 season. Despite being a distinct club, Universo Treviso de facto inherited the fanbase of Pallacanestro Treviso, the historic club of the town.

== History ==
=== 2012–2014: Beginnings ===
Following the Benetton family's planned withdrawal from professional basketball that would occur in July 2012 and see Benetton Treviso without backing, the Universo Treviso consortium was launched in March 2012 with the goal to assure the club's continued presence as a professional outfit. Former players, led by Riccardo Pittis who served as the consortium's guarantor, were at the basis of the initiative.

After overcoming some economic struggles, thanks to the efforts of Pittis, Claudio Coldebella and Paolo Vazzoler (who was named president), the consortium managed to obtain enough funding to create a new club on 4 July 2012, thanks to five local businessmen and the sixty-seven firms involved in the consortium. The new company, managing the club, Treviso Basket s.r.l., was given Benetton Treviso's sporting rights for free, though the latter had earlier withdrawn from the first division Serie A in order to apply for the amateur leagues (as a youth club). However, the Italian Basketball Federation (FIP), who decides which clubs are admitted into the national leagues, refused Treviso Basket's application to join the Serie A, a decision upheld by the Federal Court on 2 August 2012. The explanation by FIP's president Dino Meneghin was that admitting the newly created organisation would go against league rules and create an unsustainable legal precedent. Meneghin also bemoaned the lack of reaction since Benetton announced its withdrawal eighteen months beforehand and the fact that the two entities did not merge.

The club grown up slowly, winning the amateur Promozione (the seventh division) thanks to support from Benetton Treviso, which transferred them their Under 19 squad and personnel. Treviso Basket earned promotion to the Serie D by winning the 2012–13 championship playoffs. At the end of the season, the team got a wild card for the National Division B, the fourth level of the Italian championship. Treviso ended the regular season at the 4th place in the group, but it was immediately eliminated in the first round against APU Udine.

=== 2014–2018: Second league's powerhouse ===
After buying the sporting rights of B.N.B. Corato, Treviso moved to the Serie A2 Silver, the nominal third division, which was soon merged with the second division, Serie A2 Gold. The club also changed its name to "Universo Treviso Basket". Treviso arrived first in the Serie A2 Silver regular season, moving on to the joint Gold/Silver playoffs where they lost in the first round.

In the 2015–16 season, Treviso won the Eastern group of the Serie A2 championship, qualifying for the playoffs where it ousted Junior Casale and Ferentino, but it was eliminated in the semifinals by Fortitudo Bologna. In the 2016–17 season, led by coach Stefano Pillastrini, the team qualified for the playoffs as the front-runner in the Eastern group. The team eliminated Trapani in the first round, while in the quarterfinals it faced once again Fortitudo Bologna, being ousted 3–1. In the 2017–18 season, he ranked third in the Eastern group, qualifying for the fourth consecutive year to the second league's playoffs, where it eliminated Trapani 3–1 and Ferrara 3–0. However, it was ousted 3–0 in the semifinals by Pallacanestro Trieste.

=== 2018–2022: Menetti era ===
In June 2018, the club hired a new coach, Massimiliano Menetti. Menetti built up a good team, signing important players like David Logan, Amedeo Tessitori and Dominez Burnett, and renewing good Italian players like Matteo Imbrò. At the end of the regular season, Treviso arrived second behind Fortitudo. However, on 17 June 2019, after beating Benfapp Capo d'Orlando in the finals, it achieved the promotion to the Lega Basket Serie A (LBA).

== Arena ==
During the first two years of its existence, Treviso Basket played in the Centro Natatorio and PalaCicogna (in Ponzano Veneto) respectively. In 2014 it moved into the PalaVerde (capacity: 5,144), the state of the art former home of Benetton Treviso.

== Head coaches ==
- (Croatia) Goran Bjedov (2012–2014)
- (Italy) Gennaro Di Carlo (2014)
- (Italy) Stefano Pillastrini (2014–2018)
- (Italy) Massimiliano Menetti (2018–2022)
- (Argentina) Marcelo Nicola (2022–2023)
- (Italy) Francesco Vitucci (2023–2025)
- (Italy) Alessandro Rossi (2025)
- (Italy) Marcelo Nicola (2025–present)

== Players ==
=== Current roster ===
Note: Flags indicate national team eligibility at FIBA-sanctioned events. Players may hold other non-FIBA nationalities not displayed.

NutriBullet Treviso roster
Players
Coaches

Pos.	No.	Nat.	Name	Ht.	Wt.	Age
G	0	(Italy)	Cappeletti, Alessandro	1.86 m (6 ft 1 in)	85 kg (187 lb)	31 – 22 October 1995
G	2	(United States)	Carter Jr., Chico	1.91 m (6 ft 3 in)	87 kg (192 lb)	25 – 3 November 2000
F	3	(United States)	Chapman, Brekkott	2.06 m (6 ft 9 in)	97 kg (214 lb)	30 – 7 April 1996
PG	4	(United States)	Russell, DeWayne	1.80 m (5 ft 11 in)	70 kg (154 lb)	32 – 10 February 1994
C	7	(Italy)	Croswell, Ed	2.02 m (6 ft 8 in)	109 kg (240 lb)	27 – 6 September 1999
G	8	(Italy)	Manfredotti, Alessandro	1.92 m (6 ft 4 in)		17 – 12 December 2008
G	10	(Italy)	Vettori, Alessandro	1.91 m (6 ft 3 in)		18 – 16 March 2008
G/F	11	(Italy)	Miaschi, Federico	1.96 m (6 ft 5 in)	90 kg (198 lb)	26 – 26 April 2000
C	13	(United States)	Anigbogu, Ike	2.06 m (6 ft 9 in)	114 kg (251 lb)	28 – 17 October 1998
G/F	19	(Italy)	Allinei, Gregorio	1.94 m (6 ft 4 in)	90 kg (198 lb)	22 – 21 April 2004
F/C	26	(Italy)	Chillo, Matteo	2.03 m (6 ft 8 in)	104 kg (229 lb)	33 – 15 June 1993
G	30	(United States)	Senglin, Jeremy	1.88 m (6 ft 2 in)	86 kg (190 lb)	31 – 24 March 1995
SF	55	(United States)	Macura, J. P.	1.93 m (6 ft 4 in)	89 kg (196 lb)	31 – 5 June 1995
C	97	(France)	Chery, Valentin	2.01 m (6 ft 7 in)	95 kg (209 lb)	29 – 24 September 1997

Head coach

- (Italy) Marcelo Nicola

Assistant coach(es)

- (Italy) Alberto Morea
- (Italy) Domenico Chiariello

Physiotherapist(s)

- (Italy) Dario de Conti
- (Italy) Angelo Motta
- (Italy) Paolo Russo
- (Italy) Alberto Vascellari

Legend

- (C) Team captain
- Injured

- Roster
Updated: October 31, 2026

== Honours ==
- Serie A2 Silver (3rd tier) champions: 2015
- Serie A2 Basket (2nd tier) champions: 2019

== Sponsorship names ==
Throughout the years, due to sponsorship, the club has been known as:

- De' Longhi Treviso (2012–2021)
- Nutribullet Treviso (2021–present)
