= Basket Recanati =

Unione Sportiva Basket Recanati
- Nickname: USBR
- Leagues: Serie A2
- Founded: 1982
- Arena: PalaCingolani
- Capacity: 1,006
- Location: Recanati, Italy
- Team colors: Blue and Yellow
- President: Giuseppe Pierini
- Head coach: Giancarlo Sacco
- Championships: 1 Serie B
- Website: Official Site
Home	Away

Basket Recanati is an Italian basketball team from the town of Recanati.

== Honours ==
=== Domestic competitions ===
Serie B

- Winners (1): 2009–2010

== Notable players ==
- (United States) Isaiah Sykes (2014–2015)
- (United States) William Mosley (2014–2015)
- (United States) Ryan Pettinella (2013–2014)
- (Italy) Andrea Traini (2012, 2015–present)
- (Belgium) Dimitri Lauwers (2014–present)
