= Fortitudo Agrigento =

- Nickname: I Giganti
- Leagues: Serie B
- Founded: 1969
- Arena: PalaMoncada
- Capacity: 3,200
- Location: Agrigento, Italy
- Team colors: White, Blue
- Main sponsor: Moncada
- President: Salvatore Moncada
- Head coach: Michele Catalani
- Website: fortitudoagrigento.it
Home	Away

Fortitudo Agrigento is an Italian professional basketball team, based in Agrigento, Sicily. Founded in 1969, the side plays in the second division Serie A2 as of the 2015–16 season.

== History ==
Before the creation of Fortitudo Agrigento, there were many different teams in Agrigento. In 1968, one of these local teams achieved promotion to Serie C, but due to financial difficulties it soon had to leave the league.

In 1969, Fortitudo Agrigento was founded and started in the 7th-tier League, "Promozione", of the Italian basketball league system.

During the 1988–89 season, Fortitudo achieved promotion to Serie B beating Porto Empedocle, Cefalù, Catania and many other popular teams. In the next season, Fortitudo was relegated again to Serie C and decided to rebuild part of the team from the 1988–89 season with a new manager. At the end of the season Agrigento was again in Serie B.

From the 2007-08 season, Fortitudo Agrigento achieved a series of consecutive promotions until promotion to Serie A2 in 2012.

== Notable players ==
- (United States) Daeshon Francis
