= Basket Barcellona =

Orsa Basket Barcellona
- Leagues: Serie B
- Founded: 1976; 49 years ago
- Arena: PalAlberti
- Capacity: 3,000
- Location: Barcellona Pozzo di Gotto, Italy
- Team colors: Red, Gold

Orsa Basket Barcellona is an Italian professional basketball team based in Barcellona Pozzo di Gotto, Sicily. The team plays in the Serie B.

== Notable players ==
Note: Flags indicate national team eligibility at FIBA-sanctioned events. Players may hold other non-FIBA nationalities not displayed.

Criteria

To appear in this section a player must have either:

- Set a club record or won an individual award while at the club
- Played at least one official international match for their national team at any time
- Played at least one official NBA match at any time.

- (Canada) Jevohn Shepherd
- (United States) Troy Bell
- (United States) Taurean Green
- (United States) Joe Crispin
- (United States) Mike Green
- (Lithuania) Mindaugas Lukauskis
- (United States) JamesOn Curry
