= Unione Cestistica Casalpusterlengo =

UCC Assigeco Piacenza
- Nickname: Assigeco
- Leagues: Serie A2
- Founded: 1977; 49 years ago
- History: Unione Cestistica Casalpusterlengo (1977–present)
- Arena: Palabanca
- Location: Piacenza, Italy
- President: Franco Curioni (owner)
- Head coach: Stefano Salieri
- Website: www.assigecobasket.it
Home	Away

Unione Cestistica Casalpusterlengo, since 2016 known as Assigeco Piacenza, is an Italian professional basketball club based in Codogno, Lombardy.

== History ==
The team was founded in 1977 by Franco Curioni, who remains its president to this day. In 2004 Casalpusterlengo reached the third division Serie B1. Five years later the team was promoted to the professional LegaDue, playing two seasons before withdrawing in 2011 due to financial difficulties.

== Arena ==
In order to comply with the league's capacity regulations during the years it played in LegaDue, its home arena was PalaCastellotti in Lodi.

== Notable players ==
Note: Flags indicate national team eligibility at FIBA-sanctioned events. Players may hold other non-FIBA nationalities not displayed.

Criteria

To appear in this section a player must have either:

- Set a club record or won an individual award while at the club
- Played at least one official international match for their national team at any time
- Played at least one official NBA match at any time.

- (United States) Mike Hall 1 season: 2019–20
- (United States) Ruben Boykin 1 season: 2010–11
- (United States) Paul Marigney 1 season: 2010–11
- (United Kingdom) Peter Ezugwu 1 season: 2010–11
- (United States) Marcus Hatten 1 season: 2009–10
- (Italy) Mario Boni 2 seasons: 2006–08
- (Italy) Pietro Aradori 3 seasons: 2003–06
- (Italy) Danilo Gallinari 1 season: 2004–05
- (Albania) Klaudio Ndoja 2 seasons: 2003–05
- (Italy) Vittorio Gallinari 1 season: 1995–96
