= Pallacanestro Forlì 2.015 =

Basketball tean of Forlì, Italy

- Nickname: Biancorossi ("White-reds")
- Leagues: Serie A2
- Founded: May 2015; 11 years ago
- Arena: Unieuro Arena
- Capacity: 5,675
- Location: Forlì, Italy
- Team colors: White, red
- Main sponsor: Unieuro
- President: Giancarlo Nicosanti
- Head coach: Antimo Martino
- Championships: 1 Serie B LNP Cup
- Website: pallacanestroforli2015.it
Home	Away

Pallacanestro Forlì 2.015, also known as simply Forlì, are an Italian professional basketball club based in Forlì. Established in 2015, it plays its home games at the Unieuro Arena. The club currently plays in the Serie A2, the second tier of Italian basketball.

== History ==
The club was established in May 2015 to fill up the gap which was left after Fulgor Libertas Forlì was dissolved. Forlì 2.015 started playing in the Serie B Basket, Italy's third tier league. In its first season, Unieuro Forli won the Serie B LNP Cup after defeating Eurobasket Roma in the final.6 In the same season, Forlì managed to promote to the Serie A2 Basket.

== Honours ==
Serie B LNP Cup

- Winners (1): 2016

== Current roster ==
Note: Flags indicate national team eligibility at FIBA-sanctioned events. Players may hold other non-FIBA nationalities not displayed.

Pallacanestro Forlì 2.015 Unieuro roster
Players
Coaches

Pos.	No.	Nat.	Name	Ht.	Age
G	1	(Italy)	Berdini, Nicola	1.85 m (6 ft 1 in)	22 – 4 December 2003
G	3	(United States)	Sandford, Vincent	1.93 m (6 ft 4 in)	35 – 5 December 1990
F/C	7	(Cape Verde) (United States)	Santos-Silva, Marcus	2.01 m (6 ft 7 in)	29 – 7 June 1997
F/C	10	(Italy)	Gaspardo, Raphael	2.08 m (6 ft 10 in)	33 – 3 August 1993
G	12	(United States)	Carey, Donald	1.96 m (6 ft 5 in)	27 – 21 August 1999
SG	13	(Croatia)	Perković, Toni	1.91 m (6 ft 3 in)	28 – 10 April 1998
G/F	18	(Italy)	Pollone, Luca	1.97 m (6 ft 6 in)	29 – 15 April 1997
F	19	(Italy)	Ceccato, Mattia	1.98 m (6 ft 6 in)	19 – 8 June 2007
F	23	(Montenegro)	Josović, Andrija	2.05 m (6 ft 9 in)	20 – 29 January 2006
PG	24	(Italy)	Penna, Lorenzo	1.80 m (5 ft 11 in)	28 – 21 January 1998
PG	28	(Italy)	Flan, Franco	1.82 m (6 ft 0 in)	24 – 7 August 2002
G	30	(Italy)	Pinza, Tommaso	1.86 m (6 ft 1 in)	20 – 10 May 2006

Head coach

- (Italy) Antimo Martino

Assistant coach(es)

- (Italy) Andrea Fabrizi
- (Italy) Paolo Ruggeri
- (Italy) Lorenzo Grison

Legend

- (C) Team captain
- Injured

- Roster
Updated: 1 August 2026

== Notable players ==
- Shawn Dawson (born 1993), Israeli-American basketball player for Maccabi Ashdod of the Israeli Basketball Premier League
- Kalin Lucas (born 1989), American basketball player for Forlì, has played in the NBA
- Vincent Sanford (born 1990), American basketball player for Hapoel Galil Elyon of the Israeli Basketball Premier League
- Maurice Watson (born 1993), American basketball player for Maccabi Rishon LeZion of the Israeli Basketball Premier League
