= Legnano Basket Knights =

Legnano Knights
- Leagues: Serie A2
- Founded: 1966
- Arena: Knights Palace
- Location: Legnano, Lombardy, Italy
- Team colors: Red and white
- Website: legnanobasket.towersport.com
Home	Away	Third

Legnano Knights, for sponsorship reasons named FCL Contract Legnano, is an Italian professional basketball club based in Legnano. It plays in the second division Serie A2 as of the 2017-18 season.

== Team main sponsors ==
- 1966–1987: none
- 1987–1990: Entremont
- 1990–2004: Merlett Tecnoplastic
- 2004–2005: none
- 2005–2009: Forgiatura Marcora
- 2009–2013: Royal
- 2013–2017: Europromotion
- 2017–present: FCL Contract

== Notable players ==
- (Italy) Andrea Bianchi
- (Italy) Roberto Cazzaniga
- (Italy) Fabio Di Bella
- (Albania) Rei Pullazi
- (The Gambia) (United States) Ousman Krubally
