= Pallacanestro Mantovana =

Italian professional basketball team

- Nickname: Stings
- Leagues: Serie A2
- Founded: 2004; 21 years ago
- Arena: PalaBam
- Capacity: 5,000
- Location: Mantua, Italy
- Main sponsor: Dinamica Generale
- President: Marco Prandi
- Head coach: Alberto Martelossi
- Website: stings.it
Home	Away

Pallacanestro Mantovana, known for sponsorship reasons as Dinamica Mantova, is an Italian professional basketball team based in Mantua, Lombardy. Founded in 2004, the side plays in the second division Serie A2 as of the 2015–16 season.

The team is also known as Stings Mantova, because the bee is its historic corporate symbol.

== History ==
In 2004, with an agreement between Pallacanestro Mirandola and Polisportiva Poggese Basket, the A.D. Pallacanestro Primavera Mirandola was born.

In 2010–11 it achieved the historic promotion to Serie B.

In 2013–14 Mantova was relegated to DNA Silver. At the beginning of this season, the name of the team was changed to Pallacanestro Mantova.

After a great season it achieved the promotion in DNA Gold. In the 2014–15 season, it returned to the Serie A2 Basket.
