= Basket Ferentino =

- Leagues: Serie A2
- Founded: 1977; 48 years ago
- Arena: Palazzetto Ponte Grande
- Capacity: 2,000
- Location: Ferentino, Italy
- Team colors: Amaranth purple and White
- Main sponsor: FMC
- President: Vittorio Ficchi
- Head coach: Luca Ansaloni
- Website: basketferentino.it
Home	Away

Basket Ferentino is an Italian professional basketball team based in Ferentino, Lazio. Founded in 1977, the side plays in the second division Serie A2 as of the 2015-16 season

== History ==
Basket Ferentino was founded in 1977. At first it played the regional tournaments until 1987, when it achieved the promotion for the first time in Serie D. In 1989 recede in the Promotion League where he remained for two seasons. It returned to Serie D in 1992 and remains in this category until 1998 when it won the championship and the promotion to the Serie C2 and later in 2000 to Serie C1.

In the 2005-2006 season Ferentino was promoted in Serie B2 instead of Cagliari, During That season it won the championship and the promotion to Serie B1.

Participates to the Serie A2 Silver during the 2008-2009 season. In the 2011-2012 season Ferentino achieved the proportion to Serie A2 Basket.

== Notable players ==
Note: Flags indicate national team eligibility at FIBA-sanctioned events. Players may hold other non-FIBA nationalities not displayed.

Criteria

To appear in this section a player must have either:

- Set a club record or won an individual award while at the club
- Played at least one official international match for their national team at any time
- Played at least one official NBA match at any time.

- (United States) Omar Thomas
- (United States) Marcus Gilbert
