= A.S. Junior Pallacanestro Casale =

Junior Casale Monferrato
- Leagues: Serie B Interregionale
- Founded: 1956; 70 years ago
- Arena: PalaFerraris
- Capacity: 3,508
- Location: Casale Monferrato, Piedmont, Italy
- President: Giancarlo Cerutti
- Head coach: Antonello Arioli
- Website: asjunior.com
Home	Away

Associazione Sportiva Junior Libertas Pallacanestro Casale Monferrato, commonly known as Junior Casale is an Italian professional basketball team based in Casale Monferrato, Piedmont. It plays in the Italian fourth division Serie B Interregionale.

The team plays its home games in the PalaFerraris, which has a capacity of 3,508 people.

== History ==
Associazione Sportiva Junior Libertas Pallacanestro was founded in 1956 and took part in the regional Prima Divisione that same season. It reached the second division in less than ten years. Back in the fourth division Serie B2 in 2000–01, the club earned a promotion to the Serie B d'Eccellenza that season. Winning that league's cup in 2005, Junior was promoted to the second division LegaDue as well after beating Forlì in the playoff finals on 2 June 2005. The side would reach the promotion playoffs five times in the next six seasons, with two semifinal exits their best results until 2010-11 where they won the regular season before downing Reyer Venezia in the final to move up to the first division Serie A. The club would be relegated after one season, finishing last in 2011–12.

== Honors ==
- Coppa Italia LNP

Winners (1): 2005

== Notable players ==
Note: Flags indicate national team eligibility at FIBA-sanctioned events. Players may hold other non-FIBA nationalities not displayed.

Criteria

To appear in this section a player must have either:

- Set a club record or won an individual award while at the club
- Played at least one official international match for their national team at any time
- Played at least one official NBA match at any time.

- (United States) Ronald Slay 1 season: '05-'06
- (United States) Tiras Wade 1 season: '05-'06
- (Canada) Alex Bougaieff 1 season: '05-'06
- (United States) Michael Johnson 1 season: '05-'06
- (United States) Cameron Bennerman 1 season: '06-'07
- (Lithuania) Mindaugas Katelynas 1 season: '06-'07
- (United States) Troy Bell 1 season: '07-'08
- (United States) Zabian Dowdell 1 season: '08-'09
- (Dominica) Otis George 2 seasons: '06-'08
- (Italy) Matteo Formenti 7 seasons: '02-'09
- (Austria) Bernd Volcic 1 season: '07-'08
- (United States) Ricky Hickman 1 season: '10-'11
- (United States) Garrett Temple 1 season: '11-'12
- (Lithuania) Povilas Butkevičius 2 season: '12-'13, '14-'15

== Head coaches ==
- (Italy) Marco Crespi 6 seasons: '06-'12

== Sponsorship names ==
Throughout the years, due to sponsorship deals, it has been also known as:

- Krumiri Casale Monferrato (2003)
- Bistefani Casale Monferrato (2003-2004)
- Curtiriso Casale Monferrato (2005-2006)
- Junior Casale Monferrato (2006-2007)
- Fastweb Junior Casale (2007-2011)
- Novipiù Casale Monferrato (2011–2020)
- Junior Casale Monferrato (2020-present)
