= Serie B Basket =

Basketball league in Italy

- Formerly: Serie B Basket 1937–38 to 1954–55 (2nd tier); Serie B Basket 1955–56 to 1964–65 (3rd tier); Serie B Basket 1965–66 to 1973–74 (2nd tier); Serie B Basket 1974–75 to 1985–86 (3rd tier); Serie B2 Basket 1986–87 to 2007–08 (4th tier); Serie B Amateurs Basket 2008–09 to 2010–11 (4th tier); National B Division Basket 2011–12 to 2013–14 (4th tier); Serie B Basket 2014–15 to present (3rd tier)
- Sport: Basketball
- First season: 1937–38
- No. of teams: 64
- Country: Italy
- Level on pyramid: 3rd tier
- Promotion to: Serie A2 Basket
- Relegation to: Serie C Gold Basket
- Domestic cup: Italian LNP Cup
- Website: legapallacanestro.com (in Italian)

Serie B Basket is the third-tier league of professional men's basketball in Italy. Promoted teams are elevated to the Serie A2.

== Format ==
Teams are divided into four groups by geographical contiguity. Promoted teams gain access to the second-tier Serie A2 Basket, while relegated teams get demoted to play in the Serie C Gold Basket.

== History ==
Serie B Basket first began in the 1937–38 season as the second level of the Italian basketball league system, and it remained the 2nd-tier level of the Italian basketball pyramid until the 1954–55 season. Serie B Basket was downgraded to being the third-tier level on the Italian basketball pyramid from the 1955–56 season, until the 1964–65 season. From the 1965–66 season, through the 1973–74 season, it was once again the second-tier level on the Italian basketball pyramid, being one tier below the Serie A Basket.

Serie B Basket was then once again downgraded to being the third-tier level league on the Italian basketball pyramid from the 1974–75 season, through the 1985–86 season. With the creation of the Serie B Excellence (Italian: Serie B d'Eccellenza), Serie B2 was downgraded to being the fourth-tier level on the Italian basketball pyramid, and was renamed to Serie B2 Basket.

From 2008 to 2011, the league was known as Serie B Amateurs Basket (Italian: Serie B Dilettanti Basket). From 2011 to 2014, the league was known as the National B Division Basket (Italian: Divisione Nazionale B Basket). Since 2014, the league has once again been known as the Serie B Basket, and has once again been the third-tier level on the Italian basketball pyramid.

== See also ==
- Italian LNP Cup
