= Serie A2 (basketball) =

Professional men's basketball league in Italy

- Organising body: Lega Nazionale Pallacanestro (LNP)
- Founded: 1974; 52 years ago
- First season: 1974–75
- Country: Italy
- Confederation: FIBA Europe
- Number of teams: 20
- Level on pyramid: 2
- Promotion to: LBA
- Relegation to: Serie B
- Domestic cup: Coppa Italia LNP
- Supercup: Supercoppa LNP
- Most championships: 18 teams (1 title each)
- TV partners: LNP
- Website: legapallacanestro.com

Serie A2, known for sponsorship reasons as Serie A2 Old Wild West, is a men's basketball league in Italy. It constitutes the second-tier of the Italian league pyramid, below the first division LBA and above the third division Serie B, with promotion/relegation occurring between these leagues.

It is run by the Lega Nazionale Pallacanestro (LNP), itself regulated by the FIP, the Italian federation.

== Names ==
- 1974–2001: Serie A2
- 2001–2013: LegaDue Basket
- 2013–2014: Divisione Nazionale A Gold Basket
- 2014–present: Serie A2

== History ==
Logo used from 2013 until 2019

The league was created in May 1974, by the Lega Basket, the organisation in charge of running the LBA (to this day), that decided to create a new second division with 10 clubs. The two that were relegated during that season, and 8 from the now-former second tier Serie B, chosen with an on and off the court criteria.

The 1975–76 season saw 12 clubs take part, after a complicated system had seen a transfer of clubs from the Serie A1 to the A2.

In June 2001, the LegaDue was created to replace the Serie A2. Lega Basket now took part in running the league, though a system of promotion and relegation between the leagues remained.

During the 2013 summer, another revamp was decided. The LegaDue was amalgamated with the third division DNA, to form a two-tiered league, the DNA (Divisione Nazionale A) Gold and DNA Silver. The two DNA's had separate season's, but the first ranked team in DNA Silver joined the seven best Gold teams to compete for the single promotion spot in the Serie A. The next best eight Silver squads fought for one spot in the next Gold season, whilst the three worst teams were relegated.

The next season saw the league retake its Serie A2 moniker, keeping a similar but tweaked hybrid model, with the eight best Gold and the four best Silver teams taking part in the promotion playoffs (still for the one spot), whilst the last two Gold and the penultimate and ante-penultimate Silver squads play a relegation play out (the last ranked Silver team was relegated outright).

== Competition format ==
For the 2015–16 season, the Serie A2 Basket is composed of 32 teams with a regional subdivision in two equal groups of sixteen, East and West.

Each team plays the others in its subgroup twice, the first ranked team of each group then plays the eighth ranked team of the other group (e.g. East #1 against West #8), then the second best against the seventh, and so on, to form a promotion playoffs (for one place) of sixteen teams.

Since the 2018–19 season the Playoffs winner is the third promoted team to LBA. The two other promoted clubs, which are also the top seeded on the League Table at the end of the Regular Season, have to face a final of two matches to decide the winner of the Serie A2.

Since the 2019–20 season the Playoffs winners (2 tournaments) are promoted to LBA.

== Current clubs (2024–2025) ==
Team	City
Avellino Basket	Avellino
Fortitudo Bologna	Bologna
New Basket Brindisi	Brindisi
Pallacanestro Cantù	Cantù
Benedetto XIV Cento	Cento
UEB Cividale	Cividale del Friuli
Juvi Cremona 1952	Cremona
Pallacanestro Forlì	Forlì
Libertas Livorno	Livorno
Urania Milano	Milan
Nardò Basket	Nardò
OrziBasket	Orzinuovi
Victoria Libertas Pesaro	Pesaro
Unione Cestistica Casalpusterlengo	Piacenza
Real Sebastiani Rieti	Rieti
Rinascita Basket Rimini	Rimini
Basket Torino	Turin
APU Udine	Udine
Scaligera Basket Verona	Verona
Nuova Pallacanestro Vigevano 1955	Vigevano

== League champions ==
Season	Champions	Other promoted team
2001–02	Pastificio di Nola Napoli	–
2002–03	Sanic Teramo	Pallacanestro Messina
2003–04	Bipop Reggio Emilia	Sicc Cucine Jesi
2004–05	Upea Capo d'Orlando	Caffè Maxim Bologna
2005–06	Eurorida Scafati	Premiata Montegranaro
2006–07	Sebastiani Rieti	Scavolini Pesaro
2007–08	Carife Ferrara	Pepsi Caserta
2008–09	Pallacanestro Varese	Vanoli Soresina
2009–10	Enel Brindisi	Dinamo Sassari
2010–11	A.S. Junior Pallacanestro Casale	Reyer Venezia
2011–12	Trenkwalder Reggio Emilia	Enel Brindisi
2012–13	Pistoia Basket 2000	–
2013–14	Aquila Basket Trento	–
2014–15	Manital Torino	–
2015–16	Centrale del Latte Brescia	–
2016–17	Segafredo Virtus Bologna	–
2017–18	Alma Pallacanestro Trieste	–
2018–19	Lavoropiù Fortitudo Bologna	Virtus Roma & Treviso
2019–20	Not assigned (Note: Due to the COVID-19 pandemic)	–
2020–21	GeVi Napoli & Bertram Tortona	–
2021–22	Scaligera Verona	–
2022–23	Vanoli Basket	Giorgio Tesi Group Pistoia
2023–24	Pallacanestro Trieste & Trapani Shark	–
2024–25	APU Udine	Acqua S.Bernardo Cantù
2025–26	Givova Scafati	

== MVP ==
Season	MVP	Team
2009–10	(United States) Omar Thomas	New Basket Brindisi
2010–11	(United States) Ricky Hickman	Junior Casale
2011–12	(United States) Dwight Hardy	Pistoia Basket
2012–13	(United States) Casper Ware	Junior Casale
2013–14	(Italy) Davide Pascolo	Aquila Basket Trento
2014–15	(United States) Darryl Monroe	Tezenis Verona
2015–16	(United States) Damian Hollis	Centrale del Latte Brescia

== Best Coach ==
Season	Coach	Team
2003–04	(Italy) Fabrizio Frates	Pallacanestro Reggiana
2004–05	(Italy) Giovanni Perdichizzi	Orlandina Basket
2005–06	(Italy) Luca Dalmonte	Basket Club Ferrara
2006–07	(Italy) Giampiero Ticchi	Basket Rimini Crabs
2007–08	(Italy) Sandro Dell'Agnello	Basket Livorno
2008-09	(Italy) Andrea Trinchieri	Veroli Basket
2009–10	(Italy) Luigi Garelli	Nuova Pallacanestro Vigevano
2010–11	(Italy) Giulio Griccioli	Scafati Basket
2011–12	(Italy) Massimiliano Menetti	Pallacanestro Reggiana
2012–13	(Italy) Alberto Martelossi	Basket Brescia Leonessa
2013–14	(Italy) Maurizio Buscaglia	Aquila Basket Trento
2014–15	(Italy) Alessandro Ramagli	Scaligera Basket Verona
2015–16	(Italy) Eugenio Dalmasson	Trieste
2019–20	NOT ASSIGNED	
2020–21	(Italy) Alessandro Ramagli	Scaligera Basket Verona

== Topscorers ==
=== By scoring average ===
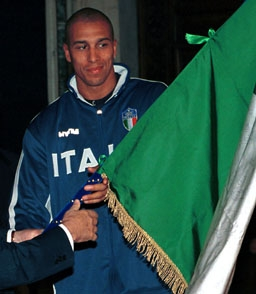
Carlton Myers, 1995 Italian A2 scoring champion.

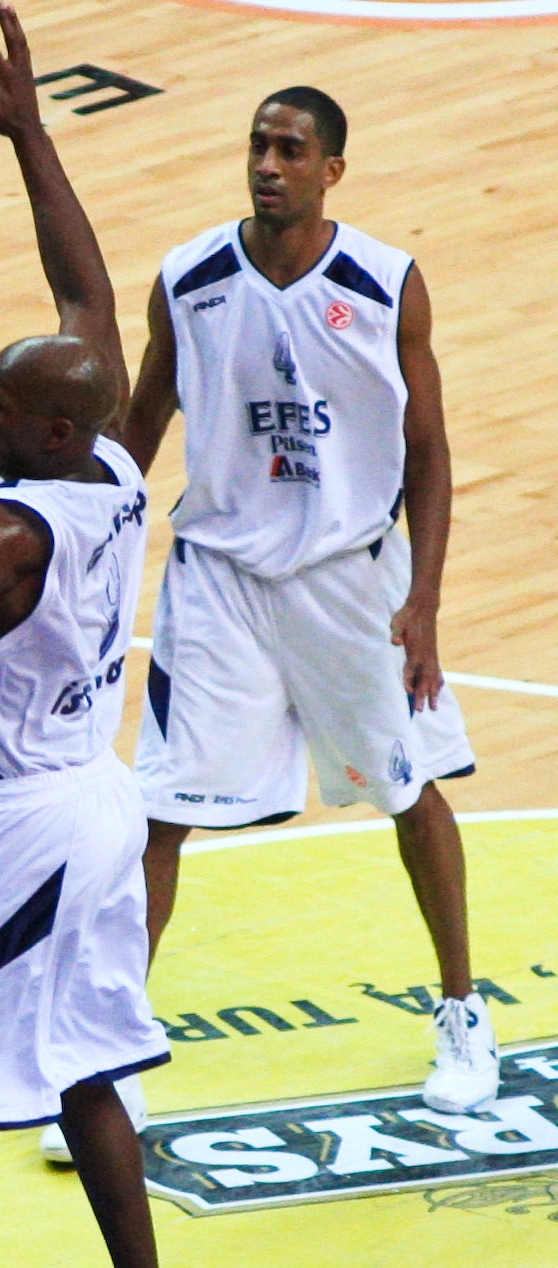
Drew Nicholas, 2004 Italian A2 scoring champion.

Regular season, play-offs not included.

Top scorers by scoring average (1987–88 to present)
Season	Player (league's top scorer)	Club	Scoring average
1982–83	(United States) Roscoe Pondexter	Cover Jeans Roseto	30.7
1983–84	(Socialist Federal Republic of Yugoslavia) Dražen Dalipagić	Gedeco Udine	29.1
1984–85	(United States) Joe Bryant	Rieti	32.6
1985–86	(United States) Joe Bryant	Rieti	37.6
1986–87	(United States) Joe Bryant	Reggio Calabria	33.3
1987–88	(United States) Joe Bryant (4×)	Pistoia	36.3
1988–89	(Socialist Federal Republic of Yugoslavia) Dražen Dalipagić (2×)	Glaxo Verona	35.3
1988–90	(United States) Mike Mitchell	Filodoro Brescia	32.4
1990–91	(Brazil) Oscar Schmidt	Pavia	43.6
1991–92	(United States) (Republic of Ireland) Ron Rowan	Pistoia	31.9
1992-93	(Brazil) Oscar Schmidt (2×)	Pavia	39.2
1993–94	(Croatia) Arijan Komazec	Pallacanestro Varese	31.8
1994–95	(Italy) Carlton Myers	Rimini	30.5
1995–96	(United States) Mike Mitchell (2×)	Pallacanestro Reggiana	32.8
1996–97	(United States) Kareem Townes	Juvecaserta	26.8
1997–98	(United States) Steve Burtt	Imola	27.9
1998–99	(United States) Rodney Monroe	Termal Imola	25.1
1999–00	(United States) Rodney Monroe (2×)	Fabriano Basket	21.8
2000–01	(United States) Antonio Granger	Pallacanestro Biella	25.6
2001–02	(United States) Horace Jenkins	C.S. Borgomanero	30.4
2002-03	(Italy) Mario Boni	Teramo Basket	29.2
2003–04	(United States) Drew Nicholas	Fabriano Basket	27.1
2004-05	(Italy) Vincenzo Esposito	Imola	26.9
2005-06	(United States) Sean Colson	JuveCaserta	30.6
2006-07	(United States) Lionel Chalmers	Dinamo Sassari	26.7
2007-08	(United States) Tim Pickett	Termal Imola	22.6
2008-09	(United States) Joe Bunn	Termal Imola	23.2
2009-10	(United States) Trent Whiting	Termal Imola	22.3
2010-11	(United States) Trent Whiting (2×)	Termal Imola	22.4
2011-12	(United States) Troy Bell	Azzurro Napoli Basket	23.2

Source: LegaBasket.it STATISTICHE (in Italian).

== Distinctions ==
These players have played in the Serie A2.

=== FIBA Hall of Fame ===
- (Brazil) Oscar Schmidt
- (Socialist Federal Republic of Yugoslavia) Dražen Dalipagić

=== Basketball Hall of Fame ===
- (Brazil) Oscar Schmidt
- (Socialist Federal Republic of Yugoslavia) Dražen Dalipagić
- (United States) Bob McAdoo
- (United States) Alex English

=== FIBA's 50 Greatest Players (1991) ===
- (Brazil) Oscar Schmidt
- (Socialist Federal Republic of Yugoslavia) Dražen Dalipagić
- (Italy) Antonello Riva

=== Collegiate Basketball Hall of Fame ===
- (United States) Alex English
- (United States) Bob McAdoo

== See also ==
- Italian LNP Cup

== Sources ==
- Top scorers per season playbasket.it
