= 2019–20 Pallacanestro Trieste season =

Pallacanestro Trieste
2019-20 season
- President: Gianluca Mauro
- Head coach: Eugenio Dalmasson
- Arena: Allianz Dome
- LBA: season cancelled (16th)

The 2019–20 season is Pallacanestro Trieste's 45th in existence and the club's 2nd consecutive season in the top flight of Italian basketball.

== Overview ==
The 2019-20 season was hit by the coronavirus pandemic that compelled the federation to suspend and later cancel the competition without assigning the title to anyone. Trieste ended the championship in 16th position.

== Kit ==
Supplier: Adidas / Sponsor: Allianz

Home	Away

== Players ==
=== Current roster ===
Allianz Pallacanestro Trieste roster
Players
Coaches

Pos.	No.	Nat.	Name	Ht.	Wt.	Age
SF	0	(Italy)	Coronica, Andrea (C)	1.90 m (6 ft 3 in)	85 kg (187 lb)	31 – 19 August 1993
F/C	1	(United States)	Cooke, Derek	2.06 m (6 ft 9 in)	100 kg (220 lb)	33 – 23 August 1991
PF	3	(Croatia)	Perić, Hrvoje	2.01 m (6 ft 7 in)	102 kg (225 lb)	39 – 25 October 1985
PG	4	(Argentina)	Fernández, Juan	1.93 m (6 ft 4 in)	83 kg (183 lb)	35 – 22 July 1990
PG	6	(Italy)	Demarchi, Iacopo	1.84 m (6 ft 0 in)	70 kg (154 lb)	26 – 15 June 1999
SF	7	(United States)	Jones, DeQuan	2.03 m (6 ft 8 in)	100 kg (220 lb)	35 – 20 June 1990
G	9	(Georgia (country))	Hickman, Ricky	1.89 m (6 ft 2 in)	88 kg (194 lb)	39 – 1 September 1985
C	10	(Italy)	Cervi, Riccardo	2.14 m (7 ft 0 in)	115 kg (254 lb)	34 – 19 June 1991
SF	13	(United States)	Washington, Deron	2.03 m (6 ft 8 in)	97 kg (214 lb)	39 – 12 December 1985
PG	18	(Italy)	Cavaliero, Daniele	1.83 m (6 ft 0 in)	83 kg (183 lb)	41 – 10 January 1984
F/C	20	(Italy)	Da Ros, Matteo	2.04 m (6 ft 8 in)	93 kg (205 lb)	35 – 25 September 1989
C	25	(Panama)	Mitchell, Akil	2.06 m (6 ft 9 in)	107 kg (236 lb)	33 – 26 June 1992
SG	44	(United States)	Justice, Kodi	1.99 m (6 ft 6 in)	87 kg (192 lb)	30 – 3 April 1995

Head coach

- (Italy) Eugenio Dalmasson

Assistant coach(es)

- (Italy) Marco Legovich
- (Italy) Alessandro Cittadini

Legend

- (C) Team captain
- Injured

- Roster
Updated: March 8, 2020

Note: Flags indicate national team eligibility at FIBA-sanctioned events. Players may hold other non-FIBA nationalities not displayed.

=== Depth chart ===
Pos.	Starting 5	Bench 1	Bench 2
C	Akil Mitchell	Derek Cooke	Riccardo Cervi
PF	Hrvoje Perić	Matteo Da Ros
SF	DeQuan Jones	Deron Washington	Andrea Coronica
SG	Kodi Justice	Daniele Cavaliero
PG	Ricky Hickman	Juan Fernández	Iacopo Demarchi

6+6 format (colours: Italian or homegrown players; foreign players; young players)

=== Squad changes ===
==== In ====
No.	Pos.	Nat.	Name	Age	Moving from		Type	Ends	Transfer fee	Date	Source
1	F/C	(United States)	Derek Cooke	26	Hamilton Honey Badgers	(Canada)	1 year	June 2020	Free	14 July 2019	
33	PG	(United States)	Jon Elmore	26	Marshall Thundering Herd	(United States)	1 + 1 year	June 2020 + 2021	Free	24 July 2019	
25	C	(Panama) (United States)	Akil Mitchell	26	Boulazac Dordogne	(France)	1 + 1 year	June 2020 + 2021	Free	30 July 2019	
14	PF	(Georgia (country)) (Italy)	Giga Janelidze	26	Dinamo Cagliari	(Italy)	1 year	June 2020	Free	31 July 2019	
44	SG	(United States)	Kodi Justice	26	Zielona Góra	(Poland)	1 year	June 2020	Free	4 August 2019	
7	SF	(United States)	DeQuan Jones	26	Hapoel Holon	(Israel)	1 year	June 2020	Free	12 August 2019	
13	SF	(United States)	Deron Washington	34	Reyer Venezia	(Italy)	1 year	June 2020	Free	17 December 2019	
9	G	(Georgia (country)) (United States)	Ricky Hickman	34	Brose Bamberg	(Germany)	1 year	June 2020	Free	6 January 2020	
10	C	(Italy)	Riccardo Cervi	29	Pallacanestro Varese	(Italy)	2 years (opt. out 2020)	June 2021	Undisclosed	14 January 2020	
6	PG	(Italy)	Iacopo Demarchi	20	Luciana Mosconi Ancona	(Italy)	end of season	June 2020	Undisclosed	18 February 2020	

==== Out ====
No.	Pos.	Nat.	Name	Age	Moving to		Type	Transfer fee	Date	Source
11	PG	(United States)	Chris Wright	29	Twarde Pierniki Toruń	(Poland)	end of contract	Free	1 July 2019	
22	SG	(United States)	Jamarr Sanders	30	Gaziantep	(Turkey)	end of contract	Free	1 July 2019	
24	PF	(United States)	Justin Knox	30	Aquila Basket Trento	(Italy)	end of contract	Free	1 July 2019	
30	G/F	(Slovenia)	Zoran Dragić	30	ratiopharm Ulm	(Germany)	end of contract	Free	1 July 2019	
42	C	(United States)	William Mosley	30	Partizan	(Serbia)	end of contract	Free	1 July 2019	
55	C	(Italy)	Alessandro Cittadini	40	retired		end of contract	Free	1 July 2019	
33	PG	(United States)	Jon Elmore	26	Orlandina Basket	(Italy)	transfer	Undisclosed	14 January 2020	
12	G/F	(Latvia) (Italy)	Artūrs Strautiņš	21	Pallalcesto Amatori Udine	(Italy)	transfer	Undisclosed	23 January 2020	
14	PF	(Georgia (country)) (Italy)	Giga Janelidze	26	Napoli Basket	(Italy)	mutual consent	Undisclosed	10 February 2020	

==== Confirmed ====
No.	Pos.	Nat.	Name	Age	Moving from		Type	Ends	Transfer fee	Date	Source
0	SF	(Italy)	Andrea Coronica	31	youth team		12 years	June 2021	Free	2009	
20	PF	(Italy)	Matteo Da Ros	41	Scaligera Basket Verona	(Italy)	3 + 2 years	June 2021	Free	16 July 2016	
18	PG	(Italy)	Daniele Cavaliero	41	Pallacanestro Varese	(Italy)	2 + 1 years	June 2020	Free	25 April 2017	
4	PG	(Argentina) (Italy)	Juan Fernández	35	Breogán	(Spain)	2 + 3 year	June 2022	Free	23 June 2017	
3	F/C	(Croatia)	Hrvoje Perić	39	Reyer Venezia	(Italy)	1 + 2 year	June 2021	Free	13 July 2018	
12	G/F	(Latvia) (Italy)	Artūrs Strautiņš	26	Pallacanestro Orzinuovi	(Italy)	3 year	June 2021	Free	17 July 2018	

==== Coach ====
Nat.	Name	Age.	Last team		Type	Ends	Date	Source
(Italy)	Eugenio Dalmasson	68	Reyer Venezia (W)	(Italy)	9 + 3	2022	21 June 2010	

== Competitions ==
=== Serie A ===
Pos	Team	Pld	W	L	PF	PA	PD
13	De' Longhi Treviso	21	8	13	1620	1664	−44
14	Virtus Roma	21	7	14	1639	1787	−148
15	OriOra Pistoia	21	7	14	1559	1735	−176
16	Allianz Pallacanestro Trieste	21	6	15	1574	1690	−116
17	Carpegna Prosciutto Basket Pesaro	20	1	19	1583	1849	−266

Updated to match(es) played on 9 February 2020. Source: LBA
