= 2019–20 Pallacanestro Reggiana season =

Pallacanestro Reggiana
2019-20 season
- President: Maria Licia Ferrarini
- Head coach: Maurizio Buscaglia
- Arena: PalaBigi
- LBA: season cancelled (12th)

The 2019–20 season is Reggio Emilia's 46th in existence and the club's 9th consecutive season in the top flight of Italian basketball.

== Overview ==
The 2019-20 season was hit by the coronavirus pandemic that compelled the federation to suspend and later cancel the competition without assigning the title to anyone. Reggio Emilia ended the championship in 12th position.

== Kit ==
Supplier: Adidas / Sponsor: GrissinBon

| Home | Away | Away |

== Players ==
The team composition is the same as the last game played on February 9 before the interruption of the championship due to the coronavirus pandemic.

Dererk Pardon and Gal Mekel left the team before the early end of the season. The first due to an injury that compromised the rest of the season, while Mekel was transferred to Unicaja Málaga.

=== Current roster ===
Grissin Bon Reggio Emilia roster
Players
Coaches

| Pos. | No. | Nat. | Name | Ht. | Wt. | Age |
|---|---|---|---|---|---|---|
| G | 1 | (United States) | Johnson-Odom, Darius | 1.87 m (6 ft 2 in) | 98 kg (216 lb) | 35 – 29 September 1989 |
| PG | 2 | (United States) | Cherry, Will | 1.85 m (6 ft 1 in) | 80 kg (176 lb) | 34 – 8 February 1991 |
| SF | 3 | (Italy) | Fontecchio, Simone | 2.03 m (6 ft 8 in) | 95 kg (209 lb) | 29 – 12 September 1995 |
| C | 5 | (United States) | Pardon, Dererk (*) | 2.03 m (6 ft 8 in) | 106 kg (234 lb) | 28 – 1 October 1996 |
| PG | 7 | (Italy) | Candi, Leonardo | 1.90 m (6 ft 3 in) | 86 kg (190 lb) | 28 – 30 March 1997 |
| PG | 8 | (Italy) | Poeta, Giuseppe (C) | 1.90 m (6 ft 3 in) | 82 kg (181 lb) | 39 – 12 September 1985 |
| G/F | 9 | (Hungary) | Vojvoda, Dávid | 1.96 m (6 ft 5 in) | 93 kg (205 lb) | 34 – 4 September 1990 |
| PG | 15 | (Italy) | Soviero, Jacopo | 1.90 m (6 ft 3 in) | 82 kg (181 lb) | 24 – 12 January 2001 |
| C | 22 | (United States) | Owens, Josh | 2.06 m (6 ft 9 in) | 109 kg (240 lb) | 36 – 7 December 1988 |
| PF | 30 | (United States) | Upshaw, Reggie | 2.03 m (6 ft 8 in) | 103 kg (227 lb) | 29 – 7 April 1995 |
| G | 33 | (Italy) | Cipolla, Alessandro | 1.95 m (6 ft 5 in) | 94 kg (207 lb) | 25 – 16 February 2000 |
| PF | 35 | (Italy) | Diouf, Mouhamet | 2.06 m (6 ft 9 in) | 105 kg (231 lb) | 23 – 10 September 2001 |
| PG | 99 | (Israel) | Mekel, Gal (*) | 1.91 m (6 ft 3 in) | 87 kg (192 lb) | 37 – 4 March 1988 |

Head coach

- (Italy) Maurizio Buscaglia

Assistant coach(es)

- (Italy) Federico Fucà
- (Italy) Giuseppe Di Paolo

Legend

- (C) Team captain
- (*) Left the team after the last match
- Injured

- Roster
Updated: 5 March 2020

Note: Flags indicate national team eligibility at FIBA-sanctioned events. Players may hold other non-FIBA nationalities not displayed.

=== Depth chart ===
| Pos. | Starting 5 | Bench 1 | Bench 2 |
|---|---|---|---|
| C | Josh Owens |
| PF | Reggie Upshaw | Mouhamet Diouf |
| SF | Simone Fontecchio | Dávid Vojvoda |
| SG | Darius Johnson-Odom | Leonardo Candi | Alessandro Cipolla |
| PG | Will Cherry | Giuseppe Poeta | Jacopo Soviero |

6+6 format (colours: Italian or homegrown players; foreign players; young players)

=== Squad changes ===
==== In ====
| No. | Pos. | Nat. | Name | Age | Moving from | | Type | Ends | Transfer fee | Date | Source |
|---|---|---|---|---|---|---|---|---|---|---|---|
| 10 | F/C | (Italy) | Luca Infante | 37 | Eurobasket Roma | (Italy) | 1 year | June 2020 | Free | 20 June 2019 | |
| 8 | PG | (Italy) | Giuseppe Poeta | 33 | Auxilium Torino | (Italy) | 2 years | June 2021 | Free | 24 June 2019 | |
| 5 | C | (United States) | Dererk Pardon | 22 | Northwestern Wildcats | (United States) | 1 year | June 2020 | Free | 17 July 2019 | |
| 3 | SF | (Italy) | Simone Fontecchio | 23 | Olimpia Milano | (Italy) | 1 year | June 2020 | Free | 18 July 2019 | |
| 9 | G/F | (Hungary) | Dávid Vojvoda | 28 | Szolnoki Olaj | (Hungary) | 2 years (exit 2020) | June 2020 | Free | 19 July 2019 | |
| 30 | PF | (United States) | Reggie Upshaw | 24 | Andorra | (Spain) | 2 years (exit 2020) | June 2020 | Free | 30 July 2019 | |
| 33 | G | (Italy) | Alessandro Cipolla | 19 | Aurora Desio | (Italy) | 4 years | June 2023 | Free | 31 July 2019 | |
| 22 | C | (United States) | Josh Owens | 30 | Hapoel Jerusalem | (Israel) | 1 year | June 2020 | Free | 10 August 2019 | |
| 99 | PG | (Israel) (Poland) | Gal Mekel | 31 | Zenit Saint Petersburg | (Russia) | 2 years (opt-out 2020) | June 2021 | Free | 15 August 2019 | |
| 2 | PG | (United States) | Will Cherry | 28 | Olympiacos | (Greece) | end of season | June 2020 | Free | 26 January 2020 | |

==== Out ====
| No. | Pos. | Nat. | Name | Age | Moving to | | Type | Transfer fee | Date | Source |
|---|---|---|---|---|---|---|---|---|---|---|
| 4 | PG | (Italy) | Federico Mussini | 23 | V.L. Pesaro | (Italy) | end of contract | Free | 1 July 2019 | |
| 5 | PG | (United States) | Bryon Allen | 27 | Zadar | (Croatia) | end of contract | Free | 1 July 2019 | |
| 6 | G | (United States) (Georgia (country)) | Michael Dixon | 28 | Al Ittihad Alexandria | (Egypt) | end of contract | Free | 1 July 2019 | |
| 8 | G/F | (United States) | Patrick Richard | 29 | Cluj-Napoca | (Romania) | end of contract | Free | 1 July 2019 | |
| 9 | PF | (Spain) | Pablo Aguilar | 30 | Iberostar Tenerife | (Spain) | end of contract | Free | 1 July 2019 | |
| 10 | PF | (Italy) | Raphael Gaspardo | 25 | New Basket Brindisi | (Italy) | end of contract | Free | 1 July 2019 | |
| 12 | F/C | (France) | Darel Poirier | 21 | Windy City Bulls | (United States) | end of contract | Free | 1 July 2019 | |
| 14 | C | (Italy) | Riccardo Cervi | 28 | Pallacanestro Varese | (Italy) | end of contract | Free | 1 July 2019 | |
| 16 | C | (Austria) | Benjamin Ortner | 36 | Retired | | end of contract | Free | 1 July 2019 | |
| 18 | PG | (Spain) | Pedro Llompart | 37 | Lucentum Alicante | (Spain) | end of contract | Free | 1 July 2019 | |
| 19 | SF | (Italy) | Niccolò De Vico | 24 | Vanoli Cremona | (Italy) | end of contract | Free | 1 July 2019 | |
| 10 | F/C | (Italy) | Luca Infante | 37 | Pallacanestro Mantovana | (Italy) | transfer | Undisclosed | 28 January 2020 | |
| 5 | C | (United States) | Dererk Pardon | 23 | Free agent | | mutual consent | Free | 3 March 2020 | |
| 99 | PG | (Israel) (Poland) | Gal Mekel | 32 | Unicaj Málaga | (Spain) | transfer | Undisclosed | 5 March 2020 | |

==== Out on loan ====
- (Italy) Federico Bonacini at Pallacanestro Trapani
- (Italy) Alessandro Vigori at Pallacanestro Mantovana

==== Confirmed ====
| No. | Pos. | Nat. | Name | Age | Moving from | | Type | Ends | Transfer fee | Date | Source |
|---|---|---|---|---|---|---|---|---|---|---|---|
| 7 | PG | (Italy) | Leonardo Candi | 22 | Fortitudo Bologna | (Italy) | 5 year | June 2021 | Free | 22 June 2017 | |
| 1 | G | (United States) | Darius Johnson-Odom | 29 | Iowa Wolves | (United States) | 2 years (out. 2020) | June 2021 | Free | 25 March 2019 | |

==== From youth team ====
| No. | Pos. | Nat. | Name | Age | Moving from | Type | Ends | Transfer fee | Date | Source |
|---|---|---|---|---|---|---|---|---|---|---|
| 15 | PG | (Italy) | Jacopo Soviero | 19 | youth team | | | Youth system | 30 January 2020 | |
| | SG | (Italy) | Carlo Porfilio | 18 | youth team | | | Youth system | 6 March 2020 | |

==== Coach ====
| Nat. | Name | Age. | Previous team | | Type | Ends | Date | Replaces | | Date | Type |
|---|---|---|---|---|---|---|---|---|---|---|---|
| (Italy) | Maurizio Buscaglia | 55 | Aquila Basket Trento | (Italy) | 3 | 2022 | 7 June 2019 | (Italy) | Stefano Pillastrini | 19 May 2019 | mutual consent |

== Competitions ==
=== Serie A ===
| Pos | Team | Pld | W | L | PF | PA | PD | Qualification or relegation |
|---|---|---|---|---|---|---|---|---|
| 10 | Openjobmetis Varese | 19 | 9 | 10 | 1570 | 1522 | +48 | |
| 11 | S.Bernardo-Cinelandia Cantù | 20 | 9 | 11 | 1533 | 1580 | −47 | |
| 12 | Grissin Bon Reggio Emilia | 21 | 9 | 12 | 1741 | 1763 | −22 | Qualification for FIBA Europe Cup |
| 13 | De' Longhi Treviso | 21 | 8 | 13 | 1620 | 1664 | −44 | |
| 14 | Virtus Roma | 21 | 7 | 14 | 1639 | 1787 | −148 | |

Updated to match(es) played on 9 February 2020. Source: LBA
