= 2019–20 Virtus Roma season =

Virtus Roma
2019-20 season
- President: Claudio Toti
- Head coach: Piero Bucchi
- Arena: PalaLottomatica
- LBA: season cancelled (14th)

The 2019–20 season is Virtus Roma's 60th in existence and the club's 1st season in the Lega Basket Serie A after the promotion in the top flight of Italian basketball.

== Overview ==
Virtus Roma comes back to the Serie A after five years in Serie A2. Roma gained the promotion to the highest Italian league by ending the 2018–19 Serie A2 season at the first place in the West division.

The 2019-20 season was hit by the coronavirus pandemic that compelled the federation to suspend and later cancel the competition without assigning the title to anyone. Roma ended the championship in 14th position.

== Kit ==
Supplier: EYE Sport Wear

| Serie A Home | Serie A Away |

== Players ==
Due to the early conclusion of the season the new hire Corey Webster couldn't play any game, while Jaylen Barford, coming from Pesaro, was called only in the last game against Sassari.

=== Current roster ===
Pallacanestro Virtus Roma roster
Players
Coaches

| Pos. | No. | Nat. | Name | Ht. | Wt. | Age |
|---|---|---|---|---|---|---|
| SG | 0 | (United States) | Barford, Jaylen | 1.91 m (6 ft 3 in) | 92 kg (203 lb) | 29 – 23 January 1996 |
| F/C | 2 | (Italy) | Cusenza, Kevin | 2.00 m (6 ft 7 in) | 95 kg (209 lb) | 32 – 31 January 1993 |
| PF | 7 | (Bosnia and Herzegovina) | Alibegović, Amar | 2.06 m (6 ft 9 in) | 109 kg (240 lb) | 29 – 31 March 1995 |
| G | 9 | (New Zealand) | Webster, Corey (*) | 1.88 m (6 ft 2 in) | 86 kg (190 lb) | 36 – 29 November 1988 |
| SG | 10 | (Italy) | Rullo, Roberto | 1.93 m (6 ft 4 in) | 98 kg (216 lb) | 35 – 5 February 1990 |
| PG | 13 | (Italy) | Baldasso, Tommaso | 1.91 m (6 ft 3 in) | 88 kg (194 lb) | 27 – 29 January 1998 |
| F | 21 | (United States) | White, James | 2.01 m (6 ft 7 in) | 98 kg (216 lb) | 42 – 21 October 1982 |
| F/C | 22 | (Italy) | Pini, Giovanni | 2.03 m (6 ft 8 in) | 100 kg (220 lb) | 32 – 25 July 1992 |
| G/F | 25 | (United States) | Farley, Liam | 1.96 m (6 ft 5 in) | 89 kg (196 lb) | 30 – 20 September 1994 |
| SG | 34 | (Italy) | Spinosa, Giovanni | 1.86 m (6 ft 1 in) | 80 kg (176 lb) | 27 – 30 December 1997 |
| F/C | 41 | (United States) | Jefferson, Davon | 2.04 m (6 ft 8 in) | 100 kg (220 lb) | 38 – 3 November 1986 |
| SG | 44 | (United States) | Buford, William | 1.96 m (6 ft 5 in) | 98 kg (216 lb) | 35 – 10 January 1990 |
| SG | 77 | (Czech Republic) | Kyzlink, Tomáš | 1.98 m (6 ft 6 in) | 91 kg (201 lb) | 31 – 18 June 1993 |

Head coach

- (Italy) Piero Bucchi

Assistant coach(es)

- (Italy) Daniele Michelutti

Legend

- (C) Team captain
- (*) Joined the team before the
  interruption and never played
- Injured

- Roster
Updated: March 8, 2020

Note: Flags indicate national team eligibility at FIBA-sanctioned events. Players may hold other non-FIBA nationalities not displayed.

=== Depth chart ===
| Pos. | Starting 5 | Bench 1 | Bench 2 |
|---|---|---|---|
| C | Davon Jefferson | Kevin Cusenza |
| PF | Amar Alibegović | Giovanni Pini |
| SF | James White | Tomáš Kyzlink | Liam Farley |
| SG | William Buford | Roberto Rullo | Giovanni Spinosa |
| PG | Jaylen Barford | Tommaso Baldasso | Corey Webster |

6+6 format (colours: Italian or homegrown players; foreign players; young players)

=== Squad changes ===
==== In ====
| No. | Pos. | Nat. | Name | Age | Moving from | | Type | Ends | Transfer fee | Date | Source |
|---|---|---|---|---|---|---|---|---|---|---|---|
| 10 | SG | (Italy) | Roberto Rullo | 29 | Dinamo Cagliari | (Italy) | 1 year | June 2020 | Free | 17 July 2019 | |
| 3 | F | (United States) | Michael Moore | 25 | Borås Basket | (Sweden) | 1 year | June 2020 | Free | 18 July 2019 | |
| 22 | F/C | (Italy) | Giovanni Pini | 26 | Fortitudo Bologna | (Italy) | 1 year | June 2020 | Free | 23 July 2019 | |
| 11 | G | (United States) | Jerome Dyson | 32 | Bnei Herzliya | (Israel) | 1 year | June 2020 | Free | 26 July 2019 | |
| 41 | F/C | (United States) | Davon Jefferson | 32 | Capitanes de Arecibo | (Puerto Rico) | 1 year | June 2020 | Free | 29 July 2019 | |
| 77 | SG | (Czech Republic) | Tomáš Kyzlink | 26 | Reyer Venezia | (Italy) | 1 year | June 2020 | Free | 3 August 2019 | |
| 25 | G/F | (United States) | Liam Farley | 24 | Bowdoin | (United States) | 1 year | June 2020 | Free | 9 August 2019 | |
| 34 | SG | (Italy) | Giovanni Spinosa | 21 | Smit Roma | (Italy) | 1 year | June 2020 | Free | 9 August 2019 | |
| 44 | SG | (United States) | William Buford | 29 | Lavrio | (Greece) | 1 year | June 2020 | Free | 23 August 2019 | |
| 2 | F/C | (Italy) | Kevin Cusenza | 26 | Fortitudo Roma | (Italy) | 1 year | June 2020 | Free | 30 August 2019 | |
| 21 | F | (United States) | James White | 37 | Benedetto XIV Cento | (Italy) | 1 year | June 2020 | Free | 24 December 2019 | |
| 0 | SG | (United States) | Jaylen Barford | 24 | V.L. Pesaro | (Italy) | end of the season | June 2020 | Undisclosed | 19 February 2020 | |
| 9 | G | (New Zealand) | Corey Webster | 31 | Zhejiang Lions | (China) | end of the season | June 2020 | Free | 29 February 2020 | |

==== Out ====
| No. | Pos. | Nat. | Name | Age | Moving to | | Type | Transfer fee | Date | Source |
|---|---|---|---|---|---|---|---|---|---|---|
| 10 | G | (Italy) | Massimo Chessa | 23 | Napoli Basket | (Italy) | end of contract | Free | 1 July 2019 | |
| 11 | PG | (United States) | Nic Moore | 27 | Champagne Châlons-Reims | (France) | end of contract | Free | 1 July 2019 | |
| 12 | G/F | (Italy) | Daniele Sandri | 28 | Napoli Basket | (Italy) | end of contract | Free | 1 July 2019 | |
| 14 | SG | (Italy) | Andrea Saccaggi | 30 | Cestistica San Severo | (Italy) | end of contract | Free | 1 July 2019 | |
| 15 | F/C | (Italy) | Aristide Landi | 25 | Pistoia | (Italy) | end of contract | Free | 1 July 2019 | |
| 17 | G | (Italy) | Roberto Prandin | 33 | Scagliera Verona | (Italy) | end of contract | Free | 1 July 2019 | |
| 21 | F/C | (United States) | Henry Sims | 29 | Fortitudo Bologna | (Italy) | end of contract | Free | 1 July 2019 | |
| 33 | SF | (Italy) | Marco Santiangeli | 27 | Assigeco Piacenza | (Italy) | end of contract | Free | 1 July 2019 | |
| 3 | F | (United States) | Michael Moore | 25 | Latina Basket | (Italy) | transfer | Undisclosed | 30 December 2019 | |
| 11 | G | (United States) | Jerome Dyson | 32 | Fortitudo Bologna | (Italy) | transfer | Undisclosed | 26 February 2020 | |

==== Confirmed ====
| No. | Pos. | Nat. | Name | Age | Moving from | | Type | Ends | Transfer fee | Date | Source |
|---|---|---|---|---|---|---|---|---|---|---|---|
| 13 | PG | (Italy) | Tommaso Baldasso | 27 | Auxilium Torino | (Italy) | 3 + 3 years | June 2022 | Free | 13 July 2016 | |
| 7 | PF | (Bosnia and Herzegovina) (Italy) | Amar Alibegović | 29 | St. John's Red Storm | (United States) | 2 years | June 2020 | Free | 4 July 2018 | |

==== Coach ====
| Nat. | Name | Age. | Previous team | | Type | Ends | Date | Source |
|---|---|---|---|---|---|---|---|---|
| (Italy) | Piero Bucchi | 61 | JuveCaserta | (Italy) | 2 years | 2020 | 4 March 2018 | |

==== Unsuccessful deals ====
The following deal never activated and the player's contract was withdrawn before the beginning of the season.

| Signing date | Withdrawal date | Pos. | Nat. | Name | Age | Moving from | | Type | Moved to | |
|---|---|---|---|---|---|---|---|---|---|---|
| 16 July 2019 | 23 August 2019 | G | (United States) | Skyler Flatten | 24 | South Dakota State Jackrabbits | (United States) | 1 year | Miami Heat | (United States) |

== Competitions ==
=== Serie A ===
| Pos | Team | Pld | W | L | PF | PA | PD | Qualification or relegation |
|---|---|---|---|---|---|---|---|---|
| 12 | Grissin Bon Reggio Emilia | 21 | 9 | 12 | 1741 | 1763 | −22 | Qualification for FIBA Europe Cup |
| 13 | De' Longhi Treviso | 21 | 8 | 13 | 1620 | 1664 | −44 | |
| 14 | Virtus Roma | 21 | 7 | 14 | 1639 | 1787 | −148 | |
| 15 | OriOra Pistoia | 21 | 7 | 14 | 1559 | 1735 | −176 | |
| 16 | Allianz Pallacanestro Trieste | 21 | 6 | 15 | 1574 | 1690 | −116 | |

Updated to match(es) played on 9 February 2020. Source: LBA
