= 2019–20 Aquila Basket Trento season =

Aquila Basket Trento
2019-20 season
- President: Luigi Longhi
- Head coach: Nicola Brienza
- Arena: PalaTrento
- LBA: season cancelled (9th)
- EuroCup: Top 16

The 2019–20 season is Aquila Basket Trento's 25th in existence and the club's 7th consecutive season in the top flight of Italian basketball.

== Overview ==
Trento reached the Top16 of the EuroCup Basketball and ended the round with no wins.

The 2019-20 season was hit by the coronavirus pandemic that compelled the federation to suspend and later cancel the competition without assigning the title to anyone. Trento ended the championship in 9th position.

== Kit ==
Supplier: Spalding / Sponsor: Dolomiti Energia

| Home | Away |

== Players ==
=== Current roster ===
Dolomiti Energia Trento roster
Players
Coaches

| Pos. | No. | Nat. | Name | Ht. | Wt. | Age |
|---|---|---|---|---|---|---|
| F | 0 | (United States) | Kelly, Rashard | 2.03 m (6 ft 8 in) | 102 kg (225 lb) | 29 – 22 August 1995 |
| SG | 1 | (United States) | Blackmon, James | 1.93 m (6 ft 4 in) | 91 kg (201 lb) | 29 – 25 April 1995 |
| PG | 4 | (United States) | Craft, Aaron | 1.88 m (6 ft 2 in) | 85 kg (187 lb) | 34 – 12 February 1991 |
| SF | 5 | (Italy) | Gentile, Alessandro | 2.00 m (6 ft 7 in) | 100 kg (220 lb) | 32 – 12 November 1992 |
| PF | 7 | (Italy) | Pascolo, Davide | 2.02 m (6 ft 8 in) | 88 kg (194 lb) | 34 – 14 December 1990 |
| SG | 9 | (Italy) | Mian, Fabio | 1.96 m (6 ft 5 in) | 88 kg (194 lb) | 33 – 7 February 1992 |
| PG | 10 | (Argentina) | Forray, Andrés Pablo (C) | 1.87 m (6 ft 2 in) | 85 kg (187 lb) | 39 – 20 March 1986 |
| F/C | 13 | (United States) | Knox, Justin | 2.06 m (6 ft 9 in) | 110 kg (243 lb) | 36 – 13 January 1989 |
| F/C | 14 | (Italy) | Mezzanotte, Andrea | 2.08 m (6 ft 10 in) | 89 kg (196 lb) | 26 – 8 April 1998 |
| G | 20 | (Italy) | Voltolini, Alessandro | 1.90 m (6 ft 3 in) | 80 kg (176 lb) | 23 – 29 December 2001 |
| C | 23 | (Italy) | Ladurner, Maximilian | 2.06 m (6 ft 9 in) | 95 kg (209 lb) | 23 – 6 December 2001 |
| C | 25 | (Italy) | Lechthaler, Luca | 2.07 m (6 ft 9 in) | 115 kg (254 lb) | 39 – 23 February 1986 |
| SG | 34 | (Italy) | Picarelli, Matteo | 1.90 m (6 ft 3 in) | 80 kg (176 lb) | 23 – 26 May 2001 |

Head coach

- (Italy) Nicola Brienza

Assistant coach(es)

- (Italy) Emanuele Molin
- (Italy) Davide Dusmet

Legend

- (C) Team captain
- Injured

- Roster
Updated: January 28, 2020

Note: Flags indicate national team eligibility at FIBA-sanctioned events. Players may hold other non-FIBA nationalities not displayed.

=== Depth chart ===
| Pos. | Starting 5 | Bench 1 | Bench 2 | Bench 3 |
|---|---|---|---|---|
| C | Justin Knox | Luca Lechthaler | Andrea Mezzanotte | Maximilian Ladurner |
| PF | Rashard Kelly | Davide Pascolo |
| SF | Alessandro Gentile | Fabio Mian |
| SG | James Blackmon | Alessandro Voltolini | Matteo Picarelli |
| PG | Aaron Craft | Andrés Pablo Forray |

5+5 format (colours: Italian or homegrown players; foreign players; young players)

=== Squad changes ===
==== In ====
| No. | Pos. | Nat. | Name | Age | Moving from | | Type | Ends | Transfer fee | Date | Source |
|---|---|---|---|---|---|---|---|---|---|---|---|
| 0 | F | (United States) | Rashard Kelly | 23 | Parma Perm | (Russia) | 1 year | June 2020 | Free | 11 July 2019 | |
| 1 | SG | (United States) | James Blackmon | 24 | V.L. Pesaro | (Italy) | 1 year | June 2020 | Free | 19 July 2019 | |
| 13 | PG | (United States) | Justin Knox | 26 | Pallacanestro Trieste | (Italy) | 1 year | June 2020 | Free | 25 July 2019 | |
| 34 | SG | (Italy) (Switzerland) | Matteo Picarelli | 18 | Grasshopper Zürich | (Switzerland) | N/A | N/A | Youth system | 12 August 2019 | |
| 5 | SF | (Italy) | Alessandro Gentile | 26 | CB Estudiantes | (Spain) | 2 years | June 2021 | Free | 26 September 2019 | |

==== Out ====
| No. | Pos. | Nat. | Name | Age | Moving to | | Type | Transfer fee | Date | Source |
|---|---|---|---|---|---|---|---|---|---|---|
| 1 | G/F | (United States) | Devyn Marble | 26 | Golden State Warriors | (United States) | end of contract | Free | 1 July 2019 | |
| 12 | SG | (Italy) | Diego Flaccadori | 23 | Bayern Munich | (Germany) | end of contract | Free | 1 July 2019 | |
| 15 | SF | (Portugal) | João Gomes | 34 | Benfica | (Portugal) | end of contract | Free | 1 July 2019 | |
| 22 | C | (United States) | Dustin Hogue | 27 | Enisey Krasnoyarsk | (Russia) | end of contract | Free | 1 July 2019 | |
| 32 | C | (Serbia) | Nikola Jovanović | 25 | Crvena Zvezda | (Serbia) | return from loan | Free | 1 July 2019 | |
| 24 | SF | (United States) | George King | 26 | Basket Zielona Góra | (Poland) | transfer | Undisclosed | 17 January 2020 | |

==== Confirmed ====
| No. | Pos. | Nat. | Name | Age | Moving from | | Type | Ends | Transfer fee | Date | Source |
|---|---|---|---|---|---|---|---|---|---|---|---|
| 10 | PG | (Argentina) (Italy) | Andrés Pablo Forray | 33 | Fulgor Libertas Forlì | (Italy) | 7 + 3 year | June 2021 | Free | 22 February 2011 | |
| 25 | C | (Italy) | Luca Lechthaler | 33 | Scandone Avellino | (Italy) | 5 years | June 2020 | Free | 6 August 2015 | |
| 9 | SG | (Italy) | Fabio Mian | 27 | Pistoia | (Italy) | 2 year | June 2020 | Free | 21 June 2018 | |
| 14 | F/C | (Italy) | Andrea Mezzanotte | 21 | Blu Basket Treviglio | (Italy) | 4 year | June 2022 | Free | 23 July 2018 | |
| 7 | PF | (Italy) | Davide Pascolo | 28 | Olimpia Milano | (Italy) | 3 year | June 2021 | Free | 24 July 2018 | |
| 4 | PG | (United States) (Philippines) | Aaron Craft | 28 | Budućnost | (Montenegro) | 1 + 1 year | June 2020 | Free | 5 November 2018 | |

==== Coach ====
| Nat. | Name | Age. | Previous team | | Type | Ends | Date | Replaces | | Date | Type |
|---|---|---|---|---|---|---|---|---|---|---|---|
| (Italy) | Nicola Brienza | 39 | Pallacanestro Cantù | (Italy) | 3 | 2022 | 10 June 2019 | (Italy) | Maurizio Buscaglia | 30 May 2019 | mutual consent |

== Competitions ==
=== Serie A ===
| Pos | Team | Pld | W | L | PF | PA | PD | Qualification or relegation |
|---|---|---|---|---|---|---|---|---|
| 7 | Umana Reyer Venezia | 21 | 11 | 10 | 1638 | 1582 | +56 | Qualification for EuroCup |
| 8 | Pompea Fortitudo Bologna | 21 | 11 | 10 | 1624 | 1670 | −46 | Qualification for Champions League |
| 9 | Dolomiti Energia Trento | 21 | 11 | 10 | 1635 | 1665 | −30 | Qualification for EuroCup |
| 10 | Openjobmetis Varese | 19 | 9 | 10 | 1570 | 1522 | +48 | |
| 11 | S.Bernardo-Cinelandia Cantù | 20 | 9 | 11 | 1533 | 1580 | −47 | |

Updated to match(es) played on 9 February 2020. Source: LBA

=== EuroCup ===
==== Regular season ====
| Pos | Team | Pld | W | L | PF | PA | PD | Qualification |
|---|---|---|---|---|---|---|---|---|
| 1 | (Spain) Unicaja | 10 | 7 | 3 | 845 | 774 | +71 | Advance to Top 16 |
| 2 | (Turkey) Galatasaray Doğa Sigorta | 10 | 6 | 4 | 813 | 792 | +21 | Advance to Top 16 |
| 3 | (Germany) EWE Baskets Oldenburg | 10 | 6 | 4 | 840 | 850 | −10 | Advance to Top 16 |
| 4 | (Italy) Dolomiti Energia Trento | 10 | 5 | 5 | 797 | 817 | −20 | Advance to Top 16 |
| 5 | (Montenegro) Budućnost VOLI | 10 | 3 | 7 | 784 | 775 | +9 | |
| 6 | (Poland) Asseco Arka Gdynia | 10 | 3 | 7 | 710 | 781 | −71 | |

Source: EuroCup Basketball
Rules for classification: All points scored in extra period(s) were not counted in the standings, nor for any tie-break situation.

==== Top 16 ====
| Pos | Team | Pld | W | L | PF | PA | PD | Qualification |
|---|---|---|---|---|---|---|---|---|
| 1 | (Serbia) Partizan NIS | 6 | 5 | 1 | 489 | 418 | +71 | Advance to quarterfinals |
| 2 | (Italy) Segafredo Virtus Bologna | 6 | 4 | 2 | 519 | 488 | +31 | Advance to quarterfinals |
| 3 | (Turkey) Darüşşafaka Tekfen | 6 | 3 | 3 | 458 | 464 | −6 | |
| 4 | (Italy) Dolomiti Energia Trento | 6 | 0 | 6 | 413 | 509 | −96 | |

Source: EuroCup Basketball
Rules for classification: All points scored in extra period(s) were not counted in the standings, nor for any tie-break situation.
