= 2019–20 LBA season =

LBA
- Season: 2019–20
- Duration: October 25, 2019 – June 2020
- Games played: 186
- Teams: 17
- TV partners: Rai Sport, Eurosport

Regular season
- Top seed: Segafredo Virtus Bologna

Finals
- Champions: None declared

Records
- Biggest home win: Sassari 108–72 Roma (November 2, 2019)
- Biggest away win: Trieste 62–92 Varese (September 29, 2019); Roma 53-83 Brescia (December 22, 2019)
- Highest scoring: Brindisi 108–99 Pesaro (October 20, 2019)
- Winning streak: 10 games Segafredo Virtus Bologna
- Losing streak: 16 games Carpegna Prosciutto Pesaro
- Highest attendance: 10,003; AX Milano 90-78 Sassari (November 24, 2019)
- Average attendance: 581,082 (4,273 per match) (First half of the season)
- All statistics correct as of March 8, 2020.

The 2019–20 LBA season was the 98th season of the Lega Basket Serie A (LBA), the men's top tier professional basketball division of the Italian basketball league system. The regular season started on September 25, 2019, and was scheduled to finish on April 26, 2020. However, the season was cancelled prematurely because of the COVID-19 pandemic.

== Effects of the COVID-19 pandemic ==
On March 8, 2020, the Italian government halted the league until April 3, 2020, due to the coronavirus pandemic in Italy. On April 7, 2020, after a month of suspension, the Italian Basketball Federation officially ended the 2019–20 season. Virtus Bologna ended the season first, with 18 wins and 2 defeats, but the title was not assigned.

As in previous years, Molten Corporation provided the official ball for all matches.

Umana Reyer Venezia are the defending champions.

== Teams ==
=== Promotion and relegation (pre-season) ===
A total of 18 teams contest the league, including 15 sides from the 2018–19 season and three promoted from the 2018–19 Serie A2.

Teams promoted from Serie A2

- Fortitudo Pompea Bologna
- Virtus Roma
- De' Longhi Treviso

Fortitudo Pompea Bologna and Virtus Roma are the two promoted clubs from the Serie A2 Basket as they ranked first on the league table at the end of the Regular Season. They returned to the top division, respectively, following a hiatus 10 and 4 years. De' Longhi Treviso is the winner team of the 2019 Serie A2 Playoffs and is the third promoted club to LBA.

The three promoted clubs from Serie A2 replaced Fiat Torino, which were relegated during the previous season after deducted 8 points by the Federal Council due to financial irregularities.

On July 12, 2019, after the resignation of Sidigas Avellino to play in LBA for financial difficulties, the LBA agreed to play a 17-team league.

=== Venues and locations ===
Location of teams in 2019–20 LBA season

Team	Home city	Arena	Capacity
Allianz Pallacanestro Trieste	Trieste	Allianz Dome	6,943
AX Armani Exchange Milano	Milan	Mediolanum Forum	12,700
AX Armani Exchange Milano	Milan	Allianz Cloud	5,420
Banco di Sardegna Sassari	Sassari	PalaSerradimigni	5,000
Carpegna Prosciutto Basket Pesaro	Pesaro	Adriatic Arena	10,323
De' Longhi Treviso	Treviso	PalaVerde	5,134
Dolomiti Energia Trento	Trento	BLM Group Arena	4,360
Germani Basket Brescia	Brescia	PalaLeonessa	5,200
Grissin Bon Reggio Emilia	Reggio Emilia	PalaBigi	4,530
Happy Casa Brindisi	Brindisi	PalaPentassuglia	3,534
Openjobmetis Varese	Varese	Enerxenia Arena	5,100
OriOra Pistoia	Pistoia	PalaCarrara	4,000
Pompea Fortitudo Bologna	Bologna	PalaDozza	5,570
S.Bernardo-Cinelandia Cantù	Cantù	PalaBancoDesio (in Desio)	6,700
Segafredo Virtus Bologna	Bologna	PalaDozza	5,570
Segafredo Virtus Bologna	Bologna	Virtus Arena	8,970
Umana Reyer Venezia	Venice	Palasport Taliercio	3,506
Vanoli Cremona	Cremona	PalaRadi	3,511
Virtus Roma	Rome	PalaLottomatica	11,200

=== Personnel and sponsorship ===
Team	Head coach	Captain	Kit manufacturer	Shirt sponsor
Allianz Pallacanestro Trieste	(Italy) Eugenio Dalmasson	(Italy) Andrea Coronica	Adidas	Allianz
AX Armani Exchange Milano	(Italy) Ettore Messina	(Italy) Andrea Cinciarini	Armani	AX Armani Exchange
Banco di Sardegna Sassari	(Italy) Gianmarco Pozzecco	(Italy) Giacomo Devecchi	Eye Sport	Banco di Sardegna
Carpegna Prosciutto Basket Pesaro	(Italy) Giancarlo Sacco	(United States) Zach Thomas	Erreà	Carpegna Prosciutto
De' Longhi Treviso	(Italy) Massimiliano Menetti	(Italy) Matteo Imbrò	Erreà	De'Longhi
Dolomiti Energia Trento	(Italy) Nicola Brienza	(Argentina) Andrés Pablo Forray	Spalding	Dolomiti Energia
Germani Basket Brescia	(Italy) Vincenzo Esposito	(United States) David Moss	Erreà	Germani Trasporti, UBI Banca
Grissin Bon Reggio Emilia	(Italy) Maurizio Buscaglia	(Italy) Giuseppe Poeta	Adidas	Grissin Bon, Mapei
Happy Casa Brindisi	(Italy) Francesco Vitucci	(United States) Adrian Banks	Adidas	Enel
Openjobmetis Varese	(Italy) Attilio Caja	(Italy) Giancarlo Ferrero	Macron	Openjobmetis
OriOra Pistoia	(Italy) Michele Carrea	(Italy) Gianluca Della Rosa	Erreà	OriOra, Conad
Pompea Fortitudo Bologna	(Italy) Antimo Martino	(Italy) Stefano Mancinelli	Nike	Pompea
S.Bernardo-Cinelandia Cantù	(Italy) Cesare Pancotto	(Italy) Andrea La Torre	Eye Sport	Acqua S.Bernardo, Cinelandia
Segafredo Virtus Bologna	(Serbia) Aleksandar Đorđević	(Italy) Filippo Baldi Rossi	Macron	Segafredo Zanetti
Umana Reyer Venezia	(Italy) Walter De Raffaele	(Greece) Michael Bramos	Erreà	Umana
Vanoli Cremona	(Italy) Romeo Sacchetti	(Italy) Travis Diener	Erreà	Ferramenta Vanoli
Virtus Roma	(Italy) Piero Bucchi		Eye Sport	BMW

=== Managerial changes ===
Team	Outgoing manager	Manner of departure	Date of vacancy	Position in table	Replaced by	Date of appointment
OriOra Pistoia	(Italy) Paolo Moretti	End of contract	12 May 2019	Pre-season	(Italy) Michele Carrea	10 June 2019
Carpegna Prosciutto Basket Pesaro	(Italy) Matteo Boniciolli	Resigned	14 May 2019	Pre-season	(Italy) Federico Perego	14 June 2019
Germani Basket Brescia	(Italy) Andrea Diana	Mutual consent	17 May 2019	Pre-season	(Italy) Vincenzo Esposito	26 May 2019
Grissin Bon Reggio Emilia	(Italy) Stefano Pillastrini	Sacked	19 May 2019	Pre-season	(Italy) Maurizio Buscaglia	7 June 2019
S.Bernardo-Cinelandia Cantù	(Italy) Nicola Brienza	Sacked	28 May 2019	Pre-season	(Italy) Cesare Pancotto	14 June 2019
Dolomiti Energia Trento	(Italy) Maurizio Buscaglia	Sacked	30 May 2019	Pre-season	(Italy) Nicola Brienza	10 June 2019
AX Armani Exchange Milano	(Italy) Simone Pianigiani	Sacked	11 June 2019	Pre-season	(Italy) Ettore Messina	11 June 2019
VL Pesaro	(Italy) Federico Perego	Sacked	5 December 2019	17th (0–10)	(Italy) Giancarlo Sacco	5 December 2019

== Changes from 2018–19 ==
The 2019-20 edition of LBA, due to the expansion of the number of teams (from 16 to 18), will take place over 34 rounds and should start earlier than usual, September 25, 2019. Also, it will be the introduction of midweek matches, otherwise it would not be possible to end the season by June 9 (the date set by FIBA due to the pre-Olympic tournament starting July 3, 2020). More specifically, the first four days of the 2019-20 LBA, thanks to the double shifts, will take place from September 25, to the weekend of October 5–6, 2019. Four rounds in just 10 days.

Due to the expansion of the number of teams, at the end of the 2018–19 LBA season there were three promotions from the Serie A2 and just one relegation. For the next years, there will be two relegations and two promotions to maintain the number of clubs in LBA.

== Rules ==
Each team is allowed either five or seven foreign players under two formulas:

1. 5 foreigners plus #5 Italian players
2. 6 foreigners plus #6 Italian players

Each club can choose the 5+5 formula, that consists of five Italian players and five foreign players, or the 6+6 formula.

As in previous seasons, LBA clubs must play in arenas that seat at least 3,500 people.

== Regular season ==
In the regular season, teams play against each other home-and-away in a round-robin format. The eight first qualified teams will advance to the Playoffs, the last seven qualified teams will be eliminated, while the last two qualified teams will be relegated and replaced by the winner of the playoffs of the second-level Serie A2 Basket. The matchdays are from September 25, 2019, to April 26, 2020.

=== League table ===
Pos	Team	Pld	W	L	PF	PA	PD	Qualification or relegation
1	Segafredo Virtus Bologna	20	18	2	1719	1500	+219	Qualification for EuroCup
2	Banco di Sardegna Sassari	20	15	5	1703	1506	+197	Qualification for Champions League
3	Germani Basket Brescia	21	14	7	1707	1554	+153	Qualification for EuroCup
4	AX Armani Exchange Milano	21	14	7	1687	1555	+132	Already qualified for EuroLeague
5	Happy Casa Brindisi	21	13	8	1776	1696	+80	Qualification for Champions League
6	Vanoli Cremona	20	12	8	1627	1617	+10	
7	Umana Reyer Venezia	21	11	10	1638	1582	+56	Qualification for EuroCup
8	Pompea Fortitudo Bologna	21	11	10	1624	1670	−46	Qualification for Champions League
9	Dolomiti Energia Trento	21	11	10	1635	1665	−30	Qualification for EuroCup
10	Openjobmetis Varese	19	9	10	1570	1522	+48	
11	S.Bernardo-Cinelandia Cantù	20	9	11	1533	1580	−47	
12	Grissin Bon Reggio Emilia	21	9	12	1741	1763	−22	Qualification for FIBA Europe Cup
13	De' Longhi Treviso	21	8	13	1620	1664	−44	
14	Virtus Roma	21	7	14	1639	1787	−148	
15	OriOra Pistoia	21	7	14	1559	1735	−176	
16	Allianz Pallacanestro Trieste	21	6	15	1574	1690	−116	
17	Carpegna Prosciutto Basket Pesaro	20	1	19	1583	1849	−266	

Updated to match(es) played on 9 February 2020. Source: LBA

=== Positions by round ===
The table lists the positions of teams after completion of each round. In order to preserve chronological evolvements, any postponed matches are not included in the round at which they were originally scheduled, but added to the full round they were played immediately afterwards. For example, if a match is scheduled for round 13, but then postponed and played between rounds 16 and 17, it will be added to the standings for round 16. In italics, the team did not play any game in that round.

Team ╲ Round	1	2	3	4	5	6	7	8	9	10	11	12	13	14	15	16	17	18	19	20	21	22	23	24	25	26	27	28	29	30	31	32	33	34
Segafredo Virtus Bologna	5	3	2	1	1	1	1	1	1	1	1	1	1	1	1	1	1	1	1	1	1	1	1	1	1									
Banco di Sardegna Sassari	1	1	1	3	3	2	2	3	2	3	2	2	2	2	2	2	2	2	2	2	2	2												
Germani Basket Brescia	6	4	5	5	4	7	4	4	4	4	7	7	6	4	4	3	3	3	3	3	3	3												
AX Armani Exchange Milano	2	9	7	8	11	8	5	5	7	6	4	3	3	3	3	4	4	4	5	5	4	4												
Happy Casa Brindisi	10	8	4	2	2	4	3	2	3	2	3	5	4	7	7	5	7	5	4	4	6	5												
Vanoli Cremona	17	7	9	12	9	12	14	13	10	8	5	4	7	5	5	8	5	6	6	6	5	6												
Umana Reyer Venezia	8	11	12	9	13	9	13	10	13	10	12	10	12	10	8	6	8	8	7	7	7	7												
Pompea Fortitudo Bologna	4	5	8	4	7	5	7	9	6	5	6	6	8	6	6	7	6	7	9	8	8	8												
Dolomiti Energia Trento	3	2	6	7	14	11	10	6	9	13	8	12	14	14	12	10	11	10	12	10	9	9												
Openjobmetis Varese	16	10	3	6	8	6	9	12	11	12	10	13	11	13	9	12	9	11	8	11	10	10												
S.Bernardo-Cinelandia Cantù	7	6	10	13	10	14	8	11	14	14	15	14	13	12	11	11	10	9	10	12	11	11												
Grissin Bon Reggio Emilia	11	12	11	11	6	3	6	7	8	7	9	11	10	11	14	9	12	12	11	9	12	12												
De' Longhi Treviso	15	14	13	14	12	15	12	14	12	9	11	8	9	9	13	14	14	14	14	13	13	13												
Virtus Roma	12	16	14	10	5	10	11	8	5	11	13	9	5	8	10	13	13	13	13	14	14	14												
OriOra Pistoia	14	13	16	17	17	17	16	16	16	16	16	16	15	15	15	15	15	15	15	15	15	15												
Allianz Pallacanestro Trieste	9	17	17	15	15	13	15	15	15	15	14	15	16	16	16	16	16	16	16	16	16	16												
Carpegna Prosciutto Basket Pesaro	13	15	15	16	16	16	17	17	17	17	17	17	17	17	17	17	17	17	17	17	17	17	17	17	17	17	17							

Leader
Qualification to Playoffs
Relegation to Serie A2

Updated to match(es) played on 9 February 2020. Source: LBA

=== Results ===
Home \ Away	TRI	AXM	SAS	PES	TVS	TRE	BRE	REG	BRI	VAR	PIS	FBO	CTU	VBO	VEN	CRE	ROM
Allianz Pallacanestro Trieste	—	67–85	83–82		69–61		76–74		72–80	62–92		89–69	86–96	85–89	72–81		
AX Armani Exchange Milano	88–73	—	90–78		91–67	81–69	65–73	89–78	89–92	93–69	83–63					77–74	
Banco di Sardegna Sassari	59–65		—	99–79		87–90		100–81		93–87		86–80		91–77		84–74	108–72
Carpegna Prosciutto Pesaro	76–82	65–71	82–107	—		95–101		65–90	77–103			72–80	72–87	79–94		63–74	
De' Longhi Treviso		53–75	79–101		—		72–68	91–83		79–84	87–72	78–66				84–94	
Dolomiti Energia Trento	80–53		73–76	85–75	76–71	—	63–56	81–103	78–67		88–75		79–71	77–83	90–79	79–89	82–88
Germani Basket Brescia	76–74	78–72		101–74		92–66	—	90–82	82–86	91–74	86–74			80–82	70–64	91–76	
Grissin Bon Reggio Emilia	87–86					76–84	81–87	—		81–74	84–72		85–73	59–79	85–104	85–71	96–88
Happy Casa Brindisi		74–77	77–83	108–99	81–74		88–78	87–72	—		100–67		64–69		75–71		88–81
Openjobmetis Varese	91–85		52–74	103–87		81–86			102–78	—		83–60			93–91		99–69
OriOra Pistoia	76–72		70–78	91–79	75–86	71–74		86–79		91–60	—		77–69	78–88		84–71	67–81
Pompea Fortitudo Bologna		85–80		77–80	77–69	93–68	74–88	86–69	78–72	79–76	82–71	—			89–82		95–92
S.Bernardo-Cinelandia Cantù			70–87		77–74	78–72	82–93	75–92	92–93	74–67		82–84	—		81–77		74–76
Segafredo Virtus Bologna		83–70		106–89		84–79			99–87	87–80	90–60	94–62	89–70	—	75–70		74–67
Umana Reyer Venezia	78–73	70–71	55–54	98–92	79–73	79–69						80–70	76–46	71–83	—	67–55	79–77
Vanoli Cremona	88–78	82–78			89–87			95–93	93–89	93–72		80–73	54–78	78–66		—	103–92
Virtus Roma	82–72	73–79		92–83	69–81		53–83		63–87		80–81	79–75		68–97		97–94	—

Updated to match(es) played on 9 February 2020. Source: LBA
Legend: Blue = home team win; Red = away team win.
Matches with lighter background shading were decided after overtime.

== Statistical leaders ==
As of February 10, 2020.

=== Points ===
Rank	Name	Team	PPG
1.	(Israel) Adrian Banks	Happy Casa Brindisi	21.2
2.	(United States) Ethan Happ	Vanoli Cremona	18.0
3.	(Italy) Pietro Aradori	Pompea Fortitudo Bologna	16.8
4.	(United States) Terran Petteway	OriOra Pistoia	16.3
5.	(United States) Jaylen Barford	Carpegna Prosciutto Pesaro	16.0

=== Assists ===
Rank	Name	Team	APG
1.	(Serbia) Stefan Marković	Segafredo Virtus Bologna	6.7
2.	(Italy) Luca Vitali	Germani Basket Brescia	6.6
3.	(Serbia) Miloš Teodosić	Segafredo Virtus Bologna	6.1
4.	(Israel) Gal Mekel	Grissin Bon Reggio Emilia	5.6
5.	(United States) Aaron Craft	Dolomiti Energia Trento	5.2

=== Rebounds ===
Rank	Name	Team	RPG
1.	(United States) Jeremy Simmons	Openjobmetis Varese	9.3
2.	(United States) Henry Sims	Pompea Fortitudo Bologna	8.9
3.	(United States) Ethan Happ	Vanoli Cremona	8.9
4.	(United States) Davon Jefferson	Virtus Roma	8.3
5.	(Australia) Angus Brandt	OriOra Pistoia	7.9

=== Valuation ===
Rank	Name	Team	VPG
1.	(United States) Ethan Happ	Vanoli Cremona	23.4
2.	(United States) Henry Sims	Pompea Fortitudo Bologna	22.3
3.	(Israel) Adrian Banks	Happy Casa Brindisi	22.2
4.	(United States) Davon Jefferson	Virtus Roma	20.2
5.	(Croatia) Miro Bilan	Banco di Sardegna Sassari	19.7

=== Other statistics ===
Category	Player	Team	Average
Steals	(United States) Aaron Craft	Dolomiti Energia Trento	2.0
Blocks	(United States) Kevarrius Hayes	S.Bernardo-Cinelandia Cantù	2.6
Turnovers	(United States) Jerome Dyson	Virtus Roma	3.4
2P%	(United States) Josh Owens	Grissin Bon Reggio Emilia	69.9%
3P%	(Italy) Michele Vitali	Banco di Sardegna Sassari	51.9%
FT%	(Italy) Awudu Abass	Germani Basket Brescia	89.2%

=== Individual game highs ===
Category	Player	Team	Total	Opponent
Points	(United States) Josh Mayo	Openjobmetis Varese	32	Allianz Pallacanestro Trieste (Sep 29, 2019)
Points	(United States) John Brown	Happy Casa Brindisi	32	Carpegna Prosciutto Basket Pesaro (Oct 20, 2019)
Points	(United States) Wes Clark	S.Bernardo-Cinelandia Cantù	32	Allianz Pallacanestro Trieste (Dec 22, 2019)
Points	(United States) Terran Petteway	OriOra Pistoia	32	Carpegna Prosciutto Basket Pesaro (Dec 22, 2019)
Points	(United States) Kyle Weems	Segafredo Virtus Bologna	32	Pompea Fortitudo Bologna (Dec 25, 2019)
Points	(Israel) Adrian Banks	Happy Casa Brindisi	32	S.Bernardo-Cinelandia Cantù (Jan 12, 2020)
Rebounds	(United States) Henry Sims	Pompea Fortitudo Bologna	19	Carpegna Prosciutto Basket Pesaro (Jan 12, 2020)
Assists	(Serbia) Stefan Marković	Segafredo Virtus Bologna	14	OriOra Pistoia (Sep 29, 2019)
Assists	(Israel) Gal Mekel	Grissin Bon Reggio Emilia	14	Vanoli Cremona (Oct 13, 2019)
Steals	(United States) Kelvin Martin	Happy Casa Brindisi	6	Virtus Roma (Sep 29, 2019)
Steals	(United States) Vince Hunter	Segafredo Virtus Bologna	6	Pompea Fortitudo Bologna (Dec 25, 2019)
Blocks	(United States) Henry Sims	Pompea Fortitudo Bologna	7	Happy Casa Brindisi (Dec 22, 2019)
Three Pointers	(Spain) Sergio Rodríguez	AX Armani Exchange Milano	7	Happy Casa Brindisi (Oct 13, 2019)
Three Pointers	(United States) James Blackmon Jr.	Dolomiti Energia Trento	7	Openjobmetis Varese (Dec 29, 2019)
Three Pointers	(United States) Darius Johnson-Odom	Grissin Bon Reggio Emilia	7	Dolomiti Energia Trento (Jan 19, 2020)

Source: RealGM

== Awards ==
=== Round MVP ===
Round	Player	Team	PIR	Ref
1	(United States) James Blackmon Jr.	Dolomiti Energia Trento	30	
2	(United States) Josh Mayo	Openjobmetis Varese	43	
3	(Israel) Adrian Banks	Happy Casa Brindisi	42	
4	(United States) Tyler Stone	Happy Casa Brindisi	36	
5	(United States) John Brown	Happy Casa Brindisi	40	
6	(United States) Josh Mayo (2)	Openjobmetis Varese	29	
6	(United States) Reggie Upshaw	Grissin Bon Reggio Emilia	29	
7	(Canada) Dyshawn Pierre	Banco di Sardegna Sassari	29	
8	(United States) Jerome Dyson	Virtus Roma	27	
9	(United States) Julian Gamble	Segafredo Virtus Bologna	33	
10	(Israel) Adrian Banks (2)	Happy Casa Brindisi	33	
11	(United States) Kodi Justice	Allianz Pallacanestro Trieste	31	
12	(United States) Wesley Saunders	Vanoli Cremona	30	
13	(Italy) Giancarlo Ferrero	Openjobmetis Varese	35	
14	(United States) Henry Sims	Pompea Fortitudo Bologna	42	
15	(United States) Kyle Weems	Segafredo Virtus Bologna	31	
16	(United States) Dwayne Evans	Banco di Sardegna Sassari	40	
17	(United States) Jason Clark	Openjobmetis Varese	36	
18	(Canada) Dyshawn Pierre (2)	Banco di Sardegna Sassari	40	
19	(Canada) Dyshawn Pierre (3)	Banco di Sardegna Sassari	44	
20	(United States) Ethan Happ	Vanoli Cremona	34	
21	(United States) Ethan Happ (2)	Vanoli Cremona	27	

== Playoffs ==
The LBA playoffs quarterfinals and semifinals are best of five formats, while the finals series are best of seven format. The playoffs will start in May 2020, to finish in June 2020, depending on result.

== Serie A clubs in European competitions ==
Team	Competition	Progress	Ref
AX Armani Exchange Milano	EuroLeague	Regular season	
Dolomiti Energia Trento	EuroCup	Top 16	
Germani Basket Brescia	EuroCup	Top 16	
Segafredo Virtus Bologna	EuroCup	Quarterfinals	
Umana Reyer Venezia	EuroCup	Quarterfinals	
Banco di Sardegna Sassari	Champions League	Top 16	
Happy Casa Brindisi	Champions League	Regular season	

== Supercup ==
The 2019 Italian Supercup, also known as Zurich Connect Supercoppa 2019 for sponsorship reasons, was the 25th edition of the super cup tournament of the Italian basketball. The Supercup opened the 2019–20 season on 21 and 22 September 2019, and it was contested in the PalaFlorio in Bari.

Qualified for the tournament were Vanoli Cremona and New Basket Brindisi, as Italian Cup finalists, while Umana Reyer Venezia and Banco di Sardegna Sassari as LBA Playoffs finalist.

AX Armani Exchange Milano were the defending champions.

Banco di Sardegna Sassari went to win his 2nd Supercup by beating Umana Reyer Venezia 83–80 in the Finals. Curtis Jerrells was named MVP of the competition.

== Cup ==
The 52nd edition of the Italian Cup will be contested from 13 to 16 of February 2020. Adriatic Arena in Pesaro will host the Cup. First eight ranked teams at the end of the first half of the regular season will qualified for the tournament.

Vanoli Cremona are the defending champions.

Eight teams qualified for the Final Eight are Brescia, Brindisi, Cremona, Fortitudo Bologna, Milano, Sassari and Venezia, Virtus Bologna.

Umana Reyer Venezia put it hands on the Italian Cup for the first time in club history after a 73–67 victory over Happy Casa Brindisi in the final in Pesaro. Mitchell Watt tallied 17 points and 10 rebounds to lead Reyer, which started the game on a 15-2 tear and led the rest of the way. Brindisi fought back and closed the gap a number of times, but Reyer was always up to the challenge. Austin Daye scored 9 of his 13 points in the fourth quarter to help put the game on ice. Stefano Tonut also scored 13 and Michael Bramos added 12 for the victors. Adrian Banks paced Brindisi with 27 points in defeat. Austin Daye was named Panasonic MVP of the competition.
