= 2019–20 Victoria Libertas Pesaro season =

Sports event

Victoria Libertas Pesaro
2019-20 season
- President: Ario Costa
- Head coach: Giancarlo Sacco
- Arena: Adriatic Arena
- LBA: season cancelled (17th)

The 2019–20 season is Victoria Libertas Pesaro's 74th in existence and the club's 13th consecutive season in the top flight of Italian basketball.

== Overview ==
For the 2019–20 season, Pesaro appointed Federico Perego as head coach. Perego had previously worked as an assistant coach for Brose Bamberg in the German Basketball Bundesliga and had served as its head coach during the latter half of the previous season.

But the season has an horrible start with a streak of 10 consecutive losses that forces the team to replace Perego with Giancarlo Sacco. Sacco's nomination is a comeback as he started his coaching career with Pesaro in 1984 until 1987 and again as head coach in the 1998–99 season.

However, even with the new coach, Pesaro did not manage to interrupt the losing streak until the first match of the second half of the season against Fortitudo Bologna, after 16 consecutive losses.

The 2019-20 season was hit by the coronavirus pandemic that compelled the federation to suspend and later cancel the competition without assigning the title to anyone. Pesaro ended the championship in the last 17th position with only one match won.

== Kit ==
Supplier: Erreà / Sponsor: Prosciutto Carpegna DOP

Home	Away	Away

== Players ==
The team composition is the same as the last game played on February 9 before the interruption of the championship due to the coronavirus pandemic.

Before the official conclusion of the season, four players left the team. Clint Chapman first and Jaylen Barford, who moved to Virtus Roma, left in search for better opportunities, while Troy Williams and Zach Thomas were released after the pandemic to rejoin their families in the US.

=== Current roster ===
Carpegna Prosciutto Basket Pesaro roster
Players
Coaches

Pos.	No.	Nat.	Name	Ht.	Wt.	Age
SG	0	(United States)	Barford, Jaylen (*)	1.91 m (6 ft 3 in)	92 kg (203 lb)	30 – 23 January 1996
G/F	3	(Estonia)	Drell, Henri	2.04 m (6 ft 8 in)	85 kg (187 lb)	26 – 25 April 2000
PG	4	(Italy)	Mussini, Federico	1.88 m (6 ft 2 in)	82 kg (181 lb)	30 – 12 March 1996
SF	5	(United States)	Williams, Troy (*)	2.01 m (6 ft 7 in)	95 kg (209 lb)	31 – 30 December 1994
G	8	(Serbia)	Pušica, Vasilije	1.96 m (6 ft 5 in)	95 kg (209 lb)	31 – 12 September 1995
PG	9	(Italy)	Calbini, Lorenzo	1.90 m (6 ft 3 in)	74 kg (163 lb)	23 – 20 December 2002
SG	11	(Italy)	Miaschi, Federico	1.95 m (6 ft 5 in)	90 kg (198 lb)	26 – 26 April 2000
SF	12	(Cameroon)	Eboua, Paul	2.03 m (6 ft 8 in)	97 kg (214 lb)	26 – 15 February 2000
C	13	(United States)	Chapman, Clint (*)	2.08 m (6 ft 10 in)	111 kg (245 lb)	37 – 6 March 1989
F	15	(Italy)	Alessandrini, Nicolas	2.00 m (6 ft 7 in)	98 kg (216 lb)	25 – 8 May 2001
F/C	20	(Italy)	Basso, Beniamino	2.05 m (6 ft 9 in)	101 kg (223 lb)	25 – 24 February 2001
PF	23	(United States)	Thomas, Zach (C *)	2.01 m (6 ft 7 in)	103 kg (227 lb)	30 – 21 June 1996
C	35	(Italy)	Totè, Leonardo	2.10 m (6 ft 11 in)	110 kg (243 lb)	29 – 8 July 1997
PF	41	(Italy)	Zanotti, Simone	2.08 m (6 ft 10 in)	91 kg (201 lb)	33 – 31 December 1992

Head coach

- (Italy) Giancarlo Sacco

Assistant coach(es)

- (Italy) Paolo Calbini
- (Italy) Luca Pentucci

Legend

- (C) Team captain
- (*) Left the team after the last match
- Injured

- Roster
Updated: March 10, 2020

Note: Flags indicate national team eligibility at FIBA-sanctioned events. Players may hold other non-FIBA nationalities not displayed.

=== Depth chart ===
Pos.	Starting 5	Bench
C	Leonardo Totè	Simone Zanotti
PF	Paul Eboua	Beniamino Basso
SF	Lorenzo Calbini	Nicolas Alessandrini
SG	Federico Miaschi
PG	Vasilije Pušica	Federico Mussini

5+5 format (colours: Italian or homegrown players; foreign players; young players)

=== Squad changes ===
==== In ====
No.	Pos.	Nat.	Name	Age	Moving from		Type	Ends	Transfer fee	Date	Source
11	SG	(Italy)	Federico Miaschi	19	Trapani	(Italy)	loan contract (from Venezia)	June 2020	Free	29 June 2019	
4	PG	(Italy)	Federico Mussini	23	Reggio Emilia	(Italy)	1 year	June 2020	Free	5 July 2019	
35	SF	(Italy)	Leonardo Totè	21	Aurora Jesi	(Italy)	1 year	June 2020	Free	6 July 2019	
12	SF	(Cameroon) (Italy)	Paul Eboua	19	Roseto Sharks	(Italy)	1 year	June 2020	Free	9 July 2019	
0	PG	(United States)	Jaylen Barford	23	Greensboro Swarm	(United States)	1 year	June 2020	Free	12 July 2019	
23	PF	(United States)	Zach Thomas	23	Okapi Aalstar	(Belgium)	2 years	June 2021	Free	17 July 2019	
3	G/F	(Estonia)	Henri Drell	19	Baunach Young Pikes	(Germany)	3 years	June 2022	Free	19 July 2019	
8	G	(Serbia)	Vasilije Pušica	23	Partizan Belgrade	(Serbia)	1 year	June 2020	Free	3 August 2019	
16	C	(Lithuania)	Tautvydas Lydeka	35	Derthona Basket	(Italy)	2 months	October 2019	Free	31 August 2019	
13	C	(United States)	Clint Chapman	30	Rasta Vechta	(Germany)	1 year	June 2020	Free	1 October 2019	
5	SF	(United States)	Troy Williams	24	Stockton Kings	(United States)	1 year	June 2020	Free	12 December 2019	

==== Out ====
No.	Pos.	Nat.	Name	Age	Moving to		Type	Transfer fee	Date	Source
1	SG	(United States)	James Blackmon	24	Aquila Basket Trento	(Italy)	end of contract	Free	1 July 2019	
2	PF	(United States)	Erik McCree	25	BCM Gravelines-Dunkerque	(France)	end of contract	Free	1 July 2019	
3	PG	(United States)	Dominic Artis	25	Dąbrowa Górnicza	(Poland)	end of contract	Free	1 July 2019	
7	G/F	(United States)	Lamond Murray	24	Rethymno Cretan Kings	(Greece)	end of contract	Free	1 July 2019	
9	PG	(United States)	Mark Lyons	29	Hapoel Tel Aviv	(Israel)	end of contract	Free	1 July 2019	
20	C	(Italy)	Andrea Ancellotti	31	Latina Basket	(Italy)	end of contract	Free	1 July 2019	
32	PG	(Italy)	Diego Monaldi	26	Napoli Basket	(Italy)	end of contract	Free	1 July 2019	
35	F/C	(Russia)	Aleksandr Šaškov	19	Olimpia Milano	(Italy)	return from loan	Free	1 July 2019	
44	G/F	(United States)	Dez Wells	27	San Miguel Beermen	(Philippines)	end of contract	Free	1 July 2019	
55	C	(Lithuania)	Egidijus Mockevičius	26	Fuenlabrada	(Spain)	end of contract	Free	1 July 2019	
16	C	(Lithuania)	Tautvydas Lydeka	36	Sintek–Dzūkija	(Lithuania)	end of contract	Free	1 November 2019	
13	C	(United States)	Clint Chapman	30	free agent		mutual consent	Undisclosed	17 February 2020	
0	PG	(United States)	Jaylen Barford	24	Virtus Roma	(Italy)	mutual consent	Undisclosed	19 February 2020	
5	SF	(United States)	Troy Williams	24	free agent		mutual consent	Undisclosed	9 March 2020	
23	PF	(United States)	Zach Thomas	23	free agent		mutual consent	Undisclosed	10 March 2020	

==== Confirmed ====
No.	Pos.	Nat.	Name	Age	Moving from		Type	Ends	Transfer fee	Date	Source
41	C	(Italy)	Simone Zanotti	33	San Crispino Basket P.S. Elpidio	(Italy)	1 + 1 year	June 2020	Free	11 July 2018	

==== Coach ====
Nat.	Name	Age.	Previous team		Type	Ends	Date	Replaces		Date	Type
(Italy)	Giancarlo Sacco	62	Legnano Basket Knights	(Italy)	1 year	2020	5 December 2019	(Italy)	Federico Perego	5 December 2019	sacked
(Italy)	Federico Perego	34	Brose Bamberg	(Germany)	2 years	2021	14 June 2019	(Italy)	Matteo Boniciolli	14 May 2019	resigned

==== Unsuccessful deals ====
The following deal never activated and the player's contract was withdrawn before the beginning of the season.

Signing date	Withdrawal date	Pos.	Nat.	Name	Age	Moving from		Moved to	Type
5 August 2019	22 August 2019	F/C	(United States)	DeJuan Blair	30	(United States)	Austin Spurs	1 year	free agent

== Competitions ==
=== Serie A ===
Pos	Team	Pld	W	L	PF	PA	PD
13	De' Longhi Treviso	21	8	13	1620	1664	−44
14	Virtus Roma	21	7	14	1639	1787	−148
15	OriOra Pistoia	21	7	14	1559	1735	−176
16	Allianz Pallacanestro Trieste	21	6	15	1574	1690	−116
17	Carpegna Prosciutto Basket Pesaro	20	1	19	1583	1849	−266

Updated to match(es) played on 9 February 2020. Source: LBA
