= 2019–20 Pallacanestro Varese season =

Italian basketball sports season

Pallacanestro Varese
2019-20 season
- President: Marco Vittorelli
- Head coach: Attilio Caja
- Arena: Palasport Lino Oldrini
- LBA: season cancelled (10th)

The 2019–20 season is Pallacanestro Varese's 75th in existence and the club's 11th consecutive season in the top flight of Italian basketball.

== Overview ==
The 2019-20 season was hit by the coronavirus pandemic that compelled the federation to suspend and later cancel the competition without assigning the title to anyone. Varese ended the championship in 10th position.

== Kit ==
Supplier: Macron / Sponsor: Openjobmetis

Home	Away	Away

== Players ==
The team composition is the same as the last game played on January 26 before the interruption of the championship due to the coronavirus pandemic.

L. J. Peak left the team before the official early end of the season, he was transferred to Cluj-Napoca and replaced by Justin Carter that never played for the team.

Jason Clark left earlier as well, in order to join his family in US during the pandemic. Toney Douglas was called to replace him, but, like Carter, he didn't play any games either.

=== Current roster ===
Openjobmetis Varese roster
Players
Coaches

Pos.	No.	Nat.	Name	Ht.		Age
G/F	1	(United States)	Carter, Justin (**)	1.93 m (6 ft 4 in)	91 kg (201 lb)	39 – 21 April 1987
SG	3	(United States)	Peak, L. J. (*)	1.96 m (6 ft 5 in)	98 kg (216 lb)	30 – 2 February 1996
SG	5	(United States)	Clark, Jason (*)	1.88 m (6 ft 2 in)	82 kg (181 lb)	36 – 16 January 1990
SF	6	(Italy)	De Vita, Gianmarco	1.90 m (6 ft 3 in)	90 kg (198 lb)	29 – 4 August 1997
PG	7	(Latvia)	Jakovičs, Ingus	1.85 m (6 ft 1 in)	82 kg (181 lb)	33 – 18 April 1993
F	8	(Italy)	Natali, Nicola	2.02 m (6 ft 8 in)	95 kg (209 lb)	38 – 1 September 1988
PF	9	(Estonia)	Vene, Siim-Sander	2.03 m (6 ft 8 in)	97 kg (214 lb)	35 – 12 November 1990
C	11	(United States)	Simmons, Jeremy	2.03 m (6 ft 8 in)	104 kg (229 lb)	37 – 11 August 1989
SG	12	(Italy)	Seck, Omar	1.88 m (6 ft 2 in)	83 kg (183 lb)	25 – 25 May 2001
PG	14	(United States)	Mayo, Josh	1.81 m (5 ft 11 in)	79 kg (174 lb)	39 – 15 July 1987
PG	15	(Italy)	Tambone, Matteo	1.92 m (6 ft 4 in)	87 kg (192 lb)	32 – 14 May 1994
C	18	(Italy)	Gandini, Luca	2.06 m (6 ft 9 in)	112 kg (247 lb)	40 – 7 November 1985
F	21	(Italy)	Ferrero, Giancarlo (C)	1.98 m (6 ft 6 in)	97 kg (214 lb)	38 – 29 August 1988
PG	23	(United States)	Douglas, Toney (**)	1.88 m (6 ft 2 in)	86 kg (190 lb)	40 – 16 March 1986

Head coach

- (Italy) Attilio Caja

Assistant coach(es)

- (Italy) Vincenzo Cavazzana
- (Italy) Alberto Seravalli

Legend

- (C) Team captain
- (*) Left the team after the last match
- (**) Joined the team before the
  interruption and never played
- Injured

- Roster
Updated: March 2, 2020

Note: Flags indicate national team eligibility at FIBA-sanctioned events. Players may hold other non-FIBA nationalities not displayed.

=== Depth chart ===
Pos.	Starting 5	Bench 1	Bench 2
C	Jeremy Simmons	Luca Gandini
PF	Siim-Sander Vene	Nicola Natali
SF	Justin Carter	Gianmarco De Vita	Giancarlo Ferrero
SG	Toney Douglas	Ingus Jakovičs	Omar Seck
PG	Josh Mayo	Toney Douglas	Matteo Tambone

5+5 format (colours: Italian or homegrown players; foreign players; young players)

=== Squad changes ===
==== In ====
No.	Pos.	Nat.	Name	Age	Moving from		Type	Ends	Transfer fee	Date	Source
3	SG	(United States)	L. J. Peak	23	Pistoia	(Italy)	1 year	June 2020	Free	7 June 2019	
11	C	(United States)	Jeremy Simmons	29	Poderosa Montegranaro	(Italy)	1 + 1 year	June 2020 + 2021	Free	23 June 2019	
14	PG	(United States)	Josh Mayo	31	Bonn	(Germany)	2 years	June 2021	Free	27 June 2019	
9	PF	(Estonia)	Siim-Sander Vene	28	Gran Canaria	(Spain)	1 year	June 2020	Free	1 July 2019	
4	G/F	(Serbia)	Milenko Tepić	32	P.A.O.K.	(Greece)	1 year	June 2020	Free	21 July 2019	
5	G/F	(United States)	Jason Clark	29	Skyliners Frankfurt	(Germany)	1 year	June 2020	Free	25 July 2019	
18	C	(Italy)	Luca Gandini	33	Basket Ravenna	(Italy)	1 year	June 2020	Free	28 July 2019	
6	SF	(Italy)	Gianmarco De Vita	22	Pallacanestro Gallaratese	(Italy)	1 year	June 2020	Free	16 August 2019	
7	PG	(Latvia)	Ingus Jakovičs	26	Ventspils	(Italy)	1 year	June 2020	Free	30 August 2019	
10	C	(Italy)	Riccardo Cervi	28	Reggio Emilia	(Italy)	end of the season	June 2020	Free	27 November 2019	
1	G/F	(United States)	Justin Carter	32	Chorale Roanne	(France)	end of the season	June 2020	Free	30 January 2020	
23	PG	(United States)	Toney Douglas	33	Estudiantes	(Spain)	end of the season	June 2020	Free	2 March 2020	

==== Out ====
No.	Pos.	Nat.	Name	Age	Moving to		Type	Transfer fee	Date	Source
2	SF	(United States)	Dominique Archie	31	Champagne Châlons-Reims	(France)	end of contract	Free	1 July 2019	
4	SG	(Serbia)	Aleksa Avramović	24	Unicaja	(Spain)	end of contract	Free	1 July 2019	
5	G/F	(Italy)	Christian Gatto	22	Robur et Fides Varese	(Italy)	end of contract	Free	1 July 2019	
7	C	(Italy)	Antonio Iannuzzi	28	New Basket Brindisi	(Italy)	end of contract	Free	1 July 2019	
10	G/F	(Belgium)	Jean Salumu	28	Pistoia	(Italy)	end of contract	Free	1 July 2019	
11	SF	(Canada) (United Kingdom)	Thomas Scrubb	27	SIG Strasbourg	(France)	end of contract	Free	1 July 2019	
13	F/C	(Italy)	Damiano Verri	33	Basket Sette Laghi	(Italy)	end of contract	Free	1 July 2019	
16	C	(United States)	Tyler Cain	31	Brescia	(Italy)	end of contract	Free	1 July 2019	
26	PG	(United States)	Ronald Moore	31	Élan Béarnais	(France)	end of contract	Free	1 July 2019	
4	G/F	(Serbia)	Milenko Tepić	32	Iraklis Thessaloniki	(Greece)	mutual consent	Undisclosed	6 November 2019	
10	C	(Italy)	Riccardo Cervi	28	Pallacanestro Trieste	(Italy)	transfer	Undisclosed	14 January 2020	
3	SG	(United States)	L. J. Peak	23	Cluj-Napoca	(Romania)	transfer	Undisclosed	29 January 2020	
5	G/F	(United States)	Jason Clark	30	Free agent		mutual consent	Undisclosed	2 March 2020	

==== Confirmed ====
No.	Pos.	Nat.	Name	Age	Moving from		Type	Ends	Transfer fee	Date	Source
21	F	(Italy)	Giancarlo Ferrero	31	Pallacanestro Trapani	(Italy)	4 + 2 + 1 years	2021 + 2022	Free	4 July 2015	
15	PG	(Italy)	Matteo Tambone	25	Basket Ravenna	(Italy)	2 + 2 years	June 2020	Free	20 June 2017	
8	F	(Italy)	Nicola Natali	31	Junior Casale Monferrato	(Italy)	2 + 1 years	June 2020	Free	21 June 2017	

==== Coach ====
Nat.	Name	Age.	Previous team		Type	Ends	Date	Source
(Italy)	Attilio Caja	58	Virtus Roma	(Italy)	1 + 2 + 3	2022	23 December 2016	

== Competitions ==
=== Serie A ===
Pos	Team	Pld	W	L	PF	PA	PD	Qualification or relegation
8	Pompea Fortitudo Bologna	21	11	10	1624	1670	−46	Qualification for Champions League
9	Dolomiti Energia Trento	21	11	10	1635	1665	−30	Qualification for EuroCup
10	Openjobmetis Varese	19	9	10	1570	1522	+48	
11	S.Bernardo-Cinelandia Cantù	20	9	11	1533	1580	−47	
12	Grissin Bon Reggio Emilia	21	9	12	1741	1763	−22	Qualification for FIBA Europe Cup

Updated to match(es) played on 9 February 2020. Source: LBA
