= Cihan Amasyalı =

Turkish basketball player (born 1983)

Torku Konyaspor
- Position: Point guard / shooting guard
- League: Turkish Basketball League

Personal information
- Born: May 19, 1983 (age 43) Istanbul, Turkey
- Listed height: 6 ft 3 in (1.91 m)
- Listed weight: 190 lb (86 kg)

Career information
- Playing career: 2001–present

Career history
- 2001–2002: Ülkerspor
- 2002–2003: İstanbulspor
- 2003–2004: Marmara Koleji
- 2004–2006: Tekelspor
- 2006–2007: Bahçeşehir Üniversitesi
- 2007: Bandırma Kırmızı
- 2007–2008: Erdemir
- 2008–2009: TTNet Beykoz
- 2009–2010: Vestel
- 2010–2011: Kepez Belediye
- 2011–2012: TED Ankara Kolejliler
- 2012–2013: Darüşşafaka
- 2013–2014: Vestel
- 2014–2015: Torku Konyaspor
- 2015–present: Mondi Melikşah Üniversitesi

Cihan Amasyalı (born May 19, 1983) is a Turkish professional basketball player who plays as a shooting guard for Mondi Melikşah Üniversitesi of the Turkish Basketball 1. League.
