= 2019–20 Pistoia Basket season =

Pistoia Basket 2000
2019-20 season
- President: Roberto Maltinti
- Head coach: Michele Carrea
- Arena: PalaCarrara
- LBA: season cancelled (15th)

The 2019–20 season is Pistoia Basket's 20th in existence and the club's 8th consecutive season in the top flight of Italian basketball.

== Overview ==
The 2019-20 season was hit by the coronavirus pandemic that compelled the federation to suspend and later cancel the competition without assigning the title to anyone. Pistoia ended the championship in 15th position.

The management did not renew the participation to the Serie A for the season 2020-21 and the team was demoted to the Serie A2.

== Kit ==
Supplier: Erreà / Sponsor: Oriora

| Home | Away |

== Players ==
=== Current roster ===
Oriora Pistoia roster
Players
Coaches

| Pos. | No. | Nat. | Name | Ht. | Wt. | Age |
|---|---|---|---|---|---|---|
| PG | 2 | (Italy) | Della Rosa, Gianluca (C) | 1.80 m (5 ft 11 in) | 73 kg (161 lb) | 30 – 20 August 1996 |
| G | 3 | (United States) | Culpepper, Randy | 1.82 m (6 ft 0 in) | 79 kg (174 lb) | 37 – 16 May 1989 |
| G/F | 5 | (United States) | Petteway, Terran | 1.98 m (6 ft 6 in) | 95 kg (209 lb) | 33 – 8 October 1992 |
| PG | 10 | (Italy) | D'Ercole, Lorenzo | 1.93 m (6 ft 4 in) | 88 kg (194 lb) | 38 – 11 February 1988 |
| C | 12 | (Australia) | Brandt, Angus | 2.08 m (6 ft 10 in) | 110 kg (243 lb) | 36 – 26 October 1989 |
| SG | 13 | (Belgium) | Salumu, Jean | 1.93 m (6 ft 4 in) | 87 kg (192 lb) | 36 – 26 July 1990 |
| PF | 15 | (Italy) | Landi, Aristide | 2.03 m (6 ft 8 in) | 107 kg (236 lb) | 32 – 1 January 1994 |
| C | 16 | (Italy) | Del Chiaro, Angelo | 2.08 m (6 ft 10 in) | 104 kg (229 lb) | 25 – 2 March 2001 |
| PF | 23 | (United States) | Johnson, Justin | 2.01 m (6 ft 7 in) | 111 kg (245 lb) | 30 – 23 May 1996 |
| SF | 24 | (United Kingdom) | Wheatle, Carl | 2.00 m (6 ft 7 in) | 88 kg (194 lb) | 28 – 14 March 1998 |

Head coach

- (Italy) Michele Carrea

Assistant coach(es)

- (Italy) Fabio Bongi
- (Italy) Luca Angella

Legend

- (C) Team captain
- Injured

- Roster
Updated: February 28, 2020

Note: Flags indicate national team eligibility at FIBA-sanctioned events. Players may hold other non-FIBA nationalities not displayed.

=== Depth chart ===
| Pos. | Starting 5 | Bench |
|---|---|---|
| C | Angus Brandt | Angelo Del Chiaro |
| PF | Justin Johnson | Aristide Landi |
| SF | Terran Petteway | Carl Wheatle |
| SG | Jean Salumu | Gianluca Della Rosa |
| PG | Randy Culpepper | Lorenzo D'Ercole |

5+5 format (colours: Italian or homegrown players; foreign players; young players)

=== Squad changes ===
==== In ====
| No. | Pos. | Nat. | Name | Age | Moving from | | Type | Ends | Transfer fee | Date | Source |
|---|---|---|---|---|---|---|---|---|---|---|---|
| 24 | SF | (United Kingdom) (Italy) | Carl Wheatle | 21 | Pallacanestro Biella | (Italy) | 2 years | June 2021 | Free | 19 June 2019 | |
| 15 | PF | (Italy) | Aristide Landi | 25 | Virtus Roma | (Italy) | 2 years | June 2021 | Free | 24 June 2019 | |
| 23 | PF | (United States) | Justin Johnson | 23 | Dinamo Cagliari | (Italy) | 1 year | June 2020 | Free | 12 July 2019 | |
| 10 | PG | (Italy) | Lorenzo D'Ercole | 31 | Scandone Avellino | (Italy) | 1 year | June 2020 | Free | 15 July 2019 | |
| 11 | C | (Italy) | Andrea Quarisa | 27 | Scaligera Verona | (Italy) | 2 years | June 2021 | Free | 18 July 2019 | |
| 12 | C | (Australia) | Angus Brandt | 29 | Hawke's Bay Hawks | (New Zealand) | 1 year | June 2020 | Free | 20 July 2019 | |
| 22 | PG | (United States) | Zabian Dowdell | 34 | Champagne Châlons-Reims | (France) | 1 year | June 2020 | Free | 25 July 2019 | |
| 5 | G/F | (United States) | Terran Petteway | 26 | Dinamo Sassari | (Italy) | 1 year | June 2020 | Free | 28 July 2019 | |
| 13 | SG | (Belgium) | Jean Salumu | 29 | Pallacanestro Varese | (Italy) | 1 year | June 2020 | Free | 16 August 2019 | |
| 3 | G | (United States) | Randy Culpepper | 30 | Prometey Kamianske | (Ukraine) | end of season | June 2020 | Undisclosed | 4 February 2020 | |
| 16 | C | (Italy) | Angelo Del Chiaro | 18 | Libertas Montale Basket | (Italy) | multi-year | | Undisclosed | 13 February 2020 | |

==== Out ====
| No. | Pos. | Nat. | Name | Age | Moving to | | Type | Transfer fee | Date | Source |
|---|---|---|---|---|---|---|---|---|---|---|
| 0 | PG | (Italy) | Riccardo Bolpin | 21 | Latina Basket | (Italy) | return from loan to Venezia | Free | 1 July 2019 | |
| 00 | PG | (United States) | Tony Mitchell | 29 | Trotamundos de Carabobo | (Venezuela) | end of contract | Free | 1 July 2019 | |
| 4 | SG | (United States) | L. J. Peak | 23 | Pallacanestro Varese | (Italy) | end of contract | Free | 1 July 2019 | |
| 5 | F/C | (The Gambia) | Ousman Krubally | 31 | ESSM Le Portel | (France) | end of contract | Free | 1 July 2019 | |
| 9 | PF | (Czech Republic) | Patrik Auda | 29 | Boulazac Basket Dordogne | (France) | end of contract | Free | 1 July 2019 | |
| 11 | F/C | (Italy) | Marco Di Pizzo | 20 | Latina Basket | (Italy) | end of contract | Free | 1 July 2019 | |
| 16 | C | (Italy) | Andrea Crosariol | 34 | Retired | | end of contract | Free | 1 July 2019 | |
| 21 | G/F | (Slovenia) | Blaž Mesiček | 22 | Mega Bemax | (Serbia) | end of contract | Free | 1 July 2019 | |
| 23 | G | (United States) | Jake Odum | 28 | Retired | | end of contract | Free | 1 July 2019 | |
| 11 | C | (Italy) | Andrea Quarisa | 27 | Aurora Basket Jesi | (Italy) | transfer | Undisclosed | 3 February 2020 | |
| 22 | PG | (United States) | Zabian Dowdell | 35 | Rasta Vechta | (Germany) | transfer | Undisclosed | 28 February 2020 | |

==== Confirmed ====
| No. | Pos. | Nat. | Name | Age | Moving from | Type | Ends | Transfer fee | Date | Source |
|---|---|---|---|---|---|---|---|---|---|---|
| 2 | PG | (Italy) | Gianluca Della Rosa | 30 | youth team | 1 + 1 + 2 years | June 2021 | Free | 7 December 2017 | |

==== Coach ====
| Nat. | Name | Age. | Previous team | | Type | Ends | Date | Replaces | | Date | Type |
|---|---|---|---|---|---|---|---|---|---|---|---|
| (Italy) | Michele Carrea | 37 | Pallacanestro Biella (assistant) | (Italy) | 2 | 2021 | 10 June 2019 | (Italy) | Paolo Moretti | 12 May 2019 | end of contract |

== Competitions ==
=== Serie A ===
| Pos | Team | Pld | W | L | PF | PA | PD |
|---|---|---|---|---|---|---|---|
| 13 | De' Longhi Treviso | 21 | 8 | 13 | 1620 | 1664 | −44 |
| 14 | Virtus Roma | 21 | 7 | 14 | 1639 | 1787 | −148 |
| 15 | OriOra Pistoia | 21 | 7 | 14 | 1559 | 1735 | −176 |
| 16 | Allianz Pallacanestro Trieste | 21 | 6 | 15 | 1574 | 1690 | −116 |
| 17 | Carpegna Prosciutto Basket Pesaro | 20 | 1 | 19 | 1583 | 1849 | −266 |

Updated to match(es) played on 9 February 2020. Source: LBA
