= 2019–20 Brescia Leonessa season =

Basket Brescia Leonessa
2019-20 season
- President: Graziella Bragaglio
- Head coach: Vincenzo Esposito
- Arena: PalaLeonessa
- LBA: season cancelled (3rd)
- EuroCup: Top 16
- Coppa Italia: Quarter finals

The 2019–20 season is Brescia Leonessa's 11th in existence and the club's 5th consecutive season in the top flight of Italian basketball.

== Overview ==
Brescia writes the club's history in Europe by achieving the Top16 of the EuroCup Basketball for the first time since its foundation. They were eliminated in the very last match against Reyer Venezia.

The 2019-20 season was hit by the coronavirus pandemic that compelled the federation to suspend and later cancel the competition without assigning the title to anyone. Brescia ended the championship in 3rd position.

== Kit ==
Supplier: Errea / Sponsor: Germani

Home	Away

== Players ==
=== Current roster ===
Germani Basket Brescia roster
Players
Coaches

Pos.	No.	Nat.	Name	Ht.	Wt.	Age
F/C	0	(Italy)	Zerini, Andrea	2.05 m (6 ft 9 in)	110 kg (243 lb)	37 – 25 October 1988
PG	2	(United States)	Trice, Travis	1.83 m (6 ft 0 in)	80 kg (176 lb)	33 – 22 January 1993
SG	4	(Italy)	Ceron, Marco (injured)	1.95 m (6 ft 5 in)	100 kg (220 lb)	34 – 16 June 1992
SF	5	(Italy)	Abass, Awudu	1.98 m (6 ft 6 in)	100 kg (220 lb)	33 – 27 January 1993
C	6	(United States)	Cain, Tyler	2.04 m (6 ft 8 in)	107 kg (236 lb)	38 – 30 June 1988
PG	7	(Italy)	Vitali, Luca	2.01 m (6 ft 7 in)	85 kg (187 lb)	40 – 9 May 1986
PG	8	(Italy)	Laquintana, Tommaso	1.88 m (6 ft 2 in)	80 kg (176 lb)	31 – 7 July 1995
SG	9	(United States)	Lansdowne, DeAndre	1.88 m (6 ft 2 in)	93 kg (205 lb)	37 – 6 June 1989
C	18	(Italy)	Guariglia, Tommaso	2.07 m (6 ft 9 in)	100 kg (220 lb)	29 – 8 August 1997
F	30	(United States)	Horton, Ken	2.01 m (6 ft 7 in)	99 kg (218 lb)	37 – 25 July 1989
SF	34	(United States)	Moss, David (C)	1.96 m (6 ft 5 in)	100 kg (220 lb)	43 – 9 September 1983
F	41	(Italy)	Sacchetti, Brian	2.00 m (6 ft 7 in)	100 kg (220 lb)	40 – 4 May 1986

Head coach

- (Italy) Vincenzo Esposito

Assistant coach(es)

- (Italy) Giacomo Baioni
- (Italy) Matteo Cotelli
- (Italy) Gianpaolo Alberti

Legend

- (C) Team captain
- Injured

- Roster
Updated: March 3, 2020

Note: Flags indicate national team eligibility at FIBA-sanctioned events. Players may hold other non-FIBA nationalities not displayed.

=== Depth chart ===
Pos.	Starting 5	Bench 1	Bench 2
C	Tyler Cain	Andrea Zerini	Tommaso Guariglia
PF	Ken Horton	Brian Sacchetti
SF	Awudu Abass	David Moss
SG	DeAndre Lansdowne	Marco Ceron
PG	Luca Vitali	Tommaso Laquintana	Travis Trice

5+5 format (colours: Italian or homegrown players; foreign players; young players)

=== Squad changes ===
==== In ====
No.	Pos.	Nat.	Name	Age	Moving from		Type	Ends	Transfer fee	Date	Source
6	C	(United States)	Tyler Cain	30	Pallacanestro Varese	(Italy)	2 years	June 2021	Free	18 June 2019	
30	F	(United States)	Ken Horton	29	Astana	(Kazakhstan)	1 year	June 2020	Free	24 June 2019	
9	SG	(United States)	DeAndre Lansdowne	30	Braunschweig	(Germany)	1 years	June 2020	Free	27 June 2019	
18	C	(Italy)	Tommaso Guariglia	21	Fortitudo Agrigento	(Italy)	2 + 1 + 1 years	June 2021	Free	15 July 2019	
1	G	(United States)	Angelo Warner	27	Soproni KC	(Hungary)	1 year	June 2020	Free	30 September 2019	
15	F	(Latvia)	Ojārs Siliņš	26	Scandone Avellino	(Italy)	2 months	January 2020	Free	4 December 2019	
2	PG	(United States)	Travis Trice	26	SIG Strasbourg	(France)	end of season	June 2020	Undisclosed	15 January 2020	

==== Out ====
No.	Pos.	Nat.	Name	Age	Moving to		Type	Transfer fee	Date	Source
1	SG	(United States)	Jordan Hamilton	28	Metros de Santiago	(Dominican Republic)	end of contract	Free	1 July 2019	
9	SG	(United States)	Jared Cunningham	28	Santa Cruz Warriors	(United States)	end of contract	Free	1 July 2019	
10	G/F	(Italy)	Matteo Caroli	28	Pallacanestro Senigallia	(Italy)	end of contract	Free	1 July 2019	
18	C	(United States)	Gerald Beverly	25	Amatori Udine	(Italy)	end of contract	Free	1 July 2019	
15	F	(Latvia)	Ojārs Siliņš	26	Gravelines-Dunkerque	(France)	mutual consent	Free	29 January 2020	
1	G	(United States)	Angelo Warner	28	Scafati Basket	(Italy)	transfer	Undisclosed	18 February 2020	

==== Confirmed ====
No.	Pos.	Nat.	Name	Age	Moving from		Type	Ends	Transfer fee	Date	Source
34	SF	(United States)	David Moss	36	Olimpia Milano	(Italy)	1 + 1 + 2 year	June 2020	Free	21 March 2016	
7	PG	(Italy)	Luca Vitali	33	Vanoli Cremona	(Italy)	1 + 1 + 4 years	June 2022	Free	16 July 2016	
41	PF	(Italy)	Brian Sacchetti	33	Dinamo Sassari	(Italy)	2 + 3 year	June 2021	Free	1 July 2017	
8	PG	(Italy)	Tommaso Laquintana	24	Pistoia Basket	(Italy)	1 + 1 years	June 2020	Free	21 June 2018	
0	F/C	(Italy)	Andrea Zerini	30	Scandone Avellino	(Italy)	1 + 1 years	June 2020	Free	25 June 2018	
4	SG	(Italy)	Marco Ceron	27	V.L. Pesaro	(Italy)	2 years	June 2020	Free	11 July 2018	
5	SF	(Italy)	Awudu Abass	26	Olimpia Milano	(Italy)	2 years	June 2020	Free	19 July 2018	

==== Coach ====
Nat.	Name	Age.	Previous team		Type	Ends	Date	Replaces		Date	Type
(Italy)	Vincenzo Esposito	50	Dinamo Sassari	(Italy)	2	2021	26 May 2019	(Italy)	Andrea Diana	17 May 2019	mutual consent

==== Unsuccessful deals ====
The following deal never activated and the player's contract was withdrawn before the beginning of the season.

Signing date	Withdrawal date	Pos.	Nat.	Name	Age	Moving from		Type	Moved to	
19 July 2019	24 September 2019	G	(United States)	Bronson Koenig	24	Mornar Bar	(Montenegro)	1 year	Erie BayHawks	(United States)

== Competitions ==
=== Serie A ===
Pos	Team	Pld	W	L	PF	PA	PD	Qualification or relegation
1	Segafredo Virtus Bologna	20	18	2	1719	1500	+219	Qualification for EuroCup
2	Banco di Sardegna Sassari	20	15	5	1703	1506	+197	Qualification for Champions League
3	Germani Basket Brescia	21	14	7	1707	1554	+153	Qualification for EuroCup
4	AX Armani Exchange Milano	21	14	7	1687	1555	+132	Already qualified for EuroLeague
5	Happy Casa Brindisi	21	13	8	1776	1696	+80	Qualification for Champions League

Updated to match(es) played on 9 February 2020. Source: LBA

=== EuroCup ===
==== Regular season ====
Pos	Team	Pld	W	L	PF	PA	PD	Qualification
1	(Russia) UNICS	10	6	4	783	775	+8	Advance to Top 16
2	(Italy) Germani Brescia Leonessa	10	6	4	705	725	−20	Advance to Top 16
3	(Turkey) Darüşşafaka Tekfen	10	5	5	746	708	+38	Advance to Top 16
4	(Spain) Joventut	10	5	5	838	834	+4	Advance to Top 16
5	(France) Nanterre 92	10	4	6	792	809	−17	
6	(Slovenia) Cedevita Olimpija	10	4	6	799	812	−13	

Source: EuroCup Basketball
Rules for classification: All points scored in extra period(s) were not counted in the standings, nor for any tie-break situation.

==== Top 16 ====
Pos	Team	Pld	W	L	PF	PA	PD	Qualification
1	(Greece) Promitheas	6	4	2	440	383	+57	Advance to quarterfinals
2	(Italy) Umana Reyer Venezia	6	4	2	452	462	−10	Advance to quarterfinals
3	(Germany) EWE Baskets Oldenburg	6	2	4	474	501	−27	
4	(Italy) Germani Brescia Leonessa	6	2	4	421	441	−20	

Source: EuroCup Basketball
Rules for classification: All points scored in extra period(s) were not counted in the standings, nor for any tie-break situation.

=== Italian Cup ===
Brescia qualified to the 2020 Italian Basketball Cup having ended the first half of the season in 3rd place. They lost the first match in the quarter-finals against Pompea Fortitudo Bologna.

14 February 2020 Quarter finals	Germani Basket Brescia	73–76	Pompea Fortitudo Bologna	Pesaro
20:45	Scoring by quarter: 17–17, 17–16, 22–20, 17–23
Eurosport, Rai Sport	Pts: Lansdowne 15; Rebs: Moss, Horton 7 Asts: Vitali 4 PIR: Moss 11	Boxscore	Pts: Sims 17; Rebs: Sims 8 Asts: three players 2 PIR: Aradori 20	Arena: Adriatic Arena; Referees: Roberto Begnis, Carmelo Lo Guzzo, Denny Borgioni
