= 2019–20 Universo Treviso Basket season =

Universo Treviso Basket
2019-20 season
- President: Paolo Vazzoler
- Head coach: Massimiliano Menetti
- Arena: Palaverde
- LBA: season cancelled (13th)

The 2019–20 season is Universo Treviso Basket's 8th in existence (6th after the re-foundation) and the club's 1st season in the Lega Basket Serie A after the promotion in the top flight of Italian basketball.

== Overview ==
Treviso qualified to the Serie A after ending the 2018–19 Serie A2 Basket in second position and winning the qualification playoffs.

The 2019-20 season was hit by the coronavirus pandemic that compelled the federation to suspend and later cancel the competition without assigning the title to anyone. Treviso ended the championship in 13th position.

== Kit ==
Supplier: Erreà / Sponsor: De'Longhi

| Home | Away |

== Players ==
=== Current roster ===
De'Longhi Treviso roster
Players
Coaches

| Pos. | No. | Nat. | Name | Ht. | Wt. | Age |
|---|---|---|---|---|---|---|
| C | 0 | (Italy) | Tessitori, Amedeo | 2.08 m (6 ft 10 in) | 97 kg (214 lb) | 30 – 7 October 1994 |
| SG | 1 | (Poland) | Logan, David | 1.85 m (6 ft 1 in) | 77 kg (170 lb) | 42 – 26 December 1982 |
| PF | 4 | (Italy) | Alviti, Davide | 2.00 m (6 ft 7 in) | 88 kg (194 lb) | 28 – 5 November 1996 |
| PG | 5 | (Slovenia) | Nikolić, Aleksej | 1.91 m (6 ft 3 in) | 92 kg (203 lb) | 30 – 21 February 1995 |
| SF | 6 | (Cape Verde) | Almeida, Ivan | 1.98 m (6 ft 6 in) | 98 kg (216 lb) | 35 – 10 May 1989 |
| SF | 11 | (United States) | Parks, Jordan | 2.01 m (6 ft 7 in) | 91 kg (201 lb) | 30 – 16 April 1994 |
| PG | 12 | (Italy) | Imbrò, Matteo (C) | 1.92 m (6 ft 4 in) | 86 kg (190 lb) | 31 – 12 February 1994 |
| F/C | 15 | (Italy) | Chillo, Matteo | 2.03 m (6 ft 8 in) | 104 kg (229 lb) | 31 – 15 June 1993 |
| SG | 16 | (Italy) | Uglietti, Lorenzo | 1.92 m (6 ft 4 in) | 84 kg (185 lb) | 30 – 27 June 1994 |
| F/C | 20 | (Italy) | Severini, Luca | 2.04 m (6 ft 8 in) | 92 kg (203 lb) | 28 – 20 June 1996 |
| PF | 24 | (New Zealand) | Fotu, Isaac | 2.03 m (6 ft 8 in) | 104 kg (229 lb) | 31 – 18 December 1993 |
| PG | | (Italy) | Saladini, Manuel | 1.76 m (5 ft 9 in) | 80 kg (176 lb) | 23 – 13 January 2002 |

Head coach

- (Italy) Massimiliano Menetti

Assistant coach(es)

- (Italy) Francesco Tabellini
- (Italy) Gabriele Galigani

Legend

- (C) Team captain
- Injured

- Roster
Updated: 9 February 2020

Note: Flags indicate national team eligibility at FIBA-sanctioned events. Players may hold other non-FIBA nationalities not displayed.

=== Depth chart ===
| Pos. | Starting 5 | Bench 1 | Bench 2 |
|---|---|---|---|
| C | Amedeo Tessitori | Matteo Chillo |
| PF | Isaac Fotu | Davide Alviti | Luca Severini |
| SF | Jordan Parks | Lorenzo Uglietti |
| SG | David Logan | Ivan Almeida |
| PG | Aleksej Nikolić | Matteo Imbrò | Manuel Saladini |

5+5 format (colours: Italian or homegrown players; foreign players; young players)

=== Squad changes ===
==== In ====
| No. | Pos. | Nat. | Name | Age | Moving from | | Type | Ends | Transfer fee | Date | Source |
|---|---|---|---|---|---|---|---|---|---|---|---|
| 11 | F | (United States) | Jordan Parks | 25 | Orlandina Basket | (Italy) | 1 year | 2020 | Free | 19 July 2019 | |
| 24 | PF | (New Zealand) | Isaac Fotu | 25 | ratiopharm Ulm | (Germany) | 1 year | 2020 | Free | 22 July 2019 | |
| 5 | PG | (Slovenia) | Aleksej Nikolić | 24 | Partizan Belgrade | (Serbia) | on loan | 2020 | Free | 9 August 2019 | |
| 25 | SG | (United States) | Charles Cooke | 25 | Sioux Falls Skyforce | (United States) | 1 year | 2020 | Free | 31 August 2019 | |
| 6 | SF | (Cape Verde) (Portugal) | Ivan Almeida | 30 | Galitos Barreiro | (Portugal) | 1 year | 2020 | Free | 20 January 2020 | |

==== Out ====
| No. | Pos. | Nat. | Name | Age | Moving to | | Type | Transfer fee | Date | Source |
|---|---|---|---|---|---|---|---|---|---|---|
| 2 | SG | (United States) | Dominez Burnett | 26 | Tsmoki Minsk | (Belarus) | end of contract | Free | 1 July 2019 | |
| 3 | F/C | (Italy) | Alvise Sarto | 19 | Stings Mantovana | (Italy) | end of contract | Free | 1 July 2019 | |
| 7 | PG | (Italy) | Giovanni Tomassini | 31 | Scaligera verona | (Italy) | end of contract | Free | 1 July 2019 | |
| 10 | C | (Italy) | Simone Barbante | 19 | Pallacanestro Biella | (Italy) | end of contract | Free | 1 July 2019 | |
| 21 | SF | (Italy) | Eric Lombardi | 26 | Pallacanestro Biella | (Italy) | end of contract | Free | 1 July 2019 | |
| 25 | SG | (United States) | Charles Cooke | 25 | Atléticos de San Germán | (Puerto Rico) | mutual agreement | Undisclosed | 22 January 2020 | |

==== Confirmed ====
| No. | Pos. | Nat. | Name | Age | Moving from | | Type | Ends | Transfer fee | Date | Source |
|---|---|---|---|---|---|---|---|---|---|---|---|
| 12 | PG | (Italy) | Matteo Imbrò | 25 | Basket Ferentino | (Italy) | 2 + 2 years | 2021 | Free | 30 June 2017 | |
| 4 | PF | (Italy) | Davide Alviti | 22 | Andrea Costa Imola | (Italy) | 3 years | 2020 | Free | 11 June 2018 | |
| 0 | C | (Italy) | Amedeo Tessitori | 24 | Pallacanestro Biella | (Italy) | 2 years | 2020 | Free | 21 June 2018 | |
| 16 | SG | (Italy) | Lorenzo Uglietti | 25 | Pallacanestro Biella | (Italy) | 2 years | 2020 | Free | 6 July 2018 | |
| 15 | F/C | (Italy) | Matteo Chillo | 26 | Fortitudo Bologna | (Italy) | 2 years | 2020 | Free | 30 July 2018 | |
| 1 | SG | (Poland) (United States) | David Logan | 36 | Busan KT Sonicboom | (South Korea) | 5 months + 2 years | 2021 | Free | 9 February 2019 | |
| 20 | F/C | (Italy) | Luca Severini | 23 | Pistoia Basket | (Italy) | 2 years | 2020 | Free | 14 February 2019 | |

==== Coach ====
| Nat. | Name | Age. | Previous team | | Type | Ends | Date | Source |
|---|---|---|---|---|---|---|---|---|
| (Italy) | Massimiliano Menetti | 52 | Reggio Emilia | (Italy) | 3 | 2021 | 7 June 2018 | |

==== Unsuccessful deals ====
The following deal never activated and the player's contract was withdrawn before the beginning of the season.

| Signing date | Withdrawal date | Pos. | Nat. | Name | Age | Moving from | | Type | Moved to | |
|---|---|---|---|---|---|---|---|---|---|---|
| 30 July 2019 | 21 August 2019 | SG | (United States) | Elston Turner | 24 | Eisbären Bremerhaven | (Germany) | 1 year | Ifaistos Limnou | (Greece) |

== Competitions ==
=== Serie A ===
| Pos | Team | Pld | W | L | PF | PA | PD | Qualification or relegation |
|---|---|---|---|---|---|---|---|---|
| 11 | S.Bernardo-Cinelandia Cantù | 20 | 9 | 11 | 1533 | 1580 | −47 | |
| 12 | Grissin Bon Reggio Emilia | 21 | 9 | 12 | 1741 | 1763 | −22 | Qualification for FIBA Europe Cup |
| 13 | De' Longhi Treviso | 21 | 8 | 13 | 1620 | 1664 | −44 | |
| 14 | Virtus Roma | 21 | 7 | 14 | 1639 | 1787 | −148 | |
| 15 | OriOra Pistoia | 21 | 7 | 14 | 1559 | 1735 | −176 | |

Updated to match(es) played on 9 February 2020. Source: LBA
