= Vestelspor Manisa =

- Leagues: TB2L
- Founded: 1987
- Dissolved: 2014

Vestelspor Manisa was a professional basketball club based in Manisa, Turkey that last played in the TB2L.

== Notable players ==
Note: Flags indicate national team eligibility at FIBA-sanctioned events. Players may hold other non-FIBA nationalities not displayed.

Criteria

To appear in this section a player must have either:

- Set a club record or won an individual award while at the club
- Played at least one official international match for their national team at any time
- Played at least one official NBA match at any time.

- (United States) Justin Knox
