= Marco Santiangeli =

Italian basketball player

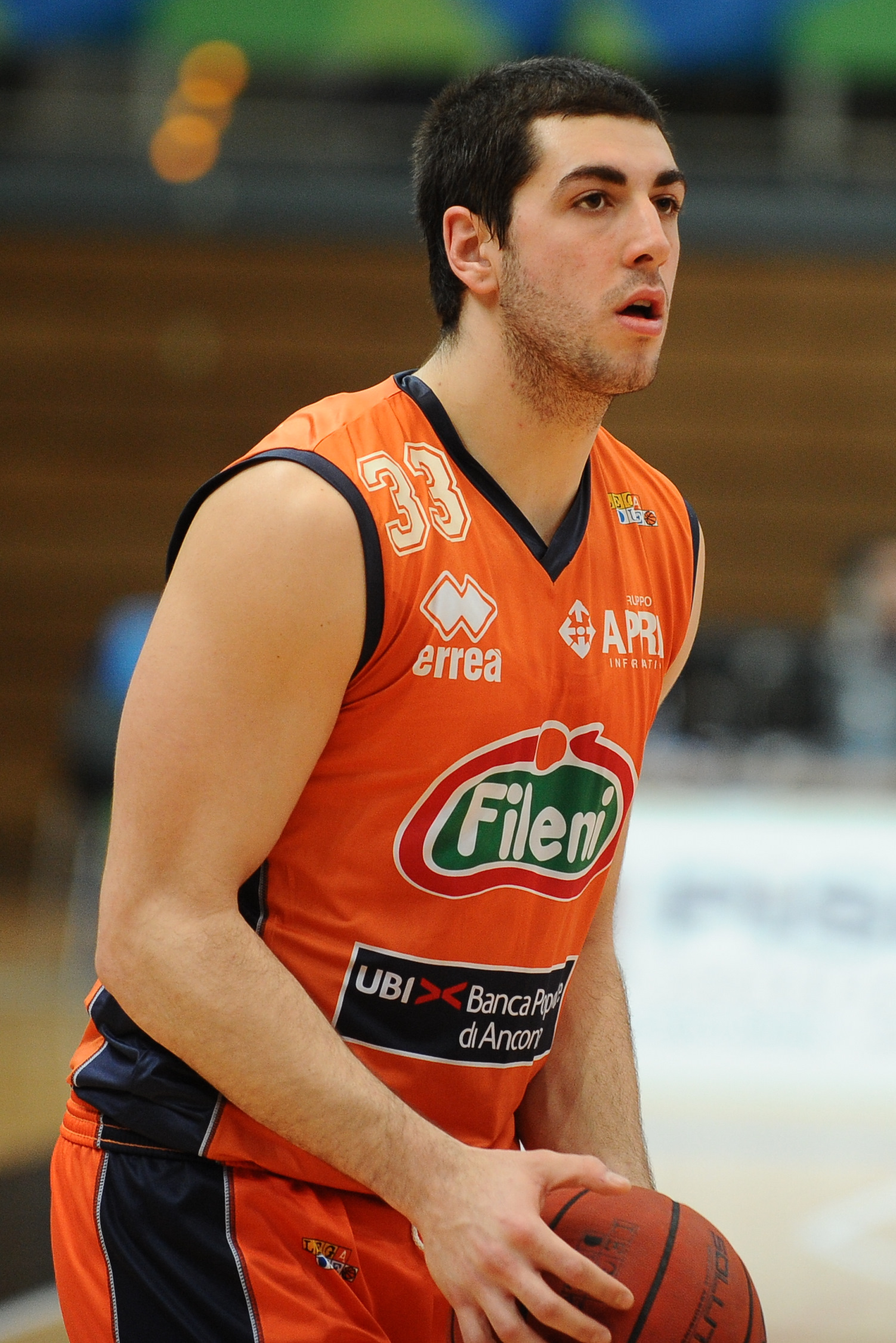
- Marco Santiangeli

Unione Cestistica Casalpusterlengo
- Position: Small forward
- League: Serie A2

Personal information
- Born: August 12, 1991 (age 35) San Severino Marche, Italy
- Listed height: 192 cm (6 ft 4 in)
- Listed weight: 95 kg (209 lb)

Career information
- NBA draft: 2013: undrafted
- Playing career: 2009–present

Career history
- 2009–2016: Aurora Basket Jesi (Italy)
- 2016–2018: Scafati Basket (Italy)
- 2018-2019: Virtus Roma
- 2019-present: U.C.C. Piacenza
Medals
Men's basketball
Representing Italy
FIBA Europe Under-20 Championship
Silver medal – second place	2011 Bilbao	National Team

Marco Santiangeli (born August 12, 1991) is an Italian professional basketball player who currently plays for U.C.C. Piacenza in the Italian Serie A2 Basket second tier national league.

== International career ==
Santiangeli won the silver medal with the U20's at the 2011 European Championship.

== Honours ==
=== Team ===
==== International ====
- European Under-20 Championship
  - 2011 Bilbao Silver
