= Justin Knox =

American basketball player (born 1989)

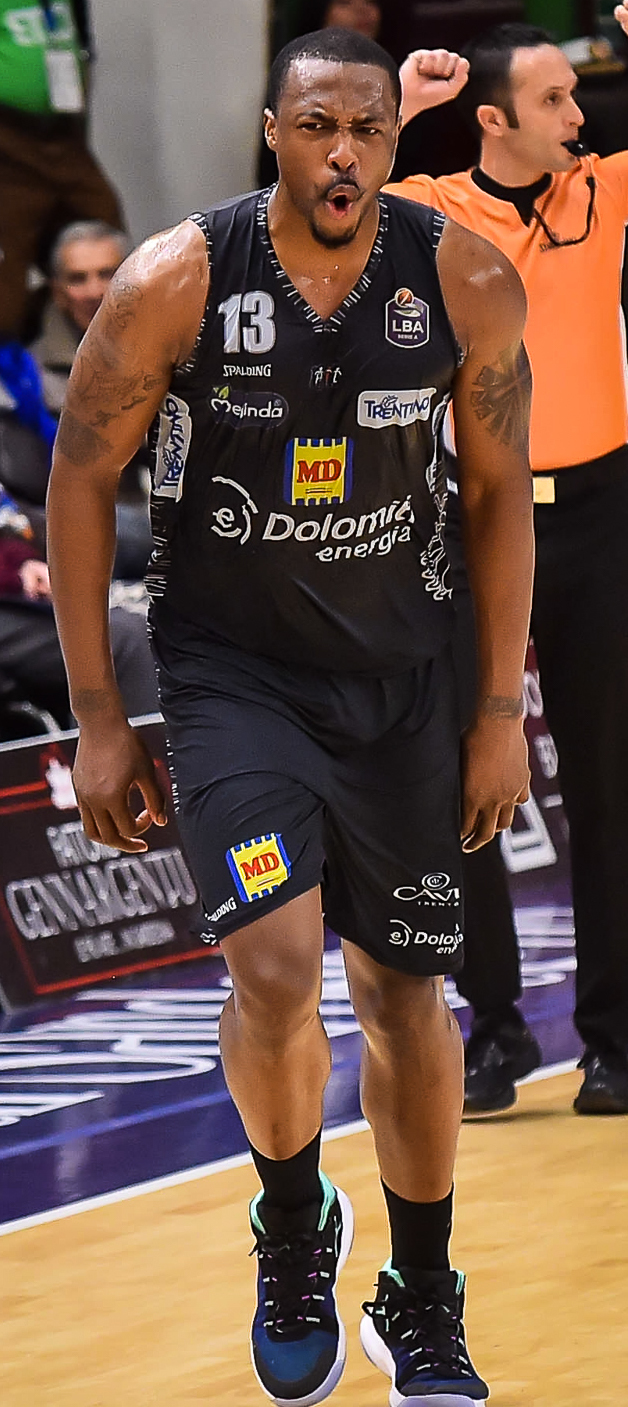
- Knox in January 2020

Personal information
- Born: January 13, 1989 (age 37) Tuscaloosa, Alabama, U.S.
- Listed height: 6 ft 9 in (2.06 m)
- Listed weight: 243 lb (110 kg)

Career information
- High school: Central (Tuscaloosa, Alabama)
- College: Alabama (2007–2010); North Carolina (2010–2011)
- NBA draft: 2011: undrafted
- Playing career: 2011–2023
- Position: Power forward

Career history
- 2011–2012: Tsmoki-Minsk
- 2012–2013: Vestelspor Manisa
- 2013–2014: Den Helder Kings
- 2014–2015: Westports Malaysia Dragons
- 2015: Capitanes de Arecibo
- 2015–2016: Final Gençlik
- 2016–2017: Fortitudo Bologna
- 2017–2018: Lukoil Academic
- 2018: Levski Sofia
- 2018: Orlandina
- 2018–2019: Pallacanestro Trieste
- 2019–2020: Aquila Basket Trento
- 2020–2021: Wonju DB Promy
- 2021–2022: San-en NeoPhoenix
- 2022–2023: Ulsan Hyundai Mobis Phoebus

Career highlights
- DBL All-Star (2014)

Justin H. Knox (born January 13, 1989) is an American professional basketball player for Ulsan Hyundai Mobis Phoebus of the Korean Basketball League (KBL). He played for the men's basketball teams at the University of Alabama and University of North Carolina. Knox, at 6 feet 9 inches (2.06 m), plays the position of power forward.

== Early life ==
Knox was born in Tuscaloosa, Alabama.

== High school career ==
Knox started all four years at Central high school. His best was his senior year, when he won the 2007 Gatorade Player of the Year award. Knox was also granted the award for the 4A High School Class Player of The Year. He finished his senior year with an average of 16 points per game, 15 rebounds, 4.2 assists, and three blocks per game. Knox also held four triple doubles, and two 20 rebound-games as a senior. Knox was then asked by the Alabama/Mississippi All-Star Game committee to play in the Alabama/Mississippi All-Star Game, which he went on to score 22 points and get 7 rebounds in. Knox was also a member of the National Honors Society (NHS) club at his school, and was a Salutatorian of Central. Knox at the tail-end of his senior year signed with the Alabama Crimson Tide Men's Basketball Team.

== College career ==
=== At University of Alabama ===
==== Freshman year ====
Knox played in 19 games his freshman year, averaging 1.7 points and 1.9 rebounds per game. But Knox, while being a newer player, was one of the higher free throw percentage shooters on the team, as he shot 80 percent (12 of 15).

==== Sophomore year ====
As a sophomore, Knox was in the starting five of the Crimson Tide, starting 31 out of 32 played games. Knox averaged 5.7 points a game, and 5.1 rebounds, while averaging more than 20 minutes per game. He scored his Southeastern Conference highs of 12 against Arkansas and Ole Miss. Knox also had back to back double digit games against Quincy University and Georgia Tech (which he also had 10 rebounds in). Knox was a consistent rebounder, rebounding at least twice or more per game except the season opening game. Knox produced an average of 5.7 points per game, with a career high of 14 against University of Tennessee at Chattanooga. Knox converted six double figure games his sophomore season, and converted a 48.3 percent field goal percentage, and was second on the Crimson Tide team in blocks with a total of 22.

===== Accolades =====
Knox finished as the winner of the SEC Men's Basketball Scholar-Athlete of the Year.

=== At North Carolina ===
Knox played his senior season at North Carolina. Since he had completed his degree and entered a masters program not offered at Alabama, he did not have to sit out his transfer year. Knox came off the bench for the Tar Heels' 2010–11 Elite Eight team, averaging 6.1 points and 2.8 rebounds in 14.4 minutes per game.

== Professional career ==
On November 17, 2013 Knox was signed by the Dutch team Den Helder Kings as the replacement for Reggie Keely. After the season in the Netherlands he signed with the Westports Malaysia Dragons of the ASEAN Basketball League. On January 16, 2015, he signed with Puerto Rican club Capitanes de Arecibo.

On August 2, 2018, Knox signed a deal with the Italian team Pallacanestro Trieste.

On July 25, 2019, he signed with Aquila Basket Trento of the Italian Lega Basket Serie A (LBA).

On June 16, 2019, he signed with Wonju DB Promy of the Korean Basketball League.

== See also ==
- Alabama Crimson Tide bio
- Knox Transferred to UNC
- North Carolina Tar Heels bio
- Justin Knox UA to UNC info
- North Carolina University scores Knox on basketball team.
- The Daily Tarheel
