= Maurizio Buscaglia =

Italian professional basketball coach

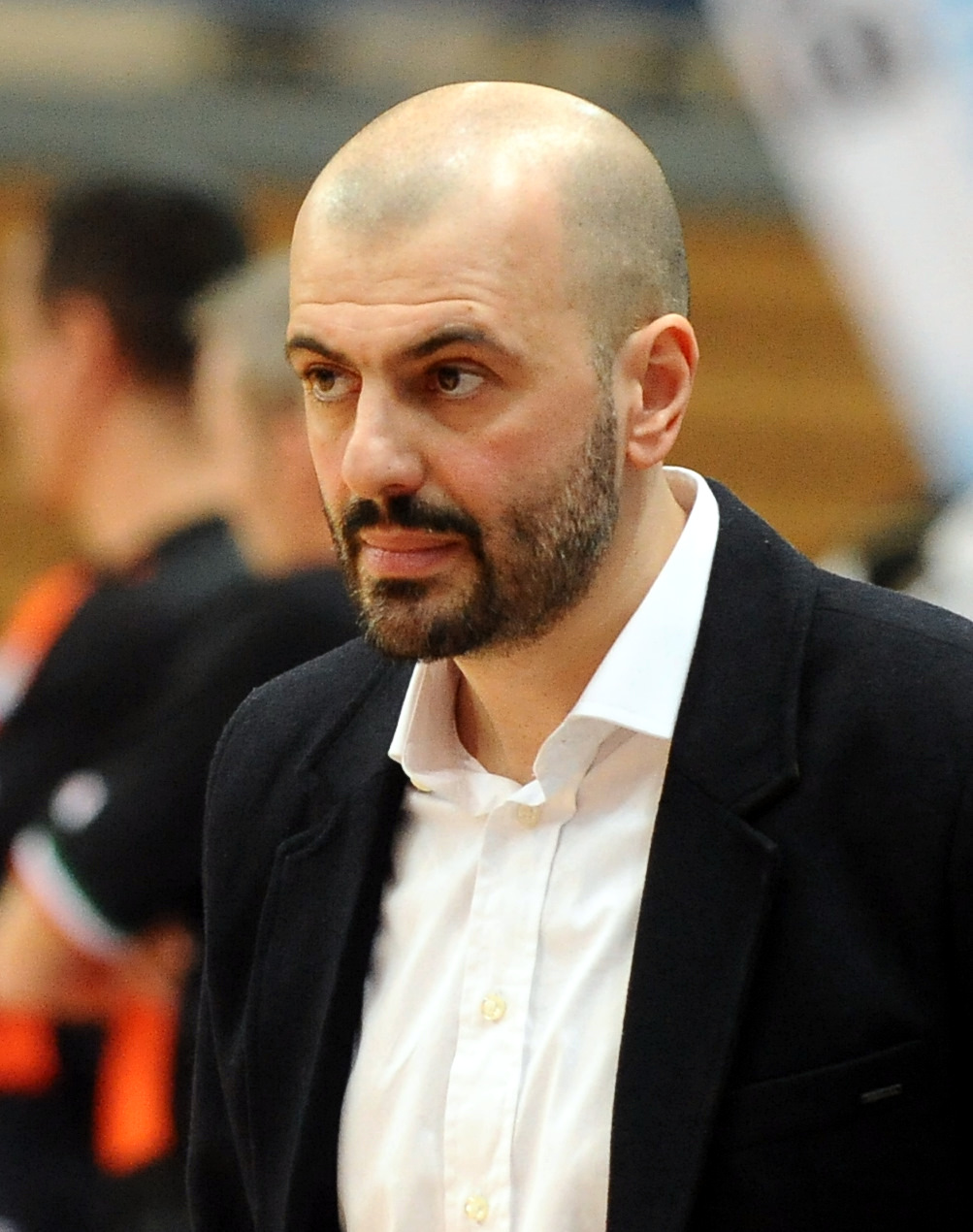
- Buscaglia in 2013

Personal information
- Born: 9 April 1969 (age 57) Bari, Italy
- Position: Head coach
- Coaching career: 1986–present

Career history

Coaching
- 1994–1995: Anzola Bologna
- 1995–1996: Salus Bologna
- 1996–2000: Piove di Sacco
- 2000–2002: Mestre (assistant)
- 2002–2003: Mestre
- 2003–2007: Aquila Trento
- 2007–2008: Mestre
- 2009–2010: Perugia
- 2010–2019: Aquila Trento
- 2019–2020: Reggio Emilia
- 2019–2022: Netherlands
- 2020–2021: Brescia
- 2021–2022: Hapoel Holon
- 2022–2023: Napoli
- 2023: Hapoel Eilat
- 2023–2024: Victoria Libertas Pesaro

Career highlights
- As coach: Italian Second Division champion (2013); LBA Best Coach (2015); EuroCup Coach of the Year (2016)

Maurizio Buscaglia (born 9 April 1969) is an Italian professional basketball coach. He was most recently the head coach of Victoria Libertas Pesaro of the Italian Lega Basket Serie A (LBA).

== Coaching career ==
After spending years coaching the youth teams of two clubs in Perugia and two more in Bologna, Buscaglia was offered the head coach role for the 1996–97 season, with Piove di Sacco. For the 2001–02 season, he began as the assistant coach of Bears Mestre in the Serie B (Italian 3rd Division), and later he was named the head coach of the team.

In 2003, he was signed by Aquila Trento, of Serie C1 (Italian 4th Division), where he stayed until 2007, and achieved a league promotion to Serie B in 2005.

He later went back to Mestre, and then Perugia Basket, achieving many league promotions.

In 2010, he again became the head coach of Aquila Trento. In the following season, he achieved the league promotion to the Serie A2 (Italian 2nd Division). In the 2013–14 season, he won the Italian LNP Cup (2nd-tier Italian Cup) and, in the same year, he achieved a league promotion to the Italian top-tier level LBA for the first time.

At the end of the 2014–15 Serie A season, his team finished the regular season in fourth place, and he was named the Italian League's Coach of the Year.

The 2015–16 EuroCup season was the first season of European-wide competition for him and his team, and at the end of the competition, he was named the EuroCup Coach of The Year.

On 22 July 2019, Buscaglia signed a contract to become the head coach of the Netherlands national basketball team, ending in the summer of 2021.

At the end of the 2019–20 season Reggio Emilia decided to replace him with Antimo Martino, but still kept Buscaglia under contract until on 1 December 2020, when Pallacanestro Brescia hired him to replace Vincenzo Esposito.

On 1 July 2021 he signed with Hapoel Holon of the Israeli Premier League.

On 16 March 2022 he signed with Napoli Basket of the Lega Basket Serie A.

After a disappointing EuroBasket 2022, in which the Netherlands went winless, Buscaglia was sacked and replaced by Radenko Varagić.

On 15 January 2023, he signed with Hapoel Eilat of the Israeli Basketball Premier League.

On 22 June 2023, he signed with Victoria Libertas Pesaro of the Italian Lega Basket Serie A (LBA).
