= Kodi Justice =

American basketball player (born 1995)

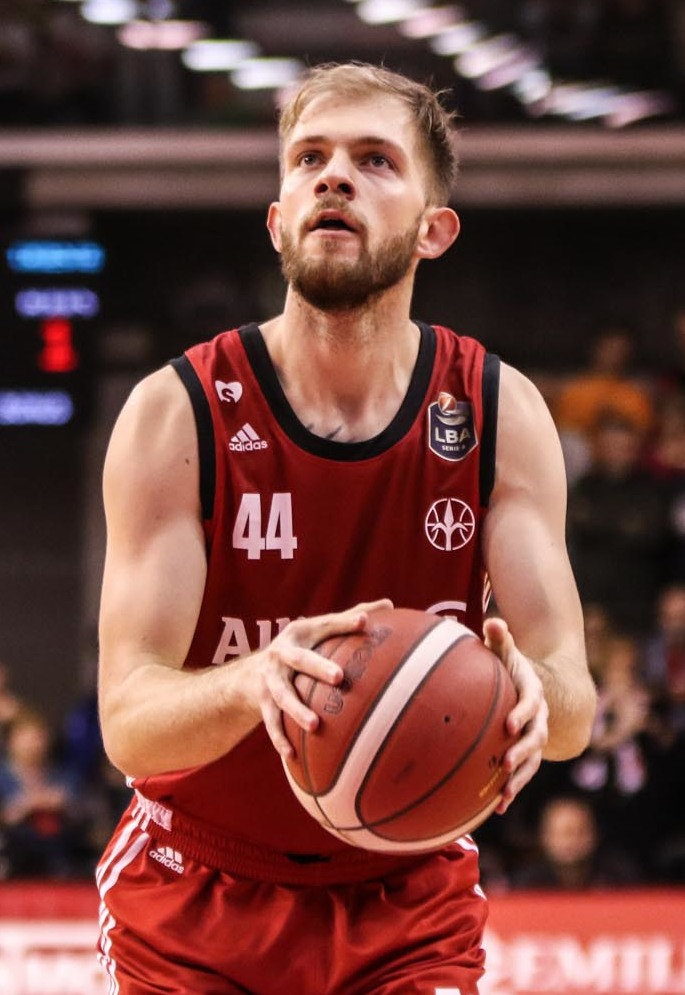
- Justice in 2019

No. 44 – CSO Voluntari
- Position: Shooting guard
- League: Liga Națională

Personal information
- Born: April 3, 1995 (age 31) Mesa, Arizona
- Listed height: 6 ft 6 in (1.98 m)
- Listed weight: 192 lb (87 kg)

Career information
- High school: Dobson (Mesa, Arizona)
- College: Arizona State (2014–2018)
- NBA draft: 2018: undrafted
- Playing career: 2018–present

Career history
- 2018–2019: Parma
- 2019: Zielona Góra
- 2019–2020: Trieste
- 2020–2021: Zadar
- 2021–2023: Śląsk Wrocław
- 2024: Monferrato Basket
- 2024–present: CSO Voluntari

Career highlights
- PLK champion (2022); Croatian League champion (2021); Croatian Cup winner (2021)

Kodi Andrew Justice (born April 3, 1995) is an American professional basketball player for CSO Voluntari of the Liga Națională. He played college basketball for the Arizona State Sun Devils.

== Early life ==
Justice began playing basketball on the Amateur Athletic Union circuit in eighth grade. He was a varsity starter at Dobson High School in Mesa, Arizona since his freshman season. As a senior, Justice averaged 15.4 points, 6.8 rebounds and 5.5 assists per game.

== College career ==
Justice played college basketball for Arizona State for four years. He missed the second half of his freshman season with a foot injury. Justice averaged 7.9 points, 2.4 assists, and 2.2 rebounds per game. As a junior, Justice averaged 9.2 points, 2.8 rebounds and 2.4 assists per game, shooting 41.7 percent from three-point range. He frequently had to play out of position at power forward due to the lack of size on the team. On November 23, 2017, Justice scored a career-high 28 points in a 92–90 win over Kansas State. He averaged 12.7 points per game as a senior and finished with over 1,000 career points.

== Professional career ==
On July 24, 2018, Justice signed with Russian club Parma of the VTB United League. In 17 appearances, he averaged 10.6 points, 2.3 assists and 1.6 rebounds per game. On March 1, Justice signed with Zielona Góra of the Polish Basketball League and the VTB United League. On August 4, he signed with Pallacanestro Trieste of the Italian Lega Basket Serie A (LBA). Justice was named most valuable player of Round 11 of the LBA after recording 24 points, six rebounds and six assists in a 69–61 victory over Universo Treviso on December 1. He averaged 9.8 points per game in 19 appearances for Trieste. On November 7, 2020, Justice signed with KK Zadar of the HT Premijer liga and the ABA League. He averaged 10.9 points, 2.4 rebounds, and 2.1 assists per game. On September 5, 2021, Justice signed with Śląsk Wrocław of the Polish Basketball League.

On March 4, 2024, he signed with CSO Voluntari of the Liga Națională.

== Personal life ==
Justice has been diagnosed with dyslexia. He did not speak publicly about his struggles with dyslexia until his junior year in college.
