= Jaylen Barford =

American basketball player (born 1996)

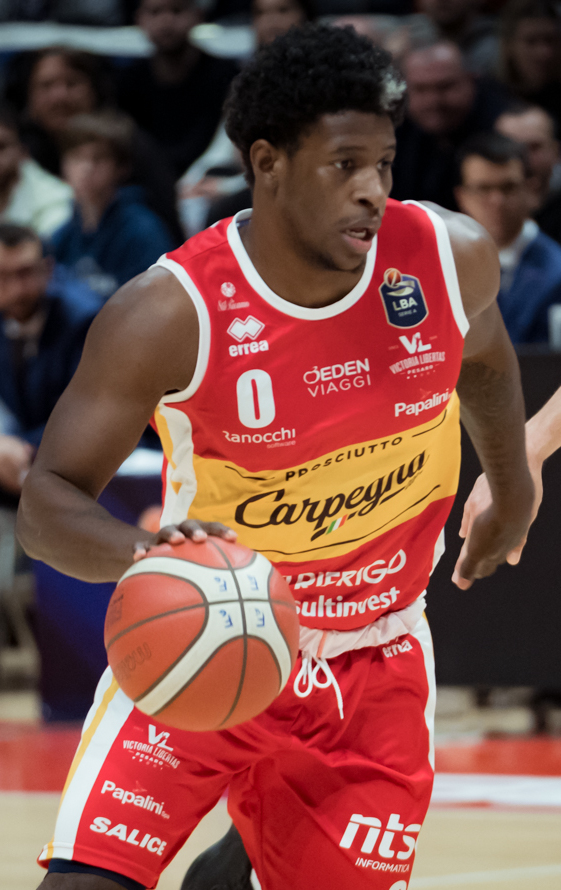
- Barford with VL Pesaro in January 2020

No. 0 – Pallacanestro Reggiana
- Position: Shooting guard
- League: LBA

Personal information
- Born: January 23, 1996 (age 30)
- Listed height: 1.91 m (6 ft 3 in)
- Listed weight: 92 kg (203 lb)

Career information
- High school: South Side (Jackson, Tennessee)
- College: Motlow State CC (2014–2016); Arkansas (2016–2018)
- NBA draft: 2018: undrafted
- Playing career: 2018–present

Career history
- 2018–2019: Greensboro Swarm
- 2019–2020: VL Pesaro
- 2020: Virtus Roma
- 2020–2021: Al Ittihad Alexandria
- 2021: Vanoli Cremona
- 2021–2022: BC Astana
- 2022–2024: Lokomotiv Kuban
- 2024–present: UnaHotels Reggio Emilia

Career highlights
- All-VTB United League First Team (2023); First-team All-SEC (2018)
- Stats at Basketball Reference

Jaylen Maurice Barford (born January 23, 1996) is an American professional basketball player for Pallacanestro Reggiana of the Italian Lega Basket Serie A (LBA). He played college basketball for the Arkansas Razorbacks.

== High school career ==
Barford attended South Side High School in Jackson, Tennessee. As a senior, he led his team to the Class AA State Championship and averaged 22.5 points, three assists and three steals per game. Barford was named the West Tennessee Player of the Year and District 14-AA Player of the Year.

== College career ==
Barford began his collegiate career at Motlow State Community College, where he averaged 20.6 points, 7.1 rebounds, 5.1 assists and 2.4 steals per game as a freshman. He was named to the All-TCCAA First Team. As a sophomore, he led all junior college players in scoring with 26.2 points per game. Barford was named to the NJCAA Division I Men's Basketball First Team All-America. He was the No. 1 junior college transfer in the 2016 class when he committed to Arkansas.

As a junior at Arkansas, Barford averaged 12.8 points, 3.8 rebounds and 2 assists per game. He considered leaving early to pursue a pro career and declared for the 2017 NBA draft, but ultimately decided to return to Arkansas. On December 30, 2017, Barford notched a career-high 28 points in an overtime win against Tennessee Volunteers in which backcourt mate Daryl Macon also had a career high in points. Barford matched his career high with 28 points in an 88–73 loss to Florida on January 17, 2018. As a senior, he averaged 17.9 points and 3.9 rebounds per game. At the conclusion of the regular season he was named to the First Team All-SEC. After the season, he was invited to the Portsmouth Invitational Tournament and won MVP after averaging 19.3 points per game.

== Professional career ==
=== Greensboro Swarm (2018–2019) ===
After going undrafted in the 2018 NBA draft, Barford joined the Minnesota Timberwolves for the 2018 NBA Summer League play. On July 26, he signed a training camp deal with the Charlotte Hornets. Barford was waived by the Hornets on October 11. He subsequently was added to the roster of the Hornets’ NBA G League affiliate, the Greensboro Swarm.

=== Italian Serie A (2019–2020) ===
On July 12, 2019, Barford signed with VL Pesaro of the LBA. Given the difficulties of Pesaro, next to the relegation, he left the team before the end of the season and moved to Virtus Roma. In his only game for the team, Barford had 13 points, 7 rebounds and 3 assists.

=== Egypt (2020–2021) ===
On October 27, 2020, Barford signed with Al Ittihad Alexandria of the Egyptian Basketball Super League.

=== Italian Serie A (2021) ===
Barford returned to Italy on February 8, 2021, signing until the end of the season for Vanoli Cremona. He averaged 15 points and 3.3 rebounds per game.

=== Kazakhstan (2021–2022) ===
On September 20, 2021, Barford signed with Astana of the Kazakhstan Championship, the VTB United League, and the FIBA Asia Champions Cup. He averaged 23 points, 4.8 rebounds, 2.1 steals and 1.6 assists per game in VTB United League play.

=== Russia (2022–2024) ===
On February 1, 2022, Barford signed with the Russian team Lokomotiv Kuban of the VTB United League.

=== Italian Serie A (2024–present) ===
On August 2, 2024, he signed with Pallacanestro Reggiana of the Italian Lega Basket Serie A (LBA).

== Career statistics ==
Legend
GP	Games played	GS	Games started	MPG	Minutes per game
FG%	Field goal percentage	3P%	3-point field goal percentage	FT%	Free throw percentage
RPG	Rebounds per game	APG	Assists per game	SPG	Steals per game
BPG	Blocks per game	PPG	Points per game	**Bold**	Career high

=== College ===
Year	Team	GP	GS	MPG	FG%	3P%	FT%	RPG	APG	SPG	BPG	PPG
2016–17	Arkansas	**36**	30	25.4	.438	.266	**.752**	3.8	2.0	**1.2**	.2	12.8
2017–18	Arkansas	35	**35**	**31.3**	**.470**	**.431**	.721	**3.9**	**2.5**	1.0	**.3**	**17.9**
Career		71	65	28.3	.455	.373	.735	3.8	2.3	1.1	.2	15.3

College statistics only available for final two years at Arkansas.
