= Riccardo Cervi =

Italian basketball player (born 1991)

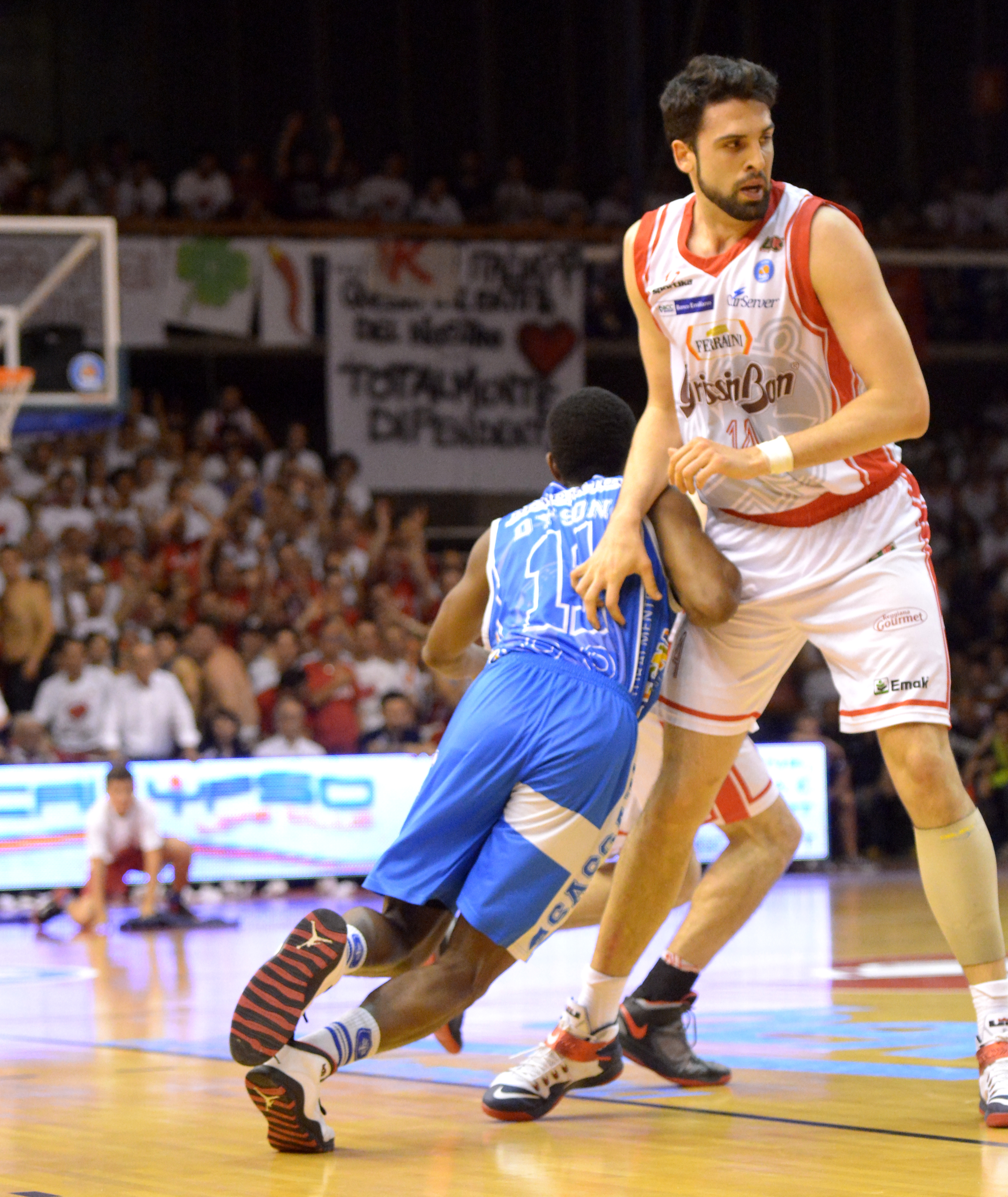

Free agent
- Position: Center

Personal information
- Born: 19 June 1991 (age 35) Reggio Emilia, Italy
- Listed height: 2.15 m (7 ft 1 in)
- Listed weight: 115 kg (254 lb)

Career information
- NBA draft: 2011: undrafted
- Playing career: 2010–present

Career history
- 2010–2015: Pallacanestro Reggiana
- 2015–2016: Sidigas Avellino
- 2016–2019: Pallacanestro Reggiana
- 2019-2020: Pallacanestro Varese
- 2020: Pallacanestro Trieste
- 2020: Virtus Roma

Career highlights
- EuroChallenge champion (2014); 2× Serie A All-Star (2012, 2013)
Medals
Men's basketball
Representing Italy
FIBA Europe Under-20 Championship
Silver medal – second place	2011 Bilbao

Riccardo Cervi (born 19 June 1991) is an Italian professional basketball player who last played for Virtus Roma of the Italian Lega Basket Serie A (LBA).

== Youth career ==
The Reggio Emilia native joined local side Pallacanestro Reggiana from Basket 2000 Scandiano in the summer of 2006, he was permanently transferred the next year.

Cervi was loaned to Stella Azzurra Roma in order to participate in the Nike International Junior Tournament, finishing with 8.3 points and 6.3 rebounds on average.

== Professional career ==
Cervi made his professional debut in the Legadue in 2010, playing two minutes without statistics in his only game that season. He signed his first professional contract, a five-year deal, with Reggio in November 2010, also being incorporated into the first squad that season.

In 2011-12 he contributed 4.5 points, 4.5 rebounds and a league best 2.2 blocks in 16.6 minutes per game, helping his side earn a promotion to the first division Serie A. For his prowess he was selected as the Legadue's best Italian player. His contract with the side was renegotiated, while the length stayed the same, his salary was increased and an annual NBA escape clause inserted.

After having major knee surgery over the summer, Cervi had a difficult start in his first Serie A season whilst also struggling to change his shooting technique. He improved in the last months of the 2012-13 season and was one of the best Reggio players in the playoff series against Acea Roma. After a slow start in 2013-14, he finished the season as a starter, contributing 9 points, 4.2 rebounds and 1.2 blocks per game in the closely fought playoff series against holders Montepaschi Siena. The same season he posted 3.8 points, 3.6 rebounds and 1.1 blocks (a tournament 4th best) in around 14 minutes per game in the European third tier 2013–14 EuroChallenge, including 7 points, 5 rebounds and 2 blocks in the final, to help Reggio Emilia win the title.

The EuroChallenge title gave Reggio Emilia the chance to play in the second tier 2014-15 Eurocup where Cervi posted 5.6 points, 4.3 rebounds and 1.2 blocks as the side exited at the group stage. He finished as the second best shot blocker of the 2014-15 Serie A with 1.8 per game.

In July 2015 he joined EA7 Emporio Armani Milano, signing a two-year deal with the EuroLeague-playing side. However, only a few days after the announcement Milan decided to exercise a clause in his contract to release the player. He then signed with another Serie A side, Sidigas Avellino on 29 July.

On 8 August 2020 Cervi signed for Virtus Roma.

After Virtus Roma's withdrawal from the Serie A due to financial problems, Cervi, like all the Roma players, was made free agent.

== International career ==
Cervi played with the Italy Under-20 squad in the 2011 European Championship, posting 4.2 points, 2.1 rebounds and 1.4 blocks as the side came home with a silver medal.

He was part of the Italy B squad that finished 5th at the 2013 Mediterranean Games.

Cervi would make his full international debut for Italy against Germany in July 2014.

At 2.16 m, Cervi is an intimidating presence in the paint, a rare characteristic for an Italian, as such he has regularly been called up to Italy squads.

He took part in the successful qualification for EuroBasket 2015, with 3.8 points, 3.5 rebounds and 2.8 blocks in 13 minutes per game. The center was called to the preliminary squad for the competition in June 2015, but he did not make the final cut.

== Honours ==
=== Individual ===
- Best Italian in Legadue: 2012
- Serie A All Star Game: participant (2013, 2014)

=== Team ===
==== Europe ====
- EuroChallenge: winner (2014)

==== Youth ====
- FIBA Europe Under-20 Championship: Spain 2011 Silver
