= Italian Basketball Federation =

Basketball association

- Founded: 1921; 105 years ago
- Affiliation: FIBA Europe
- Affiliation date: 1958; 68 years ago
- President: Gianni Petrucci

Official website
- www.fip.it

The Italian Basketball Federation (Italian: Federazione Italiana Pallacanestro; FIP) is the governing body of basketball in Italy. It is based in Rome.

It organises national competitions in Italy and the Italian basketball leagues, which operate the country's two professional leagues, Lega Basket Serie A (LBA) and Serie A2 Basket.

It is also responsible for appointing the management of the Italian national basketball team (men's) and women's. But also youth men's (under-19 and under-17), women's (under-19 and under-17), 3x3 men's and women's basketball teams.

It is a member of the International Basketball Federation (FIBA) as one of the founding member, and has one of the world's longest basketball traditions.

== Competitions ==
The FIP also organizes several competitions:

- National cups:
  - Italian LNP Cup
- Women's competitions:
  - Serie A1 (women's basketball)

== Sponsors ==
- Barilla Group (main sponsor)
- Spalding (technical sponsor)
- Citroën (top sponsor)
- Trentino (top sponsor)
- Molten Corporation
- UBI Banca
- La Gazzetta dello Sport (media partner)
- Sixtus
- Acqua Uliveto
- Bricofer
- Basketlike
- A.G. Spalding & Bros

Source: FIP.it

== See also ==
- Italian National Basketball Team
- Italian Cup
- Italian Supercup
- Italian Basketball Hall of Fame
