= 2017–18 Serie A2 Basket =

Serie A2 Basket
- Season: 2017–18
- Duration: 29 September 2017 – June 2018
- Games played: 480 (Regular season); 45–75 (Playoffs)
- Teams: 32
- TV partner(s): Sportitalia

Regular season
- Top seed: Alma Pallacanestro Trieste (East); Novipiù Casale Monferrato (West)
- Promoted: Alma Pallacanestro Trieste
- Relegated: Agribertocchi Orzinuovi; Cuore Basket Napoli; Metextra Reggio Calabria

Finals
- Champions: Alma Trieste (1st title)
- Runners-up: Novipiù Casale Monferrato
- Semifinalists: Consultinvest Bologna; De' Longhi Treviso
- Finals MVP: (Italy) Daniele Cavaliero

Statistical leaders
Points	(United States) Devin Ebanks	21.7
Rebounds	(Republic of Ireland) Mike Hall	13.1
Assists	(Italy) Matteo Fantinelli	7.0
Index Rating	(United States) B.J. Raymond	25.2
- All statistics correct as of 17 June 2018.

The 2017–18 Serie A2 season, known for sponsorship reasons as the Serie A2 Old Wild West, is the 44th season of the Italian basketball second league Serie A2 Basket. The season started on September 29, 2017, and will end in June 2018 with the last game of the promotion playoffs finals.

== Rules ==
The season is composed of 32 teams with a regional subdivision in two equal groups of sixteen, East and West. Each team plays twice each team in its subgroup, the first ranked team of each group then plays the eighth ranked team of the other group (e.g. East No. 1 against West No. 8), then the second best against the seventh, and so on, to form a promotion playoffs (for one place) of sixteen teams.

== Teams ==
=== By region ===
Number of teams	Region	Team(s)
6	Emilia-Romagna	Andrea Costa Imola Basket; Assigeco Piacenza; Bondi Ferrara; Consultinvest Bologna; OraSì Ravenna; Unieuro Forlì
5	Lombardy	Agribertocchi Orzinuovi; Bergamo Basket; Dinamica Generale Mantova; FCL Contract Legnano; Remer Treviglio
4	Lazio	Benacquista Assicurazioni Latina; Leonis Roma; NPC Rieti; Virtus Roma
3	Piedmont	Bertram Tortona; Eurotrend Biella; Novipiù Casale Monferrato
2	Campania	Cuore Napoli Basket; Givova Scafati
2	Friuli-Venezia Giulia	Alma Pallacanestro Trieste; G.S.A. Udine
2	Marche	Termoforgia Jesi; XL Extralight Montegranaro
2	Sicily	Lighthouse Trapani; Moncada Agrigento
2	Veneto	De' Longhi Treviso; Tezenis Verona
1	Abruzzo	Roseto Sharks
1	Calabria	Metextra Reggio Calabria
1	Sardinia	Pasta Cellino Cagliari
1	Tuscany	Soundreef Siena

=== Venues ===
==== East ====
Team	Home city	Arena	Capacity
Agribertocchi Orzinuovi	Orzinuovi	Centro San Filippo	2,400
Alma Trieste	Trieste	PalaTrieste	6,943
Andrea Costa Imola	Imola	PalaRuggi	2,000
Assigeco Piacenza	Piacenza	PalaBanca	4,500
Bergamo Basket	Bergamo	PalaNorda	2,250
Bondi Ferrara	Ferrara	Pala Hilton Pharma	3,504
Consultinvest Bologna	Bologna	Land Rover Arena	5,721
De' Longhi Treviso	Treviso	PalaVerde	5,134
Dinamica Mantova	Mantova	PalaBam	5,000
G.S.A. Udine	Udine	PalaCarnera	3,850
OraSì Ravenna	Ravenna	PalaDeAndré	3,500
Roseto Sharks	Roseto	PalaMaggetti	5,000
Termoforgia Jesi	Jesi	UBI BPA Sport Center	3,500
Tezenis Verona	Verona	PalaOlimpia	5,350
Unieuro Forlì	Forlì	Unieuro Arena	6,511
XL Montegranaro	Montegranaro	PalaSavelli	3,800

==== West ====
Team	Home city	Arena	Capacity
Benacquista Latina	Latina	PalaBianchini	2,500
Bertram Tortona	Tortona	PalaOltrepò	1,500
Cuore Basket Napoli	Naples	PalaBarbuto	5,500
Eurotrend Biella	Biella	BiellaForum	5,707
FCL Contract Legnano	Legnano	Knights Palace	1,650
Givova Scafati	Scafati	PalaMagnano	3,700
Leonis Roma	Rome	Palazzetto dello Sport	3,500
Lighthouse Trapani	Trapani	Palaillio	4,575
Metextra Reggio Calabria	Reggio Calabria	PalaCalafiore	8,500
Moncada Agrigento	Agrigento	PalaMoncada	3,200
Novipiù Casale M.	Casale M.	PalaFerraris	3,508
NPC Rieti	Rieti	PalaSojourner	3,550
Pasta Cellino Cagliari	Cagliari	PalaPirastu	2,266
Remer Treviglio	Treviglio	PalaFacchetti	2,880
Soundreef Siena	Siena	Palasport Mens Sana	7,050
Virtus Roma	Rome	Palazzetto dello Sport	3,500

== Regular season ==
=== East Group league table ===
Pos	Team	Pld	W	L	PF	PA	PD	Pts	Qualification or relegation
1	Alma Pallacanestro Trieste	30	22	8	2479	2230	+249	44	Qualification to Playoffs
2	Consultinvest Bologna	30	21	9	2260	2228	+32	42	Qualification to Playoffs
3	De' Longhi Treviso	30	20	10	2454	2187	+267	40	Qualification to Playoffs
4	G.S.A. Udine	30	18	12	2254	2183	+71	36	Qualification to Playoffs
5	XL Extralight Montegranaro	30	18	12	2412	2332	+80	36	Qualification to Playoffs
6	Tezenis Verona	30	18	12	2345	2302	+43	36	Qualification to Playoffs
7	Bondi Ferrara	30	17	13	2396	2342	+54	34	Qualification to Playoffs
8	Termoforgia Jesi	30	17	13	2385	2364	+21	34	Qualification to Playoffs
9	OraSì Ravenna	30	16	14	2308	2253	+55	32	
10	Andrea Costa Imola Basket	30	15	15	2284	2261	+23	30	
11	Dinamica Generale Mantova	30	14	16	2276	2347	−71	28	
12	Unieuro Forlì	30	12	18	2340	2353	−13	24	
13	Bergamo Basket	30	11	19	2298	2446	−148	22	
14	Assigeco Piacenza	30	11	19	2167	2301	−134	22	Qualification to Relegation playout
15	Roseto Sharks	30	6	24	2336	2576	−240	12	Qualification to Relegation playout
16	Agribertocchi Orzinuovi (E)	30	4	26	2322	2611	−289	8	Relegation to Serie B

Updated to match(es) played on 22 April 2018. Source: Lega Pallacanestro
(E) Eliminated

=== West Group league table ===
Pos	Team	Pld	W	L	PF	PA	PD	Pts	Qualification or relegation
1	Novipiù Casale Monferrato	30	22	8	2307	2147	+160	44	Qualification to Playoffs
2	Givova Scafati	30	20	10	2375	2247	+128	40	Qualification to Playoffs
3	FCL Contract Legnano	30	18	12	2352	2230	+122	36	Qualification to Playoffs
4	Eurotrend Biella	30	18	12	2425	2292	+133	36	Qualification to Playoffs
5	Orsi Tortona	30	17	13	2410	2393	+17	34	Qualification to Playoffs
6	Lighthouse Trapani	30	15	15	2354	2355	−1	30	Qualification to Playoffs
7	Moncada Agrigento	30	15	15	2381	2411	−30	30	Qualification to Playoffs
8	Remer Treviglio	30	15	15	2438	2490	−52	30	Qualification to Playoffs
9	Benacquista Assicurazioni Latina	30	14	16	2448	2429	+19	28	
10	NPC Rieti	30	14	16	2314	2315	−1	28	
11	Soundreef Siena	30	14	16	2406	2375	+31	28	
12	Pasta Cellino Cagliari	30	14	16	2427	2546	−119	28	
13	Leonis Roma	30	12	18	2241	2253	−12	24	
14	Virtus Roma	30	11	19	2343	2435	−92	22	Qualification to Relegation playout
15	Cuore Basket Napoli	30	3	27	2210	2582	−372	6	Qualification to Relegation playout
16	Metextra Reggio Calabria (Note: 34 points deducted to Reggio Calabria for irregularities of the surety required entry to the league.) (E)	30	18	12	2356	2287	+69	2	Relegation to Serie B

Updated to match(es) played on 22 April 2018. Source: Lega Pallacanestro
(E) Eliminated

== Coppa Italia ==
At the half of the league, the four first teams of each group in the table played the LNP Cup.

=== Bracket ===
Quarter-finals; 2 March
1E	Alma Pallacanestro Trieste	66
4W	Bertram Tortona	91
2W	Eurotrend Biella	82
3E	GSA Udine	75
1W	Novipiù Casale Monferrato	67
4E	OraSì Ravenna	75
2E	Consultinvest Bologna	81
3W	Lighthouse Trapani	71

Semifinals; 3 March
4W	Bertram Tortona	95
2W	Eurotrend Biella	79
4E	OraSì Ravenna	78
2E	Consultinvest Bologna	62

Final; 4 March
4W	Bertram Tortona	89
4E	OraSì Ravenna	57

== Playout ==
The league play-out are played between the 14th and 15th placed teams of each group in two elimination rounds. The series will be played in a best-of-three format: the first, the second and the eventual fifth game will be played at home of the team that got the better ranking at the end of the regular season, the third and the eventual fourth will be played at home the lower ranked team.

Semifinals
14E	Assigeco Piacenza	2
15W	Cuore Basket Napoli	0
14W	Virtus Roma	2
15E	Roseto Sharks	1

Finals
15W	Cuore Basket Napoli	0
15E	Roseto Sharks	2

== Playoffs ==
The league's playoffs are played between the first and the eighth of each group in four rounds: eightfinals, quarterfinals, semifinals and final. All series are played in a best-of-five format: the first, the second and the eventual fifth match will be played at home of the best-placed team, the second, the third and the fourth, at the end of the regular season.

First round
1E	Alma Pallacanestro Trieste	3
8W	Remer Treviglio	0
4W	Eurotrend Biella	1
5E	XL Extralight Montegranaro	3
3E	De' Longhi Treviso	3
6W	Lighthouse Trapani	1
2W	Givova Scafati	2
7E	Bondi Ferrara	3
1W	Novipiù Casale Monferrato	3
8E	Termoforgia Jesi	0
4E	G.S.A. Udine	3
5W	Orsi Tortona	1
3W	FCL Contract Legnano	0
6E	Tezenis Verona	3
2E	Consultinvest Bologna	3
7W	Moncada Agrigento	0

Quarter-finals
1E	Alma Pallacanestro Trieste	3
5E	XL Extralight Montegranaro	1
3E	De' Longhi Treviso	3
7E	Bondi Ferrara	0
1W	Novipiù Casale Monferrato	3
4E	G.S.A. Udine	1
6E	Tezenis Verona	1
2E	Consultinvest Bologna	3

Semi-finals
1E	Alma Pallacanestro Trieste	3
3E	De' Longhi Treviso	0
1W	Novipiù Casale Monferrato	3
2E	Consultinvest Bologna	1

Final
1E	Alma Pallacanestro Trieste	3
1W	Novipiù Casale Monferrato	0
