= 2019–20 Olimpia Milano season =

Olimpia Milano
2019–20 season
- Owner: Giorgio Armani
- President: Pantaleo Dell’Orco
- Head coach: Ettore Messina
- Arena: Mediolanum Forum; Allianz Cloud Arena
- LBA: season cancelled (4th)
- EuroLeague: season cancelled (12th)
- Coppa Italia: Semifinals
- PIR leader: (Spain) Rodríguez 13.4
- Scoring leader: (Spain) Rodríguez 12.9
- Rebounding leader: (United States) Tarczewski 5.9
- Assists leader: (Spain) Rodríguez 5.2
- Highest home attendance: 12064 vs Barcelona (31 October 2019)
- Lowest home attendance: 4438 vs Trieste (6 October 2019)
- Biggest win: 93–69 vs Varese (1 November 2019); 91–67 vs Treviso (12 January 2020)
- Biggest defeat: 91–70 @ Olympiacos (30 November 2019)
Serie A	Euroleague	Italian Cup

The 2019–20 season sees Olimpia Milano competing in both EuroLeague and Lega Basket Serie A. The first is the highest level of European basketball competitions, for which Milano has a license. While in the Italian Serie A, Milano needs a confirmation after having lost the previous year championship in the semifinal against Dinamo Sassari, despite being the favourite team.

For the second year in a row, Olimpia Milano is sponsored by Armani Exchange.

== Overview ==
The 2019/2020 is a season of big changes and unfortunate epilogue due to the COVID-19 pandemic.

After having lost in any competitions of the disappointing 2018-19 season, the team first replaces the president Livio Proli with Pantaleo Dell'Orco and then the head Coach Simone Pianigiani. Ettore Messina is called to manage the team for the 2019/2020 season

Messina stated during the press conference of his presentation that the season objectives are to win the Italian Serie A and to reach the EuroLeague playoffs.

The season had a great start in Euroleague with seven wins and only two losses, while in the Italian league Milano struggles to find continuity. Soon the team starts vacillating also in Euroleague where, after the successful run, they manage to lose nine games out of twelve.

Milano ends the first half of the season with a disappointing loss in the derby against Cantù, when Messina expressed his concern about the ongoing season. The management was compelled to some corrective actions by releasing Aaron White and Shelvin Mack, after their unsatisfying performances, and hire Keifer Sykes (who joined the team already in December) and Drew Crawford, the latter only for the Euroleague.

The 2020 was the year of the coronavirus pandemic outbreak that interested first Italy and then spread out all over Europe. The Lega Basket was the first organization that decided to suspend the competition to both comply to the government directives and avoid spreading the virus amongst the players. Meanwhile Real Madrid announced on 12 March that one player was positive to the virus, only six days after the match against Milan. Euroleague followed with the decision of interrupting the competition while Milan decided to voluntarily enter in quarantine.

During the pandemic period, Lombardy was the region in Italy which suffered the most from the coronavirus. The team and the players decided to devolve part of their salary to the region's health care.

On 7 April the FIP, Italian Basketball Federation, declares the end of the season without winners.

The same choice followed for the Euroleague season on 25 May and that concludes Milano's 2019-20 season.

== Timeline ==
- 2 June 2019: President Livio Proli and Milano part ways.
- 11 June 2019: Simone Pianigiani and Milano part ways.
- 11 June 2019: Ettore Messina is appointed for the role of both president and head coach.
- 19 August 2019: Milano starts the summer preparation.
- 31 August 2019: Milano starts the preseason with the match against Junior Casale.
- 22 September 2019: last match of the preseason against Maccabi Tel Aviv. Milano ends the preseason without any loss.
- 26 September 2019: the 2019-20 Lega Basket Serie A season starts and Milano debuts with a win against Universo Treviso Basket.
- 29 September 2019: Milano signs Argentinian international Luis Scola.
- 3 October 2019: the 2019-20 EuroLeague season starts and Milano debuts with a loss against Bayern Munich.
- 4 November 2019: Sergio Rodríguez is nominated EuroLeague MVP for the month of October.
- 27 December 2019: Milano hires playmaker Keifer Sykes from the Chinese Guangzhou Loong Lions team.
- 5 January 2020: Milano ends the first half of the season with the loss against Cantù, in fourth position, with 10 wins and 6 losses in the Serie A and in 7th position, with 9 wins and 8 losses in the EuroLeague. Coach Ettore Messina expresses his disappointment in the after match interview.
- 16 January: Shelvin Mack and Aaron White leave the team; they will play respectively in Iberostar Tenerife and Hapoel Jerusalem.
- 27 January: forward Drew Crawford joins the team until the end of the season. The 2018–19 LBA season MVP started the 2019-2020 season in Turkey with Gaziantep Basketbol.
- 13 February 2020: Starts the 2020 edition of the Italian Basketball Cup. Milano was eliminated in the semifinal by Reyer Venezia.
- 9 March 2020: the Serie A is suspended due to the coronavirus.
- 12 March 2020: the EuroLeague is suspended due to the coronavirus. The team enters in voluntary quarantine.
- 7 April 2020: the Serie A is cancelled.
- 8 May 2020: the trainings are gradually resumed.
- 25 May 2020: The Euroleague season is cancelled.

== Kit ==
Supplier: Armani / Sponsor: Armani Exchange

=== Lega Basket Serie A ===
Serie A Home	Serie A Away

=== EuroLeague ===
Euroleague Home	Euroleague Away light	Euroleague Away dark

=== Italian Cup ===
Due to the dramatic events connected to Kobe Bryant, Milano decided to honour him by using in the opening game of the Italian Cup a purple and yellow jersey. The second jersey with a predominant yellow colour and purple sides, was never used.

Italian Cup Home	Italian Cup Away

== Team ==
=== Players ===
AX Armani Exchange Olimpia Milano roster
Players
Coaches

Pos.	No.	Nat.	Name	Ht.	Wt.	Age
SG	00	(Italy)	Della Valle, Amedeo	1.94 m (6 ft 4 in)	90 kg (198 lb)	33 – 11 April 1993
SF	5	(Serbia)	Micov, Vladimir	2.01 m (6 ft 7 in)	101 kg (223 lb)	41 – 16 April 1985
F/C	6	(Italy)	Biligha, Paul	2.00 m (6 ft 7 in)	100 kg (220 lb)	36 – 31 May 1990
C	7	(Lithuania)	Gudaitis, Artūras	2.11 m (6 ft 11 in)	115 kg (254 lb)	33 – 19 June 1993
G/F	9	(Italy)	Moraschini, Riccardo	1.94 m (6 ft 4 in)	103 kg (227 lb)	35 – 8 January 1991
G/F	10	(Tunisia)	Roll, Michael	1.98 m (6 ft 6 in)	92 kg (203 lb)	39 – 12 April 1987
PG	13	(Spain)	Rodríguez, Sergio	1.91 m (6 ft 3 in)	84 kg (185 lb)	40 – 12 June 1986
C	15	(United States)	Tarczewski, Kaleb	2.13 m (7 ft 0 in)	111 kg (245 lb)	33 – 26 February 1993
SG	16	(Serbia)	Nedović, Nemanja	1.91 m (6 ft 3 in)	88 kg (194 lb)	35 – 16 June 1991
PG	20	(Italy)	Cinciarini, Andrea (C)	1.90 m (6 ft 3 in)	85 kg (187 lb)	40 – 21 June 1986
SF	22	(United States)	Crawford, Drew (EL)	1.96 m (6 ft 5 in)	92 kg (203 lb)	35 – 18 October 1990
F/C	23	(Italy)	Burns, Christian	2.03 m (6 ft 8 in)	108 kg (238 lb)	41 – 4 September 1985
PG	28	(United States)	Sykes, Keifer	1.80 m (5 ft 11 in)	80 kg (176 lb)	32 – 30 December 1993
F	32	(Italy)	Brooks, Jeff	2.03 m (6 ft 8 in)	94 kg (207 lb)	37 – 12 June 1989
F/C	40	(Argentina)	Scola, Luis	2.07 m (6 ft 9 in)	110 kg (243 lb)	46 – 30 April 1980

Head coach

- (Italy) Ettore Messina

Assistant coach(es)

- (United States) Tom Bialaszewski
- (Italy) Mario Fioretti
- (Italy) Marco Esposito
- (Italy) Stefano Bizzozero

Legend

- (C) Team captain
- (EL) Euroleague only
- Injured

- Roster
Updated: 25 February 2020

Note: Flags indicate national team eligibility at FIBA-sanctioned events. Players may hold other non-FIBA nationalities not displayed.

=== Depth chart ===
Pos.	Starting 5	Bench 1	Bench 2
C	Kaleb Tarczewski	Artūras Gudaitis	Paul Biligha
PF	Luis Scola	Jeff Brooks	Christian Burns
SF	Vladimir Micov	Riccardo Moraschini	Drew Crawford
SG	Michael Roll	Nemanja Nedović	Amedeo Della Valle
PG	Sergio Rodríguez	Keifer Sykes	Andrea Cinciarini

6+6 format (colours: Italian or homegrown players; foreign players; young players; injured players)

=== Squad changes ===
==== In ====
Drew Crawford was hired in January, after the injuries in the small forward role of Moraschini and Brooks. His Euroleague escape was used for the transfer. Crawford could be used, though, only in the Euroleague because there was no room left for more foreign players in the roster for the Italian championship, the last spot was taken by Keifer Sykes.

No.	Pos.	Nat.	Name	Age	Moving from		Type	Ends	Transfer fee	Date	Source
30	PF	(United States)	Aaron White	26	Žalgiris Kaunas	(Lithuania)	2 years	June 2021	Free	14 July 2019	
9	G/F	(Italy)	Riccardo Moraschini	28	New Basket Brindisi	(Italy)	3 years	June 2022	Free	16 July 2019	
6	C	(Italy)	Paul Biligha	29	Reyer Venezia	(Italy)	3 years	June 2022	Free	22 July 2019	
10	G/F	(Tunisia) (United States)	Michael Roll	32	Maccabi Tel Aviv	(Israel)	1 + 1 years	June 2021	Free	25 July 2019	
1	G	(United States)	Shelvin Mack	29	Charlotte Hornets	(United States)	2 years	June 2021	Free	25 July 2019	
13	PG	(Spain)	Sergio Rodríguez	33	CSKA Moscow	(Russia)	3 years	June 2022	Free	30 July 2019	
22	C	(Spain)	Xavi Rey	32	Benfica	(Portugal)	1 year	June 2020	Free	24 September 2019	
40	PF	(Argentina)	Luis Scola	39	Shanghai Sharks	(China)	1 year	June 2020	Free	29 September 2019	
28	PG	(United States)	Keifer Sykes	25	Guangzhou Loong Lions	(China)	end of season	June 2020	Free	27 December 2019	
22	SF	(United States)	Drew Crawford	29	Gaziantep Basketbol	(Turkey)	end of EL season	May 2020	Free	27 January 2020	

==== Out ====
No.	Pos.	Nat.	Name	Age	Moving to		Type	Transfer fee	Date	Source
13	SF	(Italy)	Simone Fontecchio	23	Reggio Emilia	(Italy)	end of contract	Free	1 July 2019	
19	PF	(Lithuania)	Mindaugas Kuzminskas	29	Olympiacos	(Greece)	end of contract	Free	1 July 2019	
55	PG	(United States)	Curtis Jerrells	32	Dinamo Sassari	(Italy)	end of contract	Free	1 July 2019	
92	C	(Slovenia) (Bosnia and Herzegovina)	Alen Omić	27	Joventut Badalona	(Spain)	end of contract	Free	1 July 2019	
2	PG	(United States)	Mike James	28	CSKA Moscow	(Russia)	mutual consent	Undisclosed	29 July 2019	
21	G/F	(United States)	James Nunnally	29	Shanghai Sharks	(China)	mutual consent	Free	12 August 2019	
22	C	(Spain)	Xavi Rey	32	Iberojet Palma	(Spain)	transfer	Free	19 October 2019	
30	PF	(United States)	Aaron White	27	Iberostar Tenerife	(Spain)	transfer	Undisclosed	15 January 2020	
1	PG	(United States)	Shelvin Mack	29	Hapoel Jerusalem	(Israel)	transfer	Undisclosed	16 January 2020	

==== Confirmed ====
No.	Pos.	Nat.	Name	Age	Moving from		Type	Ends	Transfer fee	Date	Source
20	PG	(Italy)	Andrea Cinciarini	33	Reggio Emilia	(Italy)	2 + 2 + 3 years	June 2022	Free	9 July 2015	
15	C	(United States)	Kaleb Tarczewski	27	Oklahoma City Blue	(United States)	1 + 2 years	June 2020	Free	14 March 2017	
5	SF	(Serbia)	Vladimir Micov	34	Galatasaray	(Turkey)	2 + 2 years	June 2021	Free	10 July 2017	
7	C	(Lithuania)	Artūras Gudaitis	26	Lietuvos rytas	(Lithuania)	1 + 2 years	June 2021	Free	12 September 2017	
00	SG	(Italy)	Amedeo Della Valle	26	Reggio Emilia	(Italy)	2 + 1 years	June 2021	Free	22 June 2018	
32	PF	(Italy) (United States)	Jeff Brooks	30	Unicaja Málaga	(Spain)	2 years	June 2020	Free	25 June 2018	
16	SG	(Serbia)	Nemanja Nedović	28	Unicaja Málaga	(Spain)	2 years	June 2020	Free	27 June 2018	
23	F/C	(Italy) (United States)	Christian Burns	34	Pallacanestro Cantù	(Italy)	2 years	June 2020	Free	28 June 2018	

=== Coach ===
Nat.	Name	Age.	Previous team		Type	Ends	Date	Replaces		Date	Type
(Italy)	Ettore Messina	59	San Antonio Spurs (assistant)	(United States)	3+2 years	2022 + 2024	11 June 2019	(Italy)	Simone Pianigiani	11 June 2019	mutual consent

=== Youth team ===
The following players have been called from the youth team and have made their appearance in the championship.

Youngsters
Players

Pos.	No.	Nat.	Name	Ht.	Age
PG	14	(Italy)	Citterio, Leone	1.80 m (5 ft 11 in)	22 – 10 November 2003
PG	14	(Italy)	Invernizzi, Giuseppe	1.82 m (6 ft 0 in)	23 – 23 April 2003
SG	14	(Italy)	Musumeci, Riccardo	1.87 m (6 ft 2 in)	24 – 26 April 2002
SG	19	(Italy)	Gravaghi, Francesco	1.93 m (6 ft 4 in)	23 – 28 February 2003
C	19	(Italy)	Tam, Giovanni	2.07 m (6 ft 9 in)	23 – 4 January 2003

=== Preseason players ===
The following players have joined the team for the preseason matches. Biligha, Brooks and Della Valle where playing in the Italian national team for the World Cup. In the same competition Roll was playing for the Tunisian team. Gudaitis and Nedović were out because of physical condition.

Aleksandr Šaškov is under contract with Milano and last year played on loan for V.L. Pesaro.

No.	Pos.	Nat.	Name	Moving from		Date	Moving to		Date
00	G/F	(Italy)	Francesco Gravaghi	youth team		19 August 2019	youth team		
10	SG	(Lithuania)	Deividas Dulkys	Arka Gdynia	(Poland)	19 August 2019	Manresa	(Spain)	13 September 2019
14	F/C	(Russia)	Aleksandr Šaškov	V.L. Pesaro	(Italy)	19 August 2019	CSKA-2 Moscow	(Russia)	
22	C	(Spain)	Xavi Rey	Benfica	(Portugal)	19 August 2019	Olimpia Milano (hired)	(Italy)	24 September 2019

=== Staff and management ===
In the current season the team organization introduces a new element in the Italian Basketball where the head coach covers both the role of coach and president.

Team Staff
Coaches
Ettore Messina	Head Coach
Tom Bialaszewski	Coach Assistant
Mario Fioretti	Coach Assistant
Marco Esposito	Coach Assistant
Stefano Bizzozero	Coach Assistant
Performance Team
Roberto Oggioni	Head of Performance Team
Matteo Panichi	Athletic trainer
Giustino Danesi	Athletic trainer
Luca Agnello	Athletic trainer
Federico Conti	Athletic trainer
Alessandro Colombo	Physiotherapist
Claudio Lomma	Physiotherapist
Marco Monzoni	Physiotherapist
Medical Staff
Matteo Acquati	Physician
Ezio Giani	Physician
Michele Ronchi	Physician

Management
Pantaleo Dell'Orco	President of Board of Directors
Ettore Messina	President of Basketball Operations
Christos Stavropoulos	General Manager
Team Management
Alberto Rossini	Head of team management
Filippo Leoni	Team manager
Andrea Colombo	Assistant team manager
Alessandro Barenghi	Equipment manager
Gianluca Solani	Referee officer

== Pre-season and friendlies ==
Friendly training

28 August 2019	Olimpia Milano (Italy)	111–71	(Italy) Blu Basket Treviglio	Assago (Milan)
17:00 (CET)	Scoring by quarter: 36-25, 25-19, 24-11, 26-16
	Pts: Tarczewski 17	Boxscore	Pts: Ivanov 13	Arena: Mediolanum Forum gym

Memorial Luciano Giani

31 August 2019 Semifinal	Olimpia Milano (Italy)	76–73	(Italy) Junior Casale	Castelletto sopra Ticino (Novara)
18:00 (CET)	Scoring by quarter: 15-13, 26-13, 14-25, 21-22
	Pts: Tarczewski 25	Boxscore	Pts: Roberts 22	Arena: Palaeolo

31 August 2019 Final	Olimpia Milano (Italy)	66–54	(Italy) Pallacanestro Cantù	Castelletto sopra Ticino (Novara)
20:30 (CET)	Scoring by quarter: 21-14, 16-11, 15-18, 14-11
	Pts: Rodríguez 14	Boxscore	Pts: Procida 11	Arena: Palaeolo

Trofeo Carlo Lovari

6 September 2019 Semifinal	Olimpia Milano (Italy)	78–62	(Greece) Olympiacos	Lucca
18:30 (CET)	Scoring by quarter: 14-13, 21-15, 23-19, 20-15
	Pts: Rodríguez 15	Boxscore	Pts: Rubit 14	Arena: Palatagliate

7 September 2019 Final	Olimpia Milano (Italy)	87–75	(Turkey) Anadolu Efes	Lucca
21:00 (CET)	Scoring by quarter: 22-16, 23-18, 24-15, 18-26
	Pts: Micov, Tarczewski 16	Boxscore	Pts: Pleiß 17	Arena: Palatagliate

Friendly match

9 September 2019	Pistoia Basket 2000 (Italy)	66–89	(Italy) Olimpia Milano	Pistoia
20:00 (CET)	Scoring by quarter: 22-24, 10-23, 21-25, 13-17
	Pts: Dulkys 16	Boxscore	Pts: Petteway 20	Arena: PalaCarrara

City of Cagliari international basketball tournament

14 September 2019 Semifinal	Dinamo Sassari (Italy)	60–73	(Italy) Olimpia Milano	Cagliari
20:30 (CET)	Scoring by quarter: 18-14, 13-19, 17-22, 12-18
	Pts: Pierre 13	Boxscore	Pts: Rodríguez 15	Arena: PalaPirastu

15 September 2019 Final	Olimpia Milano (Italy)	79–78	(Russia) Khimki	Cagliari
20:30 (CET)	Scoring by quarter: 17-29, 20-7, 23-22, 19-20
	Pts: Rodríguez 25	Boxscore	Pts: Timma 23	Arena: PalaPirastu

Derby of Milan

19 September 2019	Urania Milano (Italy)	49–98	(Italy) Olimpia Milano	Milan
20:30 (CET)	Scoring by quarter: 14-23, 16-28, 10-21, 9-26
	Pts: Raivio 15	Boxscore	Pts: Tarczewski 16	Arena: PalaLido

Pavlos Giannakopoulos tournament

21 September 2019 Semifinal	Fenerbahçe (Turkey)	75–79	(Italy) Olimpia Milano	Athens
16:45 (EEST)	Scoring by quarter: 21-14, 13-23, 22-17, 19-25
	Pts: Sloukas 13	Boxscore	Pts: Rodríguez 24	Arena: O.A.C.A. Olympic Indoor Hall

22 September 2019 Semifinal	Olimpia Milano (Italy)	78–69	(Israel) Maccabi Tel Aviv	Athens
(EEST)	Scoring by quarter: 22-15, 16-24, 19-20, 21-10
	Pts: Micov 18		Pts: Wilbekin 17	Arena: O.A.C.A. Olympic Indoor Hall

== Competitions ==
=== Overview ===
Competition	First match	Last match	Starting round	Final position	Record							
Competition	First match	Last match	Starting round	Final position	Pld	W	D	L	PF	PA	PD	Win %
Serie A	26 September 2019	9 February 2020	Regular season	season cancelled (4th)	21	14	0	7	1,687	1,555	+132	66.67
EuroLeague	3 October 2019	5 March 2020	Regular season	season cancelled (12th)	28	12	0	16	2,187	2,266	−79	42.86
Italian Cup	13 February 2020	15 February 2020	Quarter finals	Semifinals	2	1	0	1	149	129	+20	50.00
Total					51	27	0	24	4,023	3,950	+73	52.94

Source: Competitions

=== Serie A ===
The 2019–20 LBA season is made of 17 teams, which means that a team will skip two rounds during the season. Milano will not play in round 15 and round 32.

==== League table ====
Pos	Team	Pld	W	L	PF	PA	PD	Qualification or relegation
2	Banco di Sardegna Sassari	20	15	5	1703	1506	+197	Qualification for Champions League
3	Germani Basket Brescia	21	14	7	1707	1554	+153	Qualification for EuroCup
4	AX Armani Exchange Milano	21	14	7	1687	1555	+132	Already qualified for EuroLeague
5	Happy Casa Brindisi	21	13	8	1776	1696	+80	Qualification for Champions League
6	Vanoli Cremona	20	12	8	1627	1617	+10	

Updated to match(es) played on 9 February 2020. Source: LBA

==== Results summary ====
Overall						Home					Away				
Pld	W	L	PF	PA	PD	W	L	PF	PA	PD	W	L	PF	PA	PD
21	14	7	1687	1555	+132	8	3	929	825	+104	6	4	758	730	+28

Source: Competitive matches

==== Results by round ====
Round	1	2	3	4	5	6	7	8	9	10	11	12	13	14	15	16	17	18	19	20	21	22	23	24	25	26	27	28	29	30	31	32	33	34
Ground	A	H	H	H	A	A	H	H	A	H	H	A	A	H	-	A	H	H	A	A	A	H	H	A	A	H	A	A	H	H	A	-	H	A
Result	W	L	W	L	L	W	W	W	L	W	W	W	W	W	-	L	L	W	L	W	W	W												
Position	2	9	7	8	11	8	5	5	7	6	4	3	3	2	3	4	4	4	5	5	4	4												

First match(es) will be played on 27 September 2019. Source: Competitive matches
A = Away; H = Home; W = Win; L = Loss

==== Matches ====
26 September 2019 1	Dè Longhi Treviso Basket	53–75	AX Armani Exchange Olimpia Milano	Villorba (Treviso)
20:45 (CET)	Scoring by quarter: 19-23, 14-12, 9-21, 11-19
Rai Sport HD, Eurosport Player	Pts: Uglietti 11; Rebs: Nikolić 7 Asts: many 1 PIR: Nikolić, Uglietti 11	Boxscore	Pts: Rodríguez 21; Rebs: Tarczewski 7 Asts: Mack, White 4 PIR: Rodríguez 21	Arena: Palaverde; Attendance: 5344; Referees: Michele Rossi, Guido Giovannetti, Dario Morelli

29 September 2019 2	AX Armani Exchange Olimpia Milano	65–73	Germani Basket Brescia	Assago (Milan)
17:00 (CET)	Scoring by quarter: 10-21, 21-10, 17-23, 17-19
Eurosport Player, Eurosport 2	Pts: Roll 19; Rebs: Brooks 10; Asts: Rodríguez 6 PIR: Roll 23	Roster	Pts: Lansdowne 13; Rebs: Cain 8 Asts: Vitali 4 PIR: Cain 22	Arena: Mediolanum Forum; Attendance: 6847; Referees: Massimiliano Filippini, Mark Bartoli, Giulio Pepponi

6 October 2019 3	AX Armani Exchange Olimpia Milano	88–73	Pallacanestro Trieste	Milan
12:00 (CET)	Scoring by quarter: 23-14, 21-14, 21-20, 23-25
Eurosport Player	Pts: Roll 22; Rebs: Scola 7 Asts: Rodríguez, Scola 7 PIR: Scola 24	Boxscore	Pts: Perić, Mitchell 11; Rebs: Mitchell 12; Asts: Fernández 5 PIR: Mitchell 17	Arena: Allianz Cloud Arena; Attendance: 4438; Referees: Denis Quarta, Christian Borgo, Alessandro Nicolini

13 October 2019 4	AX Armani Exchange Olimpia Milano	89–92	Happy Casa Brindisi	Assago (Milan)
17:30 (CET)	Scoring by quarter: 24-24, 22-29, 15-21, 28-18
Eurosport Player	Pts: Rodríguez 28; Rebs: Micov 6 Asts: Rodríguez 5 PIR: Rodríguez 30	Boxscore	Pts: Stone 26; Rebs: Stone 13; Asts: Martin 5 PIR: Stone 37	Arena: Mediolanum Forum; Attendance: 6580; Referees: Saverio Lanzarini, Alessandro Percivalle, Mauro Belfiore

20 October 2019 5	Vanoli Cremona	82–78	AX Armani Exchange Olimpia Milano	Cremona
17:00 (CET)	Scoring by quarter: 16-24, 24-13, 23-17, 19-24
Eurosport Player, Eurosport 2	Pts: Saunders 19; Rebs: Sobin 10; Asts: Saunders 6 PIR: Saunders 25	Boxscore	Pts: Micov 26; Rebs: Gudaitis, Rodríguez, Tarczewski 4 Asts: Rodríguez 5 PIR: Micov 29	Arena: PalaRadi; Attendance: 3300; Referees: Beniamino Manuel Attard, Andrea Bongiorni, Marco Vita

27 October 2019 6	Virtus Roma	73–79	AX Armani Exchange Olimpia Milano	Rome
14:00 (CET)	Scoring by quarter: 29-16, 14-14, 15-32, 15-17
Eurosport Player	Pts: Micov, Tarczewski 15; Rebs: Tarczewski 8 Asts: Mack, Rodríguez, Scola 2 PIR: Tarczewski 25	Boxscore	Pts: Alibegović, Dyson, Jefferson 15; Rebs: Jefferson 9 Asts: Dyson 4 PIR: Alibegović, Jefferson 19	Arena: PalaLottomatica; Attendance: 7591; Referees: Manuel Mazzoni, Alessandro Vicino, Michele Rossi

3 November 2019 7	AX Armani Exchange Olimpia Milano	93–69	Openjobmetis Varese	Assago (Milan)
17:30 (CET)	Scoring by quarter: 27-14, 20-16, 27-15, 19-24
Eurosport Player	Pts: Moraschini 17; Rebs: Mack, Moraschini, Brooks 4 Asts: Nedović 6 PIR: Moraschini 21	Boxscore	Pts: Clark 14; Rebs: Simmons 8 Asts: Mayo 4 PIR: Clark, Simmons 16	Arena: Mediolanum Forum; Attendance: 7608; Referees: Roberto Begnis, Fabrizio Paglialunga, Alessandro Nicolini

11 November 2019 8	AX Armani Exchange Olimpia Milano	83–63	Oriora Pistoia	Assago (Milan)
20:30 (CET)	Scoring by quarter: 21-12, 21-16, 33-15, 8-20
Eurosport 2, Eurosport Player	Pts: Nedović 19; Rebs: Tarczewski 7 Asts: Mack 6 PIR: Nedović 21	Boxscore	Pts: Landi 12; Rebs: Brandt 12; Asts: Salumu 3 PIR: Brandt 15	Arena: Mediolanum Forum; Attendance: 5100; Referees: Mark Bartoli, Gabriele Bettini, Giulio Pepponi

17 November 2019 9	Pompea Fortitudo Bologna	85–80	AX Armani Exchange Olimpia Milano	Bologna
18:30 (CET)	Scoring by quarter: 22-16, 23-15, 16-20, 24-29
Eurosport Player	Pts: Sims 17; Rebs: Sims 11; Asts: Aradori 4 PIR: Sims 25	Boxscore	Pts: Nedović 23; Rebs: Tarczewski, Brooks 6 Asts: Rodríguez 4 PIR: Nedović, Brooks 20	Arena: PalaDozza; Attendance: 5570; Referees: Carmelo Paternicò, Lorenzo Baldini, Gianluca Capotorto

24 November 2019 10	AX Armani Exchange Olimpia Milano	90–78	Banco di Sardegna Sassari	Assago (Milan)
17:00 (CET)	Scoring by quarter: 23-21, 19-14, 17-27, 31-16
Eurosport 2, Eurosport Player	Pts: Scola 15; Rebs: Tarczewski 8 Asts: Rodríguez, Nedović 5 PIR: Micov 19	Boxscore	Pts: Pierre 21; Rebs: Evans 8 Asts: Bilan 3 PIR: Bilan 27	Arena: Mediolanum Forum; Attendance: 10003; Referees: Saverio Lanzarini, Massimiliano Filippini, Martino Galasso

1 December 2019 11	AX Armani Exchange Olimpia Milano	89–78	Grissin Bon Reggio Emilia	Assago (Milan)
18:30 (CET)	Scoring by quarter: 24-23, 20-15, 31-24, 14-16
Eurosport Player	Pts: Micov, Scola 14; Rebs: Tarczewski 12; Asts: Micov 8 PIR: Micov, Tarczewski 21	Boxscore	Pts: Upshaw 15; Rebs: Pardon 10; Asts: Johnson-Odom, Mekel 5 PIR: Pardon 19	Arena: Mediolanum Forum; Attendance: 6857; Referees: Carmelo Lo Guzzo, Denny Borgioni, Dario Morelli

8 December 2019 12	Carpegna Prosciutto Basket Pesaro	65–71	AX Armani Exchange Olimpia Milano	Pesaro
16:30 (CET)	Scoring by quarter: 16-17, 14-14, 16-21, 19-19
Eurosport Player	Pts: Mussini 15; Rebs: Zanotti 10; Asts: Barford 7 PIR: Barford 15	Boxscore	Pts: Rodríguez 16; Rebs: Moraschini, Brooks, Scola 6 Asts: Rodríguez 6 PIR: Moraschini 19	Arena: Vitifrigo Arena; Attendance: 4644; Referees: Michele Rossi, Alessandro Vicino, Mauro Belfiore

15 December 2019 13	Umana Reyer Venezia	70–71	AX Armani Exchange Olimpia Milano	Mestre (Venice)
17:00 (CET)	Scoring by quarter: 19-20, 22-21, 13-18, 16-12
Eurosport Player, Eurosport 2	Pts: Daye 17; Rebs: Watt 6 Asts: Stone, De Nicolao 3 PIR: Daye, Watt 16	Boxscore	Pts: Rodríguez 19; Rebs: Scola 5 Asts: Rodríguez 3 PIR: Rodríguez 20	Arena: Palasport Giuseppe Taliercio; Attendance: 3509; Referees: Carmelo Paternicò, Tolga Sahin, Giulio Pepponi

22 December 2019 14	AX Armani Exchange Olimpia Milano	81–69	Dolomiti Energia Trentino	Assago (Milan)
18:00 (CET)	Scoring by quarter: 28-21, 15-17, 19-9, 19-22
Eurosport Player	Pts: Amedeo Della Valle 11; Rebs: Brooks 7 Asts: Rodríguez 9 PIR: Rodríguez 16	Boxscore	Pts: Blackmon 16; Rebs: Kelly 7 Asts: Kelly 4 PIR: Kelly 19	Arena: Mediolanum Forum; Attendance: 8723; Referees: Beniamino Manuel Attard, Gabriele Bettini, Guido Federico Di Francesco

29 December 2019 16	Segafredo Virtus Bologna	83–70	AX Armani Exchange Olimpia Milano	Bologna
15:30 (CET)	Scoring by quarter: 24-20, 22-20, 17-16, 20-14
	Pts: Hunter 19; Rebs: Baldi Rossi, Gamble 7 Asts: Marković 12; PIR: Marković 25	Boxscore	Pts: Rodríguez 19; Rebs: Gudaitis 6 Asts: Rodríguez 5 PIR: Rodríguez 19	Arena: PalaDozza; Attendance: 7520; Referees: Michele Rossi, Carmelo Lo Guzzo, Manuel Mazzoni

5 January 2020 17	AX Armani Exchange Olimpia Milano	83–89	S.Bernardo-Cinelandia Cantù	Assago (Milan)
17:00 (CET)	Scoring by quarter: 19-22, 17-26, 26-13, 21-28
Eurosport Player, Eurosport 2	Pts: Scola 21; Rebs: Gudaitis 7 Asts: Rodríguez, Sykes, Scola 2 PIR: Micov 18	Boxscore	Pts: Clark 21; Rebs: Burnell 11; Asts: Ragland 6 PIR: Burnell 26	Arena: Mediolanum Forum; Attendance: 8931; Referees: Massimiliano Filippini, Valerio Grigioni, Giacomo Dori

12 January 2020 18	AX Armani Exchange Olimpia Milano	91–67	Dè Longhi Treviso	Milan
12:00 (CET)	Scoring by quarter: 19-22, 22-19, 20-15, 30-11
Eurosport Player, Eurosport 2	Pts: Sykes 18; Rebs: Gudaitis, Tarczewski 8 Asts: Sykes 10; PIR: Gudaitis 31	Boxscore	Pts: Logan 17; Rebs: Nikolić 6 Asts: Logan, Nikolić 3 PIR: Nikolić 15	Arena: Allianz Cloud Arena; Attendance: 4826; Referees: Manuel Mazzoni, Gianluca Sardella, Sergio Noce

19 January 2020 19	Germani Basket Brescia	78–72	AX Armani Exchange Olimpia Milano	Brescia
20:45 (CET)	Scoring by quarter: 9-15, 20-19, 27-17, 22-21
Rai Sport HD, Eurosport Player	Pts: Lansdowne 25; Rebs: Cain 9 Asts: Vitali 8 PIR: Lansdowne 29	Boxscore	Pts: Sykes 19; Rebs: Tarczewski 11; Asts: Cinciarini 4 PIR: Tarczewski 13	Arena: PalaLeonessa; Attendance: 5124; Referees: Saverio Lanzarini, Alessandro Martolini, Guido Federico Di Francesco

26 January 2020 20	Allianz Pallacanestro Trieste	85–67	AX Armani Exchange Olimpia Milano	Trieste
17:30 (CET)	Scoring by quarter: 15-23, 19-18, 12-25, 21-19
Eurosport Player	Pts: Jones 15; Rebs: Cooke 7 Asts: Cavaliero 5 PIR: Jones, Mitchell 13	Boxscore	Pts: Scola 20; Rebs: Biligha 7 Asts: Rodríguez 8 PIR: Scola 17	Arena: Allianz Dome; Attendance: 5421; Referees: Alessandro Vicino, Lorenzo Baldini, Gianluca Capotorto

1 February 2020 21	Happy Casa Brindisi	74–77	AX Armani Exchange Olimpia Milano	Brindisi
20:30 (CET)	Scoring by quarter: 16-14, 18-18, 15-24, 25-21
Eurosport Player, Eurosport 2	Pts: Stone 21; Rebs: Martin 10; Asts: Banks 5 PIR: Stone 25	Boxscore	Pts: Sykes 17; Rebs: Tarczewski 8 Asts: Rodríguez 3 PIR: Tarczewski 21	Arena: PalaPentassuglia; Attendance: 3500; Referees: Roberto Begnis, Fabrizio Paglialunga, Giulio Pepponi

9 February 2020 22	AX Armani Exchange Olimpia Milano	77–74	Vanoli Basket Cremona	Assago (Milan)
17:00 (CET)	Scoring by quarter: 23-16, 19-23, 17-22, 18-13
Eurosport Player, Eurosport 2	Pts: Micov 22; Rebs: Roll, Brooks 5 Asts: Nedović, Sykes 4 PIR: Micov 17	Boxscore	Pts: Happ 16; Rebs: Happ 9 Asts: Stojanović 5 PIR: Happ 17	Arena: Mediolanum Forum; Attendance: 7149; Referees: Carmelo Paternicò, Mark Bartoli, Marco Vita

Due to the COVID-19 pandemic in Italy the Serie A games could not be scheduled regularly. An emergency government decree was issued in the night of 7 March, which put at risk the regular prosecution of the competition A following decree established that all the competitions and players gathering had to be suspended until 3 April.

After the Italian Basketball Federation (FIP) meeting, the season came to an early end without winners, the following matches were cancelled.

1 March 2020 23	AX Armani Exchange Olimpia Milano	vs.	Virtus Roma	Assago (Milan)
18:15 (CET)
				Arena: Mediolanum Forum

8 March 2020 24	Openjobmetis Varese	vs.	AX Armani Exchange Olimpia Milano	Varese
17:00 (CET)
Eurosport Player, Eurosport 2				Arena: Palasport Lino Oldrini; Referees: Manuel Mazzoni, Carmelo Lo Guzzo, Andrea Bongiorni

10 March 2020 25	OriOra Pistoia	vs.	AX Armani Exchange Olimpia Milano	Pistoia
18:15 (CET)
				Arena: PalaCarrara

15 March 2020 26	AX Armani Exchange Olimpia Milano	vs.	Pompea Fortitudo Bologna	Assago (Milan)
18:15 (CET)
				Arena: Mediolanum Forum

22 March 2020 27	Banco di Sardegna Sassari	vs.	AX Armani Exchange Olimpia Milano	Sassari
18:15 (CET)
				Arena: Palasport Roberta Serradimigni

29 March 2020 28	Grissin Bon Reggio Emilia	vs.	AX Armani Exchange Olimpia Milano	Reggio Emilia
18:15 (CET)
				Arena: PalaBigi

5 April 2020 29	AX Armani Exchange Olimpia Milano	vs.	Carpegna Prosciutto Basket Pesaro	Assago (Milan)
18:15 (CET)
				Arena: Mediolanum Forum

11 April 2020 30	AX Armani Exchange Olimpia Milano	vs.	Umana Reyer Venezia	Assago (Milan)
18:15 (CET)
				Arena: Mediolanum Forum

13 April 2020 31	Dolomiti Energia Trentino	vs.	AX Armani Exchange Olimpia Milano	Trento
18:15 (CET)
				Arena: PalaTrento

19 April 2020 33	AX Armani Exchange Olimpia Milano	vs.	Segafredo Virtus Bologna	Assago (Milan)
18:15 (CET)
				Arena: Mediolanum Forum

26 April 2020 34	S.Bernardo-Cinelandia Cantù	vs.	AX Armani Exchange Olimpia Milano	Desio (Monza)
18:15 (CET)
				Arena: PalaDesio

=== EuroLeague ===
==== League table ====
Pos	Team	Pld	W	L	PF	PA	PD
10	(Spain) Valencia Basket	28	12	16	2252	2273	−21
11	(Greece) Olympiacos	28	12	16	2243	2282	−39
12	(Italy) A|X Armani Exchange Milan	28	12	16	2163	2236	−73
13	(Spain) Kirolbet Baskonia	28	12	16	2059	2155	−96
14	(Serbia) Crvena zvezda mts	28	11	17	2079	2108	−29

Source: EuroLeague
Rules for classification: All points scored in extra period(s) were not counted in the standings, nor for any tie-break situation.

==== Results summary ====
Overall						Home					Away				
Pld	W	L	PF	PA	PD	W	L	PF	PA	PD	W	L	PF	PA	PD
28	12	16	2187	2266	−79	9	5	1135	1111	+24	3	11	1052	1155	−103

Source: Competitive matches

==== Results by round ====
Round	1	2	3	4	5	6	7	8	9	10	11	12	13	14	15	16	17	18	19	20	21	22	23	24	25	26	27	28	29	30	31	32	33	34
Ground	A	H	A	H	A	H	H	A	H	H	A	H	A	A	H	A	H	H	A	A	A	H	H	A	H	A	H	A	H	A	A	H	A	H
Result	L	W	W	W	W	W	W	L	W	L	L	L	L	L	W	L	W	W	L	L	L	W	L	L	L	L	L	W						
Position	15	13	7	5	5	3	2	6	3	4	7	7	8	8	8	8	7	6	7	8	8	8	9	8	11	12	12	12						

First match(es) will be played on 3 October 2019. Source: Competitive matches
A = Away; H = Home; W = Win; L = Loss

==== Matches ====
3 October 2019 1	FC Bayern Munich (Germany)	78–64	(Italy) AX Armani Exchange Olimpia Milan	Munich
20:30 (CET)	Scoring by quarter: 22-23, 20-11, 19-16, 17-14
EuroLeague TV, Eurosport 2, Magenta Sport	Pts: Lučić 18; Rebs: Monroe 10; Asts: Monroe 4 PIR: Lučić 26	Boxscore	Pts: Scola 17; Rebs: Tarczewski 8 Asts: Rodríguez 6 PIR: Scola 17	Arena: Audi Dome; Attendance: 4270; Referees: Miguel Angel Perez (ESP), Fernando Rocha (POR), Eduard Udyanskyy (GBR)

11 October 2019 2	AX Armani Exchange Olimpia Milan (Italy)	85–81	(Lithuania) Žalgiris Kaunas	Assago (Milan)
20:45 (CET)	Scoring by quarter: 23-7, 20-29, 21-23, 21-22
EuroLeague TV, Eurosport Player	Pts: Rodríguez 17; Rebs: Tarczewski 6 Asts: Rodríguez 6 PIR: Rodríguez, Brooks 24	Boxscore	Pts: Walkup 19; Rebs: Hayes 5 Asts: Lekavičius 4 PIR: Walkup 24	Arena: Mediolanum Forum; Attendance: 7218; Referees: Juan Carlos Garcia (ESP), Mehdi Difallah (FRA), Ioannis Foufis (GRE)

17 October 2019 3	Panathinaikos OPAP Athens (Greece)	78–79	(Italy) AX Armani Exchange Olimpia Milan	Athens
20:30 (CET)	Scoring by quarter: 20-24, 18-14, 19-23, 21-18
EuroLeague TV, Eurosport Player	Pts: Calathes 23; Rebs: Mitoglou 10; Asts: Calathes, Rice 4 PIR: Calathes 27	Boxscore	Pts: Micov 18; Rebs: Scola 9 Asts: Rodríguez 5 PIR: Micov, Scola 18	Arena: O.A.C.A. Olympic Indoor Hall; Attendance: 10093; Referees: Daniel Hierrezuelo (ESP), Tomasz Trawicki (POL), Milan Nedovic (SLO)

25 October 2019 4	AX Armani Exchange Olimpia Milan (Italy)	87–74	(Turkey) Fenerbahce Beko Istanbul	Assago (Milan)
20:45 (CET)	Scoring by quarter: 20-11, 21-18, 25-26, 21-19
EuroLeague TV, Eurosport Player, beIN Sports 3	Pts: Rodríguez 22; Rebs: Tarczewski 9 Asts: Micov 7 PIR: Gudaitis 25	Boxscore	Pts: Veselý, Lauvergne 14; Rebs: Lauvergne 8 Asts: Sloukas 7 PIR: Veselý 21	Arena: Mediolanum Forum; Attendance: 9486; Referees: Christos Christodoulou (GRE), Saša Pukl (SLO), Uroš Nikolić (SRB)

29 October 2019 5	Alba Berlin (Germany)	78–81	(Italy) AX Armani Exchange Olimpia Milan	Berlin
20:00 (CET)	Scoring by quarter: 18-17, 15-9, 17-27, 28-28
EuroLeague TV, Magenta Sport, Eurosport Player	Pts: Siva 20; Rebs: Siva, Nnoko 3 Asts: Hermannsson 5 PIR: Giedraitis 20	Boxscore	Pts: Rodríguez 17; Rebs: Tarczewski 9 Asts: Micov, Rodríguez 4 PIR: Rodríguez 19	Arena: Mercedes-Benz Arena; Attendance: 9351; Referees: Borys Ryzhyk (UKR), Emilio Perez (ESP), Josip Radojkovic (CRO)

31 October 2019 6	AX Armani Exchange Olimpia Milan (Italy)	83–70	(Spain) FC Barcelona	Assago (Milan)
20:00 (CET)	Scoring by quarter: 15-20, 15-17, 22-21, 31-12
EuroLeague TV, Eurosport Player, DAZN	Pts: Rodríguez 17; Rebs: Scola 9 Asts: Rodríguez 7 PIR: Micov, Scola 22	Boxscore	Pts: Davies 15; Rebs: Claver, Mirotić, Tomić 5 Asts: Delaney 4 PIR: Davies 14	Arena: Mediolanum Forum; Attendance: 12064; Referees: Ilija Belošević (SRB), Emin Moğulkoç (TUR), Joseph Bissang (FRA)

7 November 2019 7	AX Armani Exchange Olimpia Milan (Italy)	81–74	(Spain) KIROLBET Baskonia Vitoria-Gasteiz	Assago (Milan)
20:45 (CET)	Scoring by quarter: 14-19, 26-15, 16-19, 25-21
EuroLeague TV, Eurosport Player, DAZN	Pts: Della Valle 15; Rebs: Tarczewski 7 Asts: Roll 4 PIR: Della Valle, Roll 19	Boxscore	Pts: Stauskas 15; Rebs: Shengelia 9 Asts: Henry 5 PIR: Shengelia 18	Arena: Mediolanum Forum; Attendance: 6732; Referees: Robert Lottermoser (GER), Matej Boltauzer (SLO), Hugues Thépénier (FRA)

14 November 2019 8	Khimki Moscow Region (Russia)	87–79	(Italy) AX Armani Exchange Olimpia Milan	Mytishchi
18:00 (CET)	Scoring by quarter: 22-25, 25-26, 18-14, 22-14
EuroLeague TV, Match TV, Eurosport Player	Pts: Shved 24; Rebs: Booker 6 Asts: Shved 7 PIR: Shved 23	Boxscore	Pts: Scola 16; Rebs: Scola 8 Asts: Nedović 7 PIR: Rodríguez 21	Arena: Mytishchi Arena; Attendance: 6781; Referees: Sreten Radović (CRO), Oļegs Latiševs (LAT), Anne Panther (GER)

19 November 2019 9	AX Armani Exchange Olimpia Milan (Italy)	92–88	(Israel) Maccabi Tel Aviv	Assago (Milan)
20:45 (CET)	Scoring by quarter: 21-21, 26-21, 24-22, 21-24
EuroLeague TV, Eurosport Player, 5GOLD	Pts: Scola 20; Rebs: Brooks, Scola 7 Asts: Rodríguez 11; PIR: Rodríguez 26	Boxscore	Pts: Wilbekin 25; Rebs: Black 9 Asts: Wilbekin 5 PIR: Wilbekin 26	Arena: Mediolanum Forum; Attendance: 10482; Referees: Damir Javor (SLO), Carlos Peruga (ESP), Jakub Zamojski (POL)

21 November 2019 10	AX Armani Exchange Olimpia Milan (Italy)	76–81	(Turkey) Anadolu Efes Istanbul	Assago (Milan)
20:45 (CET)	Scoring by quarter: 17-16, 22-25, 21-21, 16-19
EuroLeague TV, Eurosport Player, beIN Sports HD 3	Pts: Rodríguez 11; Rebs: Brooks 8 Asts: Rodríguez 9 PIR: Brooks 15	Boxcore	Pts: Larkin 17; Rebs: Pleiß 12; Asts: Micić 6 PIR: Pleiß 28	Arena: Mediolanum Forum; Attendance: 9022; Referees: Miguel Ángel Pérez (ESP), Borys Ryzhyk (UKR), Milan Nedović (SLO)

29 November 2019 11	Olympiacos Piraeus (Greece)	91–70	(Italy) AX Armani Exchange Olimpia Milan	Piraeus
20:30 (CET)	Scoring by quarter: 15-19, 25-18, 31-16, 20-17
EuroLeague TV, Eurosport Player, NOVASPORTS 1HD	Pts: Papanikolaou 17; Rebs: Milutinov 11; Asts: Spanoulis 5 PIR: Milutinov 30	Boxscore	Pts: Rodríguez 14; Rebs: Biligha, Scola 4 Asts: Roll, Rodríguez 3 PIR: Rodríguez 11	Arena: Peace and Friendship Stadium; Attendance: 7657; Referees: Matej Boltauzer (SLO), Mehdi Difallah (FRA), Jordi Aliaga (ESP)

5 December 2019 12	AX Armani Exchange Olimpia Milan (Italy)	67–77	(Serbia) Crvena Zvezda mts Belgrade	Assago (Milan)
20:45 (CET)	Scoring by quarter: 18-20, 22-19, 10-18, 17-20
EuroLeague TV, Eurosport Player, NOVA SPORT	Pts: Rodríguez 14; Rebs: Brooks 7 Asts: Rodríguez, Scola 3 PIR: Rodríguez 16	Boxscore	Pts: Brown 21; Rebs: Faye, Gist 6 Asts: Brown 7 PIR: Brown 29	Arena: Mediolanum Forum; Attendance: 8343; Referees: Robert Lottermoser (GER), Sérgio Silva (POR), Marcin Kowalski (POR)

13 December 2019 13	LDLC ASVEL Villeurbanne (France)	89–82	(Italy) AX Armani Exchange Olimpia Milan	Villeurbanne
20:45 (CET)	Scoring by quarter: 20-24, 18-21, 32-16, 19-21
EuroLeague TV, Eurosport Player, RMC Sport	Pts: Lighty 19; Rebs: Jekiri 12; Asts: Jackson, Taylor 4 PIR: Taylor 22	Boxscore	Pts: Scola 14; Rebs: Micov 5 Asts: Rodríguez 10; PIR: Rodríguez 17	Arena: Astroballe; Attendance: 5358; Referees: Emilio Pérez (ESP), Tomasz Trawicki (POL), Uroš Nikolić (SRB)

17 December 2019 14	Real Madrid (Spain)	76–67	(Italy) AX Armani Exchange Olimpia Milan	Madrid
20:00 (CET)	Scoring by quarter: 18-21, 12-18, 24-13, 22-15
EuroLeague TV, DAZN, Eurosport Player	Pts: Randolph 16; Rebs: Randolph, Tavares 7 Asts: Campazzo 12; PIR: Campazzo 25	Boxscore	Pts: Micov 22; Rebs: Brooks 9 Asts: Rodríguez, Brooks 2 PIR: Micov 18	Arena: WiZink Center; Attendance: 8933; Referees: Sreten Radović (CRO), Saša Pukl (SLO), Joseph Bissang (FRA)

19 December 2019 15	AX Armani Exchange Olimpia Milan (Italy)	78–71	(Spain) Valencia Basket	Assago (Milan)
20:45 (CET)	Scoring by quarter: 26-24, 17-19, 19-10, 16-18
EuroLeague TV, Eurosport Player, DAZN	Pts: Della Valle 15; Rebs: Tarczewski 10; Asts: Rodríguez 8 PIR: Tarczewski 22	Boxscore	Pts: Dubljević 20; Rebs: Tobey, Dubljević 6 Asts: Colom 6 PIR: Dubljević 21	Arena: Mediolanum Forum; Attendance: 7964; Referees: Borys Ryzhyk (UKR), Oļegs Latiševs (LAT), Miloš Koljenšić (MNE)

26 December 2019 16	CSKA Moscow (Russia)	78–75	(Italy) AX Armani Exchange Olimpia Milan	Kaliningrad
18:00 (CET)	Scoring by quarter: 19-13, 13-26, 27-22, 19-14
EuroLeague TV, MATCH!ARENA, Eurosport	Pts: Hackett 28; Rebs: Voigtmann 8 Asts: James 11; PIR: James 28	Boxscore	Pts: Gudaitis 13; Rebs: Tarczewski 10; Asts: Micov, Tarczewski 3 PIR: Tarczewski 23	Arena: Yantarny Sports Palace; Attendance: 6522; Referees: Daniel Hierrezuelo (ESP), Ilija Belošević (SRB),

3 January 2020 17	AX Armani Exchange Olimpia Milan (Italy)	73–72	(Russia) Zenit St Petersburg	Assago (Milan)
20:45 (CET)	Scoring by quarter: 19-17, 22-24, 14-15, 18-16
EuroLeague TV, Eurosport Player, MATCH!IGRA	Pts: Micov 13; Rebs: Luis Scola 10; Asts: Rodríguez 3 PIR: Tarczewski 24	Boxscore	Pts: Ayón 15; Rebs: Ayón 7 Asts: Albicy 5 PIR: Ayón 19	Arena: Mediolanum Forum; Attendance: 8809; Referees: Damir Javor (SLO), Ioannis Foufis (GRE), Amit Balak (ISR)

9 January 2020 18	AX Armani Exchange Olimpia Milan (Italy)	96–87	(Greece) Panathinaikos OPAP Athens	Assago (Milan)
20:45 (CET)	Scoring by quarter: 19-18, 25-16, 29-23, 23-30
EuroLeague TV, Eurosport Player, Nova Sports 2HD	Pts: Rodríguez 22; Rebs: Brooks 7 Asts: Moraschini, Roll, Rodríguez 3 PIR: Moraschini 18	Boxscore	Pts: Fredette 28; Rebs: Papapetrou 9 Asts: Calathes 11; PIR: Fredette 24	Arena: Mediolanum Forum; Attendance: 8654; Referees: Robert Lottermoser (GER), Emilio Pérez Pizarro (ESP), Uroš Nikolić (SRB)

14 January 2020 19	Anadolu Efes Istanbul (Turkey)	88–68	(Italy) AX Armani Exchange Olimpia Milan	Istanbul
18:30 (CET)	Scoring by quarter: 16-15, 26-18, 23-16, 23-19
EuroLeague TV, Eurosport Player, beIN Sports HD 4	Pts: Larkin 23; Rebs: Pleiß, Anderson, Simon 6 Asts: Simon 5 PIR: Larkin 30	Boxscore	Pts: Gudaitis 11; Rebs: Gudaitis 7 Asts: Nedović 5 PIR: Gudaitis 19	Arena: Sinan Erdem Dome; Attendance: 13708; Referees: Miguel Ángel Pérez (ESP), Saša Pukl (SLO), Mehdi Difallah (FRA)

16 January 2020 20	Maccabi Tel Aviv (Israel)	69–63	(Italy) AX Armani Exchange Olimpia Milan	Tel Aviv
20:05 (CET)	Scoring by quarter: 15-21, 16-11, 21-16, 17-15
EuroLeague TV, Eurosport 2, 5LIVE	Pts: Wilbekin 22; Rebs: Hunter 14; Asts: Wilbekin 4 PIR: Hunter 29	Boxscore	Pts: Sykes 11; Rebs: Gudaitis 9 Asts: many 2 PIR: Nedović	Arena: Menora Mivtachim Arena; Attendance: 10652; Referees: Juan Carlos García (ESP), Milivoje Jovčić (SRB), Sérgio Silva (POR)

24 January 2020 21	Fenerbahce Beko Istanbul (Turkey)	73–64	(Italy) AX Armani Exchange Olimpia Milan	Istanbul
18:45 (CET)	Scoring by quarter: 24-15, 17-16, 15-16, 17-17
EuroLeague TV, beIN Sports, Eurosport 2	Pts: Datome 14; Rebs: Datome 6 Asts: Sloukas 7 PIR: Veselý 18	Boxscore	Pts: Tarczewski 19; Rebs: Tarczewski 9 Asts: Rodríguez 6 PIR: Tarczewski 27	Arena: Ülker Sports and Event Hall; Attendance: 11697; Referees: Christos Christodoulou (GRE), Carlos Peruga (ESP), Sašo Petek (SLO)

30 January 2020 22	AX Armani Exchange Olimpia Milan (Italy)	79–78	(Germany) FC Bayern Munich	Assago (Milan)
21:15 (CET)	Scoring by quarter: 21-26, 17-19, 15-21, 26-12
EuroLeague TV, Eurosport Player, Magenta Sport	Pts: Micov 16; Rebs: Gudaitis 7 Asts: Rodríguez 10; PIR: Rodríguez 16	Boxscore	Pts: Barthel 18; Rebs: Zipser 6 Asts: Monroe 6 PIR: Zipser 6	Arena: Mediolanum Forum; Attendance: 7991; Referees: Matej Boltauzer (SLO), Oļegs Latiševs (LAT), Sinan İşgüder (TUR)

4 February 2020 23	AX Armani Exchange Olimpia Milan (Italy)	96–102	(Germany) Alba Berlin	Assago (Milan)
20:45 (CET)	Scoring by quarter: 25-27, 20-18, 28-30, 23-27
EuroLeague TV, Eurosport Player, Magenta Sport	Pts: Micov 20; Rebs: Tarczewski 7 Asts: Rodríguez 9 PIR: Rodríguez 25	Boxscore	Pts: Eriksson 22; Rebs: Cavanaugh 7 Asts: Siva 7 PIR: Eriksson, Sikma 19	Arena: Mediolanum Forum; Attendance: 6599; Referees: Damir Javor (SLO), Seffi Shemmesh (ISR), Josip Radojković (CRO)

7 February 2020 24	FC Barcelona (Spain)	84–80	(Italy) AX Armani Exchange Olimpia Milan	Barcelona
21:00 (CET)	Scoring by quarter: 23-17, 13-28, 27-14, 21-21
EuroLeague TV, DAZN, Eurosport 2	Pts: Delaney 26; Rebs: Tomić 7 Asts: Delaney 9 PIR: Delaney 37	Boxscore	Pts: Rodríguez 14; Rebs: Tarczewski 9 Asts: Rodríguez 5 PIR: Tarczewski 18	Arena: Palau Blaugrana; Attendance: 7013; Referees: Ilija Belošević (SRB), Mehdi Difallah (FRA), Gytis Vilius (LIT)

20 February 2020 25	AX Armani Exchange Olimpia Milan (Italy)	69–78	(Russia) Khimki Moscow Region	Assago (Milan)
20:45 (CET)	Scoring by quarter: 16-21, 22-18, 13-20, 18-19
EuroLeague TV, Eurosport Player, MATCH!IGRA	Pts: Rodríguez 18; Rebs: Tarczewski 9 Asts: Rodríguez 8 PIR: Rodríguez 22	Boxscore	Pts: Shved 18; Rebs: Jerebko 12; Asts: Shved 6 PIR: Jerebko 19	Arena: Mediolanum Forum; Attendance: 7457; Referees: Robert Lottermoser (GER), Miguel Angel Perez (ESP), Mario Majkić (SLO)

28 February 2020 26	Žalgiris Kaunas (Lithuania)	105–97(OT)	(Italy) AX Armani Exchange Olimpia Milan	Kaunas
19:00 (CET)	Scoring by quarter: 27-25, 26-19, 19-27, 19-20, Overtime: 14-6
EuroLeague TV, TVPlay Sports, Eurosport 2	Pts: Hayes 21; Rebs: Ulanovas 6 Asts: Ulanovas 6 PIR: Hayes, Ulanovas 25	Boxscore	Pts: Micov, Rodríguez, Tarczewski 18; Rebs: Micov 7 Asts: Rodríguez 8 PIR: Micov, Rodríguez 21	Arena: Žalgiris Arena; Attendance: 9405; Referees: Daniel Hierrezuelo (ESP), Robert Vyklicky (CZE), Eduard Udyanskyy (GBR)

3 March 2020 27	AX Armani Exchange Olimpia Milan (Italy)	73–78	(Spain) Real Madrid	Assago (Milan)
20:45 (CET)	Scoring by quarter: 25-11, 20-24, 10-11, 18-32
EuroLeague TV, Eurosport 2, DAZN	Pts: Moraschini 21; Rebs: Micov, Moraschini 6 Asts: Micov 3 PIR: Moraschini 24	Boxscore	Pts: Fernández 16; Rebs: Tavares 12; Asts: Laprovíttola 6 PIR: Tavares 29	Arena: Mediolanum Forum; Attendance: closed doors Referees: Christos Christodoulou (GRE), Fernando Rocha (POR), Miloš Koljenšić (MNE)

5 March 2020 28	Valencia Basket (Spain)	81–83(OT)	(Italy) AX Armani Exchange Olimpia Milan	Valencia
21:00 (CET)	Scoring by quarter: 12-19, 16-17, 20-12, 17-17, Overtime: 16-18
EuroLeague TV, DAZN, Eurosport 2	Pts: Abalde 21; Rebs: Abalde, Abalde, Labeyrie 6 Asts: Colom 7 PIR: Dubljević 31	Boxscore	Pts: Rodríguez 16; Rebs: Micov 7 Asts: Rodríguez 9 PIR: Rodríguez 20	Arena: La Fonteta; Attendance: closed doors Referees: Borys Ryzhyk (UKR), Damir Javor (SLO), Emin Moğulkoç (TUR)

On 12 March Euroleague decided to suspend the championship after the COVID-19 pandemic all over Europe and some European teams were as well affected. Despite the various attempts to restore the season the executive board decided to definitely cancel the season and the following games were never played.

13 March 2020 29	AX Armani Exchange Olimpia Milan (Italy)	vs.	(Greece) Olympiacos Piraeus	Berlin
20:45 (CET)
EuroLeague TV, Eurosport 2, NOVASPORTS 2HD				Arena: Mercedes-Benz Arena; Referees: Saša Pukl (SLO), Igor Dragojević (MNE), Sébastien Clivaz (SWI)

20 March 2020 30	Crvena Zvezda mts Belgrade (Serbia)	vs.	(Italy) AX Armani Exchange Olimpia Milan	Belgrade
19:00 (CET)
				Arena: Štark Arena

25 March 2020 31	KIROLBET Baskonia Vitoria-Gasteiz (Spain)	vs.	(Italy) AX Armani Exchange Olimpia Milan	Vitoria-Gasteiz
21:00 (CET)
				Arena: Fernando Buesa Arena

27 March 2020 32	AX Armani Exchange Olimpia Milan (Italy)	vs.	(France) LDLC ASVEL Villeurbanne	Assago (Milan)
20:45 (CET)
				Arena: Mediolanum Forum

2 April 2020 33	Zenit Saint Petersburg (Russia)	vs.	(Italy) AX Armani Exchange Olimpia Milan	Saint Petersburg
19:00 (CET)
				Arena: Sibur Arena

9 April 2020 34	AX Armani Exchange Olimpia Milan (Italy)	vs.	(Russia) CSKA Moscow	Assago (Milan)
20:45 (CET)
				Arena: Mediolanum Forum

=== Zurich Connect Final Eight ===
Milano qualified to the 2020 Italian Basketball Cup having ended the first half of the season in 2nd place. They lost the semifinal against Reyer Venezia.

==== Matches ====
13 February 2020 Quarter finals	AX Armani Exchange Olimpia Milano	86–62	Vanoli Cremona	Pesaro
18:00 (CET)	Scoring by quarter: 28-12, 16-19, 16-20, 26-11
Rai Sport HD, Eurosport 2	Pts: Tarczewski 14; Rebs: Tarczewski 9 Asts: Rodríguez 8 PIR: Tarczewski 23	Boxscore	Pts: Mathews 16; Rebs: Happ 10; Asts: Diener 4 PIR: Happ 24	Arena: Adriatic Arena; Referees: Michele Rossi, Massimiliano Filippini, Andrea Bongiorni

15 February 2020 Semifinals	AX Armani Exchange Olimpia Milano	63–67	Umana Reyer Venezia	Pesaro
18:45 (CET)	Scoring by quarter: 22-15, 9-14, 13-25, 19-13
Rai Sport HD, Eurosport 2	Pts: Rodríguez 15; Rebs: Tarczewski, Scola 9 Asts: Rodríguez 3 PIR: Scola 18	Boxscore	Pts: Watt 16; Rebs: Watt 10; Asts: Daye, De Nicolao, Chappell 3 PIR: Watt	Arena: Adriatic Arena; Referees: Tolga Sahin, Manuel Mazzoni, Guido Giovannetti

== Statistics ==
=== Individual statistics Serie A ===
No.	Player	GC	GP	GS	MPG	2FG%	3FG%	FT%	RPG	APG	SPG	BPG	EF	PPG
00	Amedeo Della Valle	19	19	2	13.2	48.3% (0.7/1.5)	25.8% (0.4/1.6)	97.0% (1.7/1.7)	1.5	0.4	0.8	0.0	4.3	4.4
1	Shelvin Mack ^{L}	8	8	7	21.1	50.0% (2.4/4.8)	19.2% (0.6/3.3)	33.3% (0.5/1.5)	3.3	3.4	1.1	0.0	6.3	7.1
5	Vladimir Micov	17	17	14	23.1	47.6% (2.3/4.8)	41.2% (1.6/4.0)	77.2% (2.6/3.4)	2.2	1.9	0.9	0.1	10.5	12.1
6	Paul Biligha	21	21	4	13.6	58.2% (1.5/2.6)	0.0% (0.0/0.2)	57.1% (0.4/0.7)	2.4	0.3	0.6	0.7	4.8	3.4
7	Artūras Gudaitis	8	8	4	14.8	63.0% (2.1/3.4)	-	73.0% (3.4/4.6)	4.6	0.3	0.8	0.1	11.8	7.6
9	Riccardo Moraschini	17	17	9	21.1	41.0% (0.9/2.3)	24.1% (0.8/3.2)	60.6% (1.2/1.9)	2.9	1.2	0.8	0.0	4.9	5.4
10	Michael Roll	16	16	9	21.6	57.1% (1.5/2.6)	42.9% (1.7/3.9)	83.3% (0.9/1.1)	2.6	1.7	0.7	0.1	8.1	9.0
13	Sergio Rodríguez	17	17	7	23.4	56.6% (2.5/4.5)	30.1% (1.6/5.5)	84.5% (2.9/3.4)	2.5	4.9	0.7	0.1	13.0	12.9
14	Leone Citterioi ^{Y}	1	0	0	0.0	-	-	-	0.0	0.0	0.0	0.0	0.0	0.0
14	Giuseppe Invernizzi ^{Y}	1	0	0	0.0	-	-	-	0.0	0.0	0.0	0.0	0.0	0.0
14	Riccardo Musumeci ^{Y}	1	0	0	0.0	-	-	-	0.0	0.0	0.0	0.0	0.0	0.0
15	Kaleb Tarczewski	19	19	14	20.9	64.8% (3.0/4.6)	0.0% (0.0/0.1)	72.4% (2.2/3.1)	5.8	0.3	0.6	0.6	13.2	8.2
16	Nemanja Nedović	10	10	5	20.7	46.3% (1.9/4.1)	36.5% (1.9/5.2)	93.1% (2.7/2.9)	2.7	2.6	0.9	0.0	11.7	12.2
19	Francesco Gravaghi ^{Y}	7	2	0	4.0	0.0% (0.0/1.5)	0.0% (0.0/0.5)	-	0.5	0.5	0.5	0.0	-1.0	0.0
19	Giovanni Tam ^{Y}	1	1	0	1.0	-	-	-	1.0	0.0	0.0	0.0	1.0	0.0
20	Andrea Cinciarini	21	21	6	13.1	30.8% (0.4/1.2)	47.6% (0.5/1.0)	75.0% (0.6/0.8)	2.0	1.6	0.4	0.0	4.0	2.8
22	Xavi Rey ^{L}	1	0	0	0.0	-	-	-	0.0	0.0	0.0	0.0	0.0	0.0
23	Christian Burns	20	15	0	7.6	56.3% (0.6/1.1)	37.5% (0.2/0.5)	54.5% (0.4/0.7)	2.1	0.1	0.4	0.1	2.9	2.2
28	Keifer Sykes	6	6	3	24.3	43.2% (2.7/6.2)	41.7% (1.7/4.0)	91.3% (3.5/3.8)	1.5	3.7	1.7	0.0	12.7	13.8
30	Aaron White ^{L}	8	8	0	11.9	33.3% (0.4/1.1)	36.4% (0.5/1.4)	100.0% (1.4/1.4)	1.6	0.6	0.3	0.0	4.4	3.6
32	Jeff Brooks	16	16	8	22.3	45.5% (1.6/3.4)	58.3% (0.9/1.5)	60.0% (0.8/1.3)	5.7	0.9	0.9	0.4	10.3	6.5
40	Luis Scola	15	15	13	19.0	57.5% (3.1/5.3)	56.0% (0.9/1.7)	64.2% (2.3/3.5)	3.2	0.9	0.3	0.1	10.5	11.2
Total		21				52.1%	36.2%	75.4%	39.1	15.7	7.7	2.0	94.0	80.3

- ^{Y}– Players that come from the youth team
- ^{L}– Players who left the team before the end of the season

=== Individual statistics Euroleague ===
No.	Player	GC	GP	GS	MPG	2FG%	3FG%	FT%	RPG	APG	SPG	BPG	EF	PPG
00	Amedeo Della Valle	24	21	0	12.0	50.0% (1.0/2.0)	50.0% (0.7/1.4)	83.7% (1.7/2.0)	0.9	0.5	0.5	0.0	5.9	5.9
1	Shelvin Mack ^{L}	11	11	2	17.3	37.5% (1.6/4.4)	33.3% (0.4/1.1)	75.0% (0.5/0.7)	1.8	1.8	0.5	0.0	3.2	4.9
5	Vladimir Micov	26	26	25	27.6	50.7% (2.7/5.3)	41.0% (1.7/4.0)	80.4% (1.7/2.2)	3.3	2.2	0.7	0.1	12.0	12.1
6	Paul Biligha	25	13	0	13.4	41.2% (1.1/2.6)	0.0% (0.0/0.3)	90.9% (0.8/0.8)	2.3	0.4	0.2	0.8	2.9	2.9
7	Artūras Gudaitis	19	19	1	16.9	50.0% (2.1/4.1)	100.0% (0.1/0.1)	75.3% (3.1/4.1)	4.4	0.5	0.4	0.9	10.4	7.3
9	Riccardo Moraschini	18	15	4	17.1	59.3% (1.1/1.8)	29.0% (0.6/2.1)	83.3% (1.3/1.6)	2.6	1.1	0.7	0.1	5.8	5.3
10	Michael Roll	28	28	19	21.9	47.6% (1.4/3.0)	43.8% (1.4/3.2)	86.7% (0.5/0.5)	2.5	1.6	0.5	0.0	6.9	7.5
13	Sergio Rodríguez	28	28	20	25.6	46.4% (2.5/5.5)	37.4% (2.1/5.5)	96.1% (1.8/1.8)	2.3	5.4	0.9	0.1	13.7	13.0
15	Kaleb Tarczewski	28	28	23	21.3	65.4% (3.2/4.9)	-	67.1% (1.8/2.6)	5.8	0.4	0.4	0.9	10.9	8.1
16	Nemanja Nedović	17	17	3	16.5	42.5% (1.0/2.4)	34.3% (1.4/4.1)	82.9% (1.7/2.1)	1.2	1.7	0.3	0.1	6.2	7.9
20	Andrea Cinciarini	16	13	2	6.4	20.0% (0.1/0.4)	16.7% (0.1/0.5)	25.0% (0.1/0.3)	0.7	0.6	0.2	0.0	0.4	0.5
22	Drew Crawford	7	7	0	17.3	50.0% (1.6/3.1)	35.7% (0.7/2.0)	75.0% (0.4/0.6)	1.9	0.3	0.6	0.1	2.4	5.7
23	Christian Burns	18	4	1	5.5	0.0% (0.0/1.0)	0.0% (0.0/0.5)	-	0.5	0.3	0.0	0.0	-2.0	0.0
28	Keifer Sykes	12	12	5	18.8	32.6% (1.2/3.6)	36.4% (1.3/3.7)	84.6% (0.9/1.1)	1.2	2.0	0.4	0.1	3.1	7.3
30	Aaron White ^{L}	16	15	3	10.2	37.5% (0.4/1.1)	25.0% (0.2/0.8)	83.3% (0.7/0.8)	1.4	0.3	0.1	0.1	1.9	2.1
32	Jeff Brooks	20	19	8	20.5	51.2% (1.1/2.2)	45.5% (0.5/1.2)	81.8% (0.5/0.6)	4.6	0.9	0.5	0.4	7.4	4.3
40	Luis Scola	28	28	24	19.2	50.0% (2.6/5.3)	35.3% (0.9/2.4)	65.5% (1.4/2.1)	4.4	1.1	0.5	0.1	8.5	9.2
Total		28				49.3%	37.9%	78.2%	33.5	15.8	5.2	2.8	82.4	78.1

- ^{Y}– Players that come from the youth team
- ^{L}– Players who left the team before the end of the season

=== Individual statistics Italian Cup ===
No.	Player	GC	GP	GS	MPG	2FG%	3FG%	FT%	RPG	APG	SPG	BPG	EF	PPG
00	Amedeo Della Valle	2	2	0	11.0	-	42.9% (1.5/3.5)	80.0% (2.0/2.5)	0.5	0.5	0.5	0.0	5.0	6.5
5	Vladimir Micov	2	2	2	26.0	38.5% (2.5/6.5)	50.0% (2.0/4.0)	0.0% (0.0/1.0)	2.5	1.5	0.5	0.0	8.5	11.0
6	Paul Biligha	2	2	0	10.0	0.0% (0.0/2.0)	-	66.7% (2.0/3.0)	1.0	0.0	0.5	0.5	-0.5	2.0
9	Riccardo Moraschini	2	0	0	0.0	-	-	-	0.0	0.0	0.0	0.0	0.0	0.0
10	Michael Roll	1	1	0	16.0	0.0% (0.0/1.0)	0.0% (0.0/2.0)	50.0% (1.0/2.0)	1.0	0.0	0.0	0.0	-3.0	1.0
13	Sergio Rodríguez	2	2	2	25.0	63.6% (3.5/5.5)	18.2% (1.0/5.5)	100.0% (2.0/2.0)	3.5	5.5	1.5	0.0	13.0	12.0
15	Kaleb Tarczewski	2	2	2	23.5	76.9% (5.0/6.5)	-	42.9% (1.5/3.5)	9.0	1.0	0.0	0.0	20.0	11.5
16	Nemanja Nedović	2	2	0	19.0	22.2% (1.0/4.5)	25.0% (1.5/6.0)	83.3% (2.5/3.0)	5.0	1.0	1.0	0.0	7.0	9.0
20	Andrea Cinciarini	2	2	2	25.5	25.0% (0.5/2.0)	42.9% (1.5/3.5)	50.0% (0.5/1.0)	4.0	3.0	1.5	0.0	8.5	6.0
23	Christian Burns	2	1	0	8.0	0.0% (0.0/1.0)	0.0% (0.0/1.0)	-	3.0	1.0	0.0	0.0	2.0	0.0
28	Keifer Sykes	1	1	0	14.0	50.0% (2.0/4.0)	0.0% (0.0/3.0)	50.0% (2.0/4.0)	0.0	0.0	2.0	0.0	3.0	6.0
32	Jeff Brooks	2	2	0	20.5	50.0% (0.5/1.0)	0.0% (0.0/1.5)	50.0% (0.5/1.0)	6.0	0.5	1.5	0.0	6.5	1.5
40	Luis Scola	2	2	2	20.5	75.0% (4.5/6.0)	20.0% (0.5/2.5)	66.7% (1.0/1.5)	6.0	0.0	0.0	0.5	13.0	11.5
Total		2				50.0%	27.1%	62.8%	44.5	13.5	8.0	1.5	87.0	74.5

- ^{Y}– Players that come from the youth team
- ^{L}– Players who left the team before the end of the season

=== Season individual statistics ===
No.	Player	GC	GP	GS	MPG	2FG%	3FG%	FT%	RPG	APG	SPG	BPG	EF	PPG
00	Amedeo Della Valle	45	42	2	12.5	49.3% (0.8/1.7)	38.2% (0.6/1.6)	88.9% (1.7/1.9)	1.1	0.4	0.6	0.0	5.1	5.2
1	Shelvin Mack ^{L}	19	19	9	18.9	43.0% (1.9/4.5)	23.7% (0.5/2.0)	50.0% (0.5/1.1)	2.4	2.5	0.7	0.0	4.5	5.8
5	Vladimir Micov	45	45	41	25.8	48.9% (2.5/5.2)	41.4% (1.7/4.0)	77.4% (2.0/2.6)	2.8	2.1	0.8	0.1	11.3	12.0
6	Paul Biligha	48	36	4	13.3	49.5% (1.3/2.6)	0.0% (0.0/0.2)	71.0% (0.6/0.9)	2.3	0.3	0.4	0.7	3.8	3.2
7	Artūras Gudaitis	27	27	5	16.3	53.3% (2.1/3.9)	100.0% (0.0/0.0)	74.6% (3.1/4.2)	4.4	0.4	0.5	0.7	10.8	7.4
9	Riccardo Moraschini	37	32	13	19.2	48.5% (1.0/2.1)	25.9% (0.7/2.7)	70.2% (1.3/1.8)	2.8	1.1	0.7	0.0	5.3	5.3
10	Michael Roll	45	45	28	21.6	50.4% (1.4/2.8)	42.9% (1.5/3.4)	82.9% (0.6/0.8)	2.5	1.6	0.6	0.1	7.1	7.9
13	Sergio Rodríguez	47	47	29	24.8	50.4% (2.6/5.1)	34.0% (1.9/5.5)	90.3% (2.2/2.4)	2.4	5.2	0.9	0.1	13.4	12.9
15	Kaleb Tarczewski	49	49	39	21.2	65.8% (3.2/4.8)	0.0% (0.0/0.0)	68.1% (1.9/2.8)	5.9	0.4	0.4	0.8	12.1	8.3
16	Nemanja Nedović	29	29	8	18.1	42.2% (1.3/3.1)	34.3% (1.6/4.6)	87.1% (2.1/2.4)	2.0	2.0	0.6	0.0	8.1	9.5
19	Francesco Gravaghi ^{Y}	7	2	0	4.0	0.0% (0.0/1.5)	0.0% (0.0/0.5)	-	0.5	0.5	0.5	0.0	-1.0	0.0
19	Giovanni Tam ^{Y}	1	1	0	1.0	-	-	-	1.0	0.0	0.0	0.0	1.0	0.0
20	Andrea Cinciarini	39	36	10	11.4	28.6% (0.3/1.0)	41.2% (0.4/0.9)	63.6% (0.4/0.6)	1.6	1.3	0.4	0.0	2.9	2.1
22	Drew Crawford	7	7	0	17.3	50.0% (1.6/3.1)	35.7% (0.7/2.0)	75.0% (0.4/0.6)	1.9	0.3	0.6	0.1	2.4	5.7
23	Christian Burns	40	20	1	7.2	42.9% (0.5/1.0)	27.3% (0.2/0.6)	54.5% (0.3/0.6)	1.9	0.2	0.3	0.1	1.9	1.7
28	Keifer Sykes	19	19	8	20.3	38.1% (1.7/4.4)	36.6% (1.4/3.7)	85.0% (1.8/2.1)	1.2	2.4	0.9	0.1	6.1	9.3
30	Aaron White ^{L}	24	23	3	10.8	36.0% (0.4/1.1)	30.4% (0.3/1.0)	91.3% (0.9/1.0)	1.5	0.4	0.2	0.0	2.8	2.6
32	Jeff Brooks	38	37	16	21.3	48.0% (1.3/2.6)	49.0% (0.6/1.3)	66.7% (0.6/0.9)	5.1	0.9	0.7	0.4	8.6	5.1
40	Luis Scola	45	45	39	19.2	53.8% (2.9/5.3)	39.8% (0.9/2.2)	64.9% (1.6/2.5)	4.0	1.0	0.4	0.1	9.4	10.0
Total		51				50.4%	36.7%	76.2%	36.2	15.7	6.3	2.4	87.4	78.9

- ^{Y}– Players that come from the youth team
- ^{L}– Players who left the team before the end of the season

=== Individual game highs ===
	Total	Player	Opponent
Points	28	Sergio Rodríguez	vs (Italy) Brindisi (13 Oct.)
Total Rebounds	12	Kaleb Tarczewski	vs (Italy) Reggio Emilia (1 Dec.)
Assists	11	Sergio Rodríguez	vs (Israel) Maccabi (19 Nov.)
Blocks	4	Jeff Brooks	vs (Turkey) Efes (21 Nov.)
Blocks	4	Paul Biligha	@ (Israel) Maccabi (16 Jan.)
Blocks	4	Kaleb Tarczewski	@ (Turkey) Fenerbahçe (24 Jan.)
Steals	4	Sergio Rodríguez	@ (Russia) Khimki (14 Nov.)
Steals	4	Keifer Sykes	@ (Italy) Trieste (26 Jan.)
Steals	4	Riccardo Moraschini	vs (Spain) Real Madrid (3 Mar.)
Efficiency	31	Artūras Gudaitis	vs (Italy) Treviso (12 Jan.)
2-point field goal percentage^{1}	100% (5/5)	Kaleb Tarczewski	@ (Italy) Roma (27 Oct.)
2-point field goal percentage^{1}	100% (5/5)	Michael Roll	@ (Russia) CSKA (26 Dec.)
3-point field goal percentage	100% (3/3)	Michael Roll	@ (Italy) Venezia (15 Dec.)
Free throw percentage	100% (9/9)	Keifer Sykes	vs (Italy) Treviso (12 Jan.)
Turnovers	5	Sergio Rodríguez	vs (Italy) Trieste (6 Oct.) vs (Turkey) Fenerbahçe (25 Oct.) @ (Italy) Roma (27 Oct.) @ (Germany) Berlin (29 Oct.)
Turnovers	5	Keifer Sykes	vs (Russia) Zenit (3 Jan.)
Turnovers	5	Riccardo Moraschini	vs (Spain) Real Madrid (3 Mar.)
Minutes	35.5	Sergio Rodríguez	vs (Lithuania) Žalgiris ^{OT} (28 Feb.)

- ^{1}– at least 5 attempts
- ^{OT}– match ended in overtime

	Total	Player	Opponent
2-point field goals made	9	Kaleb Tarczewski	@ (Turkey) Fenerbahçe (24 Jan.)
2-point field goals attempted	12	Luis Scola	@ (Russia) Khimki (14 Nov.) vs (Italy) Cantù (5 Jan.)
2-point field goals attempted	12	Keifer Sykes	@ (Italy) Brescia (19 Jan.)
3-point field goals made	7	Sergio Rodríguez	vs (Italy) Brindisi (13 Oct.)
3-point field goals attempted	11	Sergio Rodríguez	vs (Italy) Brindisi (13 Oct.)
Free throws made	9	Vladimir Micov	@ (Italy) Cremona (20 Oct.)
Free throws made	9	Keifer Sykes	vs (Italy) Treviso (12 Jan.)
Free throws made	9	Nemanja Nedović	vs (Germany) B.Munich (30 Jan.)
Free throws attempted	12	Nemanja Nedović	vs (Germany) B.Munich (30 Jan.)
Offensive Rebounds	6	Jeff Brooks	vs (Italy) Reggio Emilia (1 Dec.)
Defensive Rebounds	8	Luis Scola	vs (Russia) Zenit (3 Jan.) vs (Italy) Venezia (15 Feb c.i.)
Defensive Rebounds	8	Kaleb Tarczewski	@ (Spain) Barcelona (7 Feb.)

=== Team game highs ===
Statistic	Total	Opponent
Points	97	vs (Lithuania) Žalgiris ^{OT} (28 Feb.)
Total Rebounds	50	vs (Italy) Reggio Emilia (1 Dec.)
Assists	28	vs (Italy) Trieste (6 Oct.) vs (Germany) Berlin (4 Feb.)
Blocks	8	vs (Turkey) Efes (22 Nov.)
Steals	10	vs (Italy) Trieste (6 Oct.) @ (Italy) Roma (27 Oct.) vs (Italy) Reggio Emilia (1 Dec.) vs (Italy) Trento (22 Dec.) vs (Italy) Cantù (5 Jan.) @ (Italy) Trieste (26 Jan.)
Efficiency	137	vs (Italy) Treviso (12 Jan.)
2-point field goal percentage	72.2%	vs (Italy) Varese (3 Nov.)
3-point field goal percentage	53.8%	@ (Greece) Panathinaikos (25 Oct.)
Free throw percentage	95.0%	vs (Spain) Baskonia (7 Nov.)
Turnovers	19	@ (Germany) Berlin (29 Oct.)

- ^{OT}– match ended in overtime

Statistic	Total	Opponent
2-point field goals made	26	vs (Spain) Valencia (19 Dec.) @ (Turkey) Fenerbahçe (24 Jan.)
2-point field goals attempted	49	@ (Italy) F. Bologna (17 Nov.) @ (Spain) Real Madrid (17 Dec.)
3-point field goals made	14	vs (Italy) Brindisi (13 Oct.) @ (Greece) Panathinaikos (25 Oct.) vs (Spain) Barcelona (1 Nov.) vs (Greece) Panathinaikos (9 Jan.)
3-point field goals attempted	33	vs (Germany) Berlin (4 Feb.)
Free throws made	36	vs (Italy) Treviso (12 Jan.)
Free throws attempted	45	vs (Italy) Treviso (12 Jan.)
Offensive Rebounds	23	vs (Italy) Reggio Emilia (1 Dec.)
Defensive Rebounds	34	@ (Italy) Pesaro (8 Dec.)
