= Paul Biligha =

Italian basketball player

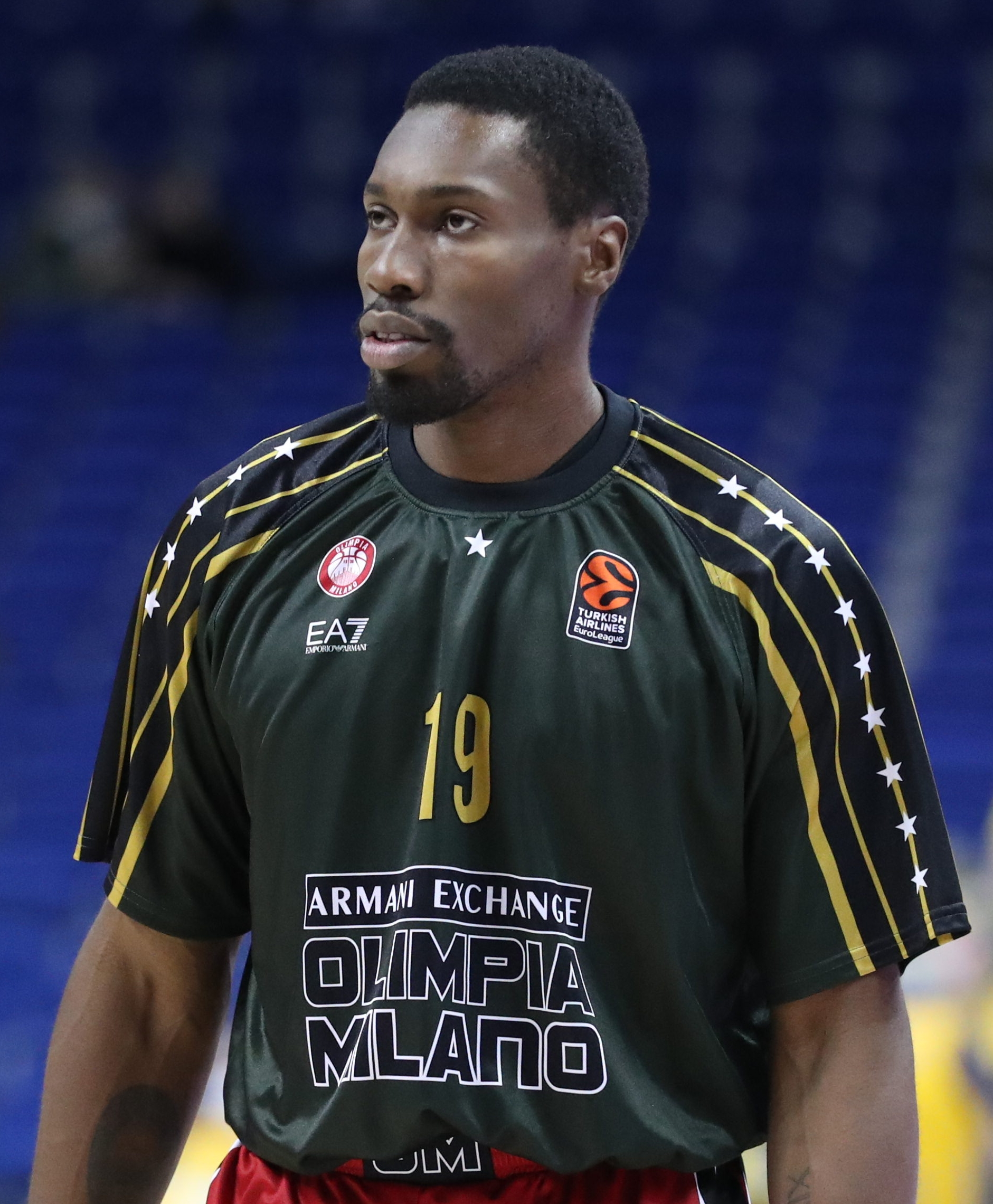
- Biligha with Olimpia Milano in 2021

Free agent
- Position: Center

Personal information
- Born: 31 May 1990 (age 36) Perugia, Italy
- Listed height: 2.00 m (6 ft 7 in)
- Listed weight: 100 kg (220 lb)

Career information
- Playing career: 2008–present

Career history
- 2008–2012: UC Casalpusterlengo
- 2008–2009: →Verolanuova
- 2010: →Pallacanestro Crema
- 2010–2011: →Pavia
- 2012–2014: Scandone Avellino
- 2014–2015: Ferentino
- 2015–2017: Vanoli Cremona
- 2017–2019: Reyer Venezia
- 2019–2023: Olimpia Milano
- 2023–2024: Aquila Trento
- 2024–2026: Derthona Basket

Career highlights
- FIBA Europe Cup champion (2018); Italian League champion (2022); 2× Italian Cup winner (2021, 2022); Italian Super Cup winner (2020)

Paul Stephane Lionel Biligha (born 31 May 1990) is a Cameroonian-Italian professional basketball player who last played for Derthona Basket of the Italian Lega Basket Serie A (LBA). Standing at 2.00 metres (6 feet 7 inches), he plays at the center position.

== Professional career ==
Biligha was born in Perugia, Italy in 1990 into a family of Italian and Cameroonian heritage.

He started playing in Cameroon where he lived from the age of 8 to 16. Once back in Italy, he grew as a basketball player in the Florence youth team and later Casalpusterlengo, Verolanuova, Crema and Pavia.

In summer 2012 Biligha signed with Sidigas Avellino in LBA, where he stayed for two seasons. In 2014 went to Basket Ferentino in Serie A2 Basket.

On 26 June 2015 Biligha returned in LBA with a two-year contract with Vanoli Cremona.

In July 2017 he became a player of 2017 Italian League champions, Reyer Venezia. In May 2018, he won the FIBA Europe Cup with Reyer.

He signed with Olimpia Milano for the 2019–20 season and spent four seasons there, until 29 July 2023.

On 29 July 2023 he signed with Aquila Trento of the Italian Lega Basket Serie A (LBA).

On 1 July 2024 he signed with Derthona Basket of the Italian Lega Basket Serie A (LBA).

== National team career ==
Bilingha made his debut with the Under-20 Italian national under-20 team during the 2010 FIBA Europe Under-20 Championship, playing eight games.

In 2017, he made it into the final squad of the Italian national team. He participated in EuroBasket 2017, held in Israel.
