= Adam Smith (basketball) =

American basketball player (born 1992)

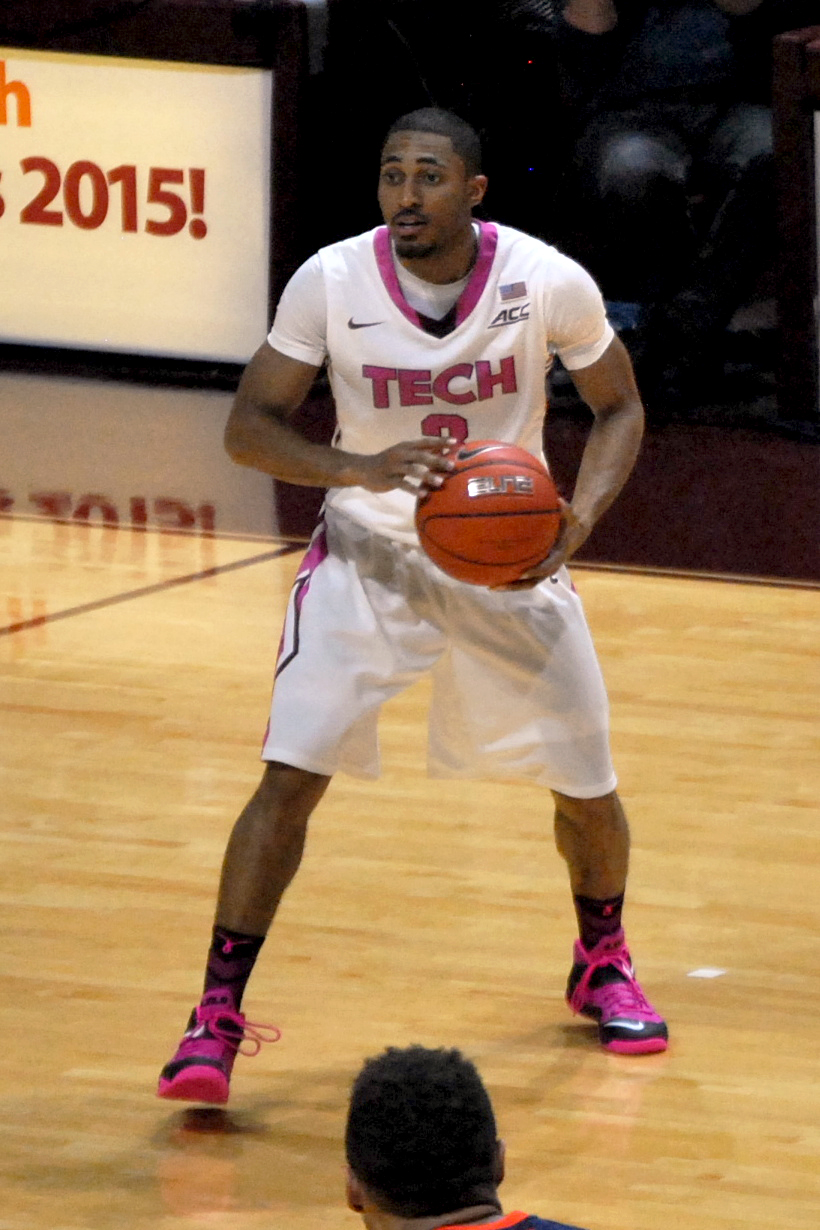
- Smith in action with Virginia Tech

Free agent
- Position: Point guard / shooting guard

Personal information
- Born: November 8, 1992 (age 34) Jonesboro, Georgia
- Listed height: 6 ft 1 in (1.85 m)
- Listed weight: 170 lb (77 kg)

Career information
- High school: Fayette County (Fayetteville, Georgia)
- College: UNC Wilmington (2011–2012); Virginia Tech (2013–2015); Georgia Tech (2015–2016)
- NBA draft: 2016: undrafted
- Playing career: 2016–present

Career history
- 2016–2017: Roseto Sharks
- 2017: Élan Chalon
- 2017–2018: Socar Petkim
- 2018: Pallacanestro Orzinuovi
- 2018: Orlandina
- 2018–2019: Ravenna
- 2019–2020: PAOK Thessaloniki
- 2020–2021: Ionikos Nikaias
- 2021: Zielona Góra
- 2021: Merkezefendi Bld. Denizli Basket
- 2021–2022: Hapoel Holon
- 2022–2024: Bilbao Basket
- 2024–2025: KK Split
- 2025–2026: Hapoel HaEmek

Career highlights
- Israeli League champion (2022); Italian Third Division Top Scorer (2017); Second-team Parade All-American (2011)

Adam Terrell Smith (born November 8, 1992) is an American professional basketball player, who most recently played for Hapoel HaEmek of the Israeli Basketball Premier League. Standing at 6 ft 1 in (1.85 m), he plays at both the point guard and shooting guard positions.

== High school career ==
Smith played high school basketball with Fayette County High School in Fayetteville, Georgia.

== College career ==
Smith played with three colleges from 2011 to 2016. His best scoring season was 2015–16 with Georgia Tech, in which he scored 15 points per game.

== Professional career ==
Smith started his professional career with the Italian club Roseto. He was the second leading scorer of Serie A2, averaging 23,6 points per game.

During the 2017–18 season, Smith played for four clubs. He started the season with Élan Chalon. On November 19, 2017, he joined Socar Petkim, where he stayed until February. He then played with Pallacanestro Orzinuovi and Orlandina Basket until the end of the season. In 2018 he joined Ravenna, where he averaged 23.9 points, 4.1 rebounds and 2.9 assists per game.

On August 28, 2019, Smith signed with Greek club PAOK. Smith emerged as the MVP for the 14th fixture of the Greek Basket League after an important 101-84 victory over Aris. On February 19, 2020 Smith left PAOK due to late payments and a breach of contract.

Smith then signed with Ionikos Nikaias on September 18, 2020. In 14 games with the Greek team, he averaged 16.1 points, 2.1 rebounds, and 4.4 assists. On March 12, 2021, Smith transferred to Polish club Zielona Góra, replacing the injured Nikos Pappas.

On July 27, 2021, he has signed with Merkezefendi Belediyesi Denizli Basket of the Basketbol Süper Ligi.

On December 16, 2021, he signed with Hapoel Holon of the Israel Basketball Premier League.

On March 10, 2025, he signed with Split.
