= Claudio Velluti =

Italian basketball player (1939–2024)

Personal information
- Born: 15 April 1939 Cagliari, Italy
- Died: 6 March 2024 (aged 84)

Career information
- Playing career: 1954–1975

Career history
- 1954–1959: Olimpia Cagliari
- 1959–1962: Olimpia Milano
- 1964–1975: Brill Cagliari

Claudio Velluti (15 April 1939 – 6 March 2024) was an Italian basketball player. He played for Olimpia Cagliari and Olimpia Milano, as well as two games for the Italy national team, with whom he won the 1963 Mediterranean Games.
