= Aaron White (basketball) =

American basketball player (born 1992)

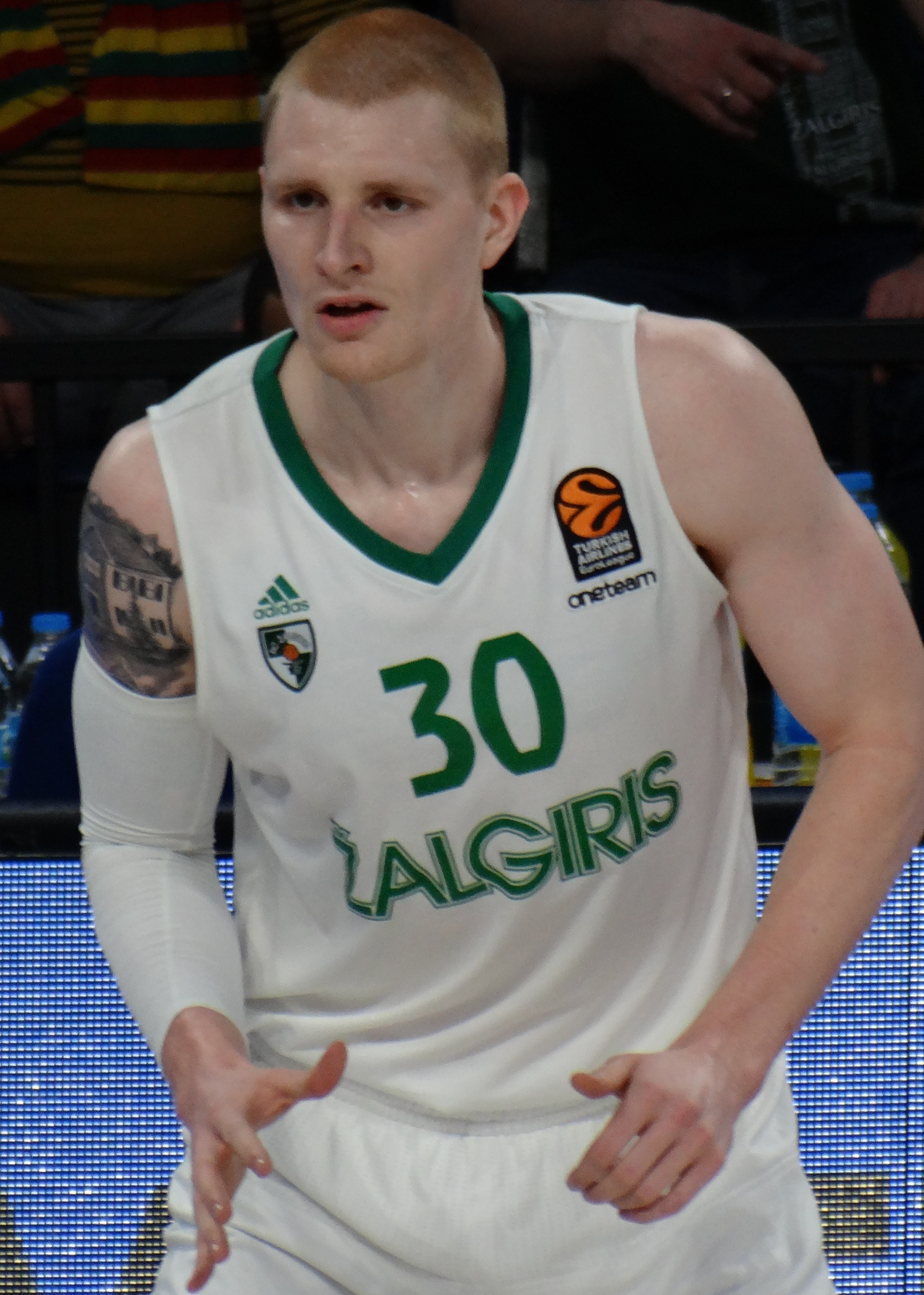
- White with Žalgiris Kaunas in 2018

No. 30 – SeaHorses Mikawa
- Position: Power forward
- League: B.League

Personal information
- Born: September 10, 1992 (age 34) Strongsville, Ohio, U.S.
- Listed height: 6 ft 9 in (2.06 m)
- Listed weight: 230 lb (104 kg)

Career information
- High school: Strongsville (Strongsville, Ohio)
- College: Iowa (2011–2015)
- NBA draft: 2015: 2nd round, 49th overall pick
- Drafted by: Washington Wizards
- Playing career: 2015–present

Career history
- 2015–2016: Telekom Baskets Bonn
- 2016–2017: Zenit Saint Petersburg
- 2017–2019: Žalgiris Kaunas
- 2019–2020: Olimpia Milano
- 2020: Tenerife
- 2020–2021: Panathinaikos
- 2021–2022: Crvena zvezda
- 2022: Budućnost
- 2022–2023: Darüşşafaka
- 2023–2024: Kumamoto Volters
- 2024–2025: Toyama Grouses
- 2025–present: SeaHorses Mikawa

Career highlights
- FIBA Intercontinental Cup champion (2020); ABA League champion (2022); Serbian League champion (2022); Serbian Cup winner (2022); Lithuanian King Mindaugas Cup winner (2018); 2× Lithuanian LKL champion (2018, 2019); Greek League champion (2021); Greek Cup winner (2021); First-team All-Big Ten (2015); Third-team All-Big Ten – Media (2013); Big Ten All-Freshman team (2012)
- Stats at Basketball Reference

Aaron Richard White (born September 10, 1992) is an American professional basketball player for SeaHorses Mikawa of the B.League. He played college basketball for the Iowa Hawkeyes.

== College career ==
At the conclusion of his junior season, White was named third-team All-Big Ten. He scored 26 points in Iowa's 83–52 win over Davidson in the Round of 64 of the 2015 NCAA Tournament. As a senior, he earned first-team All-Big Ten honors from the coaches and media.

College recruiting
Name	Hometown	School	Height	Weight	Commit date
Aaron White; SF	Strongsville, Ohio	Strongsville High School	6 ft 8 in (2.03 m)	215 lb (98 kg)	Mar 9, 2010
Aaron White; SF	Recruit ratings: Scout: Rivals: 247Sports: ESPN:				
Overall recruit ranking:
Note: In many cases, Scout, Rivals, 247Sports, On3, and ESPN may conflict in their listings of height and weight.; In these cases, the average was taken. ESPN grades are on a 100-point scale.; Sources: "ESPN- Iowa Hawkeyes Men's Basketball Recruiting". ESPN.; "2012 Team Ranking". Rivals.

== Professional career ==
On June 25, 2015, White was selected with the 49th overall pick in the 2015 NBA draft by the Washington Wizards. He later joined the Wizards for the 2015 NBA Summer League where he averaged 3.0 points and 3.7 rebounds in six games. On July 26, 2015, he signed a one-year deal with Telekom Baskets Bonn of the Basketball Bundesliga. In June 2016, his contract expired and he left the team in pursuit of an NBA contract with the team that drafted him the year prior, the Washington Wizards. In five games played for the Wizards in the 2016 NBA Summer League, he averaged 7.2 points and 5.2 rebounds.

For the 2016–17 season, White signed with Zenit Saint Petersburg of the VTB United League and EuroCup.

On June 13, 2017, White signed with the Lithuanian team Žalgiris Kaunas. In his first season with the club, he averaged 8.9 points and 4.4 rebounds over 36 EuroLeague games. In 2018–19 season, White's production dropped slightly, as he averaged 8.2 points and 4.2 rebounds over 34 EuroLeague games.

On July 14, 2019, White signed a deal with the Italian team Olimpia Milano but transferred to Tenerife in January.

On August 6, 2020, White officially signed a one-year contract with Panathinaikos of the Greek Basket League and the EuroLeague.

On June 29, 2021, White signed a two-year contract with Crvena zvezda of the Basketball League of Serbia, the Adriatic League and the EuroLeague.

On September 13, 2022, White signed with Budućnost VOLI of the Adriatic League and Eurocup. On December 7, 2022, he left the club on a mutual agreement.

On December 25, 2022, White signed with Darüşşafaka of the Turkish Basketbol Süper Ligi (BSL).

On June 28, 2023, White signed with Kumamoto Volters of the B.League.

On July 30, 2024, White signed with Toyama Grouses of the B.League.

=== NBA draft rights ===
On June 25, 2015, White was selected by the Washington Wizards with the 49th overall pick in the second round of the 2015 NBA draft. On July 6, 2019, his draft rights were traded to the Brooklyn Nets in a three-team trade.

== Career statistics ==
Legend
GP	Games played	GS	Games started	MPG	Minutes per game
FG%	Field-goal percentage	3P%	3-point field-goal percentage	FT%	Free-throw percentage
RPG	Rebounds per game	APG	Assists per game	SPG	Steals per game
BPG	Blocks per game	PPG	Points per game	PIR	Performance index rating
**Bold**	Career high

=== EuroLeague ===
*	Led the league

Year	Team	GP	GS	MPG	FG%	3P%	FT%	RPG	APG	SPG	BPG	PPG	PIR
2017–18	Žalgiris	**36***	2	22.4	**.538**	**.385**	.747	**4.4**	1.0	**.6**	**.4**	**8.9**	**10.2**
2018–19	Žalgiris	34	**23**	**24.9**	.519	.333	.791	4.2	.7	.4	.2	8.2	10.0
2019–20	Milano	15	3	10.1	.321	.250	.833	1.4	.3	.1	.1	2.1	1.9
2020–21	Panathinaikos	33	17	22.4	.500	.365	.806	4.0	1.0	.5	.2	7.3	9.0
2021–22	Crvena zvezda	18	9	18.1	.373	.297	**.839**	3.6	**1.2**	**.6**	.1	5.5	7.4
Career		136	54	21.1	.495	.346	.789	3.8	.9	.5	.2	7.2	8.6

=== Domestic leagues ===
Year	Team	League	GP	MPG	FG%	3P%	FT%	RPG	APG	SPG	BPG	PPG
2015–16	(Germany) Telekom Baskets Bonn	Basketball Bundesliga	34	27.4	53.1%	36.2%	75.0%	5.7	1.2	0.8	0.3	13.4
2016–17	(Russia) Zenit Saint Petersburg	VTB United League	30	24.1	44.5%	37.6%	65.6%	6.6	1.3	0.8	0.4	9.3
2017–18	(Lithuania) Žalgiris	LKL	45	17.6	58.8%	39.6%	67.8%	4.4	0.8	0.5	0.2	8.0
2018–19	(Lithuania) Žalgiris	LKL	40	19.4	54.0%	43.9%	77.6%	4.2	1.0	0.7	0.2	8.6
2019–20	(Italy) AX Armani Exchange Milano	Serie A	8	11.9	30.8%	36.4%	100%	1.6	0.6	0.3	0.0	3.6
2019–20	(Spain) Iberostar Tenerife	Liga ACB	8	22.1	50.0%	36.8%	81.8%	4.1	0.6	0.5	0.1	7.3
2020–21	(Greece) Panathinaikos B.C.	Greek Basket League	30	16.3	53.0%	41.3%	89.3%	2.7	0.7	0.6	0.1	5.8
2021–22	(Serbia) KK Crvena zvezda	ABA League	21	16.7	44.9%	29.1%	78.3%	3.1	1.5	0.5	0.2	7.1

=== College ===
Year	Team	GP	GS	MPG	FG%	3P%	FT%	RPG	APG	SPG	BPG	PPG
2011–12	Iowa	35	14	23.8	.504	.279	.699	5.7	0.9	0.9	0.7	11.1
2012–13	Iowa	38	38	29.2	.468	.227	.748	6.2	1.3	1.1	0.7	12.8
2013–14	Iowa	33	33	28.1	.584	.258	.807	6.7	1.8	1.0	0.6	12.8
2014–15	Iowa	34	34	31.5	.521	.356	.819	7.3	1.4	1.3	0.5	16.4
Career		140	119	28.1	.517	.281	.773	6.4	1.4	1.1	0.6	13.3
