= Greg Howard (basketball) =

American basketball player

Personal information
- Born: January 8, 1948 (age 78) Pittsburgh, Pennsylvania, U.S.
- Listed height: 6 ft 9 in (2.06 m)
- Listed weight: 215 lb (98 kg)

Career information
- High school: Fifth Avenue (Pittsburgh, Pennsylvania)
- College: Hartnell College (1966–1967); New Mexico (1967–1969)
- NBA draft: 1970: 1st round, 10th overall pick
- Drafted by: Phoenix Suns
- Position: Power forward
- Number: 40, 44

Career history
- 1969–1970: Brill Cagliari
- 1970–1971: Phoenix Suns
- 1971–1972: Cleveland Cavaliers
- 1974–1975: ABC Nantes
- 1975–1977: Fribourg Olympic Basket
- 1977–1978: Sporting CP

Career highlights
- First-team All-WAC (1969)
- Stats at NBA.com
- Stats at Basketball Reference

Gregory Darryle Howard (born January 8, 1948) is an American former professional basketball player who played in the National Basketball Association (NBA) for two seasons.

== Career ==
Howard attended Fifth Avenue High School in Pittsburgh until 1966. After one year at Hartnell College, he enrolled at the University of New Mexico, playing for the New Mexico Lobos men's basketball team from 1967 to 1969. In 1968–69, he was the Lobos leading scorer (19.7 points per game). In a total of 45 games for New Mexico, he averaged 16.6 points and 10.1 rebounds per contest. Howard had 22 double-doubles for the Lobos.

After playing for one season in the Italian Serie A for Brill Cagliari, he was selected in the first round of 1970 NBA draft by the Phoenix Suns. He played the 1970–71 season with the team before being traded to the Cleveland Cavaliers in 1971. He appeared in a total of 92 NBA games, averaging 3.4 points and 2.5 rebounds a contest.

In 1974–75, Howard played for ABC Nantes in France. From 1975 to 1977, he played for Fribourg Olympic Basket. His dominating and spectacular style of play was considered new for Swiss basketball. He moved to Portugal in 1977 and was signed by Sporting CP.

== Career statistics ==
Legend
GP	Games played	GS	Games started	MPG	Minutes per game
FG%	Field goal percentage	3P%	3-point field goal percentage	FT%	Free throw percentage
RPG	Rebounds per game	APG	Assists per game	SPG	Steals per game
BPG	Blocks per game	PPG	Points per game	**Bold**	Career high

=== NBA ===
==== Regular season ====
Year	Team	GP	MPG	FG%	FT%	RPG	APG	PPG
1970–71	Phoenix	44	**9.7**	**.393**	.638	**2.7**	**.6**	**3.9**
1971–72	Cleveland	**48**	8.9	.382	**.765**	2.3	**.6**	2.9
Career		92	9.3	.388	.697	2.5	.6	3.4
