= Mario Vascellari =

Italian basketball player (1951–2021)

Personal information
- Born: 8 September 1951
- Died: 22 May 2021 (aged 69); Cagliari, Sardinia, Italy
- Occupation: Basketball Player

Mario Vascellari (8 September 1951 – 22 May 2021) was an Italian basketball player.

== Biography ==
Vascellari started his career during the seventies playing in Serie A1 and A2 with the Olimpia Cagliari team. He then played with Libertas Oristanese, then again with Olimpia Cagliari and finally with the Esperia Cagliari, ending his career in 1984. Vascellari died on May 22, 2021, at the age of 69.
