= 2019–20 Pallacanestro Cantù season =

Pallacanestro Cantù
2019-20 season
- President: Davide Marson
- Head coach: Cesare Pancotto
- Arena: PalaDesio
- LBA: season cancelled (11th)

The 2019–20 season is Pallacanestro Cantù's 84th in existence and the club's 24th consecutive season in the top flight of Italian basketball.

== Overview ==
The 2019-20 season was hit by the coronavirus pandemic that compelled the federation to suspend and later cancel the competition without assigning the title to anyone. Cantù ended the championship in 11th position.

== Kit ==
Supplier: EYE Sport Wear / Sponsor: S.Bernardo-Cinelandia

Home	Away

== Players ==
Rodney Purvis was hired before the early conclusion of the season, therefore he didn't play any games with the team.

=== Current roster ===
S.Bernardo-Cinelandia Cantù roster
Players
Coaches

Pos.	No.	Nat.	Name	Ht.	Wt.	Age
SG	1	(United States)	Young, Cameron	1.98 m (6 ft 6 in)	93 kg (205 lb)	28 – 24 March 1996
SG	9	(Italy)	Procida, Gabriele	1.98 m (6 ft 6 in)	82 kg (181 lb)	22 – 1 June 2002
G	10	(United States)	Clark, Wes	1.84 m (6 ft 0 in)	83 kg (183 lb)	30 – 12 December 1994
PF	11	(Italy)	La Torre, Andrea (C)	2.02 m (6 ft 8 in)	101 kg (223 lb)	27 – 14 June 1997
C	13	(United States)	Hayes, Kevarrius	2.06 m (6 ft 9 in)	103 kg (227 lb)	28 – 5 March 1997
SG	15	(United States)	Purvis, Rodney (*)	1.93 m (6 ft 4 in)	93 kg (205 lb)	31 – 14 February 1994
PF	19	(United States) (Portugal)	Wilson, Jeremiah	2.04 m (6 ft 8 in)	98 kg (216 lb)	36 – 19 April 1988
G	20	(United States) (Liberia)	Ragland, Joe	1.82 m (6 ft 0 in)	85 kg (187 lb)	35 – 11 November 1989
SF	22	(United States)	Burnell, Jason	2.01 m (6 ft 7 in)	100 kg (220 lb)	27 – 15 August 1997
SG	25	(Italy)	Baparapè, Biram	1.90 m (6 ft 3 in)	83 kg (183 lb)	27 – 25 April 1997
C	27	(Italy)	Simioni, Alessandro	2.06 m (6 ft 9 in)	115 kg (254 lb)	27 – 10 March 1998
G/F	32	(Italy)	Pecchia, Andrea	1.97 m (6 ft 6 in)	90 kg (198 lb)	27 – 16 November 1997

Head coach

- (Italy) Cesare Pancotto

Assistant coach(es)

- (Italy) Marco Gandini
- (Italy) Antonio Visciglia

Legend

- (C) Team captain
- (*) Joined the team before the
  interruption and never played
- Injured

- Roster
Updated: February 25, 2020

Note: Flags indicate national team eligibility at FIBA-sanctioned events. Players may hold other non-FIBA nationalities not displayed.

=== Depth chart ===
Pos.	Starting 5	Bench 1	Bench 2
C	Kevarrius Hayes	Alessandro Simioni
PF	Jeremiah Wilson	Andrea La Torre
SF	Jason Burnell	Andrea Pecchia	Gabriele Procida
SG	Joe Ragland	Cameron Young	Biram Baparapè
PG	Wes Clark	Rodney Purvis

6+6 format (colours: Italian or homegrown players; foreign players; young players)

=== Squad changes ===
==== In ====
No.	Pos.	Nat.	Name	Age	Moving from		Type	Ends	Transfer fee	Date	Source
28	SG	(Italy) (Dominican Republic)	Yancarlos Rodriguez	25	Roseto Sharks	(Italy)	1 year	June 2020	Free	20 June 2019	
27	C	(Italy)	Alessandro Simioni	21	Imola	(Italy)	1 year	June 2020	Free	22 June 2019	
32	G/F	(Italy)	Andrea Pecchia	21	Treviglio	(Italy)	1 year	June 2020	Free	25 June 2019	
13	C	(United States)	Kevarrius Hayes	22	Florida Gators	(United States)	1 year	June 2020	Free	8 July 2019	
19	PF	(United States) (Portugal)	Jeremiah Wilson	31	Nantes	(France)	1 year	June 2020	Free	11 July 2019	
22	SG	(United States)	Jason Burnell	22	Jacksonville State Gamecocks	(United States)	1 year	June 2020	Free	17 July 2019	
10	G	(United States)	Wes Clark	24	New Basket Brindisi	(Italy)	1 year	June 2020	Free	23 July 2019	
7	SG	(United States)	Corban Collins	25	BC Luleå	(Sweden)	1 year	June 2020	Free	26 July 2019	
9	SG	(Italy)	Gabriele Procida	17	Team ABC Cantù	(Italy)	N/A	N/A	Free	24 August 2019	
1	SG	(United States)	Cameron Young	23	Quinnipiac Bobcats	(United States)	1 year	June 2020	Free	6 September 2019	
20	G	(Liberia) (United States)	Joe Ragland	30	Darüşşafaka	(Turkey)	1 year	June 2020	Free	9 December 2019	
0	SG	(United States)	Rodney Purvis	26	Hapoel Tel Aviv	(Israel)	end of the season	June 2020	Free	25 February 2020	

==== Out ====
No.	Pos.	Nat.	Name	Age	Moving to		Type	Transfer fee	Date	Source
0	SG	(United States)	Frank Gaines	28	Virtus Bologna	(Italy)	end of contract	Free	1 July 2019	
3	SG	(United States)	Tony Carr	21	Parma Perm	(Russia)	end of contract	Free	1 July 2019	
4	G	(United States)	Gerry Blakes	25	Oldenburg	(Germany)	end of contract	Free	1 July 2019	
8	SG	(Italy)	Salvatore Parrillo	26	Pallacanestro Orzinuovi	(Italy)	end of contract	Free	1 July 2019	
9	PF	(United States)	Shaheed Davis	25	Fukushima Firebonds	(Japan)	end of contract	Free	1 July 2019	
10	PG	(Italy)	Maurizio Tassone	28	Derthona Basket	(Italy)	end of contract	Free	1 July 2019	
17	F/C	(Italy)	Luca Pappalardo	19	Scandone Avellino	(Italy)	end of contract	Free	1 July 2019	
33	PF	(United States)	Tyler Stone	27	Piratas de Quebradillas	(Puerto Rico)	end of contract	Free	May 2019	
41	F/C	(United States)	Davon Jefferson	32	Capitanes de Arecibo	(Puerto Rico)	end of contract	Free	1 July 2019	
7	SG	(United States)	Corban Collins	25	Blu Basket Treviglio	(Italy)	mutual consent	Undisclosed	18 December 2019	
28	SG	(Italy) (Dominican Republic)	Yancarlos Rodriguez	25	Roseto Sharks	(Italy)	transfer	Undisclosed	16 January 2020	

==== Confirmed ====
No.	Pos.	Nat.	Name	Age	Moving from		Type	Ends	Transfer fee	Date	Source
25	SG	(Italy)	Biram Baparapè	27	USA Basket Empoli	(Italy)	3 year	June 2021	Free	19 September 2018	
11	PF	(Italy)	Andrea La Torre	27	Amici Udinese	(Italy)	3 year	June 2021	Free	8 November 2018	

==== Coach ====
Nat.	Name	Age.	Previous team		Type	Ends	Date	Replaces		Date	Type
(Italy)	Cesare Pancotto	64	Poderosa Montegranaro	(Italy)	1 + 1	2020 + 2021	11 June 2019	(Italy)	Nicola Brienza	28 May 2019	mutual consent

== Competitions ==
=== Serie A ===
Pos	Team	Pld	W	L	PF	PA	PD	Qualification or relegation
9	Dolomiti Energia Trento	21	11	10	1635	1665	−30	Qualification for EuroCup
10	Openjobmetis Varese	19	9	10	1570	1522	+48	
11	S.Bernardo-Cinelandia Cantù	20	9	11	1533	1580	−47	
12	Grissin Bon Reggio Emilia	21	9	12	1741	1763	−22	Qualification for FIBA Europe Cup
13	De' Longhi Treviso	21	8	13	1620	1664	−44	

Updated to match(es) played on 9 February 2020. Source: LBA
