= Olimpia Cagliari =

Amateur basketball club

- Leagues: Serie C
- Founded: 23 February 1953
- History: Olimpia Cagliari; 1953-196? U. S. Pallacanestro Cagliari; 196?-1980; Olimpia Cagliari; 2001-present
- Arena: PalaRockefeller
- Capacity: 2,266
- Location: Cagliari, Sardinia, Italy
- Team colors: Green and White
- President: Dario Corsi
- Head coach: Alessandro Sulis

Olimpia Cagliari is an Italian amateur basketball club based in Cagliari, Sardinia.

It is most famous for the period in the 1970s where, under the name Brill Cagliari, the team played in the first division Serie A.

== History ==
=== Early years (1953–1968) ===
Olimpia Cagliari was founded on 23 February 1953 when a group of youngsters, led by Bebi Mosca and with members such as brothers Antonio and Carlo Pirastu, split from Gruppo Sportivo Aquila (founded in 1944, the city's oldest basketball team) to form the club. Its numbers were swelled in the following years by a contingent from Esperia Cagliari, a club that would later become their fierce rivals. Starting from the regional leagues, the club moved up to the second division Serie B in 1965. The club would start a collaboration with football club Unione Sportiva Cagliari sometime during the second half of the 1960s and change its name to Unione Sportiva Pallacanestro Cagliari.

=== Amongst the elite, the Brill years (1968–1978) ===
Cagliari would beat Libertas Brindisi 62–56 in Naples during the 1968–69 promotion playoffs to move up to the first division Serie A. Renamed Brill Cagliari with the arrival of major sponsor Brill (a shoe shine brand) and now based in the newly opened PalaRockefeller arena, the Sardinians struggled in their first Serie A season. They won only three games in 1969–70 to go straight back down, obtaining their third win in the last game, against Virtus Bologna, on 12 April 1970 whilst the U.S. Cagliari football team won their league. They would return in 1972 by beating Sapori Siena after two overtimes for the promotion spot. Cagliari downed incumbent European and Intercontinental champions Ignis Varese 76–75 on 4 March 1973 thanks to Mario Vascellari's last minute block on Paolo Polzot, as they managed to avoid relegation that season. Led by American John Sutter, Brill would upset major teams such as Simmenthal Milano, Forst Cantù and the beformentioned Varese at home over the course of the next seasons. The club would play six successive seasons in the league, their best result a fifth place in 1976-77.

=== Decline and near-disappearance (1978–2001) ===
Cagliari lost the relegation play-outs against Mecap Vigevano at the end of the 1977–78 season and exited the Serie A for the second division (now Serie A2). Brill stopped sponsoring the team and a Sutter-coached squad only ended thirteenth (out of fourteen teams) the next season. After finishing the 1979–80 season in last place with only 8 points, the club was relegated to the Serie B. In parallel its parent organisation folded that same year because of financial problems. What followed was a succession of name and ownership changes for the club, who only survived through various mergers.

=== A modest rebirth (2001–present) ===
The club reemerged as an independent organisation in 2001 under president Dario Corsi and from the 2008–09 season started to play in the fifth division Divisione Nazionale C (DNC). Cagliari stayed in that league for six seasons without earning a promotion until the Sardinia committee of the Italian Basketball Federation organised an ad-hoc tournament for the best clubs on the island in order for one of them to promote before the DNC became nearly entirely regional. Olimpia beat two other clubs (the tournament was organised as a mini-league) to earn a place in the fourth division Serie B.

Prior to the season, the president was apprehensive over the sufficient funds needed to play in the Serie B (where travel is farther and more expensive), whilst the squad stayed relatively unchanged, though a declared partnership with Dinamo Basket Sassari saw one of their youth players arrive on loan. The pumas - named after their logo, changed in 2011 from a falcon to a puma – struggled at the higher level, winning only five games in twenty-six encounters over the 2014-15 season to finish dead last and be relegated. Plans to ask for an off-court reprieve were mooted over the summer, Olimpia returned to the Serie C – now completely regional except a restricted national finals round – with the aim of starting a multi-year project based on youth.

== Notable players ==
Olimpia Cagliari's first “foreign” (not from Sardinia) player, Piero Rigucci, was recruited in 1963. Its first genuinely foreign player was American Greg Howard who arrived in 1969.

1970's

- (Italy) Francesco Mastio 1 season: '79-'80
- (United States) Rowland Garrett 1 season: '79-'80
- (United States) Henry Ward 1 season: '77-'78
- (United States) Steve Puidokas 2 seasons: '77-'78, '79-'80
- (Italy) Marcello Exana 4 seasons: '76-'80
- (Argentina) Fernando Prato 1 season: '76-'77
- (Italy) Massimo Lucarelli 3 seasons: '75-'78
- (Argentina) Carlos Ferello 3 seasons: '75-'78
- (United States) John Sutter 2 seasons: '74-'77, '78-'79
- (Italy) Eligio De Rossi 5 seasons: '73-'78
- (United States) Don Holcomb 1 season: '72-'73
- (Italy) Danilo Nanni 3 seasons: '71-'73

1960's

- (Italy) Mario Vascellari 12 seasons: '69-'81
- (Italy) Tore Serra 10 seasons: '69-'79
- (Italy) Stefano Albanese 1 season: '69-'70
- (United States) Greg Howard 1 season: '69-'70
- (Italy) Alberto Pedrazzini ? seasons: '68?-'74?
- (Italy) Sandro Spinetti 7 seasons: '67-'74
- (Italy) Claudio Velluti 11 seasons: '64-'75
- (Italy) Gianfranco Pieroni ? seasons: '64-'?
- (Italy) Piero Rigucci 3 seasons: '63-'78

== Notable coaches ==
- (Italy) Otello Formigli 5 seasons: '69-'74
- (United States) Howie Landa 1 season: '74-'75
- (Italy) Carlo Rinaldi 3 seasons: '75-'78

== Sponsorship names ==
Throughout the years, due to sponsorship deals, it has been also known as:

- Brill Cagliari (1969-1978)
- Acentro Cagliari (1978-1980)
- Trony Cagliari (2009-2011)
- Olimpia Cagliari (2011-2013)
- Olimpia Ichnusa Cagliari (2013-2014)
- Olimpia "Trony" Cagliari (2014–15)
