= Basket Ravenna Piero Manetti =

- Nickname: Leoni Bizantini; Byzantine Lions
- Leagues: Serie A2 Basket
- Founded: 1984; 41 years ago
- Arena: Pala Mauro De Andrè
- Capacity: 3,500
- Location: Ravenna, Italy
- Main sponsor: Orasì
- President: Roberto Vianello
- Head coach: Andrea Mazzon
- Team captain: Andrea Raschi
- Championships: 1 Coppa Italia DNB
- Website: basketravenna.it
Home	Away

Basket Ravenna Piero Manetti, also known as Orasì Ravenna (after its title sponsor), is a Serie A2 Basket Italian basketball team based in Ravenna, Emilia-Romagna. Its colors are red and yellow and they are commonly referred as Leoni Bizantini (Byzantine Lions) because of the coat of arms of the city.

== History ==
Originally founded in 1984 and named Basket Ravenna Piero Manetti, it gained access to "Divisione Nazionale A Silver" during the 2012-2013 season. In the very same year, Basket Ravenna won its first cup, the Coppa Italia DNB. During the 2016-2017 Serie A2 Basket season, the team, guided by coach Antimo Martino, ends the regular season in 4th position and consequentially enters -for the first time in its history- the playoff. At the first round, the team overcomes Virtus Roma in a tough series won 3-1. At the quarter-finals, again Basket Ravenna successes against Scaligera Basket Verona in a hostile arena, winning the series for 3-0.

The winning strike ends in semi-finals by the hands of the Virtus Bologna (that lately will win the playoff, reaching Lega Basket Serie A.

During the 2017-2018 Serie A2 Basket season, Antimo Martino leads the team to the Coppa Italia finals, but fails to reach the playoff, ending the season in 9th place.

In June 2018, president Roberto Vianello announces Andrea Mazzon as the new head coach and Julio Trovato as the new general manager.

== Colors and symbol ==
Team colors are red and yellow. Home shirt is completely white with red collar, while the away shirt is completely red.

== Arena ==
Basket Ravenna Piero Manetti used to play its home matches in the PalaCosta in Ravenna until 2014-2015 season, when society chose the more capacious Pala De André.

== Chronicle ==
Basket Ravenna Piero Manetti chronicle
- 1984 · Foundation Basket Ravenna Piero Manetti.

- 2008-2009 · in Serie B amateurs.
- 2009-2010 · in Serie B amateurs.

- 2010-2011 · in Serie B amateurs.
- 2011-2012 · 6th in B round of Divisione Nazionale B, play-off semifinals for promotions.
- 2012-2013 · 1st in B round of Divisione Nazionale B, wins promotion play-off, → Promoted to Divisione Nazionale A.

Wins Coppa Italia di Divisione Nazionale B (1º title).

- 2013-2014 · 6th in Divisione Nazionale A Silver, quarter finals of promotion play-off.
- 2014-2015 · 6th in Divisione Nazionale A Silver.
- 2015-2016 · 9th in east conference of Serie A2 Basket.
- 2016-2017 · 4th in east conference of Serie A2 Basket, semifinals of promotion play-off.

== 2017-2018 roster ==
=== Depth chart ===
Pos.	Starting 5	Bench 1	Bench 2
C	Jerai Grant	Alessandro Esposito
PF	Stefano Masciadri	Alberto Chiumenti
SF	Giacomo Sgorbati	Andrea Raschi
SG	Rayvonte Rice	Matteo Montano	Emmanuele Scaccabarozzi
PG	Jacopo Giachetti	Donato Vitale	Francesco Cinti

Updated to August 25th 2017.

=== Staff ===
Head Coach:	ITA Massimo Cancellieri	
Assistant coaches:	ITA Massimo Bulleri	ITA Francesco Taccetti

== Notable players ==
- Adam Smith (born 1992), basketball player for Hapoel Holon in the Israel Basketball Premier League
