= Blu Basket 1971 =

- Nickname: BB1971
- Leagues: Serie A2 Basket
- Founded: 1971; 55 years ago
- Folded: February 7, 2026; 8 months ago
- History: Or.Sa. Treviglio (1971–1986); Bergamasca Country Basket Treviglio (1986–1999); Treviglio Basket (1999-2006); Blu Basket 1971 (2006–2026)
- Arena: PalaFacchetti
- Capacity: 2,880
- Location: Bergamo, Italy
- President: Stefano Mascio
- General manager: Euclide Insegna
- Website: blubasket.it
Home	Away

Blu Basket 1971 was an Italian professional basketball team tha was last located in Bergamo. Established in 1971, the team competed in Italy's Serie A2 Basket league.

The team was dissolved in 2026.
