= Trapani Shark =

Basketball team in Italy

- Nickname: Granata (Maroons); Trapanesi; Shark
- Leagues: Excluded from LBA (2025–26)
- Founded: 1964; 62 years ago
- History: Cestistica Trapani (1964–1969); Edera Trapani (1969–1981); Pallacanestro Trapani (1981–1997); Basket Trapani (1997–2011); Pallacanestro Trapani S.C. (2011–2013); C.S. Pallacanestro Trapani (2013–2023); Trapani Shark (2023–2026)
- Arena: PalaIlio
- Capacity: 4,575
- Location: Trapani, Sicily, Italy
- Team colors: Maroon and White
- Main sponsor: Sport Invest
- President: Valerio Antonini
- General manager: Valeriano D’Orta
- Ownership: Sport Invest
- Championships: 1 Serie A2
- Retired numbers: 3 (4, 12, 13)
- Website: trapanishark.it
Home	Away

Trapani Shark is an Italian basketball team that is based in Trapani, Sicily. Founded in 2023, it is the successor to Pallacanestro Trapani. The team plays its home games at Palallio.

In 2023, the team triumphed over their rivals, Blu Basket, to win the Supercoppa LNP.

== History ==
=== Origins ===
In the 1930s, Trapani's youth sports organizations, such as the F.G.C. (Fascist Youth Combat Groups from 1930 to 1937) and the G.I.L. (Italian Youth of the Lictor from 1937 to 1943), laid the groundwork for the development of basketball in the city by organizing the first teams to compete in regional championships during the fascist regime. The earliest recorded basketball game in Trapani took place in 1934, when the local F.G.C. team faced a team from Castellammare del Golfo. In June of the same year, a regional championship was held, where the Trapani team competed against peers from Catania and Agrigento.

In 1935, the F.G.C. Trapani participated in the "Palermo Tournament," possibly an early form of the Second Division, alongside teams from Sicilian cities such as Catania, Enna, Caltanissetta, Agrigento, Syracuse, Messina, and Palermo.

In 1937, the Fascist Youth Combat Groups merged into the Italian Youth of the Lictor, which, in 1938, organized the 15th Sicily Group of the GIL First Division. The Trapani team competed alongside teams from Catania, Agrigento, Enna, and Caltanissetta.

In the early 1940s, young athletes from the GIL joined the Trapani G.U.F. (Fascist University Group), which participated in Group IV of the 1941–1942 Serie B alongside G.U.F. Palermo and G.U.F. Messina. During this period, notable athletes, often versatile in multiple sports, included Umberto Saura (15 November 1915 – 12 January 2000), who excelled in track and field as a pole vaulter and played football for Juventus Trapani, alongside Alberto Corso, Gaetano Sabato (football and track and field), Antonino Ferlito, Rocco Cernigliaro, and Paolo Calafiore (track and field).

Former GIL and GUF athletes who transitioned into coaching and administration, including Bartolomeo Sorrentino, Alberto Cardella, Pino Cardella, and Osvaldo La Cavera, further developed these sporting and organizational foundations.

The post-war period saw the rise of teams driven by associational initiatives or public and independent entities promoting sports activities and championships. Libertas Trapani, active in the 1940s, participated in regional championships for admission to the 1945–46 Serie A. This team was a local branch of the post-war Libertas National Sports Center, which was established to promote sports culture.

Corda Fratres Trapani, a local branch of the Corda Fratres (International Student Federation), was revived after the war and participated in various local and regional tournaments. It later merged, under the leadership of Girolamo "Mommo" Marchello, into the Trapani Basketball Association, active until 1953, when it joined Enal Trapani.

Following a similar model to Libertas, the Enal Trapani Sports Group, later known as Virtus Enal Trapani (or Virtus Trapani Dopolavoro), emerged as a local branch of the National Workers' Assistance Agency. Under the presidency of Professor Renzo Venza and Pio Cavasino, and with the sporting direction of Leonardo Scalabrino, the team was active in the 1950s and 1960s. Virtus Enal competed in Serie C championships and one Serie B championship in 1964–65, earning promotion by defeating Concordia Agrigento 60–37 in the promotion tournament finals held in Agrigento. The team featured promising local players such as Salvatore Castelli, Dino Magaddino, and Aldo Guarnotta, among others, who later contributed to the continuity and quality of basketball in Trapani, playing for the Rosmini Basketball Association (a rival to Virtus Enal and an emerging force in local basketball) and its successor, Cestistica Trapani.

=== 1960s: Rosmini ===
In the late 1950s, the parish of Rosminian Fathers Don Mario Tomasi and Don Oreste Radaelli became a focal point for Trapani and Erice youth through sports activities such as football and basketball. The latter sport united a group of young players who, coached by Ettore Daidone, remained undefeated for about two years across southern Italy, winning three consecutive championships and reaching Serie A (the second tier of the Italian basketball pyramid from 1955 to 1965).

In the 1958–59 season, ASP Rosmini Trapani finished second behind Virtus Enal, which won the Promotion championship, ahead of CUS Palermo. This championship served as a prelude to subsequent seasons that unexpectedly propelled the yellow-green team to the top of Italian basketball.

In the 1962–63 season, ASP Rosmini Trapani competed in Serie B, reaching the final group for promotion. By defeating Salerno 65–52, the team secured promotion to Serie A-Seconda Serie with a roster of local players, including Roald and Giuseppe Vento, Nino Fodale, Ignazio Voi, Roberto Naso, Giovanni Crimi, Franco Gallo, Aldo Guarnotta, Giuseppe Ruffino, and Carlo Lungaro (future president of the Enichem Priolo women's basketball team).

Despite financial challenges, in their debut in 1963–64 Serie A-Seconda Serie, the Trapani team finished ninth (second-to-last), tied with Pall. Catanzaro, with Foggia finishing last. However, a protest by Catanzaro regarding a game played in Bari eliminated the possibility of a relegation play-off, resulting in Rosmini's relegation. This led to the dissolution of the association, which lacked a solid organizational base to continue in the championship, and some players moved to other teams, such as U.S. Palermo or Cestistica Trapani.

In December 1964, Cestistica Trapani was founded, with Francesco Calamia, a Trapani politician and multiple-time Mayor of Trapani, as president. The team inherited Rosmini's sporting title and players, some of whom were also founders of the team. The team competed in Serie B and C championships, achieving strong results in youth categories and consistently participating in national finals, especially in the early 1970s.

=== 1970s: Edera ===
1970 Italian Cup

4 October 1970
Dante Alighieri Gymnasium, Trapani
Quarterfinals
EDERA TP-LIBERTAS BR 77–78
Edera Trapani: Vento R. (12), Magaddino (2), Vento G. (38), Fodale (1), Castelli (7), Voi (14), Crapanzano (3), Piacentino (n.e.), Cernigliaro (n.e.), Naso (n.e.). Coach: -.
Libertas Brindisi: Calderari (16), Sangiorgio (2), Labate (17), Arigliano (14), Cecco (10), Dami (15), Bray (4), Destradis. Coach: -.
Fouled out: Castelli and Arigliano
Referees: Mongiovì and Morelli from Palermo.

In November 1965, Cestistica was renamed Cestistica Edera Trapani under the initiative of Antonio Montanti (a Trapani politician from the Italian Republican Party, hence the team's name), with Giovanni Denaro as president and Giuseppe Vento as vice-president. The team competed in Serie C and participated in the Italian Cup on two occasions. During the 1960s and 1970s, the Italian Cup involved interregional qualifiers, with teams from the top tier down to Serie D competing in groups.

In the 1970–71 tournament, Edera (then in Serie D) advanced past the preliminary rounds of the Southern Group (due to U.S. Palermo's withdrawal in the first round and Etna Catania's in the second) but lost by one point to Libertas Brindisi (then in Serie B) in the quarterfinals.

In the 1972 Italian Cup, the Trapani team was eliminated in the first round by Splugen Reyer Venezia, a top Serie A team at the time. Edera continued its activities, primarily in Serie C, with one relegation to Serie D in 1974, featuring players such as Salvatore "Libero" Ernandez, Paolo Mollura, and Andrea Magaddino, who later became key figures for Pallacanestro Trapani and Basket Trapani.

Meanwhile, Giuseppe Vento remained a driving force in Trapani basketball, both as a player and administrator, striving to revive and energize a club that had long languished at lower national competitive levels. He also introduced Vincenzo Garraffa to basketball.

Garraffa, a politician, laid the groundwork for a new club, Pallacanestro Trapani, particularly after a painful relegation to Serie C2 in 1981.

=== Pallacanestro Trapani (1980–1997) ===
==== Early years ====
In 1980, Edera Trapani was renamed Pallacanestro Trapani, and its colors changed from green to maroon. In 1981, Vincenzo Garraffa became president, supported by Salvatore Mazzara, Giovanni Crimi, Roald Vento, and Elio Ippaso. After relegation to Serie C2, the club underwent a technical and organizational restructuring.

In the 1981–1983 period, by signing players such as Tuscan Francesco Mannella, Luigi "Gigi" Ranieri, and Amedeo Mazza, and hiring a non-local coach, Abruzzese Emilio "Mimmo" Trivelli, the new club achieved two consecutive promotions: first to Serie C1, secured a game early by defeating Orlandina, and then to Serie B, a hard-fought promotion won in the play-off final against Virtus Ragusa 2–1 (135–130 in the first win after three overtimes, playing the final minutes four against five, and 93–81 in the second, with 24 points from Campolattano).

The maroon team spent six seasons in Serie B and later in Serie B1. In the 1983–84 season, their first in Serie B, they achieved a respectable seventh place, supported by Angelo Destasio and Giuseppe Padua (along with Mannella and Ranieri).

The following year, in 1984–85, coach Mimmo Trivelli left, and Bruno Boero took over with Massimo Cosmelli. The team finished second, tied with Sutor Montegranaro, but missed the play-offs due to unfavorable head-to-head results.

In the 1985–86 season, the maroon team again finished second, tied with Facar Pescara, but missed the promotion play-offs due to unfavorable head-to-head results, though they were admitted to Serie B1.

==== Serie B d'Eccellenza ====
In the 1986–87 Serie B d'Eccellenza, a single national group, Pallacanestro Trapani, coached by Stefano Michelini, avoided the relegation play-offs on the final day by defeating Stamura Ancona (with an outstanding Angelo Destasio) to finish ninth.

The following season, 1987–88, was tumultuous, culminating in a relegation play-off. Finishing 13th, the team faced Esperia Cagliari on 8 May at the PalaMaggiò in Caserta, winning 88–72 to retain their spot in the second tier.

The arrival of coach Gianfranco Benvenuti and general manager Valentino Renzi (former president of Legabasket) in 1988 brought a technical and managerial leap forward. The 1988–89 season was one of consolidation, with a strong fifth-place finish, integrating new players such as Davide Lot and Antonio Guzzone.

==== Serie A ====
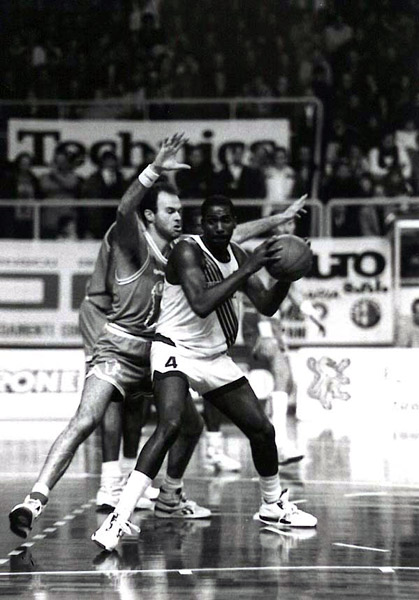
Reggie Johnson, a key figure in the promotion to Serie A1

In the 1989–90 B1 season, the arrival of sharpshooter Giuseppe Cassì and the Vini Racine team, after finishing second in the regular season behind Mens Sana Siena, achieved a long-planned goal under president Vincenzo Garraffa. They defeated Sangiorgese in the play-offs, winning 86–77 in Trapani. In Porto San Giorgio, the game was halted after Mario Piazza was hit by a lighter thrown from the crowd, with the game ending 84–81 for the home team. However, a sports tribunal awarded Trapani a 2–0 victory, securing promotion to Serie A2.

In their first 1990–91 A2 season, Birra Messina Pallacanestro Trapani aimed for survival, finishing eighth in the regular season, which unexpectedly earned them a spot in the play-offs for promotion to Serie A1. They competed in the Yellow Group, finishing tied with Filanto Forlì and Kleenex Pistoia. Based on head-to-head results, Trapani was promoted to the top tier for the first time in its history.

This "double jump" from B1 to A1 was driven by the tenacity of coach Gianfranco "Cacco" Benvenuti (who repeated his success with Reggio Calabria). The team's solid core of players, including Francesco "Ciccio" Mannella, Claudio "Bibo" Castellazzi, Mario Piazza, Giuseppe Cassì, and Davide Lot led the team to victory. The team was bolstered in A2 by two highly skilled American players: power forward Reggie Johnson, an NBA champion in 1983 with the Philadelphia 76ers, and center Bobby Lee Hurt.

For all of Sicilian sport, Pallacanestro Trapani's presence in A1 was a historic achievement. In the 1991–92 Serie A1, Giancarlo Sacco replaced Gianfranco Benvenuti, who stepped down for health reasons. With the previous season's roster retained and new additions Stefano Tosi, Wendell Alexis, and John Shasky, the Trapani team unexpectedly finished 14th, defeating Scavolini Pesaro on the final day (with a last-second shot by Tosi), avoiding the second-to-last spot and direct relegation to A2. However, relegation was only delayed, as a disappointing play-out phase ended their top-tier tenure.

Trapani remained in Serie A2 for four more seasons, sponsored by Tonno Auriga. In 1992–93, coached by Riccardo Sales, they finished 10th. In 1993–94, with Giancarlo Sacco returning to replace Ninni Gebbia, they secured 11th place. Meanwhile, President Garraffa stepped down and the remaining shareholders took over management of the club. In 1994–95, with three coaching changes, they finished 14th.

==== Financial crisis and bankruptcy ====
The following year, the club's financial crisis worsened, becoming irreversible, leading to a lackluster 1995–96 season, finishing 14th and last, resulting in direct relegation to Serie B1.

In 1997, after an unremarkable Serie B1 season, Pallacanestro Trapani failed to register for the following championship, leading to the Federal Council's revocation of its league affiliation. This marked the end of its sporting activities, followed by bankruptcy. Contributing factors included perceived geographic and sporting marginality, the significant financial burden of building the PalaGranata (three billion lire, then the only privately built sports facility in southern Italy), unfulfilled promises of public funding (especially from the Sicilian Region), poor technical and managerial decisions, and the lack of a major sponsor.

==== Pallacanestro Trapani statistics ====
(1981–1997)

- APPEARANCES
- 308 Francesco Mannella
- 298 Mario Piazza
- 284 Claudio Castellazzi
- 203 Amedeo Mazza
- 189 Marco Martin
- 176 Angelo Destasio
- 144 Stefano Tosi
- 140 Fabio Tartamella
- 129 Giuseppe Cassì
- 100 Davide Lot
- POINTS
- 3,468 Francesco Mannella
- 2,988 Claudio Castellazzi
- 2,555 Mario Piazza
- 2,156 Angelo Destasio
- 2,071 Amedeo Mazza
- 1,411 Umberto Coppari
- 1,303 Giuseppe Cassì
- 1,200 Davide Lot
- 1,098 Luigi Ranieri
- 1,005 Antonio Campolattano
- POINTS AVERAGE
- 17.28 Luigi Ranieri
- 15.50 Umberto Coppari
- 13.53 Donato Di Monte
- 13.08 Maurizio Biondi
- 12.25 Angelo Destasio
- 12.00 Davide Lot
- 11.42 Antonio Campolattano
- 11.25 Francesco Mannella
- 10.69 Francesco De Lise
- 10.52 Claudio Castellazzi
- SEASONS
- 11 Francesco Mannella
- 10 Claudio Castellazzi
- 9 Mario Piazza
- 7 Amedeo Mazza
- 7 Marco Martin
- 6 Angelo Destasio
- 5 Giovanni La Commare
- 5 Fabio Tartamella
- 5 Sergio Zucchi
- 4 Giuseppe Cassì

==== Garraffa-Dell'Utri judicial case ====
The sponsorship by Birra Messina (Dreher-Heineken) was linked to a controversy in which Vincenzo Garraffa accused Marcello Dell'Utri of alleged threats by mafia boss Vincenzo Virga in 1992, who reportedly said, "Dell'Utri sent me." The legal case concluded in May 2011 with an acquittal in the Supreme Court of Cassation. On 14 April 2009, the judges of the Fourth Court of Appeal in Milan downgraded the charge from attempted extortion to threat (under "voluntary desistance," Article 56, paragraph 3 of the Penal Code), ruling that no further action was required against Dell'Utri or Vincenzo Virga, as the charges were time-barred.

=== Restart as Associazione Basket Trapani (1997–2011) ===
In 1997, on the initiative of Alberto Montericcio, Andrea Magaddino, and Filippo Mucaria, Associazione Basket Trapani was founded, acquiring the Serie C2 title from Amatori Trapani. The following year, they acquired the title of Vis Nova Caltanissetta, competing in Serie B2 in 1999, finishing second behind Premiata Montegranaro, which defeated Trapani in the play-off final. This strong performance led to Basket Trapani being reinstated in Serie B d'Eccellenza.

In their first year in d'Eccellenza, 1999, the team saw a coaching change, with Giacomo Genovese replaced by Cantù native Gianni Lambruschi due to poor results, ultimately avoiding relegation in the play-outs against Ozzano. The following year, the founding trio dissolved, leaving Magaddino in charge. The 2000–01 season, sponsored by Banca Sant'Angelo, ended with a disappointing 13th place and another coaching change between Gianni Lambruschi and Marco Morganti. In 2001, with new coach Gianni Montemurro, the team finished sixth in the regular season, reaching the play-offs but losing in the first round to New Wash Montichiari.

For the 2002–03 season, the maroon club embarked on an ambitious recruitment campaign, signing players such as Augusto Binelli (a legend at Virtus Bologna), Giampaolo Zamberlan, and promising talent Mattia Soloperto. Coached by Rimini native Massimo Bernardi, Basket Trapani reached the play-offs, defeating Imola and Montegranaro but losing in the final to Banco di Sardegna Sassari 2–1. The following year, with the core of Virgilio-Zamberlan-Binelli retained, in the 2003–04 season, coached by new Abruzzese coach Tony Trullo, Basket Trapani lost two consecutive finals: first to Univer Vernici Castelletto Ticino and then to Tris Rieti, both 2–1.

==== In Legadue ====
The strong performances of previous seasons and the disqualification of Banca Popolare Ragusa paved the way for a reinstatement in Legadue in 2004.

For the leap to the new league, the club hired a young and promising coach, Grosseto native Luca Banchi, and in 2004–05, the team's performance, showcasing the talents of Darby, Clack, and Owens, resulted in a 10th-place finish, narrowly missing the play-offs.

In 2005, the club appointed another young coach, Luigi Gresta, but he left after less than a month due to off-court issues. He was replaced by Giancarlo Sacco, a familiar figure in local basketball, who could not reverse the team’s fortunes. Trapani was relegated at the end of a disastrous 2005–06 season, earning eight points, cycling through two coaches, and using 22 players.

==== Return to Serie B d'Eccellenza ====
In the 2006–07 season, president Andrea Magaddino chose to remain at the helm despite the previous season’s disaster, launching a three-year plan for promotion to Legadue. The plan included appointing a nationally renowned sporting director, Trapani native Giuseppe Barbara, in his first non-coaching role after serving as coach during Pallacanestro Trapani’s struggles, and a young, experienced coach, Avellino native Gianluca Tucci, well-versed in Serie B d'Eccellenza. At the end of the 2007 season, Basket Trapani finished third in the regular season and was eliminated in the play-off quarterfinals by Fulgor Basket Fidenza 2–1.

In the following season, the 2007–08 season, and still under the guidance of Gianluca Tucci, Basket Trapani finished second in the regular season and earned a spot in the playoffs. In the final against New Basket Brindisi, led by Sicilian coach Giovanni Perdichizzi, Trapani won Game 1 at PalaIlio 79–76 but lost Game 2 at PalaPentassuglia 79–74, missing promotion to Legadue by a two-point difference.

In the 2008–09 season, after an inconsistent campaign marked by a coaching change from Marco Calvani to Marcello Perazzetti, the team finished fifth, qualifying for the play-offs but losing in the quarterfinals to Robur Basket Osimo 2–1. At the end of the season, President Andrea Magaddino announced the sale of the sporting title and the club, citing economic and sporting challenges as the reason for his decision to end his long tenure.

On 16 June 2009, after twelve years, ownership passed from Andrea Magaddino to Alessandro Massinelli, an entrepreneur from Ribera. For the 2009–10 season, the team was revamped under GM Francesco Lima and new coach Giovanni Benedetto. The first season under Massinelli ended with an unexpected fifth place, qualifying for the play-offs. Despite a limited roster (with Cristiano Masper and Fabio Marcante leaving during the season), Benedetto’s team reached the play-off quarterfinals, losing to Liomatic Perugia 2–1.

==== Promotion and failed registration ====
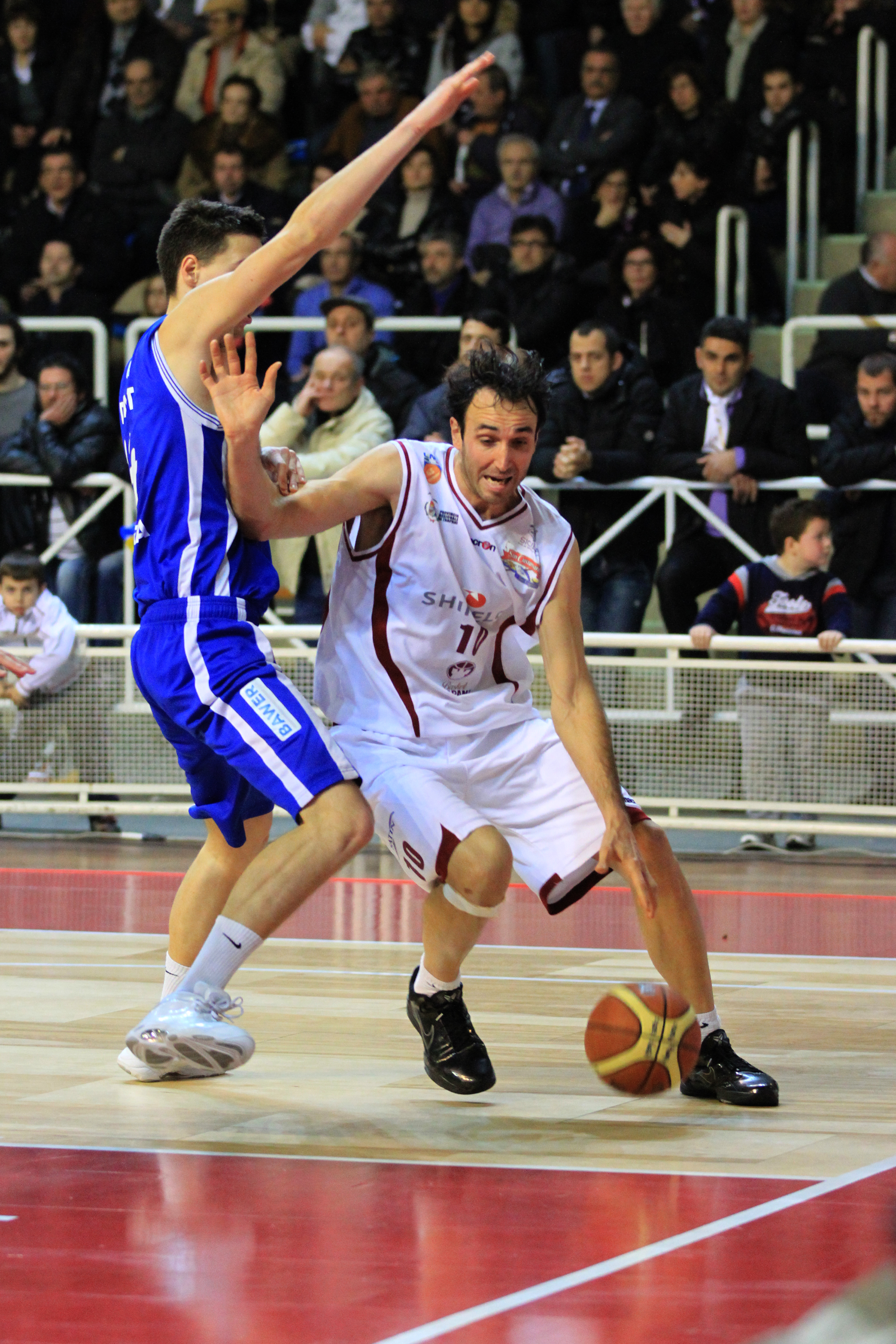
Santarossa, a key figure in the promotion to Legadue

Retaining Giovanni Benedetto as coach led to a major overhaul of the starting lineup for the 2010–11 Serie A Dilettanti season, with the addition of Francesco Guarino, Ariel Svoboda, and Luca Bisconti (key players in Barcellona’s promotion the previous year), alongside Marco Evangelisti and Walter Santarossa. Despite financial difficulties (unpaid salaries), the team remained united. As Benedetto recalled in an interview: "On December 18, the six seniors and I locked ourselves in a room and decided to move forward. Despite the difficulties, we did it. With passion. If anyone had wanted to leave, that would have been the moment. No one left. We had made a choice. We accepted all the consequences that came with it."

With a limited roster due to financial constraints, the season ended with first place in Group B and qualification for the play-offs, where Trapani defeated a resilient Sant'Antimo 3–2 in the semifinals. They faced Leonessa Brescia in the final, losing 3–0, but later secured promotion to Legadue in Game 3 of the final series against Ostuni.

However, registration for the new league faced complications: the Legadue assembly, led by president Bonamico, rejected Trapani’s registration, a decision upheld by the Italian National Olympic Committee due to incorrect financial parameters identified by the federal oversight body Comtec. The situation was further complicated by a related appeal to the TAR and the efforts of the organized fan group, Trapanesi Granata, to save the club from financial and sporting ruin.

=== Renaming to Pallacanestro Trapani S.C. (2011–2023) ===
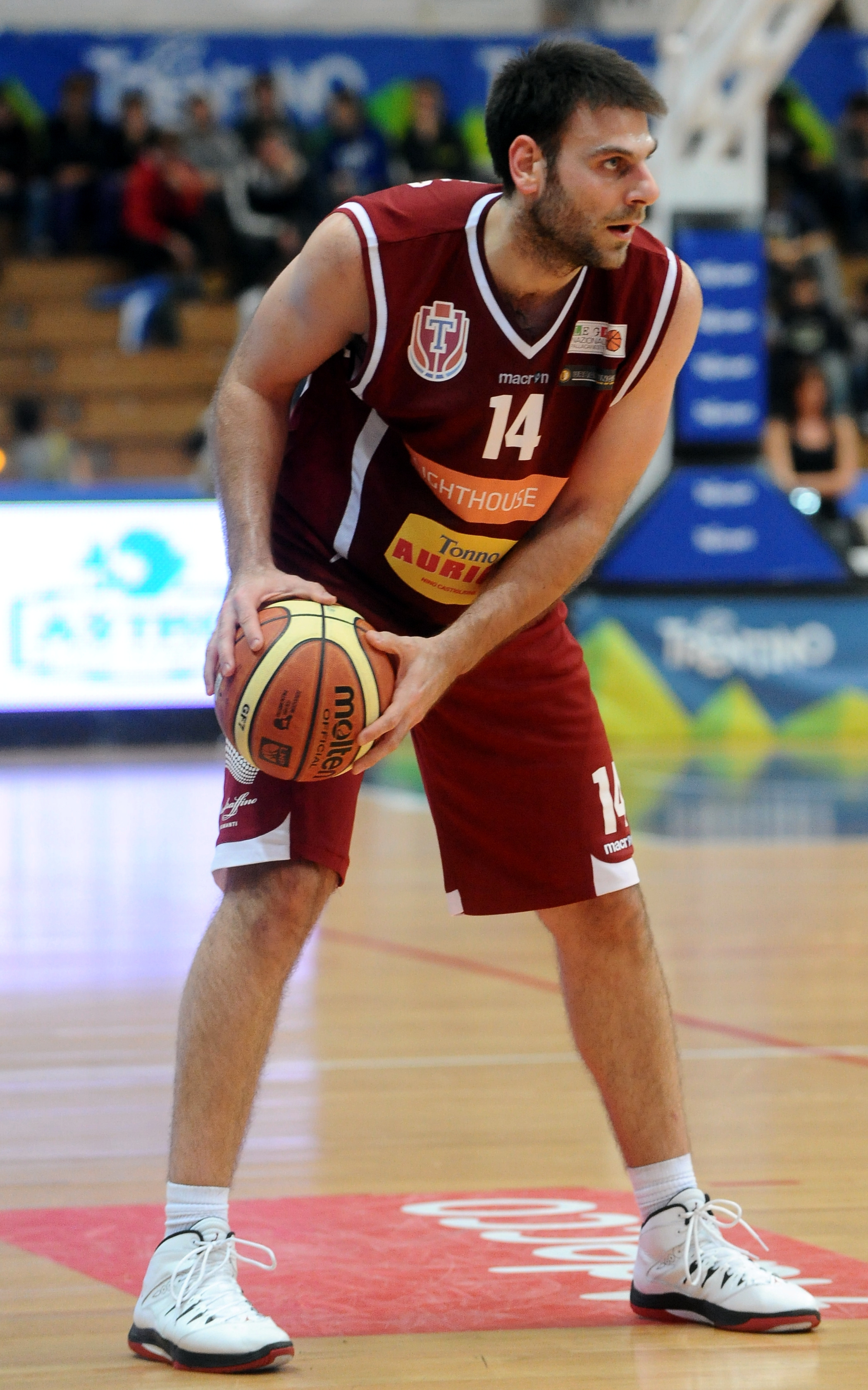
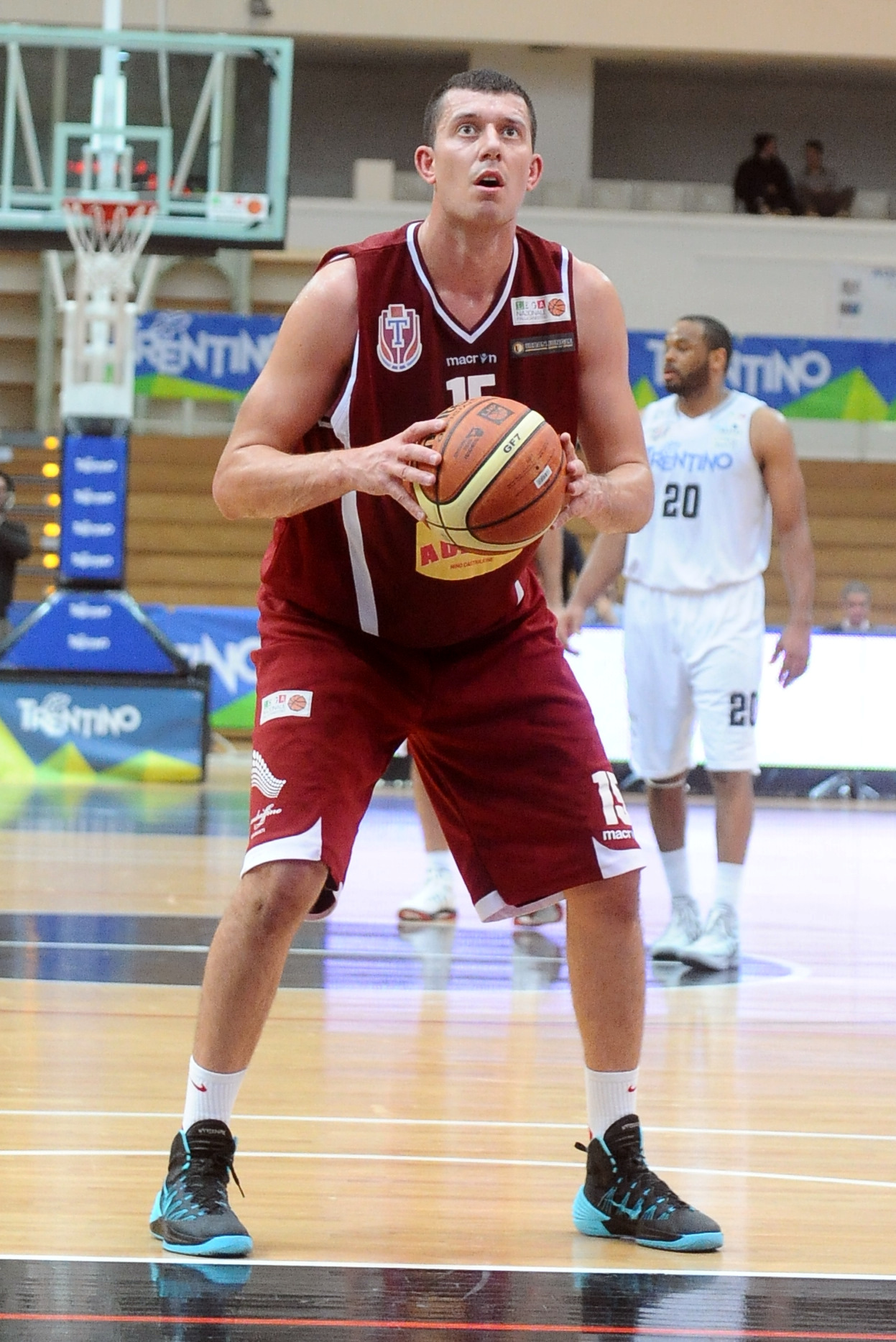
Rizzitiello and Ianes

The summer dispute concluded with a change in ownership, as the club was acquired by Trapani-born entrepreneur Pietro Basciano (with businesses in Emilia-Romagna). The Italian Basketball Federation (FIP) decided to relegate the club three divisions, resulting in its registration in the Divisione Nazionale C (formerly C Dilettanti).

Basciano withdrew the appeal to the Regional Administrative Court (TAR) and renamed the club Pallacanestro Trapani Sporting Club. The new club, led by Flavio Priulla (assistant coach in Trapani since 2001), achieved its first seasonal milestone by winning the Coppa Italia DNC, defeating Cento 67–59, with Ariel Svoboda named MVP of the final. The team also completed the DNC regular season (Group I) undefeated, a unique achievement in Italy. Subsequently, the team won the playoffs, defeating Pol. Acireale in the final (the eighth final in its short history), earning promotion to Divisione Nazionale B.

For the fourth national division, the Trapani club assembled a strong roster with the acquisition of Luca Ianes and Nelson Rizzitiello in an attempt to win the championship immediately and reach what would later be called LegaDue Silver (formerly Divisione Nazionale A). Finishing third in the regular season and being eliminated in the playoff semifinals by Roseto resulted in a season below expectations, marked by sporting disappointments. At the end-of-season press conference, president Pietro Basciano announced, "We are working to avoid playing another DNB championship. We have been offered four titles, two of Divisione Nazionale A Gold and two of Legadue Silver", indicating the possibility of advancing to the second or third national championship.

==== Return to Legadue ====
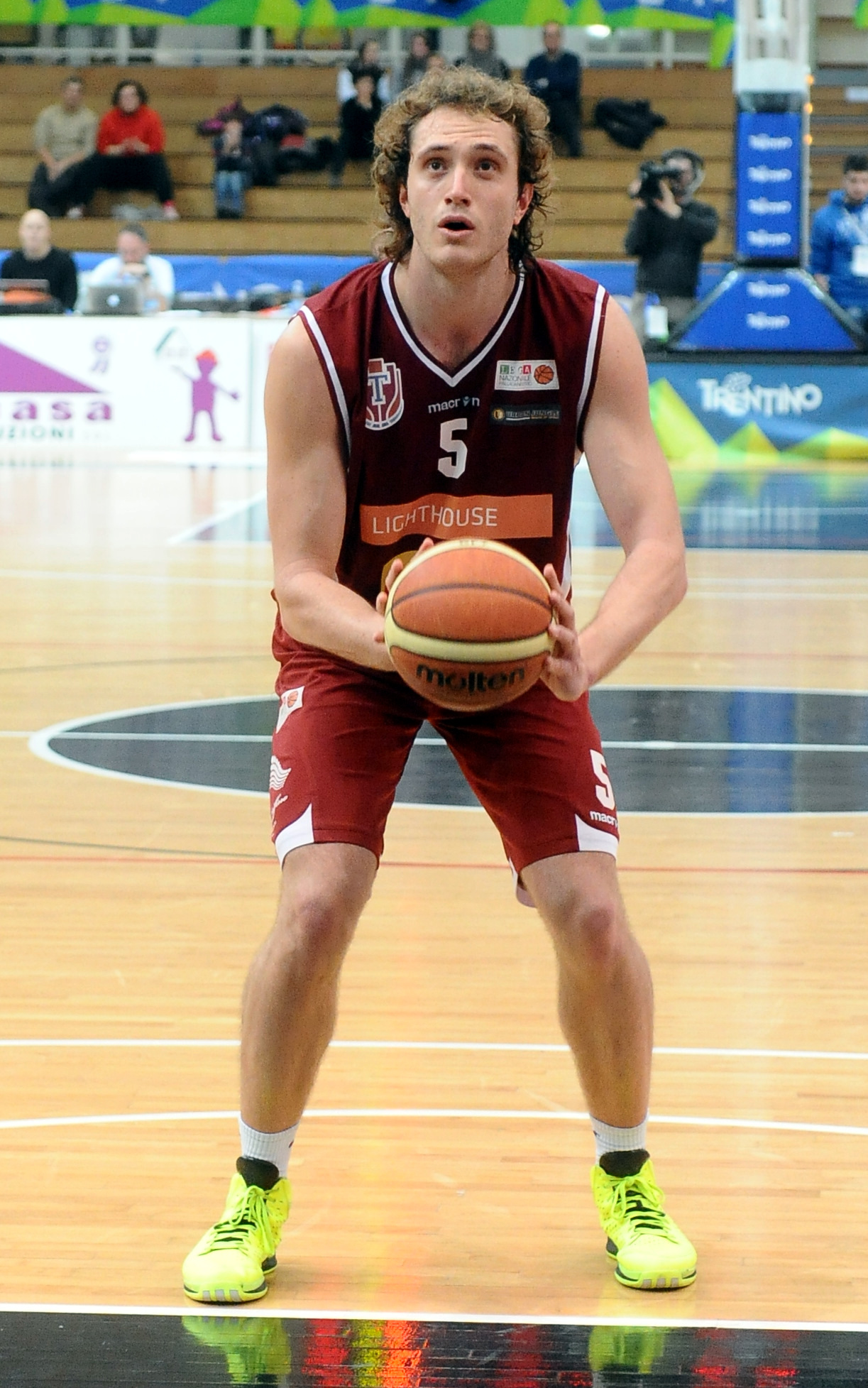
Andrea Renzi

After various vicissitudes, on 2 July 2013, Pallacanestro Trapani exchanged its sporting title with Scafati Basket, moving from DNB to the new DNA Gold (formerly Legadue). Following the promotion, the club appointed Lino Lardo as the new head coach, who led the team to a comfortable mid-table finish, narrowly missing the playoffs. The following year began with the appointment of General Manager Julio Trovato from Turin and a largely unchanged roster (Renzi-Baldassarre-Ferrero-Bossi), but the team failed to reach the playoffs, performing well below expectations.

The disappointing two-year period in terms of results (2013–14: 11th in Divisione Nazionale A Gold; 2014–15: 10th in Serie A2 Gold) led to a coaching change with the arrival of Ugo Ducarello (previously assistant coach to Perdichizzi, Pozzecco, and Sacchetti), who succeeded Lardo for the 2015–16 Serie A2 season, which ended with elimination in the playoff round of 16 against Brescia. In the following season, the team finished eighth in the West Group of Serie A2, qualifying for the playoffs but losing 3–0 to Treviso in the round of 16. The next season was inconsistent: five consecutive wins propelled the team to second place (qualifying for the Coppa Italia), but five subsequent losses led to the dismissal of head coach Ugo Ducarello, who was replaced by his assistant Daniele Parente. Finishing sixth, the team qualified for the playoffs but was eliminated 3–1 in the round of 16 by Treviso.

The reappointment of the coach and a significant roster overhaul led the team to a ninth-place finish and consecutive playoff qualification, where they were eliminated 3–2 in the round of 16 by Treviso. The COVID-19 pandemic led to the suspension of the 2019–20 season with the team in sixth place; the championship was not resumed and was officially canceled. The pandemic also affected the 2020–21 season (no spectators and a modified schedule), which ended with a 13th-place finish and elimination in the playoff quarterfinals against APU Udine. With the departure of Andrea Renzi and a partial roster renewal, the ninth consecutive season in the second tier was hampered by numerous injuries, resulting in a ninth-place finish and exclusion from the playoff zone.

The problems from the last season continued into the next championship, which was marked by a big change to the team roster halfway through the season (including the return of Andrea Renzi and the addition of Stumbris), concluding with a 17th-place finish (8th in the regular season and 5th in the white group) and exclusion from the playoff zone.

The end of the previous season coincided with president Pietro Basciano’s intention to sell the club to Valerio Antonini, a Roman entrepreneur in the cereal sector, already involved in Trapani through the acquisition of majority shares in the city’s football team, Trapani. The negotiations, initially promising, were halted.

=== Reestablishment as Trapani Shark (2023–present) ===
Unconvinced by the club’s financial situation, Antonini, through his company Sport Invest, registered a new sports association named Trapani Shark, which acquired the Serie A2 sporting title from Stella Azzurra Roma. At the start of the season, the Sicilian team confirmed Daniele Parente as head coach and Alex Latini as second assistant, adding Daniele Quilici as first assistant. The season began with the 2023 Supercoppa LNP tournament, where the team won its first trophy under Antonini’s management, defeating Treviglio 83–67 in the final.

The regular season was marked by a new all-time record for consecutive wins in Serie A2 (since the 2013–14 season), with the team achieving a 14-game winning streak after a home victory against Treviglio. This streak extended to 17 consecutive wins, ending with a loss to Cividale in the first game of the "clock phase".

In the Coppa Italia LNP, the Trapani team was defeated in the semifinals by Fortitudo Bologna, a loss that led to the dismissal of head coach Daniele Parente, who was replaced by Andrea Diana.

The "clock phase" concluded with a first-place finish, granting access to the playoffs, where the team defeated Piacenza 3–1 in the quarterfinals, Verona 3–0 in the semifinals, and Fortitudo Bologna 3–1 in the final, securing promotion to Serie A and the title of Italian Amateur Champion.

==== Return to Serie A ====
For the return to Serie A after 32 years, the Trapani management opted to change the coaching staff, hiring experienced Croatian coach Jasmin Repeša, with Andrea Diana agreeing to stay as assistant coach. The regular season concluded with a second-place finish and qualification for the playoffs, where the team defeated Pallacanestro Reggiana in the quarterfinals but was defeated by Pallacanestro Brescia in the semifinals. During the season, the team was also eliminated in the quarterfinals of the Coppa Italia by Pallacanestro Trieste.

For the following 2025–26 LBA season, the club would face a four-point deduction in the standings, due to administrative irregularities.

=== 2025–26 exclusion ===
Due to financial problems, most of Trapani's players were not being paid in time, and decided not to play. This led to Trapani arriving at official Lega Basket Serie A games with a depleted roster, and playing parts of games with not enough players on court. In January 2026, Trapani Shark was excluded from the 2025–26 LBA season by the National Sports Judge of the Italian Basketball Federation, with all their matches played prior to that date also cancelled. Trapani were fined €600,000 and the club president was suspended for three months as part of the ruling.

== Timeline ==
Timeline of Trapani Shark
- 1950s · ASP Rosmini begins youth sports activities.
- 1956–57 · in the Provincial Cadet Championship.
- 1957–58 · in Promozione Provinciale.
- 1958–59 · 2nd in Promozione Provinciale.
- 1959–60 · 1st in Provincial Junior Championship, reaches the Regional Junior Championship finals.

- 1960–61 · in Promozione Provinciale, withdraws during the season.
- 1961–62 · 1st in Promozione Provinciale, wins Western Sicily Regional Finals, promoted to Serie B.
- 1962–63 · 1st in Western Sicily group of Serie B, 1st in Final Group (Group D), promoted to Serie A.
- 1963–64 · 9th in Group D of Serie A Seconda Serie, relegated to Serie B.
- 1964 · Foundation of Cestistica Trapani, which acquires Rosmini’s title.
- 1964–65 · 2nd in Western Sicilian group of Serie B.
- 1965 · Becomes Cestistica Edera Trapani.
- 1965–66 · 5th in Group I of Serie C.
- 1966–67 · in Group F of Serie C, withdraws during the season.
- 1967–68 · 1st in Western Sicily Promozione, promoted to Serie D.
- 1968–69 · 3rd in Group H of Serie D.
- 1969–70 · 4th in Group H of Serie D.

- 1970–71 · 3rd in Group H of Serie D.

Fourth round of Coppa Italia.

- 1971–72 · 1st in Group N of Serie D, promoted to Serie C.

First round of Coppa Italia.

- 1972–73 · 7th in Group F of Serie C.
- 1973–74 · 12th in Group F of Serie C, relegated to Serie D.
- 1974–75 · 1st in Serie D First Phase, 2nd in Second Phase.
- 1975–76 · 1st in Serie D, promoted to Serie C. 2nd in Group B.
- 1976–77 · 6th in Serie C.
- 1977–78 · 2nd in Group M of Serie C, 2nd in Group B. Loses promotion playoff.
- 1978–79 · 3rd in Serie C1, 8th in Group B.
- 1979–80 · 3rd in Serie C1, 6th in Group B.

- 1980 · Becomes Pallacanestro Trapani.
- 1980–81 · 7th in Serie C1, relegated to Serie C2.
- 1981–82 · 2nd in Serie C2, promoted to Serie C1.
- 1982–83 · 2nd in Serie C1, wins promotion playoff, promoted to Serie B.
- 1983–84 · 7th in Group B of Serie B.
- 1984–85 · 3rd in Group B of Serie B.
- 1985–86 · 3rd in Group B of Serie B.
- 1986–87 · 10th in Serie B d'Eccellenza.
- 1987–88 · 13th in Serie B d'Eccellenza, wins relegation playoff.
- 1988–89 · 5th in Serie B d'Eccellenza.
- 1989–90 · 2nd in Serie B d'Eccellenza, wins promotion playoffs, promoted to Serie A2.

- 1990–91 · 8th in Serie A2, 1st in Yellow Group of Serie A1 play-outs, promoted to Serie A1.

Round of 32 in Coppa Italia.

- 1991–92 · 14th in Serie A1, 5th in Yellow Group of play-outs, relegated to Serie A2.

Round of 16 in Coppa Italia.

- 1992–93 · 10th in Serie A2, 5th in Yellow Group of Serie A1 play-outs.

Round of 32 in Coppa Italia.

- 1993–94 · 11th in Serie A2.

Round of 16 in Coppa Italia.

- 1994–95 · 14th in Serie A2.

Round of 32 in Coppa Italia.

- 1995–96 · 14th in Serie A2, relegated to Serie B d'Eccellenza.

Round of 32 in Coppa Italia.

- 1996–97 · 7th in Group B of Serie B d'Eccellenza, 2nd in Group B relegation, does not register for the following season due to bankruptcy.
- 1997 · Club reestablished as Associazione Basket Trapani. Acquires the sporting title of Amatori Trapani, admitted to Serie C2.
- 1997–98 · in Group Q of Serie C2.
- 1998 · Acquires the sporting title of Vis Nova Caltanissetta, admitted to Serie B2.
- 1998–99 · 2nd in Serie B2, reaches promotion playoff final, reinstated to Serie B d'Eccellenza.
- 1999–2000 · 13th in Group B of Serie B d'Eccellenza, wins play-outs.

in Coppa Italia LNP.

- 2000–01 · 12th in Group B of Serie B d'Eccellenza.

Round of 32 in Coppa Italia LNP.

- 2001–02 · 6th in Group B of Serie B d'Eccellenza, quarterfinals of promotion playoffs.

Round of 32 in Coppa Italia LNP.

- 2002–03 · 4th in Group A of Serie B d'Eccellenza, promotion playoff final.
- 2003–04 · 2nd in Group B of Serie B d'Eccellenza, promotion playoff final, loses promotion playoff, reinstated to Legadue.
- 2004–05 · 10th in Legadue.
- 2005–06 · 16th in Legadue, relegated to Serie B d'Eccellenza.
- 2006–07 · 3rd in Group B of Serie B d'Eccellenza, quarterfinals of promotion playoffs.

Qualifying round of Coppa Italia LNP.

- 2007–08 · 2nd in Group B of Serie B d'Eccellenza, promotion playoff final.

Final of Coppa Italia LNP.

- 2008–09 · 5th in Group B of Serie A Dilettanti, quarterfinals of promotion playoffs.
- 2009–10 · 5th in Group B of Serie A Dilettanti, quarterfinals of promotion playoffs.

Summer Cup of Coppa Italia LNP.

- 2010–11 · 1st in Group B of Serie A Dilettanti, wins promotion playoffs, promoted to Legadue, excluded from the following season due to financial irregularities.

2nd qualifying group of Coppa Italia LNP.

- 2011 · Becomes Pallacanestro Trapani Sporting Club, admitted to Divisione Nazionale C.
- 2011–12 · 1st in Group I of Divisione Nazionale C, wins promotion playoffs, promoted to Divisione Nazionale B.

Wins the Coppa Italia LNP Divisione Nazionale C (1st title).

- 2012–13 · 3rd in Group C of Divisione Nazionale B, promotion playoff semifinals.
- 2013 · Becomes Club Sportivo Pallacanestro Trapani, acquires the sporting title of Scafati Basket, admitted to Divisione Nazionale A Gold.
- 2013–14 · 11th in Divisione Nazionale A Gold.
- 2014–15 · 10th in Gold Group of Serie A2.
- 2015–16 · 7th in West Group of Serie A2, promotion playoff round of 16.
- 2016–17 · 8th in West Group of Serie A2, promotion playoff round of 16.
- 2017–18 · 6th in West Group of Serie A2, promotion playoff round of 16.

Quarterfinals of Coppa Italia LNP.

- 2018–19 · 9th in West Group of Serie A2, promotion playoff round of 16.
- 2019–20 · 6th in West Group of Serie A2.

Quarterfinals of Supercoppa LNP.

- 2020–21 · 7th in Green Group of Serie A2, 1st in Blue Group of the "clock phase", promotion playoff quarterfinals.

Group stage of Supercoppa LNP.

- 2021–22 · 9th in Green Group of Serie A2.

Group stage of Supercoppa LNP.

- 2022–23 · 8th in Green Group of Serie A2, 5th in White Group of Second Phase.

Quarterfinals of Supercoppa LNP.

- 2023 · Pallacanestro Trapani does not register for the following championship. Transfers sporting title to Trapani Shark.
- 2023–24 · 1st in Green Group of Serie A2, wins Silver bracket promotion playoffs, promoted to Serie A, Italian Amateur Champion (1st title).

Wins the Supercoppa LNP (1st title).
Semifinals of Coppa Italia LNP.

- 2024–25 · 2nd in Serie A, championship playoff semifinals.

Quarterfinals of Coppa Italia.

- 2025–26 · in Serie A.

in Basketball Champions League.

== Timeline of Trapani basketball teams ==
1934
1937
1944
1945
1950
1953
1957
1958
1964
1965
1980
1997
2011
2023

FGC Trapani (1934-37)
GIL Trapani (1937-43)
Corda Fratres Trapani (1944-50)
Libertas Trapani (1945-??)
AS Pall. Trapani (1950-53)
G.S. Enal Trapani (1953-58)
ASP Rosmini Trapani (1957-64)
Virtus Enal Trapani (1958-66)
Cestistica Trapani (1964-65)
Cestistica Edera Trapani (1965-80)
Pallacanestro Trapani (1980-97)
Basket Trapani (1997-2011)
Pallacanestro Trapani (2011-23)
Trapani Shark (2023-present)

== Colors and symbols ==
=== Colors ===
The Trapani Shark uniforms are maroon with white trim for away games, while for home games, the colors are reversed.

The maroon color is commonly used by Trapani’s major sports clubs and derives from the maroon blazon of the city’s coat of arms. Specifically in basketball, maroon was chosen by the original Pallacanestro Trapani (1981–1997 and 2011–2023), Basket Trapani (1997–2011), and the current club. Previously, Trapani’s main teams opted for green: Rosmini Trapani (1957–1964) and Edera Trapani (1969–1981) before transforming into Pallacanestro Trapani. In 2023, Trapani Shark chose a black jersey, returning to maroon the following year.

Below is a selection of historical Trapani basketball uniforms:

(1960s)	(1977–79)	(1979–81)	(1981–83)	(1983–84)	Gimer (1984–86)	Sergio Tacchini (*) (1986–87)	Sergio Tacchini (1987–88)

Kronos (1988–90)	Kronos (1990–91)	Kronos (1991–92)	Kronos (1992–93)	Kronos (1993–95)	Kronos (1995–96)	Champion (1996–97)	(1998–99)

Reebok (1999–01)	HM (2001–02)	Macron (2002–03)	Macron (2003–05)	Loud (2005–06)	Macron (2006–08)	Aries (2008–09)	Athletes (2009)

Macron (2009–11)	Macron (2011–12)	Athletes (2012–13)	Macron (2013–14)	Spalding (2014–15)	Spalding (2015–16)	EYE Sport (2016–17)	EYE Sport (2017–18)

EYE Sport (2018–19)	Erreà/TAG (2019–2020)	Erreà/TAG (2020–2021)	Erreà/TAG (2021–2022)	Erreà/TAG (2022–2023)	Macron (2023–2024)	Adidas (2024–2025)

- Third/Special

EYE Sport (2018)

(*) For the 1986 championship, Pallacanestro Trapani chose the sponsor’s colors

== Official symbols ==
=== Emblem ===
The initial Pallacanestro Trapani chose as its logo a graphic integration of the five towers, a symbol of the city, embedded within a maroon-colored basketball, with the club's name displayed below.

Subsequently, with the establishment of Basket Trapani in 1997, Andrea Magaddino's management selected a dolphin as the club's symbol, holding a basketball while leaping through a hoop (representing the basketball rim), set against a maroon-colored triangle background featuring the club's name in two distinct calligraphic fonts. The Massinelli management commissioned Mino Poma, a Trapani-based graphic designer and club executive, to undertake a radical redesign of the logo, choosing the tower (drawn from the city’s coat of arms) as the main symbol, prominently featured within a maroon-colored basketball, while retaining the original calligraphic style of the club’s name.

In 2011, following a change in ownership and the renaming of the club from Basket Trapani to Pallacanestro Trapani, a new logo was introduced. It featured a blue "T" at the center of a graphically deconstructed basketball, symbolizing the city’s five towers at the top and a stylized scythe at the bottom. The logo’s layout was completed with the club’s name positioned at the bottom right, using two different text styles (bold and regular).

With the club’s re-establishment, the current emblem takes the form of a "shield" and incorporates the historical symbols of Trapani’s coat of arms: the five towers and the scythe. The towers and scythe, set above waves representing the sea, are displayed on a maroon background, with the club’s name featured at the top.

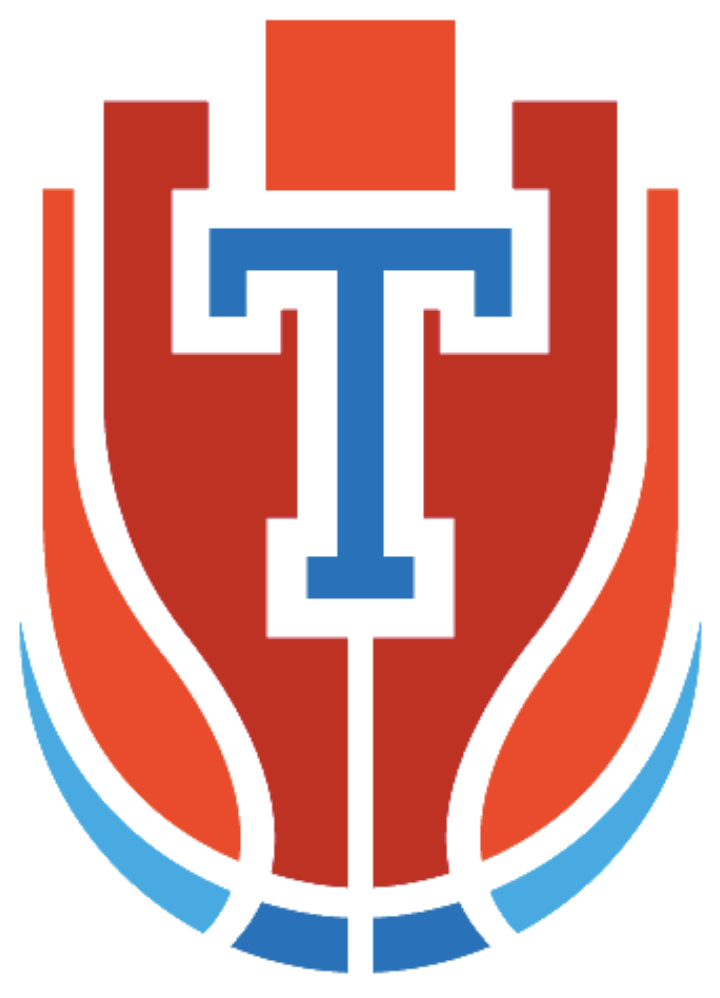
Logo used from 2011 to 2018.

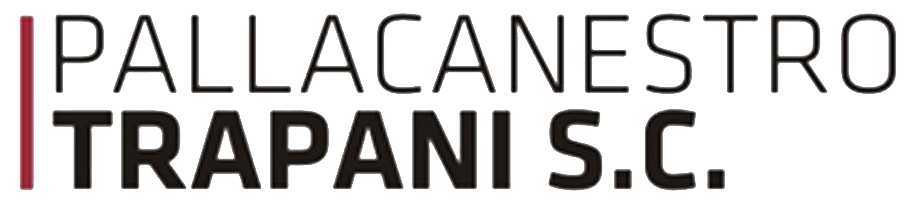
Wordmark used from 2011 to 2018.

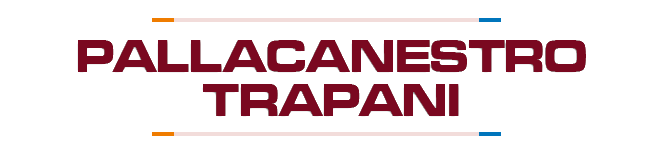
Wordmark used from 2018 to 2023.

Trapani Shark logo (2023–present)

Trapani Shark alternative logo (2024–present)

=== Mascot ===
Following the sponsorship by Tonno Auriga from the Trapani-based company "Nino Castiglione" in 2013, the official mascot, Aurighetto, was introduced, named in honor of the company. Aurighetto is a blue tuna wearing a traditional white sailor’s cap and the team’s uniform.

With the renaming to Trapani Shark in 2023, a new mascot was introduced: "Maverick," a blue shark wearing a maroon jersey featuring the city’s five towers and scythe in gold at the center.

== Sponsors ==
Over the years, the commercial "naming" of basketball in Trapani (the sponsor) has primarily been associated with Sicilian companies or those connected to Sicily. These include the Mazara-based Pasta Poiatti, Olio Caruso, Vini Racine, Birra Messina, and Tonno Auriga. During its year in Serie A1, the Trapani club lacked a sponsor, and president Vincenzo Garraffa opted for a symbolic self-sponsorship with an anti-mafia message, using the slogan "L'Altra Sicilia" (The Other Sicily). The Magaddino management maintained a preference for local banking institutions, while the Basciano presidency linked the team’s naming to the Lighthouse Group, where he serves as CEO. With the ownership transition to Antonini, the main sponsors reflect the entrepreneurial ventures of the new management, focusing on commodity trading in the agricultural sector and sports investment management.

=== Timeline of technical sponsors ===
- 1964–1984: None
- 1984–1986: Gimer
- 1986–1988: Sergio Tacchini
- 1988–1996: Kronos
- 1996–1997: Champion
- 1997–1999: Unknown
- 1999–2001: Reebok
- 2001–2002: HM
- 2002–2005: Macron
- 2005–2006: Loud
- 2006–2008: Macron
- 2008–2009: Aries
- 2009: Athletes
- 2009–2012: Macron
- 2012–2013: Athletes
- 2013–2014: Macron
- 2014–2016: Spalding
- 2016–2019: EYE Sport
- 2019–2023: Erreà
- 2023–2024: Macron
- 2024–2025: Adidas
- 2025–present: Macron

=== Timeline of official sponsors ===
- 1964–1970: None
- 1970–1971: Issa
- 1971–1977: None
- 1977–1978: AS Arredostil
- 1978–1983: None
- 1983–1986: Pasta Poiatti
- 1986–1987: Olio Caruso, Plubello
- 1987–1988: Olio Caruso, Mar Alimentari
- 1988–1989: Vini Racine
- 1989–1990: Vini Racine, Marciante
- 1990–1991: Birra Messina, Province of Trapani
- 1991–1992: L'Altra Sicilia, Province of Trapani
- 1992–1993: Tonno Auriga, Pasta Poiatti, Province of Trapani
- 1993–1994: Tonno Auriga, Province of Trapani
- 1994–1996: Tonno Auriga
- 1996–1997: City of Trapani
- 1997–1998: Enopolio
- 1998–1999: Banca del Popolo Trapani
- 1999–2001: Banca Popolare Sant'Angelo
- 2001–2002: Satin, Hobby Model
- 2002–2003: Satin, N.O.V.A.R
- 2003–2004: INA Assitalia, Hobby Model
- 2004–2009: Banca Nuova, Natural Province of Trapani
- 2009: Natural Province of Trapani
- 2009–2011: Shinelco
- 2011–2012: Gestamp Solar, Lighthouse
- 2012–2013: Lighthouse
- 2013–2014: Lighthouse, Tonno Auriga
- 2014–2015: Lighthouse
- 2015–2016: Lighthouse, Conad, Acqua Pradis
- 2016–2017: Lighthouse, Conte del Tellaro
- 2017–2018: Lighthouse, 2B Control, Conad, On-Off, Campione, Kia-Automondo, Caffè Ligny
- 2018–2019: 2B Control, Agesp, Conad, On-Off, Tonno Auriga, 210 Grammi, LavoroPiù, Euforbia, Agate Trasporti, Siciliauto
- 2019–2020: 2B Control, Conad, LavoroPiù, Kia-Automondo
- 2020–2021: 2B Control, Agesp, Etaga, Kia-Automondo
- 2021–2022: 2B Control, Agesp, Conad, Liberty Lines
- 2022–2023: 2B Control, Agesp, Conad, Buffa, Tonno Auriga
- 2023–2024: Sport Invest, Quanton Commodities Ltd
- 2024–present: Sport Invest, Q Trade House, A29 Energy to Build, L.T. Costruzioni, GDM Di Maria

== Home arenas ==
The home arena of Trapani Shark is the municipally owned sports hall named PalaIlio, inaugurated in 1991, with a current capacity of 4,490 spectators.

=== Previous arenas ===
The facilities that previously hosted basketball games for Trapani teams include:

- "Degli Spalti" gymnasium and field from the 1930s to the 1960s. The earliest sports activities took place in an area in front of the city’s ancient walls, near the bastion known as "Impossibile," which defined one of its boundaries. The primary activity was football, interspersed with other sports such as athletics and basketball. Teams from the fascist youth organizations (FGC, GIL, and GUF), as well as Libertas Trapani and Enal Trapani, played their matches there.
- "Antonio Rosmini" gymnasium, "ex GIL" field, and "Cappuccini" gymnasium were primarily used in the 1960s and are still in existence.
- "Dante Alighieri" gymnasium from 1968 to 1982 (capacity: 300 spectators). This gymnasium, named after the promenade where it is located, marked the beginning of Trapani’s basketball activities in the 1960s. In 1983, Pallacanestro Trapani achieved promotion to Serie C1 and played a friendly match against Indesit Caserta, featuring Oscar Schmidt.
- "Tenente Alberti" gymnasium from 1982 to 1986 (capacity: 800 spectators). The gymnasium was inaugurated on 31 October 1982 with a match between Pallacanestro Trapani and MMP Palermo. With the promotion to Serie B d’Eccellenza, the "Via Tenente Alberti" gymnasium failed to meet the league’s safety regulations, leading to home games being played in Marsala.
- "Fortunato Bellina" sports hall (Marsala) for the 1986–1987 season (capacity: 600 spectators).
- "Palagranata" sports hall from 1987 to 1997 (capacity: 3,800 spectators). This privately owned facility, belonging to the club, hosted the Serie A1 championship. The first game at Palagranata was played on 29 November 1987 against Inalca Modena. A match of the Italian men’s national team was also held there.
- "PalaTreSanti" sports hall (Alcamo) in 2009 (capacity: 800 spectators). It was used during the first half of the 2009–2010 season due to safety upgrades at PalaIlio in Trapani.

== Current roster ==
Trapani Sharks roster
Players	Coaches
Pos. / No. / Nat. / Name / Ht. / Wt. / Age	Head coach: Vacant; Legend: (C) Team captain; Injured; Roster; Updated: 19 January 2026

=== Depth chart ===
Pos.	Starting 5	Bench
C
PF
SF
SG
PG

=== Technical staff ===
Player development coach: (United States) (Spain) Darryl Middleton
Head of Performance:
Team Manager: (Netherlands) Sebastiaan Ogliari
Athletic Trainer: (Italy) Salvatore Sorrentino
Head of Medical Area: (Italy) Claudio Fici
Team Doctor: (Italy) Salvo De Caro
Sports Physician: (Italy) Francesco Saluto
First Physiotherapist: (Italy) Marco Madau
Second Physiotherapist: (Italy) Simone Di Vita
Osteopath: (Italy) Pino Giliberto

== Statistics ==
=== League participation ===
Level	Division	Participations	Debut	Last season	Total
1st	Serie A1	1	1991–1992		3
1st	Serie A	2	2024–2025	2025–2026 (excluded)	3
2nd	Legadue	2	2004–2005	2005–2006	18
2nd	DNA Gold	1	2013–2014		18
2nd	Serie A2	15	1990–1991	2023–2024	18
3rd	Serie C	3	1965–1966	1973–1974	22
3rd	Serie B	4	1964–1965	1985–1986	22
3rd	Serie B d'Eccellenza	12	1986–1987	2007–2008	22
3rd	Serie A Dilettanti	3	2008–2009	2010–2011	22
4th	Serie D	6	1967–1968	1974–1975	15
4th	Serie C	3	1975–1976	1977–1978	15
4th	Serie C1	4	1978–1979	1982–1983	15
4th	Serie B2	1	1998–1999		15
4th	Divisione Nazionale B	1	2012–2013		15
5th	Serie C2	1	1981–1982		2
5th	Divisione Nazionale C	1	2011–2012		2
6th	Serie C2	1	1997–1998		1

=== National cup participation ===
Level	Category	Participations	Debut	Last season
1st	Coppa Italia	9	1970–1971	2025
2nd	Coppa Italia LNP	9	1999–2000	2024
2nd	Supercoppa LNP	5	2019	2023
5th	Coppa Italia LNP - Div. C	1	2011–2012	

=== European cup participation ===
Level	Category	Participations	Debut	Last season
3rd	Basketball Champions League	1	2025–2026	

=== Team statistics ===
- Statistics updated as of 12 June 2025

		Regular season statistics					Playoff statistics					Playout statistics				
Category	C. S.	G	W	L	PS	PC	G	W	L	PS	PC	G	W	L	PS	PC
Serie C2	1997–98*	-	-	-	-	-	-	-	-	-	-	-	-	-	-	-
Serie B2	1998–99	26	18	8	2107	1926	8	5	3	591	591	-	-	-	-	-
Serie B d'Ecc.	1999–00	26	10	16	1788	1868	-	-	-	-	-	5	3	2	341	328
Serie B d'Ecc.	2000–01	26	12	14	2054	2119	-	-	-	-	-	-	-	-	-	-
Serie B d'Ecc.	2001–02	26	14	12	2022	2023	3	1	2	224	238	-	-	-	-	-
Serie B d'Ecc.	2002–03	30	19	11	2253	2150	8	5	3	713	743	-	-	-	-	-
Serie B d'Ecc.	2003–04	30	22	8	2401	2183	10	6	4	761	738	-	-	-	-	-
Legadue	2004–05	30	13	17	2445	2469	-	-	-	-	-	-	-	-	-	-
Legadue	2005–06	30	4	26	2405	2650	-	-	-	-	-	-	-	-	-	-
Serie B d'Ecc.	2006–07	30	19	11	2390	2292	3	1	2	242	250	-	-	-	-	-
Serie B d'Ecc.	2007–08	26	18	8	2128	1956	9	7	2	711	661	-	-	-	-	-
Serie A dil.	2008–09	26	13	13	2011	2008	3	1	2	239	239	-	-	-	-	-
Serie A dil.	2009–10	28	17	11	2035	1996	3	1	2	199	237	-	-	-	-	-
Serie A dil.	2010–11	30	22	8	2263	2158	11	6	5	812	806	-	-	-	-	-
DNC	2011–12	30	30	0	2772	1727	6	6	0	497	353	-	-	-	-	-
DNB	2012–13	30	23	7	2269	2040	5	3	2	343	323	-	-	-	-	-
DNA Gold	2013–14	30	14	16	2315	2363	-	-	-	-	-	-	-	-	-	-
Serie A2 Gold	2014–15	26	11	15	1936	1978	-	-	-	-	-	-	-	-	-	-
Serie A2	2015–16	30	16	14	2521	2406	5	2	3	406	410	-	-	-	-	-
Serie A2	2016–17	30	15	15	2369	2380	3	0	3	203	235	-	-	-	-	-
Serie A2	2017–18	30	15	15	2354	2355	4	1	3	331	362	-	-	-	-	-
Serie A2	2018–19	28	14	14	2393	2365	5	2	3	362	418	-	-	-	-	-
Serie A2	2019–20*	25	14	11	1826	1779	-	-	-	-	-	-	-	-	-	-
Serie A2	2020–21	32	17	15	2468	2525	4	1	3	368	283	-	-	-	-	-
Serie A2	2021–22	30	14	16	2227	2354	-	-	-	-	-	-	-	-	-	-
Serie A2	2022–23	30	11	19	2081	2282	-	-	-	-	-	-	-	-	-	-
Serie A2	2023–24	32	29	3	2809	2447	11	9	2	874	769	-	-	-	-	-
Serie A	2024–25	30	22	8	2838	2556	6	3	3	527	516	-	-	-	-	-
Total		752	432	320	59654	57576	107	60	47	8303	8172	5	3	2	341	328

- * The 1997–1998 and 2019–2020 competitive seasons are not included in the totals.

== Season by season ==
Note: Statistics are correct as of June 5, 2025.

Season	Tier	League	Pos.	W	L	Postseason	W	L	Italian Cup	Ref.
1958–59	6	Prima Divisione	2nd			no Playoff			no Cup	
1959–60	6	Prima Divisione	1st			Promoted			no Cup	
1960–61	5	Promozione	1st			Promoted			no Cup	
1961–62	4	Serie C	1st			Promoted			no Cup	
1962–63	3	Serie B	1st	8	0	Promoted ^{Playoff}	6	2	no Cup	
1963–64	2	Serie A	9th	4	14	Relegated	–	–	no Cup	
1964–65	3	Serie B	?	?	?	no Playoff	–	–	no Cup	
1965–66	3	Serie C	5th	9	7	no Playoff	–	–	no Cup	
1966–67	3	Serie C	/	–	–	Withdrew	–	–	no Cup	
1967–68	4	Serie D	?	?	?	no Playoff	–	–	no Cup	
1968–69	4	Serie D	?	?	?	no Playoff	–	–	no Cup	
1969–70	4	Serie D	?	?	?	no Playoff	–	–	no Cup	
1970–71	4	Serie D	?	?	?	no Playoff	–	–	Fourth round	
1971–72	4	Serie D	?	?	?	Promoted	?	?	First round	
1972–73	3	Serie C	7th	10	12	DNQ	–	–	no Cup	
1973–74	3	Serie C	12th	6	16	Relegated	–	–	no Cup	
1974–75	4	Serie D	1st	?	?	Promoted^{Playoff}	9	1	no Cup	
1975–76	4	Serie C	1st	?	?	Runner–up^{Playoff}	?	?	no Cup	
1976–77	4	Serie C	6th	11	11	DNQ	–	–	no Cup	
1977–78	4	Serie C	1st	6	4	3rd^{Playoff}	13	5	no Cup	
1978–79	4	Serie C1	3rd	9	5	8th^{Playoff}	3	11	no Cup	
1979–80	4	Serie C1	3rd	8	6	6th^{Playoff}	4	10	no Cup	
1980–81	4	Serie C1	7th	3	11	Relegated	–	–	no Cup	
1981–82	5	Serie C2	2nd	17	5	Promoted	–	–	no Cup	
1982–83	4	Serie C1	2nd	26	6	Promoted^{Playoff}	2	1	no Cup	
1983–84	3	Serie B	7th	16	14	DNQ	–	–	no Cup	
1984–85	3	Serie B	T-2nd	22	8	DNQ	–	–	no Cup	
1985–86	3	Serie B	T-2nd	20	10	DNQ	–	–	no Cup	
1986–87	3	Serie B D'Ecc.	9th	14	16	DNQ	–	–	no Cup	
1987–88	3	Serie B D'Ecc.	13th	12	18	Playout	1	0	no Cup	
1988–89	3	Serie B D'Ecc.	5th	18	12	DNQ	–	–	no Cup	
1989–90	3	Serie B D'Ecc.	2nd	23	7	Promoted^{Playoff}	2	0	no Cup	
1990–91	2	Serie A2	8th	13	17	Promoted^{Playoff}	6	4	Last 32	
1991–92	1	Serie A1	14th	10	20	Relegated^{Playout}	3	7	Last 16	
1992–93	2	Serie A2	10th	14	16	5th^{Playoff}	3	7	Last 32	
1993–94	2	Serie A2	11th	12	18	DNQ	–	–	Last 16	
1994–95	2	Serie A2	14th	11	23	DNQ	–	–	Last 32	
1995–96	2	Serie A2	14th	9	23	Relegated	–	–	Last 32	
1996–97	3	Serie B D'Ecc.	7th	11	11	2nd^{Playout}	7	5	no Cup	
1997–98	6	Serie C2	?	?	?	Promoted	?	?	no Cup	
1998–99	4	Serie B2	2nd	18	8	Runner–up^{Promoted}	5	3	no Cup	
1999-00	3	Serie B D'Ecc.	13th	10	16	Playout	3	2	First round	
2000–01	3	Serie B D'Ecc.	12th	12	14	DNQ	–	–	Last 32	
2001–02	3	Serie B D'Ecc.	6th	14	12	Quarter-finalist^{Playoff}	1	2	Last 32	
2002–03	3	Serie B D'Ecc.	4th	19	11	Runner–up^{Playoff}	5	3	DNQ	
2003–04	3	Serie B D'Ecc.	2nd	22	8	Runner–up^{Promoted}	6	4	DNQ	
2004–05	2	Serie A2	10th	13	17	DNQ	–	–	DNQ	
2005–06	2	Serie A2	16th	4	26	Relegated	–	–	DNQ	
2006–07	3	Serie B D'Ecc.	3rd	19	11	Quarter-finalist^{Playoff}	1	2	First round	
2007–08	3	Serie B D'Ecc.	2nd	18	8	Runner–up^{Playoff}	7	2	Runner–up^{Winter cup}	
2008–09	3	Serie B D'Ecc.	5th	13	13	Quarter-finalist^{Playoff}	1	2	DNQ	
2009–10	3	Serie B D'Ecc.	5th	17	11	Quarter-finalist^{Playoff}	1	2	DNQ	
2010–11	3	Serie B D'Ecc.	1st	22	8	Promoted^{Playoff}	6	5	Second round	
2011–12	5	Div. Nazionale C	1st	30	0	Promoted^{Playoff}	6	0	Winner	
2012–13	4	Div. Nazionale B	3rd	23	7	Semi-finalist^{Playoff}	3	2	DNQ	
2013–14	2	Div. Nazionale A	11th	14	16	DNQ	–	–	DNQ	
2014–15	2	Serie A2	10th	11	15	DNQ	–	–	DNQ	
2015–16	2	Serie A2	7th	16	14	Last 16^{Playoff}	2	3	DNQ	
2016–17	2	Serie A2	8th	15	15	Last 16^{Playoff}	0	3	DNQ	
2017–18	2	Serie A2	6th	15	15	Last 16^{Playoff}	1	3	Quarter finals	
2018–19	2	Serie A2	9th	14	14	Last 16^{Playoff}	2	3	DNQ	
2019–20	2	Serie A2	season cancelled						Quarter finals	
2020–21	2	Serie A2								
2022-23	2	Serie A2	8	10	14	Last 13-18			Winner	
2023–24	2	Serie A2	1st	29	3	Promoted ^{Playoff}	9	2	Semifinals	
2024–25	1	LBA	2nd	22	8	Semifinals	3	3	Quarterfinals	

== Past rosters and players ==
Reggie Johnson is the only player in the Sicilian team’s history to have won an NBA championship ring with the Philadelphia 76ers in 1983, while Langston Galloway reached the finals with the Phoenix Suns in 2021. Francesco Mannella, a Tuscan point guard and captain in Serie A, played for eleven seasons across four divisions (from Serie C1 to Serie A1).

=== Retired numbers ===
In the history of Trapani basketball, three jersey numbers have been retired:

4	Davide Virgilio	Retired in 2014
12	Francesco Mannella	Retired in 2015
13	Davide Lot	Retired in 2023

=== Notable players ===
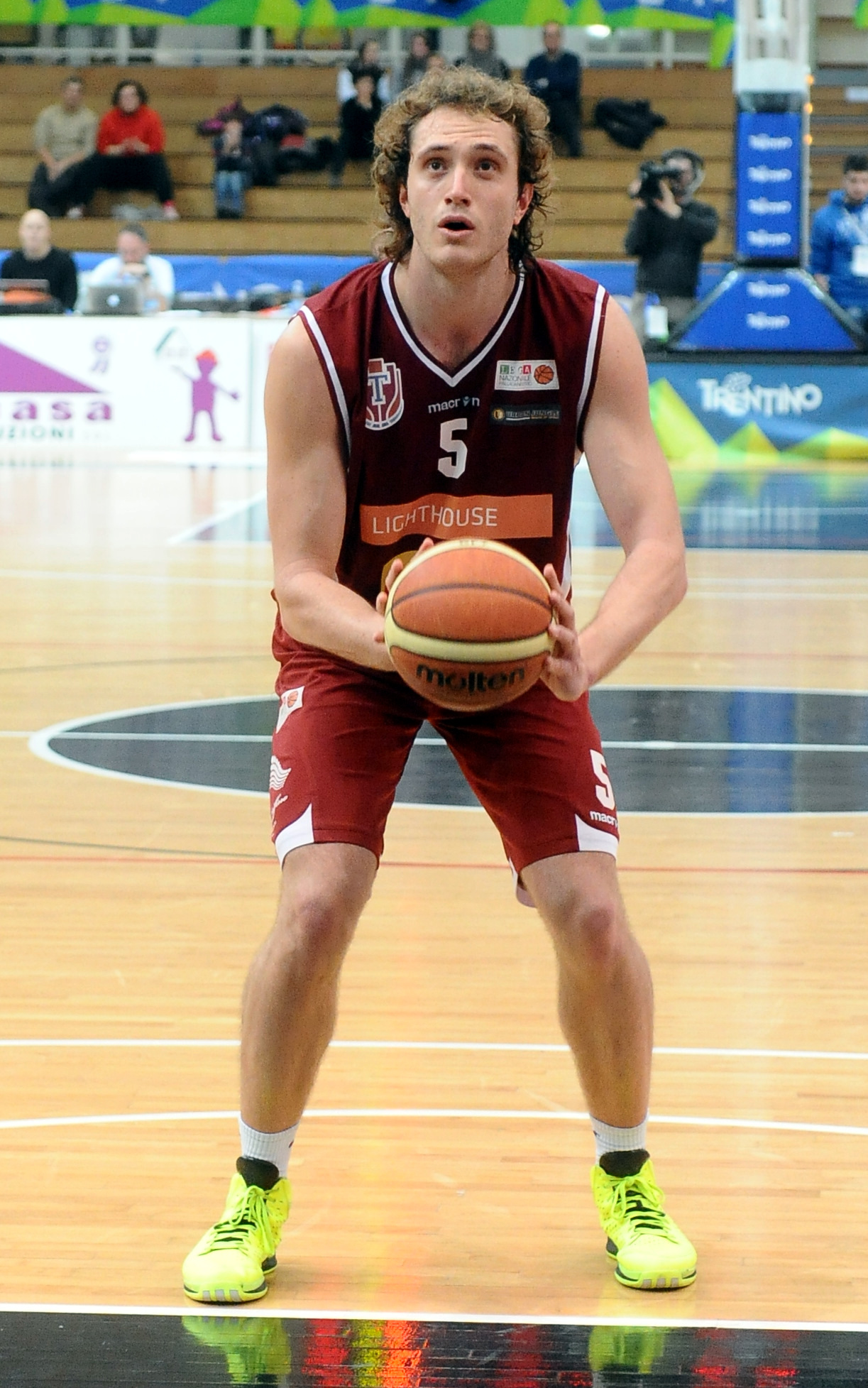
Andrea Renzi

- Reggie Johnson 1 seasons: '90–'91
- Wendell Alexis 2 seasons: '91–'93
- John Shasky 1 seasons: '91–'92
- Ron Rowan 1 seasons: '93–'94
- Stephen Howard 1 seasons: '93–'94
- Bob Thornton 1 seasons: '94
- Franjo Arapović 1 seasons: '95–'96
- Augusto Binelli 2 seasons: '02–'04
- Kris Clack 1 seasons: '04–'05
- Chris Owens 1 seasons: '04–'05
- Brent Darby 1 seasons: '04–'05
- Anthony Dobbins 1 season: '05
- Greg Newton 1 season: '05
- T. J. Sorrentine 1 season: '05
- Chris Haslam 1 season: '05–'06
- Juan Mendez 1 season: '05–'06
- Robert Lowery 1 season: '13–'14
- Andrea Renzi 6 seasons: '13 – present
- T.J. Bray 1 season: '14–'15
- Alex Legion 1 season: '14–15
- Elijah Childs 1 season: '21–22
- Chris Horton 2 seasons: '23–25
- Tibor Pleiß 1 season: '24–25
- Adama Sanogo 1 season: '25

== Presidents and coaches ==
=== Presidents ===
The recent history of basketball in Trapani has seen several presidents, many of whom are representatives of local entrepreneurship.

Francesco Todaro, an architect and entrepreneur, served as treasurer and vice president under Garraffa’s management. In 1994, he took over the club during its challenging final two years in Serie A2, later handing over leadership to Carlo Maccotta and Salvatore Mazzara.

Alberto Montericcio, a Trapani doctor and entrepreneur, co-founded Basket Trapani in 1997 with Filippo Mucaria and Andrea Magaddino. Following Mucaria’s resignation in 2000, Montericcio transferred full management to Magaddino.

Andrea Magaddino, a Trapani civil lawyer and former basketball player for Edera Trapani, co-founded the Associazione Basket Trapani in 1997 with local entrepreneurs Alberto Montericcio and Filippo Mucaria, acquiring the Serie C2 title from Amatori Trapani. He later led the club alone, achieving notable successes such as five promotion finals in Serie B d’Eccellenza/Serie A Dilettanti and a promotion to Legadue.

Alessandro Massinelli, an entrepreneur from Ribera (AG), with prior executive experience at Ares Ribera, Ares Palermo, and Verga Palermo, acquired the club’s ownership on 16 June 2009. His tenure was tumultuous, marked by financial difficulties that caused unrest within the team, though it still achieved promotion to Legadue. This promotion was later revoked by the FIP federal council, resulting in the team’s forced enrollment in Divisione Nazionale C, a three-division demotion.

Pietro Basciano, a Trapani entrepreneur with businesses in Emilia-Romagna, acquired the club in August 2011, forgoing an appeal to the TAR initiated by the Massinelli management against the FIP. He began a new era, renaming the club Pallacanestro Trapani Sporting Club and, after two years, led it to the second-tier national championship, DNA Gold, by exchanging its sporting title with Scafati Basket. The team reached the promotion playoffs for Serie A1 a few times, exiting in the first round. Basciano remained president until June 2023, when he did not register the team for the Serie A2 championship, unable to reach an agreement for the transfer to entrepreneur Valerio Antonini.

Valerio Antonini, a Roman entrepreneur and manager in the global agricultural commodity trading sector, re-founded the club in June 2023, naming it Trapani Shark. He acquired the sporting title of Stella Azzurra Roma and established a multi-sport organization with FC Trapani 1905. On 9 June 2024, he won the promotion final against Fortitudo Bologna, returning Trapani to Serie A after thirty-two years.

==== Chronology of presidents ====
- 1956–1959:
- 1959–1960: Don Mario Tomasi
- 1960–1963:
- 1963–1964: Don Roberto Erthler
- 1964–1965: Francesco Calamia
- 1965: Giuseppe Vento
- 1965–1969: Giovanni Denaro
- 1969–1970:
- 1970–1971: Francesco Di Paola
- 1971–1976: Antonio Montanti
- 1976–1978: Francesco Grimaldi
- 1978–1979:
- 1979–1981: Giovanni Crimi
- 1981–1994: Vincenzo Garraffa
- 1994–1996: Francesco Osvaldo Todaro
- 1996: Carlo Maccotta
- 1996–1997: Salvatore Mazzara
- 1997–2001: Alberto Montericcio
- 2001–2009: Andrea Magaddino
- 2009–2011: Alessandro Massinelli
- 2011–2023: Pietro Basciano
- 2023–present: Valerio Antonini

=== Coaches ===
The most well-known coach was Riccardo Sales, who coached both the men’s and women’s Italian national basketball teams, but the most beloved was undoubtedly Gianfranco Benvenuti, who led the team to promotion first to Serie A2 and later to Serie A1.

==== Chronology of coaches ====
- 1958–1961: Ettore Daidone
- 1961–1962: Ettore Daidone and Giuseppe Vento (player-coach)
- 1962–1966: Giuseppe Vento (player-coach)
- 1966–1967: Alberto Cardella (9–7) (Note: 1965–1966 season)
- 1967–1968: Unknown
- 1968–1970: Giuseppe Vento
- 1970–1974: Giuseppe Vento (player-coach)
- 1974–1975: Francesco Di Paola
- 1975–1977: Leonardo Mione (11–11) (Note: 1976–1977 season)
- 1977–1978: Antonino Fodale (6–4) (13–5)
- 1978–1979: Leonardo Mione (9–5) (3–11)
- 1979–1980: Alberto Cardella (8–6) (4–10)
- 1980: Cristoforo Monaco
- 1980–1982: Giuseppe Barbara
- 1982: Piero Musumeci
- 1982: Antonino Fodale
- 1982–1984: Emilio Trivelli (42–20) (2–1)
- 1984–1986: Bruno Boero (42–18)
- 1986–1988: Stefano Michelini (26–34) (1–0)
- 1988–1991: Gianfranco Benvenuti (54–36) (8–4)
- 1991–1992: Giancarlo Sacco (10–20) (3–7)
- 1992–1993: Riccardo Sales (14–16) (3–7)
- 1993–1994: Giovanni Gebbia (5–10)
- 1994: Giancarlo Sacco (7–8)
- 1994–1995: Gianfranco Benvenuti (2–3)
- 1995: Riccardo Cantone (5–11)
- 1995–1996: Giuseppe Barbara (4–9)
- 1996: Giovanni Papini (0–4)
- 1996: Alberto Cardella (3–7)
- 1996: Giancarlo Sacco
- 1996–1997: Marco Morganti (11–11) (7–5)
- 1997–1998: Rosario Nicosia
- 1998–2000: Giacomo Genovese (18–8) (5–3)
- 2000–2001: Gianni Lambruschi (5–7) (3–2)
- 2001: Marco Morganti (7–7)
- 2001–2002: Gianni Montemurro (14–12) (1–2)
- 2002–2003: Massimo Bernardi (19–11) (5–4)
- 2003–2004: Tony Trullo (22–8) (6–4)
- 2004–2005: Luca Banchi (13–17)
- 2005–2006: Luigi Gresta (1–4)
- 2006: Giancarlo Sacco (3–22)
- 2006–2008: Gianluca Tucci (37–19) (8–4)
- 2008–2009: Marco Calvani (6–6)
- 2009: Marcello Perazzetti (7–7) (1–2)
- 2009–2011: Giovanni Benedetto (39–19) (7–7)
- 2011–2013: Flavio Priulla (53–7) (9–2)
- 2013–2015: Lino Lardo (25–31)
- 2015–2018: Ugo Ducarello (43–41) (2–6)
- 2018–2024: Daniele Parente (103–80)
- 2024: Andrea Diana (13–3)
- 2024–present: Jasmin Repeša (25–12)
- Statistics updated as of 9 June 2025

== Honours ==
=== National competitions ===
- Italian Amateur Champion: 1

2023–24

- Promotions from Serie A2 to Serie A1: 1

1990–1991

- Supercoppa LNP Serie A2: 1

2023

- Promotions from Divisione Nazionale A to Legadue: 1

2010–2011

- Promotions from Serie B d'Eccellenza to Serie A2: 1

1989–1990

- Coppa Italia LNP Divisione Nazionale C: 1

2011–12

=== Interregional competitions ===
- Divisione Nazionale C: 1

2011–2012

- Promotions from Serie C1 to Serie B: 1

1982–1983

- Promotions from Serie C2 to Serie C1: 1

1981–1982

- Promotions from Serie D to Serie C: 2

1971–1972, 1974–1975

=== Finals played ===
- Serie A2

2023–2024 vs Fortitudo Bologna (Italian amateur championship final)

- Serie B d'Eccellenza

1987–1988 vs Esperia Cagliari (relegation playoff)
1989–1990 vs Sangiorgese (promotion final)
2002–2003 vs Dinamo Sassari (promotion final)
2003–2004 vs Castelletto Ticino (promotion final)
2003–2004 vs Nuova A.M.G. Sebastiani Basket Rieti (promotion playoff)
2007–2008 vs N.B. Brindisi (promotion playoff)

- Serie A Dilettanti

2010–2011 vs Pallacanestro Brescia (Italian amateur championship final)
2010–2011 vs Cestistica Ostuni (promotion playoff)

- Serie B2

1998–1999 vs Sutor Basket Montegranaro (promotion final)

- Serie C/Serie C1/Divisione Nazionale C

1977–1978 vs Virtus Ragusa (promotion playoff)
1982–1983 vs Virtus Ragusa (promotion playoff)
2011–2012 vs Pol. Basket Acireale (promotion final)

- Coppa Sicilia

1986–1987 vs Virtus Ragusa

- Coppa Italia Serie B d'Eccellenza

2007–2008 vs Virtus Siena

- Coppa Italia Divisione Nazionale C

2011–2012 vs Benedetto XIV Cento

- Supercoppa LNP

2023 vs Blu Basket 1971

=== Individual awards ===
==== Players ====
- Best Sixth Man

(United States) JD Notae (2024–2025)

- Best Starting Five (Regular Season)

(United States) Justin Robinson (2024–2025)

==== Executives ====
- Executive of the Year

(Italy) Julio Trovato (2023–2024)

== Fanbase ==
The basketball fanbase supporting the team in Trapani and across Italy, initially formed as the CUCN, now consists of four groups: Trapanesi Granata, Nessuna Resa Ultras Trapani, Invictissimi Drepanum Nord, and Gate 91100 Trapani. The fiercest rivalry has been with Virtus Ragusa, particularly during the 1980s and 1990s.

=== Friendships and rivalries ===
Friendly fanbases

- Pallacanestro Brescia
- Orlandina Basket
- JuveCaserta Basket
- Blu Basket 1971
- Dinamo Sassari
- S.S. Basket Napoli
- Universo Treviso Basket

Rival fanbases

- New Basket Brindisi
- Fortitudo Agrigento
- Virtus Kleb Ragusa
- Basket Cefalù
- Basket Barcellona
- Auxilium Pallacanestro Torino

== See also ==
- Sport in Sicily

== Bibliography ==
- Auci, Franco (2005). Cento anni fa 1905, da quel seme: dalle origini alla prima C/2 (1978–79) [One hundred years ago in 1905, from that seed: from its origins to the first C/2 (1978–79)]. Arti grafiche Cosentino, Trapani.
- Cardella, Alberto (1984). La Pallacanestro Trapani dalle origini... ai nostri giorni (1984) [Trapani Basketball from its origins... to the present day (1984)]. CONI.
- Vari, Autori (1984). Trapani: vocazione basket [Trapani: a vocation for basketball]. CONI.
- Vento, Roald (2010). Amici... oltre il basket [Friends... beyond basketball]. Arti grafiche Corrao, Trapani.
- Autori vari (1982–1994). Ciuff: periodico della Pallacanestro Trapani [Ciuff: Trapani Basketball magazine]. Pallacanestro Trapani.
- Vari, Autori (1995–1999). Il Ciuff: periodico del basket trapanese [Il Ciuff: Trapani basketball magazine]. Pallacanestro Trapani.
- Autori vari (1988–1996). Forza Trapani: periodico dei tifosi granata [Forza Trapani: magazine for the maroon fans]. Avanguardia.
