= Andrea Renzi (basketball) =

Italian basketball player (born 1989)

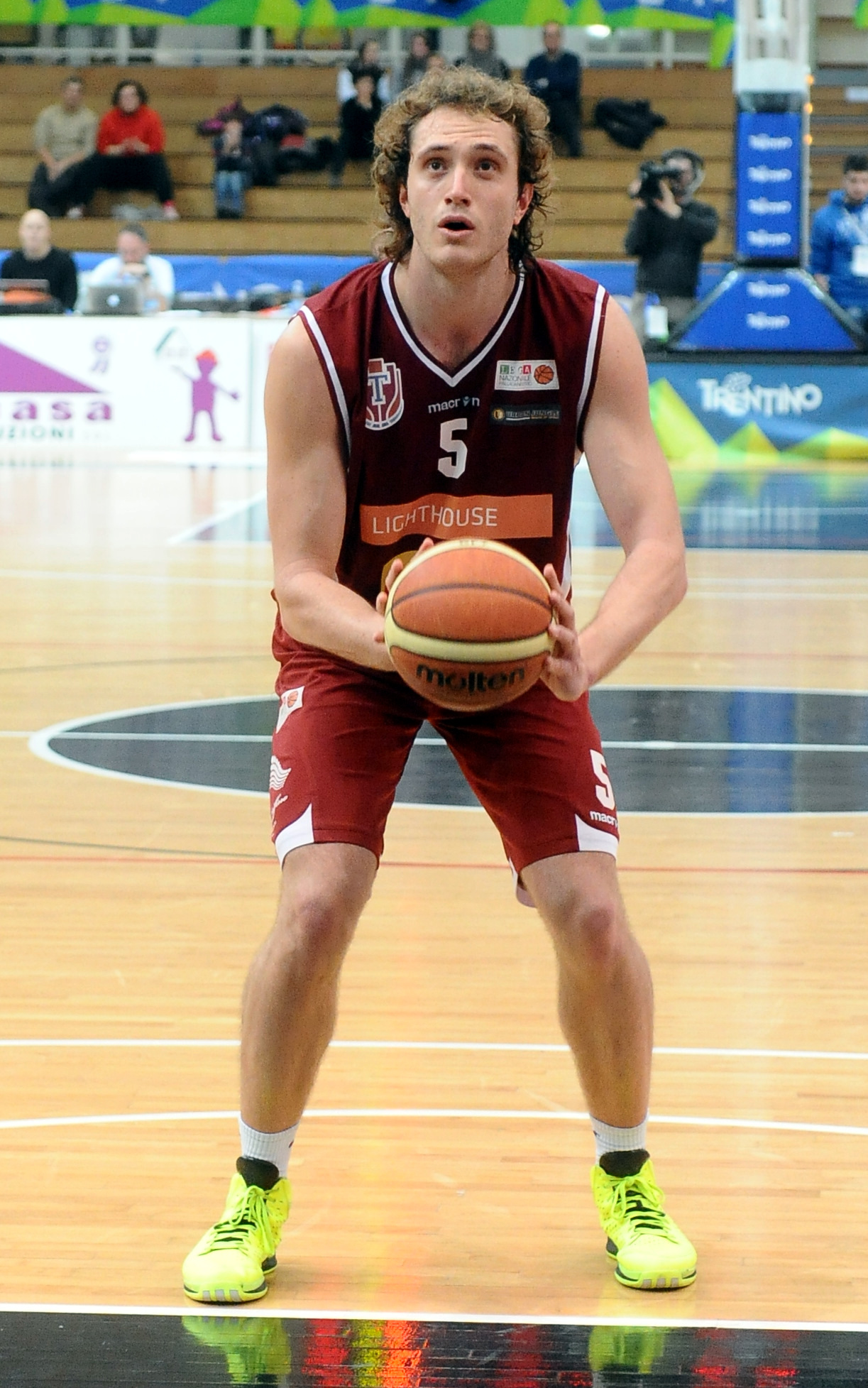

No. 5 – Pallacanestro Trapani
- Position: Power forward / center
- League: Legadue Basket

Personal information
- Born: August 18, 1989 (age 37) Genoa, Italy
- Listed height: 2.08 m (6 ft 10 in)
- Listed weight: 105 kg (231 lb)

Career information
- Playing career: 2006–present

Career history
- 2006–2010: Benetton Treviso
- 2010–2012: Scaligera Verona
- 2012–2013: Angelico Biella
- 2013–present: Pallacanestro Trapani

Andrea Renzi (born 18 August 1989) is an Italian professional basketball player.

== Pro career ==
From 2006 to 2010 he played for the Italian League club Pallacanestro Treviso. He then played with Scaligera Verona and Angelico Biella. In July 2013, he signed with Pallacanestro Trapani.

== Italian national team ==
Renzi has also been a member of the senior men's Italian national basketball team at the EuroBasket 2011.
