= Andrea Diana =

Italian basketball coach

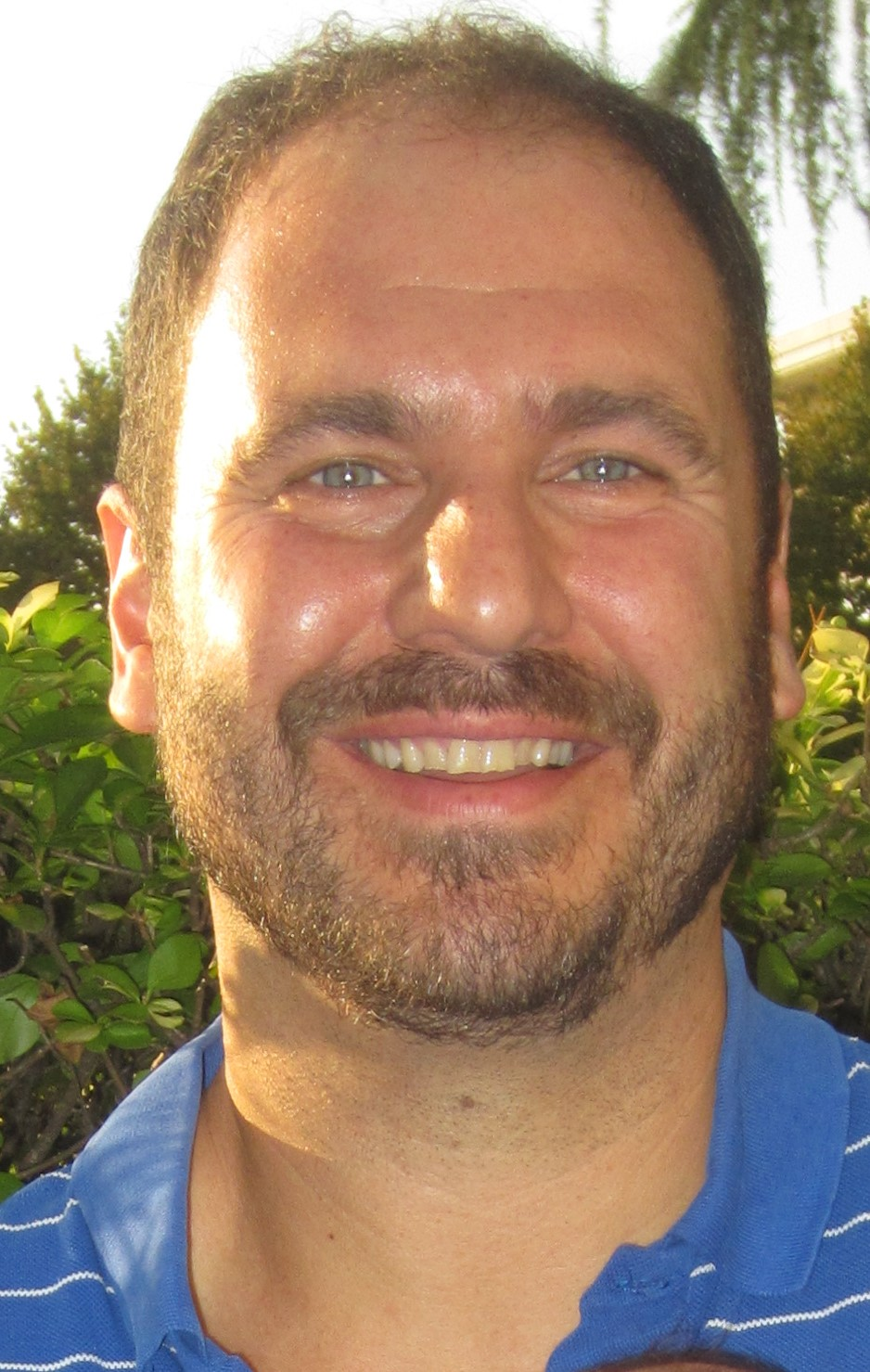

Free Agent
- Position: Head coach

Personal information
- Born: 16 February 1975 (age 51) Livorno, Italy
- Coaching career: 2000–present

Career history

Coaching
- 2000–2008: Don Bosco Livorno
- 2008–2009: Basket Livorno (assistant)
- 2009–2010: 4 Torri Ferrara
- 2011–2014: Pallacanestro Brescia (assistant)
- 2014–2019: Pallacanestro Brescia
- 2019–2021: Scaligera Verona
- 2021–2023: Virtus Bologna (assistant)
- 2024–2025: Trapani Shark (assistant)

Career highlights
- As head coach: 2x Italian Second League champion (2016, 2024); As assistant coach: EuroCup champion (2022); 2x Italian Supercup winner (2021, 2022)

Andrea Diana (born 16 February 1975) is an Italian professional basketball coach.

== Coaching career ==
=== First years (2000–2011) ===
Diana began his coaching career within the youth system of Basket Livorno. In 1998, as Luca Bechi's assistant, he won the national "Allievi" title and then continued his coaching career in his hometown, Livorno, at the Don Bosco Livorno, where he spent eight years, from 2000 to 2008, as first coach and as assistant coach. The following year he became head coach of 4 Torri Ferrara, a club coordinated by Mario De Sisti, a former professional basketball coach in Serie A.

=== Pallacanestro Brescia (2011–2019) ===
In 2011, Sandro Dell'Agnello hired Diana as first assistant coach at Pallacanestro Brescia, under coach Alberto Martelossi. In the 2014–15 season, Diana became Brescia's head coach and in his first year he brought Brescia to the playoff's semifinals. In the following season he was confirmed at the helm of the Brescia, achieving an historic promotion to Serie A. In the 2017–18 season he reached LBA's semifinals and in the following year he took part in the EuroCup. In May 2019 he left the Lombard club after eight years.

=== Scaligera Verona (2019–2021) ===
n December 2019, Diana became the new head coach of Scaligera Basket Verona, succeeding Luca Dalmonte. In June 2020, he was confirmed at the helm of the club, renewing for another season with an option for the next one. However, in February 2021, due to the poor results, he was relieved of the position of head coach.

=== Assistant at Virtus Bologna (2021–2023) ===
In July 2021, Diana was named an assistant coach for Virtus Bologna under Sergio Scariolo. On 21 September, the team won the second Supercup in its history, defeating Olimpia Milano 90–84. Moreover, after having ousted Lietkabelis, Ulm and Valencia in the first three rounds of the playoffs, on 11 May 2022, Virtus defeated Frutti Extra Bursaspor by 80–67 at the Segafredo Arena, winning its first EuroCup and qualifying for the EuroLeague after 14 years.

=== Trapani Shark (2024–2025) ===
On March 18, 2024, he signed with Trapani Shark of the Serie A2.
