= 1992 XXVIII FIBA International Christmas Tournament =

1992 XXVIII FIBA International Christmas Tournament "Trofeo Raimundo Saporta-Memorial Fernando Martín"
- Sport: Basketball
- Finals champions: (Spain) Real Madrid Teka
- Runners-up: (Spain) Estudiantes Argentaria

FIBA International Christmas Tournament seasons
- ← 1991 1993 →

The 1992 XXVIII FIBA International Christmas Tournament "Trofeo Raimundo Saporta-Memorial Fernando Martín" was the 28th edition of the FIBA International Christmas Tournament. It took place at Palacio de Deportes de la Comunidad de Madrid, Madrid, Spain, on 24, 25 and 26 December 1992 with the participations of Real Madrid Teka (champions of the 1991–92 FIBA European Cup), Estudiantes Argentaria (semifinalists of the 1991–92 Liga ACB), Cibona (champions of the 1991–92 A-1 Liga) and Maccabi Tel Aviv (champions of the 1991–92 Ligat HaAl).

== League stage ==
Day 1, December 24, 1992

Team 1	Score	Team 2
Real Madrid Teka (Spain)	105–96	(Croatia) Cibona
Estudiantes Argentaria (Spain)	94–80	(Israel) Maccabi Tel Aviv

Day 2, December 25, 1992

Team 1	Score	Team 2
Real Madrid Teka (Spain)	97–89	(Spain) Estudiantes Argentaria
Cibona (Croatia)	88–79	(Israel) Maccabi Tel Aviv

Day 3, December 26, 1992

Team 1	Score	Team 2
Real Madrid Teka (Spain)	72–73	(Israel) Maccabi Tel Aviv
Estudiantes Argentaria (Spain)	107–86	(Croatia) Cibona

== Final standings ==
	Team	Pld	Pts	W	L	PF	PA
1.	(Spain) Real Madrid Teka	3	5	2	1	274	258
2.	(Spain) Estudiantes Argentaria	3	5	2	1	290	263
3.	(Croatia) Cibona	3	4	1	2	270	291
4.	(Israel) Maccabi Tel Aviv	3	4	1	2	232	254

1992 XXVIII FIBA International Christmas Tournament
"Trofeo Raimundo Saporta-Memorial Fernando Martín" Champions

Real Madrid Teka
19th title
