= Brent Darby =

American basketball player (1981–2011)

Personal information
- Born: June 6, 1981 River Rouge, Michigan, U.S.
- Died: December 6, 2011 (aged 30) Detroit, Michigan, U.S.
- Listed height: 6 ft 1 in (1.85 m)

Career information
- High school: River Rouge (River Rouge, Michigan)
- College: Ohio State (1999–2003)
- NBA draft: 2003: undrafted
- Playing career: 2003–2010
- Position: Point guard

Career history
- 2003–2004: AZS Koszalin
- 2004: Spójnia Stargard Szczeciński
- 2004: Maccabi Rishon LeZion
- 2004–2005: Pallacanestro Trapani
- 2005–2006: Carife Ferrara
- 2006–2007: Air Avellino
- 2007–2008: Dinamo Sassari
- 2008–2009: Pistoia Basket 2000
- 2009: Pepsi Caserta
- 2009–2010: Limoges CSP
- 2010: Reyer Venezia Mestre

Career highlights
- Polish League Top Scorer (2004)

Brent Darby (June 6, 1981 – December 6, 2011) was an American professional basketball player. He played at the point guard position.

== College career ==
Darby played college basketball with the Ohio State Buckeyes, between 1999 and 2003, and was a part of two Big Ten champion teams. He averaged 9.6 points per game in his sophomore season, 12.8 points per game as a junior, and 18.3 points and 4.4 assists per game in his senior year, in 2002–03. At the end of his college career, he was ranked 25th on the school's career scoring list, with 1,368 points scored.

== Professional career ==
After college, Darby played professional basketball internationally, from 2003 until 2009, in Israel, Poland, Spain, and France (Limoges CSP), and he also spent several years in Italy (Pepsi Juvecaserta Basket, Giorgio Tesi PT, Banco di Sardegna Sassari, S.S. Felice Scandone (Sidigas AV), Umana Reyer Venezia Mestre).

== Personal life and death ==
Darby eventually had to stop playing basketball, as he battled a series of blood clot problems. Doctors implanted filters in Darby's body to break up clots before they reached his lungs, and he had a surgery to remove a large clot from his leg. He died in 2011.
