= Riccardo Sales =

Italian basketball player and coach (1941–2006)

Riccardo Sales (14 August 1941 – 14 May 2006) was an Italian basketball player and coach. From 1969 to 1974 he coached Pallacanestro Milano 1958, before joining Nuova Pallacanestro Gorizia for several season. In 1977, Sales moved to Basket Brescia where he stayed until 1983. In 1979, Sales began a term vice coaching the Italian national basketball team, ending in 1988. From 1983–1986 he coached Pallacanestro Varese, and moved to Pallacanestro Treviso until 1990. In 1990–1991, Sales returned to his old club Basket Brescia, and joined Pallacanestro Trapani for the 1992–93 season. His final term coaching was the women's national team in 1994 until 2000, during which he led them to the 1996 Summer Olympics in Atlanta, and to three EuroBasket tournaments in 1995, 1997 and 1999.
