= 1991 XXVII FIBA International Christmas Tournament =

1991 XXVII FIBA International Christmas Tournament "Trofeo Raimundo Saporta-Memorial Fernando Martín"
- Sport: Basketball
- Finals champions: (Spain) Real Madrid Asegurator
- Runners-up: (Israel) Maccabi Elite Tel Aviv

FIBA International Christmas Tournament seasons
- ← 1990 1992 →

The 1991 XXVII FIBA International Christmas Tournament "Trofeo Raimundo Saporta-Memorial Fernando Martín" was the 27th edition of the FIBA International Christmas Tournament. It took place at Palacio de Deportes de la Comunidad de Madrid, Madrid, Spain, on 24, 25, and 26 December 1991, with the participations of Real Madrid Asegurator (runners-up of the 1990–91 FIBA Korać Cup), Maccabi Elite Tel Aviv (champions of the 1990–91 Ligat HaAl), Australia and Benetton Treviso (5th of the 1990–91 Serie A1 FIP).

== League stage ==
Day 1, December 24, 1991

Team 1	Score	Team 2
Real Madrid Asegurator (Spain)	79–72	Australia
Maccabi Elite Tel Aviv (Israel)	81–74	(Italy) Benetton Treviso

Day 2, December 25, 1991

Team 1	Score	Team 2
Real Madrid Asegurator (Spain)	94–82	(Israel) Maccabi Elite Tel Aviv
Australia	90–80	(Italy) Benetton Treviso

Day 3, December 26, 1991

Team 1	Score	Team 2
Real Madrid Asegurator (Spain)	91–75	(Italy) Benetton Treviso
Maccabi Elite Tel Aviv (Israel)	82–78	Australia

== Final standings ==
	Team	Pld	Pts	W	L	PF	PA
1.	(Spain) Real Madrid Asegurator	3	6	3	0	264	229
2.	(Israel) Maccabi Elite Tel Aviv	3	5	2	1	245	246
3.	Australia	3	4	1	2	240	241
4.	(Italy) Benetton Treviso	3	3	0	3	229	262

1991 XXVII FIBA International Christmas Tournament
"Trofeo Raimundo Saporta-Memorial Fernando Martín" Champions

Real Madrid Asegurator
18th title
