= Pallacanestro Treviso =

Italian youth basketball club

- Founded: 1954; 72 years ago
- History: List: Duomo Folgore (1954–1970) Associazione Pallacanestro Treviso (1970–1991) Pallacanestro Treviso (1991–present)
- Arena: Palaverde
- Capacity: 5,344
- Location: Treviso, Veneto, Italy
- Team colors: Green, White
- President: Giorgio Buzzavo
- Head coach: Marcelo Nicola
- Championships: 2 FIBA Saporta Cups; 5 Italian Leagues; 8 Italian Cups
- Website: www.pallacanestrotreviso.it
| Home | Away |

Pallacanestro Treviso, named Benetton Basket due to a long running sponsorship by the Benetton Group and widely referred to as Benetton Treviso, is an Italian youth basketball club based in Treviso, Veneto.

It was a successful professional club until 2012 when the Benetton Group decided to withdraw, though they retained the youth section at La Ghirada, the sports complex they own. For past club sponsorship names, see sponsorship names.

== History ==
Founded in 1954 as Duomo Folgore, it remained in obscurity for the first few decades of its existence though it did reach the first division Lega Basket Serie A in 1962. However the club only stayed there one season, finishing the league in last place, after which it was hampered by financial problems.

Duomo Folgore was renamed Associazione Pallacanestro Treviso sometime during the 1970s, with new ownership. It then moved up the divisions, reaching the national Serie A2 in 1979. In 1980-81 the team finished third in the league, earning a return to the Serie A.

The Benetton Group started sponsoring the club during the 1981-82 season, which ended with a relegation to the A2. The following year, Benetton would become the majority owners of Pallacanestro Treviso, moving into the newly constructed PalaVerde, owned and financed by the family. Promoted in 1985, it stayed in Serie A one-season before going back down. Another promotion followed in 1987, this one would see the club start a permanent stay in the elite.

In 1991, the club legally became Pallacanestro Treviso (it was commonly called Benetton Treviso at the time), with its status changing from an association to a limited liability company (s.r.l.). That year would spark a new era for Benetton Basket, with the arrival of the legendary Toni Kukoč from the three-peat European Champions of POP 84, but also of Stefano Rusconi from Cagiva Varese and Nino Pellacani, the team would beat Scavolini Pesaro to win their first Serie A title in 1992.

The next season, Benetton won the Italian Cup and reached the Final Four of the FIBA European League (Europe's elite continental competition) that take place in Peace and Friendship Stadium, Piraeus, and in the semifinal defeated PAOK 79–77. In the final, Benetton although it was the favorite of the match, lost to Limoges CSP 55–59.

Though Kukoč left for the NBA in the summer, Riccardo Pittis joined the club that won another Italian Cup that year. They would win their first European title, the FIBA European Cup against Taugrés, in 1995, thanks to players such as Orlando Woolridge and Petar Naumoski, and also became third successive Italian Cup that garnished the trophy cabinet.

Benetton added another Serie A title in 1997, a second FIBA Saporta Cup in 1999 against Pamesa Valencia, and an Italian cup in 2000. During the 2001–02 season they won the Italian Supercup and the league. The next year they did even better with a treble, winning the Supercup, Cup and league but they didn't manage to won the Euroleague title defeated in the final by FC Barcelona.

Adding more league titles after that, Benetton Basket reached the Euroleague Final Four on a few occasions but never managed to win the title.

=== Struggles ===
In February 2011, the Benetton family announced they would be withdrawing their support for professional basketball, effectively calling time on Treviso's top flight status if no other backer could be found.

Well-wishers such as former players Paolo Vazzoler and Pittis tried to rouse support for a new club, Treviso Basket 2012. However their application to take Benetton Basket's place in the Serie A was rejected.

Since then Benetton Basket has focused only on youth development, with the Under 17 squad their most senior. Treviso is represented in professional basket by Universo Treviso Basket—the renamed Treviso Basket 2012—who, as of April 2022, play in the Lega Basket Serie A.

== Honours ==
Total titles: (15)

=== Domestic competitions ===
- Italian League

Winners (5): 1991–92, 1996–97, 2001–02, 2002–03, 2005–06
Runners-up (4): 1992–93, 1994–95, 1998–99, 1999–00

- Italian Cup

Winners (8): 1992–93, 1993–94, 1994–95, 1999–00, 2002–03, 2003–04, 2004–05, 2006–07
Runners-up (2): 1991–92, 1997–98

- Italian Supercup

Winners (4): 1997, 2001, 2002, 2006
Runners-up (5): 1995, 2003, 2004, 2005, 2007

=== European competitions ===
- EuroLeague

Runners-up (2): 1992–93, 2002–03
3rd place (2): 1997–98, 2001–02
Final Four (4): 1993, 1998, 2002, 2003

- FIBA Saporta Cup (defunct)

Winners (2): 1994–95, 1998–99

- FIBA Korać Cup (defunct)

Semifinalists (1): 1996–97

- EuroCup Basketball

4th place (1): 2010–11

=== Other competitions ===
- FIBA International Christmas Tournament (defunct)

4th place (1): 1991

== Top performances in European & worldwide competitions ==
| Season | Achievement | Notes |
EuroLeague
| 1992–93 | Final | defeated PAOK 79-77 in the semi-final, lost to Limoges CSP 55-59 in the final (Athens) |
| 1995–96 | Quarter-finals | eliminated 2–1 by Panathinaikos, 67-70 (L) in Athens, 83-69 (W) and 64-65 (L) in Treviso |
| 1997–98 | Final Four | 3rd place in Barcelona, lost to AEK 66–69 in the semi-final, defeated Partizan 96-89 for the 3rd place game |
| 2000–01 | Quarter-finals | eliminated 2–1 by AEK, 89-97 (L) in Athens, 90-74 (W) in Treviso and 56-71 (L) in Athens |
| 2001–02 | Final Four | 3rd place in Bologna, lost to Kinder Bologna 82–90 in the semi-final, no game for 3rd place |
| 2002–03 | Final | defeated Montepaschi Siena 65-62 in the semi-final, lost to FC Barcelona 65-76 in the final (Barcelona) |
| 2004–05 | Quarter-finals | eliminated 2–0 by Tau Cerámica, 59-98 (L) in Treviso, 64-66 (L) in Vitoria-Gasteiz |
FIBA Saporta Cup
| 1994–95 | Champions | defeated Taugrés 94-86 in the final of European Cup in Istanbul |
| 1998–99 | Champions | defeated Pamesa Valencia 64-60 in the final of Saporta Cup in Zaragoza |
FIBA Korać Cup
| 1996–97 | Semi-finals | eliminated by Aris, 73-77 (L) in Thessaloniki, 87-86 (W) in Treviso |
EuroCup Basketball
| 2008–09 | Quarter-finals | lost to Lietuvos rytas 79-85 in the quarter-final of Final Eight in Turin |
| 2010–11 | Final Four | 4th place in Treviso, lost to Cajasol 63-75 in the semi-final, lost to Cedevita 57-59 in the 3rd place game |

== Players ==
=== FIBA Hall of Famers ===
Pallacanestro Treviso Hall of Famers
Players
| No. | Nat. | Name | Position | Tenure | Inducted |
|---|---|---|---|---|---|
| 7 | (Croatia) | Toni Kukoč | C | 1991–1993 | 2017 |

=== Notable players ===
Note: Flags indicate national team eligibility at FIBA-sanctioned events. Players may hold other non-FIBA nationalities not displayed.

Criteria

To appear in this section a player must have either:

- Set a club record or won an individual award while at the club
- Played at least one official international match for their national team at any time
- Played at least one official NBA match at any time.

2010's

- (United States) Brian Scalabrine 1/2 season: '11
- (United States) E'Twaun Moore 1/2 season: '11
- (United States) Jeff Adrien 1/2 season: '11
- (Israel) Gal Mekel

2000's

- (Lithuania) Donatas Motiejūnas 2 seasons: '09-'11
- (United States) Bobby Dixon 1&1/2 seasons: '08-'09, '10
- (United Kingdom) Pops Mensah-Bonsu 1 season: '07-'08
- (Turkey) Engin Atsür 1 season:'07-'08
- (Greece) Nikos Zisis 2 seasons: '05-'07
- (United States) Drew Nicholas 1 season: '05-'06
- (Italy) Marco Mordente 4 seasons:'04-'08
- (United States) Marcus Goree 3 seasons: '04-'07
- (Lithuania) Ramūnas Šiškauskas 2 seasons: '04-06
- (Italy) Andrea Bargnani 3 seasons: '03-'06
- (Slovenia) Uroš Slokar 3 seasons: '03-'06
- (United States) Maurice Evans 1 season: '03-'04
- (United States) Jermaine Jackson 1 season: '03-'04
- (Georgia (country)) Manuchar Markoishvili 2 season: '02-'04
- (United States) Trajan Langdon 1 season: '02-'03
- (Russia) Sergei Chikalkin 1 season: '01-'02
- (United States) Charlie Bell 1 season: '01-'02
- (Georgia (country)) Nikoloz Tskitishvili 1 season: '01-'02
- (Cuba) Andrés Guibert 1/2 season: '01
- (Spain) Jorge Garbajosa 4 seasons: '00-'04
- (Slovenia) Boštjan Nachbar 2 seasons: '00-'02
- (Republic of Ireland) Alan Tomidy 2 seasons: '00-'02
- (United States) Marcus Brown 1 season: '00-'01

1990's

- (United States) Tyus Edney 4 seasons: '99-'00, '01-'04
- (United States) Jeff Sheppard 1 season: '99-'00
- (Argentina) Marcelo Nicola 6 seasons: '98-'04
- (United States) Henry Williams 4 seasons: '95-'99
- (Federal Republic of Yugoslavia) Željko Rebrača 4 seasons: '95-'99
- (Italy) Davide Bonora 4 seasons: '95-'99
- (North Macedonia) Petar Naumoski 2 seasons: '94-'95, '00-'01
- (United States) Orlando Woolridge 1 season: '94-'95
- (Italy) Riccardo Pittis 11 seasons: '93-'04
- (United States) Winston Garland 1 season: '93-'94
- (United States) Rafael Addison 1 season: '93-'94
- (Italy) Denis Marconato 12 seasons: '92-'95, '96-'05
- (United States) Terry Teagle 1 season: '92-'93
- (Italy) Stefano Rusconi 7 seasons: '91-'98
- (Croatia) Toni Kukoč 2 seasons: '91-'93
- (United States) (Italy) Vinny Del Negro 2 seasons: '90-'92

1980's

- (United States) Dan Gay 3 seasons: '88-'90
- (United States) Kyle Macy 2 seasons: '88-'89
- (United States) Mike Davis 1 season: '87-'88
- (United States) Mark Olberding 1 season: '87-'88
- (Italy) Massimo Iacopini 10 seasons: '85-'95
- (Italy) Massimo Minto 8 seasons: '82-'84, '85-'90

== Head coaches ==
- (Italy) Mario De Sisti (2 seasons: 1979–81)
- (Italy) Piero Pasini (1 season: 1981-82)
- (Italy) Gianmaria Conte (incomplete 1 season: 1982–83)
- (Italy) Gianfranco Lombardi (incomplete 1 season: 1982–83)
- (Italy) Mauro Di Vincenzo (1 season: 1983–84)
- (Italy) Massimo Mangano (incomplete 2 seasons: 1984–86)
- (Hungary) Lajos Toth (incomplete 1 season: 1985–86)
- (Italy) Riccardo Sales (incomplete 4 seasons: 1986–90)
- (Italy) Emanuele Molin (incomplete 1 season: 1989–90)
- (Socialist Federal Republic of Yugoslavia) (Croatia) Petar Skansi (3 seasons: 1990-93)
- (Italy) Fabrizio Frates (1 season: 1993–94)
- (United States) (Italy) Mike D'Antoni (4 seasons: 1994–97, 2001–02)
- (Federal Republic of Yugoslavia) Željko Obradović (2 seasons: 1997–99)
- (Italy) Piero Bucchi (2 seasons: 1999-01)
- (Italy) Ettore Messina (3 seasons: 2002–05)
- (Israel) David Blatt (2 seasons: 2005-07)
- (Italy) Alessandro Ramagli (Sep.-Nov. 2007)
- (Turkey) Oktay Mahmuti (seasons: 2007-09)
- (Croatia) Jasmin Repeša (seasons: 2010-11)
- (Serbia) Aleksandar Đorđević (1 season: 2011–12)

== Sponsorship names ==
Throughout the years, due to sponsorship, the club has been known as:

- Faram Treviso (1977–1979)
- Liberti Treviso (1979–1981)
- Benetton Basket (1981–2012)
