= Sport in Sicily =

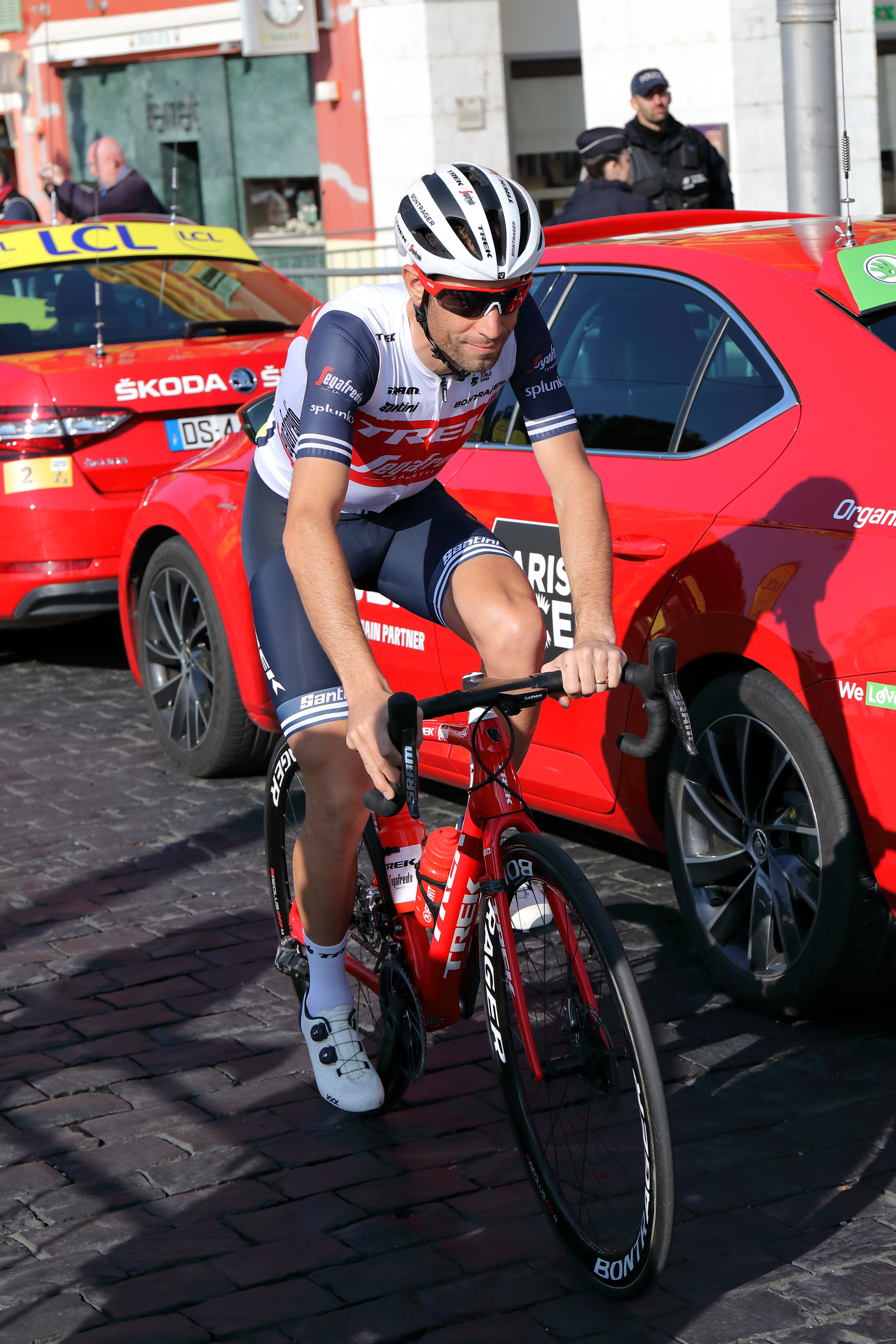
Vincenzo Nibali, probably the best Sicilian sportsman of the history, one of seven cyclists who have won the three Grand Tours in their career.

Sport in Sicily developed at a high level only from the second post-war period onwards, although there are no lack of examples between the two wars, with different clubs in the major Italian leagues.

== History ==
As for the athletes, the first Olympic medals concern fencing: the first gold at the Olympics is thanks to Francesco Gargano at the Antwerp 1920 Olympics in team saber fencing and then to Vincenzo Cuccia in Paris 1924.

== Olympic Games ==
Sicilian athletes at the Olympic Games won a total of 54 medals (20 golds, 23 silvers and 11 bronzes) in 31 editions up to Rio de Janeiro 2016.

These are the 20 gold medals won by Sicily at the Olympic Games, eleven of these in fencing: Francesco Gargano (fencing, Antwerp 1920); Giovanni Canova (fencing, Antwerp 1920); Pietro Speciale (fencing, Antwerp 1920); Vincenzo Cuccia (fencing, Paris 1924); Alberto Pellegrino (fencing, Melbourne 1956 and Rome 1960); Angelo Arcidiacono (fencing, Los Angeles 1984); Giovanni Scalzo (fencing, Los Angeles 1984); Maurizio Randazzo (fencing, Atlanta 1996 and Sydney 2000); Guido Messina (cycling, Helsinki 1952); Sandro Campagna (water polo, Barcelona 1992); Paolo Caldarella (water polo, Barcelona 1992); Giusi Malato, Silvia Bosurgi, Cinzia Ragusa, Maddalena Musumeci (water polo, Athens 2004); Giorgio Avola (fencing, London 2012); Daniele Garozzo (fencing, Rio 2016).

== Team sports ==
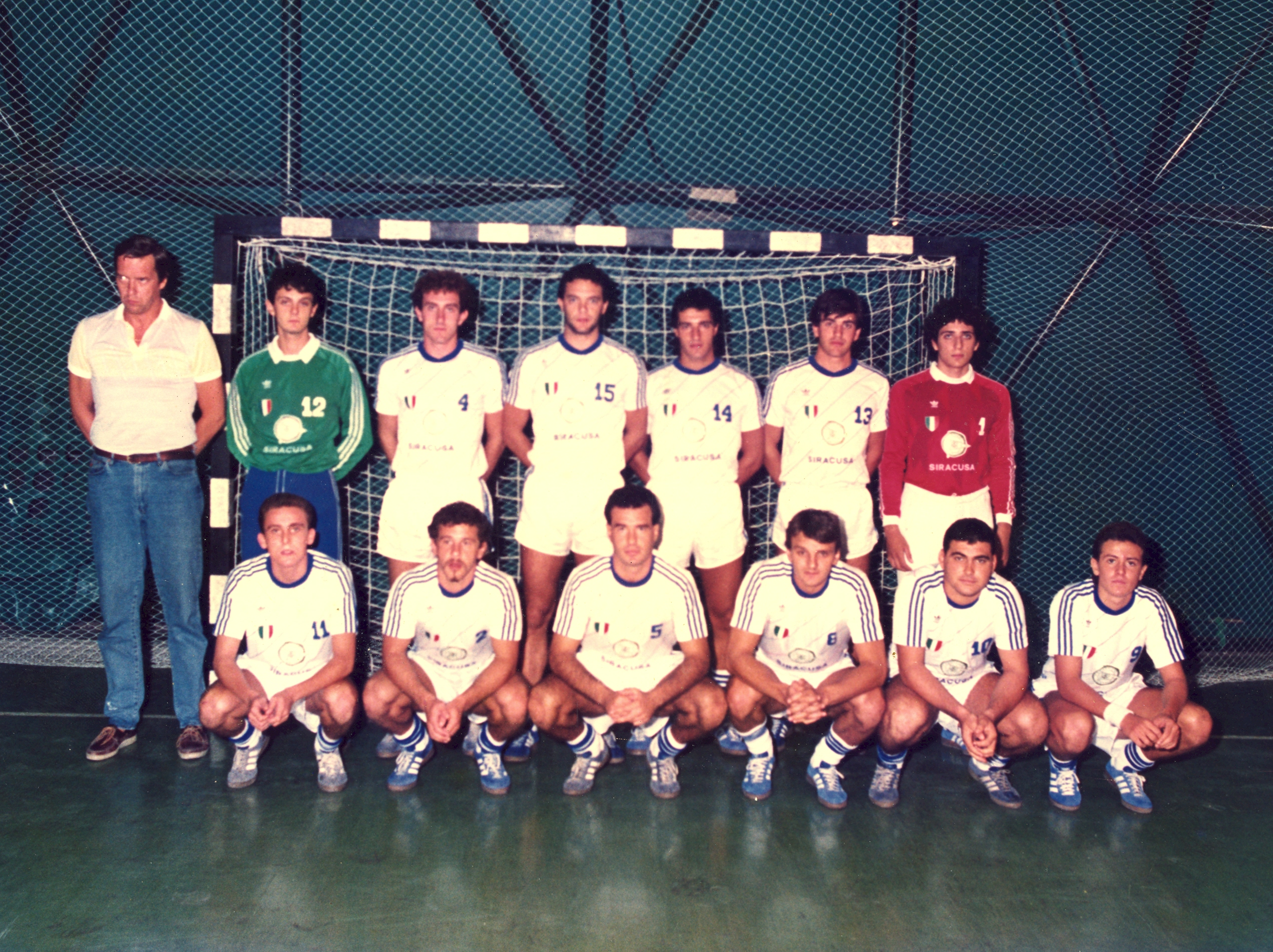
The handball team of Ortigia Syracuse, three-time national champion from '87 to '89.

The first championship in the national team championship was won in the 1977-78 season in volleyball by the team of Paoletti Catania.

In team sports, the first championship dates back to 1978, with the conquest of the Italian men's volleyball championship by Paoletti Catania and, also in Catania, the national and European domination of Orizzonte Catania in the Italian women's water polo championship. In handball Syracuse is the host, winning three scudetti and two Italian cups in the men with Ortigia Syracuse and one scudetto in the women with EOS Syracuse. Scudetti also in Priolo, in women's basketball, with a European title won for Trogylos Priolo itself, in the canoe polo KST Syracuse, and in table tennis with the City of Syracuse.

Catania is the city with the highest number of league titles and international titles on the island.

=== National titles won by Sicilian teams ===
At the end of the 2020 sports season, the Sicilian teams won a total of 86 national titles in team sports. Only the titles won by the maximum league of each sport are taken into consideration.

Female titles

| Championship | Team | City | Province | Seasons | Total | Note |
|---|---|---|---|---|---|---|
| Water polo | Orizzonte | Catania | Catania | '92, '93, '94, '95, '96, '97, '98, '99, '00, '01, '02, '03, '04, '05, '06, '08, '10, '11, '19, '21, '22 | 22 | |
| Canoe polo | Polisportiva Canottieri | Catania | Catania | '99, '09, '11, '13, '14, '15, '16, '17, '18, '19, '21, '22 | 12 | |
| Badminton | Mediterranea Badminton | Cinisi | Palermo | '05, '06, '07, '08, '09, '10, '11, '12, '13 | 9 | |
| Field hockey | CUS | Catania | Catania | '90, '91, '92, '93, '94, '96, '14 | 7 | |
| Field hockey indoor | CUS | Catania | Catania | '80, '85, '88, '91, '93, '97 | 6 | |
| Canoe polo | KTS | Syracuse | Syracuse | '97, '13, '14, '15. '19 | 5 | |
| Handball | Ortigia | Syracuse | Syracuse | '87, '88, '89 | 3 | |
| Flag football | Pink Elephants | Catania | Catania | '14, '17, '18 | 3 | |
| Tennis table | Top Spin | Messina | Messina | '99, '19, '22 | 3 | |
| Basketball | Libertas Trogylos | Priolo | Syracuse | '89, '00 | 2 | |
| Handball | De Gasperi | Enna | Enna | '99, '02 | 2 | |
| Beach Soccer | Catania Beach Soccer | Catania | Catania | '08, '18 | 2 | |
| Tennis table | Emaia | Vittoria | Syracuse | '90, '91 | 2 | |
| Cricket | Cirnechi | Catania | Catania | '01, '02 | 2 | |
| Softball | Islanders | Catania | Catania | '18, '19 | 2 | |
| Volleyball | Pallavolo Catania | Catania | Catania | '78 | 1 | (Note: This was the first ever championship for a Sicilian team in any sport.) |
| Football | Jolly | Catania | Catania | '78 | 1 | |
| Volleyball | Alidea | Catania | Catania | '80 | 1 | |
| Handball | EOS | Syracuse | Syracuse | '00 | 1 | |
| Canoe polo | Canoa Club | Palermo | Palermo | '00 | 1 | |
| Athletics | CUS | Palermo | Palermo | '95 | 1 | |
| Tennis table | Città di Siracusa | Syracuse | Syracuse | '12 | 1 | |
| American football | Cardinals | Palermo | Palermo | '12 | 1 | (Note: National championship of American football 9 players) |
| American football | Elephants | Catania | Catania | '02 | 1 | (Note: National championship of American football 8 players) |
| Total Italian Champion titles won by Sicilian teams | | | | | 86 | |

=== Titles per cities ===
| City | Titles |
|---|---|
| Catania | 56 |
| Syracuse | 10 |
| Cinisi | 9 |
| Palermo | 3 |
| Messina | 2 |
| Enna | 2 |
| Priolo | 2 |
| Vittoria | 2 |
| Total | 86 |

=== Titles per sports ===
| Sport | Men | Women | Total |
|---|---|---|---|
| Water polo | 0 | 20 | 20 |
| Canoe polo | 6 | 10 | 16 |
| Field hockey | 0 | 13 | 13 |
| Badminton | 9 | 0 | 9 |
| Handball | 3 | 3 | 6 |
| Table tennis | 3 | 2 | 5 |
| Flag football | 0 | 3 | 3 |
| American football | 2 | 0 | 2 |
| Basketball | 0 | 2 | 2 |
| Volleyball | 1 | 1 | 2 |
| Cricket | 0 | 2 | 2 |
| Beach soccer | 2 | 0 | 2 |
| Softball | 2 | 0 | 2 |
| Football | 0 | 1 | 1 |
| Athletics | 0 | 1 | 1 |
| Total | 26 | 58 | 86 |

== See also ==
- Sport in Italy
