= 2018–19 LBA season =

Serie A PosteMobile^{1}
- Season: 2018–19
- Duration: 7 October 2018 – June 2019
- Games played: 265
- Teams: 16
- TV partners: Rai Sport, Eurosport

Regular season
- Top seed: AX Armani Exchange Milano
- Season MVP: (United States) Drew Crawford
- Relegated: Fiat Torino

Finals
- Champions: Umana Reyer Venezia
- Runners-up: Banco di Sardegna Sassari
- Semi-finalists: AX Armani Exchange Milano; Vanoli Cremona
- Finals MVP: (United States) Austin Daye

Awards
- Best Young Player: (United States) Tony Carr

Statistical leaders
| Points | (United States) Frank Gaines | 20.3 |
| Rebounds | (Lithuania) Egidijus Mockevičius | 11.5 |
| Assists | (Italy) Luca Vitali | 5.8 |
| Index Rating | (United States) Davon Jefferson | 23.5 |

Records
- Biggest home win: Trieste 110–64 Avellino (December 16, 2018)
- Biggest away win: Avellino 49–79 Venezia (November 25, 2018)
- Highest scoring: Pesaro 106–122 Cremona (December 16, 2018)
- Winning streak: 15 games Banco di Sardegna Sassari
- Losing streak: 8 games Red October Cantù
- Highest attendance: 12,005; AX Milano 72–67 Varese (December 23, 2018)
- Average attendance: 960,823 (4,003 per match)
- All statistics correct as of complete.^{1} Sponsored league name, referring to PosteMobile.

The 2018–19 LBA season, also known as Serie A PosteMobile for sponsorship reasons, was the 97th season of the Lega Basket Serie A (LBA), the men's top tier professional basketball division of the Italian basketball league system (LBA). The regular season began on October 7, 2018, and finished on May 12, 2019, with the playoffs started on May 18 (dependent on an Italian club qualifying for the 2019 EuroLeague Final Four, 2019 EuroCup Playoffs or for the 2019 Champions League Playoffs) and finished on June 22.

As in previous years, Molten Corporation provided the official ball for all matches.

AX Armani Exchange Milano were the defending champions.

Umana Reyer Venezia won their 4th title by beating Banco di Sardegna Sassari in game 7 of the finals.

== Teams ==
=== Promotion and relegation (pre-season) ===
A total of 16 teams contested the league, including 15 sides from the 2017–18 season and one promoted from the 2017–18 Serie A2.

Alma Pallacanestro Trieste was the promoted club from the Serie A2 Basket after beating Novipiù Casale Monferrato at game 3 of league's playoffs, and returned to the top division after a 14 years absence.

Trieste replaced Betaland Capo d'Orlando who were relegated during the previous season.

=== Number of teams by region ===
| Number of teams | Region | Team(s) |
|---|---|---|
| 5 | Lombardy | AX Armani Exchange Milano^{LBA} Germani Basket Brescia; Openjobmetis Varese; Red October Cantù; Vanoli Cremona |
| 2 | Emilia-Romagna | Grissin Bon Reggio Emilia; Segafredo Virtus Bologna |
| 1 | Apulia | New Basket Brindisi |
| 1 | Campania | Sidigas Avellino |
| 1 | Friuli-Venezia Giulia | Alma Pallacanestro Trieste^{A2} |
| 1 | Marche | VL Pesaro |
| 1 | Piedmont | Fiat Torino |
| 1 | Sardinia | Banco di Sardegna Sassari |
| 1 | Trentino-Alto Adige/Südtirol | Dolomiti Energia Trento |
| 1 | Tuscany | OriOra Pistoia |
| 1 | Veneto | Umana Reyer Venezia |

Notes
^LBA 2017–18 LBA champion.
^A2 2017–18 Serie A2 champion.

=== Venues and locations ===
Location of teams in 2018–19 LBA season

| Team | Home city | Arena | Capacity |
|---|---|---|---|
| Alma Pallacanestro Trieste | Trieste | Allianz Dome | 6,943 |
| AX Armani Exchange Milano | Milan | Mediolanum Forum | 12,700 |
| Banco di Sardegna Sassari | Sassari | PalaSerradimigni | 5,000 |
| Dolomiti Energia Trento | Trento | BLM Group Arena | 4,360 |
| Fiat Torino | Turin | PalaVela | 6,305 |
| Germani Basket Brescia | Brescia | PalaLeonessa | 5,200 |
| Grissin Bon Reggio Emilia | Reggio Emilia | PalaBigi | 4,530 |
| New Basket Brindisi | Brindisi | PalaPentassuglia | 3,534 |
| Openjobmetis Varese | Varese | Enerxenia Arena | 5,100 |
| OriOra Pistoia | Pistoia | PalaCarrara | 4,000 |
| Red October Cantù | Cantù | PalaBancoDesio (in Desio) | 6,700 |
| Segafredo Virtus Bologna | Bologna | Unipol Arena | 9,513 |
| Segafredo Virtus Bologna | Bologna | PalaDozza | 5,570 |
| Sidigas Avellino | Avellino | PalaDelMauro | 5,195 |
| Umana Reyer Venezia | Venice | Palasport Taliercio | 3,506 |
| Vanoli Cremona | Cremona | PalaRadi | 3,511 |
| VL Pesaro | Pesaro | Adriatic Arena | 10,323 |

=== Personnel and sponsorship ===
| Team | Chairman | Head coach | Captain | Kit manufacturer | Shirt sponsor |
|---|---|---|---|---|---|
| Alma Pallacanestro Trieste | (Italy) Gianluca Mauro | (Italy) Eugenio Dalmasson | (Italy) Andrea Coronica | Adidas | Alma Agenzia per il lavoro, Allianz |
| AX Armani Exchange Milano | (Italy) Livio Proli | (Italy) Simone Pianigiani | (Italy) Andrea Cinciarini | Armani | AX Armani Exchange |
| Banco di Sardegna Sassari | (Italy) Stefano Sardara | (Italy) Gianmarco Pozzecco | (Italy) Giacomo Devecchi | Eye Sport | Banco di Sardegna, Tirrenia |
| Dolomiti Energia Trento | (Italy) Luigi Longhi | (Italy) Maurizio Buscaglia | (Argentina) Andrés Pablo Forray | Spalding | Dolomiti Energia |
| Fiat Torino | (Italy) vacant (Note: On 26 April 2019, President Antonio Forni left the presidency of the team because of the change of ownership.) | (Italy) Paolo Galbiati | (Italy) Giuseppe Poeta | Kappa | Fiat Automobiles |
| Germani Basket Brescia | (Italy) Graziella Bragaglio | (Italy) Andrea Diana | (United States) David Moss | Erreà | Germani Trasporti |
| Grissin Bon Reggio Emilia | (Italy) Maria Licia Ferrarini | (Italy) Stefano Pillastrini | (Italy) Riccardo Cervi | Sportika | Grissin Bon, Mapei |
| New Basket Brindisi | (Italy) Fernando Marino | (Italy) Francesco Vitucci | (Israel) Adrian Banks | Adidas | Enel |
| Openjobmetis Varese | (Italy) Marco Vittorelli | (Italy) Attilio Caja | (Italy) Giancarlo Ferrero | Spalding | Openjobmetis |
| OriOra Pistoia | (Italy) Roberto Maltinti | (Italy) Paolo Moretti | (United States) Dominique Johnson | Erreà | OriOra |
| Red October Cantù | (Russia) Irina Gerasimenko | (Italy) Nicola Brienza | (Nigeria) Ike Udanoh | Eye Sport | Red October Steel Works |
| Segafredo Virtus Bologna | (Italy) vacant (Note: On 9 March 2019, President Alberto Bucci died at 70 years old, due to complications from a cancer.) | (Serbia) Aleksandar Đorđević | (Italy) Pietro Aradori | Macron | Segafredo Zanetti |
| Sidigas Avellino | (Italy) Giuseppe Sampietro | (Italy) Massimo Maffezzoli | (Italy) Ariel Filloy | Joma | Sidigas, Citroën |
| Umana Reyer Venezia | (Italy) Luigi Brugnaro | (Italy) Walter De Raffaele | (Georgia (country)) MarQuez Haynes | Erreà | Umana |
| Vanoli Cremona | (Italy) Aldo Vanoli | (Italy) Romeo Sacchetti | (Italy) Giulio Gazzotti | Erreà | Ferramenta Vanoli |
| VL Pesaro | (Italy) Ario Costa | (Italy) Matteo Boniciolli | (Italy) Andrea Ancellotti | Erreà | Consultinvest, ButanGas |

=== Managerial changes ===
| Team | Outgoing manager | Manner of departure | Date of vacancy | Position in table | Replaced by | Date of appointment |
|---|---|---|---|---|---|---|
| Grissin Bon Reggio Emilia | (Italy) Massimiliano Menetti | Sacked | 17 May 2018 | Pre-season | (Italy) Devis Cagnardi | 23 May 2018 |
| OriOra Pistoia | (Italy) Vincenzo Esposito | Signed with Banco di Sardegna Sassari | 19 May 2018 | Pre-season | (Italy) Alessandro Ramagli | 12 June 2018 |
| Banco di Sardegna Sassari | (North Macedonia) Zare Markovski | Mutual consent | 22 May 2018 | Pre-season | (Italy) Vincenzo Esposito | 22 May 2018 |
| Segafredo Virtus Bologna | (Italy) Alessandro Ramagli | Sacked | 25 May 2018 | Pre-season | (Italy) Stefano Sacripanti | 12 June 2018 |
| Red October Cantù | (Italy) Marco Sodini | Resigned | 29 May 2018 | Pre-season | (Russia) Evgeniy Pashutin | 7 June 2018 |
| Sidigas Avellino | (Italy) Stefano Sacripanti | Sacked | 1 June 2018 | Pre-season | (Serbia) Nenad Vučinić | 12 June 2018 |
| Fiat Torino | (Italy) Paolo Galbiati | Resigned | 7 June 2018 | Pre-season | (United States) Larry Brown | 17 June 2018 |
| Fiat Torino | (United States) Larry Brown | Mutual consent | 27 December 2018 | 12th (4–8) | (Italy) Paolo Galbiati | 28 December 2018 |
| VL Pesaro | (Italy) Massimo Galli | Sacked | 8 January 2019 | 15th (4–10) | (Italy) Matteo Boniciolli | 8 January 2019 |
| Red October Cantù | (Russia) Evgeniy Pashutin | Signed with Avtodor Saratov | 30 January 2019 | 11th (7–10) | (Italy) Nicola Brienza | 30 January 2019 |
| Grissin Bon Reggio Emilia | (Italy) Devis Cagnardi | Sacked | 4 February 2019 | 15th (5–13) | (Italy) Stefano Pillastrini | 5 February 2019 |
| Banco di Sardegna Sassari | (Italy) Vincenzo Esposito | Resigned | 11 February 2019 | 8th (9–10) | (Italy) Gianmarco Pozzecco | 11 February 2019 |
| Segafredo Virtus Bologna | (Italy) Stefano Sacripanti | Sacked | 11 March 2019 | 10th (10–11) | (Serbia) Aleksandar Đorđević | 11 March 2019 |
| OriOra Pistoia | (Italy) Alessandro Ramagli | Sacked | 28 March 2019 | 16th (5–18) | (Italy) Fabio Bongi (interim) | 28 March 2019 |
| OriOra Pistoia | (Italy) Fabio Bongi | End of interim spell | 31 March 2019 | 16th (5–19) | (Italy) Paolo Moretti | 2 April 2019 |
| Sidigas Avellino | (Serbia) Nenad Vučinić | Mutual consent | 10 April 2019 | 7th (14–11) | (Italy) Massimo Maffezzoli | 10 April 2019 |

== Changes from 2017–18 ==
As in previous seasons, LBA clubs must play in arenas that seat at least 3,500 people. From 2017–18 season, all clubs must host their home playoffs matches in arenas with a seating capacity of at least 5,000 people.

== Rules ==
Each team is allowed either five or seven foreign players under two formulas:

1. 5 foreigners from countries outside the European Union
2. 3 foreigners from countries outside the EU, 4 foreigners from EU countries (also including those from countries signatory of the Cotonou Agreement)

Each club can choose the 5+5 formula, that consists of five Italian players and five foreign players, and the 3+4+5 formula, with five Italian players, three foreigners from countries outside the EU and four foreigners from EU countries or "Cotonou Countries".

At the end of the season there will be a prize of €500.000,00 for the top three ranked teams, that had chosen the 5+5 formula, considering the playing time of Italian players, and €200.000,00 for those teams that will obtain the best results with their youth sector.

== Regular season ==
In the regular season, teams played against each other home-and-away in a round-robin format. The eight first qualified teams advanced to the Playoffs, the last seven qualified teams were eliminated, while the last one qualified team was relegated and replaced by the winner of the playoffs of the second-level Serie A2 Basket. The matchdays were from October 7, 2018, to May 2019.

=== League table ===
| Pos | Team | Pld | W | L | PF | PA | PD | Pts | Qualification or relegation |
|---|---|---|---|---|---|---|---|---|---|
| 1 | AX Armani Exchange Milano | 30 | 23 | 7 | 2609 | 2391 | +218 | 46 | Qualification to Playoffs |
| 2 | Vanoli Cremona | 30 | 20 | 10 | 2504 | 2360 | +144 | 40 | Qualification to Playoffs |
| 3 | Umana Reyer Venezia | 30 | 20 | 10 | 2440 | 2256 | +184 | 40 | Qualification to Playoffs |
| 4 | Banco di Sardegna Sassari | 30 | 18 | 12 | 2593 | 2436 | +157 | 36 | Qualification to Playoffs |
| 5 | New Basket Brindisi | 30 | 18 | 12 | 2454 | 2370 | +84 | 36 | Qualification to Playoffs |
| 6 | Dolomiti Energia Trento | 30 | 17 | 13 | 2383 | 2410 | −27 | 34 | Qualification to Playoffs |
| 7 | Alma Pallacanestro Trieste | 30 | 16 | 14 | 2634 | 2527 | +107 | 32 | Qualification to Playoffs |
| 8 | Sidigas Avellino | 30 | 16 | 14 | 2470 | 2456 | +14 | 32 | Qualification to Playoffs |
| 9 | Openjobmetis Varese | 30 | 16 | 14 | 2385 | 2284 | +101 | 32 | |
| 10 | Red October Cantù | 30 | 16 | 14 | 2526 | 2571 | −45 | 32 | |
| 11 | Segafredo Virtus Bologna | 30 | 15 | 15 | 2387 | 2410 | −23 | 30 | |
| 12 | Germani Basket Brescia | 30 | 14 | 16 | 2408 | 2443 | −35 | 28 | |
| 13 | Grissin Bon Reggio Emilia | 30 | 9 | 21 | 2363 | 2493 | −130 | 18 | |
| 14 | VL Pesaro | 30 | 7 | 23 | 2382 | 2754 | −372 | 14 | |
| 15 | OriOra Pistoia | 30 | 6 | 24 | 2253 | 2511 | −258 | 12 | |
| 16 | Fiat Torino (Note: Fiat Torino were deducted 8 points by the Federal Council due to financial irregularities.) (R) | 30 | 9 | 21 | 2492 | 2611 | −119 | 10 | Relegation to Serie A2 |

Source: LBA
(R) Relegated

=== Positions by round ===
The table lists the positions of teams after completion of each round. In order to preserve chronological evolvements, any postponed matches are not included in the round at which they were originally scheduled, but added to the full round they were played immediately afterwards. For example, if a match is scheduled for round 13, but then postponed and played between rounds 16 and 17, it will be added to the standings for round 16.

| Team \ Round | 1 | 2 | 3 | 4 | 5 | 6 | 7 | 8 | 9 | 10 | 11 | 12 | 13 | 14 | 15 | 16 | 17 | 18 | 19 | 20 | 21 | 22 | 23 | 24 | 25 | 26 | 27 | 28 | 29 | 30 |
|---|---|---|---|---|---|---|---|---|---|---|---|---|---|---|---|---|---|---|---|---|---|---|---|---|---|---|---|---|---|---|
| AX Armani Exchange Milano | 2 | 2 | 2 | 2 | 2 | 2 | 1 | 1 | 1 | 1 | 1 | 1 | 1 | 1 | 1 | 1 | 1 | 1 | 1 | 1 | 1 | 1 | 1 | 1 | 1 | 1 | 1 | 1 | 1 | 1 |
| Vanoli Cremona | 5 | 3 | 8 | 5 | 3 | 3 | 3 | 4 | 3 | 4 | 3 | 3 | 4 | 5 | 4 | 4 | 3 | 3 | 3 | 3 | 3 | 3 | 3 | 3 | 3 | 3 | 3 | 3 | 2 | 2 |
| Umana Reyer Venezia | 7 | 1 | 1 | 1 | 1 | 1 | 2 | 2 | 2 | 2 | 2 | 2 | 3 | 2 | 3 | 2 | 2 | 2 | 2 | 2 | 2 | 2 | 2 | 2 | 2 | 2 | 2 | 2 | 3 | 3 |
| Banco di Sardegna Sassari | 14 | 8 | 4 | 3 | 4 | 6 | 9 | 10 | 8 | 10 | 11 | 11 | 9 | 6 | 6 | 5 | 7 | 8 | 8 | 11 | 11 | 11 | 11 | 9 | 9 | 8 | 7 | 5 | 5 | 4 |
| New Basket Brindisi | 15 | 5 | 9 | 8 | 6 | 5 | 4 | 6 | 6 | 7 | 7 | 7 | 6 | 7 | 7 | 8 | 6 | 5 | 5 | 6 | 5 | 6 | 5 | 5 | 4 | 4 | 4 | 4 | 4 | 5 |
| Dolomiti Energia Trento | 12 | 15 | 15 | 15 | 15 | 15 | 15 | 15 | 16 | 15 | 10 | 9 | 8 | 10 | 10 | 10 | 12 | 12 | 11 | 10 | 9 | 8 | 10 | 8 | 8 | 6 | 6 | 6 | 9 | 6 |
| Alma Pallacanestro Trieste | 11 | 14 | 10 | 11 | 12 | 13 | 11 | 9 | 10 | 8 | 6 | 6 | 7 | 9 | 9 | 9 | 9 | 9 | 9 | 8 | 7 | 10 | 8 | 7 | 5 | 5 | 5 | 7 | 7 | 7 |
| Sidigas Avellino | 1 | 4 | 12 | 10 | 5 | 4 | 5 | 5 | 5 | 5 | 5 | 5 | 5 | 3 | 2 | 3 | 4 | 4 | 4 | 4 | 4 | 4 | 4 | 4 | 7 | 7 | 8 | 8 | 10 | 8 |
| Openjobmetis Varese | 8 | 11 | 7 | 6 | 7 | 8 | 6 | 3 | 4 | 3 | 4 | 4 | 2 | 4 | 5 | 6 | 5 | 7 | 6 | 5 | 6 | 5 | 6 | 6 | 6 | 9 | 9 | 10 | 6 | 9 |
| Red October Cantù | 16 | 12 | 3 | 4 | 8 | 9 | 10 | 12 | 13 | 13 | 14 | 14 | 14 | 12 | 14 | 13 | 11 | 10 | 10 | 9 | 8 | 7 | 9 | 12 | 10 | 10 | 10 | 9 | 8 | 10 |
| Segafredo Virtus Bologna | 6 | 10 | 6 | 7 | 10 | 7 | 7 | 8 | 9 | 6 | 9 | 8 | 10 | 8 | 8 | 7 | 8 | 6 | 7 | 7 | 10 | 9 | 7 | 10 | 11 | 11 | 11 | 11 | 11 | 11 |
| Germani Basket Brescia | 9 | 9 | 11 | 12 | 11 | 11 | 12 | 11 | 12 | 9 | 8 | 10 | 11 | 11 | 11 | 11 | 10 | 11 | 12 | 12 | 12 | 12 | 12 | 11 | 12 | 12 | 12 | 12 | 12 | 12 |
| Grissin Bon Reggio Emilia | 3 | 7 | 13 | 14 | 13 | 14 | 14 | 16 | 15 | 16 | 16 | 16 | 15 | 13 | 12 | 14 | 14 | 16 | 16 | 16 | 16 | 16 | 15 | 13 | 15 | 14 | 14 | 14 | 13 | 13 |
| VL Pesaro | 4 | 13 | 14 | 13 | 14 | 12 | 8 | 7 | 7 | 11 | 13 | 13 | 13 | 15 | 13 | 12 | 13 | 13 | 13 | 13 | 13 | 13 | 14 | 14 | 14 | 15 | 15 | 15 | 14 | 14 |
| OriOra Pistoia | 13 | 16 | 16 | 16 | 16 | 16 | 16 | 14 | 11 | 14 | 15 | 15 | 16 | 16 | 16 | 16 | 16 | 15 | 15 | 15 | 15 | 15 | 16 | 16 | 16 | 16 | 16 | 16 | 15 | 15 |
| Fiat Torino | 10 | 6 | 5 | 9 | 9 | 10 | 13 | 13 | 14 | 12 | 12 | 12 | 12 | 14 | 15 | 15 | 15 | 14 | 14 | 14 | 14 | 14 | 13 | 15 | 13 | 13 | 13 | 13 | 16 | 16 |

Updated to match(es) played on May 12, 2019. Source: LBA

| Leader of the Regular Season |
| Qualification to Playoffs |
| Relegation to Serie A2 |

=== Results ===
| Home \ Away | TRI | AXM | SAS | TRE | TOR | BRE | REG | BRI | VAR | PIS | CTU | BOL | AVE | VEN | CRE | PES |
|---|---|---|---|---|---|---|---|---|---|---|---|---|---|---|---|---|
| Alma Pallacanestro Trieste | — | 73–77 | 65–86 | 85–74 | 115–110 | 90–86 | 104–88 | 71–92 | 96–104 | 96–79 | 102–82 | 88–92 | 110–64 | 104–85 | 97–80 | 105–68 |
| AX Armani Exchange Milano | 93–88 | — | 79–93 | 86–78 | 110–91 | 87–75 | 100–75 | 103–92 | 72–67 | 107–83 | 98–91 | 94–75 | 85–79 | 86–87 | 76–75 | 111–74 |
| Banco di Sardegna Sassari | 102–97 | 106–107 | — | 88–70 | 96–82 | 95–87 | 82–71 | 98–103 | 71–60 | 111–113 | 87–81 | 90–72 | 105–84 | 83–86 | 0–20^{b} | 114–73 |
| Dolomiti Energia Trento | 82–75 | 77–79 | 71–66 | — | 95–87 | 76–75 | 68–60 | 76–79 | 74–71 | 82–73 | 92–97 | 71–65 | 97–79 | 64–87 | 99–104 | 81–76 |
| Fiat Torino | 86–74 | 71–93 | 102–83 | 86–84 | — | 89–91 | 77–58 | 66–72 | 72–66 | 86–80 | 96–106 | 64–80 | 79–96 | 66–73 | 88–94 | 93–71 |
| Germani Basket Brescia | 77–85 | 92–86 | 71–95 | 79–84 | 83–76 | — | 83–79 | 97–80 | 78–73 | 87–79 | 81–63 | 77–75 | 74–77 | 72–70 | 86–89 | 84–81 |
| Grissin Bon Reggio Emilia | 71–84 | 67–71 | 85–77 | 80–84 | 85–98 | 79–82 | — | 82–76 | 74–68 | 82–84 | 89–99 | 81–89 | 75–91 | 82–74 | 82–81 | 108–66 |
| New Basket Brindisi | 85–77 | 101–92 | 84–90 | 76–81 | 96–89 | 72–65 | 67–75 | — | 81–77 | 80–70 | 76–59 | 89–81 | 68–70 | 71–65 | 80–86 | 88–73 |
| Openjobmetis Varese | 78–66 | 84–94 | 84–73 | 93–85 | 77–60 | 81–80 | 92–80 | 85–67 | — | 98–70 | 89–71 | 79–86 | 79–83 | 87–79 | 83–64 | 81–75 |
| OriOra Pistoia | 77–90 | 20–0^{a} | 82–90 | 70–78 | 78–81 | 73–70 | 76–80 | 74–90 | 71–65 | — | 74–84 | 71–81 | 73–88 | 69–97 | 73–90 | 77–81 |
| Red October Cantù | 66–88 | 74–101 | 88–97 | 84–72 | 86–75 | 82–76 | 101–95 | 81–79 | 84–75 | 100–79 | — | 96–94 | 83–73 | 71–93 | 82–66 | 87–90 |
| Segafredo Virtus Bologna | 82–74 | 79–88 | 74–86 | 74–69 | 82–79 | 88–80 | 81–69 | 61–77 | 84–72 | 67–78 | 90–81 | — | 88–66 | 76–77 | 66–84 | 78–70 |
| Sidigas Avellino | 96–97 | 85–81 | 86–78 | 110–72 | 109–82 | 79–67 | 91–59 | 83–87 | 76–71 | 82–78 | 98–81 | 90–96 | — | 49–79 | 62–70 | 82–81 |
| Umana Reyer Venezia | 75–83 | 81–84 | 98–90 | 77–81 | 76–75 | 86–70 | 76–71 | 70–59 | 61–66 | 95–72 | 94–90 | 94–75 | 76–65 | — | 78–67 | 97–62 |
| Vanoli Cremona | 87–78 | 76–72 | 80–73 | 84–89 | 100–87 | 88–91 | 98–81 | 93–86 | 79–82 | 90–80 | 79–96 | 87–70 | 94–88 | 80–65 | — | 97–64 |
| VL Pesaro | 103–77 | 82–97 | 81–88 | 65–77 | 102–98 | 86–92 | 73–100 | 80–101 | 78–98 | 83–77 | 72–80 | 89–86 | 91–89 | 86–89 | 106–122 | — |

Source: LBA
Legend: Blue = home team win; Red = away team win.
Matches with lighter background shading were decided after overtime.

Notes
^a AX Armani Exchange Milano won the game on the road 91-81, but OriOra Pistoia awarded 20-0 win over Milano due to playing James Nunnally while he was under suspension.
^b Vanoli Cremona won the game on the road 105-100 after an overtime, but awarded 20-0 win over Banco di Sardegna Sassari due to coaching Gianmarco Pozzecco while he was under suspension.

== Statistical leaders ==
As of May 12, 2019.

=== Points ===
| Rank | Name | Team | PPG |
|---|---|---|---|
| 1. | (United States) Frank Gaines | Red October Cantù | 20.3 |
| 2. | (United States) Blackmon Jr. | VL Pesaro | 19.7 |
| 3. | (United States) Erik McCree | VL Pesaro | 18.5 |
| 4. | (United States) Davon Jefferson | Red October Cantù | 18.0 |
| 5. | (Serbia) Aleksa Avramović | Openjobmetis Varese | 17.7 |

=== Assists ===
| Rank | Name | Team | APG |
|---|---|---|---|
| 1. | (Italy) Luca Vitali | Germani Basket Brescia | 5.8 |
| 2. | (United States) Mike James | AX Armani Exchange Milano | 5.1 |
| 3. | (United States) Chris Wright | Alma Pallacanestro Trieste | 4.9 |
| 4. | (United States) Tony Taylor | Segafredo Virtus Bologna | 4.8 |
| 5. | (United States) Jaime Smith | Banco di Sardegna Sassari | 4.5 |

=== Rebounds ===
| Rank | Name | Team | RPG |
|---|---|---|---|
| 1. | (Lithuania) Egidijus Mockevičius | VL Pesaro | 11.5 |
| 2. | (United States) Tyler Cain | Openjobmetis Varese | 10.8 |
| 3. | (United States) Ousman Krubally | OriOra Pistoia | 10.1 |
| 4. | (Australia) Mangok Mathiang | Vanoli Cremona | 9.7 |
| 5. | (United States) Jack Cooley | Banco di Sardegna Sassari | 9.0 |

=== Valuation ===
| Rank | Name | Team | VPG |
|---|---|---|---|
| 1. | (United States) Davon Jefferson | Red October Cantù | 23.5 |
| 2. | (United States) Caleb Green | Sidigas Avellino | 21.9 |
| 3. | (Nigeria) Ike Udanoh | Sidigas Avellino | 20.0 |
| 4. | (Lithuania) Egidijus Mockevičius | VL Pesaro | 19.4 |
| 5. | (United States) Tyler Cain | Openjobmetis Varese | 19.4 |

=== Other Statistics ===
| Category | Player | Team | Average |
|---|---|---|---|
| Steals | (United States) Aaron Craft | Dolomiti Energia Trento | 2.0 |
| Blocks | (Senegal) Hamady N'Diaye | Sidigas Avellino | 1.8 |
| Turnovers | (United States) Tony Mitchell | OriOra Pistoia | 2.9 |
| Turnovers | (United States) Caleb Green | Sidigas Avellino | 2.9 |
| 2P% | (United States) Mitchell Watt | Umana Reyer Venezia | 70.1% |
| 3P% | (Argentina) Juan Fernández | Alma Pallacanestro Trieste | 48.3% |
| FT% | (United States) James Blackmon | VL Pesaro | 89.9% |

=== Individual game highs ===
| Category | Player | Team | Total | Opponent |
|---|---|---|---|---|
| Points | (United States) Frank Gaines | Red October Cantù | 44 | AX Armani Exchange Milano (Mar 31, 19) |
| Rebounds | (Lithuania) Egidijus Mockevičius | VL Pesaro | 21 | Fiat Torino (Jan 13, 19) |
| Assists | (United States) Mike James | AX Armani Exchange Milano | 15 | Banco di Sardegna Sassari (Dec 16, 18) |
| Steals | (United States) Dominic Artis | VL Pesaro | 9 | Fiat Torino (Jan 13, 19) |
| Blocks | (Senegal) Hamady N'Diaye | Sidigas Avellino | 5 | Red October Cantù (Oct 6, 18) |
| Blocks | (United States) John Brown | New Basket Brindisi | 5 | Dolomiti Energia Trento (Jan 13, 19) |
| Blocks | (Italy) Andrea Ancellotti | VL Pesaro | 5 | Dolomiti Energia Trento (Apr 14, 19) |
| Three Pointers | (United States) Jordan Hamilton | Germani Basket Brescia | 11 | Fiat Torino (Mar 24, 19) |

Source: RealGM

== Awards ==
=== Finals MVP ===
- (United States) Austin Daye (Umana Reyer Venezia)

=== Most Valuable Player ===
- (United States) Drew Crawford (Vanoli Cremona)

=== Best Player Under 22 ===
- (United States) Tony Carr (Red October Cantù)

=== Best Coach ===
- (Italy) Romeo Sacchetti (Vanoli Cremona)

=== Best Executive ===
- (Italy) Simone Giofré (New Basket Brindisi)

=== Round MVP ===
| Round | Player | Team | PIR | Ref |
|---|---|---|---|---|
| 1 | (United States) Caleb Green | Sidigas Avellino | 32 | |
| 2 | (Nigeria) Ike Udanoh | Red October Cantù | 40 | |
| 3 | (United States) Davon Jefferson | Red October Cantù | 29 | |
| 4 | (United States) Tony Mitchell | Red October Cantù | 28 | |
| 5 | (United States) Caleb Green (2) | Sidigas Avellino | 34 | |
| 6 | (United States) Erik McCree | VL Pesaro | 33 | |
| 7 | (United States) L. J. Peak | OriOra Pistoia | 37 | |
| 8 | (Canada) Thomas Scrubb | Openjobmetis Varese | 28 | |
| 9 | (Kosovo) Scott Bamforth | Banco di Sardegna Sassari | 29 | |
| 10 | (United States) Mitchell Watt | Umana Reyer Venezia | 31 | |
| 11 | (United States) Mike James | AX Armani Exchange Milano | 33 | |
| 12 | (Canada) Thomas Scrubb (2) | Openjobmetis Varese | 33 | |
| 13 | (United States) Davon Jefferson (2) | Red October Cantù | 45 | |
| 14 | (United States) Jack Cooley | Banco di Sardegna Sassari | 32 | |
| 15 | (Kosovo) Scott Bamforth (2) | Banco di Sardegna Sassari | 35 | |
| 16 | (United States) Adrian Banks | New Basket Brindisi | 30 | |
| 17 | (United States) Davon Jefferson (3) | Red October Cantù | 27 | |
| 18 | (United States) Davon Jefferson (4) | Red October Cantù | 34 | |
| 19 | (United States) Frank Gaines | Red October Cantù | 41 | |
| 20 | (United States) Tyler Cain | Openjobmetis Varese | 29 | |
| 21 | (United States) Julyan Stone | Umana Reyer Venezia | 30 | |
| 21 | (United States) Davon Jefferson | Red October Cantù | 30 | |
| 22 | (Canada) Dyshawn Pierre | Banco di Sardegna Sassari | 35 | |
| 22 | (United States) Keifer Sykes | Sidigas Avellino | 35 | |
| 23 | (United States) Mitchell Watt (2) | Umana Reyer Venezia | 33 | |
| 24 | (United States) Mike James (2) | AX Armani Exchange Milano | 31 | |
| 25 | (The Gambia) Ousman Krubally | OriOra Pistoia | 43 | |
| 26 | (United States) Jeremy Chappell | New Basket Brindisi | 38 | |
| 27 | (United States) Davon Jefferson (2) | Red October Cantù | 32 | |
| 28 | (Italy) Riccardo Moraschini | New Basket Brindisi | 38 | |
| 29 | (Israel) Adrian Banks | New Basket Brindisi | 33 | |
| 30 | (United States) Dustin Hogue | Dolomiti Energia Trento | 29 | |

== Playoffs ==
The LBA playoffs quarterfinals and semifinals were best of five formats, while the finals series were best of seven format. The playoffs began on May 18, 2019, and finished on June 22, 2019.

Quarterfinals
1 | AX Armani Exchange Milano | 3
8 | Sidigas Avellino | 2
4 | Banco di Sardegna Sassari | 3
5 | New Basket Brindisi | 0
2 | Vanoli Cremona | 3
7 | Alma Pallacanestro Trieste | 1
3 | Umana Reyer Venezia | 3
6 | Dolomiti Energia Trento | 2

Semifinals
1 | AX Armani Exchange Milano | 0
4 | Banco di Sardegna Sassari | 3
2 | Vanoli Cremona | 2
3 | Umana Reyer Venezia | 3

Finals
4 | Banco di Sardegna Sassari | 3
3 | Umana Reyer Venezia | 4

== Final standings ==
| Pos | Team | Pld | W | L | Qualification or relegation |
|---|---|---|---|---|---|
| 1 | Umana Reyer Venezia (C) | 30 | 20 | 10 | Qualification to EuroCup |
| 2 | Banco di Sardegna Sassari | 30 | 18 | 12 | Qualification to Champions League |
| 3 | AX Armani Exchange Milano | 30 | 23 | 7 | Already qualified to EuroLeague |
| 4 | Vanoli Cremona | 30 | 20 | 10 | |
| 5 | New Basket Brindisi | 30 | 18 | 12 | Qualification to Champions League |
| 6 | Dolomiti Energia Trento | 30 | 17 | 13 | Qualification to EuroCup |
| 7 | Alma Pallacanestro Trieste | 30 | 16 | 14 | |
| 8 | Sidigas Avellino | 30 | 16 | 14 | |
| 9 | Openjobmetis Varese | 30 | 16 | 14 | |
| 10 | Red October Cantù | 30 | 16 | 14 | |
| 11 | Segafredo Virtus Bologna (Note: Segafredo Virtus Bologna qualified to EuroCup through a wild card.) | 30 | 15 | 15 | Qualification to EuroCup |
| 12 | Germani Basket Brescia (Note: Germani Basket Brescia qualified to EuroCup through a wild card.) | 30 | 14 | 16 | Qualification to EuroCup |
| 13 | Grissin Bon Reggio Emilia | 30 | 9 | 21 | |
| 14 | VL Pesaro | 30 | 7 | 23 | |
| 15 | OriOra Pistoia | 30 | 6 | 24 | |
| 16 | Fiat Torino | 30 | 9 | 21 | Relegation to Serie A2 |

Source: LBA
(C) Champions

== Serie A clubs in European competitions ==
| Team | Competition | Progress | Ref |
|---|---|---|---|
| AX Armani Exchange Milano | EuroLeague | 12th (14–16) | |
| Germani Basket Brescia | EuroCup | Regular season | |
| Dolomiti Energia Trento | EuroCup | Regular season | |
| Fiat Torino | EuroCup | Regular season | |
| Red October Cantù | Champions League | Second qualifying round | |
| Segafredo Virtus Bologna | Champions League | Champions | |
| Sidigas Avellino | Champions League | Regular season | |
| Umana Reyer Venezia | Champions League | Round of 16 | |
| Banco di Sardegna Sassari | FIBA Europe Cup | Champions | |
| Openjobmetis Varese | FIBA Europe Cup | Semi-finals | |

== Supercup ==
The 2018 Italian Supercup, also known as Zurich Connect Supercoppa 2018 for sponsorship reasons, was the 24th edition of the super cup tournament of the Italian basketball. The Supercup opened the 2018–19 season on 29 and 30 September 2018, and it was contested in the PalaLeonessa in Brescia.

Qualified for the tournament were Fiat Torino and Germani Brescia, as Italian Cup finalists, AX Armani Exchange Milano and Dolomiti Energia Trento as LBA Playoffs finalist.

AX Armani Exchange Milano beat the tournament host Germani Basket Brescia 59–81, while Fiat Torino beat Dolomiti Energia Trento 81–72.

AX Armani Exchange Milano was the Supercup winner for the third consecutive season after beating Fiat Torino in the final 82–71. Milano used an 11–0 run to start the second quarter and jump in front. Milano held a 41–31 lead at halftime, then Vladimir Micov nailed three triples early in the third quarter to open a 55–38 lead. Torino closed in with a 0–12 run in the fourth quarter, but Artūras Gudaitis had a three-point play to extend it to 76–67, and sending Milano on its way to victory. Micov and Gudaitis scored 17 points apiece to lead Milano to its first trophy of the season. Nemanja Nedović scored 14, and Mike James had 10 in a victory. Tony Carr paced Torino with 15 points, while Tekele Cotton, Tyshawn Taylor and Jamil Wilson scored 11 apiece.

Vladimir Micov was named MVP of the competition.

== Cup ==
The 51st edition of the Italian Cup, knows as the PosteMobile Final Eight for sponsorship reasons, was contested in February 2019. As in the previous edition, Nelson Mandela Forum in Florence hosted the Cup. Eight teams qualified for the Final Eight were Avellino, Bologna, Brindisi, Cremona, Milano, Sassari, Varese and Venezia.

Fiat Torino were the defending champions.

Segafredo Virtus Bologna stunned AX Armani Exchange Milano 84-86 and Vanoli Cremona defeated Openjobmetis Varese 82–73 in the Italian Cup quarterfinals on Thursday. The game was not as close as the final score would indicate with Bologna leading by multiple possessions throughout the fourth quarter and Milano only getting within 2 on a Curtis Jerrells triple on the buzzer. Tony Taylor scored 23 points and Pietro Aradori 16 for Bologna, which took a big step towards adding to its record eight Italian Cup triumphs. James Nunnally paced Milano with 19 points while leading scorer Mike James shot just 1 for 11 on three-pointers and finished with 13 points. For Cremona, Drew Crawford scored 22 points and Wesley Saunders added 20.

On the second night of the Italian Cup quarterfinals, Banco di Sardegna Sassari edged Umana Reyer Venezia 88–89 behind 24 points from Dyshawn Pierre and New Basket Brindisi out-gunned Sidigas Avellino 95–98 as Adrian Banks poured in 26 points.

Vanoli Cremona will play New Basket Brindisi in the final of the Italian Cup. In the semifinals, Cremona topped Segafredo Virtus Bologna 102–91 as Travis Diener netted 26 points on 6-for-9 three-point shooting. Mangok Mathiang added 19 points and 10 rebounds in the victory. Brindisi held off Sassari 86–87, with John Brown scoring 20 points, and Jeremy Chappell collecting 18 points plus 9 rebounds.

Vanoli Cremona lifted the Italian Cup for the first time after beating New Basket Brindisi 83–74 in the final. Wesley Saunders posted 18 points and 9 rebounds and Drew Crawford also scored 18 to lead the winners. Michele Ruzzier added 12 points off the bench. Cremona used a 9-0 second-quarter run to surge ahead from a 25–25 tie and led 45–37 at halftime. The lead stood in double figures for most of the second half and Brindisi never got closer than 6. John Brown posted 21 points and 8 rebounds and Tony Gaffney scored 19 in defeat. Drew Crawford was named Panasonic MVP of the competition.
