= 2019 Italian Basketball Supercup =

2019 Zurich Connect Supercoppa
Tournament details
- Arena: PalaFlorio; Bari, Italy
- Dates: 21 September 2019–22 September 2019

Final positions
- Champions: Banco di Sardegna Sassari (3rd title)
- Runners-up: Umana Reyer Venezia

Awards and statistics
- MVP: (United States) Curtis Jerrells

The 2019 Italian Basketball Supercup (Italian: Supercoppa di pallacanestro 2018), also known as Zurich Connect Supercoppa 2019 for sponsorship reasons, was the 25th edition of the super cup tournament, organized by the Lega Basket Serie A (LBA).

AX Armani Exchange Milano were the defending champions.

Banco di Sardegna Sassari went to win his 2nd Supercup by beating Umana Reyer Venezia 83–80 in the Finals. Curtis Jerrells was named MVP of the competition.

It was played at the PalaFlorio arena in Bari on 21 and 22 September 2019.

== Participant teams ==
Qualified for the tournament were Vanoli Cremona and New Basket Brindisi, as Italian Cup finalists, Banco di Sardegna Sassari and Umana Reyer Venezia as LBA Playoffs finalist.

Team	Qualified as	Appearances
Vanoli Cremona	Italian Cup champion	2nd
New Basket Brindisi	Italian Cup runner-up	2nd
Banco di Sardegna Sassari	LBA Playoffs runner-up	4th
Umana Reyer Venezia	LBA Playoffs champion	2nd

== Bracket ==
Semifinals; 21 September
1	Umana Reyer Venezia	78
4	New Basket Brindisi	73
2	Banco di Sardegna Sassari	101
3	Vanoli Cremona	94

Final; 22 September
1	Umana Reyer Venezia	80
2	Banco di Sardegna Sassari	83

== Semifinals ==
=== Vanoli Cremona vs. Banco di Sardegna Sassari ===
21 September 2019	Vanoli Cremona	94–101(OT)	Banco di Sardegna Sassari	Bari
18:00 (CEST)	Scoring by quarter: 21–16, 28–30, 20–20, 18–21, Overtime: 7–14
Eurosport	Pts: Matthew Tiby 25; Rebs: Saunders 6 Asts: Diener 5 PIR: Matthew Tiby, Diener 20	Boxscore	Pts: Evans 18; Rebs: McLean, Evans 9 Asts: Spissu 7 PIR: Evans, Spissu 25	Arena: PalaFlorio

=== Umana Reyer Venezia vs. Happy Casa Brindisi ===
21 September 2019	Umana Reyer Venezia	78–73	New Basket Brindisi	Bari
20:45 (CEST)	Scoring by quarter: 6–19, 17–14, 31–11, 24–29
Eurosport	Pts: Daye 26; Rebs: Bramos, Watt 5 Asts: Daye 4	Boxscore	Pts: Banks 23; Rebs: Radivojević 8 Asts: Martin 3	Arena: PalaFlorio

== Final ==
=== Banco di Sardegna Sassari vs. Umana Reyer Venezia ===
22 September 2019	Banco di Sardegna Sassari	83–80(OT)	Umana Reyer Venezia	Bari
20:30	Scoring by quarter: 22–11, 19–13, 17–24, 11–21, Overtime: 14–11
Eurosport	Pts: Jerrells 19; Rebs: Evans 8 Asts: three players 3 PIR: McLean 21	Boxscore	Pts: Chappell 19; Rebs: Bramos, Watt 7 Asts: Chappell, Stone 3 PIR: Chappell 21	Arena: PalaFlorio

== Sponsors ==
- Zurich Connect (title sponsor)
- Panasonic (main sponsor and timekeeper)
- Fastweb (technology partner)
- Snaipay (platinum sponsor)
- IBSA (gold sponsor)
- Erreà (technical sponsor)
- Molten (official ball)
- Prozis (official nutrition)
- Airness (official store)
- Franciacorta (official wine partner)
- Viva Ticket (official ticketing provider)
- Sixtus Italia (official supplier)
- Wintecare (official supplier)
- Acqua S.Bernardo (official water)
- Anthea Risk Management (official broker)
- Giorgio Tesi Group (official green partner)
- Eurosport (official broadcaster)
- Telenorba (local media partner)
- Aeroporti di Puglia (official partner)

Source: LBA
