= 2019 LBA Playoffs =

Tournament details
- Country: Italy
- Dates: 18 May–22 June 2019
- Teams: 8
- Defending champions: AX Armani Exchange Milano

Final positions
- Champions: Umana Reyer Venezia
- Runners-up: Banco di Sardegna Sassari
- Semifinalists: AX Armani Exchange Milano; Vanoli Cremona

Tournament statistics
- Matches played: 26

The 2019 LBA Playoffs, officially known as the 2019 LBA Playoff PosteMobile, was the postseason tournament of the 2018–19 LBA season, which began on 7 October 2018. The Playoffs started on May 18, 2019, and finished in June 2019, with the Finals.

AX Armani Exchange Milano were the defending champions.

Umana Reyer Venezia won their 4th title by beating Banco di Sardegna Sassari in game 7 of the finals.

== Qualified teams ==
The eight first qualified teams after the end of the regular season were qualified to the playoffs.

| Pos | Team | Pld | W | L | PF | PA | PD | Qualification |
|---|---|---|---|---|---|---|---|---|
| 1 | AX Armani Exchange Milano | 30 | 23 | 7 | 2609 | 2391 | +218 | Seeded teams |
| 2 | Vanoli Cremona | 30 | 20 | 10 | 2504 | 2360 | +144 | Seeded teams |
| 3 | Umana Reyer Venezia | 30 | 20 | 10 | 2440 | 2256 | +184 | Seeded teams |
| 4 | Banco di Sardegna Sassari | 30 | 18 | 12 | 2593 | 2436 | +157 | Seeded teams |
| 5 | New Basket Brindisi | 30 | 18 | 12 | 2454 | 2370 | +84 | Non-seeded teams |
| 6 | Aquila Basket Trento | 30 | 17 | 13 | 2383 | 2410 | −27 | Non-seeded teams |
| 7 | Alma Pallacanestro Trieste | 30 | 16 | 14 | 2634 | 2527 | +107 | Non-seeded teams |
| 8 | Sidigas Avellino | 30 | 16 | 14 | 2470 | 2456 | +14 | Non-seeded teams |

Source: Legabasket

== Bracket ==
Quarterfinals
1 | AX Armani Exchange Milano | 3
8 | Sidigas Avellino | 2
4 | Banco di Sardegna Sassari | 3
5 | New Basket Brindisi | 0
2 | Vanoli Cremona | 3
7 | Alma Pallacanestro Trieste | 1
3 | Umana Reyer Venezia | 3
6 | Dolomiti Energia Trento | 2

Semifinals
1 | AX Armani Exchange Milano | 0
4 | Banco di Sardegna Sassari | 3
2 | Vanoli Cremona | 2
3 | Umana Reyer Venezia | 3

Finals
4 | Banco di Sardegna Sassari | 3
3 | Umana Reyer Venezia | 4

== Quarterfinals ==
All times were in Central European Summer Time (UTC+02:00)

The quarterfinals were played in a best of five format.

=== AX Armani Exchange Milano v Sidigas Avellino ===
| 18 May 2019 | AX Armani Exchange Milano | 74–82 (Series: 0–1) | Sidigas Avellino | Assago, Milan |
| 19:00 | Scoring by quarter: 20–13, 13–26, 19–20, 22–23 |
| Eurosport | Pts: Micov 23; Rebs: Brooks, Tarczewski 6 Asts: Cinciarini 4 PIR: Micov 26 | Boxscore | Pts: Sykes 21; Rebs: Udanoh, Campogrande 9 Asts: Sykes 10; PIR: Sykes 23 | Arena: Mediolanum Forum; Referees: Manuel Mazzoni, Gianluca Sardella, Alessandro Perciavalle |

| 20 May 2019 | AX Armani Exchange Milano | 76–61 (Series: 1–1) | Sidigas Avellino | Assago, Milan |
| 20:30 | Scoring by quarter: 13–18, 29–12, 16–14, 18–17 |
| Eurosport | Pts: Nunnally 19; Rebs: Tarczewski 8 Asts: Jerrells 4 PIR: Tarczewski 17 | Boxscore | Pts: Sykes 23; Rebs: Young 12; Asts: Harper 3 PIR: Sykes 21 | Arena: Mediolanum Forum; Referees: Tolga Sahin, Lorenzo Baldini, Guido Giovannetti |

| 22 May 2019 | Sidigas Avellino | 69–62 (Series: 2–1) | AX Armani Exchange Milano | Avellino |
| 20:30 | Scoring by quarter: 21–18, 18–11, 10–21, 20–12 |
| Eurosport | Pts: Filloy 16; Rebs: Udanoh 8 Asts: Udanoh 4 PIR: Udanoh 21 | Boxscore | Pts: Cinciarini 12; Rebs: Tarczewski 12; Asts: Cinciarini 5 PIR: Tarczewski, Cinciarini 17 | Arena: PalaDelMauro; Referees: Carmelo Paternicò, Alessandro Martolini, Denis Quarta |

| 24 May 2019 | Sidigas Avellino | 80–86 (Series: 2–2) | AX Armani Exchange Milano | Avellino |
| 20:30 | Scoring by quarter: 15–26, 16–17, 24–21, 25–22 |
| Eurosport | Pts: Harper 29; Rebs: Costello 7 Asts: three players 4 PIR: Harper 29 | Boxscore | Pts: Nunnally 28; Rebs: Kuzminskas 11; Asts: Cinciarini 4 PIR: Nunnally 29 | Arena: PalaDelMauro; Referees: Michele Rossi, Carmelo Lo Guzzo, Mark Bartoli |

| 26 May 2019 | AX Armani Exchange Milano | 92–76 (Series: 3–2) | Sidigas Avellino | Assago, Milan |
| 20:30 | Scoring by quarter: 26–17, 21–22, 26–21, 19–16 |
| Eurosport | Pts: Nunnally 25; Rebs: Tarczewski, Brooks 7 Asts: Nunnally 7 PIR: Nunnally 30 | Boxscore | Pts: Harper, Nichols 15; Rebs: Udanoh 9 Asts: Harper 6 PIR: Sykes 22 | Arena: Mediolanum Forum; Referees: Tolga Sahin, Luca Weidmann, Beniamino Manuel Attard |

Regular season series
Tied 1–1 in the regular season series

30 December 2018

Boxscore

| Sidigas Avellino | 85–81 | AX Armani Exchange Milano |

PalaDelMauro, Avellino

28 April 2019

Boxscore

| AX Armani Exchange Milano | 85–79 | Sidigas Avellino |

Mediolanum Forum, Milan

=== Banco di Sardegna Sassari v New Basket Brindisi ===
| 18 May 2019 | Banco di Sardegna Sassari | 89–73 (Series: 1–0) | New Basket Brindisi | Sassari |
| 20:45 | Scoring by quarter: 25–19, 17–19, 25–21, 22–14 |
| Eurosport, Rai Sport | Pts: Pierre 21; Rebs: Thomas 9 Asts: Spissu 11; PIR: Pierre 30 | Boxscore | Pts: Banks 18; Rebs: Brown 8 Asts: Chappell 7 PIR: Banks, Gaffney 20 | Arena: PalaSerradimigni; Referees: Roberto Begnis, Beniamino Manuel Attard, Denis Quarta |

| 20 May 2019 | Banco di Sardegna Sassari | 106–97 (Series: 2–0) | New Basket Brindisi | Sassari |
| 20:45 | Scoring by quarter: 25–26, 24–21, 25–23, 32–27 |
| Eurosport, Rai Sport | Pts: Thomas 17; Rebs: Pierre 15; Asts: Gentile 7 PIR: Gentile 24 | Boxscore | Pts: Banks 27; Rebs: Gaffney 6 Asts: Moraschini, Banks 7 PIR: Banks 29 | Arena: PalaSerradimigni; Referees: Carmelo Lo Guzzo, Luca Weidmann, Mark Bartoli |

| 22 May 2019 | New Basket Brindisi | 87–92 (Series: 0–3) | Banco di Sardegna Sassari | Brindisi |
| 20:45 | Scoring by quarter: 18–24, 24–19, 23–24, 22–25 |
| Eurosport, Rai Sport | Pts: Banks 25; Rebs: Banks, Chappell 4 Asts: Banks 5 PIR: Banks 24 | Boxscore | Pts: Cooley 20; Rebs: Cooley 9 Asts: Pierre 5 PIR: Cooley, Pierre 25 | Arena: PalaPentassuglia; Referees: Manuel Mazzoni, Gianluca Sardella, Alessandro Perciavalle |

Regular season series
Tied 1–1 in the regular season series

21 October 2018

Boxscore

| New Basket Brindisi | 84–90 | Banco di Sardegna Sassari |

PalaPentassuglia, Brindisi

3 February 2019

Boxscore

| Banco di Sardegna Sassari | 98–103 | New Basket Brindisi |

PalaSerradimigni, Sassari

=== Vanoli Cremona v Alma Pallacanestro Trieste ===
| 19 May 2019 | Vanoli Cremona | 82–75 (Series: 1–0) | Alma Pallacanestro Trieste | Cremona |
| 18:15 | Scoring by quarter: 25–24, 21–20, 16–19, 20–12 |
| Eurosport | Pts: Crawford 21; Rebs: Mathiang 18; Asts: Saunders 4 PIR: Mathiang 22 | Boxscore | Pts: Dragić 16; Rebs: Da Ros 8 Asts: Wright 4 PIR: Mosley 17 | Arena: PalaRadi; Referees: Saverio Lanzarini, Maurizio Biggi, Christian Borgo |

| 21 May 2019 | Vanoli Cremona | 89–81 (Series: 2–0) | Alma Pallacanestro Trieste | Cremona |
| 20:30 | Scoring by quarter: 25–24, 17–19, 23–16, 24–22 |
| Eurosport | Pts: Crawford 23; Rebs: Mathiang 14; Asts: Saunders, Diener 5 PIR: Crawford 19 | Boxscore | Pts: Knox 21; Rebs: Strautiņš 7 Asts: Wright 4 PIR: Knox 20 | Arena: PalaRadi; Referees: Michele Rossi, Alessandro Vicino, Gabriele Bettini |

| 23 May 2019 | Alma Pallacanestro Trieste | 91–86 (Series: 1–2) | Vanoli Cremona | Trieste |
| 20:30 | Scoring by quarter: 28–13, 19–18, 28–28, 16–24 |
| Eurosport | Pts: Dragić 26; Rebs: Mosley 8 Asts: Wright, Fernández 4 PIR: Dragić 22 | Boxscore | Pts: Crawford 26; Rebs: Saunders 12; Asts: Diener 6 PIR: Crawford 23 | Arena: Allianz Dome; Referees: Massimiliano Filippini, Luca Weidmann, Denny Borgioni |

| 25 May 2019 | Alma Pallacanestro Trieste | 78–81 (Series: 1–3) | Vanoli Cremona | Trieste |
| 20:30 | Scoring by quarter: 29–21, 19–22, 18–15, 12–23 |
| Eurosport | Pts: Wright 18; Rebs: Mosley 14; Asts: Sanders 6 PIR: Mosley 20 | Boxscore | Pts: Crawford 33; Rebs: Mathiang 10; Asts: Diener, Saunders 4 PIR: Crawford 35 | Arena: Allianz Dome; Referees: Manuel Mazzoni, Fabrizio Paglialunga, Guido Giovannetti |

Regular season series
Tied 1–1 in the regular season series

12 December 2018

Boxscore

| Vanoli Cremona | 87–78 | Alma Pallacanestro Trieste |

PalaRadi, Cremona

31 March 2019

Boxscore

| Alma Pallacanestro Trieste | 97–80 | Vanoli Cremona |

Allianz Dome, Trieste

=== Umana Reyer Venezia v Dolomiti Energia Trento ===
| 19 May 2019 | Umana Reyer Venezia | 67–57 (Series: 1–0) | Dolomiti Energia Trento | Mestre, Venice |
| 20:45 | Scoring by quarter: 11–23, 17–8, 22–11, 17–15 |
| Eurosport, Rai Sport | Pts: Haynes 14; Rebs: Watt, Stone 9 Asts: Haynes 5 PIR: Vidmar 17 | Boxscore | Pts: Marble 18; Rebs: Hogue 12; Asts: Forray, Craft 2 PIR: Marble 19 | Arena: Palasport Taliercio; Referees: Carmelo Paternicò, Alessandro Martolini, Denny Borgioni |

| 21 May 2019 | Umana Reyer Venezia | 69–51 (Series: 2–0) | Dolomiti Energia Trento | Mestre, Venice |
| 20:45 | Scoring by quarter: 15–11, 19–10, 16–15, 19–15 |
| Eurosport, Rai Sport | Pts: Daye 15; Rebs: Stone 8 Asts: De Nicolao 5 PIR: Daye 22 | Boxscore | Pts: Forray 11; Rebs: Gomes 10; Asts: Flaccadori 3 PIR: Pascolo 12 | Arena: Palasport Taliercio; Referees: Roberto Begnis, Beniamino Manuel Attard, Fabrizio Paglialunga |

| 23 May 2019 | Dolomiti Energia Trento | 72–59 (Series: 1–2) | Umana Reyer Venezia | Trento |
| 20:45 | Scoring by quarter: 13–11, 25–12, 21–17, 13–19 |
| Eurosport, Rai Sport | Pts: Gomes, Marble 17; Rebs: Craft 11; Asts: Craft 4 PIR: Gomes 23 | Boxscore | Pts: Haynes 15; Rebs: Watt 6 Asts: Stone 4 PIR: Watt 21 | Arena: BLM Group Arena; Referees: Tolga Sahin, Maurizio Biggi, Lorenzo Baldini |

| 25 May 2019 | Dolomiti Energia Trento | 61–51 (Series: 2–2) | Umana Reyer Venezia | Trento |
| 20:45 | Scoring by quarter: 19–14, 14–11, 12–11, 16–15 |
| Eurosport, Rai Sport | Pts: Marble 16; Rebs: Hogue 11; Asts: Marble, Gomes 3 PIR: Hogue 25 | Boxscore | Pts: Bramos 15; Rebs: Stone 8 Asts: De Nicolao, Watt 3 PIR: Bramos 16 | Arena: BLM Group Arena; Referees: Saverio Lanzarini, Luca Weidmann, Gabriele Bettini |

| 27 May 2019 | Umana Reyer Venezia | 87–62 (Series: 3–2) | Dolomiti Energia Trento | Mestre, Venice |
| 20:45 | Scoring by quarter: 16–14, 24–10, 19–15, 28–23 |
| Eurosport, Rai Sport | Pts: Haynes 23; Rebs: Daye 11; Asts: De Nicolao 10; PIR: Daye 26 | Boxscore | Pts: Marble 16; Rebs: Hogue 8 Asts: Hogue 4 PIR: Hogue 18 | Arena: Palasport Taliercio; Referees: Roberto Begnis, Maurizio Biggi, Christian Borgo |

Regular season series
Tied 1–1 in the regular season series

27 October 2018

Boxscore

| Dolomiti Energia Trento | 64–87 | Umana Reyer Venezia |

BLM Group Arena, Trento

10 February 2019

Boxscore

| Umana Reyer Venezia | 77–81 | Dolomiti Energia Trento |

Palasport Taliercio, Venice

== Semifinals ==
All times are in Central European Summer Time (UTC+02:00)

The semifinals are played in a best of five format.

=== AX Armani Exchange Milano v Banco di Sardegna Sassari ===
| 29 May 2019 | AX Armani Exchange Milano | 79–86 (Series: 0–1) | Banco di Sardegna Sassari | Assago, Milan |
| 20:45 | Scoring by quarter: 18–16, 17–25, 25–19, 19–26 |
| Eurosport, Rai Sport | Pts: Micov 16; Rebs: Tarczewski 13; Asts: Micov 3 PIR: Tarczewski 25 | Boxscore | Pts: Gentile 26; Rebs: Thomas, Pierre 11; Asts: Pierre 4 PIR: Thomas 32 | Arena: Mediolanum Forum; Referees: Manuel Mazzoni, Michele Rossi, Alessandro Vicino |

| 31 May 2019 | AX Armani Exchange Milano | 101–112(OT) (Series: 0–2) | Banco di Sardegna Sassari | Assago, Milan |
| 20:45 | Scoring by quarter: 21–20, 32–32, 28–19, 14–24, Overtime: 6–12 |
| Eurosport, Rai Sport | Pts: James 32; Rebs: Tarczewski, Brooks 8 Asts: James 3 PIR: James 32 | Boxscore | Pts: Polonara 29; Rebs: Thomas 17; Asts: Spissu 4 PIR: Polonara 34 | Arena: Mediolanum Forum; Referees: Roberto Begnis, Gianluca Sardella, Gabriele Bettini |

| 2 June 2019 | Banco di Sardegna Sassari | 108–96(OT) (Series: 3–0) | AX Armani Exchange Milano | Sassari |
| 20:45 | Scoring by quarter: 29–21, 22–31, 23–14, 15–23, Overtime: 19–7 |
| Eurosport, Rai Sport | Pts: Smith 29; Rebs: Thomas 8 Asts: Thomas, Gentile 6 PIR: Smith 28 | Boxscore | Pts: Nunnally 19; Rebs: Tarczewski 9 Asts: James 7 PIR: Kuzminskas 22 | Arena: PalaSerradimigni; Referees: Massimiliano Filippini, Alessandro Martolini, Luca Weidmann |

Regular season series
Tied 1–1 in the regular season series

16 December 2018

Boxscore

| Banco di Sardegna Sassari | 106–107 | AX Armani Exchange Milano |

PalaSerradimigni, Sassari

7 April 2019

Boxscore

| AX Armani Exchange Milano | 79–93 | Banco di Sardegna Sassari |

Mediolanum Forum, Milan

=== Vanoli Cremona v Umana Reyer Venezia ===
| 30 May 2019 | Vanoli Cremona | 80–87 (Series: 0–1) | Umana Reyer Venezia | Cremona |
| 20:45 | Scoring by quarter: 24–20, 16–17, 19–27, 21–23 |
| Eurosport, Rai Sport | Pts: Diener 15; Rebs: Mathiang 15; Asts: Diener 6 PIR: Mathiang 26 | Boxscore | Pts: Watt 22; Rebs: Watt 7 Asts: Haynes 5 PIR: Watt 31 | Arena: PalaRadi; Referees: Carmelo Paternico, Beniamino Manuel Attard, Fabrizio Paglialunga |

| 1 June 2019 | Vanoli Cremona | 78–74 (Series: 1–1) | Umana Reyer Venezia | Cremona |
| 20:45 | Scoring by quarter: 22–20, 17–17, 21–25, 18–12 |
| Eurosport, Rai Sport | Pts: Saunders 18; Rebs: Mathiang, Saunders 9 Asts: Diener, Stojanović 5 PIR: Saunders 22 | Boxscore | Pts: Watt 17; Rebs: three players 5 Asts: Stone 7 PIR: Daye 15 | Arena: PalaRadi; Referees: Saverio Lanzarini, Carmelo Lo Guzzo, Denis Quarta |

| 3 June 2019 | Umana Reyer Venezia | 73–75(OT) (Series: 1–2) | Vanoli Cremona | Mestre, Venice |
| 20:45 | Scoring by quarter: 20–18, 13–17, 16–14, 16–16, Overtime: 8–10 |
| Eurosport, Rai Sport | Pts: Daye 18; Rebs: Watt 12; Asts: Haynes 5 PIR: Watt 25 | Boxscore | Pts: Saunders 18; Rebs: Mathiang 11; Asts: Diener 5 PIR: Saunders 22 | Arena: Palasport Taliercio; Referees: Tolga Sahin, Maurizio Biggi, Christian Borgo |

| 5 June 2019 | Umana Reyer Venezia | 78–75 (Series: 2–2) | Vanoli Cremona | Mestre, Venice |
| 20:45 | Scoring by quarter: 30–10, 19–21, 11–19, 18–25 |
| Eurosport, Rai Sport | Pts: Watt 19; Rebs: Vidmar 10; Asts: Stone 4 PIR: Watt 21 | Boxscore | Pts: Mathiang 22; Rebs: Mathiang 7 Asts: Ruzzier 4 PIR: Mathiang 27 | Arena: Palasport Taliercio; Referees: Carmelo Paternico', Michele Rossi, Lorenzo Baldini |

| 7 June 2019 | Vanoli Cremona | 69–79 (Series: 2–3) | Umana Reyer Venezia | Cremona |
| 20:45 | Scoring by quarter: 12–25, 21–22, 15–20, 21–12 |
| Eurosport, Rai Sport | Pts: Saunders 21; Rebs: Mathiang 14; Asts: Diener 4 PIR: Saunders 19 | Boxscore | Pts: Bramos 22; Rebs: Stone 8 Asts: Daye 3 PIR: Bramos 22 | Arena: PalaRadi; Referees: Saverio Lanzarini, Manuel Mazzoni, Alessandro Vicino |

Regular season series
Tied 1–1 in the regular season series

6 January 2019

Boxscore

| Umana Reyer Venezia | 79–67 | Vanoli Cremona |

Palasport Taliercio, Venice

5 May 2019

Boxscore

| Vanoli Cremona | 80–65 | Umana Reyer Venezia |

PalaRadi, Cremona

== Finals ==
All times were in Central European Summer Time (UTC+02:00)

The finals were played in a best of seven format.

=== Umana Reyer Venezia v Banco di Sardegna Sassari ===
| 10 June 2019 | Umana Reyer Venezia | 72–70 (Series: 1–0) | Banco di Sardegna Sassari | Mestre, Venice |
| 20:45 | Scoring by quarter: 18–14, 11–23, 25–15, 18–18 |
| Eurosport, Rai Sport | Pts: Haynes 15; Rebs: Vidmar, Stone 4 Asts: Stone 3 PIR: Haynes 12 | Boxscore | Pts: McGee 19; Rebs: Cooley 11; Asts: five players 2 PIR: McGee, Thomas 17 | Arena: Palasport Taliercio; Referees: Massimiliano Filippini, Carmelo Lo Guzzo, Beniamino Manuel Attard |

| 12 June 2019 | Umana Reyer Venezia | 66–80 (Series: 1–1) | Banco di Sardegna Sassari | Mestre, Venice |
| 20:45 | Scoring by quarter: 17–21, 13–20, 22–25, 14–14 |
| Eurosport, Rai Sport | Pts: Daye 20; Rebs: Daye 8 Asts: four players 2 PIR: Daye 15 | Boxscore | Pts: Smith 19; Rebs: Cooley 11; Asts: Smith 6 PIR: Cooley 25 | Arena: Palasport Taliercio; Referees: Tolga Sahin, Saverio Lanzarini, Luca Weidmann |

| 14 June 2019 | Banco di Sardegna Sassari | 73–76 (Series: 1–2) | Umana Reyer Venezia | Sassari |
| 20:45 | Scoring by quarter: 16–19, 16–20, 14–20, 27–17 |
| Eurosport, Rai Sport | Pts: Thomas 17; Rebs: Cooley, Pierre 8 Asts: three players 3 PIR: Thomas 20 | Boxscore | Pts: Daye 22; Rebs: Daye, Watt 7 Asts: three players 3 PIR: Daye 24 | Arena: PalaSerradimigni; Referees: Carmelo Paternico', Manuel Mazzoni, Alessandro Martolini |

| 16 June 2019 | Banco di Sardegna Sassari | 95–88 (Series: 2–2) | Umana Reyer Venezia | Sassari |
| 20:45 | Scoring by quarter: 23–16, 28–25, 30–24, 14–23 |
| Eurosport, Rai Sport | Pts: Thomas 19; Rebs: Cooley 9 Asts: Smith 4 PIR: Cooley 29 | Boxscore | Pts: Haynes 22; Rebs: three players 5 Asts: Stone 6 PIR: Stone 13 | Arena: PalaSerradimigni; Referees: Roberto Begnis, Michele Rossi, Maurizio Biggi |

| 18 June 2019 | Umana Reyer Venezia | 78–65 (Series: 3–2) | Banco di Sardegna Sassari | Mestre, Venice |
| 20:45 | Scoring by quarter: 21–14, 17–20, 22–19, 18–12 |
| Eurosport, Rai Sport | Pts: Daye 20; Rebs: Daye 7 Asts: Haynes, Stone 4 PIR: Daye 22 | Boxscore | Pts: Thomas 20; Rebs: Pierre 11; Asts: Spissu 3 PIR: Thomas 19 | Arena: Palasport Taliercio; Referees: Carmelo Paternico', Massimiliano Filippini, Denis Quarta |

| 20 June 2019 | Banco di Sardegna Sassari | 87–77 (Series: 3–3) | Umana Reyer Venezia | Sassari |
| 20:45 | Scoring by quarter: 19–25, 15–15, 29–17, 24–20 |
| Eurosport, Rai Sport | Pts: Cooley 26; Rebs: Cooley 11; Asts: three players 4 PIR: Cooley 29 | Boxscore | Pts: Watt 17; Rebs: De Nicolao 6 Asts: Daye 7 PIR: Watt 21 | Arena: PalaSerradimigni; Referees: Saverio Lanzarini, Manuel Mazzoni, Luca Weidmann |

| 22 June 2019 | Umana Reyer Venezia | 87–61 (Series: 4–3) | Banco di Sardegna Sassari | Mestre, Venice |
| 20:45 | Scoring by quarter: 16–12, 23–18, 30–17, 18–14 |
| Eurosport, Rai Sport | Pts: Bramos 22; Rebs: Mazzola 7 Asts: Stone 4 PIR: Bramos 24 | Boxscore | Pts: Thomas 16; Rebs: Cooley 11; Asts: McGee 3 PIR: Cooley 18 | Arena: Palasport Taliercio; Referees: Carmelo Paternico', Roberto Begnis, Michele Rossi |
