= Massimo Maffezzoli =

Italian basketball coach (born 1976)

SIG Strasbourg
- Position: Assistant coach
- League: LNB Élite; Champions League

Personal information
- Born: 21 February 1976 (age 50) Verona, Italy
- Coaching career: 2008–present

Career history

Coaching
- 2008–2010: Pallacanestro Trapani (assistant)
- 2010–2011: Rimini Crabs (assistant)
- 2011–2012: Veroli Basket (assistant)
- 2012–2013: Virtus Roma (assistant)
- 2013–2015: Dinamo Sassari (assistant)
- 2015: Dinamo Sassari
- 2015–2016: Dinamo Sassari (assistant)
- 2016–2018: New Basket Brindisi (assistant)
- 2018–2019: Scandone Avellino (assistant)
- 2019: Scandone Avellino
- 2019–2020: Eurobasket Roma
- 2021–2022: Chieti Basket 1974
- 2022–2023: Pallacanestro Trieste
- 2023–2025: Xinjiang Flying Tigers (assistant)
- 2025–present: SIG Strasbourg (assistant)

Massimo Maffezzoli (born 21 February 1976) is an Italian basketball coach, currently working as an assistant manager for SIG Strasbourg of the French LNB Pro A.

== Career ==
Massimo Maffezzoli started his coach-career managing the youth sector of Scaligera Verona, SanZeno Verona, VL Pesaro, Aquila Trento and UC Casalpusterlengo from 1997 to 2008.

He later started a long career as assistant-coach of many clubs like Pallacanestro Trapani, Rimini Crabs, Veroli Basket, and Virtus Roma (in Serie A).

On 2 July 2013 Maffezzoli became assistant coach of Dinamo Sassari.

From 2016 to 2018, he was assistant coach for New Basket Brindisi.

In 2018 Maffezzoli became assistant coach for Scandone Avellino. On 10 April 2019 Maffezzoli became new head coach of Avellino.

On June 11, 2025, he signed with SIG Strasbourg of the French LNB Pro A as an assistant coach.

== Honours and titles ==
Assistant Coach

- Lega Basket Serie A: 1

Dinamo Sassari (2015)

- Italian Basketball Cup: 2

Dinamo Sassari (2014, 2015)

- Italian Basketball Supercup: 1

Dinamo Sassari (2014)

- Italian LNP Cup: 1

UC Casalpusterlengo (2007)
