= Drew Crawford =

American basketball player

No. 22 – Maccabi Ramat Gan
- Position: Shooting guard / small forward
- League: Israeli Basketball Premier League

Personal information
- Born: October 18, 1990 (age 35) Naperville, Illinois, U.S.
- Listed height: 6 ft 5 in (1.96 m)
- Listed weight: 210 lb (95 kg)

Career information
- High school: Naperville Central (Naperville, Illinois)
- College: Northwestern (2009–2014)
- NBA draft: 2014: undrafted
- Playing career: 2014–present

Career history
- 2014–2015: Erie BayHawks
- 2015–2016: Bnei Herzliya
- 2016–2017: MHP Riesen Ludwigsburg
- 2017–2018: Maccabi Rishon LeZion
- 2018–2019: Vanoli Cremona
- 2019–2020: Gaziantep
- 2020: Olimpia Milano
- 2020–2021: Basket Brescia Leonessa
- 2021–2022: Andorra
- 2022–2023: Aquila Basket Trento
- 2023–2024: Hapoel Holon
- 2024–present: Maccabi Ramat Gan

Career highlights
- LBA Most Valuable Player (2019); First-team Academic All-American (2014); Second-team Academic All-American (2012); 2× Third-team All-Big Ten (2012, 2014); Big Ten Freshman of the Year – Media (2010); Big Ten All-Freshman team (2010)
- Stats at Basketball Reference

Andrew Eugene Crawford (born October 18, 1990) is an American professional basketball player for Maccabi Ramat Gan of the Israeli Basketball Premier League. He played college basketball for the Northwestern Wildcats. He was the 2009–10 Big Ten Freshman of the Year (media) and is a two-time Academic All-American as well as a third team 2011–12 All-Big Ten selection. He was a third-team All-Big Ten selection by the media and honorable mention selection by the coaches in 2014. Crawford was named the Italian League MVP after leading Vanoli Cremona to the Italian League Semifinals in 2019.

== Early life ==
Crawford was born on October 18, 1990, to National Basketball Association referee Dan Crawford and Claudia, who is of Lithuanian descent.

By sixth grade, Crawford had given up all other sports to focus on basketball. He was a starter in high school as a sophomore. As both a junior and a senior, he was the DuPage Valley Conference Player of the Year. Because of his father's multi-decade career as an NBA referee, Crawford has been exposed to basketball at a high level from an early age. He shot around with LeBron James just before he went pro and also counts Reggie Miller among his early exposures to the game. As a high school basketball player, he was rated as the 40th and 72nd best shooting guard in the national class of 2009 by Scout.com and ESPN.com, respectively. He was also an A+ student in high school.

College recruiting
Name	Hometown	School	Height	Weight	Commit date
Drew Crawford; SG	Naperville, Illinois	Naperville (IL)	6 ft 4.5 in (1.94 m)	187.5 lb (85.0 kg)	Sep 9, 2008
Drew Crawford; SG	Recruit ratings: Scout: Rivals: (86)				
Overall recruit ranking: Scout: 40 (SG) ESPN: 72 (SG)
Note: In many cases, Scout, Rivals, 247Sports, On3, and ESPN may conflict in their listings of height and weight.; In these cases, the average was taken. ESPN grades are on a 100-point scale.; Sources: "Northwestern Basketball Commitments". Rivals.; "2009 Northwestern Basketball Commits". Scout.; "ESPN". ESPN.; "Scout.com Team Recruiting Rankings". Scout.; "2009 Team Ranking". Rivals.

== College career ==
On December 13, 2009, Crawford scored 35 points against North Carolina A&T. On December 14, 2009, Crawford was named Big Ten Conference player of the week. On March 9, 2010, he was named Big Ten Freshman of the Year by the media (D. J. Richardson earned the same honor from the coaches). That season, he was an honorable mention 2009–10 All-Big Ten performer and one of three unanimous All-Freshman selections (along with Richardson and Christian Watford). He concluded the post season with a pair of double-doubles against Purdue on March 12 in Northwestern's final game of the 2010 Big Ten Conference men's basketball tournament and against Rhode Island on March 17 in Northwestern's only game in the 2010 National Invitation Tournament.

On February 3, 2011, Crawford was selected by CoSIDA as among the forty Academic All-District players, making him one of 40 finalists for fifteen 2010–11 Academic All-American selections. On March 11, he posted his third career double-double against Ohio State in the 2011 Big Ten Conference men's basketball tournament.

On November 21, 2011, Crawford was named Big Ten player of the week. He scored 34 points on December 22, 2011, against Creighton. On February 23, 2012, Crawford was named to the 2011–12 Academic All-American second team. He was selected as a third-team All-Big Ten selection by both the coaches and the media.

As a senior, he was a preseason candidate for the 2012–13 men's basketball Senior CLASS Award. On December 14, the team announced that Crawford would have season-ending surgery to repair a torn labrum in his right shoulder.

The following year as a redshirt senior, Crawford began the season as the Big Ten active career scoring leader. On November 9, he opened the 2013–14 season with a double-double of 25 points and 11 rebounds against Eastern Illinois. On January 29, Crawford posted 30 points and 8 rebounds to lead Northwestern to a 65–56 victory over (#14 AP Poll/#13 Coaches' Poll) Wisconsin. On January 31, he was again named an Academic All-District by CoSIDA. On February 3, he was named Big Ten Conference Co-Athlete of the week (along with D. J. Newbill). The following day, he was recognized as the Oscar Robertson National Player of the Week by the United States Basketball Writers Association. On February 20, he was named a first-team Academic All-America selection. By the time he celebrated Senior day on March 6, he was the Northwestern all-time leader in games played and games started. Following the regular season, Crawford was a third-team All-Big Ten selection by the media and honorable mention selection by the coaches. Crawford was listed on the National Association of Basketball Coaches Division I All‐District 7 second team on March 12. Crawford earned his fourth Academic All-Big Ten recognition in 2014.

== Professional career ==
After going undrafted in the 2014 NBA draft, Crawford joined the New Orleans Pelicans for the 2014 NBA Summer League. On September 29, 2014, he signed with the Orlando Magic. However, he was later waived by the Magic on October 25, 2014. Five days later, he was acquired by the Erie BayHawks of the NBA Development League as an affiliate player of Orlando. He debuted for the BayHawks with a 22-point, 9-rebound performance against the Idaho Stampede on November 14.

In July 2015, Crawford joined the Orlando Magic for the 2015 NBA Summer League. On August 7, 2015, Crawford signed with Bnei Herzliya of the Israeli Basketball Premier League. Crawford signed with Barangay Ginebra San Miguel of the Philippine Basketball Association on June 2, 2016, but he backed out in order to attempt to pursue the NBA Summer League.

In July 2016, Crawford joined the Toronto Raptors for the 2016 NBA Summer League. On August 11, 2016, he signed with the Raptors, but was waived on October 22 after appearing in seven preseason games. On November 28, he signed with MHP Riesen Ludwigsburg of the German Bundesliga.

On August 7, 2017, Crawford returned to Israel for a second stint, signing a one-year deal with Maccabi Rishon LeZion. On November 18, 2017, Crawford recorded a season-high 32 points, shooting 11-of-15 from the field, along with 4 rebounds in a 92–88 win over Ironi Nahariya.

On July 27, 2018, Crawford signed with the Italian team Vanoli Cremona for the 2018–19 season. On May 25, 2019, Crawford recorded a career-high 33 points, shooting 13–21 from the field, along with six rebounds and three assists in an 81–78 playoff win over Pallacanestro Trieste. Crawford led Cremona to the 2019 Italian League Semifinals, where they eventually were eliminated by Reyer Venezia. In 34 games played for Cremona, he averaged 17.7 points, 4.1 rebounds and 1.9 assists per game. On May 13, 2019, Crawford was named the Italian League MVP.

On July 20, 2019, Crawford signed a one-year deal with Gaziantep of the Turkish Basketball Super League. He appeared in 29 games for Gaziantep, averaging 12.9 points, 3.7 rebounds and 1.7 assists per game.

On January 27, 2020, Crawford returned to Italy for a second stint, signing with Olimpia Milano for the rest of the EuroLeague season.

On July 5, 2020, he signed with Basket Brescia Leonessa of the Italian Lega Basket Serie A (LBA).

On July 19, 2021, Crawford signed with MoraBanc Andorra of the Liga ACB.

On August 29, 2022, he signed with Dolomiti Energia Trento of the Lega Basket Serie A (LBA).

On August 13, 2023, he signed with Hapoel Holon of the Israeli Basketball Premier League.
