= Travis Diener =

American-Italian basketball player (born 1982)

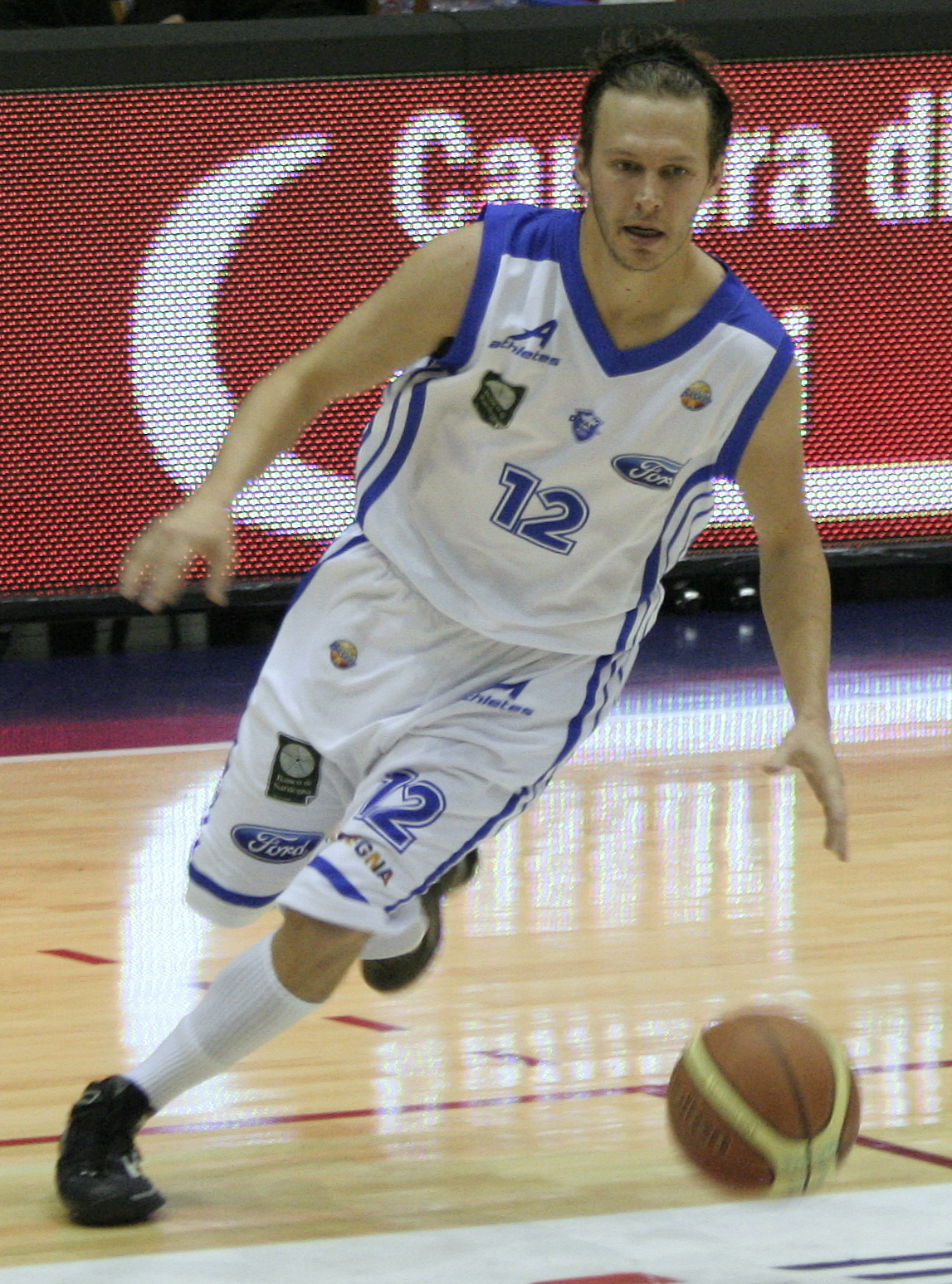
- Diener with Dinamo Sassari in 2010

Personal information
- Born: March 1, 1982 (age 44) Fond du Lac, Wisconsin, U.S.
- Listed height: 1.85 m (6 ft 1 in)
- Listed weight: 79 kg (174 lb)

Career information
- High school: Goodrich (Fond du Lac, Wisconsin)
- College: Marquette (2001–2005)
- NBA draft: 2005: 2nd round, 38th overall pick
- Drafted by: Orlando Magic
- Playing career: 2005–2020
- Position: Point guard
- Number: 34, 12, 27, 7

Career history
- 2005–2007: Orlando Magic
- 2007–2010: Indiana Pacers
- 2010: Portland Trail Blazers
- 2010–2014: Dinamo Sassari
- 2017–2020: Vanoli Cremona

Career highlights
- 2× Italian Cup winner (2014, 2019); Italian Cup MVP (2014); 2× Serie A All-Star (2011, 2012); Serie A Three Point Contest winner (2012); No. 12 retired by Dinamo Sassari; 2× First-team All-Conference USA (2004, 2005); Fourth-team Parade All-American (2001)

Career NBA statistics
- Points: 854 (4.8 ppg)
- Rebounds: 243 (1.4 rpg)
- Assists: 432 (2.4 apg)
- Stats at NBA.com
- Stats at Basketball Reference

Travis Lyle Diener (/ˈdiːnər/ DEE-nər; born March 1, 1982) is an American-Italian former professional basketball player who last played for Vanoli Cremona in the Italian Lega Basket Serie A (LBA). He also holds Italian citizenship, and has played for the Italian national team at EuroBasket 2013.

== Career ==
Diener played collegiately at Marquette University, and was a member of the Golden Eagles team that reached the NCAA Tournament Final Four in 2003. Diener was one of three future NBA players from that Golden Eagles team; the others were Dwyane Wade and Steve Novak.

Following his college career at Marquette, he was a second-round draft choice (38th overall) of the Orlando Magic in the 2005 NBA draft.

Diener made his NBA debut on December 2, 2005, playing 12 minutes and scoring three points in a loss against the Memphis Grizzlies.

On June 19, 2007, the Indiana Pacers signed Diener (who was a free agent) to a three-year deal reportedly worth $4.86 million.

On July 6, 2009, Diener exercised his player option to remain with the Pacers for the 2009-10 NBA season. He was waived by Indiana and signed by the Portland Trail Blazers in March 2010.

In August 2010, he was signed by Dinamo Sassari of the Italian Lega Basket Serie A.

In May 2013, he acquired Italian citizenship through his wife, who is of Italian descent. This allowed him to join the Italian national basketball team.

In 2014, Diener retired from professional basketball, after which he became director of player personnel at Marquette University. His jersey number 12 was retired by Dinamo Sassari.

In July 2017, Diener came out of retirement to sign with Vanoli Cremona. He re-signed with the club in July 2018.

== The Basketball Tournament ==
Diener has played for Golden Eagles (a team primarily consisting of Marquette alumni) in The Basketball Tournament (TBT), an annual single-elimination winner-take-all tournament. In five games of TBT 2018, he averaged 8.6 points, 4.2 assists, and shot 43 percent from the field. Golden Eagles reached the semi-finals before falling to the eventual champions, Overseas Elite. Diener rejoined the Marquette alumni team for the "Championship Weekend" of TBT 2019, hitting the deciding three-pointer of a semi-final win over Team Hines, before Golden Eagles fell to Carmen's Crew (a team primarily consisting of Ohio State alumni) in the final. In TBT 2020, he again joined Golden Eagles for its final contests. During the championship game against Sideline Cancer, Diener made one basket, the winning three-pointer that clinched the championship for Golden Eagles, along with the tournament's $1 million prize.

== Career statistics ==
Legend
GP	Games played	GS	Games started	MPG	Minutes per game
FG%	Field goal percentage	3P%	3-point field goal percentage	FT%	Free throw percentage
RPG	Rebounds per game	APG	Assists per game	SPG	Steals per game
BPG	Blocks per game	PPG	Points per game	**Bold**	Career high

=== NBA regular season ===
Year	Team	GP	GS	MPG	FG%	3P%	FT%	RPG	APG	SPG	BPG	PPG
2005–06	Orlando	23	0	10.7	.420	**.439**	.833	.9	.7	.3	.0	3.8
2006–07	Orlando	26	0	11.1	**.425**	.360	.800	.7	1.3	.2	.0	3.8
2007–08	Indiana	**66**	**21**	**20.5**	.370	.318	**.901**	**1.7**	**3.8**	.5	**.1**	**6.9**
2008–09	Indiana	55	0	13.1	.413	.390	.800	1.6	2.2	.5	**.1**	3.7
2009–10	Indiana	4	0	6.3	.167	.200	.000	.5	1.0	**.8**	.0	.8
2009–10	Portland	5	0	5.2	.250	.200	.500	.2	.8	.2	.0	.6
Career		179	21	14.9	.388	.353	.847	1.4	2.4	.4	.1	4.8

=== NBA Playoffs ===
Year	Team	GP	GS	MPG	FG%	3P%	FT%	RPG	APG	SPG	BPG	PPG
2010	Portland	2	0	3.5	.000	.000	.000	.0	1.0	.0	.0	.0
Career		2	0	3.5	.000	.000	.000	.0	1.0	.0	.0	.0

=== EuroCup ===
Legend
GP	Games played	GS	Games started	MPG	Minutes per game
FG%	Field-goal percentage	3P%	3-point field-goal percentage	FT%	Free-throw percentage
RPG	Rebounds per game	APG	Assists per game	SPG	Steals per game
BPG	Blocks per game	PPG	Points per game	PIR	Performance index rating
**Bold**	Career high

Year	Team	GP	GS	MPG	FG%	3P%	FT%	RPG	APG	SPG	BPG	PPG	PIR
2012–13	Dinamo Sassari	6	6	**33.1**	**.430**	**.382**	.769	1.7	**8.5**	.8	.0	**15.2**	**17.8**
2013–14	Dinamo Sassari	**14**	**8**	26.1	.370	.333	**1.000**	**2.0**	5.9	**1.0**	.0	7.8	11.4
Career		20	14	28.4	.396	.352	.875	1.9	6.7	1.0	.0	10.0	13.3

=== Domestic leagues ===
Legend
GP	Games played	GS	Games started	MPG	Minutes per game	PPG	Points per game
2P%	Two-point field goal percentage	3P%	3-point field goal percentage	FT%	Free throw percentage
RPG	Rebounds per game	APG	Assists per game	BPG	Blocks per game
SPG	Steals per game	TOPG	Turnovers per game	**Bold**	Career high

LBA Regular season
Year	Team	GP	GS	MPG	PPG	2P%	3P%	FT%	RPG	APG	BPG	SPG	TOPG
2010–11	Dinamo Sassari	28	28	31.7	13.2	.475	.367	.812	**3.5**	4.6	.0	1.2	2.5
2011–12	Dinamo Sassari	29	**29**	32.9	14.4	.503	**.417**	.794	3.2	5.5	.0	1.1	**2.7**
2012–13	Dinamo Sassari	29	**29**	**34.1**	**17.2**	.524	.397	**.845**	2.9	**7.5**	.0	**1.4**	2.4
2013–14	Dinamo Sassari	27	12	23.1	7.7	.533	.329	.788	2.1	5.2	.0	.6	1.2
2017–18	Vanoli Cremona	**30**	7	21.4	5.0	.500	.380	.824	2.4	3.7	.0	.9	1.2
2018–19	Vanoli Cremona	29	20	24.8	9.1	**.545**	.383	.788	2.1	3.7	.0	.9	1.4
Career		172	125	28.0	11.1	.501	.384	.811	2.7	5.0	.0	1.0	1.8

LBA Playoffs
Year	Team	GP	GS	MPG	PPG	2P%	3P%	FT%	RPG	APG	BPG	SPG	TOPG
2011	Dinamo Sassari	2	2	20.5	3.0	.167	.250	**1.000**	2.0	4.0	.0	**1.0**	1.0
2012	Dinamo Sassari	6	6	33.2	10.8	.404	.321	.000	**2.8**	**6.3**	.0	.3	**2.2**
2013	Dinamo Sassari	7	7	**33.4**	**13.1**	.364	.300	.893	2.4	5.7	.0	**1.0**	1.4
2014	Dinamo Sassari	**9**	7	26.1	7.7	.375	.279	.938	1.9	5.1	.0	.8	1.0
2018	Vanoli Cremona	3	0	22.7	9.3	**.875**	.429	**1.000**	2.0	2.7	.0	**1.0**	2.0
2019	Vanoli Cremona	**9**	**9**	25.1	9.2	.469	**.444**	.714	2.1	4.1	.0	.3	.4
Career		36	31	27.8	9.5	.413	.338	.864	2.3	4.1	.0	.7	1.2

=== National team ===
Year	Competition	GP	GS	MPG	FG%	3P%	FT%	RPG	APG	SPG	BPG	PPG
2013	FIBA EuroBasket	9	0	14.1	.375	.357	.0	1.0	1.7	.0	.0	3.2
Career		9	0	14.1	.375	.357	.0	1.0	1.7	.0	.0	3.2
