= 2014 Italian Basketball Cup =

- League: Italian Basketball Cup
- Sport: Basketball
- Number of games: 7
- Number of teams: 8

Final
- Champions: Banco di Sardegna Sassari
- Runners-up: Montepaschi Siena
- Finals MVP: (Italy) Travis Diener

Italian Basketball Cup seasons
- ← 2013 2015 →

The 2014 Italian Basketball Cup was the 46th season of the Italian Basketball Cup. The tournament was held from 7 February till 9 February 2014 at the Mediolanum Forum in Milan.

Banco di Sardegna Sassari won its first cup in franchise history. Travis Diener was named Finals MVP.

== Participants ==
The following eight teams qualified based on their standings in the 2012–13 Lega Basket Serie A.

1. Enel Brindisi
2. Acqua Vitasnella Cantù
3. EA7 Emporio Armani Milano
4. Montepaschi Siena
5. Acea Roma
6. Banco di Sardegna Sassari
7. Grissin Bon Reggio Emilia
8. Umana Venezia

== Bracket ==
Quarterfinals
1	Enel Brindisi	83
8	Umana Venezia	70
4	Montepaschi Siena	76
5	Acea Roma	69
3	EA7 Emporio Armani Milano	80
6	Banco di Sardegna Sassari	82
2	Acqua Vitasnella Cantù	77
7	Grissin Bon Reggio Emilia	84

Semifinals
1	Enel Brindisi	80
4	Montepaschi Siena	89
6	Banco di Sardegna Sassari	92
7	Grissin Bon Reggio Emilia	86

Finals
4	Montepaschi Siena	73
6	Banco di Sardegna Sassari	80

2014 Italian Cup Champions
Banco di Sardegna Sassari
1st title
