= Tony Gaffney =

American basketball player (born 1984)

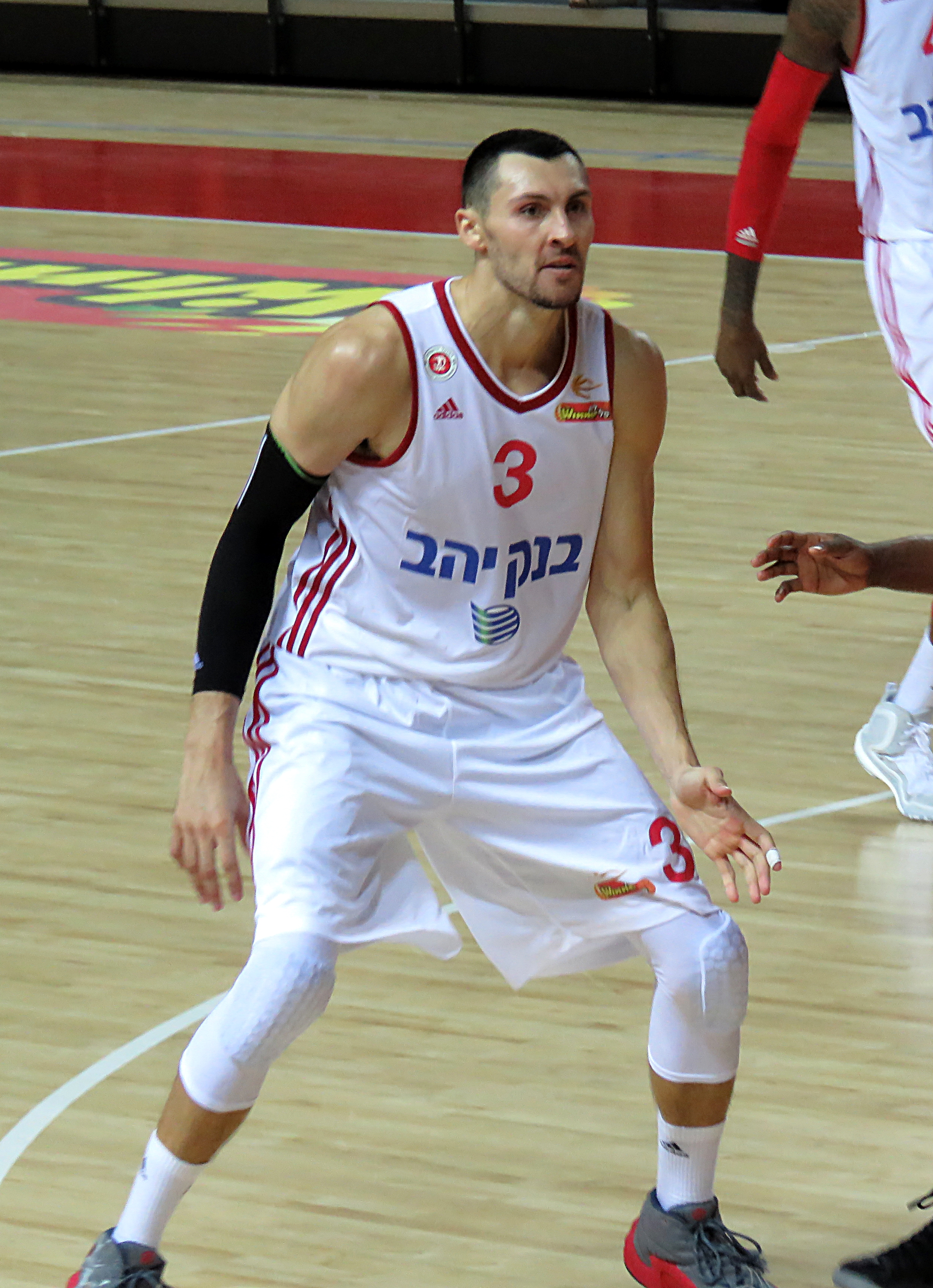
- Gaffney with Hapoel Jerusalem in 2015

Personal information
- Born: November 14, 1984 (age 41) Boston, Massachusetts, U.S.
- Listed height: 6 ft 9 in (2.06 m)
- Listed weight: 220 lb (100 kg)

Career information
- High school: Somerset (Somerset, Massachusetts); Northfield Mount Hermon (Northfield, Massachusetts)
- College: Boston University (2004–2006); UMass (2007–2009)
- NBA draft: 2009: undrafted
- Playing career: 2009–2020
- Position: Power forward

Career history
- 2009: Hapoel Gilboa Galil
- 2010: Türk Telekom
- 2011: Utah Flash
- 2011–2012: Telekom Baskets Bonn
- 2012–2013: Joventut Badalona
- 2013–2014: Telekom Baskets Bonn
- 2014–2016: Hapoel Jerusalem
- 2016–2017: Alba Berlin
- 2017: Chiba Jets Funabashi
- 2017–2018: Hapoel Tel Aviv
- 2018–2019: New Basket Brindisi
- 2019–2020: Ironi Nahariya

Career highlights
- Israeli League champion (2015); Israeli League Sixth Man of the Year (2015); 2× Israeli League All-Star (2018, 2020); NBDL All Defensive First Team (2011); 2× BBL All-Star (2012, 2014); Atlantic 10 Defensive Player of the Year (2009); Second-team All-Atlantic 10 (2009); Atlantic 10 All-Defensive Team (2009)
- Stats at NBA.com
- Stats at Basketball Reference

Anthony Joseph Gaffney Jr. (born November 14, 1984) is an American former professional basketball player. He played college basketball at the University of Massachusetts. During the 2008–09 season, he received numerous honors from the Atlantic 10 Conference including Defensive Player of the Year, All-Defensive Team, and Second Team all conference.

In 2021, he joined former UMass teammate Matt Hill as an assistant boys coach at New Bedford High School, and in 2023 became a Massachusetts high school basketball referee.

== Early life ==
Gaffney was born in Boston, Massachusetts, on November 14, 1984, and grew up in Berkley, Massachusetts. He played four years of high school basketball at Somerset High School in Somerset, Massachusetts. In 2002, Gaffney helped turn a 2–20 Raiders team into the 21–4 Massachusetts Division 2 South Sectional Champions. That season, Gaffney averaged 23 points, 12 rebounds, 7 assists and 11 blocks a game. He was rewarded for his strong play in his senior season with the title of the Eastern Athletic Conference Most Valuable Player, All State honors, and Rivals.com Massachusetts Player of the Year. After his senior season, Gaffney played a prep season at Northfield Mount Hermon School in Mount Hermon, Massachusetts. He averaged 13 points per game along with 8 rebounds, 4 assists and 4 blocks.

== College career ==
In his 2004–05 freshman season, Gaffney played in all 29 games for Boston University. He averaged 15.6 minutes, 3.1 points, 2.9 rebounds, 1 assist and 0.8 blocks a game. During the 2005–06 season, Gaffney averaged 17 minutes a game, 4.5 points, 3.2 rebounds, 0.8 assists and 0.5 blocks. After the season, Gaffney transferred to the University of Massachusetts. NCAA transfer rules forced him to sit out the 2006–07 season. He returned in 2007–08 to play thirty-three games with eight starts while averaging 20 minutes, 3.2 points, 4.8 rebounds, 0.6 assists, 1.1 steals and 1.7 blocks a game.

In thirty games in his senior season in 2008–09, Gaffney averaged 33.9 minutes, 11.5 points, 10.2 rebounds, 1.7 assists, 2 steals, and 3.8 blocks; his 3.8 blocks a game ranked him third in the nation. He is also the first person since Shelden Williams to have more than 100 blocks and 50 steals in one season. Gaffney's defensive play earned him the Atlantic 10 Defensive Player of the Year award, a spot on the A-10 All-Defensive Team, and a spot on the A-10 Second Team.

== Professional career ==
Gaffney trained at the IMG Basketball Academy for the 2009 NBA Draft. After going undrafted, Gaffney joined the 2009 Los Angeles Lakers Las Vegas Summer League team. Thanks to his strong play in Las Vegas, Gaffney was invited to the 2009–10 Lakers training camp. He was the final player waived (on October 25, 2009) to reach the opening day roster.

Gaffney then played for the Hapoel Gilboa Galil Elyon club in Israel, but, after injuring his foot, returned to the United States for treatment.

On April 13, 2010, Gaffney signed a contract with the Boston Celtics for the rest of the regular season and playoffs, and a non-guaranteed contract for the 2010–11 season. Gaffney was waived on October 1, 2010. Gaffney never appeared in a game for the Celtics.

In October 2010, he signed with Türk Telekom B.K. in Turkey, but left the team two months later.

On January 5, 2011, Gaffney was signed by the Utah Flash of the NBA Development League. Flash officials said they expected him to contribute right away, and, though signing at the All-star break, he produced 11.5 points, 7 rebounds and 2 blocks per game in being named NBDL All-Defensive First Team and honorable mention All-League.

In July 2011 Gaffney was signed by Telekom Baskets Bonn, BBL Germany, playing in the league's All Star game at the midway point of the Baskets' season, then ending the regular season as the only player in the top ten in the league both in blocks (first) and steals (5th), averaging 13 points and 6 rebounds. Gaffney was named All League by the website Eurobasket.com and to the First Team All League Defensive Team as well.

In July 2012 he was signed by Spanish side Joventut Badalona, a team he left on March 14 when, after a long period of no resolution, the team defaulted on his contract due to financial issues. At the end of the season, Gaffney was in the top 7 in the ACB league in rebounding (5.91), efficiency (15.3), and in the top 4 in both blocked shots and steals while averaging 11.5 ppg, the only player in the league in the top 10 in each category. Gaffney was named in the weekly Top 6 four times and MVP once.

In September 2013, Gaffney signed with the Memphis Grizzlies. However, he was waived on October 26, the final player to be waived before the regular season.

Gaffney returned to Germany to play for Telekom Baskets Bonn, where his all-around play was rewarded when he was voted by the fans as a starter in the 2013–2014 BBL Germany All-Star game, and named to the All Defensive First Team by the website Eurobasket.com. Leading Bonn in minutes and calling the defenses from the floor, Gaffney ended the season averaging 12 points, 6 rebounds and 1.3 blocks and 1.3 steals per game as Bonn was eliminated in the playoffs by Oldenburg.

In September 2014, Gaffney signed a two-year contract (with a team option for year two) to play with Hapoel Jerusalem B.C., which won the 2014–15 Championship for the first time in league history. With league limitations as to foreign players on the floor simultaneously, Gaffney was awarded Israeli Super League 6th Man of the Year and was a finalist for Israeli Super League Defensive Player of the Year. During the 2015–16 season in which Jerusalem lost in the Championship Finals, Gaffney averaged 10 ppg and 6 rpg and led the league in 2-point percentage while shooting 33% from 3. As a starter, he was again a finalist for Israeli Super League Defensive Player of the Year.

On September 12, 2016, Gaffney signed with Alba Berlin for the 2016–17 season.

On July 26, 2017, Gaffney signed with the Japanese B.League club Chiba Jets Funabashi for the 2017–18 season. However, on November 25, 2017, Gaffney parted ways with Chiba Jets Funabashi to join Hapoel Tel Aviv for the rest of the season, joining his former head-coach Danny Franco and teammates Tywain McKee and Rafi Menco. On December 2, 2017, Gaffney made his debut in a 95–86 win over Maccabi Rishon LeZion, recording 23 points, five rebounds, three steals and three blocks off the bench. Three days later, Gaffney was named Israeli League Round 8 MVP. On February 19, 2018, Gaffney was voted as a starter for the 2018 Israeli All-Star Game. Gaffney helped Hapoel reach the 2018 Israeli League Final Four for the first time in 13 years.

On August 6, 2018, Gaffney signed a one-year deal with the Italian team New Basket Brindisi. Gaffney helped Brindisi reach the 2019 LBA Playoffs, where they eventually were eliminated by Dinamo Sassari.

On June 25, 2019, Gaffney returned to Israel for a third stint, signing a one-year deal with Ironi Nahariya. As the lone Captain, the only foreign Captain in the 50-year history of the franchise, Gaffney led Nahariya for the first time in the team's history to the Finals of the Israeli Basketball State Cup.
