= Guerino Vanoli Basket =

Vanoli Cremona
- Founded: 1999; 27 years ago
- Dissolved: 12 May 2026; 6 months ago
- History: Gruppo Triboldi Basket (1999–2011); Guerino Vanoli Basket (2011–2026)
- Arena: PalaRadi
- Capacity: 3,519
- Location: Cremona, Italy
- Team colors: White, Sky Blue, Navy
- Championships: 1 Italian Cup
Home	Away	Third

Guerino Vanoli Basket, also known as Vanoli Cremona, was a professional basketball team of the city of Cremona. The team played in the LBA, the top Italian basketball league, for 16 seasons from 2009 to 2022, and again 2023 to 2026 (only one season in between when they were relegated to Serie A2 in the 2022–23 season). From 1999 to 2011 Vanoli had the name of Gruppo Triboldi Basket. On May 29, 2026, it was announced that a group of investors—including NBA superstar Luka Dončić, former Dallas Mavericks executive Donnie Nelson, longtime coach Valerio Bianchini and former player Rimantas Kaukėnas—had purchased the team and rebranded it as BC Roma.

== History ==
=== The beginnings and the promotion to Serie A ===
The U.S. Gruppo Triboldi Basket was founded in 1999 in Soresina by Secondo Triboldi. The team, with Simone Lottici as coach, soon reached the Serie B d’Eccellenza, the third Italian league. Not having a suitable arena for this league, the club moved to the nearby indoor stadium in Cremona Cà de Somenzi, keeping the seat in Soresina. After five seasons in the third Italian league, in the 2005–06 season arrived the promotion in Legadue with Andrea Trinchieri on the bench, finishing first in the group A, and after winning the play-offs by beating in order Cento, Forlì and Osimo. The first year in Legadue, Gruppo Triboldi finished the regular season in fourth place, being eliminated in the first round of the playoffs by Pavia. At the end of the season Trinchieri left the role of head coach and moved to Caserta, being replaced by Stefano Cioppi. After a fifth place in the following season and elimination in playoffs semifinals by Caserta, the club achieved the promotion to Serie A after finishing the 2008–2009 season in third place and winning the play-offs beating in order Pavia, Casale Monferrato and Sassari.

=== The Serie A debut ===
After the promotion to Serie A, some managers of Juvi Cremona (which gives the Serie A Dilettanti's title to Leonessa Brescia) entered in the company. Moreover, the company's registered office was transferred from Soresina to Cremona. At the end of the first season in Serie A, ended with the 13th place in the standings, the General Manager Ario Costa and Vice President Matteo Bonetti left the team to join Leonessa Brescia in Serie A Dilettanti, the third Italian league, so the owner Secondo Triboldi decided to appoint as General Manager Flavio Portaluppi, who had played in the team just two seasons before, after a year spent at Olimpia Milano. The coach for the 2010-11 season is Slovenian Tomo Mahorič.

=== The change of ownership and the following seasons in Serie A ===
==== The 2011–2012 season ====
At the end of the 2010–11 season, after the club achieved the 12th place, the President Secondo Triboldi resigned from his office and gave his titles away for free. In September, 2011 Aldo Vanoli became President of the team and called it Guerino Vanoli Basket, in honor of his father.

For the 2011–12 season most of the previous year team is confirmed, included the coach Tomo Mahorič. In Cremona arrived among the others Jonathan Tabu, replacing E. J. Rowland, passed meanwhile to Unicaja Malaga and especially Von Wafer, who had previously played in the NBA. The beginning of the season, however, is rather disappointing with four defeats and one victory, against the newly promoted Casale Monferrato in the first five matches. Because of these results, after only a month Tomo Mahorič was fired and in its place arrived Attilio Caja, former coach of Cremona in the second half of the 2009-10 season. In the first days of December the team's top scorer, Von Wafer, returned in the NBA as a result of the end of the lockout. During the following months the team changed several players but the results, despite some good performances, remained erratic especially away and the team occupied the last positions of the standings. After the defeat against Casale Monferrato, which seemed to compromise the stay in Serie A, the trend of the season suddenly changes. Since the beginning of February the team, led by the newly arrived Jason Rich, won nine of the last thirteen league games, beating even teams ranked high such as Virtus Bologna and Olimpia Milano. Thanks to these results, the team managed to avoid relegation with a few match in advance and finished the season in 10th place, the best result in the history of the club.

==== The 2012–2013 season ====
Although the disappearance of the company due to lack of funds sounded almost certain, at the end of the season the club stayed alive thanks to new sponsors and regularly began the 2012-13 season. Coach Attilio Caja was confirmed, while the General Manager Portaluppi went back to Olimpia Milano. Due to the low budget, the club acquires player mostly from Legadue, the second Italian League. In September, the Italian point guard Luca Vitali, a member of the Italian National Team, joined the team. The season started badly, with the team occupying the last positions in the standings. Caja was fired on November 21, 2012. Luigi Gresta, the assistant coach, took his place. Luca Vitali soon became the leader of the team and lead the team right up to the play-off zone, thanks to some victories against top teams, such as Sassari, Milano and the Italian champions in charge of Siena. Apart from Vitali, also other players such as Jarrius Jackson, Hrvoje Perić and Andrija Stipanović had a very positive impact for the team. Cremona ended the season in 11th place.

==== The 2013–2014 season ====
In the summer the club had to face an economic crisis which seemed to prevent the team to play in the top Italian League the following year. At the end, a group of local entrepreneurs entered in the society and helped economically the President Aldo Vanoli. For the fifth consecutive year the club joined Serie A. The coaching staff, led by Luigi Gresta, was confirmed but almost all the players of the past year went away. Particularly, the two top players, Vitali and Peric, joined the same team, the Italian Reyer Venezia. The team acquired some prestigious players such as Jason Rich, the hero of the 2011–12 season and Ben Woodside, who had been the previous year the best assistman throughout Europe. Despite this signatures, the club get lower results than expected so, after two wins in nine games, coach Gresta was fired. The hiring of the experienced coach Cesare Pancotto changed the season. After four initial loss, the team won the following four matches and managed to get a quiet second half of the season. Cremona ended in the 14th place.

==== The 2018–2019 season ====
Vanoli Cremona was qualified for the 2019 Italian Basketball Cup. Cremona defeated Varese 82–73 in the quarterfinals and then they topped Virtus Bologna 102–91. Cremona went to win its first Cup ever by beating New Basket Brindisi 83–74 in the Finals. Drew Crawford was named Panasonic MVP of the competition.

On 12 July 2020, Vanoli Basket announced the club intended to leave the LBA after a period of 11 years due to a lack of economic support. On 27 July, the club announced it stayed in the Serie A after fundraising support was found.

History of Guerino Vanoli Basket
- 1999: Foundation of U.S. Gruppo Triboldi Basket.

- 2001–02: 7° place in group A of Serie B d'Eccellenza, eliminated in the play-offs by Teramo.
- 2002–03: 3° place in group A of Serie B d'Eccellenza, eliminated in play-offs final by Montecatini.
- 2003–04: 11° place in group A of Serie B d'Eccellenza, save by beating in play-outs Virtus Siena.
- 2004–05: 3° place in group A of Serie B d'Eccellenza, eliminated in play-offs by Forlì.
- 2005–06: 1° place in group A of Serie B d'Eccellenza, promoted in Legadue after play-offs.
- 2006–07: 4° place in Legadue, eliminated in play-offs by Pavia.
- 2007–08: 5° place in Legadue, eliminated in play-offs by Caserta.
- 2008–09: 3° place in Legadue, promoted in Serie A after play-offs.
- 2009: Company transfer from Soresina to Cremona.
- 2009-10: 13° place in Serie A.
- 2010-11: 12° place in Serie A.
- 2011: Change of name in Guerino Vanoli Basket.

- 2011–12: 10° place in Serie A.
- 2012–13: 11° place in Serie A.
- 2013–14: 14° place in Serie A.
- 2014–15: 12° place in Serie A.
- 2015–16: 4° place in Serie A, eliminated in the play-offs by Umana Reyer Venezia.
- 2016–17: 16° place in Serie A.
- 2017–18: 8° place in Serie A, eliminated in the play-offs by Umana Reyer Venezia.
- 2018–19: Italian Cup champions. 2nd place in Serie A. Eliminated in the play-offs Semifinals by Umana Reyer Venezia.
- 2019–20: 6° place in Serie A.
- 2020–21: 10° place in Serie A
- 2021–22: 16th place in Serie A, relegated to Serie A2
- 2022–23: 1st place in Serie A2, promoted to Serie A
- 2023–24: 11th place in Serie A
- 2024–25: 13th place in Serie A
- 2025–26: 11th place in Serie A, final season

== Notable players ==
Note: Flags indicate national team eligibility at FIBA-sanctioned events. Players may hold other non-FIBA nationalities not displayed.

Criteria

To appear in this section a player must have either:

- Set a club record or won an individual award while at the club
- Played at least one official international match for their national team at any time
- Played at least one official NBA match at any time.

- (United States) Keith Langford (2006–2007)
- (Italy) Dante Calabria (2008–2009)
- (United States) Troy Bell (2008–2010)
- (United States) E. J. Rowland (2009–2011)
- (Montenegro) Blagota Sekulić (2010–2011)
- (United States) Von Wafer (2011)
- (Greece) Michalis Kakiouzis (2011)
- (Slovenia) Marko Milic (2010–2012)
- (Finland) Tuukka Kotti (2012–2013)
- (Finland) Topias Palmi (2019–2021)
- (Bosnia and Herzegovina) Andrija Stipanović (2012–2013)
- (United States) Jason Rich (2012, 2013–2014)
- (Albania) Klaudio Ndoja (2013–2014)
- (Italy) Marco Cusin (2007–2010, 2014–2016)
- (Italy) Luca Vitali (2012–2013, 2014–2016)
- (United States) Drake Diener (2017–2018)
- (Italy) Travis Diener (2017–2020)
- (United States) Jalen Harris (2021–2022)
- (Italy) Giuseppe Poeta (2020–2022)
- (Belgium) Jonathan Tabu (2022–2023)
- (South Sudan) Mangok Mathiang (2018–2019)

== Head coaches ==
- (Italy) Andrea Trinchieri (2004–2007)
- (Italy) Stefano Cioppi (2007–2010)
- (Slovenia) Tomislav Mahoric (2010–2011)
- (Italy) Attilio Caja (2010, 2011–2012)
- (Italy) Cesare Pancotto (2013–2016)
- (Italy) Romeo Sacchetti (2017–2020)
- (Italy) Paolo Galbiati (2020–2022)
- (Italy) Demis Cavina (2022–2024)
- (Italy) Pierluigi Brotto (2024–2026)

== Sponsorship names ==
Through the years, due to sponsorship deals, it has been also known as:

- Tamoil Soresina (1999–2003)
- Vanoli Soresina (2003–2009)
- Vanoli Cremona (2009–2010)
- Vanoli-Braga Cremona (2010–2012)
- Vanoli Cremona (2012–2026)
