= 2010–11 Lega Basket Serie A =

Lega Basket Serie A
- Season: 2010–11
- Dates: October 16, 2010 – June 19, 2011
- Teams: 16

Regular season
- Season MVP: (United States) Omar Thomas
- Relegated: Enel Brindisi

Finals
- Champions: Montepaschi Siena (6th title)
- Runners-up: Bennet Cantù
- Finals MVP: (North Macedonia) Bo McCalebb

Statistical leaders
Points	(United States) James White	20.2
Rebounds	(United States) Sharrod Ford	10.4
Assists	(North Macedonia) Marques Green	6.8

The 2010–11 Lega Basket Serie A was the 89th season of the Lega Basket Serie A, the top level basketball league in Italy. The season from October 16, 2010, till June 19, 2011. Montepaschi Siena won its 6th title.

== Teams ==
- Air Avellino
- Angelico Biella
- Armani Jeans Milano
- Banca Tercas Teramo
- Benetton Treviso
- Bennet Cantù
- Canadian Solar Bologna
- Cimberio Varese
- Dinamo Sassari
- Enel Brindisi
- Fabi Shoes Montegranaro
- Lottomatica Roma
- Montepaschi Siena
- Pepsi Caserta
- Scavolini Siviglia Pesaro
- Vanoli-Braga Cremona
Lega Basket 2010–11 – Club Locations

== Regular season ==
=== Standings ===
	Team	Pts	Pld	W	L	PF	PA	Qualification
1	Montepaschi Siena	52	30	26	4	2514	2159	Qualified for the Playoffs
2	Bennet Cantù	44	30	22	8	2311	2132	Qualified for the Playoffs
3	Armani Jeans Milano	42	30	21	9	2409	2295	Qualified for the Playoffs
4	Air Avellino	34	30	17	13	2468	2378	Qualified for the Playoffs
5	Benetton Treviso	34	30	17	13	2311	2252	Qualified for the Playoffs
6	Dinamo Sassari	30	30	15	15	2463	2512	Qualified for the Playoffs
7	Cimberio Varese	30	30	15	15	2385	2430	Qualified for the Playoffs
8	Canadian Solar Bologna	30	30	15	15	2345	2358	Qualified for the Playoffs
9	Lottomatica Roma	28	30	14	16	2323	2262	
10	Scavolini Siviglia Pesaro	28	30	14	16	2186	2260	
11	Pepsi Caserta	24	30	12	18	2395	2422	
12	Vanoli-Braga Cremona	24	30	12	18	2384	2395	
13	Fabi Shoes Montegranaro	22	30	11	19	2314	2382	
14	Angelico Biella	22	30	11	19	2393	2487	
15	Banca Tercas Teramo	20	30	10	20	2253	2458	
16	Enel Brindisi	16	30	8	22	2194	2466	Relegation

== Play-offs ==
Quarterfinals
1	Montepaschi Siena	3
8	Canadian Solar Bologna	1
4	Air Avellino	1
5	Benetton Treviso	3
2	Bennet Cantù	3
7	Cimberio Varese	0
3	EA7 Emporio Armani Milano	3
6	Dinamo Sassari	1

Semifinals
1	Montepaschi Siena	3
5	Benetton Treviso	0
2	Bennet Cantù	3
3	EA7 Emporio Armani Milano	1

Final
1	Montepaschi Siena	4
2	Bennet Cantù	1
