= PalaTrieste =

Sporting arena in Trieste, Italy

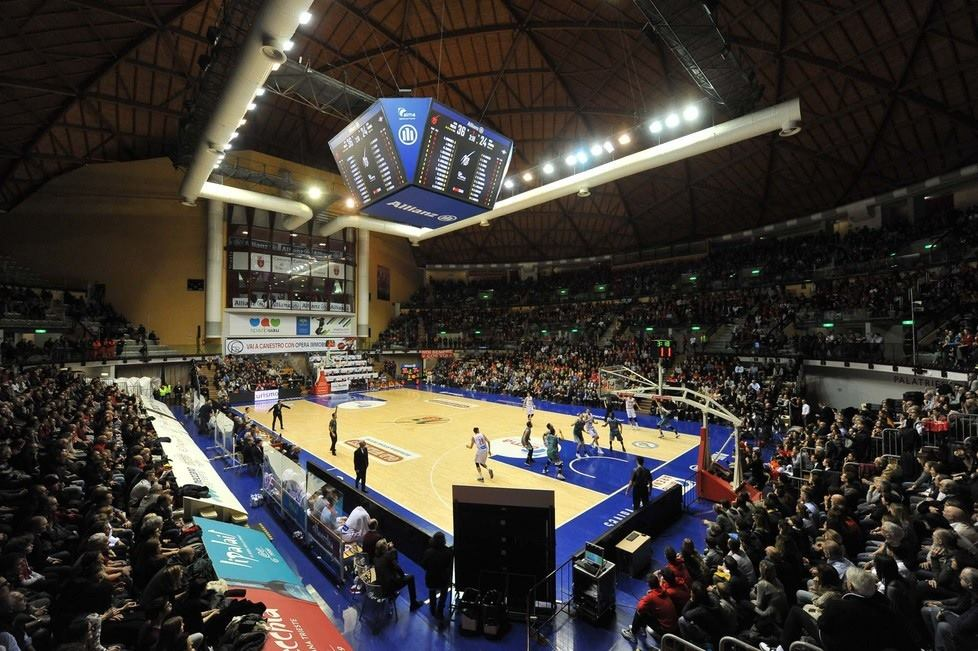
- The central arena during a home match (2018)
- Interactive map of PalaTrieste
- Full name: Palazzo Dello Sport Cesare Rubini di Trieste
- Former names: Palazzo Dello Sport di Trieste (1999-2011); Alma Arena (2017-2018)
- Location: Via Flavia, 3 34100 TRIESTE (TS), Italy
- Coordinates: 45°37′21.99″N 13°47′41.84″E
- Owner: City of Trieste
- Capacity: 6,943 (Basketball)
- Surface: Parquet

Construction
- Built: 1994-1999
- Opened: 1999
- Architect: Studio TECO+ Partners (Bologna)

Tenant
- Pallacanestro Trieste (LBA) (1999-present)

PalaTrieste, officially known as Palazzo dello sport Cesare Rubini is an indoor sporting arena located in Trieste, Italy. Opened in 1999, it has a seating capacity for 6,943 people and is currently home for Pallacanestro Trieste basketball team.

== History ==
=== Allianz sponsorship ===
All started when, in 2015, Allianz became new top sponsor of the Italian basketball team Pallacanestro Trieste, based in PalaTrieste.

In 2017, the German insurance company sponsored a new parquet basketball court, and later in 2018, a new scoreboard called Allianz Wall was installed in the Trieste arena.

In 2018 Allianz signed a deal to become new title sponsor of the arena, so PalaTrieste officially became Allianz Dome until 2023.

== Gallery ==
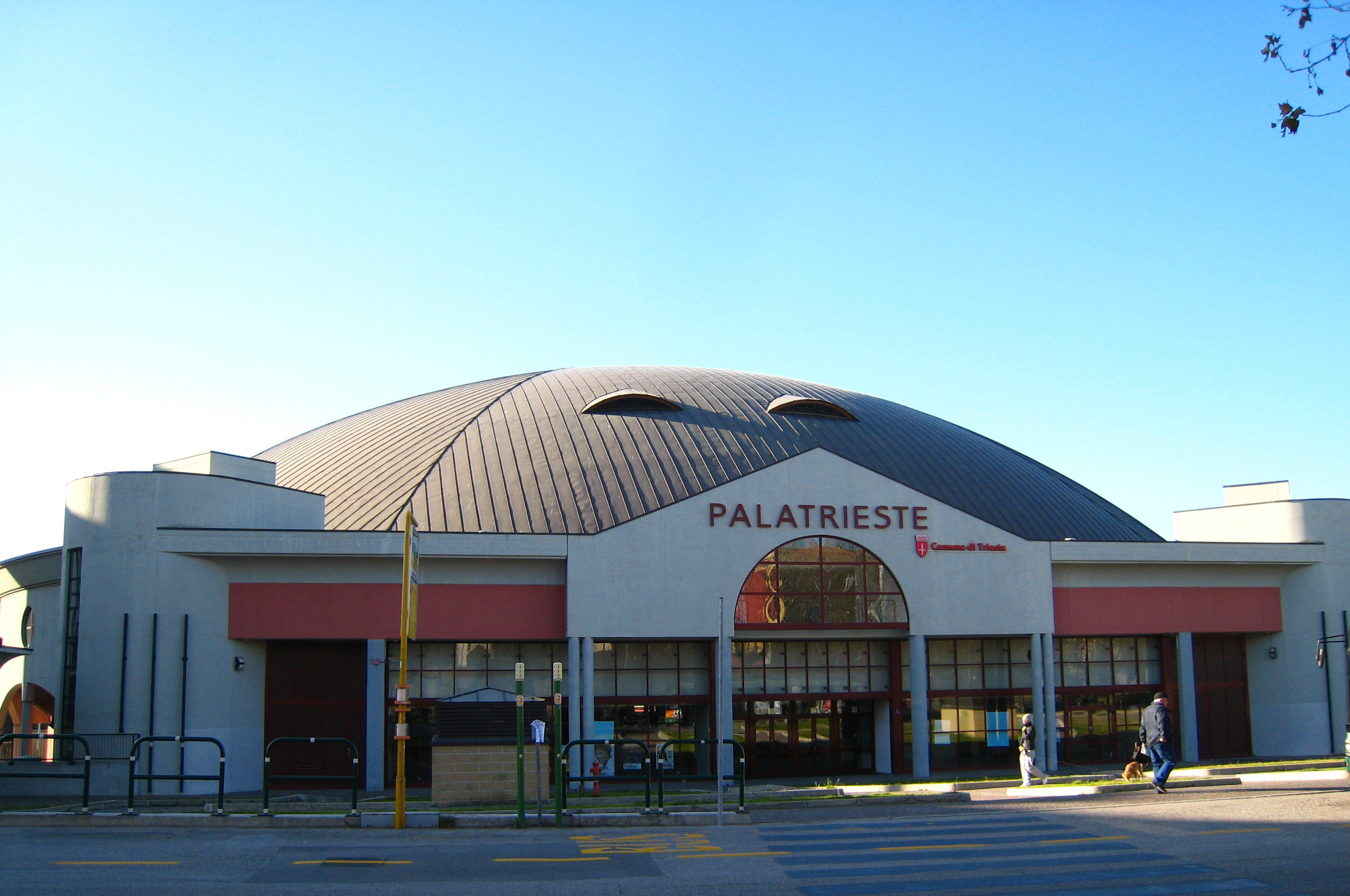
PalaTrieste before the Allianz sponsorship (2007)

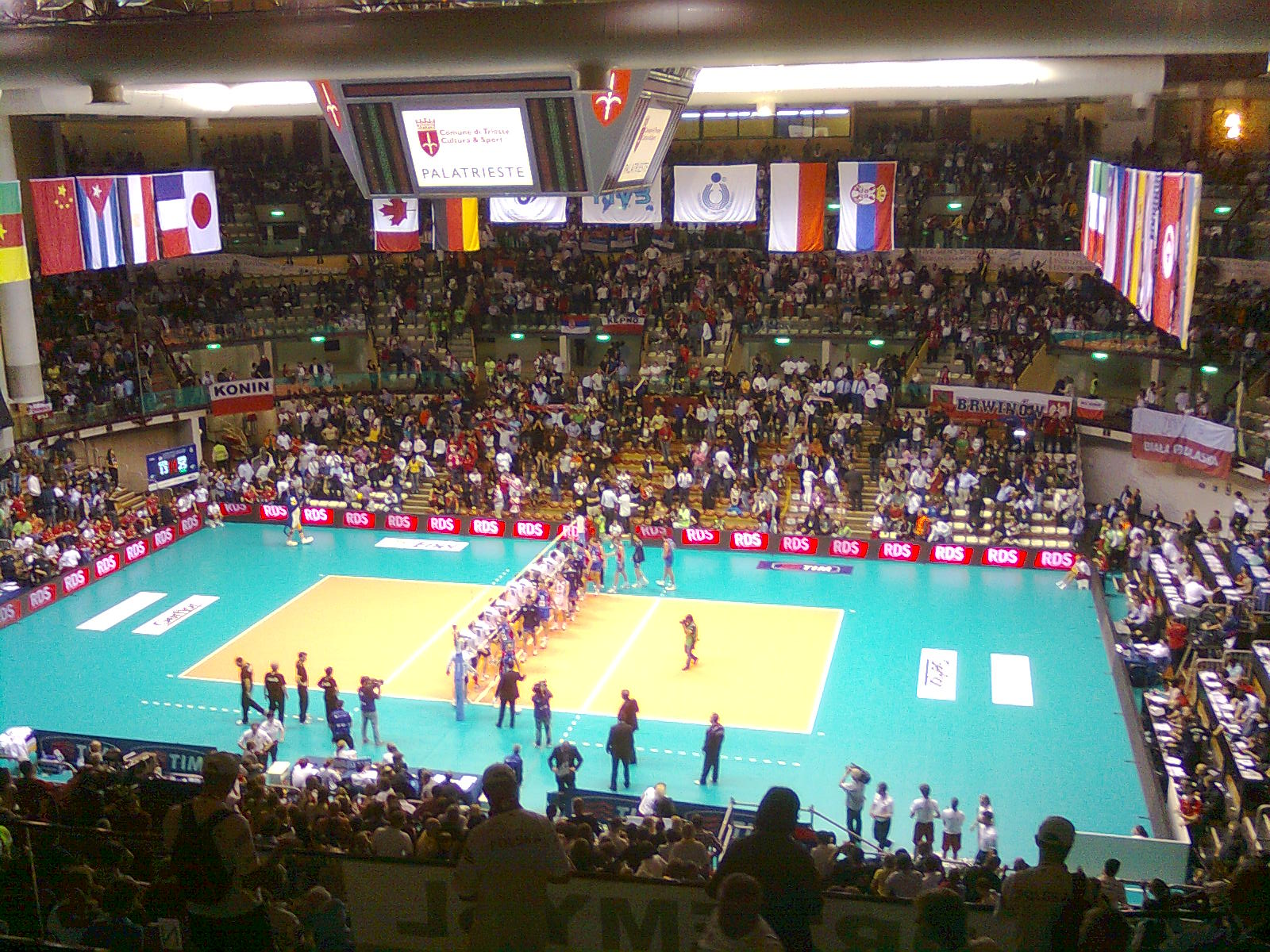
PalaTrieste during a volleyball match before new Allianz Wall (2010)

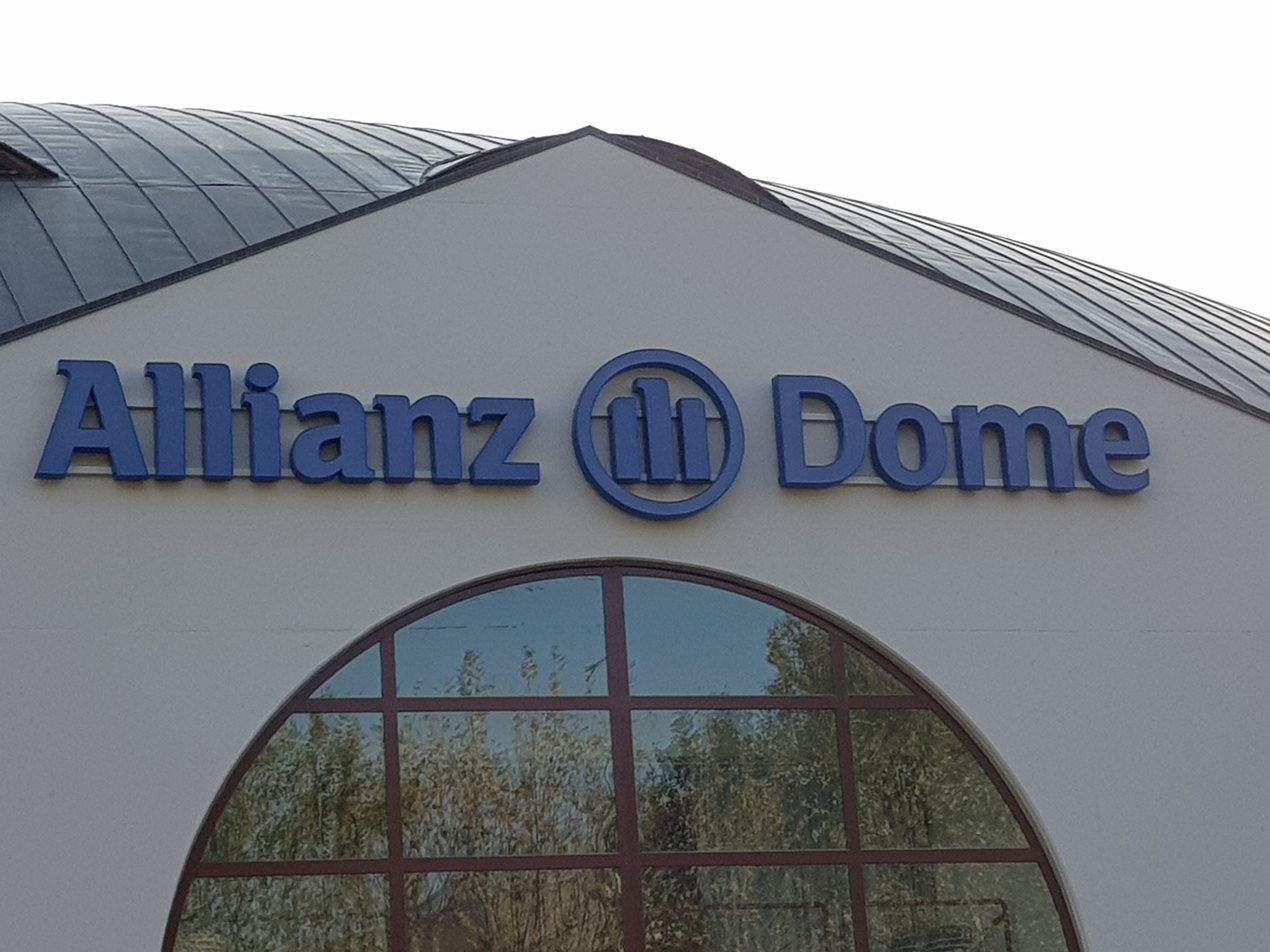
New Allianz Dome logo outside the arena

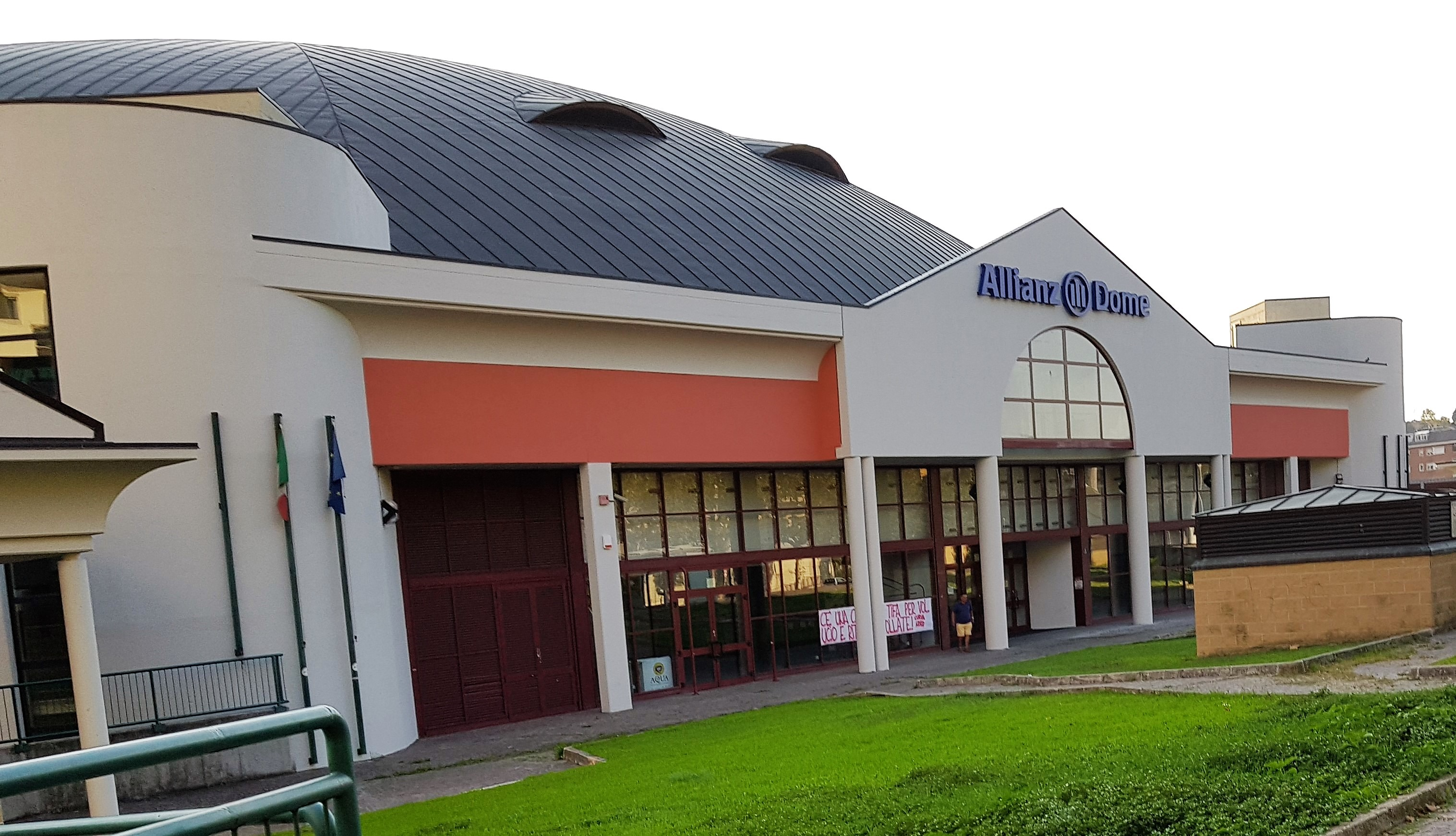
Allianz Dome facade

== See also ==
- List of indoor arenas
- List of basketball arenas
