= Adrian Banks =

American-Israeli former basketball player and coach (born 1986)

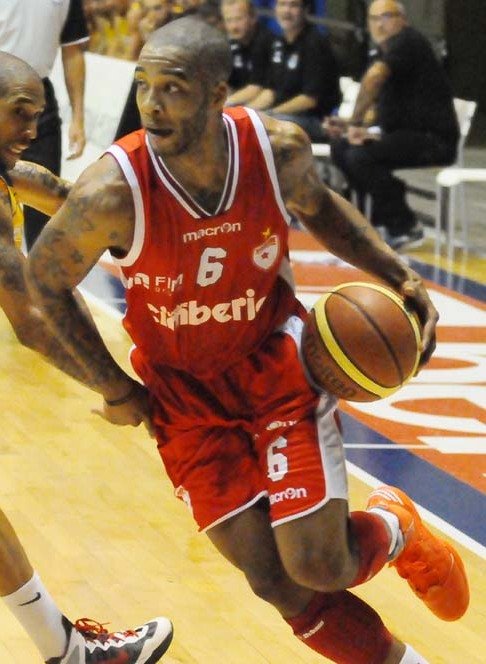
- Banks with Varese in 2012

Personal information
- Born: February 9, 1986 (age 40) Memphis, Tennessee, U.S.
- Listed height: 1.91 m (6 ft 3 in)
- Listed weight: 88 kg (194 lb)

Career information
- High school: Trezevant (Memphis, Tennessee)
- College: Northwest Mississippi CC (2004–2006); Arkansas State (2006–2008)
- NBA draft: 2008: undrafted
- Playing career: 2008–2025
- Position: Shooting guard
- Coaching career: 2025–present

Career history

Playing
- 2008–2009: Verviers-Pepinster
- 2009–2010: Liège
- 2010–2012: Barak Netanya
- 2012–2013: Varese
- 2013: Hapoel Gilboa Galil
- 2013–2014: Varese
- 2014–2015: Scandone Avellino
- 2015–2016: Brindisi
- 2016–2018: Hapoel Tel Aviv
- 2018–2020: Brindisi
- 2020–2021: Fortitudo Bologna
- 2021–2022: Trieste
- 2022–2023: Treviso Basket
- 2023: Fortitudo Bologna
- 2023–2024: Bnei Herzliya

Coaching
- 2025–present: Unity School

Career highlights
- LBA Top Scorer (2020); Israeli League Sixth Man of the Year (2018); Israeli League Top Scorer (2012); 3× Israeli League All-Star (2011, 2012, 2018)

Adrian Gerard Banks (Hebrew: אדריאן ג'רארד בנקס; born February 9, 1986) is an American-Israeli former professional basketball player and current coach for Unity School. He played college basketball for Northwest Mississippi Community College and Arkansas State University. He was the 2011–12 top scorer in the Israel Basketball Premier League.

== Coaching career ==
In 2025, Banks began his coaching career at Unity School.

== Personal life ==
Banks married his American-Jewish girlfriend, Rachel Colburn. On April 24, 2017, Banks received an Israeli passport.

== College career ==
Banks played junior college basketball at Northwest Mississippi Community College before moving to Arkansas State University, where he became the seventh player in the history of college to score more than 1,000 points.

== Professional career ==
Banks moved to Belgium in 2008, signing his first professional contract in 2008, signing with Pepinster, where he played 31 games, averaging 16.8 points and 2.2 rebounds per game.

The following year, he moved to Liège where he played in EuroChallenge.

In 2010, he moved to Israeli side Barak Netanya. He closed the year as the top scorer of the League with more than 21.5 points (49.4% two, 35.2% from three, 82.5% for free) and 3.2 assists per game, and he won the dunk contest at the 2012 All Star game. He was the 2011–12 top scorer in the Israel Basketball Premier League.

On July 25, 2012, Banks signed a one-year contract with Cimberio Varese. In Italy he won the regular season with his team and led the team to the playoffs.

In August 2013, he signed with Hapoel Gilboa Galil. He was waived on November 8, 2013. On November 22, he returned to Cimberio Varese signing a contract for the rest of the season.

On July 1, 2014, he signed with Sidigas Avellino.

The next year, in July 2015, Banks joined fellow Serie A side Enel Brindisi. On March 6, 2016, Banks recorded a career-high 33 points, shooting 12-of-18 from the field, along with three rebounds and four assists in an 81–76 win over Pesaro.

On August 2, 2016, Banks returned for a third stint in Israel, signing a two-year deal with Hapoel Tel Aviv. In his second season with the team, Banks helped Hapoel reach the 2018 Israeli League Final Four, where they eventually lost to Maccabi Tel Aviv. In 38 games played during the 2017–18 season, Banks averaged 11.3 points, 2.3 rebounds, and 1.9 assists per game. On June 8, 2018, Banks was named 2018 Israeli League Sixth Man of the Year.

On July 17, 2018, Banks returned to Enel Brindisi for a second stint, signing a two-year deal. In September 2018, he was named team captain for the 2018–19 season. On June 11, 2020, he signed with Fortitudo Bologna.

Fortitudo Bologna and Banks mutually consented to part ways and on June 14, 2021, Fortitudo announced his release. On July 14 he signed with Pallacanestro Trieste.

On July 8, 2022, he has signed with Treviso Basket of the Lega Basket Serie A (LBA).

On November 11, 2023, he signed with Bnei Herzliya of the Israeli Basketball Premier League.

== Personal life ==
Banks married his American-Jewish girlfriend, Rachel Colburn. On April 24, 2017, Banks received an Israeli passport.
