= Ike Udanoh =

American-Nigerian basketball player (born 1989)

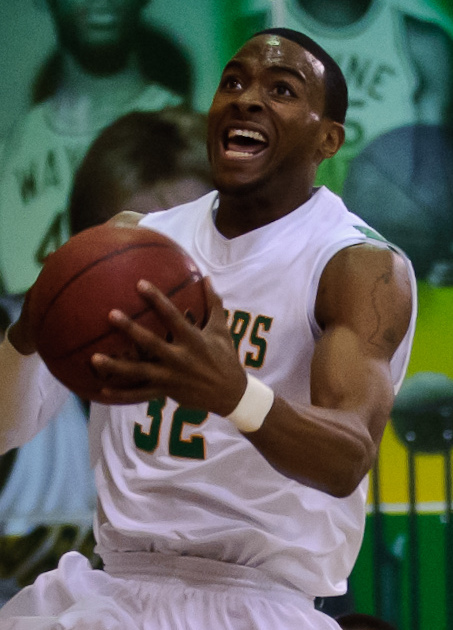
- Udanoh with Wayne State in 2011

Free Agent
- Position: Power forward

Personal information
- Born: August 2, 1989 (age 37) Detroit, Michigan
- Listed height: 2.02 m (6 ft 8 in)
- Listed weight: 107 kg (236 lb)

Career information
- High school: Warren Woods Tower (Warren, Michigan)
- College: LIU Brooklyn (2007–2009); Wayne State (2009–2012)
- NBA draft: 2012: undrafted
- Playing career: 2012–present

Career history
- 2012–2013: Larre Borges
- 2013: Al Ahli Doha
- 2013: Flyers Wels
- 2014: Bisons Loimaa
- 2014–2015: Tapiolan Honka
- 2015–2016: Bisons Loimaa
- 2016: Pallacanestro Ferrara
- 2016: Pallacanestro Mantovana
- 2016–2017: Hyères-Toulon
- 2017–2018: Astana
- 2018–2019: Pallacanestro Cantù
- 2019: Sidigas Avellino
- 2019–2020: Reyer Venezia
- 2020–2021: Pallacanestro Trieste
- 2021–2023: SIG Strasbourg
- 2023: Telekom Baskets Bonn
- 2023–2024: Limoges CSP

Career highlights
- VTB United League rebounding leader (2018); Kazakhstan League champion (2018); Kazakhstan Cup winner (2018); First-team All-GLIAC (2012); GLIAC All-Defensive Team (2012)

Ike Joseph Udanoh (born August 2, 1989) is an American-Nigerian professional basketball player who last played for Limoges CSP of the LNB Pro A. He is a 6 ft 8 in (2.03 m) power forward.

== Professional career ==
On June 11, 2018, Udanoh signed a deal with Italian club Pallacanestro Cantù. On August 23, 2018, he was named team captain.

On February 24, 2019 he has signed with Sidigas Avellino of the Italian Lega Basket Serie A (LBA).

On July 7, 2019, he has signed with Reyer Venezia of the Italian Lega Basket Serie A (LBA).

On June 23, 2020, he continued to play in Italy and signed with Pallacanestro Trieste.

On January 7, 2021, he transfers to the LNB Pro A in France, signing with SIG Strasbourg.

On December 18, 2023, he signed with Limoges CSP of the LNB Pro A.
