= Palasport Mario Radi =

Indoor arena in Cremona, Italy

Coordinates: 45.1511°N 10.0341°E

PalaRadi
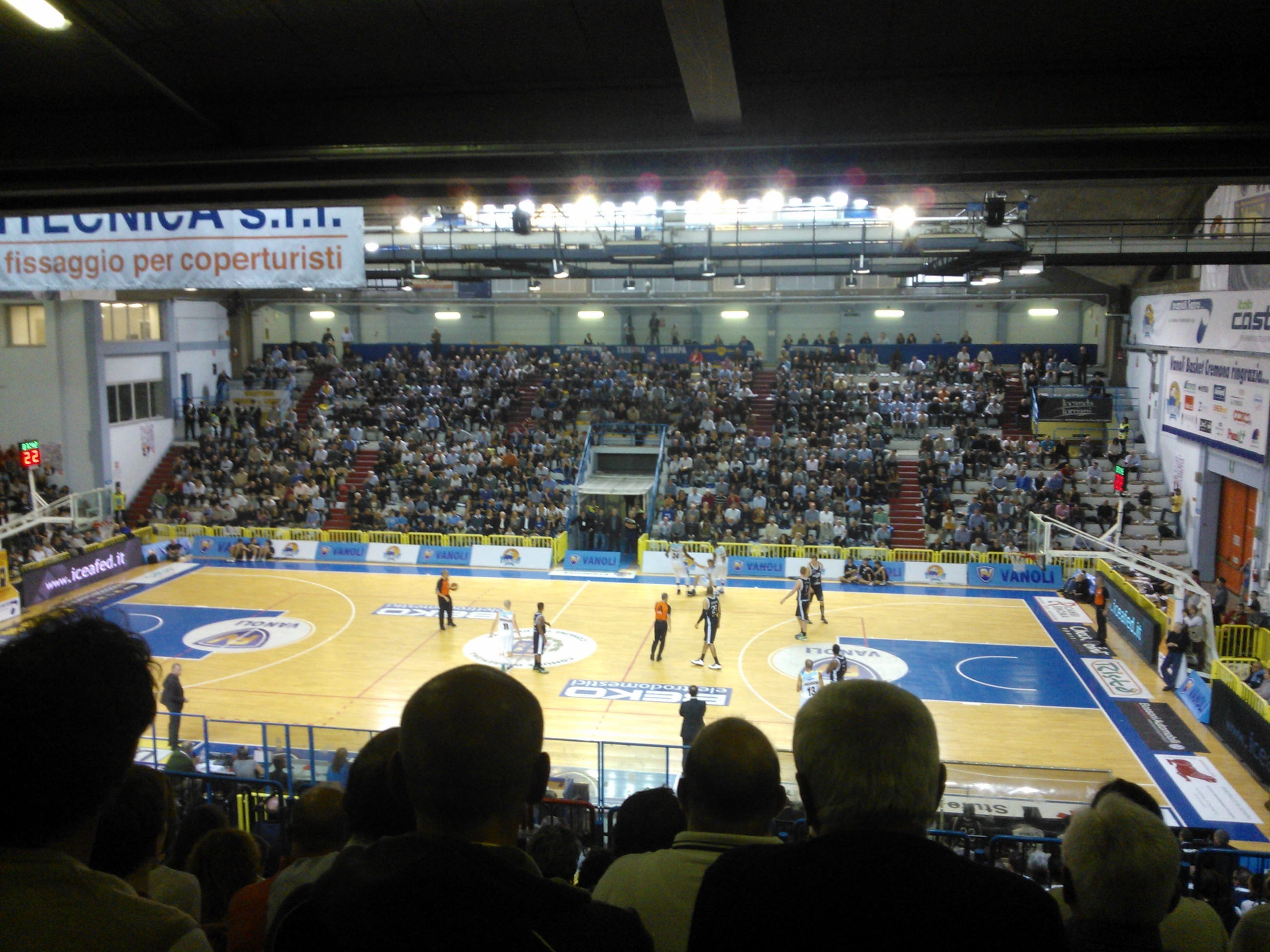
- Interactive map of PalaRadi
- Full name: Palasport "Mario Radi"
- Former names: Palasport "Ca' de Somenzi"
- Address: Piazza Zelioli Lanzini Ennio 1, Cremona, Italy
- Owner: Comune di Cremona
- Capacity: Basketball: 3,519; Concerts: 3,498
- Surface: Parquet

Construction
- Opened: 1980
- Renovated: 2009

Tenants
- Vanoli Cremona; Pomì Casalmaggiore

The PalaRadi (officially Palasport Mario Radi, formerly known as Palasport Ca' de Somenzi) is an indoor arena located in Cremona, Italy. The capacity of the arena is 3,519 people and it opened in 1980. It is the home of Vanoli Cremona of the Lega Basket Serie A and Pomì Casalmaggiore of the Women's volleyball Serie A1. The venue capacity was first increased in the eighties to 2,918 spectators, and then to 3,519 after a second renovation in 2009, in which the arena was also renamed after Mario Radi.
