= 2019 LBA Finals =

Former championship series in Italy

Team	Coach	Wins
Umana Reyer Venezia	Walter De Raffaele	4
Banco di Sardegna Sassari	Gianmarco Pozzecco	3
- Dates: June 10–22, 2015
- MVP: (United States) Austin Daye

The 2019 LBA Finals was the championship series of the 2018–19 regular season, of the Lega Basket Serie A (LBA), known for sponsorship reasons as the Serie A PosteMobile, the highest professional basketball league in Italy, and the conclusion of the season's playoffs. The third placed Umana Reyer Venezia possessed home advantage (with the first two, the fifth and the seventh games at the Palasport Taliercio) and the 4th placed Banco di Sardegna Sassari contested for the title in a best-of-7 showdown, from June 10 to June 22, 2019.

These were the second Finals for both Venezia and Sassari of their history.

Umana Reyer Venezia won their 4th title by beating Banco di Sardegna Sassari in game 7 of the finals.

Austin Daye of the Umana Reyer Venezia was named MVP in the league's Finals series of the playoffs.

== Road to the finals ==
Umana Reyer Venezia		Banco di Sardegna Sassari
Pos / Team / Pld / W / L / PF / PA / PD; 1 / AX Armani Exchange Milano / 30 / 23 / 7 / 2609 / 2391 / +218; 2 / Vanoli Cremona / 30 / 20 / 10 / 2504 / 2360 / +144; 3 / Umana Reyer Venezia / 30 / 20 / 10 / 2440 / 2256 / +184; 4 / Banco di Sardegna Sassari / 30 / 18 / 12 / 2593 / 2436 / +157; 5 / New Basket Brindisi / 30 / 18 / 12 / 2454 / 2370 / +84; 6 / Dolomiti Energia Trento / 30 / 17 / 13 / 2383 / 2410 / −27; 7 / Alma Pallacanestro Trieste / 30 / 16 / 14 / 2634 / 2527 / +107; 8 / Sidigas Avellino / 30 / 16 / 14 / 2470 / 2456 / +14; 9 / Openjobmetis Varese / 30 / 16 / 14 / 2385 / 2284 / +101; 10 / Red October Cantù / 30 / 16 / 14 / 2526 / 2571 / −45; 11 / Segafredo Virtus Bologna / 30 / 15 / 15 / 2387 / 2410 / −23; 12 / Germani Basket Brescia / 30 / 14 / 16 / 2408 / 2443 / −35; 13 / Grissin Bon Reggio Emilia / 30 / 9 / 21 / 2363 / 2493 / −130; 14 / VL Pesaro / 30 / 7 / 23 / 2382 / 2754 / −372; 15 / OriOra Pistoia / 30 / 6 / 24 / 2253 / 2511 / −258; 16 / Fiat Torino / 30 / 9 / 21 / 2492 / 2611 / −119; Source: LBA 3rd best league record	Regular season	Pos / Team / Pld / W / L / PF / PA / PD; 1 / AX Armani Exchange Milano / 30 / 23 / 7 / 2609 / 2391 / +218; 2 / Vanoli Cremona / 30 / 20 / 10 / 2504 / 2360 / +144; 3 / Umana Reyer Venezia / 30 / 20 / 10 / 2440 / 2256 / +184; 4 / Banco di Sardegna Sassari / 30 / 18 / 12 / 2593 / 2436 / +157; 5 / New Basket Brindisi / 30 / 18 / 12 / 2454 / 2370 / +84; 6 / Dolomiti Energia Trento / 30 / 17 / 13 / 2383 / 2410 / −27; 7 / Alma Pallacanestro Trieste / 30 / 16 / 14 / 2634 / 2527 / +107; 8 / Sidigas Avellino / 30 / 16 / 14 / 2470 / 2456 / +14; 9 / Openjobmetis Varese / 30 / 16 / 14 / 2385 / 2284 / +101; 10 / Red October Cantù / 30 / 16 / 14 / 2526 / 2571 / −45; 11 / Segafredo Virtus Bologna / 30 / 15 / 15 / 2387 / 2410 / −23; 12 / Germani Basket Brescia / 30 / 14 / 16 / 2408 / 2443 / −35; 13 / Grissin Bon Reggio Emilia / 30 / 9 / 21 / 2363 / 2493 / −130; 14 / VL Pesaro / 30 / 7 / 23 / 2382 / 2754 / −372; 15 / OriOra Pistoia / 30 / 6 / 24 / 2253 / 2511 / −258; 16 / Fiat Torino / 30 / 9 / 21 / 2492 / 2611 / −119; Source: LBA 4th best league record
Defeated the 6th seeded Dolomiti Energia Trento, 3-2	Quarterfinals	Defeated the 2nd seeded Vanoli Cremona, 3-2
Defeated the 5th seeded New Basket Brindisi, 3-0	Semifinals	Defeated the 1st seeded AX Armani Exchange Milano, 3-0

=== Italian Basketball Cup ===
15 February 2018 Quarterfinals	Umana Reyer Venezia	88–89	Banco di Sardegna Sassari	Florence
18:00 (CET)	Scoring by quarter: 29–20, 28–21, 18–25, 13–23
Eurosport; Rai Sport	Pts: Tonut 20; Rebs: Watt 6 Asts: Haynes 8 PIR: Watt 22	Boxscore	Pts: Pierre 24; Rebs: Pierre 9 Asts: Spissu, McGee 2 PIR: Pierre 30	Arena: Nelson Mandela Forum; Referees: Roberto Begnis, Beniamino Manuel Attard, Mark Bartoli

=== Regular season series ===
10 November 2018	Banco di Sardegna Sassari	83–86	Umana Reyer Venezia	Sassari
20:00	Scoring by quarter: 23–11, 17–22, 20–29, 23–24
Eurosport, Rai Sport	Pts: Petteway 16; Rebs: Cooley 7 Asts: Smith 5 PIR: Polonara, Petteway 16	Boxscore	Pts: Daye 21; Rebs: Daye, Watt 5 Asts: Giuri 5 PIR: Daye 19	Arena: PalaSerradimigni; Referees: Saverio Lanzarini, Michele Rossi, Valerio Grigioni

10 March 2019	Umana Reyer Venezia	98–90	Banco di Sardegna Sassari	Mestre, Venice
19:05	Scoring by quarter: 27–23, 27–15, 21–23, 23–29
Eurosport	Pts: Stone 24; Rebs: Stone 6 Asts: Haynes 6 PIR: Stone 30	Boxscore	Pts: Smith 21; Rebs: Thomas 7 Asts: McGee, Thomas 4 PIR: Thomas 23	Arena: Palasport Taliercio; Referees: Carmelo Paternico', Maurizio Biggi, Gianluca Calbucci

== Series ==
=== Game 1 ===
10 June 2019	Umana Reyer Venezia	72–70 (Series: 1–0)	Banco di Sardegna Sassari	Mestre, Venice
20:45	Scoring by quarter: 18–14, 11–23, 25–15, 18–18
Eurosport, Rai Sport	Pts: Haynes 15; Rebs: Vidmar, Stone 4 Asts: Stone 3 PIR: Haynes 12	Boxscore	Pts: McGee 19; Rebs: Cooley 11; Asts: five players 2 PIR: McGee, Thomas 17	Arena: Palasport Taliercio; Referees: Massimiliano Filippini, Carmelo Lo Guzzo, Beniamino Manuel Attard

Starters:			Pts	Reb	Ast
PG	0	(Georgia (country)) MarQuez Haynes	15	3	2
PF	22	(Italy) Valerio Mazzola	3	3	1
SF	6	(Greece) Michael Bramos	8	3	1
SG	5	(United States) Julyan Stone	3	4	3
C	50	(United States) Mitchell Watt	14	3	0
Reserves:					
SG	7	(Italy) Stefano Tonut	11	2	2
PF	9	(United States) Austin Daye	8	2	2
PG	10	(Italy) Andrea De Nicolao	6	2	1
C	14	(Slovenia) Gašper Vidmar	1	4	0
C	19	(Italy) Paul Biligha	DNP		
PG	21	(Italy) Marco Giuri	0	0	1
SF	30	(Italy) Bruno Cerella	3	1	1
Head coach:
(Italian Basketball Federation) Walter De Raffaele

Umana Reyer Venezia	Banco di Sardegna Sassari

Starters:			Pts	Reb	Ast
PG	2	(United States) Jaime Smith	3	0	2
PF	25	(United States) Rashawn Thomas	13	9	2
SF	21	(United States) Justin Carter	7	2	0
SG	6	(Canada) Dyshawn Pierre	4	6	2
C	45	(United States) Jack Cooley	12	11	0
Reserves:					
PG	0	(Italy) Marco Spissu	0	4	2
SG	3	(United States) Tyrus McGee	19	3	2
SF	8	(Italy) Giacomo Devecchi	DNP		
C	15	(Italy) Daniele Magro	DNP		
SG	22	(Italy) Stefano Gentile	6	1	1
PF	33	(Italy) Achille Polonara	6	7	0
C	35	(Senegal) Ousmane Diop	DNP		
Head coach:
(Italian Basketball Federation) Gianmarco Pozzecco

=== Game 2 ===
12 June 2019	Umana Reyer Venezia	66–80 (Series: 1–1)	Banco di Sardegna Sassari	Mestre, Venice
20:45	Scoring by quarter: 17–21, 13–20, 22–25, 14–14
Eurosport, Rai Sport	Pts: Daye 20; Rebs: Daye 8 Asts: four players 2 PIR: Daye 15	Boxscore	Pts: Smith 19; Rebs: Cooley 11; Asts: Smith 6 PIR: Cooley 25	Arena: Palasport Taliercio; Referees: Tolga Sahin, Saverio Lanzarini, Luca Weidmann

Starters:			Pts	Reb	Ast
PG	0	(Georgia (country)) MarQuez Haynes	7	3	2
PF	22	(Italy) Valerio Mazzola	3	2	0
SF	6	(Greece) Michael Bramos	2	3	2
SG	5	(United States) Julyan Stone	3	5	2
C	50	(United States) Mitchell Watt	6	1	1
Reserves:					
SG	7	(Italy) Stefano Tonut	6	1	1
PF	9	(United States) Austin Daye	20	8	0
PG	10	(Italy) Andrea De Nicolao	3	0	1
C	14	(Slovenia) Gašper Vidmar	5	6	1
C	19	(Italy) Paul Biligha	0	0	0
PG	21	(Italy) Marco Giuri	8	1	2
SF	30	(Italy) Bruno Cerella	2	2	1
Head coach:
(Italian Basketball Federation) Walter De Raffaele

Umana Reyer Venezia	Banco di Sardegna Sassari

Starters:			Pts	Reb	Ast
PG	2	(United States) Jaime Smith	19	1	6
PF	25	(United States) Rashawn Thomas	11	6	0
SF	21	(United States) Justin Carter	0	1	0
SG	6	(Canada) Dyshawn Pierre	8	5	0
C	45	(United States) Jack Cooley	16	11	0
Reserves:					
PG	0	(Italy) Marco Spissu	2	2	0
SG	3	(United States) Tyrus McGee	14	3	1
SF	8	(Italy) Giacomo Devecchi	DNP		
C	15	(Italy) Daniele Magro	2	2	0
SG	22	(Italy) Stefano Gentile	4	4	1
PF	33	(Italy) Achille Polonara	4	8	2
C	35	(Senegal) Ousmane Diop	DNP		
Head coach:
(Italian Basketball Federation) Gianmarco Pozzecco

=== Game 3 ===
14 June 2019	Banco di Sardegna Sassari	73–76 (Series: 1–2)	Umana Reyer Venezia	Sassari
20:45	Scoring by quarter: 16–19, 16–20, 14–20, 27–17
Eurosport, Rai Sport	Pts: Thomas 17; Rebs: Cooley, Pierre 8 Asts: three players 3 PIR: Thomas 20	Boxscore	Pts: Daye 22; Rebs: Daye, Watt 7 Asts: three players 3 PIR: Daye 24	Arena: PalaSerradimigni; Referees: Carmelo Paternico', Manuel Mazzoni, Alessandro Martolini

Starters:			Pts	Reb	Ast
PG	2	(United States) Jaime Smith	7	1	1
PF	25	(United States) Rashawn Thomas	17	6	3
SF	21	(United States) Justin Carter	0	0	0
SG	6	(Canada) Dyshawn Pierre	15	8	0
C	45	(United States) Jack Cooley	6	8	1
Reserves:					
PG	0	(Italy) Marco Spissu	5	2	3
SG	3	(United States) Tyrus McGee	3	2	3
SF	8	(Italy) Giacomo Devecchi	DNP		
C	15	(Italy) Daniele Magro	DNP		
SG	22	(Italy) Stefano Gentile	10	4	1
PF	33	(Italy) Achille Polonara	10	5	1
C	35	(Senegal) Ousmane Diop	DNP		
Head coach:
(Italian Basketball Federation) Gianmarco Pozzecco

Banco di Sardegna Sassari	Umana Reyer Venezia

Starters:			Pts	Reb	Ast
PG	0	(Georgia (country)) MarQuez Haynes	9	1	1
PF	22	(Italy) Valerio Mazzola	0	2	0
SF	6	(Greece) Michael Bramos	8	5	1
SG	5	(United States) Julyan Stone	9	6	1
C	50	(United States) Mitchell Watt	9	7	1
Reserves:					
SG	7	(Italy) Stefano Tonut	10	1	0
PF	9	(United States) Austin Daye	22	7	3
PG	10	(Italy) Andrea De Nicolao	6	2	3
C	14	(Slovenia) Gašper Vidmar	0	3	3
C	19	(Italy) Paul Biligha	DNP		
PG	21	(Italy) Marco Giuri	3	3	0
SF	30	(Italy) Bruno Cerella	0	1	0
Head coach:
(Italian Basketball Federation) Walter De Raffaele

=== Game 4 ===
16 June 2019	Banco di Sardegna Sassari	95–88 (Series: 2–2)	Umana Reyer Venezia	Sassari
20:45	Scoring by quarter: 23–16, 28–25, 30–24, 14–23
Eurosport, Rai Sport	Pts: Thomas 19; Rebs: Cooley 9 Asts: Smith 4 PIR: Cooley 29	Boxscore	Pts: Haynes 22; Rebs: three players 5 Asts: Stone 6 PIR: Stone 13	Arena: PalaSerradimigni; Referees: Roberto Begnis, Michele Rossi, Maurizio Biggi

Starters:			Pts	Reb	Ast
PG	2	(United States) Jaime Smith	10	0	4
PF	25	(United States) Rashawn Thomas	19	8	1
SF	6	(Canada) Dyshawn Pierre	12	2	2
SG	3	(United States) Tyrus McGee	11	4	1
C	45	(United States) Jack Cooley	18	9	3
Reserves:					
PG	0	(Italy) Marco Spissu	9	3	3
SF	8	(Italy) Giacomo Devecchi	DNP		
C	15	(Italy) Daniele Magro	2	0	1
SF	21	(United States) Justin Carter	12	3	0
SG	22	(Italy) Stefano Gentile	0	1	1
PF	33	(Italy) Achille Polonara	2	4	0
C	35	(Senegal) Ousmane Diop	DNP		
Head coach:
(Italian Basketball Federation) Gianmarco Pozzecco

Banco di Sardegna Sassari	Umana Reyer Venezia

Starters:			Pts	Reb	Ast
PG	0	(Georgia (country)) MarQuez Haynes	22	0	1
PF	22	(Italy) Valerio Mazzola	0	0	0
SF	6	(Greece) Michael Bramos	9	5	1
SG	5	(United States) Julyan Stone	7	4	6
C	50	(United States) Mitchell Watt	10	5	1
Reserves:					
SG	7	(Italy) Stefano Tonut	7	2	1
PF	9	(United States) Austin Daye	16	2	3
PG	10	(Italy) Andrea De Nicolao	6	5	2
C	14	(Slovenia) Gašper Vidmar	6	3	1
C	19	(Italy) Paul Biligha	DNP		
PG	21	(Italy) Marco Giuri	2	1	0
SF	30	(Italy) Bruno Cerella	3	1	2
Head coach:
(Italian Basketball Federation) Walter De Raffaele

=== Game 5 ===
18 June 2019	Umana Reyer Venezia	78–65 (Series: 3–2)	Banco di Sardegna Sassari	Mestre, Venice
20:45	Scoring by quarter: 21–14, 17–20, 22–19, 18–12
Eurosport, Rai Sport	Pts: Daye 20; Rebs: Daye 7 Asts: Haynes, Stone 4 PIR: Daye 22	Boxscore	Pts: Thomas 20; Rebs: Pierre 11; Asts: Spissu 3 PIR: Thomas 19	Arena: Palasport Taliercio; Referees: Carmelo Paternico', Massimiliano Filippini, Denis Quarta

Starters:			Pts	Reb	Ast
PG	0	(Georgia (country)) MarQuez Haynes	10	3	4
PF	19	(Italy) Paul Biligha	0	0	0
SF	6	(Greece) Michael Bramos	11	4	1
SG	5	(United States) Julyan Stone	2	5	4
C	14	(Slovenia) Gašper Vidmar	5	3	1
Reserves:					
SG	7	(Italy) Stefano Tonut	15	3	2
PF	9	(United States) Austin Daye	20	7	1
PG	10	(Italy) Andrea De Nicolao	8	0	1
PG	21	(Italy) Marco Giuri	0	0	0
PF	22	(Italy) Valerio Mazzola	0	2	1
SF	30	(Italy) Bruno Cerella	5	2	0
C	50	(United States) Mitchell Watt	2	3	1
Head coach:
(Italian Basketball Federation) Walter De Raffaele

Umana Reyer Venezia	Banco di Sardegna Sassari

Starters:			Pts	Reb	Ast
PG	2	(United States) Jaime Smith	6	0	1
PF	25	(United States) Rashawn Thomas	20	10	2
SF	6	(Canada) Dyshawn Pierre	4	11	2
SG	3	(United States) Tyrus McGee	6	5	2
C	45	(United States) Jack Cooley	4	2	0
Reserves:					
PG	0	(Italy) Marco Spissu	17	4	3
SF	8	(Italy) Giacomo Devecchi	DNP		
C	15	(Italy) Daniele Magro	2	0	0
SF	21	(United States) Justin Carter	1	1	0
SG	22	(Italy) Stefano Gentile	0	0	0
PF	33	(Italy) Achille Polonara	5	5	2
C	35	(Senegal) Ousmane Diop	DNP		
Head coach:
(Italian Basketball Federation) Gianmarco Pozzecco

=== Game 6 ===
20 June 2019	Banco di Sardegna Sassari	87–77 (Series: 3–3)	Umana Reyer Venezia	Sassari
20:45	Scoring by quarter: 19–25, 15–15, 29–17, 24–20
Eurosport, Rai Sport	Pts: Cooley 26; Rebs: Cooley 11; Asts: three players 4 PIR: Cooley 29	Boxscore	Pts: Watt 17; Rebs: De Nicolao 6 Asts: Daye 7 PIR: Watt 21	Arena: PalaSerradimigni; Referees: Saverio Lanzarini, Manuel Mazzoni, Luca Weidmann

Starters:			Pts	Reb	Ast
PG	2	(United States) Jaime Smith	6	1	3
PF	25	(United States) Rashawn Thomas	18	8	4
SF	6	(Canada) Dyshawn Pierre	4	2	4
SG	3	(United States) Tyrus McGee	10	4	3
C	45	(United States) Jack Cooley	26	11	0
Reserves:					
PG	0	(Italy) Marco Spissu	11	3	4
SF	8	(Italy) Giacomo Devecchi	DNP		
C	15	(Italy) Daniele Magro	DNP		
SF	21	(United States) Justin Carter	5	4	1
SG	22	(Italy) Stefano Gentile	0	0	1
PF	33	(Italy) Achille Polonara	7	4	1
C	35	(Senegal) Ousmane Diop	DNP		
Head coach:
(Italian Basketball Federation) Gianmarco Pozzecco

Banco di Sardegna Sassari	Umana Reyer Venezia

Starters:			Pts	Reb	Ast
PG	0	(Georgia (country)) MarQuez Haynes	10	0	1
PF	22	(Italy) Valerio Mazzola	3	3	0
SF	6	(Greece) Michael Bramos	15	6	0
SG	5	(United States) Julyan Stone	0	2	3
C	14	(Slovenia) Gašper Vidmar	0	2	0
Reserves:					
SG	7	(Italy) Stefano Tonut	0	2	2
PF	9	(United States) Austin Daye	10	7	2
PG	10	(Italy) Andrea De Nicolao	11	2	6
C	19	(Italy) Paul Biligha	DNP		
PG	21	(Italy) Marco Giuri	3	1	1
SF	30	(Italy) Bruno Cerella	8	0	0
C	50	(United States) Mitchell Watt	17	6	0
Head coach:
(Italian Basketball Federation) Walter De Raffaele

=== Game 7 ===
22 June 2019	Umana Reyer Venezia	87–61 (Series: 4–3)	Banco di Sardegna Sassari	Mestre, Venice
20:45	Scoring by quarter: 16–12, 23–18, 30–17, 18–14
Eurosport, Rai Sport	Pts: Bramos 22; Rebs: Mazzola 7 Asts: Stone 4 PIR: Bramos 24	Boxscore	Pts: Thomas 16; Rebs: Cooley 11; Asts: McGee 3 PIR: Cooley 18	Arena: Palasport Taliercio; Referees: Carmelo Paternico', Roberto Begnis, Michele Rossi

Starters:			Pts	Reb	Ast
PG	0	(Georgia (country)) MarQuez Haynes	21	3	1
PF	22	(Italy) Valerio Mazzola	0	7	1
SF	6	(Greece) Michael Bramos	22	6	0
SG	5	(United States) Julyan Stone	3	4	4
C	14	(Slovenia) Gašper Vidmar	6	3	1
Reserves:					
SG	7	(Italy) Stefano Tonut	0	0	2
PF	9	(United States) Austin Daye	13	6	2
PG	10	(Italy) Andrea De Nicolao	10	2	3
C	19	(Italy) Paul Biligha	0	0	0
PG	21	(Italy) Marco Giuri	0	0	0
SF	30	(Italy) Bruno Cerella	2	3	0
C	50	(United States) Mitchell Watt	10	6	0
Head coach:
(Italian Basketball Federation) Walter De Raffaele

Umana Reyer Venezia	Banco di Sardegna Sassari

LBA Finals MVP
(United States) Austin Daye
Game rules
Game played under FIBA rules.

2018–19 LBA Winners

Umana Reyer Venezia
4th title

Starters:			Pts	Reb	Ast
PG	2	(United States) Jaime Smith	9	2	2
PF	25	(United States) Rashawn Thomas	16	7	1
SF	6	(Canada) Dyshawn Pierre	3	3	0
SG	3	(United States) Tyrus McGee	9	5	3
C	45	(United States) Jack Cooley	9	11	2
Reserves:					
PG	0	(Italy) Marco Spissu	8	2	0
SF	8	(Italy) Giacomo Devecchi	0	0	0
C	15	(Italy) Daniele Magro	0	0	0
SF	21	(United States) Justin Carter	4	3	0
SG	22	(Italy) Stefano Gentile	0	1	0
PF	33	(Italy) Achille Polonara	3	4	2
C	35	(Senegal) Ousmane Diop	0	0	0
Head coach:
(Italian Basketball Federation) Gianmarco Pozzecco

== Rosters ==
=== Umana Reyer Venezia ===
Umana Reyer Venezia roster
Players
Coaches

Pos.	No.	Nat.	Name	Ht.	Wt.	Age
PG	0	(Georgia (country))	Haynes, MarQuez (C)	1.91 m (6 ft 3 in)	84 kg (185 lb)	39 – 19 December 1986
G/F	1	(United States)	Kennedy, D. J.	1.98 m (6 ft 6 in)	98 kg (216 lb)	36 – 5 November 1989
SG	5	(United States)	Stone, Julyan	1.98 m (6 ft 6 in)	91 kg (201 lb)	37 – 7 December 1988
G/F	6	(Greece)	Bramos, Michael	1.98 m (6 ft 6 in)	102 kg (225 lb)	39 – 27 May 1987
SG	7	(Italy)	Tonut, Stefano	1.94 m (6 ft 4 in)	90 kg (198 lb)	32 – 7 November 1993
PF	9	(United States)	Daye, Austin	2.11 m (6 ft 11 in)	100 kg (220 lb)	38 – 5 June 1988
PG	10	(Italy)	De Nicolao, Andrea	1.85 m (6 ft 1 in)	75 kg (165 lb)	35 – 21 August 1991
C	14	(Slovenia)	Vidmar, Gašper	2.11 m (6 ft 11 in)	118 kg (260 lb)	39 – 14 September 1987
PF	15	(Serbia)	Jerkovic, Mihajlo	2.00 m (6 ft 7 in)	95 kg (209 lb)	27 – 21 June 1999
SF	17	(United States)	Washington, Deron	2.03 m (6 ft 8 in)	95 kg (209 lb)	40 – 12 December 1985
C	19	(Italy)	Biligha, Paul	2.00 m (6 ft 7 in)	106 kg (234 lb)	36 – 31 May 1990
G	21	(Italy)	Giuri, Marco	1.93 m (6 ft 4 in)	90 kg (198 lb)	38 – 8 July 1988
F/C	22	(Italy)	Mazzola, Valerio	2.05 m (6 ft 9 in)	111 kg (245 lb)	38 – 7 March 1988
G/F	30	(Italy)	Cerella, Bruno	1.94 m (6 ft 4 in)	93 kg (205 lb)	40 – 30 July 1986
C	50	(United States)	Watt, Mitchell	2.08 m (6 ft 10 in)	102 kg (225 lb)	36 – 14 December 1989
SG	77	(Czech Republic)	Kyzlink, Tomáš	1.96 m (6 ft 5 in)	80 kg (176 lb)	33 – 18 June 1993

Head coach

- (Italy) Walter De Raffaele

Assistant coach(es)

- (Italy) Alberto Billio
- (Italy) Giacomo Baioni
- (Italy) Gianluca Tucci

Athletic trainer(s)

- (Italy) Renzo Colombini

Physiotherapist(s)

- (Italy) Alberto De Bei
- (Italy) Leopoldo Buttinoni

Team manager

- (Italy) Mauro Sartori

Legend

- (C) Team captain
- Injured

- Roster
Updated: April 11, 2019

=== Banco di Sardegna Sassari ===
Dinamo Sassari roster
Players
Coaches

Pos.	No.	Nat.	Name	Ht.	Wt.	Age
PG	0	(Italy)	Spissu, Marco	1.84 m (6 ft 0 in)	79 kg (174 lb)	31 – 5 February 1995
PG	2	(United States)	Smith, Jaime	1.90 m (6 ft 3 in)	83 kg (183 lb)	37 – 11 July 1989
SG	3	(United States)	McGee, Tyrus	1.88 m (6 ft 2 in)	90 kg (198 lb)	35 – 14 April 1991
SG	4	(Kosovo)	Bamforth, Scott	1.88 m (6 ft 2 in)	85 kg (187 lb)	37 – 12 August 1989
G/F	6	(United States)	Carter, Justin	1.93 m (6 ft 4 in)	91 kg (201 lb)	39 – 21 April 1987
G/F	8	(Italy)	Devecchi, Giacomo (C)	1.96 m (6 ft 5 in)	88 kg (194 lb)	41 – 2 April 1985
C	15	(Italy)	Magro, Daniele	2.08 m (6 ft 10 in)	105 kg (231 lb)	39 – 14 April 1987
F	21	(Canada)	Pierre, Dyshawn	1.98 m (6 ft 6 in)	104 kg (229 lb)	32 – 17 November 1993
G	22	(Italy)	Gentile, Stefano	1.91 m (6 ft 3 in)	90 kg (198 lb)	36 – 20 September 1989
F/C	25	(United States)	Thomas, Rashawn	2.03 m (6 ft 8 in)	104 kg (229 lb)	32 – 15 August 1994
PF	33	(Italy)	Polonara, Achille	2.05 m (6 ft 9 in)	102 kg (225 lb)	34 – 23 November 1991
F/C	35	(Senegal)	Diop, Ousmane	2.04 m (6 ft 8 in)	100 kg (220 lb)	26 – 19 February 2000
C	45	(United States)	Cooley, Jack	2.08 m (6 ft 10 in)	124 kg (273 lb)	35 – 12 April 1991

Head coach

- (Italy) Gianmarco Pozzecco

Assistant coach(es)

- (Italy) Edoardo Casalone
- (Italy) Giorgio Gerosa

Athletic trainer(s)

- (Italy) Matteo Boccolini

Team manager

- (Italy) Luca Rossini

Legend

- (C) Team captain
- Injured

- Roster
Updated: February 16, 2019
