= 2019–20 Dinamo Sassari season =

Dinamo Sassari
2019-20 season
- President: Stefano Sardara
- Head coach: Gianmarco Pozzecco
- Arena: Palasport Roberta Serradimigni
- LBA: season cancelled (2nd)
- BCL: Round of 16
- Coppa Italia: Quarter finals
- Supercoppa: Winners
Serie A	Champions League

The 2019–20 season is Dinamo Sassari's 60th in existence and the club's 10th consecutive season in the top flight of Italian basketball.

== Overview ==
During the 2018–19 season, Sassari competed in the Italian league and the FIBA Europe Cup. The club won the FIBA Europe Cup, its first European trophy.

In Italy, Sassari reached the finals and lost the series at the last best of 4 match, interrupting an incredible series of 15 consecutive wins in the Italian league.

Coach Gianmarco Pozzecco was hired during the 2018-19 season and, since his establishment, he lost only four games in the finals against Reyer Venezia after winning 23 consecutive games amongst Europe Cup and Serie A.

He got his contract extended for the next three years and immediately won the 2019 Italian Basketball Supercup in the new season.

The 2019-20 season was hit by the coronavirus pandemic that compelled the federation to suspend and later cancel the competition without assigning the title to anyone. Sassari ended the championship in 2nd position.

== Kit ==
Supplier: EYE Sport Wear / Sponsor: Banco di Sardegna

=== Lega Basket Serie A ===
Serie A Home	Serie A Away

=== FIBA Basketball Champions League ===
Champions League	Champions League

== Players ==
Before the early end of the season Sassari hired Jaime Smith who played for the team the previous year. During his presentation conference, on 3 March, coach Pozzecco declared that Curtis Jerrells wouldn't play anymore for the team but he was never officially released.

=== Current roster ===
Banco di Sardegna Sassari roster
Players
Coaches

Pos.	No.	Nat.	Name	Ht.	Wt.	Age
PG	0	(Italy)	Spissu, Marco	1.84 m (6 ft 0 in)	80 kg (176 lb)	31 – 5 February 1995
C	2	(Croatia)	Bilan, Miro	2.13 m (7 ft 0 in)	121 kg (267 lb)	37 – 21 July 1989
PG	3	(United States)	Smith, Jaime	1.90 m (6 ft 3 in)	83 kg (183 lb)	37 – 11 July 1989
G/F	7	(Italy)	Bucarelli, Lorenzo	1.98 m (6 ft 6 in)	93 kg (205 lb)	28 – 6 March 1998
G/F	8	(Italy)	Devecchi, Giacomo (C)	1.96 m (6 ft 5 in)	88 kg (194 lb)	41 – 2 April 1985
PF	9	(Lithuania)	Sorokas, Paulius	2.02 m (6 ft 8 in)	100 kg (220 lb)	34 – 25 April 1992
F	11	(United States)	Evans, Dwayne	2.01 m (6 ft 7 in)	104 kg (229 lb)	34 – 25 January 1992
C	15	(Italy)	Magro, Daniele	2.08 m (6 ft 10 in)	112 kg (247 lb)	39 – 14 April 1987
SF	21	(Canada)	Pierre, Dyshawn	1.98 m (6 ft 6 in)	104 kg (229 lb)	32 – 17 November 1993
G	22	(Italy)	Gentile, Stefano	1.91 m (6 ft 3 in)	94 kg (207 lb)	36 – 20 September 1989
C	23	(The Bahamas)	Coleby, Dwight	2.06 m (6 ft 9 in)	110 kg (243 lb)	32 – 16 January 1994
SG	31	(Italy)	Vitali, Michele	1.96 m (6 ft 5 in)	86 kg (190 lb)	34 – 31 October 1991
PG	55	(United States)	Jerrells, Curtis	1.85 m (6 ft 1 in)	88 kg (194 lb)	39 – 5 February 1987

Head coach

- (Italy) Gianmarco Pozzecco

Assistant coach(es)

- (Italy) Edoardo Casalone
- (Italy) Giorgio Gerosa

Legend

- (C) Team captain
- Injured

- Roster
Updated: April 16, 2020

Note: Flags indicate national team eligibility at FIBA-sanctioned events. Players may hold other non-FIBA nationalities not displayed.

=== Depth chart ===
Pos.	Starting 5	Bench 1	Bench 2
C	Miro Bilan	Dwight Coleby	Daniele Magro
PF	Dwayne Evans	Paulius Sorokas
SF	Dyshawn Pierre	Lorenzo Bucarelli	Giacomo Devecchi
SG	Michele Vitali	Stefano Gentile
PG	Marco Spissu	Jaime Smith	Curtis Jerrells

5+5 format (colours: Italian or homegrown players; foreign players; young players)

=== Squad changes ===
==== In ====
No.	Pos.	Nat.	Name	Age	Moving from		Type	Ends	Transfer fee	Date	Source
2	C	(Croatia)	Miro Bilan	29	ASVEL	(France)	1 year	June 2020	Free	13 July 2019	
11	F	(United States)	Dwayne Evans	27	ratiopharm Ulm	(Germany)	1 year	June 2020	Free	23 July 2019	
31	SG	(Italy)	Michele Vitali	27	Andorra	(Spain)	3 years	June 2022	Free	24 July 2019	
55	PG	(United States)	Curtis Jerrells	32	Olimpia Milano	(Italy)	1 year	June 2020	Free	1 August 2019	
1	F/C	(United States)	Jamel McLean	31	Lokomotiv Kuban	(Russia)	1 year	June 2020	Free	28 August 2019	
7	SF	(Italy)	Lorenzo Bucarelli	21	Dinamo Cagliari	(Italy)	return from loan	June 2020	Free	28 August 2019	
9	PF	(Lithuania)	Paulius Sorokas	27	Spirou Charleroi	(Belgium)	1 year	June 2020	Free	18 September 2019	
23	C	(The Bahamas)	Dwight Coleby	26	İTÜ Basket	(Turkey)	end of season	June 2020	Free	20 January 2020	
3	PG	(United States)	Jaime Smith	30	Teksüt Bandırma	(Turkey)	end of season	June 2020	Free	2 March 2020	

==== Out ====
No.	Pos.	Nat.	Name	Age	Moving to		Type	Transfer fee	Date	Source
2	PG	(United States)	Jaime Smith	29	Bandirma Banvit	(Turkey)	end of contract	Free	1 July 2019	
3	SG	(United States)	Tyrus McGee	28	Élan Béarnais	(France)	end of contract	Free	1 July 2019	
4	SG	(Kosovo)	Scott Bamforth	29	Budućnost	(Montenegro)	end of contract	Free	1 July 2019	
5	G/F	(United States)	Terran Petteway	26	Pistoia	(Italy)	end of contract	Free	1 July 2019	
6	G/F	(United States)	Justin Carter	32	Chorale Roanne	(France)	end of contract	Free	1 July 2019	
25	PG	(United States)	Rashawn Thomas	24	Partizan Belgrade	(Serbia)	end of contract	Free	1 July 2019	
35	PF	(Italy)	Ousmane Diop	19	Torino	(Italy)	end of contract	Free	1 July 2019	
45	C	(United States)	Jack Cooley	28	Ryukyu Golden Kings	(Japan)	end of contract	Free	1 July 2019	
33	PF	(Italy)	Achille Polonara	27	Saski Baskonia	(Spain)	transfer	100.000 €	28 August 2019	
1	F/C	(United States)	Jamel McLean	31	Nagoya Diamond Dolphins	(Japan)	mutual consent	Undisclosed	13 January 2020	

==== Confirmed ====
No.	Pos.	Nat.	Name	Age	Moving from		Type	Ends	Transfer fee	Date	Source
8	G/F	(Italy)	Giacomo Devecchi	34	Sutor Montegranaro	(Italy)	4 years	June 2023	Free	27 July 2006	
21	SG	(United States)	Dyshawn Pierre	25	Basketball Löwen Braunschweig	(Germany)	1 + 1 + 1 year	June 2020	Free	28 June 2017	
0	PG	(Italy)	Marco Spissu	24	Virtus Bologna	(Italy)	3 year	June 2022	return from loan	15 July 2017	
22	SG	(Italy)	Stefano Gentile	30	Virtus Bologna	(Italy)	2 + 2 year	June 2021	Free	25 June 2018	
15	C	(Italy)	Daniele Magro	32	Pistoia	(Italy)	1 + 1 year	June 2020	Free	1 July 2018	

==== Coach ====
Nat.	Name	Age.	Previous team		Type	Ends	Date	Source
(Italy)	Gianmarco Pozzecco	54	Fortitudo Bologna	(Italy)	3	2022	11 February 2019	

== Competitions ==
=== SuperCup ===
Sassari took part in the 25th edition of the Italian Basketball Supercup as the 2019 LBA Finals runner-up and won the competition against Reyer Venezia.

21 September 2019 Semifinals	Vanoli Cremona	94–101(OT)	Banco di Sardegna Sassari	Bari
18:00 (CEST)	Scoring by quarter: 21–16, 28–30, 20–20, 18–21, Overtime: 7–14
Eurosport	Pts: Matthew Tiby 25; Rebs: Saunders 6 Asts: Diener 5 PIR: Matthew Tiby, Diener 20	Boxscore	Pts: Evans 18; Rebs: McLean, Evans 9 Asts: Spissu 7 PIR: Evans, Spissu 25	Arena: PalaFlorio

22 September 2019 Finals	Banco di Sardegna Sassari	83–80(OT)	Umana Reyer Venezia	Bari
20:30	Scoring by quarter: 22–11, 19–13, 17–24, 11–21, Overtime: 14–11
Eurosport	Pts: Jerrells 19; Rebs: Evans 8 Asts: three players 3 PIR: McLean 21	Boxscore	Pts: Chappell 19; Rebs: Bramos, Watt 7 Asts: Chappell, Stone 3 PIR: Chappell 21	Arena: PalaFlorio

=== Serie A ===
Pos	Team	Pld	W	L	PF	PA	PD	Qualification or relegation
1	Segafredo Virtus Bologna	20	18	2	1719	1500	+219	Qualification for EuroCup
2	Banco di Sardegna Sassari	20	15	5	1703	1506	+197	Qualification for Champions League
3	Germani Basket Brescia	21	14	7	1707	1554	+153	Qualification for EuroCup
4	AX Armani Exchange Milano	21	14	7	1687	1555	+132	Already qualified for EuroLeague
5	Happy Casa Brindisi	21	13	8	1776	1696	+80	Qualification for Champions League

Updated to match(es) played on 9 February 2020. Source: LBA

=== Basketball Champions League ===
After the successes of the previous year, Dinamo Sassari was promoted to the 2019–20 Basketball Champions League as winner of the FIBA Europe Cup.

==== Regular season ====
Pos	Team	Pld	W	L	PF	PA	PD	Pts	Qualification
1	(Turkey) Türk Telekom	14	11	3	1173	1075	+98	25	Advance to round of 16
2	(Italy) Dinamo Sassari	14	11	3	1181	1088	+93	25	Advance to round of 16
3	(Belgium) Filou Oostende	14	8	6	1059	1085	−26	22	Advance to round of 16
4	(Lithuania) Lietkabelis	14	7	7	1079	1077	+2	21	Advance to round of 16
5	(Spain) Baxi Manresa	14	7	7	1095	1069	+26	21	
6	(Israel) Hapoel Holon	14	6	8	1164	1170	−6	20	
7	(France) SIG Strasbourg	14	4	10	1082	1155	−73	18	
8	(Poland) Polski Cukier Toruń	14	2	12	1231	1345	−114	16	

Source: Basketball Champions League

==== Playoffs ====
The 2019–20 Basketball Champions League playoffs start from the round of 16 and is structured on a best-of-three basis until the final four.

===== Round of 16 =====
4 March 2019

Boxscore

Dinamo Sassari (Italy)	81–84	(Spain) San Pablo Burgos

Sassari, Italy

The second match was played behind closed doors due to the coronavirus pandemic, where Sassari was coming after two days without training.

10 March 2019

Boxscore

San Pablo Burgos (Spain)	95–80	(Italy) Dinamo Sassari

Burgos, Spain

=== Italian Cup ===
Sassari qualified to the 2020 Italian Basketball Cup having ended the first half of the season in 2nd place. They lost the first match in the quarter finals against Happy Casa Brindisi.

14 February 2020 Quarter finals	Banco di Sardegna Sassari	86–91	Happy Casa Brindisi	Pesaro
18:00	Scoring by quarter: 22–26, 16–13, 23–25, 25–27
Eurosport, Rai Sport	Pts: Pierre 21; Rebs: Pierre 9 Asts: Evans 5 PIR: Pierre 31	Boxscore	Pts: Banks 37; Rebs: Banks 8 Asts: John Brown 4 PIR: Banks 41	Arena: Adriatic Arena; Referees: Saverio Lanzarini, Alessandro Vicino, Mark Bartoli
