= 2020–21 Reyer Venezia season =

Italian basketball season

Reyer Venezia
2020-21 season
- Owner: Luigi Brugnaro
- President: Federico Casarin
- Head coach: Walter De Raffaele
- Arena: Palasport Giuseppe Taliercio
- LBA: 4th of 15
- Playoffs: Semifinals
- EuroCup: Regular season (6th of 6)
- Italian Cup: Semifinal
- Supercup: Semifinals

The 2020–21 season is Reyer Venezia's 149th in existence and the club's 11th consecutive season in the top tier Italian basketball.

== Overview ==
Venezia starts the season with the confirmation of all the technical staff as it was the most successful Italian team of the 2019-20 season. As a matter of fact they were the only Italian team at winning something as they won the Italian Cup while the Italian championship along with all the European competition were cancelled due to the coronavirus pandemic.

== Kit ==
Supplier: Erreà / Sponsor: Umana

Home	Away

== Players ==
=== Current roster ===
Umana Reyer Venezia roster
Players
Coaches

Pos.	No.	Nat.	Name	Ht.	Wt.	Age
PG	3	(Italy)	Casarin, Davide	1.96 m (6 ft 5 in)	86 kg (190 lb)	23 – 22 May 2003
G	5	(United States)	Stone, Julyan	1.98 m (6 ft 6 in)	95 kg (209 lb)	37 – 7 December 1988
G/F	6	(Greece)	Bramos, Michael (C)	1.98 m (6 ft 6 in)	102 kg (225 lb)	39 – 27 May 1987
SG	7	(Italy)	Tonut, Stefano	1.94 m (6 ft 4 in)	100 kg (220 lb)	32 – 7 November 1993
PF	9	(United States)	Daye, Austin	2.07 m (6 ft 9 in)	91 kg (201 lb)	38 – 5 June 1988
PG	10	(Italy)	De Nicolao, Andrea	1.85 m (6 ft 1 in)	75 kg (165 lb)	35 – 21 August 1991
G	12	(Italy)	Campogrande, Luca	1.98 m (6 ft 6 in)	90 kg (198 lb)	30 – 30 April 1996
C	14	(Slovenia)	Vidmar, Gašper	2.10 m (6 ft 11 in)	120 kg (265 lb)	39 – 14 September 1987
G	15	(United States)	Clark, Wes	1.84 m (6 ft 0 in)	83 kg (183 lb)	31 – 12 December 1994
SG	21	(United States)	Chappell, Jeremy	1.91 m (6 ft 3 in)	91 kg (201 lb)	39 – 10 June 1987
PF	22	(Italy)	Mazzola, Valerio	2.05 m (6 ft 9 in)	107 kg (236 lb)	38 – 7 March 1988
G/F	30	(Argentina)	Cerella, Bruno	1.94 m (6 ft 4 in)	93 kg (205 lb)	40 – 30 July 1986
C	33	(Italy)	Possamai, Luca	2.11 m (6 ft 11 in)	110 kg (243 lb)	25 – 10 May 2001
PF	42	(New Zealand)	Fotu, Isaac	2.03 m (6 ft 8 in)	104 kg (229 lb)	32 – 18 December 1993
C	50	(United States)	Watt, Mitchell	2.08 m (6 ft 10 in)	106 kg (234 lb)	36 – 14 December 1989
PG	55	(United States)	Jerrells, Curtis	1.85 m (6 ft 1 in)	88 kg (194 lb)	39 – 5 February 1987

Head coach

- (Italy) Walter De Raffaele

Assistant coach(es)

- (Italy) Gianluca Tucci
- (Italy) Alberto Billio
- (Italy) Massimo Galli

Legend

- (C) Team captain
- Injured

- Roster
Updated: 2 June 2021

Note: Flags indicate national team eligibility at FIBA-sanctioned events. Players may hold other non-FIBA nationalities not displayed.

=== Depth chart ===
Pos.	Starting 5	Bench 1	Bench 2	Bench 3
C	Mitchell Watt	Gašper Vidmar	Luca Possamai
PF	Austin Daye	Isaac Fotu	Valerio Mazzola
SF	Michael Bramos	Jeremy Chappell	Bruno Cerella
SG	Stefano Tonut	Davide Casarin	Luca Campogrande
PG	Julyan Stone	Andrea De Nicolao	Curtis Jerrells	Wes Clark

6+6 format (colours: Italian or homegrown players; foreign players; young players)

=== Squad changes ===
==== In ====
No.	Pos.	Nat.	Name	Age	Moving from		Type	Ends	Transfer fee	Date	Source
25	PG	(Italy)	Lorenzo D'Ercole	32	Pistoia	(Italy)	1 year	June 2021	Free	1 July 2020	
42	PF	(New Zealand)	Isaac Fotu	32	Universo Treviso Basket	(Italy)	1 year	June 2021	Free	6 July 2020	
12	SG	(Italy)	Luca Campogrande	24	Virtus Roma	(Italy)	1 year	June 2021	Free	18 December 2020	
15	G	(United States)	Wes Clark	26	Niners Chemnitz	(Germany)	End of the year	June 2021	Undisclosed	11 January 2021	
55	PG	(United States)	Curtis Jerrells	34	Anwil Włocławek	(Poland)	End of the year	June 2021	Undisclosed	7 May 2021	

1. In players: Players who signed after the beginning of the season

==== Out ====
No.	Pos.	Nat.	Name	Age	Moving to		Type	Transfer fee	Date	Source
0	PF	(United States) (Nigeria)	Ike Udanoh	30	Pallacanestro Trieste	(Italy)	End of contract	Free	16 June 2020	
12	PG	(Italy) (Argentina)	Ariel Filloy	33	V.L. Pesaro	(Italy)	End of contract	Free	16 June 2020	
15	SG	(United States)	Andrew Goudelock	31	Rytas Vilnius	(Lithuania)	End of contract	Free	16 June 2020	
29	C	(Italy)	Francesco Pellegrino	28	Pallalcesto Amatori Udine	(Italy)	End of contract	Free	16 June 2020	
25	PG	(Italy)	Lorenzo D'Ercole	33	Derthona Basket	(Italy)	Transfer	Undisclosed	17 February 2021	

1. Out players: Players who left before the end of the season

==== Confirmed ====
No.	Pos.	Nat.	Name	Age	Moving from		Type	Ends	Transfer fee	Date	Source
7	SG	(Italy)	Stefano Tonut	26	Pallacanestro Trieste	(Italy)	2 + 5 years	June 2023	Free	1 July 2015	
6	SF	(Greece) (United States)	Michael Bramos	33	Panathinaikos	(Greece)	6 years	June 2021	Free	28 August 2015	
10	PG	(Italy)	Andrea De Nicolao	28	Reggio Emilia	(Italy)	3 + 2+1 years	June 2022 + 2023	Free	13 July 2017	
50	C	(United States)	Mitchell Watt	30	Shabab Al Ahli Dubai	(United Arab Emirates)	3 + 3 years	June 2023	Free	18 July 2017	
30	G/F	(Argentina) (Italy)	Bruno Cerella	33	Olimpia Milano	(Italy)	3 + 1years	June 2021	Free	22 August 2017	
9	PF	(United States)	Austin Daye	32	Hapoel Jerusalem	(Israel)	3 + 2+1 years	June 2022 + 2023	Free	29 January 2018	
5	PG	(United States)	Julyan Stone	31	Charlotte Hornets	(United States)	3 years	June 2021	Free	15 July 2018	
22	PF	(Italy)	Valerio Mazzola	32	Auxilium Torino	(Italy)	2 + 2 years	June 2022	Free	18 July 2018	
14	C	(Slovenia)	Gašper Vidmar	32	Banvit	(Turkey)	2 + 1 years	June 2021	Free	3 October 2018	
3	SG	(Italy)	Davide Casarin	17	youth team	(Italy)	1 year	June 2021	Youth system	2019	
21	SG	(United States)	Jeremy Chappell	33	New Basket Brindisi	(Italy)	1 + 1 years	June 2021	Free	22 July 2019	

==== From youth team ====
No.	Pos.	Nat.	Name	Age	Transfer fee	Date	Source
33	C	(Italy)	Luca Possamai	19	Youth system	9 July 2020	

==== Coach ====
Nat.	Name	Age.	Last team		Type	Ends	Date	Source
(Italy)	Walter De Raffaele	51	Reyer Venezia (assistant)	(Italy)	2 + 3 years	June 2021	12 March 2016	

=== On loan ===
Pos.	Nat.	Name	Age	Moving from		Moving to		Date	Source
SG	(Italy)	Federico Miaschi	20	VL Pesaro	(Italy)	Pallacanestro Biella	(Italy)	23 July 2020	
PG	(Italy)	Nicola Berdini	16	youth team	(Italy)	Pallacanestro Biella	(Italy)	23 July 2020	

== Competitions ==
=== Supercup ===
Pos	Team	Pld	W	L	PF	PA	PD	Qualification
1	Umana Reyer Venezia	6	4	2	462	434	+28	Advance to Final Four
2	De' Longhi Treviso	6	3	3	475	459	+16	
3	Allianz Pallacanestro Trieste	6	3	3	428	467	−39	
4	Dolomiti Energia Trento	6	2	4	467	472	−5	

Source: LegaBasket Serie A
Rules for classification: All points scored in extra period(s) were not counted in the standings, nor for any tie-break situation.

==== Final Four ====
18 September 2019 Semifinal	AX Armani Exchange Olimpia Milano	76–67	Umana Reyer Venezia	Bologna
18:00 (CEST)	Scoring by quarter: 26-15, 17-8, 14-23, 19-21
Eurosport	Pts: Delaney 19; Rebs: Tarczewski 6 Asts: Delaney 6 PIR: Delaney 32	Boxscore	Pts: Watt 19; Rebs: Daye 7 Asts: De Nicolao 8 PIR: Watt 26	Arena: Segafredo Arena; Referees: Saverio Lanzarini, Mark Bartoli, Guido Federico Di Francesco

=== Italian Cup ===
Bologna qualified to the 2021 Italian Basketball Cup by ending the first half of the LBA season in the 5th position. They played the quarterfinal against the 4th ranking Segafredo Virtus Bologna.

11 February 2021 Quarterfinals	Segafredo Virtus Bologna	82–89	Umana Reyer Venezia	Assago (Milan)
20:45	Scoring by quarter: 16-23, 22-18, 23-24, 21-24
Rai Sport, Eurosport	Pts: Teodosić 15; Rebs: Hunter 7 Asts: Teodosić 6 PIR: Teodosić 19	Boxscore	Pts: Bramos 23; Rebs: Bramos 13; Asts: De Nicolao 5 PIR: Bramos 31	Arena: Mediolanum Forum; Referees: Tolga Sahin, Carmelo Lo Guzzo, Guido Giovannetti

13 February 2021 Semifinal	AX Armani Exchange Milano	96–65	Umana Reyer Venezia	Assago (Milan)
18:00 (CET)	Scoring by quarter: 20-25, 22-13, 30-11, 24-16
Rai Sport, Eurosport	Pts: Rodríguez 22; Rebs: Hines 10; Asts: Rodríguez 9 PIR: Rodríguez 30	Boxscore	Pts: Watt 18; Rebs: Watt 6 Asts: De Nicolao 5 PIR: Watt 20	Arena: Mediolanum Forum

=== Serie A ===
==== Regular season ====
Pos	Team	Pld	W	L	PF	PA	PD	Qualification
2	Happy Casa Brindisi	28	20	8	2395	2212	+183	Qualification to Playoffs
3	Virtus Segafredo Bologna	28	19	9	2397	2168	+229	Qualification to Playoffs
4	Umana Reyer Venezia	28	19	9	2257	2142	+115	Qualification to Playoffs
5	Banco di Sardegna Sassari	28	18	10	2527	2437	+90	Qualification to Playoffs
6	De' Longhi Treviso	28	14	14	2353	2468	−115	Qualification to Playoffs

Updated to match(es) played on 10 May 2021. Source: LBA

==== Playoffs ====
===== Quarterfinals =====
13 May 2021 Game 1	Umana Reyer Venezia	92–91(OT) (Series: 1-0)	Banco di Sardegna Sassari	Mestre (Venice)
18:00 (CET)	Scoring by quarter: 14-24, 21-19, 27-20, 19-18, Overtime: 11-10
Rai Sport, Eurosport Player	Pts: Chappell 19; Rebs: Stone 8 Asts: De Nicolao 6 PIR: Stone 23	Boxscore	Pts: Bilan 19; Rebs: Bilan 11; Asts: Spissu 4 PIR: Bilan 34	Arena: Taliercio; Referees: Saverio Lanzarini, Alessandro Vicino, Fabrizio Paglialunga

14 May 2021 Game 2	Umana Reyer Venezia	83–78 (Series: 2-0)	Banco di Sardegna Sassari	Mestre (Venice)
18:00 (CET)	Scoring by quarter: 21-24, 16-23, 20-7, 26-24
Rai Sport, Eurosport Player	Pts: Tonut 25; Rebs: Watt 7 Asts: Stone, Watt 4 PIR: Tonut 27	Boxscore	Pts: Happ 14; Rebs: Burnell, Bendžius, Gentile 9 Asts: Spissu 5 PIR: Happ 20	Arena: Taliercio; Referees: Carmelo Paternicò, Beniamino Manuel Attard, Denny Borgioni

16 May 2021 Game 3	Banco di Sardegna Sassari	75–60 (Series: 1-2)	Umana Reyer Venezia	Sassari
20:45 (CET)	Scoring by quarter: 22-12, 24-14, 15-16, 14-18
Rai Sport, Eurosport Player	Pts: Spissu, Bendžius 13; Rebs: Bilan 7 Asts: Spissu, Burnell 4 PIR: Spissu, Happ 15	Boxscore	Pts: Tonut 17; Rebs: Stone, Daye 7 Asts: Tonut, Daye 3 PIR: Daye 18	Arena: PalaSerradimigni; Referees: Tolga Sahin, Carmelo Lo Guzzo, Andrea Bongiorni

18 May 2021 Game 4	Banco di Sardegna Sassari	86–73 (Series: 2-2)	Umana Reyer Venezia	Sassari
20:45 (CET)	Scoring by quarter: 20-6, 11-29, 28-24, 27-14
Rai Sport, Eurosport 2	Pts: Bendžius 25; Rebs: Burnell 8 Asts: Spissu 5 PIR: Bendžius 27	Boxscore	Pts: Jerrells 14; Rebs: Chappell 9 Asts: Chappell 5 PIR: Chappell 19	Arena: PalaSerradimigni; Referees: Michele Rossi, Alessandro Martolini, Guido Giovannetti

20 May 2021 Game 5	Umana Reyer Venezia	93–91 (Series: 3-2)	Banco di Sardegna Sassari	Mestre (Venice)
21:00 (CET)	Scoring by quarter: 24-23, 12-26, 27-28, 30-14
Rai Sport, Eurosport Player	Pts: Daye 20; Rebs: Tonut 7 Asts: Tonut 4 PIR: Tonut, Daye 22	Boxscore	Pts: Bilan 26; Rebs: Bendžius 9 Asts: Spissu, Gentile 5 PIR: Bilan 27	Arena: Taliercio; Referees: Manuel Mazzoni, Mark Bartoli, Denny Borgioni

==== Semifinals ====
22 May 2021 Game 1	AX Armani Exchange Milano	81–79 (Series: 1-0)	Umana Reyer Venezia	Assago (Milan)
21:00 (CET)	Scoring by quarter: 20-13, 22-25, 22-17, 17-24
Rai Sport, Eurosport 2	Pts: Shields 25; Rebs: Hines 9 Asts: Hines 4 PIR: Shields 30	Boxscore	Pts: Tonut 18; Rebs: Watt 10; Asts: Daye 3 PIR: Daye, Watt 22	Arena: Mediolanum Forum; Referees: Saverio Lanzarini, Alessandro Vicino, Andrea Bongiorni

24 May 2021 Game 2	AX Armani Exchange Milano	99–65 (Series: 2-0)	Umana Reyer Venezia	Assago (Milan)
20:45 (CET)	Scoring by quarter: 23-7, 31-22, 23-23, 22-13
Rai Sport, Eurosport 2	Pts: Delaney 20; Rebs: Moraschini 7 Asts: Rodríguez 7 PIR: Rodríguez 24	Boxscore	Pts: Watt 15; Rebs: Watt 7 Asts: De Nicolao 3 PIR: Watt 26	Arena: Mediolanum Forum; Referees: Michele Rossi, Guido Giovannetti, Denis Quarta

2 June 2021 Game 3	Umana Reyer Venezia	83–93 (Series: 3-0)	AX Armani Exchange Milano	Mestre (Venice)
21:00 (CET)	Scoring by quarter: 21-21, 17-17, 14-24, 31-31
Rai Sport, Eurosport 2	Pts: Daye 22; Rebs: Stone, Tonut, Daye 5 Asts: Stone, Tonut, De Nicolao 2 PIR: Daye 23	Boxscore	Pts: Punter 19; Rebs: LeDay 7 Asts: Rodríguez, Delaney 5 PIR: Punter, Hines 21	Arena: Taliercio; Referees: Roberto Begnis, Alessandro Martolini, Lorenzo Baldini

=== Eurocup ===
==== Regular season ====
Pos	Team	Pld	W	L	PF	PA	PD	Qualification
1	(Spain) Joventut	10	8	2	849	783	+66	Advance to Top 16
2	(Russia) UNICS	10	6	4	827	797	+30	Advance to Top 16
3	(France) JL Bourg	10	6	4	810	777	+33	Advance to Top 16
4	(Serbia) Partizan NIS	10	6	4	810	784	+26	Advance to Top 16
5	(Turkey) Bahçeşehir Koleji	10	2	8	810	827	−17	
6	(Italy) Umana Reyer Venezia	10	2	8	744	882	−138	

Source: EuroCup Basketball
Rules for classification: All points scored in extra period(s) were not counted in the standings, nor for any tie-break situation.

== See also ==
- 2020–21 LBA season
- 2020–21 EuroCup Basketball
- 2021 Italian Basketball Cup
- 2020 Italian Basketball Supercup
