= 2019–20 Reyer Venezia season =

Physical game played by multiple players

Reyer Venezia
2019-20 season
- President: Federico Casarin
- Head coach: Walter De Raffaele
- Arena: Palasport Giuseppe Taliercio
- LBA: season cancelled (7th)
- EuroCup: season cancelled (quarter finals)
- Coppa Italia: Winners
- Supercoppa: Runners-up

The 2019–20 season is Reyer Venezia's 148th in existence and the club's 10th consecutive season in the top flight of Italian basketball.

== Overview ==
Venezia participates to the 2018-19 edition of the Lega Basket Serie A as the defending champions, after having won in the 2018-19 season.

They won the Italian Cup and they managed to qualify to the playoffs of the EuroCup Basketball.

Unfortunately, though, the 2019-20 season was hit by the coronavirus pandemic that compelled the federation to suspend and later cancel the competition without assigning the title to anyone. Virtus Bologna ended the championship in 1st position. Followed also the early termination of the EuroCup season where Bologna had reached the quarter-finals and Venezia was the only Italian team at winning something, the Italian Cup.

== Kit ==
Supplier: Erreà / Sponsor: Umana

Home	Away

== Players ==
=== Current roster ===
Umana Reyer Venezia roster
Players
Coaches

Pos.	No.	Nat.	Name	Ht.	Wt.	Age
PF	0	(Nigeria)	Udanoh, Ike	2.02 m (6 ft 8 in)	107 kg (236 lb)	37 – 2 August 1989
PG	3	(Italy)	Casarin, Davide	1.96 m (6 ft 5 in)	86 kg (190 lb)	23 – 22 May 2003
G	5	(United States)	Stone, Julyan	1.98 m (6 ft 6 in)	95 kg (209 lb)	37 – 7 December 1988
G/F	6	(Greece)	Bramos, Michael (C)	1.98 m (6 ft 6 in)	102 kg (225 lb)	39 – 27 May 1987
SG	7	(Italy)	Tonut, Stefano	1.94 m (6 ft 4 in)	90 kg (198 lb)	32 – 7 November 1993
PF	9	(United States)	Daye, Austin	2.11 m (6 ft 11 in)	91 kg (201 lb)	38 – 5 June 1988
PG	10	(Italy)	De Nicolao, Andrea	1.85 m (6 ft 1 in)	75 kg (165 lb)	35 – 21 August 1991
PG	12	(Italy)	Filloy, Ariel	1.90 m (6 ft 3 in)	85 kg (187 lb)	39 – 11 March 1987
C	14	(Slovenia)	Vidmar, Gašper	2.10 m (6 ft 11 in)	114 kg (251 lb)	39 – 14 September 1987
SG	15	(United States)	Goudelock, Andrew	1.91 m (6 ft 3 in)	92 kg (203 lb)	37 – 7 December 1988
SG	21	(United States)	Chappell, Jeremy	1.91 m (6 ft 3 in)	91 kg (201 lb)	39 – 10 June 1987
F/C	22	(Italy)	Mazzola, Valerio	2.05 m (6 ft 9 in)	111 kg (245 lb)	38 – 7 March 1988
C	29	(Italy)	Pellegrino, Francesco	2.10 m (6 ft 11 in)	110 kg (243 lb)	35 – 6 August 1991
G/F	30	(Argentina)	Cerella, Bruno	1.94 m (6 ft 4 in)	93 kg (205 lb)	40 – 30 July 1986
C	50	(United States)	Watt, Mitchell	2.08 m (6 ft 10 in)	102 kg (225 lb)	36 – 14 December 1989

Head coach

- (Italy) Walter De Raffaele

Assistant coach(es)

- (Italy) Gianluca Tucci
- (Italy) Alberto Billio
- (Italy) Massimo Galli

Legend

- (C) Team captain
- Injured

- Roster
Updated: February 25, 2019

Note: Flags indicate national team eligibility at FIBA-sanctioned events. Players may hold other non-FIBA nationalities not displayed.

=== Depth chart ===
Pos.	Starting 5	Bench 1	Bench 2	Bench 3
C	Mitchell Watt	Gašper Vidmar	Francesco Pellegrino
PF	Austin Daye	Valerio Mazzola	Ike Udanoh
SF	Michael Bramos	Bruno Cerella
SG	Jeremy Chappell	Stefano Tonut	Davide Casarin
PG	Andrea De Nicolao	Julyan Stone	Andrew Goudelock	Ariel Filloy

6+6 format (colours: Italian or homegrown players; foreign players; young players)

=== Squad changes ===
==== In ====
No.	Pos.	Nat.	Name	Age	Moving from		Type	Ends	Transfer fee	Date	Source
12	PG	(Italy)	Ariel Filloy	32	Scandone Avellino	(Italy)	1 year	June 2020	Free	5 July 2019	
0	PF	(United States) (Nigeria)	Ike Udanoh	29	Scandone Avellino	(Italy)	1 year	June 2020	Free	9 July 2019	
21	SG	(United States)	Jeremy Chappell	32	New Basket Brindisi	(Italy)	1 year	June 2020	Free	22 July 2019	
29	C	(Italy)	Francesco Pellegrino	27	Amici Udinese	(Italy)	1 year	June 2020	Free	29 July 2019	
15	SG	(United States)	Andrew Goudelock	30	Shandong Heroes	(China)	1 year	June 2020	Undisclosed	21 October 2019	

==== Out ====
No.	Pos.	Nat.	Name	Age	Moving to		Type	Transfer fee	Date	Source
1	G/F	(United States)	D. J. Kennedy	29	Pınar Karşıyaka	(Turkey)	end of contract	Free	1 July 2019	
17	SF	(United States)	Deron Washington	33	Pallacanestro Trieste	(Italy)	end of contract	Free	1 July 2019	
19	C	(Italy)	Paul Biligha	29	Olimpia Milano	(Italy)	end of contract	Free	1 July 2019	
21	G	(Italy)	Marco Giuri	30	JuveCaserta	(Italy)	end of contract	Free	1 July 2019	
77	SG	(Czech Republic)	Tomáš Kyzlink	26	Virtus Roma	(Italy)	end of contract	Free	1 July 2019	
0	PG	(Georgia (country)) (United States)	MarQuez Haynes	32	Paris Basketball	(France)	mutual consent	Undisclosed	10 July 2019	

==== Confirmed ====
No.	Pos.	Nat.	Name	Age	Moving from		Type	Ends	Transfer fee	Date	Source
7	SG	(Italy)	Stefano Tonut	25	Pallacanestro Trieste	(Italy)	2 + 5 years	June 2023	Free	1 July 2015	
6	SF	(Greece) (United States)	Michael Bramos	32	Panathinaikos	(Greece)	6 years	June 2021	Free	28 August 2015	
10	PG	(Italy)	Andrea De Nicolao	28	Reggio Emilia	(Italy)	2 + 2 years	June 2021	Free	13 July 2017	
50	C	(United States)	Mitchell Watt	29	Shabab Al Ahli Dubai	(United Arab Emirates)	1 + 3 years	June 2021	Free	18 July 2017	
30	G/F	(Argentina) (Italy)	Bruno Cerella	33	Olimpia Milano	(Italy)	1 + 1 + 1 years	June 2020	Free	22 August 2017	
9	PF	(United States)	Austin Daye	31	Hapoel Jerusalem	(Israel)	2 + 1 years	June 2020	Free	29 January 2018	
22	PF	(Italy)	Valerio Mazzola	31	Auxilium Torino	(Italy)	2 years	June 2020	Free	18 July 2018	
5	PG	(United States)	Julyan Stone	30	Charlotte Hornets	(United States)	2 + 1 years	June 2020 + 2021	Free	25 July 2018	
14	C	(Slovenia)	Gašper Vidmar	32	Banvit	(Turkey)	1 + 1 years	June 2020	Free	3 October 2018	

==== Coach ====
Nat.	Name	Age.	Last team		Type	Ends	Date	Source
(Italy)	Walter De Raffaele	50	Reyer Venezia (assistant)	(Italy)	1 + 1 + 3	2021	12 March 2016	

== Competitions ==
=== SuperCup ===
Venezia took part in the 25th edition of the Italian Basketball Supercup as the 2019 LBA Finals and Italian Championship winners. They lost in the finals against Dinamo Sassari, team against which Venezia won the championship finals.

21 September 2019 Semifinals	Umana Reyer Venezia	78–73	New Basket Brindisi	Bari
20:45 (CEST)	Scoring by quarter: 6–19, 17–14, 31–11, 24–29
Eurosport	Pts: Daye 26; Rebs: Bramos, Watt 5 Asts: Daye 4	Boxscore	Pts: Banks 23; Rebs: Radivojević 8 Asts: Martin 3	Arena: PalaFlorio

22 September 2019 Finals	Banco di Sardegna Sassari	83–80(OT)	Umana Reyer Venezia	Bari
20:30	Scoring by quarter: 22–11, 19–13, 17–24, 11–21, Overtime: 14–11
Eurosport	Pts: Jerrells 19; Rebs: Evans 8 Asts: three players 3 PIR: McLean 21	Boxscore	Pts: Chappell 19; Rebs: Bramos, Watt 7 Asts: Chappell, Stone 3 PIR: Chappell 21	Arena: PalaFlorio

=== Serie A ===
Pos	Team	Pld	W	L	PF	PA	PD	Qualification or relegation
5	Happy Casa Brindisi	21	13	8	1776	1696	+80	Qualification for Champions League
6	Vanoli Cremona	20	12	8	1627	1617	+10	
7	Umana Reyer Venezia	21	11	10	1638	1582	+56	Qualification for EuroCup
8	Pompea Fortitudo Bologna	21	11	10	1624	1670	−46	Qualification for Champions League
9	Dolomiti Energia Trento	21	11	10	1635	1665	−30	Qualification for EuroCup

Updated to match(es) played on 9 February 2020. Source: LBA

=== EuroCup ===
==== Regular season ====
Pos	Team	Pld	W	L	PF	PA	PD	Qualification
1	(Italy) Umana Reyer Venezia	10	8	2	759	713	+46	Advance to Top 16
2	(Serbia) Partizan NIS	10	7	3	767	722	+45	Advance to Top 16
3	(Turkey) Tofaş	10	5	5	804	822	−18	Advance to Top 16
4	(Lithuania) Rytas	10	4	6	800	811	−11	Advance to Top 16
5	(Russia) Lokomotiv Kuban	10	4	6	797	780	+17	
6	(France) Limoges CSP	10	2	8	748	827	−79	

Source: EuroCup Basketball
Rules for classification: All points scored in extra period(s) were not counted in the standings, nor for any tie-break situation.

==== Top 16 ====
Pos	Team	Pld	W	L	PF	PA	PD	Qualification
1	(Greece) Promitheas	6	4	2	440	383	+57	Advance to quarterfinals
2	(Italy) Umana Reyer Venezia	6	4	2	452	462	−10	Advance to quarterfinals
3	(Germany) EWE Baskets Oldenburg	6	2	4	474	501	−27	
4	(Italy) Germani Brescia Leonessa	6	2	4	421	441	−20	

Source: EuroCup Basketball
Rules for classification: All points scored in extra period(s) were not counted in the standings, nor for any tie-break situation.

=== Italian Cup ===
Venezia qualified to the 2020 Italian Basketball Cup having ended the first half of the season in 8th place. They won the competition for the first time in their history.

13 February 2020 Quarter finals	Segafredo Virtus Bologna	81–82(OT)	Umana Reyer Venezia	Pesaro
20:45	Scoring by quarter: 11-21, 21-16, 15-13, 21-18, Overtime: 13-14
Eurosport, Rai Sport	Pts: Marković 18; Rebs: Hunter 10; Asts: Teodosić 6 PIR: Weems 20	Boxscore	Pts: Tonut 16; Rebs: Vidmar 11; Asts: De Nicolao 3 PIR: Vidmar 17	Arena: Adriatic Arena

15 February 2020 Semifinals	AX Armani Exchange Milano	63–67	Umana Reyer Venezia	Pesaro
18:00	Scoring by quarter: 22–15, 9–14, 13–25, 19–13
Eurosport, Rai Sport	Pts: Rodríguez 15; Rebs: Scola, Tarczewski 9 Asts: Rodríguez 3 PIR: Scola 19	Boxscore	Pts: Watt 16; Rebs: Watt 10; Asts: three players 3 PIR: Watt 15	Arena: Adriatic Arena; Referees: Tolga Sahin, Manuel Mazzoni, Guido Giovannetti

16 February 2020	Umana Reyer Venezia	73–67	Happy Casa Brindisi	Pesaro
18:00	Scoring by quarter: 18–8, 16–22, 16–13, 23–24
Eurosport, Rai Sport	Pts: Watt 17; Rebs: Watt 10; Asts: Tonut 4 PIR: Watt 19	Boxscore	Pts: Banks 27; Rebs: Brown 12; Asts: Thompson 4 PIR: Banks 26	Arena: Adriatic Arena; Referees: Carmelo Paternico', Saverio Lanzarini, Manuel Mazzoni
