= Jaime Smith =

American basketball player and coach

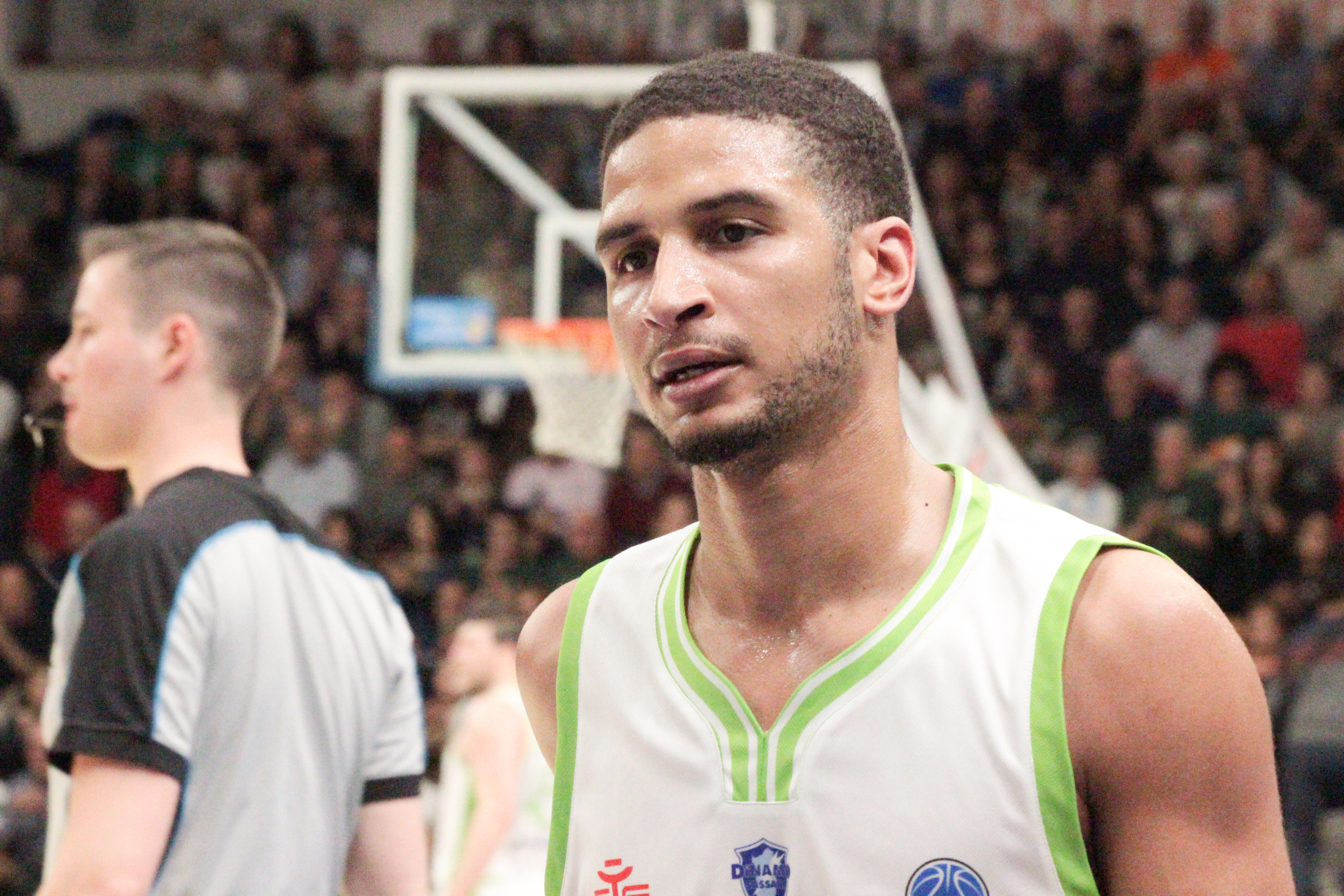
- Smith in Italy with Dinamo Sassari

UIC Flames
- Position: Assistant coach
- League: Missouri Valley Conference

Personal information
- Born: July 11, 1989 (age 37) Birmingham, Alabama, U.S.
- Listed height: 6 ft 3 in (1.91 m)
- Listed weight: 183 lb (83 kg)

Career information
- High school: Hoover (Hoover, Alabama)
- College: Alabama–Huntsville (2009–2013)
- NBA draft: 2013: undrafted
- Playing career: 2013–2023
- Coaching career: 2023–present

Career history

Playing
- 2013–2014: Lusitânia
- 2014–2015: Fribourg Olympic
- 2015–2016: Liège
- 2016–2017: Khimik
- 2017–2018: Cantù
- 2018–2019: Dinamo Sassari
- 2019–2020: Teksüt Bandırma
- 2020: Dinamo Sassari
- 2020–2021: Cantù
- 2022–2023: ADA Blois

Coaching
- 2023–2024: Longwood (DPD)
- 2024–present: UIC (assistant)

Career highlights
- FIBA Europe Cup champion (2019)

James Elliott "Jaime" Smith (born July 11, 1989) is an American basketball coach and former player who is currently an assistant coach at the University of Illinois Chicago.

== Professional career ==
In June 2015 Smith signed with the Belgium club Liège Basket, after a season with the Fribourg Olympic in Switzerland.

On June 10, 2017, Jaime Smith signed with the Italian basketball club, Pallacanestro Cantù, in the top-tier LBA.

On June 7, 2018, Smith became new player for Dinamo Sassari.

On August 1, 2019, he has signed contract with Teksüt Bandırma of the Turkish Basketball Super League (BSL).

On March 2, 2020, he has signed with Dinamo Sassari of the Italian Lega Basket Serie A.

On July 11, 2020, he has signed with Pallacanestro Cantù of the Lega Basket Serie A (LBA).

On July 5, 2022, after recovering from a torn ACL, he signed with the ADA Blois of the LNB Pro A.

== Coaching career ==
After the conclusion of his playing career, Smith returned to the United States as a coach. After spending a year as the director of player development at Longwood, he accepted a position as an assistant coach at UIC.

== Personal life ==
Smith's older brother, Joe Troy Smith, also played professional basketball.
