= Marco Giuri =

Italian basketball player (born 1988)

APU Udine
- Position: Point guard / shooting guard
- League: Serie A2 Basket

Personal information
- Born: 8 July 1988 (age 38) Brindisi, Italy
- Listed height: 6 ft 5 in (1.96 m)
- Listed weight: 218 lb (99 kg)

Career information
- Playing career: 2005–present

Career history
- 2005–2006: Virtus Siena
- 2006–2007: Junior Casale
- 2007: →Pallacanestro Vigevano
- 2007–2009: Basket Livorno
- 2009–2010: Aurora Jesi
- 2010–2011: Potenza
- 2011–2012: New Basket Brindisi
- 2012–2013: Basket Barcellona
- 2013–2014: Basket Ferentino
- 2014–2015: Scaligera Verona
- 2015–2017: Juvecaserta
- 2017–2018: New Basket Brindisi
- 2018–2019: Reyer Venezia
- 2019-2020: JuveCaserta
- 2020-present: APU Udine

Career highlights
- 3× Italian LNP Cup winner (2012, 2015, 2022)
Medals
Men's basketball
Representing Italy
FIBA Europe Under-20 Championship
Bronze medal – third place	2007 Slovenia/Italy

Marco Giuri (born 8 July 1988) is an Italian professional basketball player who last played for APU Udine of the Italian Serie A2 Basket second tier national league. He is a 6 ft 4 in (1.93 m) combo guard.

== Professional career ==
Marco Giuri began his professional basketball career with Virtus Siena in Serie B from the 2005–06 season. He played 27 matches of regular-season and two matches of play-out. For the following season he was with A.S. Junior Pallacanestro Casale, in Serie A2. Giuri played just eleven matches because he was loaned to Basket Vigevano again in Serie B.

From 2007 to 2009 he played 52 games in Serie A2 with Basket Livorno, and from 2009 to 2010 with Aurora Basket Jesi.

In December 2011 he was bought by Enel Brindisi in Serie A2. With the Brindisi based club, he won the LNP Cup and achieved the promotion to the LBA.

In 2012 he was with Basket Barcellona and in 2013 with Basket Ferentino. For the 2014–15 season in Serie A2 Giuri played with Scaligera Basket in Verona.

From 2015–16 season, Marco Giuri is a new player of Juvecaserta in LBA.

On 27 June 2017 Giuri signed a deal with New Basket Brindisi, where he came back after 5 years. On 6 July 2018 the Italian player left Brindisi after one year.

On 12 July 2018 Giuri signed a two-year deal with Reyer Venezia.

=== Italy National Team ===
Marco Giuri played with the U-20 Italy National Basketball Team from 2007 to 2008. In 2007 he took part to the FIBA Under-20 Championship, where he won the bronze medal.

== Honours and titles ==
=== Team ===
- Italian LNP Cup winner (2): 2012, 2015
