= Daniele Magro =

Italian basketball player

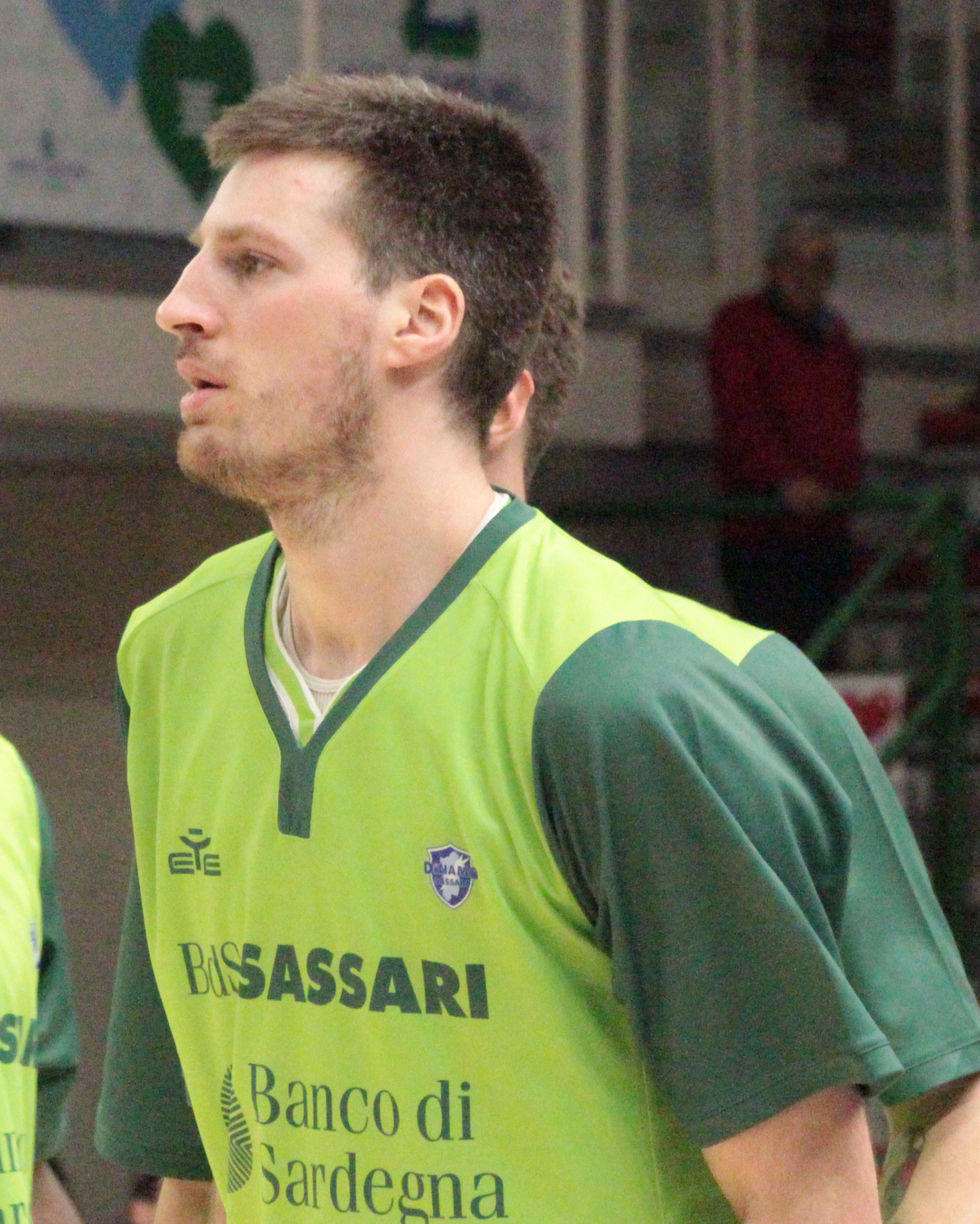
- Magro with Dinamo Sassari in 2019

No. 18 – Pistoia Basket 2000
- Position: Center
- League: Serie A2

Personal information
- Born: April 14, 1987 (age 39) Padua, Italy
- Listed height: 2.08 m (6 ft 10 in)
- Listed weight: 112 kg (247 lb)

Career information
- NBA draft: 2009: undrafted
- Playing career: 2005–present

Career history
- 2005: Benetton Treviso
- 2005–2006: Istrana
- 2006–2009: Gattamelata Padova
- 2009–2014: Reyer Venezia
- 2009–2010: →Fulgor Fidenza
- 2010–2011: →Pallacanestro Trieste
- 2014-2015: Pistoia Basket 2000
- 2015–2016: EA7 Emporio Armani Milano
- 2016–2018: Pistoia Basket 2000
- 2018–2020: Dinamo Sassari
- 2020: Brescia Leonessa
- 2020–2021: Eurobasket Roma
- 2021–2023: Pistoia Basket 2000
- 2023–2024: Guerino Vanoli Basket
- 2024–2025: Pallacanestro Forlì
- 2025–present: Pistoia Basket 2000

Career highlights
- FIBA Europe Cup champion (2019); 2× Serie A All-Star (2012, 2014); Italian Cup winner (2016)

Daniele Magro (born April 14, 1987) is an Italian professional basketball player for Pistoia Basket 2000 of the Italian Serie A2, second tier national league, as a center.

== Professional career ==
The Padua native first played for local side Pallacanestro Piove di Sacco from which he was recruited by another Veneto club, Benetton Treviso - at the time one of the best Italian teams - to play for their junior team in 2003.

Two Under 19 championship finals with Benetton followed in two years but in 2005 he left the club and joined Istrana in the amateur Serie C.

After one year in Istrana he returned to his home to play for Gattamelata Padova, also in the amateur divisions.

He was noticed by neighbouring club Reyer Venezia who invited him to train with the club in June 2007 with an eye of adding young players following new league regulations. He was later signed by Reyer, then in Legadue, and alternated between the Reyer Under 21 and Padova squads, losing the promotion playoffs for the third division with the latter in 2009.

Magro would still play in that division as he was loaned by Reyer to Serie A Dilettanti clubs Siram Fidenza (in Italian) in 2009-10 and Pallacanestro Trieste in 2010–11 to help him gain experience at a higher level.

He acquitted himself well enough and was recalled to Venice to be incorporated into the first team, that had been promoted to the first division since then, for the 2011-2012 season.

Magro made his Serie A debut in 2011 and later scored his first points in the league, which he described as the “easiest basket in my life” against the champions Montepaschi Siena. The center scarcely played that season, averaging under six minutes per game, but was called up for the Serie A All Star Game as one of the few Italian centers in the first division.

The next season, he played more though he remained a bench option, he again made the All Star Game and posted solid figures as Reyer reached the playoffs for the second successive season, losing in the first round once more. His third year for the gold and maroons halted that progress, both for Magro, who played under ten minutes per game in 2013–14, and the team who missed the playoff places.

Magro left Veneto to look for more game time, moving to Tuscany to join Pistoia Basket 2000 for the 2014-15 season.

In July 2015, Magro joined Italian powerhouse EA7 Emporio Armani Milano - who also play in the Euroleague, Europe's premier club competition.

On July 1, 2018, Magro left Pistoia Basket 2000 after 2 seasons and signed a deal with Dinamo Sassari.

At the end of the contract, June 2020, he didn't renew with Sassari and signed a one-month deal with Brescia Leonessa for the 2020 Supercup.

On November 24, 2020, Magro signed with Eurobasket Roma in the Italian Serie A2 Basket, second tier national league.

On July 13, 2025, he signed with Pistoia Basket 2000 of the Italian Serie A2.

== International career ==
Magro was called up to Italy squads starting from 2012 but hardly played, he was more active for the Italy B squad, playing at the 2013 Mediterranean Games.

After a slew of injuries for the senior squad, with Andrea Bargnani and Angelo Gigli amongst many to pull out, left Italy bereft of big men, the 2.08m player was called to the senior for EuroBasket 2013. He barely played as Italy finished 8th.

Magro was called up to the Italy squad for the FIBA EuroBasket 2015 qualification games against Russia but was virtually unused and has seemingly slipped out of contention for the 2015 tournament.

== Career statistics ==
=== Serie A ===
==== Regular season ====
Legend
GP	Games played	GS	Games started	MPG	Minutes per game
FG%	Field goal percentage	3P%	3-point field goal percentage	FT%	Free throw percentage
RPG	Rebounds per game	APG	Assists per game	SPG	Steals per game
BPG	Blocks per game	PPG	Points per game	**Bold**	Career high

Year	Team	GP	GS	MPG	FG%	3P%	FT%	RPG	APG	SPG	BPG	PPG
2011-12	Umana Venezia	16	0	5.6	60.9	0.0	50.0	1.8	0.1	0.0	0.1	1.9
2012-13	Umana Venezia	**28**	**16**	**11.2**	67.9	0.0	66.7	3.1	**0.3**	**0.3**	0.2	**3.3**
2013-14	Umana Venezia	**28**	3	9.0	**70.0**	0.0	58.8	2.8	0.2	0.3	0.4	2.9
2014-15	Giorgio Tesi Group Pistoia	26	2	11.0	60.0	0.0	**78.3**	**3.2**	**0.3**	**0.3**	**0.5**	3.0
Career		98	21	9.2	64.7	0.0	63.4	2.7	0.2	0.2	0.3	2.8

==== Playoffs ====
Year	Team	GP	GS	MPG	FG%	3P%	FT%	RPG	APG	SPG	BPG	PPG
2011-12	Umana Venezia	**3**	0	5.6	66.7	0.0	0.0	0.3	0.0	0.0	0.0	1.3
2012-13	Umana Venezia	**3**	**2**	**8.3**	**83.3**	0.0	0.0	**2.3**	0.0	0.0	**0.7**	**3.3**
Career		6	2	6.9	75.0	0.0	0.0	1.3	0.0	0.0	0.3	2.3

== Personal life ==
The nephew of former player Luigi Magro (in Italian) who mostly played in the second division. As a child Daniele used to go see his games for Petrarca Padova and strived to follow his example.

His grandmother owns a restaurant, Bion in his hometown Padua where his parents also work, he inherited that love of food and likes to cook as well.
