= Giacomo Devecchi =

Italian professional basketball player

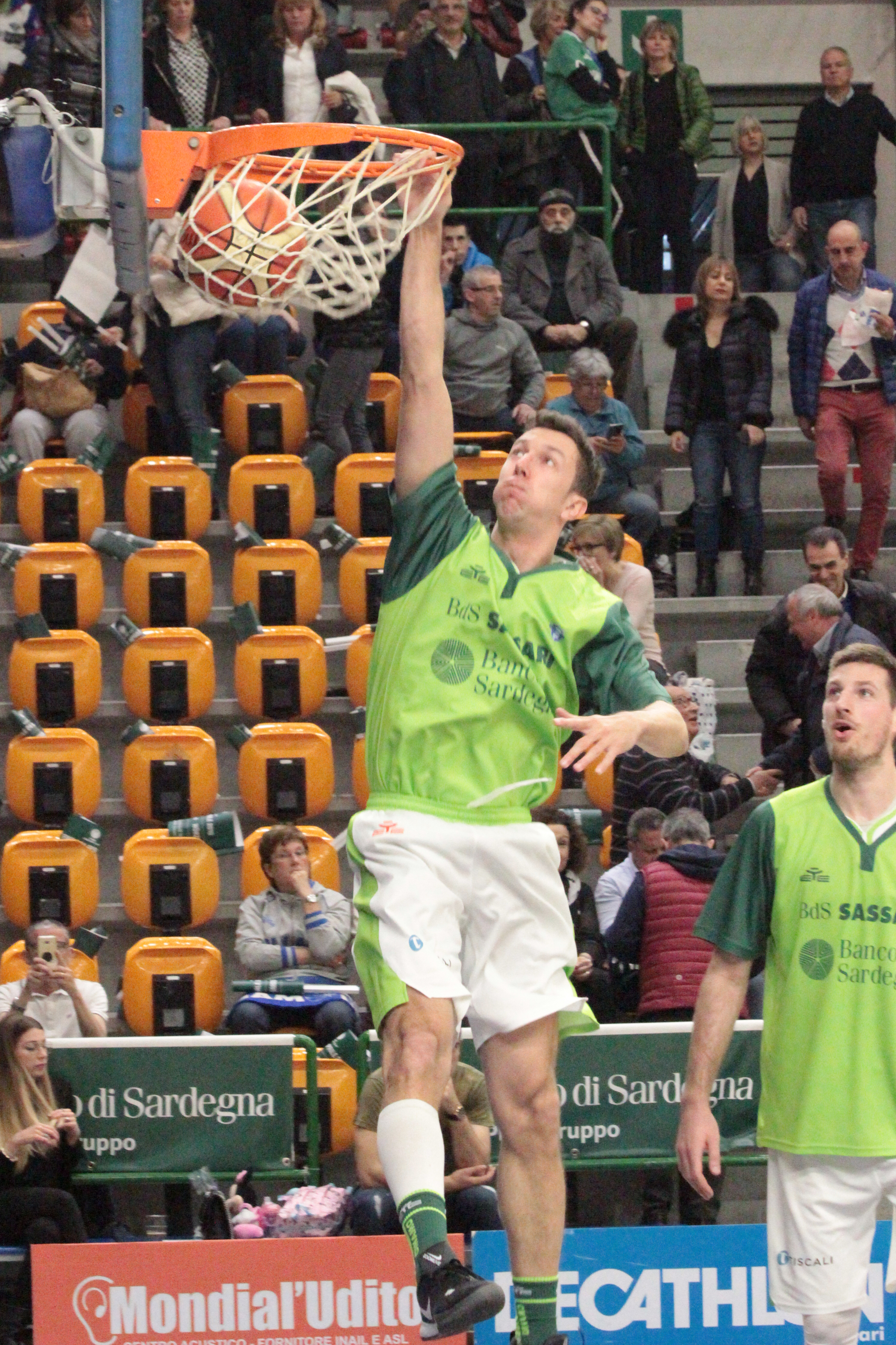
- Devecchi with Dinamo in 2019

No. 8 – Dinamo Basket Sassari
- Position: Small forward / shooting guard
- League: LBA

Personal information
- Born: April 2, 1985 (age 41) Sant'Angelo Lodigiano, Lodi, Italy
- Listed height: 1.96 m (6 ft 5 in)
- Listed weight: 88 kg (194 lb)

Career information
- Playing career: 2001–present

Career history
- 2001–2004: Olimpia Milano
- 2004–2006: Sutor Montegranaro
- 2006–present: Dinamo Sassari

Career highlights
- FIBA Europe Cup champion (2019); Lega Basket Serie A winner (2015); 2× Italian Basketball Cup winner (2014, 2015); Italian Basketball Supercup winner (2014); 2× Serie A2 Basket winner (2006, 2009)

Giacomo Devecchi (born April 2, 1985), also called Jack Devecchi, is an Italian professional basketball player for Dinamo Sassari in the Italian Lega Basket Serie A (LBA). He is a 6 ft 5 in (1.96 m) small forward and shooting guard.

== Professional career ==
Giacomo Devecchi made his debut in Lega Basket Serie A with Olimpia Milano in 2001. In 2004 he went to Sutor Montegranaro, but he was later loaned to Dinamo Sassari in 2006 in the second-tier of the Italian league pyramid, Serie A2. With Dinamo Sassari he achieved the promotion to LBA beating 3–1 Veroli Basket in the playoffs.

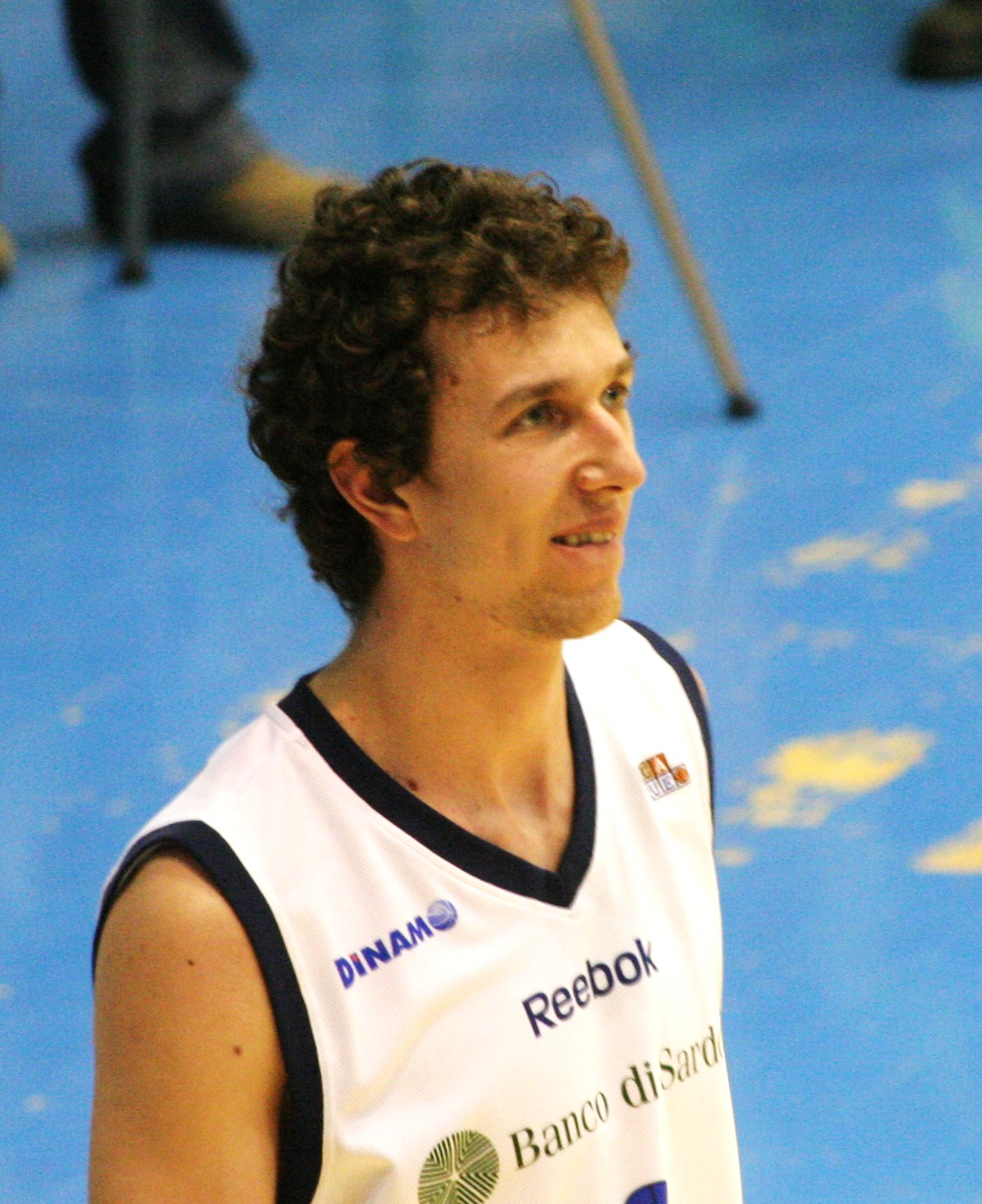
Devecchi in 2009

In July 2010 he signed a contract with Sassari for one season. At the end of the 2011-12 season his team got the 4th place in the League table, and they were eliminated just at the playoffs' semifinals. So in July 2012 the Club decided to renew the contract with Devecchi for three more seasons. In 2016 he became the new team captain.

== Honours ==
Dinamo Sassari

- Lega Basket Serie A: 2014–15
- Italian Basketball Cup (2): 2014, 2015
- Italian Basketball Supercup: 2014
- FIBA Europe Cup: 2018–19

Sutor Montegranaro

- Serie A2 Basket (2): 2005–06, 2008–09

== Personal life ==
Devecchi is a first cousin of NBA player Danilo Gallinari.
