= Ousmane Diop (basketball) =

Senegalese-Italian basketball player (born 2000)

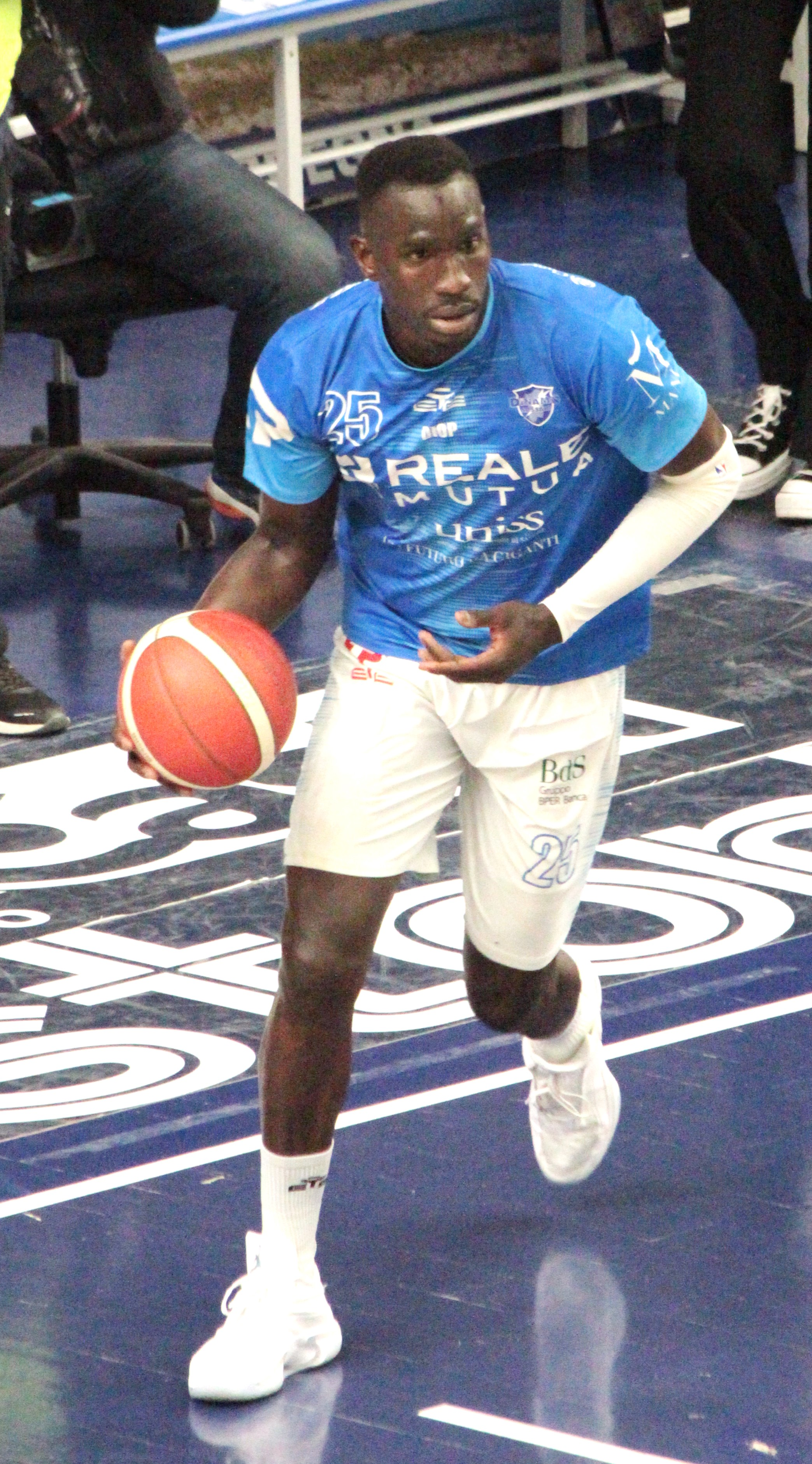
- Diop with Dinamo Sassari in 2023

No. 6 – Olimpia Milano
- Position: Center
- League: LBA; EuroLeague

Personal information
- Born: February 19, 2000 (age 26) Rufisque, Senegal
- Listed height: 6 ft 8.25 in (2.04 m)
- Listed weight: 220 lb (100 kg)

Career information
- Playing career: 2018–present

Career history
- 2018–2024: Dinamo Sassari
- 2018–2019: →Dinamo Cagliari
- 2019–2021: →Basket Torino
- 2024–present: Olimpia Milano

Career highlights
- FIBA Europe Cup champion (2019); Lega Serie A champion (2026); Italian Cup winner (2026); 3× Italian Supercup winner (2024–2026); Serie A2 MVP (2021)

Ousmane Diop (born February 19, 2000) is a Senegalese-Italian professional basketball player for Olimpia Milano of the Lega Basket Serie A (LBA) and the EuroLeague. He plays at the center position.

== Professional career ==
He made his debut in Italy in the 2016–17 season of the Serie A2 league, in Pallacanestro Udine, a team with which, in the following season, he played in the play-offs of the East Group. In August 2018 he signed a four-year contract with the Dinamo Sassari.
