= Palasport Roberta Serradimigni =

Indoor sports arena in Sassari, Italy

- PalaSerradimigni, Palazzetto, Palas
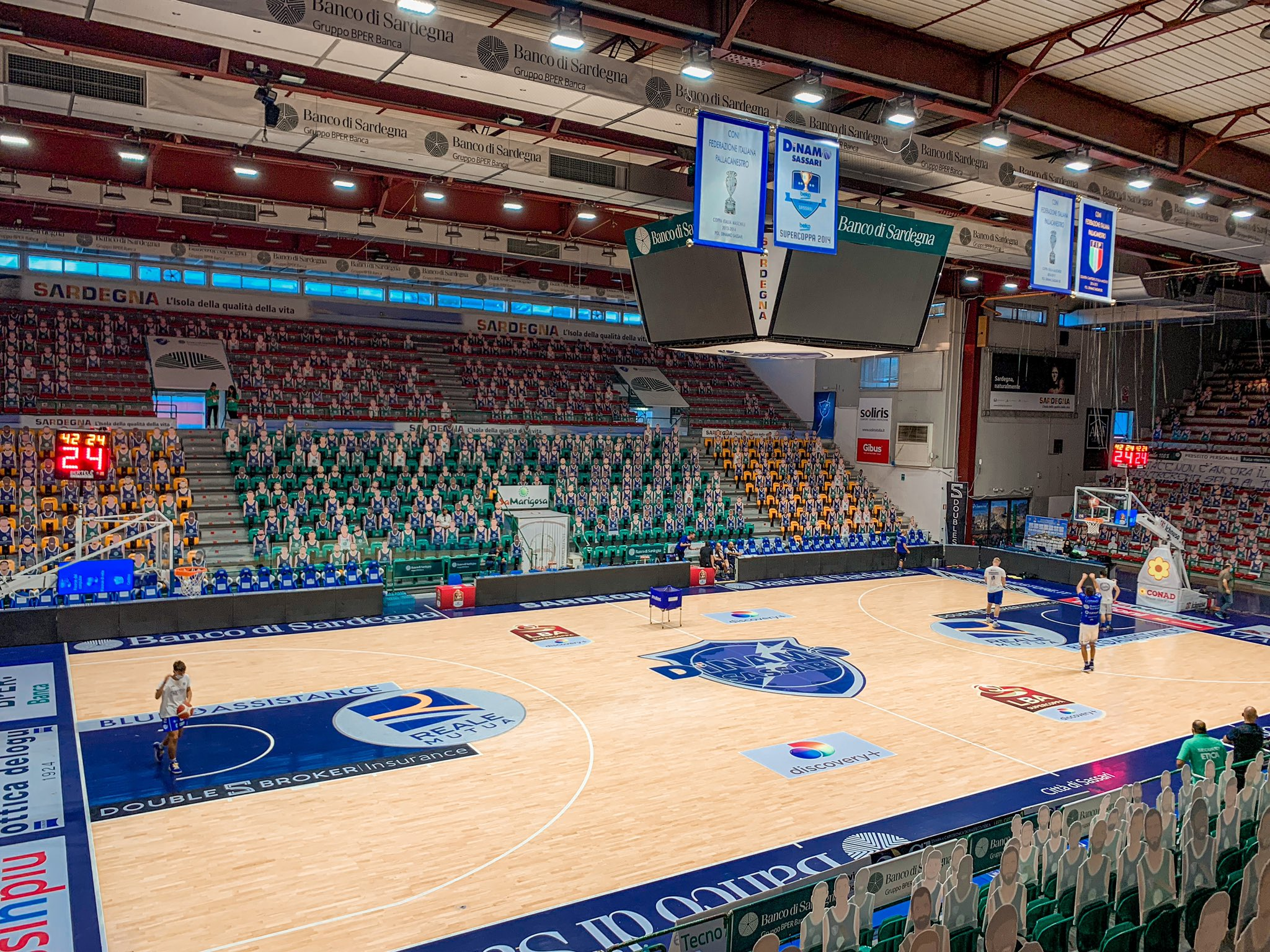
- Interactive map of Palasport Roberta Serradimigni
- Former names: PalaSegni
- Location: Sassari, Sardinia, Italy
- Coordinates: 40.7171°N 8.5832°E
- Owner: City of Sassari
- Capacity: Basketball: 5,000 (current); 5,600 (with future expansion)
- Surface: Parquet

Construction
- Groundbreaking: 1980
- Opened: 1981
- Renovated: 1992, 2005, 2009, 2014
- Expanded: 1992, 2014

Tenant
- Dinamo Basket Sassari

Palasport Roberta Serradimigni, commonly known as PalaSerradimigni, is a multi-use indoor sporting arena that is located in Sassari, Sardinia, Italy. The arena can be used to host basketball, volleyball, and handball games. The current seating capacity of the arena for basketball games is 5,000.

== History ==
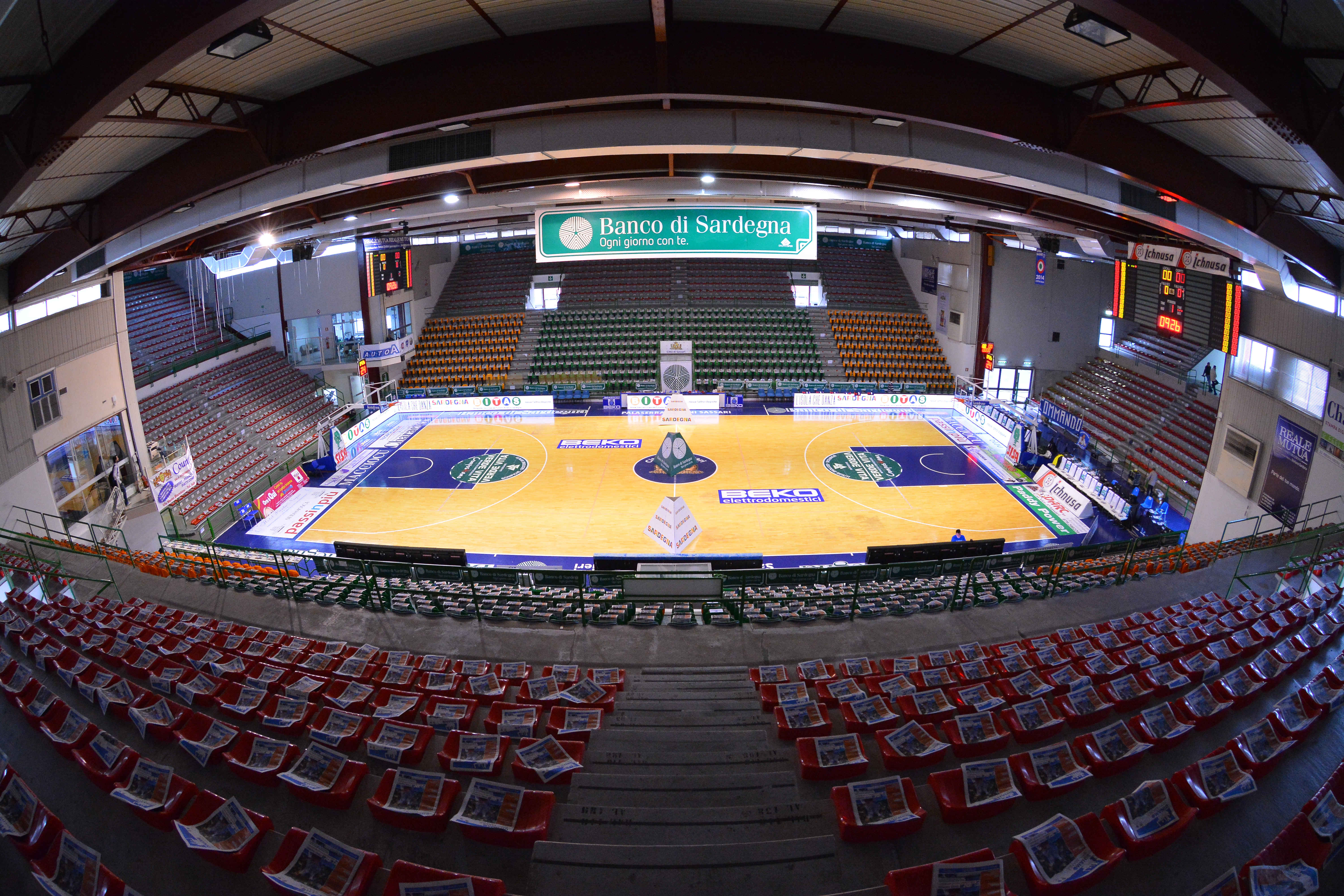
Panorama view of the arena (2014)

PalaSerradimigni was officially opened in 1981. The arena originally had a seating capacity of 2,500. In 1992, the seating capacity of the arena was increased to 4,532. In 2005, the arena's parquet flooring was updated and replaced.

In 2006, the arena was named after Roberta Serradimigni, who died in a car accident at the age of 32, and who is considered to be one of the best basketball players from Sardinia. In 2009, the protective glass that was around the court was removed, and the retractable hanging baskets were replaced with the new floor level modern regulation baskets. A commemorative plaque in honor of Roberta Serradimigni, was added to the arena in 2012.

The seating capacity of the arena was increased to 4,984 during the end of the 2013–14 basketball season. The seating capacity was then increased to 5,000 for the start of the 2014–15 basketball season, in order to meet the minimum Euroleague arena standards, as the arena's tenants, Dinamo Basket Sassari, qualified to play in the Euroleague 2014–15 season. A planned future expansion project to the arena will increase the seating capacity to 5,600.

== Concerts ==
| Date: | Concert: | Tour: | spectators: |
|---|---|---|---|
| 6 January 1989 | Litfiba | Litfiba 3 Tour | |
| 7 March 1991 | Litfiba | El Diablo Tour | |
| 30 September 1994 | Ramones | ? | |
| 24 April 1997 | Fabrizio De André | ? | |
| 25 April 1997 | Fabrizio De André | ? | |
| 26 April 1997 | Fabrizio De André | ? | |
| 28 December 2000 | Nomadi | ? | |
| 2 April 2002 | Subsonica | ? | |
| 27 February 2003 | Antonello Venditti | ? | |

== See also ==
- List of indoor arenas in Italy
- Stadio Vanni Sanna
- Sassari
