= Palasport Giuseppe Taliercio =

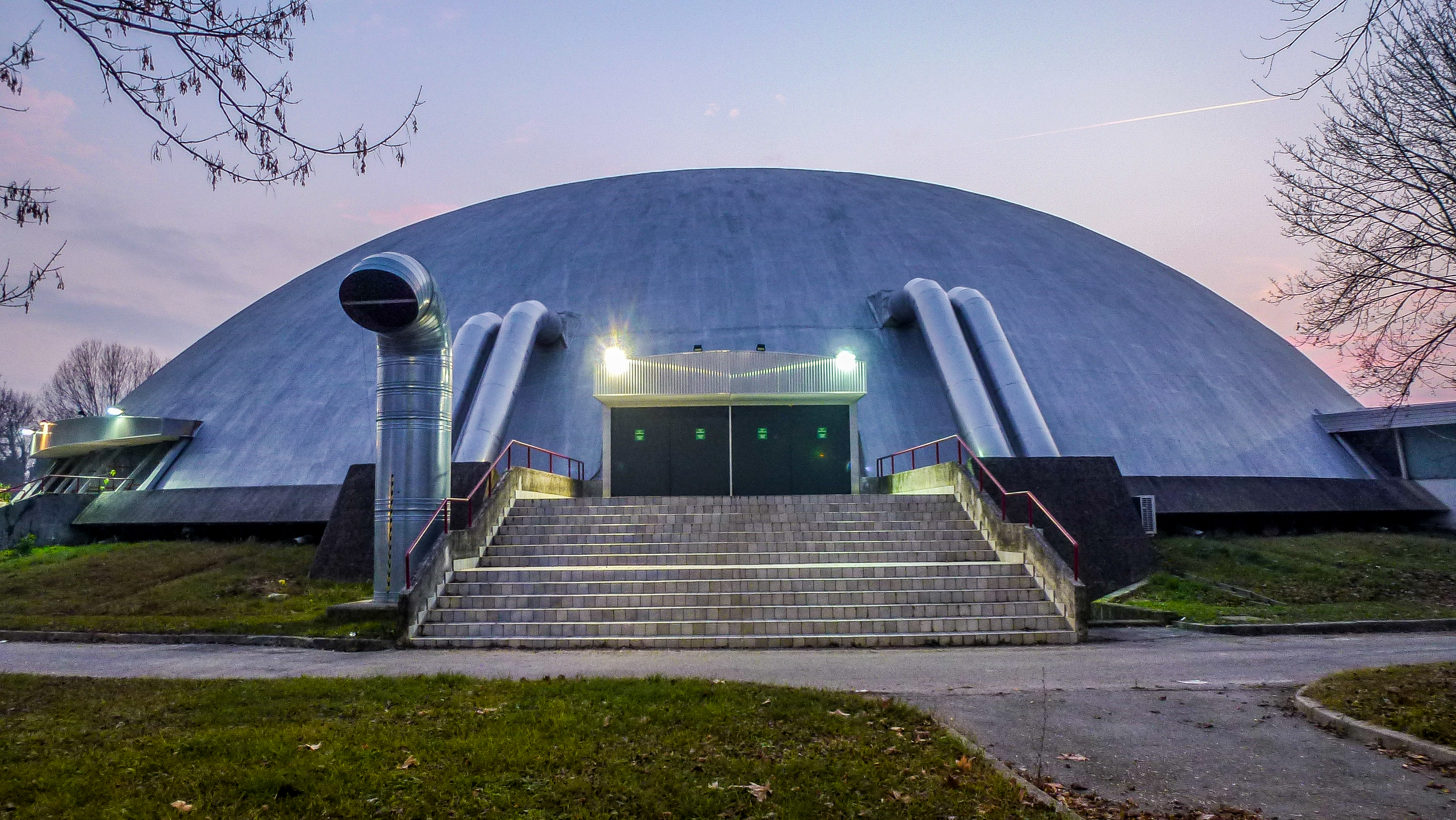
- Side entrance of Palasport Giuseppe Taliercio
- Interactive map of Palasport Giuseppe Taliercio
- Address: Via Porto di Cavergnago 47
- Location: Mestre, Venice, Italy
- Coordinates: 45.4885°N 12.2785°E
- Owner: Venice
- Capacity: 3,509
- Type: Indoor arena

Construction
- Groundbreaking: 1977
- Opened: 1978
- Renovated: 2012

Tenant
- Reyer Venezia

Palasport Giuseppe Taliercio is an indoor sporting arena that is located in Mestre, Venice, Italy. It is primarily used to host indoor sporting events, such as basketball games, concerts, and plays. The arena is named after Giuseppe Taliercio. The seating capacity of the arena is 3,509 spectators for basketball games.

== History ==
Palasport Giuseppe Taliercio opened in 1978. It was used as one of the host arenas of the 1979 EuroBasket. It has most notably been used as the home arena of the Italian basketball club, Reyer Venezia Mestre, of the Lega Basket Serie A. The Italian club Basket Mestre 1958 also used the arena at one time.

The arena was renovated and expanded in the year 2012.

== See also ==
- List of indoor arenas in Italy
