= Walter De Raffaele =

Italian basketball player and coach

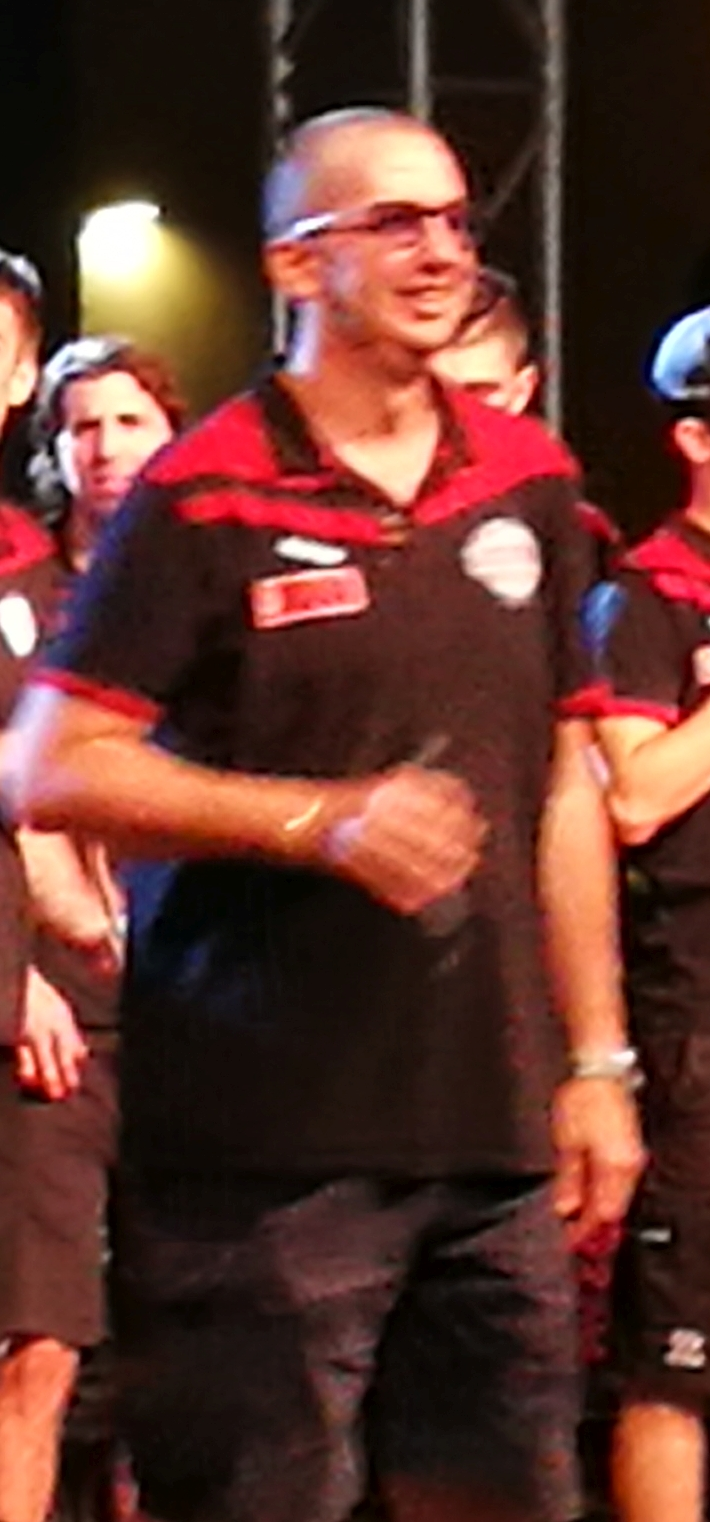

Personal information
- Born: 31 October 1968; 58 years ago Livorno, Italy

Career information
- Playing career: 1987–1997
- Position: Point guard
- Coaching career: 2000–present

Career history

Playing
- 1987–1989: Libertas Livorno
- 1992–1993: Pallacanestro Marsala
- 1993–1994: Aurora Desio
- 1994–1996: Olimpia Pistoia
- 1996–1997: Petrarca

Coaching
- 2000–2004: Livorno (assistant)
- 2004–2005: Livorno
- 2005: Viola Reggio Calabria
- 2006–2008: Unione Cestistica Casalpusterlengo
- 2008–2010: Pavia
- 2010–2011: Scaligera Verona
- 2011–2016: Reyer Venezia Mestre (assistant)
- 2016–2023: Reyer Venezia
- 2023–2025: Derthona Basket

Career highlights
- As head coach: 2× Italian League champion (2017, 2019); Italian Cup champion (2020); FIBA Europe Cup champion (2018)

Walter De Raffaele (born 31 October 1968) is an Italian professional basketball coach and former player. He was most recently the head coach for Derthona Basket of the Italian LBA. De Raffaele has coached multiple teams in Italy since 2000.

== Coaching career ==
In June 2016, De Raffaele signed a contract as head coach of Umana Reyer Venezia. On May 2, 2018, De Raffaele won the FIBA Europe Cup with Reyer.
