= Michael Bramos =

Greek-American basketball player

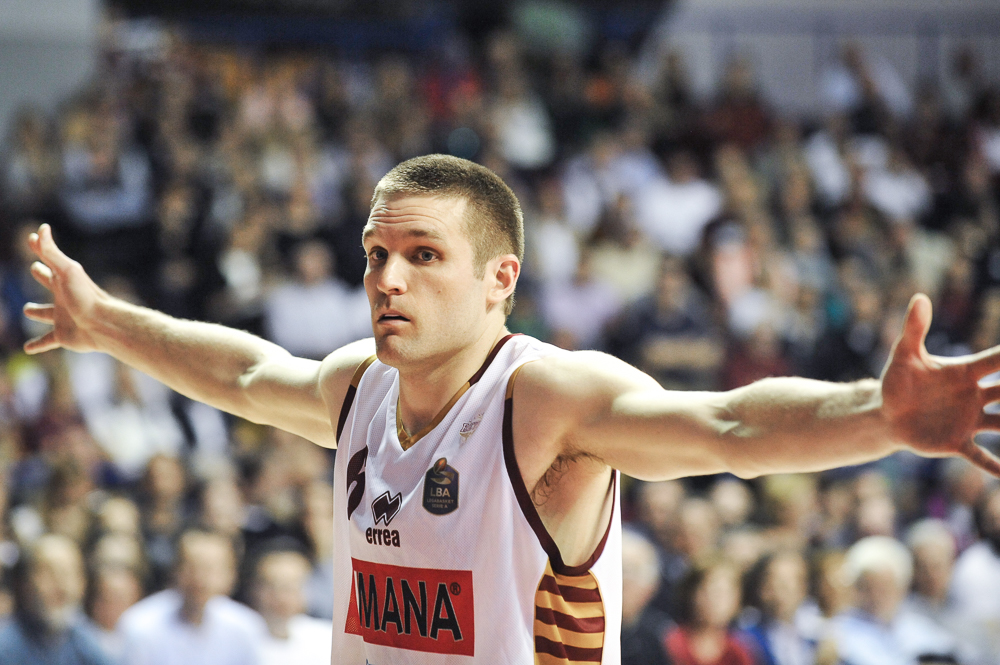
- Bramos with Reyer Venezia in 2017

Personal information
- Born: May 27, 1987 (age 39) Harper Woods, Michigan, U.S.
- Listed height: 1.98 m (6 ft 6 in)
- Listed weight: 102 kg (225 lb)

Career information
- High school: Grosse Pointe North (Grosse Pointe Woods, Michigan)
- College: Miami (Ohio) (2005–2009)
- NBA draft: 2009: undrafted
- Playing career: 2009–2023
- Position: Small forward / shooting guard
- Number: 6

Career history
- 2009–2010: Peristeri
- 2010–2012: Gran Canaria
- 2012–2014: Panathinaikos
- 2015–2023: Reyer Venezia

Career highlights
- FIBA Europe Cup champion (2018); 2× Greek League champion (2013, 2014); 2× Greek Cup winner (2013, 2014); 2× Greek League All-Star (2013, 2014); 2× Italian League champion (2017, 2019); MAC Player of the Year (2009); First-team All-MAC (2009); Second-team All-MAC (2008)

Michalis Antonis "Mike" Bramos (Greek: Μιχάλης "Μάικ" Αντώνης Μπράμος, commonly referred to as Michael Bramos), born 27 May 1987, is a Greek-American former professional basketball player. Born in Harper Woods, Michigan, he played college basketball for Miami University. In his senior season at Miami, Bramos was named MAC Player of the Year. He is a shooting guard-small forward, standing at 1.98 m (6 ft 6 in), with a 2.13 m (7 ft.) wingspan.

== High school career ==
Bramos attended Grosse Pointe North High School, in Grosse Pointe Woods, Michigan, where he played high school basketball.

== College career ==
After high school, Bramos played college basketball at Miami (Ohio) from 2005 to 2009. With the RedHawks, he was named to the All-Mid-American Conference Second Team in 2008, as a junior. As a senior, he was named to the 2009 All-Mid-American Conference First Team, and he was also named the 2009 Mid-American Conference Player of the Year. In his four seasons with Miami, Bramos appeared in 120 games, averaging 12.6 points, 3.7 rebounds, 1.6 assists, 1 steal, and 1.1 block per game. As of May 2015, Bramos was Miami's sixth all-time leader in points scored, with 1,515, third all-time in blocked shots, with 130, and tenth all-time in steals, with 124.

== Professional career ==
After not being selected in the 2009 NBA draft, Bramos played with the Detroit Pistons' NBA Summer League team in 2009. In August 2009, he joined the Greek Basket League club Peristeri. With Peristeri, he played in all 26 Greek League regular season games, averaging 8.9 points, 2.2 rebounds, and 1.2 assists per game, in 24 minutes of playing time. In 2010, he joined the Spanish ACB League club Gran Canaria.

In 2012, he signed a 3-year contract with Greek EuroLeague-playing club, Panathinaikos, with the first two years of the contract being guaranteed. With Panathinaikos, he won both the Greek Cup and the Greek League in 2013 and 2014. Panathinaikos declined to pick up the team option on the last year of his contract, and he was released by the club on 12 June 2014.

Bramos played with the Atlanta Hawks' NBA Summer League team in 2014, but he injured himself during Summer League play. He was thus sidelined for the entire 2014–15 season.

In August 2015, he was signed for the 2015–16 season by the Italian LBA side Umana Reyer Venezia, after the team had made sure he was fit to play again. On June 28, 2016, he re-signed with Venezia for one more season. In the 2016–17 season, he won the Italian League championship. On July 5, 2017, he signed a contract extension with Venezia, through the year 2019. In 2019, Bramos became the team's captain.

On June 1, 2023, Bramos and Venezia released a joint statement announcing his retirement from professional basketball, after eight seasons together.

== National team career ==
Bramos became a member of the senior men's Greek national basketball team in 2011. With Greece's national team, he played at EuroBasket 2011, the 2012 FIBA World Olympic Qualifying Tournament and at EuroBasket 2013.

== Personal life ==
Bramos' paternal grandfather was originally from Greece, coming from Kardamas, near Amaliada; he met some of his relatives when he played in Greece.

== Awards and accomplishments ==
=== College ===
- Second-Team All-MAC: (2008)
- First-Team All-MAC: (2009)
- MAC Player of the Year: (2009)

=== Professional career ===
- 2× Greek League Champion: (2013, 2014)
- 2× Greek Cup Winner: (2013, 2014)
- 2× Greek League All-Star: (2013, 2014)
- 2× Italian League champion: (2017, 2019)
