= Julyan Stone =

American basketball player (born 1988)

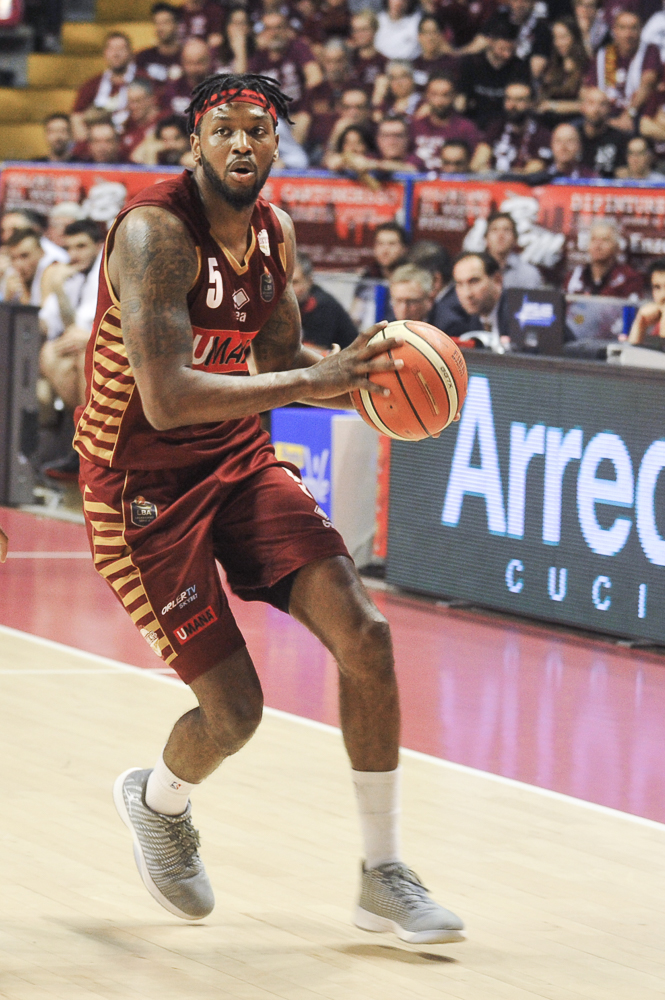
- Stone with Reyer Venezia in 2017

Personal information
- Born: December 7, 1988 (age 37) Alexandria, Virginia, U.S.
- Listed height: 6 ft 6 in (1.98 m)
- Listed weight: 209 lb (95 kg)

Career information
- High school: Dos Pueblos (Goleta, California)
- College: UTEP (2007–2011)
- NBA draft: 2011: undrafted
- Playing career: 2011–2024
- Position: Shooting guard / small forward
- Number: 10, 77, 2, 21, 32, 5, 00

Career history
- 2011–2013: Denver Nuggets
- 2012: →Idaho Stampede
- 2013: →Iowa Energy
- 2013–2014: Toronto Raptors
- 2014–2015: Reyer Venezia
- 2015–2016: Royal Halı Gaziantep
- 2016–2017: Fort Wayne Mad Ants
- 2017: Reyer Venezia
- 2017–2018: Charlotte Hornets
- 2018–2022: Reyer Venezia
- 2022–2023: Scafati Basket
- 2024: Marinos B.B.C.

Career highlights
- Italian League champion (2017); Second-team All-Conference USA (2011); 2× Conference USA All-Defensive Team (2010, 2011)
- Stats at NBA.com
- Stats at Basketball Reference

Julyan Ray Stone (born December 7, 1988) is an American former professional basketball player. He played college basketball for the University of Texas at El Paso.

== Early life ==
Stone was born on December 7, 1988, in Alexandria, Virginia to David and Janet Stone. He has three siblings; his brother J.T. played college football at West Texas A&M University, while his brother Jason played collegiately at San Diego State University. Stone attended Dos Pueblos High School in Goleta, California, where he was a member of the varsity basketball team for four seasons. As a senior, he averaged 17 points, 8.0 rebounds, 8.0 assists, and 5.7 steals. After the season, he was considered a top 200 recruit by HOOP Scoop Online heading into college.

== College career ==
Stone was rated as a two-star recruit by Rivals.com and was recruited by both the University of Texas at El Paso (UTEP) and the University of Portland. On May 4, 2007, he accepted the scholarship offer from UTEP. In his freshman season at UTEP, he averaged 2.8 points, 4.1 rebounds, 3.5 assists, and 1.6 steals, per game. He finished the season with 52 steals, second most on the team. He also finished with 114 assists and 50 turnovers, making his assist–to–turnover ratio 2.28, which was the best ratio for any freshman in all of college basketball that season.

As a sophomore, Stone finished the season with 5.6 points, 5.1 rebounds, and 1.4 steals per game. He also recorded 236 assists, which led the team and became the first player in UTEP Miners' history to record over 100 assists in both their freshman and sophomore seasons. Stone also became the leader in most double-figure assist games with six. During the post-season, he set a College Basketball Invitational record with 45 assists, recording eight against Nevada, 10 against Oregon State in the first game between the two teams and then nine in game two against Oregon State.

During his junior season at UTEP, Stone averaged 6.1 points, 5.1 rebounds, 5.5 assists, and 1.6 steals per game. Against Arkansas State University, he recorded ten points, seven rebounds, and eight assists, almost becoming the second player in UTEP history to record a triple-double. Against East Carolina, he recorded a season-high 11 assists. For the first time in his collegiate career, UTEP made it into the NCAA Tournament. In their only game of the tournament, Stone scored eight points, grabbed five rebounds, recorded seven assists, and stole the ball twice. The Miners wound up losing the game to the Butler Bulldogs, 77–59. Butler eventually made it all the way to the championship game against the Duke Blue Devils, only to lose 61–59. Following the season, he was named to the Conference USA All–Defensive team.

As a senior, Stone finished the season averaging 8.5 points, 7.5 rebounds, 5.3 assists, and 1.5 steals per game. In an article about the Legends Classic, a regular season tournament that UTEP participated in, Sports Illustrated writer Seth Davis commented that, "I also liked what I saw out of 6-7 senior point guard Julyan Stone, though I'm mystified as to why he has not developed more of an offensive game. If he did, he'd be a surefire pro."

On February 5, 2011, in a conference game against the Rice Owls, Stone recorded a career-high 23 points, making seven of his nine shots and nine out of ten free throws. After the game, Rice head coach Ben Braun said that his team, "let Stone get to the rim and he made big plays." In his final career game at UTEP, Stone recorded one assist, which brought his career total to 714, the most in UTEP and Conference USA history by a single player. He was later named to the Conference USA All-Defensive team for a second straight season, as well as the Conference USA All-Conference second team.

== Professional career ==
=== Denver Nuggets (2011–2013) ===
Stone went undrafted in the 2011 NBA draft. On December 9, 2011, Stone signed a two-year, $1.1 million contract with the Denver Nuggets. During training camp, Stone was quoted as saying, "You got to go out there and give it your all on every possession. You can't have any bad days."

On January 3, 2012, Stone was assigned to the Idaho Stampede of the NBA Development League. On January 10, 2012, he was recalled by the Nuggets.

On January 30, 2013, Stone was assigned to the Iowa Energy. On February 13, 2013, he was recalled by the Nuggets.

=== Toronto Raptors (2013–2014) ===
On September 19, 2013, Stone signed with the Toronto Raptors. On July 7, 2014, he was waived by the Raptors.

=== Umana Reyer Venezia (2014–2015) ===
On September 12, 2014, Stone signed with Umana Reyer Venezia of Italy for the 2014–15 season.

=== Royal Halı Gaziantep (2015–2016) ===
On September 25, 2015, Stone signed with the Oklahoma City Thunder, but was waived on October 22 after appearing in one preseason game. On October 27, Stone signed with Royal Halı Gaziantep of the Turkish Basketball Super League.

=== Fort Wayne Mad Ants (2016–2017) ===
On August 29, 2016, Stone signed with the Indiana Pacers. However, he was later waived by the Pacers on October 23 after appearing in five preseason games. On October 31, he was acquired by the Fort Wayne Mad Ants of the NBA Development League as an affiliate player of the Pacers.

=== Return to Venezia (2017) ===
On February 27, 2017, Stone signed with Umana Reyer Venezia, returning to the club for a second stint. On August 13, 2017, he parted ways with Venezia in order to return to the NBA.

=== Charlotte Hornets (2017–2018) ===
On August 23, 2017, Stone signed with the Charlotte Hornets.

On July 8, 2018, Stone was traded to the Chicago Bulls in a three-team deal. On July 14, he was waived by the Bulls.

=== Reyer Venezia (2018–2022) ===
On July 25, 2018, Stone came back to Italy and signed a two-year deal with Reyer Venezia for the 2018–19 season. He averaged 4.5 points, 5.5 rebounds and 3.1 assists per game in the 2019–20 season. On June 16, 2020, Stone re-signed with the team. He re-signed with Reyer Venezia on July 10, 2021.

=== Scafati Basket (2022–2023) ===
On July 7, 2022, he has signed with Scafati Basket of the Lega Basket Serie A.

=== Marinos B.B.C. (2024) ===
On March 21, 2024, Stone signed with Marinos B.B.C. of the Superliga Profesional de Baloncesto.

== NBA career statistics ==
Legend
GP	Games played	GS	Games started	MPG	Minutes per game
FG%	Field goal percentage	3P%	3-point field goal percentage	FT%	Free throw percentage
RPG	Rebounds per game	APG	Assists per game	SPG	Steals per game
BPG	Blocks per game	PPG	Points per game	**Bold**	Career high

=== Regular season ===
Year	Team	GP	GS	MPG	FG%	3P%	FT%	RPG	APG	SPG	BPG	PPG
2011–12	Denver	22	2	**8.1**	.419	.182	.727	1.1	**1.7**	**.4**	**.3**	1.6
2012–13	Denver	4	0	7.0	**1.000**	.000	**.750**	.8	.5	.3	.0	**1.8**
2013–14	Toronto	21	0	5.7	.412	.250	.667	1.0	.6	.1	.0	.9
2017–18	Charlotte	**23**	0	7.6	.462	**.462**	.500	**1.3**	1.1	.2	.1	.8
**Career**		70	2	7.2	.444	.313	.700	1.1	1.1	.2	.1	1.1

=== Playoffs ===
Year	Team	GP	GS	MPG	FG%	3P%	FT%	RPG	APG	SPG	BPG	PPG
2012	Denver	**2**	0	2.5	**.500**	.000	.000	**.5**	**1.0**	.0	.0	**1.0**
2013	Denver	**2**	0	**6.5**	.000	.000	**1.000**	.0	.5	.0	.0	**1.0**
**Career**		4	0	4.5	.500	.000	1.000	.3	.8	.0	.0	1.0
