= Mitchell Watt (basketball) =

American basketball player (born 1989)

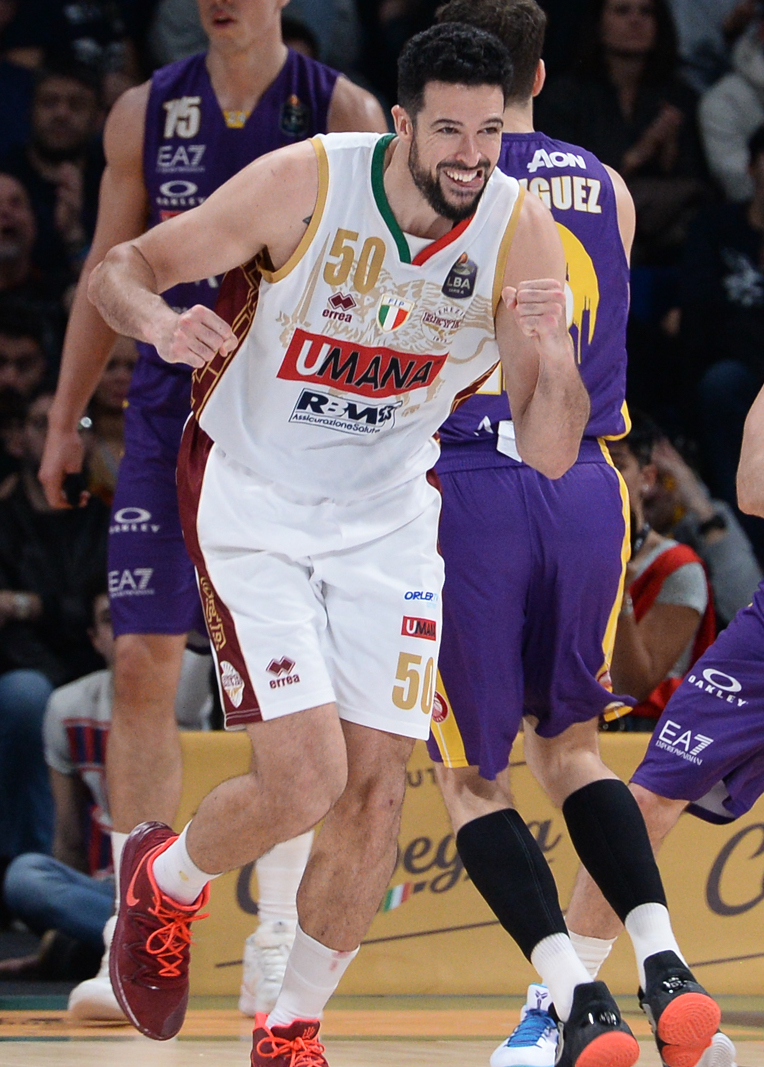

No. 50 – Toyama Grouses
- Position: Power forward / center
- League: B.League

Personal information
- Born: December 14, 1989 (age 36)
- Listed height: 6 ft 10 in (2.08 m)
- Listed weight: 225 lb (102 kg)

Career information
- High school: Desert Edge (Goodyear, Arizona)
- College: Buffalo (2008–2012)
- NBA draft: 2012: undrafted
- Playing career: 2012–present

Career history
- 2012–2013: Hapoel Gilboa Galil
- 2013–2014: Ironi Nes Ziona
- 2014: Santa Cruz Warriors
- 2014–2015: Ironi Nes Ziona
- 2015–2016: Alba Berlin
- 2016: Ironi Nes Ziona
- 2016–2017: Juvecaserta
- 2017: Al Ahli Dubai
- 2017–2023: Reyer Venezia
- 2023: Shaanxi Wolves
- 2023–2024: Casademont Zaragoza
- 2024–present: Toyama Grouses

Career highlights
- Lega Basket Serie A First Team (2020); All-Lega Basket Serie A Second Team (2019); Lega Basket Serie A All-Defensive First Team (2020); Italian Cup champion (2020); Lega Basket Serie A champion (2019); FIBA Europe Cup champion (2018); German Cup champion (2016); Balkan League champion (2013); Balkan League Import Player of the Year (2013); All-Balkan League First Team (2013); MAC Player of the Year (2012); First-team All-MAC (2012); AP Honorable Mention All-American (2012)
- Stats at Basketball Reference

Mitchell Watt (born December 14, 1989) is an American professional basketball player for Toyama Grouses of the B.League. He played college basketball for the University at Buffalo, where he was an All-American and Mid-American Conference (MAC) player of the year.

== College career ==
Watt, a 6'10" forward-center from Desert Edge High School in Goodyear, Arizona, came to Buffalo to play for coach Reggie Witherspoon. After cracking the starting lineup as a freshman in 2008–09, Watt established himself as one of the top defensive players in the MAC, earning the nickname sWatt. As a sophomore, Watt battled Guillain–Barré syndrome, which limited his effectiveness. His role was largely as a rebounder and defensive stopper his first three years. As a junior, he averaged 8.0 points, 5.3 rebounds and 2.2 blocked shots per game.

As a senior, Watt continued his strong defensive play, but also nearly doubled his scoring output. He averaged 16.3 points, 7.3 rebounds, 2.2 assists and 2.2 blocks per game. He led the Bulls to a 12–4 MAC record and was named conference player of the year and an AP honorable mention All-American. For his career, Watt scored 1,061 points (8.3 per game), 565 rebounds (4.4 per game) and 195 blocks (1.5 per game). At the end of his career, Watt was invited to play in the Reese's College All-Star Game at the 2012 Final Four.

== Professional career ==
=== 2012–13 season ===
In April 2012, Watt participated in the pre-NBA Draft Portsmouth Invitational Tournament, where he set the tournament record for blocked shots with 13.

After going undrafted in the 2012 NBA draft, Watt joined the Memphis Grizzlies for the 2012 NBA Summer League. On August 2, 2012, he signed a one-year deal with Hapoel Gilboa Galil of the Israeli Basketball Super League.

=== 2013–14 season ===
In July 2013, Watt joined the Los Angeles Lakers for the 2013 NBA Summer League. On August 18, 2013, he signed a one-year deal with Ironi Nes Ziona.

=== 2014–15 season ===
In July 2014, Watt joined the Golden State Warriors for the 2014 NBA Summer League. On September 2, 2014, he signed with the Warriors. However, he was later waived by the Warriors on October 24, 2014. On November 3, 2014, he was acquired by the Santa Cruz Warriors as an affiliate player. On December 22, 2014, he left Santa Cruz and signed with his former team Ironi Nes Ziona of Israel for the rest of the season.

=== 2015–16 season ===
On July 6, 2015, Watt was announced as a member of the Toronto Raptors roster for the 2015 NBA Summer League. On August 16, he signed with Alba Berlin of the Basketball Bundesliga. He parted ways with Berlin in March 2016.

=== 2016–17 season ===
In August 2016, Watt signed with JuveCaserta of the top Italian league, Serie A. Averaged 14.9 points, 9.0 rebounds was named team MVP.

=== 2017–18 season ===
In August 2017 signed a 2-year deal with Reyer Venezia. On 2 May 2018, Watt won the FIBA Europe Cup with Reyer Venezia. Averaged 11.5 points, 4.5 Rebounds. Finished 3rd place in Italian League.

=== 2018–19 season ===
In June 2019 won the Italian league championship with Reyer Venezia. Finalist for Italian league MVP. Averaged 15.3 points per game and 5.5 rebounds per game, Lead the league with 70.1 FG% named all Italian league second team. Has played in 126 straight games with Reyer Venezia. 2 Time round league MVP including a 27-point 9 rebound vs Avellino.

=== 2019–20 season ===
Won 2020 final eight Italian Cup with Reyer Venezia. Selected First Team all Final Eight Cup.Eurocup regular season round 6 MVP v Partizan NIS With 27 points 11/12 FG 37 value. Reyer made quarterfinals of Eurocup but was suspended indefinitely due to COVID-19. He averaged 12.9 points per game and 5.1 rpg With a value of 14.6 and named euro basket all eurocup honorable mention. In Italian Lega Basket he averaged 14.5 points per game 7.4 rebounds per game with 18.4 value. He was named Lega Basket Serie A First Team All Defensive Center and Lega Basket Serie A First Team center.

=== 2020–21 season ===
On June 22, 2020, Watt signed a multi-year contract extension with Reyer Venezia.

- Named Italian League MVP For January 2021

=== 2021–22 season ===
- Eurocup Honorable Mention 2022
- Sportando Second Team Serie A
- Italian League MVP For November 2021
- 31 games played watt ranked 10th with 14.7ppg, 6th with 7.1rpg second with 1.4bpg and 4th with 19.5 rating per game

=== 2022–23 season ===
- Eurocup MVP of Round 15 – 22 points, 5 rebounds, and 3 assists with a PIR of 34.
- eurobasket all Italian second team.
- surpassed 3000 points in Italian league.
- Left reyer after 2023 season, top 5 in club history for points (2581), rebounds(1019), blocks(188) and games played (321).

=== 2023–24 season ===
On September 25, 2023, Watt signed with Casademont Zaragoza of the Liga ACB.
