= 2017 Italian LNP Cup =

2017 Turkish Airlines Cup

Tournament details
- Arena: Unipol Arena; Bologna, Italy
- Dates: 3–5 March 2017

Final positions
- Champions: Segafredo Virtus Bologna; 1st title
- Runners-up: Angelico Biella

Awards and statistics
- MVP: (Italy) Marco Spissu

The 2017 Italian LNP Cup, knows as the Turkish Airlines Cup for sponsorship reasons, was the 19th edition of the tournament. The competition was organised by Lega Nazionale Pallacanestro (LNP) for Serie A2 clubs. The tournament was played from 3 to 5 March 2017 at the Unipol Arena in Bologna.

Givova Scafati were the defending champions.

Segafredo Virtus Bologna went to win his first LNP Cup by beating Angelico Biella 69–68 in the Finals. Marco Spissu was named Finals MVP of the competition.

== Qualification ==
Eight teams, four in each group (East and West) qualified for the Cup are the best ranked teams at the end of the first stage of 2016–17 Serie A2 season.

=== East Group ===
- 1. Segafredo Virtus Bologna
- 2. De' Longhi Treviso
- 3. Alma Trieste
- 4. Dinamica Mantova

=== West Group ===
- 1. Angelico Biella
- 2. TWS Legnano
- 3. UniCusano Roma
- 4. Moncada Agrigento

Source: LNP

== Bracket ==
Quarter-finals; 3 March 2017
1W	Angelico Biella	86
4E	Dinamica Generale Mantova	78
2E	De' Longhi Treviso	73
3W	UniCusano Roma	72
2W	TWS Legnano	55
3E	Alma Trieste	84
1E	Segafredo Virtus Bologna	95
4W	Moncada Agrigento	63

Semifinals; 4 March 2017
1W	Angelico Biella	89
2E	De' Longhi Treviso	81
3E	Alma Trieste	74
1E	Segafredo Virtus Bologna	86

Final; 5 March 2017
1W	Angelico Biella	68
1E	Segafredo Virtus Bologna	69

== Games ==
=== Quarterfinals ===
3 March 2017	Angelico Biella	86–78	Dinamica Generale Mantova	Bologna
13:15 (CEST)	Scoring by quarter: 19–24, 16–19, 31–17, 20–18
Sky Sport	Pts: Ferguson 29; Rebs: Hall 13; Asts: Ferguson, Venuto 2 PIR: Hall 26	Boxscore	Pts: Giachetti 25; Rebs: Amici 8 Asts: Corbett, Giachetti 4 PIR: Giachetti 28	Arena: Unipol Arena

3 March 2017	De' Longhi Treviso	73–72	UniCusano Roma	Bologna
15:30 (CEST)	Scoring by quarter: 19–12, 16–20, 21–23, 17–17
Sky Sport	Pts: Moretti 25; Rebs: Moretti, Rinaldi 7 Asts: Fantinelli 6 PIR: Moretti 26	Boxscore	Pts: Brown 26; Rebs: Landi 8 Asts: Sandri 6 PIR: Brown 35	Arena: Unipol Arena

3 March 2017	TWS Legnano	55–84	Alma Trieste	Bologna
18:30 (CEST)	Scoring by quarter: 10–24, 23–12, 13–20, 9–28
Sky Sport	Pts: Martini 16; Rebs: Mosley 10; Asts: Raivio 4 PIR: Mosley 20	Boxscore	Pts: Green 23; Rebs: Green, Parks 8 Asts: Da ros 8 PIR: Green 28	Arena: Unipol Arena

3 March 2017	Segafredo Virtus Bologna	95–63	Moncada Agrigento	Bologna
20:45 (CEST)	Scoring by quarter: 24–17, 16–17, 29–17, 26–12
Sky Sport	Pts: Spissu 25; Rebs: Bruttini 6 Asts: Spizzichini 7 PIR: Spissu 34	Boxscore	Pts: Buford 22; Rebs: Ferraro 6 Asts: Piazza 5 PIR: Buford 23	Arena: Unipol Arena

=== Semifinals ===
4 March 2017	Angelico Biella	89–81	De' Longhi Treviso	Bologna
18:30 (CEST)	Scoring by quarter: 24–17, 25–29, 19–18, 21–17
Sky Sport	Pts: Ferguson 30; Rebs: Hall 8 Asts: Ferguson 6 PIR: Ferguson 26	Boxscore	Pts: Perry 22; Rebs: Perry 7 Asts: Moretti 6 PIR: Perry 25	Arena: Unipol Arena

4 March 2017	Alma Trieste	74–86	Segafredo Virtus Bologna	Bologna
20:45 (CEST)	Scoring by quarter: 20–20, 27–26, 21–18, 6–22
Sky Sport	Pts: Green 37; Rebs: Green 7 Asts: Bossi, Da ros 3 PIR: Green 44	Boxscore	Pts: Lawson 26; Rebs: Rosselli 10; Asts: Umeh 9 PIR: Rosselli 27	Arena: Unipol Arena

=== Final ===
5 March 2017	Angelico Biella	68–69	Segafredo Virtus Bologna	Bologna
17:45 (CEST)	Scoring by quarter: 20–24, 15–11, 16–14, 17–20
Sky Sport	Pts: Hall 24; Rebs: Hall 19; Asts: Ferguson 5 PIR: Hall 42	Boxscore	Pts: Spissu 16; Rebs: Rosselli 12; Asts: Rosselli 5 PIR: Rosselli 26	Arena: Unipol Arena

== Sponsors ==
- Turkish Airlines (title sponsor)
- FXCM (main sponsor)
- Molten (official ball)
- Spalding
- Oiko
- Gruppo Italtelo
- Ennova Solution
- Caterpillar Inc.
- Sportsystem
- Aeroporto di Bologna
- ChartSide
- McDonald's
- LLoyds Farmacia
- OpenSky
- Roadhouse Grill

Source: LNP Cup
