= Bagnoli (disambiguation) =

Bagnoli is a western seaside quarter of Naples, Italy.

Bagnoli may also refer to:

== Places in Italy ==
- Bagnoli, Arcidosso, a hamlet of Arcidosso, in the Province of Grosseto
- Bagnoli della Rosandra, a hamlet of San Dorligo della Valle, in the Province of Trieste
- Bagnoli del Trigno, a municipality of the Province of Isernia
- Bagnoli di Sopra, a municipality of the Province of Padua
- Bagnoli Irpino, a municipality of the Province of Avellino

== People ==
- Al Bagnoli (born 1953), American football coach
- Antonio Bagnoli (1902–1997), Italian ordinary of the Catholic Church
- Daniele Bagnoli (1953–2024), Italian volleyball coach
- Giovanni Francesco Bagnoli (1678–1713), Italian painter
- Martina Bagnoli (born 1964), Italian art historian and curator
- Osvaldo Bagnoli (1935–2026), former Italian football coach
- Simone Bagnoli (born 1981), Italian professional basketball player
- Stefano Bagnoli, Italian jazz drummer

== See also ==
- Bagnolo (disambiguation)
