= 2024 European Artistic Gymnastics Championships =

The 2024 European Artistic Gymnastics Championships consisted of the following competitions held at Rimini Fiera in Rimini, Italy:

- 2024 European Men's Artistic Gymnastics Championships, held on 24–28 April 2024;
- 2024 European Women's Artistic Gymnastics Championships, held on 2–5 May 2024.
