= Italian LNP Cup =

Basketball competition

Turkish Airlines Cup
- Current season, competition or edition: 2017 Italian LNP Cup
- Sport: Basketball
- First season: 1998
- No. of teams: 4 (Serie A2), 4 (Serie B)
- Country: Italy
- Confederation: FIBA Europe
- Continent: (European Union) Europe
- Most recent champion: Pallacanestro Cantù (Serie A2)
- Most titles: Veroli Basket (3 titles)
- Broadcaster: Sportitalia
- Related competitions: Serie A2 Basket
- Website: LNP Cup official website

The Italian LNP Cup (Italian: Coppa Italia LNP), known as Old Wild West Cup for sponsorship reasons, is an annual cup competition for Italian basketball teams organized by Italy's second league in the Italian basketball league system, the Serie A2 Basket. The tournament is organised by the Lega Nazionale Pallacanestro (LNP), the organisation responsible for running the national second division Serie A2, third division Serie B, and fourth division Serie C championships.

A different cup is awarded for each of these respective divisions, though the event has been organised at the same date and place (under the name Rhythm'n'Basket Festival) from 2014, up to the current 2016 edition.

== Organisation ==
For the 2015 edition, the Serie A2 Final Six was composed of the four best ranked teams in Serie A2 Gold and the two best ranked teams in Serie A2 Silver at the end of the league first stage. The Serie B Final Four was preceded by a preliminary phase that saw the first-ranked teams of each league group (A, B, C, D) play against the second-ranked team of another group for a place in the cup. The Serie C Final Eight was also preceded by a prelimany phase, in which teams from different regions were pitted against each other for spots in the final phase.

The Rhythm'n'Basket (RnB) festival, organised since 2014 in association with Rimini Fiera, sees the games take place in the Rimini Expo Centre halls, one of which is converted for the occasion into two basketball courts (named Parigi 1999 and Atene 2004 in reference to the titles of the Italian national team) complete with two stands for a capacity of 5,000.

The 2017 edition, sees the games take place in Unipol Arena in Bologna for a record capacity of 9,513. Since 2017 Turkish Airlines become new title sponsor of the tournament for Serie A2 and Serie B.

== Serie A2 Cup champions (2nd-tier level) ==
Edition	Venue	Champion	Score	Finalist	MVP	Best Under-22 (Note: Formerly Best Italian (2008–2012) then Best Under-24 (2013) then Best Under-21 (2021–23) then Player Revelation (2024–))
2005	PalaDozza, Bologna	Upea Capo d'Orlando	94-83	Eurorida Scafati	(United States) Rolando Howell	—
2006	PalaSegest, Ferrara	Eurorida Scafati	90-81	Zarotti Imola	(United States) B.J. McKie	—
2007	PalaSojourner, Rieti	Sebastiani Rieti	71-61	Carife Ferrara	(United States) Marcus Melvin	—
2008	PalaSegest, Ferrara	Fileni Jesi	72-62	Carife Ferrara	(United States) Harold Jamison	(Italy) Marco Allegretti
2009	PalaSomenzi, Cremona	Prima Veroli	79-68	Vanoli Soresina	(United States) Kyle Hines	(Italy) Silvio Gigena
2010	PalaSerradimigni, Sassari	Prima Veroli	68-58	Enel Brindisi	(United States) Jason Rowe	(Italy) Ivan Gatto
2011	Sporting Palace, Novara	Prima Veroli	81-67	Aget Imola	(United States) Jarrius Jackson	(Italy) Davide Bruttini
2012	Palaflorio, Bari	Enel Brindisi	77-74	Fileni BPA Jesi	(United States) Jimmie Hunter	(Italy) Marco Giuri
2013	PalaTrento, Trento	Bitumcalor Trento	84-76	Giorgio Tesi Group Pistoia	(Italy) Davide Pascolo	
2014	Padiglioni Fiera Rimini, Rimini	Eurotrend Biella	100-94	Aquila Basket Trento	(United States) Damian Hollis	(Italy) Matteo Bertolazzi (Italy) Eric Lombardi
2015	Padiglioni Fiera Rimini, Rimini	Tezenis Verona	91-86	FMC Ferentino	(Nigeria) Michael Umeh	(Italy) Giovanni Allodi
2016	Padiglioni Fiera Rimini, Rimini	Givova Scafati	72-62	Dinamica Mantova	(Italy) Marco Portannese	(Italy) Davide Alviti
2017	Unipol Arena, Bologna	Segafredo Virtus Bologna	69-68	Angelico Biella	(Italy) Marco Spissu	
2018	UBI BPA Sport Center, Jesi	Bertram Tortona	89-57	OraSì Ravenna	(Italy) Francesco Stefanelli	
2019	Palasavelli, Porto San Giorgio	De' Longhi Treviso	84-75	Lavoropiù Fortitudo Bologna	(Poland) David Logan	
2020	Suspended due to COVID-19 pandemic in Europe					
2021	Palasport Cervia, Cervia	GeVi Napoli	80–69	ADP Old Wild West Udine	(United States) Josh Mayo	(Italy) Lodovico Deangeli
2022	PalaMaggetti, Roseto degli Abruzzi	ADP Old Wild West Udine	74–55	S.Bernardo Cantù	(United States) Trevor Lacey	(Italy) Nicola Giovannelli
2023	PalaPiantanida, Busto Arsizio	Guerino Vanoli Cremona	65–60	Tramec Cento	(Italy) Matteo Piccoli	(Estonia) Gregor Kuuba
2024	Palazzetto dello Sport, Roma	Unieuro Pallacanestro 2.015 Forlì	61–51	Flats Service Fortitudo Bologna	(Italy) Federico Zampini	(Montenegro) Todor Radonjić
2025	PalaDozza, Bologna	Acqua S.Bernardo Cantù	74–57	UEB Cividale	(United States) Tyrus McGee	(Italy) Giacomo Dell'Agnello

== Serie B Cup champions (3rd-tier level) ==
Edition	Venue	Champion	Score	Finalist	MVP
2014	Padiglioni Fiera Rimini, Rimini	Benacquista Latina	71-69	I.Dek Legnano	(Italy) Manuel Carrizo
2015	Padiglioni Fiera Rimini, Rimini	Contadi Castaldi Montichiari	94-83	BCC Convergenze Agropoli	(Italy) Riccardo Perego
2016	Padiglioni Fiera Rimini, Rimini	Unieuro Forlì	78-64	Eurobasket Roma	(Italy) Michele Ferri
2017	Unipol Arena, Bologna	Cuore Napoli Basket	60-58	Agribertocchi Orzinuovi	(Serbia) Stefan Nikolić
2018	UBI BPA Sport Center, Jesi	Fulgor Omegna	55-51	Benedetto XIV Cento	(Italy) Alex Simoncelli
2019	Palasavelli, Porto San Giorgio	Fulgor Omegna	82-71	Tigers Cesena	(Italy) Alessandro Grande
2020	Suspended due to COVID-19 pandemic in Europe				
2021	Palasport Cervia, Cervia	Bakery Piacenza	69-66	RSR Sebastiani Rieti	(Italy) Sebastian Vico
2022	PalaMaggetti, Roseto degli Abruzzi	Pallacanestro Roseto	69-65	UEB Cividale	(Italy) Edoardo Di Emidio
2023	PalaPiantanida, Busto Arsizio	Orzi Basket	66-45	RSR Sebastiani Rieti	(Italy) Emanuele Trapani
2024	Palazzetto dello Sport, Roma	Herons Montecatini	74-62	Libertas Livorno 1947	(Italy) Josè Alberto Benites
2025	PalaDozza, Bologna	Pallacanestro Montecatini	71-64	Pallacanestro Roseto	(Italy) Daniele Toscano

== Serie C Cup champions (4th-tier level) ==
Edition	Venue	Champion	Score	Finalist	MVP
2014	Padiglioni Fiera Rimini, Rimini	A.S.D. Luiss	71-69	Globo Allianz ASD Campli Basket	(Italy) Fabrizio Smorto
2015	Padiglioni Fiera Rimini, Rimini	Basket Scauri	69-67	Allianz San Severo	(Italy) Simone Bagnoli
2015	Padiglioni Fiera Rimini, Rimini	Vis Nova Roma	62-49	Tarcento	(Italy) Tommaso Rossetti

== Sponsorship names ==
Throughout the years, due to sponsorship, the competition has been known as:

- Adecco Cup (2014)
- IG Basket Cup (2015–2016)
- Turkish Airlines Cup (2017)
- Old Wild West Cup (2018–present)

== See also ==
- Italian Basketball Cup - The Cup for first division Serie A sides
- Serie A2 Basket - Also organised by the LNP
- Serie B Basket - Also organised by the LNP
