= Kyle Hines =

American professional basketball player (born 1986)

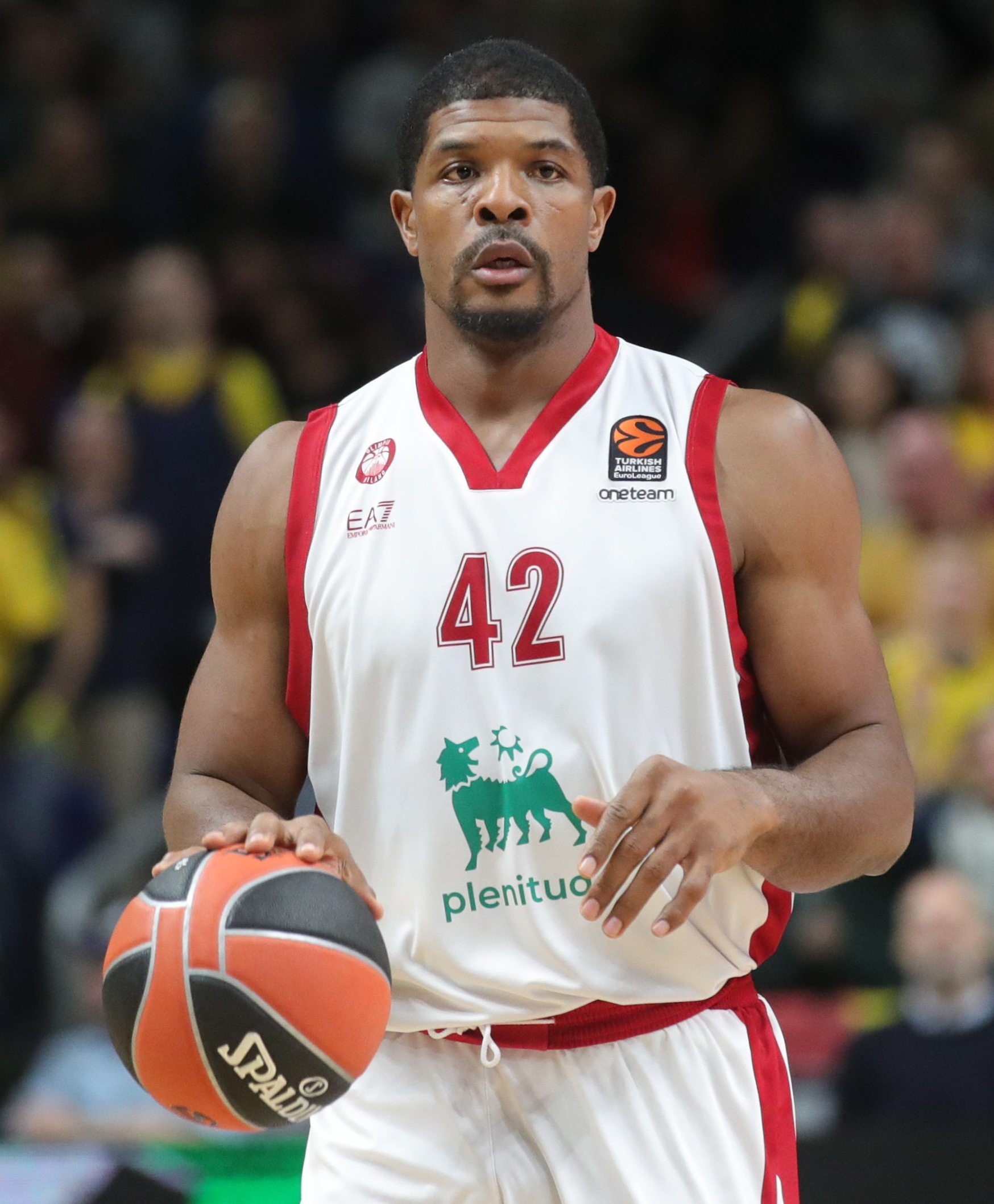
- Hines with Olimpia Milano in 2023

Long Island Nets
- Title: Assistant general manager
- League: NBA

Personal information
- Born: September 2, 1986 (age 40) Sicklerville, New Jersey, U.S.
- Listed height: 6 ft 6 in (1.98 m)
- Listed weight: 254 lb (115 kg)

Career information
- High school: Camden Catholic (Cherry Hill, New Jersey); Timber Creek (Erial, New Jersey)
- College: UNC Greensboro (2004–2008)
- NBA draft: 2008: undrafted
- Playing career: 2008–2024
- Position: Center / power forward
- Number: 42, 4, 20

Career history

Playing
- 2008–2010: Veroli
- 2010–2011: Brose Bamberg
- 2011–2013: Olympiacos
- 2013–2020: CSKA Moscow
- 2020–2024: Olimpia Milano

Coaching
- 2024–2025: Brooklyn Nets (player development assistant)

Career highlights
- 4× EuroLeague champion (2012, 2013, 2016, 2019); EuroLeague 2010–20 All-Decade Team (2020); 3× EuroLeague Best Defender (2016, 2018, 2022); EuroLeague 25th Anniversary Team (2025); 6× VTB United League champion (2014–2019); 3× Lega Serie A champion (2022, 2023, 2024); Greek League champion (2012); Bundesliga champion (2011); German Cup winner (2011); 2× Italian Cup winner (2021, 2022); German Supercup winner (2010); Italian Super Cup winner (2020); 2× Italian Second Division Cup winner (2009, 2010); Bundesliga Finals MVP (2011); VTB United League Hall of Fame (2021); All-VTB United League First Team (2018); VTB United League Defensive Player of the Year (2016); 2× Lega Serie A Defensive Player of the Year (2021, 2022); German All-Star Game MVP (2011); Italian Second Division Cup MVP (2009); SoCon Player of the Year (2007); 3× First-team All-SoCon (2006–2008); No. 42 retired by UNC Greensboro Spartans

Kyle Terrel Hines (born September 2, 1986) is an American former professional basketball player. He played at the power forward and center positions. Hines played college basketball with the UNC Greensboro Spartans of the University of North Carolina at Greensboro. With Olympiacos Piraeus, he won two EuroLeague championships (2012 and 2013), before winning another two with CSKA Moscow (2016 and 2019). Hines also won the EuroLeague Best Defender award three times, in 2016, 2018 and 2022. In addition, he was named to the EuroLeague 2010–20 All-Decade Team.

== High school career ==
Hines attended ninth grade at Camden Catholic High School, where he played on the freshman team before transferring to Timber Creek Regional High School to play for the Chargers as a sophomore. Timber Creek first opened after Hines' freshman year ended. After his relocation to the new school, he became a three-year varsity starter under head coach Gary Saunders. Hines averaged 15.3 points per game his sophomore season. As a junior he averaged 20.6 points and was voted a First Team All-South Jersey player, named MVP of the Philly USA All-Star Classic, and received a Top-20 All-Star status at Five Star Camp.

Hines repeated as a First Team All-South Jersey selection in his senior year of high school, and additionally garnered a Second Team All-State selection. He averaged 23.5 points per game, and became his high school's all-time leading scorer, finishing his career with 1,562 total points scored (his brother Tyler is also a 1,000-point career scorer at Timber Creek). Other accolades received during his senior season include; NJ Hoops First-Team All-Camden County, NJ Hoops Awards Rebounder Team, Best Post Player Team, Second-Team Top Dunkers, Best Rebounder and Top 20 All-Star at the summer Five Star Camp. Hines was rated top 15 seniors in the Delaware Valley.

== College career ==
=== Freshman season (2004–2005) ===
Hines started all 30 games and posted 13.6 points per game, a team-leading 8.6 rebounds per game, and shot a Southern Conference-leading 62.1 percentage the field (which also ranked seventh nationally). The first two games of Hines' collegiate career were double-doubles. Hines averaged a 3.5 blocks per game average (ranking fourth nationally). In the game against Georgia Southern on February 8, 2005, he set a Fleming Gymnasium record when he grabbed 18 rebounds. Hines was selected the Southern Conference's Player of the Month for January, as well as the SoCon Freshman of the Year. At the season's conclusion, he was selected to the All-Conference Team.

By the end of his first season, Hines had set several school records. His 259 rebounds and 175 field goals set new UNCG freshman records. He scored 408 points, which fell five short of the freshman record set by Jay Joseph.

=== Sophomore season (2005–2006) ===
Starting 30 of UNCG's 31 games (did not play the season-opener against UW-Green Bay), Hines led the team in scoring (19.3 points per game), rebounding (8.2 rebounds per game) and blocks (2.8 blocks per game). His scoring average and point total were the most in the Spartans' Division I-era history, and most ever by a sophomore. Showing his versatility, he ranked in the SoCon's Top 10 in steals (51; seventh) and minutes per game (34.0; fifth).

Hines recorded a school record 12 double-doubles during the 2005–06 campaign. His most impressive single-game performance came on December 31 against the #1 team in the nation, Duke, when he scored 20 points and grabbed five rebounds in the loss. Hines drew praise from legendary Duke Blue Devils head coach Mike Krzyzewski for his performance.

On December 3, Hines set a school sophomore record when he recorded 21 rebounds against the College of Charleston. Hines was named to the USBWA All-District Team and All-Southern Conference First Team.

=== Junior season (2006–2007) ===
After finishing as the runner-up for the Southern Conference Player of the Year award in his first two seasons, Hines won the award during his junior year campaign. Additionally, he became the first player in UNCG history to win the award.

In the 2006–07 season, Hines was one of only five players in all of men's college basketball to average 20+ points and 9+ rebounds per game. On November 11, 2006, he set a career-high of 38 points against Marshall, in an 82–80 overtime loss. His 605 total points scored set a new UNCG junior season record (second all-time). Another solid performance came against Duke. Hines scored 17 points and recorded 8 rebounds, both team-highs.

At the conclusion of the season, Hines had recorded at least one blocked shot in 83 out of his 89 career games played. His school record streak of 37 consecutive games with a block, started on February 19, 2005, was ended during an early season game against Penn State, on November 13, 2006.

=== Senior season (2007–2008) ===
In his senior college season, Hines averaged 19.2 points per game, and a career-high 9.1 rebounds per game.

== Professional career ==
=== NBA Summer League ===
After going undrafted in 2008, Hines was picked up by the Charlotte Bobcats to play at the NBA Summer League in Las Vegas and was later offered an NBA D league opportunity but he turned it down. In 2009, he was invited back to the Summer League and played on the Orlando Magic summer team. In 2010, he was invited again and played for the New Orleans Pelicans, but ultimately fell short of being offered an NBA contract.

=== Veroli Basket (2008–2010) ===
After not being selected in the 2008 NBA draft, Hines signed with Veroli Basket in Italy, where he played two seasons in the Italian second division, LegaDue Basket. With Veroli, he won 2 Italian Second Division Cups, in 2009 and 2010, and he was named the MVP of the Italian Second Division Cup in 2009.

=== Brose Bamberg (2010–2011) ===
In August 2010, Hines signed a one-year contract with the German Bundesliga club Brose Bamberg. With Bamberg, he won the German Supercup, BBL-Pokal, and the German League championship. Hines was awarded the Bundesliga Finals MVP in 2011. He was also named the MVP of the BBL All-Star Game that same season.

=== Olympiacos (2011–2013) ===
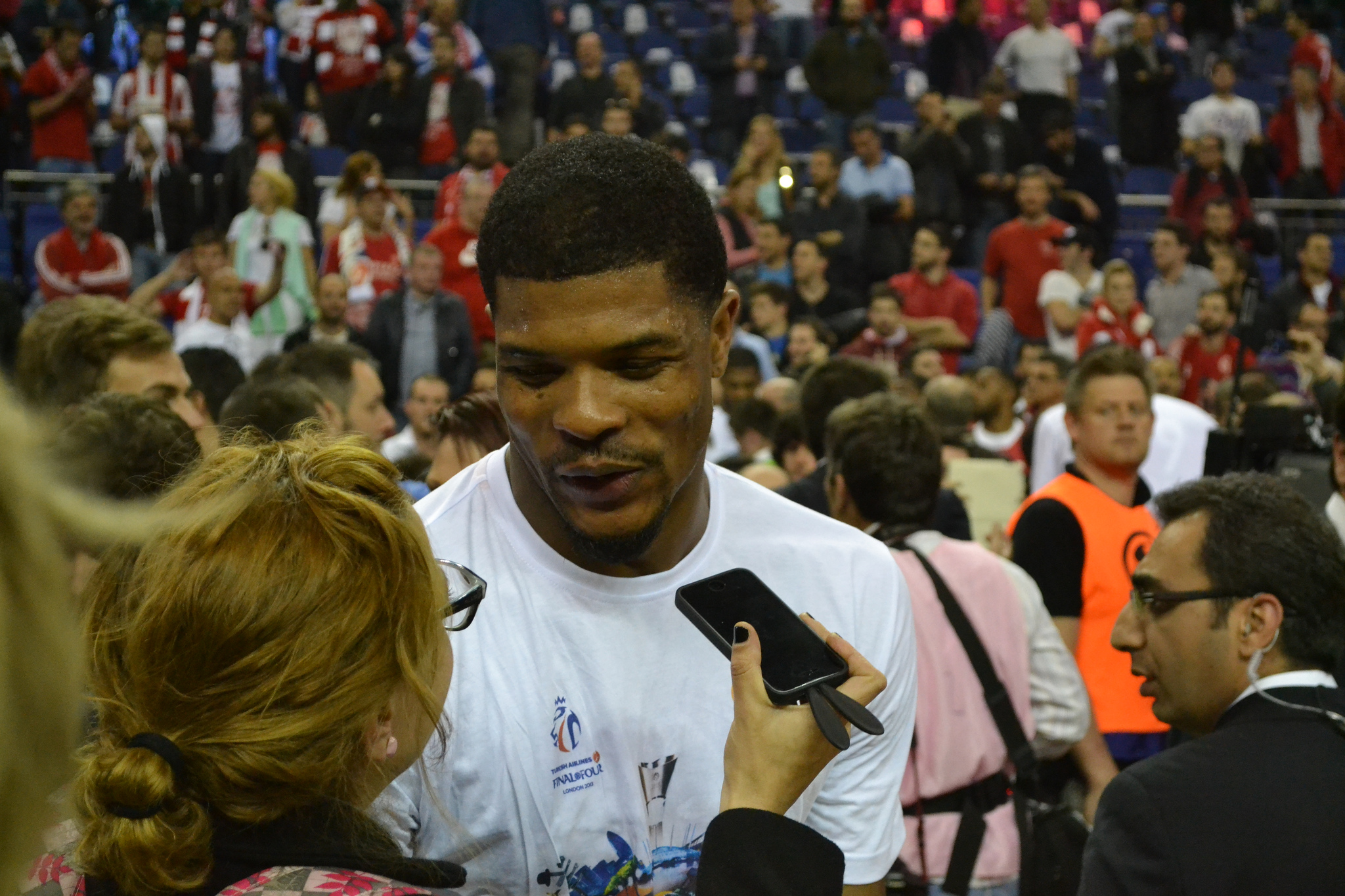
Hines at the EuroLeague Final in 2013.

In July 2011, Hines signed with Olympiacos Piraeus of the Greek Basket League. With Olympiacos, he won the EuroLeague championship at both the 2012 EuroLeague Final Four and the 2013 EuroLeague Final Four, and the Greek League championship in 2012. He contributed substantially to his team in all competitions, with both scoring and defensive skills. He made notable appearances at the top level of the European game, considering his rather low height for a center-forward. On June 24, 2013, Hines opted out of his contract with Olympiacos.

=== CSKA Moscow (2013–2020) ===
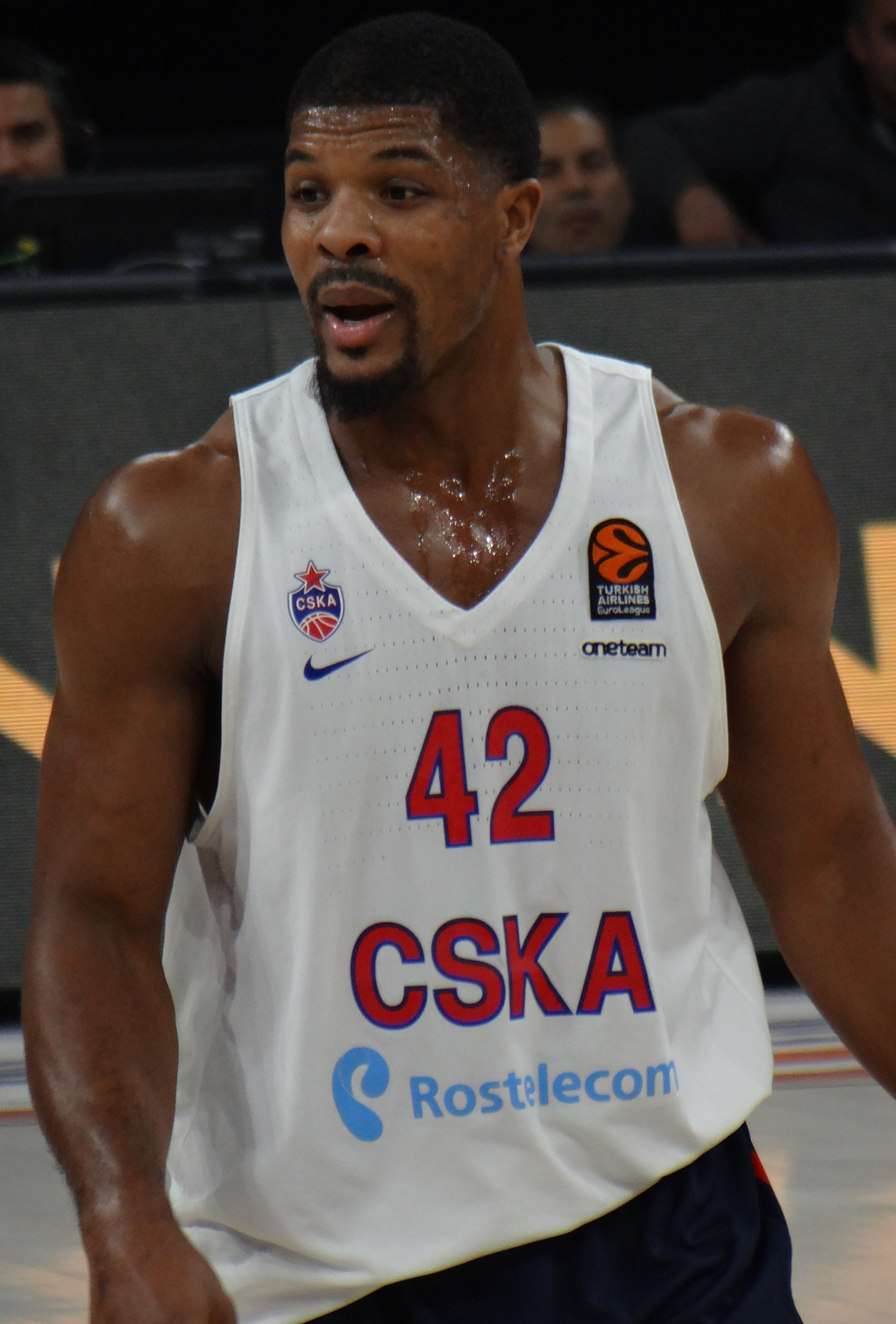
Hines with CSKA Moscow, in 2017.

On June 28, 2013, Hines signed two-year deal with the Russian powerhouse CSKA Moscow. In the 2014–15 season, CSKA Moscow managed to advance to the EuroLeague Final Four for the fourth straight season, after eliminating Panathinaikos Athens for the second straight season in their EuroLeague quarterfinal series, with a 3–1 series win.

However, in their EuroLeague semifinals game, despite being dubbed by the media as an absolute favorite to advance, CSKA once again lost to Olympiacos Piraeus. The final score was 70–68, after a great Olympiacos comeback in the 4th quarter, which was led by Vassilis Spanoulis. CSKA Moscow eventually won the EuroLeague third place game, after defeating Fenerbahçe, by a score of 86–80. In his second EuroLeague season with CSKA Moscow, Hines averaged EuroLeague career-lows up until that point, of 6.8 points and 4.3 rebounds per game, over 30 games played. CSKA Moscow finished the season by winning the VTB United League, after eliminating Khimki Moscow region with a 3–0 series sweep in the league's finals series.

On June 17, 2015, Hines signed a two-year contract extension with CSKA Moscow. With CSKA Moscow, Hines won the EuroLeague championship at the 2016 EuroLeague Final Four. In the summer of 2017, Hines competed in The Basketball Tournament on ESPN, for the number one seeded FCM Untouchables. While competing for the $2 million grand prize, he averaged 10.7 points, 11.0 rebounds, and 3.7 assists per game. Hines, whose 11.0 rebounds per game ranked second among all competing players, was one of only two players to average a double-double throughout the tournament. The Untouchables advanced to the Super 16 Round, where they were defeated by a score of 85–71 by Team FOE, a Philadelphia based team that was coached by the NBA brothers duo Markieff and Marcus Morris. Hines finished the game with 12 points and a game-high 10 rebounds.

On June 16, 2017, Hines signed a new two-year contract with CSKA Moscow. In May 2018, he was named the EuroLeague Best Defender for the 2017–18 season. Hines also won the EuroLeague championship with CSKA Moscow, at the 2019 EuroLeague Final Four.

=== Olimpia Milano (2020–2024) ===
In May 2020, Hines signed a two-year contract with the Italian League club Olimpia Milano, after spending the previous 7 seasons with the Russian VTB United League club CSKA Moscow. On July 6, 2023, he renewed his contract for another year.

On June 27, 2024, Kyle Hines announced his retirement from professional basketball via his personal Instagram account.

== Post-playing career ==
Following his retirement from professional basketball in 2024, Kyle Hines transitioned into coaching, joining the Brooklyn Nets as a player development assistant. His hiring was first reported by his long-time agent, Misko Raznatovic, on Instagram.

Prior to the start of the 2025-26 NBA Season. The NBA G League affiliate Long Island Nets announced that Hines moved from his assistant coach role with the Brooklyn Nets to the Nets’ G League affiliate and will serve as assistant general manager.

== Career statistics ==
Legend
GP	Games played	GS	Games started	MPG	Minutes per game
FG%	Field-goal percentage	3P%	3-point field-goal percentage	FT%	Free-throw percentage
RPG	Rebounds per game	APG	Assists per game	SPG	Steals per game
BPG	Blocks per game	PPG	Points per game	PIR	Performance index rating
**Bold**	Career high

=== EuroLeague ===
†	Denotes season in which Hines won the EuroLeague
*	Led the league

Year	Team	GP	GS	MPG	FG%	3P%	FT%	RPG	APG	SPG	BPG	PPG	PIR
2010–11	Bamberg	10	0	23.6	.643	.000	.467	5.4	.5	.8	1.1	**12.9**	12.5
2011–12†	Olympiacos	22	1	19.6	.519	.000	.576	4.5	1.0	.4	1.1	9.9	9.7
2012–13†	Olympiacos	31*	0	20.2	.599	.000	.587	**6.0**	1.2	.7	**1.2**	9.4	12.7
2013–14	CSKA Moscow	29	12	19.7	.632	.000	.684	4.5	1.1	.9	.8	7.6	11.5
2014–15	CSKA Moscow	30*	0	17.5	.612	.000	.682	4.3	.5	.6	.8	6.8	9.4
2015–16†	CSKA Moscow	29	16	**26.3**	**.674***	.000	.658	4.7	1.0	.6	.8	10.9	**13.6**
2016–17	CSKA Moscow	35	23	20.3	.650	.000	.702	4.3	.6	.7	.5	8.5	10.1
2017–18	CSKA Moscow	31	26	21.8	.605	.000	**.787**	4.4	1.2	**1.1**	.8	8.4	12.1
2018–19†	CSKA Moscow	36	5	19.5	.580	.000	.631	3.6	1.4	.7	.7	7.3	8.4
2019–20	CSKA Moscow	28*	**27**	23.4	.630	.333	.649	4.9	1.4	.6	.9	8.8	11.4
2020–21	Olimpia Milano	**40**	17	24.2	.552	.000	.652	4.4	**2.0**	.8	.8	7.7	10.0
2021–22	Olimpia Milano	36	21	23.5	.627	**1.000**	.658	5.3	1.8	.7	.7	8.0	11.8
2022–23	Olimpia Milano	34	10	18.5	.635	.000	.684	3.6	1.5	.6	.6	5.5	7.7
2023–24	Olimpia Milano	34	2	12.3	.551	.000	.675	2.3	.8	.4	.4	3.3	3.5
Career		425	160	20.7	.606	.154	.652	4.4	1.2	.7	.8	7.9	10.1

=== Domestic leagues ===
Year	Team	League	GP	MPG	FG%	3P%	FT%	RPG	APG	SPG	BPG	PPG
2008–09	(Italy) Veroli	LegaDue	34	31.9	.646	.000	.585	8.6	.9	2.9	1.8	16.9
2009–10	(Italy) Veroli	LegaDue	40	30.7	.625	.188	.578	8.1	.9	3.5	1.7	23.1
2010–11	(Germany) Bamberg	BBL	46	20.1	.608	.333	.524	4.6	.9	.7	1.2	10.4
2011–12	(Greece) Olympiacos	HEBA A1	34	18.5	.571	.000	.644	3.7	1.0	1.0	1.0	8.6
2012–13	(Greece) Olympiacos	HEBA A1	33	17.0	.635	—	.608	4.8	.7	.8	.7	7.5
2013–14	(Russia) CSKA Moscow	VTBUL	26	16.6	.566	.000	.611	3.1	.8	.5	.6	4.9
2014–15	(Russia) CSKA Moscow	VTBUL	39	15.6	.648	—	.606	3.9	.6	.5	.6	6.7
2015–16	(Russia) CSKA Moscow	VTBUL	39	15.6	.648	—	.606	3.9	.6	.5	.6	6.7
2016–17	(Russia) CSKA Moscow	VTBUL	32	18.3	.699	—	.629	3.4	1.3	.8	.6	7.7
2017–18	(Russia) CSKA Moscow	VTBUL	21	20.2	.709	.000	.765	4.6	1.2	.9	.4	9.3
2018–19	(Russia) CSKA Moscow	VTBUL	22	20.4	.606	.500	.690	3.4	1.5	.7	1.0	7.4
2019–20	(Russia) CSKA Moscow	VTBUL	16	18.1	.684	—	.680	4.4	1.6	.6	.5	5.9
2020–21	(Italy) Olimpia Milano	LBA	23	22.0	.576	.000	.738	5.5	1.7	1.3	.7	7.6
2021–22	(Italy) Olimpia Milano	LBA	24	23.0	.592	—	.571	4.8	2.5	.9	1.1	7.0
2022–23	(Italy) Olimpia Milano	LBA	28	17.7	.649	.000	.611	3.4	1.6	.8	.4	5.5
2023–24	(Italy) Olimpia Milano	LBA	29	16.9	.753	1.000	.692	3.7	1.0	.2	.5	5.2

=== College ===
Year	Team	GP	GS	MPG	FG%	3P%	FT%	RPG	APG	SPG	BPG	PPG
2004–05	UNC Greensboro	30	**30**	33.3	.621	.000	.537	8.6	.8	1.3	**3.5**	13.6
2005–06	UNC Greensboro	30	**30**	**34.0**	**.622**	**.182**	.551	8.2	**1.9**	1.7	2.8	19.3
2006–07	UNC Greensboro	29	28	32.0	.555	.167	.600	9.0	.9	1.4	2.2	**20.9**
2007–08	UNC Greensboro	**31**	**30**	32.3	.556	.125	**.628**	**9.1**	1.4	**1.8**	3.1	19.2
Career		120	118	32.9	.584	.153	.586	8.7	1.2	1.5	2.9	18.2

== Personal life ==
Born in Sicklerville, New Jersey, to Deidre Ledgister and Reggie Hines, Kyle spent his childhood growing up in South Jersey, outside of Philadelphia. Hines' father, Reggie, was a part of several different NFL training camps. He also has two younger siblings, one brother and one sister. His brother, Tyler, is also a professional basketball player.

Kyle and his wife, Gianna Smith, married in July 2015. Hines resides in New Jersey with his wife and their kids, Anya, Justin and Cassius.

=== Philanthropy ===
In 2011, Kyle co-founded the Team Hines 42 Foundation, which promotes and provides programs for youth athletes.

== Awards and accomplishments ==
=== College career ===
Note: All college records and awards were at the time of his college graduation, in May 2008. Since then, some of the records may have been broken. (Compiled from the following sources:)

Awards

- UNC Greensboro Spartans Athletics Hall of Fame (2025)
- Southern Conference Player of the Year (2007)
- Southern Conference Rookie of the Year (2005)
- 3× First-team All-SoCon (2006–2008)
- All-Freshman Team SoCon (2005)
- AP Honorable mention All-American (2007)
- Southern Conference Player of the Week (twice): (January 23, 2007, February 25, 2008)
- Southern Conference Player of the Month (four times): (January 2005, January 2006, December 2006, January 2007)
- Named Dick Vitale's "Diaper Dandy of the Week", at one point during freshman season (2005)
- USBWA All-District Selection three consecutive times (2006–2008)
- Named to three Mid-Major All-American squads (2007): (CNN SI, CollegeInsider.com, CollegeHoops.net)
- Featured in the October issue of Basketball Times Magazine, as one of five "Under the Radar" players nationally (2007)
- First UNCG player to have his/her jersey number retired while still active (#42) (2008)

Career highs

- 43 minutes played versus East Tennessee State (OT), on January 18, 2005
- 38 points versus Marshall University (OT), on November 11, 2006
- 21 rebounds versus College of Charleston, on December 3, 2005
- 6 assists versus Montreat College, on January 11, 2006
- 5 steals, in six games
- 7 blocks, in four games

Records

- First UNCG player to start career with back-to-back double-doubles (2005)
- Tied UNCG single game blocked shots (7) (four times)
- UNCG single game rebounds (21) (2005)
- Fleming Gymnasium rebounds record (18) (2005)
- UNCG freshman season rebounds (259) (2005)
- UNCG freshman field goals made (175) (2005)
- UNCG sophomore single season points (578) (2006)
- UNCG junior single season points (605) (2007)
- UNCG senior single season points (596) (2008)
- UNCG single season double-doubles (12) (2006)
- UNCG single season 30+ point games (5) (2007)
- UNCG single season free throw makes
- UNCG single season free throw attempts (Div-I era) (230) (2007)
- First player in school history to record back to back 500-point seasons (2006–2007)

First player to then achieve it three straight times (2006–2008)

- First UNCG duo (along with Ricky Hickman) to both score 500 points in a single season (2007)
- First player in school history to record three straight 400-point seasons (2005–2007)

First player to then achieve it four straight times (2005–2008)

- UNCG consecutive games with at least one block (37) (2005–2006)
- UNCG all-time leading scorer (2,187)
- UNCG all-time leading rebounder (1,047)
- Only UNCG player to join the 2000 / 1000 club
- NCAA DI – one of only six players to ever record 2,000 points, 1,000 rebounds, and 300 blocks in a career
- Southern Conference all-time leading shot blocker (349)
- Southern Conference single season blocked shots (106) (2005)
- Southern Conference leader in blocks for four consecutive seasons (2005–2008)
- Southern Conference consecutive double-digit scoring games (81) (2005–2008)

=== Professional career ===
- 2× Italian Second Division Cup Winner: (2009, 2010)
- Italian Second Division Cup MVP: (2009)
- German Supercup Winner: (2010)
- German League All-Star Game MVP: (2011)
- German Cup Winner: (2011)
- German League Champion: (2011)
- German League Finals MVP: (2011)
- 4× EuroLeague Champion: (2012, 2013, 2016, 2019)
- Greek League Champion: (2012)
- 6× VTB League Champion: (2014–2019)
- 3× EuroLeague Best Defender: (2016, 2018, 2022)
- VTB United League Defensive Player of the Year: (2016)
- 3× LBA champion (2022, 2023, 2024)
- 2× Italian Cup winner (2021, 2022)
- Italian Super Cup winner (2020)
- 2× LBA Best Defender (2021, 2022)
- EuroLeague 2010–20 All-Decade Team: (2020)

== See also ==
- List of NCAA Division I men's basketball players with 2,000 points and 1,000 rebounds
