= Marco Spissu =

Italian basketball player

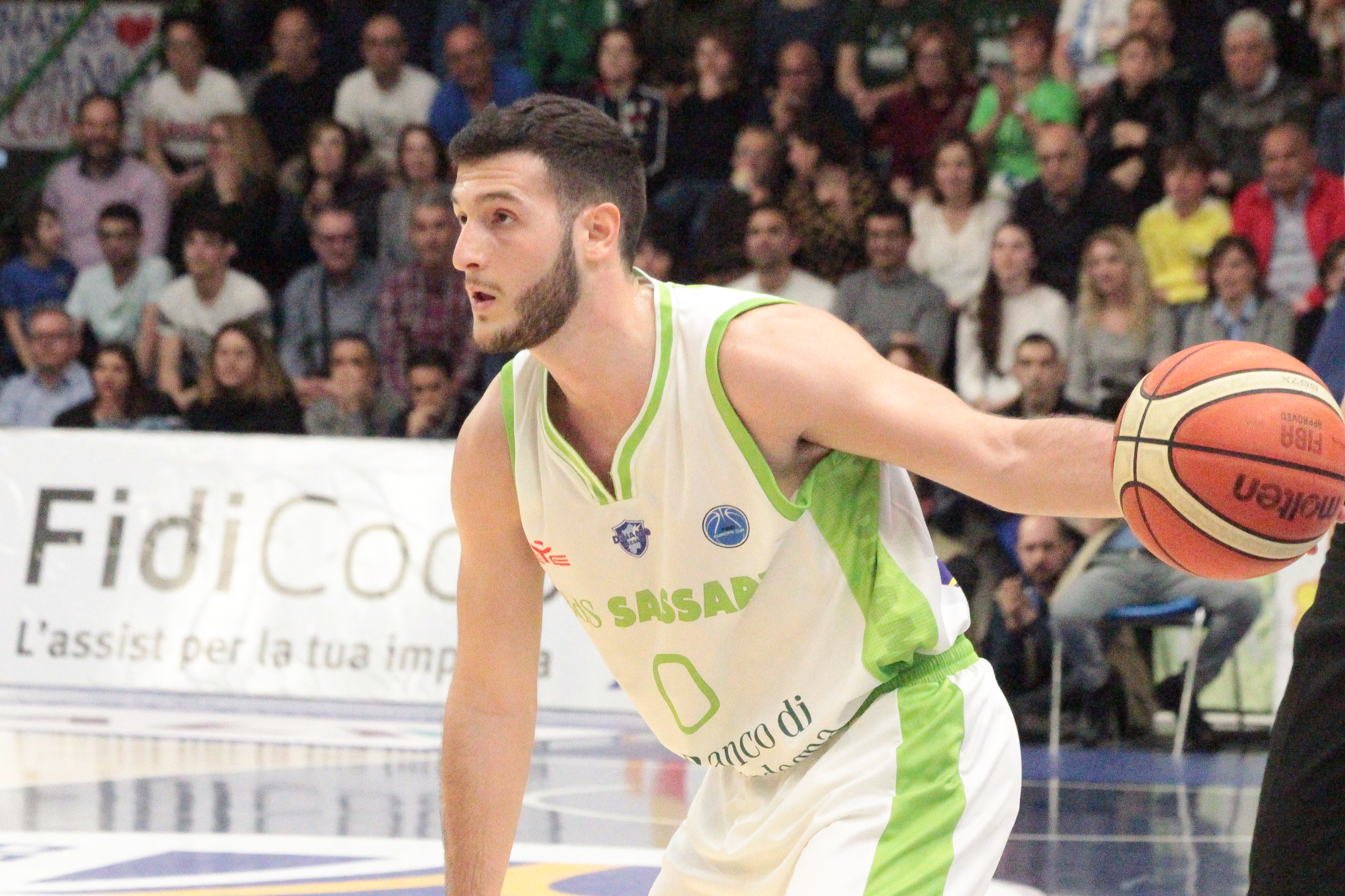
- Spissu in the 2019 FIBA Europe Cup Finals

No. 0 – Napoli Basket
- Position: Point guard
- League: LBA; EuroCup

Personal information
- Born: February 5, 1995 (age 31) Sassari, Italy
- Listed height: 1.84 m (6 ft 0 in)
- Listed weight: 80 kg (176 lb)

Career information
- Playing career: 2010–present

Career history
- 2010–2011: Torres
- 2011–2021: Dinamo Sassari
- 2012–2013: →Sant'Orsola
- 2013–2014: →CUS Bari
- 2014–2015: →Casalpusterlengo
- 2015: →Viola Reggio Calabria
- 2015–2016: →Derthona
- 2016–2017: →Virtus Bologna
- 2021–2022: UNICS Kazan
- 2022–2024: Reyer Venezia
- 2024–2026: Zaragoza
- 2026–present: Napoli Basket

Career highlights
- FIBA Europe Cup champion (2019); Italian LNP Cup champion (2017); Italian LNP Cup MVP (2017)

Marco Spissu (born February 5, 1995) is an Italian professional basketball player for Napoli of the Italian Lega Basket Serie A (LBA) and the EuroCup. Spissu usually plays as point guard.

== Professional career ==
=== Dinamo Sassari (2011–2021) ===
In July 2016, Spissu was sent on loan to Virtus Bologna of the Serie A2 Basket. With Bologna, he won the Italian LNP Cup and he was named the LNP Cup Finals MVP.

After 11 years with Dinamo Sassari, from 2011, Spissu moved in Spain to Unicaja Málaga, signing a two years contract. On August 12, 2021, Unicaja Malaga voids Marco Spissu’s contract after Italian player fails physicals. The Italian Basketball Federation intervened in his favour by stating that his physical conditions were adequate and no injuries has compromised his condition, such that he was called for the Tokyo Olympics. Standing to Gazzetta dello sport, the Italian sport newspaper, the Malaga management team had second thoughts about the deal and used his physical condition as a justification for voiding the contract.

=== UNICS Kazan (2021–2022) ===
In the end, on August 19, 2021, Spissu signed with the Russian team UNICS Kazan of the VTB United League and newly promoted to the EuroLeague.

He left the team in early 2022 due to the 2022 Russian invasion of Ukraine.

=== Reyer Venezia (2022–2024) ===
On July 20, 2022, he has signed with Reyer Venezia Mestre of the Italian Lega Basket Serie A (LBA).

=== Zaragoza (2024–2026) ===
On June 21, 2024, he signed with Casademont Zaragoza of the Spanish Liga ACB.

=== Napoli Basket (2026–present) ===
On June 25, 2026, Spissu signed with Napoli of the Italian Lega Basket Serie A (LBA).

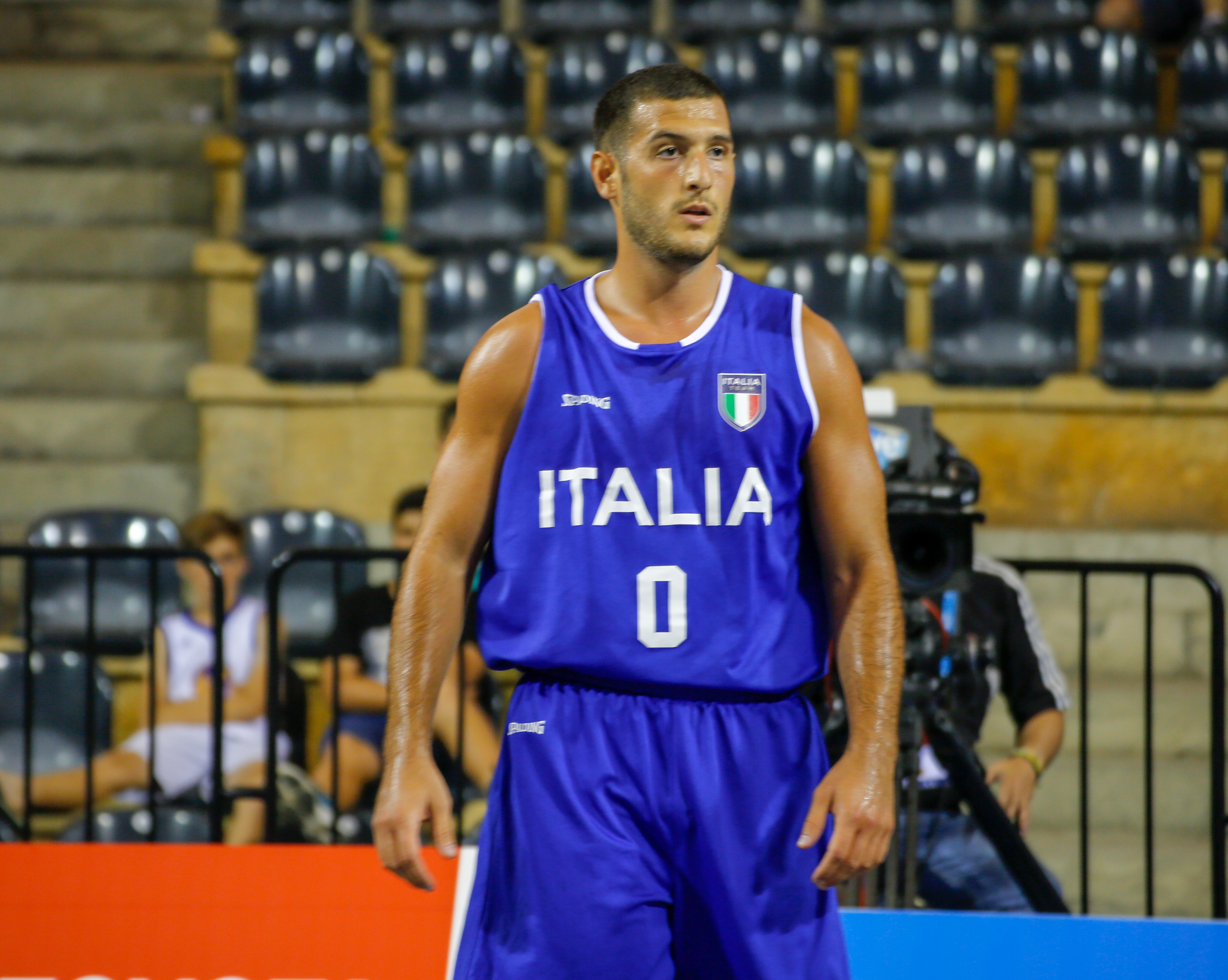
Spissu with the Italian national team

== Career statistics ==
Legend
GP	Games played	GS	Games started	MPG	Minutes per game
FG%	Field-goal percentage	3P%	3-point field-goal percentage	FT%	Free-throw percentage
RPG	Rebounds per game	APG	Assists per game	SPG	Steals per game
BPG	Blocks per game	PPG	Points per game	PIR	Performance index rating
**Bold**	Career high

=== EuroLeague ===
*	Led the league

Year	Team	GP	GS	MPG	FG%	3P%	FT%	RPG	APG	SPG	BPG	PPG	PIR
2021–22	UNICS	25	0	14.4	.524	.529*	.875	1.6	2.6	.5	.0	5.1	6.7
Career		25	0	14.4	.524	.529	.875	1.6	2.6	.5	.0	5.1	6.7

== Honours ==
Virtus Bologna

- Italian LNP Cup: 2017
- Italian LNP Cup MVP: 2017

Dinamo Sassari

- FIBA Europe Cup: 2018–19
