= 2020 Italy men's Olympic basketball team =

Italy
2021 season
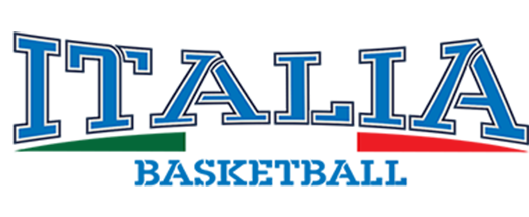
- President: Gianni Petrucci
- Head coach: Meo Sacchetti
- Olympic games: 5th
- Playoffs: Quarterfinals
- PIR leader: Fontecchio 16.8
- Scoring leader: Fontecchio 19.3
- Rebounding leader: Polonara 5.8
- Assists leader: Mannion 4.5
- Biggest win: +10; 92-82 vs Germany (25 July)
- Biggest defeat: -9; 75-84 vs France (3 August)
Home	Away
- All statistics correct as of July 6, 2021.

The Italy men's national basketball team is scheduled to play at the 2020 Summer Olympics in Tokyo in July 2021.

== Overview ==
Italy qualified to the Olympics after an unexpected win against Serbia during the Qualifying Tournament.

Only Danilo Gallinari was added to the team who replaced Awudu Abass.

Italy qualified to the playoff stage losing only against Australia in the qualifying stage. They lost against France in the quarterfinals and ended the competition in the 5th position.

== Timeline ==
- 4 July: Italy wins over Serbia 102–95 and qualifies to the 2020 Summer Olympics.
- 6 July: Coach Sacchetti submits the list of 12 players that will go to the Olympics.
- 12 July: The national team starts the preparation in Rome.
- 25 July: Italy wins 92-82 against Germany.
- 28 July: Italy loses 83-86 against Australia.
- 31 July: Italy wins 80-71 against Nigeria and qualifies to the playoffs.
- 3 August: Italy loses 75-84 against France and ends the Olympics at the 5th position.

== Kit ==
Supplier: Spalding

Home	Away

== Roster ==
The following 12 players were called by coach Meo Sacchetti for the Olympics.

Italy national basketball team – 2020 FIBA Olympic Qualifying Tournaments roster
Players
Coaches

Pos.	No.	Name	Age – Date of birth	Height	Club	Ctr.
PG	0	Marco Spissu	24 – 5 February 1995	1.84 m (6 ft 0 in)	Dinamo Sassari	(Italy)
PG	1	Nico Mannion	19 – 4 September 2001	1.88 m (6 ft 2 in)	Golden State Warriors	(United States)
SG	7	Stefano Tonut	27 – 7 November 1993	1.94 m (6 ft 4 in)	Reyer Venezia	(Italy)
PF	8	Danilo Gallinari	32 – 8 August 1988	2.08 m (6 ft 10 in)	Atlanta Hawks	(United States)
PF	9	Nicolò Melli (C)	30 – 26 January 1991	2.06 m (6 ft 9 in)	Dallas Mavericks	(United States)
SF	13	Simone Fontecchio	25 – 9 December 1995	2.03 m (6 ft 8 in)	Alba Berlin	(Germany)
C	16	Amedeo Tessitori	26 – 7 October 1994	2.08 m (6 ft 10 in)	Virtus Bologna	(Italy)
PF	17	Giampaolo Ricci	29 – 27 September 1991	2.02 m (6 ft 8 in)	Virtus Bologna	(Italy)
SF	24	Riccardo Moraschini	30 – 8 January 1991	1.94 m (6 ft 4 in)	Olimpia Milano	(Italy)
SG	31	Michele Vitali	29 – 31 October 1991	1.96 m (6 ft 5 in)	Brose Bamberg	(Germany)
PF	33	Achille Polonara	29 – 23 November 1991	2.05 m (6 ft 9 in)	Saski Baskonia	(Spain)
PG	54	Alessandro Pajola	21 – 9 November 1999	1.94 m (6 ft 4 in)	Virtus Bologna	(Italy)

Head coach

- (Italy) Meo Sacchetti

Assistant coach(es)

- (Italy) Emanuele Molin
- (Italy) Piero Bucchi
- (Italy) Paolo Galbiati
- (Italy) Riccardo Fois

Legend

- (C) Team captain
- Club – describes last
  club before the competition
- Age – describes age
  on 3 August 2021

=== Depth chart ===
Pos.	Starting 5	Bench 1	Bench 2
C	Nicolò Melli	Amedeo Tessitori
PF	Achille Polonara	Danilo Gallinari	Giampaolo Ricci
SF	Simone Fontecchio	Riccardo Moraschini
SG	Stefano Tonut	Michele Vitali
PG	Alessandro Pajola	Nico Mannion	Marco Spissu

== Staff ==
After the EuroBasket 2022 qualification tournament the staff team was updated: Piero Bucchi, Paolo Galbiati and Riccardo Fois were hired as assistant coaches and replaced Massimo Maffezzoli and Paolo Conti. Only Emanuele Molin was confirmed amongst the assistant coaches.

Position	Staff member	Age	Team
Head coach	Meo Sacchetti	71	Italian Basketball Federation
Assistant coaches	Emanuele Molin	65	Aquila Trento
Assistant coaches	Piero Bucchi	67	Pallacanestro Cantù
Assistant coaches	Paolo Galbiati	41	Vanoli Cremona
Assistant coaches	Riccardo Fois	38	Phoenix Suns
Physical trainer	Matteo Panichi	52	Italian Basketball Federation
Physician	Sandro Senzameno	72	Italian Basketball Federation
Orthopaedic	Raffaele Cortina	64	Italian Basketball Federation
Osteopath	Roberto Oggioni	50	Italian Basketball Federation
Osteopath	Francesco Ciallella	44	Italian Basketball Federation
Team manager	Massimo Valle	58	Italian Basketball Federation
Press officer	Francesco D'Aniello	44	Italian Basketball Federation
Manager	Roberto Brunamonti	65	Italian Basketball Federation
Video maker	Marco Cremonini	36	Italian Basketball Federation
Equipment manager	Curzio Garofoli	54	Italian Basketball Federation
Equipment manager	Andrea Annessa	51	Italian Basketball Federation

== Olympic play ==
=== Preliminary round ===
Pos	Team	Pld	W	L	PF	PA	PD	Pts	Qualification
1	Australia	3	3	0	259	226	+33	6	Quarterfinals
2	Italy	3	2	1	255	239	+16	5	Quarterfinals
3	Germany	3	1	2	257	273	−16	4	Quarterfinals
4	Nigeria	3	0	3	230	263	−33	3	

Source: TOCOG and FIBA
Rules for classification: 1) classification points; 2) head-to-head results; 3) head-to-head game points difference; 4) head-to-head number of game points scored.

==== Germany v Italy ====
25 July 2021 Game 1	Germany	82–92	Italy	Saitama
13:40 (JST)	Scoring by quarter: 32-22, 14-21, 26-25, 10-24
Eurosport	Pts: Lô 24; Rebs: Voigtmann 6 Asts: Bonga, Lô, Voigtmann 4 PIR: Lô 26	Boxscore	Pts: Fontecchio 20; Rebs: Melli 9 Asts: Mannion 7 PIR: Fontecchio 21	Arena: Saitama Super Arena; Referees: Antonio Conde (ESP), Ahmed Ali Yaseen Al-Shuwaili (IRQ), Yevgeniy Mikheyev (KAZ)

Starters:			Pts	Reb	Ast
PG	0	Isaac Bonga	13	3	4
SG	42	Andreas Obst	12	0	1
SF	5	Niels Giffey	3	2	0
PF	22	Danilo Barthel	5	1	0
C	7	Johannes Voigtmann	3	6	4
Reserves:					
SG	1	Joshiko Saibou	6	3	1
PG	4	Maodo Lô	24	4	4
PF	6	Jan Niklas Wimberg	0	0	0
SF	12	Robin Benzing	0	2	0
C	13	Moritz Wagner	12	4	1
SF	19	Lukas Wank	0	0	0
PF	32	Johannes Thiemann	12	0	1
Head coach:
(Germany) Henrik Rödl

Germany	Italy

DEU	Statistics	ITA
15/32 (46.9%)	2-pt field goals	19/37 (51.4%)
15/32 (46.9%)	3-pt field goals	15/31 (48.4%)
7/9 (77.8%)	Free throws	9/12 (75.0%)
9	Offensive rebounds	9
25	Defensive rebounds	26
34	Total rebounds	35
15	Assists	20
14	Turnovers	9
6	Steals	11
2	Blocks	4
16	Fouls	15

Starters:			Pts	Reb	Ast
PG	1	Nico Mannion	10	0	7
SG	31	Michele Vitali	3	2	1
SF	7	Stefano Tonut	18	3	2
PF	13	Simone Fontecchio	20	4	2
C	9	Nicolò Melli	13	9	1
Reserves:					
PG	0	Marco Spissu	DNP		
PF	8	Danilo Gallinari	18	2	2
C	16	Amedeo Tessitori	0	2	1
PF	17	Giampaolo Ricci	DNP		
SF	24	Riccardo Moraschini	8	2	1
PF	33	Achille Polonara	0	4	1
PG	54	Alessandro Pajola	2	3	2
Head coach:
(Italy) Romeo Sacchetti

==== Italy v Australia ====
28 July 2021 Game 2	Italy	83–86	Australia	Saitama
17:20 (JST)	Scoring by quarter: 25-25, 20-19, 17-21, 21-21
Eurosport	Pts: Fontecchio 22; Rebs: Polonara 7 Asts: Mannion 7 PIR: Mannion 24	Boxscore	Pts: Landale 18; Rebs: Baynes, Landale, Kay 7 Asts: Mills, Ingles 5 PIR: Kay 24	Arena: Saitama Super Arena; Referees: Michael Weiland (USA), Steven Anderson (CAN), Ahmed Ali Yaseen Al-Shuwaili (IRQ)

Starters:			Pts	Reb	Ast
PG	0	Marco Spissu	0	1	0
SG	7	Stefano Tonut	8	1	1
SF	13	Simone Fontecchio	22	4	0
PF	33	Achille Polonara	12	7	1
C	9	Nicolò Melli	0	4	2
Reserves:					
PG	1	Nico Mannion	21	3	7
PF	8	Danilo Gallinari	5	2	0
C	16	Amedeo Tessitori	DNP		
PF	17	Giampaolo Ricci	7	2	2
SF	24	Riccardo Moraschini	2	2	2
SG	31	Michele Vitali	6	2	1
PG	54	Alessandro Pajola	0	0	0
Head coach:
(Italy) Romeo Sacchetti

Italy	Australia

ITA	Statistics	AUS
25/41 (61.0%)	2-pt field goals	21/39 (53.8%)
8/25 (32.0%)	3-pt field goals	11/31 (35.5%)
9/10 (90.0%)	Free throws	11/14 (78.6%)
6	Offensive rebounds	16
24	Defensive rebounds	28
30	Total rebounds	44
16	Assists	26
7	Turnovers	11
3	Steals	4
3	Blocks	4
16	Fouls	15

Starters:			Pts	Reb	Ast
PG	8	Matthew Dellavedova	2	1	3
SG	5	Patty Mills	16	6	5
SF	7	Joe Ingles	14	4	5
PF	12	Aron Baynes	14	7	1
C	13	Jock Landale	18	7	2
Reserves:					
SG	4	Chris Goulding	0	1	0
SG	6	Josh Green	0	0	0
PG	9	Nathan Sobey	0	1	0
SF	10	Matisse Thybulle	7	3	4
PF	11	Dante Exum	0	3	4
C	33	Duop Reath	DNP		
PF	15	Nick Kay	15	7	2
Head coach:
(United States) Brian Goorjian

==== Italy v Nigeria ====
31 July 2021 Game 3	Italy	80–71	Nigeria	Saitama
13:40 (JST)	Scoring by quarter: 29-17, 11-22, 16-24, 24-8
Eurosport	Pts: Melli 15; Rebs: Vitali 6 Asts: Fontecchio, Pajola 4 PIR: Polonara 16	Boxscore	Pts: Metu 22; Rebs: Metu 10; Asts: Metu 3 PIR: Metu 32	Arena: Saitama Super Arena; Referees: Antonio Conde (ESP), Roberto Vazquez (PUR), Takaki Kato (JPN)

Starters:			Pts	Reb	Ast
PG	54	Alessandro Pajola	4	3	4
SG	7	Stefano Tonut	10	2	1
SF	13	Simone Fontecchio	12	2	4
PF	33	Achille Polonara	13	5	2
C	9	Nicolò Melli	15	5	1
Reserves:					
PG	0	Marco Spissu	DNP		
PG	1	Nico Mannion	14	4	1
PF	8	Danilo Gallinari	3	2	1
C	16	Amedeo Tessitori	3	2	0
PF	17	Giampaolo Ricci	6	3	1
SF	24	Riccardo Moraschini	0	1	0
SG	31	Michele Vitali	0	6	1
Head coach:
(Italy) Romeo Sacchetti

Italy	Nigeria

ITA	Statistics	NGA
20/39 (51.3%)	2-pt field goals	14/34 (41.2%)
8/31 (25.8%)	3-pt field goals	11/28 (39.3%)
16/19 (84.2%)	Free throws	10/15 (66.7%)
13	Offensive rebounds	8
27	Defensive rebounds	31
40	Total rebounds	39
16	Assists	11
11	Turnovers	19
8	Steals	7
3	Blocks	2
19	Fouls	22

Starters:			Pts	Reb	Ast
PG	22	Gabe Vincent	3	1	1
SG	13	Miye Oni	3	2	2
SF	0	KZ Okpala	2	1	0
PF	33	Jordan Nwora	20	4	0
C	55	Precious Achiuwa	5	6	1
Reserves:					
PG	3	Caleb Agada	0	2	0
PF	8	Ekpe Udoh	DNP		
PF	10	Chimezie Metu	22	10	3
SG	11	Obi Emegano	0	1	2
C	15	Jahlil Okafor	2	1	0
SF	20	Josh Okogie	2	1	0
SG	34	Ike Nwamu	0	1	2
Head coach:
(United States) Mike Brown

=== Knockout stage ===
==== Italy v France ====
3 August 2021 Quarterfinals	Italy	75–84	France	Saitama
17:20 (JST)	Scoring by quarter: 25-20, 17-23, 12-21, 21-20
Eurosport	Pts: Fontecchio 23; Rebs: Gallinari 10; Asts: Pajola 6 PIR: Gallinari 24	Boxscore	Pts: Gobert 22; Rebs: Batum 14; Asts: De Colo 7 PIR: Batum 29	Arena: Saitama Super Arena; Referees: Roberto Vazquez (PUR), Juan Fernandez (ARG), Steven Anderson (USA)

Starters:			Pts	Reb	Ast
PG	54	Alessandro Pajola	2	2	6
SG	7	Stefano Tonut	4	2	2
SF	13	Simone Fontecchio	23	2	0
PF	33	Achille Polonara	15	7	1
C	9	Nicolò Melli	2	4	2
Reserves:					
PG	0	Marco Spissu	DNP		
PG	1	Nico Mannion	5	0	3
PF	8	Danilo Gallinari	21	10	1
C	16	Amedeo Tessitori	DNP		
PF	17	Giampaolo Ricci	0	3	0
SF	24	Riccardo Moraschini	0	1	0
SG	31	Michele Vitali	3	0	0
Head coach:
(Italy) Romeo Sacchetti

Italy	France

ITA	Statistics	FRA
15/35 (42.9%)	2-pt field goals	23/41 (56.1%)
7/33 (21.2%)	3-pt field goals	7/22 (31.8%)
24/28 (85.7%)	Free throws	17/21 (81.0%)
12	Offensive rebounds	14
21	Defensive rebounds	35
33	Total rebounds	49
15	Assists	22
9	Turnovers	20
12	Steals	7
2	Blocks	5
20	Fouls	23

Starters:			Pts	Reb	Ast
PG	12	Nando de Colo	4	4	7
SG	10	Evan Fournier	21	3	4
SF	5	Nicolas Batum	15	14	3
PF	7	Guerschon Yabusele	20	4	0
C	27	Rudy Gobert	22	9	0
Reserves:					
SG	1	Frank Ntilikina	0	1	1
SF	3	Timothé Luwawu-Cabarrot	1	4	0
PG	4	Thomas Heurtel	10	1	5
PF	17	Vincent Poirier	0	3	0
PG	21	Andrew Albicy	0	1	0
PF	28	Petr Cornelie	DNP		
C	93	Moustapha Fall	7	2	1
Head coach:
(France) Vincent Collet

== Statistics ==
=== Individual statistics ===
No.	Player	GP	GS	MPG	2FG%	3FG%	FT%	RPG	APG	SPG	BPG	EF	PPG
0	Marco Spissu	1	1	5.0	-	-	-	1.0	0.0	0.0	0.0	1.0	0.0
1	Nico Mannion	4	1	22.0	48.3% (3.5/7.3)	22.2% (1.0/4.5)	90.9% (2.5/2.8)	1.8	4.5	0.5	0.0	11.3	12.5
7	Stefano Tonut	4	4	26.8	63.2% (3.0/4.8)	26.7% (1.0/3.8)	100.0% (1.0/1.0)	2.0	1.5	1.8	0.0	9.8	10.0
8	Danilo Gallinari	4	0	20.5	47.6% (2.5/5.3)	33.3% (1.0/3.0)	83.3% (3.8/4.5)	4.0	1.0	0.5	0.8	12.5	11.8
9	Nicolò Melli	4	4	22.8	45.0% (2.3/5.0)	27.3% (0.8/2.8)	75.0% (0.8/1.0)	5.5	1.5	1.0	0.5	10.0	7.5
13	Simone Fontecchio	4	4	30.3	57.6% (4.8/8.3)	45.5% (2.5/5.5)	81.8% (2.3/2.8)	3.0	1.5	1.5	0.5	16.8	19.3
16	Amedeo Tessitori	2	0	5.0	25.0% (0.5/2.0)	-	100.0% (0.5/0.5)	2.0	0.5	0.5	1.0	2.0	1.5
17	Giampaolo Ricci	3	0	13.0	100.0% (0.7/0.7)	50.0% (1.0/2.0)	-	2.7	1.0	0.3	0.0	6.7	4.3
24	Riccardo Moraschini	4	0	10.0	20.0% (0.3/1.3)	50.0% (0.3/0.5)	100.0% (1.3/1.3)	1.5	0.8	0.3	0.0	3.5	2.5
31	Michele Vitali	4	1	11.3	33.3% (0.3/0.8)	37.5% (0.8/2.0)	100.0% (0.3/0.3)	2.5	0.8	0.3	0.0	4.8	3.0
33	Achille Polonara	4	3	23.3	69.2% (2.3/3.3)	28.6% (1.5/5.3)	66.7% (1.0/1.5)	5.8	1.3	0.3	0.8	11.0	10.0
54	Alessandro Pajola	4	2	19.5	33.3% (0.3/0.8)	0.0% (0.0/1.3)	75.0% (1.5/2.0)	2.0	3.0	2.0	0.0	6.0	2.0
Total		4			52.0%	31.7%	84.1%	34.5	16.8	8.5	3.0	91.8	82.5

=== Individual game highs ===
	Total	Player	Opponent
Points	23	Simone Fontecchio	vs France
Total Rebounds	10	Danilo Gallinari	vs France
Assists	7	Nico Mannion	vs Germany
Assists	7	Nico Mannion	vs Australia
Blocks	2	Achille Polonara	vs Germany
Blocks	2	Nicolò Melli	vs Australia
Blocks	2	Amedeo Tessitori	vs Nigeria
Steals	5	Alessandro Pajola	vs France
Efficiency	24	Nico Mannion	vs Australia
Efficiency	24	Danilo Gallinari	vs France
2-point field goal percentage^{5}	80.0% (8/10)	Nico Mannion	vs Australia
3-point field goal percentage	100% (5/5)	Simone Fontecchio	vs Germany
Free throw percentage	100% (9/9)	Danilo Gallinari	vs France
Turnovers	3	Simone Fontecchio	vs Nigeria
Turnovers	3	Alessandro Pajola	vs France
Minutes	35:21	Simone Fontecchio	vs France

Notes

- ^5 at least 5 attempts

	Total	Player	Opponent
2-point field goals made	8	Stefano Tonut	vs Germany
2-point field goals made	8	Nico Mannion	vs Australia
2-point field goals attempted	13	Stefano Tonut	vs Germany
2-point field goals attempted	13	Simone Fontecchio	vs Germany
2-point field goals attempted	13	Simone Fontecchio	vs Australia
3-point field goals made	5	Simone Fontecchio	vs Germany
3-point field goals attempted	8	Danilo Gallinari	vs France
Free throws made	9	Danilo Gallinari	vs France
Free throws attempted	9	Danilo Gallinari	vs France
Offensive Rebounds	4	Nicolò Melli	vs Germany
Defensive Rebounds	7	Danilo Gallinari	vs France

=== Team game highs ===
Statistic	Total	Opponent
Points	92	vs Germany
Total Rebounds	40	vs Nigeria
Assists	20	vs Germany
Blocks	4	vs Germany
Steals	12	vs France
Efficiency	112	vs Germany
2-point field goal percentage	61.0%	vs Australia
3-point field goal percentage	48.4%	vs Germany
Free throw percentage	90.0%	vs Australia
Turnovers	9	vs Germany vs France

Statistic	Total	Opponent
2-point field goals made	25	vs Australia
2-point field goals attempted	41	vs Australia
3-point field goals made	15	vs Germany
3-point field goals attempted	33	vs France
Free throws made	24	vs France
Free throws attempted	28	vs France
Offensive Rebounds	13	vs Nigeria
Defensive Rebounds	27	vs Nigeria
