= Rimini Meeting =

Annual Catholic festival held in Italy

Meeting for Friendship Amongst Peoples Meeting per l'amicizia fra i popoli
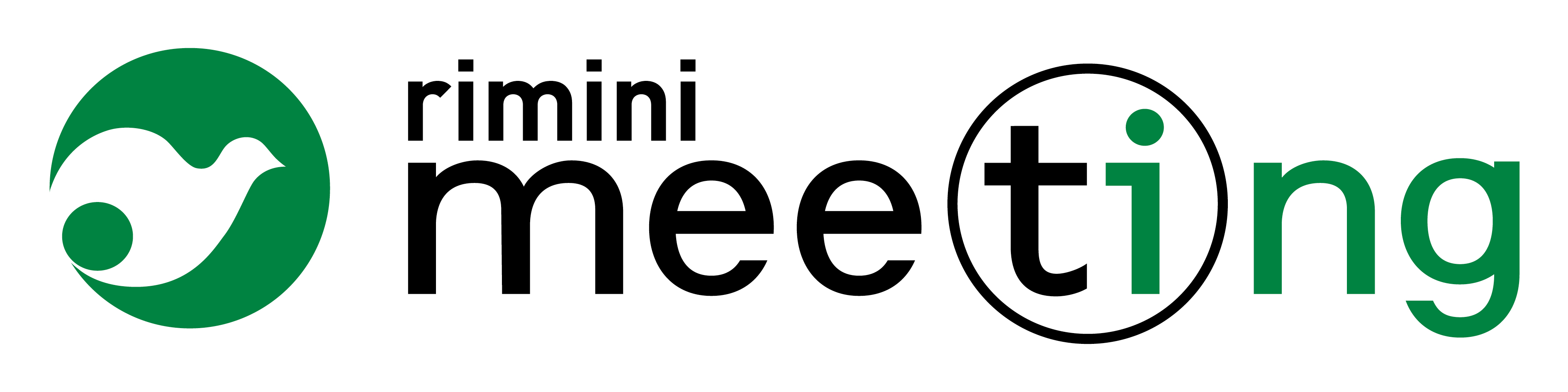

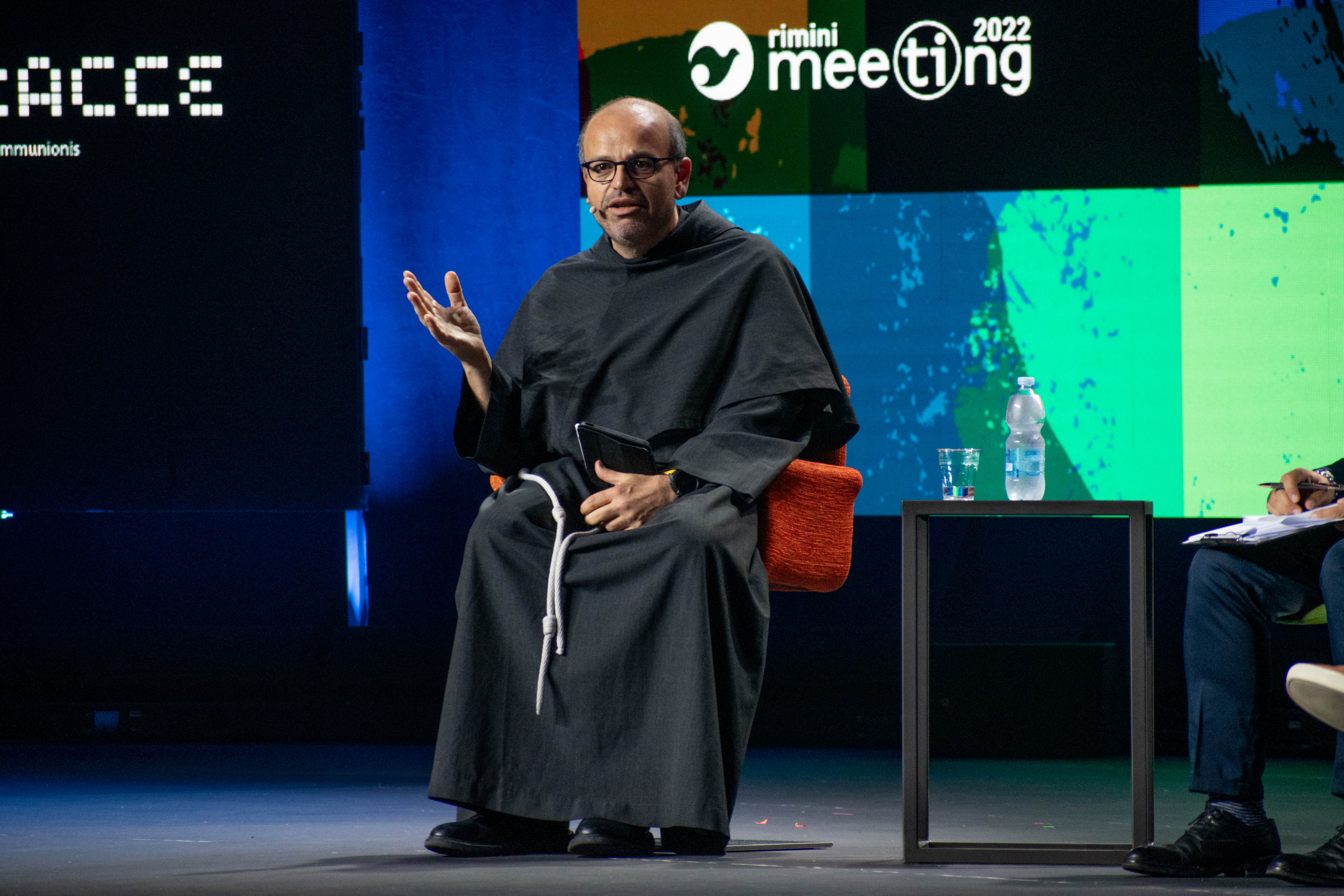
- Theologian Paolo Benanti addressing the Rimini Meeting in 2022
- Status: Active
- Genre: Religious festival
- Frequency: Annually
- Venue: Rimini Fiera
- Location: Rimini
- Country: Italy
- Inaugurated: 23 August 1980; 46 years ago
- Attendance: 800,000 (2022) • 80,000 in-person • 720,000 online
- Organizer: Communion and Liberation
- Website: www.meetingrimini.org

The Meeting for Friendship Amongst Peoples (Italian: Meeting per l'amicizia fra i popoli), more commonly known as the Rimini Meeting (Italian: Meeting di Rimini), is an annual lay Catholic festival held every year in Rimini, Italy, in the last week of August. Inaugurated in 1980, the Meeting is the flagship event of Communion and Liberation, an international association of the faithful. It is a significant event in domestic politics, attracting high-profile guest speakers, and receives notable coverage in the Italian press.

== Overview ==
=== Event ===
The Rimini Meeting is held annually in the last week of August at Rimini Fiera. The weeklong festival includes talks, debates, workshops, exhibitions, sporting, musical and literary events, and other sessions. Each edition revolves around a theme that is chosen to inspire open reflection and dialogue. In 2022, the Rimini Meeting attracted 80,000 visitors, with a further 720,000 online attendees.

=== Venue and organisation ===
The first edition of the Rimini Meeting took place in 1980, at the site of the old Rimini Fiera. The Meeting moved to the new Rimini Fiera after its completion in 2001. In March 2008, the Meeting for Friendship Amongst Peoples Association, which was constituted in December 1980 to organise the Meeting, became a foundation. Over 3,000 volunteers work during the Meeting to stage, operate, and dismantle it.

== Political and cultural significance ==
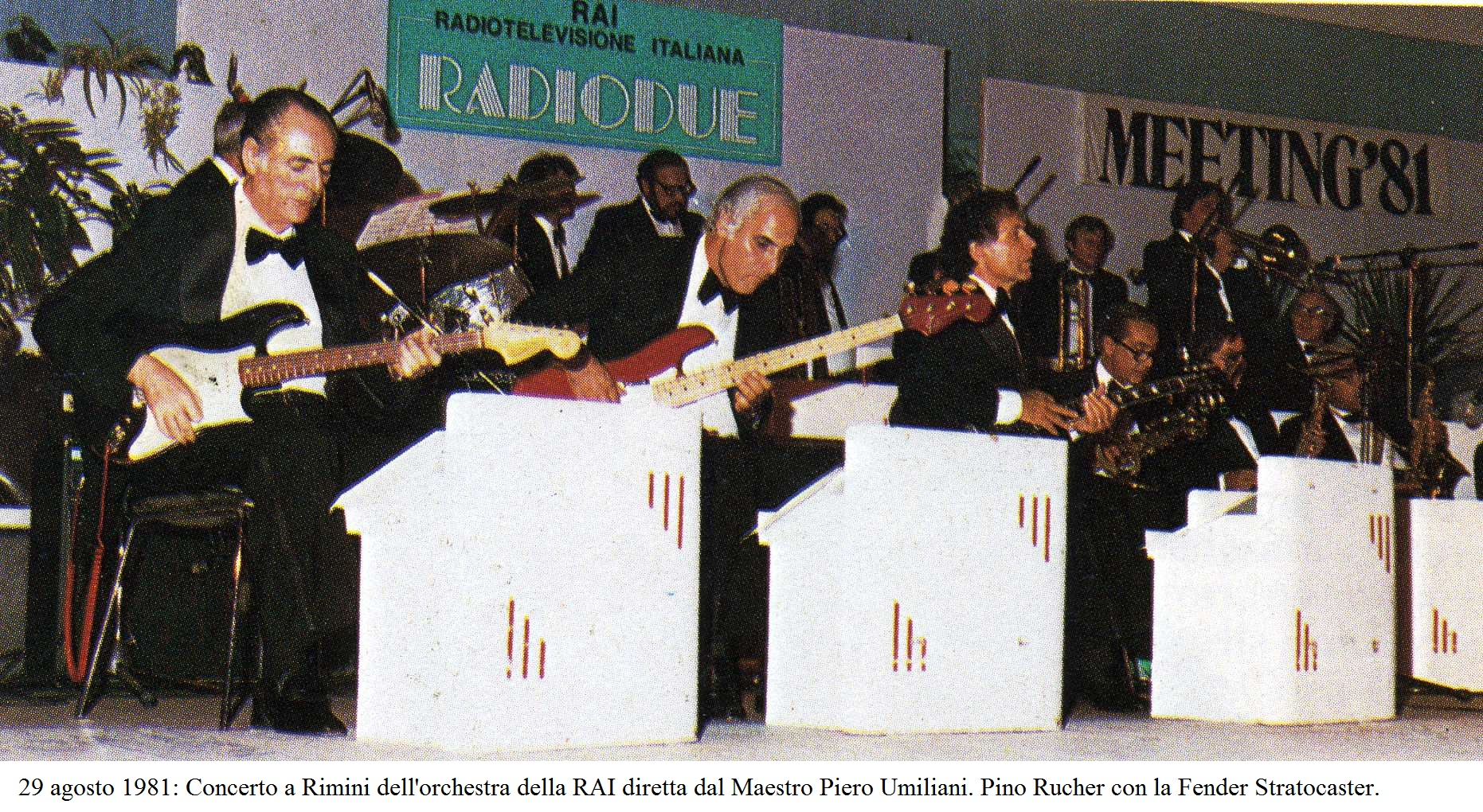
The Rimini Meeting's second edition in 1981 included a concert by RAI's orchestra directed by Piero Umiliani.

The Rimini Meeting is a significant event in Italian culture and politics, often attracting high-profile guest speakers and notable press coverage. Previous speakers include Pope John Paul II, Mario Draghi, Staffan de Mistura, and Tony Blair. The 2022 Meeting included an early debate in the run-up to the 2022 general election and was attended by figures from major political parties: Giorgia Meloni, Matteo Salvini, Enrico Letta, Ettore Rosato, Antonio Tajani, and Carlo Calenda. Ten ministers of the Meloni government attended the 2023 edition, including Salvini, Tajani, and Giancarlo Giorgetti. The President of the Republic, Sergio Mattarella, spoke on the final day of the Meeting. In previous years, national television channels, including the public broadcaster RAI, have broadcast some sessions of the Rimini Meeting, including the Sunday Mass on Rai 1, RAI's flagship television channel.

== Fraud investigation ==
In December 2012, the public prosecutor's office in Rimini charged the general manager, lead administrator and an account of the Meeting for Friendship Amongst Peoples Foundation with fraud, and seized one million euros from the foundation. An investigation by the Guardia di Finanza found that the foundation had presented false loss-making balance sheets to obtain 310,000 euros of public funding for the 2009 and 2010 editions of the Rimini Meeting: such funds can only be disbursed to organisations not making profits. The public agencies involved included Emilia-Romagna's regional council, Rimini's tourist marketing agency, the local Chamber of Commerce, and the Ministry of Culture. The group was acquitted in March 2016.
