= Bagnolo =

Bagnolo may refer to:

== Places in Italy ==
- Bagnolo Cremasco, in the Province of Cremona
- Bagnolo del Salento, in the Province of Lecce
- Bagnolo di Po, in the Province of Rovigo
- Bagnolo in Piano, in the Province of Reggio Emilia
- Bagnolo Mella, in the Province of Brescia
- Bagnolo Piemonte, in the Province of Cuneo
- Bagnolo San Vito, in the Province of Mantua
- Bagnolo, Santa Fiora, in the Province of Grosseto

== Other uses ==
- Litsea garciae, a tree native to Southeast Asia locally called bagnolo

== See also ==
- Bagnoli (disambiguation)
