= Guido Rosselli =

Italian basketball player (born 1983)

Free Agent
- Position: Shooting guard / small forward

Personal information
- Born: 25 May 1983 (age 43) Empoli, Italy
- Listed height: 6 ft 6 in (1.98 m)
- Listed weight: 236 lb (107 kg)

Career information
- Playing career: 2002–present

Career history
- 2002–2005: G.S. Riva
- 2005–2007: NSB Rieti
- 2007–2008: Biella
- 2008–2009: →Pistoia 2000
- 2009–2011: Societa Veroli
- 2011–2014: Reyer Venezia Mestre
- 2014–2016: Auxilium CUS Torino
- 2016–2017: Virtus Bologna
- 2017–2019: Fortitudo Bologna
- 2019–2023: Scaligera Verona

Career highlights
- Italian Second League champion (2017, 2019)

Guido Rosselli (born 25 May 1983) is an Italian professional basketball player. He plays as shooting guard or small forward. He is currently playing with Scaligera Verona of the LBA.
