= Veroli Basket =

- Founded: 1968
- Dissolved: 2015
- History: Veroli Basket (1968–2015)
- Arena: Palazzetto dello Sport "Città di Frosinone"
- Capacity: 3,552
- Location: Veroli, Lazio, Italy
- Team colors: Red and Yellow
- President: Leonardo Zeppieri
- Head coach: Franco Marcelletti
- Website: VeroliBasket.it (in Italian)
Home	Away

Veroli Basket was an Italian professional basketball team based in Veroli, Lazio. It ceased operations in February 2015 after financial problems.

== History ==
After taking part in Centro Sportivo Italiano (a Christian sports association) competitions, the club was officially created as società Basket Veroli in 1968. The club was promoted to the national Serie C in 1974–75. In 2002-03 it moved up to the Serie B1, the third division, at the end of the 2006–07 season the side was promoted to the LegaDue.

The club would win the 2009 LegaDue Cup, and the next two editions as well.

After suffering from financial problems and being unable to pay its players, Veroli withdrew from the Serie A2 Gold (the renamed second division) in February 2015, later ceasing activities.

== Notable players ==
- (Finland) Gerald Lee 1 season: '11-'12
- (United States) (Italy) Jarrius Jackson 2 seasons: '10-'12
- (United States) Kyle Hines 2 seasons: '08-'10
- (Israel) Afik Nissim 2 seasons: '08-'10

== Notable coaches ==
- (Italy) Andrea Trinchieri 1 season: '08-'09
- (Italy) Fernando Gentile 1 season: '11-'12
