= Jazzmarr Ferguson =

American basketball player

Saint-Vallier
- Position: Point guard
- League: Pro B

Personal information
- Born: March 22, 1989 (age 37) Louisville, Kentucky
- Listed height: 6 ft 0 in (1.83 m)
- Listed weight: 180 lb (82 kg)

Career information
- High school: Moore (Louisville, Kentucky)
- College: Indiana–Southeast (2007–2011)
- NBA draft: 2011: undrafted
- Playing career: 2011–present

Career history
- 2011–2012: Moncton Miracles
- 2012: Albury Wodonga Bandits
- 2012–2013: Bendigo Braves
- 2013–2014: Fulgor Libertas Forlì
- 2014–2015: Vanoli Cremona
- 2015–2016: Pallacanestro Biella
- 2016: Pallacanestro Mantovana
- 2016–2018: Pallacanestro Biella
- 2018–2019: Tezenis Verona
- 2019–2020: Assigeco Piacenza
- 2020: Charilaos Trikoupis
- 2020–2021: Enosis Neon Paralimni
- 2021–2022: Pallacanestro Nardò
- 2022–present: Saint-Vallier

Jazzmarr Ferguson (born March 22, 1989) is an American professional basketball player for Saint-Vallier of the Pro B.

== Professional career ==
Ferguson went undrafted in the 2011 NBA draft after having a stellar collegiate career at IU-Southeast (NAIA). He signed his first Pro contract with Moncton Miracles of the NBL Canada. After the end of the Canadian season, he moved to Australia, finalizing a deal with Albury Wodonga Bandits of the SEABL, the second-tier Australian League. The following season, he joined the Bendigo Braves, in the same league.

On August 29, 2013, he signed in Italy with Fulgor Libertas Forlì in the second Italian league. Here he plays 29 games averaging 17.6 points and 2.7 assists per game shooting an excellent 41.8% from behind the arc.

On July 28, 2014, he reached an agreement with Vanoli Cremona of Serie A, the top Italian league.

On July 2, 2018, he signed to Tezenis Verona of Serie A2, the second tier Italian league.

In 2019–2020 season he played at the Assigeco Piacenza of Serie A2, the second tier Italian league. Ferguson averaged 21.6 points, 3.4 rebounds, 3.1 assists and 1.4 steals per game. On October 4, 2020, he signed with Charilaos Trikoupis of the Greek Basket League. He left Trikoupis during December and joined Enosis Neon Paralimni of the Cypriot League on December 26, 2020.

In August 2022, he signed a new contract with Saint Vallier Basket Drome, Pro B Team SVBD France.
