= Rimini Fiera =

Exhibition and conference centre in Rimini, Italy

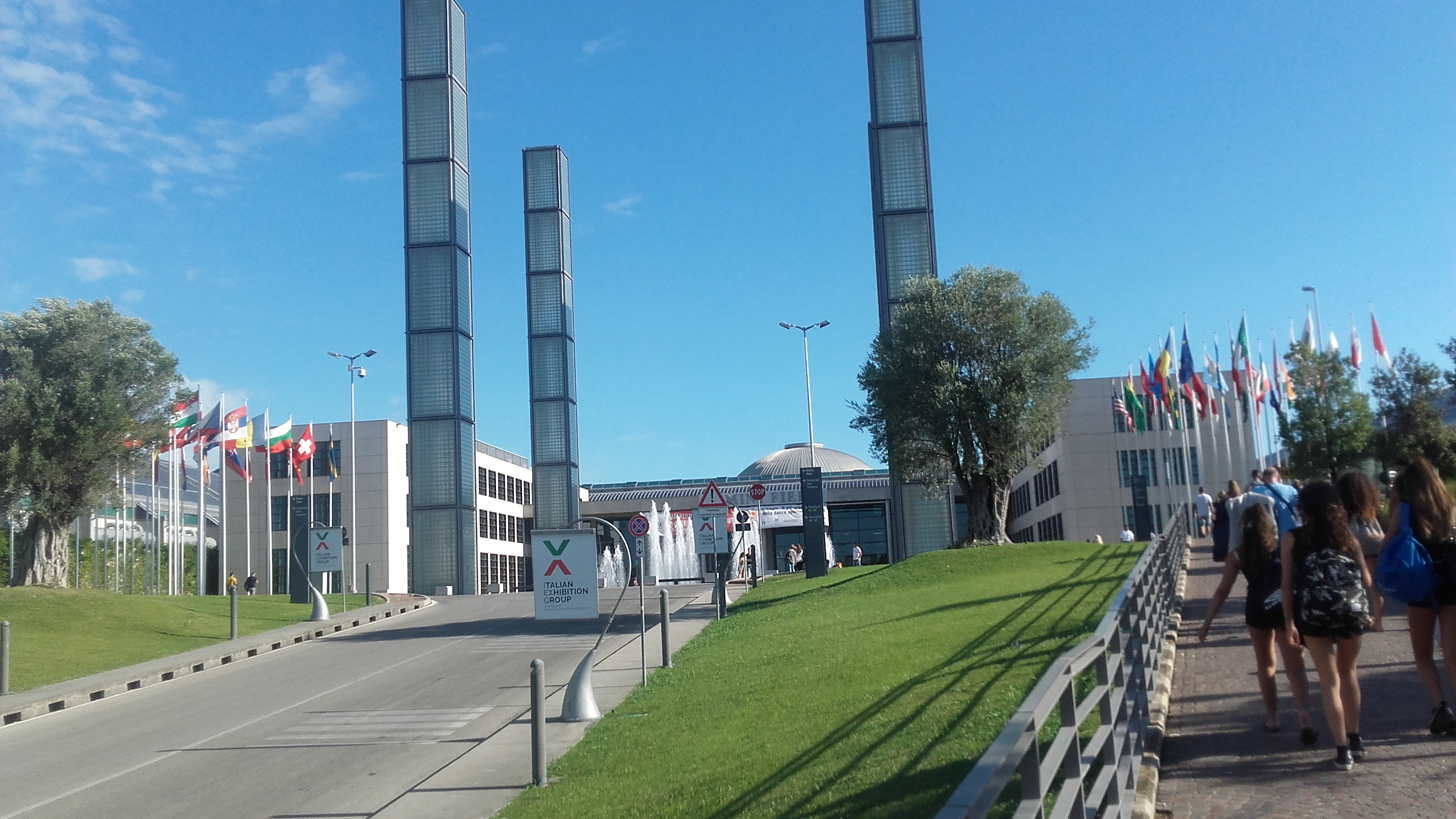
- Main entrance to Rimini Fiera in July 2017
- Interactive map of Rimini Fiera
- Location: Via Emilia 155; Rimini, Emilia-Romagna; Italy
- Coordinates: 44°04′21″N 12°31′35″E
- Owner: Italian Exhibition Group SpA
- Public transit: Rimini Fiera railway station

Construction
- Built: 1999–2001
- Opened: 28 April 2001
- Expanded: 2018
- Cost: Lit 280 billion
- Architect: Gerkan, Marg and Partners

Rimini Fiera is a major exhibition centre in Rimini, in the region of Emilia-Romagna, northern Italy. Completed in 2001 and expanded in 2018, the complex is set in sixteen pavilions with 129,000 m^{2} (1,390,000 sq ft) of exhibit floor and a dedicated railway station.

Rimini Fiera specialises in trade fairs, but also hosts sporting events and musical performances. It also hosts the annual flagship Rimini Meeting of the lay Catholic Communion and Liberation movement.

The Fiera is a major local employer. The majority of Rimini's 500 hotels reopen for the conference season, which provides a flow of visitors to the city outside of the summer beach season. The dates of conferences are also used to set municipal regulations on the touristic season along the riviera. In 2015, with the Rimini Palacongressi, Rimini Fiera was estimated to be worth about a tenth of the Province of Rimini's gross domestic product.

The Fiera is operated by the Italian Exhibition Group SpA, which was formed by the merger of Rimini Fiera and Vicenza Fiera in 2016. Since October 2023, the president of the group is Maurizio Ermeti.

== History ==
=== Background ===
Rimini's exhibitional history traces back to the Hotel Fair, which was first hosted in 1949 in the halls of the city's Grand Hotel. The fair later moved to the semi-destroyed Amintore Galli Theatre. On 1 December 1968, the fair moved to a new permanent exhibition centre on Via Monte Titano, composed of a series of blue pavilions built in the space of four months. The first exhibition at the new site was the 18th edition of an international exhibition on production and technology in hotel tourism. Among the notable fairs of this era was the MAPIR Mostra dell’Artigianato.

As well as hosting the Rimini Meeting, the Via Monte Titano centre was used by political party congresses, including the last congress of the Italian Communist Party in 1991. Prime Minister Bettino Craxi was reconfirmed as Secretary of the Italian Socialist Party at the party's 1987 congress in Rimini, weeks before the fall of his government. It was also at the Fiera that in March 1995, future Prime Minister Romano Prodi, as president of a consultancy group, produced a report identifying areas for development in Rimini's tourism economy and infrastructure.

=== Construction and early years ===
The first stone of the new Fiera was laid on 3 June 1999, and it entered operation on 28 April 2001. The Fiera was constructed at a cost of 280 billion lire, and designed by Volkwin Marg of Gerkan, Marg and Partners (GMP), an architectural company based in Hamburg. The construction included the complex's railway station, whose €5.8 million cost was financed by Rimini Fiera SpA. The incurred debt from the complex's construction was eliminated by 2015.

The former centre on Via Monte Titano was demolished to make way for the Rimini Palacongressi, a conference space which was also designed by GMP and opened in 2011.

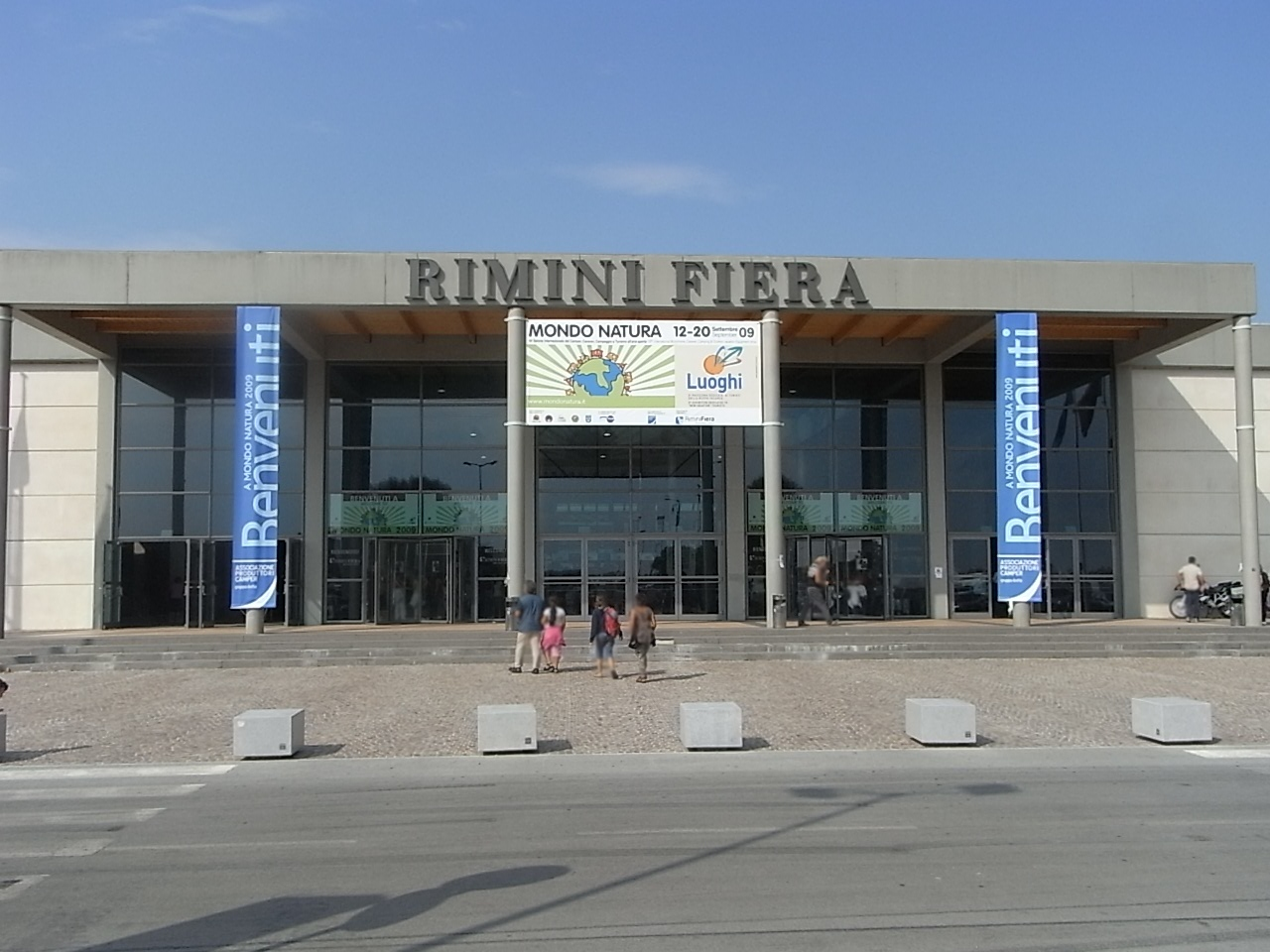
The southern entrance to Rimini Fiera, 2009

In 2000, Rimini Fiera SpA was created to own the complex. The Province of Rimini, the municipal council and the Chamber of Commerce each owned 26.44% of Rimini Fiera SpA, while the regional government owned 5.8%. The remaining 14.88% was owned by private shareholders. The former deputy mayor of the municipality, Lorenzo Cagnoni, was appointed President of Rimini Fiera SpA in 2002; in that year, the Fiera welcomed over a million visitors, including 160,000 from abroad.

In 2014, Rimini Fiera acquired the Convention Bureau of the Rimini Riviera, which had specialised in hosting congresses in Rimini. That year, it recorded 7,531 exhibitors and 1,848,785 visitors.

=== Merger with Vicenza, expansion and privatisation ===
In May 2016, Rimini Fiera signed a letter of intent with Vicenza Fiera to merge the "distinct but complementary" management of their exhibition centres, with a business focus on tourism, renewables, wellness and food. The merger was approved by the Boards of Directors of the respective companies in July 2016, with Cagnoni to preside over the new company. 81% of the new company would be owned by the shareholders of Rimini Fiera, and the remaining 19% by the shareholders of Vicenza Fiera. The merger was completed in October 2016, forming the Italian Exhibition Group SpA (IEG).

From 2016 to 2018, the pavilions were expanded to accommodate a further 16,000 m^{2} (170,000 sq ft) of exhibition space. The expansion cost €21.5 million.

In August 2018, the municipal council approved the long-anticipated partial privatisation of the Fiera. The provincial council had previously approved the privatisation in June 2015, with a view to list it on the Borsa Italiana. As part of the privatisation, the share of IEG's public ownership would reduce from 65% to between 33% and 41%. In June 2019, the company was listed on Euronext Milan, a regulated market of the Borsa Italiana. Shares launched at €3.70, and subsequently reached above €5.00, before falling to €1.89 by July 2022.

The Fiera was shortlisted to host the Eurovision Song Contest 2022. The Legislative Assembly of Emilia-Romagna endorsed its candidacy alongside those of Bologna and Bertinoro. In June 2022, the Fiera hosted the 2022 European Trampoline Championships.

Following Cagnoni's death in September 2023, Maurizio Ermeti, previously a director and hotel entrepreneur, was appointed as the President of the IEG's board of directors. In January 2024, the Dome-South Hall was dedicated to Cagnoni.

=== Future expansion ===
In 2020, the municipal government granted planning permission for additional parking spaces and a new detached eastern pavilion, which would cover 30,000 m^{2} (320,000 sq ft). The proposal was superseded by a five-year plan launched in July 2022, which included €50 million of investment and a new western pavilion to be completed by 2027. The western pavilion would add 9,000 m^{2} (97,000 sq ft) of exhibition space, and accompany an additional 170,000 m^{2} (1,800,000 sq ft) of parking space. The announcement indefinitely shelved plans for the eastern pavilion, which would have yielded a similar surface area for a projected €80 million.

In January 2024, IEG announced that €64 million would be invested in Rimini Fiera's expansion over the next four years, including two temporary pavilions, new car parks, and an automated car parking fee collection system.

There is a "well-known hypothesis" that Rimini Fiera could merge with the Fiera di Bologna. Speaking in July 2022, Cagnoni said that IEG would not object, though the exhibition centres have different specialisms. In 2014, a regional councillor warned that requests for institutional investment into Bologna's exhibition centre would see fairs transferred from Rimini and Parma. At the time, it was envisaged that Bologna could merge with Rimini as an alternative to Rimini Fiera's privatisation. In 2016, the fairs of Bologna, Rimini and Parma signed a letter of intent "with the aim of achieving functional or corporate integration". The merger of IEG and Bologna Fiera would form the largest trade fair group in Italy and the third-largest in Europe. In August 2023, it was reported that Bologna Fiera was seeking alliances with Fiera Milano rather than Rimini Fiera.

In July 2023, Rimini's mayor, Jamil Sadegholvaad, voiced his support for IEG entering the management of Federico Fellini International Airport.

== Complex ==
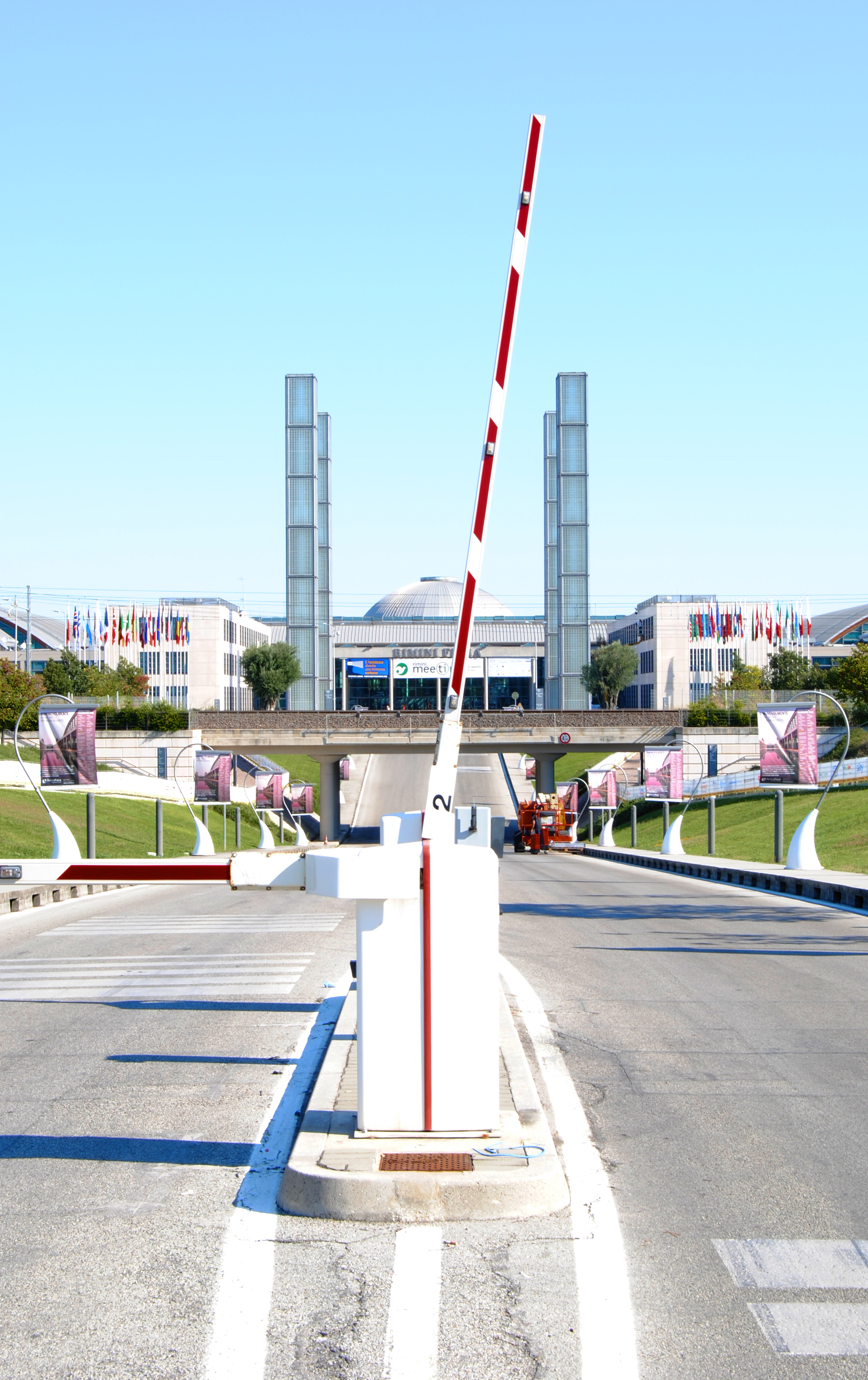
The avenue leading to the Fiera's southern entrance in August 2011, showing the four towers and the overpassing Bologna–Ancona railway

According to its architect, Volkwin Marg, Rimini Fiera was designed to evoke the "genius loci" of Emilia-Romagna, expressed in the Fiera's syntax of symmetry, speculiarity, and axial alignment.

The complex is organised into two rows of eight pavilions facing north-south. The pavilions are pillarless, and can be aggregated or separated according to the needs of events. A ring road and central distribution spine allow for vehicles to set up and dismantle pavilions while other parts of the Fiera are still in use.

The main entrance to Rimini Fiera is the southern entrance from Via Emilia, which gives access to the central body of the Fiera and its cloakrooms, offices, and catering areas. The entrance contains a piazza with a square fountain, adorned with four glass towers on the corners. Inside the complex, additional fountains run east-west in the colonnaded courtyards between the pavilions. There are additional entrances to the east and west.

The fairgrounds contain twenty-four modular meeting rooms, a press room, a business centre and various catering facilities. The entire complex is organised on one level. It has 189,000 m^{2} (2,030,000 sq ft) of usable area: 129,000 m^{2} (1,390,000 sq ft) of gross exhibition area and 60,000 m^{2} (650,000 sq ft) of services. The complex also includes a detached railway station 50 m (160 ft) from the southern entrance. In 2015, a fixed police post was opened in the central south hall.

Rimini Fiera has 11,000 parking spaces, which surround each entrance and are connected to the exhibition centre by shuttle. The Fiera also hosts a helicopter landing space served by a bookable helitaxi.

In November 2022, the complex received ISO 20121 certification, a voluntary international standard for sustainable event management.

== Meetings and conventions ==
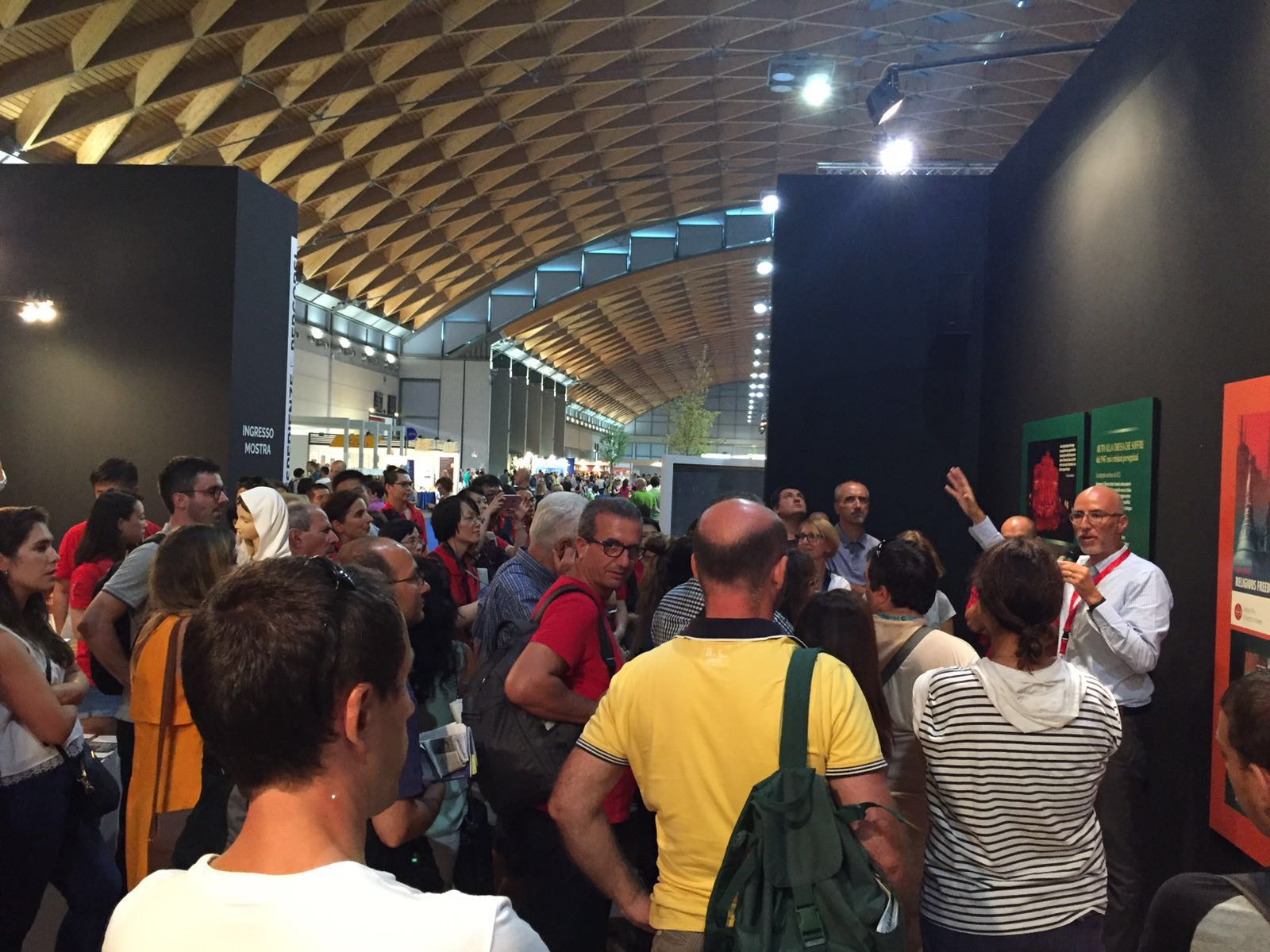
Inside Rimini Fiera at the 2022 edition of the Rimini Meeting

Rimini Fiera is the venue of the Rimini Meeting, a cultural-religious festival which has been organised in Rimini by the Communion and Liberation lay Catholic movement since 1980. The Rimini Meeting takes places annually in the last week of August, and is a major cultural event with previous guest speakers including Pope John Paul II, Mario Draghi, and Tony Blair. In 2022, the Rimini Meeting attracted 80,000 visitors, with a further 720,000 online attendees. The conference notably included an early debate in the run-up to the 2022 general election and was attended by figures from major political parties: Giorgia Meloni, Matteo Salvini, Enrico Letta, Ettore Rosato, Antonio Tajani, and Carlo Calenda.

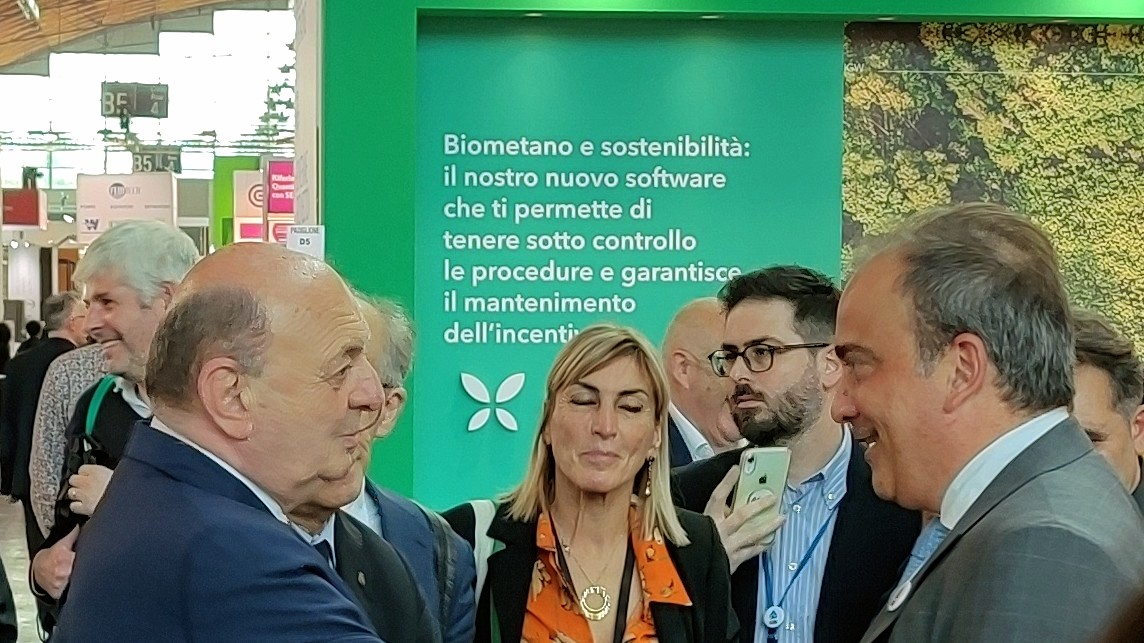
Gilberto Pichetto Fratin (left) at Ecomondo 2022

Among the largest recurring convention at the Fiera is Sigep, a confectionary trade fair, which attracted 178,500 visitors in 2023. Other recurring conventions include:

- Beer&Food Attraction, showcasing beer and street food;
- Ecomondo, showcasing green technologies for energy, resource extraction, and sustainable development;
- Enada Primavera, an exposition for gaming arcades;
- the Ibe Intermobility and Bus Expo, previously stylised as the International Bus Expo;
- Expodental Meeting, the conference of the Italian dentistry union;
- Mir Tech, dedicated to the audiovisual and production technology supply chain; and
- RiminiWellness, a health and wellbeing convention.

When interests intersect, fairs are sometimes held simultaneously. For example, the recurring TTG and Sia Guest fairs, later also joined by the Sun Beach&Outdoor Style fair, marry the conventions on tourism blogging and hospitality, with over 60,000 attendees. In 2015, 5,000 attendees attended the joint conventions of the Flora Trade Show on nursery gardening and landscaping and MacFrut, a recurring fruit and vegetable trade fair which attracted almost 50,000 visitors in 2023.

Past conventions have included Sapore, an Italian catering and culinary convention held in 2012; Technodomus, a carpentry convention in 2012; RHEX, showcasing the hotel, hospitality, catering and entertainment industries in 2013; Airet, exhibiting Italy's aeronautical supply chains in 2013; a World of Coffee fair in 2014; and Music Inside Rimini, showcasing music technologies in 2017. In June 2023, 60,000 attendees were expected at the eleventh edition of the digital innovation We Make Future conference, with guest speakers including Tim Berners-Lee, Manuel Castells, and Jerry Kaplan.

As well as trade fairs, the Fiera has hosted sporting events, such as the Italian Dance and Sportdance Championships, the Rhythm'n'Basket competition in 2014, the PosteMobile Final Eight 2017 basketball competition, and the 2022 European Trampoline Championships. In multiple years, the Fiera has hosted archery championships, including the "Italian Challenge" for the Olympic national division. On New Year's Eve 2022, the Fiera hosted Galactica NYE, an electronic music festival.

In May 2023, the European Major Exhibition Centers Association, a major association of European convention centres, met for their general assembly at the Fiera.

== Transport connections ==
=== Railway station ===
RiminiFiera
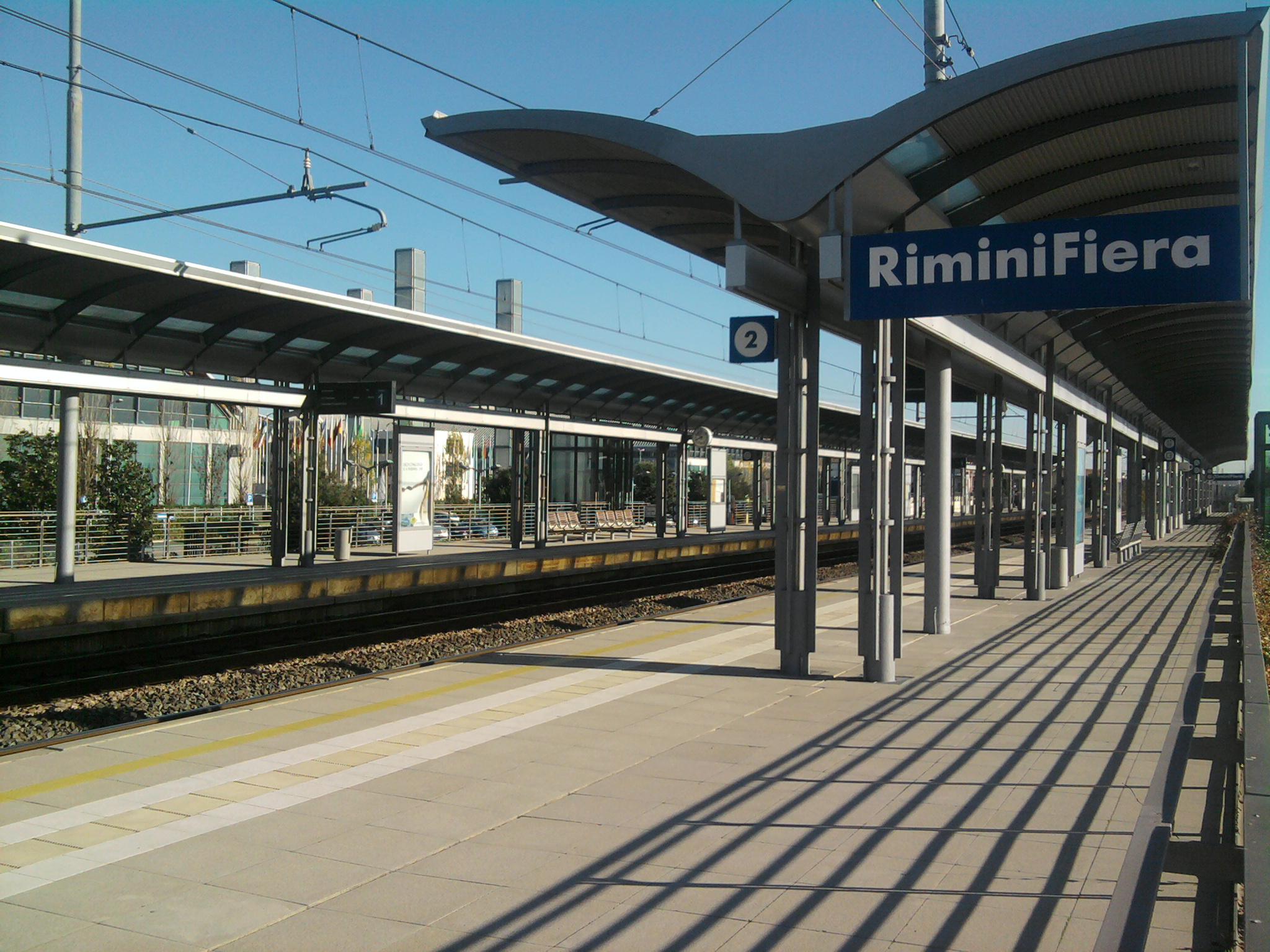
- Rimini Fiera railway station in November 2010.

General information
- Location: Via Emilia, 155; Rimini, Emilia-Romagna; Italy
- Line: Bologna–Ancona railway
- Platforms: 2
- Train operators: Trenitalia
- Connections: Bus routes 5, 10 (seasonal)

Construction
- Accessible: Lift to platforms

History
- Opened: 17 January 2004
Location

Rimini Fiera railway station (Italian: Stazione FS di Rimini Fiera), sometimes stylised as RiminiFiera, is served by Trenitalia trains on the Bologna–Ancona railway. The station entrance is 50 m (160 ft) from the main entrance of the exhibition centre. During exhibitions, subsidised by the Fiera, up to 40 local, regional and long-distance trains call at the station per day, including high-speed Frecciarossa trains.

The railway station was built at the same time as the complex, at a €5.8 million cost to Rimini Fiera SpA. At the time, it was the only modern railway station whose construction was not financed by the state-owned Rete Ferroviaria Italiana. The station opened on 17 January 2004. Its facilities include automatic ticket machines and a lift to ground level for wheelchair users.

An agreement between IEG and Trenitalia often allows exhibition-visitors to redeem discounted train tickets to Rimini Fiera. More trains call at Rimini railway station, which is the next station southbound and connected to the Fiera by local buses.

=== Other connections ===
As of June 2023, Rimini Fiera is served by Start Romagna's urban bus route 9 (to the city centre, airport, and Santarcangelo or San Vito) and extraurban bus line 91 (on school days only, to Santarcangelo, Savignano and Rimini city centre). Both routes stop on Via Emilia outside the Fiera, rather than within the complex. On exhibition days, two bus routes run from within the complex by the Fiera's southern entrance: route 5 (serving northern coastal towns up to San Mauro Mare) and route 10 (serving southern coastal towns down to Miramare).

The closest airport is Federico Fellini International Airport, in Rimini's Miramare suburb, which also serves San Marino.

Rimini Fiera is expected to be the northern terminus of the second stage of the Metromare, a segregated trolleybusway that currently runs adjacent to the railway line between Rimini and Riccione. Construction on the 4.2 km (2.6 mi) northern extension is expected to commence in 2026, and is due to be completed in 2028. From the Fiera, the extension will provide a 9-minute connection to the railway station, and trolleybuses will take 31 minutes to reach Riccione.

The Fiera is equidistant to the existing Rimini Nord and Rimini Sud junctions of the tolled A14 motorway, which overpasses the SS9 state road 2.7 km (1.7 mi) west of the Fiera's southern entrance, on the road to Santa Giustina. Exhibitions at Rimini Fiera are known to cause traffic bottlenecks on arterial roads leading to the complex. The Fiera sits near the intersection of the SS9 and SS16 state roads, corresponding to the ancient Roman Via Aemilia and Via Popilia. The municipal council supports a new exit to the A14 that would connect with the Fiera; the junction is included in the regional mobility development plan. In January 2024, IEG announced that it would soon unveil a proposal for a new exit.
