= Simone Bagnoli =

Italian basketball player (born 1981)

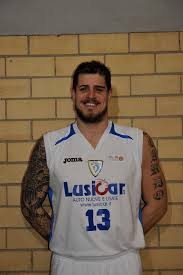

Personal information
- Born: December 6, 1981 (age 44) Italy, Figline Valdarno
- Listed height: 205 cm (6 ft 9 in)
- Listed weight: 115 kg (254 lb)

Career information
- Playing career: 1999–present
- Position: Center

Career history
- 2016-present: Virtus Terra Di San Benedetto Cassino

Simone Bagnoli (born December 6, 1981) is an Italian professional basketball player. Standing at 2.05 m (6 ft 9 in), he plays at the center position in Serie B Basket. In 2004-05 he was elected the best Italian player in Legadue.

== Professional career ==
1999: Giulianova

1999-2000: Roseto

2000-2002 Crabs Rimini

2002-2005 NSB Rieti

2005-2006 Crabs Rimini

2006-2007 NSB Rieti

2007 Pall. Pavia

2007-2008 Virtus Roma

2008 Pall. Pavia

2008-2009 Basket Livorno

2009-2010 Seb. B.C. Rieti

2010-2011 Potenza

2011-2012 Seb. B.C. Rieti

2012 Basket Scauri

2012-2013 Amaranto e Celeste Rieti

2014-2015 Basket Scauri

== See also ==
- Lega Basket
