= 2015 Lega Basket Serie A Finals =

2015 Lega Basket Serie A finals
Team	Coach	Wins
Grissin Bon Reggio Emilia	Massimiliano Menetti	3
Banco di Sardegna Sassari	Romeo Sacchetti	4
- Dates: June 14–26, 2015
- MVP: (United States) Rakim Sanders

The 2015 Lega Basket Serie A Finals was the championship series of the 2014–15 Lega Basket Serie A, the highest professional basketball league in Italy. It was played between Grissin Bon Reggio Emilia and Banco di Sardegna Sassari, from June 14 to 26, 2015.

The Finals was played as a best-of-seven series with regular season third seed Reggio Emilia possessing home advantage (with the first two, the fifth and the seventh games at the PalaBigi) over fifth seeded Sassari.

== Road to the finals ==
Grissin Bon Reggio Emilia		Banco di Sardegna Sassari
Defeated the 6th seeded Enel Brindisi, 3–2	Quarterfinals	Defeated the 4th seeded Dolomiti Energia Trento, 3–1
Defeated the 2nd seeded Umana Reyer Venezia, 4–3	Semifinals	Defeated the 1st seeded EA7 Emporio Armani Milano, 4–3

== Series ==
=== Game 1 ===
In the first game of the series, Reggio Emilia comfortably dispatched Sassari. A 16–2 run for the hosts in the second quarter helped them go to half-time 52–32 up, a lead they preserved for the rest of the game. Achille Polonara led the side with 18 points to which he added 12 rebounds, Rakim Sanders scored 19 with 7 rebounds for Sassari.

June 14, 2015
20:45

Boxscore

Grissin Bon Reggio Emilia	82–63	Banco di Sardegna Sassari
Scoring by quarter: 23–18, 52–32, 64–46
Pts: Polonara 18; Rebs: Polonara 12; Asts: Cinciarini 10		Pts: Sanders 19; Rebs: Sanders 7 Asts: Multiple players 2

PalaBigi, Reggio Emilia
Attendance: 3,800

=== Game 2 ===
Reggio Emilia cruised to another home win in the second game. Helped by 5 points from Rimantas Kaukėnas (14 points and 5 assists overall) they accrued an early 15–6 lead and never conceded the initiative, coasting to a 47–36 half-time lead. A strong start to the third quarter increased the team's lead, which reached 20 midway through the quarter and proved a comfortable enough cushion. Polonora again led his team in scoring with a game-best 20 points, complemented by 15 points and 8 assists from Andrea Cinciarini whilst Jeff Brooks paced Sassari with 18 points and 11 rebounds.

June 16, 2015
20:45

Boxscore

Grissin Bon Reggio Emilia	84–71	Banco di Sardegna Sassari
Scoring by quarter: 27–17, 47–36, 68–49
Pts: Polonara 20; Rebs: Polonara 6 Asts: Cinciarini 8		Pts: Jeff Brooks 18; Rebs: Lawal 13; Asts: Sosa 4

PalaBigi, Reggio Emilia
Attendance: 3,800
Referees: Carmelo Paternicò – Alessandro Martolini – Gianluca Mattioli

=== Game 3 ===
Kaukėnas again drove Reggio Emilia into an 11–5 early lead but Sassari came back to retake the lead and then extend it to 36–25 in the second quarter before two Vitalis Chikoko reduced it to 43–37 at the break. Reggio Emilia scored 16 points unanswered points to start the third quarter, including 3 three-pointers from Amedeo Della Valle, whilst Sassari only had 4 points during the whole quarter. David Logan scored 5 three-pointers in the fourth quarter (7-for-12 from three in the game) to help Sassari tie the game at 66–66 with 2:20 remaining, before Jerome Dyson's tough jumper put them 6 points ahead with 49 seconds left as they earned their first win of the series. Logan top scored with 25 points, Dyson added 16 points and 8 rebounds whilst Della Valle led Reggio Emilia with 18 points.

June 18, 2015
20:45

Banco di Sardegna Sassari	80–77	Grissin Bon Reggio Emilia
Scoring by quarter: 26–22, 43–37, 47–56
Pts: Logan 25; Rebs: Dyson 8 Asts: Multiple players 3		Pts: Della Valle 18; Rebs: Chikoko, Polonara 8 Asts: Cinciarini 11

PalaSerradimigni, Sassari
Attendance: 5,000
Referees: Tolga Sahin – Dino Seghetti – Roberto Chiari

=== Game 4 ===
Sassari dominated the game, with Polonara giving Reggio Emilia its only regulation lead of 21–20 in the opening quarter, retaking then increasing their lead with an 8–0 run early in the second quarter that took the game to 48–36 at half-time, thanks to 9 triples that included a four-point play by Édgar Sosa. The lead broke the 20-point barrier during the third quarter thanks to a 10–0 run, Polonara and Cinciarini's efforts kept Reggio Emilia in the game but the margin remained as Dyson scored a three to make the score 66–46. The visitors clawed their way back thanks to a 3–2 zone defense that started an 8–0 run, before Ojārs Siliņš reduced the gap to below 10 points, then 78–75 with 2:13 to go. Dyson and Siliņš trade points at the death to send the game to overtime. The teams each led during overtime, but Dyson led Sassari with a couple of threes to a 90–86 lead and the contest ended when Darjuš Lavrinovič committed an unsportsmanlike foul with 8 seconds to go as the hosts scored the ensuing free-throw to tie the series 2–2. Dyson contributed a game-best 28 points (5-for-10 from three) and 7 assists, Shane Lawal helped Sassari dominate the boards (24 offensive rebounds to 17 thanks to Reggio Emilia's late run) with 14 rebounds and 3 blocks in addition to 10 points, Sanders had 18 before leaving the game due to an ankle injury, for the losers, Lavrinovič had 20 points and Siliņš 17.

June 20, 2015
20:45

Banco di Sardegna Sassari	94–90 (OT)	Grissin Bon Reggio Emilia
Scoring by quarter: 25–21, 23–15, 20–20, 14–10
Pts: Dyson 28; Rebs: Lawal 14; Asts: Dyson 7		Pts: Lavrinovic 20; Rebs: Cinciarini, Polonara 7 Asts: Cinciarini 8

PalaSerradimigni, Sassari
Attendance: 5,000

=== Game 5 ===
Siliņš and Della Valle pushed Reggio Emilia to a 12–0 run between the first and second quarters to put the team 27–15 up, but the lead was reduced to 38–31 at half-time and Sassari continued a 13–0 run into the third quarter to take a 39–38 lead. Reggio Emilia retook a meagre 52–51 lead into the fourth quarter before Lawal and Polonara traded points for a 55–55 tie. An 11–2 run by Reggio Emilia helped the side extend their lead to 63–57 but Sosa and Sanders scored from long distance to reduce it to two points. Dyson was called for an offensive foul in the dying seconds and Cinciarini scored from the line to end the game with a home win. Siliņš led the winners with 14 points, Polonara following with 13 points and 10 rebounds whilst Kaukėnas and Della Valle had 10 points apiece, Sanders game-leading 19 points and Lawal's 17 points and 21 rebounds were in vain.

June 22, 2015
20:45

Boxscore

Grissin Bon Reggio Emilia	71–67	Banco di Sardegna Sassari
Scoring by quarter: 18–15, 20–16, 14–20, 19–16
Pts: Silins 14; Rebs: Polonara 10; Asts: Cinciarini 6		Pts: Sanders 19; Rebs: Lawal 21; Asts: Lawal 4

PalaBigi, Reggio Emilia

=== Game 6 ===
The sixth game of the series needed three overtimes to separate the sides. Sassari scored the first 4 points of the game on the way to a first quarter 24–20 lead, Reggio Emilia responded in the second quarter and took a 6-point lead on a Della Valle three, with the first half ending in a 43–43 tie. The teams exchanged leads in the third quarter and Reggio Emilia held a single point lead coming into the last quarter in regulation time, the game was tied with 90 seconds before Dyson converted a steal for a 78–76 Sassari lead that Polonara next tied, Cinciarini missed a game-winning shot at the death and the series went to overtime. The game remained close in the extra period, until Polonara three's and Kaukėnas' converted steal put Reggio Emilia 5 ahead, Logan responded from downtown and Dyson then dunked with 2.5 left to force a second overtime. Sassari scored the first 5 points of the period but the momentum stopped when Lawal fouled out with an unsportsmanlike foul, with six successive points putting Reggio Emilia in front before Dyson split free-throws to tied the game, Cinciarini had another occasion to close the game but was again unlucky as the game went to a third overtime. Sassari took control of the period with a Logan triple and baskets from Dyson that made it 109–102 with 1:50, with proved enough to earn the win that sent the series to a decisive game 7. Dyson led all scorers with 26 points, adding 7 rebounds and 9 assists, Logan totaled 23 points and Lawal posted 25 points and 16 rebounds, Della Valle's 25 points on 6-of-9 three-point shooting were not enough, as were Kaukėnas' 20 points and Cinciarini's 12 points and 8 assists.

June 24, 2015
20:45

Boxscore

Banco di Sardegna Sassari	115–108 (3OT)	Grissin Bon Reggio Emilia
Scoring by quarter: 24–20, 19–23, 20–21, 15–14, Overtime: 12–12
Pts: Dyson 26; Rebs: Lawal 16; Asts: Dyson 9		Pts: Della Valle 25; Rebs: Polonara 7 Asts: Cinciarini 8

PalaSerradimigni, Sassari
Attendance: 5,000

=== Game 7 ===
Playing at home for the chance to win the title, Reggio Emilia romped to an early 21–4 lead on the back of six points from both Cinciarini and Polonara, Sassari started a comeback in the second quarter and Logan's layup took them within three points with around two minutes left in the half, with the scores locked at 32–26 at the close. Two three-pointers by respectively Brooks and Dyson early in the third quarter brought the scores to 34–32, Sosa was called for a foul on Polonara late in the quarter and then received a technical foul call, with the hosts lead moving up to 10 points, reduced to 55–48 by Sander's points by the end of the quarter. Two threes by Logan then helped Sassari tie the game but Riccardo Cervi scored twice on the way to putting Reggio Emilia in front by 8 points. Logan then had another three with four minutes to go to tie the game as Sassari held their opponents scoreless for four minutes with a 12–0 run. Kaukėnas and Drake Diener helped Reggio Emilia back in the game, but Dyson scored two free-throws to take the lead to as much points, as Diener shot an airball on the last possession to kickstart Sassari's title celebrations. Finals MVP Sanders had 18 points for the new-champions, with Dyson contributing 17 points, 7 rebounds and 6 assists and Logan 13 points. Polonara had 17 points in a losing effort, with 14 and 13 more for Diener and Kaukėnas respectively.

June 26, 2015
20:45

Boxscore

Grissin Bon Reggio Emilia	73–75	Banco di Sardegna Sassari
Scoring by quarter: 21–4, 11–22, 23–22, 18–27
Pts: Polonara 17; Rebs: Polonara 14; Asts: Cinciarini 5		Pts: Sanders 18; Rebs: Dyson 7 Asts: Dyson 6

PalaBigi, Reggio Emilia

Serie A Finals MVP
(United States) Rakim Sanders
Game rules
Game played under FIBA rules.

2014–15 Lega Basket Serie A Winners
Banco di Sardegna Sassari
1st title

== Rosters ==
=== Grissin Bon Reggio Emilia ===
Grissin Bon Reggio Emilia roster
Players
Coaches

Pos.	No.	Nat.	Name	Ht.	Wt.	Age
PG	4	(Italy)	Mussini, Federico	1.84 m (6 ft 0 in)	65 kg (143 lb)	29 – 12 March 1996
C	5	(Zimbabwe)	Chikoko, Vitalis	2.09 m (6 ft 10 in)	102 kg (225 lb)	34 – 11 February 1991
PF	6	(Italy)	Polonara, Achille	2.05 m (6 ft 9 in)	92 kg (203 lb)	33 – 23 November 1991
C	7	(Lithuania)	Lavrinovič, Darjuš	2.12 m (6 ft 11 in)	108 kg (238 lb)	45 – 1 November 1979
SG	8	(Italy)	Della Valle, Amedeo	1.96 m (6 ft 5 in)	86 kg (190 lb)	31 – 11 April 1993
PF	10	(Czech Republic)	Pechacek, Adam	2.07 m (6 ft 9 in)	100 kg (220 lb)	30 – 19 February 1995
C	11	(Italy)	Pini, Giovanni	2.04 m (6 ft 8 in)	92 kg (203 lb)	32 – 25 July 1992
SG	13	(Lithuania)	Kaukėnas, Rimantas	1.94 m (6 ft 4 in)	100 kg (220 lb)	47 – 11 April 1977
C	14	(Italy)	Cervi, Riccardo	2.14 m (7 ft 0 in)	112 kg (247 lb)	33 – 19 June 1991
SF	15	(Latvia)	Siliņš, Ojārs	2.04 m (6 ft 8 in)	98 kg (216 lb)	31 – 20 July 1993
SG	16	(United States)	Diener, Drake	1.96 m (6 ft 5 in)	91 kg (201 lb)	43 – 19 December 1981
SG	17	(Latvia)	Strautiņš, Artūrs	1.97 m (6 ft 6 in)	90 kg (198 lb)	26 – 23 October 1998
SF	19	(Italy)	Rovatti, Andrea	1.98 m (6 ft 6 in)	93 kg (205 lb)	28 – 28 November 1996
PG	20	(Italy)	Cinciarini, Andrea (C)	1.93 m (6 ft 4 in)	87 kg (192 lb)	38 – 21 June 1986

Head coach

- (Italy) Massimiliano Menetti

Assistant coach(es)

- (Italy) Flavio Fioretti
- (Italy) Devis Cagnardi

Conditioning coach

- (Italy) Simone Stanzani

Sports director

- (Italy) Alessandro Frosini

Manager

- (Italy) Filippo Barozzi

Legend

- (C) Team captain

=== Banco di Sardegna Sassari ===
Dinamo Sassari roster
Players
Coaches

Pos.	No.	Nat.	Name	Ht.	Wt.	Age
G	3	(Poland)	Logan, David	1.85 m (6 ft 1 in)	77 kg (170 lb)	42 – 26 December 1982
G	4	(Dominican Republic)	Sosa, Edgar	1.90 m (6 ft 3 in)	80 kg (176 lb)	37 – 15 January 1988
G/F	5	(Italy)	Formenti, Matteo	1.94 m (6 ft 4 in)	90 kg (198 lb)	42 – 15 April 1982
G/F	7	(United States)	Sanders, Rakim	1.96 m (6 ft 5 in)	103 kg (227 lb)	35 – 8 July 1989
G/F	8	(Italy)	Devecchi, Giacomo	1.96 m (6 ft 5 in)	88 kg (194 lb)	39 – 2 April 1985
C	9	(Nigeria)	Lawal, Shane	2.08 m (6 ft 10 in)	104 kg (229 lb)	38 – 8 October 1986
G	10	(Italy)	Chessa, Massimo	1.88 m (6 ft 2 in)	80 kg (176 lb)	36 – 30 April 1988
G	11	(United States)	Dyson, Jerome	1.91 m (6 ft 3 in)	82 kg (181 lb)	37 – 1 May 1987
F	14	(Italy)	Sacchetti, Brian	2.00 m (6 ft 7 in)	100 kg (220 lb)	38 – 4 May 1986
F/C	18	(Italy)	Vanuzzo, Manuel (C)	2.03 m (6 ft 8 in)	104 kg (229 lb)	49 – 5 April 1975
F	21	(United States)	Brooks, Jeff	2.03 m (6 ft 8 in)	94 kg (207 lb)	35 – 12 June 1989

Head coach

- (Italy) Romeo Sacchetti

Assistant coach(es)

- (Italy) Paolo Citrini
- (Italy) Massimo Maffezzoli

Legend

- (C) Team captain
- Injured

- Roster
