= Giovanni Pini =

Italian basketball player (born 1992)

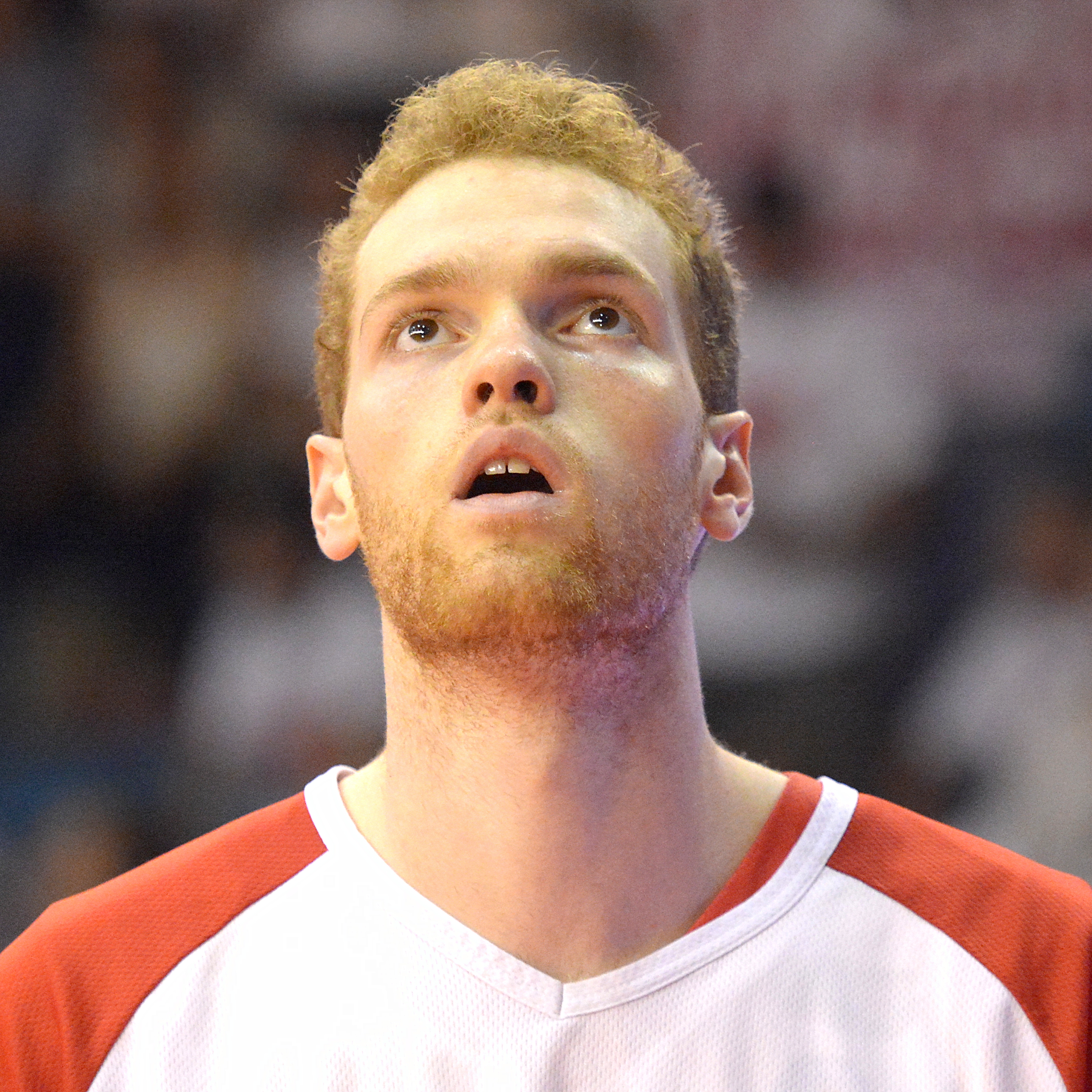
- Pini with Reggio Emilia in 2015

No. 25 – Scafati Basket
- Position: Power forward / center
- League: LBA

Personal information
- Born: July 25, 1992 (age 34) Carpi, Italy
- Listed height: 2.03 m (6 ft 8 in)
- Listed weight: 100 kg (220 lb)

Career information
- NBA draft: 2014: undrafted
- Playing career: 2010–present

Career history
- 2010–2015: Pallacanestro Reggiana
- 2012–2013: →Biancoblù Bologna
- 2015–2016: Sidigas Avellino
- 2016–2017: Scaligera Verona
- 2017–2019: Fortitudo Bologna
- 2019–2020: Virtus Roma
- 2020–2022: Scaligera Basket
- 2022–2023: Pallacanestro Cantù
- 2023: Scaligera Basket
- 2023: Pallacanestro Cantù
- 2023–present: Scafati Basket

Career highlights
- EuroChallenge winner (2014)

Giovanni Pini (born 25 July 1992) is an Italian professional basketball player for Scafati Basket of the Lega Basket Serie A (LBA). He plays the power forward and center positions.

== Professional career ==
The Carpi native played for local side Nazareno Basket Carpi before joining Pallacanestro Reggiana for the 2005-06 season. He then spent two seasons with the Under-16s and U-18s, then another two with the U-17s and U-19s, staying with the latter from thereon apart from two games on loan at Stella Azzurra Roma for the 2009 International Junior Tournament.

Pini made his professional debut on 12 December 2010 against Casale Monferrato (for one rebound and missed shot apiece), making a handful more appearances in the second division later that season (also playing with U-19s) for averages of 2.7 points and 2.5 rebounds in 7.5 minutes per game. He signed his first professional contract with Pallacanestro Reggiana in March 2011, linking him with the club until 2015. The 2011-12 season saw him behind an array of players in the rotation despite playing both center and power forward positions (the former with more success), finishing the season with 2 points and 1.1 rebounds in 7.6 minutes on average.

Reggio Emilia were promoted to the first division Serie A at the end of the season but Pini stayed in LegaDue, moving on loan to Biancoblù Bologna for 2012-13. Positioned as a center he enjoyed more game time with Bologna, playing 12.4 minutes on average for 4.5 points and 2.4 rebounds despite struggling with plantar fasciitis. Returning to Reggio Emilia the next season, he grappled a few minutes (7.7 per game) in the Serie A for 2 points and 1.7 rebounds, having more impact in the Italian Cup and also having a smaller part in the club's run to the European third-tier EuroChallenge title.

His contract extended until 2016, Pini missed the start of the season with a muscle injury, taking advantage on his return of Darjuš Lavrinovič's injury (and the departure of his brother Kšyštof) to earn accrued playing time, ending the regular season with 2.6 points and 1.4 rebounds in 9.3 minutes per game. He was mostly a spectator during Reggio Emilia's playoffs run, though he decisively scored 8 points in 9 minutes during game 6 of the finals series against Banco di Sardegna Sassari to start a comeback that took the team to within a possession of a championship victory, through they ultimately lost the game and the series.

His contract with Pallacanestro Reggiana was rescinded by the club in August 2015, he then joined his teammate Riccardo Cervi at Sidigas Avellino by signing with them the same month.

On July 23, 2019, he has signed with Virtus Roma of the Italian Lega Basket Serie A (LBA).

== International career ==
Pini played with the Italy national under-16 side at the 2008 FIBA Europe Under-16 Championship, posting 10.5 points and 8.2 rebounds in around 20 minutes per game as the Italians finished thirteenth. With the under-18s, he played sparingly at the 2009 European Championship, before posting 6.6 points, 5.1 rebounds and 1 block per game in the 2010 edition as Italy finished twelfth. He played a few games for the under-20 side but was not selected for any tournaments.

He was called up to an extended training camp of the senior Italy team in April 2014 but had to leave because of injury. That same year he took part in the summer tour of the Italy B team in China, though he was rarely used.
