= 2021–22 French Basketball Cup =

- Season: 2021–22
- Duration: 15 September 2021 – 23 April 2022
- Teams: 64

Finals
- Champions: Élan Béarnais
- Runners-up: SIG Strasbourg

Awards
- Final MVP: (Zimbabwe) Vitalis Chikoko

The 2021–22 French Basketball Cup season (French: 2021–22 Coupe de France de Basket) was the 45th season of the domestic cup competition of French basketball.The previous winner of the cup was ASVEL. The competition started on 15 September 2021 and ended 23 April 2022. Élan Béarnais won the competition.

== Bracket ==
Round of 16
SIG Strasbourg	94
Dijon	90
Metropolitans 92	88
Paris Basketball	81
AS Monaco	92
Le Mans	76
JL Bourg	88
CSP Limoges	82
Orléans Loiret Basket	70
Élan Béarnais	77
Fos-sur-mer	81
Boulazac	68
ASVEL	90
JA Vichy	70
Saint-Quentin BB	105
BCM Gravelines-Dunkerque	111

Quarterfinals
SIG Strasbourg	95
Metropolitans 92	87
AS Monaco	74
JL Bourg	65
Élan Béarnais	93
Fos-sur-mer	72
ASVEL	78
BCM Gravelines-Dunkerque	79

Semifinals
SIG Strasbourg	86
AS Monaco	73
Élan Béarnais	88
BCM Gravelines-Dunkerque	85

Final
SIG Strasbourg	86
Élan Béarnais	95

== Final ==
23 April 2022	Élan Béarnais	95–86	SIG Strasbourg	Paris
17:00 (CET)	Scoring by quarter: 26–20, 20–19, 24–30, 25–17
	Pts: Bibbins 18; Rebs: Chikoko 8 Asts: Jefferson 6	Boxscore	Pts: Howard 19; Rebs: Lansdowne 7 Asts: Mitchell 4 Maille 4	Arena: Accor Arena

== See also ==
- 2021–22 Pro A season
