= French Basketball Cup Final MVP =

French basketball award

- Sport: Basketball
- League: French Basketball Cup
- Awarded for: Best performing player in the final of a given season of the French Basketball Cup

History
- First award: 2011–12
- Most recent: Vitalis Chikoko, Élan Béarnais (2022)

The French Basketball Cup MVP (or the Coupe de France Final MVP) is an annual award that is given to the best player in the Final of a given French Basketball Cup tournament. The winner of the award is announced after the final game.

Vitalis Chikoko is the only player to have won the award two times, having won in 2022 and 2024. Théo Maledon is the youngest player ever to win the award at age 17, gaining the honors while with ASVEL in 2019.

== Winners ==
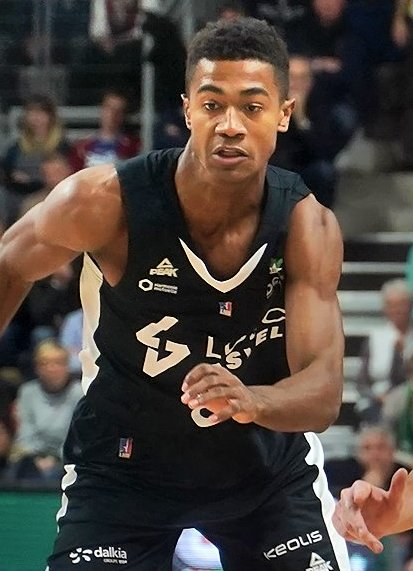
Théo Maledon was the youngest player ever to win the award, at age 17

Coupe de France MVP winners
| Season | Player | Nationality | Pos. | Club | Ref. |
|---|---|---|---|---|---|
| 2011–12 | Ilian Evtimov | France | F | Élan Chalon | |
| 2012–13 | Sean May | United States | G | Paris-Levallois | |
| 2013–14 | Trenton Meacham | United States | G | JSF Nanterre | |
| 2014–15 | Louis Campbell | United States | G | Strasbourg IG | |
| 2015–16 | Chris Lofton | United States | G | Le Mans Sarthe | |
| 2016–17 | Heiko Schaffartzik | Germany | G | Nanterre 92 | |
| 2017–18 | David Logan | United States | G | SIG Strasbourg | |
| 2018–19 | Théo Maledon | France | G | ASVEL | |
| 2019–20 | Cancelled due to the COVID-19 pandemic. | | | | |
| 2020–21 | Moustapha Fall | France | C | ASVEL | |
| 2021–22 | Vitalis Chikoko | Zimbabwe | C | Élan Béarnais | |
| 2022–23 | Élie Okobo | France | G | Monaco | |
| 2023–24 | Vitalis Chikoko (2) | Zimbabwe | C | JDA Dijon | |

== Awards won by nationality ==
| Country | Total |
|---|---|
| United States | 5 |
| France | 4 |
| Zimbabwe | 2 |
| Germany | 1 |

== Awards won by club ==
| Club | Total |
|---|---|
| ASVEL Basket | 2 |
| Le Mans Sarthe Basket | 2 |
| Nanterre 92 | 2 |
| Strasbourg IG | 2 |
| Élan Chalon | 1 |
| Paris-Levallois Basket | 1 |
| Élan Béarnais | 1 |
| JDA Dijon | 1 |
| Monaco | 1 |
