= 2023–24 French Basketball Cup =

- Season: 2023–24
- Duration: 17 September 2023 – 27 April 2024
- Teams: 64

Finals
- Champions: JDA Dijon
- Runners-up: SIG Strasbourg

Awards
- Final MVP: (Zimbabwe) Vitalis Chikoko

The 2023–24 French Basketball Cup season (French: 2023–24 Coupe de France de Basket) was the 47th season of the domestic cup competition of French basketball.The previous winner of the cup was AS Monaco. The competition started on 17 September 2023 and ended 27 April 2024. JDA Dijon won the competition.

== Bracket ==
Round of 16
AS Monaco | 92
ASVEL | 82
Nanterre 92 | 76
Saint-Quentin Basket | 74
SIG Strasbourg | 87
Cholet Basket | 77
SLUC Nancy Basket | 95
JL Bourg | 87
Champagne Basket | 80
JA Vichy Basket | 83
Le Portel | 78
Metropolitans 92 | 68
Le Mans | 80
JDA Dijon | 85
BCM Gravelines-Dunkerque | 64
Élan Béarnais | 74

Quarterfinals
AS Monaco | 94
Nanterre 92 | 92
SIG Strasbourg | 102
SLUC Nancy Basket | 88
JA Vichy Basket | 77
Le Portel | 67
JDA Dijon | 90
Élan Béarnais | 58

Semifinals
AS Monaco | 89
SIG Strasbourg | 93
JA Vichy Basket | 68
JDA Dijon | 73

Final
SIG Strasbourg | 70
JDA Dijon | 83

== Final ==
| 27 April 2024 | JDA Dijon | 83–70 | SIG Strasbourg | Paris |
| 16:30 (CET) | Scoring by quarter: 24–19, 18–22, 16–19, 25–10 |
| | Pts: Chikoko 20; Rebs: Chikoko 7 Asts: Holston 5 | Boxscore | Pts: McGee 19; Rebs: Lacombe 6 McGee 6 Asts: Booth 4 Dallo 4 | Arena: Accor Arena |

== See also ==
- 2023–24 Pro A season
