= Shane Lawal =

Nigerian-American basketball player

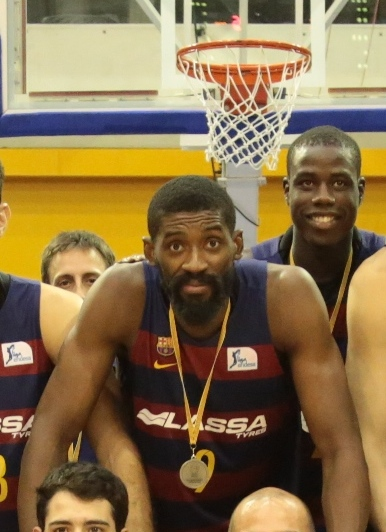
- Lawal with FC Barcelona Lassa in 2015

Personal information
- Born: October 8, 1986 (age 40) Abeokuta, Nigeria
- Listed height: 6 ft 10 in (2.08 m)
- Listed weight: 242 lb (110 kg)

Career information
- High school: Southfield (Southfield, Michigan)
- College: Oakland (2005–2008); Wayne State (2008–2009)
- NBA draft: 2009: undrafted
- Playing career: 2009–2019
- Position: Center
- Number: 9

Career history
- 2009–2010: Al Arabi Doha
- 2010–2011: Guadalajara
- 2011: Al-Ahli Benghazi
- 2011–2012: Clavijo
- 2012–2013: Tezenis Verona
- 2013–2014: Astana
- 2014–2015: Dinamo Sassari
- 2015–2017: FC Barcelona Lassa
- 2017–2018: Sidigas Avellino
- 2019: Homenetmen

Career highlights
- Spanish Supercup winner (2015); Italian Serie A champion (2015); Italian Serie A Blocks Leader (2015); Italian Cup winner (2015); Italian Supercup winner (2014); Kazakhstan League champion (2014); Kazakhstan Cup winner (2014); Italian Second Division Top Rebounder (2013)
- Stats at Basketball Reference
Medals
Men's basketball
Representing Nigeria
FIBA Africa Championship
| Gold medal – first place | 2015 Tunisia |

Olaseni Abdul-Jelili "Shane" Lawal (born October 8, 1986) is a retired Nigerian-American professional basketball player. He played the center position.

== College career ==
Lawal played college basketball for three years at Oakland University, with the Oakland Golden Grizzlies, before moving to Wayne State University, where he played with the Wayne State Warriors during the 2008–09 season.

== Professional career ==
Lawal went undrafted at the 2009 NBA draft. For the 2009–10 season, he signed with Al Arabi Doha of the Qatari Basketball League.

For the 2010–11 season, he moved to Spain and signed with CB Guadalajara of the LEB Plata. In April 2011, he moved to the Libyan League club Al-Ahli Benghazi for the rest of the season.

In July 2011, he signed with CB Clavijo of the LEB Oro.

On August 5, 2012, he signed with Tezenis Verona of the Italian Legadue Basket. He led the league in rebounding (13.6 rpg) and in blocking shots (1.8 bpg) during the 2012–13 campaign.

On July 29, 2013, Lawal signed a one-year deal with BC Astana of Kazakhstan. With Astana, he won the Kazakh League and Cup in the 2013–14 season.

On July 31, 2014, Lawal signed a one-year deal with the Italian club Dinamo Sassari. With the Italians, he won the season's League, Cup and Supercup. In Euroleague play, Lawal averaged 9 points and 7,3 rebounds in ten games for Sassari that season.

Lawal has also competed for Overseas Elite in The Basketball Tournament. He was a center on the 2015 team that won TBT's $1 million prize.

On July 20, 2015, Lawal signed a two-year deal with the Spanish club FC Barcelona Lassa. On May 12, 2017, he parted ways with Barcelona.

On August 26, 2017, Lawal signed with Italian club Sidigas Avellino. His last stop in professional basketball was Homenetmen Beirut in 2019.

== National team ==
Lawal was Nigeria's top performer at the AfroBasket 2015, averaging 19.6 efficiency, and 9.0 rebounds per game, as the West Africans clinched their first-ever continental championship in Tunisia.

== Coaching career ==
Before moving to Beirut for his last stint as a professional basketball player in February 2019, he had served as a volunteer assistant coach at John Glenn High School in Westland, Michigan. In 2019, he was appointed as head coach of the girls' basketball team at Renaissance High School in Detroit.

== Career statistics ==
Legend
| GP | Games played | GS | Games started | MPG | Minutes per game |
| FG% | Field-goal percentage | 3P% | 3-point field-goal percentage | FT% | Free-throw percentage |
| RPG | Rebounds per game | APG | Assists per game | SPG | Steals per game |
| BPG | Blocks per game | PPG | Points per game | PIR | Performance index rating |
| **Bold** | Career high |

=== EuroLeague ===
| Year | Team | GP | GS | MPG | FG% | 3P% | FT% | RPG | APG | SPG | BPG | PPG | PIR |
|---|---|---|---|---|---|---|---|---|---|---|---|---|---|
| 2014–15 | Sassari | 10 | **8** | **23.0** | .617 | .000 | .471 | **7.3** | **1.4** | **1.5** | **1.5** | **9.0** | **15.0** |
| 2015–16 | Barcelona | **17** | 0 | 14.9 | **.673** | .000 | **.594** | 4.1 | .6 | .5 | .7 | 5.2 | 7.7 |
| Career | | 27 | 8 | 17.9 | .643 | .000 | .530 | 5.3 | .9 | .9 | 1.0 | 6.6 | 10.4 |
