= Jerome Dyson =

American basketball player (born 1987)

Personal information
- Born: May 1, 1987 (age 39) Rockville, Maryland, U.S.
- Listed height: 6 ft 3 in (1.91 m)
- Listed weight: 180 lb (82 kg)

Career information
- High school: Proctor Academy (Andover, New Hampshire)
- College: UConn (2006–2010)
- NBA draft: 2010: undrafted
- Playing career: 2010–2021
- Position: Point guard / shooting guard
- Number: 11

Career history
- 2010–2012: Tulsa 66ers
- 2012: New Orleans Hornets
- 2012–2013: Hapoel Holon
- 2013–2014: Enel Brindisi
- 2014–2015: Dinamo Sassari
- 2015–2016: Auxilium CUS Torino
- 2016–2018: Hapoel Jerusalem
- 2018: Jiangsu Dragons
- 2019: Bnei Herzliya
- 2019–2020: Virtus Roma
- 2020: Fortitudo Bologna
- 2020–2021: Spójnia Stargard

Career highlights
- Israeli League champion (2017); Israeli League Final Four MVP (2017); All-Israeli League First Team (2018); 2× Israeli League All-Star (2013, 2018); Israeli League Cup winner (2016); Israeli League Top Scorer (2013); Italian Serie A champion (2015); Italian Cup winner (2015); Italian Supercup winner (2014); Italian Supercup MVP (2014); NBA D-League All-Star (2012); Third-team All-Big East (2010)
- Stats at NBA.com
- Stats at Basketball Reference
Medals
Men's basketball
Representing United States
Pan American Games
Bronze medal – third place	2011 Guadalajara	Team

Jerome Clifton Dyson (born May 1, 1987) is an American former professional basketball player. He played college basketball with the Connecticut Huskies before playing professionally in the NBA with the New Orleans Hornets, he has also played overseas in Italy, Israel and China. He was the 2012–13 top scorer in the Israel Basketball Premier League. He was also the 2017 Israeli Basketball Premier League Finals MVP.

== Early life and college ==
Dyson grew up in Potomac, Maryland's Scotland neighborhood. He attended Winston Churchill High School in Potomac for his first two years of high school before transferring to Proctor Academy in Andover, New Hampshire for his final two years. While at Proctor, Dyson matured and was recruited to play basketball with the University of Connecticut Huskies under coach Jim Calhoun. During his freshman season at UConn, Dyson was compared by Calhoun to NBA players and UConn alumni Ray Allen and Richard Hamilton. During his sophomore season, he and teammate Doug Wiggins were caught by on-campus police in a car with alcohol. He was eventually reinstated. In February 2009 during his junior year, he tore a lateral meniscus in his right knee in an on-court collision with Syracuse University guard Andy Rautins. At the time of the injury, he had started all 24 games for the Huskies, scoring in double figures 18 times and averaging 13.2 points per game. He returned the following season and scored 17.7 points and 4.4 assists per game. In March 2010, the Sporting News named Dyson their 2010 Comeback Player of the Year.

== Professional career ==
=== 2010–11 season ===
Dyson went undrafted in the 2010 NBA draft and played with the Cleveland Cavaliers and Oklahoma City Thunder during the 2010 summer league and preseason before being cut. He then signed with the Thunder's NBA Development League affiliate, the Tulsa 66ers. He appeared in 47 games with the 66ers, starting 10. He averaged 15.5 points and 27.3 minutes per game and was the team's leading scorer. Following the season, Dyson was named to the United States men's national basketball team for the 2011 Pan American Games in Guadalajara, Mexico. Dyson averaged 11.4 points, including a team high 19 against Uruguay. The team, composed entirely of non-NBA players due to the 2011 NBA lockout, finished with the bronze medal.

=== 2011–12 season ===
On December 9, Dyson was among nine players added to the training camp roster of the New Orleans Hornets. He did not make their final roster, and returned to the 66ers. However, the Hornets signed him to a ten-day contract on April 10, 2012. During his nine-game stint with the Hornets, he would average 7.4 points, 2.1 rebounds, 2.0 assists, and 1.2 steals per game. He would also start for them for one game.

=== 2012–13 season ===
On July 27, 2012, Dyson was traded to the Phoenix Suns in a three-team deal. He was waived by the Suns on August 15, 2012. Later that year, he signed a one-year deal with Hapoel Holon to play in Israel. He was the 2012–13 top scorer in the Israel Basketball Premier League.

=== 2013–14 season ===
Dyson played with the Charlotte Bobcats during the 2013 NBA Summer League. After the summer league ended, he signed a one-year deal with Enel Brindisi to play in Italy.

=== 2014–15 season ===
On July 10, 2014, he signed with the Italian Euroleague team Dinamo Sassari for the 2014–15 season. Here, he won the Italian SuperCup, the Italian Cup and the Italian Championship, in a seven game series against Pallacanestro Reggiana

=== 2015–16 season ===
On November 23, 2015, he signed with the Italian League team Auxilium CUS Torino for the rest of the season.

=== 2016–17 season ===
On July 12, 2016, Dyson returned to Israel and signed a two-year deal with Hapoel Jerusalem. During that season, Dyson won Israeli League Cup with Jerusalem, as well as reaching the EuroCup semifinals.

On June 15, 2017, Dyson recorded a season-high 30 points, along with 6 rebounds, 5 assists and 2 steals in the championship final game against Maccabi Haifa, leading Jerusalem to win the 2017 Israeli League Championship after an 83–76 victory, he was later named Finals MVP.

=== 2017–18 season ===
On July 4, 2017, Dyson signed a one-year contract extension with Jerusalem. On December 16, 2017, Dyson recorded 29 points, 3 rebounds and 3 assists, including a game-winning layup with 10.9 seconds left in an 88–86 win over Hapoel Holon. On January 15, 2018, Dyson recorded a season-high 30 points, shooting 8-for-11 from the three-point range, along with 5 assists and 3 steals, in a 92–78 win over Maccabi Rishon LeZion.

During his second season with Jerusalem, Dyson participated in the Israeli League All-Star Game and the Three-Point Shootout during the same event. He was named three-time MVP of the Round. On June 8, 2018, Dyson was named 2018 All-Israeli League First Team.

Dyson led Jerusalem to the 2018 Israeli League Final Four, where they eventually lost to Hapoel Holon. In 47 games played during the 2017–18 season (played in the Israeli League and the EuroCup), Dyson averaged 16.6 points, 4 rebounds, 3.3 assists and 1.6 steals per game.

=== 2018–19 season ===
On July 8, 2018, Dyson signed with the Chinese team Jiangsu Dragons for the 2018–19 season. However, In November 2018, Dyson parted ways with Jiangsu after appearing in six games due to a thumb injury.

On February 10, 2019, Dyson returned to Israel for a third stint, joining Bnei Herzliya for the rest of the season. In 15 games played for Herzliya, he averaged 17.2 points, 3.2 rebounds, 3.7 assists and 1.8 steals per game.

=== 2019–20 season ===
On July 26, 2019, Dyson returned to Italy for a second stint, signing with Virtus Roma for the 2019–20 season. On February 26 he transferred to Fortitudo Bologna that was looking for someone to replace Kassius Robertson who was injured with the Canadian national team during the 2021 FIBA AmeriCup qualifiers.

=== 2020–21 season ===
On December 25, 2020, he has signed with Spójnia Stargard of the PLK.

== The Basketball Tournament ==
In 2017, Dyson played for The CITI Team of The Basketball Tournament. The Basketball Tournament is an annual $2 million winner-take-all tournament broadcast on ESPN.

== Career statistics ==
=== EuroLeague ===
Legend
GP	Games played	GS	Games started	MPG	Minutes per game
FG%	Field-goal percentage	3P%	3-point field-goal percentage	FT%	Free-throw percentage
RPG	Rebounds per game	APG	Assists per game	SPG	Steals per game
BPG	Blocks per game	PPG	Points per game	PIR	Performance index rating
**Bold**	Career high

Year	Team	GP	GS	MPG	FG%	3P%	FT%	RPG	APG	SPG	BPG	PPG	PIR
2014–15	Sassari	10	10	23.9	.353	.289	.531	2.5	3.0	1.7	.1	10.2	5.9
Career		10	10	23.9	.353	.289	.531	2.5	3.0	1.7	.1	10.2	5.9

=== NBA ===
Year	Team	GP	GS	MPG	FG%	3P%	FT%	RPG	APG	SPG	BPG	PPG
2011–12	New Orleans	9	1	20.0	.396	.125	.778	2.1	2.0	1.2	.2	7.4
Career		9	1	20.0	.396	.125	.778	2.1	2.0	1.2	.2	7.4

== Personal ==
Dyson's mother, Julie, is a pastor at the Immanuel Church of God in Germantown, Maryland. He has two children.
