= LBA Finals MVP =

Basketball award in Italy

The Lega Basket Serie A (LBA) Finals Most Valuable Player (MVP) is an annual award given by the 1st-tier of Italian professional basketball, the Lega Basket Serie A (LBA). It has been awarded since the 2003–04 season to the league's most valuable player in the league's deciding Finals series of the playoffs.

== Winners ==
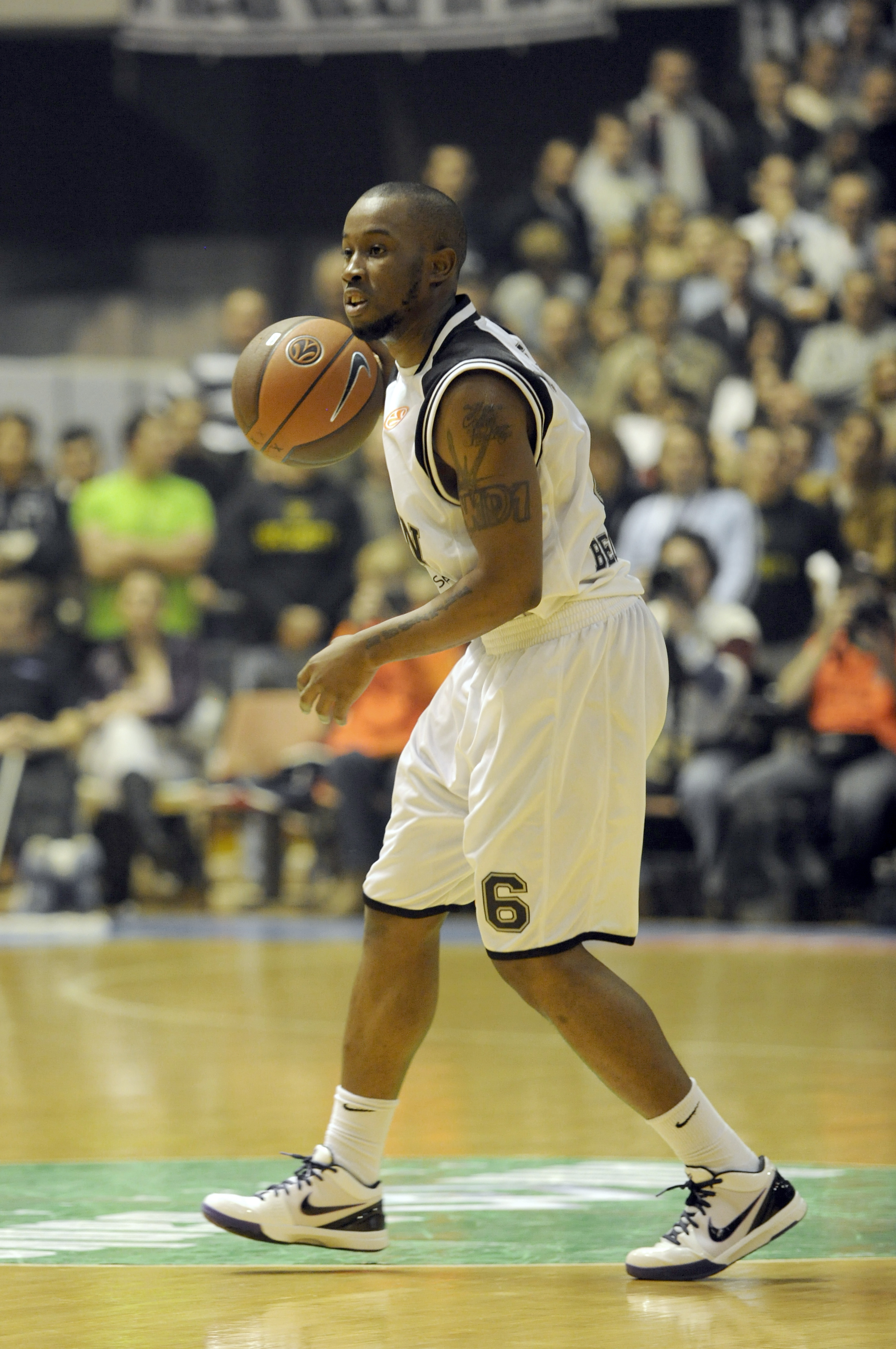
Bo McCalebb (2010; 2011)

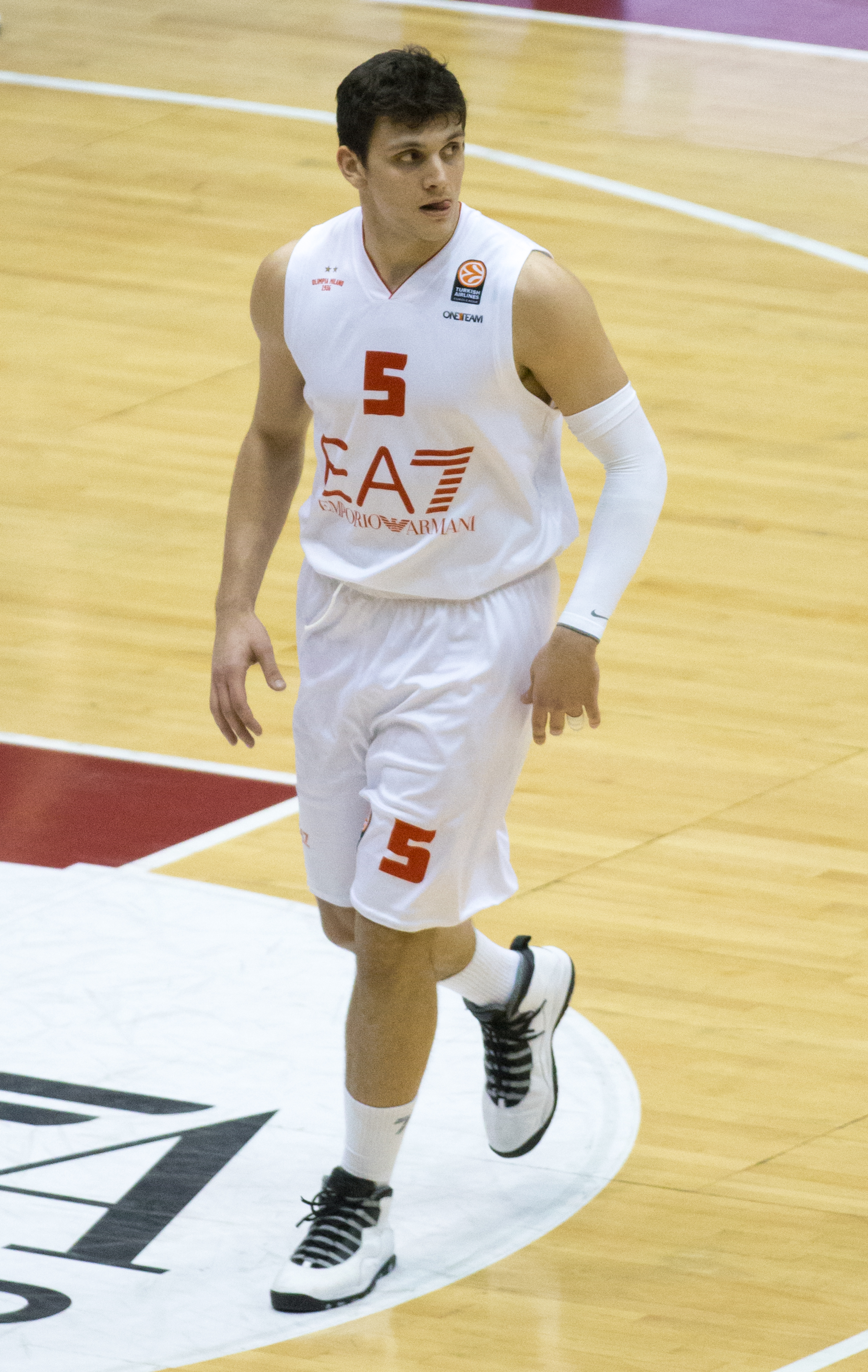
Alessandro Gentile (2014)

Key
Player (X)	Name of the player and number of times they had won the award at that point (if more than one)
†	Indicates multiple award winners in the same season

- Player nationalities by national team.

Season	Player	Pos.	Nationality	Team	Ref(s)
2003–04	David Andersen	C	Australia (Note: Anderson also owns Danish nationality.)	Montepaschi Siena	
2004–05	Gianluca Basile	SG	Italy	Climamio Bologna	
2005–06	Ramūnas Šiškauskas	SF	Lithuania	Benetton Treviso	
2006–07	Rimantas Kaukėnas	SG	Lithuania	Montepaschi Siena	
2007–08	Terrell McIntyre	PG	United States	Montepaschi Siena	
2008–09	Terrell McIntyre (2)	PG	United States	Montepaschi Siena	
2009–10	Terrell McIntyre (3)	PG	United States	Montepaschi Siena	
2010–11	Bo McCalebb	PG	(North Macedonia) Macedonia (Note: McCalebb also owns American nationality.)	Montepaschi Siena	
2011–12	Bo McCalebb (2)	PG	(North Macedonia) Macedonia (Note: McCalebb also owns American nationality.)	Montepaschi Siena	
2012–13	Daniel Hackett	PG/SG	Italy (Note: Hackett also owns American nationality.)	Montepaschi Siena	
2013–14	Alessandro Gentile	SF	Italy	EA7 Emporio Armani Milano	
2014–15	Rakim Sanders	SF	United States	Banco di Sardegna Sassari	
2015–16	Rakim Sanders (2)	SF	United States	EA7 Emporio Armani Milano	
2016–17	Melvin Ejim	SF	Canada	Umana Reyer Venezia	
2017–18	Andrew Goudelock	SG	United States	EA7 Emporio Armani Milano	
2018–19	Austin Daye	PF	United States	Umana Reyer Venezia	
2019–20	Season cancelled due to COVID-19 pandemic				
2020–21	Miloš Teodosić	PG	Serbia	Virtus Segafredo Bologna	
2021–22	Shavon Shields	SF	Denmark	Olimpia Milano	
2022–23	Luigi Datome	SF	Italy	Olimpia Milano	
2023–24	Nikola Mirotic	PF	Spain	Olimpia Milano	
2024–25	Tornike Shengelia	PF	Georgia	Virtus Bologna	
2025–26	Armoni Brooks	SG	United States	Olimpia Milano	

== See also ==
- Lega Basket Serie A MVP
- Lega Basket Serie A awards
