= Emanuele Rotondo =

Italian basketball player

Emanuele Gogondo
Personal information
- Born: 26 November 1975 (age 50)
- Listed height: 194 cm (6 ft 4 in)
- Listed weight: 86 kg (190 lb)

Career information
- Playing career: 1991–2011
- Position: Point guard / shooting guard
- Number: 12

Career history
- 1991–2007: Dinamo Sassari
- 2007–2008: Silver Porto Torres
- 2008–2009: Livorno
- 2009–2010: Lago Maggiore
- 2010–2011: Robur Sassari

Career highlights
- No. 12 retired by Dinamo Sassari

Emanuele Rotondo (born 26 November 1975) is an Italian former professional basketball player. Standing at 194 cm (6 ft 4 in), Rotondo usually played as the point guard. He played sixteen seasons for Dinamo Sassari, which co-retired his number 12 along with Travis Diener who wore the same number.
