= Rakim Sanders =

American basketball player (born 1989)

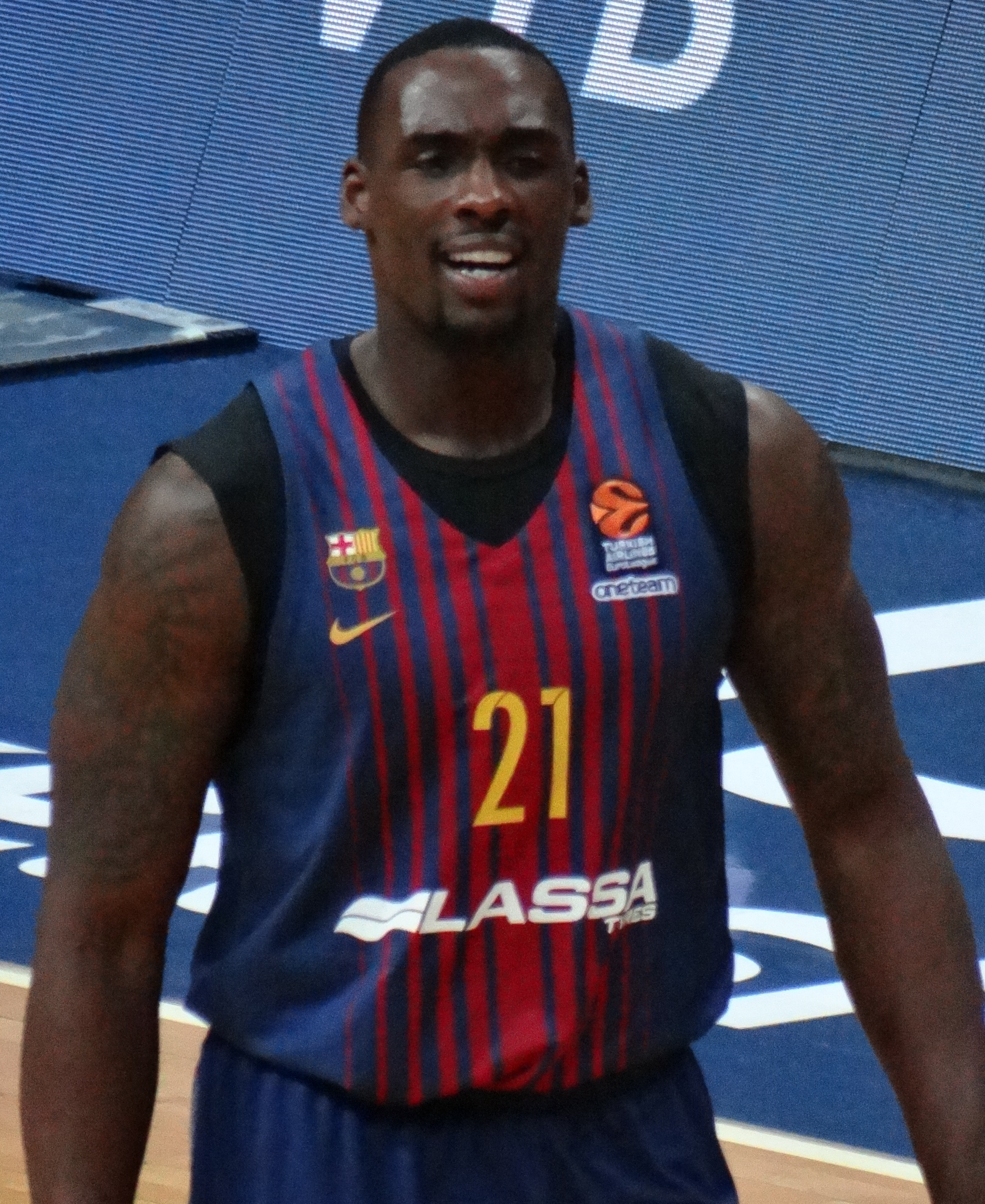
- Sanders with FC Barcelona in 2018

Personal information
- Born: July 8, 1989 (age 37) Pawtucket, Rhode Island, U.S.
- Listed height: 6 ft 5 in (1.96 m)
- Listed weight: 234 lb (106 kg)

Career information
- High school: St. Andrew's (Barrington, Rhode Island)
- College: Boston College (2007–2010); Fairfield (2011–2012)
- NBA draft: 2012: undrafted
- Playing career: 2012–2020
- Position: Small forward / shooting guard
- Number: 21, 15, 7, 20

Career history
- 2012–2013: Maccabi Tel Aviv
- 2012–2013: →Hapoel Gilboa Galil
- 2013–2014: Brose Baskets
- 2014–2015: Dinamo Sassari
- 2015–2017: Olimpia Milano
- 2017–2018: FC Barcelona
- 2019: Erie BayHawks
- 2020: Changwon LG Sakers

Career highlights
- 2× Italian League champion (2015, 2016); 2× Italian League Finals MVP (2015, 2016); 2× Italian Cup winner (2015, 2016); Italian Cup MVP (2016); 2× Italian Supercup winner (2014, 2016); Balkan League champion (2013); First-team All-MAAC (2012)
- Stats at Basketball Reference

Rakim Sanders (born July 8, 1989) is an American former professional basketball player. He played college basketball with the Boston College Eagles for three seasons, and with the Fairfield Stags, for one season. At a height of 1.96 m (6 ft 5 in) tall, he played at both the shooting guard and small forward positions, with small forward being his main position.

== High school career ==
Born in Pawtucket, Rhode Island, Sanders attended St. Andrew's High School. He was the 2006–07 Gatorade Player of the Year for Rhode Island. In his junior year, he averaged 18.4 points and 5.9 rebounds per game while earning a spot of the all-state first team. He followed this up with another all-state first team spot his senior year, averaging 21.3 points per game and 8.3 rebounds per game while shooting 53 percent from the field. Sanders finished his high school career with 2,432 points.

== College career ==
=== Freshman season ===
Sanders played right away for the Eagles, playing 28 minutes per game. He averaged 11.3 point, 4.6 rebounds, and 1 steal per game. Sanders struggled at the free throw line, hitting just 46% of his shots. However, he did have his most successful year from beyond the arc, hitting 38% of his threes. On February 14, Sanders had his first double-double, scoring 14 points and adding 12 rebounds against North Carolina State. The Eagles went 14–17, despite winning 10 of their first twelve games.

=== Sophomore season ===
In his sophomore year, Sanders started at small forward alongside BC stars Reggie Jackson and Tyrese Rice. It was the team's most successful year during Sanders' time at BC. The team went 22–12 (9–7 in ACC play), and lost in the first round of the NCAA Tournament to USC. The season was highlighted by an 85–78 win over a North Carolina Tar Heels team that was ranked first in the country and would go on to win that season's National Championship. Sanders had 22 points, 2 blocks, and a game-high 7 steals. Sanders hit two game winning shots for Boston college; one against Virginia Tech and one against Georgia Tech. Sanders had his best year in terms of scoring at BC, averaging 12.9 points per game to go along with 4.4 rebounds per game and 1.6 steals per game. He shared the team's defensive player of the year with forward Corey Raji.

=== Junior season ===
The BC team was hit hard by the graduation of Tyrese Rice entering Sanders' junior year. As a result, the team struggled despite the efforts of Sanders, Jackson, and Raji, finishing 15–16. Sanders averaged 11.3 points, 3.7 rebounds, and 1 steal per game. He elected to transfer at the end of the season following the departure of head coach Al Skinner. Bleacher Report called Sanders "arguably the best player on the Eagles' roster."

=== Senior season ===
Sanders was forced to sit out for a season before playing for Fairfield. He had high expectations entering the year. College Basketball expert Andy Katz said that Sanders had a high chance of making the Wooden Award watchlist. In one season with the Stags, Sanders averaged 16.6 points per game, 8.2 rebounds per game, and 1.4 steals per game. At Fairfield, Sanders gained a reputation as a high I.Q. player. Fairfield coach Sydney Johnson said "[Sanders] plays the game almost like a coach would in terms of how he's trying to put all the pieces together. He's consciously aware of the bigger picture on offense and defense." Sanders eventually led the Stags to the CIT semifinals. he led the team in points and rebounding, while earning first team All Metro Atlantic Athletic Conference and was also named to the All-Jesuit team, honoring the best players from 28 Jesuit universities. His point total of 615 was the second highest in school history, and he also became the first player in school history to score 600 points and grab 300 rebounds in one season. Following the season, Sanders was invited to the Portsmouth Invitational Tournament, where he was named to the all-tournament team, averaging 19.3 points and 8.7 rebounds per game.

== Professional career ==
=== NBA draft ===
In the 2012 NBA draft, Sanders went undrafted. However, he was signed to play for the Golden State Warriors' Summer League Team.

=== Israel ===
After failing to catch on with an NBA team, Sanders signed a deal with Maccabi Tel Aviv, who loaned him out to Hapoel Gilboa Galil. In 29 Israeli Premier League games, he averaged 12.6 points, 4.0 rebounds, 1.7 assists, and 1.3 steals per game, while shooting 59.5% on two point field goals and 38.2% on threes. Also, in 15 games in Balkan International Basketball League play, he averaged 13.3 points, 6.3 rebounds, 1.6 assists, and 1.3 steals per game.

=== Brose Baskets ===
On August 13, 2013, Sanders signed a two-year contract with the German League team Brose Baskets.

=== Olimpia Milano ===
On November 16, 2015, he signed a contract with Olimpia Milano, and was cleared to play by January, as he was recovering from a wrist injury. He averaged 12.5 points, 3.5 rebounds, 1.2 assists and 1.1 steals per game.

=== FC Barcelona ===
On July 10, 2017, Sanders signed with FC Barcelona.

=== Erie BayHawks ===
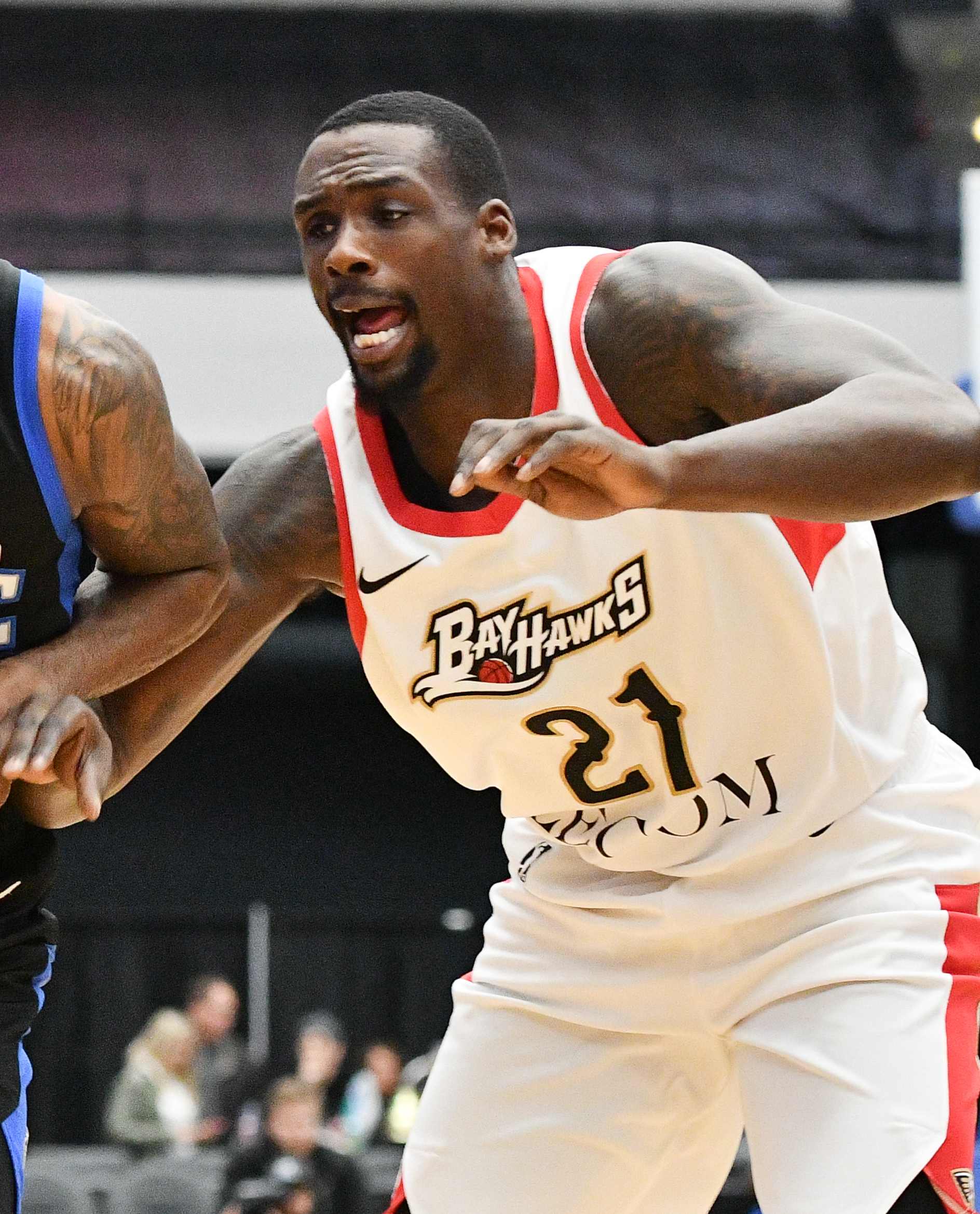
Sanders in 2019

For the 2019–20 season, Sanders joined the Erie BayHawks of the G League as a local tryout player. He averaged 5.2 points and 3.5 rebounds per game.

=== Changwon LG Sakers ===
Sanders signed with Changwon LG Sakers of the Korean league on January 14, 2020.

On July 21, 2020, he has signed with Hapoel Be'er Sheva of the Israeli Premier League. However, Sanders opted out of his contract on August 25 due to personal issues.

== Career statistics ==
Legend
GP	Games played	GS	Games started	MPG	Minutes per game
FG%	Field-goal percentage	3P%	3-point field-goal percentage	FT%	Free-throw percentage
RPG	Rebounds per game	APG	Assists per game	SPG	Steals per game
BPG	Blocks per game	PPG	Points per game	PIR	Performance index rating
**Bold**	Career high

=== EuroLeague ===
Year	Team	GP	GS	MPG	FG%	3P%	FT%	RPG	APG	SPG	BPG	PPG	PIR
2013–14	Brose	10	2	17.5	**.500**	**.450**	.667	3.2	.4	.8	.1	7.9	6.6
2014–15	Sassari	8	7	**27.6**	.406	.326	.625	3.0	.5	.9	.0	**13.4**	6.8
2016–17	Milano	**24**	**11**	22.8	.477	.406	.667	**3.5**	**1.2**	1.1	.2	12.5	**10.4**
2017–18	Barcelona	15	8	20.2	.421	.333	**.786**	3.1	.9	**1.5**	**.3**	8.9	7.5
Career		57	28	21.9	.454	.377	.674	3.3	.9	1.1	.2	10.9	8.5
