= 2015 Italian Basketball Cup =

Italian Basketball Cup
- Duration: 20 – 22 February 2015
- Games played: 7
- Teams: 8

Regular season
- Season MVP: (Poland) David Logan

Finals
- Champions: Dinamo Banco di Sardegna Sassari (2nd title)
- Runners-up: EA7 Emporio Armani Milano
- Semi-finalists: Enel Brindisi; Grissin Bon Reggio Emilia

The 2015 Italian Basketball Cup, known as the Beko Final Eight for sponsorship reasons, was the 47th edition of the Italian Basketball Cup, the cup competition organised by Lega Basket for Lega Basket Serie A club. The tournament was held from 20 to 22 February at the PalaDesio in Desio.

Dinamo Banco di Sardegna Sassari won its second successive title by beating EA7 Emporio Armani Milano 101–94 in the final. David Logan was named the Cup final MVP.

== Participants ==
Eight teams qualified for the final eight as the best ranked teams at the end of the first stage of the 2014-15 Serie A.

1. EA7 Emporio Armani Milano
2. Dinamo Banco di Sardegna Sassari
3. Grissin Bon Reggio Emilia
4. Umana Reyer Venezia
5. Enel Brindisi
6. Dolomiti Energia Trento
7. Vanoli Cremona
8. Sidigas Avellino

== Road to the final ==
In the quarterfinals, Milano earned a close 68-60 win over Avellino on the back of Samardo Samuels' 19 points and 12 rebounds, Reggio Emilia edged Dolomiti Energia Trento 80-77 with 16 points and 9 assists from Andrea Cinciarini, Brindisi downed Venezia 80-70 thanks to 27 points (on 6-of-8 three point shooting) from Jacob Pullen whilst holders Sassari bested Cremona 74-63 with contributions from Édgar Sosa (14 points and 4 assists) and Jeff Brooks (11 points and 7 rebounds).

The semifinals saw Milano undo Brindisi 76-65, having led the first quarter 24-4 before a Brindisi upsurge in the next quarter conceded the lead, Milano retook it before half-time and resisted Brindisi's forays until the end, Marshon Brooks' 14 points made him one of five Milan players with 10 points or more. In the other contest, Sassari progressed past Reggio Emilia thanks to a third quarter run that took the game from a tie to a 57-46 Sassari lead, with Reggio Emilia not finding a way back into the game despite Rimantas Kaukėnas' 21 points, the winners had a number of players in double figure scoring including David Logan and Jerome Dyson (16 and 15 points respectively).

== Bracket ==
Quarter-finals
1	EA7 Emporio Armani Milano	60
8	Sidigas Avellino	58
4	Umana Reyer Venezia	70
5	Enel Brindisi	80
3	Grissin Bon Reggio Emilia	80
6	Dolomiti Energia Trento	77
2	Dinamo Banco di Sardegna Sassari	74
7	Vanoli Cremona	63

Semifinals
1	EA7 Emporio Armani Milano	76
5	Enel Brindisi	65
3	Grissin Bon Reggio Emilia	65
2	Dinamo Banco di Sardegna Sassari	77

Final
1	EA7 Emporio Armani Milano	94
2	Dinamo Banco di Sardegna Sassari	101

== Final ==
Milano were seen as the favourites going into the final against defending champions Sassari, however it was the Sardinians that raced into a 33-15 lead after only eight minutes, league-leaders Milano fought back to reduce the lead to 49-47 before half-time but an excellent start to the third quarter enabled Sassari to accrue a determinant lead and repeat their 2014 Cup win. Game MVP Logan had 25 points as Dyson paced the winners with 27 points, Joe Ragland and Brooks contributed 21 and 18 points respectively to Milano's losing effort.

22 February 2015
19:00 UTC+1

Boxscore

EA7 Emporio Armani Milano	94–101	Dinamo Banco di Sardegna Sassari
Scoring by quarter: 21–33, 26–18, 19–26, 28–24
Pts: Ragland 21; Rebs: Kleiza, Hacket 9 Asts: Hackett 6		Pts: Dyson 27; Rebs: Sanders 7 Asts: Sosa 4

PalaDesio, Desio
Referees:
- Luigi Lamonica
- Guido Federico Di Francesco
- Gianluca Sardella

Milano	Sassari

MVP
(Poland) David Logan
Game rules
Game played under FIBA rules.

2015 Italian Cup Winners
Dinamo Banco di Sardegna Sassari
(1st title)
