= 2017–18 French Basketball Cup =

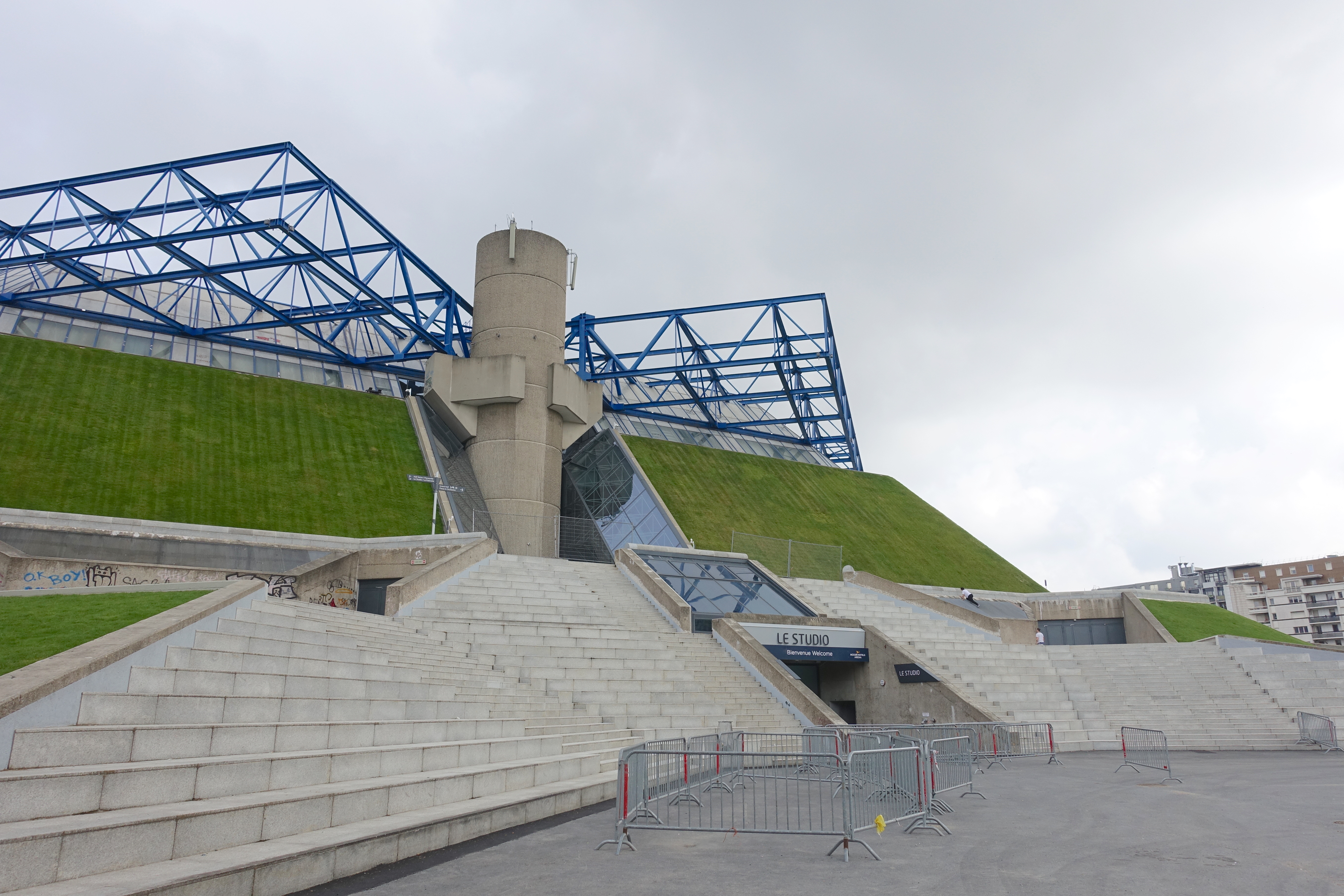
- The Final was played at the AccorHotels Arena
- Season: 2017–18
- Duration: 19 September 2017 – 21 April 2018
- Teams: 28 (preliminary round); 64 (competition proper)

Finals
- Champions: SIG Strasbourg
- Runners-up: Boulazac

Awards
- Final MVP: (United States) David Logan

The 2017–18 French Basketball Cup season (French: 2017–18 Coupe de France de Basket) was the 41st season of the domestic cup competition of French basketball. The competition started on 19 September 2017 and ended 21 April 2018. SIG Strasbourg won its second Cup title.

== Bracket ==
Round of 16; 13 February
Boulazac	100
Élan Chalon	96
Monaco	81
Hyères-Toulon Var	65
Orléans Loiret	82
Champagne Châlons Reims	77
SOMB	65
Levallois Metropolitans	86
SVBD	60
Denain Voltaire	72
Nanterre 92	86
ESSM Le Portel	75
ADA Blois 41	62
ASVEL	70
SIG Strasbourg	93
JL Bourg	64

Quarterfinals; 14 March
Boulazac	86
Monaco	63
Orléans Loiret	71
Levallois Metropolitans	75
Denain Voltaire	66
Nanterre 92	79
ASVEL	79
SIG Strasbourg	93

Semifinals; 25 March
Boulazac	79
Levallois Metropolitans	66
Nanterre 92	71
SIG Strasbourg	79

Final; 21 April
Boulazac	62
SIG Strasbourg	82

== Final ==
21 April 2018	SIG Strasbourg	82–62	Boulazac	Paris
19:00 (CET)	Scoring by quarter: 16–23, 24–8, 20–20, 22–11
	Pts: Logan 21; Rebs: Labeyrie 11; Asts: Bost 10	Boxscore	Pts: Oniangue 13; Rebs: James 7 Asts: Meacham 6	Arena: AccorHotels Arena

== See also ==
- 2017–18 Pro A season
- 2017–18 Pro B season
