= David Logan (basketball) =

American-Polish basketball player

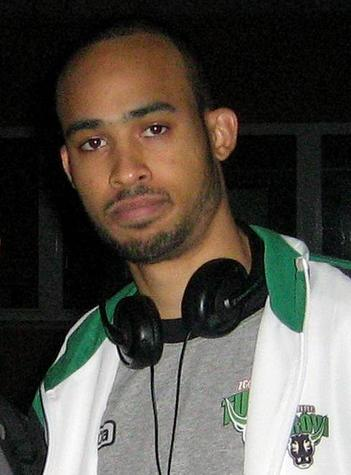
- Logan in 2007

Personal information
- Born: December 26, 1982 (age 43) Chicago, Illinois, U.S.
- Listed height: 1.85 m (6 ft 1 in)
- Listed weight: 77 kg (170 lb)

Career information
- High school: North Central (Indianapolis, Indiana)
- College: Indianapolis (2001–2005)
- NBA draft: 2005: undrafted
- Playing career: 2005–2024
- Position: Point guard / shooting guard

Career history
- 2005: Edimes Pavia
- 2005–2006: Hapoel Ramat HaSharon
- 2006–2007: Fort Worth Flyers
- 2007: SKS Starogard
- 2007–2008: Turow Zgorzelec
- 2008–2010: Asseco Prokom
- 2010–2011: Caja Laboral
- 2011–2012: Panathinaikos
- 2012–2013: Maccabi Tel Aviv
- 2013–2014: Alba Berlin
- 2014–2016: Dinamo Sassari
- 2016–2017: Lietuvos rytas Vilnius
- 2017: Sidigas Avellino
- 2017–2018: SIG Strasbourg
- 2018: Busan KT Sonicboom
- 2019–2021: Universo Treviso Basket
- 2021–2022: Dinamo Sassari
- 2022–2024: Scafati Basket

Career highlights
- EuroLeague steals leader (2009); Italian Cup winner (2015); French Cup winner (2018); LKL Top Scorer (2017); Polish League MVP (2008); Polish League Finals MVP (2010); Israeli Supercup MVP (2012); Italian Cup MVP (2015); French Cup MVP (2018); Italian Serie A2 Playoff MVP (2019); NCAA Division II Player of the Year (2005); GLVC Player of the Year (2005); 2× First-team All-GLVC (2004, 2005)

David Kyle Logan (born December 26, 1982) is an American–born naturalized Polish former professional basketball player. He played college basketball for the University of Indianapolis before playing professionally in Europe, Israel, South Korea and the NBA G League.

== High school and college career ==
Logan attended North Central High School in Indianapolis, Indiana.

Logan led US college basketball in scoring, averaging 28.6 points per game in his senior year at the University of Indianapolis. His performances earned him the NCAA Division II Player of the Year Award. He finished his collegiate career as the all-time leading scorer in Indianapolis with 2,352 points.

== Professional career ==
Logan signed for the 2005–06 season with the Italian second division club Pallacanestro Pavia. In December 2005 he moved to Israel and signed with Hapoel MB9 Ramat Hasharon, playing under Miki Berkowitz. Logan averaged 15.4 points in 22 games.

After that he went back to the US and played seven games for the Fort Worth Flyers in the NBDL. He finished the 2006–07 season playing for SKS Starogard in Poland.

In the 2007–08 season, Logan signed with Turow Zgorzelec and took part in the EuroCup, where he averaged 18.6 points per game and reached the Final Eight. His play was rewarded by a transfer to Polish powerhouse Asseco Prokom and a participation in the EuroLeague. He contributed a lot to his team's sixth straight national championship Asseco Prokom .

On July 2, 2010, he signed a contract with Spanish powerhouse Caja Laboral.

In August 2011 he signed a two-year deal with Panathinaikos in Greece.

In July 2012 he signed a two-year deal with Maccabi Tel Aviv of the Israeli Super League. In July 2013, he left the team and became a free agent.

In July 2013 he signed a one-year deal with the German EuroCup club, Alba Berlin.

On July 5, 2014, he signed with Italian team Dinamo Banco di Sardegna Sassari, also playing in the European top-tier EuroLeague. The next year, his contract was extended for another year.

On July 22, 2016, Logan signed with Lithuanian team Lietuvos rytas Vilnius.

On February 16, 2017, Sidigas Avellino confirmed that team bought Logan from Lietuvos rytas and signed a contract until the end of the season.

On July 22, 2017, Logan signed with French club Strasbourg IG.

On February 9, 2019, Logan signed a deal with De' Longhi Treviso in the Italian Serie A2. In the same year, Treviso achieved the promotion to LBA as the A2 Playoff winners. David Logan was named MVP of the Playoff Finals.

On July 12, 2021, Logan returned to Sassari for the season 2021–2022.

On October 13, 2022, he signed with Scafati Basket of the Lega Basket Serie A (LBA).

On February 1, 2024, Logan announced his retirement from professional basketball.

== International career ==
In late February 2009, Logan became a Polish citizen, the same summer he played with Poland at EuroBasket 2009. He averaged 15.5 Points and 4.5 assists per game at the tournament.

== Career statistics ==
Legend
GP	Games played	GS	Games started	MPG	Minutes per game
FG%	Field-goal percentage	3P%	3-point field-goal percentage	FT%	Free-throw percentage
RPG	Rebounds per game	APG	Assists per game	SPG	Steals per game
BPG	Blocks per game	PPG	Points per game	PIR	Performance index rating
**Bold**	Career high

=== EuroLeague ===
*	Led the league

Year	Team	GP	GS	MPG	FG%	3P%	FT%	RPG	APG	SPG	BPG	PPG	PIR
2008–09	Gdynia	15	15	34.3*	.402	.337	**.786**	**2.7**	2.7	**2.7***	**.3**	**16.9**	**13.5**
2009–10	Gdynia	20	**20**	**36.3***	.453	.331	.625	2.6	**3.4**	1.6	.2	15.3	13.1
2010–11	Baskonia	19	11	22.9	.415	.398	.735	1.6	2.4	.8	.1	10.0	8.6
2011–12	Panathinaikos	21	5	15.0	.437	.317	.706	.9	1.0	1.0	.1	6.5	4.7
2012–13	Maccabi	**27**	0	24.9	**.493**	**.434**	.640	2.3	1.2	1.1	**.3**	10.6	10.0
2014–15	Sassari	10	9	29.1	.350	.333	.692	2.1	2.8	2.3	—	11.9	8.5
2015–16	Sassari	8	8	27.5	.352	.296	.846	1.3	2.9	2.0	.1	11.4	7.9
Career		120	68	26.5	.425	.360	.705	2.0	2.2	1.5	.2	11.5	9.5

== Awards and accomplishments ==
=== Individual ===
(Italy) De' Longhi Treviso

- Italian Serie A2 Playoff MVP (1): 2019

(Poland) Turów Zgorzelec

- PLK Most Valuable Player (1): 2007–08

(Italy) Dinamo Sassari

- Italian Cup MVP (1): 2015

(United States) Indianapolis (College)

- NCAA Division II Player of the Year (1): 2005

=== Club ===
(Poland) Asseco Prokom

- Polish Basketball League (2): 2008–09, 2009–10

(Greece) Panathinaikos B.C.

- Greek Cup (1): 2011–12

(Israel) Maccabi Tel Aviv

- Israeli State Cup (1): 2012–13

(Italy) Dinamo Sassari

- Italian Cup (1): 2015
- Italian Super Cup (1): 2014
- Serie A Championship (1): 2014–15

(Italy) De' Longhi Treviso

- Serie A2 Championship (1): 2018–19
