= 2014–15 Lega Basket Serie A =

Lega Basket Serie A
- Season: 2014–15
- Duration: 12 October 2014 – 26 June 2015
- Teams: 16

Regular season
- Top seed: EA7 Emporio Armani Milano
- Season MVP: (United States) Tony Mitchell
- Relegated: Pasta Reggia Caserta

Finals
- Champions: Banco di Sardegna Sassari; 1st title
- Runners-up: Grissin Bon Reggio Emilia
- Semi-finalists: EA7 Emporio Armani Milano; Umana Reyer Venezia
- Finals MVP: (United States) Rakim Sanders

Awards
- Best Young Player: (Italy) Simone Fontecchio
- Best Coach: (Italy) Maurizio Buscaglia

Statistical leaders
Points	(United States) Tony Mitchell	20.7
Rebounds	(United States) O. D. Anosike	10.9
Assists	(Italy) Andrea Cinciarini	6.2
Index Rating	(Italy) Luca Vitali	19.4

The 2014–15 Lega Basket Serie A was the 93rd season of the Lega Basket Serie A, the highest professional basketball league in Italy.

The regular season started on 12 October 2014 and finished on 10 May 2015, after all teams had played 30 games each. The eight best ranked teams advanced to the play-off phase whilst Pasta Reggia Caserta was relegated to the Serie A2 after finishing last in the league table.

The play-offs started on 18 May 2015 and finished on 26 June 2015, Banco di Sardegna Sassari won their first title by beating Grissin Bon Reggio Emilia in game 7 of the finals.

== Teams ==
Lega Basket 2014–15 – Club Locations

Team	City	Arena	Capacity
Acea Roma	Rome	Palazzetto dello Sport	3,500
Acqua Vitasnella Cantù	Cantù	Palasport Pianella	3,910
Banco di Sardegna Sassari	Sassari	Palasport Roberta Serradimigni	5,000
Consultinvest Pesaro	Pesaro	Adriatic Arena	6,119
Dolomiti Energia Trento	Trento	PalaTrento	4,360
EA7 Emporio Armani Milano	Milan	Mediolanum Forum	11,210
Enel Brindisi	Brindisi	PalaPentassuglia	3,534
Giorgio Tesi Group Pistoia	Pistoia	PallaCarrara	4,000
Granarolo Bologna	Bologna	Unipol Arena	9,200
Grissin Bon Reggio Emilia	Reggio Emilia	PalaBigi	3,500
Openjobmetis Varese	Varese	PalaWhirlpool	5,100
Pasta Reggia Caserta	Caserta	PalaMaggiò	6,387
Sidigas Avellino	Avellino	Palasport Del Mauro	5,195
Umana Reyer Venezia	Venezia	Palasport Taliercio	3,509
Upea Capo d'Orlando	Capo d'Orlando	PalaFantozzi	3,613
Vanoli Cremona	Cremona	Palasport Mario Radi	3,527

== Season narrative ==
=== Supercup ===
The Italian Supercup opened the season on October 4 and 5 at Sassari's PalaSerradimigni, in a final four format. The previous year's League and cup runners-up Montepaschi Siena (also defending champions) did not participate after declaring bankruptcy over the summer. League champions EA7 Emporio Armani Milano comfortably dispatched Enel Brindisi (third in the 2014 cup) 71–59 in the first semifinal on the back of Linas Kleiza's and Joe Ragland's long-distance shooting (17 and 16 points respectively) in a mistake-strewn game. The other semifinal saw cup-holders Banco di Sardegna Sassari have an easy 89–73 win over Acea Roma (league semifinalist), with the hosts always leading and coach Romeo Sacchetti rotating his squad.

The final saw Sassari add a second title to their prior cup win, downing Milano 96–88. The Sardinians started the game on the front foot, leading the first quarter 29-14 while Milano struggled to score (0-for-6 from three). They continued to drive the game at the start of the second quarter but Milano found a way back into the game thanks to stronger defense and a stellar MarShon Brooks to answer with a 15–0 run from 36-18 down, with Sassari then finding their scoring shoes to finish the half 50–40. Three's from Ragland and Kleiza helped Milano claw back at the lead but Brooks missed the shot to equalise, with the quarter ending on 72–68. Sassari would stay in front for the rest of the game, with Supercup MVP Jerome Dyson entertaining the fans. Brooks led all scorers with 26 points, followed for Milano by Ragland (17) and Kleizia (16) whilst Dyson paced the winners with 25 and three other players had 14 points.

=== All Star Game ===
The All Star Game was played on 17 January 2015 in Verona's PalaOlimpia, players from EA7 Emporio Armani Milano were absent as the club was involved in Euroleague games at the same period. An entertaining defense-free game between Dolomiti Energia and Named Sport sponsored squads finished 146-143 for the latter, with a token appearance by former star player and Named Sport coach Gianmarco Pozzecco at the end of the game. Christian Eyenga was named game MVP whilst Andy Rautins won the three-point contest and the pair of Tony Mitchell and Kader Kam (from freestyle group Da Move) won the dunk contest.

=== Cup ===
The Italian Cup was held from 20 to 22 February at the PalaDesio in Desio. Banco di Sardegna Sassari won its second successive title by beating EA7 Emporio Armani Milano 101–94 in the final. David Logan was named the Cup final MVP.

=== Playoffs ===
Banco di Sardegna Sassari surprised regular season leaders and competition favourites EA7 Emporio Armani Milano in a semifinal game 7 overtime victory to reach the finals for a historic first time.

==== Finals ====
Having won the decisive game 6 after three overtimes, Banco di Sardegna Sassari overcame hosts Grissin Bon Reggio Emilia 73-75 during game 7 at the PalaBigi to win their first ever Serie A title. Sassari's Jerome Dyson's was named Finals MVP.

== Regular season ==
=== Standings ===
Pos	Team	Pld	W	L	PF	PA	PR	Pts	Qualification or relegation
1	EA7 Emporio Armani Milano	30	26	4	2584	2202	1.173	52	Qualification to playoffs
2	Umana Reyer Venezia	30	22	8	2400	2221	1.081	44	Qualification to playoffs
3	Grissin Bon Reggio Emilia	30	21	9	2317	2219	1.044	42	Qualification to playoffs
4	Dolomiti Energia Trento	30	19	11	2440	2402	1.016	38	Qualification to playoffs
5	Banco di Sardegna Sassari	30	19	11	2549	2435	1.047	38	Qualification to playoffs
6	Enel Brindisi	30	16	14	2280	2231	1.022	32	Qualification to playoffs
7	Acqua Vitasnella Cantù	30	15	15	2389	2354	1.015	30	Qualification to playoffs
8	Granarolo Bologna (Note: 2 points deducted to Bologna for tax and social security contributions payment arrears.)	30	15	15	2331	2416	0.965	28	Qualification to playoffs
9	Giorgio Tesi Group Pistoia	30	13	17	2307	2332	0.989	26	
10	Acea Roma	30	12	18	2143	2210	0.970	24	
11	Openjobmetis Varese	30	12	18	2418	2475	0.977	24	
12	Vanoli Cremona	30	12	18	2308	2348	0.983	24	
13	Sidigas Avellino	30	12	18	2283	2341	0.975	24	
14	Upea Capo d'Orlando	30	10	20	2094	2222	0.942	20	
15	Consultinvest Pesaro	30	8	22	2169	2463	0.881	16	
16	Pasta Reggia Caserta (Note: 1 point deducted to Caserta for income tax payment arrears.)	30	8	22	2253	2394	0.941	15	Relegation to Serie A2 Gold

Updated to match(es) played on 10 May 2015. Source: Legabasket

=== Results ===
Home \ Away	AVE	BOL	BRI	CAN	CAP	CAS	CRE	MIL	PES	PIS	REG	ROM	SAS	TRE	VAR	VEN
Sidigas Avellino		96–79	77–80	76–79	65–75	70–74	84–79	73–69	69–60	73–69	88–94	74–70	70–83	84–72	67–91	71–76
Granarolo Bologna	77–78		75–68	108–76	74–69	79–73	70–83	58–81	89–85	90–67	78–66	90–77	80–75	88–78	86–78	79–83
Enel Brindisi	81–67	75–64		76–75	78–73	60–72	81–65	73–85	92–56	89–77	56–79	84–54	76–74	82–74	69–71	74–81
Acqua Vitasnella Cantù	74–65	89–67	63–73		93–67	83–72	79–76	83–64	83–67	76–80	64–63	60–70	79–75	110–84	91–83	73–77
Upea Capo d'Orlando	67–81	63–72	66–65	79–71		68–64	57–74	71–57	69–70	71–74	67–73	70–73	72–71	67–68	84–71	67–54
Pasta Reggia Caserta	91–105	81–76	69–78	95–107	70–83		66–81	78–82	80–73	59–63	75–65	54–53	94–87	88–90	78–82	84–73
Vanoli Cremona	88–81	81–76	87–72	71–63	76–78	81–77		61–67	73–80	75–81	87–88	71–74	87–99	77–82	64–53	84–91
EA7 Emporio Armani Milano	95–78	117–92	77–68	83–64	98–69	78–71	94–61		96–61	78–77	118–68	77–56	97–80	90–75	79–69	80–71
Consultinvest Pesaro	62–77	67–70	93–101	83–103	62–60	80–70	74–89	61–84		82–86	75–74	89–87	71–75	57–76	85–96	89–90
Giorgio Tesi Group Pistoia	61–68	72–73	70–83	88–87	94–73	87–76	76–83	73–79	84–53		92–78	94–84	81–84	86–69	87–103	82–90
Grissin Bon Reggio Emilia	96–72	66–56	67–63	86–74	77–65	95–74	69–70	77–76	91–73	71–59		87–83	74–66	63–58	86–70	70–67
Acea Roma	81–72	90–84	80–58	75–78	67–63	75–62	63–50	68–79	76–80	70–63	66–56		75–84	68–75	87–78	62–72
Banco di Sardegna Sassari	81–75	89–76	87–78	86–69	70–68	95–84	88–82	111–112	92–64	96–78	87–74	72–61		84–92	71–79	88–80
Dolomiti Energia Trento	92–85	96–81	95–83	83–71	90–73	73–66	116–114	84–102	77–65	86–72	69–78	82–68	104–82		78–65	66–93
Openjobmetis Varese	66–73	83–73	82–93	93–84	80–73	84–80	86–82	97–105	70–80	67–71	112–118	78–73	113–117	70–76		53–67
Umana Reyer Venezia	79–71	96–71	76–71	80–68	90–67	88–76	82–56	74–84	84–72	66–63	59–68	74–57	90–100	90–80	98–95	

Legend: Blue = home team win; Yellow = draw; Red = away team win.

=== Statistical leaders ===
==== Points ====
Rank	Name	Team	PPG
1.	(United States) Tony Mitchell	Dolomiti Energia Trento	20.7
2.	(United States) Allan Ray	Granarolo Bologna	17.2
3.	(United States) LaQuinton Ross	Consultinvest Pesaro	17.1
4.	(Poland) David Logan	Banco di Sardegna Sassari	16.8
5.	(United States) Jerome Dyson	Banco di Sardegna Sassari	16.2

=== Assists ===
Rank	Name	Team	APG
1.	(Italy) Andrea Cinciarini	Grissin Bon Reggio Emilia	6.2
2.	(Italy) Luca Vitali	Vanoli Cremona	5.7
3.	(United States) Ronald Moore	Pasta Reggia Caserta	5.2
4.	(United States) Langston Hall	Giorgio Tesi Group Pistoia	5.1
5.	(United States) Jerome Dyson	Banco di Sardegna Sassari	4.3

=== Steals ===
Rank	Name	Team	SPG
1.	(United States) Jerome Dyson	Banco di Sardegna Sassari	2.0
2.	(Hungary) Ádám Hanga	Sidigas Avellino	1.9
3.	(United States) Ronald Moore	Pasta Reggia Caserta	1.7
4.	(Poland) David Logan	Banco di Sardegna Sassari	1.6
5.	(Equatorial Guinea) (United States) Bobby Jones	Acea Virtus Roma	1.5

=== Rebounds ===
Rank	Name	Team	RPG
1.	(Nigeria) (United States) O. D. Anosike	Sidigas Avellino	10.9
2.	(Central African Republic) James Mays	Enel Brindisi	9.4
3.	(Nigeria) Shane Lawal	Banco di Sardegna Sassari	9.2
4.	(United States) Dario Hunt	Upea Capo d'Orlando	8.5
5.	(Italy) Achille Polonara	Grissin Bon Reggio Emilia	8.4

=== Blocks ===
Rank	Name	Team	BPG
1.	(Nigeria) Shane Lawal	Banco di Sardegna Sassari	2.0
2.	(Italy) Riccardo Cervi	Grissin Bon Reggio Emilia	1.8
3.	(Italy) Marco Cusin	Vanoli Cremona	1.2
4.	(Guyana) (United States) Delroy James	Enel Brindisi	1.1
5.	(United States) Dario Hunt	Upea Capo d'Orlando	1.1

=== Valuation ===
Rank	Name	Team	VPG
1.	(Italy) Luca Vitali	Vanoli Cremona	19.4
2.	(Nigeria) Shane Lawal	Banco di Sardegna Sassari	18.7
3.	(Bulgaria) Dejan Ivanov	Pasta Reggia Caserta	18.3
4.	(Central African Republic) James Mays	Enel Brindisi	18.2
5.	(Italy) Achille Polonara	Grissin Bon Reggio Emilia	18.1

== Playoffs ==
Quarterfinals
1	EA7 Emporio Armani Milano	3
8	Granarolo Bologna	0
4	Dolomiti Energia Trento	1
5	Banco di Sardegna Sassari	3
2	Umana Reyer Venezia	3
7	Acqua Vitasnella Cantu	2
3	Grissin Bon Reggio Emilia	3
6	Enel Brindisi	2

Semifinals
1	EA7 Emporio Armani Milano	3
5	Banco di Sardegna Sassari	4
2	Umana Reyer Venezia	3
3	Grissin Bon Reggio Emilia	4

Finals
5	Banco di Sardegna Sassari	4
3	Grissin Bon Reggio Emilia	3

== Awards ==
- Most Valuable Player:

(United States) Tony Mitchell (Dolomiti Energia Trento)

- Coach of the year:

(Italy) Maurizio Buscaglia (Dolomiti Energia Trento)

- Best player under 22:

(Italy) Simone Fontecchio (Granarolo Bologna)

- Executive of the year:

(Italy) Salvatore Trainotti (Dolomiti Energia Trento)

- Finals MVP:

(United States) Rakim Sanders (Banco di Sardegna Sassari)
