= Vitalis Chikoko =

Zimbabwean basketball player (born 1991)

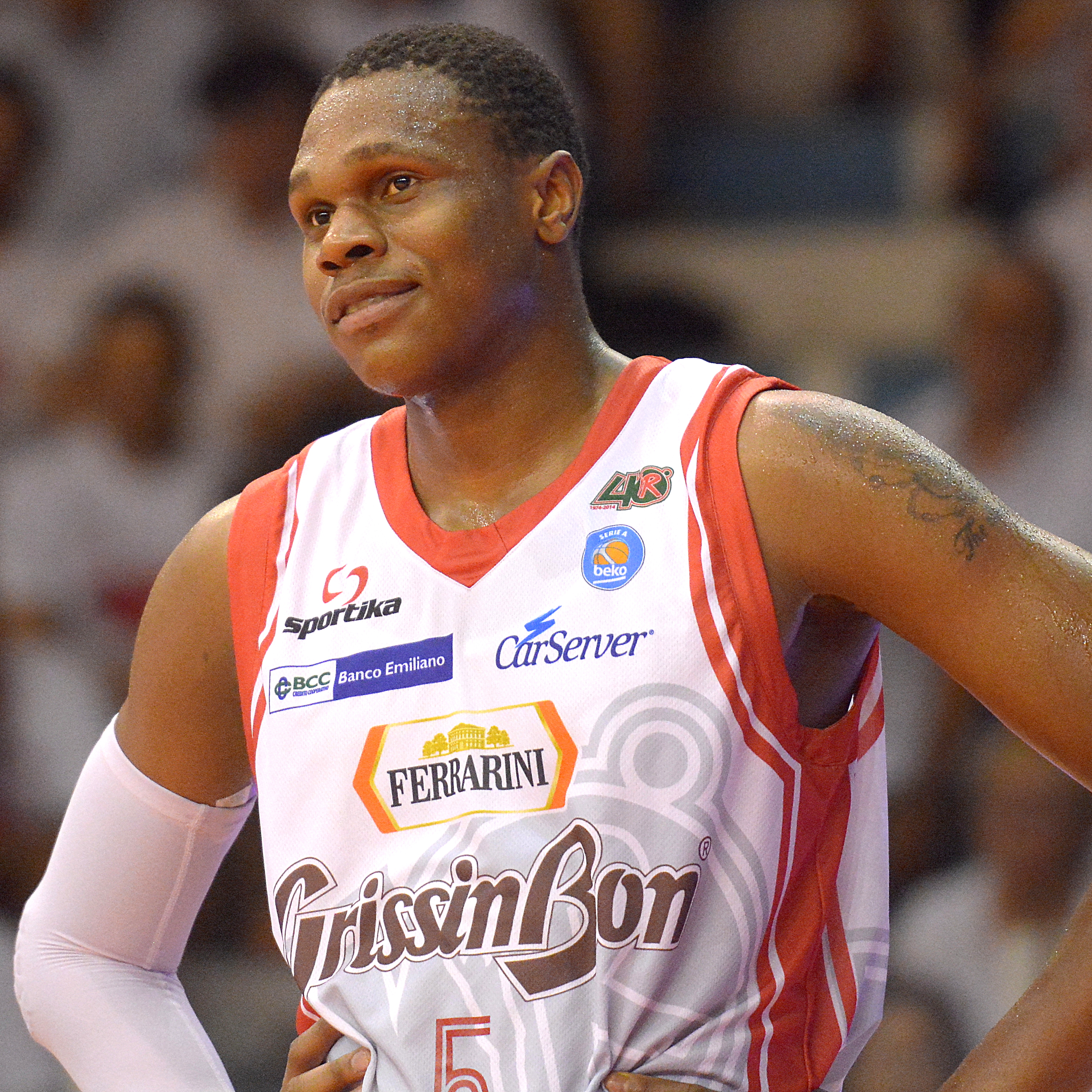
- Chikoko with Pallacanestro Reggiana in 2015

Free Agent
- Position: Center

Personal information
- Born: 11 February 1991 (age 35) Harare, Zimbabwe
- Listed height: 6 ft 10 in (2.08 m)
- Listed weight: 250 lb (113 kg)

Career information
- NBA draft: 2013: undrafted
- Playing career: 2011–present

Career history
- 2010–2011: Mbare Heat
- 2011: ASC Göttingen
- 2011–2012: BG Göttingen
- 2012–2015: TBB Trier
- 2015: Pallacanestro Reggiana
- 2015–2016: Tenezis Verona
- 2016: Bayern Munich
- 2016–2019: Élan Béarnais Pau-Orthez
- 2019–2021: Metropolitans 92
- 2021–2023: Élan Béarnais Pau-Orthez
- 2023–2024: JDA Dijon
- 2024–2025: SIG Strasbourg

Career highlights
- All-French League Team (2023); 2× French Cup winner (2022, 2024); 2× French Cup Final MVP (2022, 2024); Zimbabwean League champion (2011)
- Stats at Basketball Reference

Vitalis Chikoko (born 11 February 1991) is a Zimbabwean professional basketball player who last played for SIG Strasbourg of the French LNB Pro A.

== Early life ==
Chikoko started playing basketball at age 12 in Harare.

== Professional career ==
Chikoko started his career in Zimbabwe with the Mbare Heat from Mbare suburb in his hometown Harare. He left in 2011 to play for ASC Göttingen in Germany, before transferring to Basketball Bundesliga club BG Göttingen later that year. After one year with Göttingen, Chikoko transferred to TBB Trier where he would stay for three seasons.

In 2015, Chikoko joined Pallacanestro Reggiana of the Italian Lega Basket Serie A (LBA).

In 2022, Chikoko helped Élan Béarnais win their fourth-ever French Cup by scoring 15 points and grabbing 8 rebounds in the final against SIG Strasbourg. After the game, he was named the French Cup Final MVP. Chikoko was the first African MVP in French basketball history. On 17 May 2023 he was named to the All-Pro A First Team of the 2022–23 season.

On 17 July 2023 he signed with JDA Dijon of the LNB Pro A. On 27 April 2024, Dijon won their third French Cup in history, and Chikoko was named the Final MVP. He became the only player to have won two French Cup Final MVP awards.

On June 21, 2024, he signed with SIG Strasbourg of the French LNB Pro A.

== International career ==
Chikoko has previously represented Zimbabwe on the international stage at both the junior and senior levels. He played for his country at the 2008 FIBA Africa Under-18 Championship and the FIBA AfroBasket 2011 qualifying rounds. On FIBA AfroBasket 2015 he averaged 13.4 points, 8.8 rebounds and 1.2 assists per game.

== Personal ==
Chikoko is married and has two children, Nashe-Vitalis and Anaya-Lucy.

He founded Basket Hounds, a basketball team in Harare, Zimbabwe, in 2022. The Hounds play in the national top-level BUZ National Championship.
