= Dinamo Sassari =

- Nickname: Banco (Bank); Biancoblu (White-Blues); Giganti (Giants)
- Leagues: Serie A2
- Founded: 23 April 1960; 66 years ago
- History: Dinamo Sassari (1960–present)
- Arena: Palasport Roberta Serradimigni
- Capacity: 5,000
- Location: Sassari, Italy
- Team colors: Blue and white
- Main sponsor: Banco di Sardegna
- President: Stefano Sardara
- Team manager: Federico Pasquini
- Head coach: Luca Vitali
- Team captain: Giacomo Devecchi
- Ownership: Polisportiva Dinamo s.r.l.
- Championships: 1 FIBA Europe Cup; 1 Serie A; 2 Italian Cup; 2 Italian SuperCup
- Retired numbers: 2 (12, 12)
- Website: dinamobasket.com
Serie A Home	Serie A Away	Champions League Home
Champions League Away	Supercup Home	Supercup Away

Dinamo Sassari, currently known as Dinamo Banco di Sardegna Sassari for sponsorship reasons, is an Italian professional basketball club based in Sassari, Sardinia. Founded in 1960, due to sponsorship deals, in the past has also been known as Banco Popolare Sassari (1989–90). Dinamo are the 2018–19 European Cup champions. The team currently plays in Serie A2 following its first relegation from the top Italian division Lega Basket Serie A (LBA) in the 2025–26 season, their first since 2010.

Dinamo Sassari is notable for being the club in Italian professional basketball to have made the impressive score of 158 points scored in a single game (with no overtimes), during the 1994–95 Serie A2 regular season, versus Pallacanestro Pavia (91); which is the highest score ever made by any club in Italy.

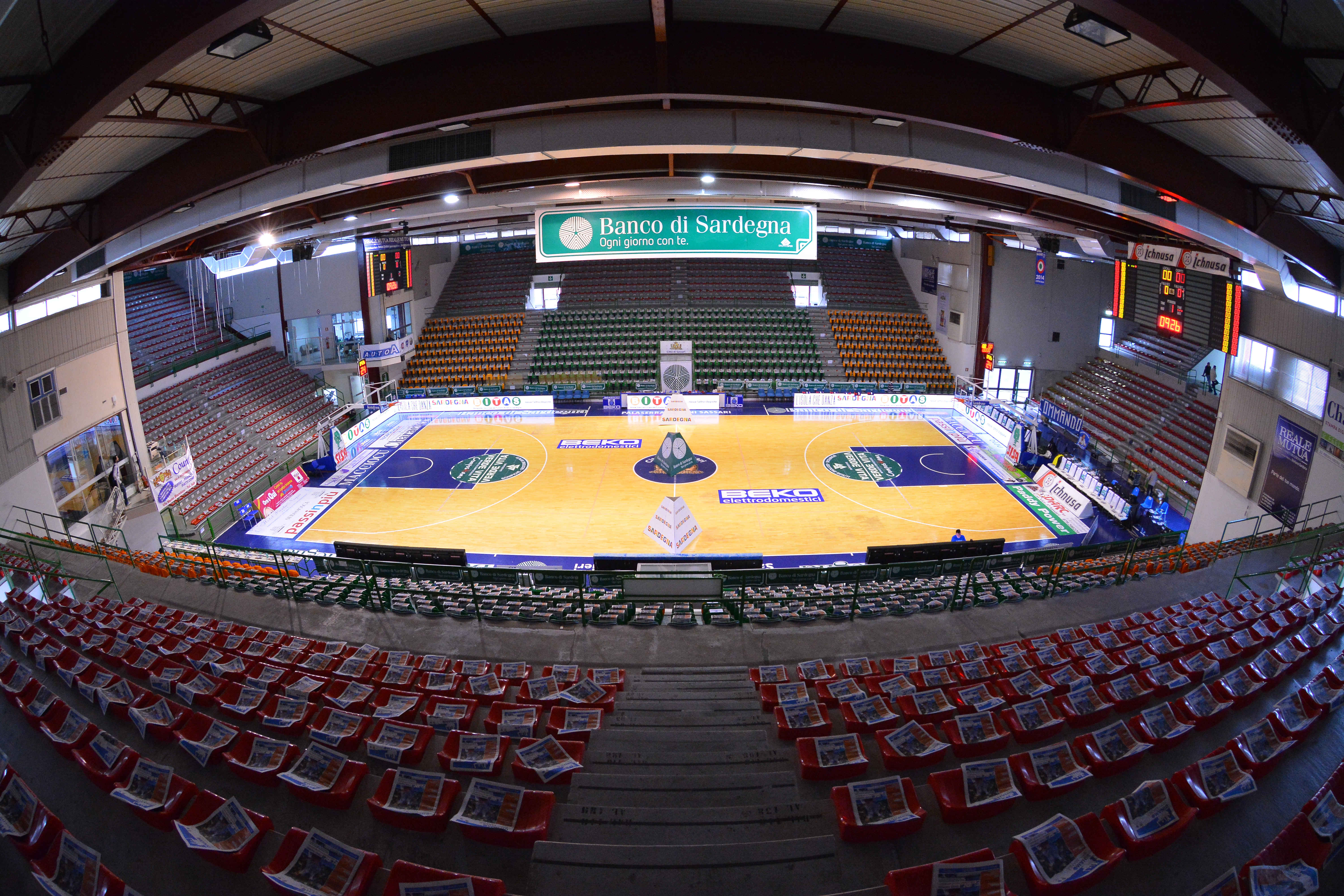
The Palasport Roberta Serradimigni, home arena of Dinamo.

== History ==
In 1994–95, the Dinamo team scored 158 points in a regular season game without overtimes against Pavia.

In 2010, Dinamo promoted to the Serie A, when it beat Prima Veroli in the Finals of the Playoffs.

In 2012, the club made its debut in Europe, when it played in the EuroCup regular season. The 2013–14 season was one of the most historic ever for the club. Banco di Sardegna Sassari won the Italian Cup, the team's first trophy. Dinamo's star player Travis Diener was named Italian Cup MVP. Later in the season Drake Diener – Travis' cousin – was named Italian League MVP. Dinamo also played in the EuroCup once again, and reached the eight-finals this time around.

Despite the third place and elimination in the Italian League semifinals in 2014, Dinamo was invited to play in the 2014–15 EuroLeague season. After Montepaschi Siena, runner-up in the Italian league, resigned the club received a B license.

In the 2014–15 season, Dinamo won its first Italian League championship. In Game 7 of the Italian League Finals, Sassari won 73–75, on the road against Reggio Emilia. Because of this, Dinamo returned to the EuroLeague in 2015. It was eliminated in the regular season and after transferring to the EuroCup it was eliminated in the round of 32.

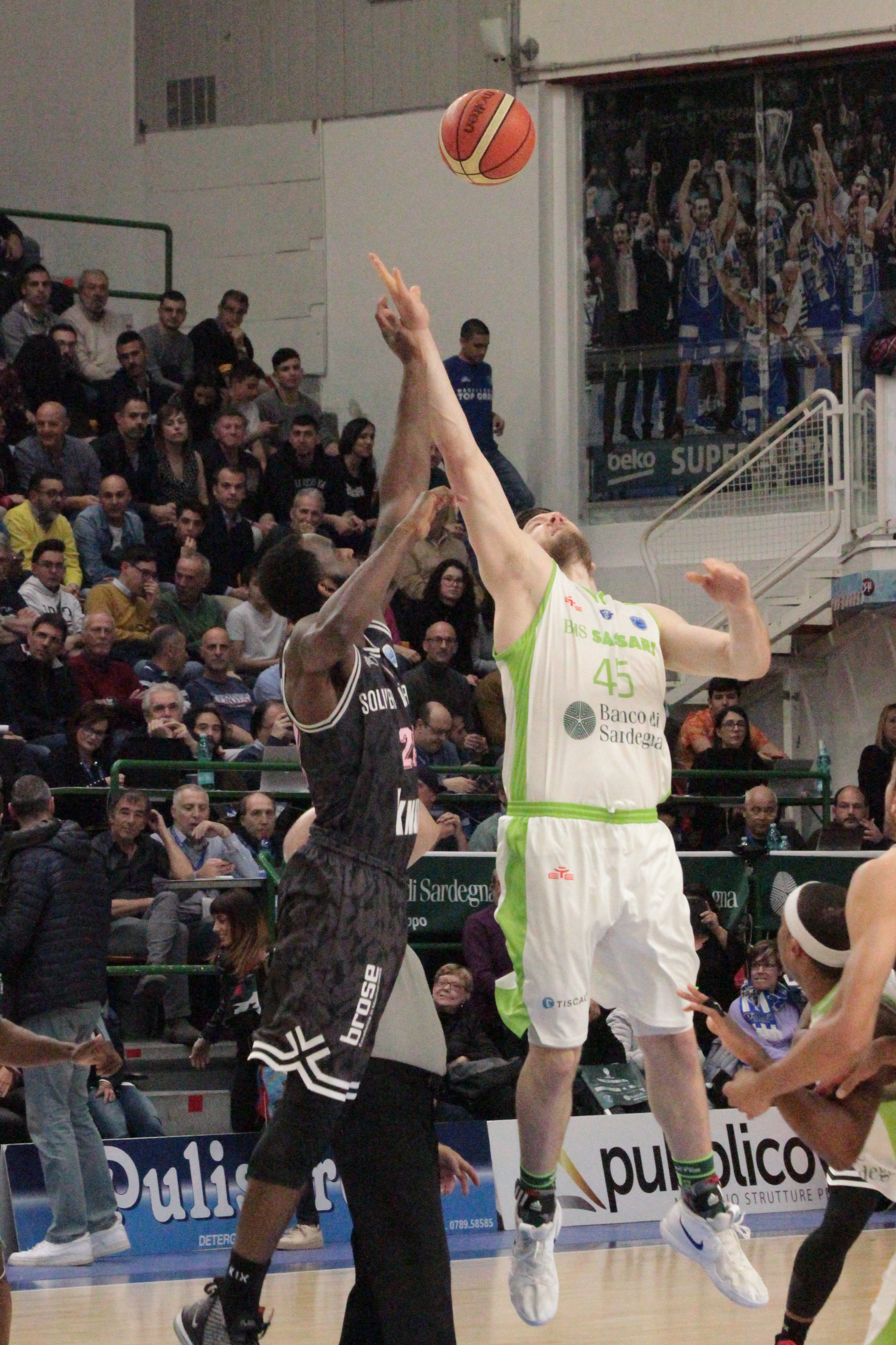
The tip off of the first leg of the 2019 FIBA Europe Cup Finals

In 2017, Dinamo reached the final of the Italian Cup, where it lost to Olimpia Milano. This season the club also made its debut in the Basketball Champions League and made the quarter-finals in its inaugural season. In the LBA, the team finished in the fifth place.

In the 2018–19 season, Dinamo played in the second qualifying round of FIBA Europe Cup. Here, it beat Benfica from Portugal to advance to the regular season. After advancing past the second round as well, Dinamo beat ZZ Leiden, Pınar Karşıyaka and Hapoel Holon. Thus, it qualified for the 2019 FIBA Europe Cup Finals where Dinamo faced German side s.Oliver Würzburg. On 1 May 2019, Sassari won the FIBA Europe Cup after defeating Würzburg in the second leg of the finals. It was the team's first European title.

In 2019 Sassari reached the LBA Finals for the second time in club history, four years since its championship. Dinamo was defeated by Umana Reyer Venezia in Game 7, losing the series 3–4.

== Honours ==
Total titles: 6

=== Domestic competitions ===
- Italian League

Winners (1): 2014–15
Runners-up (1): 2018–19

- Italian Cup

Winners (2): 2014, 2015
Runners-up (1): 2017

- Italian Supercup

Winners (2): 2014, 2019

=== European competitions ===
- FIBA Europe Cup

Winners (1): 2018–19

=== Other competitions ===
- Varallo Sesia, Italy Invitational Game

Winners (1): 2011

- Torneo Città di Cagliari

Runners-up (1): 2011

- Torneo Geovillage

Winners (2): 2014, 2015

- Nuoro, Italy Invitational Game

Winners (2): 2014, 2015
Runners-up (1): 2018

- Sassari, Italy Invitational Game

Winners (1): 2014

- Wroclaw, Poland Invitational Game

Runners-up (1): 2014

- Torneo de Città di Sassari

Runners-up (1): 2015

- Trofeo Meridiana

Winners (1): 2015

- Olbia, Italy Invitational Game

Winners (1): 2016

- Cagliari, Italy Invitational Game

Winners (1): 2018

- Saturnia, Italy Invitational Game

Winners (1): 2019

== Season by season ==
Season	Tier	League	Pos.	Italian Cup	European competitions	
2001–02	3	Serie B	2nd			
2002–03	3	Serie B	3rd			
2003–04	2	Legadue	10th			
2004–05	2	Legadue	13th			
2005–06	2	Legadue	11th			
2006–07	2	Legadue	13th			
2007–08	2	Legadue	6th			
2008–09	2	Legadue	3rd			
2009–10	2	Legadue	1st			
2010–11	1	Serie A	6th			
2011–12	1	Serie A	3rd	Quarterfinalist		
2012–13	1	Serie A	5th	Semifinalist	2 Eurocup	RS
2013–14	1	Serie A	3rd	Winner	2 Eurocup	EF
2014–15	1	Serie A	1st	Winner	1 Euroleague	RS
2014–15	1	Serie A	1st	Winner	2 Eurocup	R32
2015–16	1	Serie A	7th	Quarterfinalist	1 Euroleague	RS
2015–16	1	Serie A	7th	Quarterfinalist	2 Eurocup	R32
2016–17	1	LBA	5th	Runner-up	Champions League	QF
2017–18	1	LBA	10th		Champions League	RS
2017–18	1	LBA	10th		4 FIBA Europe Cup	R16
2018–19	1	LBA	2nd	Semifinalist	FIBA Europe Cup	C
2019–20	1	LBA	2nd	Quarterfinalist	Champions League	R16
2020–21	1	LBA	5th	Quarterfinalist	Champions League	R16
2021–22	1	LBA	4th	Quarterfinalist	Champions League	RS
2022–23	1	LBA	4th		Champions League	RS
2023–24	1	LBA	10th		Champions League	PI
2024–25	1	LBA	10th		Champions League	FQR
2024–25	1	LBA	10th		FIBA Europe Cup	2R

== Players ==
=== Retired numbers ===
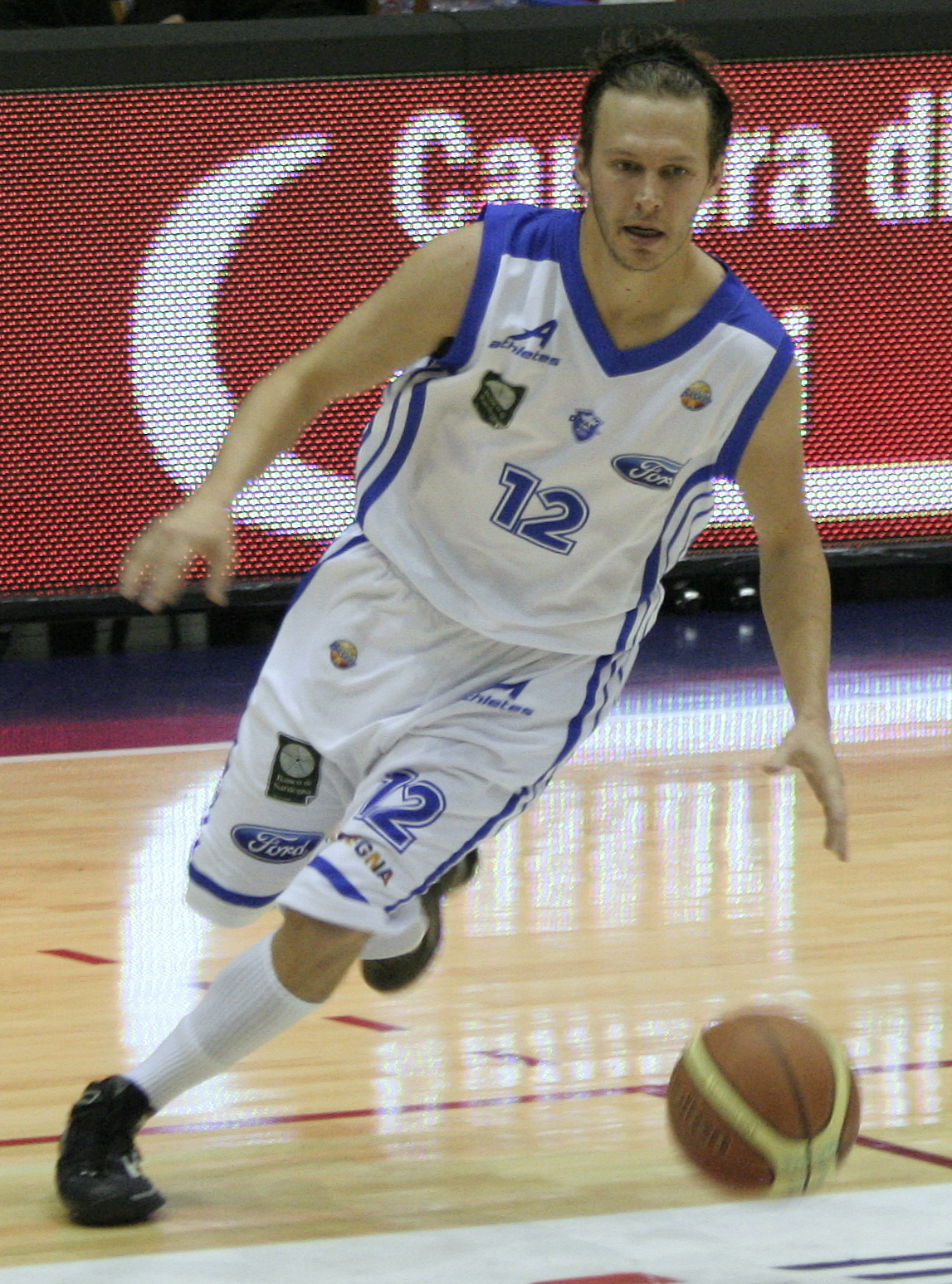
The American naturalized-Italian guard Travis Diener was the second player to have his number retired by Dinamo

Dinamo Sassari retired numbers
No	Nat.	Player	Position	Tenure
12	(Italy)	Emanuele Rotondo	G	1991–2007
12	(Italy)	Travis Diener	G	2010–2014

=== Current roster ===
Note: Flags indicate national team eligibility at FIBA-sanctioned events. Players may hold other non-FIBA nationalities not displayed.

Dinamo Sassari roster
Players
Coaches

Pos.	No.	Nat.	Name	Ht.	Wt.	Age
F	0	(United States)	Nze, Bryce	2.01 m (6 ft 7 in)	104 kg (229 lb)	28 – 2 March 1998
G	1	(Republic of Ireland)	Flood, Seán	1.85 m (6 ft 1 in)		30 – 10 September 1996
G	5	(Italy)	Grande, Alessandro	1.85 m (6 ft 1 in)	85 kg (187 lb)	31 – 8 November 1994
G	7	(Italy)	Longo, Stefano	1.93 m (6 ft 4 in)	83 kg (183 lb)	23 – 13 March 2003
G	11	(Italy)	Pisano, Riccardo	1.93 m (6 ft 4 in)	83 kg (183 lb)	21 – 11 April 2005
F/C	21	(Italy)	Nobili, Nicolò	2.08 m (6 ft 10 in)	100 kg (220 lb)	24 – 7 February 2002
PF	23	(Italy)	Brooks, Jeff	2.03 m (6 ft 8 in)	100 kg (220 lb)	37 – 12 June 1989
G	24	(Canada)	Kajami-Keane, Kaza	1.88 m (6 ft 2 in)	84 kg (185 lb)	32 – 27 January 1994
SG	25	(Estonia)	Riismaa, Joonas	1.99 m (6 ft 6 in)	90 kg (198 lb)	24 – 6 March 2002
PG	30	(Italy)	Monaldi, Diego	1.85 m (6 ft 1 in)	75 kg (165 lb)	33 – 3 April 1993
SG	31	(Italy)	Vitali, Michele	1.96 m (6 ft 5 in)	88 kg (194 lb)	34 – 31 October 1991
G/F	45	(Italy)	Aromando, Simone	2.01 m (6 ft 7 in)	100 kg (220 lb)	29 – 2 September 1997

Head coach

- (Italy) Luca Vitali

Assistant coach(es)

- (Italy) Massimiliano Oldoini
- (Italy) Antonio Carlini

Legend

- (C) Team captain
- Injured

- Roster
Updated: October 30, 2026

=== Depth chart ===
Pos.	Starting 5	Bench 1	Bench 2	Bench 3
C	Nicholas McGlynn	Nicolò Nobili	Fadilou Seck	Michele Cipriano
PF	Jeff Brooks	Andrea Mezzanotte	Luca Vincini
SF	Marco Ceron	Simone Aromando	Bryce Nze
SG	Michele Vitali	Joonas Riismaa	Riccardo Pisano	Francesco Brunu
PG	Kaza Kajami-Keane	Diego Monaldi	Alessandro Grande	Enrico Casu

== Women's team ==
Dinamo Sassari women's team debuted in the Serie A1 in 2020.

=== Women's roster ===
Note: Flags indicate national team eligibility at FIBA-sanctioned events. Players may hold other non-FIBA nationalities not displayed.

Dinamo Sassari (Women) roster
Players
Coaches

Pos.	No.	Nat.	Name	Ht.	Age
G	2	(United States)	Gonzales, Shaylee	1.78 m (5 ft 10 in)	26 – 2 May 2000
F	4	(Croatia)	Begic, Ana-Marija	1.90 m (6 ft 3 in)	32 – 17 January 1994
PG	5	(Italy)	Carangelo, Debora	1.63 m (5 ft 4 in)	34 – 2 October 1992
SG	8	(Italy)	Toffolo, Sara	1.84 m (6 ft 0 in)	26 – 25 September 2000
G	9	(Italy)	Natali, Julia	1.76 m (5 ft 9 in)	24 – 21 June 2002
G/F	11	(Italy)	Pastrello, Silvia	1.79 m (5 ft 10 in)	25 – 24 February 2001
SG	12	(United States)	Taylor, Sparkle	1.78 m (5 ft 10 in)	31 – 28 July 1995
C	15	(Spain)	Diallo, Umo	1.93 m (6 ft 4 in)	28 – 12 January 1998
PG	24	(Italy)	Grattini, Chiara	1.72 m (5 ft 8 in)	25 – 16 April 2001
PG	27	(Italy)	Spiga, Giulietta	1.78 m (5 ft 10 in)	20 – 6 October 2006

Head coach

- (Italy) Antonello Restivo

Assistant coach(es)

- (Italy) Mario Alberto Conte

Legend

- (C) Team captain
- Injured

- Roster
Updated: 10 November 2024

== See also ==
- S.E.F. Torres 1903
- Torres Calcio Femminile
- U.S.D. Latte Dolce
