= 2018 LBA Finals =

2018 LBA finals
| Team | Coach | Wins |
|---|---|---|
| EA7 Emporio Armani Milano | Simone Pianigiani | 4 |
| Dolomiti Energia Trento | Maurizio Buscaglia | 2 |
- Dates: June 5–11, 2015
- MVP: (United States) Andrew Goudelock

The 2018 LBA Finals was the championship series of the 2017–18 regular season, of the Lega Basket Serie A (LBA), known for sponsorship reasons as the Serie A PosteMobile, the highest professional basketball league in Italy, and the conclusion of the season's playoffs. The second placed EA7 Emporio Armani Milano possessing home advantage (with the first two, the fifth and the seventh games at the Mediolanum Forum) and the 5th placed Dolomiti Energia Trento contested for the title in a best-of-7 showdown, from June 5 to June 15, 2018. These were the second Finals for Trento and the 18th for Milano.

EA7 Emporio Armani Milano won their 28th title by beating Dolomiti Energia Trento in game 6 of the finals.

Andrew Goudelock of the EA7 Emporio Armani Milano was named MVP in the league's Finals series of the playoffs.

== Road to the finals ==
| EA7 Emporio Armani Milano | | Dolomiti Energia Trento |
|---|---|---|
| Pos / Team / Pld / W / L / PF / PA / PD; 1 / Umana Reyer Venezia / 30 / 23 / 7 / 2481 / 2364 / +117; 2 / EA7 Emporio Armani Milano / 30 / 22 / 8 / 2463 / 2244 / +219; 3 / Germani Basket Brescia / 30 / 20 / 10 / 2397 / 2282 / +115; 4 / Sidigas Avellino / 30 / 20 / 10 / 2492 / 2313 / +179; 5 / Dolomiti Energia Trento / 30 / 18 / 12 / 2423 / 2304 / +119; 6 / Openjobmetis Varese / 30 / 16 / 14 / 2355 / 2271 / +84; 7 / Red October Cantù / 30 / 16 / 14 / 2619 / 2614 / +5; 8 / Vanoli Cremona / 30 / 15 / 15 / 2554 / 2495 / +59; 9 / Segafredo Virtus Bologna / 30 / 15 / 15 / 2353 / 2292 / +61; 10 / Banco di Sardegna Sassari / 30 / 15 / 15 / 2586 / 2488 / +98; 11 / Fiat Torino / 30 / 13 / 17 / 2432 / 2494 / −62; 12 / Grissin Bon Reggio Emilia / 30 / 13 / 17 / 2322 / 2362 / −40; 13 / The Flexx Pistoia / 29 / 9 / 20 / 2267 / 2449 / −182; 14 / New Basket Brindisi / 29 / 9 / 20 / 2232 / 2363 / −131; 15 / VL Pesaro / 29 / 8 / 21 / 2310 / 2547 / −237; 16 / Betaland Capo d'Orlando / 29 / 7 / 22 / 2153 / 2544 / −391; Source: LBA 2nd best league record | Regular season | Pos / Team / Pld / W / L / PF / PA / PD; 1 / Umana Reyer Venezia / 30 / 23 / 7 / 2481 / 2364 / +117; 2 / EA7 Emporio Armani Milano / 30 / 22 / 8 / 2463 / 2244 / +219; 3 / Germani Basket Brescia / 30 / 20 / 10 / 2397 / 2282 / +115; 4 / Sidigas Avellino / 30 / 20 / 10 / 2492 / 2313 / +179; 5 / Dolomiti Energia Trento / 30 / 18 / 12 / 2423 / 2304 / +119; 6 / Openjobmetis Varese / 30 / 16 / 14 / 2355 / 2271 / +84; 7 / Red October Cantù / 30 / 16 / 14 / 2619 / 2614 / +5; 8 / Vanoli Cremona / 30 / 15 / 15 / 2554 / 2495 / +59; 9 / Segafredo Virtus Bologna / 30 / 15 / 15 / 2353 / 2292 / +61; 10 / Banco di Sardegna Sassari / 30 / 15 / 15 / 2586 / 2488 / +98; 11 / Fiat Torino / 30 / 13 / 17 / 2432 / 2494 / −62; 12 / Grissin Bon Reggio Emilia / 30 / 13 / 17 / 2322 / 2362 / −40; 13 / The Flexx Pistoia / 29 / 9 / 20 / 2267 / 2449 / −182; 14 / New Basket Brindisi / 29 / 9 / 20 / 2232 / 2363 / −131; 15 / VL Pesaro / 29 / 8 / 21 / 2310 / 2547 / −237; 16 / Betaland Capo d'Orlando / 29 / 7 / 22 / 2153 / 2544 / −391; Source: LBA 5th best league record |
| Defeated the 7th seeded Red October Cantù, 3-0 | Quarterfinals | Defeated the 4th seeded Sidigas Avellino, 3-1 |
| Defeated the 3rd seeded Germani Basket Brescia, 3-1 | Semifinals | Defeated the 1st seeded Umana Reyer Venezia, 3-1 |

=== Italian Basketball Supercup ===
| 23 September 2017 | EA7 Emporio Armani Milano | 74–65 | Dolomiti Energia Trento | Forlì |
| 17:30 (CEST) | Scoring by quarter: 20–13, 19–14, 20–14, 15–21 |
| Eurosport | Pts: Goudelock 24; Rebs: Gudaitis 10; Asts: Theodore 6 PIR: Goudelock 20 | Boxscore | Pts: Behanan 13; Rebs: Sutton 7 Asts: Forray 5 PIR: Behanan 19 | Arena: Unieuro Arena; Referees: Carmelo Paternicò, Beniamino Manuel Attard, Denny Borgioni |

=== Regular season series ===
| 11 November 2017 | Dolomiti Energia Trento | 55–74 | EA7 Emporio Armani Milano | Trento |
| 20:45 (CEST) | Scoring by quarter: 24–21, 10–15, 10–20, 11–18 |
| Eurosport | Pts: Behanan 17; Rebs: Behanan 7 Asts: Sutton 3 PIR: Forray 14 | Boxscore | Pts: Theodore 18; Rebs: Cusin 7 Asts: Goudelock 2 PIR: Cusin 13 | Arena: PalaTrento; Referees: Roberto Begnis, Luca Weidmann, Christian Borgo |

| 17 March 2018 | EA7 Emporio Armani Milano | 88–80 | Dolomiti Energia Trento | Assago |
| 18:00 (CEST) | Scoring by quarter: 18–20, 20–16, 23–25, 27–19 |
| Eurosport | Pts: Micov 28; Rebs: Gudaitis 8 Asts: Cinciarini 5 PIR: Micov 30 | Boxscore | Pts: Flaccadori 16; Rebs: Shields 10; Asts: Shields 7 PIR: Gomes 16 | Arena: Mediolanum Forum; Referees: Roberto Begnis, Alessandro Martolini, Andrea Bongiorni |

== Series ==
=== Game 1 ===
| 5 June 2018 | EA7 Emporio Armani Milano | 98–85 (Series: 1–0) | Dolomiti Energia Trento | Assago |
| 20:45 (CEST) | Scoring by quarter: 15–12, 32–22, 23–18, 28–33 |
| Eurosport; Rai Sport | Pts: Goudelock 26; Rebs: Tarczewski 9 Asts: Micov, Cinciarini 5 PIR: Tarczewski 27 | Boxscore | Pts: Shields 31; Rebs: Sutton 7 Asts: Shields 5 PIR: Shields 31 | Arena: Mediolanum Forum; Referees: Enrico Sabetta, Saverio Lanzarini, Emanuele Aronne |

| Starters: | | | Pts | Reb | Ast |
|---|---|---|---|---|---|
| PG | 20 | (Italy) Andrea Cinciarini | 6 | 4 | 5 |
| SF | 19 | (Lithuania) Mindaugas Kuzminskas | 5 | 2 | 2 |
| SF | 5 | (Serbia) Vladimir Micov | 16 | 3 | 5 |
| SG | 0 | (United States) Andrew Goudelock | 26 | 1 | 2 |
| C | 15 | (United States) Kaleb Tarczewski | 14 | 9 | 1 |
| Reserves: | | | | | |
| SG | 6 | (Italy) Simone Vecerina | DNP | | |
| PF | 7 | (Italy) Davide Pascolo | 2 | 0 | 0 |
| C | 22 | (Italy) Marco Cusin | DNP | | |
| SF | 23 | (Italy) Awudu Abass | DNP | | |
| SG | 45 | (Latvia) Dairis Bertāns | 9 | 1 | 0 |
| PG | 55 | (United States) Curtis Jerrells | 10 | 1 | 3 |
| C | 77 | (Lithuania) Artūras Gudaitis | 10 | 6 | 1 |
Head coach:
(Italy) Simone Pianigiani

| EA7 Emporio Armani Milano | Dolomiti Energia Trento |

| Starters: | | | Pts | Reb | Ast |
|---|---|---|---|---|---|
| PG | 10 | (Italy) Andrés Pablo Forray | 11 | 1 | 3 |
| PF | 2 | (United States) Dominique Sutton | 8 | 7 | 2 |
| SF | 4 | (Latvia) Ojārs Siliņš | 0 | 0 | 0 |
| SG | 31 | (Denmark) Shavon Shields | 31 | 3 | 5 |
| C | 22 | (United States) Dustin Hogue | 8 | 3 | 2 |
| Reserves: | | | | | |
| SG | 5 | (Netherlands) Yannick Franke | 11 | 1 | 3 |
| G | 11 | (Italy) Luca Conti | DNP | | |
| SG | 12 | (Italy) Diego Flaccadori | DNP | | |
| PG | 13 | (Mexico) Jorge Gutiérrez | 6 | 4 | 1 |
| SF | 14 | (North Macedonia) Mark Czumbel | DNP | | |
| F | 15 | (Portugal) João Gomes | 10 | 5 | 0 |
| C | 25 | (Italy) Luca Lechthaler | 0 | 2 | 1 |
Head coach:
(Italy) Maurizio Buscaglia

=== Game 2 ===
| 7 June 2018 | EA7 Emporio Armani Milano | 90–80 (Series: 2–0) | Dolomiti Energia Trento | Assago |
| 20:45 (CEST) | Scoring by quarter: 27–29, 30–18, 14–14, 19–19 |
| Eurosport; Rai Sport | Pts: Jerrells 27; Rebs: Gudaitis 9 Asts: Micov 3 PIR: Jerrells 24 | Boxscore | Pts: Gomes 18; Rebs: Sutton 6 Asts: Shields 5 PIR: Gomes 21 | Arena: Mediolanum Forum; Referees: Roberto Begnis, Tolga Sahin, Gianluca Sardella |

| Starters: | | | Pts | Reb | Ast |
|---|---|---|---|---|---|
| PG | 20 | (Italy) Andrea Cinciarini | 2 | 1 | 2 |
| SF | 19 | (Lithuania) Mindaugas Kuzminskas | 4 | 3 | 1 |
| SF | 5 | (Serbia) Vladimir Micov | 11 | 4 | 3 |
| SG | 0 | (United States) Andrew Goudelock | 25 | 3 | 1 |
| C | 15 | (United States) Kaleb Tarczewski | 4 | 6 | 1 |
| Reserves: | | | | | |
| SG | 6 | (Italy) Simone Vecerina | DNP | | |
| PF | 7 | (Italy) Davide Pascolo | 0 | 1 | 0 |
| C | 22 | (Italy) Marco Cusin | DNP | | |
| SF | 23 | (Italy) Awudu Abass | DNP | | |
| SG | 45 | (Latvia) Dairis Bertāns | 6 | 1 | 1 |
| PG | 55 | (United States) Curtis Jerrells | 27 | 2 | 1 |
| C | 77 | (Lithuania) Artūras Gudaitis | 11 | 9 | 0 |
Head coach:
(Italy) Simone Pianigiani

| EA7 Emporio Armani Milano | Dolomiti Energia Trento |

| Starters: | | | Pts | Reb | Ast |
|---|---|---|---|---|---|
| PG | 10 | (Italy) Andrés Pablo Forray | 9 | 1 | 3 |
| PF | 2 | (United States) Dominique Sutton | 8 | 6 | 1 |
| SF | 4 | (Latvia) Ojārs Siliņš | 15 | 0 | 0 |
| SG | 31 | (Denmark) Shavon Shields | 17 | 2 | 5 |
| C | 22 | (United States) Dustin Hogue | 3 | 5 | 1 |
| Reserves: | | | | | |
| SG | 5 | (Netherlands) Yannick Franke | 3 | 2 | 0 |
| G | 11 | (Italy) Luca Conti | DNP | | |
| SG | 12 | (Italy) Diego Flaccadori | DNP | | |
| PG | 13 | (Mexico) Jorge Gutiérrez | 7 | 4 | 4 |
| SF | 14 | (North Macedonia) Mark Czumbel | DNP | | |
| F | 15 | (Portugal) João Gomes | 18 | 5 | 1 |
| C | 25 | (Italy) Luca Lechthaler | DNP | | |
Head coach:
(Italy) Maurizio Buscaglia

=== Game 3 ===
| 9 June 2018 | Dolomiti Energia Trento | 72–65 (Series: 1–2) | EA7 Emporio Armani Milano | Trento |
| 20:45 (CEST) | Scoring by quarter: 17–17, 18–14, 23–17, 14–17 |
| Eurosport; Rai Sport | Pts: Sutton 19; Rebs: three players 10; Asts: Shields 6 PIR: Hogue 25 | Boxscore | Pts: Jerrells, Bertāns 13; Rebs: Micov 9 Asts: Cinciarini 5 PIR: Gudaitis 11 | Arena: PalaTrento; Referees: Carmelo Paternico', Manuel Mazzoni, Michele Rossi |

| Starters: | | | Pts | Reb | Ast |
|---|---|---|---|---|---|
| PG | 10 | (Italy) Andrés Pablo Forray | 4 | 10 | 0 |
| PF | 2 | (United States) Dominique Sutton | 19 | 10 | 2 |
| SF | 4 | (Latvia) Ojārs Siliņš | 8 | 1 | 0 |
| SG | 31 | (Denmark) Shavon Shields | 6 | 2 | 6 |
| C | 22 | (United States) Dustin Hogue | 18 | 10 | 0 |
| Reserves: | | | | | |
| SG | 5 | (Netherlands) Yannick Franke | 0 | 0 | 0 |
| G | 11 | (Italy) Luca Conti | DNP | | |
| SG | 12 | (Italy) Diego Flaccadori | DNP | | |
| PG | 13 | (Mexico) Jorge Gutiérrez | 4 | 1 | 4 |
| SF | 14 | (North Macedonia) Mark Czumbel | DNP | | |
| F | 15 | (Portugal) João Gomes | 13 | 5 | 1 |
| C | 25 | (Italy) Luca Lechthaler | DNP | | |
Head coach:
(Italy) Maurizio Buscaglia

| Dolomiti Energia Trento | EA7 Emporio Armani Milano |

| Starters: | | | Pts | Reb | Ast |
|---|---|---|---|---|---|
| PG | 20 | (Italy) Andrea Cinciarini | 3 | 3 | 5 |
| SF | 19 | (Lithuania) Mindaugas Kuzminskas | 7 | 3 | 1 |
| SF | 5 | (Serbia) Vladimir Micov | 6 | 9 | 3 |
| SG | 0 | (United States) Andrew Goudelock | 8 | 2 | 0 |
| C | 15 | (United States) Kaleb Tarczewski | 6 | 3 | 0 |
| Reserves: | | | | | |
| SG | 6 | (Italy) Giordano Bortolani | DNP | | |
| PF | 7 | (Italy) Davide Pascolo | 2 | 1 | 0 |
| C | 22 | (Italy) Marco Cusin | DNP | | |
| SF | 23 | (Italy) Awudu Abass | 0 | 0 | 0 |
| SG | 45 | (Latvia) Dairis Bertāns | 13 | 0 | 0 |
| PG | 55 | (United States) Curtis Jerrells | 13 | 2 | 3 |
| C | 77 | (Lithuania) Artūras Gudaitis | 7 | 6 | 0 |
Head coach:
(Italy) Simone Pianigiani

=== Game 4 ===
| 11 June 2018 | Dolomiti Energia Trento | 77–74 (Series: 2–2) | EA7 Emporio Armani Milano | Trento |
| 20:45 (CEST) | Scoring by quarter: 11–13, 18–21, 23–21, 25–19 |
| Eurosport; Rai Sport | Pts: Shields 31; Rebs: Shields 8 Asts: Forray 5 PIR: Shields 39 | Boxscore | Pts: Goudelock 14; Rebs: Gudaitis 6 Asts: Micov 4 PIR: Micov 15 | Arena: PalaTrento; Referees: Dino Seghetti, Carmelo Lo Guzzo, Alessandro Martolini |

| Starters: | | | Pts | Reb | Ast |
|---|---|---|---|---|---|
| PG | 10 | (Italy) Andrés Pablo Forray | 3 | 5 | 5 |
| PF | 2 | (United States) Dominique Sutton | 13 | 2 | 1 |
| SF | 4 | (Latvia) Ojārs Siliņš | 9 | 0 | 0 |
| SG | 31 | (Denmark) Shavon Shields | 31 | 8 | 3 |
| C | 22 | (United States) Dustin Hogue | 14 | 7 | 0 |
| Reserves: | | | | | |
| SG | 5 | (Netherlands) Yannick Franke | 0 | 0 | 0 |
| G | 11 | (Italy) Luca Conti | DNP | | |
| SG | 12 | (Italy) Diego Flaccadori | DNP | | |
| PG | 13 | (Mexico) Jorge Gutiérrez | 2 | 5 | 3 |
| SF | 14 | (North Macedonia) Mark Czumbel | DNP | | |
| F | 15 | (Portugal) João Gomes | 3 | 4 | 1 |
| C | 25 | (Italy) Luca Lechthaler | 2 | 1 | 0 |
Head coach:
(Italy) Maurizio Buscaglia

| Dolomiti Energia Trento | EA7 Emporio Armani Milano |

| Starters: | | | Pts | Reb | Ast |
|---|---|---|---|---|---|
| PG | 20 | (Italy) Andrea Cinciarini | 9 | 2 | 1 |
| SF | 19 | (Lithuania) Mindaugas Kuzminskas | 4 | 3 | 2 |
| SF | 5 | (Serbia) Vladimir Micov | 14 | 4 | 4 |
| SG | 0 | (United States) Andrew Goudelock | 14 | 1 | 0 |
| C | 15 | (United States) Kaleb Tarczewski | 8 | 3 | 0 |
| Reserves: | | | | | |
| SG | 6 | (Italy) Simone Vecerina | DNP | | |
| PF | 7 | (Italy) Davide Pascolo | DNP | | |
| C | 22 | (Italy) Marco Cusin | 2 | 3 | 0 |
| SF | 23 | (Italy) Awudu Abass | 0 | 4 | 0 |
| SG | 45 | (Latvia) Dairis Bertāns | 8 | 3 | 0 |
| PG | 55 | (United States) Curtis Jerrells | 10 | 0 | 1 |
| C | 77 | (Lithuania) Artūras Gudaitis | 6 | 6 | 0 |
Head coach:
(Italy) Simone Pianigiani

=== Game 5 ===
| 13 June 2018 | EA7 Emporio Armani Milano | 91–90 (Series: 3–2) | Dolomiti Energia Trento | Assago |
| 20:45 (CEST) | Scoring by quarter: 31–22, 17–28, 23–16, 20–24 |
| Eurosport; Rai Sport | Pts: Gudaitis, Kuzminskas 19; Rebs: Gudaitis, Tarczewski 6 Asts: Micov 7 PIR: Gudaitis 28 | Boxscore | Pts: Shields 27; Rebs: Hogue 9 Asts: three players 4 PIR: Hogue, Shields 23 | Arena: Mediolanum Forum; Referees: Saverio Lanzarini, Manuel Mazzoni, Mark Bartoli |

| Starters: | | | Pts | Reb | Ast |
|---|---|---|---|---|---|
| PG | 20 | (Italy) Andrea Cinciarini | 15 | 3 | 4 |
| SF | 19 | (Lithuania) Mindaugas Kuzminskas | 19 | 2 | 1 |
| SF | 5 | (Serbia) Vladimir Micov | 4 | 2 | 7 |
| SG | 0 | (United States) Andrew Goudelock | 16 | 4 | 0 |
| C | 15 | (United States) Kaleb Tarczewski | 2 | 6 | 0 |
| Reserves: | | | | | |
| SG | 6 | (Italy) Simone Vecerina | DNP | | |
| PF | 7 | (Italy) Davide Pascolo | 0 | 0 | 1 |
| C | 22 | (Italy) Marco Cusin | DNP | | |
| SF | 23 | (Italy) Awudu Abass | 0 | 0 | 0 |
| SG | 45 | (Latvia) Dairis Bertāns | 8 | 1 | 0 |
| PG | 55 | (United States) Curtis Jerrells | 8 | 4 | 3 |
| C | 77 | (Lithuania) Artūras Gudaitis | 19 | 6 | 2 |
Head coach:
(Italy) Simone Pianigiani

| EA7 Emporio Armani Milano | Dolomiti Energia Trento |

| Starters: | | | Pts | Reb | Ast |
|---|---|---|---|---|---|
| PG | 10 | (Italy) Andrés Pablo Forray | 4 | 2 | 4 |
| PF | 2 | (United States) Dominique Sutton | 15 | 5 | 4 |
| SF | 4 | (Latvia) Ojārs Siliņš | 6 | 2 | 1 |
| SG | 31 | (Denmark) Shavon Shields | 27 | 1 | 2 |
| C | 22 | (United States) Dustin Hogue | 14 | 9 | 1 |
| Reserves: | | | | | |
| SG | 5 | (Netherlands) Yannick Franke | 3 | 1 | 1 |
| G | 11 | (Italy) Luca Conti | DNP | | |
| SG | 12 | (Italy) Diego Flaccadori | DNP | | |
| PG | 13 | (Mexico) Jorge Gutiérrez | 9 | 3 | 4 |
| SF | 14 | (North Macedonia) Mark Czumbel | DNP | | |
| F | 15 | (Portugal) João Gomes | 12 | 2 | 1 |
| C | 25 | (Italy) Luca Lechthaler | 0 | 1 | 0 |
Head coach:
(Italy) Maurizio Buscaglia

=== Game 6 ===
EA7 Emporio Armani Milano returned to the Italian throne on Friday night. In Game 6 of the Italian League playoff finals, Milan dominated to defeated Dolomiti Energia Trento 71-96 to claim the series 4-2 and become the Italian champion for the 28th time in club history. This is also third league title in the last five years for Milan which took control of this game from the start. Vladimir Micov and Mindaugas Kuzminskas hit triple and Artūras Gudaitis had a pair of dunks in a 1-10 first-quarter run that helped Milan to a 20-25 lead after 10 minutes, before a pair of triples from Dairis Bertāns, one from Andrew Goudelock, and baskets from Gudaitis and Curtis Jerrells opened 23-42 margin early in the second quarter. The visitors went into halftime with a 15-point lead, and never relinquished it. Trento got within 50-57 midway through the third, but Milan entered the final period with a 56-66 lead, before Goudelock, Bertāns and Kuzminskas each hit once from downtown in the first 2 minutes of the fourth, restoring a 15-point lead and Milan cruised the rest of the way. Milan had a balanced attack with six scorers in double figures. Goudelock finished with 21 points, Kuzminskas and Bertāns netted 15 apiece, and Gudaitis collected 14 points and 9 rebounds. Dominique Sutton scored 15 for Trento, and Shavon Shields and Toto Forray each scored 14 in the losing effort.

| 15 June 2018 | Dolomiti Energia Trento | 71–96 (Series: 2–4) | EA7 Emporio Armani Milano | Trento |
| 20:45 (CEST) | Scoring by quarter: 20–25, 13–23, 23–18, 15–30 |
| Eurosport; Rai Sport | Pts: Sutton 15; Rebs: Gomes, Hogue 7 Asts: Sutton, Forray 2 PIR: Forray 19 | Boxscore | Pts: Goudelock 21; Rebs: Gudaitis 9 Asts: Jerrells 6 PIR: Goudelock 24 | Arena: PalaTrento; Referees: Carmelo Paternoco', Roberto Begnis, Lorenzo Baldini |

| Starters: | | | Pts | Reb | Ast |
|---|---|---|---|---|---|
| PG | 10 | (Italy) Andrés Pablo Forray | 14 | 6 | 2 |
| PF | 2 | (United States) Dominique Sutton | 15 | 5 | 2 |
| SF | 4 | (Latvia) Ojārs Siliņš | 2 | 1 | 0 |
| SG | 31 | (Denmark) Shavon Shields | 14 | 3 | 0 |
| C | 22 | (United States) Dustin Hogue | 9 | 7 | 0 |
| Reserves: | | | | | |
| SG | 5 | (Netherlands) Yannick Franke | 2 | 0 | 0 |
| G | 11 | (Italy) Mattia Musumeci | DNP | | |
| SG | 12 | (Italy) Diego Flaccadori | DNP | | |
| PG | 13 | (Mexico) Jorge Gutiérrez | 8 | 1 | 1 |
| SF | 14 | (Italy) Isacco Lovisotto | DNP | | |
| F | 15 | (Portugal) João Gomes | 7 | 7 | 1 |
| C | 25 | (Italy) Luca Lechthaler | 0 | 0 | 0 |
Head coach:
(Italy) Maurizio Buscaglia

| Dolomiti Energia Trento | EA7 Emporio Armani Milano |

Serie A Finals MVP
(United States) Andrew Goudelock
Game rules
Game played under FIBA rules.

2017–18 LBA Winners

EA7 Emporio Armani Milano
28th title

| Starters: | | | Pts | Reb | Ast |
|---|---|---|---|---|---|
| PG | 20 | (Italy) Andrea Cinciarini | 2 | 0 | 1 |
| SF | 19 | (Lithuania) Mindaugas Kuzminskas | 15 | 5 | 1 |
| SF | 5 | (Serbia) Vladimir Micov | 10 | 3 | 0 |
| SG | 0 | (United States) Andrew Goudelock | 21 | 3 | 4 |
| C | 15 | (United States) Kaleb Tarczewski | 6 | 3 | 0 |
| Reserves: | | | | | |
| SG | 6 | (Italy) Simone Vecerina | DNP | | |
| PF | 7 | (Italy) Davide Pascolo | DNP | | |
| C | 22 | (Italy) Marco Cusin | 1 | 2 | 0 |
| SF | 23 | (Italy) Awudu Abass | 0 | 0 | 0 |
| SG | 45 | (Latvia) Dairis Bertāns | 15 | 1 | 1 |
| PG | 55 | (United States) Curtis Jerrells | 12 | 4 | 6 |
| C | 77 | (Lithuania) Artūras Gudaitis | 14 | 9 | 0 |
Head coach:
(Italy) Simone Pianigiani

== Rosters ==
=== EA7 Emporio Armani Milano ===
Olimpia Milano roster
Players
Coaches

| Pos. | No. | Nat. | Name | Ht. | Wt. | Age |
|---|---|---|---|---|---|---|
| SG | 0 | (United States) | Goudelock, Andrew | 1.91 m (6 ft 3 in) | 91 kg (201 lb) | 36 – 7 December 1988 |
| SF | 5 | (Serbia) | Micov, Vladimir | 2.01 m (6 ft 7 in) | 101 kg (223 lb) | 39 – 16 April 1985 |
| PG | 9 | (Lithuania) | Kalnietis, Mantas | 1.95 m (6 ft 5 in) | 93 kg (205 lb) | 38 – 6 September 1986 |
| PF | 14 | (Italy) | Pascolo, Davide | 2.03 m (6 ft 8 in) | 91 kg (201 lb) | 34 – 14 December 1990 |
| C | 15 | (United States) | Tarczewski, Kaleb | 2.13 m (7 ft 0 in) | 111 kg (245 lb) | 32 – 26 February 1993 |
| SF | 19 | (Lithuania) | Kuzminskas, Mindaugas | 2.06 m (6 ft 9 in) | 98 kg (216 lb) | 35 – 19 October 1989 |
| PG | 20 | (Italy) | Cinciarini, Andrea (C) | 1.93 m (6 ft 4 in) | 84 kg (185 lb) | 38 – 21 June 1986 |
| C | 22 | (Italy) | Cusin, Marco | 2.11 m (6 ft 11 in) | 107 kg (236 lb) | 40 – 28 February 1985 |
| SF | 23 | (Italy) | Abass, Awudu | 2.00 m (6 ft 7 in) | 100 kg (220 lb) | 32 – 27 January 1993 |
| PF | 24 | (France) | M'Baye, Amath | 2.06 m (6 ft 9 in) | 102 kg (225 lb) | 35 – 14 December 1989 |
| PG | 25 | (North Macedonia) | Theodore, Jordan | 1.83 m (6 ft 0 in) | 79 kg (174 lb) | 35 – 11 December 1989 |
| SG | 45 | (Latvia) | Bertāns, Dairis | 1.93 m (6 ft 4 in) | 91 kg (201 lb) | 35 – 9 September 1989 |
| PG | 55 | (United States) | Jerrells, Curtis | 1.85 m (6 ft 1 in) | 88 kg (194 lb) | 38 – 5 February 1987 |
| C | 77 | (Lithuania) | Gudaitis, Artūras | 2.08 m (6 ft 10 in) | 115 kg (254 lb) | 31 – 19 June 1993 |

Head coach

- (Italy) Simone Pianigiani

Assistant coach(es)

- (Italy) Mario Fioretti
- (Italy) Massimo Cancellieri
- (Italy) Marco Esposito
- (Italy) Stefano Bizzozero

Athletic trainer(s)

- (Italy) Giustino Danesi

Physiotherapist(s)

- (Italy) Claudio Lomma
- (Italy) Alessandro Colombo

Team manager

- (Italy) Alberto Rossini

Legend

- (C) Team captain
- Injured

- Roster
Updated: February 26, 2018

=== Dolomiti Energia Trento ===
Dolomiti Energia Trento roster
Players
Coaches

| Pos. | No. | Nat. | Name | Ht. | Wt. | Age |
|---|---|---|---|---|---|---|
| SG | 0 | (Netherlands) | Franke, Yannick | 1.96 m (6 ft 5 in) | 84 kg (185 lb) | 28 – 21 May 1996 |
| G/F | 2 | (United States) | Sutton, Dominique | 1.96 m (6 ft 5 in) | 96 kg (212 lb) | 38 – 20 October 1986 |
| F | 4 | (Latvia) | Siliņš, Ojārs | 2.04 m (6 ft 8 in) | 98 kg (216 lb) | 31 – 20 July 1993 |
| PG | 10 | (Italy) | Forray, Andrés Pablo (C) | 1.87 m (6 ft 2 in) | 87 kg (192 lb) | 38 – 20 March 1986 |
| G/F | 11 | (Italy) | Conti, Luca | 1.96 m (6 ft 5 in) | 87 kg (192 lb) | 24 – 20 December 2000 |
| SG | 12 | (Italy) | Flaccadori, Diego (injured) | 1.95 m (6 ft 5 in) | 80 kg (176 lb) | 28 – 5 April 1996 |
| PG | 13 | (Mexico) | Gutiérrez, Jorge | 1.91 m (6 ft 3 in) | 88 kg (194 lb) | 36 – 27 December 1988 |
| F | 15 | (Portugal) | Gomes, João | 2.01 m (6 ft 7 in) | 100 kg (220 lb) | 40 – 5 February 1985 |
| F/C | 22 | (United States) | Hogue, Dustin | 1.98 m (6 ft 6 in) | 100 kg (220 lb) | 32 – 30 June 1992 |
| C | 25 | (Italy) | Lechthaler, Luca | 2.06 m (6 ft 9 in) | 105 kg (231 lb) | 39 – 23 February 1986 |
| F | 31 | (Denmark) | Shields, Shavon | 2.01 m (6 ft 7 in) | 102 kg (225 lb) | 30 – 5 June 1994 |

Head coach

- (Italy) Maurizio Buscaglia

Assistant coach(es)

- (Italy) Vincenzo Cavazzana
- (Italy) Davide Dusmet
- (Italy) Emanuele Molin

Athletic trainer(s)

- (Italy) Christian Verona

Team manager

- (Italy) Salvatore Trainotti

Legend

- (C) Team captain
- Injured

- Roster
Updated: 31 May 2018
