= 2020–21 Aquila Basket Trento season =

Italian basketball season

Aquila Basket Trento
2020-21 season
- Owner: Aquila Basket Trento 2013 S.R.L.
- President: Luigi Longhi
- Head coach: Emanuele Molin
- Arena: PalaTrento
- LBA: 8th of 15
- Playoffs: Quarterfinals
- EuroCup: Top 16 (3rd of 4)
- Supercup: Group stage (4th of 4)

The 2020–21 season is Aquila Basket Trento's 26th in existence and the club's 8th consecutive season in the top tier Italian basketball.

== Kit ==
Supplier: Nike / Sponsor: Dolomiti Energia

=== EuroCup ===
Home	Away

=== Serie A ===
Home	Away

== Players ==
=== Current roster ===
Dolomiti Energia Trento roster
Players
Coaches

Pos.	No.	Nat.	Name	Ht.	Wt.	Age
SF	1	(United States)	Martin, Kelvin	1.96 m (6 ft 5 in)	94 kg (207 lb)	37 – 10 September 1989
PF	7	(Italy)	Pascolo, Davide	2.02 m (6 ft 8 in)	88 kg (194 lb)	35 – 14 December 1990
G/F	8	(Italy)	Conti, Luca	1.96 m (6 ft 5 in)	84 kg (185 lb)	25 – 20 December 2000
PG	9	(Puerto Rico)	Browne, Gary	1.85 m (6 ft 1 in)	88 kg (194 lb)	33 – 24 March 1993
PG	10	(Argentina)	Forray, Andrés Pablo (C)	1.87 m (6 ft 2 in)	85 kg (187 lb)	40 – 20 March 1986
SG	11	(United States)	Sanders, Victor	1.96 m (6 ft 5 in)	88 kg (194 lb)	31 – 16 February 1995
F/C	14	(Italy)	Mezzanotte, Andrea	2.08 m (6 ft 10 in)	89 kg (196 lb)	28 – 8 April 1998
SG	20	(United States)	Morgan, Jeremy	1.96 m (6 ft 5 in)	88 kg (194 lb)	31 – 8 May 1995
C	22	(United States)	Williams, JaCorey	2.03 m (6 ft 8 in)	102 kg (225 lb)	32 – 12 June 1994
C	23	(Italy)	Ladurner, Maximilian	2.07 m (6 ft 9 in)	95 kg (209 lb)	24 – 6 December 2001
C	25	(Italy)	Lechthaler, Luca	2.07 m (6 ft 9 in)	115 kg (254 lb)	40 – 23 February 1986
PF	32	(United States)	Maye, Luke	2.03 m (6 ft 8 in)	109 kg (240 lb)	29 – 7 March 1997

Head coach

- (Italy) Emanuele Molin

Assistant coach(es)

- (Italy) Davide Dusmet

Legend

- (C) Team captain
- Injured

- Roster
Updated: 16 May 2021

Note: Flags indicate national team eligibility at FIBA-sanctioned events. Players may hold other non-FIBA nationalities not displayed.

=== Depth chart ===
Pos.	Starting 5	Bench 1	Bench 2
C	JaCorey Williams	Maximilian Ladurner	Luca Lechthaler
PF	Luke Maye	Andrea Mezzanotte	Davide Pascolo
SF	Kelvin Martin	Luca Conti
SG	Jeremy Morgan	Victor Sanders
PG	Gary Browne	Andrés Pablo Forray

6+6 format (colours: Italian or homegrown players; foreign players; young players)

=== Squad changes ===
==== In ====
No.	Pos.	Nat.	Name	Age	Moving from		Type	Ends	Transfer fee	Date	Source
11	SG	(United States)	Victor Sanders	25	Antwerp Giants	(Belgium)	1 year	June 2021	Free	2 July 2020	
20	SG	(United States)	Jeremy Morgan	25	Crailsheim Merlins	(Germany)	1 year	June 2021	Free	4 July 2020	
8	SF	(Italy)	Luca Conti	19	Poderosa Montegranaro	(Italy)	1 year	June 2021	Free	6 July 2020	
9	SF	(Puerto Rico)	Gary Browne	27	Darüşşafaka	(Turkey)	1 year	June 2021	Free	14 July 2020	
32	F	(United States)	Luke Maye	23	Wisconsin Herd	(United States)	1 year	June 2021	Free	18 July 2020	
22	C	(United States)	JaCorey Williams	26	PAOK	(Greece)	1 year	June 2021	Free	1 August 2020	
1	SF	(United States)	Kelvin Martin	30	New Basket Brindisi	(Italy)	1 year	June 2021	Free	14 August 2020	

==== Out ====
No.	Pos.	Nat.	Name	Age	Moving to		Type	Transfer fee	Date	Source
13	PG	(United States)	Justin Knox	27	Wonju DB Promy	(South Korea)	End of contract	Free	16 June 2020	
20	G	(Italy)	Alessandro Voltolini	18	Assigeco Piacenza	(Italy)	On loan	Free	16 June 2020	
0	F	(United States)	Rashard Kelly	24	Gaziantep Basketbol	(Turkey)	End of contract	Free	1 July 2020	
1	SG	(United States)	James Blackmon	25	Beşiktaş	(Turkey)	End of contract	Free	1 July 2020	
4	PG	(United States) (Philippines)	Aaron Craft	29	Retired		End of contract	Free	1 July 2020	
9	SG	(Italy)	Fabio Mian	28	Vanoli Cremona	(Italy)	End of contract	Free	1 July 2020	
34	SG	(Italy) (Switzerland)	Matteo Picarelli	19	UMBC Retrievers	(United States)	Mutual consent	Free	1 July 2020	
5	SF	(Italy)	Alessandro Gentile	27	Estudiantes	(Spain)	Mutual consent	Undisclosed	6 July 2020	

==== Confirmed ====
No.	Pos.	Nat.	Name	Age	Moving from		Type	Ends	Transfer fee	Date	Source
10	PG	(Argentina) (Italy)	Andrés Pablo Forray	34	Fulgor Libertas Forlì	(Italy)	9 + 3 year	June 2023	Free	22 February 2011	
25	C	(Italy)	Luca Lechthaler	34	Scandone Avellino	(Italy)	5 + 1 years	June 2021	Free	6 August 2015	
14	F/C	(Italy)	Andrea Mezzanotte	22	Blu Basket Treviglio	(Italy)	4 year	June 2022	Free	23 July 2018	
7	PF	(Italy)	Davide Pascolo	29	Olimpia Milano	(Italy)	2 + 3 year	June 2023	Free	24 July 2018	

==== Coach ====
Nat.	Name	Age.	Previous team		Type	Ends	Start Date	Status	End Date
(Italy)	Emanuele Molin	60	Aquila Basket Trento (assistant)	(Italy)	1 year	June 2021	31 January 2021	Active	
(Italy)	Nicola Brienza	39	Pallacanestro Cantù	(Italy)	3 years	June 2022	10 June 2019	sacked	31 January 2021

== Competitions ==
=== Supercup ===
Pos	Team	Pld	W	L	PF	PA	PD	Qualification
1	Umana Reyer Venezia	6	4	2	462	434	+28	Advance to Final Four
2	De' Longhi Treviso	6	3	3	475	459	+16	
3	Allianz Pallacanestro Trieste	6	3	3	428	467	−39	
4	Dolomiti Energia Trento	6	2	4	467	472	−5	

Source: LegaBasket Serie A
Rules for classification: All points scored in extra period(s) were not counted in the standings, nor for any tie-break situation.

=== Serie A ===
==== Regular season ====
Pos	Team	Pld	W	L	PF	PA	PD	Qualification
6	De' Longhi Treviso	28	14	14	2353	2468	−115	Qualification to Playoffs
7	Allianz Pallacanestro Trieste	28	14	14	2253	2249	+4	Qualification to Playoffs
8	Dolomiti Energia Trento	28	13	15	2191	2228	−37	Qualification to Playoffs
9	Germani Basket Brescia	28	11	17	2299	2389	−90	
10	Vanoli Cremona	28	11	17	2370	2395	−25	

Updated to match(es) played on 10 May 2021. Source: LBA

==== Playoffs ====
===== Quarterfinals =====
13 May 2021 Game 1	AX Armani Exchange Milano	88–62 (Series: 1-0)	Aquila Basket Trento	Assago (Milan)
17:30 (CET)	Scoring by quarter: 26-20, 23-14, 23-17, 26-11
Rai Sport, Eurosport Player	Pts: Shields 16; Rebs: Moraschini, Hines 7 Asts: Rodríguez, Shields, Hines 4 PIR: Hines 23	Boxscore	Pts: Browne 16; Rebs: Williams 6 Asts: Sanders 5 PIR: Browne 17	Arena: Mediolanum Forum; Referees: Manuel Mazzoni, Andrea Bongiorni, Gianluca Capotorto

14 May 2021 Game 2	AX Armani Exchange Milano	93–79 (Series: 2-0)	Aquila Basket Trento	Assago (Milan)
19:00 (CET)	Scoring by quarter: 23-21, 26-14, 24-18, 20-26
Eurosport 2, Eurosport Player	Pts: LeDay 19; Rebs: Biligha 6 Asts: Rodríguez 7 PIR: Moraschini, Rodríguez 21	Boxscore	Pts: Morgan 17; Rebs: Williams 8 Asts: Browne 6 PIR: Browne, Morgan, Williams 18	Arena: Mediolanum Forum; Referees: Roberto Begnis, Lorenzo Baldini, Martino Galasso

16 May 2021 Game 3	Aquila Basket Trento	65–74 (Series: 0-3)	AX Armani Exchange Milano	Trento
20:45 (CET)	Scoring by quarter: 16-20, 13-16, 16-16, 20-22
Eurosport 2, Eurosport Player	Pts: Williams 16; Rebs: Martin, Williams 8 Asts: Sanders 4 PIR: Martin, Williams 17	Boxscore	Pts: Punter 14; Rebs: Moraschini 9 Asts: Rodríguez, Delaney 4 PIR: Moraschini 24	Arena: BLM Group Arena; Referees: Saverio Lanzarini, Mark Bartoli, Christian Borgo

=== Eurocup ===
==== Regular season ====
Pos	Team	Pld	W	L	PF	PA	PD	Qualification
1	(Spain) Herbalife Gran Canaria	10	8	2	831	765	+66	Advance to Top 16
2	(Slovenia) Cedevita Olimpija	10	7	3	838	737	+101	Advance to Top 16
3	(Italy) Dolomiti Energia Trento	10	6	4	738	713	+25	Advance to Top 16
4	(France) Nanterre 92	10	4	6	791	806	−15	Advance to Top 16
5	(Turkey) Frutti Extra Bursaspor	10	3	7	853	907	−54	
6	(Greece) Promitheas	10	2	8	757	880	−123	

Source: EuroCup Basketball
Rules for classification: All points scored in extra period(s) were not counted in the standings, nor for any tie-break situation.

==== Top 16 ====
Pos	Team	Pld	W	L	PF	PA	PD	Qualification
1	(France) Metropolitans 92	6	4	2	435	441	−6	Advance to quarterfinals
2	(Russia) Lokomotiv Kuban	6	3	3	489	464	+25	Advance to quarterfinals
3	(Italy) Dolomiti Energia Trento	6	3	3	441	446	−5	
4	(Serbia) Partizan NIS	6	2	4	395	409	−14	

Source: EuroCup Basketball
Rules for classification: All points scored in extra period(s) were not counted in the standings, nor for any tie-break situation.

== See also ==
- 2020–21 LBA season
- 2020–21 EuroCup Basketball
- 2020 Italian Basketball Supercup
