= 2018 LBA Playoffs =

Tournament details
- Country: Italy
- Dates: 12 May–15 June 2018
- Teams: 8
- Defending champions: Umana Reyer Venezia

Final positions
- Champions: EA7 Emporio Armani Milano
- Runners-up: Dolomiti Energia Trento
- Semifinalists: Umana Reyer Venezia; Germani Basket Brescia

Tournament statistics
- Attendance: 137,682 (5,911 per match)

The 2018 LBA Playoffs, officially known as the 2018 LBA Playoff, were the final phase of the 2017–18 LBA season. The Playoffs started on May 12, 2018, and ended on June 15, 2018, with the Finals.

Umana Reyer Venezia were the defending champions.

EA7 Emporio Armani Milano won their 28th title by beating Dolomiti Energia Trento in game 6 of the finals.

== Qualified teams ==
The eight first qualified teams after the end of the regular season qualified to the playoffs.

Pos	Team	Pld	W	L	PF	PA	PD	Qualification
1	Umana Reyer Venezia	30	23	7	2481	2364	+117	Seeded teams
2	EA7 Emporio Armani Milano	30	22	8	2463	2244	+219	Seeded teams
3	Germani Basket Brescia	30	20	10	2397	2282	+115	Seeded teams
4	Sidigas Avellino	30	20	10	2492	2313	+179	Seeded teams
5	Dolomiti Energia Trento	30	18	12	2423	2304	+119	Non-seeded teams
6	Openjobmetis Varese	30	16	14	2355	2271	+84	Non-seeded teams
7	Red October Cantù	30	16	14	2619	2614	+5	Non-seeded teams
8	Vanoli Cremona	30	15	15	2554	2495	+59	Non-seeded teams

Source: Legabasket

== Bracket ==
As of 15 June 2018.

Quarterfinals
1	Reyer Venezia	3
8	Vanoli Cremona	0
4	Sidigas Avellino	1
5	Dolomiti Energia Trento	3
2	EA7 Emporio Armani Milano	3
7	Red October Cantù	0
3	Germani Basket Brescia	3
6	Openjobmetis Varese	0

Semifinals
1	Umana Reyer Venezia	1
5	Dolomiti Energia Trento	3
2	EA7 Emporio Armani Milano	3
3	Germani Basket Brescia	1

Finals
5	Dolomiti Energia Trento	2
2	EA7 Emporio Armani Milano	4

== Quarterfinals ==
The quarterfinals were played in a best of five format.

=== EA7 Emporio Armani Milano v Red October Cantù ===
12 May 2018	EA7 Emporio Armani Milano	105–73 (Series: 1–0)	Red October Cantù	Assago
20:30 (CEST)	Scoring by quarter: 33–18, 22–21, 29–19, 21–15
Eurosport	Pts: Goudelock 17; Rebs: Tarczewski 10; Asts: Cinciarini 6 PIR: Cinciarini 23	Boxscore	Pts: Smith 17; Rebs: Burns 9 Asts: Culpepper 4 PIR: Smith 14	Arena: Mediolanum Forum; Referees: Saverio Lanzarini, Gianluca Sardella, Guido Federico Di Francesco

14 May 2018	EA7 Emporio Armani Milano	87–75 (Series: 2–0)	Red October Cantù	Assago
20:30 (CEST)	Scoring by quarter: 24–17, 30–22, 14–16, 19–20
Eurosport	Pts: Bertāns 16; Rebs: Tarczewski 9 Asts: Cinciarini 5 PIR: Tarczewski 23	Boxscore	Pts: Culpepper 24; Rebs: Burns 11; Asts: Smith 6 PIR: Culpepper 24	Arena: Mediolanum Forum; Referees: Roberto Begnis, Lorenzo Baldini, Denis Quarta

16 May 2018	Red October Cantù	65–74 (Series: 0–3)	EA7 Emporio Armani Milano	Desio
20:30 (CEST)	Scoring by quarter: 14–15, 13–28, 18–12, 20–19
Eurosport	Pts: Culpepper 18; Rebs: Thomas 8 Asts: Smith 5 PIR: Cournooh, Thomas 14	Boxscore	Pts: Goudelock 24; Rebs: Kuzminskas 7 Asts: Jerrells5; PIR: Goudelock 24	Arena: PalaDesio; Referees: Carmelo Paternico', Michele Rossi, Beniamino Manuel Attard

=== Germani Basket Brescia v Openjobmetis Varese ===
12 May 2018	Germani Basket Brescia	68–61 (Series: 1–0)	Openjobmetis Varese	Verona
20:45 (CEST)	Scoring by quarter: 13–20, 18–20, 24–12, 13–9
Rai Sport	Pts: Landry 21; Rebs: Ortner 14; Asts: Vitali 5 PIR: Ortner 18	Boxscore	Pts: Okoye 18; Rebs: Cain 11; Asts: three players PIR: Cain 20	Arena: PalaOlimpia; Referees: Manuel Mazzoni, Alessandro Martolini, Beniamino Manuel Attard

14 May 2018	Germani Basket Brescia	77–75 (Series: 2–0)	Openjobmetis Varese	Brescia
20:45 (CEST)	Scoring by quarter: 14–22, 23–18, 16–20, 24–15
Rai Sport	Pts: Moss 17; Rebs: M. Vitali 6 Asts: L. Vitali 5 PIR: Moss 20	Boxscore	Pts: Avramović 20; Rebs: Vene, Cain 7 Asts: Cain, Tambone 5 PIR: Vene 26	Arena: PalaGeorge; Referees: Tolga Sahin, Mark Bartoli, Luca Weidmann

16 May 2018	Openjobmetis Varese	64–69(OT) (Series: 0–3)	Germani Basket Brescia	Varese
20:45 (CEST)	Scoring by quarter: 8–14, 18–9, 24–20, 10–17, Overtime: 4–9
Rai Sport	Pts: Avramović 24; Rebs: Cain 14; Asts: Vene, Tambone 3 PIR: Cain 25	Boxscore	Pts: Moore 17; Rebs: Landry, Vitali 10; Asts: Vitali 4 PIR: Cotton 23	Arena: PalA2A; Referees: Enrico Sabetta, Maurizio Biggi, Emanuele Aronne

=== Umana Reyer Venezia v Vanoli Cremona ===
13 May 2018	Umana Reyer Venezia	87–77 (Series: 1–0)	Vanoli Cremona	Mestre
19:00 (CEST)	Scoring by quarter: 31–20, 21–21, 16–22, 19–14
Eurosport	Pts: Perić 23; Rebs: Daye 8 Asts: De Nicolao 4 PIR: Perić 33	Boxscore	Pts: Johnson-Odom 15; Rebs: Martin 6 Asts: T. Diener, D. Diener 3 PIR: T. Diener 21	Arena: Taliercio; Referees: Enrico Sabetta, Maurizio Biggi, Valerio Grigioni

15 May 2018	Umana Reyer Venezia	108–76 (Series: 2–0)	Vanoli Cremona	Mestre
20:30 (CEST)	Scoring by quarter: 24–12, 26–30, 26–20, 32–14
Eurosport	Pts: Perić 19; Rebs: Perić 6 Asts: Tonut, Haynes 4 PIR: Perić 24	Boxscore	Pts: Johnson-Odom 22; Rebs: Martin 7 Asts: T. Diener 4 PIR: Johnson-Odom 22	Arena: Taliercio; Referees: Carmelo Lo Guzzo, Alessandro Vicino, Denny Borgioni

17 May 2018	Vanoli Cremona	72–99 (Series: 0–3)	Umana Reyer Venezia	Cremona
20:30 (CEST)	Scoring by quarter: 15–25, 17–22, 23–23, 17–29
Eurosport	Pts: Johnson-Odom 21; Rebs: Milbourne 6 Asts: Ruzzier 4 PIR: Johnson-Odom 17	Boxscore	Pts: Daye 19; Rebs: Daye 9 Asts: Haynes 5 PIR: Daye 27	Arena: PalaRadi; Referees: Manuel Mazzoni, Gianluca Sardella, Evangelista Caiazza

=== Sidigas Avellino v Dolomiti Energia Trento ===
13 May 2018	Sidigas Avellino	77–79 (Series: 0–1)	Dolomiti Energia Trento	Avellino
20:45 (CEST)	Scoring by quarter: 17–18, 21–17, 20–13, 19–31
Rai Sport	Pts: Wells 19; Rebs: Renfroe 5 Asts: Rich, Renfroe 4 PIR: Wells 21	Boxscore	Pts: Sutton 22; Rebs: three players 6 Asts: Sutton 3 PIR: Sutton 26	Arena: PalaDelMauro; Referees: Carmelo Paternico', Michele Rossi, Emanuele Aronne

15 May 2018	Sidigas Avellino	80–59 (Series: 1–1)	Dolomiti Energia Trento	Avellino
20:45 (CEST)	Scoring by quarter: 24–15, 20–18, 16–10, 20–16
Rai Sport	Pts: Fesenko 20; Rebs: Fesenko 10; Asts: Wells 8 PIR: Fesenko 32	Boxscore	Pts: Gutiérrez, Shields 10; Rebs: Sutton 10; Asts: Forray 3 PIR: Hogue 13	Arena: PalaDelMauro; Referees: Dino Seghetti, Massimiliano Filippini, Gabriele Bettini

17 May 2018	Dolomiti Energia Trento	88–80 (Series: 2–1)	Sidigas Avellino	Trento
20:45 (CEST)	Scoring by quarter: 17–21, 20–20, 19–17, 32–22
Rai Sport	Pts: Hogue 20; Rebs: Shields 6 Asts: Gutiérrez 4 PIR: Hogue 24	Boxscore	Pts: Rich 15; Rebs: Fesenko 8 Asts: Fesenko 4 PIR: Fesenko 12	Arena: PalaTrento; Referees: Roberto Begnis, Alessandro Martolini, Guido Federico Di Francesco

19 May 2018	Dolomiti Energia Trento	84–68 (Series: 3–1)	Sidigas Avellino	Trento
20:45 (CEST)	Scoring by quarter: 21–20, 21–17, 24–19, 18–12
Rai Sport	Pts: three players 17; Rebs: Hogue 12; Asts: Shields 4 PIR: Hogue 29	Boxscore	Pts: Filloy 13; Rebs: Fesenko 7 Asts: Renfroe 2 PIR: Scrubb 13	Arena: PalaTrento; Referees: Saverio LANZARINI - Mark BARTOLI - Valerio GRIGIONI

== Semifinals ==
The semifinals were played in a best of five format.

=== EA7 Emporio Armani Milano v Germani Basket Brescia ===
24 May 2018	EA7 Emporio Armani Milano	82–85 (Series: 0–1)	Germani Basket Brescia	Assago
20:45 (CEST)	Scoring by quarter: 13–21, 23–22, 29–27, 17–15
Eurosport; Rai Sport	Pts: Micov 17; Rebs: Tarczewski 8 Asts: Micov, Cinciarini 4 PIR: Micov 17	Boxscore	Pts: M. Vitali 20; Rebs: Hunt 7 Asts: M. Vitali 6 PIR: M. Vitali 30	Arena: Mediolanum Forum; Referees: Massimiliano Filippini, Luca Weidmann, Gabriele Bettini

26 May 2018	EA7 Emporio Armani Milano	89–68 (Series: 1–1)	Germani Basket Brescia	Assago
20:45 (CEST)	Scoring by quarter: 30–13, 30–18, 14–19, 15–18
Eurosport; Rai Sport	Pts: Goudelock 15; Rebs: Gudaitis 8 Asts: Jerrells 5 PIR: Goudelock, Micov 17	Boxscore	Pts: Hunt 14; Rebs: Hunt, Ortner 5 Asts: Vitali, Ortner 4 PIR: Ortner 13	Arena: Mediolanum Forum; Referees: Dino Seghetti, Carmelo Lo Guzzo, Gianluca Sardella

28 May 2018	Germani Basket Brescia	74–80 (Series: 1–2)	EA7 Emporio Armani Milano	Brescia
20:45 (CEST)	Scoring by quarter: 17–17, 21–19, 17–22, 19–22
Eurosport; Rai Sport	Pts: Landry 19; Rebs: Ortner 9 Asts: Vitali, Moss 4 PIR: Vitali 16	Boxscore	Pts: Goudelock 20; Rebs: Tarczewski 6 Asts: three players 4 PIR: Goudelock 20	Arena: PalaGeorge; Referees: Roberto Begnis, Manuel Mazzoni, Emanuele Aronne

30 May 2018	Germani Basket Brescia	70–76 (Series: 1–3)	EA7 Emporio Armani Milano	Brescia
20:45 (CEST)	Scoring by quarter: 16–25, 17–17, 21–15, 16–19
Eurosport; Rai Sport	Pts: Sacchetti 13; Rebs: Ortner 11; Asts: three players 3 PIR: Ortner 17	Boxscore	Pts: Kuzminskas 24; Rebs: Kuzminskas 8 Asts: Goudelock 4 PIR: Kuzminskas 31	Arena: PalaGeorge; Referees: Saverio Lanzarini, Alessandro Martolini, Denny Borgioni

=== Umana Reyer Venezia v Dolomiti Energia Trento ===
25 May 2018	Umana Reyer Venezia	78–80 (Series: 0–1)	Dolomiti Energia Trento	Mestre
20:45 (CEST)	Scoring by quarter: 25–23, 18–21, 19–18, 16–18
Eurosport; Rai Sport	Pts: Daye 27; Rebs: Daye 9 Asts: Haynes 5 PIR: Daye 31	Boxscore	Pts: Shields 27; Rebs: Sutton 9 Asts: Gutiérrez 4 PIR: Shields 26	Arena: Taliercio; Referees: Tolga Sahin, Lorenzo Baldini, Alessandro Vicino

27 May 2018	Umana Reyer Venezia	80–77 (Series: 1–1)	Dolomiti Energia Trento	Mestre
20:45 (CEST)	Scoring by quarter: 25–13, 19–9, 11–28, 25–27
Eurosport; Rai Sport	Pts: Haynes 26; Rebs: Watt 9 Asts: Haynes, Jenkins 3 PIR: Haynes 29	Boxscore	Pts: Gutiérrez 14; Rebs: Gutiérrez, Shields 6 Asts: Gutiérrez 4 PIR: Gutiérrez 16	Arena: Taliercio; Referees: Enrico Sabetta, Saverio Lanzarini, Michele Rossi

29 May 2018	Dolomiti Energia Trento	81–63 (Series: 2–1)	Umana Reyer Venezia	Trento
20:45 (CEST)	Scoring by quarter: 19–11, 19–22, 20–23, 23–7
Eurosport; Rai Sport	Pts: Sutton 18; Rebs: Gomes, Hogue 10; Asts: Forray 4 PIR: Sutton 24	Boxscore	Pts: Perić 13; Rebs: Jenkins 6 Asts: three players 2 PIR: Jenkins 13	Arena: PalaTrento; Referees: Carmelo Paternico', Maurizio Biggi, Beniamino Manuel Attard

31 May 2018	Dolomiti Energia Trento	84–76 (Series: 3–1)	Umana Reyer Venezia	Trento
20:45 (CEST)	Scoring by quarter: 25–20, 11–21, 26–16, 22–19
Eurosport; Rai Sport	Pts: Hogue, Shields 17; Rebs: Hogue 12; Asts: Forray 6 PIR: Hogue 25	Boxscore	Pts: Johnson 17; Rebs: Watt 7 Asts: Johnson 3 PIR: Watt 16	Arena: PalaTrento; Referees: Massimiliano Filippini, Dino Seghetti, Mark Bartoli

== Finals ==
The finals were played in a best of seven format.

=== EA7 Emporio Armani Milano v Dolomiti Energia Trento ===
5 June 2018	EA7 Emporio Armani Milano	98–85 (Series: 1–0)	Dolomiti Energia Trento	Assago
20:45 (CEST)	Scoring by quarter: 15–12, 32–22, 23–18, 28–33
Eurosport; Rai Sport	Pts: Goudelock 26; Rebs: Tarczewski 9 Asts: Micov 5 PIR: Tarczewski 27	Boxscore	Pts: Shields 31; Rebs: Sutton 7 Asts: Shields 5 PIR: Shields 31	Arena: Mediolanum Forum; Referees: Enrico Sabetta, Saverio Lanzarini, Emanuele Aronne

7 June 2018	EA7 Emporio Armani Milano	90–80 (Series: 2–0)	Dolomiti Energia Trento	Assago
20:45 (CEST)	Scoring by quarter: 27–29, 30–18, 14–14, 19–19
Eurosport; Rai Sport	Pts: Jerrells 27; Rebs: Gudaitis 9 Asts: Micov 3 PIR: Jerrells 24	Boxscore	Pts: Gomes 18; Rebs: Sutton 6 Asts: Shields 5 PIR: Gomes 21	Arena: Mediolanum Forum; Referees: Roberto Begnis, Tolga Sahin, Gianluca Sardella

9 June 2018	Dolomiti Energia Trento	72–65 (Series: 1–2)	EA7 Emporio Armani Milano	Trento
20:45 (CEST)	Scoring by quarter: 17–17, 18–14, 23–17, 14–17
Eurosport; Rai Sport	Pts: Sutton 19; Rebs: three players 10; Asts: Shields 6 PIR: Hogue 25	Boxscore	Pts: Jerrells, Bertāns 13; Rebs: Micov 9 Asts: Cinciarini 5 PIR: Gudaitis 11	Arena: PalaTrento; Referees: Carmelo Paternico', Manuel Mazzoni, Michele Rossi

11 June 2018	Dolomiti Energia Trento	77–74 (Series: 2–2)	EA7 Emporio Armani Milano	Trento
20:45 (CEST)	Scoring by quarter: 11–13, 18–21, 23–21, 25–19
Eurosport; Rai Sport	Pts: Shields 31; Rebs: Shields 8 Asts: Forray 5 PIR: Shields 39	Boxscore	Pts: Goudelock 14; Rebs: Gudaitis 6 Asts: Micov 4 PIR: Micov 15	Arena: PalaTrento; Referees: Dino Seghetti, Carmelo Lo Guzzo, Alessandro Martolini

13 June 2018	EA7 Emporio Armani Milano	91–90 (Series: 3–2)	Dolomiti Energia Trento	Assago
20:45 (CEST)	Scoring by quarter: 31–22, 17–28, 23–16, 20–24
Eurosport; Rai Sport	Pts: Gudaitis, Kuzminskas 19; Rebs: Gudaitis, Tarczewski 6 Asts: Micov 7 PIR: Gudaitis 28	Boxscore	Pts: Shields 27; Rebs: Hogue 9 Asts: three players 4 PIR: Hogue, Shields 23	Arena: Mediolanum Forum; Referees: Saverio Lanzarini, Manuel Mazzoni, Mark Bartoli

15 June 2018	Dolomiti Energia Trento	71–96 (Series: 2–4)	EA7 Emporio Armani Milano	Trento
20:45 (CEST)	Scoring by quarter: 20–25, 13–23, 23–18, 15–30
Eurosport; Rai Sport	Pts: Sutton 15; Rebs: Gomes, Hogue 7 Asts: Sutton, Forray 2 PIR: Forray 19	Boxscore	Pts: Goudelock 21; Rebs: Gudaitis 9 Asts: Jerrells 6 PIR: Goudelock 24	Arena: PalaTrento; Referees: Carmelo Paternoco', Roberto Begnis, Lorenzo Baldini
