= 2017 Italian Basketball Supercup =

2017 Prozis Supercoppa

Tournament details
- Arena: Unieuro Arena; Forlì, Italy
- Dates: 23–24 September 2017

Final positions
- Champions: EA7 Emporio Armani Milano (2nd title)
- Runners-up: Umana Reyer Venezia

Awards and statistics
- MVP: (North Macedonia) Jordan Theodore

The 2017 Italian Basketball Supercup (Italian: Supercoppa di pallacanestro 2017), also called Prozis Supercoppa 2017 for sponsorship reasons, was the 23rd edition of the super cup tournament, organized by the Lega Basket Serie A (LBA).

EA7 Emporio Armani Milano were the defending champions.

EA7 Emporio Armani Milano went to win his 2nd Supercup by beating Umana Reyer Venezia 82–77 in the Finals. Jordan Theodore was named MVP of the competition.

It was played in the Unieuro Arena in Forlì on 23 and 24 September 2017.

== Participant teams ==
As of 22 September 2017, qualified for the tournament were Banco di Sardegna Sassari, EA7 Emporio Armani Milano, Umana Reyer Venezia and Dolomiti Energia Trento.

Team	Qualified as	Appearance
Banco di Sardegna Sassari	Italian Cup runner-up	3rd
Dolomiti Energia Trento	LBA runner-up	1st
EA7 Emporio Armani Milano	Italian Cup champion	5th
Umana Reyer Venezia	LBA champion	1st

== Bracket ==
Semi-finals; 23 September
EA7 Emporio Armani Milano	74
Dolomiti Energia Trento	65
Umana Reyer Venezia	86
Banco di Sardegna Sassari	79

Final; 24 September
EA7 Emporio Armani Milano	82
Umana Reyer Venezia	77

== Semi-finals ==
=== EA7 Emporio Armani Milano vs. Dolomiti Energia Trento ===
23 September 2017	EA7 Emporio Armani Milano	74–65	Dolomiti Energia Trento	Forlì
17:30 (CEST)	Scoring by quarter: 20–13, 19–14, 20–14, 15–21
Eurosport	Pts: Goudelock 24; Rebs: Gudaitis 10; Asts: Theodore 6 PIR: Goudelock 20	Boxscore	Pts: Behanan 13; Rebs: Sutton 7 Asts: Forray 5 PIR: Behanan 19	Arena: Unieuro Arena; Referees: Carmelo Paternicò, Beniamino Manuel Attard, Denny Borgioni

Starters:			Pts	Reb	Ast
PG	25	(North Macedonia) Jordan Theodore	10	5	6
SG	0	(United States) Drew Goudelock	24	5	1
SF	5	(Serbia) Vladimir Micov	8	4	0
PF	24	(France) Amath M'Baye	10	2	1
C	22	(Italy) Marco Cusin	2	2	0
Reserves:					
SG	2	(Italy) Simone Fontecchio	0	0	0
PF	14	(Italy) Davide Pascolo	DNP		
PG	20	(Italy) Andrea Cinciarini	0	0	2
SF	23	(Italy) Awudu Abass	0	0	0
PF	34	(United States) Cory Jefferson	3	2	0
SG	45	(Latvia) Dairis Bertāns	11	1	3
C	77	(Lithuania) Artūras Gudaitis	6	10	0
Head coach:
(Italy) Simone Pianigiani

EA7 Emporio Armani Milano	Dolomiti Energia Trento

Starters:			Pts	Reb	Ast
PG	13	(Mexico) Jorge Gutiérrez	5	0	0
SG	2	(United States) Dominique Sutton	11	7	4
SF	15	(Portugal) João Gomes	5	6	0
PF	31	(United States) Shavon Shields	12	3	0
PF	21	(United States) Chane Behanan	13	8	2
Reserves:					
SG	0	(Netherlands) Yannick Franke	4	1	1
PF	4	(Latvia) Ojārs Siliņš	8	4	0
C	8	(Italy) Filippo Baldi Rossi	2	5	2
PG	10	(Italy) Andrés Pablo Forray	4	2	5
SG	12	(Italy) Diego Flaccadori	1	2	0
PG	14	(Italy) Erik Czumbel	DNP		
C	25	(Italy) Luca Lechthaler	DNP		
Head coach:
(Italy) Maurizio Buscaglia

=== Umana Reyer Venezia vs. Banco di Sardegna Sassari ===
23 September 2017	Umana Reyer Venezia	86–79	Banco di Sardegna Sassari	Forlì
20:45 (CEST)	Scoring by quarter: 15–15, 23–16, 25–26, 23–22
Eurosport	Pts: Perić 21; Rebs: Watt 7 Asts: Jenkins 5 PIR: Perić 19	Boxscore	Pts: Polonara 23; Rebs: Jones 10; Asts: Stipčević 5 PIR: Polonara 25	Arena: Unieuro Arena; Referees: Roberto Begnis, Alessandro Martolini, Fabrizio Paglialunga

Starters:			Pts	Reb	Ast
PG	0	(Georgia (country)) MarQuez Haynes	7	2	4
SG	3	(United States) Dominique Johnson	10	2	4
SF	6	(Greece) Michael Bramos	15	5	1
PF	12	(Croatia) Gediminas Orelik	6	1	0
C	50	(United States) Mitchell Watt	9	7	0
Reserves:					
PF	2	(Croatia) Hrvoje Perić	21	5	1
PG	10	(Italy) Andrea De Nicolao	10	1	2
SG	11	(United States) Michael Jenkins	2	0	5
SG	12	(Italy) Riccardo Bolpin	DNP		
PF	14	(Italy) Tomas Ress	4	3	0
C	19	(Italy) Paul Biligha	2	2	0
SF	30	(Italy) Bruno Cerella	DNP		
Head coach:
(Italy) Walter De Raffaele

Umana Reyer Venezia	Banco di Sardegna Sassari

Starters:			Pts	Reb	Ast
PG	24	(Croatia) Rok Stipčević	17	1	5
SG	21	(Canada) Dyshawn Pierre	14	6	2
SF	20	(United States) Levi Randolph	7	3	4
PF	33	(Italy) Achille Polonara	23	8	1
C	22	(Kosovo) Shawn Jones	13	10	0
Reserves:					
SG	0	(Italy) Marco Spissu	1	2	0
SG	4	(Kosovo) Scott Bamforth	DNP		
C	6	(Croatia) Darko Planinić	2	4	0
SF	8	(Italy) Giacomo Devecchi	2	1	0
PG	25	(United States) Will Hatcher	DNP		
SF	34	(Italy) Andrea Picarelli	DNP		
SF	45	(Brazil) Jonathan Tavernari	0	0	0
Head coach:
(Italy) Federico Pasquini

== Final ==
=== EA7 Emporio Armani Milano vs. Umana Reyer Venezia ===
24 September 2017	EA7 Emporio Armani Milano	82–77	Umana Reyer Venezia	Forlì
18:00 (CEST)	Scoring by quarter: 26–17, 14–22, 18–16, 24–22
Eurosport	Pts: Theodore 29; Rebs: M'Baye 10; Asts: Theodore 5 PIR: Theodore 38	Boxscore	Pts: three players 14; Rebs: Bramos 5 Asts: three players 3 PIR: Bramos 17	Arena: Unieuro Arena; Referees: Carmelo Paternico', Roberto Begnis, Alessandro Martolini

Starters:			Pts	Reb	Ast
PG	25	(North Macedonia) Jordan Theodore	29	7	5
SG	0	(United States) Drew Goudelock	14	1	1
SF	5	(Serbia) Vladimir Micov	4	6	0
PF	24	(France) Amath M'Baye	14	10	0
C	22	(Italy) Marco Cusin	0	0	0
Reserves:					
PF	7	(Italy) Davide Pascolo	DNP		
SG	13	(Italy) Simone Fontecchio	0	0	0
PG	20	(Italy) Andrea Cinciarini	2	2	2
SF	23	(Italy) Awudu Abass	DNP		
PF	34	(United States) Cory Jefferson	0	2	0
SG	45	(Latvia) Dairis Bertāns	3	0	0
C	77	(Lithuania) Artūras Gudaitis	12	8	0
Head coach:
(Italy) Simone Pianigiani

EA7 Emporio Armani Milano	Umana Reyer Venezia

Italian Supercoppa MVP
(North Macedonia) Jordan Theodore
Game rules
Game was played under FIBA rules.

2017 Italian Supercup Winners

EA7 Emporio Armani Milano

Starters:			Pts	Reb	Ast
PG	0	(Georgia (country)) MarQuez Haynes	5	1	3
SG	3	(United States) Dominique Johnson	14	3	1
SF	6	(Greece) Michael Bramos	14	5	2
PF	2	(Croatia) Hrvoje Perić	13	2	3
C	50	(United States) Mitchell Watt	9	2	0
Reserves:					
PG	10	(Italy) Andrea De Nicolao	2	3	1
SG	11	(United States) Michael Jenkins	14	2	3
PF	12	(Lithuania) Gediminas Orelik	4	3	2
SG	13	(Italy) Riccardo Bolpin	DNP		
PF	14	(Italy) Tomas Ress	0	2	0
C	19	(Italy) Paul Biligha	2	1	2
SF	30	(Italy) Bruno Cerella	DNP		
Head coach:
(Italy) Walter De Raffaele

== Sponsors ==
- Prozis (title sponsor)
- PosteMobile (main sponsor)
- Fastweb (technology partner)
- Molten (official ball)
- MyGlass (official partner)
- Panasonic (official partner)
- Citroën (official partner)
- Radio Italia (media partner)
- La Gazzetta dello Sport (media partner)
- Eurosport (media partner)
- Unieuro (official event partner)
- Belfor
- Anthea
- Regione Emilia Romagna
- Comune di Forlì
