= Vladimir Micov =

Serbian basketball player

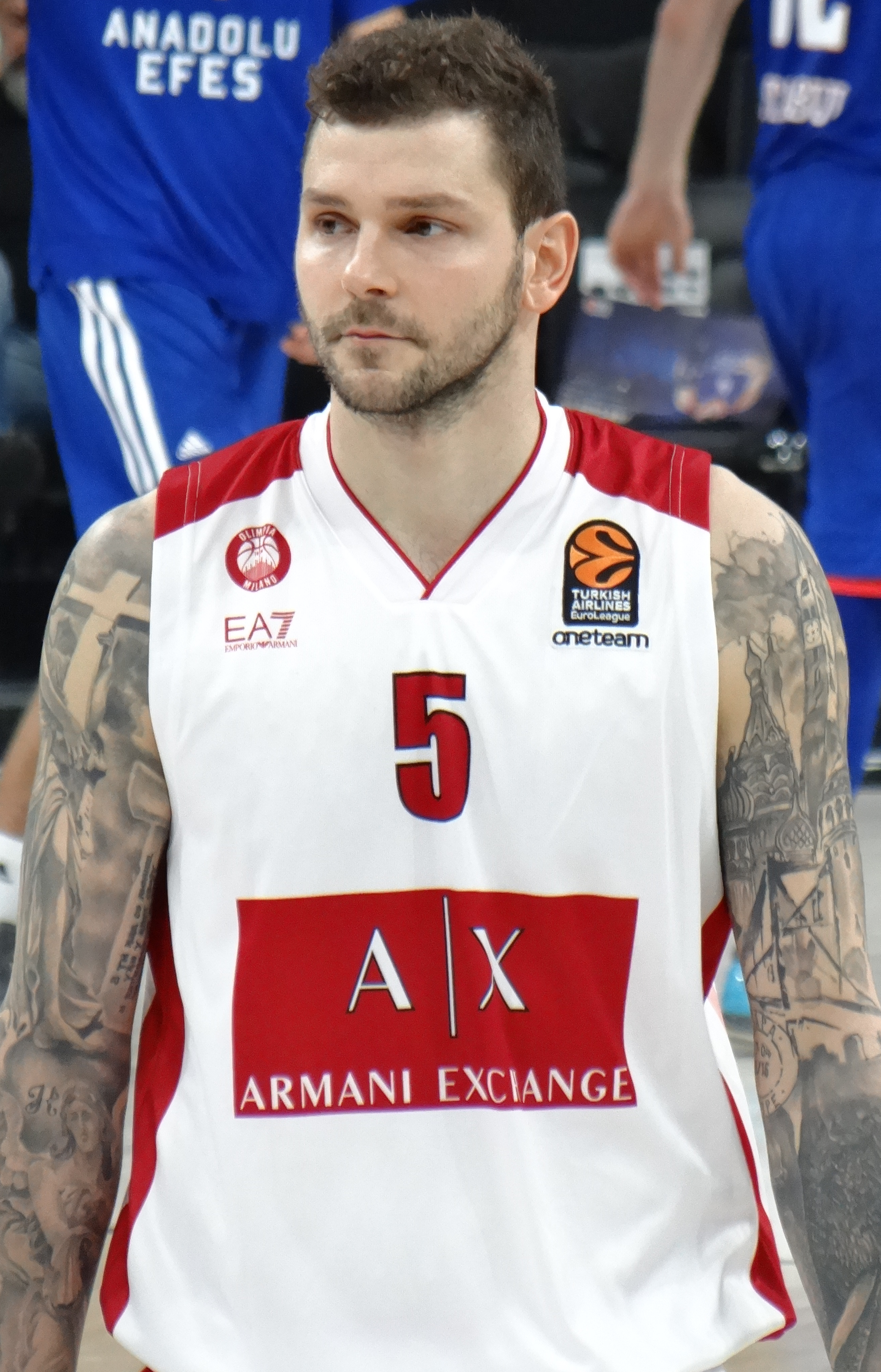
- Micov with Olimpia Milano in November 2017.

Partizan Belgrade
- Title: Director of basketball operations
- League: Serbian SuperLeague; ABA League; EuroLeague

Personal information
- Born: April 16, 1985 (age 41) Belgrade, SR Serbia, SFR Yugoslavia
- Listed height: 2.01 m (6 ft 7 in)
- Listed weight: 101 kg (223 lb)

Career information
- NBA draft: 2007: undrafted
- Playing career: 2001–2022
- Position: Small forward
- Number: 5, 55

Career history
- 2001–2002: Beopetrol
- 2002–2003: Crvena zvezda (youth)
- 2003–2004: OKK Beograd
- 2004–2005: Lavovi 063
- 2005–2009: Budućnost
- 2007: →Partizan
- 2009: Panionios
- 2009–2010: Baskonia
- 2010–2012: Cantù
- 2012–2014: CSKA Moscow
- 2014–2017: Galatasaray
- 2017–2021: Olimpia Milano
- 2021–2022: Buducnost

Career highlights
- EuroCup champion (2016); All-EuroCup First Team (2016); Lega Serie A champion (2018); Italian Cup winner (2021); 3× Italian Supercup winner (2017, 2018, 2020); Italian Supercup MVP (2018); 2× VTB League champion (2013, 2014); Russian League champion (2013); Serbian League champion (2007); 3× Montenegrin League champion (2008, 2009, 2022); 4× Montenegrin Cup winner (2007–2009, 2022)
Medals
Men's basketball
Representing Serbia and Montenegro
U20 European Championship
| Bronze medal – third place | 2005 Russia | Under-20 |
European Championship for Cadets
| Gold medal – first place | 2001 Latvia | Under-16 |

Vladimir Micov (Serbian Cyrillic: Владимир Мицов, born April 16, 1985) is a Serbian basketball executive and former professional basketball player, who is currently the director of basketball operations for Partizan of the Serbian SuperLeague, the ABA League, and the EuroLeague. Standing at a height of 2.03 m (6 ft 8 in), he mainly played as a small forward.

== Professional career ==
=== 2001–2009 ===
Micov played for Beopetrol in the second-tier IB Men's League in the 2001–02 season. He joined Crvena zvezda for the 2002–03 season, but would only play for their youth team.

Micov spent the 2003–04 season with OKK Beograd. He then moved to Lavovi 063 in the 2004–05 season. He joined Budućnost Podgorica for the 2005–06 season. He moved on a two-month loan to Partizan in March 2007. He won the Serbian League championship with Partizan in 2007.

He then returned to Budućnost Podgorica for the 2007–08 season.

=== 2009–2012 ===
In 2009, he joined the Greek Basket League club Panionios.

He then moved to the Spanish ACB League club Caja Laboral Baskonia. In January 2010, he joined the Italian League team Pallacanestro Cantù.

=== CSKA Moscow (2012–2014) ===
In July 2012, he signed a one-year deal, with an option for a second year, with the Russian team PBC CSKA Moscow. In June 2013, CSKA decided not to use the out option on his contract, and thus kept him in the club for one more season. In July 2014, his contract with CSKA expired, and he became a free agent.

=== Galatasaray (2014–2017) ===
On July 14, 2014, he signed with the Turkish team Galatasaray. On June 15, 2015, he signed a two-year contract extension with the club. In the 2015–16 Eurocup season, he was named to the All-EuroCup First Team. Galatasaray then won the EuroCup championship, later that same season.

=== Olimpia Milano (2017–2021) ===
On July 10, 2017, Micov signed with Italian club Olimpia Milano. In 2017–18 LBA season, Olimpia Milano won the championship after 4–2 record in the 2018 LBA Finals over Trento. Over 26 league games, Micov averaged 11.7 points and 3.2 rebounds, while shooting 45.8% from the field. In 2017–18 EuroLeague season, he averaged 10.9 points and 2.6 rebounds over 29 games.

On September 30, 2018, Micov was named MVP of the 2018 Italian Supercup. In 2018–19 season, Olimpia Milano secured the first position in the regular season of Italian League, but was stopped with 3–0 in the semifinal series by Dinamo Sassari. Micov averaged 9.7 points, 2.7 rebounds and 2 assists over 32 games of the Italian League. In 2018–19 EuroLeague, he averaged 13.9 points, 3.2 rebounds and 2.5 assists over 30 games.

On July 2, 2019, Micov signed a two-year contract extension with Olimpia Milano.

On June 26, 2021, Micov officially parted ways with the Italian club after four seasons.

=== Return to Budućnost (2021–2022) ===
On July 16, 2021, Micov signed a one-year contract with Buducnost the Montenegrin Prva A Liga and the ABA League. In the last season of his professional career, he averaged 7.3 points on 37.9% shooting from the field, 2.4 rebounds and 1.2 assists over 27 games.

On July 10, 2022, Micov announced his retirement from professional basketball.

== National team career ==
=== Youth teams ===
Micov won the gold medal at the 2001 FIBA Europe Under-16 Championship as a member of the FR Yugoslavia youth national team.

He won the bronze medal at the 2005 FIBA Europe Under-20 Championship, as a member of the Serbia and Montenegro junior (under-20) national team.

=== Senior ===
Micov's breakthrough in the senior Serbian national team was set back by injuries, but he was eventually a part of the preliminary Serbia national squad during training camp for the 2014 FIBA Basketball World Cup. The 29-year-old was widely expected to make the team's final roster cut, however, during the last preparation friendly game, against New Zealand, Micov got into a mid-game argument with Serbian head coach Aleksandar Đorđević, that led to Đorđević taking Micov out of the game, and later expelling him from the bench. At the post-game press conference, the Serbia coach announced that, "Micov's short career in the national squad has ended", with Micov later saying to the media that he read the coach's words, and that he accepted his decision, while also stating that Đorđević was, "maybe too nervous".

In July 2022, Micov revealed that he had declined to play for Montenegro or North Macedonia, following his expulsion from Serbia national team.

== Career statistics ==
Legend
| GP | Games played | GS | Games started | MPG | Minutes per game |
| FG% | Field-goal percentage | 3P% | 3-point field-goal percentage | FT% | Free-throw percentage |
| RPG | Rebounds per game | APG | Assists per game | SPG | Steals per game |
| BPG | Blocks per game | PPG | Points per game | PIR | Performance index rating |
| **Bold** | Career high |

=== EuroLeague ===
| * | Led the league |

| Year | Team | GP | GS | MPG | FG% | 3P% | FT% | RPG | APG | SPG | BPG | PPG | PIR |
|---|---|---|---|---|---|---|---|---|---|---|---|---|---|
| 2009–10 | Baskonia | 7 | 2 | 15.7 | **.647** | **.500** | .455 | 2.9 | .9 | .1 | — | 4.1 | 6.9 |
| 2011–12 | Cantù | 14 | 14 | 28.8 | .408 | .394 | **.857** | **4.1** | **3.2** | **1.1** | **.4** | 10.4 | 12.1 |
| 2012–13 | CSKA Moscow | 30 | 7 | 21.9 | .437 | .420 | .607 | 2.7 | 1.7 | .6 | .2 | 7.6 | 7.0 |
| 2013–14 | CSKA Moscow | **31*** | 10 | 20.7 | .464 | .488 | .778 | 2.9 | 1.3 | .5 | .2 | 7.7 | 8.3 |
| 2014–15 | Galatasaray | 20 | 20 | 28.3 | .395 | .311 | .843 | 3.0 | 2.3 | .7 | .1 | 9.9 | 9.7 |
| 2016–17 | Galatasaray | 29 | 26 | 29.1 | .420 | .432 | .769 | 3.6 | 2.4 | .8 | .1 | 11.2 | 11.4 |
| 2017–18 | Milano | 29 | 28 | 27.5 | .481 | .443 | .780 | 2.6 | 2.2 | .6 | .1 | 10.9 | 11.2 |
| 2018–19 | Milano | 30 | **30** | **31.3** | .456 | .394 | .790 | 3.2 | 2.5 | **1.1** | .1 | **13.9** | **13.7** |
| 2019–20 | Milano | 26 | 25 | 27.6 | .465 | .410 | .804 | 3.3 | 2.2 | .7 | .1 | 12.1 | 12.0 |
| 2020–21 | Milano | 30 | 20 | 19.1 | .486 | .458 | .750 | 1.6 | 1.0 | .6 | .1 | 6.1 | 5.4 |
| Career | | 246 | 182 | 25.4 | .449 | .419 | .776 | 2.9 | 2.0 | .7 | .1 | 9.7 | 9.8 |

=== Domestic Leagues ===
| Year | Team | League | GP | MPG | FG% | 3P% | FT% | RPG | APG | SPG | BPG | PPG |
|---|---|---|---|---|---|---|---|---|---|---|---|---|
| 2003–04 | (Federal Republic of Yugoslavia) OKK Beograd | Serbia and Montenegro League | 8 | 6.8 | 33.3% | 40.0% | 60.0% | 1.0 | 0.6 | 0.6 | 0.0 | 1.5 |
| 2004–05 | (Federal Republic of Yugoslavia) Lavovi 063 | Serbia and Montenegro League | 1 | 8.0 | 100% | - | 50.0% | 1.0 | 0.0 | 0.0 | 0.0 | 5.0 |
| 2005–06 | (Federal Republic of Yugoslavia) Budućnost | Serbia and Montenegro League | 25 | 29.6 | 53.0% | 30.1% | 54.8% | 4.3 | 1.8 | 1.3 | 0.1 | 8.9 |
| 2006-07 | (Montenegro) Budućnost | ABA League | 26 | 32.1 | 50.7% | 35.0% | 67.5% | 5.0 | 1.8 | 2.2 | 0.1 | 10.5 |
| 2007-08 | (Montenegro) Budućnost | ABA League | 29 | 31.7 | 49.4% | 25.8% | 68.8% | 4.2 | 3.0 | 1.3 | 0.2 | 12.4 |
| 2008–09 | (Montenegro) Budućnost | ABA League | 26 | 31.4 | 49.5% | 28.3% | 75.0% | 4.2 | 2.7 | 2.1 | 0.2 | 13.1 |
| 2008–09 | (Greece) Panionios | Greek Basket League | 6 | 29.4 | 54.0% | 70.0% | 58.3% | 4.2 | 1.2 | 0.7 | 0.0 | 9.0 |
| 2009–10 | (Spain) Baskonia | Liga ACB | 13 | 12.9 | 40.6% | 18.2% | 75.0% | 1.3 | 0.5 | 0.6 | 0.0 | 2.6 |
| 2009–10 | (Italy) NGC Medical Cantù | Serie A | 23 | 28.7 | 45.5% | 41.8% | 72.9% | 3.8 | 2.7 | 2.0 | 0.1 | 11.5 |
| 2010–11 | (Italy) Bennet Cantù | Serie A | 42 | 28.4 | 48.9% | 36.3% | 69.4% | 4.3 | 2.2 | 1.4 | 0.1 | 10.2 |
| 2011–12 | (Italy) Bennet Cantù | Serie A | 25 | 24.7 | 43.6% | 41.2% | 82.3% | 3.7 | 2.4 | 0.7 | 0.1 | 10.2 |
| 2012–13 | (Russia) CSKA Moscow | VTB League | 31 | 22.0 | 43.6% | 38.1% | 67.1% | 3.1 | 1.4 | 0.6 | 0.1 | 8.6 |
| 2013–14 | (Russia) CSKA Moscow | VTB League | 16 | 23.9 | 47.3% | 43.1% | 78.6% | 2.8 | 1.8 | 0.7 | 0.1 | 10.1 |
| 2014–15 | (Turkey) Galatasaray | Basketbol Süper Ligi | 28 | 30.9 | 47.2% | 41.9% | 85.7% | 3.4 | 3.1 | 1.2 | 0.2 | 11.3 |
| 2015–16 | (Turkey) Galatasaray | Basketbol Süper Ligi | 36 | 30.6 | 55.4% | 55.9% | 86.5% | 2.0 | 3.1 | 2.2 | 0.2 | 14.3 |
| 2016–17 | (Turkey) Galatasaray | Basketbol Süper Ligi | 30 | 27.4 | 46.6% | 40.1% | 79.6% | 2.0 | 2.7 | 1.1 | 0.1 | 11.6 |
| 2017–18 | (Italy) Olimpia Milano | Serie A | 39 | 27.2 | 45.3% | 36.0% | 82.7% | 3.5 | 2.5 | 0.9 | 0.0 | 11.6 |
| 2018–19 | (Italy) Olimpia Milano | Serie A | 32 | 27.1 | 44.0% | 37.4% | 82.1% | 2.7 | 2.0 | 0.8 | 0.1 | 9.7 |
