= Marco Cusin =

Italian basketball player (born 1985)

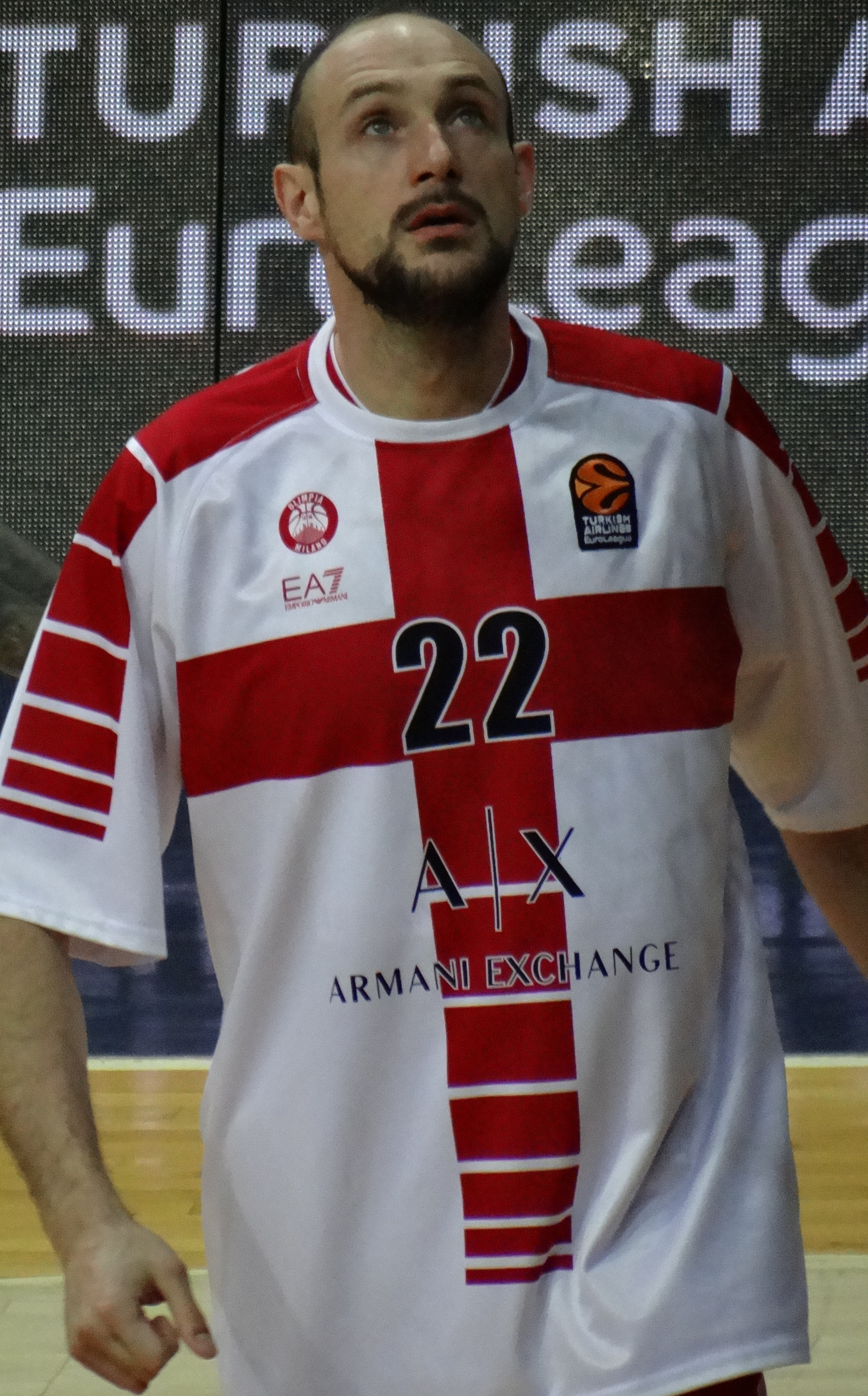
- Cusin with the Olimpia Milano in 2018

Free Agent
- Position: Center

Personal information
- Born: 28 February 1985 (age 40) Pordenone, Italy
- Listed height: 2.11 m (6 ft 11 in)
- Listed weight: 107 kg (236 lb)

Career information
- NBA draft: 2007: undrafted
- Playing career: 2002–present

Career history
- 2002–2004: Pallacanestro Trieste
- 2004–2006: Pallacanestro Biella
- 2006–2007: →B.C. Ferrara
- 2007: Fabriano Basket
- 2007–2010: Triboldi Soresina
- 2010–2012: V. L. Pesaro
- 2012–2014: Pallacanestro Cantù
- 2014: Dinamo Sassari
- 2014–2016: Vanoli Cremona
- 2016–2017: Sidigas Avellino
- 2017–2018: Olimpia Milano
- 2018–2019: Auxilium Torino
- 2019–2020: JuveCaserta
- 2020–2021: Fortitudo Bologna
- 2021–2025: Pallacanestro Cantù

Career highlights
- LBA champion (2018); 3× Italian Supercup winner (2012, 2014, 2017)

Marco Cusin (born 28 February 1985) is an Italian professional basketball player who last played for Pallacanestro Cantù of the Italian Serie A2 second tier national league.

== Professional career ==
On 14 July 2010 Cusin signed a deal with the Italian club VL Pesaro.

On 4 July 2012 Marco Cusin signed a deal with Pallacanestro Cantù.

In September 2014, Cusin went to Banco di Sardegna Sassari, but after just 35 days, on 28 October, he came back to Vanoli Cremona where he has played in the past.

On 29 June 2016 Cusin signed with Sidigas Avellino.

On 28 July 2017 Cusin signed a deal with Olimpia Milano for both LBA and EuroLeague, where he played for the first time in his career.

On 2 July 2018 Cusin left Milano and signed with Auxilium Torino.

On 25 August 2019 he signed with JuveCaserta of the Italian Serie A2 Basket.

On 30 October 2020 he joined Fortitudo Bologna, coached by Romeo Sacchetti, in the Italian Lega Basket Serie A and the FIBA Basketball Champions League (BCL).

On 30 September 2021 he signed for Pallacanestro Cantù of the Italian Serie A2 second tier national league.

== National team career ==
He was called up to the squad that would take part in EuroBasket 2015 to start on 5 September.
