= Emanuele Molin =

Italian basketball coach (born 1960)

Umana Reyer Venezia
- Position: Assistant coach
- League: LBA; EuroCup

Personal information
- Born: 12 February 1960 (age 66) Mestre, Italy
- Coaching career: 1988–present

Career history

Coaching
- 1988–2000: Pallacanestro Treviso (assistant)
- 2000–2002: Virtus Bologna (assistant)
- 2003–2005: Pallacanestro Treviso (assistant)
- 2005–2009: PBC CSKA Moscow (assistant)
- 2009–2011: Real Madrid Baloncesto (assistant)
- 2011: Real Madrid Baloncesto
- 2011–2013: Pallacanestro Cantù (assistant)
- 2013–2015: JuveCaserta Basket (assistant)
- 2015: JuveCaserta Basket
- 2015–2017: BC UNICS Kazan (assistant)
- 2017–2021: Aquila Basket Trento (assistant)
- 2021–2023: Aquila Basket Trento
- 2023–present: Reyer Venezia (assistant)

Career highlights
- As assistant coach: 3× EuroLeague champion (2001, 2006, 2008); 4× Italian League champion (1992, 1997, 2001, 2006); 9× Italian Cup champion (1993–1995, 2000–2005); 4× Italian Supercup champion (1997, 2000, 2001, 2012); 4× Russian League champion (2006–2009); 2× Russian Cup champion (2006, 2007)

Emanuele "Lele" Molin (born 12 February 1960) is an Italian professional basketball coach, who is currently the assistant coach for Reyer Venezia of the Italian Lega Basket Serie A (LBA) and the EuroCup.

== Coaching career ==
In 2005, Molin signed with the Russian team, PBC CSKA Moscow. In 2011, Molin was assigned as the head coach of Real Madrid Baloncesto, after head coach Ettore Messina stepped down in the position.
