= Kaleb Tarczewski =

American basketball player (born 1993)

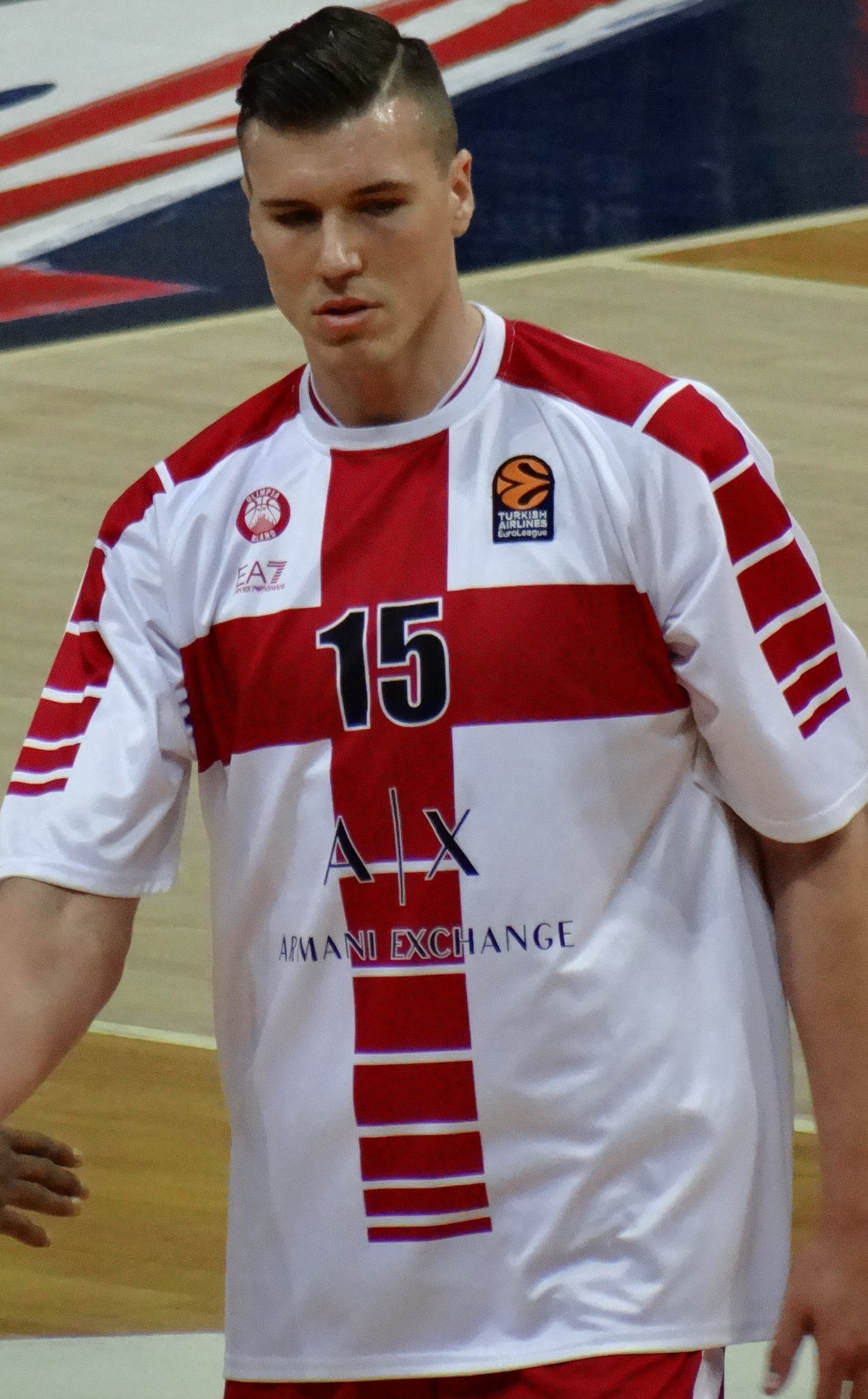
- Tarczewski with Olimpia Milano in 2018

No. 25 – Napoli Basket
- Position: Center
- League: LBA; EuroCup

Personal information
- Born: February 26, 1993 (age 33) Claremont, New Hampshire, U.S.
- Listed height: 7 ft 0 in (2.13 m)
- Listed weight: 245 lb (111 kg)

Career information
- High school: Stevens (Claremont, New Hampshire); St. Mark's (Southborough, Massachusetts)
- College: Arizona (2012–2016)
- NBA draft: 2016: undrafted
- Playing career: 2016–present

Career history
- 2016–2017: Oklahoma City Blue
- 2017–2022: Olimpia Milano
- 2022–2025: Gunma Crane Thunders
- 2025–2026: Yokohama B-Corsairs
- 2026–present: Napoli Basket

Career highlights
- 2x Lega Basket Serie A champion (2018, 2022); 2× Italian Cup winner (2021, 2022); 3× Italian Super Cup winner (2017, 2018, 2020); Second-team All-Pac-12 (2016); First-team Parade All-American (2012)
- Stats at Basketball Reference
Medals
Representing the United States
Pan American Games
Bronze medal – third place	2015 Toronto	National team

Kaleb Tarczewski (born February 26, 1993) is an American professional basketball player for Napoli Basket of the Italian Lega Basket Serie A (LBA) and the EuroCup. He played college basketball for the Arizona Wildcats. He is a 7-foot-tall (210 cm) center.

== High school career ==
Tarczewski attended Stevens High School in Claremont, New Hampshire for two years, leading Stevens High School's varsity basketball team to the NHIAA Final Four in 2008–2009. Tarczewski transferred to St. Mark's School in Southborough, Massachusetts after that season. Ranked as the No. 4 overall prospect in the country and the No. 3 center with a scout grade of 97 by ESPN in the class of 2012, Tarczewski led St. Mark's to a 28–2 record as a senior for coach Dave Lubick. He was named MVP of the Independent School League. Tarczewski averaged 17.0 points and 12 rebounds per game as a junior, and averaged 20.7 points, 10.2 rebounds and 2.7 blocks per game while shooting 63 percent from the floor as a senior. He tallied 14 points (6-of-8 FGs) and 10 rebounds in the Jordan Brand Classic, April 14 in Charlotte, North Carolina. He saw eight minutes of action in the 2012 Nike Hoop Summit, April 7 in Portland, Oregon. Among his other honors, Tarczewski helped the Lions to four consecutive NEPSAC championship games, including a victory in the 2012 Class AA title game, and was a first-team all-NEPSAC Class AA selection as a junior and senior. He participated in the Adidas Nations top-50 camp, the Adidas Super 64, the Double Pump Best of the Summer event and the Peach Jam tournament prior to his senior season.

College recruiting
Name	Hometown	School	Height	Weight	Commit date
Kaleb Tarczewski; C	Claremont, NH	St. Mark's School	7 ft 0 in (2.13 m)	230 lb (100 kg)	Aug 22, 2011
Kaleb Tarczewski; C	Recruit ratings: Scout: Rivals: 247Sports: ESPN:				
Overall recruit ranking: Scout: #6 Rivals: #9 ESPN: #4
Note: In many cases, Scout, Rivals, 247Sports, On3, and ESPN may conflict in their listings of height and weight.; In these cases, the average was taken. ESPN grades are on a 100-point scale.; Sources: "2012 Arizona Basketball Commits". Scout.; "ESPN". ESPN.; "Scout.com Team Recruiting Rankings". Scout.; "2012 Team Ranking". Rivals.

== College career ==
Tarczewski played four seasons with Arizona, helping the Wildcats to reach 110 victories, tying the school record. In his senior season, he averaged 9.4 points, 9.3 rebounds and 1.4 blocks and was named to the Pac-12 All-Conference Second Team and the Pac-12 All-Defensive Team.

=== College statistics ===
Year	Team	GP	GS	MPG	FG%	3P%	FT%	RPG	APG	SPG	BPG	PPG
2012–13	Arizona	35	35	22.0	.538	.000	.633	6.1	0.4	0.3	0.7	6.6
2013–14	Arizona	36	35	28.3	.584	.000	.756	6.3	0.5	0.1	1.0	9.9
2014–15	Arizona	38	37	26.0	.572	.000	.699	5.2	0.3	0.3	0.6	9.3
2015–16	Arizona	26	24	27.4	.533	.000	.712	9.3	0.6	0.3	1.4	9.4
Career		135	131	25.8	.561	.000	.704	6.5	0.5	0.3	0.9	8.8

== Professional career ==
After going undrafted in the 2016 NBA draft, Tarczewski joined the Detroit Pistons for the Orlando Summer League and the Washington Wizards for the Las Vegas Summer League. He signed with the Oklahoma City Thunder on September 23, 2016, but was later waived on October 24 after appearing in two preseason games. On November 3, he was acquired by the Oklahoma City Blue.

On March 14, 2017, Tarczewski signed with Olimpia Milano for the remainder of the season. He posted 6.7 points and 5.1 rebounds per game. On June 30, 2018, he inked a two-year contract extension. During the 2019–20 season, he averaged 8.1 points and 5.8 rebounds per game. Tarczewski signed a three-year contract extension in May 2020. On July 2, 2022, Tarczewski officially parted ways with the Italian club after five years, having won seven domestic titles and reached the EuroLeague Final Four once (2021) during his stint.

On July 12, 2022, Tarczewski signed with Gunma Crane Thunders of the Japanese B.League. On June 19, 2023, he re-signed with Gunma Crane Thunders. On June 13, 2024, he re-signed with Gunma Crane Thunders.

On September 15, 2026, Tarczewski signed a one-year deal with Napoli Basket of the Italian Lega Basket Serie A (LBA).

== National team career ==
Tarczewski represented the United States national team at the 2015 Pan American Games, where he won a bronze medal.

== Career statistics ==
Legend
GP	Games played	GS	Games started	MPG	Minutes per game
FG%	Field-goal percentage	3P%	3-point field-goal percentage	FT%	Free-throw percentage
RPG	Rebounds per game	APG	Assists per game	SPG	Steals per game
BPG	Blocks per game	PPG	Points per game	PIR	Performance index rating
**Bold**	Career high

=== EuroLeague ===
*	Led the league

Year	Team	GP	GS	MPG	FG%	3P%	FT%	RPG	APG	SPG	BPG	PPG	PIR
2017–18	Milano	30	**29**	19.7	.644	—	**.737**	5.7	.3	.3	.8	6.7	10.1
2018–19	Milano	24	24	18.2	**.724**	—	.692	4.6	**.4**	**.4**	.7	6.4	8.8
2019–20	Milano	28*	23	**21.3**	.654	—	.671	**5.8**	**.4**	**.4**	**.9**	**8.1**	**10.9**
2020–21	Milano	**39**	24	13.4	.579	—	.660	2.9	.3	.3	.4	4.0	4.6
2021–22	Milano	35	13	9.0	.472	—	.576	1.9	**.4**	.2	.2	2.0	1.8
Career		156	113	15.8	.628	—	.683	4.0	.4	.3	.6	5.2	6.8

=== Domestic leagues ===
Year	Team	League	GP	MPG	FG%	3P%	FT%	RPG	APG	SPG	BPG	PPG
2016–17	(United States) Oklahoma City Blue	NBA D-League	41	25.5	63.3%	–	72.7%	7.3	0.5	0.3	0.7	10.1
2016–17	(Italy) EA7 Emporio Armani Milano	Serie A	17	14.7	58.3%	–	66.7%	5.1	0.5	0.3	0.5	6.7
2017–18	(Italy) EA7 Emporio Armani Milano	Serie A	30	18.4	68.3%	–	80.7%	6.5	0.3	0.4	0.7	7.7
2018–19	(Italy) AX Armani Exchange Milano	Serie A	27	22.5	78.3%	–	61.0%	7.1	0.7	0.3	0.7	10.7
