= PalaGalassi =

Coordinates: 45.4128°N 10.4078°E

Unieuro Arena
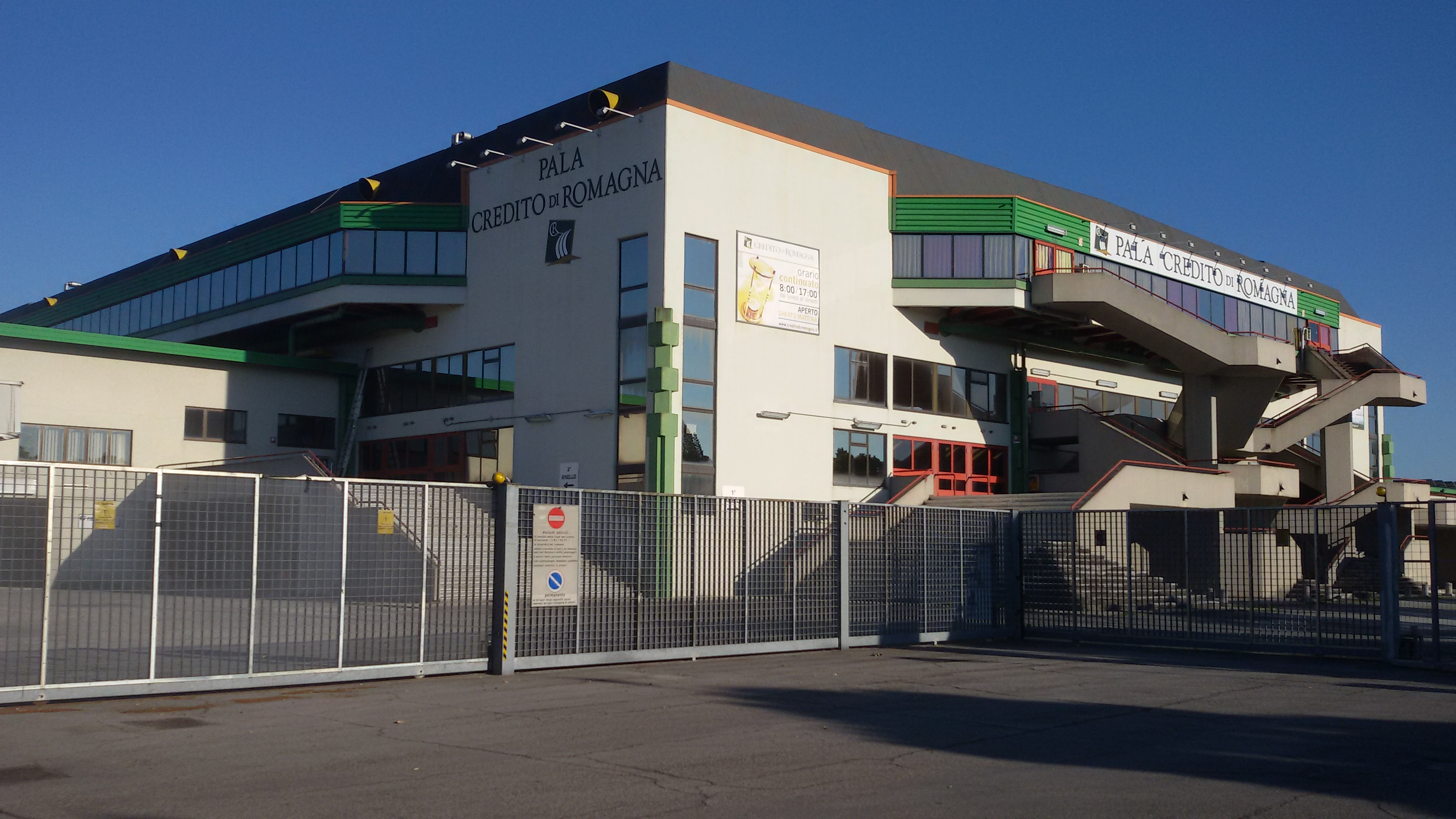
- Interactive map of Unieuro Arena
- Full name: PalaGalassi
- Former names: PalaFiera; PalaCredito di Romagna
- Location: Forlì, Italy
- Capacity: Basketball, Volleyball: 5,675
- Surface: Parquet

Construction
- Opened: 29 March 1987

Tenants
- Pallacanestro Forlì 2.015; Volley Forlì

PalaGalassi, also called Unieuro Arena for sponsorship reasons, is an indoor arena located in Forlì, Italy. The capacity of the arena is 5,675 people for basketball matches. It is home of the Pallacanestro Forlì 2.015 of the Serie A2 Basket and the volleyball team Volley Forlì.

== History ==
It was opened on March 29, 1987, for the basketball match between Libertas Forlì and Viola Reggio Calabria.

Here was played the finals of basketball Coppa Italia of LBA in 1990, 1992, 1993 and all the events between 2001 and 2006. In 2009 it hosted the volleyball Final Four of Coppa Italia. While in 2015 the Final Four of Serie B Basket between Fortitudo Bologna and Mens Sana Siena.

It was also the home court of the Fulgor Libertas Forlì until they ceased operating in January 2015 due to financial problems.

PalaGalassi is one of the top 10 largest indoor arenas in Italy, with 7,500 people and 5,676 seats. On June 16, 2010, during the Finals between Fulgor Libertas Forlì and Fortitudo Bologna there were more than 6,000 people.

In September 2017 it will host the 2017 Prozis Supercoppa of LBA.

== See also ==
- List of indoor arenas in Italy
