= Fulgor Libertas Forlì =

- Founded: 1949
- Dissolved: 2015
- Arena: Palafiera
- Location: Forlì, Italy
- Team colors: White and Red
- President: (Italy) Giorgio Grazioso
- Head coach: (Italy) Sandro Dell'Agnello
- Website: FulgorLibertasBasketForli.it (in Italian)
Home	Away

Fulgor Libertas Forlì was an Italian professional basketball team based in Forlì, Emilia-Romagna, Italy. The club ceased operating in January 2015 due to financial problems.

== History ==
Fulgor Forlì was founded in 1949 by Stefano Cozzi. It reached the national Serie C by the 1954-55 season, returning to the Promozione in 1957. A promotion to the Serie D in 1969-70 was followed by others to the Serie C2 (1979–80), Serie C1 (1982–83), Serie B2 (1985–86). Returning to the Serie C1, they stayed there until 1992-93 where they moved back to Serie B2, reaching the Serie B1 in June 2000.

Named Fulgor Libertas Forlì in 2003, in reference to Libertas Forlì who had represented the city in the first division Serie A until disappearing in 1999, the side stayed ten years in the third division. They obtained a promotion to the second division LegaDue in 2010 after Fortitudo Bologna - who had beaten them in the promotion playoffs - were barred from the league for financial reasons.

During the 2014–15 Serie A2 Gold (the new second division) season, the club struggled financially and player salaries were not paid. The professional players refused to play after some time with the under-19 team replacing them, furthermore the municipality barred the side from playing at the Palafiera arena. Fulgor Libertas Forlì withdrew from the league in mid-season in January 2015 and ceased operations soon afterwards.

== Notable players ==
- (Israel) Yuval Naimi
- (Sudan) Manute Bol
