= Simone Pianigiani =

Italian basketball coach

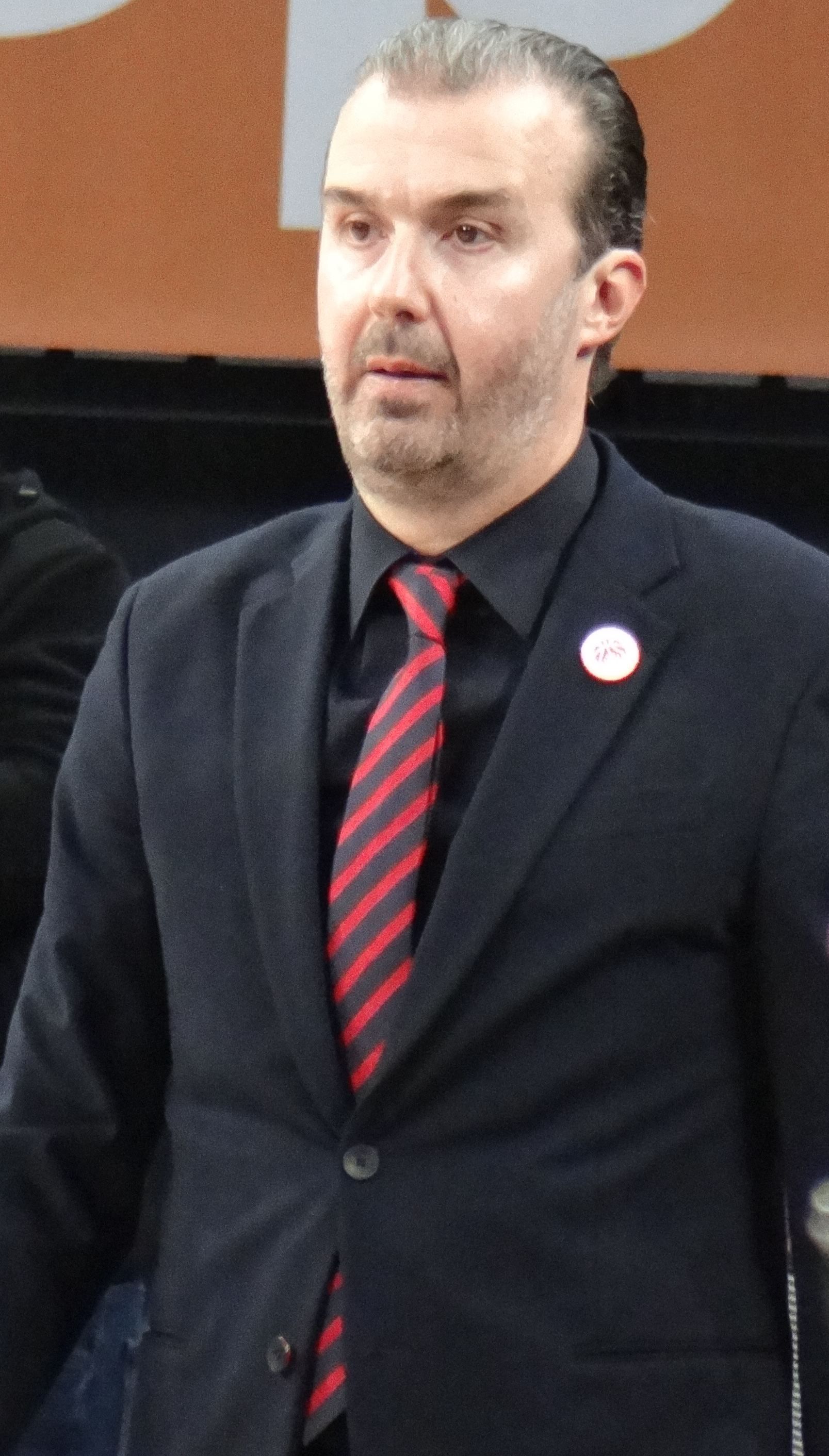

Free agent
- Position: Head coach

Personal information
- Born: 31 May 1969 (age 57) Siena, Italy
- Coaching career: 1995–present

Career history

Coaching
- 1995–2006: Montepaschi Siena (assistant)
- 1995–2006: Montepaschi Siena (youth teams)
- 2006–2012: Montepaschi Siena
- 2009–2015: Italy
- 2012–2013: Fenerbahçe Ülker
- 2016–2017: Hapoel Jerusalem
- 2017–2019: Olimpia Milano
- 2020: Beijing Ducks
- 2023–2024: Cedevita Olimpija

Career highlights
- Italian League Best Coach (2007); 6× Italian League champion (2007–2011, 2018); 6× Italian SuperCup winner (2007–2011, 2017-2018); 4× Italian Cup winner (2009–2011); Turkish Cup winner (2013); Israeli League Cup winner (2016); Israeli League champion (2017); Israeli League Coach of the Year (2017)

Simone Pianigiani (born 31 May 1969) is an Italian professional basketball coach.

== Coaching career ==
=== Pro clubs ===
Pianigiani was appointed the head coach of the Italian League club Montepaschi Siena before the 2006–07 season, and led his team to the Italian League championship in all six of his seasons on the bench. He was named the Italian League's Best Coach in 2007.

The 2008–09 Italian League season was especially notable, as Montepaschi won the Italian SuperCup before the season, the Italian Cup at mid-season, and won the Italian League championship, by sweeping all three of their playoff series. In 44 Italian domestic games that season, they lost only once – at Fortitudo Bologna, in an Italian League game. As head coach in Siena, he reached the Euroleague Final Four twice (2008 and 2011).

In the summer of 2012, he signed a two-year contract with Fenerbahçe Ülker. He resigned from his position as manager of Fenerbahçe Ülker in February 2013, citing personal issues. At the time of his resignation, the team was in the top spot of the Turkish Basketball League; however, they were only in 7th place out of 8 teams in the top 16 stage of the EuroLeague.

In June 2016, he signed a two-year contract with Hapoel Jerusalem. He led Hapoel to win the Israeli national championship and to reach the Eurocup semifinal.

After one season, he parted ways with Hapoel, and signed a three-year contract with Olimpia Milano.

On 13 September 2020 Beijing Ducks announced Pianigiani as their new head coach, replacing Yannis Christopoulos. but already at the end of the year moved he from head coach position to consultant role.

On June 13 2023 Cedevita Olimpija announced that Pianigiani signed a three-year contract with the Ljubljana side. Due to Pianigiani's health problems, the club and the head coach agreed to end their cooperation on January 1 2024 after a disappointing Eurocup season.

=== Italian national team ===
Pianigiani became the head coach of the senior men's Italian national basketball team in 2009, which he coached until 2015. He coached Italy at the EuroBasket 2011, the EuroBasket 2013, and the EuroBasket 2015.

== Coaching record ==
Legend
G	Games coached	W	Games won	L	Games lost	W–L %	Win-loss %

Note: The EuroLeague is not the only competition in which the team played during the season. He also coached in domestic competition, and regional competition if applicable.

=== EuroLeague ===
Team	Year	G	W	L	W–L%	Result
Montepaschi	2007–08	24	17	7	.708	Won in 3rd place game
Montepaschi	2008–09	20	13	7	.650	Eliminated in quarterfinals
Montepaschi	2009–10	16	11	5	.688	Eliminated in Top 16 stage
Montepaschi	2010–11	22	16	6	.727	Won in 3rd place game
Montepaschi	2011–12	20	13	7	.650	Eliminated in quarterfinals
Fenerbahçe	2012–13	18	7	11	.389	Eliminated in Top 16 stage
Milano	2017–18	30	10	20	.333	Eliminated in regular season
Milano	2018–19	30	14	16	.467	Eliminated in regular season
Career		180	101	79	.561	

== Honors and titles ==
Head coach

- Italian League Champion: 6

Mens Sana Siena: 2007, 2008, 2009, 2010, 2011
Olimpia Milano: 2018

- Italian SuperCup Winner: 7

Mens Sana Siena: 2007, 2008, 2009, 2010, 2011
Olimpia Milano: 2017, 2018

- Italian Cup Winner: 3

Mens Sana Siena: 2009, 2010, 2011

- EuroLeague Final Four Participation: 2

Mens Sana Siena: 2008, 2011

- Turkish Cup Winner:

Fenerbahçe Ülker: 2013

- Israeli Premier League Champion:

Hapoel Jerusalem: 2017

- Israeli League Cup Winner:

Hapoel Jerusalem: 2016

Assistant coach

- Saporta Cup Champion:

Mens Sana Siena: 2002

- Italian League Champion:

Mens Sana Siena: 2004

- Italian SuperCup Winner:

Mens Sana Siena: 2004–05

- EuroLeague Final Four Participation: 2

Mens Sana Siena: 2003, 2004

Youth coach

- Italian Youth Tournaments:

Cadets: 2

Mens Sana Siena: 2002, 2003

Juniors: 2

Mens Sana Siena: 2004, 2005

Under 20:

Mens Sana Siena: 2006
