= Luca Lechthaler =

Italian basketball player (born 1986)

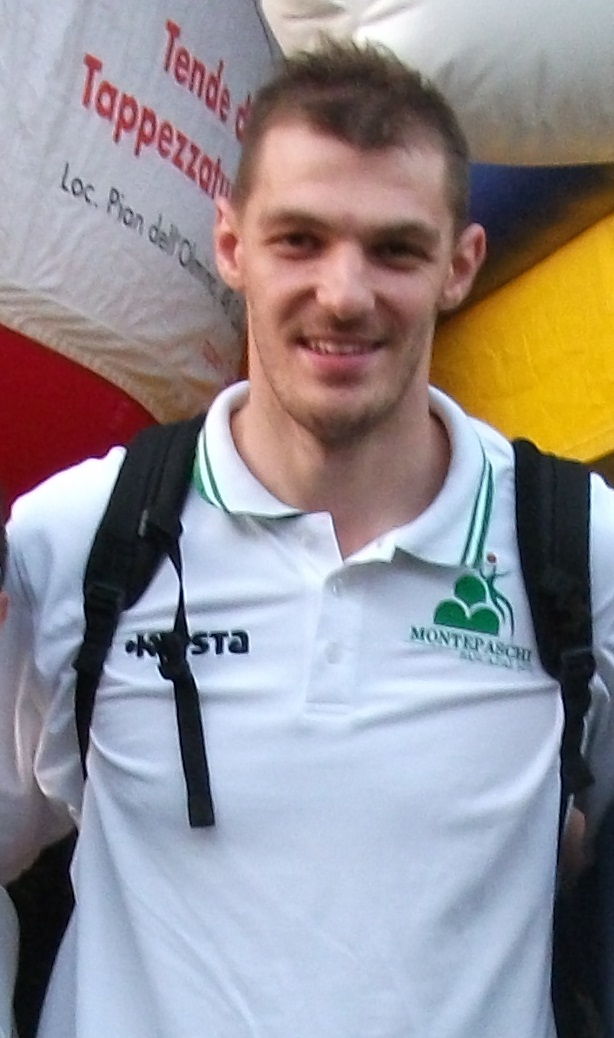
- Lechthaler celebrating a title with Siena in 2013

Aquila Basket Trento
- Title: Youth Academy Manager
- League: Lega Basket Serie A EuroCup

Personal information
- Born: January 23, 1986 (age 40) Mezzocorona, Italy
- Listed height: 2.07 m (6 ft 9 in)
- Listed weight: 115 kg (254 lb)

Career information
- NBA draft: 2008: undrafted
- Playing career: 2003–2021
- Position: Center

Career history
- 2003–2013: Montepaschi Siena
- 2004–2005: →Dinamo Banco di Sardegna Sassari
- 2005–2006: →Carife Ferrara
- 2007–2008: →Premiata Montegranaro
- 2009–2010: →Sigma Coatings Montegranaro
- 2010–2011: →Naturhouse Ferrara
- 2011: →Umana Reyer Venezia
- 2013–14: Dolomiti Energia Trento
- 2014–2015: Sidigas Avellino
- 2015–2021: Dolomiti Energia Trento

Career highlights
- 5× Serie A champion (2004, 2007, 2009, 2012, 2013); 3× Italian Cup winner (2009, 2012, 2013); 2× Italian Supercup winner (2008, 2011)

Luca Lechthaler (born 23 January 1986) is a retired Italian professional basketball player who now covers the role of Academy manager at Dolomiti Energia Trento of the Italian Lega Basket Serie A where he last played and concluded his career. He played as a center.

== Professional career ==
Lechthaler moved from his native Trentino (where he had mostly played handball) to U.S. Piani in neighbouring Bolzano aged 15. He stayed there one year before joining the youth ranks of Montepaschi Siena in 2002. The youngster won two under-16 national championships (2002 and 2003) with Siena, adding one under-18 and under-20 title apiece (2004).

At the same time he started to be welcomed into the first team, playing 2 minutes - for 1 rebound, 1 missed shot and 1 foul - in the 13 February 2003 Euroleague 112-49 blowout of KK Budućnost. He made his domestic Serie A debut in the 2 November 2003 game against Metis Varese, posting 1 steal and 1 foul in 2 minutes on the occasion. He barely featured in 2003-04, averaging 1.7 minutes in 6 games, though he became a Serie A (first division) champion when Montepaschi won the title at the end of the season.

For 2004-05, Lechthaler moved on loan to Dinamo Banco di Sardegna Sassari of the second division. The next season, he was again loaned to another second division club, Carife Ferrara. In 2005-06, he posted 3,8 points and 2.8 rebounds in 13.7 minutes per game during the regular season, upping his averages to 6.4 points and 4.7 rebounds in 18.3 minutes in the playoffs.

Returning to Siena under former youth coach (now head coach) Simone Pianigiani, Lechtaler was again Serie A champion in 2007 but was one of a number of Italians who barely featured for the side (averaging less than 3 minutes per game).

Therefore, he again went on loan, though this time he stayed in the Serie A, joining Premiata Montegranaro for the season, with an option for another. He more than quadrupled his average playing time with Montegranaro, to around 13 minutes in which he had 4.2 points, 3.5 rebounds and 0.9 steals (for as much turnovers). Despite his declared ambition to stay with the side another season, Lechthaler returned to Siena in 2008. A similar situation repeated itself for Lechthaler, stalling at less than 6 minutes per game (for 1.9 points and 1.3 rebounds) in the league, and less than 5 in the Euroleague (for 0.9 points and as much rebounds). He was able to add three titles to his record, as Siena swept the League, Cup and Supercup.

Again loaned to Montegranaro (now Sigma Coatings Montegranaro) for 2009-10, he was less potent, ending the season with 2,4 points and 2.8 rebounds in nearly 10 minutes per game. Though he again expressed a desire to stay, the club decided not to take the option on his contract for another year, with the coach reportedly finding him not dynamic enough.

Lechthaler was then loaned anew to Ferrara (known as Naturhouse Ferrara, still in the second division) for the 2010-11 season, starting it in good form before a muscular problem hampered him in November 2010. Another muscular problem in December sidelined him, he would not play for Ferrara again as he was re-loaned whilst still injured to fellow second division side Umana Reyer Venezia in February 2011 to take part in the playoffs.

A return to Montepaschi for 2011-12 saw no increase in his playing time as part of a team that again swept all domestic titles. He averaged 1.1 points and 1.2 rebounds in about 5 minutes per game domestically, adding 2 points and 3.3 rebounds in about 9 minutes in the Euroleague. The next season was eerily similar, with 2 points and 1.5 rebounds in about 10 minutes in the Euroleague, and 1.9 points with 2.3 rebounds in more than 6 minutes in Serie A. Lechthaler played a few minutes in the victorious Italian cup final on 10 February 2012 despite the death of his father earlier that week, he played no part whatsoever in the playoffs as Siena romped to another title.

In August 2013, the Trentino native - now a free-agent - joined Dolomiti Energia Trento of the second division. He averaged 3.5 points and 4.3 rebounds across 41 games to help Trento earn a promotion to the Serie A. Lechthaler would return to the Serie A with another team, Sidigas Avellino, in August 2014. After posting a meager 1.1 points and 1.8 rebounds in 25 games during the 2014-15 season, he would reunite with Trento in August 2015, signing a one-year deal with the side about to make its EuroCup debut.

At the end of the 2020–21 LBA season he decided to retire from professional basketball and took the role as academy manager for Aquila Basket Trento

== International career ==
Lechthaler started playing for the Italy Under-18 national team in 2004, participating in the FIBA Europe Under-18 Championship that year, he posted 3.4 points, 3.9 rebounds and 0.8 blocks in 16.5 minutes per game.

Moving up to the Under-20 squad, he participated in the 2005 European Championships, posting 13.8 points, 7.8 rebounds and 0.9 blocks in more than 26 minutes. At the 2006 FIBA Europe Under-20 Championship, he had 8.3 points and 4.4 rebounds for 3.1 turnovers in over 20 minutes per game.

Lechthaler made his debut for the senior Italian national team in May 2008, playing for the side throughout that same summer. In March 2009, he was in the Italy training camp to prepare for FIBA EuroBasket 2009 qualification but he did not play in the games five months later.

Called up to the preliminary squad for FIBA EuroBasket 2011 qualification, he played in the July 2010 Memorial Diego Gianatti tournament but was not part of the squad the month after and has not played again for Italy as of August 2015.
