= Andrés Pablo Forray =

Argentine-Italian basketball player

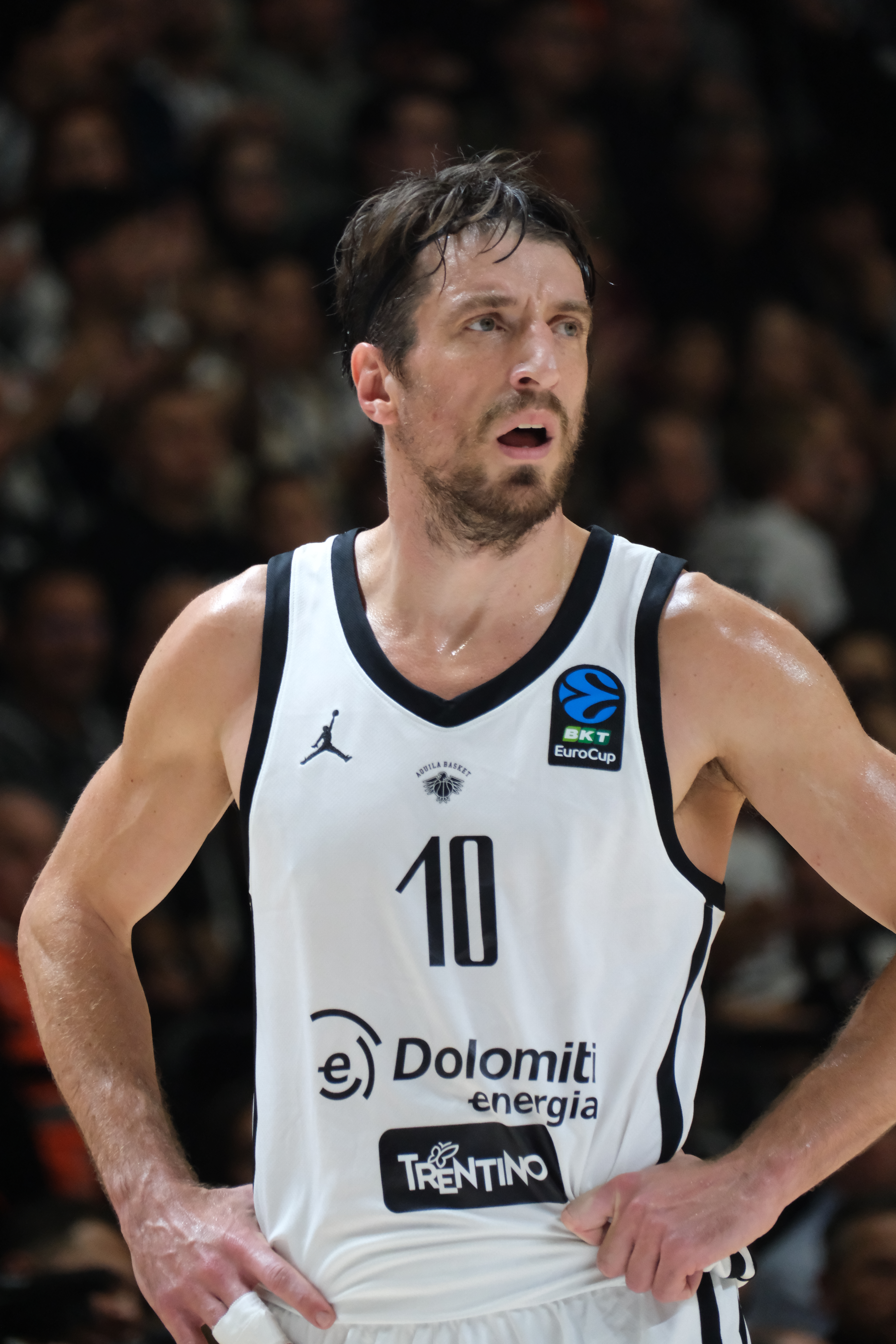
- Forray with Aquila Trento in 2025

No. 10 – Aquila Basket Trento
- Position: Point guard
- League: LBA

Personal information
- Born: March 20, 1986 (age 40) Buenos Aires, Argentina
- Listed height: 1.87 m (6 ft 2 in)
- Listed weight: 83 kg (183 lb)

Career information
- Playing career: 2003–present

Career history
- 2003–2004: Messina
- 2004–2005: Virtus Basket Padova
- 2005–2008: Jesolo Sandonà Basket
- 2008–2011: Fulgor Libertas Forlì
- 2011–present: Aquila Trento

Career highlights
- Italian Cup winner (2025); 2× Serie A2 Basket winner (2012, 2014); Italian LNP Cup winner (2013)

Andrés Pablo Forray (born March 20, 1986), also called Toto Forray, is an Argentine-born naturalized Italian professional basketball player for Aquila Basket Trento of the Lega Basket Serie A (LBA). He is a 1.87 m (6 ft 1 1/2 in) point guard.

== Professional career ==
Andrés Forray is in Italy since 2003, but he grew up with Club Banco Provincia di Buenos Aires youth team.

His first team in Italy was Pallacanestro Messina in the 2003-04 season in the first and highest-tier level of the Italian league pyramid. He had the opportunity to play with players like Matt Bonner.

Forray later played with Virtus Padova (one season) and JesoloSandonà Basket (two seasons) in Serie B until 2008, when Fulgor Libertas Forlì club offered him a three years contract from 2008 to 2011.

In January 2011 he went to Aquila Basket Trento. With the Trento based club he achieved the promotion to Serie A2 in 2012, the championship of the Italian LNP Cup in 2013 and the promotion to the highest-tier level of the Italian basketball league system. Since the 2014–15 season he played in LBA. In August 2016 Toto Forray renews the contract with Trento for the next 3 years.

In 2016 Forray became the new Aquila Basket Trento captain as Davide Pascolo left the club June of the same year.

== Honours and titles ==
=== Team ===
- Serie A2 Basket winner (2): 2012, 2014
- Italian LNP Cup winner (1): 2013
