= Dominique Sutton =

American basketball player (born 1986)

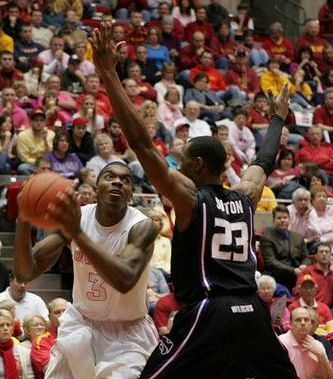
- Sutton (#23) defending at Kansas State

No. 3 – Manama Club
- Position: Small forward
- League: Bahraini Premier League & WASL

Personal information
- Born: October 20, 1986 (age 39) Durham, North Carolina, U.S.
- Listed height: 6 ft 5 in (1.96 m)
- Listed weight: 215 lb (98 kg)

Career information
- High school: Jordan (Durham, North Carolina); The Patterson School (Lenoir, North Carolina)
- College: Kansas State (2007–2010); North Carolina Central (2011–2012)
- NBA draft: 2012: undrafted
- Playing career: 2012–present

Career history
- 2012–2013: Tulsa 66ers
- 2013: Titanes del Licey
- 2013–2014: Ikaros Chalkidas
- 2014: Air21 Express
- 2014–2015: Santa Cruz Warriors
- 2015–2016: Aquila Trento
- 2016: GlobalPort Batang Pier
- 2016: ratiopharm Ulm
- 2016–2017: SLUC Nancy
- 2017–2018: Aquila Trento
- 2018–2019: Rytas Vilnius
- 2019: San Pablo Burgos
- 2019: Anhui Dragons
- 2019–2020: New Basket Brindisi
- 2020: Al Manama
- 2021: Reggio Emilia
- 2021: Al Manama
- 2021: Libertadores de Querétaro
- 2022: Phoenix Super LPG Fuel Masters
- 2022: Guaiqueríes de Margarita
- 2022–2023: Pelita Jaya
- 2023–2024: Mayrouba
- 2025–2026: Al Manama
- 2026: Raleigh Firebirds

Career highlights
- NBA D-League champion (2015); NBA D-League All-Defensive Third Team (2015); First-team All-MEAC (2012)

Dominique Leondras Sutton (born October 20, 1986) is an American basketball player for Al Manama of the Bahraini Premier League and the West Asia Super League (WASL). He played college basketball for the Kansas State Wildcats and North Carolina Central Eagles.

== High school career ==
As a freshman and sophomore, Sutton attended Jordan High School in Durham, North Carolina. As a sophomore in 2004–05, he averaged 19.7 points per game as he guided the Falcons to a 19–8 record and the 4-A Western Regional semi-finals. He subsequently earned Associated Press second-team all-state honors and was named the Durham Sun-Herald and PAC-6 4-A Player of the Year.

In 2005, Sutton transferred to The Patterson School in Lenoir, North Carolina where he played for coach Chris Chaney as a junior and senior. In November 2006, he signed a National Letter of Intent to play college basketball for Kansas State University.

As a senior in 2006–07, Sutton averaged 15.0 points, 7.5 rebounds and a team-leading 3.0 steals per game as he and teammate Jamar Samuels helped the Bulldogs to a 36–4 overall record and No. 3 national prep school ranking. Patterson advanced to the inaugural Prep School National Championship, where they lost in the semi-finals to eventual champion Notre Dame Prep led by Michael Beasley.

== College career ==
In his freshman season at Kansas State, Sutton saw action in 19 games with eight starting assignments. He did not join the squad until December 26, 2007, after completing necessary academic requirements, missing the first 11 games. He also missed three games in February due to a knee sprain. He averaged 3.3 points, 2.5 rebounds and 1.1 steals in 13.4 minutes per game.

In his sophomore season, Sutton saw action in 34 games with 32 starting assignments, as he was one of seven players to see time in all 34 games. He recorded 10 double-digit scoring games and one 20-point game with a then career-high 21 points against Wagner on December 30, 2008. He averaged 7.5 points, 5.4 rebounds, 1.0 assists and 1.1 steals in 22.9 minutes per game.

In his junior season, Sutton saw action in all 37 games with 36 starting assignments, as he was one of four players to see time in all 37 games. He averaged 7.2 points, 5.8 rebounds, 1.9 assists and 1.2 steals in 24.2 minutes per game.

In July 2010, Sutton transferred to North Carolina Central University and subsequently redshirted the 2010–11 season.

In his senior season at North Carolina Central, Sutton earned first-team All-MEAC and second-team NABC Division I All-District 15 honors. In 32 games (25 starts), he averaged 16.4 points, 7.4 rebounds, 1.7 assists and 2.2 steals in 33.9 minutes per game.

== Professional career ==
=== 2012–13 season ===
After going undrafted in the 2012 NBA draft, Sutton joined the Orlando Magic for the 2012 NBA Summer League where he averaged 3.2 points and 2.4 rebounds in five games. On October 5, 2012, he joined Élan Chalon of the LNB Pro A for a one-week tryout. He later parted ways with Chalon on October 14 after not passing the tryout. On November 2, 2012, he was selected by the Tulsa 66ers with the sixth overall pick in the 2012 NBA Development League Draft.

=== 2013–14 season ===
In July 2013, Sutton joined the Brooklyn Nets for Orlando Summer League and the NBA D-League Select Team for the Las Vegas Summer League. On August 23, 2013, he joined Titanes del Licey for their LNB Finals series against Indios de San Francisco de Macorís.

On September 23, 2013, Sutton signed with Ikaros Chalkidas of Greece for the 2013–14 season. In May 2014, he signed with Air21 Express as an import for the 2014 PBA Governors' Cup.

=== 2014–15 season ===
On December 4, 2014, Sutton was acquired by the Santa Cruz Warriors. On April 26, 2015, he won the D-League championship with the Warriors.

=== 2015–16 season ===
In July 2015, Sutton joined the Golden State Warriors for the 2015 NBA Summer League. Later that month, on the 24th, he signed a one-year deal with Dolomiti Energia Trento of the Italian Serie A. In 32 league games, he averaged 7.7 points, 4.7 rebounds, 1.3 assists and 1.2 steals per game.

On June 12, 2016, Sutton signed with GlobalPort Batang Pier for the 2016 PBA Governors' Cup. On July 23, he was released by GlobalPort per his request, after Sutton received an offer to workout with the Cleveland Cavaliers.

=== 2016–17 and 2017-2018 seasons ===
On September 5, 2016, Sutton signed a two-month deal with German club ratiopharm Ulm. On November 14, 2016, he signed with French club SLUC Nancy Basket for the rest of the 2016–17 Pro A season. On January 11, 2017, he left Nancy and returned to his former club Aquila Basket Trento for the rest of the 2016–17 Serie A season. In the 2017–2018 season, he was one of the best players for Trento, both in the Eurocup and the Serie A, and helped Trento reach the Serie A finals, where they lost to Olimpia Milano.

=== 2018–19 season ===
On August 8, 2018, Sutton signed a contract with Lithuanian club Rytas Vilnius.

After being suspended by Rytas, Sutton signed with Spanish club San Pablo Burgos for the rest of the season.

=== 2019–20 season ===
Sutton spent the 2019–20 season with New Basket Brindisi in the Lega Basket Serie A (LBA) and Basketball Champions League, averaging 14.7 points and 7.3 rebounds per game.

=== 2020–21 season ===
On July 28, 2020, Sutton signed with Al-Ahli of the Bahrain Basketball Association. At the turn of 2021, on January 8, Sutton makes his return to Italy signing with Reggio Emilia until the end of the 2020–21 season.

Unfortunately, after only four matches in the Serie A with the new team, he had a discussion with the coach during the game against Virtus Bologna where he refused to play after a substitution. He was excluded from the team and officially released on February 26.

In March 2021, Sutton returned to Bahrain signing again with his previous team Al-Ahli. In the summer of 2021, he played for Libertadores de Querétaro of the Mexican Liga Nacional de Baloncesto Profesional and averaged 6.8 points, 3.3 rebounds, and 1.3 steals per game.

=== 2021–22 season ===
In February 2022, Sutton returned to the Philippine Basketball Association, this time signing with the Phoenix Super LPG Fuel Masters. He replaced Paul Harris as the team's import during the 2021 PBA Governors' Cup. He was replaced on March 1 by Du'Vaughn Maxwell after playing four games for the team, averaging 16.3 points, 9.8 rebounds, and 2.0 steals.

=== 2022-23 season ===
Sutton joined Pelita Jaya and became one of the most dominant player in Indonesian Basketball League. Averaging 13.0 PPG and 10.7 RPG.

== The Basketball Tournament ==
Dominique Sutton played for Armored Athlete in the 2018 edition of The Basketball Tournament. In 1 game, he had 2 points, 1 assist, and 2 rebounds. Armored Athlete reached the Super 16 before falling to Boeheim's Army.

== Personal life ==
Sutton is the son of Quintin Sutton and Katrina Reid, and has a brother, Lavaedeau Lee. He and his partner have daughters.
