= Davide Pascolo =

Italian basketball player

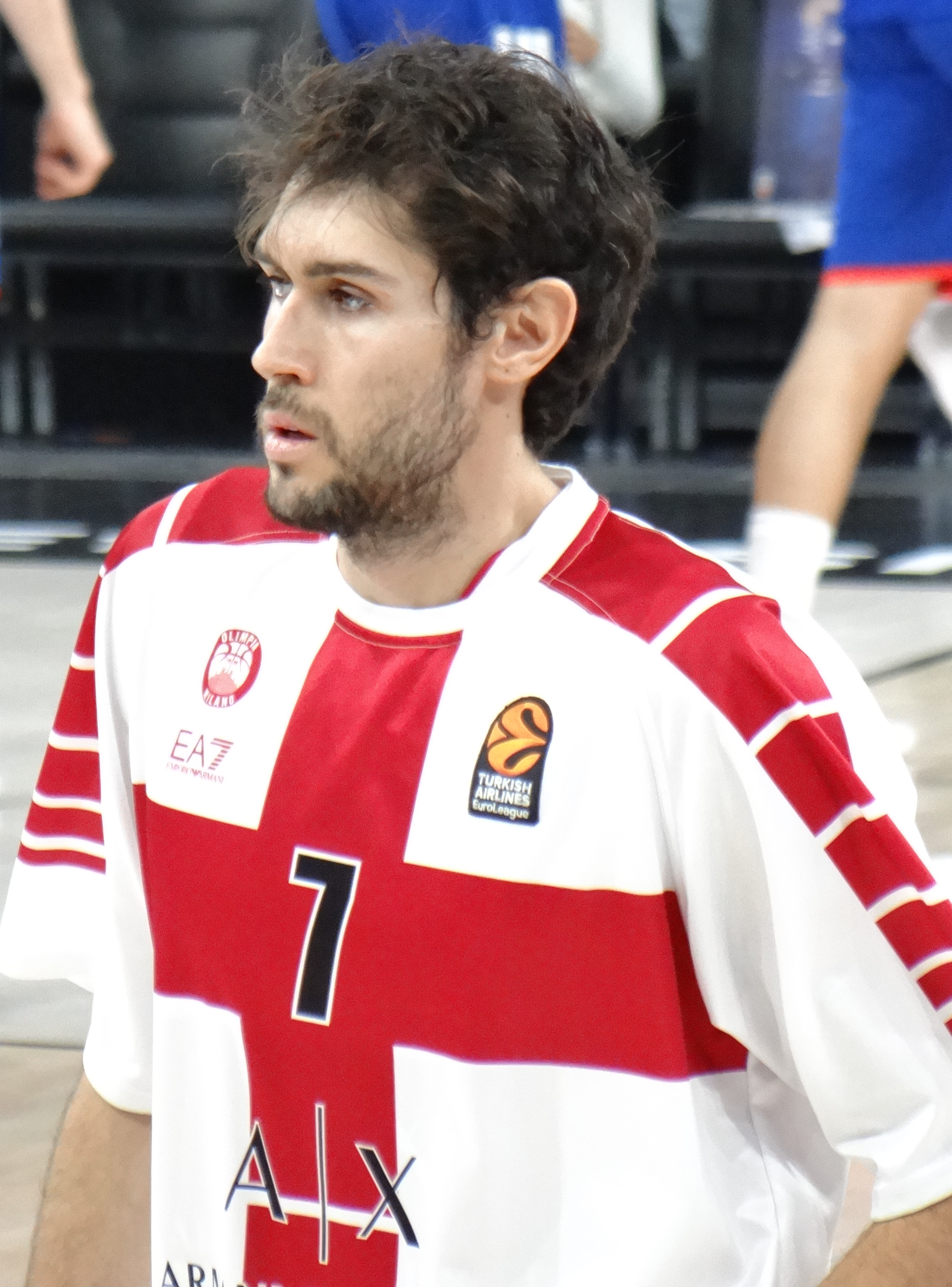
- Pascolo with Olimpia Milano in 2017

No. 14 – Pallacanestro Forlì 2.015
- Position: Power forward
- League: Serie A2

Personal information
- Born: 14 December 1990 (age 35) Udine, Italy
- Listed height: 2.02 m (6 ft 8 in)
- Listed weight: 88 kg (194 lb)

Career information
- NBA draft: 2012: undrafted
- Playing career: 2008–present

Career history
- 2008–2011: Snaidero Cucine Udine
- 2011–2016: Aquila Basket Trento
- 2016–2018: Olimpia Milano
- 2018–2021: Aquila Basket Trento
- 2021–2023: Assigeco Piacenza
- 2023-present: Pallacanestro Forlì 2.015

Career highlights
- LBA champion (2018); Italian Cup winner (2017); 2× Italian Super Cup winner (2016, 2017); All-EuroCup First Team (2016); 3× Italian League All-Star Game (2014–2016); Italian 2nd Division champion (2014); Italian 2nd Division MVP (2014); Italian 2nd Tier Cup MVP (2013); Italian 2nd Tier Cup Best Player Under 22 (2013); Italian 2nd Tier Cup winner (2013); Italian 3rd Division champion (2012)

Davide Pascolo (born 14 December 1990) is an Italian professional basketball player for Unieuro Forlì of the Italian Serie A2, second tier national league. At a height of 2.03 m (6 ft 8 in) tall, his primary position is power forward, but he can also be used as a small ball center, if needed.

== Professional career ==
Pascolo began his professional career with his home town team of Snaidero Cucine Udine, in the Italian First Division, in the 2008–09 season. Pascolo initially struggled to become a regular rotation player in the team. That continued even after the club was relegated to the Italian Second Division, where Pascolo played with the team for the 2009–10 and 2010–11 seasons.

Pascolo then left Udine, and he then joined Aquila Basket Trento, which was playing in the Italian 3rd Division, for the 2011–12 season. That proved to be a wise move for Pasdcolo, as the club moved up in the ranks of the Italian basketball league system. They achieved that by first gaining a promotion to the Italian 2nd Division, where they also won the Italian 2nd-tier national cup, in 2012–13; and by then gaining a promotion to the top-tier level Italian league, the LBA, after the 2013–14 season, in which Pascolo was named the league MVP of the Italian 2nd-tier level. He was named to the European 2nd-tier level EuroCup's All-EuroCup First Team, for the 2015–16 season.

On 17 June 2016 Pascolo signed a multi-year deal with the Italian club Olimpia Milano.

On 1 July 2018 Pascolo left Olimpia Milano after 2 seasons, where he won one Supercup, one Italian Cup and one Scudetto.

On 24 July 2018 Pascolo officially announced the return to Aquila Basket Trento with a three-year deal. On 17 June 2020 he extended his contract until 2023.

On 29 September 2021 he played for the 2021–2022 season with Assigeco Piacenza in the Serie A2 second tier national league, on a loan contract basis, before officially transferring to Piacenza until the end of the 2022-2023 season.

Before the 2023-2024 season, Pascolo moved to Serie A2 team Unieuro Forlì, ending the season in the first place of the regular season leaderboard, although losing in the semifinals to Serie A1 team Trieste Basket. He's currently playing in Forlì.

== International career ==
Pascolo was called up to the senior men's Italian national basketball team in 2014, and he played a marginal part in the team's EuroBasket 2015 qualification tournament, in which they qualified for the actual main tournament, the EuroBasket 2015.
