= 2017 LBA Playoffs =

The 2017 Serie A Playoffs are the final phase of the 2016–17 Serie A season. They started on 12 May and ended in June 2017 with the Finals. Playoffs' Quarter-finals will begin on May 12, the Semi-finals on May 25 and the Finals on June 10, 2017.

EA7 Emporio Armani Milano was the defending champion.

Umana Reyer Venezia won their 3rd title by beating Dolomiti Energia Trento in game 6 of the finals.

== Qualified teams ==
The eight first qualified teams after the end of the regular season qualified for the playoffs.

Pos	Team	Pld	W	L	PF	PA	PR	Pts	Qualification
1	EA7 Emporio Armani Milano	30	23	7	2584	2384	1.084	46	Seeded teams
2	Umana Reyer Venezia	30	21	9	2447	2330	1.050	42	Seeded teams
3	Sidigas Avellino	30	19	11	2392	2285	1.047	38	Seeded teams
4	Dolomiti Energia Trento	30	18	12	2352	2201	1.069	36	Seeded teams
5	Banco di Sardegna Sassari	30	17	13	2301	2218	1.037	34	Non-seeded teams
6	Grissin Bon Reggio Emilia	30	17	13	2458	2443	1.006	34	Non-seeded teams
7	The Flexx Pistoia	30	15	15	2306	2298	1.003	30	Non-seeded teams
8	Betaland Capo d'Orlando	30	15	15	2291	2315	0.990	30	Non-seeded teams

Source: Legabasket

== Bracket ==
As of 20 June 2017.

Quarter-finals
1	EA7 Emporio Armani Milano	3
8	Betaland Capo d'Orlando	1
4	Dolomiti Energia Trento	3
5	Banco di Sardegna Sassari	0
2	Umana Reyer Venezia	3
7	The Flexx Pistoia	1
3	Sidigas Avellino	3
6	Grissin Bon Reggio Emilia	0

Semifinals
1	EA7 Emporio Armani Milano	1
4	Dolomiti Energia Trento	4
2	Umana Reyer Venezia	4
3	Sidigas Avellino	2

Final
4	Dolomiti Energia Trento	2
2	Umana Reyer Venezia	4

== Quarterfinals ==
The quarterfinals will be played in a best of five format.

=== EA7 Emporio Armani Milano v Betaland Capo d'Orlando ===
12 May 2017	EA7 Emporio Armani Milano	80–87 (Series: 0–1)	Betaland Capo d'Orlando	Assago
20:45 (CEST)	Scoring by quarter: 10–18, 23–21, 18–25, 29–23
Rai Sport	Pts: Pascolo 24; Rebs: Simon 11; Asts: Kalnietis 5 PIR: Pascolo 25	Boxscore	Pts: Ianuzzo 18; Rebs: Ianuzzo 8 Asts: Ivanović, Tepić 7 PIR: Ianuzzo, Ivanović 23	Arena: Mediolanum Forum; Referees: Gianluca Mattioli, Emanuele Aronne, Denis Quarta

14 May 2017	EA7 Emporio Armani Milano	95–83 (Series: 1–1)	Betaland Capo d'Orlando	Assago
20:30 (CEST)	Scoring by quarter: 25–25, 24–18, 24–25, 22–15
Sky Sport	Pts: Hickman 17; Rebs: Tarczewski 8 Asts: Cinciarini 6 PIR: Hickman 20	Boxscore	Pts: Diener, Ivanović 13; Rebs: Tepić 7 Asts: Tepić 7 PIR: Tepić 23	Arena: Mediolanum Forum; Referees: Saverio Lanzarini, Alessandro Vicino, Luca Weidmann

16 May 2017	Betaland Capo d'Orlando	80–94 (Series: 1–2)	EA7 Emporio Armani Milano	Capo d'Orlando
20:30 (CEST)	Scoring by quarter: 19–20, 26–20, 19–29, 16–25
	Pts: Ivanović 16; Rebs: Bērziņš 7 Asts: Ivanović 5 PIR: Ivanović 19	Boxscore	Pts: Simon 18; Rebs: Raduljica, Simon 4 Asts: Cinciarini 5 PIR: Simon 23	Arena: PalaFantozzi; Referees: Massimiliano Filippini, Michele Rossi, Fabrizio Paglialunga

18 May 2017	Betaland Capo d'Orlando	62–77 (Series: 1–3)	EA7 Emporio Armani Milano	Capo d'Orlando
20:45 (CEST)	Scoring by quarter: 12–24, 19–21, 18–20, 13–12
Rai Sport	Pts: Archie 15; Rebs: Tepić 13; Asts: Ivanović 4 PIR: Tepić 16	Boxscore	Pts: Mačvan 15; Rebs: Mačvan 6 Asts: Cinciarini 6 PIR: Mačvan 21	Arena: PalaFantozzi; Referees: Dino Seghetti, Alessandro Martolini, Mark Bartoli

=== Dolomiti Energia Trento v Banco di Sardegna Sassari ===
12 May 2017	Dolomiti Energia Trento	65–55 (Series: 1–0)	Banco di Sardegna Sassari	Trento
20:45 (CEST)	Scoring by quarter: 15–16, 12–10, 25–8, 13–21
Sky Sport	Pts: Gomes 17; Rebs: Hogue 8 Asts: Craft 6 PIR: Hogue 24	Boxscore	Pts: Bell 10; Rebs: Lawal 11; Asts: Lighty 3 PIR: Lawal 16	Arena: PalaTrento; Referees: Tolga Sahin, Michele Rossi, Gabriele Bettini

14 May 2017	Dolomiti Energia Trento	74–68 (Series: 2–0)	Banco di Sardegna Sassari	Trento
20:45 (CEST)	Scoring by quarter: 12–14, 18–14, 24–28, 20–12
Rai Sport	Pts: Sutton 17; Rebs: Hogue 8 Asts: Craft, Shields 6 PIR: Sutton 15	Boxscore	Pts: Bell 17; Rebs: Lydeka 11; Asts: Bell 3 PIR: Bell 18	Arena: PalaTrento; Referees: Enrico Sabetta, Gianluca Sardella, Mark Bartoli

16 May 2017	Banco di Sardegna Sassari	69–75 (Series: 0–3)	Dolomiti Energia Trento	Sassari
20:45 (CEST)	Scoring by quarter: 21–21, 15–13, 19–22, 14–19
Sky Sport	Pts: Lacey 15; Rebs: Sacchetti 8 Asts: Savanović 4 PIR: Lawal 18	Boxscore	Pts: Gomes 16; Rebs: Gomes 10; Asts: Craft 6 PIR: Gomes 23	Arena: PalaSerradimigni; Referees: Roberto Begnis, Beniamino Manuel Attard, Denny Borgioni

=== Sidigas Avellino v Grissin Bon Reggio Emilia ===
13 May 2017	Sidigas Avellino	82–64 (Series: 1–0)	Grissin Bon Reggio Emilia	Avellino
20:30 (CEST)	Scoring by quarter: 17–10, 21–15, 19–21, 25–18
	Pts: Fesenko 24; Rebs: Fesenko 9 Asts: Ragland 10; PIR: Fesenko 31	Boxscore	Pts: Wright 15; Rebs: Aradori, Wright 5 Asts: Wright 4 PIR: Wright 18	Arena: PalaDelMauro; Referees: Roberto Begnis, Carmelo Lo Guzzo, Fabrizio Paglialunga

15 May 2017	Sidigas Avellino	75–67 (Series: 2–0)	Grissin Bon Reggio Emilia	Avellino
20:45 (CEST)	Scoring by quarter: 8–12, 22–27, 21–14, 24–14
Sky Sport	Pts: Logan 21; Rebs: Fesenko 10; Asts: Green 9 PIR: Fesenko 26	Boxscore	Pts: Aradori 18; Rebs: Wright 7 Asts: De Nicolao, Wright 4 PIR: Aradori 23	Arena: PalaDelMauro; Referees: Manuel Mazzoni, Maurizio Biggi, Luca Weidmann

17 May 2017	Grissin Bon Reggio Emilia	79–80 (Series: 0–3)	Sidigas Avellino	Reggio Emilia
20:30 (CEST)	Scoring by quarter: 19–23, 24–22, 20–21, 16–14
Sky Sport	Pts: Aradori 22; Rebs: Cervi, Wright 6 Asts: four players 3 PIR: Aradori 25	Boxscore	Pts: Ragland 21; Rebs: Logan 8 Asts: four players 3 PIR: Ragland 20	Arena: PalaBigi; Referees: Tolga Sahin, Gianluca Sardella, Emanuele Aronne

=== Umana Reyer Venezia v The Flexx Pistoia ===
13 May 2017	Umana Reyer Venezia	84–71 (Series: 1–0)	The Flexx Pistoia	Mestre
19:30 (CEST)	Scoring by quarter: 22–18, 17–12, 24–22, 21–19
Sky Sport	Pts: Haynes 23; Rebs: Stone 9 Asts: Filloy 4 PIR: Haynes 23	Boxscore	Pts: Petteway 17; Rebs: Lombardi, Crosariol 6 Asts: Moore 9 PIR: Crosariol 17	Arena: Taliercio; Referees: Massimiliano Filippini, Beniamino Manuel Attard, Denny Borgioni

15 May 2017	Umana Reyer Venezia	72–68 (Series: 2–0)	The Flexx Pistoia	Mestre
20:30 (CEST)	Scoring by quarter: 22–28, 14–4, 17–19, 19–17
	Pts: Perić 18; Rebs: Stone 8 Asts: Stone 4 PIR: Perić, Batista 14	Boxscore	Pts: Petteway 14; Rebs: Crosariol 11; Asts: Jenkins 5 PIR: Crosariol 16	Arena: Taliercio; Referees: Dino Seghetti, Alessandro Martolini, Dario Morelli

17 May 2017	The Flexx Pistoia	89–75 (Series: 1–2)	Umana Reyer Venezia	Pistoia
20:30 (CEST)	Scoring by quarter: 22–24, 19–10, 19–19, 29–22
Rai Sport	Pts: Petteway 26; Rebs: Boothe 7 Asts: Moore 11; PIR: Petteway 29	Boxscore	Pts: Perić 15; Rebs: Perić 5 Asts: Tonut 5 PIR: Perić 14	Arena: PalaCarrara; Referees: Enrico Sabetta, Gabriele Bettini, Denis Quarta

19 May 2017	The Flexx Pistoia	79–92 (Series: 1–3)	Umana Reyer Venezia	Pistoia
20:30 (CEST)	Scoring by quarter: 23–28, 24–23, 19–25, 13–16
Sky Sport	Pts: Petteway 21; Rebs: Crosariol 5 Asts: Moore 8 PIR: Crosariol 21	Boxscore	Pts: Haynes 31; Rebs: Perić 7 Asts: Haynes 5 PIR: Haynes 33	Arena: PalaCarrara; Referees: Saverio Lanzarini, Carmelo Lo Guzzo, Luca Weidmann

== Semifinals ==
The semifinals are played in a best of seven format.

=== EA7 Emporio Armani Milano v Dolomiti Energia Trento ===
25 May 2017	EA7 Emporio Armani Milano	66–76 (Series: 0–1)	Dolomiti Energia Trento	Assago
20:45 (CEST)	Scoring by quarter: 17–10, 24–28, 13–20, 12–18
Rai Sport; Sky Sport	Pts: Tarczewski 15; Rebs: Tarczewski 11; Asts: Hickman, Simon 4 PIR: Tarczewski 23	Boxscore	Pts: Hogue 23; Rebs: Hogue 8 Asts: Flaccadori 4 PIR: Hogue 31	Arena: Mediolanum Forum; Referees: Tolga Sahin, Manuel Mazzoni, Denny Borgioni

27 May 2017	EA7 Emporio Armani Milano	71–78 (Series: 0–2)	Dolomiti Energia Trento	Assago
20:45 (CEST)	Scoring by quarter: 16–16, 16–21, 23–16, 16–25
Rai Sport; Sky Sport	Pts: Pascolo 14; Rebs: Tarczewski 9 Asts: Cinciarini 5 PIR: Pascolo 20	Boxscore	Pts: Craft 21; Rebs: Hogue 9 Asts: Craft 5 PIR: Craft 26	Arena: Mediolanum Forum; Referees: Enrico Sabetta, Carmelo Lo Guzzo, Alessandro Vicino

29 May 2017	Dolomiti Energia Trento	66–87 (Series: 2–1)	EA7 Emporio Armani Milano	Trento
20:45 (CEST)	Scoring by quarter: 11–21, 21–21, 19–23, 15–22
Rai Sport; Sky Sport	Pts: Hogue 16; Rebs: Craft, Hogue 8 Asts: Craft 4 PIR: Hogue 19	Boxscore	Pts: Pascolo 17; Rebs: Abass 6 Asts: Cinciarini 8 PIR: Pascolo 20	Arena: PalaTrento; Referees: Massimiliano Filippini, Alessandro Martolini, Beniamino Manuel Attard

31 May 2017	Dolomiti Energia Trento	88–64 (Series: 3–1)	EA7 Emporio Armani Milano	Trento
20:45 (CEST)	Scoring by quarter: 18–15, 24–18, 24–17, 22–14
Rai Sport; Sky Sport	Pts: Gomes 21; Rebs: Gomes 10; Asts: Craft 7 PIR: Gomes 27	Boxscore	Pts: Kalnietis 14; Rebs: Kalnietis 7 Asts: three players 3 PIR: Kalnietis 17	Arena: PalaTrento; Referees: Saverio Lanzarini, Lorenzo Baldini, Mark Bartoli

2 June 2017	EA7 Emporio Armani Milano	82–102 (Series: 1–4)	Dolomiti Energia Trento	Trento
20:45 (CEST)	Scoring by quarter: 20–24, 23–22, 15–33, 24–23
Rai Sport; Sky Sport	Pts: Sanders 25; Rebs: Cinciarini 6 Asts: Cinciarini, Hickman 4 PIR: Sanders 23	Boxscore	Pts: Sutton 26; Rebs: Gomes 7 Asts: Craft 7 PIR: Sutton 32	Arena: PalaTrento; Referees: Roberto Begnis, Dino Seghetti, Michele Rossi

=== Umana Reyer Venezia v Sidigas Avellino ===
26 May 2017	Umana Reyer Venezia	73–80 (Series: 0–1)	Sidigas Avellino	Mestre, Venice
20:45 (CEST)	Scoring by quarter: 21–21, 11–11, 17–23, 24–25
Rai Sport; Sky Sport	Pts: Perić 18; Rebs: Perić 5 Asts: Haynes 6 PIR: Perić 20	Boxscore	Pts: Ragland 20; Rebs: Leunen 10; Asts: Ragland 7 PIR: Ragland 24	Arena: Taliercio; Attendance: Gianluca Mattioli, Maurizio Biggi, Lorenzo Baldini

28 May 2017	Umana Reyer Venezia	88–77 (Series: 1–1)	Sidigas Avellino	Mestre, Venice
20:45 (CEST)	Scoring by quarter: 27–15, 14–20, 25–12, 22–30
Rai Sport; Sky Sport	Pts: Perić 23; Rebs: Batista 7 Asts: Ejim 6 PIR: Perić 20	Boxscore	Pts: Logan 17; Rebs: Fesenko 6 Asts: Ragland 4 PIR: Logan, Randolph 17	Arena: Taliercio; Referees: Roberto Begnis, Michele Rossi, Fabrizio Paglialunga

30 May 2017	Sidigas Avellino	96–83 (Series: 2–1)	Umana Reyer Venezia	Avellino
20:45 (CEST)	Scoring by quarter: 20–22, 23–21, 30–22, 23–18
Rai Sport; Sky Sport	Pts: Ragland 33; Rebs: three players 7 Asts: Ragland, Green 5 PIR: Ragland 43	Boxscore	Pts: Haynes, McGee 19; Rebs: Haynes, Batista 5 Asts: Ejim 4 PIR: Haynes, McGee 19	Arena: PalaDelMauro; Referees: Dino Seghetti, Gianluca Sardella, Gabriele Bettini

1 June 2017	Sidigas Avellino	73–75 (Series: 2–2)	Umana Reyer Venezia	Avellino
20:45 (CEST)	Scoring by quarter: 17–22, 13–18, 22–16, 21–19
Rai Sport; Sky Sport	Pts: Ragland 17; Rebs: Logan, Leunen 7 Asts: Ragland 5 PIR: Leunen 25	Boxscore	Pts: Bramos 15; Rebs: Ejim, Perić 6 Asts: Filloy 3 PIR: Bramos 17	Arena: PalaDelMauro; Referees: Enrico Sabetta, Maurizio Biggi, Alessandro Vicino

3 June 2017	Umana Reyer Venezia	78–66 (Series: 3–2)	Sidigas Avellino	Mestre, Venice
20:45 (CEST)	Scoring by quarter: 19–22, 23–6, 18–22, 18–16
Rai Sport; Sky Sport	Pts: Batista, Perić 18; Rebs: Batista 10; Asts: Stone, Filloy 6 PIR: Batista 18	Boxscore	Pts: Ragland 14; Rebs: Leunen, Cusin 6 Asts: Ragland 5 PIR: Ragland 16	Arena: Taliercio; Referees: Tolga Sahin, Carmelo Lo Guzzo, Alessandro Martolini

5 June 2017	Sidigas Avellino	83–84 (Series: 2–4)	Umana Reyer Venezia	Avellino
20:45 (CEST)	Scoring by quarter: 24–21, 19–31, 13–18, 27–14
Rai Sport; Sky Sport	Pts: Logan 20; Rebs: Leunen 7 Asts: Logan 5 PIR: Logan 21	Boxscore	Pts: Perić 21; Rebs: Batista 7 Asts: Haynes 7 PIR: Haynes, Batista 16	Arena: PalaDelMauro; Referees: Saverio Lanzarini, Massimilian Filippini, Manuel Mazzoni

== Finals ==
The finals will be played in a best of seven format.

10 June 2017	Umana Reyer Venezia	74–83 (Series: 0–1)	Dolomiti Energia Trento	Mestre, Venice
21:15 (CEST)	Scoring by quarter: 16–24, 14–23, 20–21, 24–15
Rai Sport; Sky Sport	Pts: Perić 19; Rebs: Batista 11; Asts: Haynes 5 PIR: Batista 16	Boxscore	Pts: Sutton 16; Rebs: Hogue, Shields 6 Asts: Craft 7 PIR: Shields 21	Arena: Taliercio; Referees: Enrico Sabetta, Massimiliano Filippini, Michele Rossi

12 June 2017	Umana Reyer Venezia	79–64 (Series: 1–1)	Dolomiti Energia Trento	Mestre, Venice
20:45 (CEST)	Scoring by quarter: 26–19, 15–22, 24–11, 14–12
Rai Sport; Sky Sport	Pts: Haynes 20; Rebs: Perić 9 Asts: Ejim 3 PIR: Haynes 20	Boxscore	Pts: Craft 17; Rebs: Hogue 7 Asts: Flaccadori, Gomes 3 PIR: Craft 14	Arena: Taliercio; Referees: Saverio Lanzarini, Carmelo Lo Guzzo, Alessandro Martolini

14 June 2017	Dolomiti Energia Trento	67–73 (Series: 1–2)	Umana Reyer Venezia	Trento
20:45 (CEST)	Scoring by quarter: 15–20, 23–13, 15–23, 14–17
Rai Sport; Sky Sport	Pts: Craft, Forray 14; Rebs: Shields 9 Asts: Craft 6 PIR: Forray 14	Boxscore	Pts: Haynes 14; Rebs: Ejim 8 Asts: Stone 3 PIR: Stone 18	Arena: PalaTrento; Referees: Tolga Sahin Dino Seghetti, Gianluca Sardella

16 June 2017	Dolomiti Energia Trento	78–56 (Series: 2–2)	Umana Reyer Venezia	Trento
21:15 (CEST)	Scoring by quarter: 22–9, 18–22, 14–15, 24–10
Rai Sport; Sky Sport	Pts: three players 14; Rebs: Gomes 13; Asts: Hogue 4 PIR: Hogue 21	Boxscore	Pts: Filloy 12; Rebs: Ejim 7 Asts: Stone 3 PIR: Bramos 14	Arena: PalaTrento; Referees: Roberto Begnis, Manuel Mazzoni, Maurizio Biggi

18 June 2017	Umana Reyer Venezia	65–63 (Series: 3–2)	Dolomiti Energia Trento	Mestre, Venice
18:15 (CEST)	Scoring by quarter: 16–18, 12–20, 16–14, 21–11
Rai Sport; Sky Sport	Pts: Haynes 13; Rebs: Bramos 7 Asts: Ejim, Bramos 3 PIR: Stone 13	Boxscore	Pts: Hogue 17; Rebs: Craft 8 Asts: Craft 5 PIR: Craft 23	Arena: Taliercio; Referees: Tolga Sahin, Enrico Sabetta, Massimiliano Filippini

20 June 2017	Dolomiti Energia Trento	78–81 (Series: 2–4)	Umana Reyer Venezia	Trento
21:15 (CEST)	Scoring by quarter: 17–17, 19–18, 15–21, 27–25
Rai Sport; Sky Sport	Pts: Sutton 23; Rebs: Sutton, Hogue 13; Asts: Craft 7 PIR: Sutton 28	Boxscore	Pts: Ejim 15; Rebs: Stone 6 Asts: Bramos, Filloy 3 PIR: Ejim 18	Arena: PalaTrento; Referees: Roberto Begnis, Carmelo Lo Guzzo, Gianluca Sardella
