= 2017 LBA Finals =

2017 LBA finals
Team	Coach	Wins
Umana Reyer Venezia	Walter De Raffaele	4
Dolomiti Energia Trento	Maurizio Buscaglia	2
- Dates: 10–20 June 2015
- MVP: (Canada) Melvin Ejim

The 2017 LBA Finals was the championship series of the 2016–17 regular season, of the Lega Basket Serie A, known for sponsorship reasons as the Serie A PosteMobile, the highest professional basketball league in Italy, and the conclusion of the season's playoffs. The second placed Umana Reyer Venezia possessing home advantage (with the first two, the fifth and the seventh games at the Palasport Giuseppe Taliercio) and the 4th placed Dolomiti Energia Trento contested for the title in a best-of-7 showdown, from 10 to 20 June 2017. These were the first Finals for Trento and the 3rd for Venezia.

Umana Reyer Venezia won their 3rd title by beating Dolomiti Energia Trento in game 6 of the finals.

Melvin Ejim of the Umana Reyer Venezia was named MVP in the league's Finals series of the playoffs.

== Road to the finals ==
Umana Reyer Venezia		Dolomiti Energia Trento
Pos / Team / Pld / W / L / PF / PA / PD; 1 / EA7 Emporio Armani Milano / 30 / 23 / 7 / 2584 / 2384 / +200; 2 / Umana Reyer Venezia / 30 / 21 / 9 / 2447 / 2330 / +117; 3 / Sidigas Avellino / 30 / 19 / 11 / 2392 / 2285 / +107; 4 / Dolomiti Energia Trento / 30 / 18 / 12 / 2352 / 2201 / +151; 5 / Banco di Sardegna Sassari / 30 / 17 / 13 / 2301 / 2218 / +83; 6 / Grissin Bon Reggio Emilia / 30 / 17 / 13 / 2458 / 2443 / +15; 7 / The Flexx Pistoia / 30 / 15 / 15 / 2306 / 2298 / +8; 8 / Betaland Capo d'Orlando / 30 / 15 / 15 / 2291 / 2315 / −24; 9 / Enel Brindisi / 30 / 14 / 16 / 2495 / 2465 / +30; 10 / Germani Basket Brescia / 30 / 13 / 17 / 2360 / 2453 / −93; 11 / Fiat Torino / 30 / 13 / 17 / 2455 / 2551 / −96; 12 / Openjobmetis Varese / 30 / 13 / 17 / 2319 / 2402 / −83; 13 / Juvecaserta / 30 / 12 / 18 / 2337 / 2430 / −93; 14 / Red October Cantù / 30 / 11 / 19 / 2335 / 2476 / −141; 15 / Consultinvest Pesaro / 30 / 10 / 20 / 2285 / 2420 / −135; 16 / Vanoli Cremona / 30 / 9 / 21 / 2370 / 2416 / −46; Source: LBA 2nd best league record	Regular season	Pos / Team / Pld / W / L / PF / PA / PD; 1 / EA7 Emporio Armani Milano / 30 / 23 / 7 / 2584 / 2384 / +200; 2 / Umana Reyer Venezia / 30 / 21 / 9 / 2447 / 2330 / +117; 3 / Sidigas Avellino / 30 / 19 / 11 / 2392 / 2285 / +107; 4 / Dolomiti Energia Trento / 30 / 18 / 12 / 2352 / 2201 / +151; 5 / Banco di Sardegna Sassari / 30 / 17 / 13 / 2301 / 2218 / +83; 6 / Grissin Bon Reggio Emilia / 30 / 17 / 13 / 2458 / 2443 / +15; 7 / The Flexx Pistoia / 30 / 15 / 15 / 2306 / 2298 / +8; 8 / Betaland Capo d'Orlando / 30 / 15 / 15 / 2291 / 2315 / −24; 9 / Enel Brindisi / 30 / 14 / 16 / 2495 / 2465 / +30; 10 / Germani Basket Brescia / 30 / 13 / 17 / 2360 / 2453 / −93; 11 / Fiat Torino / 30 / 13 / 17 / 2455 / 2551 / −96; 12 / Openjobmetis Varese / 30 / 13 / 17 / 2319 / 2402 / −83; 13 / Juvecaserta / 30 / 12 / 18 / 2337 / 2430 / −93; 14 / Red October Cantù / 30 / 11 / 19 / 2335 / 2476 / −141; 15 / Consultinvest Pesaro / 30 / 10 / 20 / 2285 / 2420 / −135; 16 / Vanoli Cremona / 30 / 9 / 21 / 2370 / 2416 / −46; Source: LBA 4th best league record
Defeated the 7th seeded The Flexx Pistoia, 3-1	Quarterfinals	Defeated the 5th seeded Banco di Sardegna Sassari, 3-0
Defeated the 3rd seeded Sidigas Avellino, 4-2	Semifinals	Defeated the 1st seeded EA7 Emporio Armani Milano, 4-1

=== Regular season series ===
16 October 2016	Umana Reyer Venezia	59–76	Dolomiti Energia Trento	Mestre, Venice
19:00 (CEST)	Scoring by quarter: 7–22, 21–13, 21–20, 10–21
	Pts: three players 8 Rebs: Ejim 6 Asts: Tonut 5 PIR: Tonut 16	Boxscore	Pts: Jefferson 18; Rebs: Jefferson 11; Asts: Craft 7 PIR: Jefferson 24	Arena: Palasport Giuseppe Taliercio; Referees: Tolga Sahin, Luca Weidmann, Mauro Belfiore

5 February 2017	Dolomiti Energia Trento	65–57	Umana Reyer Venezia	Trento
12:00 (CEST)	Scoring by quarter: 14–11, 17–14, 16–13, 18–19
Sky Sport	Pts: Craft 18; Rebs: Hogue 7 Asts: Craft, Forray 3 PIR: Craft 26	Boxscore	Pts: Bramos 17; Rebs: Ejim 6 Asts: Viggiano 3 PIR: Bramos 20	Arena: PalaTrento; Referees: Carmelo Lo Guzzo, Emanuele Aronne, Dario Morelli

== Series ==
=== Game 1 ===
10 June 2017	Umana Reyer Venezia	74–83 (Series: 0–1)	Dolomiti Energia Trento	Mestre, Venice
21:15 (CEST)	Scoring by quarter: 16–24, 14–23, 20–21, 24–15
Rai Sport; Sky Sport	Pts: Perić 19; Rebs: Batista 11; Asts: Haynes 5 PIR: Batista 16	Boxscore	Pts: Sutton 16; Rebs: Hogue, Shields 6 Asts: Craft 7 PIR: Shields 21	Arena: Taliercio; Referees: Enrico Sabetta, Massimiliano Filippini, Michele Rossi

=== Game 2 ===
12 June 2017	Umana Reyer Venezia	79–64 (Series: 1–1)	Dolomiti Energia Trento	Mestre, Venice
20:45 (CEST)	Scoring by quarter: 26–19, 15–22, 24–11, 14–12
Rai Sport; Sky Sport	Pts: Haynes 20; Rebs: Perić 9 Asts: Ejim 3 PIR: Haynes 20	Boxscore	Pts: Craft 17; Rebs: Hogue 7 Asts: Flaccadori, Gomes 3 PIR: Craft 14	Arena: Taliercio; Referees: Saverio Lanzarini, Carmelo Lo Guzzo, Alessandro Martolini

=== Game 3 ===
14 June 2017	Dolomiti Energia Trento	67–73 (Series: 1–2)	Umana Reyer Venezia	Trento
20:45 (CEST)	Scoring by quarter: 15–20, 23–13, 15–23, 14–17
Rai Sport; Sky Sport	Pts: Craft, Forray 14; Rebs: Shields 9 Asts: Craft 6 PIR: Forray 14	Boxscore	Pts: Haynes 14; Rebs: Ejim 8 Asts: Stone 3 PIR: Stone 18	Arena: PalaTrento; Referees: Tolga Sahin Dino Seghetti, Gianluca Sardella

=== Game 4 ===
16 June 2017	Dolomiti Energia Trento	78–56 (Series: 2–2)	Umana Reyer Venezia	Trento
21:15 (CEST)	Scoring by quarter: 22–9, 18–22, 14–15, 24–10
Rai Sport; Sky Sport	Pts: three players 14; Rebs: Gomes 13; Asts: Hogue 4 PIR: Hogue 21	Boxscore	Pts: Filloy 12; Rebs: Ejim 7 Asts: Stone 3 PIR: Bramos 14	Arena: PalaTrento; Referees: Roberto Begnis, Manuel Mazzoni, Maurizio Biggi

=== Game 5 ===
18 June 2017	Umana Reyer Venezia	65–63 (Series: 3–2)	Dolomiti Energia Trento	Mestre, Venice
18:15 (CEST)	Scoring by quarter: 16–18, 12–20, 16–14, 21–11
Rai Sport; Sky Sport	Pts: Haynes 13; Rebs: Bramos 7 Asts: Ejim, Bramos 3 PIR: Stone 13	Boxscore	Pts: Hogue 17; Rebs: Craft 8 Asts: Craft 5 PIR: Craft 23	Arena: Taliercio; Referees: Tolga Sahin, Enrico Sabetta, Massimiliano Filippini

=== Game 6 ===
20 June 2017	Dolomiti Energia Trento	78–81 (Series: 2–4)	Umana Reyer Venezia	Trento
21:15 (CEST)	Scoring by quarter: 17–17, 19–18, 15–21, 27–25
Rai Sport; Sky Sport	Pts: Sutton 23; Rebs: Sutton, Hogue 13; Asts: Craft 7 PIR: Sutton 28	Boxscore	Pts: Ejim 15; Rebs: Stone 6 Asts: Bramos, Filloy 3 PIR: Ejim 18	Arena: PalaTrento; Referees: Roberto Begnis, Carmelo Lo Guzzo, Gianluca Sardella

Starters:			Pts	Reb	Ast
PF	22	(United States) Dustin Hogue	16	13	0
PG	4	(United States) Aaron Craft	11	6	7
F	31	(Denmark) Shavon Shields	2	2	0
G/F	2	(United States) Dominique Sutton	23	13	0
F	15	(Portugal) João Gomes	4	4	0
Reserves:					
SF	5	(North Macedonia) Mark Czumbel	DNP		
PG	10	(Italy) Andrés Pablo Forray	15	2	1
G	11	(Italy) Luca Conti	DNP		
SG	12	(Italy) Diego Flaccadori	7	0	2
C	25	(Italy) Luca Lechthaler	0	2	0
Head coach:
(Italy) Maurizio Buscaglia

Dolomiti Energia Trento	Umana Reyer Venezia

Serie A Finals MVP
(Canada) Melvin Ejim
Game rules
Game played under FIBA rules.

2016–17 LBA Winners

Umana Reyer Venezia
3rd title

Starters:			Pts	Reb	Ast
PG	0	(Georgia (country)) MarQuez Haynes	14	1	2
F	4	(Croatia) Hrvoje Perić	4	3	1
SF	3	(Canada) Melvin Ejim	15	5	2
SG	8	(United States) Julyan Stone	8	6	2
G/F	6	(Greece) Michael Bramos	8	5	3
Reserves:					
SF	7	(Italy) Stefano Tonut	0	1	0
SG	9	(Italy) Riccardo Visconti	DNP		
PG	12	(Italy) Ariel Filloy	14	1	3
F/C	14	(Italy) Tomas Ress	8	2	1
C	15	(Uruguay) Esteban Batista	5	3	0
SF	22	(Italy) Jeffrey Viggiano	DNP		
SG	25	(United States) Tyrus McGee	5	3	0
Head coach:
(Italy) Walter De Raffaele

== Rosters ==
=== Umana Reyer Venezia ===
Umana Reyer Venezia roster
Players
Coaches

Pos.	No.	Nat.	Name	Ht.	Wt.	Age
PG	0	(Georgia (country))	Haynes, MarQuez	1.91 m (6 ft 3 in)	84 kg (185 lb)	38 – 19 December 1986
C	2	(United States)	Hagins, Jamelle	2.06 m (6 ft 9 in)	104 kg (229 lb)	34 – 19 October 1990
SF	3	(Canada)	Ejim, Melvin	2.01 m (6 ft 7 in)	100 kg (220 lb)	34 – 4 March 1991
F	4	(Croatia)	Perić, Hrvoje	2.03 m (6 ft 8 in)	106 kg (234 lb)	39 – 25 October 1985
SG	5	(United States)	Stone, Julyan	1.98 m (6 ft 6 in)	91 kg (201 lb)	36 – 7 December 1988
G/F	6	(Greece)	Bramos, Michael	1.98 m (6 ft 6 in)	102 kg (225 lb)	37 – 27 May 1987
SG	7	(Italy)	Tonut, Stefano	1.94 m (6 ft 4 in)	90 kg (198 lb)	31 – 7 November 1993
SG	9	(Italy)	Visconti, Riccardo	1.97 m (6 ft 6 in)	80 kg (176 lb)	26 – 8 October 1998
PG	12	(Italy)	Filloy, Ariel	1.91 m (6 ft 3 in)	88 kg (194 lb)	38 – 11 March 1987
F/C	14	(Italy)	Ress, Tomas	2.08 m (6 ft 10 in)	100 kg (220 lb)	44 – 22 August 1980
C	15	(Uruguay)	Batista, Esteban	2.08 m (6 ft 10 in)	122 kg (269 lb)	41 – 2 September 1983
C	16	(Austria)	Ortner, Benjamin	2.06 m (6 ft 9 in)	100 kg (220 lb)	41 – 16 March 1983
SF	22	(Italy)	Viggiano, Jeff	1.98 m (6 ft 6 in)	98 kg (216 lb)	40 – 24 July 1984
SG	25	(United States)	McGee, Tyrus	1.88 m (6 ft 2 in)	90 kg (198 lb)	34 – 14 March 1991

Head coach

- (Italy) Walter De Raffaele

Assistant coach(es)

- (Italy) Alberto Billio
- (Italy) Alberto Buffo

Legend

- (C) Team captain
- Injured

- Roster
Updated: 2 July 2017

=== Dolomiti Energia Trento ===
Dolomiti Energia Trento roster
Players
Coaches

Pos.	No.	Nat.	Name	Ht.	Wt.	Age
G/F	2	(United States)	Sutton, Dominique	1.96 m (6 ft 5 in)	96 kg (212 lb)	38 – 20 October 1986
PG	3	(Italy)	Bernardi, Andrea	1.93 m (6 ft 4 in)	73 kg (161 lb)	27 – 2 April 1997
PG	4	(United States)	Craft, Aaron	1.88 m (6 ft 2 in)	88 kg (194 lb)	34 – 12 February 1991
F/C	8	(Italy)	Baldi Rossi, Filippo	2.07 m (6 ft 9 in)	97 kg (214 lb)	33 – 26 October 1991
SG	9	(Italy)	Moraschini, Riccardo	1.94 m (6 ft 4 in)	92 kg (203 lb)	34 – 8 January 1991
PG	10	(Italy)	Forray, Andrés Pablo (C)	1.87 m (6 ft 2 in)	87 kg (192 lb)	38 – 20 March 1986
G	11	(Italy)	Conti, Luca	1.95 m (6 ft 5 in)		24 – 20 December 2000
SG	12	(Italy)	Flaccadori, Diego	1.95 m (6 ft 5 in)	80 kg (176 lb)	28 – 5 April 1996
PF	14	(Italy)	Lovisotto, Isacco	2.05 m (6 ft 9 in)	93 kg (205 lb)	26 – 4 June 1998
F	15	(Portugal)	Gomes, João	2.01 m (6 ft 7 in)	100 kg (220 lb)	40 – 5 February 1985
PF	22	(United States)	Hogue, Dustin	1.98 m (6 ft 6 in)	100 kg (220 lb)	32 – 30 June 1992
C	25	(Italy)	Lechthaler, Luca	2.06 m (6 ft 9 in)	105 kg (231 lb)	39 – 23 February 1986
F	32	(Denmark)	Shields, Shavon	2.01 m (6 ft 7 in)		30 – 5 June 1994

Head coach

- (Italy) Maurizio Buscaglia

Assistant coach(es)

- (Italy) Vincenzo Cavazzana
- (Italy) Davide Dusmet

Legend

- (C) Team captain
- Injured

- Roster
Updated: 2 July 2017
