= Improved =

Improved may refer to:

- Improved clinch knot, a knot commonly used to secure a fishing line
- Improved-definition television (IDTV)
- Improved Touring, a category of classifications for cars in amateur road racing
- Improved Orion, an American research rocket
- LNWR Improved Precedent Class, a class of 2-4-0 steam locomotive originally designed for express passenger work

== See also ==
- Most Improved Player (disambiguation), a sports award
- Past participle of Improvement
