= 2016–17 LBA season =

Serie A PosteMobile^{1}
- Season: 2016–17
- Duration: 2 October 2016 – 20 June 2017
- Games played: 240 (Regular season); 24–41 (Playoffs)
- Teams: 16
- TV partners: RAI, Sky Italia

Regular season
- Top seed: EA7 Emporio Armani Milano
- Season MVP: (United States) Marcus Landry
- Relegated: Vanoli Cremona

Finals
- Champions: Umana Reyer Venezia (3rd title)
- Runners-up: Dolomiti Energia Trento
- Semi-finalists: EA7 Emporio Armani Milano; Sidigas Avellino
- Finals MVP: (Canada) Melvin Ejim

Awards
- Best Young Player: (Italy) Diego Flaccadori

Statistical leaders
Points	(United States) Marcus Landry	19.6
Rebounds	(Nigeria) O. D. Anosike	11.1
Assists	(Italy) Luca Vitali	7.1
Index Rating	(Hungary) Jarrod Jones	22.6

Records
- Biggest home win: Capo d'Orlando 96–53 Cantù (30 October 2016)
- Biggest away win: Vanoli Cremona 59–78 Trento (29 January 2017)
- Highest scoring: Brindisi 106–108 Reyer Venezia (7 January 2017)
- Winning streak: 10 games EA7 Emporio Armani Milano
- Losing streak: 7 games Juvecaserta; Vanoli Cremona
- Highest attendance: 11,146; EA7 Milano 93–79 Brescia (12 February 2017)
- Average attendance: 3,863
- All statistics correct as of 29 June 2017.^{1} Sponsored league name, referring to PosteMobile.

The 2016–17 LBA season, was the 95th season of the Lega Basket Serie A (LBA), known for sponsorship reasons as the Serie A PosteMobile, the highest-tier level professional basketball league in Italy. The regular season started on 2 October 2016 and finished on 7 May 2017, with the playoffs started on 12 May (dependent on an Italian club qualifying for the 2017 EuroLeague Final Four or for the 2017 Champions League Playoffs) and finished between 16 and 22 June depending on results.

As in previous years, Molten Corporation provided the official ball for all matches.

EA7 Emporio Armani Milano were the defending champions.

Umana Reyer Venezia won their 3rd title by beating Dolomiti Energia Trento in game 6 of the finals.

== Teams ==
=== Promotion and relegation (pre-season) ===
A total of 16 teams will contest the league, including 15 sides from the 2015–16 season and one promoted from the 2015–16 Serie A2.

Germani Basket Brescia is the promoted club from the Serie A2 Citroën after beating Fortitudo Bologna at game 5 of league's playoffs, and returns in the highest-tier of the Italian basketball league system after 28 years of absence from Serie A.

Brescia replaced Virtus Bologna who was relegated during the previous season.

=== Number of teams by region ===
Number of teams	Region	Team(s)
5	Lombardy	EA7 Emporio Armani Milano ^{LBA} Germani Basket Brescia ^{A2} Openjobmetis Varese; Red October Cantù; Vanoli Cremona
2	Campania	Juvecaserta; Sidigas Avellino
1	Apulia	Enel Brindisi
1	Emilia-Romagna	Grissin Bon Reggio Emilia
1	Marche	Consultinvest Pesaro
1	Piedmont	Fiat Torino
1	Sardinia	Banco di Sardegna Sassari
1	Sicily	Betaland Capo d'Orlando
1	Trentino-Alto Adige/Südtirol	Dolomiti Energia Trento
1	Tuscany	The Flexx Pistoia
1	Veneto	Umana Reyer Venezia

Notes
^LBA 2015–16 LBA champion.
^A2 2015–16 Serie A2 champion.

=== Venues and locations ===
Location of teams in 2016–17 Lega Basket Serie A

Team	Home city	Arena	Capacity	2015–16 season
Banco di Sardegna Sassari	Sassari	PalaSerradimigni	5,000	Quarterfinals 2016 playoffs
Betaland Capo d'Orlando	Capo d'Orlando	PalaFantozzi	3,508	13th in Serie A
Consultinvest Pesaro	Pesaro	Adriatic Arena	6,119	12th in Serie A
Dolomiti Energia Trento	Trento	PalaTrento	4,360	Quarterfinals 2016 playoffs
EA7 Emporio Armani Milano	Milan	Mediolanum Forum	12,700	Serie A Champions
Enel Brindisi	Brindisi	PalaPentassuglia	3,534	10th in Serie A
Fiat Torino	Turin	PalaRuffini	4,500	15th in Serie A
Germani Basket Brescia	Brescia	PalaGeorge	5,500	Serie A2 winner
Grissin Bon Reggio Emilia	Reggio Emilia	Land Rover Arena (Bologna)	5,570	Runners-up 2016 playoffs
Grissin Bon Reggio Emilia	Reggio Emilia	PalaBigi	4,600	Runners-up 2016 playoffs
Juvecaserta	Caserta	PalaMaggiò	6,387	14th in Serie A
Openjobmetis Varese	Varese	PalA2A	5,100	9th in Serie A
Red October Cantù	Cantù	PalaBancoDesio (Desio)	6,700	11th in Serie A
Sidigas Avellino	Avellino	PalaDelMauro	5,195	Semifinals 2016 playoffs
The Flexx Pistoia	Pistoia	PalaCarrara	4,000	Quarterfinals 2016 playoffs
Umana Reyer Venezia	Venice	Taliercio	3,506	Semifinals 2016 playoffs
Vanoli Cremona	Cremona	PalaRadi	3,527	Quarterfinals 2016 playoffs

=== Personnel and sponsorship ===
Team	Chairman	Head coach	Captain	Kit manufacturer	Shirt sponsor
Banco di Sardegna Sassari	(Italy) Stefano Sardara	(Italy) Federico Pasquini	(Italy) Giacomo Devecchi	Eyesportwear	Banco di Sardegna, Tirrenia Navigazione
Betaland Capo d'Orlando	(Italy) Roberto Enzo Sindoni	(Italy) Gennaro Di Carlo	(Croatia) Sandro Nicević	Legea	Betaland
Consultinvest Pesaro	(Italy) Ario Costa	(Albania) Spiro Leka	(Italy) Giulio Gazzotti	Erreà	Consultinvest, ButanGas^{1}
Dolomiti Energia Trento	(Italy) Luigi Longhi	(Italy) Maurizio Buscaglia	(Argentina) Andrés Pablo Forray	Spalding	Dolomiti Energia
EA7 Emporio Armani Milano	(Italy) Livio Proli	(Croatia) Jasmin Repeša	(Italy) Andrea Cinciarini	Armani	EA7 Emporio Armani, BMW,^{1} Aon^{2}
Enel Brindisi	(Italy) Fernando Marino	(Italy) Romeo Sacchetti	(Italy) Marco Cardillo	Bitre Sport	Enel
Fiat Torino	(Italy) Antonio Forni	(Italy) Francesco Vitucci	(Italy) Giuseppe Poeta	Spalding	Fiat Automobiles
Germani Basket Brescia	(Italy) Graziella Bragaglio	(Italy) Andrea Diana	(United States) David Moss	Erreà	Germani Trasporti, A2A
Grissin Bon Reggio Emilia	(Italy) Maria Licia Ferrarini	(Italy) Massimiliano Menetti	(Italy) Pietro Aradori	Sportika	Grissin Bon, Mapei^{1}
Juvecaserta	(Italy) Raffaele Iavazzi	(Italy) Sandro Dell'Agnello	(Italy) Marco Giuri	Givova	Pasta Reggia, Fortune Investment & Co.
Openjobmetis Varese	(Italy) Stefano Coppa	(Italy) Attilio Caja	(Italy) Daniele Cavaliero	Spalding	Openjobmetis, Teva
Red October Cantù	(Russia) Dmitry Gerasimenko	(Italy) Carlo Recalcati	(Italy) Craig Callahan	Macron	Red October, Intesa Sanpaolo^{1}
Sidigas Avellino	(Italy) Giuseppe Sampietro	(Italy) Stefano Sacripanti	(North Macedonia) Marques Green	Joma	Sidigas
The Flexx Pistoia	(Italy) Roberto Maltinti	(Italy) Vincenzo Esposito	(Italy) Michele Antonutti	Erreà	The Flexx, Conad, Hitachi
Umana Reyer Venezia	(Italy) Luigi Brugnaro	(Italy) Walter De Raffaele	(Italy) Tomas Ress	Erreà	Umana
Vanoli Cremona	(Italy) Aldo Vanoli	(Italy) Paolo Lepore	(Italy) Fabio Mian	Erreà	Vanoli Ferramenta

1. On the back of shirt.
2. On the shorts.

=== Managerial Changes ===
Team	Outgoing manager	Manner of departure	Date of vacancy	Position in table	Replaced with	Date of appointment
Enel Brindisi	(Italy) Piero Bucchi	Signed with Consultinvest Pesaro	24 April 2016	Pre-season	(Italy) Romeo Sacchetti	5 May 2016
Consultinvest Pesaro	(Italy) Riccardo Paolini	End of contract	30 May 2016	Pre-season	(Italy) Piero Bucchi	1 June 2016
Red October Cantù	(Russia) Sergei Bazarevich	End of contract	30 June 2016	Pre-season	(Lithuania) Rimas Kurtinaitis	2 August 2016
Red October Cantù	(Lithuania) Rimas Kurtinaitis	Resigned	30 November 2016	14th (2–7)	(Ukraine) Kyrylo Bol'shakov (interim)	1 November 2016
Vanoli Cremona	(Italy) Cesare Pancotto	Sacked	13 December 2016	16th (2–9)	(Italy) Paolo Lepore	13 December 2016
Openjobmetis Varese	(Italy) Paolo Moretti	Sacked	22 December 2016	14th (4–8)	(Italy) Attilio Caja	23 December 2016
Red October Cantù	(Ukraine) Kyrylo Bol'shakov	End of interim spell	27 February 2017	13th (7–13)	(Italy) Carlo Recalcati	27 February 2017
Consultinvest Pesaro	(Italy) Piero Bucchi	Resigned	7 March 2017	15th (7–14)	(Albania) Spiro Leka	9 March 2017

== Changes from 2015–16 ==
=== New League's Title Sponsor ===
From the end of the 2015–16 season, Lega Basket Serie A has a new sponsor. The Turkish brand Beko left Serie A after four years of sponsorship. Beko decided to focus just on their sponsorship of the Spanish football team Barcelona.

In December 2016, took place in Rome the assembly of Lega Basket during which the president Egidio Bianchi has communicated to all the clubs to have reached the multi-year agreement with PosteMobile, an Italy-based mobile virtual network operator owned by Poste italiane Group, that will become the Title Sponsor of the LBA.

== Rules ==
Each team is allowed either five or seven foreign players under two formulas:

1. 5 foreigners from countries outside the European Union
2. 3 foreigners from countries outside the E.U., 4 foreigners from E.U. countries (also including those from countries signatory of the Cotonou Agreement)

Each club can choose the 5+5 formula, that consists of five Italian players and five foreign players, and the 3+4+5 formula, with five Italian players, three foreigners from countries outside the E.U. and four foreigners from E.U. countries or "Cotonou Countries".

At the end of the season there will be a prize of €500,000 for the top three ranked teams, that had chosen the 5+5 formula, considering the playing time of Italian players, and €200,000 for those teams that will obtain the best results with their youth sector.

== Regular season ==
In the regular season, teams play against each other home-and-away in a round-robin format. The eight first qualified teams will advance to the Playoffs, the last seven qualified teams will be eliminated, while the last one qualified team will be relegated and replaced by the winner of the playoffs of the second-level Serie A2 Basket. The matchdays are from 2 October 2016 to 7 May 2017.

=== League table ===
Pos	Team	Pld	W	L	PF	PA	PD	Qualification or relegation
1	EA7 Emporio Armani Milano	30	23	7	2584	2384	+200	Qualification to playoffs
2	Umana Reyer Venezia	30	21	9	2447	2330	+117	Qualification to playoffs
3	Sidigas Avellino	30	19	11	2392	2285	+107	Qualification to playoffs
4	Dolomiti Energia Trento	30	18	12	2352	2201	+151	Qualification to playoffs
5	Banco di Sardegna Sassari	30	17	13	2301	2218	+83	Qualification to playoffs
6	Grissin Bon Reggio Emilia	30	17	13	2458	2443	+15	Qualification to playoffs
7	The Flexx Pistoia	30	15	15	2306	2298	+8	Qualification to playoffs
8	Betaland Capo d'Orlando	30	15	15	2291	2315	−24	Qualification to playoffs
9	Enel Brindisi	30	14	16	2495	2465	+30	
10	Germani Basket Brescia	30	13	17	2360	2453	−93	
11	Fiat Torino	30	13	17	2455	2551	−96	
12	Openjobmetis Varese	30	13	17	2319	2402	−83	
13	JuveCaserta	30	12	18	2337	2430	−93	
14	Red October Cantù	30	11	19	2335	2476	−141	
15	Consultinvest Pesaro	30	10	20	2285	2420	−135	
16	Vanoli Cremona (R)	30	9	21	2370	2416	−46	Relegation to Serie A2

Source: LBA
(R) Relegated

=== Results ===
Home \ Away	SAS	ORL	PES	TRE	EA7	BRI	TOR	BRE	REG	CAS	VAR	CTU	AVE	PIS	VEN	CRE
Banco di Sardegna Sassari		74–64	86–59	69–66	75–82	79–78	96–64	96–73	82–72	95–77	78–72	80–65	70–75	81–75	85–89	82–83
Betaland Capo d'Orlando	72–65		98–88	63–71	65–71	86–82	90–77	71–67	59–62	74–71	76–71	96–53	68–76	79–64	90–82	79–76
Consultinvest Pesaro	76–71	70–68		73–78	90–79	96–102	65–66	76–63	81–91	83–67	83–87	78–73	55–60	57–59	84–78	63–73
Dolomiti Energia Trento	57–66	85–76	97–91		74–92	84–48	70–74	99–59	80–84	76–66	84–68	68–77	77–75	99–91	65–57	90–77
EA7 Emporio Armani Milano	86–77	90–74	88–84	76–98		99–86	81–74	93–79	99–79	100–80	79–71	89–71	87–81	104–70	88–80	86–78
Enel Brindisi	76–61	87–75	93–94	69–61	70–68		87–79	83–91	78–82	100–72	80–58	90–82	94–74	86–85	106–108	94–82
Fiat Torino	79–87	91–92	83–79	76–67	97–100	90–88		86–91	85–73	80–77	89–76	87–76	84–79	91–95	90–93	85–82
Germani Basket Brescia	56–48	89–90	99–68	74–80	80–97	81–91	96–89		93–88	64–62	78–87	76–56	91–87	97–79	79–84	95–66
Grissin Bon Reggio Emilia	86–80	80–70	87–80	75–87	91–87	98–84	91–80	103–70		85–86	73–68	90–77	89–90	77–68	85–79	66–83
Juvecaserta	77–70	91–86	82–87	84–67	74–78	86–82	83–76	89–83	78–75		80–86	79–85	82–86	74–65	58–61	79–75
Openjobmetis Varese	76–83	74–72	93–78	83–80	82–98	91–81	79–86	68–74	81–71	93–74		82–92	77–79	75–70	60–73	78–75
Red October Cantù	90–69	73–79	77–68	77–91	79–85	83–77	77–89	81–65	98–83	82–83	72–85		75–74	73–71	92–99	72–71
Sidigas Avellino	77–65	94–65	79–62	79–69	80–68	76–73	86–83	92–79	81–86	79–75	75–82	92–86		83–67	78–80	85–78
The Flexx Pistoia	68–69	75–59	87–83	84–78	85–74	89–81	89–73	86–62	85–71	77–64	97–64	94–87	67–59		71–78	64–59
Umana Reyer Venezia	71–84	84–69	85–61	59–76	88–84	86–65	89–70	78–70	73–74	98–92	87–81	93–72	78–75	74–62		81–73
Vanoli Cremona	77–78	82–86	71–73	59–78	72–76	69–84	117–82	80–86	101–91	82–95	85–71	93–82	73–86	87–67	91–82	

Source: LBA
Legend: Blue = home team win; Yellow = draw; Red = away team win.

=== Positions by round ===
The table lists the positions of teams after completion of each round.

Team \ Round	1	2	3	4	5	6	7	8	9	10	11	12	13	14	15	16	17	18	19	20	21	22	23	24	25	26	27	28	29	30
EA7 Emporio Armani Milano	4	2	1	1	1	1	1	1	1	1	1	1	1	1	1	1	1	1	1	1	1	1	1	1	1	1	1	1	1	1
Umana Reyer Venezia	6	1	7	6	7	8	5	5	4	3	3	2	2	2	2	2	2	2	3	3	2	2	2	2	2	2	2	2	2	2
Sidigas Avellino	8	3	5	4	2	2	3	3	3	4	4	4	4	3	3	3	3	3	2	2	3	3	3	3	3	3	3	3	3	3
Dolomiti Energia Trento	14	7	2	3	4	6	11	12	11	12	13	11	11	13	13	11	12	11	6	4	4	6	5	4	4	6	6	5	6	4
Banco di Sardegna Sassari	5	10	6	8	5	4	6	7	8	8	8	9	8	7	6	5	4	6	4	6	5	5	6	6	7	4	4	4	4	5
Grissin Bon Reggio Emilia	10	8	4	5	3	3	2	2	2	2	2	3	3	4	4	4	7	4	5	5	7	8	7	7	5	5	5	6	5	6
The Flexx Pistoia	16	12	13	13	9	10	15	9	12	9	11	10	9	9	9	9	11	9	7	9	9	11	11	10	8	8	8	7	7	7
Betaland Capo d'Orlando	13	15	9	14	8	9	7	6	6	7	6	6	7	5	5	7	5	5	8	7	6	4	4	5	6	7	7	8	9	8
Enel Brindisi	3	11	16	15	11	7	8	8	7	6	7	7	5	6	8	12	9	12	10	11	10	9	8	8	9	10	9	9	8	9
Germani Basket Brescia	15	14	11	16	16	16	12	11	10	11	10	12	12	10	7	8	10	8	9	8	8	10	10	12	12	9	10	10	11	10
Fiat Torino	9	9	10	9	13	11	10	10	9	10	9	8	10	11	11	10	6	10	11	10	11	7	9	9	10	11	11	11	12	11
Openjobmetis Varese	12	4	14	10	10	13	9	13	13	14	14	14	14	14	16	16	14	15	16	16	14	14	13	13	11	12	12	12	10	12
Juvecaserta	7	13	3	2	6	5	4	4	5	5	5	5	6	8	10	6	8	7	12	12	12	13	14	14	14	14	14	14	14	13
Red October Cantù	11	16	12	7	12	12	14	14	14	13	12	13	13	12	12	13	13	13	13	13	13	12	12	11	13	13	13	13	13	14
Consultinvest Pesaro	2	5	15	11	14	14	13	15	16	15	15	15	15	15	14	14	15	14	14	14	15	15	15	15	16	15	15	15	15	15
Vanoli Cremona	1	6	8	12	15	15	16	16	15	16	16	16	16	16	15	15	16	16	15	15	16	16	16	16	15	16	16	16	16	16

Updated to games played on 7 May 2017
Source: LBA

Leader of the Regular Season
Qualification to Playoffs
Relegation to Serie A2

== Playoffs ==
The LBA playoffs quarterfinals are best-of-five, while the semifinals and finals series are best-of-seven. The playoffs will start on 12 May 2017 to finish between 16 and 22 June depending on result.

Quarter-finals
1	EA7 Emporio Armani Milano	3
8	Betaland Capo d'Orlando	1
4	Dolomiti Energia Trento	3
5	Banco di Sardegna Sassari	0
2	Umana Reyer Venezia	3
7	The Flexx Pistoia	1
3	Sidigas Avellino	3
6	Grissin Bon Reggio Emilia	0

Semifinals
1	EA7 Emporio Armani Milano	1
4	Dolomiti Energia Trento	4
2	Umana Reyer Venezia	4
3	Sidigas Avellino	2

Final
4	Dolomiti Energia Trento	2
2	Umana Reyer Venezia	4

== Final standings ==
Pos	Team	Pld	W	L	PF	PA	PD	Qualification or relegation
1	Umana Reyer Venezia (C, O)	46	32	14	2447	2330	+117	Qualification to Champions League group stage
2	Dolomiti Energia Trento	44	27	17	2352	2201	+151	Qualification to EuroCup
3	EA7 Emporio Armani Milano	39	27	12	2584	2384	+200	Qualification to EuroLeague
4	Sidigas Avellino	39	24	15	2392	2285	+107	Qualification to Champions League group stage
5	Banco di Sardegna Sassari	33	17	16	2301	2218	+83	Qualification to Champions League group stage
6	Grissin Bon Reggio Emilia	33	17	16	2458	2443	+15	Qualification to EuroCup
7	The Flexx Pistoia (Note: The Flexx Pistoia resigned to play European competitions for the 2017–18 season.)	34	16	18	2306	2298	+8	
8	Betaland Capo d'Orlando	34	16	18	2291	2315	−24	Qualification to Champions League qualifying rounds
9	Enel Brindisi	30	14	16	2495	2465	+30	
10	Germani Basket Brescia	30	13	17	2360	2453	−93	
11	Fiat Torino	30	13	17	2455	2551	−96	Qualification to EuroCup
12	Openjobmetis Varese	30	13	17	2319	2402	−83	
13	Juvecaserta	30	12	18	2337	2430	−93	
14	Red October Cantù	30	11	19	2335	2476	−141	
15	Consultinvest Pesaro	30	10	20	2285	2420	−135	
16	Vanoli Cremona (R)	30	9	21	2370	2416	−46	Relegation to Serie A2 Basket

Source: LBA
(C) Champions; (O) Play-off winners; (R) Relegated

== Individual statistics ==
As of 7 May 2017.

=== Points ===
Rank	Name	Team	PPG
1.	(United States) Marcus Landry	Germani Basket Brescia	19.6
2.	(Dominican Republic) Édgar Sosa	Juvecaserta	19.3
3.	(Hungary) Jarrod Jones	Consultinvest Pesaro	19.2
4.	(United States) JaJuan Johnson	Red October Cantù	19.0
5.	(Liberia) Joe Ragland	Enel Brindisi	17.8

=== Assists ===
Rank	Name	Team	APG
1.	(Italy) Luca Vitali	Germani Basket Brescia	7.1
2.	(Dominican Republic) Édgar Sosa	Juvecaserta	5.9
3.	(United States) Chris Wright	Fiat Torino	5.5
4.	(United States) Eric Maynor	Openjobmetis Varese	5.5
5.	(United States) Zabian Dowdell	Red October Cantù	5.4

=== Steals ===
Rank	Name	Team	SPG
1.	(United States) Aaron Craft	Dolomiti Energia Trento	2.0
2.	(North Macedonia) Marques Green	Sidigas Avellino	1.8
3.	(United States) David Moss	Germani Basket Brescia	1.7
4.	(Liberia) Joe Ragland	Sidigas Avellino	1.6
5.	(Hungary) Jarrod Jones	Consultinvest Pesaro	1.5

=== Rebounds ===
Rank	Name	Team	RPG
1.	(Nigeria) O. D. Anosike	Openjobmetis Varese	11.1
2.	(Hungary) Jarrod Jones	Consultinvest Pesaro	10.1
3.	(United States) Mitchell Watt	Juvecaserta	9.0
4.	(United States) Deron Washington	Fiat Torino	8.6
5.	(United States) D. J. White	Fiat Torino	8.0

=== Blocks ===
Rank	Name	Team	BPG
1.	(Antigua and Barbuda) Norvel Pelle	Openjobmetis Varese	2.1
2.	(Italy) Riccardo Cervi	Grissin Bon Reggio Emilia	2.0
3.	(United States) Mitchell Watt	Juvecaserta	1.8
4.	(United States) JaJuan Johnson	Red October Cantù	1.4
5.	(Nigeria) Gani Lawal	Banco di Sardegna Sassari	1.3

=== Valuation ===
Rank	Name	Team	VPG
1.	(Hungary) Jarrod Jones	Consultinvest Pesaro	22.6
2.	(United States) JaJuan Johnson	Red October Cantù	21.3
3.	(United States) Mitchell Watt	Juvecaserta	19.9
4.	(United States) D. J. White	Fiat Torino	19.6
5.	(Liberia) Joe Ragland	Sidigas Avellino	18.4

=== Individual game highs ===
Category	Player	Team	Statistic
PIR	(United States) JaJuan Johnson	Red October Cantù	46
PIR	(United States) Terran Petteway	The Flexx Pistoia	46
Points	(United States) Terran Petteway	The Flexx Pistoia	43
Rebounds	(Nigeria) O. D. Anosike	Openjobmetis Varese	21
Assists	(Italy) Luca Vitali	Germani Basket Brescia	18
Blocks	(Netherlands Antilles) Norvel Pelle	Openjobmetis Varese	7
Three pointers	(United States) Terran Petteway	The Flexx Pistoia	10

Updated: 16 May 2017. Source: LBA

== Awards ==
=== Finals MVP ===
- (Canada) Melvin Ejim (Umana Reyer Venezia)

=== Most Valuable Player ===
- (United States) Marcus Landry (Germani Basket Brescia)

=== Best Player Under 22 ===
- (Italy) Diego Flaccadori (Dolomiti Energia Trento)

=== Best Coach ===
- (Italy) Vincenzo Esposito (The Flexx Pistoia)

=== Best Executive ===
- (Italy) Giuseppe Sindoni (Betaland Capo d'Orlando)

=== Round MVP ===
Round	Player	Team	PIR	Ref
1	(Italy) Stefano Tonut	Umana Reyer Venezia	35	
2	(United States) D. J. White	Fiat Torino	35	
3	(Belgium) Retin Obasohan	Sidigas Avellino	28	
4	(United States) D. J. White (2)	Fiat Torino	28	
5	(Italy) Pietro Aradori	Grissin Bon Reggio Emilia	35	
6	(Italy) Bruno Fitipaldo	Betaland Capo d'Orlando	44	
7	(United States) Deron Washington	Fiat Torino	32	
8	(United States) Terran Petteway	The Flexx Pistoia	46	
9	(United States) Tu Holloway	Vanoli Cremona	42	
10	(Dominican Republic) Edgar Sosa	Juvecaserta	33	
11	(United States) JaJuan Johnson	Red October Cantù	46	
12	(United States) David Lighty	Dolomiti Energia Trento	36	
13	(Italy) Pietro Aradori (2)	Grissin Bon Reggio Emilia	25	
14	(United States) Tashawn Thomas	Vanoli Cremona	35	
15	(Croatia) Krunoslav Simon	EA7 Emporio Armani Milano	34	
16	(Croatia) Rok Stipčević	Banco di Sardegna Sassari	29	
16	(Croatia) Hrvoje Perić	Umana Reyer Venezia	29	
17	(Ukraine) Kyrylo Fesenko	Sidigas Avellino	36	
18	(Italy) Achille Polonara	Grissin Bon Reggio Emilia	32	
19	(United States) Nic Moore	Enel Brindisi	25	
19	(United States) Nathan Boothe	The Flexx Pistoia	25	
20	(United States) Marcus Landry	Germani Basket Brescia	32	
21	(United States) Jamel McLean	EA7 Emporio Armani Milano	29	
21	(United States) JaJuan Johnson (2)	Red October Cantù	29	
22	(United States) JaJuan Johnson (3)	Red October Cantù	39	
23	(United States) Dominique Sutton	Dolomiti Energia Trento	26	
23	(United States) Dominique Johnson	Openjobmetis Varese	26	
24	(United States) Trevor Lacey	Banco di Sardegna Sassari	30	
25	(United States) Ronald Moore	The Flexx Pistoia	36	
26	(United States) Rotnei Clarke	Consultinvest Pesaro	43	
27	(United States) JaJuan Johnson (4)	Red October Cantù	34	
28	(United States) Mitchell Watt	Juvecaserta	39	
29	(Hungary) Jarrod Jones	Consultinvest Pesaro	36	
30	(United States) Mitchell Watt (2)	Juvecaserta	31	
30	(United States) Dominique Sutton	Dolomiti Energia Trento	31	

== Serie A clubs in European competitions ==
Team	Competition	Progress	Ref
EA7 Emporio Armani Milano	EuroLeague	Regular season	
Banco di Sardegna Sassari	Basketball Champions League	Quarter-finals	
Openjobmetis Varese	Basketball Champions League	Regular season	
Sidigas Avellino	Basketball Champions League	Round of 16	
Umana Reyer Venezia	Basketball Champions League	Semi-finals	

Source: EuroLeague Champions League

== Supercup ==
The 2016 Italian Supercup was the 22nd edition of the super cup tournament of the Italian basketball. It opened the season on 24 and 25 September 2016. It was contested in Milan's Mediolanum Forum.

Qualified for the tournament were league winners and cup winners EA7 Emporio Armani Milano, cup finalists Sidigas Avellino, cup semifinalists Vanoli Cremona and league finalist Grissin Bon Reggio Emilia.

EA7 Emporio Armani Milano lifted the Supercup trophy by downing Sidigas Avellino 72-90. Krunoslav Simon led the winners with 25 points on 5-of-7 three-point shots. Ricky Hickman added 15 while Zoran Dragić had 11 for Milan. Hickman had 9 points in the second quarter to make Milan get a double-digit lead, 34-44, at halftime. Dragić, Simon and Davide Pascolo allowed Milan to extend their margin to 51-67 after 30 minutes, enough to control the game until the final buzzer and lift its first Supercup trophy.

== Cup ==
The 49th edition of the Italian Cup, knows as the PosteMobile Final Eight for sponsorship reasons, was contested between 16 and 19 February 2017 in Rimini. Eight teams qualified for the Final Eight were the best ranked teams at the end of the first stage of the 2016–17 Serie A season.

EA7 Emporio Armani Milano rallied to beat Grissin Bon Reggio Emilia 84-87 and reach the finals. In Sunday's final, Milan will play Banco di Sardegna Sassari which downed Germani Basket Brescia 77-70.

EA7 Emporio Armani Milano successfully defended the Italian Cup with an 84-74 come-from-behind win over Banco di Sardegna Sassari in the final on Sunday. Ricky Hickman made 5 of 7 shots from downtown en route to 25 points, Rakim Sanders scored 15 points and Milan Mačvan added 11 for the winners. Sassari took charge from the start with a 2-13 run and led 11-19 after 10 minutes. A Josh Carter triple made it 15-25 midway through the second quarter, but Sanders heated up as Milan fought back and Hickman's triple to end the half drew Milan within 34-36. A three by Sanders to open the second half gave Milan its first lead. Hickman netted another three and Davide Pascolo converted a three-point play to boost the margin to 46-40. Andrea Cinciarini further extended the margin to 9 before strong play by Gani Lawal sparked a Sassari comeback. A David Bell jumper made it 56-54 through three quarters. It was still a 2-point game four minutes into the fourth quarter when Hickman and Macvan combined for all Milan's points in an 11-2 march to take a 75-64 advantage with 3:38 remaining. Sassari raced back with 8 straight points, but was held to a single basket over the final two minutes as Milan closed out the game from the line. Trevor Lacey paced Sassari with 15 points, Lawal scored 13 and Rok Stipčević 11.

Ricky Hickman was named Finals MVP of the competition.
