= Dolomiti Energia =

Dolomiti Energia S.p.A.
- Type: Public
- Industry: Energy industry
- Predecessor: Trentino Servizi; Dolomiti Energia
- Founded: 2009
- Headquarters: Trento, Italy
- Area served: Italy
- Key people: Stefano Granella (CEO); Silvia Arlanch (Chairman)
- Products: Natural gas Electric power
- Revenue: €1.420 billion (2019)
- Number of employees: 1,961 (2019)
- Website: www.gruppodolomitienergia.it

Dolomiti Energia S.p.A. is an energy company in the field of electricity and natural gas headquartered in Trento, Italy. The company was established in 2009. Dolomiti Energia employs about 1,961 people in Italy. Chairman of the board is Silvia Arlanch and chief executive officer is Stefano Granella.

== History ==
Dolomiti Energia was established in 2009 in Trento with the merger of Dolomiti Energia and Trentino Servizi. Dolomiti Energia was the majority shareholder of the hydroelectric power stations of Trentino Alto Adige and Trentino Servizi takes its name becoming the new Dolomiti Energia.

In September 2009, Dolomiti Energia acquired the majority of Multiutility S.p.A. headquartered in Verona, and during the same year it acquired 100% of Avisio Energia, which will change its name into Dolomiti Reti S.p.A.. In 2010 Dolomiti Energia acquired PVB Power Bulgaria, an energy company in the field of hydroelectricity in Bulgaria. In March 2021, the share package was sold for 5 millions of euros to Akuo, a group founded by a club of former managers of EDF who worked in Bulgaria.

In November 2011 it was established Sf Energy, a joint venture between Dolomiti Energia, Sel and Enel Produzione for the management of the hydroelectric plant of San Floriano del Collio. In 2012 Dolomiti Energia became shareholder for the 7% of Edipower S.p.A.. Dolomiti Energia is the main sponsor of Aquila Trento, which play in Serie A.

In July 2016, Dolomiti Energia Trading debuted at European Energy Exchange.

Dolomiti Energia, although many shareholders are public entities, is able to sponsor the sports club Aquila Basket Trento which plays in the top Italian basketball league (Serie A). He took second place in the 2016/17 season and in the 2017/18 season.

== Activity ==
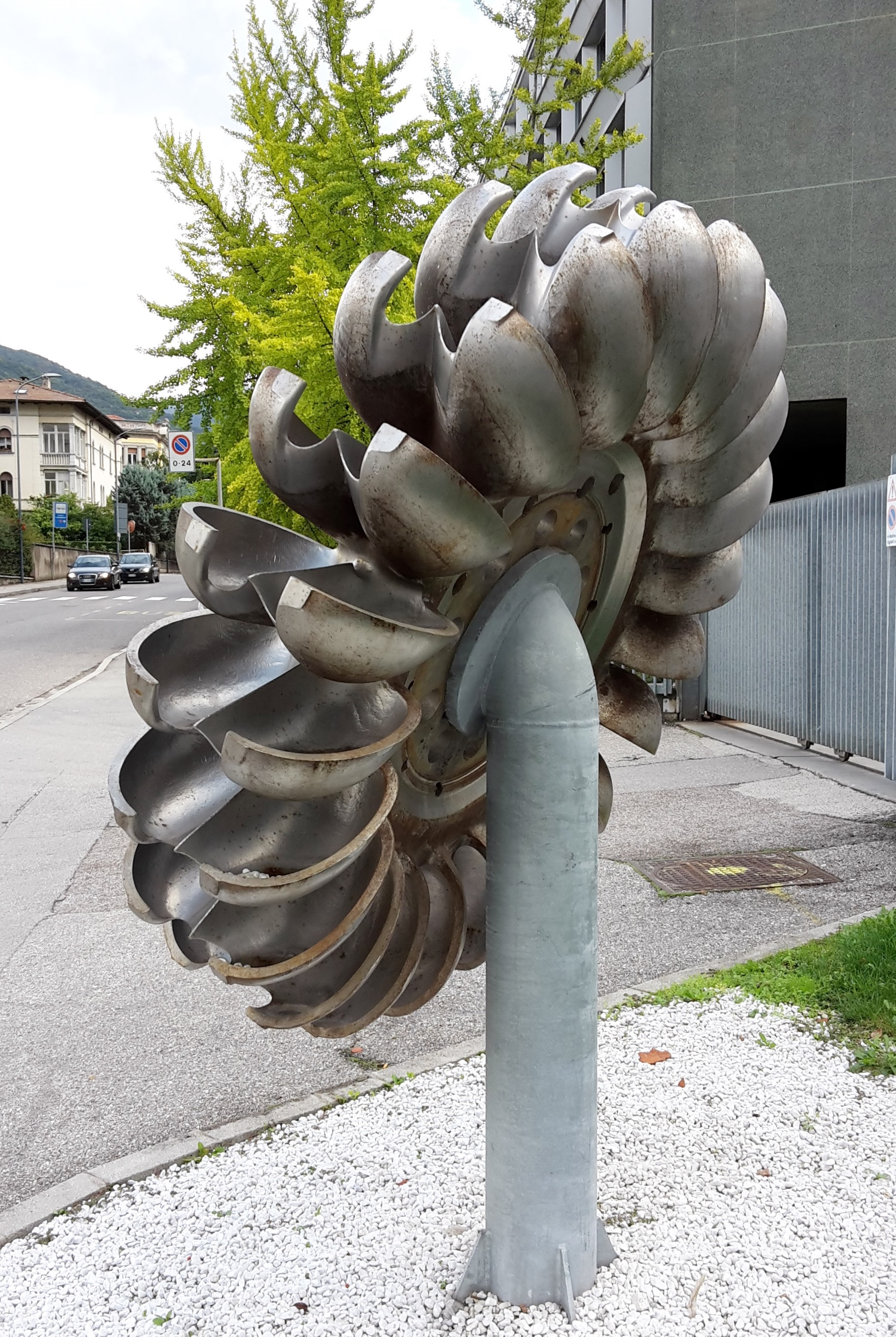
Example of a Pelton wheel outside the headquarters in Rovereto

The Group's operating statement in 2012 gave the following data:

- Electric Energy
  - customers connected to the grid: 300.688
  - km medium voltage network: 3.089
  - km low voltage network: 6.544
  - Gwh energy produced: 1.850
  - Gwh energy distributed: 2.400
  - Gwh energy sold: 3.824
- Natural Gas
  - customers connected to the natural gas network: 146.780
  - km natural gas network: 2.241
  - m³ natural gas distributed: 289.000.000
  - m³ natural gas sold: 428.000.000
- Environment
  - Tons of waste collected: 76.364
  - Recycling Trento: 66.78%
  - Recycling Rovereto: 60.86%
- Water
  - Aqueduct users: 84.841
  - Aqueducts under management: 17 (oltre 200.000 abitanti)
  - Sewage treatment plants: 16
  - km water supply network managed: 1.338
  - m³ of water delivered to the grid: 32.000.000
- District heating and cogeneration
  - Gwh steam produced: 63.4
  - Gwh heat produced: 61.4

== Major shareholders ==
As of 2011 members of Dolomiti Energia are:

- Private shareholders

- FT Energia: 11.80 %
- A2A: 7.9%
- Fondazione Caritro: 5.3%
- ISA: 4.1%
- EnerGo: 1.8

- Public shareholders

- FinDolomiti Energia: 47.8%
- Comune of Trento: 5.8%
- Comune of Rovereto: 4.3%
- Other comuni: 2.8%
- Bacino imbrifero montano–BIM: 2.0%

- Local multi-utility

- STET: 1.8%
- AGS: 1.2%
- AIR: 1.0%
- ACSM Primiero: 0.8%
- Other companies: 1.6%
