= Ariel Filloy =

Argentine-Italian basketball player

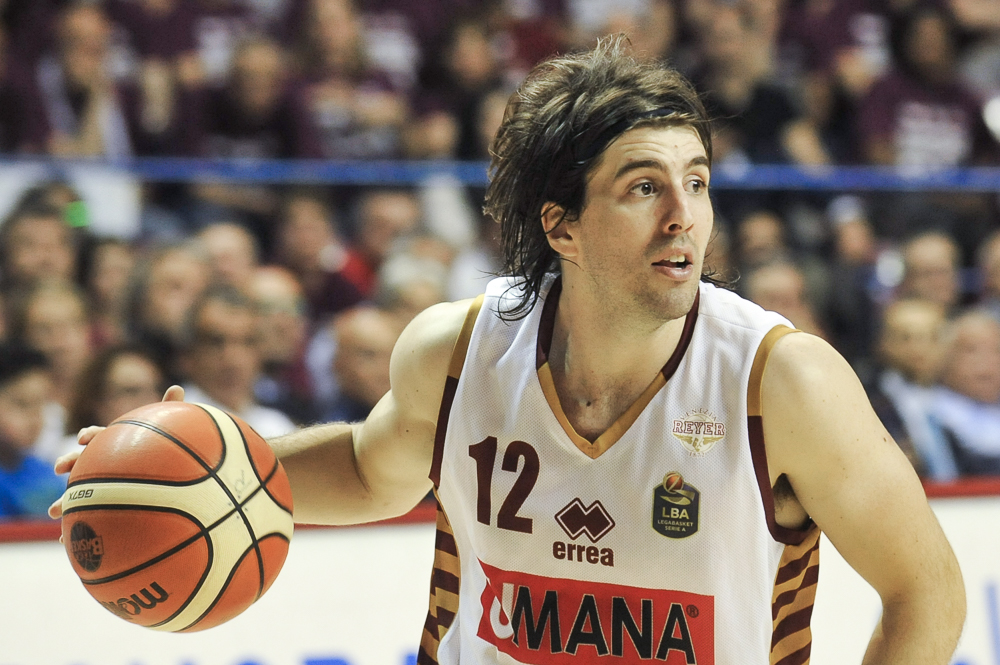
- Filloy with Reyer Venezia in 2017

Free Agent
- Position: Point guard

Personal information
- Born: 11 March 1987 (age 39) Córdoba, Argentina
- Listed height: 1.90 m (6 ft 3 in)
- Listed weight: 85 kg (187 lb)

Career information
- NBA draft: 2009: undrafted
- Playing career: 2003–present

Career history
- 2003–2004: Dinamo Sassari
- 2004–2008: Rimini Crabs
- 2008–2012: Olimpia Milano
- 2009: →Vanoli Soresina
- 2009–2010: →Scafati
- 2010–2011: →Pistoia
- 2012–2013: Trieste
- 2013–2014: Reggiana
- 2014–2016: Pistoia
- 2016–2017: Reyer Venezia
- 2017–2019: Scandone Avellino
- 2019–2020: Reyer Venezia
- 2020–2021: Victoria Libertas Pesaro
- 2021–2023: Derthona Basket
- 2023–2024: Trieste

Career highlights
- Italian League champion (2017); EuroChallenge winner (2014)
Medals
Men's basketball
Representing Italy
European U-20 Championship
Bronze medal – third place	2007 Slovenia/Italy

Ariel Filloy (born 11 March 1987) is an Argentine-Italian professional basketball player who last played for Pallacanestro Trieste.. He also plays for the Italian national basketball team.

His father Germán Filloy and elder brother Demián Filloy also played basketball professionally.

== Professional career ==
After a period in the second league of the Italian basketball league system, with Dinamo Sassari and Basket Rimini Crabs, he began his Italian LBA experience in 2008, when Armani Jeans Milano offered him a contract until 2012. Filloy played with Milano in the 2008–09 and 2011–12 seasons; between the two seasons he was sent on loan to Vanoli Soresina, and in Serie A2 with Bialetti Scafati and Pistoia Basket.

The player was released by Olimpia Milano in August 2012. He returned to Serie A2 with AcegasAps Trieste.

In summer 2013 he joined the LBA league side Pallacanestro Reggiana. In that season he won the FIBA EuroChallenge.

Filloy returned to Pistoia Basket and played with them two seasons until 2016.

At the end of the 2015–16 season, he signed with Umana Reyer Venezia.

On 5 July 2019 he signed with Reyer Venezia of the Italian Lega Basket Serie A (LBA).

On 10 August 2020 Filloy joined VL Pesaro for the pre-season. Then, on 20 August, he was signed for the rest of the season.

On 9 July 2021 Filloy signed with the newly promoted Derthona Basket.
