= Andrea Crosariol =

Italian basketball player (born 1984)

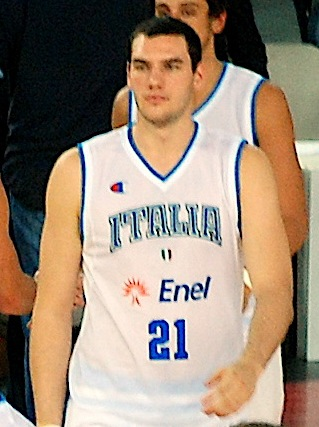

Personal information
- Born: 11 November 1984 (age 41) Milan, Italy
- Listed height: 2.11 m (6 ft 11 in)
- Listed weight: 114 kg (250.8 lb)

Career information
- High school: The Winchendon School (Winchendon, Massachusetts)
- College: Fairleigh Dickinson (2003–2006)
- NBA draft: 2006: undrafted
- Playing career: 2006–2019
- Position: Center

Career history
- 2006: Benetton Treviso
- 2006–2008: →Virtus Bologna
- 2008: →Virtus Roma
- 2008–2009: →Scandone Avellino
- 2009–2012: Virtus Roma
- 2012–2013: VL Pesaro
- 2013–2014: Oldenburg
- 2014: Reyer Venezia
- 2014–2015: Włocławek
- 2015–2016: Viola Reggio Calabria
- 2016–2017: Pistoia
- 2017–2018: Cantù
- 2018–2019: Pallacanestro Piacentina
- 2019: Pistoia

Career highlights
- Italian League champion (2006)

Andrea Crosariol (born 11 November 1984) is an Italian assistant coach and former professional basketball player and who last played for Pistoia Basket of the Italian Lega Basket Serie A (LBA). At 211 cm (6 ft 11 in), he plays the center position. In the years 2003–2006 he played for the Fairleigh Dickinson University in the NCAA's Northeast Conference.
