= Melvin Ejim =

Canadian-Nigerian basketball player

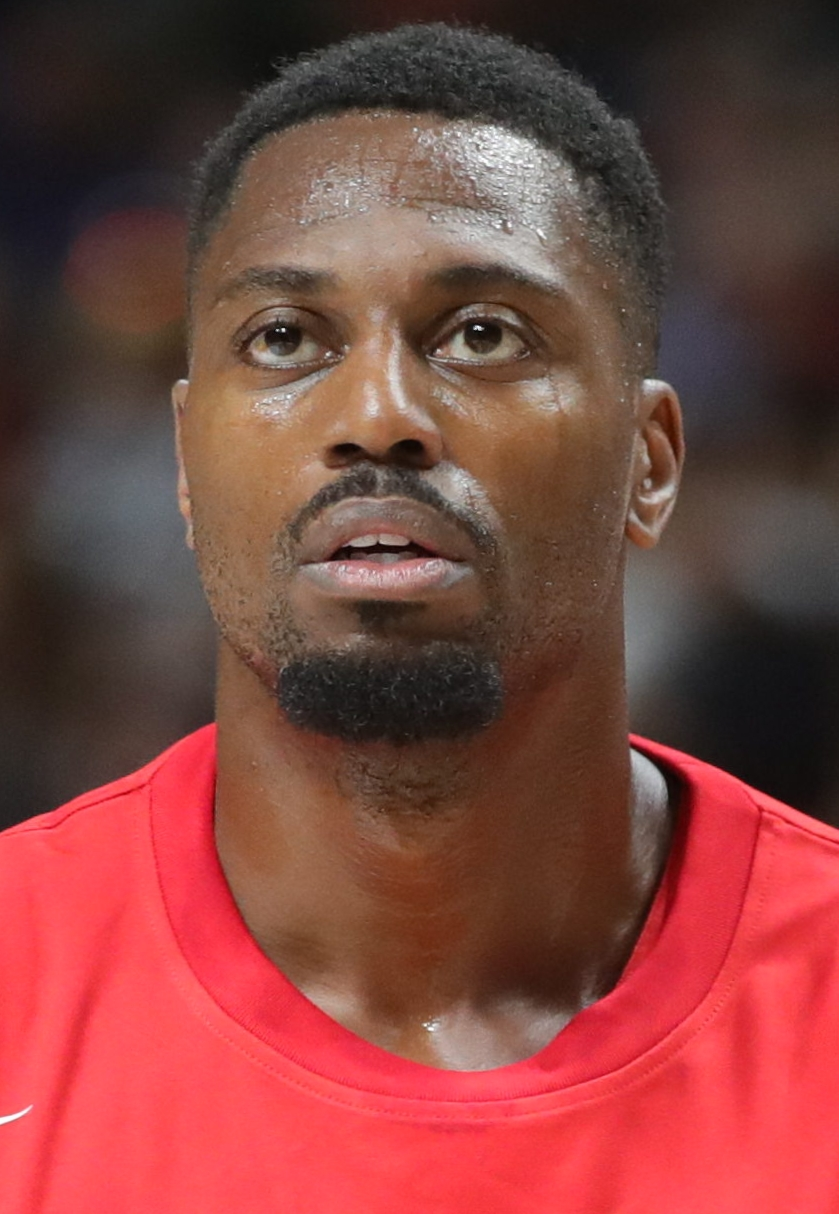
- Ejim playing for Canada in 2023

No. 3 – Força Lleida
- Position: Small forward / power forward
- League: Liga ACB

Personal information
- Born: March 4, 1991 (age 35) Toronto, Ontario, Canada
- Listed height: 6 ft 7 in (2.01 m)
- Listed weight: 220 lb (100 kg)

Career information
- High school: St. Mary's Ryken (Leonardtown, Maryland); Brewster Academy (Wolfeboro, New Hampshire)
- College: Iowa State (2010–2014)
- NBA draft: 2014: undrafted
- Playing career: 2014–present

Career history
- 2014–2015: Virtus Roma
- 2015–2016: Erie BayHawks
- 2016–2017: Reyer Venezia
- 2017–2019: UNICS
- 2019–2020: Unicaja
- 2020–2021: Budućnost
- 2021–2022: Cedevita Olimpija
- 2022–2025: Unicaja
- 2025–present: Força Lleida

Career highlights
- FIBA Intercontinental Cup champion (2024); 2× FIBA Champions League champion (2024, 2025); All-FIBA Champions League First Team (2017); Italian League champion (2017); Italian League Finals MVP (2017); 2× Copa del Rey winner (2023, 2025); Spanish Supercup winner (2024); Slovenian League champion (2022); Slovenian Cup winner (2022); Montenegrin League champion (2021); Montenegrin Cup winner (2021); Second-team All-American – AP, USBWA (2014); Big 12 Player of the Year (2014); First-team All-Big 12 (2014); Third-team All-Big 12 (2013); First-team Academic All-American (2014)
- Stats at Basketball Reference
Medals
Men's basketball
Representing Canada
FIBA World Cup
Bronze medal – third place	2023 Philippines–Japan–Indonesia
FIBA AmeriCup
Bronze medal – third place	2015 Mexico City
Pan American Games
Silver medal – second place	2015 Toronto	Team

Melvin Obinna Ejim (born March 4, 1991) is a Nigerian-Canadian professional basketball player for Força Lleida of the Liga ACB. He played college basketball for the Iowa State Cyclones before playing professionally in Italy, Russia and Spain, as well as the NBA G League.

== Early life ==
Ejim was born in Toronto, Ontario, to Nigerian parents. He started playing basketball in grade 7. Playing for a team in the Amateur Athletic Union after his first year of high school in Canada, Ejim began garnering interest from high school coaches at boarding schools in the United States.

== High school career ==
Ejim attended St. Mary's Ryken High School in Leonardtown, Maryland, where he made the 2007 Provincial team before transferring to Brewster Academy in New Hampshire. In 2008–09, he averaged 12.3 points and 4.6 rebounds per game for Brewster. In his final year in 2009–10, he averaged 13.1 points, 7.5 rebounds, 3.0 steals and 2.5 assists per game, leading Brewster to a 34–4 record and a National Prep School championship.

== College career ==
Ejim started 30 games out of 32 in his freshman campaign for Iowa State, averaging 10.3 points and 6.7 rebounds per game, shooting 48.6 percent from the field (121–249 FG) and tallied 39 steals, second-best total on the team. He became one of just 13 Iowa State freshmen in school history to average double figures in scoring, and his 214 rebounds was the third-best rookie total in school history.

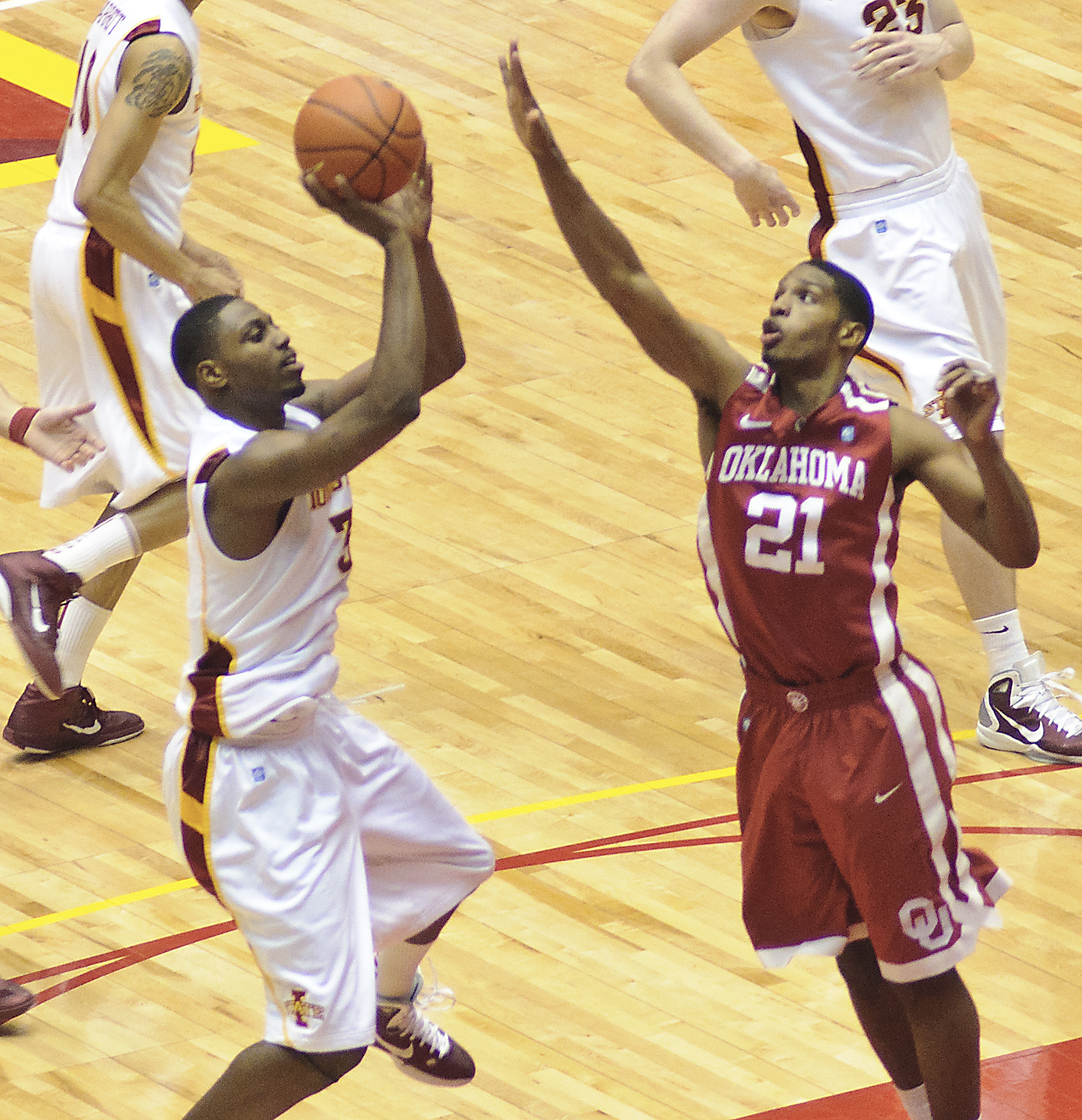
Ejim (with the ball) in January 2011

One of Iowa State's top post players, Ejim started 29 games out of 34 in 2011–12, averaging 9.3 points and 6.6 rebounds per game. He earned Big 12 Honorable Mention accolades and was a first team Academic All-Big 12 selection.

One of the best forwards in the Big 12 in 2012–13, Ejim earned All-Big 12 third team honors and was a NABC All-District 8 second team selection; he was also honored as the inaugural Big 12 Scholar Athlete of the Year Award winner and was a Capital One Academic All-District 6 selection. He became the first Cyclone to lead the Big 12 in rebounding (9.3 rpg) since Jackson Vroman (2004) and was just the third player in Big 12 history to lead the league in rebounding at 6'6" or shorter (Terry Black, Baylor; P. J. Tucker, Texas).

As a senior in 2013–14, Ejim had one of the best seasons in school history, earning Big 12 Player of the Year honors (coaches & AP) and All-America honors from five organizations. He was a finalist for the Oscar Robertson Trophy, became the fifth Academic All-American in school history, earned Capital One first team Academic All-America honors and was named the Big 12 Scholar Athlete of the Year for the second time. He became just the fourth player in league history to record 1,500 points and 1,000 rebounds in a career, finishing his career with the most wins of any Cyclone men's basketball player at 88 wins. He also finished 12th in scoring (1,643), second in rebounding (1,051), tied for 10th in steals (146) and 15th in blocks (59); he also broke the school record for games played (135) and games started (126).

On February 8, 2014, Ejim scored a Big 12-record 48 points against the TCU Horned Frogs in the Hilton Coliseum, surpassing Michael Beasley and Denis Clemente who had 44 points in 2008 and 2009 respectively.

=== College statistics ===
Year	Team	GP	GS	MPG	FG%	3P%	FT%	RPG	APG	SPG	BPG	PPG
2010–11	Iowa State	32	30	27.8	.486	.232	.695	6.7	1.2	1.2	.2	10.3
2011–12	Iowa State	34	29	23.7	.489	.220	.762	6.6	1.0	1.0	.3	9.3
2012–13	Iowa State	35	34	27.6	.504	.348	.697	9.3	1.5	1.0	.5	11.3
2013–14	Iowa State	34	33	32.1	.505	.346	.761	8.4	1.8	1.2	.7	17.8

== Professional career ==
After going undrafted in the 2014 NBA draft, Ejim played for the San Antonio Spurs during the Las Vegas Summer League. He then moved to Italy for the 2014–15 season, signing with Virtus Roma. In 29 league games for Virtus, he averaged 7.7 points and 6.3 rebounds per game. He also averaged 8.1 points and 4.3 rebounds in 18 EuroCup games.

After initially signing with German team Medi Bayreuth for the 2015–16 season, an impressive stint with the Orlando Magic during the 2015 NBA Summer League led to a training camp contract. He was waived by the Magic on October 21 after appearing in four preseason games, and subsequently joined the Erie BayHawks of the NBA Development League. He was waived by Erie on March 16, 2016. In 39 games, he averaged 14.6 points, 7.7 rebounds, 3.1 assists and 1.6 steals per game. Days later, he signed with Italian team Reyer Venezia Mestre for the rest of the season. In 16 games for Reyer Venezia, he averaged 9.3 points, 6.0 rebounds and 1.1 steals per game.

On June 17, 2016, Ejim re-signed with Reyer Venezia Mestre for the 2016–17 season. In June 2017, he helped Reyer Venezia win the Italian League championship while earning the Finals MVP. In 46 league games, he averaged 10.1 points, 5.5 rebounds, 1.7 assists and 1.3 steals per game. He also averaged 10.8 points, 6.0 rebounds, 1.5 assists and 1.4 steals in 22 BCL games.

On July 12, 2017, Ejim signed with Russian club UNICS for the 2017–18 season. In 30 league games, he averaged 9.4 points, 5.2 rebounds and 1.8 assists per game. He also averaged 9.2 points, 5.1 rebounds, 1.2 assists and 1.2 steals in 19 EuroCup games.

In June 2018, Ejim re-signed with UNICS for the 2018–19 season. In 23 league games, he averaged 8.5 points, 5.6 rebounds and 1.5 assists per game. He also averaged 7.2 points, 3.7 rebounds and 1.1 assists in 14 EuroCup games.

On July 25, 2019, Ejim signed a 1+1 deal with Spanish club Unicaja. In 17 league games during the 2019–20 season, he averaged 5.9 points and 2.9 rebounds per game. He also averaged 7.7 points, 3.9 rebounds, 1.8 assists and 1.2 steals in 10 EuroCup games.

On June 27, 2020, Ejim signed with Montenegrin club KK Budućnost.

On July 11, 2021, Ejim signed with Slovenian club KK Cedevita Olimpija.

On July 23, 2022, Ejim signed with Unicaja of the Liga ACB. He signed a contract extension in April 2023. With Unicaja in 2024–25, he averaged 5.1 points in 32 games.

On July 11, 2025, Ejim signed a two-year deal with Força Lleida.

== National team career ==
In June 2012, Ejim played for the Nigerian national team on their tour of China. In July 2013, he played for the Canadian national team at the World University Games, where he averaged eight points and four rebounds per game. In July 2015, he was named on the Canadian national team roster for the Pan American Games. He also played at the Tuto Marchand Cup and FIBA Americas Championship in 2015. In 2016, he represented Canada at the FIBA World Olympic Qualifying Tournament.

On May 24, 2022, Ejim agreed to a three-year commitment to play with the Canadian senior men's national team. He was named to Canada's roster for the 2024 Summer Olympics in Paris.

== Personal life ==
Ejim is the son of Elizabeth Omoghan. His brothers Ryan, Kenny and Deon as well as his sister Yvonne all played basketball professionally. He was a member of the Phi Kappa Phi academic honours society.
