= MarQuez Haynes =

American-Georgian basketball player (born 1986)

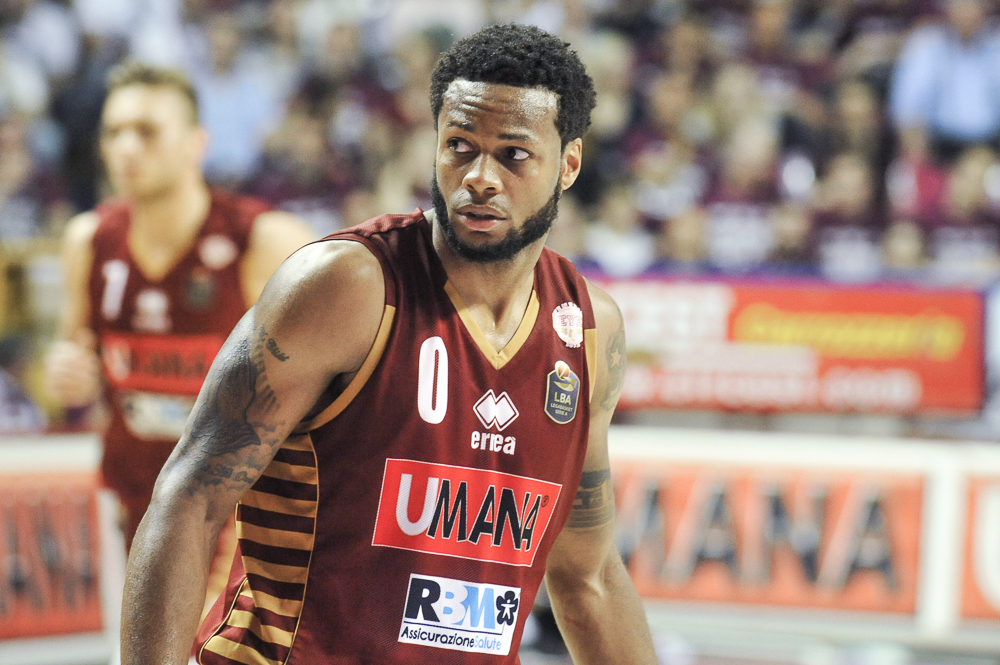
- Haynes with Reyer Venezia in 2017

Personal information
- Born: December 19, 1986 (age 39) Irving, Texas, U.S.
- Listed height: 6 ft 2 in (1.88 m)
- Listed weight: 185 lb (84 kg)

Career information
- High school: Irving (Irving, Texas)
- College: Boston College (2005–2007); Texas–Arlington (2008–2010)
- NBA draft: 2010: undrafted
- Playing career: 2010–present
- Position: Point guard / shooting guard
- Number: 24, 5, 8, 0, 00

Career history
- 2010–2011: Élan Chalon
- 2011–2012: Gran Canaria
- 2012–2013: Artland Dragons
- 2013: Olimpia Milano
- 2014: Montepaschi Siena
- 2014–2015: Maccabi Tel Aviv
- 2015–2016: Dinamo Sassari
- 2016: Panathinaikos
- 2016–2019: Reyer Venezia
- 2020: Paris Basketball

Career highlights
- FIBA Europe Cup champion (2018); Italian League champion (2017, 2019); French Cup winner (2011); Israeli Cup winner (2015); Greek Cup winner (2016); Southland Player of the Year (2010)

Keith MarQuez Haynes (born December 19, 1986) is an American-Georgian former professional basketball player. Haynes is a naturalized citizen of Georgia, and he played with the senior men's Georgian national team at EuroBasket 2011.

== College career ==
A native of Irving, Texas, Haynes played college basketball at Boston College, with the Boston College Eagles (2005–2007), and at Texas–Arlington, with the Texas–Arlington Mavericks (2008–2010).

== Professional career ==
After going undrafted in the 2010 NBA draft, Haynes decided to pursue a professional basketball career in Europe, signing with Élan Chalon of the French Pro A League. He later played with the Spanish ACB League club Gran Canaria (2011–12), the German League club Artland Dragons (2012–13), and then signed with the Italian League club Olimpia Milano. He parted ways with Milano on December 29, 2013. He then signed with the Italian League club Montepaschi Siena for the rest of the season. In July 2014, he signed a two-year deal with the Israeli Super League club Maccabi Tel Aviv. On July 6, 2015, he left Maccabi and returned to Italy where he signed with Dinamo Sassari. On January 29, 2016, he was bought out of Sassari by Panathinaikos, for an estimated price of $100k. On July 5, 2016, he signed with Italian club Umana Reyer Venezia. In his second season with Reyer, he won the European fourth-tier FIBA Europe Cup championship.

== Career statistics ==
Legend
GP	Games played	GS	Games started	MPG	Minutes per game
FG%	Field-goal percentage	3P%	3-point field-goal percentage	FT%	Free-throw percentage
RPG	Rebounds per game	APG	Assists per game	SPG	Steals per game
BPG	Blocks per game	PPG	Points per game	PIR	Performance index rating
**Bold**	Career high

=== EuroLeague ===
Year	Team	GP	GS	MPG	FG%	3P%	FT%	RPG	APG	SPG	BPG	PPG	PIR
2013–14	Milano	10	0	13.5	.250	.273	**1.000**	.9	.4	.2	.2	3.0	-.1
2014–15	Maccabi Tel Aviv	**25**	5	17.5	.383	.301	.571	**1.5**	1.2	**.4**	.1	4.6	**3.1**
2015–16	Dinamo Sassari	10	**10**	**29.4**	**.408**	**.417**	.833	1.4	**3.2**	**.4**	**.5**	**13.0**	**10.3**
Career		45	15	20.1	.375	.342	.721	1.3	1.6	.3	.3	6.1	4.4

== Georgian national team ==
Haynes represented the senior men's Georgian national basketball team at EuroBasket 2011, where he averaged 8 points per game, 1.6 rebounds per game, 1.2 assists per game, and 0.9 blocks per game.
