= Hrvoje Perić =

Croatian basketball player

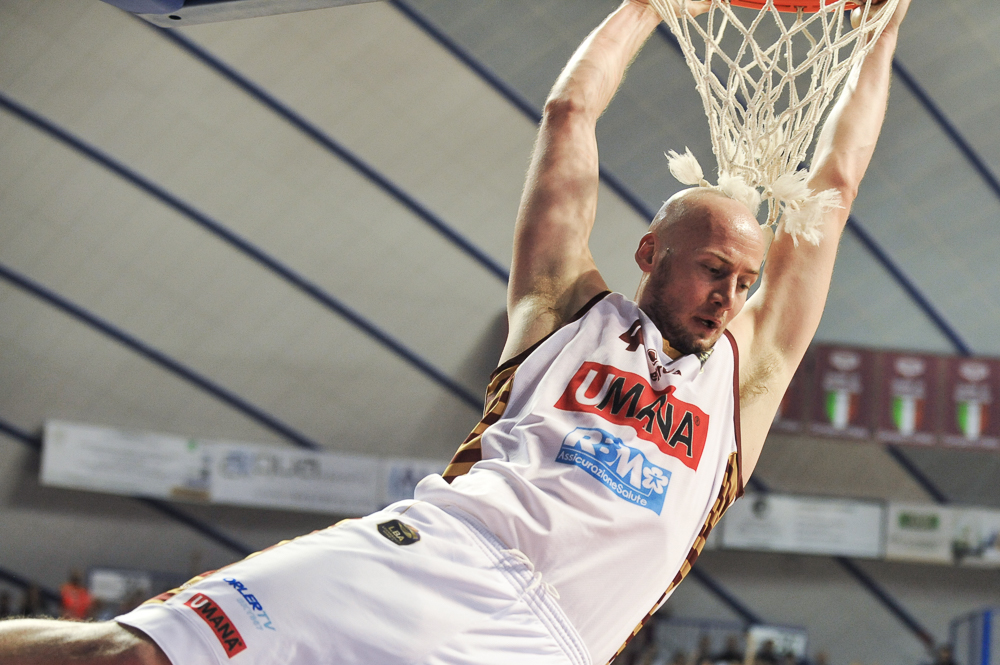
- Perić with Reyer Venezia in 2017

Personal information
- Born: October 25, 1985 (age 41) Dubrovnik, Croatia
- Listed height: 2.01 m (6 ft 7 in)
- Listed weight: 102 kg (225 lb)

Career information
- NBA draft: 2007: undrafted
- Playing career: 2000–2021
- Position: Power forward / small forward

Career history
- 2000–2001: Dubrovnik
- 2001–2002: Solin
- 2002–2008: Split
- 2008–2010: Zadar
- 2011–2012: Unicaja Malaga
- 2010–2011: →Benetton Treviso
- 2012: Zagreb
- 2012–2013: Vanoli Cremona
- 2013–2018: Reyer Venezia
- 2018–2020: Alma Trieste
- 2020–2021: Top Secret Ferrara
- 2021: Allianz Trieste
- 2021: Benedetto XIV Cento

Career highlights
- FIBA Europe Cup champion (2018); LBA champion (2017); LBA All-Star (2015)

Hrvoje Perić (born October 25, 1985) is a Croatian former professional basketball player. Standing at 2.01 m, he played at the power forward position.

== Professional career ==
=== Croatia ===
After progressing through the youth ranks of home town club KK Dubrovnik, he debuted with the first team in the Croatian second division (A-2) in 2000–01.

The next year he moved to another A-2 club, KK Solin (in Croatian), moving the same season to KK Split, a side that was playing in both the Croatian A-1 Liga and the stronger regional competition the Adriatic League. Split went on to win the domestic league in 2002-03 but the 17-year-old Perić would only play one game, with three more in the regional league.

The following season he played more, both in the Adriatic League and the Europe-wide second tier ULEB Cup but was not part of the squad that won the Krešimir Ćosić Cup.

2004-05 proved to be his breakthrough season, he accrued game time across all competitions and won plaudits, including a selection to the Croatian League All Star Game, making the Eurobasket.com All-Newcomers Team.

After establishing himself as a starter for Split in the A-1, the only competition they played in, he declared early for the 2006 NBA draft though he later pulled out when it appeared he would go undrafted. After a solid but unspectacular 2006–07 season he went undrafted in 2007.

Following a tumultuous period with Split during which he was suspended, Perić left Split for good in 2008 signing a reported 3-year deal with fellow Croatian club KK Zadar.

With the incumbent Croatian League champions he encountered a higher level of play, with two consecutive finals in the domestic and two seasons in EuroCup, including a quarterfinal in 2008–09, however Zadar lost on all these occasions. Despite being unable to win silverware, Perić performed well on all stages, earning his third A-1 All Star Game selection and plaudits from Eurobasket.com for the same league (Forward of the Year, MIP, 1st team).

=== Abroad ===
Following these good performances in a team that had more exposure, the Croatian was spotted by Spanish team Unicaja Malaga with an eye of signing him. He was keen to join them, Zadar were willing to sell him to generate income and the signing seemed to be a formality, however internal divisions at the Andalusian club hijacked the move, it was first cancelled before finally going through for €200,000.

Perić signed a two-year contract with an option for a third year but his late arrival meant he joined an already assembled squad. Unicaja then loaned him for the year to Italian team Benetton Treviso, against whom he had had a career best performance in the 2009 Eurocup (26 points, 9 rebounds, 5 steals for a PIR of 40).

Under countryman Jasmin Repeša, his previous national team coach, Perić's Benetton reached the semifinals of both the Eurocup and the League.

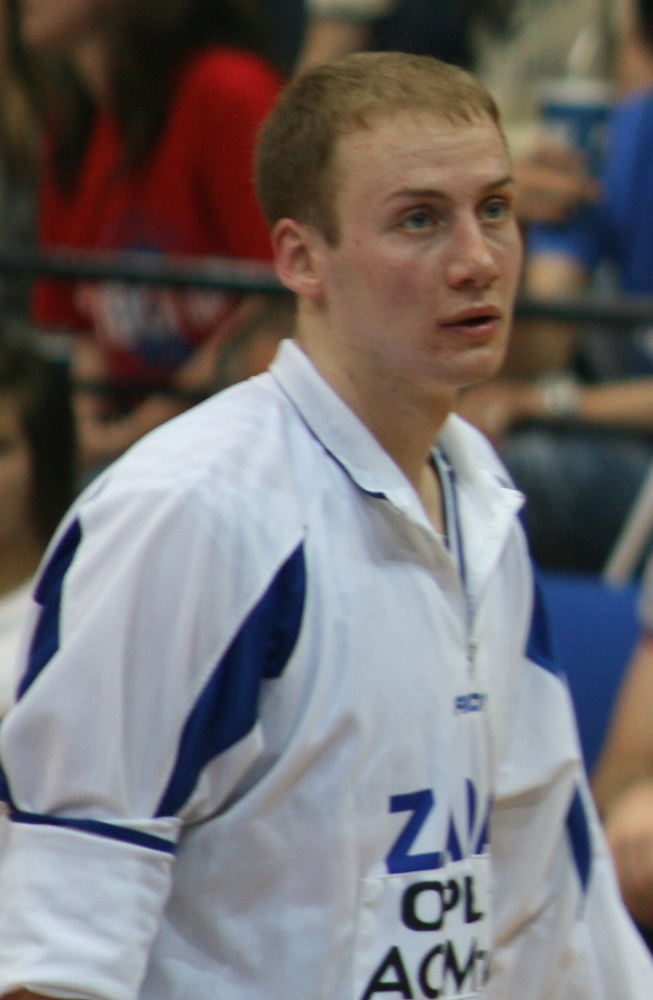
Perić with Zadar in 2010

Despite these performances he wasn't in Malaga's plans for 2011–12 after a coach change, amidst talk of transferring him he convinced the coach with his graft and was added to the squad for good later on. This allowed him to discover the best international and domestic club competitions in Europe in respectively the EuroLeague and the Liga ACB. He held his own in both, earning game time and displaying some good performances against top sides, Unicaja's season was less successful as they were thoroughly outclassed in the Euroleague Top 16 and did not make the playoffs in the league.

The collective failure resulted in a squad makeover and Perić was a victim, with the option on the third year of his contract not being taken, he then returned to Croatia to play for KK Zagreb.

The Dalmatian only played a handful of games for Zagreb, returning to Italy in October 2012 to sign with Vanoli Cremona. His return to Serie A proved fruitful as he was called to play a larger role in Cremona, regularly starting and helping his team comfortably avoid relegation by providing good figures (14.3 points and 6 rebounds per game).

=== Reyer Venezia Mestre ===
Moving upwards in his career, he joined stronger club Reyer Venezia Mestre, who had finished in the playoff places the preceding year, in July 2013.

He proceeded to have a good season in Venice, with a big impact off the bench (third best scorer, 4.7 rebounds on average) though the team did not reach the playoffs. A squad overhaul followed but, unlike at Malaga, Perić was not a casualty, in fact he was the only incumbent player to be offered a new contract by the team.

He repaid that trust in full with a career best season at 29, he was the only Reyer player called up to the All Star Game in December after an impressive first half of the season where other teams struggled to contain him. He would finish the regular season with impressive all around stats: 14.7 points on 58.3 field goal percentage, 5.9 rebounds, 2.3 assists in 27 minutes per game, that would see him ranked in the league top 10 in points, valuation and FG%, earning him plaudits including being voted third best player of Serie A in the official and Gazzetta rankings, the latter also choosing him as their most improved player.

On 2 May 2018, he won the FIBA Europe Cup with Reyer.

In May 2018, Perić left Reyer Venezia after five seasons in LBA with one scudetto and one FIBA Europe Cup won.

=== Pallacanestro Trieste and later ===
On May 12, 2018, Perić went to Pallacanestro Trieste. He played for a short period of half a year for Kleb Basket Ferrara in the Serie A2, second tier Italian national league for the 2020–21 season. But, at the beginning of 2021, on February 9, his return was announced during the 2021 Final Eight press conference. Perić was hired for 1 month, with an option for the following month, to replace the injured Andrejs Gražulis.

Perić started the 2020–21 season in Top Secret Ferrara of the Serie A2. He continued the season returning to Pallacanestro Trieste of the Serie A. After playing only two games in Trieste, he moved for the second time in the same season to Benedetto XIV Cento of the Serie A2.

== International career ==
Perić played for the Under 19 squad of Croatia in the 2003 FIBA Under-19 World Championship where he wasn't a mayor player for the team. He would play in the qualification for the 2004 FIBA Europe Under-20 Championship but would not make the final squad.

He later joined the senior Croatian national team, playing in FIBA EuroBasket 2007 qualification but again missing the tournament. This frustrating situation would repeat itself throughout his international career, despite making the preliminary squads of the 2010 FIBA World Championship and EuroBasket 2013 he hasn't played in a tournament for Croatia as of 2015.

== Career statistics ==
=== Euroleague ===
Legend
GP	Games played	GS	Games started	MPG	Minutes per game
FG%	Field-goal percentage	3P%	3-point field-goal percentage	FT%	Free-throw percentage
RPG	Rebounds per game	APG	Assists per game	SPG	Steals per game
BPG	Blocks per game	PPG	Points per game	PIR	Performance index rating
**Bold**	Career high

Year	Team	GP	GS	MPG	FG%	3P%	FT%	RPG	APG	SPG	BPG	PPG	PIR
2011–12	Unicaja Malaga	15	5	20.54	60.0	7.1	71.0	2.6	1.6	0.5	0.4	7.7	9.3
Career		15	5	20.54	60.0	7.1	71.0	2.6	1.6	0.5	0.4	7.7	9.3

=== Eurocup ===
Year	Team	GP	GS	MPG	FG%	3P%	FT%	RPG	APG	SPG	BPG	PPG	PIR
2003–04	Split Croatia Insurance	10	4	20.06	50.0	33.3	61.1	2.1	0.2	0.9	0.3	8.0	5.5
2008–09	KK Zadar	13	**6**	**26.09**	**53.2**	**42.1**	**61.4**	'3.3'	**1.8**	**1.5**	0.3	**13.0**	**13.8**
2009–10	KK Zadar	6	4	22.22	45.9	33.3	55.0	3.8	1.3	0.5	**1.0**	8.0	8.0
2010–11	Benetton Bwin	**14**	4	19.40	45.9	18.2	61.0	**4.0**	1.2	0.8	0.1	6.3	5.9
Career		43	18	21.94	48.8	31.7	71.0	3.3	1.1	0.9	0.4	8.8	8.3

Source.

== Player profile ==
Aged 19, Perić was seen as an athletic and dynamic player with above average footwork and ball-handling skills but whose attitude and confidence problems could hamper his development.

In attack he likes to go at his opponent from the dribble, using his good footwork and technical skills. Though he's most effective in the paint, he has improved his three-pointer - one of his weaknesses - and is also a threat from afar. Possessing good vision and passing skills, he is able to find teammates.

Although he is a more offensive player he also is aggressive and concentrated in defense. He uses his physical attributes, above all his large wingspan, to dominate under the boards with rebounds (his forte) and blocks.
