= Aaron Craft =

American basketball player (born 1991)

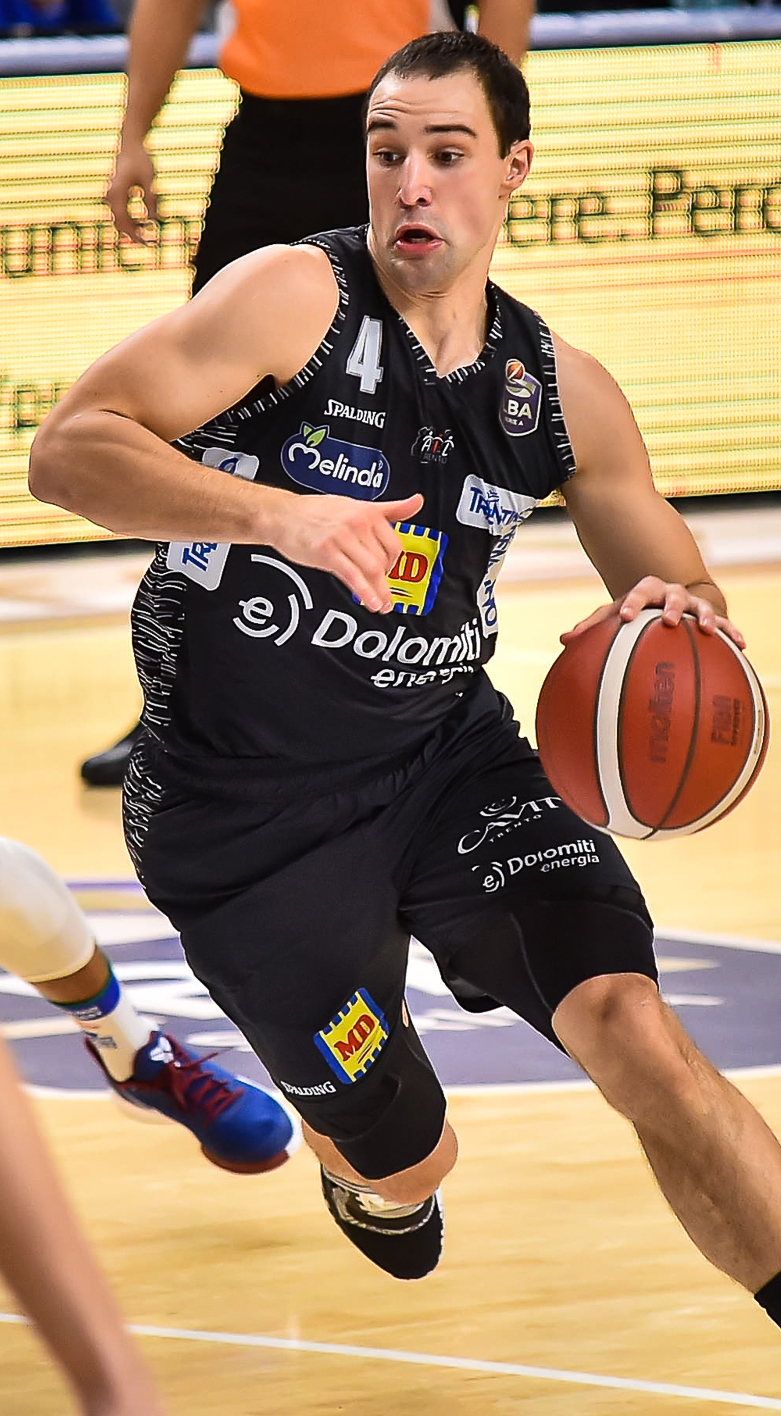
- Craft in 2020

Personal information
- Born: February 12, 1991 (age 35) Findlay, Ohio, U.S.
- Listed height: 6 ft 2 in (1.88 m)
- Listed weight: 187 lb (85 kg)

Career information
- High school: Liberty-Benton (Findlay, Ohio)
- College: Ohio State (2010–2014)
- NBA draft: 2014: undrafted
- Playing career: 2014–2020
- Position: Point guard
- Number: 14, 4

Career history
- 2014–2015: Santa Cruz Warriors
- 2015: Szolnoki Olaj
- 2016: Santa Cruz Warriors
- 2016–2017: Aquila Basket Trento
- 2017–2018: AS Monaco
- 2018: Budućnost VOLI
- 2018–2020: Aquila Basket Trento

Career highlights
- French League Cup winner (2018); LNB Pro A Best Defender (2018); Lega Serie A Defensive Player of the Year (2019); 2× LBA steals leader (2017, 2019); NBA D-League champion (2015); NBA D-League Defensive Player of the Year (2015); 2× NBA D-League All-Defensive First Team (2015, 2016); NABC Defensive Player of the Year (2014); Second-team All-Big Ten (2013); Third-team All-Big Ten (2014); Big Ten tournament MOP (2013); 2× Academic All-American of the Year (2013, 2014); 2× Big Ten Defensive Player of the Year (2012, 2014); 4× Big Ten All-Defensive Team (2011–2014); Big Ten All-Freshman Team (2011); Big Ten Sixth Man of the Year (2011)
- Stats at Basketball Reference

Aaron Vincent Craft (born February 12, 1991) is an American former professional basketball player. He played college basketball for Ohio State University.

== High school career ==
Craft attended Liberty-Benton High School near Findlay, Ohio, and graduated valedictorian of his class. He was the Ohio Division III player of the year his senior year (2009–10 season). He averaged 26 points, 7 assists and 8 rebounds as a senior with 70 steals (3.2 per game). His freshman year he was the starting point guard for their state runner-up team. In his four years, his teams went 88–5.

In football, he was a two-time All-Ohio selection and was the Ohio Division V player of the year (2008 season). During his junior year his team finished state runner-up in Division V football. In three years of football Craft accumulated over 11,000 yards of total offenses, passing for 6,800 yards and rushing for 4,700 yards (both school records). He had a career 73.7% passing percentage. He was the starting quarterback for three years opting out of football his senior year to focus on basketball. In those three years his teams had a 38–4 record.

During Craft's high school years he played on the All-Ohio Red AAU basketball team, with future Ohio State teammates Jared Sullinger and J.D. Weatherspoon, winning three consecutive National Championships. They were the only team to win the AAU Nationals at three different age levels.

While Craft was growing up, his father, John Craft, stressed the importance of defense and how it was more important to be a good defensive player than offensive player. When Craft was in 2nd and 3rd grade, his father, who coached the junior high basketball team, let him join defensive drills during the team practice. One of such drills that Craft remembers as grueling was getting into a defensive stance, and slide back and forth across the foul lane while holding onto bricks.

== College career ==
As a freshman, Craft was the lead point guard for Ohio State. He recorded the fifth highest minutes played on the team. He led his team in assists (177) and steals (73). Craft set a school record 15 assists in a game during an NCAA tournament game against George Mason.

As a sophomore, Craft was highly decorated and even featured in Time. He was the catalyst of the 31–8 Ohio State men's basketball team. Craft improved his offensive output as a sophomore and expanded his offensive role. He was an efficient scorer, shooting 50% from the field. But his long-range game could improve, only shooting 35.9%. Craft is not known for his shooting but more for his passing and low number of turnovers, with a 2.15 assist to turnover ratio.

During his sophomore season Craft averaged 8.8 PPG, 3.2 RPG, 4.6 APG, and 2.5 SPG.

In his junior year at Ohio State, Craft passed former Buckeye guard Jay Burson for most steals in school history with 205. In the third round of the 2013 NCAA tournament against Iowa State, he hit a game-winning three with 0.5 seconds left to send the Buckeyes to the Sweet 16.

Craft is the fourth player in Big Ten history to be a three-time first team Academic All-America selection and the third athlete in Division I history to repeat as Division I Men's Basketball Academic All-America Team Member of the Year. Craft graduated from Ohio State with a Bachelor of Science degree in nutrition sciences.

On June 22, 2020, the Big Ten Network named Craft to the "All-Decade Basketball Team", placing him on their Third Team. Craft was one of 16 players honored by the Network for accomplishments between 2010 and 2019. Of the honor, Craft told BTN's Mike Hall, "It doesn't feel real. I really, truly believed the Big Ten was the best conference in the country when I was in school. That's because we had great coaches and we had really great players. To be able to be mentioned and honored with the other guys that are on these teams is a tremendous blessing for me and one that I appreciate and cherish."

=== College statistics ===
| Year | Team | GP | GS | MPG | FG% | 3P% | FT% | RPG | APG | SPG | BPG | PPG |
|---|---|---|---|---|---|---|---|---|---|---|---|---|
| 2010-11 | Ohio State | 37 | 1 | 29.6 | .461 | .377 | .727 | 2.9 | 4.8 | 2.0 | .1 | 6.9 |
| 2011-12 | Ohio State | 39 | 39 | 32.2 | .500 | .359 | .713 | 3.2 | 4.6 | 2.5 | .2 | 8.8 |
| 2012-13 | Ohio State | 37 | 37 | 34.1 | .417 | .300 | .768 | 3.6 | 4.6 | 2.1 | .2 | 10.0 |
| 2013-14 | Ohio State | 35 | 35 | 34.4 | .473 | .302 | .741 | 3.6 | 4.7 | 2.5 | .1 | 9.8 |

== Professional career ==
=== Santa Cruz Warriors (2014–2015) ===
After going undrafted in the 2014 NBA draft, Craft participated in the 2014 NBA Summer League, joining the Philadelphia 76ers for the Orlando session and the Golden State Warriors for the Las Vegas session. On September 2, 2014, he signed with the Warriors. However, he was later waived by the Warriors on October 24, 2014. On November 3, 2014, he was acquired by the Santa Cruz Warriors as an affiliate player. On November 14, he made his professional debut in a 122–95 win over the Los Angeles D-Fenders, recording five points, four rebounds, eight assists and two steals in 32 minutes. On April 10, 2015, he was named the 2015 D-League Defensive Player of the Year and on April 26, 2015, he won the D-League championship with the Warriors.

=== Szolnoki Olaj (2015) ===
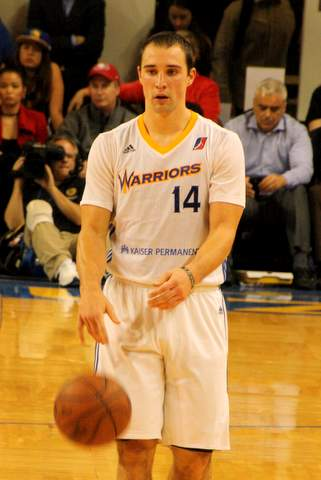
Craft with Santa Cruz Warriors in 2016

In July 2015, Craft re-joined the Golden State Warriors for the 2015 NBA Summer League, where he broke the Warriors' Las Vegas assists record for a single summer. Craft had 27 assists in the Summer League, breaking the old mark of 23, set by Brian Chase in 2010.

On August 6, 2015, Craft signed with Szolnoki Olaj KK of the Nemzeti Bajnokság I/A in Hungary. In December 2015, he left Szolnoki after appearing in 12 league games and 10 Eurocup games.

=== Return to Santa Cruz (2016) ===
On January 7, 2016, Craft was reacquired by the Santa Cruz Warriors. The next day, he made his season debut for the Warriors in a 101–89 loss to the Iowa Energy, recording eight points, two rebounds, eight assists and four steals in 37 minutes. At the season's end, he earned NBA D-League All-Defensive Team honors for the second year in a row.

=== Trento (2016–2017) ===
On July 31, 2016, Craft signed with Aquila Basket Trento of Italy for the 2016–17 season.

=== Monaco (2017–2018) ===
On July 2, 2017, Craft signed with AS Monaco.

=== Budućnost (2018) ===
On June 26, 2018, Craft signed a one-year contract with Budućnost VOLI.

=== Return to Trento (2018–2020) ===
On November 5, 2018, Craft came back to Italy and signed a deal with Aquila Basket Trento.

=== Post-professional basketball career ===
Craft retired from basketball in the summer of 2020 after appearing in that year's edition of The Basketball Tournament (TBT) as a member of Carmen's Crew, a team made up mostly of OSU basketball alumni. He briefly ended his retirement for 2021 TBT, playing again for Carmen's Crew during his last full summer off from medical school.

He enrolled in the Ohio State University College of Medicine to pursue a medical degree in August 2020. Craft matched into an otorhinolaryngology residency at Ohio State University Wexner Medical Center, and graduated medical school in 2024.

== Personal life ==
Craft is one-fourth Filipino through his paternal grandmother.

== See also ==
- List of NCAA Division I men's basketball career steals leaders
