= Most Improved Player =

In some sports, a Most Improved Player award is given to players who have improved the most over the year.

- Greek Basket League Most Improved Player
- Israeli Basketball Premier League Most Improved Player
- NBA Most Improved Player Award
- NBA G League Most Improved Player Award
- PWI Most Improved Wrestler of the Year
- WNBA Most Improved Player Award

== Other uses ==
- "Most Improved Player" (The Good Place), an episode of the American comedy television series The Good Place
