= Aquila Basket Trento =

Dolomiti Energia Trento
- Leagues: LBA; EuroCup
- Founded: 1995; 31 years ago
- History: Aquila Basket Trento (1995–present)
- Arena: PalaTrento
- Capacity: 4,360
- Location: Trento, Trentino, Italy
- Team colors: White and Black
- President: Luigi Longhi
- Team manager: Andrea Nardelli
- Head coach: Alessandro Rossi
- Team captain: Andrés Pablo Forray
- Ownership: Aquila Basket Trento 2013 S.R.L.
- Championships: 1 Serie A2; 1 LegaDue Cup; 1 Italian Cup
- Website: aquilabasket.it

Aquila Basket Trento, for sponsorship reasons also known as Dolomiti Energia Trento, is an Italian professional basketball club based in Trent, Trentino.

It was founded in 1995 as an amalgamation of two local clubs, going from the amateur divisions to the first division LBA in less than a decade.

== History ==
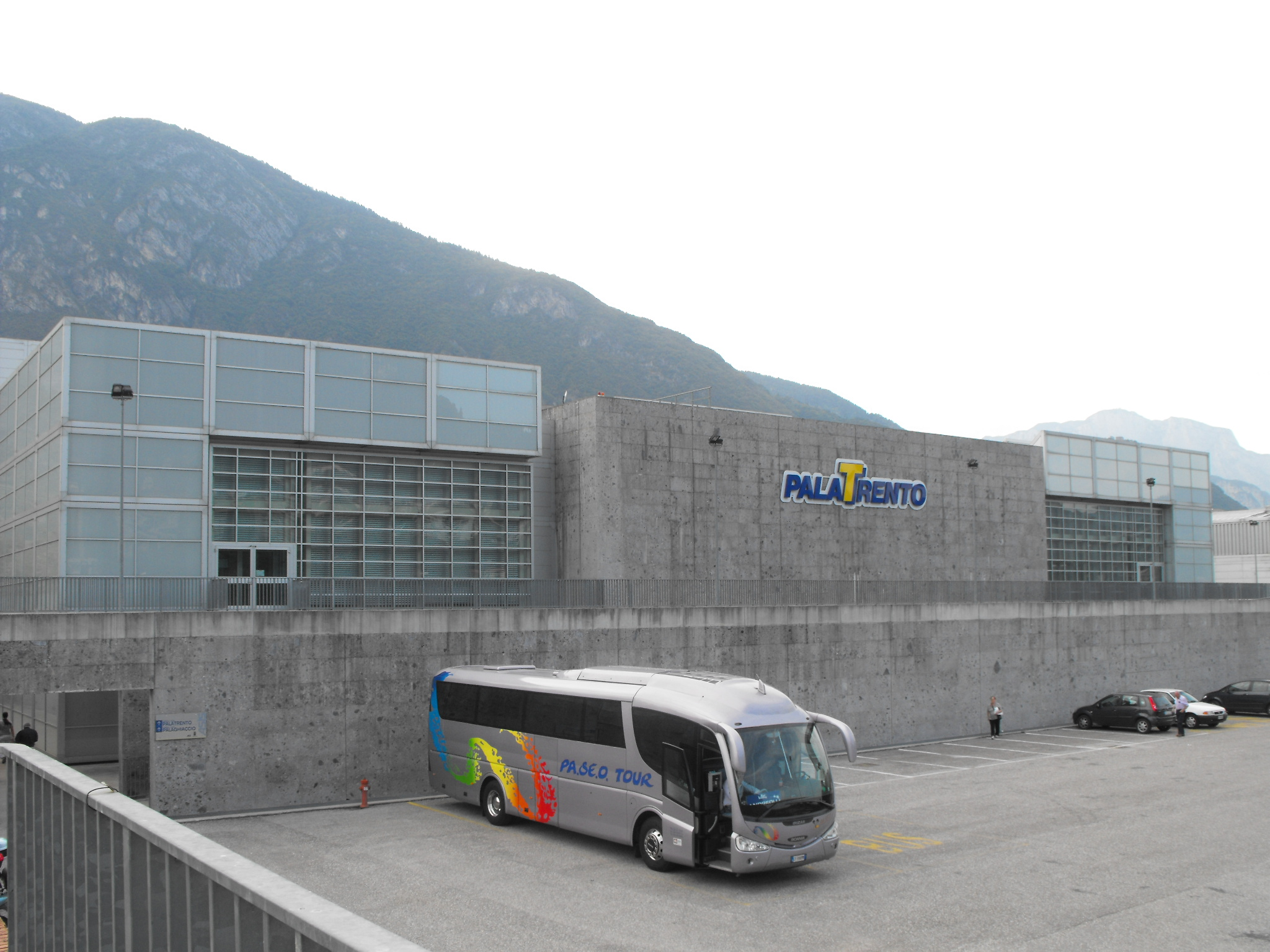
The PalaTrento, home venue of the club

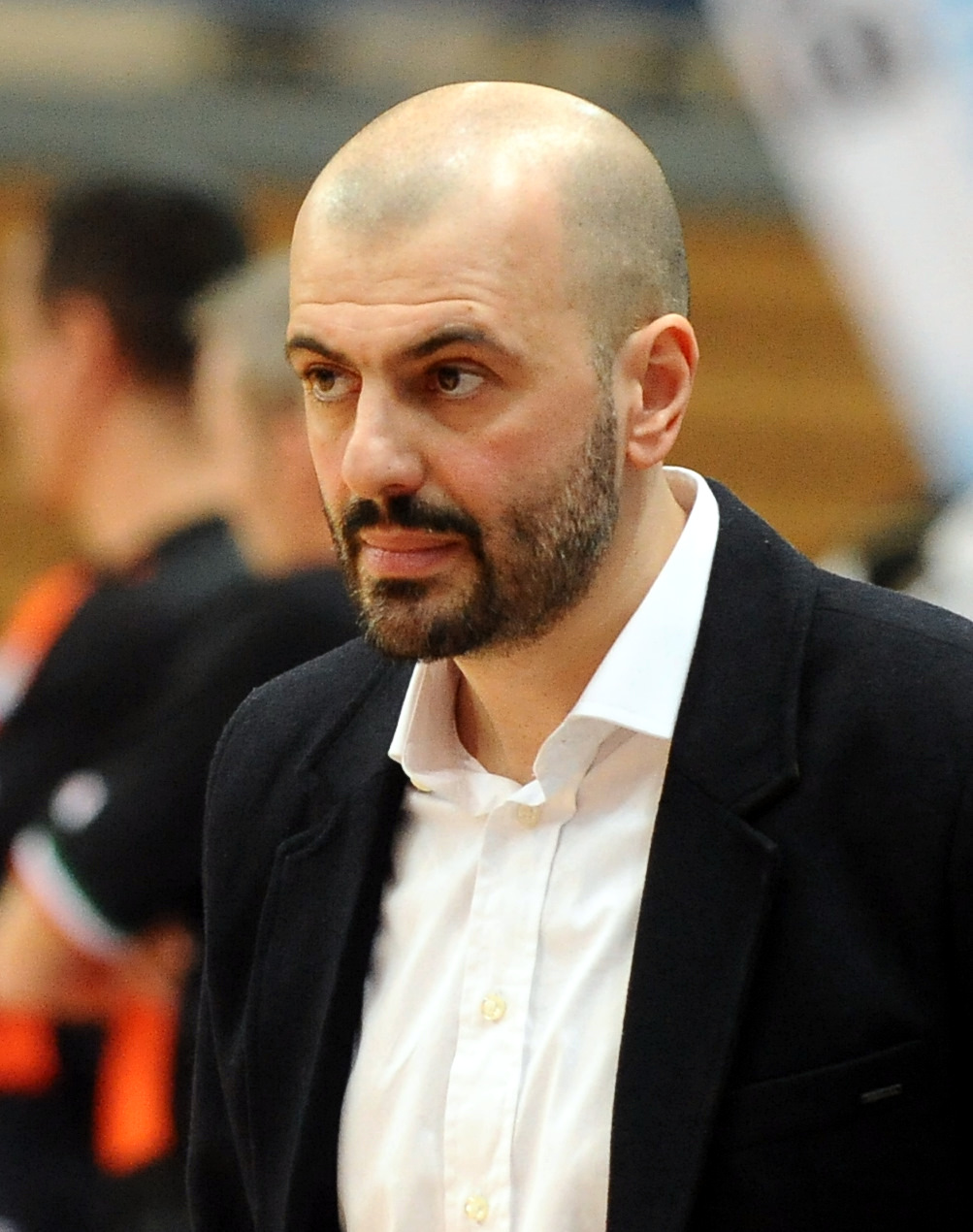
Head coach Maurizio Buscaglia led the team to the LBA and to two LBA Finals

Aquila Basket Trento was founded in 1995 from the merger of two clubs playing the seventh tier Serie D, Dolomiti Sport B.C. Trento and Pallacanestro Villazzano, under the impetus of their respective presidents; Gianni Brusinelli and Marco Angelini. In 2000, Giovanni Zobele became club president and the same season Aquila Basket was promoted to the Serie C2, later moving up to the Serie C1 in 2002.

Long serving coach Maurizio Buscaglia was nominated before the 2003–04 season, he would help the club win the C1 the next season to be promoted to the fourth Serie B2, adding the C1 Cup with a 77–68 win over Navarra Ferentino. Staying there for four years, it lost the promotion playoffs on game 5 in 2005–06, with Buscaglia leaving the following season. Trento won the 2007–08 regular season but could not obtain promotion to the Divisione Nazionale A until buying Lumezzane's sporting rights in 2009.

For the club's first season in the third division, Vincenzo Esposito – notable for his playing career - was chosen for the coaching job, leading the club to the ninth place. Buscaglia returned to Trento in 2010, guiding the side to eighth in the league, though that meant it had to play in the relegation playoffs as the league was contracting, with their subsequent loss condemning them to relegation. However, Trento - having earlier confirmed Buscaglia - was granted a wildcard by the league to stay at that level.

On 18 January 2012, Luigi Longhi replaced Zobele as president. In the course of the same 2011–12 season, Trento earned a promotion to the LegaDue after beating BLS Chieti on 27 May 2012 to win the semifinals series 3–1, they went on to win the league outright after toppling Ferentino in the final. Trento adapted quickly to the professional second division, lifting the LegaDue Cup – organised in the PalaTrento - by beating Pistoia 84–76 in the final, also reaching the promotion playoffs that same season. In 2013–14 it went one better, finishing the regular season in first place before downing Agrigento (3–0) Torino (3–2) and finally Capo d'Orlando (3–0) to earn a historic promotion to the first division Serie A.

Their first season in the elite was an unanticipated success as the promotees, led by Serie A MVP Tony Mitchell (also league top scorer), finished fourth in the regular season whilst the organisation had two other awardees at the Lega Basket Awards, with Buscaglia coach of the year and GM Salvatore Trainotti best executive (repeating the LegaDue awards they earned in 2014).

Qualifying for the title playoffs for their first season in the elite, Trento won the first game of the quarterfinal series against Dinamo Banco di Sardegna Sassari 81–70 for another record, but could not make their home advantage count as they then lost a closely contested game at the PalaTrento before being defeated in both away games to the eventual champions. That result did ensure the side would participate in a European competition for the first time ever, earning a place in the second-tier EuroCup for 2015–16. The club reached the semi-finals in the competition.

In the 2016–17 season, Trento reached the Italian League Finals for the first time in club history after beating Olimpia Milano in the semi-finals series 4–1. In the 2017 LBA Finals, Trento lost to Reyer Venezia, 2–the 2017–18 season, Trento reached the Italian League Finals for the second time in club history after beating Reyer Venezia in the semi-finals series. In the 2018 LBA Finals, Trento lost to Olimpia Milano, 2–4.

== Players ==
=== Current roster ===
Note: Flags indicate national team eligibility at FIBA-sanctioned events. Players may hold other non-FIBA nationalities not displayed.

Dolomiti Energia Trento roster
Players
Coaches

Pos.	No.	Nat.	Name	Ht.	Wt.	Age
PG	0	(United States)	Brown II, Darius	1.88 m (6 ft 2 in)	88 kg (194 lb)	27 – 28 July 1999
SF	4	(United States)	Brown Jr., Charlie	1.98 m (6 ft 6 in)	90 kg (198 lb)	29 – 2 February 1997
SF	5	(Italy)	Bertini, Alessandro	1.95 m (6 ft 5 in)	87 kg (192 lb)	23 – 26 December 2002
SG	7	(Italy) (Senegal)	Niang, Cheickh	1.95 m (6 ft 5 in)	88 kg (194 lb)	18 – 16 September 2008
SG	8	(United States)	Olivari, Quincy	1.91 m (6 ft 3 in)	91 kg (201 lb)	25 – 27 May 2001
PG	10	(Argentina)	Forray, Andrés Pablo (C)	1.87 m (6 ft 2 in)	83 kg (183 lb)	40 – 20 March 1986
SG	11	(Italy)	Cattapan, Federico	1.96 m (6 ft 5 in)	86 kg (190 lb)	18 – 27 May 2008
SF	13	(Italy)	Barra, Antonio	2.02 m (6 ft 8 in)	96 kg (212 lb)	18 – 4 June 2008
SG	14	(Latvia)	Jahovics, Markuss	1.96 m (6 ft 5 in)	86 kg (190 lb)	16 – 17 February 2010
C	15	(The Gambia)	Bayo, Mansour	2.08 m (6 ft 10 in)	98 kg (216 lb)	17 – 8 February 2009
C	21	(United States)	Mawugbe, Selom	2.08 m (6 ft 10 in)	104 kg (229 lb)	28 – 20 July 1998
PF	24	(United States)	Bigelow, Isaiah	2.01 m (6 ft 7 in)	93 kg (205 lb)	26 – 5 January 2000
F/C	26	(Cameroon)	Bayehe, Jordan	2.04 m (6 ft 8 in)	96 kg (212 lb)	27 – 16 October 1999
PF	30	(Cuba)	Medina Bouza, José Alfred	2.05 m (6 ft 9 in)	100 kg (220 lb)	19 – 1 May 2007
PG	68	(Italy)	Hassan, Patrick	1.85 m (6 ft 1 in)	82 kg (181 lb)	19 – 20 January 2007

Head coach

- (Italy) Alessandro Rossi

Assistant coach(es)

- (Italy) Davide Dusmet
- (Italy) Fabio Bongi
- (Italy) Nazareno Lombardi

Legend

- (C) Team captain
- Injured

- Roster
Updated: September 30, 2026

=== Notable players ===
Note: Flags indicate national team eligibility at FIBA-sanctioned events. Players may hold other non-FIBA nationalities not displayed.

Criteria

To appear in this section a player must have either:

- Set a club record or won an individual award while at the club
- Played at least one official international match for their national team at any time
- Played at least one official NBA match at any time.

- (Argentina) Andrés Pablo Forray
- (Italy) Diego Flaccadori
- (Italy) Luca Garri
- (Italy) Stefano Gentile
- (Italy) Saliou Niang
- (Italy) Davide Pascolo
- (United States) George King
- (United States) Devyn Marble
- (United States) Tony Mitchell
- (United States) Brandon Triche

== Season by season ==
Season	Tier	League	Pos.	Domestic cups		European competitions	
2011–12	3	DNA	1st	DNA Cup	SF		
2012–13	2	LegaDue	4th	LegaDue Cup	C		
2013–14	2	DNA Gold	1st	A2 Cup	RU		
2014–15	1	Serie A	5th	Italian Cup	QF		
2015–16	1	Serie A	8th	Italian Cup	SF	2 Eurocup	SF
2016–17	1	LBA	2nd				
2017–18	1	LBA	2nd			2 EuroCup	T16
2018–19	1	LBA	6th			2 EuroCup	RS
2019–20	1	LBA	9th			2 EuroCup	T16
2020–21	1	LBA	8th			2 EuroCup	T16
2021–22	1	LBA	13th			2 EuroCup	RS
2022–23	1	LBA	6th	Italian Basketball Cup	QF	2 EuroCup	RS
2023–24	1	LBA	7th	Italian Basketball Cup	QF	2 EuroCup	RS
2024–25	1	LBA	5th	Italian Basketball Cup	C	2 EuroCup	RS
2025–26	1	LBA				2 EuroCup	QF

== Honours ==
=== Domestic competitions ===
- Italian Cup
  - Champions: 2025
- Divisione Nazionale A Gold
  - Champions: 2014
- LegaDue Cup
  - Winners: 2013
- Divisione Nazionale A
  - Champions: 2012

== Sponsorship names ==
Throughout the years, due to sponsorship deals, it has been also known as:

- Sosi Trento: (1995–2005)
- Bitumcalor Trento: (2005–2013)
- Aquila Basket Trento: (2013–2014)
- Dolomiti Energia Trento: (2014–present)
