= Pistoia Basket 2000 =

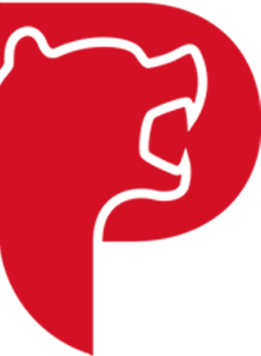
- Leagues: Serie A2
- Founded: 2000; 26 years ago
- History: Pistoia Basket 2000 (2000–present)
- Arena: PalaCarrara
- Capacity: 4,000
- Location: Pistoia, Tuscany, Italy
- Team colors: Red, white
- President: Joe David
- Head coach: Tommaso Della Rosa
- Championships: 2 Italian Serie A2; 1 Italian LNP Supercup
- Website: pistoiabasket2000.com
Home	Away

A.S. Pistoia Basket 2000, known for sponsorship reasons as Estra Pistoia, is an Italian professional basketball team based in Pistoia, Tuscany. The team currently plays in Serie A2 following its relegation from the top division.

== History ==
The city of Pistoia was formerly represented in the first division LBA by Olimpia Basket Pistoia during the 1990s. Pistoia Basket 2000 was promoted to the LBA in 2014, and is playing in that league as of the 2015–16 season.

The 2019–20 season was cancelled prematurely because of the COVID-19 pandemic. In June 2020, Pistoia asked to be repositioned to the second-tier Serie A2.

== Symbols ==
2000–2019

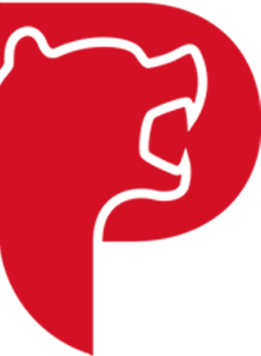
2019–present

== Players ==
=== Current roster ===
Note: Flags indicate national team eligibility at FIBA-sanctioned events. Players may hold other non-FIBA nationalities not displayed.

Oriora Pistoia roster
Players
Coaches

Pos.	No.	Nat.	Name	Ht.	Wt.	Age
F	0	(Italy)	Benetti, Gabriele	1.98 m (6 ft 6 in)	91 kg (201 lb)	31 – 30 June 1995
SF	6	(Italy)	Stoch, Federico	1.98 m (6 ft 6 in)	90 kg (198 lb)	20 – 13 June 2006
PF	8	(Italy)	Alessandrini, Nicolas	2.03 m (6 ft 8 in)	98 kg (216 lb)	25 – 8 May 2001
SF	9	(Italy)	Dellosto, Nicolò	2.00 m (6 ft 7 in)	98 kg (216 lb)	26 – 4 June 2000
G	10	(Cameroon)	Mouaha, Aristide	1.93 m (6 ft 4 in)		26 – 18 August 2000
SF	12	(Italy)	Campogrande, Luca	2.00 m (6 ft 7 in)	90 kg (198 lb)	30 – 30 April 1996
PG	15	(Italy)	Saccaggi, Lorenzo	1.88 m (6 ft 2 in)	87 kg (192 lb)	34 – 30 August 1992
C	18	(Italy)	Magro, Daniele	2.08 m (6 ft 10 in)	112 kg (247 lb)	39 – 14 April 1987
PG	22	(United States)	Johnson, Jazz	1.78 m (5 ft 10 in)	86 kg (190 lb)	30 – 26 September 1996
C	25	(Croatia)	Buva, Ivan	2.08 m (6 ft 10 in)	113 kg (249 lb)	35 – 6 May 1991
PF	41	(Italy)	Zanotti, Simone	2.08 m (6 ft 10 in)	106 kg (234 lb)	36 – 17 December 1989
G	44	(Italy)	Gallo, Filippo	1.95 m (6 ft 5 in)	82 kg (181 lb)	22 – 3 May 2004

Head coach

- (Italy) Tommaso Della Rosa

Assistant coach(es)

- (Italy) Luca Civinini
- (Italy) Lorenzo Suriano
- (Italy) Alessandro Zamparini

Legend

- (C) Team captain
- Injured

- Roster
Updated: August 1, 2026

=== Notable players ===
- Set a club record or won an individual award as a professional player.
- Played at least one official international match for his senior national team at any time.

- (Italy) Ariel Filloy
- (Italy) Davide Moretti
- (Italy) Giacomo Galanda
- (Italy) Daniele Magro
- (Italy) Guido Rosselli
- (Italy) Gregor Fučka
- (Italy) Andrea Crosariol
- (Italy) Valerio Amoroso
- (Italy) Fabio Mian
- (Czech Republic) Patrik Auda
- (France) Yakhouba Diawara
- (United Kingdom) Carl Wheatle
- (United Kingdom) Teddy Okereafor
- (Latvia) Jānis Porziņģis
- (Poland) Aleksander Czyz
- (United States) Wayne Blackshear
- (United States) Ed Daniel
- (United States) Joseph Forte
- (United States) Linton Johnson
- (United States) Kyle Gibson
- (United States) Jamon Gordon
- (United States) Antonio Graves
- (United States) Langston Hall
- (United States) Dwight Hardy
- (United States) Michael Jenkins
- (United States) JaJuan Johnson
- (United States) Bobby Jones
- (United States) Alex Kirk
- (United States) Jerry McCullough
- (United States) Tyrus McGee
- (United States) Landon Milbourne
- (United States) Ronald Moore
- (United States) Jake Odum
- (United States) L. J. Peak
- (United States) Brad Wanamaker
- (United States) Deron Washington
- (United States) C. J. Williams

== Season by season ==
Season	Tier	League	Pos.
2010–11	2	LegaDue	8th
2011–12	2	LegaDue	2nd
2012–13	2	LegaDue	1st
2013–14	1	Serie A	8th
2014–15	1	Serie A	9th
2015–16	1	Serie A	6th
2016–17	1	LBA	7th
2017–18	1	LBA	13th
2018–19	1	LBA	15th
2019–20	1	LBA	15th
2020–21	2	Serie A2	9th
2021–22	2	Serie A2	3rd
2022–23	2	Serie A2	3rd

== Trophies ==
- LegaDue

Winners (1): 2012–13

== Sponsorship names ==
Throughout the years, due to sponsorship, the club has been known as:

- Cassa di Risparmio Pistoia (2002–05)
- Associazione Vivaisti Pistoiesi (2005–06)
- Power Dry Pistoia (2006–07)
- Carmatic Pistoia (2007–10)
- Tuscany Pistoia (2010–11)
- Giorgio Tesi Group Pistoia (2011–2016)
- The Flexx Pistoia (2016–2018)
- OriOra Pistoia (2018–2020)
- Estra Pistoia (2023–present)
