= 2017–18 LBA season =

Serie A PosteMobile^{1}
- Season: 2017–18
- Duration: 1 October 2017 – 15 June 2018
- Games played: 240 (Regular season); 27 (Playoffs)
- Teams: 16
- TV partners: Rai Sport, Eurosport

Regular season
- Top seed: Umana Reyer Venezia
- Season MVP: (United States) Jason Rich
- Relegated: Betaland Capo d'Orlando

Finals
- Champions: EA7 Emporio Armani Milano (28th title)
- Runners-up: Dolomiti Energia Trento
- Semi-finalists: Germani Basket Brescia; Umana Reyer Venezia
- Finals MVP: (United States) Andrew Goudelock

Awards
- Best Young Player: (Italy) Diego Flaccadori

Statistical leaders
Points	(United States) Jason Rich	19.3
Rebounds	(Italy) Christian Burns	10.2
Assists	(Italy) Luca Vitali	6.2
Index Rating	(Italy) Christian Burns	20.0

Records
- Biggest home win: Reggio Emilia 90–42 Pistoia (11 November 2017); Trento 107–59 Capo d'Orlando (31 March 2018)
- Biggest away win: Capo d'Orlando 59–91 Venezia (2 January 2018)
- Highest scoring: Cremona 119–95 Capo d'Orlando (9 May 2018)
- Winning streak: 9 games EA7 Emporio Armani Milano; Germani Basket Brescia
- Losing streak: 14 games Betaland Capo d'Orlando
- Highest attendance: 12,759; EA7 Milano 91–90 Trento (13 June 2018)
- Average attendance: 1,038,397 (3,904 per match)
- ^{1} Sponsored league name, referring to PosteMobile.

The 2017–18 Lega Basket Serie A, was the 96th season of the Lega Basket Serie A (LBA), known for sponsorship reasons as the Serie A PosteMobile, which is highest-tier level professional basketball league in Italy. The regular season started on October 1, 2017, and ended on May 9, 2018, with the playoffs started on May 12 (due to some Italian clubs, Reggio Emilia, Avellino and Venezia, are qualifying for the 2018 EuroCup Playoffs and the 2018 Champions League Playoffs) and finished on June 15, 2018.

As in previous years, Molten Corporation provided the official ball for all matches.

Umana Reyer Venezia were the defending champions. Venezia finished the regular season as top seeded team for the first time in its history.

EA7 Emporio Armani Milano won their 28th title by beating Dolomiti Energia Trento in game 6 of the finals.

== Teams ==
=== Promotion and relegation (pre-season) ===
A total of 16 teams contested the league, including 15 sides from the 2016–17 season and one promoted from the 2016–17 Serie A2.

Segafredo Virtus Bologna was the promoted club from the Serie A2 Citroën after beating Alma Trieste at game 3 of league's playoffs, and returned in the highest-tier of the Italian basketball league system after just one season of absence.

Virtus Bologna replaced Vanoli Cremona who were relegated during the previous season.

In July 2017, Juvecaserta Basket was excluded by CONI from the 2017–18 LBA season, due to financial issues. Vanoli Cremona was reprieved and took the place of Juvecaserta.

=== Number of teams by region ===
Number of teams	Region	Team(s)
5	Lombardy	EA7 Emporio Armani Milano; Germani Basket Brescia; Openjobmetis Varese; Red October Cantù; Vanoli Cremona◆
2	Emilia-Romagna	Grissin Bon Reggio Emilia; Segafredo Virtus Bologna ^{A2}
1	Apulia	New Basket Brindisi
1	Campania	Sidigas Avellino
1	Marche	VL Pesaro
1	Piedmont	Fiat Torino
1	Sardinia	Banco di Sardegna Sassari
1	Sicily	Betaland Capo d'Orlando
1	Trentino-Alto Adige/Südtirol	Dolomiti Energia Trento
1	Tuscany	The Flexx Pistoia
1	Veneto	Umana Reyer Venezia ^{LBA}

Notes
^LBA 2016–17 LBA champion.
^A2 2016–17 Serie A2 champion.

◆ Vanoli Cremona took the place of Pasta Reggia Caserta which was excluded from the 2017-18 LBA season.

=== Venues and locations ===
Location of teams in 2017–18 Lega Basket Serie A

Team	Home city	Arena	Capacity	2016–17 season
Banco di Sardegna Sassari	Sassari	PalaSerradimigni	5,000	Quarterfinals 2017 playoffs
Betaland Capo d'Orlando	Capo d'Orlando	PalaSikeliArchivi	3,508	Quarterfinals 2017 playoffs
Dolomiti Energia Trento	Trento	PalaTrento	4,360	Runners-up 2016 playoffs
EA7 Emporio Armani Milano	Milan	Mediolanum Forum	12,700	Semifinals 2017 playoffs
Fiat Torino	Turin	PalaRuffini	4,500	11th in Serie A
Germani Basket Brescia	Brescia	PalaGeorge	5,500	10th in Serie A
Grissin Bon Reggio Emilia	Reggio Emilia	Land Rover Arena (Bologna)	5,570	Quarterfinals 2017 playoffs
Grissin Bon Reggio Emilia	Reggio Emilia	PalaBigi	4,600	Quarterfinals 2017 playoffs
New Basket Brindisi	Brindisi	PalaPentassuglia	3,534	9th in Serie A
Openjobmetis Varese	Varese	PalA2A	5,100	12th in Serie A
Red October Cantù	Cantù	PalaBancoDesio (Desio)	6,700	14th in Serie A
Segafredo Virtus Bologna	Bologna	Unipol Arena	9,513	Serie A2 playoffs winner
Sidigas Avellino	Avellino	PalaDelMauro	5,195	Semifinals 2017 playoffs
The Flexx Pistoia	Pistoia	PalaCarrara	4,000	Quarterfinals 2017 playoffs
Umana Reyer Venezia	Venice	Taliercio	3,506	LBA Champions
Vanoli Cremona	Cremona	PalaRadi	3,527	16th in Serie A
VL Pesaro	Pesaro	Adriatic Arena	10,323	15th in Serie A

=== Personnel and sponsorship ===
Team	Chairman	Head coach	Captain	Kit manufacturer	Shirt sponsor
Banco di Sardegna Sassari	(Italy) Stefano Sardara	(North Macedonia) Zare Markovski	(Italy) Giacomo Devecchi	Eyesportwear	Banco di Sardegna
Betaland Capo d'Orlando	(Italy) Roberto Enzo Sindoni	(Italy) Andrea Mazzon	(Croatia) Mario Delaš	Legea	Betaland
Dolomiti Energia Trento	(Italy) Luigi Longhi	(Italy) Maurizio Buscaglia	(Argentina) Andrés Pablo Forray	Spalding	Dolomiti Energia
EA7 Emporio Armani Milano	(Italy) Livio Proli	(Italy) Simone Pianigiani	(Italy) Andrea Cinciarini	Armani	EA7 Emporio Armani
Fiat Torino	(Italy) Antonio Forni	(Italy) Paolo Galbiati	(Italy) Giuseppe Poeta	Spalding	Fiat Automobiles
Germani Basket Brescia	(Italy) Graziella Bragaglio	(Italy) Andrea Diana	(United States) David Moss	Erreà	Germani Trasporti
Grissin Bon Reggio Emilia	(Italy) Maria Licia Ferrarini	(Italy) Massimiliano Menetti	(Italy) Riccardo Cervi	Sportika	Grissin Bon
New Basket Brindisi	(Italy) Fernando Marino	(Italy) Francesco Vitucci	(Italy) Marco Cardillo	Bitre Sport	Enel
Openjobmetis Varese	(Italy) Marco Vittorelli	(Italy) Attilio Caja	(Italy) Giancarlo Ferrero	Spalding	Openjobmetis
Red October Cantù	(Russia) Dmitry Gerasimenko	(Italy) Marco Sodini	(United States) Jeremy Chappell	Macron	Red October Steel Works
Segafredo Virtus Bologna	(Italy) Alberto Bucci	(Italy) Alessandro Ramagli	(Albania) Klaudio Ndoja	Macron	Segafredo Zanetti
Sidigas Avellino	(Italy) Giuseppe Sampietro	(Italy) Stefano Sacripanti	(United States) Maarty Leunen	Joma	Sidigas
The Flexx Pistoia	(Italy) Roberto Maltinti	(Italy) Vincenzo Esposito	(Italy) Michele Antonutti	Erreà	The Flexx
Umana Reyer Venezia	(Italy) Luigi Brugnaro	(Italy) Walter De Raffaele	(Italy) Tomas Ress	Erreà	Umana
Vanoli Cremona	(Italy) Aldo Vanoli	(Italy) Romeo Sacchetti	(Italy) Giulio Gazzotti	Erreà	Ferramenta Vanoli
VL Pesaro	(Italy) Ario Costa	(Italy) Massimo Galli	(Italy) Marco Ceron	Erreà	Consultinvest

=== Managerial changes ===
Team	Outgoing manager	Manner of departure	Date of vacancy	Position in table	Replaced by	Date of appointment
Fiat Torino	(Italy) Francesco Vitucci	Sacked	22 May 2017	Pre-season	(Italy) Luca Banchi	25 May 2017
EA7 Emporio Armani Milano	(Croatia) Jasmin Repeša	Mutual consent	3 June 2017	Pre-season	(Italy) Simone Pianigiani	29 June 2017
Vanoli Cremona	(Italy) Paolo Lepore	Sacked	9 June 2017	Pre-season	(Italy) Romeo Sacchetti	15 June 2017
New Basket Brindisi	(Italy) Romeo Sacchetti	Signed with Vanoli Cremona	15 June 2017	Pre-season	(Italy) Sandro Dell'Agnello	1 July 2017
Red October Cantù	(Italy) Carlo Recalcati	Resigned	1 August 2017	Pre-season	(Ukraine) Kyrylo Bol'shakov	22 August 2017
Red October Cantù	(Ukraine) Kyrylo Bol'shakov	Resigned	6 October 2017	13th (0–1)	(Italy) Marco Sodini	6 October 2017
New Basket Brindisi	(Italy) Sandro Dell'Agnello	Sacked	11 December 2017	16th (2–8)	(Italy) Francesco Vitucci	14 December 2017
Fiat Torino	(Italy) Luca Banchi	Resigned	15 January 2018	5th (10–5)	(Italy) Carlo Recalcati	16 January 2018
Fiat Torino	(Italy) Carlo Recalcati	Resigned	5 February 2018	6th (10–8)	(Italy) Paolo Galbiati	5 February 2018
VL Pesaro	(Albania) Spiro Leka	Sacked	27 March 2018	16th (5–18)	(Italy) Massimo Galli	27 March 2018
Betaland Capo d'Orlando	(Italy) Gennaro Di Carlo	Sacked	2 April 2018	15th (5–19)	(Italy) Andrea Mazzon	3 April 2018
Banco di Sardegna Sassari	(Italy) Federico Pasquini	Resigned	3 April 2018	9th (12–12)	(North Macedonia) Zare Markovski	4 April 2018

== Changes from 2016–17 ==
As in previous seasons, LBA clubs must play in arenas that seat at least 3,500 people. From 2017–18 season, all clubs must host their home playoffs matches in arenas with a seating capacity of at least 5,000 people.

In summer 2016, four Italian teams (Reggio Emilia, Trento, Sassari and Cantù) were forced to withdraw from EuroCup because of the FIBA and Euroleague Basketball controversy. From this season, Italian Basketball Federation will allow LBA clubs to rejoin EuroCup. There will be at least six teams in Europe. One in EuroLeague (Olimpia Milano directly enter the EuroLeague as licensed club), two in EuroCup (but they are negotiating with ECA for a third spot) and three in Basketball Champions League. Lega Basket decided Italian Clubs will be free to choose in which European Cup they want to play, based on final ranking and sports merit.

== Rules ==
Each team is allowed either five or seven foreign players under two formulas:

1. 5 foreigners from countries outside the European Union
2. 3 foreigners from countries outside the EU, 4 foreigners from EU countries (also including those from countries signatory of the Cotonou Agreement)

Each club can choose the 5+5 formula, that consists of five Italian players and five foreign players, and the 3+4+5 formula, with five Italian players, three foreigners from countries outside the EU and four foreigners from EU countries or "Cotonou Countries".

At the end of the season there will be a prize of €500.000,00 for the top three ranked teams, that had chosen the 5+5 formula, considering the playing time of Italian players, and €200.000,00 for those teams that will obtain the best results with their youth sector.

== Regular season ==
In the regular season, teams play against each other home-and-away in a round-robin format. The eight first qualified teams advanced to the Playoffs, the last seven qualified teams were eliminated, while the last one qualified team was relegated and replaced by the winner of the playoffs of the second-level Serie A2 Basket. The matchdays were from October 1, 2017 to May 9, 2018.

=== League table ===
Pos	Team	Pld	W	L	PF	PA	PD	Qualification or relegation
1	Umana Reyer Venezia	30	23	7	2481	2364	+117	Qualification to playoffs
2	EA7 Emporio Armani Milano	30	22	8	2463	2244	+219	Qualification to playoffs
3	Germani Basket Brescia	30	20	10	2397	2282	+115	Qualification to playoffs
4	Sidigas Avellino	30	20	10	2492	2313	+179	Qualification to playoffs
5	Dolomiti Energia Trento	30	18	12	2423	2304	+119	Qualification to playoffs
6	Openjobmetis Varese	30	16	14	2355	2271	+84	Qualification to playoffs
7	Red October Cantù	30	16	14	2619	2614	+5	Qualification to playoffs
8	Vanoli Cremona	30	15	15	2554	2495	+59	Qualification to playoffs
9	Segafredo Virtus Bologna	30	15	15	2353	2292	+61	
10	Banco di Sardegna Sassari	30	15	15	2586	2488	+98	
11	Fiat Torino	30	13	17	2432	2494	−62	
12	Grissin Bon Reggio Emilia	30	13	17	2322	2362	−40	
13	The Flexx Pistoia	29	9	20	2267	2449	−182	
14	New Basket Brindisi	29	9	20	2232	2363	−131	
15	VL Pesaro	29	8	21	2310	2547	−237	
16	Betaland Capo d'Orlando (R)	29	7	22	2153	2544	−391	Relegation to Serie A2

Source: LBA
(R) Relegated

=== Results ===
Home \ Away	SAS	CDO	TRE	EA7	TOR	BRE	REG	BRI	VAR	CTU	BOL	AVE	PIS	VEN	CRE	PES
Banco di Sardegna Sassari	—	81–88	78–67	90–69	92–80	76–80	77–67	90–66	87–91	94–80	82–74	88–95	88–81	84–92	102–86	112–81
Betaland Capo d'Orlando	89–103	—	82–80	62–68	70–73	78–88	70–81	67–66	73–75	71–70	69–86	73–77	57–73	59–91	85–95	73–56
Dolomiti Energia Trento	87–81	107–59	—	55–74	79–67	56–66	91–69	85–68	82–74	87–76	78–74	83–94	85–70	79–83	90–79	91–74
EA7 Emporio Armani Milano	116–93	91–54	88–80	—	90–78	74–71	92–78	93–73	74–73	93–77	72–64	92–94	101–74	80–84	82–80	70–75
Fiat Torino	97–92	92–89	88–92	71–59	—	95–86	87–64	68–82	92–83	89–94	65–67	59–77	77–84	82–90	88–80	88–79
Germani Basket Brescia	78–79	87–53	70–78	88–85	98–95	—	79–68	74–60	73–67	86–71	66–70	96–75	76–72	90–71	67–80	88–70
Grissin Bon Reggio Emilia	65–63	69–75	68–82	71–72	89–82	71–75	—	73–77	76–66	86–80	104–99	89–86	90–42	76–81	91–84	95–102
New Basket Brindisi	105–98	74–75	72–77	72–84	67–72	69–78	75–72	—	95–90	86–88	79–75	92–88	88–74	74–77	72–99	93–83
Openjobmetis Varese	61–82	82–58	93–66	76–72	89–92	100–72	80–73	69–95	—	95–64	85–90	82–75	81–73	62–80	89–79	88–68
Red October Cantù	102–96	96–73	88–80	93–98	93–90	84–88	90–79	98–85	85–89	—	94–87	83–82	106–85	92–93	97–80	92–73
Segafredo Virtus Bologna	89–72	88–52	82–75	67–73	84–76	74–76	85–75	94–85	69–71	83–88	—	64–70	75–67	87–88	79–78	85–67
Sidigas Avellino	67–80	97–69	78–74	75–82	72–63	95–96	66–62	89–71	65–61	86–71	87–59	—	101–71	87–77	95–72	103–81
The Flexx Pistoia	69–80	91–69	79–86	63–79	80–65	90–85	74–78	83–77	74–65	82–93	61–74	71–86	—	93–83	76–65	86–83
Umana Reyer Venezia	82–80	104–85	79–78	89–86	91–96	68–61	66–68	76–71	63–75	107–83	71–70	88–74	84–80	—	92–81	72–71
Vanoli Cremona	96–81	119–95	89–96	60–76	92–70	88–86	68–71	92–83	80–72	109–100	91–78	86–73	92–77	83–85	—	92–79
VL Pesaro	88–85	84–81	62–77	64–78	90–95	70–73	96–104	80–75	74–71	82–91	75–81	78–83	80–72	77–74	68–79	—

Source: LBA
Legend: Blue = home team win; Red = away team win.
Matches with lighter background shading were decided after overtime.

=== Positions by round ===
The table lists the positions of teams after completion of each round.

Team \ Round	1	2	3	4	5	6	7	8	9	10	11	12	13	14	15	16	17	18	19	20	21	22	23	24	25	26	27	28	29	30
Umana Reyer Venezia	1	3	3	3	2	4	4	2	4	5	6	5	4	4	4	4	3	3	2	1	1	1	2	2	2	2	1	1	1	1
EA7 Emporio Armani Milano	3	4	2	1	4	3	3	4	3	4	3	3	2	2	3	2	4	4	3	2	2	2	1	1	1	1	2	2	2	2
Germani Basket Brescia	8	1	1	2	1	1	1	1	1	1	1	1	1	3	2	1	1	1	4	3	4	4	3	3	3	3	3	3	3	3
Sidigas Avellino	6	9	4	4	3	5	5	3	2	2	2	2	3	1	1	3	2	2	1	4	3	3	4	4	4	4	4	4	4	4
Dolomiti Energia Trento	7	7	12	12	11	12	13	9	12	11	9	8	6	8	10	10	10	10	8	9	9	8	8	6	5	5	5	5	5	5
Openjobmetis Varese	16	14	9	10	8	7	7	8	11	8	12	13	13	13	16	13	13	12	12	12	12	12	12	11	11	7	6	6	6	6
Red October Cantù	13	11	10	9	9	10	10	7	8	7	7	7	9	7	6	6	8	8	10	7	7	9	6	8	6	9	7	7	7	7
Vanoli Cremona	14	15	13	13	10	8	8	11	10	10	13	10	10	10	8	8	7	7	11	8	10	10	11	7	8	10	10	10	10	8
Segafredo Virtus Bologna	10	10	6	5	6	6	6	10	7	9	10	9	7	9	7	7	5	5	5	6	8	5	5	5	7	6	8	8	8	9
Banco di Sardegna Sassari	4	6	8	7	7	9	11	6	6	6	5	6	8	6	9	9	9	9	7	10	6	6	7	9	10	8	9	9	9	10
Fiat Torino	5	5	5	6	5	2	2	5	5	3	4	4	5	5	5	5	6	6	6	5	5	7	9	10	9	11	11	11	11	11
Grissin Bon Reggio Emilia	11	12	15	15	16	16	15	14	15	15	11	12	12	12	12	11	11	11	9	11	11	11	10	12	12	12	12	12	12	12
The Flexx Pistoia	2	2	7	8	12	11	14	15	14	12	14	14	14	15	13	12	14	14	14	13	13	13	13	13	13	13	13	13	14	13
New Basket Brindisi	12	13	14	16	15	14	16	16	16	16	16	16	16	14	15	14	12	13	13	14	14	14	14	14	14	14	14	14	13	14
VL Pesaro	9	8	11	11	13	15	12	13	13	14	15	15	15	16	14	16	16	16	16	16	16	16	16	16	15	16	16	15	15	15
Betaland Capo d'Orlando	15	16	16	14	14	13	9	12	9	13	8	11	11	11	11	15	15	15	15	15	15	15	15	15	16	15	15	16	16	16

Updated to games played on 9 May 2018
Source: LBA

Leader of the Regular Season
Qualification to Playoffs
Relegation to Serie A2

== Final standings ==
Pos	Team	Pld	W	L	Qualification or relegation
1	EA7 Emporio Armani Milano (C)	43	32	11	Qualification to EuroLeague
2	Dolomiti Energia Trento	44	26	18	Qualification to EuroCup
3	Umana Reyer Venezia	37	27	10	Qualification to Champions League
4	Germani Basket Brescia	37	24	13	Qualification to EuroCup
5	Sidigas Avellino	34	21	13	Qualification to Champions League
6	Openjobmetis Varese	33	16	17	Qualification to FIBA Europe Cup
7	Red October Cantù	33	16	17	Qualification to Champions League
8	Vanoli Cremona	33	15	18	
9	Segafredo Virtus Bologna	30	15	15	Qualification to Champions League
10	Banco di Sardegna Sassari	30	15	15	Qualification to FIBA Europe Cup
11	Fiat Torino	30	13	17	Qualification to EuroCup
12	Grissin Bon Reggio Emilia	30	13	17	
13	The Flexx Pistoia	29	9	20	
14	New Basket Brindisi	29	9	20	
15	VL Pesaro	29	8	21	
16	Betaland Capo d'Orlando (R)	29	7	22	Relegation to Serie A2 Basket

Source: LBA
(C) Champions; (R) Relegated

== Individual statistics ==
As of 9 May 2018.

=== Points ===
Rank	Name	Team	PPG
1.	(United States) Jason Rich	Sidigas Avellino	19.3
2.	(United States) Dallas Moore	VL Pesaro	18.7
3.	(United States) Darius Johnson-Odom	Vanoli Cremona	18.7
4.	(United States) Randy Culpepper	Red October Cantù	17.0
5.	(Italy) Alessandro Gentile	Segafredo Virtus Bologna	16.8

=== Assists ===
Rank	Name	Team	APG
1.	(Italy) Luca Vitali	Germani Basket Brescia	6.2
2.	(United States) Ronald Moore	The Flexx Pistoia	5.8
3.	(United States) Diante Garrett	Fiat Torino	5.4
4.	(Croatia) Rok Stipčević	Banco di Sardegna Sassari	4.5
5.	(United States) Jaime Smith	Red October Cantù	4.4

=== Steals ===
Rank	Name	Team	SPG
1.	(United States) Randy Culpepper	Red October Cantù	2.1
2.	(Nigeria) Emmanuel Omogbo	VL Pesaro	1.7
3.	(United States) Dominique Sutton	Dolomiti Energia Trento	1.7
4.	(United States) Kelvin Martin	Vanoli Cremona	1.7
5.	(United States) Jeremy Chappell	Red October Cantù	1.7

=== Rebounds ===
Rank	Name	Team	RPG
1.	(Italy) Christian Burns	Red October Cantù	10.2
2.	(Haiti) Cady Lalanne	New Basket Brindisi	9.9
3.	(Nigeria) Emmanuel Omogbo	VL Pesaro	8.9
4.	(United States) Tyler Cain	Openjobmetis Varese	8.9
5.	(United States) Dominique Sutton	Dolomiti Energia Trento	7.8

=== Blocks ===
Rank	Name	Team	BPG
1.	(Senegal) Hamady N'Diaye	Sidigas Avellino	2.3
2.	(Haiti) Cady Lalanne	New Basket Brindisi	1.3
3.	(Lithuania) Artūras Gudaitis	EA7 Emporio Armani Milano	1.2
4.	(Netherlands Antilles) Norvel Pelle	Fiat Torino	1.1
5.	(Italy) Andrea Crosariol	Red October Cantù	1.0

=== Valuation ===
Rank	Name	Team	VPG
1.	(Italy) Christian Burns	Red October Cantù	20.0
2.	(Haiti) Cady Lalanne	New Basket Brindisi	19.1
3.	(United States) Darius Johnson-Odom	Vanoli Cremona	18.3
4.	(Nigeria) Trevor Mbakwe	Fiat Torino	18.2
5.	(United States) Randy Culpepper	Red October Cantù	18.0

== Awards ==
=== Finals MVP ===
- (United States) Andrew Goudelock (EA7 Emporio Armani Milano)

=== Most Valuable Player ===
- (United States) Jason Rich (Sidigas Avellino)

=== Best Player Under 22 ===
- (Italy) Diego Flaccadori (Dolomiti Energia Trento)

=== Best Coach ===
- (Italy) Attilio Caja (Openjobmetis Varese)

=== Best Executive ===
- (Italy) Federico Casarin (Umana Reyer Venezia)

=== Round MVP ===
Round	Player	Team	PIR	Ref
1	(Lithuania) Artūras Gudaitis	EA7 Emporio Armani Milano	31	
2	(United States) Dallas Moore	VL Pesaro	37	
3	(United States) Darius Johnson-Odom	Vanoli Cremona	40	
4	(United States) Jeremy Chappell	Red October Cantù	37	
5	(United States) Scott Bamforth	Banco di Sardegna Sassari	28	
5	(United States) Cameron Wells	Openjobmetis Varese	28	
6	(United States) Randy Culpepper	Red October Cantù	41	
7	(Canada) Justin Edwards	Betaland Capo d'Orlando	30	
8	(United States) Nic Moore	New Basket Brindisi	31	
9	(Poland) Jakub Wojciechowski	Betaland Capo d'Orlando	33	
10	(United States) Tyler Cain	Openjobmetis Varese	39	
11	(United States) Dario Hunt	Germani Basket Brescia	38	
12	(United States) Darius Johnson-Odom (2)	Vanoli Cremona	37	
13	(United States) Donta Smith	New Basket Brindisi	36	
14	(United States) Lamar Patterson	Fiat Torino	34	
15	(United States) Jason Rich	Sidigas Avellino	35	
16	(United States) Marcus Slaughter	Segafredo Virtus Bologna	38	
17	(United States) Cameron Wells (2)	Openjobmetis Varese	34	
18	(United States) Tyler Cain (2)	Openjobmetis Varese	32	
19	(Italy) Amedeo Della Valle	Grissin Bon Reggio Emilia	30	
20	(Serbia) Sasha Vujačić	Fiat Torino	32	
20	(United States) Darius Johnson-Odom (3)	Vanoli Cremona	32	
21	(Italy) Achille Polonara	Banco di Sardegna Sassari	31	
22	(Nigeria) Stan Okoye	Openjobmetis Varese	36	
23	(Nigeria) Stan Okoye (2)	Openjobmetis Varese	30	
23	(United States) Tyrus McGee	The Flexx Pistoia	30	
24	(Denmark) Shavon Shields	Dolomiti Energia Trento	33	
25	(United States) Taylor Braun	VL Pesaro	32	
26	(United States) Jason Rich (2)	Sidigas Avellino	32	
27	(United States) Jalen Reynolds	Grissin Bon Reggio Emilia	41	
28	(United States) Tyler Cain (3)	Openjobmetis Varese	28	
29	(Ukraine) Kyrylo Fesenko	Sidigas Avellino	34	
30	(United States) Jalen Reynolds (2)	Grissin Bon Reggio Emilia	52	

== Playoffs ==
The LBA playoffs quarterfinals and semifinals were best-of-five, while the finals series were best-of-seven. The playoffs started on May 12, 2018, and finished on June 15, 2018.

Quarterfinals
1	Reyer Venezia	3
8	Vanoli Cremona	0
4	Sidigas Avellino	1
5	Dolomiti Energia Trento	3
2	EA7 Emporio Armani Milano	3
7	Red October Cantù	0
3	Germani Basket Brescia	3
6	Openjobmetis Varese	0

Semifinals
1	Umana Reyer Venezia	1
5	Dolomiti Energia Trento	3
2	EA7 Emporio Armani Milano	3
3	Germani Basket Brescia	1

Finals
5	Dolomiti Energia Trento	2
2	EA7 Emporio Armani Milano	4

== Serie A clubs in European competitions ==
Team	Competition	Progress	Ref
EA7 Emporio Armani Milano	EuroLeague	15th qualified	
Dolomiti Energia Trento	EuroCup	Top 16	
Grissin Bon Reggio Emilia	EuroCup	Semifinals	
Fiat Torino	EuroCup	Top 16	
Betaland Capo d'Orlando	Champions League	Regular season	
Banco di Sardegna Sassari	FIBA Europe Cup	Top 16	
Sidigas Avellino	FIBA Europe Cup	Runners-up	
Umana Reyer Venezia	FIBA Europe Cup	Champions	

== Supercup ==
The 2017 Italian Supercup, also called Prozis Supercoppa 2017 for sponsorship reasons, was the 23rd edition of the super cup tournament of the Italian basketball. The Supercup opened the season on 23 and 24 September 2017, and it was contested in the Unieuro Arena in Forlì.

EA7 Emporio Armani Milano were the defending champions.

Qualified for the tournament were Banco di Sardegna Sassari, EA7 Emporio Armani Milano, Umana Reyer Venezia and Dolomiti Energia Trento.

EA7 Emporio Armani Milano lifted the Supercup trophy by downing Umana Reyer Venezia 82–77. Jordan Theodore led the winners with 29 points on 10-of-17 two-point shots. Andrew Goudelock and Amath M'Baye added 14 while Artūras Gudaitis had 12 and 8 rebounds for Milan. Not enough for Venezia the 14 points each for Michael Jenkins, Dominique Johnson and Michael Bramos and the 13 points of Hrvoje Perić. Coach Simone Pianigiani's guys controlled the game until the final buzzer and lift its second Supercup trophy. Jordan Theodore was named MVP of the competition.

== Cup ==
The 50th edition of the Italian Cup, knows as the PosteMobile Final Eight for sponsorship reasons, was contested between 16 and 19 February 2017 in the Nelson Mandela Forum, Florence. Eight teams qualified for the Final Eight were Avellino, Brescia, Milano, Venezia, Torino, Cantù, Bologna and Cremona.

EA7 Emporio Armani Milano were the defending champions.

Fiat Torino made it to the Italian Cup final after edging Vanoli Cremona in overtime 87–92. Cremona's Simone Fontecchio drove for a layup with 16 seconds to go in the regulation to tie the game at 80-80, and Fiat failed to convert the final possession of the fourth quarter to win the game. But Diante Garrett scored a basket and Sasha Vujačić hit a triple midway through the extra session to give Fiat 83–88, the lead it never relinquished. Garrett finished with 18 points, Vander Blue scored 17, while Vujačić netted 15 points with 7 rebounds. Deron Washington amassed 13 points plus 13 rebounds in victory, while Fontecchio had 16 points in defeat. The second semifinal also went into overtime in which Germani Basket Brescia ousted Red October Cantù 82–87. Luca Vitali collected 19 points and 9 rebounds, while Marcus Landry had 17 points for the winners. Charles Thomas scored 20 points, and Jeremy Chappell amassed 17 points plus 13 rebounds for Cantù.

In the final game Sasha Vujačić’s layup in the dying seconds lifted Fiat Torino to a 69–67 victory over Germani Basket Brescia for the club's first Italian Cup. After a series of threes in the closing seconds left the game tied, Brescia had the ball for what appeared to be the final possession, however Marcus Landry and Luca Vitali each missed from downtown, Deron Washington picked up the loose ball and started a fast break that Vujacic finished with the winning layup. Diante Garrett paced Fiat with 16 points, Nobel Boungou Colo and Vander Blue added 11 points apiece and Washington scored 10 for the winners. Landry paced Brescia with 22 points and 9 rebounds and Michele Vitali added 14 points in defeat.

Vander Blue of Torino was named Finals MVP of the competition.
