= 2018 Italian Basketball Cup =

Tournament details
- Arena: Nelson Mandela Forum; Florence, Italy
- Dates: 15–18 February 2018

Final positions
- Champions: Fiat Torino (1st title)
- Runners-up: Germani Basket Brescia

Awards and statistics
- MVP: (United States) Vander Blue

The 2018 Italian Basketball Cup, known as the 2018 PosteMobile Final Eight for sponsorship reasons, was the 50th edition of Italy's national cup tournament. The competition is managed by the Lega Basket for LBA clubs. The tournament was played from 15 to 18 February 2018 in Florence, at the end of the first half of the 2017–18 LBA season.

EA7 Emporio Armani Milano were the defending champions.

Fiat Torino went to win its first Cup ever by beating Germani Basket Brescia 69–67 in the Finals. Vander Blue was named Finals MVP of the competition.

== Qualification ==
Qualified for the tournament were selected based on their position on the league table at the end of the first half of the 2017–18 LBA regular season.

Pos	Team	Pld	W	L	PF	PA	PD	Qualification
1	Sidigas Avellino	15	12	3	1248	1148	+100	Qualified as seeded teams
2	Germani Basket Brescia	15	11	4	1184	1087	+97	Qualified as seeded teams
3	EA7 Emporio Armani Milano	15	11	4	1153	1072	+81	Qualified as seeded teams
4	Umana Reyer Venezia	15	11	4	1227	1185	+42	Qualified as seeded teams
5	Fiat Torino	15	10	5	1219	1186	+33	Qualified as non-seeded teams
6	Red October Cantù	15	8	7	1290	1285	+5	Qualified as non-seeded teams
7	Segafredo Virtus Bologna	15	8	7	1191	1154	+37	Qualified as non-seeded teams
8	Vanoli Cremona	15	8	7	1226	1199	+27	Qualified as non-seeded teams

Source: LBA

== Bracket ==
Quarter-finals; 15–16 February
1	Sidigas Avellino	82
8	Vanoli Cremona	89
4	Umana Reyer Venezia	60
5	Fiat Torino	72
3	EA7 Emporio Armani Milano	87
6	Red October Cantù	105
2	Germani Basket Brescia	97
7	Segafredo Virtus Bologna	83

Semifinals; 17 February
8	Vanoli Cremona	87
5	Fiat Torino	92
6	Red October Cantù	82
2	Germani Basket Brescia	87

Final; 18 February
5	Fiat Torino	69
2	Germani Basket Brescia	67

== Quarterfinals ==
=== Sidigas Avellino vs. Vanoli Cremona ===
15 February 2018 Quarterfinal A	Sidigas Avellino	82–89	Vanoli Cremona	Florence
18:00 (CET)	Scoring by quarter: 22–18, 18–14, 13–19, 21–23
Eurosport; RAI	Pts: Rich 30; Rebs: Fesenko 19; Asts: Leunen 5 PIR: Rich 34	Boxscore	Pts: D. Diener 19; Rebs: Sims 9 Asts: T. Diener 8 PIR: Johnson-Odom 19	Arena: Nelson Mandela Forum; Referees: Tolga Sahin, Gabriele Bettini, Dario Morelli

Starters:			Pts	Reb	Ast
PG	12	(Italy) Ariel Filloy	6	5	1
SG	24	(Italy) Lorenzo D'Ercole	12	4	0
SG	25	(United States) Jason Rich	30	4	3
PF	10	(United States) Maarty Leunen	2	6	5
C	44	(Ukraine) Kyrylo Fesenko	19	19	1
Reserves:					
F/C	0	(Italy) Andrea Zerini	0	1	0
G/F	1	(United States) Dez Wells	2	1	0
PG	6	(Uruguay) Bruno Fitipaldo	5	0	0
SF	11	(Canada) Thomas Scrubb	2	0	0
C	55	(Senegal) Hamady N'Diaye	4	2	0
G	57	(Italy) Salvatore Parlato	DNP		
Head coach:
(Italy) Stefano Sacripanti

Sidigas Avellino	Vanoli Cremona

Starters:			Pts	Reb	Ast
PG	10	(Italy) Michele Ruzzier	5	1	1
SG	20	(United States) Darius Johnson-Odom	18	5	2
SF	2	(Italy) Simone Fontecchio	5	7	0
PF	1	(United States) Kelvin Martin	11	6	1
C	14	(United States) Henry Sims	16	9	0
Reserves:					
PF	6	(Italy) Giulio Gazzotti	DNP		
PG	7	(Italy) Travis Diener	0	3	8
F	8	(Italy) Giampaolo Ricci	12	4	0
G	11	(Italy) Marco Portannese	DNP		
SG	16	(United States) Drake Diener	19	4	1
F	23	(United States) Landon Milbourne	3	2	1
Head coach:
(Italy) Romeo Sacchetti

=== Umana Reyer Venezia vs. Fiat Torino ===
15 February 2018 Quarterfinal B	Umana Reyer Venezia	60–72	Fiat Torino	Florence
20:45 (CET)	Scoring by quarter: 4–21, 25–23, 17–16, 14–12
Eurosport; RAI	Pts: Watt 19; Rebs: Watt 11; Asts: four players 2 PIR: Watt 17	Boxscore	Pts: Garrett 17; Rebs: Boungou Colo 8 Asts: five players 2 PIR: Boungou Colo 15	Arena: Nelson Mandela Forum; Referees: Maurizio Biggi, Gianluca Sardella, Evangelista Caiazza

Starters:			Pts	Reb	Ast
PG	0	(Georgia (country)) MarQuez Haynes	9	2	2
SG	6	(Greece) Michael Bramos	8	4	2
SF	7	(Italy) Stefano Tonut	1	3	2
PF	2	(Croatia) Hrvoje Perić	8	8	0
C	50	(United States) Mitchell Watt	19	11	0
Reserves:					
SG	3	(United States) Dominique Johnson	3	1	0
F	9	(United States) Austin Daye	6	8	1
PG	10	(Italy) Andrea De Nicolao	6	1	2
F/C	13	(Italy) Riccardo Bolpin	DNP		
F/C	14	(Italy) Tomas Ress	0	1	0
C	19	(Italy) Paul Biligha	0	1	0
G/F	30	(Italy) Bruno Cerella	0	0	0
Head coach:
(Italy) Walter De Raffaele

Umana Reyer Venezia	Fiat Torino

Starters:			Pts	Reb	Ast
PG	2	(United States) Diante Garrett	17	3	1
SG	21	(Slovakia) Andre Jones	8	3	1
SF	17	(United States) Deron Washington	11	7	2
PF	16	(France) Nobel Boungou Colo	9	8	2
C	32	(Nigeria) Trevor Mbakwe	8	5	1
Reserves:					
PG	1	(United States) Vander Blue	4	0	2
G/F	6	(Slovenia) Sasha Vujačić	2	3	2
PG	8	(Italy) Giuseppe Poeta	4	2	2
F/C	22	(Italy) Valerio Mazzola	9	7	0
PG	23	(Italy) Mohamed Touré	DNP		
G	24	(Italy) Lorenzo Mittica	DNP		
G	25	(Italy) Guy Akoua	DNP		
Head coach:
(Italy) Paolo Galbiati

=== EA7 Emporio Armani Milano vs. Red October Cantù ===
16 February 2018 Quarterfinal C	EA7 Emporio Armani Milano	87–105	Red October Cantù	Florence
18:00 (CET)	Scoring by quarter: 18–28, 20–29, 25–23, 24–25
Eurosport; RAI	Pts: Goudelock 23; Rebs: three players 7 Asts: Theodore 6 PIR: Theodore 23	Boxscore	Pts: Smith 23; Rebs: Christian Burns 12; Asts: Smith 8 PIR: Smith 34	Arena: Nelson Mandela Forum; Referees: Saverio Lanzarini, Luca Weidmann, Alessandro Vicino

Starters:			Pts	Reb	Ast
PG	25	(North Macedonia) Jordan Theodore	16	7	6
SG	0	(United States) Andrew Goudelock	23	1	2
SF	5	(Serbia) Vladimir Micov	7	7	2
PF	19	(Lithuania) Mindaugas Kuzminskas	10	3	0
C	22	(Italy) Marco Cusin	4	7	1
Reserves:					
G	6	(Italy) Enrico Mario Tomba	DNP		
PF	7	(Italy) Davide Pascolo	6	3	0
PG	20	(Italy) Andrea Cinciarini	9	0	1
SF	23	(Italy) Awudu Abass	3	2	2
SG	45	(Latvia) Dairis Bertāns	6	1	0
PG	55	(United States) Curtis Jerrells	0	2	0
C	77	(Lithuania) Artūras Gudaitis	3	4	0
Head coach:
(Italy) Simone Pianigiani

EA7 Emporio Armani Milano	Red October Cantù

Starters:			Pts	Reb	Ast
PG	2	(United States) Jaime Smith	23	0	8
SG	21	(United States) Jeremy Chappell	19	4	3
SF	5	(Italy) David Cournooh	12	4	3
PF	23	(Italy) Christian Burns	14	12	3
C	25	(United States) Charles Thomas	16	2	0
Reserves:					
C	4	(Italy) Luca Pappalardo	DNP		
G	8	(Italy) Salvatore Parrillo	12	3	1
G	10	(Italy) Maurizio Tassone	0	0	0
C	15	(Italy) Andrea Crosariol	DNP		
F	19	(Italy) Giacomo Maspero	9	4	1
F	20	(Italy) Davide Raucci	0	0	0
Head coach:
(Italy) Marco Sodini

=== Germani Basket Brescia vs. Segafredo Virtus Bologna ===
16 February 2018 Quarterfinal D	Germani Basket Brescia	97–83	Segafredo Virtus Bologna	Florence
20:45 (CET)	Scoring by quarter: 26–17, 20–20, 22–19, 29–27
Eurosport; RAI	Pts: Moore 22; Rebs: Vitali 7 Asts: Vitali 6 PIR: Moore 25	Boxscore	Pts: Lawson 17; Rebs: Slaughter 7 Asts: Umeh 5 PIR: Lawson 18	Arena: Nelson Mandela Forum; Referees: Carmelo Lo Guzzo, Lorenzo Baldini, Mark Bartoli

Starters:			Pts	Reb	Ast
PG	7	(Italy) Luca Vitali	20	7	6
SG	2	(United States) Lee Moore	22	3	2
SF	34	(United States) David Moss	6	2	3
PF	8	(United States) Marcus Landry	8	2	0
C	4	(United States) Dario Hunt	8	4	0
Reserves:					
G	5	(Italy) Martino Mastellari	DNP		
C	10	(Austria) Benjamin Ortner	2	4	0
PG	26	(Italy) Andrea Traini	10	1	0
G	31	(Italy) Michele Vitali	17	2	2
F	41	(Italy) Brian Sacchetti	4	4	2
Head coach:
(Italy) Andrea Diana

Germani Basket Brescia	Segafredo Virtus Bologna

Starters:			Pts	Reb	Ast
PG	20	(Croatia) Oliver Lafayette	14	0	2
SG	3	(Nigeria) Michael Umeh	11	2	5
SF	0	(Italy) Alessandro Gentile	11	3	3
PF	8	(Italy) Filippo Baldi Rossi	5	4	0
C	44	(United States) Marcus Slaughter	9	7	2
Reserves:					
PG	6	(Italy) Alessandro Pajola	2	0	0
F	13	(Albania) Klaudio Ndoja	12	3	0
PG	22	(Italy) Stefano Gentile	2	3	4
C	23	(Italy) Matteo Berti	DNP		
C	25	(United States) Kenny Lawson	17	4	0
Head coach:
(Italy) Alessandro Ramagli

== Semifinals ==
=== Vanoli Cremona vs. Fiat Torino ===
17 February 2018 Semifinal A	Vanoli Cremona	87–92(OT)	Fiat Torino	Florence
18:00 (CET)	Scoring by quarter: 22–12, 18–28, 21–15, 19–25, Overtime: 7–12
Eurosport; RAI	Pts: Fontecchio 16; Rebs: Sims 7 Asts: Johnson-Odom, Ruzzier 3 PIR: Diener 12	Boxscore	Pts: Garrett 18; Rebs: Washington 13; Asts: Poeta 3 PIR: Washington 24	Arena: Nelson Mandela Forum; Referees: Carmelo Paternico', Alessandro Martolini, Beniamino Manuel Attard

Starters:			Pts	Reb	Ast
PG	10	(Italy) Michele Ruzzier	4	2	3
SG	20	(United States) Darius Johnson-Odom	14	1	3
SF	2	(Italy) Simone Fontecchio	16	2	0
PF	1	(United States) Kelvin Martin	7	4	2
C	14	(United States) Henry Sims	9	7	0
Reserves:					
PF	6	(Italy) Giulio Gazzotti	DNP		
PG	7	(Italy) Travis Diener	6	5	1
F	8	(Italy) Giampaolo Ricci	9	6	0
G	11	(Italy) Marco Portannese	0	2	1
SG	16	(United States) Drake Diener	11	2	2
F	23	(United States) Landon Milbourne	11	5	1
Head coach:
(Italy) Romeo Sacchetti

Vanoli Cremona	Fiat Torino

Starters:			Pts	Reb	Ast
PG	2	(United States) Diante Garrett	18	6	2
SG	21	(Slovakia) Andre Jones	3	3	0
SF	17	(United States) Deron Washington	13	13	1
PF	16	(France) Nobel Boungou Colo	7	8	1
C	32	(Nigeria) Trevor Mbakwe	3	3	0
Reserves:					
PG	1	(United States) Vander Blue	17	1	1
G/F	6	(Slovenia) Sasha Vujačić	15	7	0
PG	8	(Italy) Giuseppe Poeta	9	0	3
F/C	22	(Italy) Valerio Mazzola	7	5	0
PG	23	(Italy) Mohamed Touré	DNP		
G	24	(Italy) Lorenzo Mittica	DNP		
G	25	(Italy) Guy Akoua	DNP		
Head coach:
(Italy) Paolo Galbiati

=== Red October Cantù vs. Germani Basket Brescia ===
17 February 2018 Semifinal B	Red October Cantù	82–87(OT)	Germani Basket Brescia	Florence
20:45 (CET)	Scoring by quarter: 18–20, 21–23, 17–20, 20–13, Overtime: 6–11
Eurosport; RAI	Pts: Thomas 20; Rebs: Burns 14; Asts: Smith, Chappell 4 PIR: Chappell 20	Boxscore	Pts: Vitali 19; Rebs: Hunt 11; Asts: Vitali 4 PIR: Vitali 30	Arena: Nelson Mandela Forum; Referees: Enrico Sabetta, Michele Rossi, Emanuele Aronne

Starters:			Pts	Reb	Ast
PG	2	(United States) Jaime Smith	19	0	4
SG	21	(United States) Jeremy Chappell	17	13	4
SF	5	(Italy) David Cournooh	4	3	0
PF	23	(Italy) Christian Burns	11	14	2
C	25	(United States) Charles Thomas	20	4	2
Reserves:					
C	4	(Italy) Luca Pappalardo	DNP		
G	8	(Italy) Salvatore Parrillo	11	5	0
G	10	(Italy) Maurizio Tassone	0	0	0
C	15	(Italy) Andrea Crosariol	DNP		
F	19	(Italy) Giacomo Maspero	0	1	0
F	20	(Italy) Davide Raucci	0	0	1
Head coach:
(Italy) Marco Sodini

Red October Cantù	Germani Basket Brescia

Starters:			Pts	Reb	Ast
PG	7	(Italy) Luca Vitali	19	9	4
SG	2	(United States) Lee Moore	15	9	3
SF	34	(United States) David Moss	5	1	2
PF	8	(United States) Marcus Landry	17	5	2
C	4	(United States) Dario Hunt	9	11	1
Reserves:					
G	5	(Italy) Martino Mastellari	DNP		
C	10	(Austria) Benjamin Ortner	4	4	0
PG	26	(Italy) Andrea Traini	3	1	2
G	31	(Italy) Michele Vitali	10	5	1
F	41	(Italy) Brian Sacchetti	5	2	2
Head coach:
(Italy) Andrea Diana

== Final ==
In the final game Sasha Vujačić’s layup in the dying seconds lifted Fiat Torino to a 69-67 victory over Germani Basket Brescia for the club’s first Italian Cup. After a series of threes in the closing seconds left the game tied, Brescia had the ball for what appeared to be the final possession, however Marcus Landry and Luca Vitali each missed from downtown, Deron Washington picked up the loose ball and started a fast break that Vujacic finished with the winning layup. Diante Garrett paced Fiat with 16 points, Nobel Boungou Colo and Vander Blue added 11 points apiece and Washington scored 10 for the winners. Landry paced Brescia with 22 points and 9 rebounds and Michele Vitali added 14 points in defeat.

=== Fiat Torino vs. Germani Basket Brescia ===
18 February 2018 Final	Fiat Torino	69–67	Germani Basket Brescia	Florence
18:00 (CET)	Scoring by quarter: 11–14, 17–17, 25–25, 16–11
Eurosport; RAI	Pts: Garrett 16; Rebs: Mazzola 11; Asts: Poeta 4 PIR: Mazzola 17	Boxscore	Pts: Landry 22; Rebs: Landry 9 Asts: Vitali 10; PIR: Landry 20	Arena: Nelson Mandela Forum; Referees: Saverio Lanzarini, Carmelo Lo Guzzo, Lorenzo Baldini

Starters:			Pts	Reb	Ast
PG	2	(United States) Diante Garrett	16	4	2
SG	1	(United States) Vander Blue	11	2	1
SF	17	(United States) Deron Washington	10	7	3
PF	16	(France) Nobel Boungou Colo	11	2	0
C	32	(Nigeria) Trevor Mbakwe	1	5	1
Reserves:					
G/F	6	(Slovenia) Sasha Vujačić	7	4	1
PG	8	(Italy) Giuseppe Poeta	7	2	4
SG	21	(Slovakia) Andre Jones	0	0	1
F/C	22	(Italy) Valerio Mazzola	6	11	0
PG	23	(Italy) Mohamed Touré	DNP		
G	24	(Italy) Lorenzo Mittica	DNP		
G	25	(Italy) Guy Akoua	DNP		
Head coach:
(Italy) Paolo Galbiati

Fiat Torino	Germani Basket Brescia

Italian Cup MVP
(United States) Vander Blue
Game rules
Game played under FIBA rules.

2018 Italian Cup Winners

Fiat Torino
1st title

Starters:			Pts	Reb	Ast
PG	7	(Italy) Luca Vitali	5	6	10
SG	2	(United States) Lee Moore	2	5	0
SF	34	(United States) David Moss	2	5	2
PF	8	(United States) Marcus Landry	22	9	1
C	4	(United States) Dario Hunt	6	6	0
Reserves:					
G	5	(Italy) Martino Mastellari	DNP		
C	10	(Austria) Benjamin Ortner	4	0	1
SG	16	(Italy) Giovanni Veronesi	DNP		
C	20	(Italy) Abdel Fall	DNP		
PG	26	(Italy) Andrea Traini	0	2	1
G	31	(Italy) Michele Vitali	14	3	2
F	41	(Italy) Brian Sacchetti	12	2	2
Head coach:
(Italy) Andrea Diana

== Sponsors ==
- PosteMobile (title sponsor)
- Panasonic (main sponsor)
- Fastweb (technology partner)
- Molten (official ball)
- MyGlass (official partner)
- Prozis (official nutrition partner)
- Frecciarossa (official train)
- Timex Group (timing partner)
- Erreà (technical sponsor)
- Eurosport (official broadcaster)
- Rai Sport (official broadcaster)
- Radio Italia (official radio)
- Anthea
- Comune di Firenze
- ACF Fiorentina
