= Lee Moore =

Lee Moore is the name of:

- Lee Moore (country singer) (1914–1997), American country musician and radio DJ
- Lee Moore (politician) (1939–2000), premier of Saint Kitts and Nevis
- Lee Moore (athlete) (born 1988), American hurdler, see United States at the 2011 Pan American Games
- Lee Moore (basketball) (born 1995), American basketball player

== See also ==
- Lemoore, California, city in California formerly named "Lee Moore's"
- Moore (surname)
