= Valerio Mazzola =

Italian basketball player (born 1988)

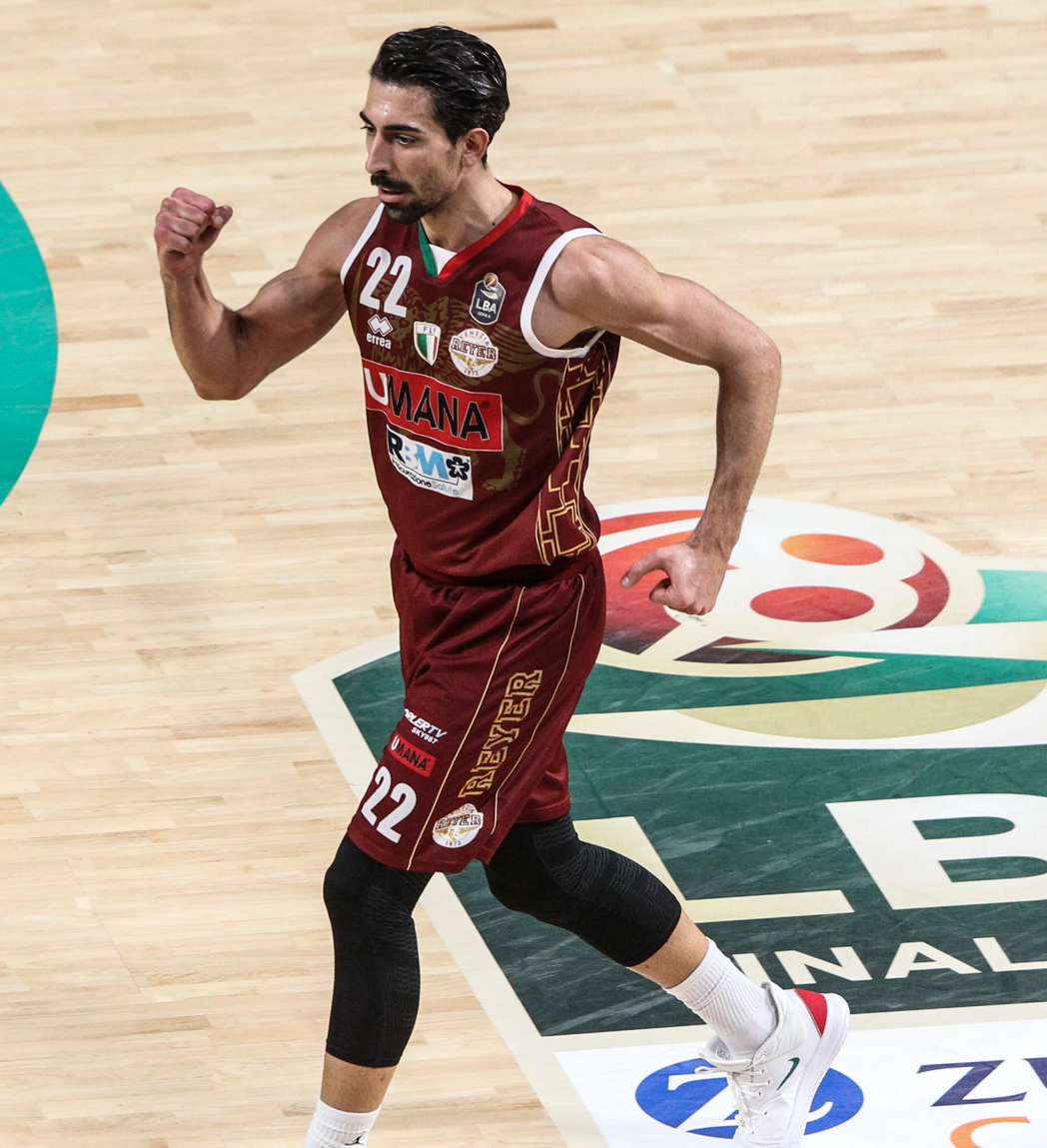

Free Agent
- Position: Power forward/center

Personal information
- Born: 7 March 1988 (age 38) Ferrara, Italy
- Listed height: 2.05 m (6 ft 9 in)
- Listed weight: 107 kg (236 lb)

Career information
- Playing career: 2006–present

Career history
- 2006–2011: Basket Ferrara
- 2011–2014: Sutor Montegranaro
- 2014–2016: Virtus Bologna
- 2016–2018: Auxilium Torino
- 2018–2022: Reyer Venezia
- 2022–2024: Victoria Libertas Pesaro
- 2024–2025: Treviso Basket

Career highlights
- Italian Cup champion (2018)

Valerio Mazzola (born 7 March 1988) is an Italian basketball player who last played for Treviso Basket of the Lega Basket Serie A. He is a 6 ft 9 in (2.05 m) power forward and center.

== Professional career ==
On 28 March 2011 Valerio Mazzola signed with Sutor Basket Montegranaro in Lega Basket Serie A.

On 4 August 2014 Mazzola signed with the LBA club Virtus Bologna.

On 4 July 2016 he went to Turin to play with Auxilium Torino.

On 18 July 2018 Mazzola signed a deal with Reyer Venezia. He signed a multi-year contract extension with the team on 20 June 2020.

On 1 July 2022 he signed with Victoria Libertas Pesaro of the Italian Lega Basket Serie A (LBA).

On 15 June 2024 he signed with Treviso Basket of the Lega Basket Serie A.

== Honours ==
Auxilium Torino

- Italian Cup (1): 2018
