= Paolo Galbiati =

Italian basketball coach (born 1984)

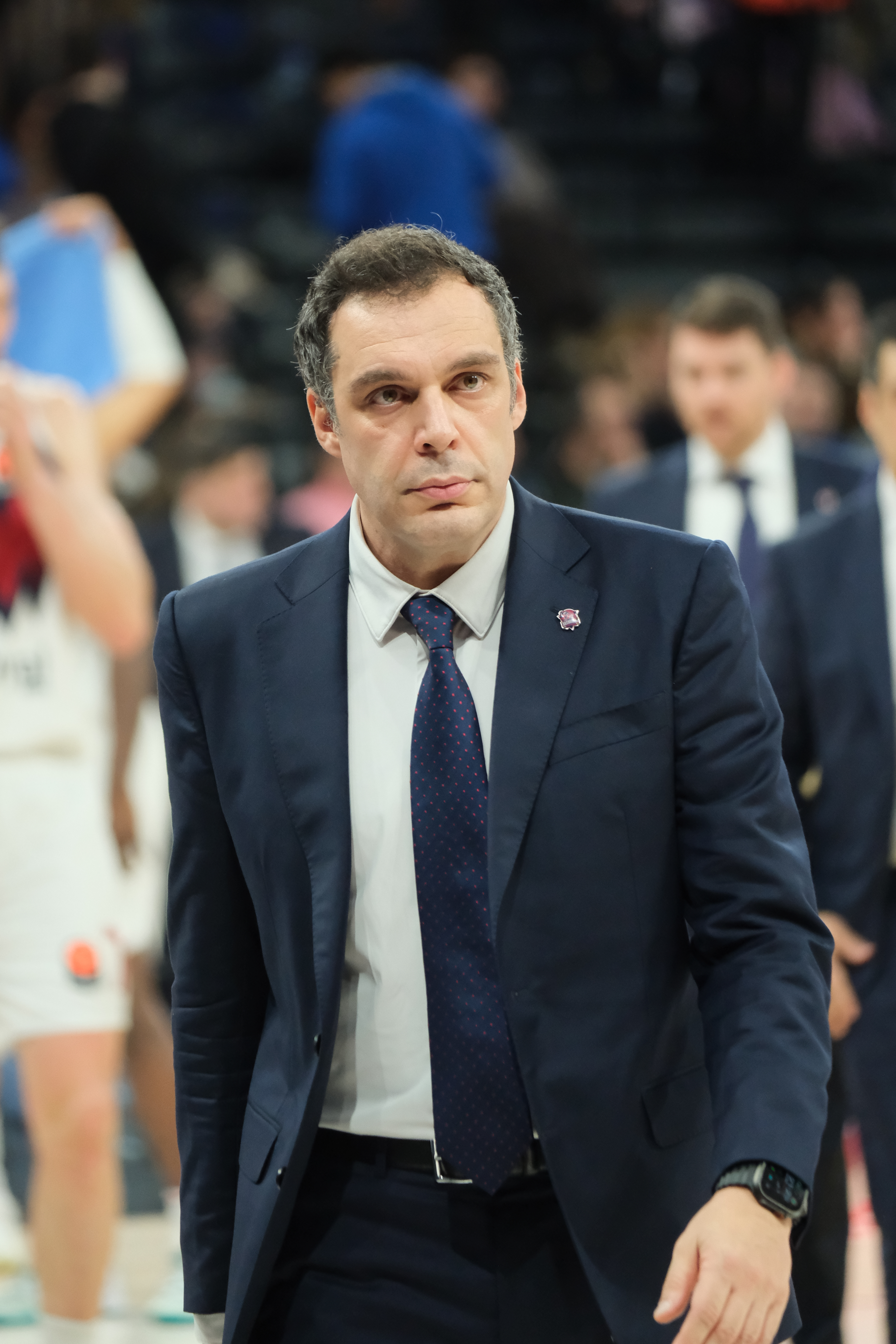
- Galbiati with Baskonia in 2026

Personal information
- Born: February 20, 1984 (age 42) Vimercate, Italy
- Position: Head coach
- Coaching career: 2017–present

Career history

Coaching
- 2017–2018: Auxilium Torino (assistant)
- 2018–2019: Auxilium Torino
- 2019–2020: Biella
- 2020–2022: Vanoli Cremona
- 2022–2023: Varese (assistant)
- 2023–2025: Aquila Trento
- 2025–2026: Baskonia

Career highlights
- 2× Italian Cup winner (2018, 2025); Lega Serie A Coach of the Year (2025); Spanish Cup winner (2026)

Paolo Galbiati (born February 20, 1984) is an Italian professional basketball coach. He has also coached the U20 Italian national team.

== Professional career ==
Galbiati started his basketball coaching career in the youth teams of Bernareggio, Rhinos Robbiate Basket and Olimpia Milano, in which he coached several teams between 2012 and 2017.

His career in professional basketball started when he became an assistant coach for Auxilium Torino of the LBA in 2017. In February 2018, he was named head coach of Torino. He would go on to win the club's first major title, the 2018 Italian Basketball Cup, shortly after taking over as head coach.

In 2019, he became the head coach of Pallacanestro Biella, then playing in the Serie A2. He signed for Vanoli Cremona of the LBA in 2020.

After leaving Cremona in 2022, Galbiati joined Pallacanestro Varese of the LBA as an assistant coach.

=== Aquila Trento (2023–2025) ===
In June 2023, Galbiati became the head coach of Aquila Trento of the LBA and EuroCup. Managing to reach the Serie A playoffs in both seasons with Trento, Galbiati won his second Italian Basketball Cup in 2025.

=== Baskonia (2025–2026) ===
On August 8, 2025, Saski Baskonia of the Spanish Liga ACB and the EuroLeague announced Galbiati as head coach, signing a two-season deal. Galbiati replaced Spanish coach Pablo Laso on the job. On February 22, 2026, Galbiati won the 2026 Copa del Rey with Baskonia, the first for the Basques in 17 years. On October 14, 2026, Baskonia announced Galbiati would not continue as the team's head coach.

== Coaching record ==
Legend
G	Games coached	W	Games won	L	Games lost	W–L %	Win-loss %

Note: The EuroLeague is not the only competition in which the team played during the season. He also coached in domestic competition, and regional competition if applicable.

=== EuroLeague ===
Team	Year	G	W	L	W–L%	Result
Baskonia	2025–26	38	13	25	.342	Eliminated in the regular season
Baskonia	2026–27	5	1	4	.200	Fired
Career		43	14	29	.326	
