= Nobel Boungou Colo =

Congolese-French basketball player

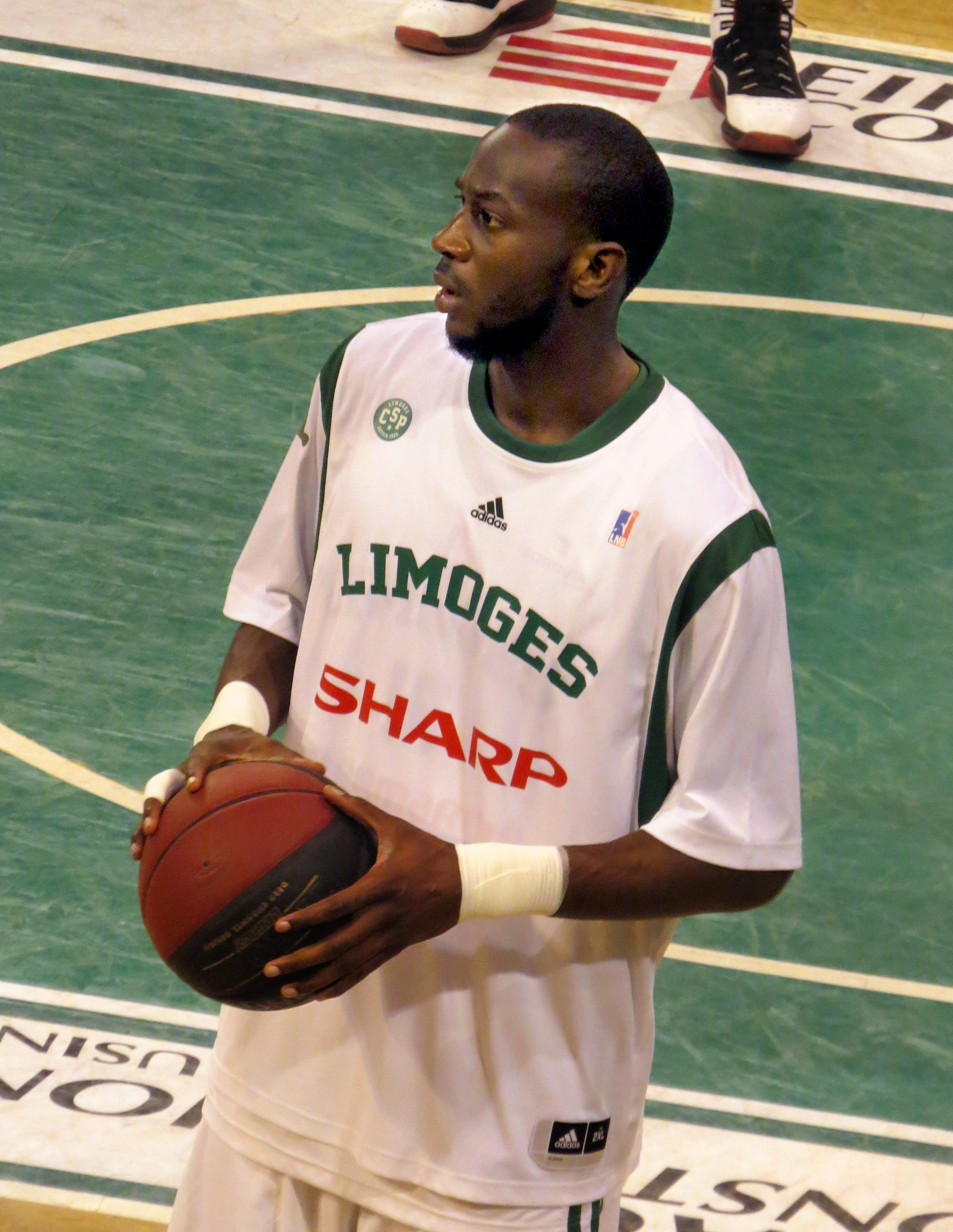
- Boungou Colo with Limoges CSP

No. 16 – Paris Basketball
- Position: Small forward / power forward
- League: LNB Élite

Personal information
- Born: April 26, 1988 (age 38) Brazzaville, People's Republic of the Congo
- Listed height: 2.02 m (6 ft 8 in)
- Listed weight: 90 kg (198 lb)

Career information
- NBA draft: 2010: undrafted
- Playing career: 2007–present

Career history
- 2007–2009: Orléans Loiret
- 2009–2011: Hyères Toulon
- 2011–2012: Le Mans Sarthe
- 2012–2016: Limoges CSP
- 2016–2017: Khimki
- 2017: Real Betis Energía Plus
- 2018–2018: Fiat Torino
- 2019: Joventut
- 2019–2021: Paris Basketball
- 2021: Metropolitans 92
- 2022: Orléans Loiret Basket
- 2022–2026: Antibes Sharks
- 2026–present: Paris Basketball

Career highlights
- Italian Cup champion (2018); 2× LNB Pro A champion (2014, 2015); LNB Pro B champion (2012); Match des Champions winner (2013); 4× French All-Star (2012-2015); LNB All-Star Game MVP (2013)

Dy Nobel Ritchy Boungou Colo (born April 26, 1988) is a Congolese-French professional basketball player for Paris Basketball of the LNB Élite and the EuroLeague. He has represented France internationally.

== Professional career ==
On February 18, 2018, Boungou Colo went to win the 2018 edition of the Italian Basketball Cup with Fiat Torino by beating Germani Basket Brescia 69–67 in the Finals.

On October 2, 2021, he has signed with Metropolitans 92 of the LNB Pro A.

== Career statistics ==
Legend
GP	Games played	GS	Games started	MPG	Minutes per game
FG%	Field-goal percentage	3P%	3-point field-goal percentage	FT%	Free-throw percentage
RPG	Rebounds per game	APG	Assists per game	SPG	Steals per game
BPG	Blocks per game	PPG	Points per game	PIR	Performance index rating
**Bold**	Career high

=== EuroLeague ===
Year	Team	GP	GS	MPG	FG%	3P%	FT%	RPG	APG	SPG	BPG	PPG	PIR
2014–15	Limoges	10	10	27.9	.385	.237	.793	2.8	2.2	1.1	.2	10.2	8.8
2015–16	Limoges	10	9	27.1	.390	.389	.857	3.1	3.0	1.2	.4	8.6	11.1
Career		20	19	27.5	.387	.311	.814	3.0	2.6	1.1	.3	9.4	10.0
