= Deron Washington =

American basketball player (born 1985)

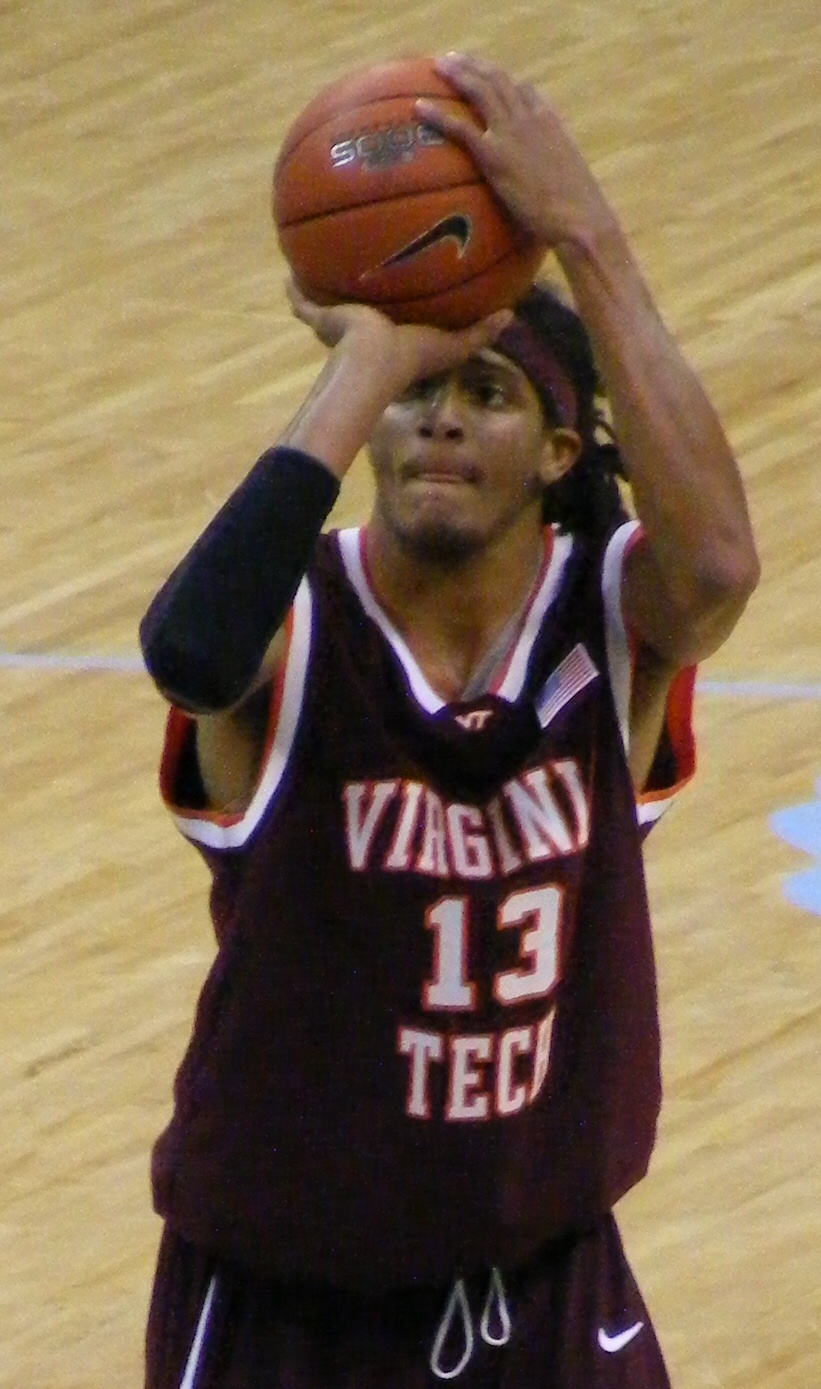
- Washington with Virginia Tech in 2007

Personal information
- Born: December 12, 1985 (age 40) New Orleans, Louisiana, U.S.
- Listed height: 2.03 m (6 ft 8 in)
- Listed weight: 95 kg (209 lb)

Career information
- High school: National Christian Academy (Fort Washington, Maryland)
- College: Virginia Tech (2004–2008)
- NBA draft: 2008: 2nd round, 59th overall pick
- Drafted by: Detroit Pistons
- Playing career: 2008–2021
- Position: Small forward / shooting guard

Career history
- 2008–2009: Hapoel Holon
- 2009: Los Angeles D-Fenders
- 2009–2010: Tulsa 66ers
- 2010–2012: Obradoiro CAB
- 2012–2013: Barak Netanya
- 2013–2015: Giorgio Tesi Pistoia
- 2015: Bnei Herzliya
- 2015–2016: Vanoli Cremona
- 2016–2018: Fiat Torino
- 2018–2019: Reyer Venezia
- 2019–2020: Pallacanestro Trieste
- 2021: Mitteldeutscher

Career highlights
- Italian Cup champion (2018); ACC All-Freshmen team (2005)
- Stats at Basketball Reference

Deron Washington (born December 12, 1985) is an American former professional basketball player who last played for Mitteldeutscher of the German Basketball Bundesliga (BBL). He played in college for the Virginia Tech Hokies men's basketball team. He was selected with the 59th overall selection in the 2008 NBA draft by the Detroit Pistons.

Washington, who attended the National Christian Academy in Fort Washington, Maryland, is the son of Lionel Washington, a former National Football League cornerback and Denise Washington, a former Xavier University of Louisiana women's basketball player.

== High school career ==
After two years at Notre Dame Academy in Green Bay, WI, Deron transferred. At National Academy as a junior, Washington averaged 11.5 points per game and made 65 three-pointers, even while missing nine games in the middle of the year due to a broken wrist. Following his junior year, Washington was rated #87 nationally by HoopScoop and #124 nationally by Rivals.com. He was also rated as the #2 wing forward by MarylandPrepHoops.com.

Washington finished his senior season averaging 16.7 points, 10.0 rebounds, three assists, and three blocks per game for NCA.

Following his high school senior year at National Christian Academy, Washington was rated as a three-star prospect on Rivals.com. He chose to attend Virginia Tech, who had not reached the NCAA tournament since the 1995–1996, and play for newly acquired head coach Seth Greenberg.

== College career ==
=== Freshman season ===
Washington was immediately used in the Hokies' system, starting 30 games in his freshman season. He finished his season second on the team in field goal percentage (47.6) and fourth in rebounding (4.6). He also added 7.9 points per game, 1.0 assists per game, 1.0 blocks per game and 1.0 steals per game.

The Hokies finished the season with 16–14 overall record, and an 8–8 ACC conference record. They lost in the first round of the ACC tournament and were chosen to play in the National Invitational Tournament. They defeated their first opponent Temple, 60–50 and lost to Memphis in the second round, 83–62.

=== Sophomore season ===
In his sophomore season, Washington became the team's fourth leading scoring at 10.5 points per game and third leading rebounder at 5.0 rebounds per game.

His best statistical game came against Mount Saint Mary's University where he made eight of ten field goals, scoring 24 points. He also recorded then-career highs, with ten rebounds, five blocks and three steals.

Virginia Tech finished the season with a 14–16 overall record and 4–12 in the conference. They were eliminated in the first round of the ACC Tournament against the Virginia Cavaliers and were not selected for any post-season tournament.

=== Junior season ===
In his junior season, Washington was the second leading scorer on the team at 12.0 points per game and averaged 6.5 rebounds per game. He averaged 1.2 steals and 1.0 blocks per game.

The Hokies finished the 2006–2007 with a record of 22–12, with an ACC record of 10–6 and earned their first NCAA Tournament bid since the 1995–1996 season.

Virginia Tech earned a #5 seed and were matched up against Illinois in the first round. The Hokies faced a 13-point deficit with just over eight minutes left to play, but came back to win 54–52, keyed by a running bank shot by Washington with 46 seconds remaining. Virginia Tech lost the second-round game against Southern Illinois 63–48.

=== Senior season ===
Washington finished his senior season with career bests in points (13.5 per game), rebounds (6.5 per game) and assists (2.3 per game). The Hokies finished the season 22–14 (9–7). VT was selected for the NIT and reached the quarterfinals, defeating Morgan State 94–62, and UAB 75–49 before losing to Ole Miss 81–72.

=== Statistics ===
Regular season averages
Season	G	GS	PTS	REB	AST	STL	BLK	FG%	3P%	FT%	MIN	TO
2004–05	30	30	7.9	4.6	1.0	1.0	1.0	.476	.600	.600	24.1	1.6
2005–06	29	28	10.5	5.3	1.1	1.6	1.0	.492	.269	.570	31.4	1.6
2006–07	34	32	12.0	5.3	1.5	1.2	1.0	.503	.308	.578	28.0	1.6
2007–08	35	35	13.1	6.5	2.3	1.0	0.6	.416	.269	.671	33.1	2.1
Totals	128	125	11.0	5.4	1.5	1.2	0.8	.468	.286	.616	29.3	1.7

== Professional career ==
Washington was drafted 59th overall by the Detroit Pistons in the second round of the 2008 NBA draft.

He played in Israel for the defending champion Hapoel Holon in the 2008/2009 season, with whom he won the Israeli Basketball State Cup.

Deron played for the Detroit Pistons in the 2009 Summer League to compete for a spot on the roster.

On August 10, 2009, the Pistons signed Washington to a two-year contract. The first year of the deal is partially guaranteed and the second year is a team option.

After playing for the Detroit Pistons of the National Basketball Association at the pre-season, Deron was waived by the Pistons on October 26, 2009. The Pistons opted to keep a 14-man roster instead of 15. On November 5, 2009, he was drafted third overall by the Los Angeles D-Fenders in the 2009 NBA D-League draft.

On December 18, 2009, Washington was traded to the Tulsa 66ers in exchange for forward Keith Clark.

Washington played for the Milwaukee Bucks in the 2010 NBA Summer League.

He was nicknamed "Smash" in the 2012 Orlando Pro Summer League.

On January 9, 2015, he signed with Bnei Herzliya of the Israeli Premier League.

On July 17, 2015, he signed with the Italian club Vanoli Cremona.

For the 2016–17 and 2017–18 LBA seasons he was a player for Fiat Torino. On February 18, 2018, Washington won the 2018 Italian Basketball Cup with Fiat Torino by beating Germani Basket Brescia 69–67 in the Final.

On July 19, 2018, Washington signed a deal with the Italian club Reyer Venezia.

On December 17, 2019, he signed with Pallacanestro Trieste. The 2019–20 season suffered an interruption due to the COVID-19 pandemic and Washington did not play with any team until the end of the 2020 year.

On February 23, 2021, he was signed in Germany by Mitteldeutscher BC.
