= Lee Moore (basketball) =

American basketball player (born 1995)

Heroes Den Bosch
- Position: Shooting guard
- League: BNXT League

Personal information
- Born: August 9, 1995 (age 31) Marietta, Georgia
- Listed height: 1.93 m (6 ft 4 in)
- Listed weight: 79 kg (174 lb)

Career information
- High school: North Cobb (Kennesaw, Georgia)
- College: Wallace State CC (2013–2015); UTEP (2015–2016)
- NBA draft: 2017: undrafted
- Playing career: 2016–present

Career history
- 2016–2018: Brescia
- 2018–2019: Mitteldeutscher BC
- 2019–2020: AD Atenas
- 2020–2021: MKS Dąbrowa Górnicza
- 2021–2022: Brescia
- 2022: Sokół Łańcut
- 2022–2023: Anwil Włocławek
- 2023–present: Heroes Den Bosch

Career highlights
- FIBA Europe Cup champion (2023); All-PLK Team (2021)

Lee Moore (born August 9, 1995) is an American professional basketball player for Heroes Den Bosch of the BNXT League. He played college basketball at Wallace State Community College and the University of Texas at El Paso before playing professionally in Italy, Argentina, Germany and Poland.

== College career ==
After suiting up for North Cobb High School in Kennesaw, Georgia, Moore spent his freshman and sophomore seasons (2013–14, 2014–15) at Wallace State Community College in Hanceville, Alabama. He transferred to the University of Texas at El Paso for his junior year. In his single season at UTEP (2015–16), Moore led the Miners in scoring at 15.4 points per contest, while pulling down 5.4 rebounds, dishing out 3.5 assists and snagging 1.4 steals a game. In April 2016, he announced his decision to skip his senior year and turn pro.

== Professional career ==
On September 14, 2016, Moore started his professional career in Italy, signing with Brescia of the country’s highest-tier league Lega Basket Serie A. He made 30 appearances for Brescia in his 2016-17 rookie season, averaging 13.0 points (season-high 26 points), 5.2 rebounds and 2.1 assists per game. Moore led Brescia to the 2018 Italian Cup Final, where they eventually lost to Torino.

On December 17, 2017, Moore recorded a career-high 28 points, shooting 8-of-12 from the field, along with five rebounds and six assists in a 90–71 win over Reyer Venezia. He finished his second season with Brescia averaging 9.5 points, 4.1 rebounds and 1.4 assists per game.

On September 13, 2018, Moore signed with Mitteldeutscher BC of the German Basketball Bundesliga (BBL). In 32 games played for Mitteldeutscher, he averaged 10.6 points, 4.4 rebounds, 2.6 assists and 1.2 steals per game.

On August 28, 2019, Moore signed a one-year deal with Maccabi Hod HaSharon of the Israeli National League, replacing Chad Frazier. On October 24, 2019, he parted ways with Hod HaSharon before appearing in a game for them.

Moore played for Atenas in the Argentine league and averaged 11.6 points and 4.6 rebounds per game. He signed with MKS Dąbrowa Górnicza of the Polish Basketball League (PLK) on March 6, 2020. On July 6, 2021, he returned to Brescia.

On August 6, 2022, he has signed with Sokół Łańcut of the PLK.

On October 28, 2022, he has signed with Anwil Włocławek of the Polish Basketball League. On September 23, 2022, Moore signed with Heroes Den Bosch of the BNXT League.
