= Giuseppe Poeta =

Italian basketball player (born 1985)

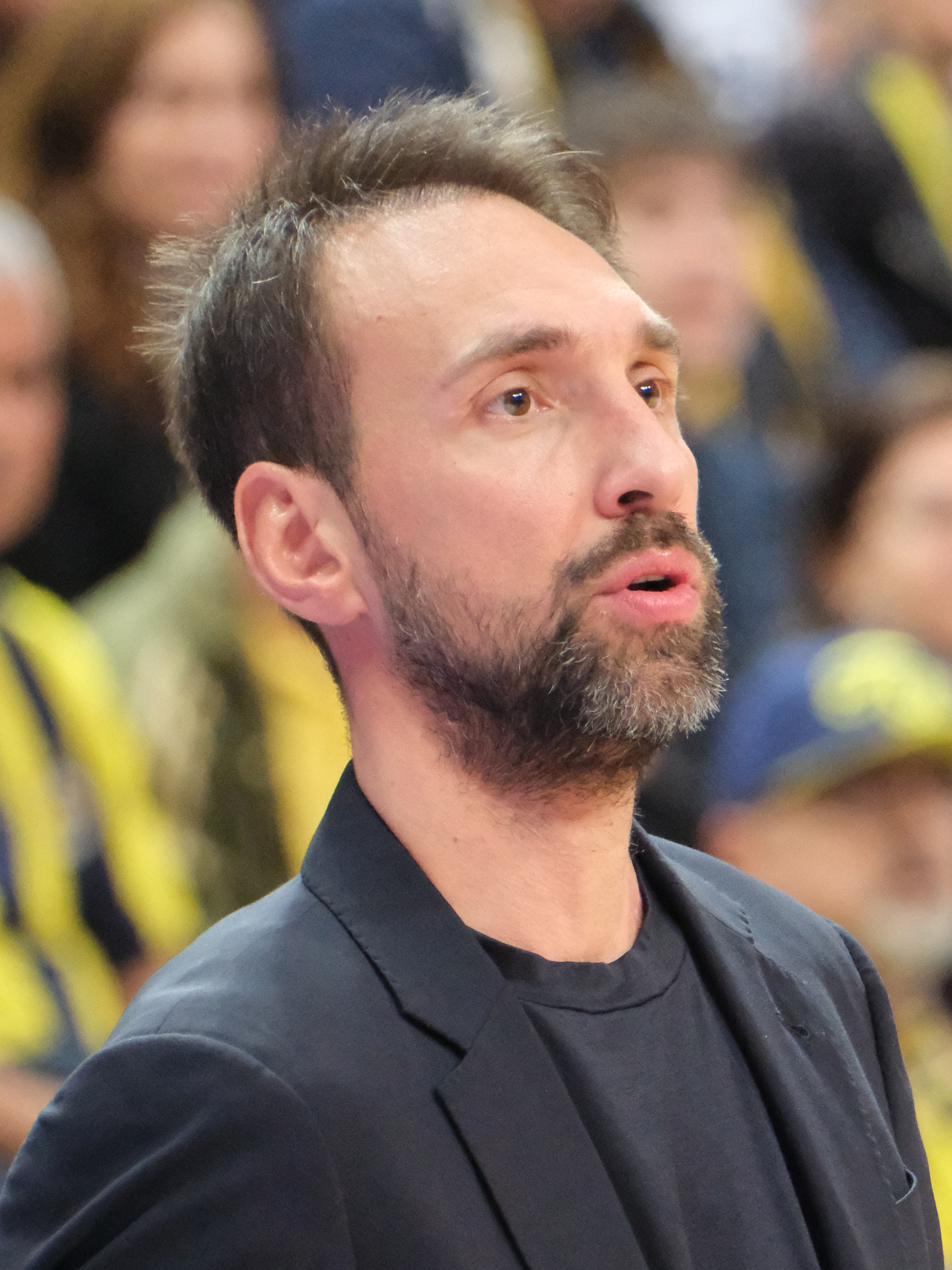
- Poeta as Olimpia Milano's head coach in 2026

Personal information
- Born: September 12, 1985 (age 41) Battipaglia, Italy
- Listed height: 1.90 m (6 ft 3 in)
- Listed weight: 82 kg (181 lb)

Career information
- NBA draft: 2007: undrafted
- Playing career: 2000–2022
- Position: Point guard

Career history

Playing
- 2000–2005: Salerno
- 2005–2006: Veroli
- 2006–2010: Teramo
- 2010–2013: Virtus Bologna
- 2014: Baskonia
- 2014–2015: Manresa
- 2015–2016: Aquila Trento
- 2016–2019: Auxilium Torino
- 2019–2020: Reggiana
- 2020–2022: Vanoli Cremona

Coaching
- 2022–2024: Olimpia Milano (assistant)
- 2022–2025: Italy (assistant)
- 2024–2025: Brescia
- 2025: Olimpia Milano (assistant)
- 2025–2026: Olimpia Milano

Career highlights
- As player: Italian Cup winner (2018); LBA assists leader (2021); LBA All-Star (2012); As head coach: Lega Serie A champion (2026); Italian Cup winner (2026); Italian Supercup winner (2026); As assistant coach: 2× Lega Serie A champion (2023, 2024); Italian Supercup winner (2025)

Giuseppe "Peppe" Poeta (born September 12, 1985) is an Italian professional basketball coach and former player who last worked as the head coach of Olimpia Milano of the Italian Lega Basket Serie A and the Euroleague. As a player he played at the point guard position.

== Professional career ==
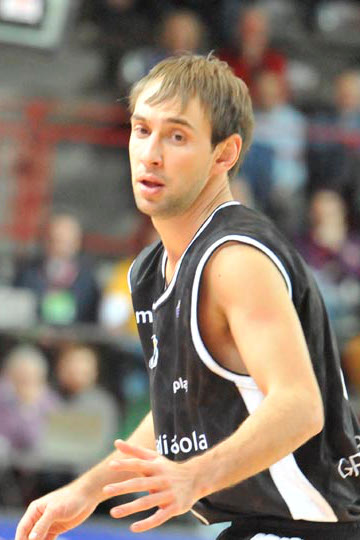
Poeta playing for Virtus Bologna in 2010

Poeta joined local club Pallacanestro Salerno in the lower divisions, playing 5 seasons before joining Prima Veroli of the third division. With Veroli he scored 51 points in a 7 November 2005 114–105 victory against Forlì.

He moved to first division Serie A club Teramo Basket in 2006. During the 2008-09 season he led the team, coached by former Salerno coach Andrea Capobianco (in Italian), to the league play-offs.

He then joined Virtus Bologna where he had two successful seasons, reaching the play-offs twice and being appointed captain. However, after a difficult 2012-13 season where the team finished two places above last place the management decided to change the side, appointing young Matteo Imbrò (in Italian) as the starting point guard. Poeta found himself frozen out of the team, rescinding his contract in November 2013.

It was to prove a blessing in disguise as it allowed him to join Laboral Kutxa Vitoria, a team playing in the competitive Liga ACB and Europe's elite EuroLeague, as Thomas Heurtel's substitute.

His debut for the side on 12 January 2014 saw him score 13 points in the last quarter against Gipuzkoa to earn a victory.

He joined another Liga ACB side for the 2014–15 season, signing with La Bruixa d'Or Manresa. However, an injury that kept him sidelined for most of the season would see him play only six games.

In July 2015, Poeta returned to Italy, signing a one-year deal with Dolomiti Energia Trento.

On 29 June 2016, Poeta signed with Auxilium Torino for the 2016–17 season.

On February 18, 2018, Poeta went to win the 2018 edition of the Italian Basketball Cup with Fiat Torino by beating Germani Basket Brescia 69–67 in the Finals.

On June 24, 2019, he has signed with Reggio Emilia of the Italian Lega Basket Serie A (LBA).

However, at the end of the season Reggio Emilia and Poeta parted ways, and on August 5, 2020, he signed a 1+1 contract with Vanoli Cremona.

== International career ==
After being called up for the first time in 2007, Poeta established himself in the Italian national team fold.

He was part of the Italy squad for EuroBasket 2013 though he had a limited impact, with 4 points in less than 6 minutes on average.

Poeta was called up to the preliminary Italy squad for EuroBasket 2015, but he did not make the final cut.

== Coaching career ==
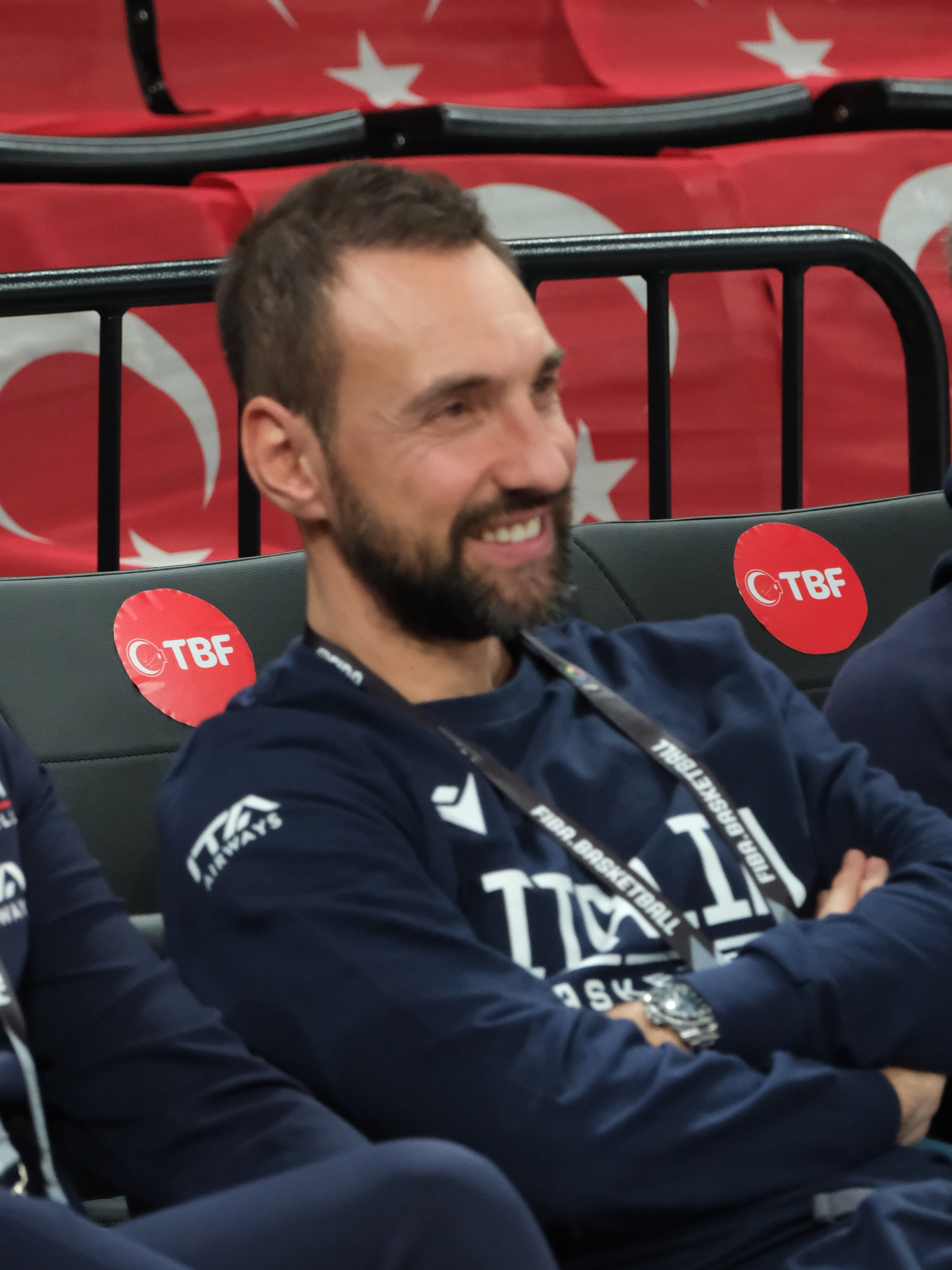
Poeta as Italy's assistant coach in 2025

From the summer of 2022 he joined Coach Ettore Messina's staff at Olimpia Milano with whom he won the scudetto in 2023 and 2024. As a coach, he is also assistant to the Italy with which he participated in the 2022 European Championships, at the 2023 World Cup and currently together with CT Pozzecco he is preparing the expedition that will take part in the Pre-Olympic which will be held in Puerto Rico from 2 to 7 July.

On June 17, 2024, he started his head coaching career by signing Germani Brescia of the Italian Lega Basket Serie A (LBA). He led the team to reach the 2025 LBA Finals during the 2025 playoffs where the team beats Trieste 3–1 in the quarterfinals and the second-seeded Trapani Shark 3–2 in the semifinals, which the team did reached the finals for the first time ever until they lost to Virtus Bologna in three games.

== Personal ==
His first participation in basketball was as a scorekeeper for home town club Polisportiva Battipagliese where his father Franco was a press officer. He later played for the team at youth level.
