= Vander Blue =

American basketball player (born 1992)

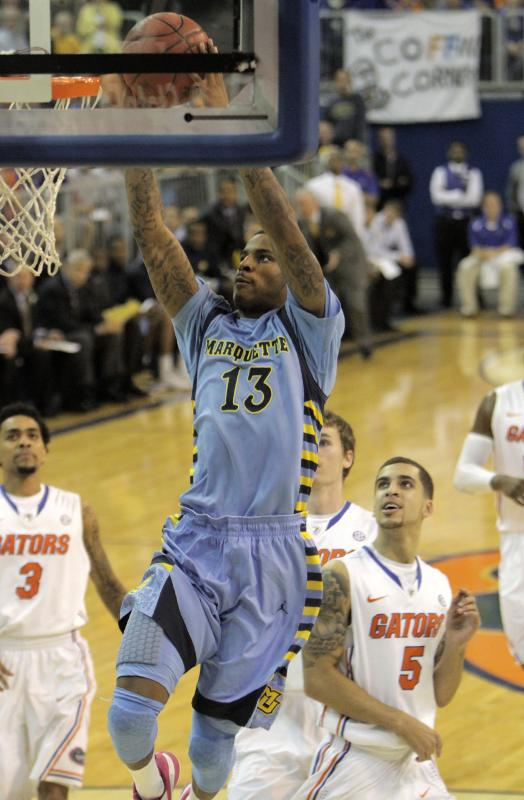
- Blue with Marquette in 2012

Free agent
- Position: Shooting guard

Personal information
- Born: July 17, 1992 (age 34) Milwaukee, Wisconsin, U.S.
- Listed height: 6 ft 4 in (1.93 m)
- Listed weight: 196 lb (89 kg)

Career information
- High school: Memorial (Madison, Wisconsin)
- College: Marquette (2010–2013)
- NBA draft: 2013: undrafted
- Playing career: 2013–present

Career history
- 2013: Maccabi Rishon LeZion
- 2014: Delaware 87ers
- 2014: Boston Celtics
- 2014: →Maine Red Claws
- 2014: Idaho Stampede
- 2014–2017: Los Angeles D-Fenders
- 2015: Los Angeles Lakers
- 2016: Guangxi Rhinos
- 2017–2018: Los Angeles Lakers
- 2017–2018: →South Bay Lakers
- 2018: Auxilium Torino
- 2018–2019: Wisconsin Herd
- 2019: Texas Legends
- 2019: Santa Cruz Warriors
- 2021–2022: Libertadores de Querétaro
- 2021–2022: Club Atlético Peñarol
- 2022–2023: Al Sadd Doha
- 2024: Ángeles de la Ciudad de México
- 2024: El Calor de Cancún
- 2025: Correbasket UAT
- 2025–2026: Hangtuah Jakarta

Career highlights
- LNBP West District MVP (2021); LNBP All-Star (2022); LNBP scoring champion (2021); Italian Cup MVP (2018); Italian Cup champion (2018); NBA D-League MVP (2017); 2× All-NBA D-League First Team (2016, 2017); 3× NBA D-League All-Star (2015–2017); Second-team All-Big East (2013)
- Stats at NBA.com
- Stats at Basketball Reference
Medals
Men's basketball
Representing the United States
FIBA Americas U18 Championship
Gold medal – first place	2010 San Antonio	Team

Vander Lee Blue II (born July 17, 1992) is an American professional basketball player who last played for the Hangtuah Jakarta of the Indonesian Basketball League (IBL). He played college basketball for the Marquette Golden Eagles of the Big East Conference.

== College career ==
Blue, a 6'4" shooting guard from Madison, Wisconsin, originally committed to the University of Wisconsin, but received press coverage as he decommitted after becoming disenchanted by negative posts on Wisconsin Badgers internet blogs. Blue ended up enrolling at Marquette for the 2010–11 season. Blue was a key rotation player as a freshman and sophomore, and stepped into a starting role in his junior season. He averaged 14.8 points per game and was named second team All-Big East Conference.

After the season, Blue bypassed his senior season and declared his eligibility for the 2013 NBA draft.

== Professional career ==
=== Maccabi Rishon LeZion (2013) ===
After going undrafted in the 2013 NBA draft, Blue joined the Houston Rockets for the Orlando Summer League and the Memphis Grizzlies for the Las Vegas Summer League. On September 27, 2013, he signed with the Philadelphia 76ers. However, he was later waived by the 76ers on October 25 after appearing in five preseason games. Five days later, Blue signed with Maccabi Rishon LeZion of the Israeli Super League. On December 31, 2013, he was released by Maccabi after appearing in just seven games.

=== Delaware 87ers (2014) ===
On January 14, 2014, Blue was acquired by the Delaware 87ers of the NBA Development League.

=== Boston Celtics (2014) ===
On January 22, 2014, Blue signed a 10-day contract with the Boston Celtics. He made his NBA debut later that day, recording 2 points, 2 rebounds and 1 assist in a 113–111 win over the Washington Wizards. On January 31, he was assigned to the Maine Red Claws. The Celtics did not offer Blue a second 10-day contract after his first 10-day contract expired, thus parting ways with both the Celtics and Red Claws. On February 1, he was reacquired by the 87ers.

=== Idaho Stampede (2014) ===
On March 7, Blue was traded to the Idaho Stampede in a four-team deal, and played out the rest of the 2013–14 season with the team. Blue appeared in 27 D-League games for three teams in 2013–14, averaging 16.8 points, 4.4 rebounds, 2.9 assists and 1.3 steals per game.

=== Los Angeles D-Fenders (2014–2015) ===
In July 2014, Blue joined the San Antonio Spurs for the 2014 NBA Summer League. On September 29, 2014, he signed with the Washington Wizards. However, he was later waived by the Wizards on October 3. On October 30, he was reacquired by the Idaho Stampede. The next day, he was traded to the Los Angeles D-Fenders in exchange for a second round pick (36th overall) in the 2014 NBA Development League Draft. On February 12, 2015, he was named to the Futures All-Star team for the 2015 NBA D-League All-Star Game as a replacement for Jordan Hamilton.

=== Los Angeles Lakers (2015) ===
On April 13, 2015, Blue signed with the Los Angeles Lakers to help the team deal with numerous injuries. The Lakers had to use an NBA hardship exemption in order to sign him as he made their roster stand at 16, one over the allowed limited of 15. Due to the severe lack of guard depth, in the two games he played for the Lakers, he logged 26 and 48 minutes respectively.

=== Second stint with the D-Fenders (2015–2016) ===
In July 2015, Blue joined the Chicago Bulls for the 2015 NBA Summer League. On October 31, he was reacquired by the Los Angeles D-Fenders. On January 29, he was named in the West All-Star team for the 2016 NBA D-League All-Star Game, earning his second straight All-Star nod. At the season's end, he was named to the All-NBA D-League First Team.

=== Guangxi Rhinos (2016) ===
In July 2016, Blue joined the Dallas Mavericks for the 2016 NBA Summer League. The following month, he had a one-game stint in China with the Guangxi Rhinos.

=== Third stint with the D-Fenders (2016–2017) ===
Blue returned to the US and re-joined the Los Angeles D-Fenders on October 30, 2016. On February 6, 2017, he was named in the Western Conference All-Star team for the 2017 NBA D-League All-Star Game, earning his third straight All-Star nod. On April 24, 2017, he was named the recipient of the NBA Development League Most Valuable Player Award for the 2016–17 season. He ranked third in the league in scoring with 24.8 points per game and added 5.1 rebounds, 3.0 assists and a team-high 1.6 steals in 47 games (46 starts). He was twice named Player of the Week during the season and helped the D-Fenders finish tied for the best record in the Western Conference at 34–16. Blue scored at least 30 points 10 times and reached the 40-point mark twice. On March 29, he made 23 free throws, an NBA D-League-record alongside seven rebounds and five steals, defeating the Reno Bighorns 139–132.

=== Return to the Lakers (2017–2018) ===
On August 4, 2017, Blue signed with the Los Angeles Lakers, returning to the franchise for a second stint. He was waived on October 14 as one of the team's final preseason roster cuts. On October 18, 2017, he signed a two-way contract with the Los Angeles Lakers. Under the terms of the deal, he split time between the Lakers and their NBA G League affiliate, the South Bay Lakers. On January 12, 2018, he was waived by the Lakers.

=== Auxilium Torino (2018) ===
On February 2, 2018, Blue signed with Italian club Auxilium Torino for the rest of the 2017–18 season.

Blue went to win the 2018 edition of the Italian Basketball Cup with Fiat Torino by beating Germani Basket Brescia 69–67 in the Finals. Blue was named Finals MVP of the competition recording 11 points, two rebounds, and three assists.

=== Wisconsin Herd (2018–2019) ===
Blue joined the Wisconsin Herd of the G League when the team acquired his league rights from South Bay on November 16.

=== Texas Legends (2019) ===
On January 24, 2019, Blue was traded to the Texas Legends for the returning player rights to Damon Lynn and a 2019 NBA G League second round pick.

=== Santa Cruz Warriors (2019) ===
Blue joined the Santa Cruz Warriors in 2019. He was waived by the Warriors on December 12, after averaging 8.6 points, 2.4 rebounds and 1.5 assists per game.

=== Libertadores de Querétaro (2021) ===
On March 8, 2020, Blue signed with Golden Eagle Ylli of the Kosovo Basketball Superleague.

On August 18, 2021, Blue signed with Libertadores de Querétaro of the Liga Nacional de Baloncesto Profesional (LNBP).

=== Peñarol (2021) ===
On February 19, 2021, Blue signed with Club Atlético Peñarol of the Liga Uruguaya de Basketball.

=== Libertadores de Querétaro (2022) ===
In August 2022, Blue returned to the Libertadores de Querétaro for the 2022 season. He earned LNBP All-Star honors.

=== Ángeles de la Ciudad de México (2024) ===
In January 2024, Blue signed with the Ángeles de la Ciudad de México, an expansion team in the Circuito de Baloncesto de la Costa del Pacífico (CIBACOPA).

== NBA career statistics ==
Legend
GP	Games played	GS	Games started	MPG	Minutes per game
FG%	Field goal percentage	3P%	3-point field goal percentage	FT%	Free throw percentage
RPG	Rebounds per game	APG	Assists per game	SPG	Steals per game
BPG	Blocks per game	PPG	Points per game	**Bold**	Career high

=== Regular season ===
Year	Team	GP	GS	MPG	FG%	3P%	FT%	RPG	APG	SPG	BPG	PPG
2013–14	Boston	3	0	5.0	**.500**	.000	.200	1.0	.3	.0	.0	1.7
2014–15	L.A. Lakers	2	**1**	**37.0**	.300	**.200**	.400	**4.5**	**4.0**	**1.5**	.0	**11.0**
2017–18	L.A. Lakers	**5**	0	9.0	.200	.000	**.500**	.2	.6	.2	.0	.6
Career		10	1	13.4	.308	.154	.333	1.3	1.2	.4	.0	3.0

== See also ==
- List of NBA G League career scoring leaders
