= Trevor Mbakwe =

American basketball player (born 1989)

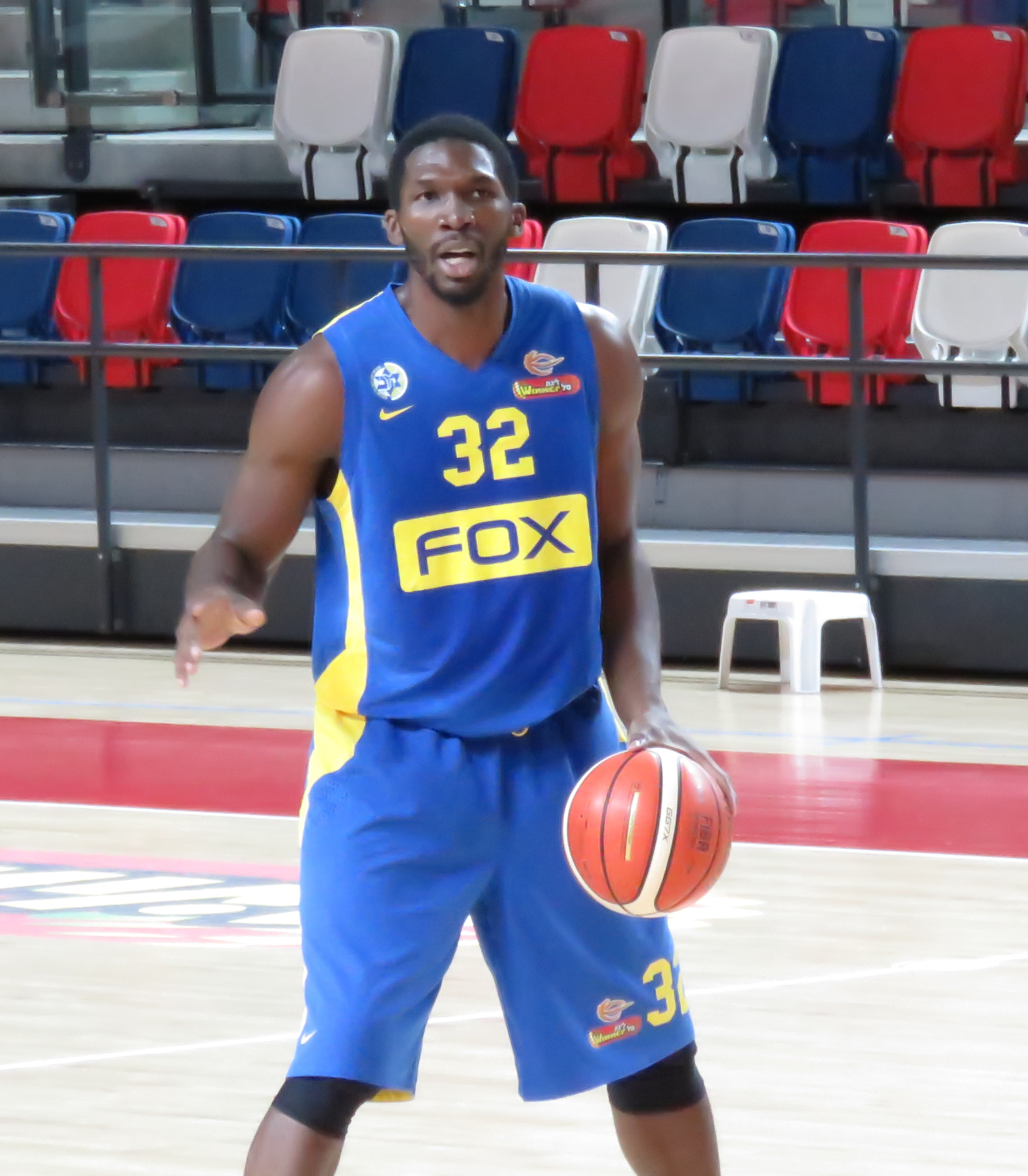
- Mbakwe with Maccabi Tel Aviv in 2015

Personal information
- Born: January 24, 1989 (age 37) Saint Paul, Minnesota, U.S.
- Listed height: 6 ft 8 in (2.03 m)
- Listed weight: 252 lb (114 kg)

Career information
- High school: Sibley (Mendota Heights, Minnesota); Saint Bernard's (Saint Paul, Minnesota)
- College: Marquette (2008); Miami Dade College (2008–2009); Minnesota (2010–2013)
- NBA draft: 2013: undrafted
- Playing career: 2013–2019
- Position: Center
- Coaching career: 2020–present

Career history

Playing
- 2013–2014: Virtus Roma
- 2014–2015: Bamberg
- 2015–2016: Maccabi Tel Aviv
- 2016–2017: Zenit
- 2017–2018: Auxilium Torino
- 2018: Riesen Ludwigsburg
- 2019: Osaka Evessa
- 2019: AEK Athens

Coaching
- 2020–present: Benilde-St. Margaret's (assistant)

Career highlights
- Italian Cup champion (2018); Bundesliga champion (2015); 2× Second-team All-Big Ten – Media (2011, 2013); Third-team All-Big Ten – Coaches (2013)
- Stats at Basketball Reference

Trevor Mbakwe (born January 24, 1989) is an American professional basketball coach and former player. Before turning pro, he played for the Minnesota Golden Gophers men's basketball team. Mbakwe stands 6 feet 8 inches (203 cm) tall. He is from St. Paul, Minnesota and attended St. Bernards High School.

== Collegiate career ==
Before attending the University of Minnesota, Mbakwe played at Marquette University for the 2007–08 season where he suffered from chronic knee injuries. For his 2008–09 season, he transferred to Miami Dade College and led his team to the Southern Conference Championship. After redshirting in 2009–10, Mbakwe transferred to the University of Minnesota to play under head coach Tubby Smith. In his first year playing for Smith, he led the Big Ten Conference in rebounding at 10.5 rebounds per game. He was the first player for the Gophers since Kris Humphries to lead the Big Ten in rebounding, and also became number three on the all time rebounding list at the University of Minnesota when he collected 327 rebounds that season.

== Professional career ==
In July 2013, Mbakwe signed his first professional contract with the Italian team Virtus Roma. On August 22, 2013, it was officially confirmed that he signed contract for the 2013–14 season.

On July 6, 2014, he signed with the German club Brose Baskets for the 2014–15 season.

On July 1, 2015, he signed a three-year contract with the Israeli club Maccabi Tel Aviv. After one season, he parted ways with Maccabi.

On July 6, 2016, Mbakwe signed a one-year deal with Spanish club Unicaja. Two months later, the club rescinded his contract after he did not pass his medical test.

On November 3, 2016, he signed with Russian club Zenit Saint Petersburg. On June 6, 2017, Zenit announced the end of their cooperation with Mbakwe.

Mbakwe signed with Fiat Torino of the Lega Basket Serie A and EuroCup on July 27, 2017. On February 18, 2018, Mbakwe went to win the 2018 edition of the Italian Basketball Cup with Fiat Torino by beating Germani Basket Brescia 69–67 in the Finals. On September 26, 2018, Mbakwe signed with MHP Riesen Ludwigsburg of the Basketball Bundesliga. On April 25, 2019, Mbakwe signed with AEK Athens for the Greek Basket League playoffs, after a brief stint in Japan with Osaka Evessa.

== Coaching career ==
On June 12, 2020, Mbakwe was named as assistant coach at Benilde-St. Margaret's High School.

== Career statistics ==
=== Domestic leagues ===
Season	Team	League	GP	MPG	FG%	3P%	FT%	RPG	APG	SPG	BPG	PPG
2013–14	Acea Roma	Lega A	37	28.2	.589	1.000	.771	10.1	.5	.6	1.5	10.6
2014–15	Brose Baskets	German BBL	41	23.6	.676	–	.816	7.2	1.0	.6	1.4	10.3
2018–19	A.E.K.	GBL	13	14.3	.560	–	.467	3.2	.3	.5	.3	2.7
