= Charles Thomas (basketball, born 1986) =

American basketball player (born 1986)

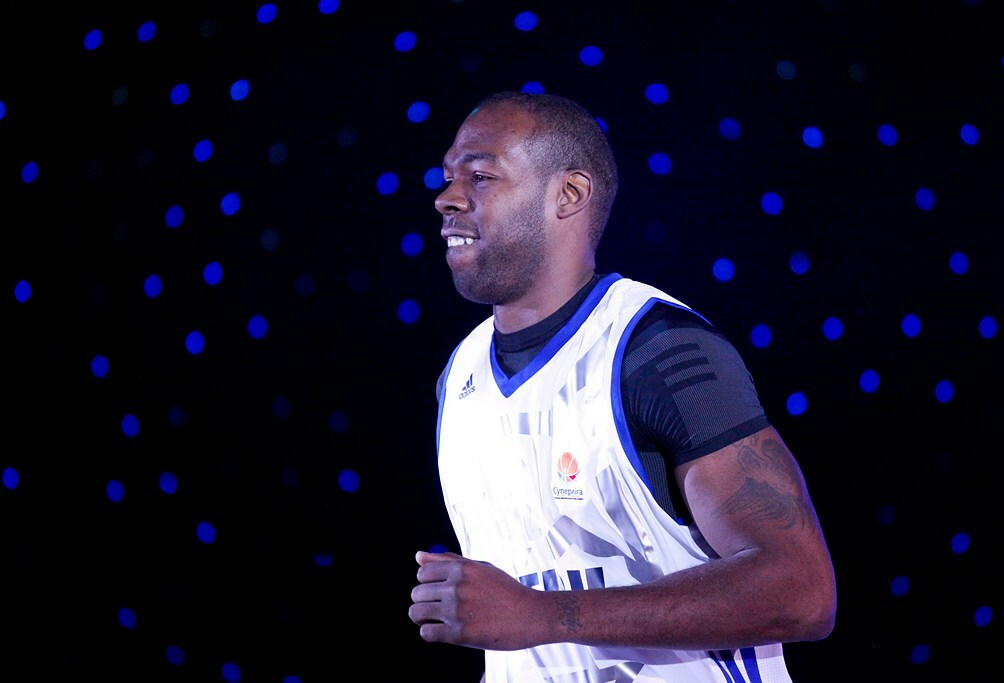
- Thomas at the Ukrainian League All-Star game in February 2012

No. 21 – Corrientes
- Position: Power forward / center

Personal information
- Born: January 21, 1986 (age 40) Jackson, Mississippi
- Listed height: 2.03 m (6 ft 8 in)
- Listed weight: 102 kg (225 lb)

Career information
- High school: Callaway (Jackson, Mississippi)
- College: Arkansas (2004–2008)
- NBA draft: 2008: undrafted
- Playing career: 2008–present

Career history
- 2008: Atletico Biguá
- 2008: Forssan Koripojat
- 2008–2009: Široki Eronet
- 2009–2010: Ferro-ZNTU
- 2010–2011: Azovmash
- 2011–2012: Dnipro
- 2012–2013: Cherkaski Mavpy
- 2013: Chorale Roanne
- 2013–2014: Sagesse Beirut
- 2014: ASU Sports Club
- 2014: Lukoil Academic
- 2015: Sagesse
- 2015–2016: Maccabi Ashdod
- 2016–2017: Maccabi Rishon LeZion
- 2017–2018: Pallacanestro Cantù
- 2019: Legnano Knights
- 2019: Trotamundos
- 2019–2020: Ravenna
- 2020–2021: Givova Scafati
- 2021–2022: Hermine Nantes Basket
- 2022–present: Peñarol

Career highlights
- Bosnian League champion (2009); Ukrainian Cup winner (2010); Ukrainian League MVP (2010); 2× Ukrainian League All-Star (2010, 2012); Israeli League All-Star (2017)

Corrientes 2023–2025 Corrientes Argentina 2023–present Charles Price Thomas III (born January 21, 1986) is an American professional basketball player for Peñarol of the LUB. He played college basketball for the University of Arkansas before playing professionally in Uruguay, Bosnia, Ukraine, France, Lebanon, Jordan, Bulgaria, Israel, Italy and Venezuela.

== Early life and college career ==
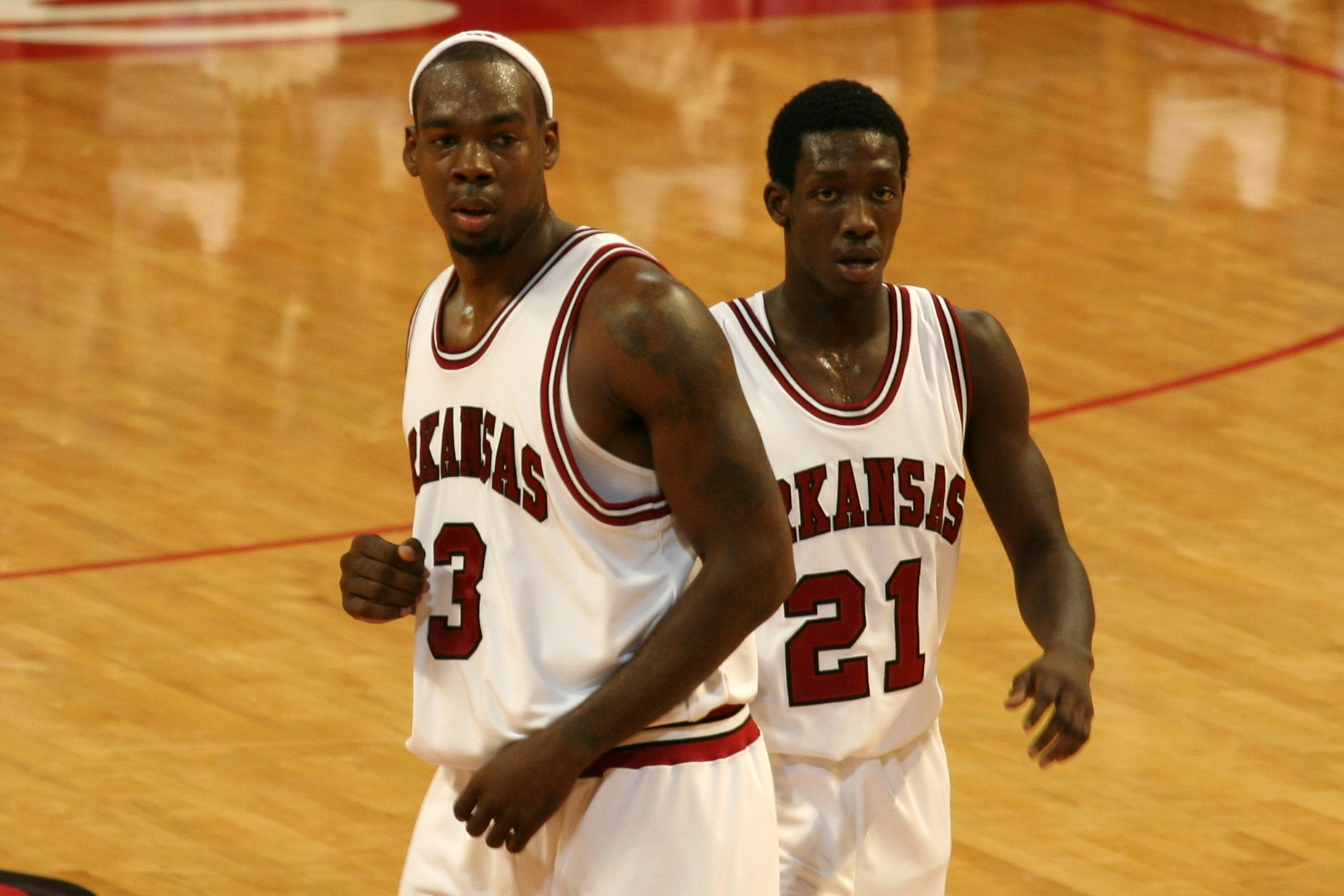
Thomas (left) and Patrick Beverley playing for Arkansas in October 2006

Thomas attended Callaway High School in Jackson, Mississippi. He played college basketball for the University of Arkansas, where he averaged 9.2 points, 4.4 rebounds and 1.3 assists per game in his senior year. Thomas earned a spot in the 2008 SEC All-Tournament Team.

== Professional career ==
=== Atletico Biguá / Široki (2008–2009) ===
In 2008, Thomas started his professional career with the Uruguayan team Atletico Biguá. Later that season he joined the Bosnian team Široki Eronet. Thomas won the 2009 Bosnian League Championship with Široki.

=== Ferro-ZNTU (2009–2010) ===
In 2009, Thomas joined the Ukrainian team Ferro-ZNTU for the 2009–10 season. Thomas averaged 20 points and 10.2 rebounds per game. Thomas won the 2010 Ukrainian Cup with Ferro-ZNTU, while earning the Ukrainian League MVP honors.

=== Azovmash (2010–2011) ===
On July 8, 2010, Thomas signed a one-year deal with Azovmash. Thomas helped Azovmash reach the 2011 Ukrainian Cup Finals, where they eventually lost to Dnipro.

=== Dnipro (2011–2012) ===
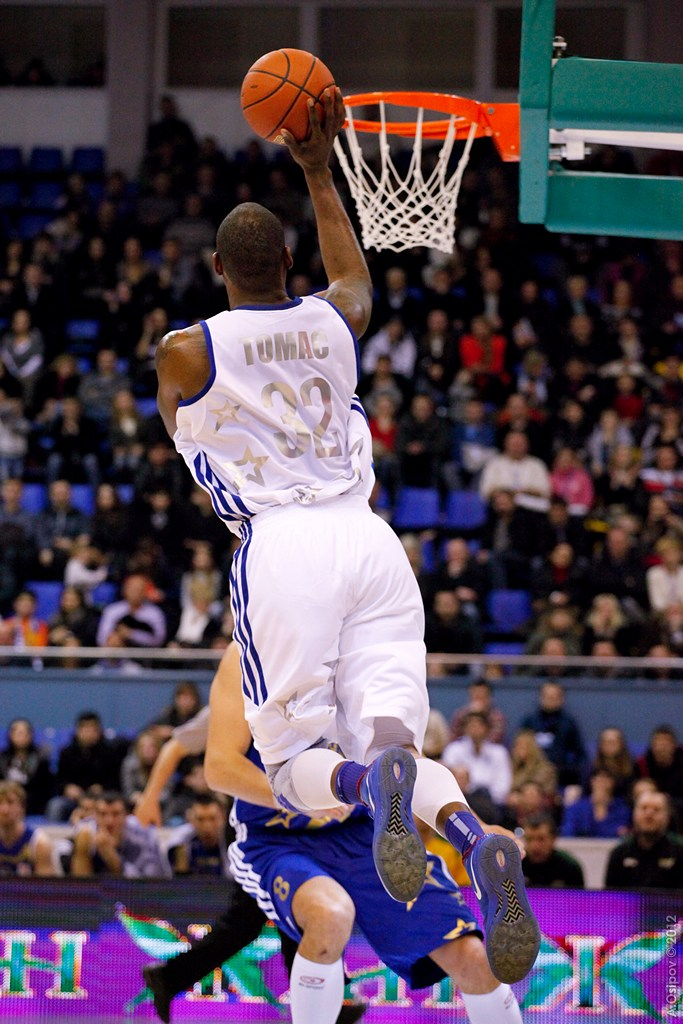
Thomas at the Ukrainian League All-Star game in February 2012

In 2012, Thomas joined Dnipro for the 2011–12 season. On November 23, 2011, Thomas recorded a season-high 30 points, shooting 11-of-17 from the field, along with seven rebounds and three assists in an 83–70 win over his former team Ferro-ZNTU.

=== Cherkaski Mavpy (2012–2013) ===
On August 9, 2012, Thomas signed a one-year deal with Cherkaski Mavpy. Thomas finished the season as the League fifth-leading scorer with 16.9 points per game. Thomas helped the team reach the 2013 Ukrainian League Quarterfinals, where they eventually were eliminated by Ferro-ZNTU.

=== Roanne / Sagesse / ASU Sports Club (2013–2014) ===
On June 23, 2013, Thomas signed with the French team Chorale Roanne for the 2013–14 season. However, on November 7, 2013, he parted ways with Roanne after appearing in five games.

On December 24, 2013, Thomas signed a one-year deal with the Lebanese team Sagesse Beirut.

On May 16, 2014, Thomas signed with the Jordanian team ASU Sports Club for the rest of the season.

=== Lukoil Academic / Return to Sagesse (2014–2015) ===
On August 7, 2014, Thomas signed a one-year deal with the Bulgarian team Lukoil Academic. However, on December 30, 2014, he parted ways with the team after appearing in 16 games for them.

On January 16, 2015, Thomas returned to Sagesse Beirut for a second stint. In 7 games played for Sagesse, he averaged 17.7 points, 6.6 rebounds and 1.9 assists.

=== Maccabi Ashdod (2015–2016) ===
On March 31, 2015, Thomas signed with the Israeli team Maccabi Ashdod for the rest of the season.

On July 24, 2015, Thomas re-signed with Ashdod for the 2015–16 season. On February 4, 2016, Thomas was named Israeli League Player of the Month for games played in January. On February 24, 2016, Thomas recorded a double-double of 33 points and 10 rebounds, shooting 13-of-15 from the field, along with two steals and two blocks in an 86–84 win over Maccabi Rishon LeZion.

In his second season with Ashdod, Thomas finished the season as the league second-leading scorer with 19.1 points, while also averaging 5.2 rebounds, 1.7 assists and 1.1 steals per game. Thomas helped Ashdod reach the 2016 Israeli State Cup Final, where they eventually lost Maccabi Tel Aviv.

=== Maccabi Rishon LeZion (2016–2017) ===
On July 31, 2016, Thomas signed a one-year deal with Maccabi Rishon LeZion. On October 19, 2016, Thomas recorded a season-high 23 points, shooting 8-of-16 from the field, along with three rebounds and two steals in a 72–64 win over Kataja. On April 18, 2017, Thomas participated in the 2017 Israeli League All-Star Game. In 52 games played during the 2016–17 season, he averaged 12.2 points, 4.4 rebounds and 1.3 assists per game. Thomas helped Rishon LeZion reach the 2017 Israeli League Final Four, where they eventually lost to Hapoel Jerusalem in the semifinals.

=== Pallacanestro Cantù (2017–2018) ===
On July 31, 2017, Thomas signed with the Italian team Pallacanestro Cantù for the 2017–18 season. Thomas helped Cantù reach the 2018 Italian Cup Semifinals where they eventually lost to Brescia.

=== Legnano Knights (2019) ===
On January 9, 2019, Thomas signed with Legnano Knights of the Italian Serie A2 Basket for the rest of the season. In 21 games played for Legnano, he led the league in scoring with 24.6 points per game, to go with 7.4 rebounds and 1.6 assists per game.

=== Ravenna (2019–2020) ===
On July 18, 2019, Thomas signed with Ravenna for the 2019–20 season. Where Thomas led the team to number 1 overall in the league and avg. 18.8 pts, 7 rebs, 2.5 assts, and 1 block per contest.

=== Givova Scafati (2020–2021) ===
On June 30, 2020, he has signed with Givova Scafati of the Italian Serie A2 Basket.

=== Hermine Nantes Basket (2021–2022) ===
On August 25, 2021, Thomas signed with Hermine Nantes Basket of the French LNB Pro B.

=== Peñarol (2022–present) ===
In September 2022, Thomas joined the Uruguayan side Peñarol.
