= Nelson Mandela Forum =

Indoor sports arena in Florence, Italy

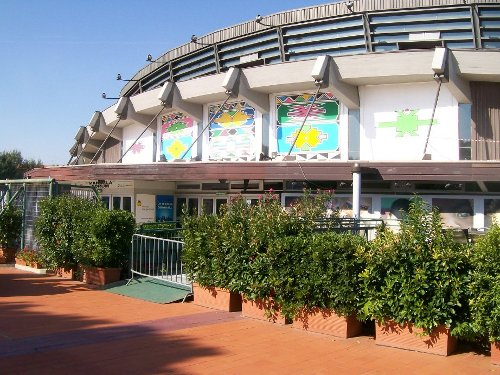
- Interactive map of Nelson Mandela Forum
- Former names: Palazzetto dello sport di Firenze, Palasport
- Address: Piazza Enrico Berlinguer, Florence, Italy
- Coordinates: 43.776859°N 11.283045°E
- Capacity: 7,500

Construction
- Opened: 1985
- Renovated: 2004

Tenant
- Il Bisonte Firenze (2014–present)

Website
- www.mandelaforum.it

Nelson Mandela Forum, formerly Palazzetto dello sport di Firenze and Palasport, is an indoor sports arena that is located in Florence, Italy. Inaugurated in 1985, the arena was renamed to Nelson Mandela Forum in 2004.

The seating capacity of the arena is 7,500 people for basketball games, and the maximum capacity for rock concerts, with general admission tickets, is 8,262 people. It was the home arena of the Italian basketball club Pool Firenze Basket, before the club's relegation to the minor leagues in 2009. It has been the home venue of the women's volleyball club Il Bisonte Firenze since 2014.

== Property ==
The structure is property of the city of Florence and is managed, since 2003, by the Associazione Palasport – Nelson Mandela Forum under a 12-year management agreement.

The Nelson Mandela Forum has a formal agreement with the Nelson Mandela Foundation that allows the use of the name of the South African former president.

The structure's compound is 25,000 m^{2} (269,098 sq ft) with 10,000 m^{2} (107,639 sq ft) of spaces where there are a main arena, a boxing training center, two areas used for gym (the latter being for many years home of the fencing center of Florence), one free climbing facility, and open spaces occupied by three permanent exhibitions on human rights.

== History ==
The arena hosted the 1990 basketball FIBA European Cup Winner's Cup Final, in which local Italian club Knorr Bologna won the title, in front of a crowd of 6,000 spectators.

In 2010 and 2018, the arena was one of the venues of the men's Volleyball World Championship.

The main financial sponsors are Fondazione Monte dei Paschi di Siena (a bank foundation) and Unicoop Firenze (a supermarket chain). It has hosted the concerts of: Pooh, Vasco Rossi, Alessandra Amoroso, Mark Knopfler, Eros Ramazzotti, Oasis, Soy Luna, Bob Dylan, Michael Bublé, Max Pezzali, Depeche Mode, Neil Young, Lenny Kravitz, Violetta, Marilyn Manson, Biagio Antonacci, Zucchero, Renato Zero, Francesco Guccini, Jovanotti, Tiziano Ferro, Gianna Nannini, Subsonica, Giorgia, Caetano Veloso, Boy George, Claudio Baglioni, Deep Purple, Antonello Venditti, Elisa, Laura Pausini, Litfiba, Marco Mengoni, and many more. On 11 June 2010, it hosted WWE in Europe with Smackdown.

From 22 to 29 September 2013 the Forum will host the 2013 UCI Road World Championships. As a result, the city has recently paved all the principal streets near the Forum.

Bellator MMA has hosted two events in the arena Bellator 168 on 10 December 2016 and Bellator 188 on 9 December 2017 which were both headlined by Italian fighter Alessio Sakara.

== Current use ==
During the summer when the main arena is not utilized, the compound of the Mandela Forum hosts two open-air cinemas with 600 and 250 seats that operate for the whole of the summer holidays season.

At the entrance of the Mandela Forum there is a mural painted by the South African Ndebele artist Esther Mahalangu inaugurated on 17 November 2010 by the Minister of Arts and Culture of the Republic of South Africa Paul Mashatile.

For the 2013–14 Euroleague season it was the home arena of Italian League club Mens Sana Basket.

The Dave Matthews Band performed live there on 18 October 2015.

In February 2018, the Mandela Forum hosted the 50th edition of the Italian Basketball Cup, Italy's first-tier cup competition.

== See also ==
- List of indoor arenas in Italy

Preceded by Peace and Friendship Stadium; Athens	European Cup; Final Venue; 1990	Succeeded by Patinoire des Vernets; Geneva
Preceded by Polideportivo Islas Malvinas; Mar del Plata	FIVB Volleyball World League; Final Venue; 2014	Succeeded by Maracanãzinho; Rio de Janeiro
