= Diante Garrett =

American basketball player (born 1988)

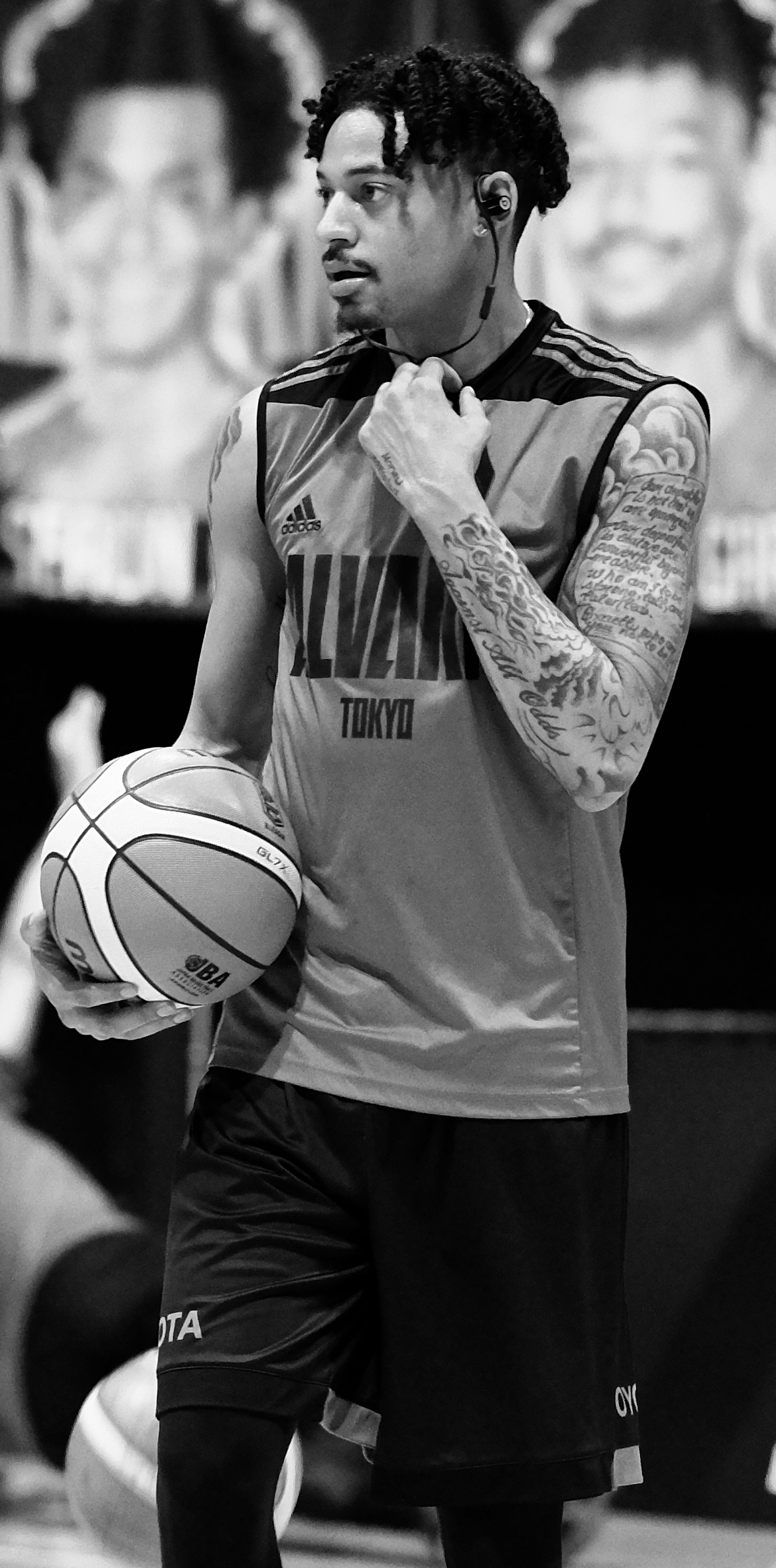
- Garrett with Alvark Tokyo in 2017

Iowa State Cyclones
- Title: Assistant coach
- League: Big 12 Conference

Personal information
- Born: November 3, 1988 (age 38) Milwaukee, Wisconsin, U.S.
- Listed height: 6 ft 4 in (1.93 m)
- Listed weight: 190 lb (86 kg)

Career information
- High school: Harold S. Vincent (Milwaukee, Wisconsin)
- College: Iowa State (2007–2011)
- NBA draft: 2011: undrafted
- Playing career: 2011–2024
- Position: Point guard / shooting guard
- Number: 10, 8
- Coaching career: 2024–present

Career history

Playing
- 2011: Zagreb
- 2011–2012: JSF Nanterre
- 2012–2013: Phoenix Suns
- 2013: →Bakersfield Jam
- 2013–2014: Utah Jazz
- 2014–2015: Iowa Energy
- 2015: Grand Rapids Drive
- 2015–2016: Maccabi Ashdod
- 2016–2017: Alvark Tokyo
- 2017–2018: Auxilium Torino
- 2018–2019: Tofaş
- 2020–2021: Promitheas Patras
- 2021: Gießen 46ers
- 2021: Gigantes de Carolina
- 2021–2022: Ironi Ness Ziona
- 2022–2023: Ironi Kiryat Ata
- 2023: Halcones de Xalapa
- 2024: CBet Jonava

Coaching
- 2024–present: Iowa State (assistant)

Career highlights
- Greek Super Cup winner (2020); Italian Cup champion (2018); Japanese League All-Star (2017); All-Japanese League Second Team (2017); NBA D-League All-Star (2015); Croatian League champion (2011); Second-team All-Big 12 (2011)
- Stats at NBA.com
- Stats at Basketball Reference

Diante Maurice Garrett (born November 3, 1988) is an American basketball coach and former professional player who is an assistant coach for the Iowa State Cyclones. He played college basketball for the Cyclones from 2007 to 2011.

== High school career ==
Garrett attended Harold S. Vincent High School in Milwaukee, Wisconsin. As a senior in 2006–07, he averaged 15.2 points and 5.3 assists per game, going on to be named the Milwaukee Player of the Year and was named first team all-state by the Milwaukee Journal Sentinel.

== College career ==
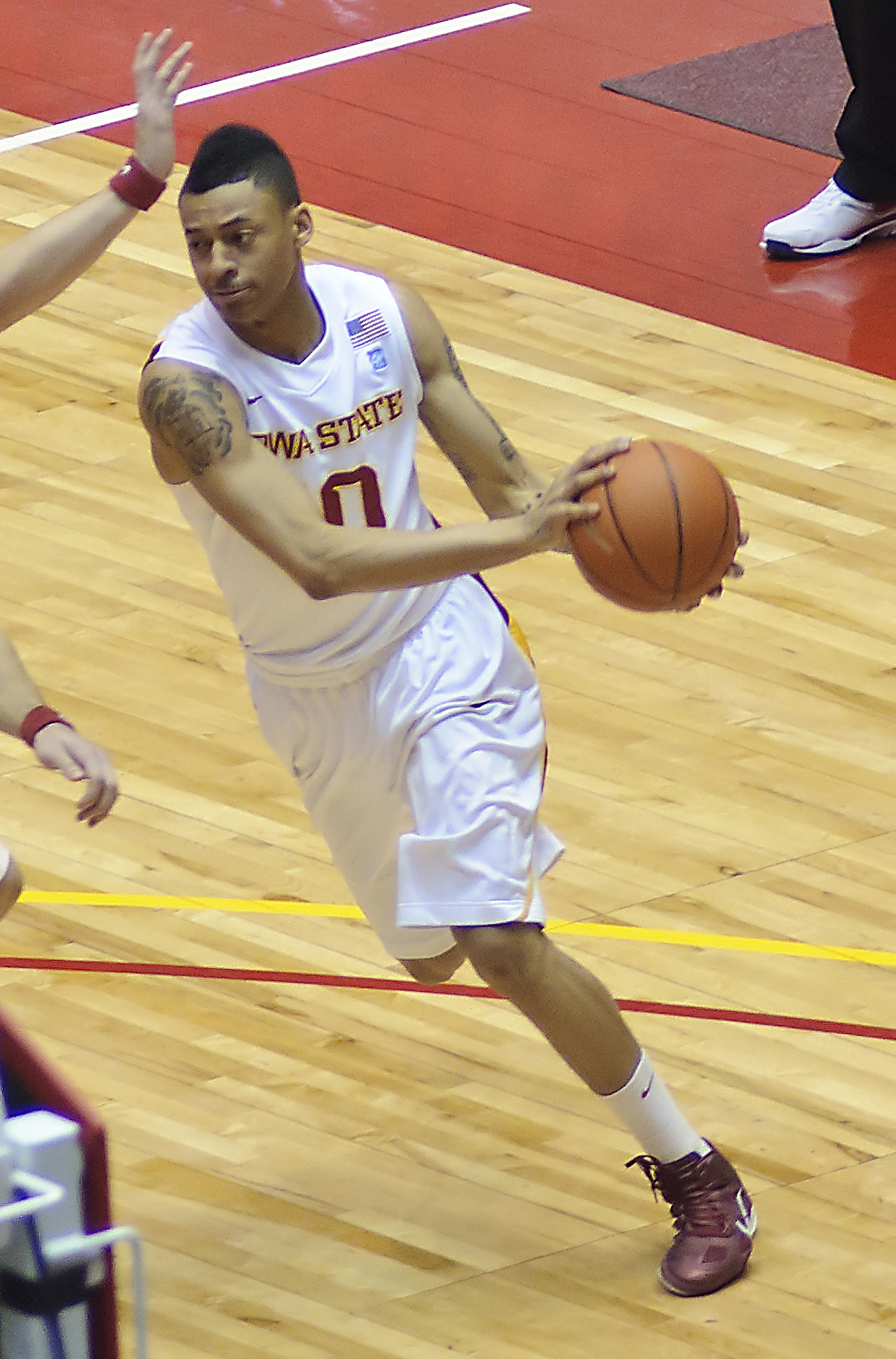
Garrett with the Iowa State Cyclones in 2011

In his freshman season, Garrett started four games and played in all 32 games; he averaged 6.3 points and was second on the team in assists with 91.

In his sophomore season, he was one of the Big 12's top playmakers, ranking third in the league and 36th nationally in assists (5.0 apg); his 161 assists ranked 16th on ISU's single-season assist chart. Garrett was also one of two players to start all 32 games and was second on the team in scoring (9.8 ppg) and averaged 3.3 rebounds per game.

In his junior season, Garrett was one of the Big 12 Conference's best point guards for the second straight year, ranking third in the league and 38th nationally in assists (5.1 apg); he recorded 164 assists to rank 15th on ISU's single-season assist chart. He was one of three players to start all 32 games, averaging 9.2 points and 2.5 rebounds per game.

In his senior season, he produced one of the best seasons at point guard in Iowa State history and was one of the nation's most improved players. Garrett earned All-Big 12 second team honors and USBWA All-District VI accolades while averaging 17.3 points, 6.1 assists and 1.7 steals per game. He led the Big 12 in assists (6.1 apg), the first Cyclone to top the league in assists since Jacy Holloway in 1996–97. Garrett graduated from Iowa State in May 2011 with a Bachelor of Liberal Studies degree.

=== College statistics ===
Year	Team	GP	GS	MPG	FG%	3P%	FT%	RPG	APG	SPG	BPG	PPG
2007–08	Iowa State	32	4	22.2	.351	.220	.699	1.8	2.8	.9	.1	6.3
2008–09	Iowa State	32	32	32.9	.407	.220	.707	3.3	5.0	.9	.1	9.8
2009–10	Iowa State	32	32	31.6	.438	.352	.694	2.5	5.1	1.3	.2	9.2
2010–11	Iowa State	32	31	36.7	.413	.319	.825	3.7	6.1	1.7	.2	17.3

== Professional career ==
=== 2011–12 season ===
Garrett went undrafted in the 2011 NBA draft. On July 23, 2011, he signed a one-year deal with KK Zagreb of Croatia. On November 7, 2011, he parted ways with Zagreb. The next day, he signed with JSF Nanterre of France for the rest of the 2011–12 season.

=== 2012–13 season ===
In July 2012, Garrett joined the Phoenix Suns for the 2012 NBA Summer League. On October 1, 2012, he signed with the Suns. On November 5, 2012, Garrett made his NBA debut recording 2 points, 2 assists and 1 steal in a 99–124 loss to the Miami Heat. During the 2012–13 season, he had multiple assignments with the Bakersfield Jam of the NBA D-League.

=== 2013–14 season ===
In July 2013, Garrett re-joined the Phoenix Suns for the 2013 NBA Summer League. On September 27, 2013, he signed with the Oklahoma City Thunder. However, he was later waived by the Thunder on October 25, 2013. On October 31, 2013, he was acquired by the Tulsa 66ers as an affiliate player. The next day, he was traded to the Iowa Energy. On November 13, 2013, he signed with the Utah Jazz.

=== 2014–15 season ===
On July 10, 2014, Garrett was traded to the Toronto Raptors in exchange for Steve Novak and a 2017 second round pick. On July 19, 2014, he was waived by the Raptors. On September 24, 2014, he signed with the Portland Trail Blazers. However, he was later waived by the Trail Blazers on October 25, 2014.

On November 4, 2014, Garrett was reacquired by the Iowa Energy. On February 12, 2015, he was named to the Futures All-Star team for the 2015 NBA D-League All-Star Game as a replacement for Lorenzo Brown. On February 26, he was traded to the Grand Rapids Drive in exchange for Willie Reed.

=== 2015–16 season ===
In July 2015, Garrett joined the Los Angeles Clippers for the 2015 NBA Summer League.

The following month, he signed with Maccabi Ashdod of the Israeli Basketball Premier League. In 32 starts he averaged 19.0 points (3rd in the league), 6.2 assists (2nd), and 1.4 steals per game, with an .826 free throw percentage.

=== 2016–17 season ===
On August 14, 2016, Garrett signed with the Alvark Tokyo od the B.League. He averaged 18.1 points, 3.9 assists per game.

=== 2017–18 season ===
For the 2017–18 season, Garrett signed with the Italian team Auxilium Torino. On February 18, 2018, Garrett won the 2018 edition of the Italian Basketball Cup with Fiat Torino by beating Germani Basket Brescia 69–67 in the Finals.

=== 2018–19 season ===
In July 2018, Garrett signed with Turkish club Tofaş, where he finished third in the Turkish league during the 2018–19 season. Meanwhile, he also personally averaged 18.4 points, 2.8 rebounds, 6.1 assists and 0.7 steals per contest, while shooting 43.5% from beyond the arc, in the team's EuroCup games.

=== 2020–21 season ===
After a long hiatus due to personal injuries and the COVID-19 pandemic, Garrett signed with EuroCup club Promitheas Patras of the Greek Basket League, on July 31, 2020. On January 4, 2021, he was released from the Greek team.

On January 26, 2021, Garrett signed with Giessen 46ers of the Basketball Bundesliga. In 19 games, he averaged 15.1 points, 4.9 assists (8th in the league), and 1.5 steals (6th) per game.

=== 2021–22 season ===
On August 2, 2021, Garrett signed in Puerto Rico with Gigantes de Carolina.

In 2021-22 he played for the Israeli team Ironi Nes Ziona. In 29 starts he averaged 15.6 points (10th in the league), 4.8 assists (9th), and 1.5 steals (10th) per game, with an .859 free throw percentage.

=== 2022–23 season ===
In the summer of 2022, Garrett signed with Ironi Kiryat Ata of the Israeli Basketball Premier League.

On December 23, 2024, Garrett announced his retirement.

== Coaching career ==
Garrett signed with Athletes Untapped as a private basketball coach on November 12, 2024.

On December 26, 2024, Garrett returned to the Iowa State Cyclones as an assistant coach under head coach T. J. Otzelberger.

== NBA career statistics ==
Legend
GP	Games played	GS	Games started	MPG	Minutes per game
FG%	Field goal percentage	3P%	3-point field goal percentage	FT%	Free throw percentage
RPG	Rebounds per game	APG	Assists per game	SPG	Steals per game
BPG	Blocks per game	PPG	Points per game	**Bold**	Career high

=== Regular season ===
Year	Team	GP	GS	MPG	FG%	3P%	FT%	RPG	APG	SPG	BPG	PPG
2012–13	Phoenix	19	0	7.8	.327	.200	.500	.8	1.6	.5	.0	2.1
2013–14	Utah	**71**	0	**14.8**	**.381**	**.375**	**.833**	**1.4**	**1.7**	**.6**	**.1**	**3.5**
Career		90	0	13.3	.373	.351	.682	1.2	1.7	.6	.1	3.2

== Honours ==
- Greek Basketball Super Cup: (2020)

== Personal life ==
Garrett is the son of Dick and LaRisa Garrett. His father played five seasons in the NBA for the Los Angeles Lakers, Buffalo Braves, New York Knicks and Milwaukee Bucks, averaging 10.3 points per game. His brother, Damon, played basketball at Wisconsin-Whitewater.
