= Giulio Gazzotti =

Italian basketball player (born 1991)

No. 24 – Derthona Basket
- Position: Power forward
- League: LBA; EuroCup

Personal information
- Born: September 23, 1991 (age 35) Bologna, Italy
- Listed height: 6 ft 8 in (2.03 m)
- Listed weight: 230 lb (104 kg)

Career information
- Playing career: 2008–present

Career history
- 2008–2010: Virtus Bologna
- 2010–2011: →Gira Ozzano
- 2011–2012: →Latina Basket
- 2012: →Pallacanestro Lucca
- 2013: →Pallacanestro Ferrara 2011
- 2013–2014: Virtus Bologna
- 2014–2015: Vanoli Cremona
- 2015–2017: Victoria Libertas Pesaro
- 2017–2019: Vanoli Cremona
- 2019–2022: Amici Pallacanestro Udinese
- 2022–2023: Pallacanestro Forlì 2.015
- 2023–2025: Scaligera Basket Verona
- 2025–2026: Pallacanestro Forlì 2.015
- 2026–present: Derthona Basket

Giulio Gazzotti (born September 23, 1991) is an Italian professional basketball player for Derthona Basket of the Italian Lega Basket Serie A (LBA) and the EuroCup.
