= 2016–17 Basketball Champions League playoffs =

The 2016–17 Basketball Champions League playoffs began on 7 February, and ended on 30 April, with the Final, which decided the champions of the 2016–17 season of the Basketball Champions League. 24 teams compete in the playoffs.

Times up to 25 March 2017 (round of 16) were CET (UTC+1), thereafter (quarter-finals and beyond) times were CEST (UTC+2).

== Format ==
The playoffs involved the twenty four teams which qualified as winners and runners-up, of each of the four groups in the 2016–17 Basketball Champions League Regular season.

Each tie in the playoffs, apart from the Final Four games, was played with two legs, with each team playing one leg at home. The team that scored more points on aggregate, over the two legs, advanced to the next round.

The five group winners, and the three best runner-up teams, were directly qualified for the round of 16, while the other sixteen teams were drawn against each other.

For the first phase and the round of 16, teams from the same country could not be drawn against each other.

== Qualified teams ==
Key to colors
| Directly qualified to the round of 16 | Seeded teams in the playoffs qualifiers | Unseeded teams in the playoffs qualifiers |

| Group | Winners | Runners-up | Third | Fourth | Fifth |
|---|---|---|---|---|---|
| A | (France) Monaco | (Turkey) Banvit | (Czech Republic) ČEZ Nymburk | (Greece) Aris | (Germany) Fraport Skyliners |
| B | (France) Le Mans Sarthe | (Italy) Umana Reyer Venezia | (Turkey) Pınar Karşıyaka | (Russia) Avtodor | (Israel) Maccabi Rishon LeZion |
| C | (France) ASVEL | (Lithuania) Neptūnas | (Germany) EWE Baskets Oldenburg | (Greece) PAOK | (Latvia) Ventspils |
| D | (Spain) Iberostar Tenerife | (Italy) Sidigas Avellino | (France) SIG Strasbourg | (Lithuania) Juventus | |
| E | (Turkey) Beşiktaş Sompo Japan | (Greece) AEK Athens | (Serbia) Partizan NIS | (Germany) MHP Riesen Ludwigsburg | (Italy) Dinamo Sassari |

== Bracket ==
Playoffs qualifiers
(Russia) Avtodor | 87 | 89 | 176
(Germany) Oldenburg | 84 | 98 | 182
(Israel) Maccabi R. LeZion | 66 | 82 | 148
(Germany) Ludwigsburg | 83 | 84 | 167
(Lithuania) Juventus | 77 | 54 | 131
(Greece) AEK Athens | 78 | 75 | 153
(Italy) Dinamo Sassari | 94 | 63 | 157
(Czech Republic) ČEZ Nymburk | 72 | 84 | 156
(Greece) Aris | 71 | 70 | 141
(France) SIG Strasbourg | 52 | 81 | 133
(Greece) PAOK | 74 | 82 | 156
(Serbia) Partizan NIS | 76 | 78 | 154
(Germany) Skyliners | 90 | 52 | 142
(Turkey) Pınar Karşıyaka | 80 | 72 | 152
(Latvia) Ventspils | 74 | 61 | 135
(Italy) Reyer Venezia | 67 | 70 | 137

Round of 16
(Germany) Oldenburg | 82 | 61 | 143
(Turkey) Banvit | 82 | 70 | 152
(Germany) Ludwigsburg | 73 | 52 | 125
(Lithuania) Neptūnas | 61 | 58 | 119
(Greece) AEK Athens | 69 | 87 | 156
(France) Monaco | 68 | 95 | 163
(Italy) Dinamo Sassari | 79 | 68 | 147
(France) Le Mans Sarthe | 63 | 66 | 129
(Greece) Aris | 67 | 67 | 134
(France) ASVEL | 67 | 81 | 148
(Greece) PAOK | 66 | 54 | 120
(Spain) Tenerife | 63 | 80 | 143
(Turkey) Pınar Karşıyaka | 75 | 90 | 165
(Turkey) Beşiktaş | 70 | 83 | 153
(Italy) Reyer Venezia | 53 | 72 | 125
(Italy) Sidigas Avellino | 49 | 68 | 117

Quarterfinals
(Turkey) Banvit | 87 | 59 | 146
(Germany) Ludwigsburg | 92 | 53 | 145
(France) Monaco | 73 | 79 | 152
(Italy) Dinamo Sassari | 62 | 76 | 138
(France) ASVEL | 62 | 51 | 113
(Spain) Tenerife | 62 | 61 | 123
(Turkey) Pınar Karşıyaka | 74 | 66 | 140
(Italy) Reyer Venezia | 71 | 74 | 145

Semifinals
(Turkey) Banvit | 83
(France) Monaco | 74
(Spain) Tenerife | 67
(Italy) Reyer Venezia | 58

Final
(Turkey) Banvit | 59
(Spain) Tenerife | 63
Third place
(France) Monaco | 91
(Italy) Reyer Venezia | 77

== Playoffs qualifiers ==
The first legs were played on 7–8 February, and the second legs will be played on 21–22 February 2017.

| Team 1 | Agg. | Team 2 | 1st leg | 2nd leg |
|---|---|---|---|---|
| Aris (Greece) | 141–133 | (France) SIG Strasbourg | 71–52 | 70–81 |
| Ventspils (Latvia) | 135–137 | (Italy) Umana Reyer Venezia | 74–67 | 61–70 |
| Avtodor (Russia) | 176–182 | (Germany) EWE Baskets Oldenburg | 87–84 | 89–98 |
| Juventus (Lithuania) | 131–153 | (Greece) AEK Athens | 77–78 | 54–75 |
| PAOK (Greece) | 156–154 | (Serbia) Partizan NIS | 74–76 | 82–78 |
| Maccabi Rishon LeZion (Israel) | 148–167 | (Germany) MHP Riesen Ludwigsburg | 66–83 | 82–84 |
| Fraport Skyliners (Germany) | 142–152 | (Turkey) Pınar Karşıyaka | 90–80 | 52–72 |
| Dinamo Sassari (Italy) | 157–156 | (Czech Republic) ČEZ Nymburk | 94–72 | 63–84 |

=== First leg ===
| 7 February 2017 | Ventspils (Latvia) | 74–67 | (Italy) Umana Reyer Venezia | Ventspils |
| 18:00 | Scoring by quarter: 16–17, 14–16, 19–17, 25–17 |
| | Pts: Deane 16; Rebs: Zaķis 12; Asts: Deane 3 PIR: Gulbis 15 | Report | Pts: Ejim 15; Rebs: Ress 7 Asts: Haynes 4 PIR: Ejim 17 | Arena: Ventspils Olympic Center; Attendance: 1,600; Referees: Srđan Dožai (CRO), Michał Proc (POL), Zdravko Rutešić (MNE) |

| 7 February 2017 | Aris (Greece) | 71–52 | (France) SIG Strasbourg | Thessaloniki |
| 18:30 | Scoring by quarter: 19–8, 19–20, 17–11, 16–13 |
| | Pts: Cummings 21; Rebs: Jackson 8 Asts: Cummings 5 PIR: Jackson 18 | Report | Pts: Lacombe 16; Rebs: Sy, Travis 5 Asts: Leloup 3 PIR: Lacombe 8 | Arena: Alexandreio Melathron Nick Galis; Attendance: 3,800; Referees: Antonio Conde (ESP), Milan Nedović (SLO), Petar Obradović (BIH) |

| 8 February 2017 | Avtodor (Russia) | 87–84 | (Germany) EWE Baskets Oldenburg | Saratov |
| 16:30 | Scoring by quarter: 25–21, 19–18, 17–15, 26–30 |
| | Pts: Kolesnikov 20; Rebs: Kolesnikov 6 Asts: Frazier 10; PIR: Frazier 23 | Report | Pts: Paulding 22; Rebs: De Zeeuw 8 Asts: Kramer 6 PIR: Kramer 21 | Arena: Kristall Ice; Attendance: 2,500; Referees: Aleksandar Glišić (SRB), Tomas Jasevičius (LTU), Boris Krejić (SLO) |

| 8 February 2017 | Juventus (Lithuania) | 77–78 | (Greece) AEK Athens | Utena |
| 18:00 | Scoring by quarter: 16–9, 14–21, 23–26, 24–22 |
| | Pts: Šulskis 18; Rebs: Diggs 7 Asts: Diggs 8 PIR: Diggs 28 | Report | Pts: Dixon 15; Rebs: Larentzakis 6 Asts: Šakota 4 PIR: Šakota 21 | Arena: Utena Arena; Attendance: 1,589; Referees: Ademir Zurapović (BIH), Martin Horozov (BUL), Tolga Sahin (ITA) |

| 8 February 2017 | Maccabi Rishon LeZion (Israel) | 66–83 | (Germany) MHP Riesen Ludwigsburg | Rishon LeZion |
| 20:00 | Scoring by quarter: 15–22, 22–19, 12–18, 17–24 |
| | Pts: Richard 14; Rebs: McCrea 6 Asts: Ben Chimol 7 PIR: McCrea 16 | Report | Pts: Toppert 20; Rebs: Cooley 9 Asts: Hammonds 4 PIR: Toppert 19 | Arena: Beit Maccabi; Attendance: 1,300; Referees: Eddie Viator (FRA), Manuel Mazzoni (ITA), Artūras Šukys (LTU) |

| 8 February 2017 | Fraport Skyliners (Germany) | 90–80 | (Turkey) Pınar Karşıyaka | Frankfurt |
| 20:00 | Scoring by quarter: 21–20, 15–21, 27–13, 27–26 |
| | Pts: Morrison 35; Rebs: three players 7 Asts: three players 6 PIR: Morrison 40 | Report | Pts: Brown 29; Rebs: Owens 7 Asts: Brown 5 PIR: Brown 22 | Arena: Fraport Arena; Attendance: 1,200; Referees: Sergiy Zashchuk (UKR), Nicolas Maestre (FRA), Aleksandar Milojević (MKD) |

| 8 February 2017 | PAOK (Greece) | 74–76 | (Serbia) Partizan NIS | Thessaloniki |
| 20:00 | Scoring by quarter: 14–22, 18–18, 24–13, 18–23 |
| | Pts: McFadden 20; Rebs: Clanton 11; Asts: McFadden 4 PIR: McFadden 17 | Report | Pts: Hatcher 27; Rebs: Birčević, Luković 6 Asts: Hatcher 4 PIR: Hatcher 25 | Arena: PAOK Sports Arena; Attendance: 6,000; Referees: Vicente Bultó (ESP), Mehdi Difallah (FRA), Saverio Lanzarini (ITA) |

| 8 February 2017 | Dinamo Sassari (Italy) | 94–72 | (Czech Republic) ČEZ Nymburk | Sassari |
| 20:30 | Scoring by quarter: 20–23, 22–18, 29–13, 23–18 |
| | Pts: Stipčević 20; Rebs: Lacey 6 Asts: Stipčević 5 PIR: Stipčević, Lacey 25 | Report | Pts: Sant-Roos 15; Rebs: Benda 11; Asts: Lawrence 6 PIR: Simpson 20 | Arena: PalaSerradimigni; Attendance: 2,885; Referees: Murat Biricik (TUR), Haris Bijedić (BIH), Yohan Rosso (FRA) |

=== Second leg ===
| 21 February 2017 | Pınar Karşıyaka (Turkey) | 72–52 (152–142 agg.) | (Germany) Fraport Skyliners | İzmir |
| 18:00 | Scoring by quarter: 21–6, 26–14, 15–14, 10–18 |
| | Pts: Green 18; Rebs: three players 6 Asts: Brown 9 PIR: Green 22 | Report | Pts: Morrison 12; Rebs: Morrison 8 Asts: Robertson 4 PIR: Morrison 11 | Arena: Karşıyaka Arena; Attendance: 4,300; Referees: Vicente Bultó (ESP), Alexey Davydov (RUS), Tanel Suslov (EST) |

| 21 February 2017 | AEK Athens (Greece) | 75–54 (153–131 agg.) | (Lithuania) Juventus | Athens |
| 18:30 | Scoring by quarter: 25–9, 12–18, 18–11, 20–16 |
| | Pts: Dixon, Elonu 14; Rebs: Elonu 6 Asts: Dixon 5 PIR: Elonu 24 | Report | Pts: Galdikas 11; Rebs: Šulskis 11; Asts: Čepukaitis 5 PIR: Čepukaitis 18 | Arena: Olympic Sports Center; Attendance: 6,000; Referees: Srđan Dožai (CRO), Mehdi Difallah (FRA), Saša Maričić (SRB) |

| 21 February 2017 | ČEZ Nymburk (Czech Republic) | 84–63 (156–157 agg.) | (Italy) Dinamo Sassari | Nymburk |
| 18:30 | Scoring by quarter: 17–11, 18–14, 30–17, 19–21 |
| | Pts: Allen, Simpson 18; Rebs: Simpson 12; Asts: Lawrence 10; PIR: Lawrence, Simpson 25 | Report | Pts: Lacey 17; Rebs: Lacey, Lawal 6 Asts: Lacey 5 PIR: Lacey 21 | Arena: Sportovní Centrum; Attendance: 1,230; Referees: Ademir Zurapović (BIH), Oskars Lucis (LAT), Markos Michaelides (SUI) |

| 21 February 2017 | EWE Baskets Oldenburg (Germany) | 98–89 (182–176 agg.) | (Russia) Avtodor | Oldenburg |
| 20:00 | Scoring by quarter: 24–21, 27–19, 28–18, 19–31 |
| | Pts: Qvale 34; Rebs: Qvale 8 Asts: Kramer 10; PIR: Qvale 40 | Report | Pts: Minnerath 21; Rebs: Minnerath 8 Asts: Bykov 8 PIR: Bykov 20 | Arena: Große EWE Arena; Attendance: 2,718; Referees: Apostolos Kalpakas (SWE), Luka Kardum (CRO), Milan Nedović (SLO) |

| 22 February 2017 | Partizan NIS (Serbia) | 78–82 (154–156 agg.) | (Greece) PAOK | Belgrade |
| 18:30 | Scoring by quarter: 16–18, 16–29, 18–17, 28–18 |
| | Pts: Veličković 19; Rebs: Luković 9 Asts: Pot 6 PIR: Veličković 18 | Report | Pts: McFadden 26; Rebs: Clanton 10; Asts: McFadden 7 PIR: McFadden 31 | Arena: Aleksandar Nikolić; Attendance: 8,000; Referees: Eddie Viator (FRA), Luis Miguel Castillo Larroca (ESP), Sergiy Zashchuk (UKR) |

| 22 February 2017 | MHP Riesen Ludwigsburg (Germany) | 84–82 (167–148 agg.) | (Israel) Maccabi Rishon LeZion | Ludwigsburg |
| 20:00 | Scoring by quarter: 11–19, 20–16, 27–25, 26–22 |
| | Pts: Cooley 20; Rebs: Cooley 8 Asts: Hammonds 6 PIR: Cooley 28 | Report | Pts: Dawson 21; Rebs: McCrea 8 Asts: Wayns 6 PIR: McCrea 26 | Arena: Arena Ludwigsburg; Attendance: 2,305; Referees: Aleksandar Glišić (SRB), Gentian Cici (ALB), Georgios Poursanidis (GRE) |

| 22 February 2017 | SIG Strasbourg (France) | 81–70 (133–141 agg.) | (Greece) Aris | Strasbourg |
| 20:30 | Scoring by quarter: 19–11, 20–17, 24–16, 18–26 |
| | Pts: Walker 19; Rebs: Lacombe, Jaiteh 7 Asts: Leloup 5 PIR: Walker 19 | Report | Pts: Zaras 19; Rebs: three players 5 Asts: Cummings 4 PIR: Zaras 15 | Arena: Rhénus Sport; Attendance: 5,935; Referees: Marek Cmikiewicz (POL), Andris Aunkrogers (LAT), Radomir Vojinović (MNE) |

| 22 February 2017 | Umana Reyer Venezia (Italy) | 70–61 (137–135 agg.) | (Latvia) Ventspils | Venice |
| 20:30 | Scoring by quarter: 23–17, 7–13, 15–16, 25–15 |
| | Pts: Ejim 18; Rebs: Bramos 11; Asts: Filloy 6 PIR: Bramos 17 | Report | Pts: Deane 18; Rebs: Gulbis, Campbell 6 Asts: Deane 4 PIR: Deane 21 | Arena: Taliercio; Attendance: 3,000; Referees: Panagiotis Anastopoulos (GRE), Jasmina Juras (SRB), Miguel Ángel Pérez Niz (ESP) |

== Round of 16 ==
The first legs will be played on 28 February–1 March, and the second legs will be played on 7–8 March 2017.

| Team 1 | Agg. | Team 2 | 1st leg | 2nd leg |
|---|---|---|---|---|
| Aris (Greece) | 134–148 | (France) ASVEL | 67–67 | 67–81 |
| AEK Athens (Greece) | 156–163 | (France) Monaco | 69–68 | 87–95 |
| PAOK (Greece) | 120–143 | (Spain) Iberostar Tenerife | 66–63 | 54–80 |
| Dinamo Sassari (Italy) | 147–129 | (France) Le Mans Sarthe | 79–63 | 68–66 |
| MHP Riesen Ludwigsburg (Germany) | 125–119 | (Lithuania) Neptūnas | 73–61 | 52–58 |
| EWE Baskets Oldenburg (Germany) | 143–152 | (Turkey) Banvit | 82–82 | 61–70 |
| Umana Reyer Venezia (Italy) | 125–117 | (Italy) Sidigas Avellino | 53–49 | 72–68 |
| Pınar Karşıyaka (Turkey) | 165–153 | (Turkey) Beşiktaş Sompo Japan | 75–70 | 90–83 |

=== First leg ===
| 28 February 2017 | AEK Athens (Greece) | 69–68 | (France) Monaco | Athens |
| 18:30 | Scoring by quarter: 22–15, 15–20, 16–18, 19–15 |
| | Pts: Šakota 20; Rebs: Elonu, Mavrokefalidis 6 Asts: McGrath 4 PIR: Šakota 21 | Report | Pts: Wright 11; Rebs: Gladyr 6 Asts: Wright 7 PIR: Wright 16 | Arena: Olympic Sports Center; Attendance: 7,500; Referees: Vicente Bultó (ESP), Marek Cmikiewicz (POL), Tolga Sahin (ITA) |

| 28 February 2017 | PAOK (Greece) | 66–63 | (Spain) Iberostar Tenerife | Thessaloniki |
| 18:30 | Scoring by quarter: 16–16, 18–14, 23–16, 9–17 |
| | Pts: Peiners 15; Rebs: Clanton 10; Asts: Miljenović 5 PIR: Chrysikopoulos 16 | Report | Pts: Doornekamp 19; Rebs: Doornekamp 12; Asts: four players 3 PIR: Doornekamp 28 | Arena: PAOK Sports Arena; Attendance: 2,500; Referees: Tomas Jasevičius (LTU), Janusz Calik (POL), Manuel Mazzoni (ITA) |

| 28 February 2017 | EWE Baskets Oldenburg (Germany) | 82–82 | (Turkey) Banvit | Oldenburg |
| 21:00 | Scoring by quarter: 19–13, 22–22, 23–22, 18–25 |
| | Pts: Kramer 19; Rebs: Schwethelm 6 Asts: Kramer 10; PIR: Kramer 30 | Report | Pts: Orelik 23; Rebs: Korkmaz 7 Asts: Geçim 8 PIR: Orelik 18 | Arena: Große EWE Arena; Attendance: 2,267; Referees: Ademir Zurapović (BIH), Mehdi Difallah (FRA), Radomir Vojinović (MNE) |

| 1 March 2017 | Pınar Karşıyaka (Turkey) | 75–70 | (Turkey) Beşiktaş Sompo Japan | İzmir |
| 18:00 | Scoring by quarter: 22–13, 19–27, 16–18, 18–12 |
| | Pts: Green 25; Rebs: Summers, Owens 6 Asts: Brown 6 PIR: Green 29 | Report | Pts: Štimac 20; Rebs: Štimac 13; Asts: Sipahi 7 PIR: Štimac 28 | Arena: Karşıyaka Arena; Attendance: 5,000; Referees: Antonio Conde (ESP), Saverio Lanzarini (ITA), Artūras Šukys (LTU) |

| 1 March 2017 | Aris (Greece) | 67–67 | (France) ASVEL | Thessaloniki |
| 18:30 | Scoring by quarter: 17–21, 20–15, 17–13, 13–18 |
| | Pts: Cummings 21; Rebs: Jackson 8 Asts: Cummings 5 PIR: Jackson 18 | Report | Pts: Uter 14; Rebs: Uter 12; Asts: Uter 3 PIR: Uter 21 | Arena: Alexandreio Melathron Nick Galis; Attendance: 4,500; Referees: Srđan Dožai (CRO), Aleksandar Glišić (SRB), Boris Krejić (SLO) |

| 1 March 2017 | MHP Riesen Ludwigsburg (Germany) | 73–61 | (Lithuania) Neptūnas | Ludwigsburg |
| 20:00 | Scoring by quarter: 15–16, 18–21, 27–13, 13–11 |
| | Pts: Cooley 19; Rebs: Cooley 12; Asts: Hammonds 5 PIR: Cooley 25 | Report | Pts: Ewing 14; Rebs: Kačinas 10; Asts: Kačinas 3 PIR: Šarakauskas 12 | Arena: Arena Ludwigsburg; Attendance: 1,880; Referees: Murat Biricik (TUR), Georgios Poursanidis (GRE), Ventsislav Velikov (BUL) |

| 1 March 2017 | Dinamo Sassari (Italy) | 79–63 | (France) Le Mans Sarthe | Sassari |
| 20:30 | Scoring by quarter: 16–14, 20–18, 16–19, 27–12 |
| | Pts: Lawal 19; Rebs: Lawal 9 Asts: Stipčević 9 PIR: Lawal 23 | Report | Pts: Hanlan 15; Rebs: Yeguete 7 Asts: Watson, Yarou 3 PIR: Konaté 11 | Arena: PalaSerradimigni; Attendance: 3,000; Referees: Panagiotis Anastopoulos (GRE), Gentian Cici (ALB), Milan Nedović (SLO) |

| 1 March 2017 | Umana Reyer Venezia (Italy) | 53–49 | (Italy) Sidigas Avellino | Venezia |
| 20:30 | Scoring by quarter: 12–18, 10–12, 18–15, 13–4 |
| | Pts: Perić 11; Rebs: Hagins 10; Asts: McGee 3 PIR: Hagins 11 | Report | Pts: Ragland, Randolph 11; Rebs: Fesenko 10; Asts: Ragland 7 PIR: Ragland 16 | Arena: Taliercio; Attendance: 2,600; Referees: Eddie Viator (FRA), Martin Horozov (BUL), Apostolos Kalpakas (SWE) |

=== Second leg ===
| 7 March 2017 | Banvit (Turkey) | 70–61 (152–143 agg.) | (Germany) EWE Baskets Oldenburg | Bandırma |
| 18:00 | Scoring by quarter: 14–20, 22–6, 17–15, 17–20 |
| | Pts: Theodore 22; Rebs: Vidmar 10; Asts: Theodore 9 PIR: Korkmaz, Theodore 22 | Report | Pts: Qvale 13; Rebs: Qvale 7 Asts: Massenat 5 PIR: Qvale, Schwethelm 13 | Arena: Kara Ali Acar; Attendance: 2,000; Referees: Antonio Conde (ESP), Markos Michaelides (SUI), Sergiy Zashchuk (UKR) |

| 7 March 2017 | Le Mans Sarthe (France) | 66–68 (129–147 agg.) | (Italy) Dinamo Sassari | Le Mans |
| 18:30 | Scoring by quarter: 21–18, 14–12, 19–17, 12–21 |
| | Pts: Watson 16; Rebs: Hanlan 5 Asts: Konaté 3 PIR: Pearson 15 | Report | Pts: Savanović 15; Rebs: Savanović 9 Asts: Stipčević 5 PIR: Savanović 17 | Arena: Antarès; Attendance: 2,000; Referees: Srđan Dožai (CRO), Apostolos Kalpakas (SWE), Boris Krejić (SLO) |

| 7 March 2017 | ASVEL (France) | 81–67 (148–134 agg.) | (Greece) Aris | Villeurbanne |
| 20:30 | Scoring by quarter: 22–25, 26–8, 21–10, 12–24 |
| | Pts: Hodge 19; Rebs: Uter, Watkins 6 Asts: Hodge 6 PIR: Hodge 21 | Report | Pts: Zaras 19; Rebs: three players 5 Asts: Cummings 4 PIR: Zaras 15 | Arena: Astroballe; Attendance: 5,486; Referees: Ademir Zurapović (BIH), Saverio Lanzarini (ITA), Michał Proc (POL) |

| 8 March 2017 | Neptūnas (Lithuania) | 58–52 (119–125 agg.) | (Germany) MHP Riesen Ludwigsburg | Klaipėda |
| 18:00 | Scoring by quarter: 12–9, 11–16, 17–14, 18–13 |
| | Pts: Kačinas 12; Rebs: Grant 10; Asts: Ewing 5 PIR: Kačinas 16 | Report | Pts: Cotton 13; Rebs: Cooley 11; Asts: Cotton 3 PIR: Crawford 13 | Arena: Švyturys Arena; Attendance: 5,400; Referees: Nicolas Maestre (FRA), Marek Maliszewski (POL), Miguel Ángel Pérez Niz (ESP) |

| 8 March 2017 | Beşiktaş Sompo Japan (Turkey) | 83–90 (153–165 agg.) | (Turkey) Pınar Karşıyaka | Istanbul |
| 18:00 | Scoring by quarter: 22–24, 29–13, 21–32, 11–21 |
| | Pts: Štimac, Strawberry 16; Rebs: Štimac 12; Asts: Roll 7 PIR: Štimac 22 | Report | Pts: Green 22; Rebs: Owens 10; Asts: Brown 7 PIR: Green 26 | Arena: Akatlar Arena; Attendance: 2,200; Referees: Vicente Bultó (ESP), Tomas Jasevičius (LTU), Eddie Viator (FRA) |

| 8 March 2017 | Monaco (France) | 95–87 (163–156 agg.) | (Greece) AEK Athens | Fontvieille, Monaco |
| 20:30 | Scoring by quarter: 30–19, 17–21, 28–21, 20–26 |
| | Pts: Shuler 20; Rebs: Caner-Medley 8 Asts: Wright 6 PIR: Shuler 27 | Report | Pts: Mavrokefalidis 18; Rebs: Mavrokefalidis 12; Asts: McGrath 7 PIR: Mavrokefalidis 26 | Arena: Salle Gaston Médecin; Attendance: 2,200; Referees: Murat Biricik (TUR), Milan Nedović (SLO), Aleksandar Glišić (SRB) |

| 8 March 2017 | Iberostar Tenerife (Spain) | 80–54 (143–120 agg.) | (Greece) PAOK | San Cristóbal de La Laguna |
| 20:30 | Scoring by quarter: 15–10, 35–6, 25–25, 18–13 |
| | Pts: Grigonis 20; Rebs: Abromaitis 8 Asts: Grigonis 5 PIR: Grigonis 23 | Report | Pts: Peiners 14; Rebs: Chrysikopoulos 14; Asts: Chrysikopoulos 3 PIR: Chrysikopoulos 19 | Arena: Santiago Martín; Attendance: 4,689; Referees: Tolga Sahin (ITA), Mehdi Difallah (FRA), Martin Horozov (BUL) |

| 8 March 2017 | Sidigas Avellino (Italy) | 68–72 (117–125 agg.) | (Italy) Umana Reyer Venezia | Avellino |
| 20:30 | Scoring by quarter: 14–21, 13–19, 22–16, 19–16 |
| | Pts: Logan 15; Rebs: Fesenko 16; Asts: Ragland 6 PIR: Fesenko 20 | Report | Pts: Haynes 16; Rebs: Ejim 7 Asts: Filloy, Haynes 3 PIR: Haynes 17 | Arena: Giacomo del Mauro; Attendance: 3,300; Referees: Panagiotis Anastopoulos (GRE), Haris Bijedić (BIH), Saša Maričić (SRB) |

== Quarterfinals ==
The first legs will be played on 21–22 March, and the second legs will be played on 28–29 March 2017.

| Team 1 | Agg. | Team 2 | 1st leg | 2nd leg |
|---|---|---|---|---|
| ASVEL (France) | 113–123 | (Spain) Iberostar Tenerife | 62–62 | 51–61 |
| Pınar Karşıyaka (Turkey) | 140–145 | (Italy) Umana Reyer Venezia | 74–71 | 66–74 |
| Banvit (Turkey) | 146–145 | (Germany) MHP Riesen Ludwigsburg | 87–92 | 59–53 |
| Monaco (France) | 152–138 | (Italy) Dinamo Sassari | 73–62 | 79–76 |

=== First leg ===
| 21 March 2017 | Banvit (Turkey) | 87–92 | (Germany) MHP Riesen Ludwigsburg | Bandırma |
| 18:00 | Scoring by quarter: 25–29, 17–23, 20–22, 25–18 |
| | Pts: Theodore 18; Rebs: Theodore 7 Asts: Kulig 5 PIR: Vidmar 18 | Report | Pts: Martin 19; Rebs: Crawford, Thiemann 7 Asts: Hammonds 6 PIR: Martin 22 | Arena: Kara Ali Acar; Attendance: 2,000; Referees: Aleksandar Glišić (SRB), Marek Cmikiewicz (POL), Tomas Jasevičius (LTU) |

| 21 March 2017 | ASVEL (France) | 62–62 | (Spain) Iberostar Tenerife | Villeurbanne |
| 20:30 | Scoring by quarter: 12–16, 18–16, 22–13, 10–17 |
| | Pts: Hodge 12; Rebs: Dragović, Watkins 8 Asts: three players 3 PIR: Dragović 24 | Report | Pts: Grigonis 16; Rebs: Doornekamp 7 Asts: San Miguel 6 PIR: Doornekamp 16 | Arena: Astroballe; Attendance: 5,564; Referees: Panagiotis Anastopoulos (GRE), Apostolos Kalpakas (SWE), Saša Maričić (SRB) |

| 22 March 2017 | Pınar Karşıyaka (Turkey) | 74–71 | (Italy) Umana Reyer Venezia | İzmir |
| 18:00 | Scoring by quarter: 25–15, 15–15, 15–17, 19–24 |
| | Pts: Ponitka 25; Rebs: Summers 9 Asts: Brown 6 PIR: Ponitka 28 | Report | Pts: Haynes 19; Rebs: Ejim 7 Asts: Filloy 8 PIR: Ejim 18 | Arena: Karşıyaka Arena; Attendance: 4,987; Referees: Srđan Dožai (CRO), Nicolas Maestre (FRA), Marek Maliszewski (POL) |

| 22 March 2017 | Monaco (France) | 73–62 | (Italy) Dinamo Sassari | Fontvieille, Monaco |
| 20:30 | Scoring by quarter: 16–15, 23–15, 21–10, 13–22 |
| | Pts: Ouattara 17; Rebs: Fofana 6 Asts: Bost 8 PIR: Davies 17 | Report | Pts: Stipčević 17; Rebs: Savanović 7 Asts: Stipčević 5 PIR: Stipčević 17 | Arena: Salle Gaston Médecin; Attendance: 2,700; Referees: Vicente Bultó (ESP), Markos Michaelides (SUI), Ademir Zurapović (BIH) |

=== Second leg ===
| 29 March 2017 | MHP Riesen Ludwigsburg (Germany) | 53–59 (145–146 agg.) | (Turkey) Banvit | Arena Ludwigsburg |
| 20:00 | Scoring by quarter: 12–21, 16–10, 10–14, 15–14 |
| | Pts: Crawford 14; Rebs: Crawford 9 Asts: Trice 3 PIR: Crawford 16 | Report | Pts: Theodore 13; Rebs: Theodore 7 Asts: Theodore 5 PIR: Chappell 17 | Arena: Ludwigsburg; Attendance: 3,669; Referees: Vicente Bultó (ESP), Manuel Mazzoni (ITA), Georgios Poursanidis (GRE) |

| 29 March 2017 | Iberostar Tenerife (Spain) | 61–51 (123–113 agg.) | (France) ASVEL | San Cristóbal de La Laguna |
| 20:30 | Scoring by quarter: 13–10, 17–14, 11–14, 20–13 |
| | Pts: Bogris 12; Rebs: Vázquez 6 Asts: Abromaitis 4 PIR: Bogris 16 | Report | Pts: Hodge 15; Rebs: Kahudi 6 Asts: Hodge 5 PIR: Hodge 13 | Arena: Santiago Martín; Attendance: 5,166; Referees: Srđan Dožai (CRO), Tomas Jasevičius (LTU), Tolga Sahin (ITA) |

| 29 March 2017 | Umana Reyer Venezia (Italy) | 74–66 (145–140 agg.) | (Turkey) Pınar Karşıyaka | Venice |
| 20:30 | Scoring by quarter: 20–19, 16–20, 17–12, 21–15 |
| | Pts: Ejim 16; Rebs: Ejim 11; Asts: Filloy 6 PIR: Ejim 24 | Report | Pts: Brown 22; Rebs: Summers 7 Asts: Brown 4 PIR: Brown 18 | Arena: Taliercio; Attendance: 3,509; Referees: Antonio Conde (ESP), Marek Cmikiewicz (POL), Saša Maričić (SRB) |

| 29 March 2017 | Dinamo Sassari (Italy) | 76–79 (138–152 agg.) | (France) Monaco | Sassari |
| 20:30 | Scoring by quarter: 15–18, 19–19, 20–26, 22–16 |
| | Pts: Bell 20; Rebs: Lydeka, Savanović 6 Asts: Bell 5 PIR: Bell 19 | Report | Pts: Wright 26; Rebs: Wright 8 Asts: Wright 7 PIR: Wright 36 | Arena: PalaSerradimigni; Attendance: 4,323; Referees: Panagiotis Anastopoulos (GRE), Aleksandar Glišić (SRB), Miguel Ángel Pérez Niz (ESP) |

== Final Four ==
Semifinals
28 April
(Turkey) Banvit | 83
(France) Monaco | 74
28 April
(Spain) Iberostar Tenerife | 67
(Italy) Umana Reyer Venezia | 58

Final
30 April
(Turkey) Banvit | 59
(Spain) Iberostar Tenerife | 63
Third place game
30 April
(France) Monaco | 91
(Italy) Umana Reyer Venezia | 77
