= 2017 Basketball Champions League Final Four =

- Season: 2016–17 BCL season

Tournament details
- Arena: Santiago Martín; La Laguna, Spain
- Dates: 28–30 April 2017

Final positions
- Champions: (Spain) Iberostar Tenerife; 1st title
- Runners-up: (Turkey) Banvit
- Third place: (France) Monaco
- Fourth place: (Italy) Umana Reyer Venezia

Awards and statistics
- MVP: (Lithuania) Marius Grigonis
- Top scorer(s): (North Macedonia) Jordan Theodore (38)

The 2017 Basketball Champions League Final Four was the inaugural Basketball Champions League tournament. It was the concluding phase of the 2016–17 Basketball Champions League season.

== Venue ==
The Santiago Martín hosted the final tournament for the first time.

San Cristóbal de La Laguna
	2017 Basketball Champions League Final Four (Atlantic Ocean)
Santiago Martín	2017 Basketball Champions League Final Four (Atlantic Ocean)
Capacity: 5,100	2017 Basketball Champions League Final Four (Atlantic Ocean)

== Road to the Final Four ==
Note: In the table, the score of the Final Four team is given first (H = home; A = away).

Road to the Final Four
(France) Monaco				Round	(Spain) Iberostar Tenerife			
Group A: Pos / Team / Pld / Pts; 1 / Monaco / 14 / 26; 2 / (Turkey) Banvit / 14 / 25; 3 / (Czech Republic) ČEZ Nymburk / 14 / 24; 4 / (Greece) Aris / 14 / 22; 5 / (Germany) Fraport Skyliners / 14 / 21; 6 / (Israel) Ironi Nahariya / 14 / 19; 7 / (Slovenia) Helios Suns / 14 / 16; 8 / (Denmark) Bakken Bears / 14 / 15; Source: Basketball Champions League				Regular season	Group D: Pos / Team / Pld / Pts; 1 / (Spain) Iberostar Tenerife / 14 / 25; 2 / (Italy) Sidigas Avellino / 14 / 24; 3 / (France) SIG Strasbourg / 14 / 23; 4 / (Lithuania) Juventus / 14 / 22; 5 / (Belgium) Telenet Oostende / 14 / 20; 6 / (Croatia) Cibona / 14 / 19; 7 / (Serbia) Mega Leks / 14 / 18; 8 / (Montenegro) Mornar / 14 / 17; Source: Basketball Champions League			
Opponent	Agg.	1st leg	2nd leg	Play-offs	Opponent	Agg.	1st leg	2nd leg
—N/a				Play-off qualifiers	—N/a			
(Greece) AEK Athens	163–156	68–69 (A)	95–87 (H)	Round of 16	(Greece) PAOK	140–123	66–63 (A)	80–54 (H)
(Italy) Dinamo Sassari	152–138	73–62 (H)	79–76 (A)	Quarterfinals	(France) ASVEL	123–113	62–62 (A)	61–51 (H)
(Italy) Umana Reyer Venezia				Round	(Turkey) Banvit			
Group B: Pos / Team / Pld / Pts; 1 / (France) Le Mans Sarthe / 14 / 23; 2 / (Italy) Umana Reyer Venezia / 14 / 23; 3 / (Turkey) Pınar Karşıyaka / 14 / 23; 4 / (Russia) Avtodor / 14 / 21; 5 / (Israel) Maccabi Rishon LeZion / 14 / 21; 6 / (Romania) Oradea / 14 / 20; 7 / (Finland) Kataja / 14 / 20; 8 / (Ukraine) Khimik / 14 / 17; Source: Basketball Champions League				Regular season	Group A: Pos / Team / Pld / Pts; 1 / Monaco / 14 / 26; 2 / (Turkey) Banvit / 14 / 25; 3 / (Czech Republic) ČEZ Nymburk / 14 / 24; 4 / (Greece) Aris / 14 / 22; 5 / (Germany) Fraport Skyliners / 14 / 21; 6 / (Israel) Ironi Nahariya / 14 / 19; 7 / (Slovenia) Helios Suns / 14 / 16; 8 / (Denmark) Bakken Bears / 14 / 15; Source: Basketball Champions League			
Opponent	Agg.	1st leg	2nd leg	Play-offs	Opponent	Agg.	1st leg	2nd leg
(Latvia) Ventspils	137–135	67–74 (A)	70–61 (H)	Play-off qualifiers	—N/a			
(Italy) Sidigas Avellino	125–117	53–49 (H)	72–68 (A)	Round of 16	(Germany) EWE Baskets Oldenburg	152–143	82–82 (A)	70–61 (H)
(Turkey) Pınar Karşıyaka	145–140	71–74 (A)	74–66 (H)	Quarterfinals	(Germany) MHP Riesen Ludwigsburg	146–145	87–92 (H)	59–53 (A)

== Bracket ==
Semifinals
28 April
(Turkey) Banvit	83
(France) Monaco	74
28 April
(Spain) Iberostar Tenerife	67
(Italy) Umana Reyer Venezia	58

Final
30 April
(Turkey) Banvit	59
(Spain) Iberostar Tenerife	63
Third place game
30 April
(France) Monaco	91
(Italy) Umana Reyer Venezia	77

== Semifinals ==
=== Semifinal A ===
28 April 2017	Banvit (Turkey)	83–74	(France) Monaco	San Cristóbal de La Laguna
17:00 (GMT)	Scoring by quarter: 14–23, 22–22, 18–8, 28–21
	Pts: Theodore 21; Rebs: Kulig, Vidmar 6 Asts: Theodore 11; PIR: Theodore 21	Report	Pts: Shuler 20; Rebs: Bost 7 Asts: Wright 5 PIR: Shuler 14	Arena: Santiago Martín; Attendance: 4,000; Referees: Srđan Dožai (CRO), Marek Cmikiewicz (POL), Tomas Jasevičius (LTU)

Starters:			Pts	Reb	Ast
PG	25	(North Macedonia) Jordan Theodore	21	4	11
SG	21	(United States) Jeremy Chappell	10	1	1
SF	10	(Lithuania) Gediminas Orelik	16	5	0
PF	5	(Slovenia) Edo Murić	0	3	2
C	14	(Slovenia) Gašper Vidmar	12	6	0
Reserves:					
C	3	(Turkey) Doğukan Sönmez	DNP		
PF	7	(Poland) Damian Kulig	7	6	0
SF	8	(Turkey) Tolga Geçim	4	1	1
PG	9	(Turkey) Emir Gökalp	0	0	0
C	12	(Turkey) Metehan Akyel	DNP		
SF	13	(Turkey) Merthan Mutlu	DNP		
SG	22	(Turkey) Furkan Korkmaz	13	1	1
Head coach:
(Basketball Federation of Slovenia) Sašo Filipovski

Banvit	Monaco

Starters:			Pts	Reb	Ast
PG	3	(Bosnia and Herzegovina) Zack Wright	7	5	5
SG	23	(United States) Jamal Shuler	20	0	1
SF	11	(France) Jordan Aboudou	0	4	0
PF	22	(Azerbaijan) Nik Caner-Medley	9	6	1
C	21	(France) Bangaly Fofana	2	2	0
Reserves:					
PF	0	(United States) Brandon Davies	5	6	1
PG	1	(Bulgaria) Dee Bost	10	7	3
SF	5	(France) Amara Sy	2	2	0
SF	8	(Ukraine) Sergii Gladyr	8	1	3
PG	13	(France) Paul Rigot	0	0	0
SG	24	(France) Billy Ouattara	11	3	0
Head coach:
(Basketball Federation of Montenegro) Zvezdan Mitrović

=== Semifinal B ===
28 April 2017	Iberostar Tenerife (Spain)	67–58	(Italy) Umana Reyer Venezia	San Cristóbal de La Laguna
20:00 (GMT)	Scoring by quarter: 16–21, 24–13, 16–8, 11–16
	Pts: Abromaitis 19; Rebs: Abromaitis 9 Asts: Grigonis, White 3 PIR: Abromaitis 28	Report	Pts: Haynes 13; Rebs: Ejim 6 Asts: Ejim, Haynes 3 PIR: Haynes 12	Arena: Santiago Martín; Attendance: 4,854; Referees: Panagiotis Anastopoulos (GRE), Aleksandar Glišić (SRB), Ademir Zurapović (BIH)

Starters:			Pts	Reb	Ast
PG	00	(Spain) Rodrigo San Miguel	7	8	0
SG	5	(Argentina) Nicolás Richotti	3	0	1
SF	11	(Ireland) Will Hanley	0	4	0
PF	42	(Canada) Aaron Doornekamp	11	4	10
C	31	(Greece) Georgios Bogris	10	4	2
Reserves:					
C	7	(Senegal) Mamadou Niang	DNP		
PG	10	(Spain) Ferran Bassas	2	0	2
SF	12	(France) Tariq Kirksay	3	3	0
SF	13	(Lithuania) Marius Grigonis	3	0	0
C	17	(Spain) Fran Vázquez	4	3	1
PF	21	(United States) Tim Abromaitis	19	9	2
PG	34	(United States) Davin White	4	1	3
Head coach:
(Spanish Basketball Federation) Txus Vidorreta

Tenerife	Reyer Venezia

Starters:			Pts	Reb	Ast
PG	0	(Georgia (country)) MarQuez Haynes	13	4	3
SG	25	(United States) Tyrus McGee	6	2	0
SF	6	(Greece) Michael Bramos	7	1	2
PF	4	(Croatia) Hrvoje Perić	11	5	2
C	16	(Austria) Benjamin Ortner	4	5	0
Reserves:					
C	2	(United States) Jamelle Hagins	0	0	1
SF	3	(Canada) Melvin Ejim	3	6	3
SG	7	(Italy) Stefano Tonut	2	3	0
PG	8	(Italy) Vincenzo Taddeo	DNP		
PG	12	(Italy) Ariel Filloy	4	5	2
PF	14	(Italy) Tomas Ress	6	1	0
SF	22	(Italy) Jeffrey Viggiano	2	0	0
Head coach:
(Italian Basketball Federation) Walter De Raffaele

== Third place game ==
30 April 2017	Monaco (France)	91–77	(Italy) Umana Reyer Venezia	San Cristóbal de La Laguna
16:15 (GMT)	Scoring by quarter: 26–21, 21–12, 26–22, 18–22
	Pts: Davies 17; Rebs: Davies, Sy 7 Asts: Wright 8 PIR: Wright 20		Pts: Haynes, Hagins 13; Rebs: Bramos 7 Asts: Filloy 6 PIR: Filloy 14	Arena: Santiago Martín; Attendance: 4,000; Referees: Aleksandar Glišić (SRB), Markos Michaelides (SUI), Ademir Zurapović (BIH)

Starters:			Pts	Reb	Ast
PG	3	(Bosnia and Herzegovina) Zack Wright	11	4	8
SG	23	(United States) Jamal Shuler	8	1	5
SF	24	(France) Billy Ouattara	13	5	2
PF	5	(France) Amara Sy	12	7	0
C	0	(United States) Brandon Davies	17	7	2
Reserves:					
PG	1	(Bulgaria) Dee Bost	12	3	5
SF	8	(Ukraine) Sergii Gladyr	5	1	1
PF	11	(France) Jordan Aboudou	4	5	0
PG	13	(France) Paul Rigot	3	2	0
C	21	(France) Bangaly Fofana	6	0	0
Head coach:
(Basketball Federation of Montenegro) Zvezdan Mitrović

Monaco	Reyer Venezia

Starters:			Pts	Reb	Ast
PG	0	(Georgia (country)) MarQuez Haynes	13	0	3
SG	25	(United States) Tyrus McGee	9	6	3
F	6	(Greece) Michael Bramos	2	7	2
PF	4	(Croatia) Hrvoje Perić	0	4	2
C	16	(Austria) Benjamin Ortner	2	0	0
Reserves:					
C	2	(United States) Jamelle Hagins	13	2	0
SF	3	(Canada) Melvin Ejim	6	3	2
SG	7	(Italy) Stefano Tonut	7	1	0
PG	8	(Italy) Vincenzo Taddeo	0	0	0
PG	12	(Italy) Ariel Filloy	12	1	6
PF	14	(Italy) Tomas Ress	5	4	0
SF	22	(Italy) Jeffrey Viggiano	8	4	0
Head coach:
(Italian Basketball Federation) Walter De Raffaele

== Final ==
Iberostar Tenerife was enjoying its most successful season in the Liga ACB in club history as the club was in the first place of the regular season. Banvit were having a season in which the team won its first trophy by winning the Turkish Cup.

Playing at its home court, Tenerife won the game 63–59 behind Final Four MVP Marius Grigonis, who scored 18 points on 6 out of 10 three point shooting. Davin White added 14 points and 5 assists, while also hitting the most important three pointer of the game in the final minute. The league's MVP, Jordan Theodore, recorded 17 points and 9 assists for Banvit.

By winning the Champions League trophy, Tenerife was awarded with the prize money of €500,000.

30 April 2017	Iberostar Tenerife (Spain)	63–59	(Turkey) Banvit	San Cristóbal de La Laguna
19:15 (GMT)	Scoring by quarter: 16–12, 18–19, 17–15, 12–13
	Pts: Grigonis 18; Rebs: Bogris 6 Asts: White 5 PIR: White 15	Boxscore	Pts: Theodore 17; Rebs: Orelik 13; Asts: Theodore 4 PIR: Orelik, Theodore 16	Arena: Santiago Martín; Attendance: 5,050; Referees: Panagiotis Anastopoulos (GRE), Marek Cmikiewicz (POL), Srđan Dožai (CRO)

Starters:			Pts	Reb	Ast
PG	00	(Spain) Rodrigo San Miguel	9	3	1
SG	11	(Ireland) Will Hanley	0	0	1
SF	13	(Lithuania) Marius Grigonis	18	3	1
PF	42	(Canada) Aaron Doornekamp	3	5	2
C	31	(Greece) Georgios Bogris	2	6	1
Reserves:					
C	7	(Senegal) Mamadou Niang	6	4	0
SG	5	(Argentina) Nicolás Richotti	0	0	0
PG	10	(Spain) Ferran Bassas	3	0	0
SF	12	(France) Tariq Kirksay	4	3	2
C	17	(Spain) Fran Vázquez	4	4	0
PF	21	(United States) Tim Abromaitis	0	5	0
PG	34	(United States) Davin White	14	2	5
Head coach:
(Spanish Basketball Federation) Txus Vidorreta

Tenerife	Banvit

2016–17 BCL champions
Iberostar Tenerife
1st title

Starters:			Pts	Reb	Ast
PG	25	(North Macedonia) Jordan Theodore	17	9	4
SG	21	(United States) Jeremy Chappell	7	3	1
SF	10	(Lithuania) Gediminas Orelik	13	13	3
PF	5	(Slovenia) Edo Murić	0	1	0
C	14	(Slovenia) Gašper Vidmar	2	5	0
Reserves:					
C	3	(Turkey) Doğukan Sönmez	DNP		
PF	7	(Poland) Damian Kulig	13	2	0
SF	8	(Turkey) Tolga Geçim	3	2	0
PG	9	(Turkey) Emir Gökalp	DNP		
C	12	(Turkey) Metehan Akyel	DNP		
SF	13	(Turkey) Merthan Mutlu	0	0	0
SG	22	(Turkey) Furkan Korkmaz	4	2	3
Head coach:
(Basketball Federation of Slovenia) Sašo Filipovski

- Team captains (C): (Italy) Nicolás Richotti (Iberostar Tenerife) and (Slovenia) Gašper Vidmar (Banvit)
