= Mamadou Niang (basketball) =

Senegalese basketball player

No. 7 – CB Estudiantes
- Position: Center
- League: Primera FEB

Personal information
- Born: January 1, 1994 (age 32) Thiès, Senegal
- Listed height: 209 cm (6 ft 10 in)
- Listed weight: 107 kg (236 lb)

Career information
- NBA draft: 2016: undrafted
- Playing career: 2012–present

Career history
- 2012–2013: La Palma
- 2013–2019: Canarias
- 2019–2021: Real Betis
- 2021–2023: Covirán Granada
- 2023–2024: Orléans Loiret Basket
- 2024–2025: Fos Provence Basket
- 2026–present: Estudiantes

Career highlights
- Champions League champion (2017); FIBA Intercontinental Cup champion (2017)

Mamadou Niang Ndieye (born January 1, 1994) is a Senegalese professional basketball player for Movistar Estudiantes of the Spanish Primera FEB.

== Professional career ==
On April 30, 2017, Niang won the Basketball Champions League with Tenerife.

On July 19, 2019, Niang signed a three-year deal with Coosur Real Betis.

On August 21, 2022, he signed with Covirán Granada of the Spanish Liga ACB.
