= Tim Abromaitis =

Lithuanian-American basketball player

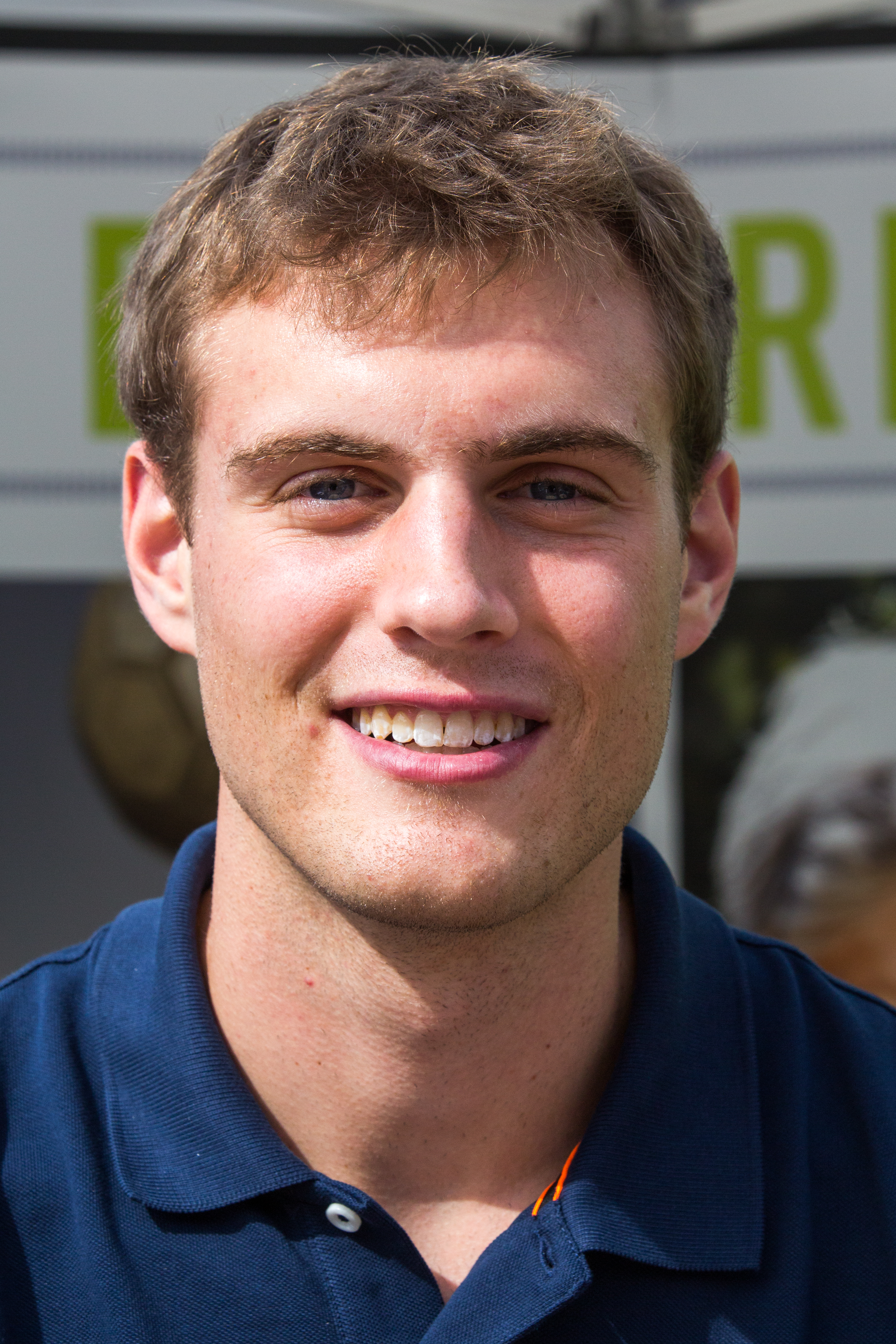
- Abromaitis in an official photo for Strasbourg IG in 2013

No. 21 – La Laguna Tenerife
- Position: Power forward
- League: Liga ACB

Personal information
- Born: September 17, 1989 (age 37) Waterbury, Connecticut, U.S.
- Listed height: 6 ft 8 in (2.03 m)
- Listed weight: 236 lb (107 kg)

Career information
- High school: Farmington (Farmington, Connecticut)
- College: Notre Dame (2007–2012)
- NBA draft: 2012: undrafted
- Playing career: 2012–present

Career history
- 2012–2013: ASVEL
- 2013–2014: SIG Strasbourg
- 2014–2015: Basketball Löwen Braunschweig
- 2015–2019: Tenerife
- 2019–2020: Zenit Saint Petersburg
- 2020–2022: Unicaja Málaga
- 2022–present: Tenerife

Career highlights
- FIBA Champions League champion (2017); All-FIBA Champions League First Team (2019); FIBA Champions League All-Decade Second Team (2026); 2× FIBA Intercontinental Cup champion (2017, 2023); 2x First-team Academic All-American (2010, 2011)
- Stats at Basketball Reference

Timothy James Abromaitis (born September 17, 1989) is a Lithuanian-American professional basketball player for La Laguna Tenerife of the Liga ACB and the EuroCup. He played college basketball at Notre Dame.

== Early life ==
Abromaitis was born in Waterbury, Connecticut and grew up in Unionville, Connecticut. He graduated from Farmington High School.

== College career ==
Abromaitis, a 6'8" forward, chose to play college basketball at Notre Dame and enrolled in 2007. He played sparingly as a freshman in 2007–08, then sat out his sophomore year to develop. In 2009–10, Abromaitis became a starter and averaged 16.1 points per game. The following season Abromaitis teamed with Ben Hansbrough to lead the Irish to a 27–7 record and a #2 seed in the 2011 NCAA Tournament. Abromaitis averaged 15.4 points and 6.1 rebounds per game on the season. After the season, he was suspended for four games for violating one of the NCAA rules back in 2009 season.

Abromaitis was poised for a strong senior year, but it was cut short after two games as he tore his anterior cruciate ligament on November 25, 2011. Following the season, Notre Dame petitioned the NCAA for a sixth year of eligibility, but the waiver request was denied.

In addition to his on-court play, Abromaitis was known for his success as a student-athlete. He was twice named a first team Academic All-American and was the first player to be named Big East Conference Scholar-athlete of the Year three times. He completed his undergraduate finance degree in three years and was able to complete a Master of Business Administration degree in 2010 at Notre Dame's Mendoza College of Business.

== Professional career ==
After failing to receive a sixth year of college eligibility and going undrafted in the 2012 NBA draft, Abromaitis signed with ASVEL Lyon-Villeurbanne in France's top league. He averaged 9.4 points and 4.4 rebounds per game. For the 2013–14 season he moved to Strasbourg IG, playing in LNB Pro A and Euroleague competition.

For the 2014–15 season, he played with Basketball Löwen Braunschweig in the highest German league.

On July 14, 2015, he signed with Iberostar Tenerife of the Spanish Liga ACB. On April 30, 2017, he won the 2017 Basketball Champions League Final Four.

On July 3, 2018, he re-signed with Iberostar Tenerife of the Spanish Liga ACB. In April 2019, he was named the Basketball Champions League quarterfinals MVP as he helped his team eliminate Hapoel Bank Yahav Jerusalem and advance to the Final Four.

On July 8, 2019, Abromaitis signed a two-year deal with Russian club Zenit Saint Petersburg. He averaged 7.5 points and 3.7 rebounds per game. In December 2019, he had to miss a few weeks of playing due to a leg muscle sprain which he suffered in the Turkish Airlines Euroleague win over Fenerbahce. On July 15, 2020, he signed a two-year deal with Unicaja of the Liga ACB.

On July 7, 2022, Abromaitis signed three-year contract with Lenovo Tenerife of the Liga ACB.

In November 2023, he became the all*time leader for games played in the European competition with 87 games played.

== National team career ==
In 2011, Abromaitis represented the United States in the 2011 Summer Universiade in China. He averaged 6.4 points and 4.3 rebounds in 8 games as the team finished in fifth place with a 7–1 record.

== Personal life ==
Tim's father, Jim, played collegiately for the University of Connecticut and for several overseas teams, notably Real Madrid and Pallacanestro Varese.

His older brother, Jason, played basketball at Yale University.

Abromaitis is of Lithuanian descent.

== Career statistics ==
=== Basketball Champions League ===
†	Denotes seasons in which Abromaitis won the BCL

Year	Team	GP	MPG	FG%	3P%	FT%	RPG	APG	SPG	BPG	PPG
2016–17†	Tenerife	20	22.0	.548	.455	.886	5.3	1.1	.8	.4	9.1
2017–18	Tenerife	16	21.9	.562	.561	.857	4.5	1.1	.8	.5	9.9
