= Jamar Diggs =

American basketball player (born 1988)

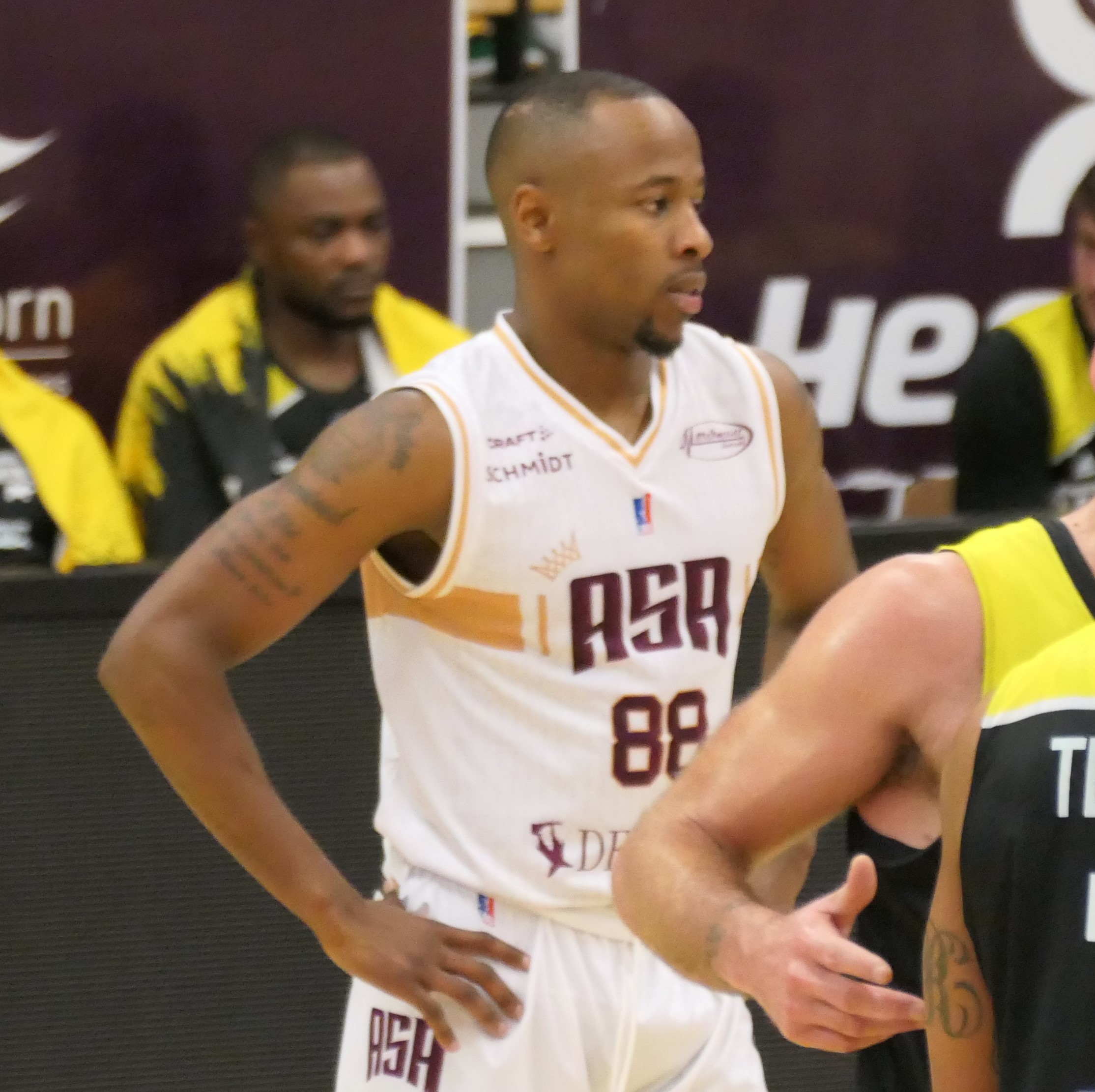
- Diggs with Alliance Sport Alsace in January 2023

AEK Larnaca
- Position: Point guard

Personal information
- Born: November 27, 1988 (age 37) Minneapolis, Minnesota, U.S.
- Listed height: 6 ft 2 in (1.88 m)
- Listed weight: 180 lb (82 kg)

Career information
- High school: DeLaSalle (Minneapolis, Minnesota)
- College: Wayne State (2006–2008); Wofford (2009–2011)
- NBA draft: 2011: undrafted
- Playing career: 2011–present

Career history
- 2011–2012: Paderborn Baskets
- 2012: Omonia
- 2013: Barons/LDz
- 2013–2014: APOEL
- 2014: Sigal Prishtina
- 2014: Polski Cukier Toruń
- 2014–2015: Keravnos
- 2015–2016: Energia Rovinari
- 2016: BCM U Pitesti
- 2016–2017: Juventus Utena
- 2017–2018: Hermine de Nantes Atlantique
- 2018–2020: Rouen Métropole
- 2020–2022: Fos Provence Basket
- 2022–2023: Alliance Sport Alsace
- 2023–2024: Fos Provence Basket
- 2024-present: AEK Larnaca

Career highlights
- Cypriot Super Cup winner (2025); LNB Pro B champion (2021); Lithuanian League MVP (2017); Cypriot League champion (2014); 2× First-team All-SoCon (2010, 2011); Third-team All-SoCon (2010)

Jamar Anthony Diggs (born November 27, 1988) is an American professional basketball player.

== College career ==
Diggs played college basketball at Wayne State College and Wofford College. He graduated from Wofford College in 2011. As a Freshman at Wayne State College in Nebraska Diggs got off to hot start during the 2006–07 season. He was named Co-Newcomer of The Year averaging 10.0 points and 2.9 rebounds per game. As a Sophomore in the 2007–08 season he averaged 15.9 points, 5.7 rebounds, and 4.8 assists while also leading the team in scoring, assists, steals, as well as made field goals. During his last season at Wayne State College he ended on a high note with a very impressive conference tournament outburst including averages of 26 points, 8.5 rebounds, 2.5 steals, and 3.0 assists earning an All-Tournament spot. He sat out the 2008–09 season due to transfer rules after his transfer to Wofford college. As a junior in the 2009–10 season he was selected as Third Team-All Southern Conference while averaging 9.5 points and 2.9 rebounds per game. After a good conference tournament he was also First Team All Tournament in the SoCon. As a senior in 2010–11, Diggs averaged 12.6 points and 3.1 rebounds while again being named an All SoCon selection.

== Professional career ==
After going undrafted in the 2011 NBA draft, Diggs signed with the Paderborn Baskets. In 32 games he recorded 12.2 ppg (points per game), 3.3 rpg (rebounds per game), 3.8 apg (assists per game) and 1.3 spg (steals per game) in 2011–12 season.

At the start of the 2012–13 season Diggs played for was Omonia (Division B). In 17 games he recorded very impressive stats: 15.3 ppg, 6.9 rpg (#4 in the league), 4.8 apg (top 2) and 2.1 spg (in top 3) in 2012–13 season. He contributed to his team making it to the Cypriot Cup Semifinals. Quite impressive season as he was named to Eurobasket.com All-Cyprus League 3rd Team.

Diggs played at BK Barons Kvartals in LBL for the remaining of the 2012–13 season. In 20 games he recorded 14.3 ppg, 3.7 rpg, 5.0 apg (top 3) and 1.0 spg in 2012–13 season. He helped them to make it to the semifinals. Diggs also played 8 games in Baltic League where he recorded 11.8 ppg, 3.6 rpg and 3.5 apg in 2012–13 season.

Diggs played at APOEL in the 2013–14 season, where he became a champion after winning the Cypriot 1st Division with the club. In 15 (regular season) league matches he recorded 9.7 ppg, 3.1 rpg, 3.1 apg (top 5) and 1.0 spg.

For the remaining of the 2013–14 season Diggs played at Sigal Prishtina. In three games he recorded 4.0 ppg, 1.0 rpg and 6.0 apg. He also played 3 games in Balkan League where he recorded just 2.7 ppg, 2.3 rpg and 2.0 apg.

He started the 2014–15 season at Twarde Pierniki Torun at Polish Basketball League. In 9 TBL games he had 8.8 ppg, 4.1 rpg and 4.2 apg.

He signed at Keravnos for the remaining of the 2014–15 season.

On August 10, 2016, Diggs signed with Lithuanian side BC Juventus for the 2016–17 season.

In 2017–2018, he played for Hermine de Nantes Atlantique.

In September 2020, Diggs signed with Fos Provence Basket of the LNB Pro B.
