= Emir Gökalp =

Turkish basketball player (born 1995)

Hasan Emir Gökalp
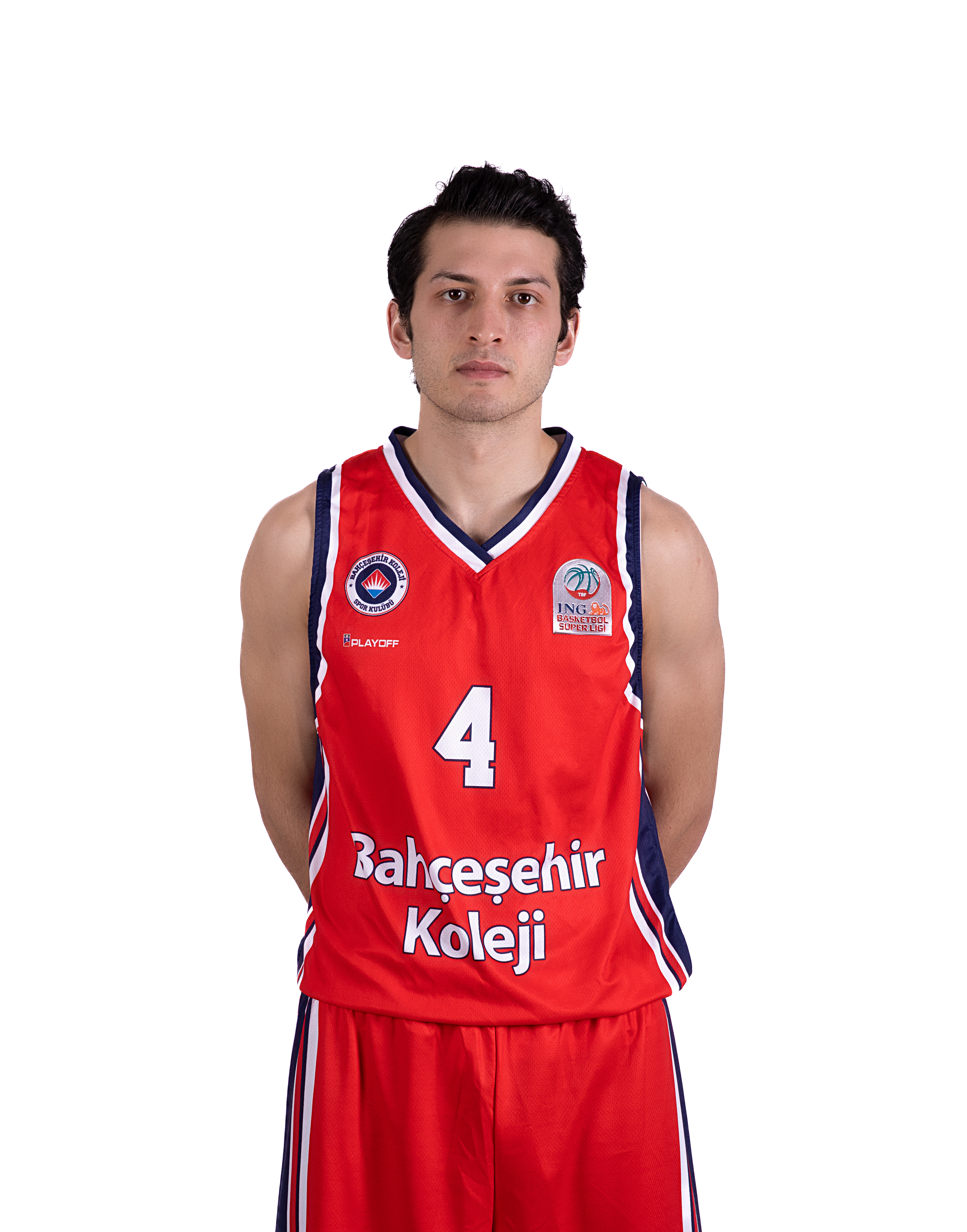

Free Agent
- Position: Point guard

Personal information
- Born: 12 October 1995 (age 31) İzmir, Turkey
- Listed height: 6 ft 1 in (1.85 m)
- Listed weight: 175 lb (79 kg)

Career information
- Playing career: 2012–present

Career history
- 2012–2016: Gelişim Koleji
- 2016: Bandırma Kırmızı
- 2016–2017: Banvit
- 2017–2018: Antalyaspor
- 2018–2020: Galatasaray Doğa Sigorta
- 2020–2021: Lokman Hekim Fethiye Belediyespor
- 2021: Semt77 Yalovaspor
- 2021–2023: Bahçeşehir Koleji
- 2023–2024: Gaziantep Basketbol
- 2025–2026: Manisa Basket

Hasan Emir Gökalp (born 12 October 1995) is a Turkish professional basketball player who plays as a Point guard.
