= 2016–17 Basketball Champions League =

UEFA Champions League Basketball Season

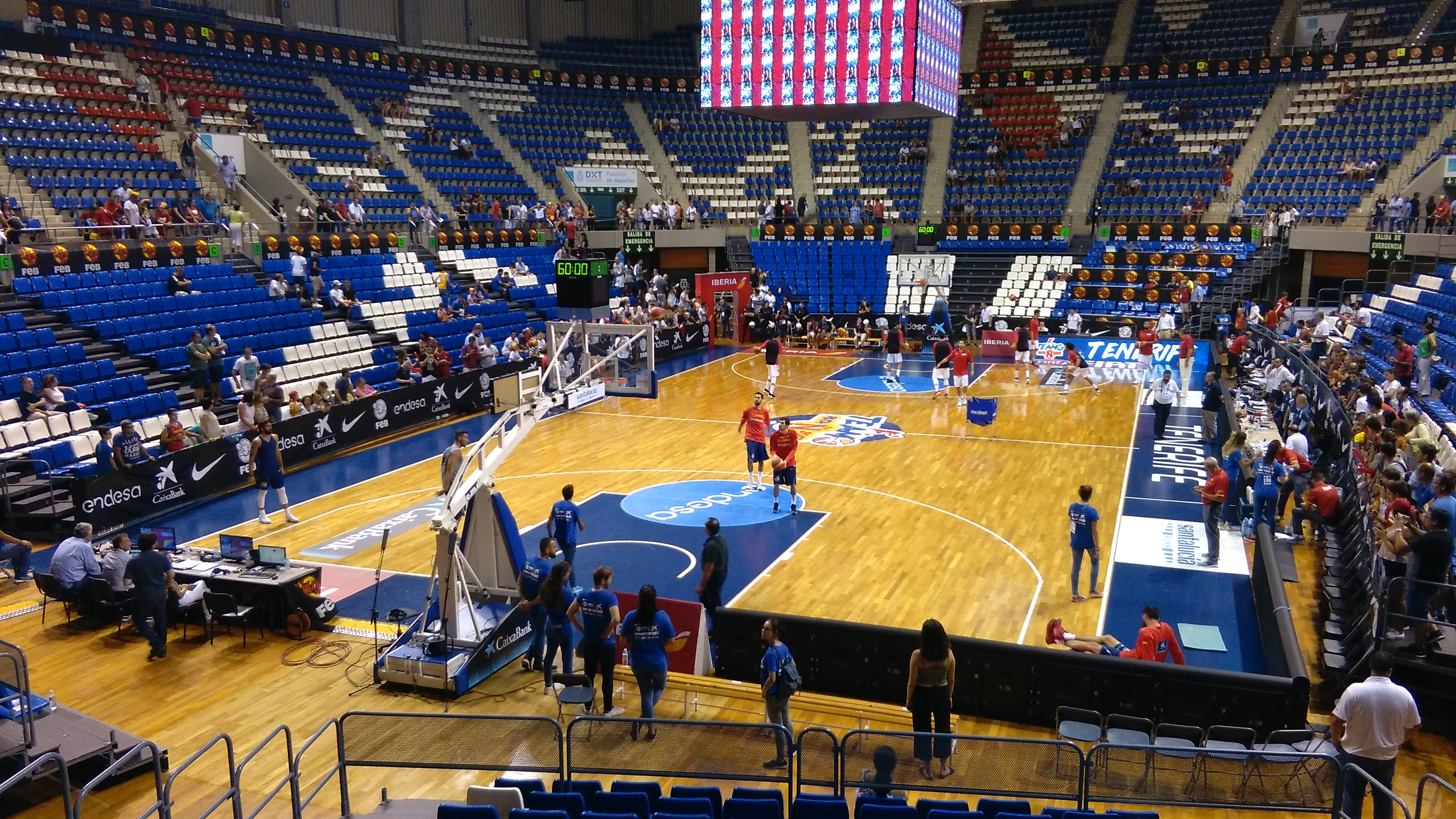
- The Pabellón Insular Santiago Martín in La Laguna hosted the 2017 Final Four
- Season: 2016–17
- Duration: 27 September – 6 October 2016 (qualifying); 20 October 2016 – 30 April 2017 (competition proper)
- Games played: 324
- Teams: 40 (regular season); 52 from 31 countries (total)

Regular season
- Season MVP: (North Macedonia) Jordan Theodore

Finals
- Champions: (Spain) Iberostar Tenerife (1st title)
- Runners-up: (Turkey) Banvit
- Third place: Monaco
- Fourth place: (Italy) Umana Reyer Venezia
- Final Four MVP: (Lithuania) Marius Grigonis

Statistical leaders
Points	(United States) Nick Minnerath	20.3
Rebounds	(United States) Keith Clanton	10.7
Assists	(North Macedonia) Jordan Theodore	7.5
Index Rating	(Serbia) Vladimir Štimac	19.9

Records
- Highest attendance: 8,000; Partizan 78–82 PAOK (22 February 2017)

Seasons
- 2017–18 →

The 2016–17 Basketball Champions League was the inaugural season of the Basketball Champions League (BCL), a European professional basketball competition for clubs that was launched by FIBA. The competition began on 27 September 2016, with the qualifying rounds, and concluded on 30 April 2017, at the Final Four. It featured 17 domestic champion teams and 9 runners-up.

A number of 52 teams from 31 countries participated in the competition, including its qualifying rounds. Iberostar Tenerife won the inaugural season of the BCL, after winning the final of the Final Four which was hosted in its home arena.

== Format ==
The competition format suffered multiple adjustments since its official presentation on 21 March 2016, in Paris. Initially, the tournament would feature a total of 56 teams from 30 national leagues. Thirty-two teams would compete in the regular season, which included 24 teams qualified directly through sporting criteria, and eight teams advancing from a two-round qualifying phase comprising the remaining 32 teams. The 24 qualifying round losers would be transferred to the regular season of the 2016–17 FIBA Europe Cup. The 32 regular season teams would be drawn into four groups of eight, playing home-and-away matches against the other group teams in a round-robin system. The four best-placed teams of each group would qualify for the play-offs, while the eight 5th- and 6th-placed teams would transfer to the FIBA Europe Cup play-offs. In the play-offs, the round of 16 and the quarter-finals were played as two-legged home-and-away ties. The four quarterfinal winners would play in the Final Four of the competition.

On 29 June 2016, the competition board confirmed the participation of 48 teams from 31 countries. The qualifying rounds would be contested by 24 teams, with 16 entering the first round, and the remaining eight given a bye to the second round. Ahead of the official draw ceremony on 21 July 2016, in Munich, the number of participating teams was increased to 49 and the qualifying rounds were again revised to accommodate 25 teams. The first qualifying round would include 18 teams divided into two pots according to geographical criteria. The nine winners would join the remaining seven teams directly placed in the second round.

On 19 August 2016, the organisation announced that AEK Athens, Dinamo Sassari, Partizan and Stelmet Zielona Góra had been accepted into the competition after withdrawing from the EuroCup. This expansion to 52 teams introduced overall changes in the competition format, namely the addition of a fifth group of eight teams (Group E) to the regular season. In addition, five teams were promoted from the qualifying rounds to this new regular season group, resulting in the promotion of eight teams from the first to the second qualifying round. The play-offs would also include an additional round before the round of 16, to accommodate an increase of qualified teams from 16 to 24 (four best-placed teams from each group and four best fifth-placed teams). The five group winners and three best runners-up from the regular season qualified directly for the round of 16, while the remaining 16 teams qualified for the preceding first round.

== Team allocation ==
A total of 52 teams from 31 countries (of which 17 were champions) participated in the 2016–17 Basketball Champions League.

=== Teams ===
The labels in the parentheses show how each team qualified for the place of its starting round (FEC: FIBA Europe Cup title holders):

- 1st, 2nd, 3rd, 4th, 5th, etc.: League position after eventual Playoffs
- CW: Cup winners

Regular season
(France) ASVEL (1st)	(Greece) Aris (4th)	(Belgium) Telenet Oostende (1st)	(Hungary) Szolnoki Olaj (1st)
(France) SIG Strasbourg (2nd)	(Greece) PAOK (5th)	(Belgium) Proximus Spirou (5th)	(Israel) Maccabi Rishon LeZion (1st)
Monaco (3rd)	(Italy) Sidigas Avellino (3rd)	(Poland) Stelmet Zielona Góra (1st)	(Latvia) Ventspils (3rd)
(France) Le Mans Sarthe (CW)	(Italy) Umana Reyer Venezia (4th)	(Poland) Rosa Radom (2nd)	(Lithuania) Neptūnas (2nd)
(Germany) Fraport Skyliners^{FEC} (3rd)	(Italy) Dinamo Sassari (7th)	(Serbia) Partizan NIS (2nd)	(Russia) Avtodor (6th)
(Germany) EWE Baskets Oldenburg (5th)	(Turkey) Banvit (5th)	(Serbia) Mega Leks (3rd)	(Slovenia) Helios Suns (1st)
(Germany) MHP Riesen Ludwigsburg (6th)	(Turkey) Pınar Karşıyaka (6th)	(Croatia) Cibona (2nd)	(Spain) Iberostar Tenerife (9th)
(Greece) AEK Athens (3rd)	(Turkey) Beşiktaş Sompo Japan (9th)	(Czech Republic) ČEZ Nymburk (1st)	(Ukraine) Khimik (1st)
Second qualifying round
(Portugal) Porto (1st)	(Bulgaria) Lukoil Academic (1st)	(Israel) Ironi Nahariya (6th)	(Montenegro) Mornar (2nd)
(Portugal) Benfica (2nd)	(Denmark) Bakken Bears (2nd)	(Italy) Openjobmetis Varese (9th)	(Sweden) Södertälje Kings (1st)
(Bosnia and Herzegovina) Igokea (1st)	(Finland) Kataja (5th)	(Lithuania) Juventus (4th)	(Turkey) Muratbey Uşak Sportif (7th)
First qualifying round
(Romania) Oradea (1st)	(Belarus) Tsmoki Minsk (1st)	(Cyprus) Petrolina AEK Larnaca (1st)	(Netherlands) Donar (1st)
(Romania) U-BT Cluj-Napoca (4th)	(Bulgaria) Rilski Sportist (3rd)	(Estonia) Tartu (2nd)	(Slovakia) Prievidza (1st)

Notes

1. France (FRA): Monaco are a club based in Monaco (which does not qualify for European competitions), but participated in European competitions through one of the berths for France (any coefficient points they earn count toward France).

== Round and draw dates ==
The schedule of the competition was as follows:

Phase	Round	Draw date	First leg	Second leg
Qualifying rounds	First qualifying round	21 July 2016	27 September 2016	29 September 2016
Qualifying rounds	Second qualifying round	21 July 2016	4 October 2016	6 October 2016
Regular season	Matchday 1	21 July 2016	18–19 October 2016	
Regular season	Matchday 2	21 July 2016	25–26 October 2016	
Regular season	Matchday 3	21 July 2016	1–2 November 2016	
Regular season	Matchday 4	21 July 2016	8–9 November 2016	
Regular season	Matchday 5	21 July 2016	15–16 November 2016	
Regular season	Matchday 6	21 July 2016	22–23 November 2016	
Regular season	Matchday 7	21 July 2016	29–30 November 2016	
Regular season	Matchday 8	21 July 2016	6–7 December 2016	
Regular season	Matchday 9	21 July 2016	13–14 December 2016	
Regular season	Matchday 10	21 July 2016	20–21 December 2016	
Regular season	Matchday 11	21 July 2016	3–4 January 2017	
Regular season	Matchday 12	21 July 2016	10–11 January 2017	
Regular season	Matchday 13	21 July 2016	17–18 January 2017	
Regular season	Matchday 14	21 July 2016	24–25 January 2017	
Play-offs	Play-offs qualifiers	27 January 2017	7–8 February 2017	21–22 February 2017
Play-offs	Round of 16	27 January 2017	28 February–1 March 2017	7–8 March 2017
Play-offs	Quarter-finals	10 March 2017	21–22 March 2017	28–29 March 2017
Final Four	Semi-finals	7 April 2017	28 April 2017	
Final Four	Final	7 April 2017	30 April 2017	

== Qualifying rounds ==
In the qualifying rounds, teams were divided into pots based on geographical criteria, and then drawn into two-legged home-and-away ties. Teams from the same league could not be drawn against each other. The losing teams from both qualifying rounds competed in the regular season of the 2016–17 FIBA Europe Cup.

=== First qualifying round ===
A total of 18 teams entering the first qualifying round were divided into two pots – Region A (ten teams) and Region B (eight teams) – and pairings were drawn between teams within each pot. Following the competition expansion in August, and the resulting format changes, only four of the nine originally drawn ties were played.

The first legs were played on 27 September, and the second legs were played on 29 September 2016.

Team 1	Agg.	Team 2	1st leg	2nd leg
Donar (Netherlands)	133–141	(Estonia) Tartu	76–76	57–65
Rilski Sportist (Bulgaria)	122–146	(Belarus) Tsmoki Minsk	58–72	64–74
Oradea (Romania)	144–131	(Slovakia) Prievidza	71–64	73–67
Petrolina AEK Larnaca (Cyprus)	106–145	(Romania) U-BT Cluj-Napoca	50–78	56–67

Source: Basketball Champions League

=== Second qualifying round ===
A total of 16 teams were scheduled to play the second qualifying round, including the nine winners of the first round and seven teams with a bye to this round. As in the previous round, teams were divided into pots according to geographical criteria – Region A teams in Pots 1 and 2; Region B teams in Pots 3 and 4 – and pairings were drawn between teams within each region.

Following the competition expansion in August, and the resulting format changes, the revised second qualifying round fixture list kept three ties from the original draw and included four ties transferred from the first round. The eighth tie featured Bakken Bears, who were promoted to the second qualifying round, after Dinamo Sassari were in turn promoted to the regular season.

The first legs of series with teams involved in the first qualifying round were played on 4 October, and the second legs were played on 6 October 2016. The other four series were played one week before, their first leg on 27 September, and their second one on 29 September.

Team 1	Agg.	Team 2	1st leg	2nd leg
Tartu (Estonia)	137–158	(Denmark) Bakken Bears	67–75	70–83
Tsmoki Minsk (Belarus)	133–141	(Israel) Ironi Nahariya	66–70	67–71
Lukoil Academic (Bulgaria)	133–142	(Romania) Oradea	75–72	58–70
Muratbey Uşak Sportif (Turkey)	178–156	(Romania) U-BT Cluj-Napoca	93–90	85–66
Kataja (Finland)	156–124	(Sweden) Södertälje Kings	97–58	59–66
Benfica (Portugal)	144–145	(Italy) Openjobmetis Varese	72–75	72–70
Porto (Portugal)	140–160	(Lithuania) Juventus	81–83	59–77
Igokea (Bosnia and Herzegovina)	131–152	(Montenegro) Mornar	71–69	60–83

Source: Basketball Champions League

== Regular season ==
Location of teams of the 2016–17 Basketball Champions League regular season.
Red: Group A; Green: Group B; Blue: Group C; Yellow: Group D; Orange: Group E.

The 40 regular season teams were drawn into five groups of eight, with the restriction that teams from the same league could not be drawn against each other. In each group, teams played against each other in home-and-away games, in a round-robin format. The group winners, runners-up, third-placed, fourth-placed, and the top 4 fifth-placed teams advanced to the round of 16, while the sixth-placed and the seventh-placed teams were eligible to enter the 2016–17 FIBA Europe Cup round of 16. The match-days were 18–19 October, 25–26 October, 1–2 November, 8–9 November, 15–16 November, 22–23 November, 29–30 November, 6–7 December, 13–14 December, 20–21 December 2016, 3–4 January, 10–11 January, 17–18 January and 24–25 January 2017.

=== Draw ===
The regular season groups were drawn on 21 July 2016. The 24 teams originally directly qualified were divided into six pots of four teams each.

Teams from the same country were drawn in different groups.

Pot 1
Team
(France) ASVEL
(France) Strasbourg
(Turkey) Banvit
(Turkey) Pınar Karşıyaka

Pot 2
Team
(Germany) Fraport Skyliners
(Germany) EWE Baskets Oldenburg
(Italy) Sidigas Avellino
(Italy) Umana Reyer Venezia

Pot 3
Team
(Greece) Aris
(Greece) PAOK
(Russia) Avtodor
(Spain) Iberostar Tenerife

Pot 4
Team
(Belgium) Telenet Oostende
(Israel) Maccabi Rishon LeZion
(Czech Republic) ČEZ Nymburk
(Lithuania) Neptūnas

Pot 5
Team
(Ukraine) Khimik
(Slovenia) Helios Suns
(Croatia) Cibona
(Poland) Rosa Radom

Pot 6
Team
(Serbia) Mega Leks
(Latvia) Ventspils
Monaco
(France) Le Mans Sarthe

=== Group A ===
Pos	Team	Pld	W	L	PF	PA	PD	Pts	Qualification	MON	BAN	ČEZ	ARI	FRA	NAH	HEL	BAK
1	Monaco	14	12	2	1034	919	+115	26	Advance to round of 16	—	65–63	93–74	80–66	65–47	71–64	59–55	105–86
2	(Turkey) Banvit	14	11	3	1130	1010	+120	25	Advance to round of 16	79–65	—	75–69	95–94	86–71	85–77	74–56	99–82
3	(Czech Republic) ČEZ Nymburk	14	10	4	1124	1005	+119	24	Advance to qualifiers	76–66	86–75	—	87–79	87–72	78–66	85–55	114–70
4	(Greece) Aris	14	8	6	1078	992	+86	22	Advance to qualifiers	62–65	84–78	83–79	—	58–64	85–58	72–54	82–66
5	(Germany) Fraport Skyliners	14	7	7	978	983	−5	21	Advance to qualifiers	64–70	70–86	74–61	81–74	—	81–64	72–62	102–68
6	(Israel) Ironi Nahariya	14	5	9	1013	1035	−22	19	Transfer to FIBA Europe Cup	67–73	70–83	83–86	53–85	75–54	—	76–61	101–62
7	(Slovenia) Helios Suns	14	2	12	834	947	−113	16		59–63	53–60	57–67	54–62	56–61	60–69	—	78–59
8	(Denmark) Bakken Bears	14	1	13	963	1263	−300	15		57–94	68–92	57–75	78–92	71–65	71–90	68–74	—

Source: Basketball Champions League
Legend: Blue = home team win; Red = away team win.

=== Group B ===
Pos	Team	Pld	W	L	PF	PA	PD	Pts	Qualification	MSB	VEN	KSK	AVT	MRL	ORA	KAT	KHI
1	(France) Le Mans Sarthe	14	9	5	1029	938	+91	23	Advance to round of 16	—	68–49	65–61	81–85	80–72	72–61	57–74	68–49
2	(Italy) Umana Reyer Venezia	14	9	5	1033	1030	+3	23	Advance to qualifiers	74–62	—	75–61	106–91	73–61	89–78	78–68	73–59
3	(Turkey) Pınar Karşıyaka	14	9	5	1046	963	+83	23	Advance to qualifiers	66–79	99–59	—	78–65	84–75	79–50	66–84	77–70
4	(Russia) Avtodor	14	7	7	1190	1147	+43	21	Advance to qualifiers	78–95	102–67	74–76	—	81–71	59–65	113–84	93–80
5	(Israel) Maccabi Rishon LeZion	14	7	7	1000	996	+4	21	Advance to qualifiers	73–65	79–61	78–69	74–98	—	69–56	69–88	74–48
6	(Romania) Oradea	14	6	8	959	1047	−88	20	Transfer to FIBA Europe Cup	60–79	69–73	56–69	96–85	69–64	—	101–91	69–66
7	(Finland) Kataja	14	6	8	1091	1131	−40	20	Transfer to FIBA Europe Cup	77–76	68–92	73–83	97–86	64–72	74–80	—	61–76
8	(Ukraine) Khimik	14	3	11	929	1025	−96	17		59–82	65–64	60–78	77–80	60–69	78–49	82–88	—

Source: Basketball Champions League
Legend: Blue = home team win; Red = away team win.

=== Group C ===
Pos	Team	Pld	W	L	PF	PA	PD	Pts	Qualification	ASV	NEP	OLD	PAO	VEN	UŞA	VAR	RAD
1	(France) ASVEL	14	10	4	1063	977	+86	24	Advance to round of 16	—	68–64	76–69	70–56	83–68	83–69	86–70	87–67
2	(Lithuania) Neptūnas	14	10	4	1051	958	+93	24	Advance to round of 16	81–67	—	69–73	68–63	84–68	103–88	94–60	66–63
3	(Germany) EWE Baskets Oldenburg	14	10	4	1070	983	+87	24	Advance to qualifiers	79–81	63–64	—	67–62	87–73	106–77	78–53	83–71
4	(Greece) PAOK	14	7	7	1031	990	+41	21	Advance to qualifiers	61–67	82–73	79–82	—	85–81	59–52	78–69	85–66
5	(Latvia) Ventspils	14	7	7	1061	1057	+4	21	Advance to qualifiers	77–72	66–61	76–77	54–84	—	97–86	91–66	74–53
6	(Turkey) Muratbey Uşak Sportif	14	5	9	1056	1092	−36	19	Transfer to FIBA Europe Cup	70–58	65–67	60–65	78–77	74–69	—	87–64	96–76
7	(Italy) Openjobmetis Varese	14	4	10	981	1123	−142	18		83–82	67–86	76–71	70–75	82–88	85–77	—	62–69
8	(Poland) Rosa Radom	14	3	11	959	1092	−133	17		63–83	65–71	66–70	93–85	63–79	83–77	61–74	—

Source: Basketball Champions League
Legend: Blue = home team win; Red = away team win.

=== Group D ===
Pos	Team	Pld	W	L	PF	PA	PD	Pts	Qualification	TFE	AVE	SIG	JUV	BCO	CIB	MEG	MOR
1	(Spain) Iberostar Tenerife	14	11	3	1135	948	+187	25	Advance to round of 16	—	66–78	66–70	79–57	64–57	106–84	73–59	103–57
2	(Italy) Sidigas Avellino	14	10	4	1048	961	+87	24	Advance to round of 16	75–76	—	72–69	74–64	72–77	75–57	85–61	53–60
3	(France) SIG Strasbourg	14	9	5	1069	977	+92	23	Advance to qualifiers	72–75	63–57	—	86–61	74–64	71–56	68–59	93–62
4	(Lithuania) Juventus	14	8	6	1066	1096	−30	22	Advance to qualifiers	71–93	75–85	91–84	—	81–71	104–82	85–78	82–74
5	(Belgium) Telenet Oostende	14	6	8	995	991	+4	20	Transfer to FIBA Europe Cup	66–62	73–78	65–66	59–69	—	82–70	82–74	80–60
6	(Croatia) Cibona	14	5	9	1082	1155	−73	19	Transfer to FIBA Europe Cup	57–85	83–84	93–88	81–72	71–77	—	87–77	90–72
7	(Serbia) Mega Leks	14	4	10	1016	1112	−96	18		73–98	70–84	86–82	77–79	76–70	81–79	—	60–53
8	(Montenegro) Mornar	14	3	11	962	1133	−171	17		72–89	67–76	70–83	73–75	74–72	81–92	87–85	—

Source: Basketball Champions League
Legend: Blue = home team win; Red = away team win.

=== Group E ===
Pos	Team	Pld	W	L	PF	PA	PD	Pts	Qualification	BJK	AEK	PAR	LUD	DSS	SPI	ZGA	SZO
1	(Turkey) Beşiktaş Sompo Japan	14	12	2	1178	1050	+128	26	Advance to round of 16	—	82–68	77–62	88–85	100–70	68–66	85–66	89–74
2	(Greece) AEK Athens	14	9	5	1107	992	+115	23	Advance to qualifiers	78–88	—	91–81	82–72	78–58	89–69	71–64	92–49
3	(Serbia) Partizan NIS	14	8	6	1038	1046	−8	22	Advance to qualifiers	86–71	65–69	—	86–82	87–88	70–84	58–56	77–67
4	(Germany) MHP Riesen Ludwigsburg	14	8	6	1150	1058	+92	22	Advance to qualifiers	89–83	72–67	64–65	—	75–78	88–66	87–77	99–56
5	(Italy) Dinamo Sassari	14	7	7	1099	1108	−9	21	Advance to qualifiers	74–75	80–78	99–85	79–80	—	95–75	74–70	97–88
6	(Belgium) Proximus Spirou	14	6	8	1040	1113	−73	20	Transfer to FIBA Europe Cup	75–92	58–80	63–65	78–96	63–57	—	86–69	92–87
7	(Poland) Stelmet Zielona Góra	14	4	10	1020	1084	−64	18	Transfer to FIBA Europe Cup	66–84	78–75	80–81	72–70	81–78	83–86	—	83–63
8	(Hungary) Szolnoki Olaj	14	2	12	1020	1201	−181	16		91–96	76–89	55–70	81–91	73–72	74–79	86–75	—

Source: Basketball Champions League
Legend: Blue = home team win; Red = away team win.

=== Ranking of second-placed teams ===
Pos	Grp	Team	Pld	W	L	PF	PA	PD	Pts	Qualification
1	A	(Turkey) Banvit	14	11	3	1130	1010	+120	25	Advance to round of 16
2	C	(Lithuania) Neptūnas	14	10	4	1051	958	+93	24	Advance to round of 16
3	D	(Italy) Sidigas Avellino	14	10	4	1048	961	+87	24	Advance to round of 16
4	E	(Greece) AEK Athens	14	9	5	1107	992	+115	23	Advance to qualifiers
5	B	(Italy) Umana Reyer Venezia	14	9	5	1033	1030	+3	23	Advance to qualifiers

Source: Basketball Champions League

=== Ranking of fifth-placed teams ===
Pos	Grp	Team	Pld	W	L	PF	PA	PD	Pts	Qualification
1	C	(Latvia) Ventspils	14	7	7	1061	1057	+4	21	Advance to qualifiers
2	B	(Israel) Maccabi Rishon LeZion	14	7	7	1000	996	+4	21	Advance to qualifiers
3	A	(Germany) Fraport Skyliners	14	7	7	978	983	−5	21	Advance to qualifiers
4	E	(Italy) Dinamo Sassari	14	7	7	1099	1108	−9	21	Advance to qualifiers
5	D	(Belgium) Telenet Oostende	14	6	8	995	991	+4	20	Transfer to FIBA Europe Cup

Source: Basketball Champions League

=== Ranking of seventh-placed teams ===
Pos	Grp	Team	Pld	W	L	PF	PA	PD	Pts	Qualification
1	B	(Finland) Kataja	14	6	8	1091	1131	−40	20	Transfer to FIBA Europe Cup
2	E	(Poland) Stelmet Zielona Góra	14	4	10	1020	1084	−64	18	Transfer to FIBA Europe Cup
3	D	(Serbia) Mega Leks	14	4	10	1016	1112	−96	18	
4	C	(Italy) Openjobmetis Varese	14	4	10	981	1123	−142	18	
5	A	(Slovenia) Helios Suns	14	2	12	834	947	−113	16	

Source: Basketball Champions League

== Playoffs ==
In the playoffs, teams played against each other over two legs, on a home-and-away basis. The round of 16 included two phases. For this stage, the winning team from each group and the three best runners-up qualified directly to the second phase. For the first phase, the remaining sixteen teams from the same country could not be drawn against each other. For the second phase, the draw was entirely random, without country protection, and the winners of the first phase played against the teams that directly qualified to the second phase. From the quarter-finals onward, the draw was entirely random, without country protection.

=== Bracket ===
Playoffs qualifiers
(Russia) Avtodor	87	89	176
(Germany) Oldenburg	84	98	182
(Israel) Maccabi R. LeZion	66	82	148
(Germany) Ludwigsburg	83	84	167
(Lithuania) Juventus	77	54	131
(Greece) AEK Athens	78	75	153
(Italy) Dinamo Sassari	94	63	157
(Czech Republic) ČEZ Nymburk	72	84	156
(Greece) Aris	71	70	141
(France) SIG Strasbourg	52	81	133
(Greece) PAOK	74	82	156
(Serbia) Partizan NIS	76	78	154
(Germany) Skyliners	90	52	142
(Turkey) Pınar Karşıyaka	80	72	152
(Latvia) Ventspils	74	61	135
(Italy) Reyer Venezia	67	70	137

Round of 16
(Germany) Oldenburg	82	61	143
(Turkey) Banvit	82	70	152
(Germany) Ludwigsburg	73	52	125
(Lithuania) Neptūnas	61	58	119
(Greece) AEK Athens	69	87	156
(France) Monaco	68	95	163
(Italy) Dinamo Sassari	79	68	147
(France) Le Mans Sarthe	63	66	129
(Greece) Aris	67	67	134
(France) ASVEL	67	81	148
(Greece) PAOK	66	54	120
(Spain) Tenerife	63	80	143
(Turkey) Pınar Karşıyaka	75	90	165
(Turkey) Beşiktaş	70	83	153
(Italy) Reyer Venezia	53	72	125
(Italy) Sidigas Avellino	49	68	117

Quarterfinals
(Turkey) Banvit	87	59	146
(Germany) Ludwigsburg	92	53	145
(France) Monaco	73	79	152
(Italy) Dinamo Sassari	62	76	138
(France) ASVEL	62	51	113
(Spain) Tenerife	62	61	123
(Turkey) Pınar Karşıyaka	74	66	140
(Italy) Reyer Venezia	71	74	145

Semifinals
(Turkey) Banvit	83
(France) Monaco	74
(Spain) Tenerife	67
(Italy) Reyer Venezia	58

Final
(Turkey) Banvit	59
(Spain) Tenerife	63
Third place
(France) Monaco	91
(Italy) Reyer Venezia	77

=== Playoffs qualifiers ===
The first legs were played on 7–8 February, and the second legs were played on 21–22 February 2017.

Team 1	Agg.	Team 2	1st leg	2nd leg
Aris (Greece)	141–133	(France) SIG Strasbourg	71–52	70–81
Ventspils (Latvia)	135–137	(Italy) Umana Reyer Venezia	74–67	61–70
Avtodor (Russia)	176–182	(Germany) EWE Baskets Oldenburg	87–84	89–98
Juventus (Lithuania)	131–153	(Greece) AEK Athens	77–78	54–75
PAOK (Greece)	156–154	(Serbia) Partizan NIS	74–76	82–78
Maccabi Rishon LeZion (Israel)	148–167	(Germany) MHP Riesen Ludwigsburg	66–83	82–84
Fraport Skyliners (Germany)	142–152	(Turkey) Pınar Karşıyaka	90–80	52–72
Dinamo Sassari (Italy)	157–156	(Czech Republic) ČEZ Nymburk	94–72	63–84

=== Round of 16 ===
The first legs were played on 28 February–1 March, and the second legs were played on 7–8 March 2017.

Team 1	Agg.	Team 2	1st leg	2nd leg
Aris (Greece)	134–148	(France) ASVEL	67–67	67–81
AEK Athens (Greece)	156–163	(France) Monaco	69–68	87–95
PAOK (Greece)	120–143	(Spain) Iberostar Tenerife	66–63	54–80
Dinamo Sassari (Italy)	147–129	(France) Le Mans Sarthe	79–63	68–66
MHP Riesen Ludwigsburg (Germany)	125–119	(Lithuania) Neptūnas	73–61	52–58
EWE Baskets Oldenburg (Germany)	143–152	(Turkey) Banvit	82–82	61–70
Umana Reyer Venezia (Italy)	125–117	(Italy) Sidigas Avellino	53–49	72–68
Pınar Karşıyaka (Turkey)	165–153	(Turkey) Beşiktaş Sompo Japan	75–70	90–83

=== Quarterfinals ===
The first legs were played on 21–22 March, and the second legs were played on 28–29 March 2017.

Team 1	Agg.	Team 2	1st leg	2nd leg
ASVEL (France)	113–123	(Spain) Iberostar Tenerife	62–62	51–61
Pınar Karşıyaka (Turkey)	140–145	(Italy) Umana Reyer Venezia	74–71	66–74
Banvit (Turkey)	146–145	(Germany) MHP Riesen Ludwigsburg	87–92	59–53
Monaco (France)	152–138	(Italy) Dinamo Sassari	73–62	79–76

== Final Four ==
The Final Four was the last phase of the season, and was held over a weekend. The semi-final games were played on Friday evening. Sunday started with the third-place game, followed by the championship game. The Final Four was played at the Santiago Martín in San Cristóbal de La Laguna, Spain, in April 2017.

Semifinals
28 April
(Turkey) Banvit	83
(France) Monaco	74
28 April
(Spain) Iberostar Tenerife	67
(Italy) Umana Reyer Venezia	58

Final
30 April
(Turkey) Banvit	59
(Spain) Iberostar Tenerife	63
Third place game
30 April
(France) Monaco	91
(Italy) Umana Reyer Venezia	77

== Awards ==
=== Most Valuable Player ===
Player	Team	Ref.
(North Macedonia) Jordan Theodore	(Turkey) Banvit	

=== Final Four MVP ===
Player	Team	Ref.
(Lithuania) Marius Grigonis	(Spain) Iberostar Tenerife	

=== Star Lineup ===
Position	Star Lineup Best Team		Star Lineup Second Best Team		Ref
Position	Player	Club	Player	Club	Ref
G	(North Macedonia) Jordan Theodore	(Turkey) Banvit	(United States) Will Hatcher	(Serbia) Partizan	
G	(Bosnia and Herzegovina) Zack Wright	Monaco	(United States) Chris Kramer	(Germany) EWE Baskets Oldenburg	
F	(Canada) Melvin Ejim	(Italy) Umana Reyer Venezia	(Lithuania) Gediminas Orelik	(Turkey) Banvit	
F	(Canada) Aaron Doornekamp	(Spain) Iberostar Tenerife	(Greece) Dušan Šakota	(Greece) AEK Athens	
C	(Greece) Georgios Bogris	(Spain) Iberostar Tenerife	(Serbia) Vladimir Štimac	(Turkey) Beşiktaş	

=== Best Young Player ===
Player	Team	Ref.
(Turkey) Furkan Korkmaz	(Turkey) Banvit	

=== Game Day MVP ===
==== Regular season ====
The winner of the Weekly MVP award is selected by the official website of the Basketball Champions League, championsleague.basketball. The winner of the award is mainly determined by the efficiency stat, but this is not the only deciding factor, as sometimes players who did not have the highest efficiency rating win the award.

Game Day	Player	Team	EFF	Ref.
1	(United States) Tyrone Brazelton	(Poland) Rosa Radom	30	
2	(United States) Joe Ragland	(Italy) Sidigas Avellino	29	
3	(Azerbaijan) Shaquielle McKissic	(Turkey) Muratbey Uşak Sportif	24	
4	(Greece) Vlado Janković	(Greece) Aris	25	
5	(United States) Nick Minnerath	(Russia) Avtodor	40	
6	(Greece) Georgios Bogris	(Spain) Iberostar Tenerife	28	
7	(Ukraine) Kyrylo Fesenko	(Italy) Sidigas Avellino	35	
8	(United States) Jimmy Baron	(Lithuania) Neptūnas	40	
9	(Serbia) Novica Veličković	(Serbia) Partizan NIS	21	
10	(Canada) Daniel Mullings	(Finland) Kataja	25	
11	(Greece) Zach Auguste	(Turkey) Muratbey Uşak Sportif	36	
12	(United States) Chris Kramer	(Germany) EWE Baskets Oldenburg	36	
13	(United States) Martin Zeno	(Romania) Oradea	40	
14	(United States) Nick Minnerath (2)	(Russia) Avtodor	27	

==== Playoffs Qualifiers MVP ====
Player	Team	Ref.
(United States) Thaddus McFadden	(Greece) PAOK	

==== Round of 16 MVP ====
Player	Team	Ref.
(United States) Mike Green	(Turkey) Pınar Karşıyaka	

==== Quarterfinals MVP ====
Player	Team	Ref.
(North Macedonia) Jordan Theodore	(Turkey) Banvit	

== Statistics ==
=== Statistical leaders ===
Category	Player	Team	Average
Efficiency	(Serbia) Vladimir Štimac	(Turkey) Beşiktaş Sompo Japan	19.9
Points	(United States) Nick Minnerath	(Russia) Avtodor	20.3
Rebounds	(United States) Keith Clanton	(Greece) PAOK	10.7
Assists	(North Macedonia) Jordan Theodore	(Turkey) Banvit	7.5
Steals	(Cuba) Howard Sant-Roos	(Czech Republic) ČEZ Nymburk	2.5
Blocks	(United States) Norvel Pelle	(Italy) Openjobmetis Varese	2.7
Turnovers	(United States) Kwame Vaughn	(Greece) PAOK	3.5
Fouls	(Lithuania) Vaidas Čepukaitis	(Lithuania) Juventus	4.1
Minutes	(United States) Chris Kramer	(Germany) EWE Baskets Oldenburg	36.2
FG%	(United States) Javon McCrea	(Israel) Maccabi Rishon LeZion	63.2
3P%	(Finland) Erik Murphy	(France) SIG Strasbourg	50.0
FT%	(United States) Nick Minnerath	(Russia) Avtodor	90.0
Double-doubles	(Serbia) Vladimir Štimac	(Turkey) Beşiktaş Sompo Japan	7

Source: BasketballCL

=== Individual game highs ===
Category	Player	Team	Statistic
Points	(United States) Jimmy Baron	(Lithuania) Neptūnas	42
Points	(United States) Martin Zeno	(Romania) Oradea	42
Rebounds	(United States) Keith Clanton	(Greece) PAOK	19
Assists	(United States) Scottie Reynolds	(Croatia) Cibona	17
Steals	(Azerbaijan) Shaquielle McKissic	(Turkey) Muratbey Uşak Sportif	7
Steals	(Serbia) Rade Zagorac	(Serbia) Mega Leks	7
Blocks	(Canada) Sean Denison	(Romania) Oradea	7
Blocks	(United States) Octavius Ellis	(Montenegro) Mornar	7
Three pointers	(United States) Jimmy Baron	(Lithuania) Neptūnas	10
Turnovers	(Ukraine) Viachelsav Petrov	(Ukraine) Khimik	11

Source: BasketballCL

== See also ==
- 2016–17 EuroLeague
- 2016–17 EuroCup Basketball
- 2016–17 FIBA Europe Cup
