= Jimmy Baron (basketball) =

American basketball player (born 1986)

San Antonio Spurs
- Position: Assistant coach
- League: NBA

Personal information
- Born: May 23, 1986 (age 40) East Greenwich, Rhode Island, U.S.
- Listed height: 6 ft 3 in (1.91 m)
- Listed weight: 196 lb (89 kg)

Career information
- High school: Bishop Hendriken (Warwick, Rhode Island)
- College: Rhode Island (2005–2009)
- NBA draft: 2009: undrafted
- Playing career: 2009–2020

Career history

Playing
- 2009–2010: Mersin
- 2010–2012: Lagun Aro GBC
- 2012–2013: Lokomotiv Kuban Krasnodar
- 2013–2014: Virtus Roma
- 2014–2015: Baloncesto Fuenlabrada
- 2015: Banvit
- 2015–2016: Spirou Charleroi
- 2016–2017: Neptūnas Klaipėda
- 2017–2018: Lietuvos rytas Vilnius
- 2018–2020: Champagne Châlons-Reims

Coaching
- 2023–present: San Antonio Spurs (shooting coach)

Career highlights
- Lithuanian League leading scorer (2017); Lithuanian League Best Foreign Player (2017); EuroCup champion (2013); First-team All-Atlantic 10 (2009)

James Edward Baron, Jr. (born May 23, 1986) is an American former professional basketball player, and current assistant coach for the San Antonio Spurs of the National Basketball Association (NBA). He played college basketball for the Rhode Island Rams. Standing at 6 ft 3 in (1.91 m), he mostly played at the shooting guard position.

== Professional career ==
He graduated from the University of Rhode Island in 2008 and known for his ability to take and make three-point shots. Jimmy Baron's little brother Billy Baron, played at Canisius college, where his father Jim Baron coaches. He currently holds many Atlantic 10 Conference records. For example, he is the all time Atlantic 10 leader in three-pointers made. He held the freshman record for most three-pointers made for five years, but it was broken in 2010 by Akeem Richmond. In 2009, he played in Turkey for Mersin, in the class A league.

Baron signed a contract with the Lokomotiv Kuban Krasnodar in the summer of 2012. With Lokomotiv Kuban he won the EuroCup in 2013.

On August 24, 2013, Baron signed a one-year contract with the Italian team Virtus Roma. In August 2014, he signed a one-year deal with Baloncesto Fuenlabrada. On January 13, 2015, he left Fuenlabrada. Three days later, he signed with the Turkish team Banvit for the rest of the season.

On August 4, 2015, he signed with the Belgian club Spirou Charleroi for the 2015–16 season.

On August 26, 2016, he signed with Lithuanian club Neptūnas. On December 6, 2016, Baron scored a record-setting 42 points and 10 three-point field goals in a 103–88 victory over Uşak Sportif in the Basketball Champions League. On February 9, 2017, Baron signed for the rest of the season with the Lithuanian team Lietuvos rytas Vilnius. On August 9, 2018, Baron signed with the French team Champagne Châlons-Reims. During the 2019–20 season he averaged 9.9 points and 1.5 assists per game, shooting 40% from beyond the arc. On September 27, 2020, Baron announced his retirement.

In 2023, Baron joined the San Antonio Spurs as a shooting coach. On August 18, 2025, Baron was promoted to the role of assistant coach/player development.
