= Marius Grigonis =

Lithuanian basketball player

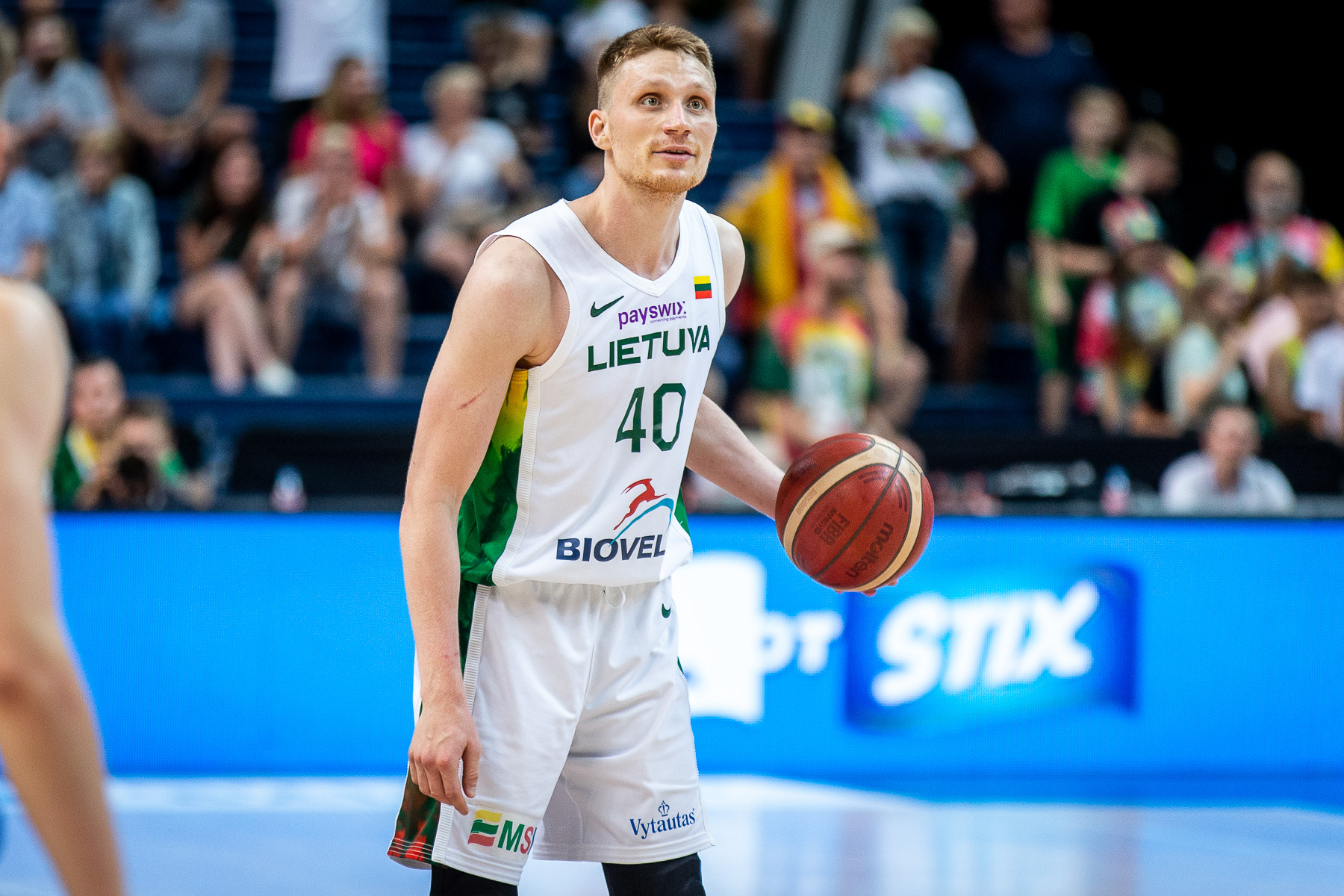
- Grigonis with the Lithuanian national team

No. 40 – Žalgiris Kaunas
- Position: Shooting guard / small forward
- League: LKL; EuroLeague

Personal information
- Born: 26 April 1994 (age 32) Kaunas, Lithuania
- Listed height: 2.02 m (6 ft 8 in)
- Listed weight: 205 lb (93 kg)

Career information
- NBA draft: 2016: undrafted
- Playing career: 2009–present

Career history
- 2009–2014: Žalgiris Kaunas
- 2009–2013: →Žalgiris-2
- 2013–2014: →Peñas Huesca
- 2014–2016: Manresa
- 2016–2017: Tenerife
- 2017–2018: Alba Berlin
- 2018–2021: Žalgiris Kaunas
- 2021–2022: CSKA Moscow
- 2022–2026: Panathinaikos
- 2026–present: Žalgiris Kaunas

Career highlights
- EuroLeague champion (2024); EuroLeague 50–40–90 club (2021); FIBA Champions League champion (2017); FIBA Champions League Final Four MVP (2017); Greek League champion (2024); 2× Greek Cup winner (2025, 2026); VTB United League Supercup winner (2021); 2× King Mindaugas Cup winner (2020, 2021); 3× Lithuanian League champion (2019–2021); All-Lithuanian League Team (2019); All-LEB Oro team (2014)
Medals
Men's basketball
Representing Lithuania
FIBA World Under-19 Championship
Bronze medal – third place	2013 Czech Republic	U-19 Team
FIBA Europe Under-18 Championship
Silver medal – second place	2012 Latvia/Lithuania	U-18 Team
FIBA Europe Under-16 Championship
Silver medal – second place	2010 Montenegro	U-16 Team

Marius Grigonis (born 26 April 1994) is a Lithuanian professional basketball player for Žalgiris Kaunas of the Lietuvos krepšinio lyga and the EuroLeague. Standing at a height of 2.02 m (6 ft 7 1/2 in), he plays at the shooting guard and small forward positions.

== Early career ==
Before starting his professional career, Grigonis played in the NKL with the Žalgiris-Arvydas Sabonis school for four seasons. He was an important contributor to the team during his debut season, and established himself as a leader by his third season. He won bronze medals during his last two seasons with the Sabonis school team.

== Professional career ==
On 15 May 2013, Grigonis was brought into the main Žalgiris roster for a game against BC Nizhny Novgorod in the VTB United League.

=== Playing in Spain (2013–2017) ===
For the 2013–14 season, Grigonis was loaned to the Spanish second division team Peñas Huesca. He was included in the All-LEB Oro team.

On 14 August 2014, Grigonis signed a two-year deal with Bàsquet Manresa of the Liga ACB. After spending two seasons with Manresa, he signed a "2+1" deal with Iberostar Tenerife on 28 July 2016. He was named the Final Four MVP of the Basketball Champions League 2016–17 season. On 13 July 2017, Grigonis parted ways with Tenerife.

=== Alba Berlin (2017–2018) ===
On 13 July 2017, he signed a three-year deal with German club Alba Berlin.

=== Return to Žalgiris (2018–2021) ===
On 3 July 2018, Grigonis returned to Žalgiris Kaunas when he signed a three-year contract. His season was cut short due to an injury in November 2019. Grigonis averaged 11.5 points, 2.6 rebounds and 2.0 assists per game in the first 10 games of the 2019–20 season. On 8 July 2020, he re-signed with the team.

=== CSKA Moscow (2021–2022) ===
On 12 June 2021, Grigonis signed a three-year contract with VTB United League champions and EuroLeague mainstays CSKA Moscow. He averaged 8.5 points, 1.4 rebounds and 1.9 assists per game during his first season the Russian powerhouse.

On 28 February 2022, upon the outbreak of the 2022 Russian invasion of Ukraine, he departed the club. The team accused him of violating his contract.

=== Panathinaikos (2022–2026) ===
On 14 July 2022, Grigonis signed a two-year contract with Panathinaikos of the Greek Basket League and the EuroLeague, after a settlement agreement between the Greek club and CSKA Moscow was reached.

Grigonis received an improved role in the team rotation during his second season, under the supervision of new head coach Ergin Ataman. On 8 April 2024, Grigonis agreed upon a three-year contract extension that would keep him with the Greek powerhouse through 2027. On July 11 of the same year, the deal was made official.

In the 2024–25 season, Marius Grigonis was sidelined for an extended period due to a serious back injury. He last played for Panathinaikos AKTOR Athens on October 17, 2024, during a EuroLeague Round 4 game against Real Madrid, where he was on the court for only 2 minutes and 24 seconds before exiting due to back pain.

Initially, Grigonis was expected to miss 4 to 6 weeks of action. However, his recovery was slower than anticipated, leading to a decision to undergo surgery. The surgery was performed on December 11, 2024, in Athens. Despite the procedure and ongoing rehabilitation efforts, Grigonis's back issues persisted, preventing him from returning to the court for the remainder of the season.

In the 2025–26 season, Grigonis made his return to the court on September 30, 2025, after 344 days out, playing 8 minutes in Panathinaikos’ 87–79 EuroLeague season opener victory over Bayern Munich. Upon entering the game, he received an enthusiastic ovation from the fans.

== National team career ==
Grigonis represented Lithuania in the U–16, U–18, U–19 and U–20 youth tournaments. He led his team to two silver medals and a bronze medal while participating in four tournaments. During the 2012 FIBA Europe Under-18 Championship semifinal game, he scored the winning shot against Serbia. As a result of his contributions to the team's success, he was chosen to be included in the All–Tournament Team. In 2014, coach Jonas Kazlauskas included Grigonis in the preliminary 24–player candidate list for the senior national basketball team. Though, he was invited to the national team training camp for the first time only in 2016 and immediately qualified into the Olympic roster.

== Career statistics ==
Legend
GP	Games played	GS	Games started	MPG	Minutes per game
FG%	Field-goal percentage	3P%	3-point field-goal percentage	FT%	Free-throw percentage
RPG	Rebounds per game	APG	Assists per game	SPG	Steals per game
BPG	Blocks per game	PPG	Points per game	PIR	Performance index rating
**Bold**	Career high

=== EuroLeague ===
†	Competition Winner
*	Led the league
Injured	50%+ of games missed due to injury

Year	Team	GP	GS	MPG	FG%	3P%	FT%	RPG	APG	SPG	BPG	PPG	PIR
2018–19	Žalgiris	34	18	20.8	.466	.442	.935	2.1	1.9	.6	—	8.7	9.3
2019–20	Žalgiris	10	10	25.7	.447	.386	.846	2.6	2.0	.5	.1	11.5	11
2020–21	Žalgiris	34	34	**27.6**	.481	**.456**	.944	2.1	**3.3**	**.8**	.1	**13.4**	**13.7**
2021–22	CSKA Moscow	16	3	19.4	.424	.431	**.917**	1.4	1.9	.6	—	8.5	7.4
2022–23	Panathinaikos	27	7	17.9	.435	.435	.840	1.6	1.6	.4	—	8.1	7.6
2023–24†	Panathinaikos	**41***	**36**	24.7	**.483**	.417	.900	**2.7**	1.3	.6	—	9.1	8.7
2024–25 (injured)	Panathinaikos	4	2	22.9	.333	.250	1.000	0.8	1.0	.0	.3	3.0	2.8
Career		166	110	22.4	.463	.430	.906	2.1	2.0	.6	.0	9.7	9.6

=== EuroCup ===
Year	Team	GP	GS	MPG	FG%	3P%	FT%	RPG	APG	SPG	BPG	PPG	PIR
2017–18	Alba Berlin	16	8	25.1	.449	.475	.897	3.1	2.6	.9	—	11.6	13.5
Career		16	8	25.1	.449	.475	.897	3.1	2.6	.9	—	11.6	13.5

=== Basketball Champions League ===
Year	Team	GP	GS	MPG	FG%	3P%	FT%	RPG	APG	SPG	BPG	PPG
2016–17†	Canarias	14	10	20.0	.460	.347	.825	2.1	2.0	.6	.1	9.3
Career		14	10	20.0	.460	.347	.825	2.1	2.0	.6	.1	9.3

=== Domestic leagues ===
Year	Team	League	GP	MPG	FG%	3P%	FT%	RPG	APG	SPG	BPG	PPG
2009–10	(Lithuania) Žalgiris-2	NKL	18	15.8	.382	.324	.786	1.8	.9	.7	.1	4.5
2010–11	(Lithuania) Žalgiris-2	NKL	14	8.3	.306	.273	.800	1.1	.4	.2	.1	2.3
2011–12	(Lithuania) Žalgiris-2	NKL	46	23.3	.494	.331	.808	3.6	2.2	**2.0**	**.9**	10.5
2012–13	(Lithuania) Žalgiris-2	NKL	**38**	29.0	.484	.419	.862	**5.0**	**3.0**	1.2	.1	13.9
2012–13	(Lithuania) Žalgiris	VTBUL	1	1.9	—	—	—	—	—	—	—	0.0
2013–14	(Spain) Peñas Huesca	LEB Oro	28	**25.8**	.491	.488	.829	2.9	2.0	.9	.2	**13.0**
2014–15	(Spain) Manresa	ACB	26	21.2	.416	.430	.714	3.2	.6	.4	.1	7.7
2015–16	(Spain) Manresa	ACB	34	25.2	.449	.394	.765	3.0	.9	.6	.1	9.7
2016–17	(Spain) Canarias	ACB	30	19.6	.385	.363	.857	1.4	2.0	.5	.1	6.2
2017–18	(Germany) Alba Berlin	BBL	47	24.7	.529	.469	.879	2.7	2.6	1.1	.1	12.0
2018–19†	(Lithuania) Žalgiris	LKL	40	20.4	.504	.368	.892	3.0	2.3	.7	.1	9.5
2019–20†	(Lithuania) Žalgiris	LKL	7	17.5	.405	.364	.909	1.9	1.7	.1	—	6.9
2020–21†	(Lithuania) Žalgiris	LKL	39	21.0	.527	.467	**.913**	2.0	3.4	1.0	.0	12.9
2021–22	(Russia) CSKA Moscow	VTBUL	10	19.0	**.554**	.512	.867	.6	2.0	.3	—	12.0
2022–23	(Greece) Panathinaikos	GBL	19	25.6	.437	.418	.778	2.9	2.7	.8	.0	12.4
2023–24†	(Greece) Panathinaikos	GBL	35	19.9	.524	**.513**	.875	2.4	1.6	.7	.0	9.2
2024–25 (injured)	(Greece) Panathinaikos	GBL	2	12.5	.615	.517	.833	2.5	1.0	1.0	.0	12.5
