= Zack Wright =

Bosnian basketball player

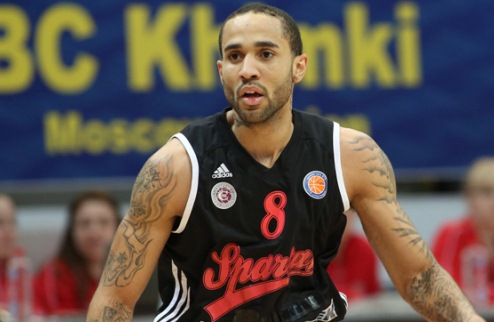
- Wright with Spartak in 2013

Personal information
- Born: February 5, 1985 (age 41) Austin, Texas
- Listed height: 6 ft 2 in (1.88 m)
- Listed weight: 195 lb (88 kg)

Career information
- High school: Ellison (Killeen, Texas)
- College: Little Rock (2003–2006); Central Missouri (2006–2007)
- NBA draft: 2007: undrafted
- Playing career: 2007–2021
- Position: Point guard / shooting guard
- Number: 3, 8, 19, 4

Career history
- 2007–2008: Braunschweig
- 2008–2009: Élan Chalon
- 2009–2010: Le Mans
- 2010–2011: Limoges CSP
- 2011–2012: Rethymno
- 2012: Cibona Zagreb
- 2012–2013: Spartak St. Petersburg
- 2013–2014: Brose Baskets
- 2014: Panathinaikos
- 2014–2015: İstanbul BB
- 2015–2016: Union Olimpija
- 2016: Avtodor Saratov
- 2016–2017: Monaco
- 2017–2018: SIG Strasbourg
- 2018–2021: JL Bourg

Career highlights
- FIBA BCL Star Lineup Best Team (2017); GBL champion (2014); French League Cup winner (2017); French Federation Cup winner (2018); 2× French League All-Star (2009, 2010); Croatian League champion (2012)

Zachary "Zach" Wright (born February 5, 1985) is an American-born naturalized Bosnian former professional basketball player. He played at both the point guard and shooting guard positions.

== Professional career ==
Wright's first team was SG Braunschweig of the German ProB. As a rookie pro, he led German Pro B in scoring (24.8) and steals (3.5).

This stint was followed by three seasons in the LNB Pro A in France: with Élan Chalon, Le Mans Sarthe, and Limoges CSP. Wright played at the French All-Star Game during the 2008–09 and 2010–11 seasons, and was named the slam dunk champion in the 2010–11 season.

In September 2011, he signed with Rethymno of the Greek League. He left them in March 2012, and signed with Cibona Zagreb of Croatia for the rest of the season. With Cibona he won the Croatian League

In July 2012, he signed a two-year deal with Spartak St. Petersburg of Russia. He left them after one season and signed with German EuroLeague team Brose Baskets. He left them in February 2014. On February 21, 2014, he signed with the Greek powerhouse Panathinaikos for the rest of the 2013–14 season.

In August 2014, Wright signed with İstanbul BB of Turkey for the 2014–15 season. On August 31, 2015, he signed a one-year deal with Union Olimpija of Slovenia. On March 3, 2016, he left Olimpija and signed with Avtodor Saratov of Russia for the rest of the season.

On August 9, 2016, Wright signed with AS Monaco for the 2016–17 season.

On July 14, 2017, Wright signed with SIG Strasbourg for the 2017–18 season.

On September 14, 2018, he signed with Pro A team JL Bourg.

== National team career ==
In 2012, Wright acquired Bosnian-Herzegovinian citizenship. He played with the senior Bosnia and Herzegovina national basketball team at the EuroBasket 2013.
