= Jordan Theodore =

American-Macedonian basketball player

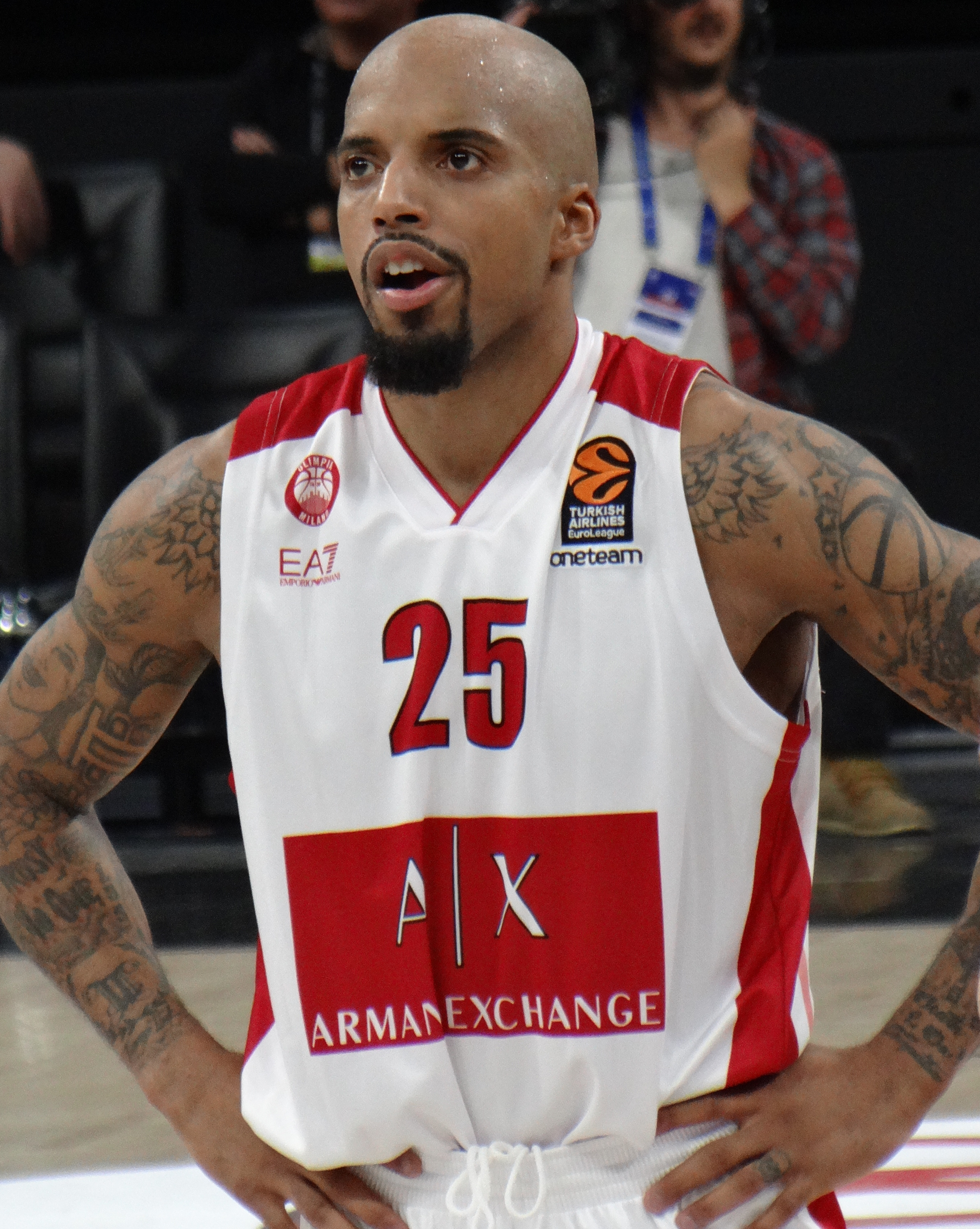
- Theodore with Olimpia Milano in 2017

Free agent
- Position: Point guard

Personal information
- Born: December 11, 1989 (age 36) Englewood, New Jersey, U.S.
- Listed height: 6 ft 0 in (1.83 m)
- Listed weight: 197 lb (89 kg)

Career information
- High school: Paterson Catholic (Paterson, New Jersey)
- College: Seton Hall (2008–2012)
- NBA draft: 2012: undrafted
- Playing career: 2012–present

Career history
- 2012–2013: Antalya BSB
- 2013: Mets de Guaynabo
- 2013: Huracanes del Atlántico
- 2013–2015: Mersin BSB
- 2015: JL Bourg
- 2015–2016: Skyliners Frankfurt
- 2016–2017: Banvit
- 2017–2018: Olimpia Milan
- 2019: AEK Athens
- 2019: Beşiktaş
- 2019–2021: UNICS Kazan
- 2022: Reyer Venezia
- 2022–2023: Samara
- 2023: Skyliners Frankfurt
- 2023–2024: Metropolitans 92
- 2024: Baskonia
- 2024–2025: Skyliners Frankfurt
- 2025–2026: Al Ahly

Career highlights
- FIBA Intercontinental Cup champion (2019); FIBA Intercontinental Cup MVP (2019); FIBA BCL Most Valuable Player (2017); All-BCL First Team (2017); FIBA BCL assists leader (2017); FIBA Europe Cup champion (2016); GBL All-Star (2019); Italian Supercup winner (2017); Italian Supercup MVP (2017); Turkish Cup winner (2017); Turkish Cup Final MVP (2017); TBSL All-Star (2017); TBSL assists leader (2017); All-German BBL Second Team (2016); Second-team All-Big East (2012)

Jordan Theodore (born December 11, 1989) is an American-born naturalized Macedonian professional basketball player who last played for Al Ahly of the Egyptian Basketball Premier League. He also represents the senior North Macedonia national team. He played college basketball at Seton Hall.

== High school career ==
Theodore grew up in Englewood, New Jersey, and attended and played high school basketball at Paterson Catholic High School.

== College career ==
Theodore played his entire college basketball career at Seton Hall University, with the Seton Hall Pirates. He finished his senior season with the Pirates, averaging 16.1 points per game and 6.6 assists per game. Theodore broke Golden Sunkett's single-season school record of 197 assists. He had 226 assists in his senior season. The previous record was set 49 years prior, in the 1962–63 season.

== Professional career ==
On July 15, 2012, Theodore signed to play with Antalya BSB of the Turkish BSL. On March 21, 2013, Theodore signed with the Adriatic League club Cedevita. A week later he was released, as his team, Antalya BSB, did not agree to release him.

In May 2013, Theodore has signed with Mets de Guaynabo, of Puerto Rico's top league, the BSN. On July 17, 2013, Theodore signed with Huracanes del Atlántico, of the Dominican League. On October 22, 2013, Theodore returned to the Turkish BSL, signing with Mersin BSB. He finished the Turkish League season with an average of 12.3 points per game, but didn't help the team to avoid relegation.

On January 12, 2015, he signed at JL Bourg-en-Bresse of the French LNB Pro A. On September 17, 2015, he signed with the German BBL team Fraport Skyliners. On July 28, 2016, Theodore signed with the Turkish club Banvit. In February, he won the Turkish Cup with Banvit. Theodore was named the Turkish Cup Final MVP.

Banvit also played in one of the two European-wide secondary leagues, the FIBA Champions League, as well, and in that competition, Theodore was named the Quarter-finals MVP, after his team defeated MHP Riesen Ludwigsburg, in a two-leg series. On April 30, Theodore was named the MVP of the FIBA Champions League's 2016–17 season.

On July 15, 2017, Theodore signed a two-year contract with the Italian LBA club Olimpia Milano. On September 24, 2017, Olimpia Milano won the 2017 Italian Supercup. Theodore was named tournament's MVP, after a game in which he had 29 points, 7 rebounds and 5 assists.

On January 4, 2019, Theodore signed a contract with the Greek Basket League club AEK Athens, which kept him at the club until the end of the 2018-19 Greek Basket League season.

On July 26, 2019, Theodore signed a contract with Beşiktaş Sompo Japan of the Basketbol Süper Ligi.

On December 27, 2019, Theodore signed a contract with UNICS Kazan of the VTB United League. He averaged 10.3 points, 4.5 rebounds and 7.7 assists per game. Theodore parted ways with the team on July 16, 2020.

On November 20, 2020, Theodore signed a new contract with UNICS Kazan of the VTB United League. On June 23, 2021, he signed with Alvark Tokyo of the Japanese B.League. However, he failed the physical and was released from the team.

On January 18, 2022, Theodore signed with Reyer Venezia of the Italian Lega Basket Serie A.

On April 4, 2023, he signed with Skyliners Frankfurt of the Basketball Bundesliga.

On August 12, 2023, he signed with Metropolitans 92 of the French LNB Pro A.

On January 24, 2024, he signed with Saski Baskonia of the Spanish Liga ACB and the EuroLeague.

On December 18, 2024, he signed with Skyliners Frankfurt of the Basketball Bundesliga.

On August 29, 2025, Theodore signed with Al Ahly of the Egyptian Basketball Premier League.

== National team career ==
Theodore gained Macedonian citizenship in 2017, so that he could represent the senior Macedonian national basketball team. With North Macedonia, he played at the 2019 FIBA World Cup European Qualification.

== Career statistics ==
Legend
GP	Games played	GS	Games started	MPG	Minutes per game
FG%	Field-goal percentage	3P%	3-point field-goal percentage	FT%	Free-throw percentage
RPG	Rebounds per game	APG	Assists per game	SPG	Steals per game
BPG	Blocks per game	PPG	Points per game	PIR	Performance index rating
**Bold**	Career high

=== EuroLeague ===
Year	Team	GP	GS	MPG	FG%	3P%	FT%	RPG	APG	SPG	BPG	PPG	PIR
2017–18	Olimpia Milano	**23**	**21**	**26.3**	.433	.294	**.865**	**2.0**	**4.3**	**.9**	.0	**11.6**	**11.0**
2023–24	Baskonia	12	1	9.8	**.556**	**.333**	.833	.7	1.1	.2	—	3.5	2.5
Career		35	22	20.6	.446	.297	.859	1.6	3.2	.6	.0	8.8	8.1

=== EuroCup ===
Year	Team	GP	GS	MPG	FG%	3P%	FT%	RPG	APG	SPG	BPG	PPG	PIR
2019–20	UNICS	6	6	25.0	.419	.250	**1.000**	2.2	**4.8**	1.2	—	8.7	11.3
2020–21	UNICS	**16**	**11**	21.2	.376	.233	.714	2.4	4.1	.6	—	6.4	8.4
2021–22	Reyer Venezia	8	8	**25.8**	**.478**	**.364**	.778	**3.1**	4.0	**1.8**	—	**13.1**	**14.6**
Career		30	25	23.2	.423	.291	.796	2.5	4.2	1.0	—	8.7	10.6

=== Basketball Champions League ===
Year	Team	GP	GS	MPG	FG%	3P%	FT%	RPG	APG	SPG	BPG	PPG
2016–17	Banvit B.K.	**17**	**17**	**32.6**	.418	.294	**.756**	**3.8**	'7.5	1.2	—	**15.9**
2018–19	AEK Athens	8	7	27.0	.365	.273	.714	2.4	4.5	1.4	**.1**	9.4
2019–20	Beşiktaş	9	9	31.0	**.432**	**.313**	.636	2.8	5.6	**2.0**	—	11.8
Career		34	33	30.8	.411	.295	.728	3.2	6.3	1.4	.0	13.3

=== FIBA Europe Cup ===
Year	Team	GP	GS	MPG	FG%	3P%	FT%	RPG	APG	SPG	BPG	PPG
2015–16	Skyliners Frankfurt	18	15	28.3	.437	.357	.902	3.4	4.6	1.7	.1	14.4
Career		18	15	28.3	.437	.357	.902	3.4	4.6	1.7	.1	14.4

=== Domestic leagues ===
Year	Team	League	GP	MPG	FG%	3P%	FT%	RPG	APG	SPG	BPG	PPG
2012–13	(Turkey) Antalya BB	TBL	30	30.7	.447	.321	.806	3.6	4.8	1.7	.1	16.1
2012–13	(Puerto Rico) Mets de Guaynabo	BSN	16	19.2	.359	.241	.687	1.9	2.7	.7	.1	9.7
2013–14	(Turkey) Mersin BB	TBL	27	30.9	.422	.297	.735	3.3	4.1	1.1	.1	12.3
2014–15	(France) JL Bourg	Pro A	17	27.4	.464	.216	.872	3.6	6.1	1.3	—	12.7
2015–16	(Germany) Skyliners Frankfurt	BBL	38	28.2	.432	.349	.834	3.5	4.7	1.5	—	14.8
2016–17	(Turkey) Banvit B.K.	TBSL	31	33.7	.460	.358	.812	3.7	7.2	1.2	—	18.3
2017–18	(Italy) Olimpia Milano	LBA	20	26.2	.415	.250	.750	2.9	2.8	1.2	—	10.4
2018–19	(Greece) AEK Athens	HEBA A1	20	23.2	.466	.327	.800	2.3	3.8	1.0	—	8.6
2019–20	(Turkey) Beşiktaş	TBSL	12	31.4	.431	.265	.850	2.7	6.8	1.1	—	13.7
2019–20	(Russia) UNICS	VTBUL	6	28.5	.480	.368	.700	4.5	7.7	1.0	.2	10.3
2020–21	(Russia) UNICS	VTBUL	15	23.6	.437	.286	.758	2.9	5.2	.9	—	8.2
2021–22	(Italy) Reyer Venezia	LBA	17	27.6	.404	.294	.844	3.3	4.1	1.1	—	12.6
2022–23	(Russia) Samara	VTBUL	20	28.6	.419	.320	.804	3.0	5.1	1.1	—	11.2
2022–23	(Germany) Skyliners Frankfurt	BBL	8	30.6	.464	.400	.783	2.5	5.4	1.6	—	18.0
2023–24	(France) Metropolitans	LNB Élite	12	27.4	.438	.283	.732	3.0	3.9	1.0	—	13.2
2023–24	(Spain) Baskonia	ACB	9	10.9	.370	.125	.750	.1	2.1	.1	—	3.0

=== College ===
Year	Team	GP	GS	MPG	FG%	3P%	FT%	RPG	APG	SPG	BPG	PPG
2008–09	Seton Hall	32	2	22.4	.388	.340	.768	1.6	2.0	.9	—	5.9
2009–10	Seton Hall	32	16	26.2	.419	**.365**	.736	2.4	3.5	1.5	**.3**	9.3
2010–11	Seton Hall	31	26	30.2	**.425**	.346	.787	**3.1**	4.4	1.3	.1	11.0
2011–12	Seton Hall	**34**	**34**	**36.1**	.389	.319	**.824**	**3.1**	**6.6**	**1.8**	.1	**16.1**
Career		129	78	28.8	.404	.338	.790	2.6	4.2	1.4	.1	10.6
