= Jamelle Hagins =

American basketball player (born 1990)

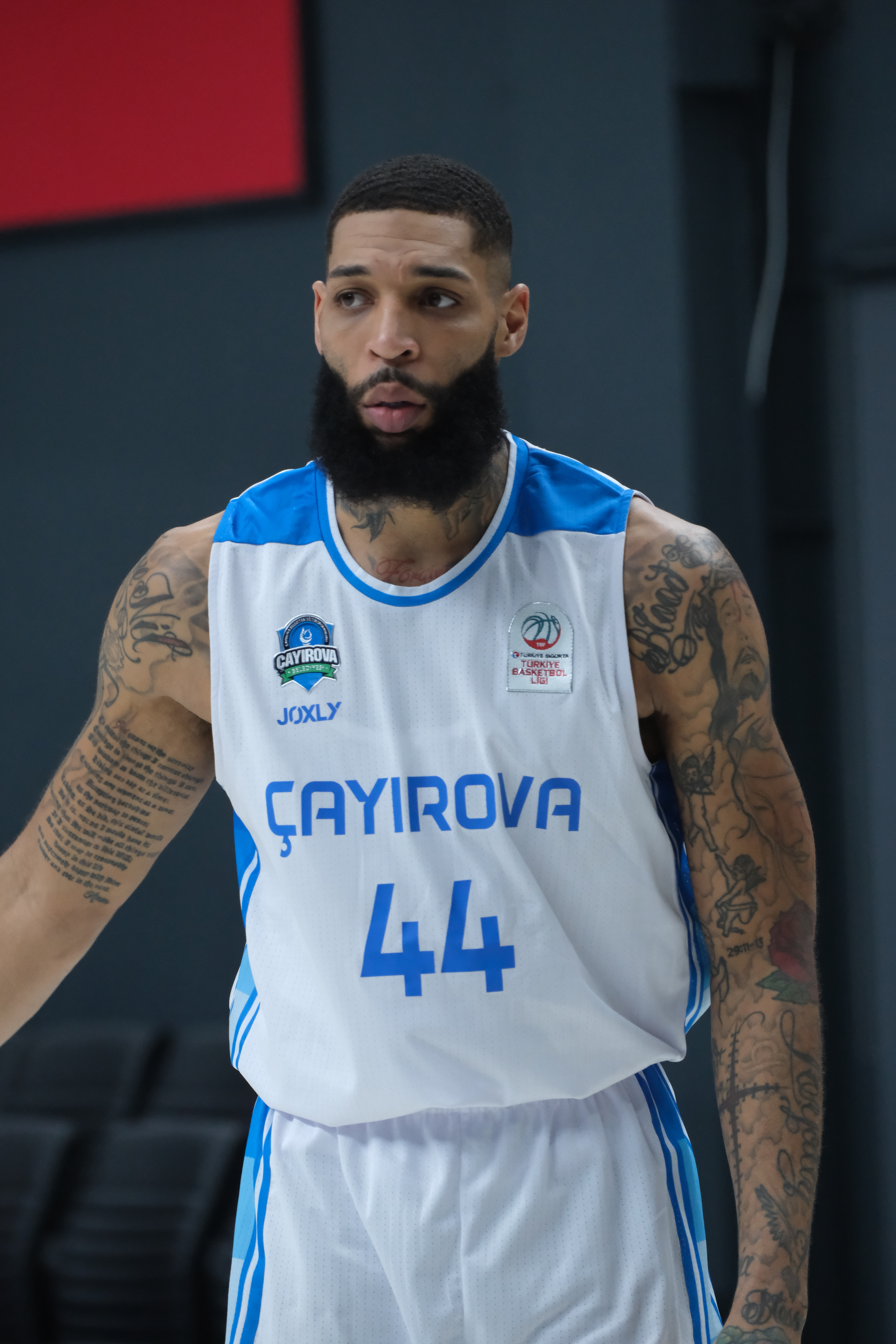
- Hagins with Çayırova Belediyespor in 2025

No. 33 – Club Africain
- Position: Center / power forward
- League: BAL

Personal information
- Born: October 19, 1990 (age 36) Roanoke, Virginia, U.S.
- Listed height: 6 ft 9 in (2.06 m)
- Listed weight: 240 lb (109 kg)

Career information
- College: Delaware (2009–2013)
- NBA draft: 2013: undrafted
- Playing career: 2013–present

Career history
- 2013–2014: Chorale Roanne
- 2014: Rio Grande Valley Vipers
- 2014–2015: Kolossos Rodou
- 2015–2016: Aris Thessaloniki
- 2016–2017: Reyer Venezia Mestre
- 2017–2019: Afyon Belediyespor
- 2019: Quimsa
- 2019–2020: Gaziantep Basketbol
- 2020–2021: Ormanspor
- 2021–2022: Mersin BB
- 2022: Guaiqueríes
- 2022–2024: Liège Basket
- 2024: Czarni Słupsk
- 2024–2025: Çayırova Belediyespor
- 2025–present: Club Africain

Career highlights
- Italian League champion (2017); 2× Second team All-CAA (2012, 2013); CAA Defensive Player Of The Year (2013)
- Stats at Basketball Reference

Jamelle William Hagins (born October 19, 1990) is an American professional basketball player for Club Africain of the Basketball Africa League (BAL). He has a 13-year international career spanning top leagues in France, Greece, Italy, Turkey, Belgium, Poland, Dubai, and Tunisia. A seasoned power forward and center, Hagins has won championships in Italy’s Lega Basket Serie A (LBA) and the Turkish Basketbol Süper Ligi, and has reached the Final Four in both the FIBA Europe Cup and the Basketball Champions League.

== College career ==
After high school, Hagins played college basketball at the University of Delaware, with the Delaware Fightin' Blue Hens, from 2009 to 2013.

== Professional career ==
Hagins began his professional career in France, in 2013, with the French Pro A League club Chorale Roanne. He then played with the NBA D-League team, the Rio Grande Valley Vipers, at the end of the 2013–14 season. During the 2014–15 season, he played with the Greek League club, Kolossos Rodou.

He moved to another Greek League club, Aris Thessaloniki, for the 2015–16 season.

On July 15, 2016, Hagins signed with Italian club Reyer Venezia Mestre.

On July 6, 2019, he has signed with Gaziantep of the Turkish Basketball Super League (BSL).

On January 6, 2020, he has signed with OGM Ormanspor of the Basketbol Süper Ligi (BSL). Hagins signed a one-year contract extension with the team on May 23.
