= 2021 Italian Basketball Supercup =

2021 Discovery+ Supercoppa

Tournament details
- Arena: Unipol Arena (Note: Final Eight); Casalecchio di Reno, Bologna, Italy
- Dates: 4–21 September 2021

Final positions
- Champions: Virtus Segafredo Bologna (2nd title)
- Runners-up: AX Armani Exchange Milano

Awards and statistics
- MVP: (Italy) Alessandro Pajola

The 2021 Italian Basketball Supercup (Italian: Supercoppa di pallacanestro 2021), also known as Discovery+ Supercoppa 2021 for sponsorship reasons, was the 27th edition of the super cup tournament, organized by the Lega Basket Serie A (LBA). The title was won by Virtus Segafredo Bologna, which defeated AX Armani Exchange Milano 90–84.

== Participant teams ==
Team	Home city	Arena	Capacity
Allianz Pallacanestro Trieste	Trieste	Allianz Dome	6,943
AX Armani Exchange Milano	Milan	Mediolanum Forum	12,700
Banco di Sardegna Sassari	Sassari	PalaSerradimigni	5,000
Carpegna Prosciutto Basket Pesaro	Pesaro	Vitifrigo Arena	10,323
Bertram Derthona Tortona	Tortona	Pala OltrePo	1,800
Dolomiti Energia Trento	Trento	BLM Group Arena	4,360
Fortitudo Bologna	Bologna	PalaDozza	5,570
Germani Brescia	Brescia	PalaLeonessa	5,200
Gevi Napoli	Naples	PalaBarbuto	5,500
Happy Casa Brindisi	Brindisi	PalaPentassuglia	3,534
NutriBullet Treviso Basket	Treviso	PalaVerde	5,134
Openjobmetis Varese	Varese	Enerxenia Arena	5,100
Umana Reyer Venezia	Venice	Palasport Taliercio	3,506
UNAHOTELS Reggio Emilia	Reggio Emilia	Unipol Arena	8,400
Vanoli Basket Cremona	Cremona	PalaRadi	3,511
Virtus Segafredo Bologna	Bologna	Segafredo Arena	9,700

== Group stage ==
=== Group A ===
Pos	Team	Pld	W	L	PF	PA	PD	Qualification
1	Umana Reyer Venezia	4	4	0	329	281	+48	Advance to Final Eight
2	UnaHotels Reggio Emilia	4	2	2	302	284	+18	
3	Fortitudo Bologna	4	0	4	270	336	−66	

Source: LegaBasket Serie A
Rules for classification: All points scored in extra period(s) were not counted in the standings, nor for any tie-break situation.

=== Group B ===
Pos	Team	Pld	W	L	PF	PA	PD	Qualification
1	Banco di Sardegna Sassari	4	4	0	350	304	+46	Advance to Final Eight
2	Vanoli Cremona	4	1	3	319	337	−18	
3	Openjobmetis Varese	4	1	3	299	327	−28	

Source: LegaBasket Serie A
Rules for classification: All points scored in extra period(s) were not counted in the standings, nor for any tie-break situation.

=== Group C ===
Pos	Team	Pld	W	L	PF	PA	PD	Qualification
1	NutriBullet Treviso Basket	4	4	0	323	296	+27	Advance to Final Eight
2	Gevi Napoli	4	1	3	293	307	−14	
3	Germani Brescia	4	1	3	322	335	−13	

Source: LegaBasket Serie A
Rules for classification: All points scored in extra period(s) were not counted in the standings, nor for any tie-break situation.

=== Group D ===
Pos	Team	Pld	W	L	PF	PA	PD	Qualification
1	Bertram Derthona Tortona	4	4	0	336	285	+51	Advance to Final Eight
2	Allianz Pallacanestro Trieste	4	2	2	326	345	−19	
3	Dolomiti Energia Trento	4	0	4	301	333	−32	

Source: LegaBasket Serie A
Rules for classification: All points scored in extra period(s) were not counted in the standings, nor for any tie-break situation.

== Final Eight ==
Quarterfinals; 18 September
1	Virtus Segafredo Bologna	74
8	Bertram Derthona Tortona	66
4	Carpegna Prosciutto Pesaro	51
5	Umana Reyer Venezia	83
2	AX Armani Exchange Milano	108
7	NutriBullet Treviso Basket	60
3	Happy Casa Brindisi	76
6	Banco di Sardegna Sassari	66

Semifinals; 20 September
1	Virtus Segafredo Bologna	72
5	Umana Reyer Venezia	71
2	AX Armani Exchange Milano	72
3	Happy Casa Brindisi	67

Final; 21 September
1	Virtus Segafredo Bologna	90
2	AX Armani Exchange Milano	84

== Quarterfinals ==
=== Carpegna Prosciutto Pesaro vs. Umana Reyer Venezia ===
18 September 2021	Carpegna Prosciutto Pesaro	51–83	Umana Reyer Venezia	Casalecchio di Reno, Bologna
12:00 (CEST)	Scoring by quarter: 11–20, 3–25, 22–23, 15–15
Discovery+, Eurosport, DMAX	Pts: Drell 9 Rebs: Camara 11; Asts: Sanford 8 PIR: Camara 19	Boxscore	Pts: Sanders 20; Rebs: Phillip 7 Asts: De Nicolao 6 PIR: Sanders 24	Arena: Unipol Arena; Referees: Carmelo Lo Guzzo, Michele Rossi, Denny Borgioni

=== Happy Casa Brindisi vs. Banco di Sardegna Sassari ===
18 September 2021	Happy Casa Brindisi	76–66	Banco di Sardegna Sassari	Casalecchio di Reno, Bologna
15:00 (CEST)	Scoring by quarter: 18–14, 16–11, 18–23, 24–18
Discovery+, Eurosport, DMAX	Pts: Perkins N. 21; Rebs: Perkins N. 10; Asts: Perkins J. 3 PIR: Perkins N. 23	Boxscore	Pts: Bendžius 17; Rebs: Bendžius, Burnell 6 Asts: Burnell 5 PIR: Bendžius, Burnell 17	Arena: Unipol Arena; Referees: Saverio Lanzarini, Alessandro Vicino, Denis Quarta

=== AX Armani Exchange Milano vs. NutriBullet Treviso Basket ===
18 September 2021	AX Armani Exchange Milano	108–60	NutriBullet Treviso Basket	Casalecchio di Reno, Bologna
18:00 (CEST)	Scoring by quarter: 36–20, 33–14, 17–13, 22–13
Discovery+, Eurosport, DMAX	Pts: Alviti 18; Rebs: Mitoglou 10; Asts: Delaney 4 PIR: Mitoglou 31	Boxscore	Pts: Bortolani 16; Rebs: Poser 5 Asts: Jones 3 PIR: Bortolani 10	Arena: Unipol Arena; Referees: Tolga Sahin, Guido Giovannetti, Fabrizio Paglialunga

=== Virtus Segafredo Bologna vs. Bertram Derthona Tortona ===
18 September 2021	Virtus Segafredo Bologna	74–66	Bertram Derthona Tortona	Casalecchio di Reno, Bologna
21:00 (CEST)	Scoring by quarter: 16–14, 20–22, 18–10, 20–20
Discovery+, Eurosport, DMAX	Pts: Hervey 18; Rebs: Hervey 18; Asts: Pajola 4 PIR: Hervey 32	Boxscore	Pts: Daum 19; Rebs: Filloy 7 Asts: Wright 9 PIR: Filloy 17	Arena: Unipol Arena; Referees: Manuel Mazzoni, Alessandro Martolini, Christian Borgo

== Semifinals ==
=== Happy Casa Brindisi vs. AX Armani Exchange Milano ===
20 September 2021	Happy Casa Brindisi	67–72	AX Armani Exchange Milano	Casalecchio di Reno, Bologna
18:00 (CEST)	Scoring by quarter: 15–21, 12–20, 29–10, 11–21
Discovery+, Eurosport, DMAX	Pts: Perkins N., Perkins J. 16; Rebs: Perkins N., Perkins J. 7 Asts: Perkins J. 4 PIR: Perkins N. 17	Boxscore	Pts: Mitoglou 13; Rebs: Hines 8 Asts: Rodríguez, Shields 3 PIR: Hines 23	Arena: Unipol Arena; Referees: Manuel Mazzoni, Lorenzo Baldini, Beniamino Attard

=== Umana Reyer Venezia vs. Virtus Segafredo Bologna ===
20 September 2021	Umana Reyer Venezia	71–72	Virtus Segafredo Bologna	Casalecchio di Reno, Bologna
21:00 (CEST)	Scoring by quarter: 11–20, 20–14, 16–16, 24–22
Discovery+, Eurosport, DMAX	Pts: Tonut 16; Rebs: Tonut 9 Asts: Tonut, De Nicolao 4 PIR: Tonut 21	Boxscore	Pts: Hervey 17; Rebs: Hervey 9 Asts: Teodosić 8 PIR: Teodosić 21	Arena: Unipol Arena; Referees: Roberto Begnis, Mark Bartoli, Valerio Grigioni

== Final ==
=== AX Armani Exchange Milano vs. Virtus Segafredo Bologna ===
21 September 2021	AX Armani Exchange Milano	84–90	Virtus Segafredo Bologna	Casalecchio di Reno, Bologna
21:00 (CEST)	Scoring by quarter: 20–23, 15–21, 20–23, 29–23
Discovery+, Eurosport, DMAX	Pts: Shields 19; Rebs: Melli 10; Asts: Delaney, Rodríguez 5 PIR: Hall 23	Boxscore	Pts: Jaiteh 18; Rebs: Jaiteh 9 Asts: Pajola 7 PIR: Jaiteh 27	Arena: Unipol Arena; Referees: Saverio Lanzarini, Michele Rossi, Guido Giovannetti

Starters:			Pts	Reb	Ast
PG	23	(United States) Malcolm Delaney	8	1	5
SF	31	(United States) Shavon Shields	19	5	1
SF	70	(Italy) Luigi Datome	0	1	0
PF	9	(Italy) Nicolò Melli	10	10	1
C	42	(United States) Kyle Hines	4	6	2
Reserves:					
PG	13	(Spain) Sergio Rodríguez	17	2	5
PF	17	(Italy) Giampaolo Ricci	3	1	1
C	19	(Italy) Paul Biligha	DNP		
SF	21	(Italy) Riccardo Moraschini	0	0	0
SG	22	(United States) Devon Hall	13	6	2
F/C	24	(Greece) Dinos Mitoglou	8	5	1
SF	40	(Italy) Davide Alviti	2	3	0
Head coach:
(Italian Basketball Federation) Ettore Messina

AX Armani Exchange Milano	Virtus Segafredo Bologna

Milano	Statistics	Bologna
20/42 (47.6%)	2 point field goals	25/41 (61.0%)
11/28 (39.3%)	3 point field goals	8/18 (44.4%)
11/11 (100.0%)	Free throws	16/23 (69.6%)
40	Rebounds	28
18	Assists	27
6	Steals	6
11	Turnovers	9
6	Blocks	4

Starters:			Pts	Reb	Ast
PG	6	(Italy) Alessandro Pajola	14	3	7
SG	3	(Italy) Marco Belinelli	9	1	2
SF	34	(United States) Kyle Weems	10	1	1
PF	8	(United States) Kevin Hervey	4	4	1
C	14	(France) Mouhammadou Jaiteh	18	9	3
Reserves:					
C	0	(Italy) Amedeo Tessitori	0	2	1
PF	7	(Bosnia and Herzegovina) Amar Alibegović	13	0	0
PG	11	(Italy) Michele Ruzzier	DNP		
SG	15	(United States) Ty-Shon Alexander	7	2	5
C	20	(Italy) Matteo Barbieri	DNP		
PG	44	(Serbia) Miloš Teodosić	9	3	6
SF	55	(Italy) Awudu Abass	6	1	1
Head coach:
(Italian Basketball Federation) Sergio Scariolo

2021 Italian Supercup champions
Virtus Segafredo Bologna
2nd title

== Sponsors ==
- Discovery + (title sponsor)
- UnipolSai (presenting sponsor)
- Fastweb (technology partner)
- Molten (official ball)
- BPER Banca (platinum sponsor)
- Frecciarossa (official train)
