= 2021–22 New Basket Brindisi season =

Italian basketball season

New Basket Brindisi
2021-22 season
- Owner: New Basket Brindisi S.p.A.
- President: Fernando Marino
- Head coach: Francesco Vitucci
- LBA: Regular season
- BCL: Regular season
- Supercup: Semifinals

The 2021–22 season is New Basket Brindisi's 30th in existence and the club's 4th consecutive season in the top tier of Italian basketball.

== Kit ==
Supplier: Adidas / Sponsor: Happy Casa

== Players ==
=== Current roster ===
Two captains were appointed for the season: Zanelli was the captain for the Serie A matches, while Chappell for the Champions League.

Happy Casa Brindisi roster
Players
Coaches

Pos.	No.	Nat.	Name	Ht.	Wt.	Age
PF	1	(United States)	Adrian, Nathan	2.06 m (6 ft 9 in)	107 kg (236 lb)	29 – 21 March 1995
SF	5	(Italy)	Gentile, Alessandro	2.01 m (6 ft 7 in)	100 kg (220 lb)	32 – 12 November 1992
PG	6	(Italy)	Zanelli, Alessandro (C)	1.88 m (6 ft 2 in)	82 kg (181 lb)	32 – 7 June 1992
SG	9	(Italy)	Visconti, Riccardo	1.97 m (6 ft 6 in)	84 kg (185 lb)	26 – 8 October 1998
PF	10	(Italy)	Gaspardo, Raphael	2.07 m (6 ft 9 in)	100 kg (220 lb)	31 – 3 August 1993
C	11	(Italy)	Ulaneo, Scott	2.05 m (6 ft 9 in)	100 kg (220 lb)	26 – 27 June 1998
G	12	(Argentina)	Redivo, Lucio	1.83 m (6 ft 0 in)	84 kg (185 lb)	31 – 14 February 1994
PF	14	(Belgium)	De Zeeuw, Maxime	2.06 m (6 ft 9 in)	115 kg (254 lb)	37 – 27 April 1987
G	15	(United States)	Clark, Wes	1.84 m (6 ft 0 in)	78 kg (172 lb)	30 – 12 December 1994
G	17	(Italy)	Guido, Alessandro	1.88 m (6 ft 2 in)	80 kg (176 lb)	22 – 3 October 2002
SG	21	(United States)	Chappell, Jeremy (C)	1.91 m (6 ft 3 in)	91 kg (201 lb)	37 – 10 June 1987
F	22	(Italy)	Udom, Mattia	2.00 m (6 ft 7 in)	104 kg (229 lb)	31 – 17 November 1993
F/C	33	(United States)	Perkins, Nick	2.03 m (6 ft 8 in)	113 kg (249 lb)	28 – 15 October 1996

Head coach

- (Italy) Francesco Vitucci

Assistant coach(es)

- (Italy) Alberto Morea
- (Italy) Mattia Consoli

Legend

- (C) Team captain
- Injured

- Roster
Updated: February 7, 2022

Note: Flags indicate national team eligibility at FIBA-sanctioned events. Players may hold other non-FIBA nationalities not displayed.

=== Depth chart ===
Pos.	Starting 5	Bench 1	Bench 2
C	Nick Perkins	Maxime De Zeeuw
PF	Nathan Adrian	Raphael Gaspardo	Scott Ulaneo
SF	Alessandro Gentile	Riccardo Visconti	Mattia Udom
SG	Jeremy Chappell	Lucio Redivo	Wes Clark
PG	Josh Perkins	Alessandro Zanelli	Alessandro Guido

(colours: Italian or homegrown players; foreign players; young players)

=== Squad changes ===
==== In ====
No.	Pos.	Nat.	Name	Age	Moving from		Type	Ends	Transfer fee	Date	Source
21	G/F	(United States)	Jeremy Chappell	34	Reyer Venezia	(Italy)	2 years	June 2023	Free	12 July 2021	
0	C	(United States)	Myles Carter	24	Budo Gemli̇k	(Turkey)	2 years	June 2023	Free	14 July 2021	
11	C	(Italy)	Scott Ulaneo	23	Davenport Panthers	(United States)	3 years	June 2024	Free	16 July 2021	
3	PG	(United States)	Josh Perkins	25	Partizan Belgrade	(Serbia)	1 years	June 2022	Free	17 July 2021	
1	PF	(United States)	Nathan Adrian	26	Mykolaiv	(Ukraine)	2 years	June 2023	Free	19 July 2021	
15	PG	(United States)	Wes Clark	26	Reyer Venezia	(Italy)	2 years	June 2023	Free	1 August 2021	
12	G	(Argentina) (Italy)	Lucio Redivo	27	Aguacateros de Michoacán	(Mexico)	short term		Free	17 August 2021	
14	PF	(Belgium)	Maxime De Zeeuw	34	Hapoel Holon	(Israel)	6 months	June 2022	Free	27 January 2022	

1. In players: Players who signed after the beginning of the season

==== Out ====
No.	Pos.	Nat.	Name	Age	Moving to		Type	Transfer fee	Date	Source
3	SF	(Italy) (Brazil)	Felipe Motta	18	Denver Pioneers	(United States)	Transfer	Free	14 May 2021	
00	G/F	(United States)	Josh Bostic	34	Free agent		End of contract	Free	1 July 2021	
5	F/C	(The Gambia) (United States)	Ousman Krubally	33	Larisa	(Greece)	End of contract	Free	1 July 2021	
7	SG	(United States)	D'Angelo Harrison	27	Prometey	(Ukraine)	End of contract	Free	1 July 2021	
15	PG	(United States)	Darius Thompson	26	Lokomotiv Kuban	(Russia)	End of contract	Free	1 July 2021	
18	C	(Italy)	Riccardo Cattapan	23	Derthona Basket	(Italy)	End of contract	Free	1 July 2021	
35	F	(United States)	Derek Willis	26	Joventut Badalona	(Spain)	End of contract	Free	1 July 2021	
31	SF	(United States)	James Bell	29	Anwil Włocławek	(Poland)	Mutual consent	Undisclosed	8 July 2021	
0	C	(United States)	Myles Carter	24	Keravnos	(Cyprus)	Mutual consent	Undisclosed	24 January 2022	
3	PG	(United States)	Josh Perkins	26	Petkim Spor	(Turkey)	Mutual consent	Undisclosed	7 February 2022	

1. Out players: Players who left before the end of the season

==== Confirmed ====
No.	Pos.	Nat.	Name	Age	Moving from		Type	Ends	Transfer fee	Date	Source
6	PG	(Italy)	Alessandro Zanelli	29	Legnano Basket Knights	(Italy)	2 + 2 years	June 2022	Free	5 June 2018	
10	PF	(Italy)	Raphael Gaspardo	27	Reggio Emilia	(Italy)	2 + 2 years	June 2023	Free	29 June 2019	
22	F	(Italy)	Mattia Udom	27	Scaligera Verona	(Italy)	2 years	June 2022	Free	20 July 2020	
9	SG	(Italy)	Riccardo Visconti	22	Pallacanestro Mantovana	(Italy)	2 years	June 2022	Free	21 July 2020	
17	G	(Italy)	Alessandro Guido	18	youth team				Free	25 July 2020	
33	F/C	(United States)	Nick Perkins	24	Niigata Albirex	(Japan)	1 + 2 year	June 2023	Free	9 August 2020	

==== Coach ====
Nat.	Name	Age.	Previous team		Type	Ends	Date	Source
(Italy)	Francesco Vitucci	58	Auxilium Torino	(Italy)	4 + 3	June 2024	14 December 2017	

== Competitions ==
=== Supercup ===
18 September 2021 Quarterfinals	Happy Casa Brindisi	76–66	Banco di Sardegna Sassari	Casalecchio di Reno, Bologna
15:00 (CEST)	Scoring by quarter: 18–14, 16–11, 18–23, 24–18
Discovery+, Eurosport, DMAX	Pts: Perkins N. 21; Rebs: Perkins N. 10; Asts: Perkins J. 3 PIR: Perkins N. 23	Boxscore	Pts: Bendžius 17; Rebs: Bendžius, Burnell 6 Asts: Burnell 5 PIR: Bendžius, Burnell 17	Arena: Unipol Arena; Referees: Saverio Lanzarini, Alessandro Vicino, Denis Quarta

20 September 2021 Semifinals	Happy Casa Brindisi	67–72	AX Armani Exchange Milano	Casalecchio di Reno, Bologna
18:00 (CEST)	Scoring by quarter: 15–21, 12–20, 29–10, 11–21
Discovery+, Eurosport, DMAX	Pts: Perkins N., Perkins J. 16; Rebs: Perkins N., Perkins J. 7 Asts: Perkins J. 4 PIR: Perkins N. 17	Boxscore	Pts: Mitoglou 13; Rebs: Hines 8 Asts: Rodríguez, Shields 3 PIR: Hines 23	Arena: Unipol Arena; Referees: Manuel Mazzoni, Lorenzo Baldini, Beniamino Attard

=== Serie A ===
Pos	Team	Pld	W	L	PF	PA	PD	Pts
9	Allianz Pallacanestro Trieste	30	14	16	2390	2464	−74	28
10	NutriBullet Treviso	30	12	18	2366	2509	−143	24
11	Happy Casa Brindisi	30	12	18	2440	2499	−59	24
12	Openjobmetis Varese	30	12	18	2470	2655	−185	24
13	Dolomiti Energia Trento	30	11	19	2345	2447	−102	22

Source: LBA

=== Basketball Champion League ===
==== Regular season ====
Pos	Team	Pld	W	L	PF	PA	PD	Pts	Qualification
1	(Romania) U-BT Cluj-Napoca	6	5	1	523	505	+18	11	Advance to round of 16
2	(Israel) Hapoel Holon	6	4	2	494	458	+36	10	Advance to play-ins
3	(Turkey) Darüşşafaka	6	2	4	459	470	−11	8	Advance to play-ins
4	(Italy) Happy Casa Brindisi	6	1	5	464	507	−43	7	

Source: Groups Standings
