= 2021–22 Dinamo Sassari season =

Italian basketball season

Dinamo Sassari
2021–22 season
- Owner: Polisportiva Dinamo s.r.l.
- President: Stefano Sardara
- Head coach: Piero Bucchi
- Arena: Palasport Roberta Serradimigni
- LBA: Regular season
- BCL: Regular season
- Supercup: Quarterfinals

The 2020–21 season is Dinamo Sassari's 62nd in existence and the club's 12th consecutive season in the top tier Italian basketball.

== Kit ==
Supplier: EYE Sport Wear / Sponsor: Banco di Sardegna

== Players ==
=== Current roster ===
Banco di Sardegna Sassari roster
Players
Coaches

Pos.	No.	Nat.	Name	Ht.	Wt.	Age
C	2	(Croatia)	Bilan, Miro	2.13 m (7 ft 0 in)	121 kg (267 lb)	37 – 21 July 1989
SG	3	(Poland)	Logan, David	1.85 m (6 ft 1 in)	77 kg (170 lb)	43 – 26 December 1982
G	4	(United States)	Robinson, Gerald	1.85 m (6 ft 1 in)	77 kg (170 lb)	37 – 10 February 1989
SG	6	(Croatia)	Krušlin, Filip	1.98 m (6 ft 6 in)	94 kg (207 lb)	37 – 18 March 1989
C	7	(Italy)	Gandini, Luca	2.06 m (6 ft 9 in)	110 kg (243 lb)	40 – 7 November 1985
G/F	8	(Italy)	Devecchi, Giacomo (C)	1.96 m (6 ft 5 in)	88 kg (194 lb)	41 – 2 April 1985
F	9	(Estonia)	Treier, Kaspar	2.04 m (6 ft 8 in)	105 kg (231 lb)	27 – 19 September 1999
G	10	(Italy)	Chessa, Massimo	1.88 m (6 ft 2 in)	80 kg (176 lb)	38 – 30 April 1988
SF	14	(United States)	Burnell, Jason	2.01 m (6 ft 7 in)	100 kg (220 lb)	29 – 15 August 1997
F	20	(Lithuania)	Bendžius, Eimantas	2.07 m (6 ft 9 in)	102 kg (225 lb)	36 – 23 April 1990
G	22	(Italy)	Gentile, Stefano	1.91 m (6 ft 3 in)	94 kg (207 lb)	37 – 20 September 1989
F/C	25	(Senegal)	Diop, Ousmane	2.04 m (6 ft 8 in)	100 kg (220 lb)	26 – 19 February 2000

Head coach

- (Italy) Piero Bucchi

Assistant coach(es)

- (Italy) Giacomo Baioni
- (Italy) Giorgio Gerosa

Legend

- (C) Team captain
- Injured

- Roster
Updated: April 6, 2022

Note: Flags indicate national team eligibility at FIBA-sanctioned events. Players may hold other non-FIBA nationalities not displayed.

=== Depth chart ===
Pos.	Starting 5	Bench 1	Bench 2
C	Miro Bilan	Luca Gandini
PF	Eimantas Bendžius	Ousmane Diop
SF	Jason Burnell	Kaspar Treier	Giacomo Devecchi
SG	David Logan	Stefano Gentile
PG	Gerald Robinson	Filip Krušlin	Massimo Chessa

(colours: Italian or homegrown players; foreign players; young players)

=== Squad changes ===
==== In ====
No.	Pos.	Nat.	Name	Age	Moving from		Type	Ends	Transfer fee	Date	Source
25	F/C	(Senegal) (Italy)	Ousmane Diop	21	Basket Torino	(Italy)	Return from loan	June 2022	Free	30 June 2021	
21	C	(Nigeria)	Christian Mekowulu	26	Universo Treviso Basket	(Italy)	1 year	June 2022	Free	6 July 2021	
23	G/F	(United States)	Tyus Battle	23	BC Enisey	(Russia)	1 year	June 2022	Free	9 July 2021	
3	SG	(Poland) (United States)	David Logan	38	Universo Basket Treviso	(Italy)	1 year	June 2022	Free	12 July 2021	
99	C	(Italy)	Jacopo Borra	31	Treviglio	(Italy)	1 year	June 2022	Free	26 July 2021	
5	PG	(United States)	Anthony Clemmons	26	KK Igokea	(Bosnia and Herzegovina)	1 year	June 2022	Free	28 July 2021	
6	SG	(Croatia)	Filip Krušlin	32	Dinamo Sassari	(Italy)	1 year	June 2022	Free	16 November 2021	
4	G	(United States)	Gerald Robinson	32	Niners Chemnitz	(Germany)	1 year	June 2022	Undisclosed	28 November 2021	
2	C	(Croatia)	Miro Bilan	32	Prometey	(Ukraine)	4 months	June 2022	Free	7 March 2022	

1. In players: Players who signed after the beginning of the season

==== Out ====
No.	Pos.	Nat.	Name	Age	Moving to		Type	Transfer fee	Date	Source
2	C	(Croatia)	Miro Bilan	31	Prometey	(Ukraine)	End of contract	Free	1 July 2021	
4	G	(Serbia)	Vasilije Pušica	25	Bàsquet Manresa	(Spain)	End of contract	Free	1 July 2021	
6	SG	(Croatia)	Filip Krušlin	32	Dinamo Sassari	(Italy)	End of contract	Free	1 July 2021	
7	F/C	(United States)	Ethan Happ	25	Riesen Ludwigsburg	(Germany)	End of contract	Free	1 July 2021	
10	PG	(Croatia)	Toni Katić	28	Cluj-Napoca	(Romania)	End of contract	Free	1 July 2021	
0	PG	(Italy)	Marco Spissu	26	UNICS Kazan	(Russia)	Transfer	100.000€	28 July 2021	
5	PG	(United States)	Anthony Clemmons	27	Türk Telekom	(Turkey)	Transfer	Undisclosed	10 November 2021	
99	C	(Italy)	Jacopo Borra	31	Fortitudo Bologna	(Italy)	Transfer	Undisclosed	3 December 2021	
23	G/F	(United States)	Tyus Battle	24	Hapoel Gilboa Galil	(Israel)	Transfer	Free	10 January 2022	
21	C	(Nigeria)	Christian Mekowulu	27	Casademont Zaragoza	(Spain)	Transfer	Free	5 April 2022	

1. Out players: Players who left before the end of the season

==== Confirmed ====
No.	Pos.	Nat.	Name	Age	Moving from		Type	Ends	Transfer fee	Date	Source
8	G/F	(Italy)	Giacomo Devecchi	36	Sutor Montegranaro	(Italy)	4 years	June 2023	Free	27 July 2006	
22	SG	(Italy)	Stefano Gentile	31	Virtus Bologna	(Italy)	2 + 3 year	June 2023	Free	25 June 2018	
14	SF	(United States)	Jason Burnell	24	Pallacanestro Cantù	(Italy)	1 + 1 year	June 2022	Free	12 June 2020	
9	F	(Estonia)	Kaspar Treier	21	Basket Ravenna	(Italy)	3 year	June 2023	Free	3 July 2020	
6	SG	(Croatia)	Filip Krušlin	31	Cedevita Olimpija	(Slovenia)	1 year	June 2021	Free	4 July 2020	
20	F	(Lithuania)	Eimantas Bendžius	31	Rytas Vilnius	(Lithuania)	2 years	June 2022	Free	7 July 2020	
7	C	(Italy)	Luca Gandini	35	Pallacanestro Varese	(Italy)	1 year	June 2021	Free	15 July 2020	
5	G	(Italy)	Massimo Chessa	33	Napoli Basket	(Italy)	End of season	June 2021	Free	14 January 2021	

1. Krušlin re-joined the team after being Free agent for the beginning of the season

==== Coach ====
Nat.	Name	Age.	Previous team		Type	Ends	Date	Replaces		Date	Type
(Italy)	Piero Bucchi	63	Pallacanestro Cantù	(Italy)	1 years	June 2022	16 November 2021	(Italy)	Demis Cavina	16 November 2021	Sacked
(Italy)	Demis Cavina	46	Basket Torino	(Italy)	2 years	June 2023	2 July 2021	(Italy)	Gianmarco Pozzecco	31 May 2021	Mutual consent

== Competitions ==
=== Supercup ===
==== Group stage ====
Pos	Team	Pld	W	L	PF	PA	PD	Qualification
1	Banco di Sardegna Sassari	4	4	0	350	304	+46	Advance to Final Eight
2	Vanoli Cremona	4	1	3	319	337	−18	
3	Openjobmetis Varese	4	1	3	299	327	−28	

Source: LegaBasket Serie A
Rules for classification: All points scored in extra period(s) were not counted in the standings, nor for any tie-break situation.

==== Playoffs ====
18 September 2021 Quarterfinals	Happy Casa Brindisi	76–66	Banco di Sardegna Sassari	Casalecchio di Reno, Bologna
15:00 (CEST)	Scoring by quarter: 18–14, 16–11, 18–23, 24–18
Discovery+, Eurosport, DMAX	Pts: Perkins N. 21; Rebs: Perkins N. 10; Asts: Perkins J. 3 PIR: Perkins N. 23	Boxscore	Pts: Bendžius 17; Rebs: Bendžius, Burnell 6 Asts: Burnell 5 PIR: Bendžius, Burnell 17	Arena: Unipol Arena; Referees: Saverio Lanzarini, Alessandro Vicino, Denis Quarta

=== Serie A ===
Pos	Team	Pld	W	L	PF	PA	PD	Pts	Qualification
4	Bertram Derthona Basket	30	17	13	2418	2412	+6	34	Qualification to Playoffs
5	Umana Reyer Venezia	30	17	13	2331	2297	+34	34	Qualification to Playoffs
6	Banco di Sardegna Sassari	30	17	13	2541	2449	+92	34	Qualification to Playoffs
7	UNAHOTELS Reggio Emilia	30	15	15	2409	2401	+8	30	Qualification to Playoffs
8	Carpegna Prosciutto Pesaro	30	14	16	2408	2518	−110	28	Qualification to Playoffs

Source: LBA

=== Basketball Champion League ===
==== Regular season ====
Pos	Team	Pld	W	L	PF	PA	PD	Pts	Qualification
1	(Germany) MHP Riesen Ludwigsburg	6	4	2	494	450	+44	10	Advance to round of 16
2	(Spain) Lenovo Tenerife	6	4	2	476	450	+26	10	Advance to play-ins
3	(Ukraine) Prometey	6	3	3	459	434	+25	9	Advance to play-ins
4	(Italy) Dinamo Sassari	6	1	5	421	516	−95	7	

Source: Groups Standings
