= 2021–22 Victoria Libertas Pesaro season =

Italian basketball season

Victoria Libertas Pesaro
2021-22 season
- President: Ario Costa
- Head coach: Luca Banchi
- Arena: Adriatic Arena
- LBA: Regular season
- Supercup: Quarterfinals

The 2020–21 season is Victoria Libertas Pesaro's 76th in existence and the club's 14th consecutive season in the top tier Italian basketball.

== Kit ==
Supplier: Erreà / Sponsor: Prosciutto Carpegna DOP

== Players ==
=== Current roster ===
Carpegna Prosciutto Pesaro roster
Players
Coaches

Pos.	No.	Nat.	Name	Ht.	Wt.	Age
F	5	(Latvia)	Mejeris, Mareks	2.07 m (6 ft 9 in)	95 kg (209 lb)	33 – 2 September 1991
G	7	(Italy)	Moretti, Davide	1.90 m (6 ft 3 in)	81 kg (179 lb)	26 – 25 March 1998
PG	15	(Italy)	Tambone, Matteo	1.92 m (6 ft 4 in)	87 kg (192 lb)	30 – 14 May 1994
SG	18	(Italy)	Stazzonelli, Umberto	1.95 m (6 ft 5 in)		21 – 12 February 2004
G/F	20	(United States)	Lamb, Doron	1.93 m (6 ft 4 in)	95 kg (209 lb)	33 – 6 November 1991
C	29	(Senegal)	Camara, Gora	2.14 m (7 ft 0 in)	115 kg (254 lb)	23 – 12 April 2001
PF	34	(Mali)	Dia, Mamoudou	2.00 m (6 ft 7 in)	96 kg (212 lb)	21 – 2 June 2003
PF	41	(Italy)	Zanotti, Simone	2.08 m (6 ft 10 in)	91 kg (201 lb)	32 – 31 December 1992
G	44	(United States)	Sanford, Vincent	1.93 m (6 ft 4 in)	90 kg (198 lb)	34 – 5 December 1990
PF	71	(Brazil)	Demétrio, Leonardo	2.10 m (6 ft 11 in)	105 kg (231 lb)	30 – 24 March 1994
G/F	82	(Argentina)	Delfino, Carlos (C)	2.03 m (6 ft 8 in)	104 kg (229 lb)	42 – 29 August 1982
PF	88	(United States)	Jones, Tyrique	2.06 m (6 ft 9 in)	108 kg (238 lb)	27 – 3 May 1997

Head coach

- (Italy) Luca Banchi

Assistant coach(es)

- (Italy) Bruno Savignani
- (Italy) Luca Pentucci

Legend

- (C) Team captain
- Injured

- Roster
Updated: March 9, 2022

Note: Flags indicate national team eligibility at FIBA-sanctioned events. Players may hold other non-FIBA nationalities not displayed.

=== Depth chart ===
Pos.	Starting 5	Bench 1	Bench 2
C	Tyrique Jones	Gora Camara
PF	Leonardo Demétrio	Simone Zanotti	Mamoudou Dia
SF	Doron Lamb	Mareks Mejeris
SG	Vincent Sanford	Carlos Delfino	Umberto Stazzonelli
PG	Davide Moretti	Matteo Tambone

(colours: Italian or homegrown players; foreign players; young players)

=== Squad changes ===
==== In ====
No.	Pos.	Nat.	Name	Age	Moving from		Type	Ends	Transfer fee	Date	Source
44	G	(United States)	Vincent Sanford	30	Élan Béarnais	(France)	1 year	June 2022	Free	17 July 2021	
9	PG	(Brazil)	Caio Pacheco	22	Murcia	(Spain)	1 year	June 2022	Free	18 July 2021	
71	PG	(Brazil)	Leonardo Demétrio	27	Flamengo	(Brazil)	1 year	June 2022	Free	19 July 2021	
29	C	(Senegal)	Gora Camara	20	Casale Monferrato	(Italy)	Loan from Virtus Bologna	June 2022	Undisclosed	24 July 2021	
7	G	(Italy)	Davide Moretti	23	Olimpia Milano	(Italy)	Loan contract	June 2022	Undisclosed	14 August 2021	
88	PF	(United States)	Tyrique Jones	24	Hapoel Tel Aviv	(Israel)	1 year	June 2022	Free	21 August 2021	
55	G	(United States)	Tyler Larson	29	Brose Bamberg	(Germany)	1 year	June 2022	Free	25 September 2021	
20	SG	(United States)	Doron Lamb	30	Start Lublin	(Poland)	1 year	June 2022	Undisclosed	24 November 2021	
5	F	(Latvia)	Mareks Mejeris	30	Parma Basket	(Russia)	4 months	June 2022	Free	9 March 2022	

1. In players: Players who signed after the beginning of the season

==== Out ====
No.	Pos.	Nat.	Name	Age	Moving to		Type	Transfer fee	Date	Source
4	PG	(United States)	Frantz Massenat	29	Saski Baskonia	(Spain)	End of contract	Free	5 May 2021	
5	PG	(Italy) (Argentina)	Ariel Filloy	34	Derthona Basket	(Italy)	End of contract	Free	1 July 2021	
8	C	(United States)	Tyler Cain	33	Derthona Basket	(Italy)	End of contract	Free	1 July 2021	
12	PG	(United States)	Justin Robinson	26	Brose Bamberg	(Germany)	End of contract	Free	1 July 2021	
21	SF	(Cameroon) (Italy)	Paul Eboua	21	Brescia Leonessa	(Italy)	End of contract	Free	1 July 2021	
35	PF	(Hungary)	Márkó Filipovity	24	Obradoiro	(Spain)	End of contract	Free	1 July 2021	
33	PF	(Italy)	Michele Serpilli	20	San Severo	(Italy)	Mutual consent	Undisclosed	20 July 2021	
9	PG	(Brazil)	Caio Pacheco	22	MKS Dąbrowa Górnicza	(Poland)	Transfer	Undisclosed	10 November 2021	
3	G/F	(Estonia)	Henri Drell	21	Free agent		Mutual consent	Undisclosed	30 November 2021	
55	G	(United States)	Tyler Larson	30	UnaHotels Reggio Emilia	(Italy)	Mutual consent	Undisclosed	27 February 2022	

1. Out players: Players who left before the end of the season

==== Confirmed ====
No.	Pos.	Nat.	Name	Age	Moving from		Type	Ends	Transfer fee	Date	Source
41	C	(Italy)	Simone Zanotti	28	San Crispino Basket P.S. Elpidio	(Italy)	2 + 2 years	June 2022	Free	11 July 2018	
3	G/F	(Estonia)	Henri Drell	21	Baunach Young Pikes	(Germany)	3 years	June 2022	Free	19 July 2019	
82	G/F	(Argentina) (Italy)	Carlos Delfino	38	Free agent		1 + 2 years	June 2023	Free	7 July 2020	
15	PG	(Italy)	Matteo Tambone	27	Pallacanestro Varese	(Italy)	1 year	June 2021	Free	22 July 2020	

==== Coach ====
Nat.	Name	Age.	Previous team		Type	Ends	Date	Replaces		Date	Type
(Italy)	Luca Banchi	56	Long Island Nets (assistant)	(United States)	1 year	June 2022	20 October 2021	(Croatia)	Aleksandar Petrović	19 October 2021	Resigned
(Croatia)	Aleksandar Petrović	62	Lietuvos Rytas	(Lithuania)	1 year	June 2022	16 July 2021	(Croatia)	Jasmin Repeša	21 May 2021	Exit option

== Competitions ==
=== Supercup ===
18 September 2021 Quarterfinals	Carpegna Prosciutto Pesaro	51–83	Umana Reyer Venezia	Casalecchio di Reno, Bologna
12:00 (CEST)	Scoring by quarter: 11–20, 3–25, 22–23, 15–15
Discovery+, Eurosport, DMAX	Pts: Drell 9 Rebs: Camara 11; Asts: Sanford 8 PIR: Camara 19	Boxscore	Pts: Sanders 20; Rebs: Phillip 7 Asts: De Nicolao 6 PIR: Sanders 24	Arena: Unipol Arena; Referees: Carmelo Lo Guzzo, Michele Rossi, Denny Borgioni

=== Serie A ===
Pos	Team	Pld	W	L	PF	PA	PD	Pts	Qualification
6	Banco di Sardegna Sassari	30	17	13	2541	2449	+92	34	Qualification to Playoffs
7	UNAHOTELS Reggio Emilia	30	15	15	2409	2401	+8	30	Qualification to Playoffs
8	Carpegna Prosciutto Pesaro	30	14	16	2408	2518	−110	28	Qualification to Playoffs
9	Allianz Pallacanestro Trieste	30	14	16	2390	2464	−74	28	
10	NutriBullet Treviso	30	12	18	2366	2509	−143	24	

Source: LBA
