= 2021–22 Derthona Basket season =

Italian basketball season

Derthona Basket
2021-22 season
- Owner: Derthona Basket S.S.D.
- President: Roberto Tava
- Head coach: Marco Ramondino
- Arena: PalaOltrepò
- LBA: Regular season
- Supercup: Quarterfinals

The 2021–22 season is Derthona Basket's 66th in existence and the club's 1st season in the top tier Italian basketball.

== Kit ==
Supplier: Erreà / Sponsor: Bertram

== Players ==
=== Current roster ===
Derthona Basket roster
Players
Coaches

Pos.	No.	Nat.	Name	Ht.	Wt.	Age
C	1	(Italy)	Mortellaro, Chris	2.08 m (6 ft 10 in)	105 kg (231 lb)	44 – 25 March 1982
PG	3	(United States)	Wright, Chris	1.85 m (6 ft 1 in)	91 kg (201 lb)	36 – 4 November 1989
F/C	5	(United States)	Cannon, Jalen	1.98 m (6 ft 6 in)	109 kg (240 lb)	33 – 5 May 1993
PG	8	(Italy)	Tavernelli, Riccardo (C)	1.90 m (6 ft 3 in)	82 kg (181 lb)	35 – 16 March 1991
PG	12	(Italy)	Filloy, Ariel	1.90 m (6 ft 3 in)	85 kg (187 lb)	39 – 11 March 1987
PG	14	(Italy)	Mascolo, Bruno	1.90 m (6 ft 3 in)	85 kg (187 lb)	30 – 4 March 1996
C	18	(Italy)	Cattapan, Riccardo	2.13 m (7 ft 0 in)	103 kg (227 lb)	29 – 5 July 1997
PF	20	(Italy)	Severini, Luca	2.04 m (6 ft 8 in)	95 kg (209 lb)	30 – 20 June 1996
SG	22	(United States)	Sanders, Jamarr	1.93 m (6 ft 4 in)	95 kg (209 lb)	38 – 2 August 1988
PF	24	(United States)	Daum, Mike	2.06 m (6 ft 9 in)	107 kg (236 lb)	30 – 30 October 1995
C	30	(United States)	Cain, Tyler	2.05 m (6 ft 9 in)	107 kg (236 lb)	38 – 30 June 1988
SG	55	(United States)	Macura, J.P.	1.96 m (6 ft 5 in)	93 kg (205 lb)	31 – 5 June 1995

Head coach

- (Italy) Marco Ramondino

Assistant coach(es)

- (Italy) Massimo Galli
- (Italy) Gianmarco Di Matteo
- (Italy) Vanni Talpo

Legend

- (C) Team captain
- Injured

- Roster
Updated: December 18, 2021

Note: Flags indicate national team eligibility at FIBA-sanctioned events. Players may hold other non-FIBA nationalities not displayed.

=== Depth chart ===
Pos.	Starting 5	Bench 1	Bench 2
C	Tyler Cain	Riccardo Cattapan	Chris Mortellaro
PF	Mike Daum	Luca Severini
SF	J.P. Macura	Jalen Cannon
SG	Jamarr Sanders	Ariel Filloy
PG	Chris Wright	Bruno Mascolo	Riccardo Tavernelli

(colours: Italian or homegrown players; foreign players; young players)

=== Squad changes ===
==== In ====
No.	Pos.	Nat.	Name	Age	Moving from		Type	Ends	Transfer fee	Date	Source
12	PG	(Italy) (Argentina)	Ariel Filloy	34	V.L. Pesaro	(Italy)	1 year	June 2022	Free	9 July 2021	
30	C	(United States)	Tyler Cain	33	V.L. Pesaro	(Italy)	1 year	June 2022	Free	11 July 2021	
3	PG	(United States)	Chris Wright	31	Afyon Belediye	(Turkey)	1 year	June 2022	Free	13 July 2021	
21	G/F	(Italy)	Joseph Mobio	23	APU Udine	(Italy)	1 year	June 2022	Free	14 July 2021	
18	C	(Italy)	Riccardo Cattapan	24	New Basket Brindisi	(Italy)	1 year	June 2022	Free	19 July 2019	
24	PF	(United States)	Mike Daum	25	Obradoiro	(Spain)	1 year	June 2022	Free	21 July 2019	
55	SG	(United States)	J.P. Macura	26	Afyon Belediye	(Turkey)	1 year	June 2022	Free	24 July 2021	
1	C	(Italy) (United States)	Chris Mortellaro	39	San Severo	(Italy)	1 year	June 2022	Undisclosed	29 September 2021	

1. In players: Players that signed after the beginning of the season

==== Out ====
No.	Pos.	Nat.	Name	Age	Moving to		Type	Transfer fee	Date	Source
7	SG	(Italy)	Lorenzo Ambrosin	23	Scafati Basket	(Italy)	End of contract	Free	1 July 2021	
9	PG	(Italy)	Lorenzo D'Ercole	32	Free agent		End of contract	Free	1 July 2021	
36	C	(Italy)	Alessandro Morgillo	21	Pallacanestro Biella	(Italy)	End of contract	Free	1 July 2021	
10	F	(Italy)	Fabi Augustin	29	Kleb Basket Ferrara	(Italy)	Exit option	Undisclosed	8 July 2021	
6	PF	(Italy)	Giulio Gazzotti	29	Basket Ravenna	(Italy)	Transfer	Undisclosed	6 August 2021	
21	G/F	(Italy)	Joseph Mobio	23	Scafati Basket	(Italy)	Transfer	Undisclosed	21 October 2021	

1. Out players: Players who left before the end of the season

==== Confirmed ====
No.	Pos.	Nat.	Name	Age	Moving from		Type	Ends	Transfer fee	Date	Source
8	PG	(Italy)	Riccardo Tavernelli	30	Latina Basket	(Italy)	2 + 1	June 2022	Free	19 June 2019	
14	PG	(Italy)	Bruno Mascolo	25	Aurora Basket Jesi	(Italy)	1 + 2 years	June 2022	Free	22 June 2019	
20	PF	(Italy)	Luca Severini	25	Universo Treviso Basket	(Italy)	1 + 2 years	June 2022	Free	20 January 2020	
22	SG	(United States)	Jamarr Sanders	32	Gaziantep Basketbol	(Turkey)	2 + 1 years	June 2022	Free	20 January 2020	
5	F/C	(United States)	Jalen Cannon	28	N.P.C. Rieti	(Italy)	1 + 1 years	June 2022	Free	4 July 2020	

==== Coach ====
Nat.	Name	Age.	Previous team		Type	Ends	Date	Source
(Italy)	Marco Ramondino	38	Junior Casale Monferrato	(Italy)	3 + 2 years	June 2023	23 October 2018	

=== On loan ===
Pos.	Nat.	Name	Age	Moving from		Moving to		Date	Contract	Ends
PF	(Italy)	Leonardo Okeke	18	College Borgomanero	(Italy)	Casale Monferrato	(Italy)	5 August 2021	5 years	June 2027

== Competitions ==
=== Supercup ===
==== Group stage ====
Pos	Team	Pld	W	L	PF	PA	PD	Qualification
1	Bertram Derthona Tortona	4	4	0	336	285	+51	Advance to Final Eight
2	Allianz Pallacanestro Trieste	4	2	2	326	345	−19	
3	Dolomiti Energia Trento	4	0	4	301	333	−32	

Source: LegaBasket Serie A
Rules for classification: All points scored in extra period(s) were not counted in the standings, nor for any tie-break situation.

==== Playoffs ====
18 September 2021 Quarterfinals	Virtus Segafredo Bologna	74–66	Bertram Derthona Tortona	Casalecchio di Reno, Bologna
21:00 (CEST)	Scoring by quarter: 16–14, 20–22, 18–10, 20–20
Discovery+, Eurosport, DMAX	Pts: Hervey 18; Rebs: Hervey 18; Asts: Pajola 4 PIR: Hervey 32	Boxscore	Pts: Daum 19; Rebs: Filloy 7 Asts: Wright 9 PIR: Filloy 17	Arena: Unipol Arena; Referees: Manuel Mazzoni, Alessandro Martolini, Christian Borgo

=== Serie A ===
Pos	Team	Pld	W	L	PF	PA	PD	Pts	Qualification
2	AX Armani Exchange Milano	30	24	6	2465	2155	+310	48	Qualification to Playoffs
3	Germani Basket Brescia	30	21	9	2524	2310	+214	42	Qualification to Playoffs
4	Bertram Derthona Basket	30	17	13	2418	2412	+6	34	Qualification to Playoffs
5	Umana Reyer Venezia	30	17	13	2331	2297	+34	34	Qualification to Playoffs
6	Banco di Sardegna Sassari	30	17	13	2541	2449	+92	34	Qualification to Playoffs

Source: LBA
