= 2021–22 LBA season =

LBA
- League: Lega Basket Serie A
- Season: 2021–22
- Dates: September 25, 2021 – June 2022
- Teams: 16
- TV partners: Discovery+, Eurosport, RaiSport

Regular season
- Season MVP: (Italy) Amedeo Della Valle
- Relegated: Fortitudo Bologna; Vanoli Cremona

LBA Finals
- Champions: AX Armani Exchange Milano (29th title)
- Runners-up: Virtus Segafredo Bologna
- Finals MVP: (Denmark) Shavon Shields

Statistical leaders
| Points | (United States) Marcus Keene | 18.7 |
| Rebounds | (United States) Tyrique Jones | 9.6 |
| Assists | (Italy) Andrea Cinciarini | 10.3 |

Lega Basket Serie A seasons
- ← 2020–21 2022–23 →

The 2021–22 LBA season is the 100th season of the Lega Basket Serie A (LBA), the men's top-tier professional basketball division of the Italian basketball league system.

== Teams ==
=== Promotion and relegation ===
Virtus Roma withdrew in the past season. Cantu ended on 15th place and therefore relegated to the Serie A2.

Napoli and Tortona were two best teams in Serie A2 and therefore promoted to Serie A.

=== Number of teams by region ===
| Number of teams | Region | Team(s) |
|---|---|---|
| 4 | Lombardy | AX Armani Exchange Milano; Germani Basket Brescia; Openjobmetis Varese; Vanoli Cremona |
| 3 | Emilia-Romagna | UNAHOTELS Reggio Emilia; Fortitudo Kigili Bologna; Virtus Segafredo Bologna |
| 2 | Veneto | NutriBullet Treviso; Umana Reyer Venezia |
| 1 | Apulia | Happy Casa Brindisi |
| 1 | Friuli-Venezia Giulia | Allianz Pallacanestro Trieste |
| 1 | Marche | Carpegna Prosciutto Basket Pesaro |
| 1 | Sardinia | Banco di Sardegna Sassari |
| 1 | Trentino-Alto Adige/Südtirol | Dolomiti Energia Trento |
| 1 | Campania | Gevi Napoli |
| 1 | Piedmont | Bertram Derthona Tortona |

=== Venues and locations ===
Location of teams in 2021–22 LBA season

| Team | Home city | Arena | Capacity | 2020–21 result |
|---|---|---|---|---|
| Allianz Pallacanestro Trieste | Trieste | Allianz Dome | 6,943 | 7th |
| AX Armani Exchange Milano | Milan | Mediolanum Forum | 12,700 | 2nd |
| Banco di Sardegna Sassari | Sassari | PalaSerradimigni | 5,000 | 5th |
| Bertram Derthona Basket Tortona | Tortona | PalaFerraris | 3,510 | promoted to LBA |
| Carpegna Prosciutto Basket Pesaro | Pesaro | Vitifrigo Arena | 10,323 | 13th |
| Dolomiti Energia Trento | Trento | BLM Group Arena | 4,360 | 8th |
| Fortitudo Kigili Bologna | Bologna | PalaDozza | 5,570 | 12th |
| Germani Brescia | Brescia | PalaLeonessa | 5,200 | 9th |
| GeVi Napoli Basket | Naples | PalaBarbuto | 5,500 | promoted to LBA |
| Happy Casa Brindisi | Brindisi | PalaPentassuglia | 3,534 | 3rd |
| NutriBullet Treviso Basket | Treviso | PalaVerde | 5,134 | 6th |
| Openjobmetis Varese | Varese | Enerxenia Arena | 5,100 | 14th |
| Umana Reyer Venezia | Venice | Palasport Taliercio | 3,506 | 4th |
| UNAHOTELS Reggio Emilia | Reggio Emilia | Unipol Arena | 8,400 | 11th |
| Vanoli Basket Cremona | Cremona | PalaRadi | 3,511 | 10th |
| Virtus Segafredo Bologna | Bologna | Segafredo Arena | 9,980 | 1st |

=== Managerial changes ===
| Team | Outgoing manager | Manner of departure | Date of vacancy | Position in table | Replaced by | Date of appointment |
|---|---|---|---|---|---|---|
| Germani Basket Brescia | (Italy) Maurizio Buscaglia | End of contract | 12 May 2021 | Pre-season | (Italy) Alessandro Magro | 18 May 2021 |
| Openjobmetis Varese | (Italy) Massimo Bulleri | Mutual consent | 19 May 2021 | Pre-season | (Italy) Adriano Vertemati | 15 June 2021 |
| Fortitudo Kigili Bologna | (Italy) Luca Dalmonte | Exit option | 20 May 2021 | Pre-season | (Croatia) Jasmin Repeša | 24 May 2021 |
| Carpegna Prosciutto Basket Pesaro | (Croatia) Jasmin Repeša | End of contract | 21 May 2021 | Pre-season | (Croatia) Aza Petrović | 16 July 2021 |
| Allianz Pallacanestro Trieste | (Italy) Eugenio Dalmasso | End of contract | 31 May 2021 | Pre-season | (Italy) Franco Ciani | 4 June 2021 |
| Banco di Sardegna Sassari | (Italy) Gianmarco Pozzecco | Mutual consent | 31 May 2021 | Pre-season | (Italy) Demis Cavina | 2 July 2021 |
| Virtus Segafredo Bologna | (Serbia) Aleksandar Đorđević | End of contract | 15 June 2021 | Pre-season | (Italy) Sergio Scariolo | 18 June 2021 |
| Fortitudo Kigili Bologna | (Croatia) Jasmin Repeša | Resigned | 26 September 2021 | 9th | (Italy) Antimo Martino | 28 September 2021 |
| Carpegna Prosciutto Basket Pesaro | (Croatia) Aza Petrović | Resigned | 19 October 2021 | 16th | (Italy) Luca Banchi | 16 July 2021 |
| Banco di Sardegna Sassari | (Italy) Demis Cavina | Sacked | 16 November 2021 | 12th | (Italy) Piero Bucchi | 16 July 2021 |

=== Referees ===
A total of 38 FIP officials set to work on the 2020–21 season in Lega Basket Serie A:

- Beniamino Manuel Attard (Siracusa)
- Lorenzo Baldini (Florence)
- Mark Bartoli (Trieste)
- Roberto Begnis (Cremona)
- Gabriele Bettini (Bologna)
- Andrea Bongiorni (Pisa)
- Matteo Boninsegna (Milan)
- Denny Borgioni (Rome)
- Christian Borgo (Vicenza)
- Federico Brindisi (Turin)
- Gianluca Capotorto (Rome)
- Marco Catani^{E} (Pescara)
- Guido Federico Di Francesco (Teramo)
- Giacomo Dori (Venice)
- Massimiliano Filippini (Bologna)
- Martino Galasso (Siena)
- Guido Giovannetti (Terni)
- Edoardo Gonella^{E} (Genoa)
- Valerio Grigioni (Rome)
- Saverio Lanzarini (Bologna)
- Carmelo Lo Guzzo (Pisa)
- Alessandro Martolini (Rome)
- Silvia Marziali^{E} (Rome)
- Manuel Mazzoni (Grosseto)
- Alessandro Nicolini (Palermo)
- Sergio Noce (Latina)
- Fabrizio Paglialunga (Taranto)
- Carmelo Paternicò (Enna)
- Giulio Pepponi (Perugia)
- Alessandro Perciavalle (Turin)
- Marco Pierantozzi (Ascoli Piceno)
- Denis Quarta (Turin)
- Michele Rossi (Arezzo)
- Tolga Ozge Sahin (Messina)
- Andrea Valzani (Milan)
- Alessandro Vicino (Bologna)
- Marco Vita (Ancona)

Notes
^E Newly promoted to the Serie A

== Regular season ==
In the regular season, teams play against each other home-and-away in a round-robin format. The matchdays are from September 25, 2021, to May 8, 2022.

=== League table ===
| Pos | Team | Pld | W | L | PF | PA | PD | Pts | Qualification |
|---|---|---|---|---|---|---|---|---|---|
| 1 | Virtus Segafredo Bologna | 30 | 26 | 4 | 2666 | 2364 | +302 | 52 | Qualification to Playoffs |
| 2 | AX Armani Exchange Milano | 30 | 24 | 6 | 2465 | 2155 | +310 | 48 | Qualification to Playoffs |
| 3 | Germani Basket Brescia | 30 | 21 | 9 | 2524 | 2310 | +214 | 42 | Qualification to Playoffs |
| 4 | Bertram Derthona Basket | 30 | 17 | 13 | 2418 | 2412 | +6 | 34 | Qualification to Playoffs |
| 5 | Umana Reyer Venezia | 30 | 17 | 13 | 2331 | 2297 | +34 | 34 | Qualification to Playoffs |
| 6 | Banco di Sardegna Sassari | 30 | 17 | 13 | 2541 | 2449 | +92 | 34 | Qualification to Playoffs |
| 7 | UNAHOTELS Reggio Emilia | 30 | 15 | 15 | 2409 | 2401 | +8 | 30 | Qualification to Playoffs |
| 8 | Carpegna Prosciutto Pesaro | 30 | 14 | 16 | 2408 | 2518 | −110 | 28 | Qualification to Playoffs |
| 9 | Allianz Pallacanestro Trieste | 30 | 14 | 16 | 2390 | 2464 | −74 | 28 | |
| 10 | NutriBullet Treviso | 30 | 12 | 18 | 2366 | 2509 | −143 | 24 | |
| 11 | Happy Casa Brindisi | 30 | 12 | 18 | 2440 | 2499 | −59 | 24 | |
| 12 | Openjobmetis Varese | 30 | 12 | 18 | 2470 | 2655 | −185 | 24 | |
| 13 | Dolomiti Energia Trento | 30 | 11 | 19 | 2345 | 2447 | −102 | 22 | |
| 14 | GeVi Napoli | 30 | 11 | 19 | 2393 | 2455 | −62 | 22 | |
| 15 | Fortitudo Kigili Bologna | 30 | 9 | 21 | 2429 | 2511 | −82 | 18 | Relegation to Serie A2 |
| 16 | Vanoli Cremona | 30 | 8 | 22 | 2386 | 2535 | −149 | 16 | Relegation to Serie A2 |

Source: LBA

== Playoffs ==
The LBA playoffs quarterfinals and semifinals are best of five formats, while the finals series are best of seven format. The playoffs started in May 2022 and finished in June 2022.

Quarterfinals
Virtus Segafredo Bologna | 82 | 70 | 75
Carpegna Prosciutto Pesaro | 76 | 51 | 55
Bertram Derthona Basket | 66 | 70 | 73 | 72
Umana Reyer Venezia | 77 | 58 | 63 | 60
AX Armani Exchange Milano | 91 | 91 | 89
UNAHOTELS Reggio Emilia | 82 | 65 | 59
Germani Basket Brescia | 104 | 85 | 68 | 95
Banco di Sardegna Sassari | 97 | 91 | 98 | 98

Semifinals
Virtus Segafredo Bologna | 77 | 91 | 77
Bertram Derthona Basket | 73 | 70 | 69
AX Armani Exchange Milano | 88 | 91 | 87
Banco di Sardegna Sassari | 71 | 82 | 69

Finals
Virtus Segafredo Bologna | 62 | 75 | 82 | 62 | 84 | 64
AX Armani Exchange Milano | 66 | 68 | 94 | 77 | 78 | 81

== Awards ==
=== Season MVP ===
- (Italy) Amedeo Della Valle – Brescia

=== Best Defender ===
- (United States) Kyle Hines – A|X Armani Exchange Milan

=== Best Player Under 22 ===
- (Italy) Matteo Spagnolo – Vanoli Cremona

=== Best Sixth Man ===
- (Italy) Marco Belinelli – Virtus Bologna

=== Finals MVP ===
- (Denmark) Shavon Shields – A|X Armani Exchange Milan

=== Rookie of the Year ===
- (Canada) (Greece) Naz Mitrou-Long – Brescia

All-Italian League Team
| Pos. | Player | Team | Ref. |
| PG | (Italy) Andrea Cinciarini | Reggio Emilia | |
| SG | (Italy) Amedeo Della Valle | Brescia | |
| SF | (United States) Kyle Weems | Virtus Bologna | |
| PF | (Italy) Nicolò Melli | Olimpia Milano | |
| C | (United States) Tyrique Jones | Pesaro | |

== Serie A clubs in European competitions ==
| | Competition | Team | Progress | Result | Total W–L |
| Euroleague; Basketball | | | | | |
| Euroleague; Basketball | EuroLeague | AX Armani Exchange Milano | Playoffs | vs (Turkey) Anadolu Efes (1–3) | 20–12 |
| Euroleague; Basketball | EuroLeague | AX Armani Exchange Milano | Regular season | 3rd of 18 teams (19–9) | 20–12 |
| Euroleague; Basketball | EuroCup | Virtus Segafredo Bologna | Final | vs (Turkey) Bursaspor (W) | 15–7 |
| Euroleague; Basketball | EuroCup | Virtus Segafredo Bologna | Semifinal | vs (Spain) Valencia (W) | 15–7 |
| Euroleague; Basketball | EuroCup | Virtus Segafredo Bologna | Quarter-finals | vs (Germany) Ratiopharm Ulm (W) | 15–7 |
| Euroleague; Basketball | EuroCup | Virtus Segafredo Bologna | Round 16 | vs (Lithuania) Lietkabelis (W) | 15–7 |
| Euroleague; Basketball | EuroCup | Virtus Segafredo Bologna | Regular season | 4th of 10 teams (11–7) | 15–7 |
| Euroleague; Basketball | EuroCup | Umana Reyer Venezia | Round of 16 | vs (France) Levallois (L) | 9–10 |
| Euroleague; Basketball | EuroCup | Umana Reyer Venezia | Regular season | 6th of 10 teams (9–9) | 9–10 |
| Euroleague; Basketball | EuroCup | Dolomiti Energia Trentino | Regular season | 9th of 10 teams (1–15) | 1–15 |
| FIBA | | | | | |
| FIBA | Champions; League | NutriBullet Treviso | Top 16 | 4nd of 4 teams (0–6) | 7–8 |
| FIBA | Champions; League | NutriBullet Treviso | Play-ins | vs (Greece) Lavrio Megabolt (2–0) | 7–8 |
| FIBA | Champions; League | NutriBullet Treviso | Regular season | 2nd of 4 teams (4–2) | 7–8 |
| FIBA | Champions; League | NutriBullet Treviso | Qualification final | vs (Belarus) Tsmoki-Minsk (W) | 7–8 |
| FIBA | Champions; League | NutriBullet Treviso | Qualification semifinal | vs (Denmark) Bakken Bears (W) | 7–8 |
| FIBA | Champions; League | NutriBullet Treviso | Qualification quarterfinal | vs (United Kingdom) London Lions (W) | 7–8 |
| FIBA | Champions; League | Banco di Sardegna Sassari | Regular season | 4th of 4 teams (1–5) | 1–5 |
| FIBA | Champions; League | Happy Casa Brindisi | Regular season | 4th of 4 teams (1–5) | 1–5 |
| FIBA | Europe Cup | UNAHOTELS Reggio Emilia | Final | vs (Turkey) Bahçeşehir Koleji (143–162) | 12–6 |
| FIBA | Europe Cup | UNAHOTELS Reggio Emilia | Semifinal | vs (Denmark) Bakken Bears (164–146) | 12–6 |
| FIBA | Europe Cup | UNAHOTELS Reggio Emilia | Quarter-finals | vs (Poland) Legia Warsaw (151–143) | 12–6 |
| FIBA | Europe Cup | UNAHOTELS Reggio Emilia | Second round | 1st of 4 teams (5–1) | 12–6 |
| FIBA | Europe Cup | UNAHOTELS Reggio Emilia | Regular season | 2nd of 4 teams (4–2) | 12–6 |

== See also ==
- 2021 Italian Basketball Supercup
