= 2021–22 Aquila Basket Trento season =

Italian basketball season

Aquila Basket Trento
2020–21 season
- Owner: Aquila Basket Trento 2013 S.R.L.
- President: Luigi Longhi
- Head coach: Emanuele Molin
- Arena: PalaTrento
- LBA: Regular season
- EuroCup Basketball: Regular season
- Supercup: Group stage (3rd of 3)

The 2020–21 season is Aquila Basket Trento's 27th in existence and the club's 9th consecutive season in the top tier Italian basketball.

== Players ==
=== Current roster ===
Dolomiti Energia Trento roster
Players
Coaches

Pos.	No.	Nat.	Name	Ht.	Wt.	Age
SG	0	(United States)	Johnson, Dominique	1.93 m (6 ft 4 in)	88 kg (194 lb)	39 – 9 June 1987
SG	1	(United States)	Bradford, Desonta	1.93 m (6 ft 4 in)	86 kg (190 lb)	30 – 12 April 1996
F/C	3	(United States)	Williams, Johnathan	2.06 m (6 ft 9 in)	103 kg (227 lb)	31 – 22 May 1995
SF	5	(United States)	Reynolds, Cameron	2.01 m (6 ft 7 in)	102 kg (225 lb)	31 – 7 February 1995
G/F	8	(Italy)	Conti, Luca	1.96 m (6 ft 5 in)	84 kg (185 lb)	25 – 20 December 2000
PG	10	(Argentina)	Forray, Andrés Pablo (C)	1.87 m (6 ft 2 in)	85 kg (187 lb)	40 – 20 March 1986
SG	12	(Italy)	Flaccadori, Diego	1.95 m (6 ft 5 in)	80 kg (176 lb)	30 – 5 April 1996
F/C	14	(Italy)	Mezzanotte, Andrea	2.08 m (6 ft 10 in)	89 kg (196 lb)	28 – 8 April 1998
C	23	(Italy)	Ladurner, Maximilian	2.07 m (6 ft 9 in)	95 kg (209 lb)	24 – 6 December 2001
SF	24	(United States)	Caroline, Jordan	2.01 m (6 ft 7 in)	107 kg (236 lb)	30 – 15 January 1996

Head coach

- (Italy) Emanuele Molin

Assistant coach(es)

- (Italy) Davide Dusmet
- (Italy) Fabio Bongi

Legend

- (C) Team captain
- Injured

- Roster
Updated: 12 March 2022

Note: Flags indicate national team eligibility at FIBA-sanctioned events. Players may hold other non-FIBA nationalities not displayed.

=== Depth chart ===
Pos.	Starting 5	Bench
C	Johnathan Williams	Maximilian Ladurner
PF	Jordan Caroline	Andrea Mezzanotte
SF	Cameron Reynolds	Luca Conti
SG	Diego Flaccadori	Dominique Johnson
PG	Andrés Pablo Forray	Desonta Bradford

(colours: Italian or homegrown players; foreign players; young players)

=== Squad changes ===
==== In ====
No.	Pos.	Nat.	Name	Age	Moving from		Type	Ends	Transfer fee	Date	Source
24	SF	(United States)	Jordan Caroline	25	Kaohsiung Jeoutai Technology	(Taiwan)	1 year	June 2022	Free	30 June 2021	
5	SF	(United States)	Cameron Reynolds	26	Houston Rockets	(United States)	1 year	June 2022	Free	3 July 2021	
12	SG	(Italy)	Diego Flaccadori	25	Bayern Munich	(Germany)	Loan contract	June 2022	Undisclosed	20 July 2021	
1	SG	(United States)	Desonta Bradford	25	Phoenix Brussels	(Belgium)	1 year	June 2022	Undisclosed	28 July 2021	
13	SG	(United States)	Wesley Saunders	28	Fortitudo Bologna	(Italy)	1 year	June 2022	Undisclosed	13 August 2021	
3	F/C	(United States)	Johnathan Williams	26	Niners Chemnitz	(Germany)	1 year	June 2022	Free	21 August 2021	
0	SG	(United States)	Dominique Johnson	34	Fuerza Regia	(Italy)	4 months	June 2022	Free	22 February 2022	

1. In players: Players that signed after the beginning of the season

==== Out ====
No.	Pos.	Nat.	Name	Age	Moving to		Type	Transfer fee	Date	Source
9	SF	(Puerto Rico)	Gary Browne	28	Atléticos de San Germán	(Puerto Rico)	End of contract	Free	16 May 2021	
25	C	(Italy)	Luca Lechthaler	35	Retired		End of contract	Free	26 June 2021	
1	SF	(United States)	Kelvin Martin	31	Heidelberg	(Germany)	End of contract	Free	1 July 2021	
11	SG	(United States)	Victor Sanders	26	Reyer Venezia	(Italy)	End of contract	Free	1 July 2021	
20	SG	(United States)	Jeremy Morgan	26	Telekom Baskets Bonn	(Germany)	End of contract	Free	1 July 2021	
22	C	(United States)	JaCorey Williams	27	JL Bourg	(France)	End of contract	Free	1 July 2021	
32	F	(United States)	Luke Maye	24	Bàsquet Manresa	(Spain)	End of contract	Free	1 July 2021	
7	PF	(Italy)	Davide Pascolo	30	Assigeco Piacenza	(Italy)	Loan contract	Undisclosed	29 September 2021	
13	F	(United States)	Wesley Saunders	28	Free agent		Mutual Agreement	Free	11 March 2022	

1. Out players: Players who left before the end of the season

==== Confirmed ====
No.	Pos.	Nat.	Name	Age	Moving from		Type	Ends	Transfer fee	Date	Source
10	PG	(Argentina) (Italy)	Andrés Pablo Forray	35	Fulgor Libertas Forlì	(Italy)	9 + 3 year	June 2023	Free	22 February 2011	
14	F/C	(Italy)	Andrea Mezzanotte	23	Blu Basket Treviglio	(Italy)	3 + 3 year	June 2022	Free	23 July 2018	
8	SF	(Italy)	Luca Conti	20	Poderosa Montegranaro	(Italy)	1 year	June 2021	Free	6 July 2020	

==== Coach ====
Nat.	Name	Age.	Previous team		Type	Ends	Start Date	Source
(Italy)	Emanuele Molin	61	Aquila Basket Trento (assistant)	(Italy)	1 + 4 years	June 2025	31 January 2021	

=== On loan ===
Pos.	Nat.	Name	Age	Moving to		Date	Contract	Ends
PF	(Italy)	Davide Pascolo	30	Assigeco Piacenza	(Italy)	8 July 2021	2 + 3 year	June 2023

== Competitions ==
=== Supercup ===
Pos	Team	Pld	W	L	PF	PA	PD	Qualification
1	Bertram Derthona Tortona	4	4	0	336	285	+51	Advance to Final Eight
2	Allianz Pallacanestro Trieste	4	2	2	326	345	−19	
3	Dolomiti Energia Trento	4	0	4	301	333	−32	

Source: LegaBasket Serie A
Rules for classification: All points scored in extra period(s) were not counted in the standings, nor for any tie-break situation.
