= 2021–22 Pallacanestro Varese season =

Italian basketball season

Pallacanestro Varese
2021–22 season
- Owner: Varese nel cuore s.c. a r.l.
- President: Marco Vittorelli
- Head coach: Adriano Vertemati
- Arena: Palasport Lino Oldrini
- LBA: Regular season
- Supercup: Group stage (3rd of 3)

The 2020–21 season is Pallacanestro Varese's 77th in existence and the club's 13th consecutive season in the top tier Italian basketball.

== Kit ==
Supplier: Macron / Sponsor: Openjobmetis

== Players ==
=== Current roster ===
Openjobmetis Varese roster
Players
Coaches

Pos.	No.	Nat.	Name	Ht.		Age
G	7	(United States)	Beane, Anthony	1.88 m (6 ft 2 in)	87 kg (192 lb)	32 – 6 May 1994
G	8	(Italy)	Woldetensae, Tomas	1.96 m (6 ft 5 in)	89 kg (196 lb)	28 – 30 April 1998
PF	9	(Lithuania)	Sorokas, Paulius	2.00 m (6 ft 7 in)	90 kg (198 lb)	34 – 25 August 1992
PG	10	(Italy)	De Nicolao, Giovanni	1.91 m (6 ft 3 in)	79 kg (174 lb)	30 – 10 June 1996
F	11	(Estonia)	Vene, Siim-Sander	2.03 m (6 ft 8 in)	97 kg (214 lb)	35 – 12 November 1990
G/F	12	(Puerto Rico)	Reyes, Justin	1.93 m (6 ft 4 in)	93 kg (205 lb)	31 – 16 March 1995
PG	13	(Italy)	Librizzi, Matteo	1.80 m (5 ft 11 in)	70 kg (154 lb)	24 – 6 April 2002
PF	18	(Italy)	Virginio, Nicolò	2.05 m (6 ft 9 in)		23 – 18 March 2003
F	21	(Italy)	Ferrero, Giancarlo (C)	1.98 m (6 ft 6 in)	97 kg (214 lb)	38 – 29 August 1988
C	30	(Italy)	Caruso, Guglielmo	2.08 m (6 ft 10 in)	90 kg (198 lb)	27 – 3 July 1999
PG	45	(United States)	Keene, Marcus	1.75 m (5 ft 9 in)	80 kg (176 lb)	31 – 6 May 1995

Head coach

- (Italy) Alberto Seravalli

Assistant coach(es)

- (Italy) Vincenzo Cavazzana

Legend

- (C) Team captain
- Injured

- Roster
Updated: April 14, 2022

Note: Flags indicate national team eligibility at FIBA-sanctioned events. Players may hold other non-FIBA nationalities not displayed.

=== Depth chart ===
Pos.	Starting 5	Bench 1	Bench 2
C	Guglielmo Caruso
PF	Paulius Sorokas	Giancarlo Ferrero	Nicolò Virginio
SF	Siim-Sander Vene
SG	Tomas Woldetensae	Anthony Beane	Matteo Librizzi
PG	Marcus Keene	Trey Kell	Giovanni De Nicolao

(colours: Italian or homegrown players; foreign players; young players)

=== Squad changes ===
==== In ====
No.	Pos.	Nat.	Name	Age	Moving from		Type	Ends	Transfer fee	Date	Source
5	SF	(Italy)	Alessandro Gentile	28	Estudiantes	(Spain)	1 year	June 2022	Free	25 June 2021	
30	C	(Italy)	Guglielmo Caruso	22	Santa Clara Broncos	(United States)	2+1 years	June 2023 + 2024	Free	10 July 2021	
3	PG	(United States)	Trey Kell	25	Stal Ostrów Wielkopolski	(Poland)	1 year	June 2022	Free	14 July 2021	
11	SG	(United States)	Elijah Wilson	26	Dąbrowa Górnicza	(Poland)	1 year	June 2022	Free	19 July 2021	
9	PF	(Lithuania)	Paulius Sorokas	28	Chieti	(Italy)	1 year	June 2022	Free	21 July 2021	
6	PG	(Italy)	Andrea Amato	27	APU Udine	(Italy)	3 months	December 2021	Free	24 September 2021	
45	PG	(United States)	Marcus Keene	26	Cedevita Olimpija	(Slovenia)	1 year	June 2022	Free	16 November 2021	
11	F	(Estonia)	Siim-Sander Vene	31	Limoges CSP	(France)	6 months	June 2022	Free	4 January 2022	
12	G/F	(Puerto Rico)	Justin Reyes	26	Capitanes de la Ciudad de México	(Mexico)	6 months	June 2022	Free	17 January 2022	
8	G	(Italy)	Tomas Woldetensae	23	Chieti Basket 1974	(Italy)	6 months	June 2022	Free	11 February 2022	

1. In players: Players who signed after the beginning of the season

==== Out ====
No.	Pos.	Nat.	Name	Age	Moving to		Type	Transfer fee	Date	Source
10	PG	(Italy)	Michele Ruzzier	23	Virtus Bologna	(Italy)	Exit option	€15,000	30 June 2021	
3	C	(United States)	Anthony Morse	27	Pallacanestro Piacentina	(Italy)	End of contract	Free	1 July 2021	
4	F/C	(Argentina)	Luis Scola	41	Retired		End of contract	Free	1 July 2021	
23	SG	(United States)	Toney Douglas	35	Iraklis	(Greece)	End of contract	Free	1 July 2021	
12	G/F	(Latvia)	Artūrs Strautiņš	22	Reggio Emilia	(Italy)	Exit option	Undisclosed	4 July 2020	
19	SF	(Italy)	Niccolò De Vico	24	Basket Torino	(Italy)	Transfer	Undisclosed	20 July 2021	
11	SG	(United States)	Elijah Wilson	26	Start Lublin	(Poland)	Transfer	Undisclosed	24 November 2021	
6	PG	(Italy)	Andrea Amato	27	Pallacanestro Nardò	(Italy)	Mutual consent	Undisclosed	7 December 2021	
15	C	(United States)	John Egbunu	27	Hapoel Jerusalem	(Israel)	Mutual consent	Undisclosed	25 December 2021	
22	SF	(United States)	Jalen Jones	28	JL Bourg	(France)	Mutual consent	Undisclosed	4 January 2022	
5	SF	(Italy)	Alessandro Gentile	29	Free agent		Mutual consent	Free	27 January 2022	

1. Out players: Players who left before the end of the season

–

==== Confirmed ====
No.	Pos.	Nat.	Name	Age	Moving from		Type	Ends	Transfer fee	Date	Source
21	F	(Italy)	Giancarlo Ferrero	32	Pallacanestro Trapani	(Italy)	4 + 3 years	June 2022	Free	4 July 2015	
5	PG	(Italy)	Giovanni De Nicolao	25	Fortitudo Agrigento	(Italy)	2 years	June 2022	Free	12 June 2020	
22	SF	(United States)	Jalen Jones	28	Capital City Go-Go	(United States)	1 + 1 years	June 2021	Undisclosed	9 November 2020	
2	G	(United States)	Anthony Beane	26	Virtus Roma	(Italy)	2 years	June 2022	Free	14 December 2020	
15	C	(United States)	John Egbunu	26	Busan KT Sonicboom	(South Korea)	1 + 1 years	June 2022	Free	28 January 2021	

==== Coach ====
Nat.	Name	Age.	Previous team		Type	Ends	Date	Replaces		Date	Type
(Italy)	Alberto Seravalli	38	Pallacanestro Varese (assistant)	(Italy)	End of the season	June 2022	14 April 2022	(Netherlands)	Johan Roijakkers	14 April 2022	Sacked
(Netherlands)	Johan Roijakkers	41	Brose Bamberg	(Germany)	End of the season	June 2022	12 January 2022	(Italy)	Adriano Vertemati	11 January 2022	Mutual consent
(Italy)	Adriano Vertemati	40	Bayern Munich (assistant)	(Germany)	2 years	June 2023	15 June 2021	(Italy)	Massimo Bulleri	19 May 2021	Mutual consent

== Competitions ==
=== Supercup ===
Pos	Team	Pld	W	L	PF	PA	PD	Qualification
1	Banco di Sardegna Sassari	4	4	0	350	304	+46	Advance to Final Eight
2	Vanoli Cremona	4	1	3	319	337	−18	
3	Openjobmetis Varese	4	1	3	299	327	−28	

Source: LegaBasket Serie A
Rules for classification: All points scored in extra period(s) were not counted in the standings, nor for any tie-break situation.

=== Serie A ===
Pos	Team	Pld	W	L	PF	PA	PD	Pts
10	NutriBullet Treviso	30	12	18	2366	2509	−143	24
11	Happy Casa Brindisi	30	12	18	2440	2499	−59	24
12	Openjobmetis Varese	30	12	18	2470	2655	−185	24
13	Dolomiti Energia Trento	30	11	19	2345	2447	−102	22
14	GeVi Napoli	30	11	19	2393	2455	−62	22

Source: LBA
