= 2021–22 Brescia Leonessa season =

Italian basketball season

Basket Brescia Leonessa
2021–22 season
- Owner: Graziella Bragaglio; Matteo Bonetti
- President: Graziella Bragaglio
- Head coach: Alessandro Magro
- Arena: PalaLeonessa
- LBA: Regular season
- Supercup: Group stage (3rd of 3)

The 2021–22 season is Brescia Leonessa's 13th in existence and the club's 7th consecutive season in the top tier Italian basketball.

== Kit ==
Supplier: Errea / Sponsor: Germani

== Players ==
=== Current roster ===
Germani Basket Brescia roster
Players
Coaches

Pos.	No.	Nat.	Name	Ht.	Wt.	Age
PF	1	(United States)	Gabriel, Kenny	2.06 m (6 ft 9 in)	99 kg (218 lb)	37 – 3 July 1989
SG	2	(United States)	Moore, Lee	1.93 m (6 ft 4 in)	79 kg (174 lb)	31 – 9 August 1995
SG	3	(Canada)	Mitrou-Long, Naz	1.91 m (6 ft 3 in)	99 kg (218 lb)	33 – 3 August 1993
SG	7	(United States)	Petrucelli, John	1.93 m (6 ft 4 in)	82 kg (181 lb)	33 – 27 October 1992
SG	8	(Italy)	Della Valle, Amedeo	1.94 m (6 ft 4 in)	90 kg (198 lb)	33 – 11 April 1993
F	12	(Italy)	Eboua, Paul	2.03 m (6 ft 8 in)	97 kg (214 lb)	26 – 15 February 2000
SF	17	(Italy)	Parrillo, Salvatore	1.92 m (6 ft 4 in)	92 kg (203 lb)	33 – 1 December 1992
F/C	20	(United States)	Cobbins, Michael	2.03 m (6 ft 8 in)	104 kg (229 lb)	34 – 9 August 1992
F/C	21	(Italy)	Biatcha, Loan	2.02 m (6 ft 8 in)	90 kg (198 lb)	23 – 16 September 2003
F/C	23	(Italy)	Burns, Christian	2.03 m (6 ft 8 in)	110 kg (243 lb)	41 – 4 September 1985
PG	24	(Italy)	Laquintana, Tommaso	1.88 m (6 ft 2 in)	80 kg (176 lb)	31 – 7 July 1995
F	33	(Italy)	Rodella, Francesco	2.00 m (6 ft 7 in)	85 kg (187 lb)	23 – 28 July 2003
SF	34	(United States)	Moss, David (C)	1.96 m (6 ft 5 in)	100 kg (220 lb)	43 – 9 September 1983
F/C	00	(United States)	Brown, John	2.03 m (6 ft 8 in)	98 kg (216 lb)	34 – 28 January 1992

Head coach

- (Italy) Alessandro Magro

Assistant coach(es)

- (Italy) Emanuele Di Paolantonio
- (Italy) Matteo Cotelli

Legend

- (C) Team captain
- Injured

- Roster
Updated: April 11, 2022

Note: Flags indicate national team eligibility at FIBA-sanctioned events. Players may hold other non-FIBA nationalities not displayed.

=== Depth chart ===
Pos.	Starting 5	Bench 1	Bench 2
C	Michael Cobbins	John Brown	Christian Burns
PF	Kenny Gabriel	Paul Eboua	Loan Biatcha
SF	David Moss	Salvatore Parrillo	Francesco Rodella
SG	Amedeo Della Valle	John Petrucelli
PG	Naz Mitrou-Long	Lee Moore	Tommaso Laquintana

(colours: Italian or homegrown players; foreign players; young players)

=== Squad changes ===
==== In ====
No.	Pos.	Nat.	Name	Age	Moving from		Type	Ends	Transfer fee	Date	Source
23	F/C	(Italy) (United States)	Christian Burns	35	Napoli Basket	(Italy)	Return from loan	June 2022	Free	28 June 2021	
8	SG	(Italy)	Amedeo Della Valle	28	Budućnost	(Montenegro)	1 year	June 2022	Free	23 June 2021	
24	PG	(Italy)	Tommaso Laquintana	25	Pallacanestro Trieste	(Italy)	1 year	June 2022	Free	3 July 2021	
2	SG	(United States)	Lee Moore	25	MKS Dąbrowa Górnicza	(Poland)	1 year	June 2022	Free	6 July 2021	
7	SG	(United States)	John Petrucelli	28	Ratiopharm Ulm	(Germany)	1 year	June 2022	Free	16 July 2021	
1	PF	(United States)	Kenny Gabriel	32	Mornar Bar	(Montenegro)	1 year	June 2022	Free	23 July 2021	
20	C	(United States)	Michael Cobbins	28	Maccabi Haifa	(Israel)	1 year	June 2022	Free	26 July 2021	
3	G	(Canada) (Greece)	Naz Mitrou-Long	27	Fort Wayne Mad Ants	(United States)	1 year	June 2022	Free	26 July 2021	
12	F	(Cameroon) (Italy)	Paul Eboua	21	V.L. Pesaro	(Italy)	1 year	June 2022	Free	23 August 2021	
	PF	(United States)	John Brown	30	BC UNICS	(Russia)	2 months	June 2022	Free	11 April 2022	

==== Out ====
No.	Pos.	Nat.	Name	Age	Moving to		Type	Transfer fee	Date	Source
19	PF	(Portugal) (United States)	Jeremiah Wilson	33	N.P.C. Rieti	(Italy)	Mutual consent	Free	16 May 2021	
41	PF	(Italy)	Brian Sacchetti	35	Scaligera Basket Verona	(Italy)	Mutual consent	Free	16 May 2021	
11	PG	(Canada)	Kenny Chery	29	Avtodor Saratov	(Russia)	End of contract	Free	1 July 2021	
21	F/C	(United States)	Darral Willis	25	Free agent	(Russia)	End of contract	Free	1 July 2021	
24	SG	(United States)	Tyler Kalinoski	28	Breogán	(Spain)	End of contract	Free	1 July 2021	
12	SG	(Italy)	Giordano Bortolani	20	Universo Treviso Basket	(Italy)	Mutual consent	Undisclosed	8 July 2020	
22	SF	(United States)	Drew Crawford	30	BC Andorra	(Andorra)	Transfer	Undisclosed	19 July 2020	
7	PG	(Italy)	Luca Vitali	35	Napoli Basket	(Italy)	Sacked	Undisclosed	Summer 2021	

==== Confirmed ====
No.	Pos.	Nat.	Name	Age	Moving from		Type	Ends	Transfer fee	Date	Source
34	SF	(United States)	David Moss	36	Olimpia Milano	(Italy)	5 + 1 years	June 2022	Free	21 March 2016	
23	F/C	(Italy) (United States)	Christian Burns	34	Olimpia Milano	(Italy)	2 years	June 2022	Free	4 July 2020	
17	SF	(Italy)	Salvatore Parrillo	28	Pallacenestro Orzinuovi	(Italy)	1 + 1 years	June 2022	Free	13 July 2020	

1. In players: Burns at played on loan for Napoli Basket at the end of the 2020–21 season

==== Coach ====
Nat.	Name	Age.	Previous team		Type	Ends	Date	Replaces	Date	Type
(Italy)	Alessandro Magro	38	Dąbrowa Górnicza	(Poland)	1 year	June 2022	18 May 2021	Maurizio Buscaglia	12 May 2021	End of contract

== Competitions ==
=== Supercup ===
Pos	Team	Pld	W	L	PF	PA	PD	Qualification
1	NutriBullet Treviso Basket	4	4	0	323	296	+27	Advance to Final Eight
2	Gevi Napoli	4	1	3	293	307	−14	
3	Germani Brescia	4	1	3	322	335	−13	

Source: LegaBasket Serie A
Rules for classification: All points scored in extra period(s) were not counted in the standings, nor for any tie-break situation.

=== Serie A ===
Pos	Team	Pld	W	L	PF	PA	PD	Pts	Qualification
1	Virtus Segafredo Bologna	30	26	4	2666	2364	+302	52	Qualification to Playoffs
2	AX Armani Exchange Milano	30	24	6	2465	2155	+310	48	Qualification to Playoffs
3	Germani Basket Brescia	30	21	9	2524	2310	+214	42	Qualification to Playoffs
4	Bertram Derthona Basket	30	17	13	2418	2412	+6	34	Qualification to Playoffs
5	Umana Reyer Venezia	30	17	13	2331	2297	+34	34	Qualification to Playoffs

Source: LBA
