= 2021–22 Napoli Basket season =

Italian basketball season

Napoli Basket
2021–22 season
- Owner: Napoli Basket S.S.D.
- President: Federico Grassi
- Head coach: Stefano Sacripanti
- Arena: PalaBarbuto
- LBA: Regular season
- Supercup: Group stage (2nd of 3)

The 2021–22 season is Napoli Basket's 5th in existence and the club's 1st season in the top tier Italian basketball.

== Kit ==
Supplier: EYE Sport Wear / Sponsor: GeVi

== Players ==
=== Current roster ===
GeVi Napoli Basket roster
Players
Coaches

Pos.	No.	Nat.	Name	Ht.	Wt.	Age
C	0	(Italy)	Zerini, Andrea	2.05 m (6 ft 9 in)	112 kg (247 lb)	37 – 25 October 1988
PF	1	(United States)	McDuffie, Markis	2.03 m (6 ft 8 in)	95 kg (209 lb)	29 – 6 September 1997
SF	6	(Italy)	Grassi, Sergio	1.93 m (6 ft 4 in)	80 kg (176 lb)	22 – 25 June 2004
PG	7	(Italy)	Matera, Antonio	1.87 m (6 ft 2 in)	75 kg (165 lb)	22 – 24 February 2004
PG	8	(Lithuania)	Velička, Arnas	1.95 m (6 ft 5 in)	90 kg (198 lb)	26 – 10 December 1999
PF	11	(United States)	Parks, Jordan	2.01 m (6 ft 7 in)	91 kg (201 lb)	32 – 6 April 1994
G/F	13	(Italy)	Marini, Pierpaolo	1.93 m (6 ft 4 in)	87 kg (192 lb)	32 – 8 October 1993
C	15	(United States Virgin Islands)	Elegar, Frank (injured)	2.08 m (6 ft 10 in)	109 kg (240 lb)	39 – 3 December 1986
G/F	16	(Italy)	Uglietti, Lorenzo (C)	1.92 m (6 ft 4 in)	84 kg (185 lb)	32 – 27 June 1994
SG	25	(United States)	Rich, Jason	1.91 m (6 ft 3 in)	94 kg (207 lb)	40 – 5 May 1986
C	77	(Lithuania)	Gudaitis, Artūras	2.08 m (6 ft 10 in)	115 kg (254 lb)	33 – 19 June 1993

Head coach

- (Italy) Maurizio Buscaglia

Assistant coach(es)

- (Italy) Francesco Cavaliere
- (Italy) Armando Trojano
- (Italy) Davide Gabriele

Legend

- (C) Team captain
- Injured

- Roster
Updated: May 5, 2022

=== Depth chart ===
Pos.	Starting 5	Bench 1	Bench 2
C	Artūras Gudaitis	Andrea Zerini	Frank Elegar (injured)
PF	Jordan Parks	Markis McDuffie
SF	Lorenzo Uglietti	Sergio Grassi
SG	Jason Rich	Pierpaolo Marini
PG	Arnas Velička	Antonio Matera

(colours: Italian or homegrown players; foreign players; young players)

=== Squad changes ===
==== In ====
No.	Pos.	Nat.	Name	Age	Moving from		Type	Ends	Transfer fee	Date	Source
15	C	(United States Virgin Islands) (Guyana)	Frank Elegar	34	Reggio Emilia	(Italy)	1 year	June 2022	Free	21 July 2021	
25	SG	(United States)	Jason Rich	35	Free agent		1 year	June 2022	Free	2 August 2021	
1	PF	(United States)	Markis McDuffie	23	Casalpusterlengo	(Italy)	1 year	June 2022	Free	6 August 2021	
8	PG	(Lithuania)	Arnas Velička	21	Löwen Braunschweig	(Germany)	1 year	June 2022	Free	20 August 2021	
2	PG	(United States)	Jeremy Pargo	35	Maccabi Rishon LeZion	(Israel)	1 year	June 2022	Free	2 November 2021	
22	C	(United States)	Reggie Lynch	26	Iraklis Thessaloniki	(Greece)	1 year	June 2022	Free	22 November 2021	
7	PG	(Italy)	Luca Vitali	35	Pallacanestro Brescia	(Italy)	End of the season	June 2022	Free	28 January 2022	

1. In players: Players who signed after the beginning of the season

==== Out ====
No.	Pos.	Nat.	Name	Age	Moving to		Type	Transfer fee	Date	Source
23	C	(Italy) (United States)	Christian Burns	35	Brescia Leonessa	(Italy)	Return from loan	Free	27 June 2021	
7	C	(Italy)	Antonio Iannuzzi	30	Mantova	(Italy)	End of contract	Free	1 July 2021	
9	G/F	(Bosnia and Herzegovina)	Amar Klačar	21	Viola Reggio Calabria	(Italy)	End of contract	Free	1 July 2021	
12	G/F	(Italy)	Daniele Sandri	30	Orzinuovi	(Italy)	End of contract	Free	1 July 2021	
32	PG	(Italy)	Diego Monaldi	28	Scafati Basket	(Italy)	End of contract	Free	1 July 2021	
14	PG	(United States)	Josh Mayo	34	Free agent		Mutual agreement	Free	22 October 2021	
2	PG	(United States)	Jeremy Pargo	35	Windy City Bulls	(United States)	Mutual agreement	Free	25 January 2022	
21	SF	(Italy)	Eric Lombardi	29	Free agent		Mutual agreement	Free	5 May 2022	
7	PG	(Italy)	Luca Vitali	35	Pallacanestro Cantù	(Italy)	Transfer	Free	5 May 2022	

1. Out players: Players who left before the end of the season

==== Confirmed ====
No.	Pos.	Nat.	Name	Age	Moving from		Type	Ends	Transfer fee	Date	Source
13	G/F	(Italy)	Pierpaolo Marini	27	Pallacanestro Forlì	(Italy)	1 year	June 2021	Free	11 June 2020	
21	SF	(Italy)	Eric Lombardi	28	Pallacanestro Biella	(Italy)	1 year	June 2021	Free	12 June 2020	
14	G/F	(United States)	Josh Mayo	28	Pallacanestro Varese	(Italy)	1 year	June 2021	Free	21 June 2020	
11	PF	(United States)	Jordan Parks	27	Universo Treviso Basket	(Italy)	1 year	June 2021	Free	27 June 2020	
0	C	(Italy)	Andrea Zerini	32	Brescia Leonessa	(Italy)	1 year	June 2021	Free	28 July 2020	
16	SG	(Italy)	Lorenzo Uglietti	27	Universo Treviso Basket	(Italy)	1 year	June 2021	Free	9 September 2020	

==== Coach ====
Nat.	Name	Age.	Previous team		Type	Ends	Date	Source
(Italy)	Stefano Sacripanti	51	Virtus Bologna	(Italy)	1 + 2 years	June 2023	25 October 2019	

== Competitions ==
=== Supercup ===
Pos	Team	Pld	W	L	PF	PA	PD	Qualification
1	NutriBullet Treviso Basket	4	4	0	323	296	+27	Advance to Final Eight
2	Gevi Napoli	4	1	3	293	307	−14	
3	Germani Brescia	4	1	3	322	335	−13	

Source: LegaBasket Serie A
Rules for classification: All points scored in extra period(s) were not counted in the standings, nor for any tie-break situation.

=== Serie A ===
Pos	Team	Pld	W	L	PF	PA	PD	Pts	Qualification
12	Openjobmetis Varese	30	12	18	2470	2655	−185	24	
13	Dolomiti Energia Trento	30	11	19	2345	2447	−102	22	
14	GeVi Napoli	30	11	19	2393	2455	−62	22	
15	Fortitudo Kigili Bologna	30	9	21	2429	2511	−82	18	Relegation to Serie A2
16	Vanoli Cremona	30	8	22	2386	2535	−149	16	Relegation to Serie A2

Source: LBA
