= 2021–22 Pallacanestro Trieste season =

Italian basketball season

Pallacanestro Trieste
2021-22 season
- Owner: Stefano Landi (Landi Renzo); Bartoli family (Antichi Poderi di Canossa); Enrico San Pietro (ESP SRL); Andrea Baroni (End Holding); Graziano Sassi (GS Brands)
- President: Gianluca Mauro
- Head coach: Franco Ciani
- Arena: Allianz Dome
- LBA: Regular season
- Supercup: Group stage (2nd of 3)

The 2020–21 season is Pallacanestro Trieste's 47th in existence and the club's 4th consecutive season in the top tier Italian basketball.

== Kit ==
Supplier: Adidas / Sponsor: Allianz

== Players ==
=== Current roster ===
Allianz Pallacanestro Trieste roster
Players
Coaches

Pos.	No.	Nat.	Name	Ht.	Wt.	Age
SG	1	(Israel)	Banks, Adrian	1.91 m (6 ft 3 in)	88 kg (194 lb)	39 – 9 February 1986
PG	2	(United States)	Davis Jr., Corey	1.85 m (6 ft 1 in)	81 kg (179 lb)	28 – 4 June 1997
SG	3	(United States)	Alexander, Ty-Shon	1.91 m (6 ft 3 in)	88 kg (194 lb)	27 – 16 July 1998
PG	4	(Argentina)	Fernández, Juan	1.93 m (6 ft 4 in)	83 kg (183 lb)	35 – 22 July 1990
F/C	5	(Mali)	Konate, Sagaba	2.01 m (6 ft 7 in)	118 kg (260 lb)	28 – 19 March 1997
G	7	(Italy)	Longo, Stefano	1.92 m (6 ft 4 in)	79 kg (174 lb)	22 – 13 March 2003
SF	8	(Italy)	Deangeli, Lodovico	2.05 m (6 ft 9 in)	90 kg (198 lb)	25 – 19 May 2000
SG	9	(Italy)	Mian, Fabio	1.96 m (6 ft 5 in)	88 kg (194 lb)	33 – 7 February 1992
C	12	(Argentina)	Delía, Marcos	2.09 m (6 ft 10 in)	111 kg (245 lb)	33 – 8 April 1992
F/C	14	(Italy)	Campani, Luca	2.08 m (6 ft 10 in)	100 kg (220 lb)	35 – 18 February 1990
SF	15	(Italy)	Fantoma, Tommaso	1.93 m (6 ft 4 in)	85 kg (187 lb)	21 – 23 October 2003
G	18	(Italy)	Cavaliero, Daniele (C)	1.83 m (6 ft 0 in)	83 kg (183 lb)	41 – 10 January 1984
G	21	(Italy)	Campogrande, Luca	1.98 m (6 ft 6 in)	90 kg (198 lb)	29 – 30 April 1996
PF	24	(Latvia)	Gražulis, Andrejs	2.02 m (6 ft 8 in)	95 kg (209 lb)	32 – 21 July 1993
C	25	(Italy)	Lever, Alessandro	2.08 m (6 ft 10 in)	104 kg (229 lb)	26 – 4 December 1998

Head coach

- (Italy) Franco Ciani

Assistant coach(es)

- (Italy) Marco Legovich

Legend

- (C) Team captain
- Injured

- Roster
Updated: February 15, 2022

Note: Flags indicate national team eligibility at FIBA-sanctioned events. Players may hold other non-FIBA nationalities not displayed.

=== Depth chart ===
Pos.	Starting 5	Bench 1	Bench 2	Bench 3
C	Sagaba Konate	Marcos Delía
PF	Andrejs Gražulis	Alessandro Lever	Luca Campani
SF	Fabio Mian	Luca Campogrande	Lodovico Deangeli
SG	Adrian Banks	Ty-Shon Alexander	Daniele Cavaliero	Tommaso Fantoma
PG	Corey Davis Jr.	Juan Fernández	Stefano Longo

(colours: Italian or homegrown players; foreign players; young players)

=== Squad changes ===
==== In ====
No.	Pos.	Nat.	Name	Age	Moving from		Type	Ends	Transfer fee	Date	Source
5	F/C	(Mali)	Sagaba Konate	24	PAOK Thessaloniki	(Greece)	1 years	June 2022	Free	25 June 2021	
21	SG	(Italy)	Luca Campogrande	25	Reyer Venezia	(Italy)	1+1 years	June 2022 + 2023	Free	26 June 2021	
9	SG	(Italy)	Fabio Mian	29	APU Udine	(Italy)	2 years	June 2023	Free	30 June 2021	
25	C	(Italy)	Alessandro Lever	22	Grand Canyon Antelopes	(United States)	1 year	June 2022	Free	1 July 2021	
3	PG	(United States)	Corey Sanders	24	Astoria Bydgoszcz	(Poland)	1 year	June 2022	Free	12 July 2021	
1	SG	(Israel) (United States)	Adrian Banks	34	Fortitudo Bologna	(Italy)	1 years	June 2022	Free	14 June 2020	
8	SF	(Italy)	Lodovico Deangeli	21	APU Udine	(Italy)	Return from loan			15 July 2021	
2	PG	(Italy)	Corey Davis Jr.	24	KK Mornar Bar	(Montenegro)	1 year	June 2022	Undisclosed	15 July 2021	
14	F/C	(Italy)	Luca Campani	31	Basket Torino	(Italy)	End of the season	June 2022	Free	26 January 2022	

1. In players: Players who signed after the beginning of the season

==== Out ====
No.	Pos.	Nat.	Name	Age	Moving to		Type	Transfer fee	Date	Source
8	PG	(Italy)	Tommaso Laquintana	25	Brescia Leonessa	(Italy)	Mutual consent	Undisclosed	9 June 2021	
44	F	(Italy)	Davide Alviti	24	Olimpia Milano	(Italy)	Exit option	Undisclosed	19 June 2021	
20	PF	(Italy)	Matteo Da Ros	37	Pallacanestro Cantù	(Italy)	Exit option	Free	29 June 2021	
0	SF	(Italy)	Andrea Coronica	27	Retired		End of contract	Free	1 July 2021	
3	F/C	(United States)	DeVonte Upson	28	Denizli Basket	(Turkey)	Exit option	Undisclosed	1 July 2021	
15	SF	(United States)	Myke Henry	28	Champagne Châlons-Reims	(France)	End of contract	Free	1 July 2021	
35	SG	(United States)	Milton Doyle	27	Gaziantep Basketbol	(Turkey)	End of contract	Free	1 July 2021	
3	PG	(United States)	Corey Sanders	24	Lavrio	(Greece)	Mutual consent	Undisclosed	1 December 2021	

1. Out players: Players who left before the end of the season

==== Confirmed ====
No.	Pos.	Nat.	Name	Age	Moving from		Type	Ends	Transfer fee	Date	Source
18	PG	(Italy)	Daniele Cavaliero	36	Pallacanestro Varese	(Italy)	5 + 1 year	June 2022	Free	25 April 2017	
4	PG	(Argentina) (Italy)	Juan Fernández	30	Breogán	(Spain)	3 + 2 year	June 2022	Free	23 June 2017	
24	PF	(Latvia)	Andrejs Gražulis	27	Derthona Basket	(Italy)	1 + 1 years	June 2022	Free	19 June 2020	
12	C	(Argentina)	Marcos Delía	29	Virtus Bologna	(Italy)	1 + 1 years	June 2022	Free	12 October 2020	

==== Coach ====
Nat.	Name	Age.	Previous team		Type	Ends	Date	Replaces		Date	Type
(Italy)	Franco Ciani	60	Pallacanestro Trieste (assistant)	(Italy)	1+1	June 2022 + 2023	4 June 2021	(Italy)	Eugenio Dalmasson	31 May 2021	End of contract

=== On loan ===
Pos.	Nat.	Name	Age	Moving from	Moving to		Date	Loan period	Contract	Ends	Source
PG	(Italy)	Matteo Schina	20	Amici Pallacanestro Udine	Eurobasket Roma	(Italy)	18 November 2020	1 year	5 years	June 2025	

== Competitions ==
=== Supercup ===
Pos	Team	Pld	W	L	PF	PA	PD	Qualification
1	Bertram Derthona Tortona	4	4	0	336	285	+51	Advance to Final Eight
2	Allianz Pallacanestro Trieste	4	2	2	326	345	−19	
3	Dolomiti Energia Trento	4	0	4	301	333	−32	

Source: LegaBasket Serie A
Rules for classification: All points scored in extra period(s) were not counted in the standings, nor for any tie-break situation.

=== Serie A ===
Pos	Team	Pld	W	L	PF	PA	PD	Pts	Qualification
7	UNAHOTELS Reggio Emilia	30	15	15	2409	2401	+8	30	Qualification to Playoffs
8	Carpegna Prosciutto Pesaro	30	14	16	2408	2518	−110	28	Qualification to Playoffs
9	Allianz Pallacanestro Trieste	30	14	16	2390	2464	−74	28	
10	NutriBullet Treviso	30	12	18	2366	2509	−143	24	
11	Happy Casa Brindisi	30	12	18	2440	2499	−59	24	

Source: LBA
