= 2021–22 Fortitudo Bologna season =

Italian basketball season

Fortitudo Pallacanestro Bologna
2021-22 season
- Owner: Comitato per la Fondazione Fortitudo
- President: Christian Pavani
- Head coach: Antimo Martino
- Arena: PalaDozza
- LBA: Regular season
- Supercup: Group stage (3rd of 3)

The 2021–22 season is Fortitudo Bologna's 90th in existence and the club's 3rd consecutive season in the top tier Italian basketball.

== Kit ==
Supplier: Adidas / Sponsor: Kigili

== Players ==
=== Current roster ===
Fortitudo Kigili Bologna roster
Players
Coaches

Pos.	No.	Nat.	Name	Ht.	Wt.	Age
PG	00	(United States)	Frazier, Branden	1.91 m (6 ft 3 in)	77 kg (170 lb)	34 – 23 July 1992
G/F	4	(Italy)	Aradori, Pietro	1.96 m (6 ft 5 in)	100 kg (220 lb)	37 – 9 October 1988
PF	6	(Italy)	Mancinelli, Stefano (C)	2.03 m (6 ft 8 in)	102 kg (225 lb)	43 – 17 March 1983
PG	7	(United States)	Durham, Jabril	1.85 m (6 ft 1 in)	82 kg (181 lb)	32 – 13 April 1994
SF	9	(Italy)	Procida, Gabriele	2.01 m (6 ft 7 in)	88 kg (194 lb)	24 – 1 June 2002
F	12	(Germany)	Benzing, Robin	2.11 m (6 ft 11 in)	108 kg (238 lb)	37 – 1 May 1989
SG	14	(Dominican Republic)	Feldeine, James	1.93 m (6 ft 4 in)	91 kg (201 lb)	38 – 26 June 1988
PG	21	(Italy)	Fantinelli, Matteo	1.96 m (6 ft 5 in)	86 kg (190 lb)	32 – 24 November 1993
F	33	(Greece)	Charalampopoulos, Vassilis	2.04 m (6 ft 8 in)	109 kg (240 lb)	29 – 6 January 1997
F/C	35	(Italy)	Totè, Leonardo	2.11 m (6 ft 11 in)	110 kg (243 lb)	29 – 8 July 1997
C	99	(Italy)	Borra, Jacopo	2.15 m (7 ft 1 in)	115 kg (254 lb)	36 – 9 May 1990

Head coach

- (Italy) Luca Dalmonte

Assistant coach(es)

- (Italy) Stefano Rajola
- (Italy) Matteo Angori
- (Italy) Matteo Tasini

Legend

- (C) Team captain
- Injured

- Roster
Updated: February 13, 2022

Note: Flags indicate national team eligibility at FIBA-sanctioned events. Players may hold other non-FIBA nationalities not displayed.

=== Depth chart ===
Pos.	Starting 5	Bench 1	Bench 2
C	Leonardo Totè	Jacopo Borra
PF	Robin Benzing	V. Charalampopoulos	Brandon Ashley
SF	Pietro Aradori	Gabriele Procida	Stefano Mancinelli
SG	James Feldeine	Matteo Fantinelli
PG	Jabril Durham	Branden Frazier

(colours: Italian or homegrown players; foreign players; young players)

=== Squad changes ===
==== In ====
No.	Pos.	Nat.	Name	Age	Moving from		Type	Ends	Transfer fee	Date	Source
35	F/C	(Italy)	Leonardo Totè	23	Bilbao	(Spain)	Return from loan	June 2023	Free	21 May 2021	
41	C	(United States)	Geoffrey Groselle	28	Zielona Góra	(Poland)	1 year	June 2022	Free	21 July 2021	
9	SF	(Italy)	Gabriele Procida	19	Pallacanestro Cantù	(Italy)			Free	26 July 2021	
23	G/F	(United States)	Malachi Richardson	25	Cleveland Charge	(United States)	1 year	June 2022	Free	30 July 2021	
0	PF	(United States)	Brandon Ashley	27	NBA G League Ignite	(United States)	1 year	June 2022	Free	3 August 2021	
12	F	(Germany)	Robin Benzing	32	Basket Zaragoza	(Spain)	1 year	June 2022	Free	10 August 2021	
3	PG	(Iceland)	Jón Axel Guðmundsson	24	Skyliners Frankfurt	(Germany)	1 year	June 2022	Free	18 August 2021	
7	PG	(United States)	Jabril Durham	27	Hamburg Towers	(Germany)	1 year	June 2022	Free	12 October 2021	
14	SG	(Dominican Republic) (United States)	James Feldeine	33	Kuwait SC	(Kuwait)	1 year	June 2022	Undisclosed	29 November 2021	
33	SF	(Greece)	Vassilis Charalampopoulos	24	Reyer Venezia	(Italy)	1 year	June 2022	Undisclosed	1 December 2021	
99	C	(Italy)	Jacopo Borra	31	Dinamo Sassari	(Italy)	1 year	June 2022	Undisclosed	3 December 2021	
00	PG	(United States)	Branden Frazier	29	Zastal Zielona Góra	(Poland)	1 year	June 2022	Undisclosed	30 December 2021	

1. In players: Players that signed after the beginning of the season

==== Out ====
No.	Pos.	Nat.	Name	Age	Moving to		Type	Transfer fee	Date	Source
1	SG	(United States) (Israel)	Adrian Banks	35	Pallacanestro Trieste	(Italy)	Exit option	Undisclosed	14 June 2021	
10	SG	(United States)	Wesley Saunders	28	Aquila Trento	(Italy)	Exit option	Free	30 June 2021	
16	C	(United States)	Dario Hunt	32	Promitheas Patras	(Greece)	End of contract	Free	1 July 2021	
23	G/F	(Serbia)	Vojislav Stojanović	24	Stings Mantova	(Italy)	End of contract	Free	1 July 2021	
28	C	(Italy)	Marco Cusin	36	Pallacanestro Cantù	(Italy)	End of contract	Free	1 July 2021	
33	F	(United States)	Todd Withers	25	Adelaide 36ers	(Australia)	End of contract	Free	1 July 2021	
23	G/F	(United States)	Malachi Richardson	25	Wilki Morskie Szczecin	(Poland)	Sacked	Undisclosed	12 November 2021	
25	PG	(Italy)	Tommaso Baldasso	23	Olimpia Milano	(Italy)	Transfer	Undisclosed	22 November 2021	
0	PF	(United States)	Brandon Ashley	27	South East Melbourne Phoenix	(Australia)	Transfer	Undisclosed	10 January 2022	
3	PG	(Iceland)	Jón Axel Guðmundsson	25	Crailsheim Merlins	(Germany)	Transfer	Undisclosed	18 January 2022	
41	C	(United States)	Geoffrey Groselle	29	Brose Bamberg	(Germany)	Transfer	Undisclosed	12 February 2022	

1. Out players: Players who left before the end of the season

==== Confirmed ====
No.	Pos.	Nat.	Name	Age	Moving from		Type	Ends	Transfer fee	Date	Source
6	PF	(Italy)	Stefano Mancinelli	38	Auxilium Torino	(Italy)	5 years	June 2021	Free	6 July 2016	
21	PG	(Italy)	Matteo Fantinelli	27	Universo Treviso Basket	(Italy)	3 + 1	June 2022	Free	20 June 2018	
9	F	(Italy)	Nicolò Dellosto	21	Reggio Emilia	(Italy)	N/A	N/A	Youth system	6 August 2019	
4	G/F	(Italy)	Pietro Aradori	32	Virtus Bologna	(Italy)	4 years	June 2023	Free	12 August 2019	
35	F/C	(Italy)	Leonardo Totè	22	V.L. Pesaro	(Italy)	3 years	June 2023	Free	8 June 2020	
25	PG	(Italy)	Tommaso Baldasso	23	Virtus Roma	(Italy)	1 year	June 2021	Free	28 December 2020	

1. In players: Totè at played on loan for Bilbao Basket at the end of the 2020–21 season

==== Coach ====
Nat.	Name	Age.	Previous team		Type	Ends	Date	Replaces		Date	Type
(Italy)	Antimo Martino	43	Reggio Emilia	(Italy)	1 year	June 2022	28 September 2021	(Croatia)	Jasmin Repeša	28 September 2021	Resigned
(Croatia)	Jasmin Repeša	59	VL Pesaro	(Italy)			24 May 2021	(Italy)	Luca Dalmonte	20 May 2021	End of contract

=== On loan ===
Pos.	Nat.	Name	Age	Moving from		Moving to		Date	Contract	Ends
PG	(Italy)	Mattia Palumbo	20	Blu Basket Treviglio	(Italy)	Pallacanestro Forlì	(Italy)	10 July 2021	4 years	June 2024

== Competitions ==
=== Supercup ===
Pos	Team	Pld	W	L	PF	PA	PD	Qualification
1	Umana Reyer Venezia	4	4	0	329	281	+48	Advance to Final Eight
2	UnaHotels Reggio Emilia	4	2	2	302	284	+18	
3	Fortitudo Bologna	4	0	4	270	336	−66	

Source: LegaBasket Serie A
Rules for classification: All points scored in extra period(s) were not counted in the standings, nor for any tie-break situation.

=== Serie A ===
Pos	Team	Pld	W	L	PF	PA	PD	Pts	Qualification
12	Openjobmetis Varese	30	12	18	2470	2655	−185	24	
13	Dolomiti Energia Trento	30	11	19	2345	2447	−102	22	
14	GeVi Napoli	30	11	19	2393	2455	−62	22	
15	Fortitudo Kigili Bologna	30	9	21	2429	2511	−82	18	Relegation to Serie A2
16	Vanoli Cremona	30	8	22	2386	2535	−149	16	Relegation to Serie A2

Source: LBA
