= Vincent Sanford =

American basketball player (born 1990)

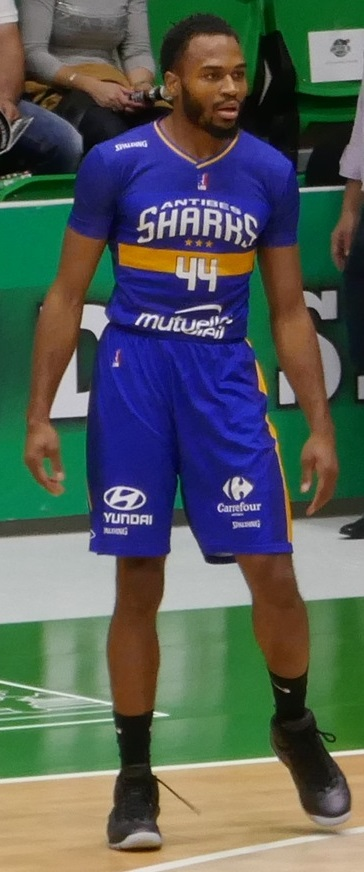

No. 44 – Hapoel Galil Elyon
- Position: Point guard / shooting guard
- League: Israeli Premier League

Personal information
- Born: December 5, 1990 (age 35) Lexington, Kentucky
- Listed height: 1.93 m (6 ft 4 in)
- Listed weight: 90 kg (198 lb)

Career information
- High school: Lexington Catholic (Lexington, Kentucky)
- College: Georgetown (2009–2011); Dayton (2012–2014)
- NBA draft: 2014: undrafted
- Playing career: 2014–present

Career history
- 2016–2017: s.Oliver Würzburg
- 2017–2018: Antibes Sharks
- 2018–2019: Élan Chalon
- 2019–2020: CSP Limoges
- 2020–2021: Élan Béarnais
- 2021–2022: Victoria Libertas Pesaro
- 2022–2023: Pallacanestro Forlì 2.015
- 2023: Hapoel Galil Elyon
- 2023: Kauhajoen Karhu

Vincent Laron "Vee" Sanford II (born December 5, 1990) is an American professional basketball player for Hapoel Galil Elyon of the Israeli Basketball Premier League. He played college basketball for Georgetown and Dayton.

== Early life ==
Sanford was born in Lexington, Kentucky. His parents are Vincent and Angela Sanford, and he has a sister, Nataliah. His father played basketball at the University of Kentucky, before transferring to South Florida University.

== High school ==
He attended Lexington Catholic High School, where he averaged 22.4 points, 4.8 rebounds, 2.5 steals and 2.4 assists a game in his senior season. He was picked The Courier-Journal First Team All-State, and was a McDonalds All-American nominee.

== College career ==
He played college basketball for Georgetown and Dayton.

In 2009-10 for Georgetown he played in 27 games, and averaged 1.2 points and 0.7 rebounds.

== Professional career ==
He began his professional career in 2016 with s.Oliver Würzburg. Sanford averaged 11.3 points and 2.4 assists per game during the 2019–20 season with Limoges. On May 24, 2020, Sanford parted ways with the team.

In the summer of 2017, Sanford II played in The Basketball Tournament on ESPN for the Broad Street Brawlers. He competed for the $2 million prize, and for the Brawlers, he averaged 24.5 points per game. Sanford III helped the Brawlers reach the second round of the tournament, only then losing to Team Colorado 111–95. He then Joined the Dayton alumni team, The Red Scare (basketball team), for the 2019 edition of The Basketball Tournament. They defeated The Region TBT in the first round before advancing past Mid American Unity 88–86 in the second round. They then lost to eventual champions Carmens Crew in the regional finals. Sanford is known for his ability to hit the midrange shot with a variety of pull-ups and floaters.

On July 29, 2020, he signed with Élan Béarnais of the French LNB Pro A. Sanford averaged 13.6 points, 3.3 rebounds, and 2.5 assists per game. On July 17, 2021, he signed with Victoria Libertas Pesaro of the Lega Basket Serie A.

On September 3, 2023, he signed with Hapoel Galil Elyon of the Israeli Basketball Premier League.
