= Josh Perkins =

American basketball player (born 1995)

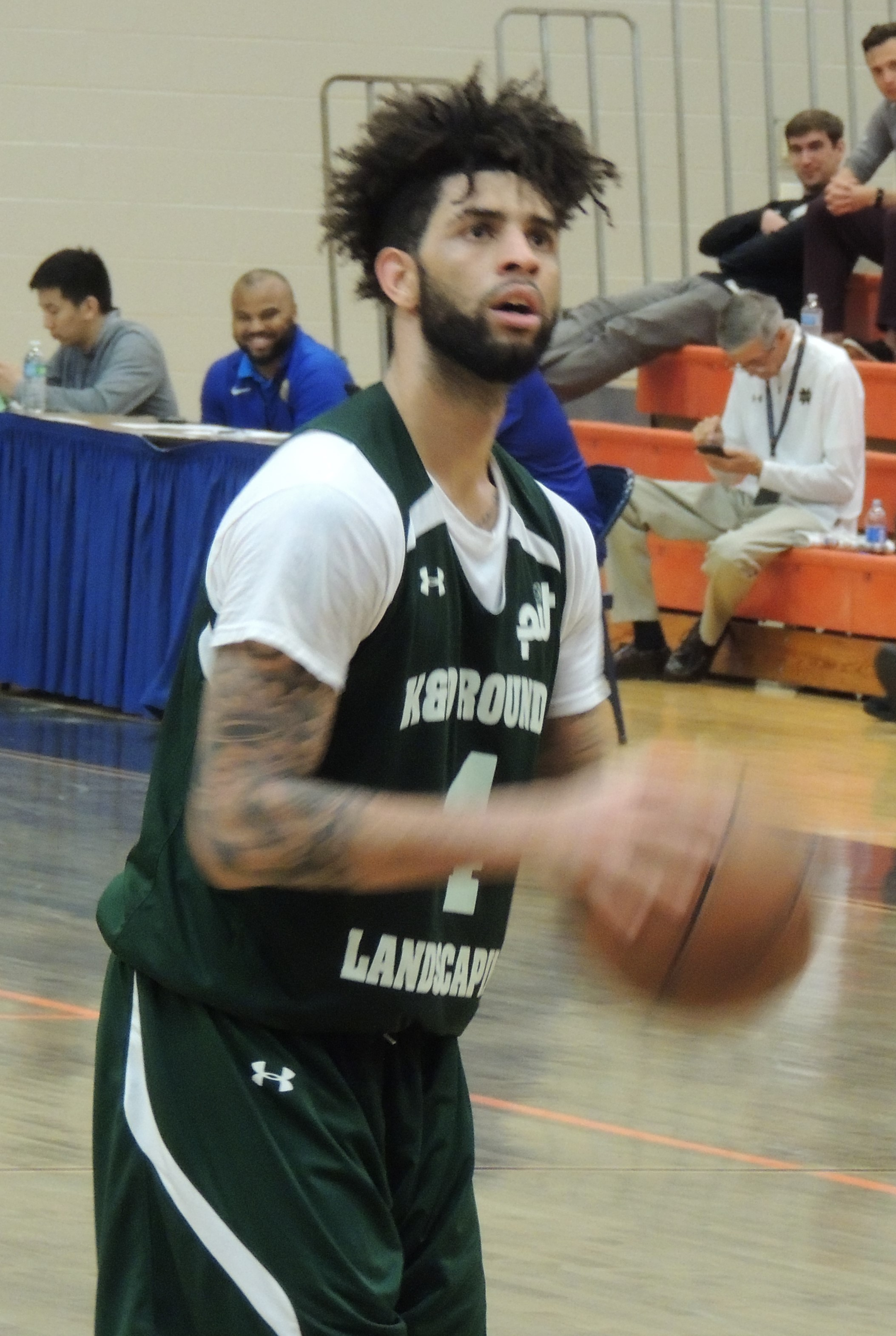
- Perkins at the Portsmouth Invitational Tournament in April 2019.

No. 3 – Halcones de Ciudad Obregón
- Position: Point guard
- League: CIBACOPA

Personal information
- Born: August 25, 1995 (age 31) Denver, Colorado, U.S.
- Listed height: 6 ft 3 in (1.91 m)
- Listed weight: 190 lb (86 kg)

Career information
- High school: Regis Jesuit (Aurora, Colorado); Huntington Prep (Huntington, West Virginia)
- College: Gonzaga (2014–2019)
- NBA draft: 2019: undrafted
- Playing career: 2019–present

Career history
- 2019–2020: Greensboro Swarm
- 2020: Texas Legends
- 2020–2021: GTK Gliwice
- 2021: Partizan
- 2021–2022: Brindisi
- 2022: Petkim Spor
- 2022: Brujos de Guayama
- 2022: Hapoel Gilboa Galil
- 2022–2023: Stal Ostrów Wielkopolski
- 2023: Petkim Spor
- 2023: BC Uralmash Yekaterinburg
- 2023–2024: Apollon Patras
- 2024: Panteras de Aguascalientes
- 2025: CS Maristes
- 2025–present: Halcones de Ciudad Obregón

Career highlights
- 2× First-team All-WCC (2018, 2019); WCC All-Freshman Team (2016)
- Stats at Basketball Reference

Joshua De Vante Perkins (born August 25, 1995) is an American professional basketball player for the Halcones de Ciudad Obregón of the CIBACOPA. He played college basketball for the Gonzaga Bulldogs.

== High school career ==
"Josh is the best passing PG I've seen. He has the ability to make everyone on his team better and is a true leader. He has really had a great spring and we are expecting a huge senior year from him. His ability to get his teammates involved has made recruiting a little easier this year! Guys want to play with him."

— Rob Fulford, Huntington Prep Head Coach.

Perkins began his high school career at Regis Jesuit High School in Aurora, Colorado. As a freshman, he helped lead his school to winning the Colorado 5A State Championship, coming off the bench to score 12 points in the title game.

As a sophomore, Perkins averaged 18.6 points, 5.2 assists, 4 rebounds, 2 steals, and a 1.51 assist-to-turnover ratio while shooting 56.1 percent from 2-point range, 34 percent from beyond the 3-point arc, and 81.8 percent from free throws.

In his junior year, Perkins averaged 25.2 points, 6.9 rebounds, 6.5 assists, 1.7 steals, and a 1.27 assist-to-turnover ratio while shooting 56.1 percent from 2-pointers, 29.2 percent on 3-point field goals, and 73.7 percent from the charity stripe. He led Colorado 5A in scoring and led Regis Jesuit to a 21–5 record, including 10–1 in the Continental League and a trip to the Colorado 5A State Semifinals. The Aurora Sentinel named Perkins Co-Player of the Year, and he also earned 5A All-State honors. MaxPreps named him an honorable mention to their Junior All-American team.

In the summer before his senior year, Perkins made a major decision to transfer from Regis Jesuit to prestigious high school basketball powerhouse, Huntington Prep in West Virginia. He wanted to be able to compete against strong competition on a regular basis and prepare himself for the college game before he would enroll in college a year later.

=== Recruiting ===
"Josh is probably one of our highest rated, if not highest rated, recruits we’ve been fortunate to sign here. He has a ton of potential at the point guard spot in that he can already shoot, he’s an excellent passer, is athletic enough and strong enough to get into the lane and make plays and finish at the rim. He’s a guy we have some high expectations for and somebody that should be ready to play next year."

— Mark Few, Gonzaga Head Coach.

In late June 2013, Perkins claimed he was being recruited the hardest by Gonzaga, UCLA, USC, Kansas, Kentucky, Syracuse, Connecticut, Baylor, and Minnesota. He said he had no favorites at the time, that he wanted to cut his list to 7-9 schools soon, and that he wanted a school with superior education, with coaches who will have his back and push him to bring out his best potential. In late July 2013, he cut his list to 5 schools (UCLA, Minnesota, Gonzaga, Uconn, and Kentucky). After naming his final 3 as UCLA, Gonzaga, and Minnesota a couple days before his decision, Josh Perkins commit to Gonzaga on August 24, 2013. Perkins signed with Gonzaga during the early signing period in November 2013.

College recruiting
Name	Hometown	School	Height	Weight	Commit date
Josh Perkins; PG	Denver, CO	Huntington Prep	6 ft 3 in (1.91 m)	186 lb (84 kg)	Aug 24, 2013
Josh Perkins; PG	Recruit ratings: Scout: Rivals: 247Sports: ESPN: (86)				
Overall recruit ranking: Scout: #80 Rivals: #67 247Sports: #76 ESPN: #56
Note: In many cases, Scout, Rivals, 247Sports, On3, and ESPN may conflict in their listings of height and weight.; In these cases, the average was taken. ESPN grades are on a 100-point scale.; Sources: "2014 Gonzaga Rivals Commits". Rivals.; "2014 Gonzaga Scout Commits". Scout.; "2014 Gonzaga ESPN Commits". ESPN.; "Scout.com Team Recruiting Rankings". Scout.; "2014 Team Ranking". Rivals.; "2014 Gonzaga 24/7 Sports Commits". 247Sports.

== College career ==
Josh Perkins' true freshman year was cut to only the first 5 games of the season, but he still averaged 5 points, 3.4 assists, 1 rebound, 0.8 steals, and a 1.7 assist-to-turnover ratio on 62.5 percent from 2-point range, 40 percent from beyond the 3-point line, and 75 percent from free throws in 20.2 minutes per game. He was a valuable player in practice and helped Gonzaga reach the Elite Eight for the first time since 1999, as well as a 2 seed in the NCAA Tournament and a 35–3 record (17–1 in the WCC).

In his first collegiate game, Josh Perkins scored 8 points, while adding 6 assists, 1 rebound, and 1 steal, on 2-of-3 from 3-point range and 2-of-2 free throws in a win over Sacramento State on November 14, 2014.

Perkins suffered a broken jaw in the fifth game on the season in a late November 2014 game in the NIT Season Tip-Off. Perkins pump-faked while driving to the hoop with the ball, but Georgia player Kenny Gaines jumped and kicked Perkins in the face. Perkins had to have his jaw wired shut due to the fracture and was ruled out indefinitely, with no timetable on his return. Four months later, he was still on the mend and still could not participate in any contact drills in practice. He was finally cleared to play with full contact in late April 2015. In August 2015, he was granted a medical hardship waiver, and which allowed him to have 4 years of eligibility remaining effective at the start of the 2015–16 season.

Perkins was named to the First Team All-West Coast Conference as a redshirt junior as well as Academic All-Conference. Perkins averaged 12.3 points and 5.3 assists per game in 2017–18. He had shoulder surgery in April 2018.

Coming into his senior season, Perkins was named to the Preseason All-WCC Team. As a senior, Perkins averaged 11 points and a career-high 6.3 assists per game. He became Gonzaga's all-time assists leader.

== Professional career ==
After going undrafted in the 2019 NBA draft, Perkins joined the Charlotte Hornets for the 2019 NBA Summer League. On August 6, 2019, Perkins signed an Exhibit 10 contract with the Hornets. He was released on October 13 during training camp. Following training camp, Perkins was added to the roster of the Hornets' NBA G League affiliate, the Greensboro Swarm.

On February 28, 2020, Perkins was traded to the Texas Legends alongside Tyler Nelson in exchange for Quincy Acy and a second-round pick in the 2020 G League draft.

On August 3, 2020, Perkins signed with GTK Gliwice of the PLK.

On January 4, 2021, Perkins signed with Partizan of the ABA League. On July 17, he signed with New Basket Brindisi of the Lega Basket Serie A (LBA). Perkins averaged 10.3 points, 5.7 assists, 3.7 rebounds, and 1.1 steals per game.

On February 7, 2022, he signed with Petkim Spor of the Basketbol Süper Ligi.

On May 15, 2022, he signed with Brujos de Guayama of the Baloncesto Superior Nacional (BSN).

On July 24, 2022, he signed with Hapoel Gilboa Galil of the Israeli Premier League.

On December 12, 2022, he signed with Stal Ostrów Wielkopolski of the Polish Basketball League (PLK).

On March 13, 2023, he signed with Petkim Spor of the Basketbol Süper Ligi (BSL).

Perkins started the 2023-2024 campaign with Russian side BC Uralmash Yekaterinburg, before moving to Greece for Apollon Patras on December 29, 2023. In 14 games, he averaged 7.8 points and 5.2 assists in 26 minutes of play.

On January 2, 2025, Perkins signed with the CS Maristes of the Lebanese Basketball League.

== Career statistics ==
Legend
GP	Games played	GS	Games started	MPG	Minutes per game
FG%	Field goal percentage	3P%	3-point field goal percentage	FT%	Free throw percentage
RPG	Rebounds per game	APG	Assists per game	SPG	Steals per game
BPG	Blocks per game	PPG	Points per game	**Bold**	Career high

=== College ===
Year	Team	GP	GS	MPG	FG%	3P%	FT%	RPG	APG	SPG	BPG	PPG
2014–15	Gonzaga	5	0	20.2	**.500**	**.400**	.750	1.0	3.4	.8	.2	5.0
2015–16	Gonzaga	36	36	30.8	.433	.378	.700	**3.3**	4.1	1.2	**.3**	10.1
2016–17	Gonzaga	**38**	35	29.1	.418	.399	.729	2.3	3.1	.9	.2	8.1
2017–18	Gonzaga	37	**37**	**32.9**	.439	.393	.753	3.1	5.3	1.2	.1	**12.3**
2018–19	Gonzaga	37	**37**	31.3	.454	.366	**.816**	2.7	**6.2**	**1.5**	.1	11.0
Career		153	145	30.6	.438	.386	.750	2.8	4.6	1.2	.2	10.2

== See also ==
- List of NCAA Division I men's basketball players with 147 games played
