= Unipol Arena =

Indoor sporting arena in the Province of Bologna, Italy

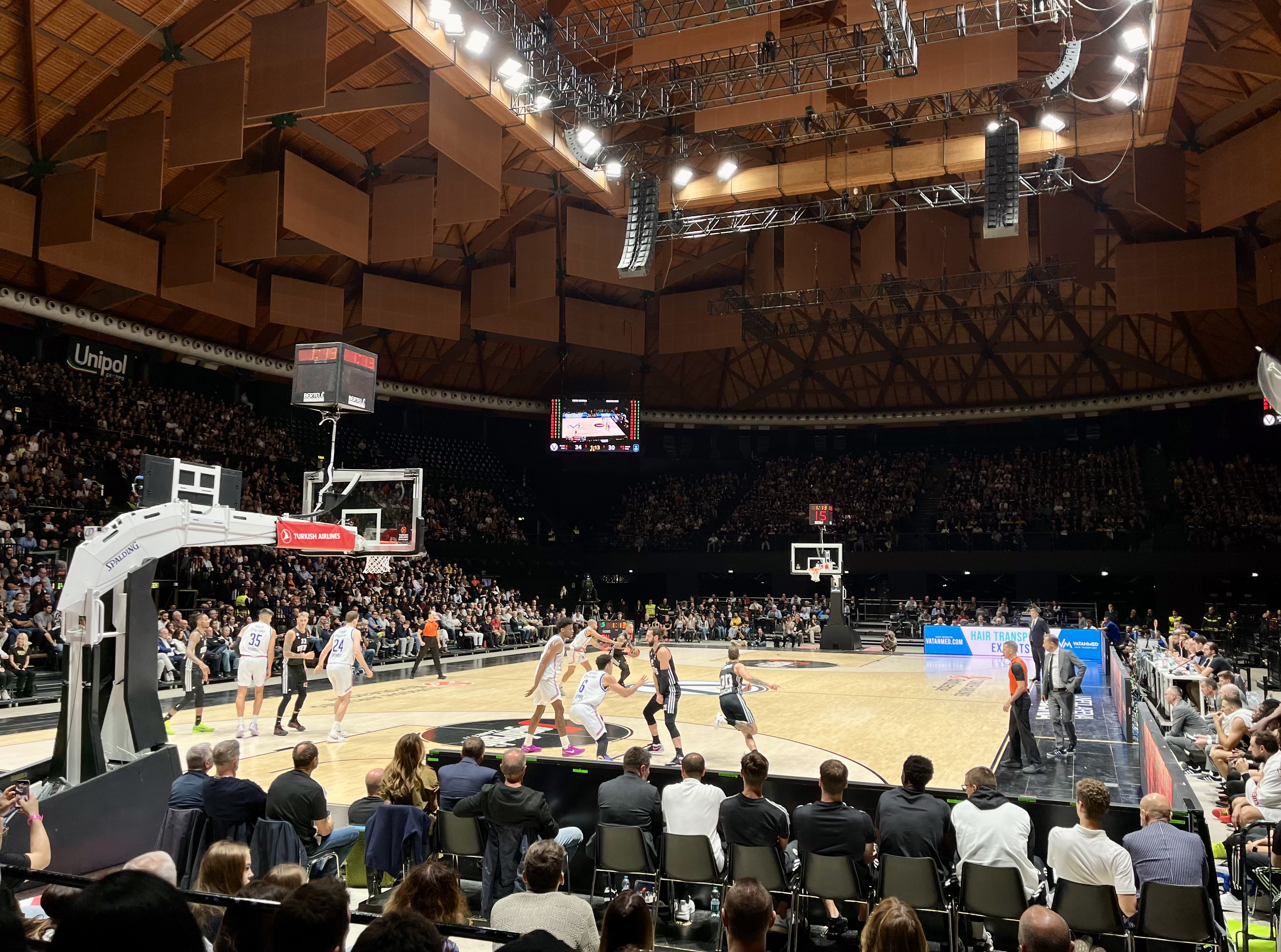
- Unipol Arena in 2024
- Interactive map of Unipol Arena
- Former names: Palasport Casalecchio (1993–1998); PalaMalaguti (1998–2008); Futurshow Station (2008–2011)
- Location: Via Gino Cervi, 2 40033 Casalecchio di Reno, Bologna
- Coordinates: 44°29′9.01″N 11°14′53.26″E
- Owner: Costructa Spa - Bologna
- Operator: Claudio Sabatini
- Capacity: Basketball: 11,000; Concerts: 20,000

Construction
- Built: 1991–1993
- Opened: December 1993
- Renovated: 2008–2009, 2016–2017
- Expanded: 2016
- Architects: Studio Arco (Mauro Checcoli, Maria Beatrice Bergamaschi), Luigi Villano and Franco Zarri

Tenants
- Virtus Bologna (1996–2017); Fortitudo Bologna (1997–1999, 2020–present)

Website
- www.unipolarena.it

Unipol Arena (previously known as Futurshow Station, PalaMalaguti and originally Palasport Casalecchio) is an indoor sporting arena located in Casalecchio di Reno, citta Metropolitana di Bologna, Italy. The seating capacity of the arena for basketball games is 11,000 people, and the seating capacity for concerts is 20,000 people. It was opened in December 1993. It was home to the Virtus Bologna basketball team from 1996 to 2017.

It is served by Casalecchio Palasport railway station.

== History ==
During the year 2008, the arena had restyling works, which included a new museum dedicated to Virtus' history, four new JumboTrons, new white seats and black stairs, and new white parquet. In October 2011, the arena changed its name to the current Unipol Arena, in a name sponsorship marketing deal, which was scheduled to last through 2016.

In summer 2016, the capacity of the arena for basketball games was increased from 8,650 up to 11,000. Other museums were also built, one dedicated to Futurshow, and another to Luciano Pavarotti.

== Entertainment ==
Entertainment events at the Unipol Arena
Date	Nationality	Artists	Tours	Opening/supporting acts	Attendance	Box office
2005
November 15	United Kingdom	Coldplay	Twisted Logic Tour	—N/a	—N/a	—N/a
2008
September 29	United Kingdom	Coldplay	Viva la Vida Tour	—N/a	—N/a	—N/a
2011
November 26	United Kingdom	Paul McCartney	On the Run	—N/a	—N/a	—N/a
2012
October 11	United States	Jennifer Lopez	Dance Again World Tour	—N/a	11,746 / 13,910	$885,945
October 23	United Kingdom; United States	Slash	Apocalyptic Love World Tour	—N/a	—N/a	—N/a
November 16	United Kingdom	Muse	The 2nd Law World Tour	Everything Everything	—N/a	—N/a
December 12	United States	Rob Zombie; Marilyn Manson	Twins of Evil Tour	—N/a	—N/a	—N/a
2013
March 23	Canada	Justin Bieber	Believe Tour	Carly Rae Jepsen	—N/a	—N/a
April 26	Germany	Rammstein	Made in Germany 1995–2011	Joe Letz	—N/a	—N/a
June 6	United States	Green Day	99 Revolutions Tour	All Time Low	—N/a	—N/a
2014
January 6	Argentina	Violetta	Violetta en Vivo	—N/a	—N/a	—N/a
February 22	United Kingdom	Depeche Mode	The Delta Machine Tour	Choir of Young Believers	12,833 / 12,833	$981,579
June 3	United States	Nine Inch Nails	Twenty Thirteen Tour	Cold Cave	—N/a	—N/a
June 18	United Kingdom	Black Sabbath	Black Sabbath Reunion Tour	Black Label Society; Reignwolf	—N/a	—N/a
November 8	Canada	Michael Bublé	To Be Loved Tour	—N/a	—N/a	—N/a
November 21	United Kingdom	Peter Gabriel	Back to Front Tour	—N/a	—N/a	—N/a
2015
February 1	Argentina	Violetta	Violetta Live	—N/a	—N/a	—N/a
November 13	United States	Foo Fighters	Sonic Highways World Tour	Trombone Shorty	—N/a	—N/a
November 29	Finland	Nightwish	Endless Forms Most Beautiful World Tour	Arch Enemy; Amorphis	—N/a	—N/a
2016
April 13	United Kingdom	Florence and the Machine	How Big, How Blue, How Beautiful Tour	Gabriel Bruce	—N/a	—N/a
September 17	United Kingdom	The Who	Back to the Who Tour 51!	—N/a	—N/a	—N/a
October 8	United States	Red Hot Chili Peppers	The Getaway World Tour	La Femme	—N/a	—N/a
November 19	Canada	Justin Bieber	Purpose World Tour	The Knocks; MiC Lowry	27,418 / 27,418	$2,033,361
November 20	Canada	Justin Bieber	Purpose World Tour	The Knocks; MiC Lowry	27,418 / 27,418	$2,033,361
2017
January 13	United States	Green Day	Revolution Radio Tour	The Interrupters	—N/a	—N/a
May 16	United States	Kiss	Kissworld Tour	—N/a	—N/a	—N/a
May 19	Spain	Enrique Iglesias	Sex and Love Tour	—N/a	12,789 / 13,905	—N/a
June 12	United States	Bruno Mars	24K Magic World Tour	Anderson .Paak	14,246 / 14,246	$850,732
June 26	United Kingdom	Deep Purple	The Long Goodbye Tour	—N/a	—N/a	—N/a
November 4	United States	Queens of the Stone Age	Villains World Tour	Broncho	—N/a	—N/a
November 10	United Kingdom; United States	Queen; Adam Lambert	Queen + Adam Lambert Tour 2017–2018	—N/a	—N/a	—N/a
December 13	United Kingdom	Depeche Mode	Global Spirit Tour	Pumarosa	—N/a	—N/a
2018
February 9	Argentina	Soy Luna	Soy Luna Live	—N/a	—N/a	—N/a
February 12	United States	Metallica	WorldWired Tour	Kvelertak	—N/a	—N/a
February 14	United States	Metallica	WorldWired Tour	Kvelertak	—N/a	—N/a
March 17	United States	Thirty Seconds to Mars	The Monolith Tour	—N/a	TBA	TBA
April 4	United Kingdom	Harry Styles	Harry Styles: Live on Tour	Mabel	TBA	TBA
April 21	United Kingdom	Roger Waters	Us + Them Tour	—N/a	TBA	TBA
April 22	United Kingdom	Roger Waters	Us + Them Tour	—N/a	TBA	TBA
April 24	United Kingdom	Roger Waters	Us + Them Tour	—N/a	TBA	TBA
April 25	United Kingdom	Roger Waters	Us + Them Tour	—N/a	TBA	TBA
May 6	Ireland	Niall Horan	Flicker World Tour	Julia Michaels	TBA	TBA
June 2	United States	Katy Perry	Witness: The Tour	Tove Styrke	TBA	TBA
June 27	United States	Demi Lovato	Tell Me You Love Me World Tour	Joy	TBA	TBA
2019
March 23	Canada	Shawn Mendes	Shawn Mendes The Tour	TBA	TBA	TBA
2020
June 8	United Kingdom	Eric Clapton	Eric Clapton Summer European Tour 2020	TBA	TBA	TBA
2022
May 28	United Kingdom	Dua Lipa	Future Nostalgia Tour	Griff	TBA	TBA
May 28	United Kingdom	Harry Styles	Love On Tour	Wolf Alice	12,699 / 12,699	$912,467
2023
January 20	United Kingdom	Robbie Williams	XXV Tour	TBA	TBA	TBA
2024
February 24	United States	Kanye West and Ty Dolla Sign	Vultures 1 listening event	—N/a	TBA	—N/a
June 9	United States	Olivia Rodrigo	Guts World Tour	TBA	TBA	TBA
October 18	United States	Melanie Martinez	The Trilogy Tour	Elita Men I Trust	TBA	TBA
2025
November 2	United States	Katy Perry	The Lifetimes Tour	TBA	TBA	TBA
November 14	United Kingdom	Radiohead	2025 Radiohead tour	—N/a	TBA	TBA
November 15	United Kingdom	Radiohead	2025 Radiohead tour	—N/a	TBA	TBA
November 17	United Kingdom	Radiohead	2025 Radiohead tour	—N/a	TBA	TBA
November 18	United Kingdom	Radiohead	2025 Radiohead tour	—N/a	TBA	TBA
December 6	Italy	Giorgia	Palasport Live	—N/a	9.000 / 9.000	—N/a
2026
January 30	United Kingdom	Raye	This Tour May Contain New Music	Absolutely; Amma	TBA	TBA
February 15	United States	MGK	Lost Americana Tour	Julia Wolf	TBA	TBA
March 21	Italy	Giorgia	Palasport Live	—N/a	—N/a	—N/a
April 4	various	Various artists	K-Pop Forever!	—N/a	—N/a	—N/a

== See also ==
- List of indoor arenas in Italy

Preceded by Palais de Paris-Bercy; Paris	EuroLeague; Final Four; Venue; 2002	Succeeded by Palau Sant Jordi; Barcelona
Preceded by Martín Carpena Arena	Davis Cup; Finals Venue; 2025	Succeeded by
