= Casalecchio di Reno =

- Comune
- Comune di Casalecchio di Reno
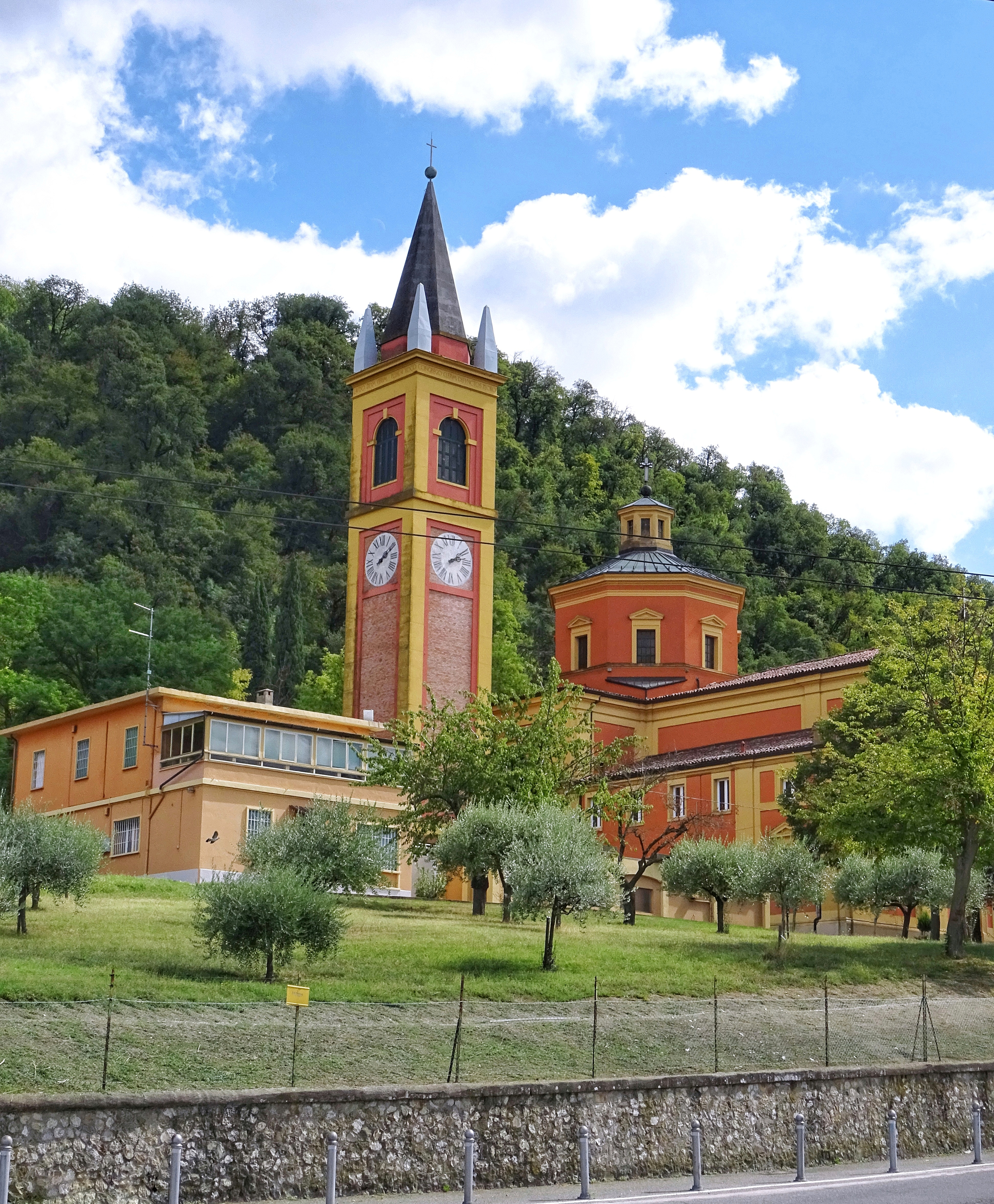
- San Martino church.

- Location within Italy Location within Emilia-Romagna
- Coordinates: 44°29′N 11°17′E
- Country: Italy
- Region: Emilia-Romagna
- Metropolitan city: Bologna (BO)
- Frazioni: Old frazioni have been replaced by five zones: Croce, Centro (or Garibaldi), Ceretolo, San Biagio, Tizzano Eremo

Government
  - Mayor: Matteo Ruggeri (PD)

Area
  - Total: 17.33 km^{2} (6.69 sq mi)
- Elevation: 61 m (200 ft)

Population (31 May 2017)
  - Total: 36,517
  - Density: 2,107/km^{2} (5,458/sq mi)
- Demonym: Casalecchiesi
- Time zone: UTC+1 (CET)
  - Summer (DST): UTC+2 (CEST)
- Postal code: 40033
- Dialing code: 051
- Patron saint: Saint Martin of Tours
- Saint day: 11 November
- Website: Official website

Casalecchio di Reno (Bolognese: Caṡalàcc') is a town and comune in the Metropolitan City of Bologna, Emilia-Romagna, northern Italy.

== History ==
Casalecchio's name is derived from Casaliculum ("collection of little houses"), and from the presence of the Reno River. The site has archaeological treasures dating from the Paleolithic and Villanovan eras; Celtic and Etruscan remains have also been found. This is the site of the Celtic city of Casalecchio, one of the few exclusively Celtic settlements of Northern Italy or Cisalpine Gaul. It likely belonged to the Celtic tribe of the Boii, who settled this area around 400 BC.

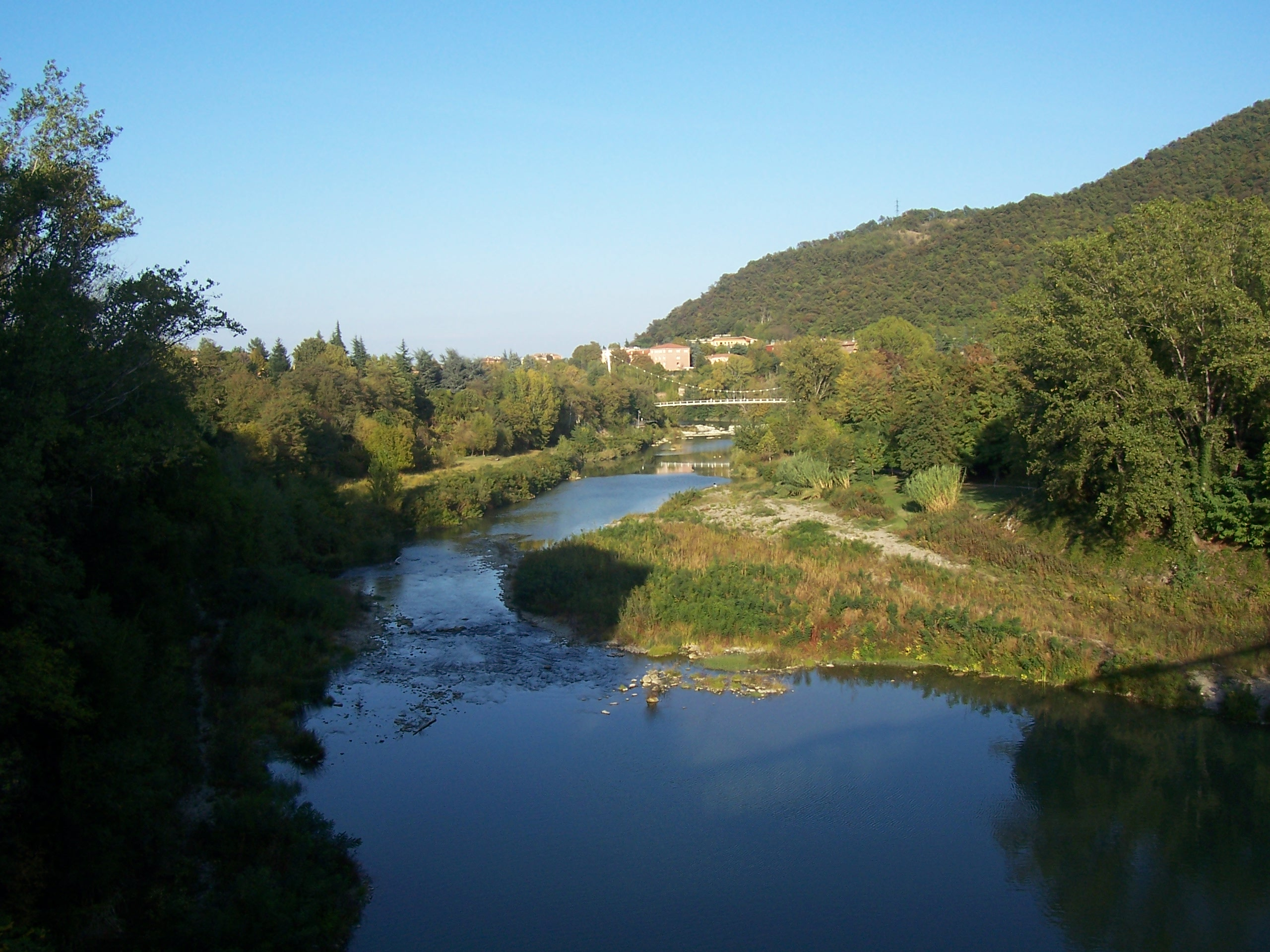
The Reno River at Casalecchio

The Battle of Casalecchio took place here on 26 June 1402. Casalecchio was heavily damaged by Allied bombers during World War II.

On 6 December 1990, an MB-326 military jet of the Italian Air Force crashed into the Gaetano Salvemini Technical Institute, a high school, killing twelve students and injuring 88 other students and staff. The aircraft had been abandoned minutes earlier by its pilot following an onboard fire.

== Economy ==
The commune has the headquarters of the cooperative Coop.

== International relations ==
Casalecchio di Reno is twinned with:

- Pápa, Hungary
- Romainville, France
- Trenčín, Slovakia
