= 2021–22 FIBA Europe Cup Play-offs =

Sport season

The 2021–22 FIBA Europe Cup play-offs began on 9 March and concluded on 20 and 27 April 2022 with the 2022 FIBA Europe Cup Finals, decided the champions of the 2021–22 FIBA Europe Cup. A total of eight teams competed in the play-offs.

== Format ==
Each tie in the knockout phase, was played over two legs, with each team playing one leg at home.

== Bracket ==
Quarter-finals; 9, 10 & 16 March
(Netherlands) ZZ Leiden	68	85	153
(Germany) Hakro Merlins Crailsheim	71	77	148
(Turkey) Bahçeşehir Koleji	73	66	139
(Portugal) Sporting CP	70	54	124
(Italy) UnaHotels Reggio Emilia	71	80	151
(Poland) Legia Warsaw	68	75	143
(Romania) Oradea	82	61	143
(Denmark) Bakken Bears	84	70	154

Semi-finals; 30 March & 6 April
(Netherlands) ZZ Leiden	71	82	153
(Turkey) Bahçeşehir Koleji	77	90	167
(Italy) UnaHotels Reggio Emilia	72	92	164
(Denmark) Bakken Bears	74	72	146

Finals; 20 & 27 April
(Turkey) Bahçeşehir Koleji	72	90	162
(Italy) UnaHotels Reggio Emilia	69	74	143

== Quarterfinals ==
The first legs were played on 9 and 10 March 2022, and the second legs were played on 16 March 2022.

Team 1	Agg.	Team 2	1st leg	2nd leg
ZZ Leiden (Netherlands)	153–148	(Germany) Hakro Merlins Crailsheim	71–68	85–77
Oradea (Romania)	143–154	(Denmark) Bakken Bears	82–84	61–70
UnaHotels Reggio Emilia (Italy)	151–143	(Poland) Legia Warsaw	71–68	80–75
Bahçeşehir Koleji (Turkey)	139–124	(Portugal) Sporting CP	73–70	66–54

=== ZZ Leiden vs. Hakro Merlins Crailsheim ===
9 March 2022	Hakro Merlins Crailsheim (Germany)	71–68	(Netherlands) ZZ Leiden	Crailsheim
19:00	Scoring by quarter: 11–15, 23–22, 16–22, 21–16
	Pts: Radosavljević 15; Rebs: Lewis 7 Asts: Shorts 4 Eff: Lewis 18	Boxscore	Pts: Mikalauskas 15; Rebs: Midtgaard 11; Asts: de Jong 4 Eff: Tubutis 14	Arena: Arena Hohenlohe; Referees: Tanel Suslov, Blaž Zupančič, Ventsislav Velikov

16 March 2022	ZZ Leiden (Netherlands)	85–77	(Germany) Hakro Merlins Crailsheim	Leiden
19:30	Scoring by quarter: 23–24, 30–25, 19–11, 13–17
	Pts: Bouwknecht 23; Rebs: Tubutis 13; Asts: Mikalauskas 5 Eff: Bouwknecht 24	Boxscore	Pts: Harris 18; Rebs: Bleck 11; Asts: Harris, Shorts 5 Eff: Bleck 22	Arena: Vijf Meihal; Attendance: 1,866; Referees: Gintaras Vitkauskas, Vladimir Jevtović, Valerio Grigioni

=== Oradea vs. Bakken Bears ===
9 March 2022	Bakken Bears (Denmark)	84–82	(Romania) Oradea	Aarhus
18:30	Scoring by quarter: 20–22, 17–22, 34–18, 13–20
	Pts: Harris 27; Rebs: Taylor 6 Asts: Ogungbemi-Jackson, Taylor 3 Eff: Harris 31	Boxscore	Pts: Bickauskis 16; Rebs: Gavrilovic 9 Asts: Bickauskis, Green 4 Eff: Bickauskis 16	Arena: Vejlby-Risskov Hallen; Referees: Igor Mitrovski, Mehmet Şahin, Josip Jurčević

16 March 2022	Oradea (Romania)	61–70	(Denmark) Bakken Bears	Oradea
18:00	Scoring by quarter: 19–23, 15–15, 15–14, 12–18
	Pts: Richard 13; Rebs: Ogden 7 Asts: Holt 6 Eff: Green 12	Boxscore	Pts: Harris 23; Rebs: Taylor 10; Asts: Ongwae 3 Eff: Harris 18	Arena: Arena Antonio Alexe; Referees: Ivor Matejek, Can Mavisu, Siniša Prpa

=== UnaHotels Reggio Emilia vs. Legia Warsaw ===
9 March 2022	Legia Warsaw (Poland)	68–71	(Italy) UnaHotels Reggio Emilia	Warsaw
18:15	Scoring by quarter: 23–16, 10–19, 20–20, 15–16
	Pts: Cowels 19; Rebs: Johnson 7 Asts: Koszarek 8 Eff: Kulka 18	Boxscore	Pts: Hopkins 13; Rebs: Hopkins, Strautiņš 10; Asts: Cinciarini 14; Eff: Hopkins 18	Arena: Cos Torwar; Referees: Andris Aunkrogers, Franko Gracin, Valentin Oliot

16 March 2022	UnaHotels Reggio Emilia (Italy)	80–75(OT)	(Poland) Legia Warsaw	Reggio Emilia
20:30	Scoring by quarter: 21-17, 16-16, 19-18, 12-20, Overtime: 12-4
	Pts: Cinciarini 19; Rebs: two players 10; Asts: Cinciarini 14; Eff: Cinciarini 24	Boxscore	Pts: Johnson 23; Rebs: Skifić 8 Asts: four players 3 Eff: Johnson 10	Arena: PalaBigi; Referees: Petr Hrusa, Goran Sljivic, Zdravko Rutesic

=== Bahçeşehir Koleji vs. Sporting CP ===
10 March 2022	Sporting CP (Portugal)	70–73	(Turkey) Bahçeşehir Koleji	Lisbon
18:15	Scoring by quarter: 12–17, 22–22, 15–18, 21–16
	Pts: Williams 25; Rebs: Williams 9 Asts: Downs 5 Eff: Williams 23	Boxscore	Pts: Dekker 18; Rebs: Dekker 7 Asts: Smith 7 Eff: Dekker 22	Arena: Pavilhão João Rocha; Referees: Petros Papapetrou, Alexandre Deman, Beniamino Attard

16 March 2022	Bahçeşehir Koleji (Turkey)	66–54	(Portugal) Sporting CP	Istanbul
18:00	Scoring by quarter: 15–19, 13–20, 13-7, 25-8
	Pts: Smith 16; Rebs: Dekker 7 Asts: Smith 6 Eff: Smith 19	Boxscore	Pts: Omlid 10; Rebs: Patton 5 Asts: Ventura 16; Eff: Omlid 16	Arena: Ülker Sports Arena; Referees: Marius Ciulin, Marko Vuckovic, Gintaras Maciulis

== Semifinals ==
The first legs were played on 30 March 2022, and the second legs were played on 6 April 2022.

Team 1	Agg.	Team 2	1st leg	2nd leg
ZZ Leiden (Netherlands)	153–167	(Turkey) Bahçeşehir Koleji	71–77	82–90
UnaHotels Reggio Emilia (Italy)	164–146	(Denmark) Bakken Bears	72–74	92–72

=== ZZ Leiden vs. Bahçeşehir Koleji ===
30 March 2022	ZZ Leiden (Netherlands)	71–77	(Turkey) Bahçeşehir Koleji	Leiden
19:30	Scoring by quarter: 19–16, 19–17, 20–18, 13–26
	Pts: Dunn 17; Rebs: Midtgaard 8 Asts: Bouwknecht, de Jong 5 Eff: Midtgaard 16	Boxscore	Pts: Savaş 16; Rebs: Savaş, Yılmaz 6 Asts: Baygül, Özmızrak 3 Eff: Savaş 21	Arena: Vijf Meihal; Attendance: 2,000; Referees: Ivor Matějek, Francisco Araña, Carsten Straube

6 April 2022	Bahçeşehir Koleji (Turkey)	90–82	(Netherlands) ZZ Leiden	Istanbul
19:00	Scoring by quarter: 25–19, 21–19, 26–19, 18–25
	Pts: Özmızrak 24; Rebs: Solomon 8 Asts: Hall 6 Eff: Özmızrak 26	Boxscore	Pts: Dunn 21; Rebs: Midtgaard 6 Asts: de Jong 10; Eff: Mikalauskas 17	Arena: Ülker Sports Arena; Referees: Michał Proc, Geert Jacobs, Zdravko Rutesic

=== UnaHotels Reggio Emilia vs. Bakken Bears ===
30 March 2022	Bakken Bears (Denmark)	74–72	(Italy) UnaHotels Reggio Emilia	Aarhus
18:30	Scoring by quarter: 18–17, 30–24, 16–15, 10–16
	Pts: Diouf 19; Rebs: Evans, Taylor 7 Asts: three players 4 Eff: Diouf 11	Boxscore	Pts: Johnson 19; Rebs: Strautiņš 13; Asts: Cinciarini 16; Eff: Strautiņš 23	Arena: Vejlby-Risskov Hallen; Referees: Thomas Bissuel, Ventsislav Velikov, Vladimir Jevtović

6 April 2022	UnaHotels Reggio Emilia (Italy)	92–72	(Denmark) Bakken Bears	Casalecchio di Reno
20:30	Scoring by quarter: 31–10, 24–27, 22–19, 15–16
	Pts: Johnson 16; Rebs: Johnson 11; Asts: Cinciarini 18; Eff: Cinciarini 28	Boxscore	Pts: Taylor 15; Rebs: Taylor 13; Asts: Ogungbemi-Jackson 5 Eff: Taylor 25	Arena: Unipol Arena; Attendance: 1,859; Referees: Gvidas Gedvilas, Dariusz Zapolski, Marek Kukelcik

== Finals ==
The first leg was played on 20 April 2022, and the second legs was played on 27 April 2022.

Team 1	Agg.	Team 2	1st leg	2nd leg
UnaHotels Reggio Emilia (Italy)	143–162	(Turkey) Bahçeşehir Koleji	69–72	74–90

20 April 2022	UnaHotels Reggio Emilia (Italy)	69–72	(Turkey) Bahçeşehir Koleji	Casalecchio di Reno
20:30 (UTC +2)	Scoring by quarter: 18–19, 16–21, 13–23, 22–9
	Pts: Cinciarini 20; Rebs: Hopkins, Strautiņš 8 Asts: Cinciarini 9 Eff: Cinciarini 21	Boxscore	Pts: Jones 12; Rebs: Dekker 6 Asts: Hall 6 Eff: Dekker 14	Arena: Unipol Arena; Attendance: 3,513; Referees: Fernando Calatrava, Nicolas Maestre, Carsten Straube

27 April 2022	Bahçeşehir Koleji (Turkey)	90–74	(Italy) UnaHotels Reggio Emilia	Istanbul
20:00 (UTC +3)	Scoring by quarter: 30–16, 13–21, 21–19, 26–18
	Pts: Smith 17; Rebs: Dekker 5 Asts: Özmızrak, Smith 4 Eff: three players 15	Boxscore	Pts: Strautiņš, Thompson 19; Rebs: Strautiņš 11; Asts: Cinciarini 9 Eff: Strautiņš 22	Arena: Ülker Sports Arena; Attendance: 13,485; Referees: Luis Castillo, Oskars Lucis, Wojciech Liszka
