= 2022 FIBA Europe Cup Finals =

Europe Basketball Cup Finals

- Event: 2021–22 FIBA Europe Cup
UnaHotels Reggio Emilia	Bahçeşehir Koleji
(Italy)	(Turkey)
143	162

First leg
UnaHotels Reggio Emilia	Bahçeşehir Koleji
69	72
- Date: 20 April 2022
- Venue: Unipol Arena, Casalecchio di Reno
- MVP: Jamar Smith
- Attendance: 3,513

Second leg
Bahçeşehir Koleji	UnaHotels Reggio Emilia
90	74
- Date: 27 April 2022
- Venue: Ülker Sports Arena, Istanbul
- Attendance: 13,485

The 2022 FIBA Europe Cup Finals were the concluding games of the 2021–22 FIBA Europe Cup season. The Finals were played in a two-legged format, with the first leg being played on April 20 and the second one on 27 April 2022. The finals were played between Bahçeşehir Koleji and UnaHotels Reggio Emilia. Both teams were appear in their first FIBA Europe Cup final, as well as their first European final.

Bahçeşehir won its first European championship after defeating Reggiana in both legs. The second leg was attended by 13,485 spectators, setting a new FIBA Europe Cup record. Jamar Smith won the league's Finals MVP award.

== Venues ==
Casalecchio di Reno	2022 FIBA Europe Cup Finals (Europe)	Istanbul
Unipol Arena	2022 FIBA Europe Cup Finals (Europe)	Ülker Sports Arena
Capacity: 11,000	2022 FIBA Europe Cup Finals (Europe)	Capacity: 13,800

== Road to the Finals ==
Note: In the table, the score of the finalist is given first (H = home; A = away).

(Turkey) Bahçeşehir Koleji				Round	(Italy) UnaHotels Reggio Emilia			
Group E: Pos / Team / Pld / Pts; 1 / (Turkey) Bahçeşehir Koleji / 6 / 12; 2 / (Netherlands) ZZ Leiden / 6 / 9; 3 / (Montenegro) Mornar / 6 / 8; 4 / (Greece) Iraklis / 6 / 7; Source: Groups Standings				Regular season	Group D: Pos / Team / Pld / Pts; 1 / (Russia) Avtodor / 6 / 11; 2 / (Italy) Reggiana / 6 / 10; 3 / (Spain) Casademont Zaragoza / 6 / 8; 4 / (Israel) Hapoel Gilboa Galil / 6 / 7; Source: Groups Standings			
Group L: Pos / Team / Pld / Pts; 1 / (Turkey) Bahçeşehir Koleji / 6 / 11; 2 / (Denmark) Bakken Bears / 6 / 7; 3 / (United Kingdom) London Lions / 6 / 7; 4 / (Russia) Avtodor / 6 / 11; Source: Second Round Standings				Second round	Group J: Pos / Team / Pld / Pts; 1 / (Italy) Reggiana / 6 / 11; 2 / (Germany) Hakro Merlins Crailsheim / 6 / 9; 3 / (Belgium) Telenet Giants Antwerp / 6 / 8; 4 / (Ukraine) Kyiv-Basket / 6 / 7; Source: Second Round Standings			
Opponent	Agg.	1st leg	2nd leg	Play-offs	Opponent	Agg.	1st leg	2nd leg
(Portugal) Sporting CP	139–124	73–70 (A)	66–54 (H)	Quarterfinals	(Poland) Legia Warsaw	151–143	71–68 (A)	80–75 (H)
(Netherlands) ZZ Leiden	167–153	77–71 (A)	90–82 (H)	Semifinals	(Denmark) Bakken Bears	164–146	72–74 (A)	92–72 (H)

== First leg ==
20 April 2022	UnaHotels Reggio Emilia (Italy)	69–72	(Turkey) Bahçeşehir Koleji	Casalecchio di Reno
20:30 (UTC +2)	Scoring by quarter: 18–19, 16–21, 13–23, 22–9
	Pts: Cinciarini 20; Rebs: Hopkins, Strautiņš 8 Asts: Cinciarini 9 Eff: Cinciarini 21	Boxscore	Pts: Jones 12; Rebs: Dekker 6 Asts: Hall 6 Eff: Dekker 14	Arena: Unipol Arena; Attendance: 3,513; Referees: Fernando Calatrava, Nicolas Maestre, Carsten Straube

Starters:			Pts	Reb	Ast
PG	20	(Italy) Andrea Cinciarini	20	1	9
SG	55	(United States) Tyler Larson	0	2	2
SF	12	(Latvia) Artūrs Strautiņš	8	8	0
PF	23	(United States) Justin Johnson	16	7	0
C	5	(Italy) Mikael Hopkins	6	8	2
Reserves:					
G	1	(Puerto Rico) Stephen Thompson	9	2	2
PF	8	(Italy) Filippo Baldi Rossi	5	4	1
SF	10	(Italy) Jacopo Soliani	DNP		
PG	13	(United States) Bryant Crawford	5	1	0
G	15	(Italy) Stefano Colombo	DNP		
Head coach:
(Italian Basketball Federation) Attilio Caja

Reggiana	Bahçeşehir

Reggiana	Statistics	Bahçeşehir
12/28 (43%)	2-pt field goals	17/24 (71%)
9/28 (32%)	3-pt field goals	10/28 (36%)
18/22 (82%)	Free throws	8/15 (53%)
11	Offensive rebounds	4
23	Defensive rebounds	23
34	Total rebounds	27
16	Assists	15
9	Turnovers	10
6	Steals	3
0	Blocks	4
16	Fouls	22

Starters:			Pts	Reb	Ast
PG	15	(United States) Jamar Smith	11	2	3
SG	2	(United States) Langston Hall	6	2	6
SF	5	(Turkey) Muhammed Baygül	4	2	2
PF	32	(Turkey) Berkay Candan	7	0	1
C	21	(Turkey) Oğuz Savaş	0	0	0
Reserves:					
G	1	(United States) Jamal Jones	12	2	0
PG	3	(Turkey) Kartal Özmızrak	11	0	3
PF	8	(Turkey) Hadi Özdemir	DNP		
C	9	(United States) Tarik Black	2	2	1
F	17	(United States) Sam Dekker	10	6	0
PF	23	(United States) Richard Solomon	9	5	1
SF	33	(Turkey) Erkan Yılmaz	0	0	0
Head coach:
(Turkish Basketball Federation) Erhan Ernak

- Team captains (C): (Italy) Andrea Cinciarini (Reggio Emilia) and (Turkey) Oğuz Savaş (Bahçeşehir Koleji)

== Second leg ==
27 April 2022	Bahçeşehir Koleji (Turkey)	90–74	(Italy) UnaHotels Reggio Emilia	Istanbul
20:00 (UTC +3)	Scoring by quarter: 30–16, 13–21, 21–19, 26–18
	Pts: Smith 17; Rebs: Dekker, Savaş 5 Asts: Özmızrak, Smith 4 Eff: three players 15	Boxscore	Pts: Strautiņš, Thompson 19; Rebs: Strautiņš 11; Asts: Cinciarini 9 Eff: Strautiņš 22	Arena: Ülker Sports Arena; Attendance: 13,485; Referees: Luis Castillo, Oskars Lucis, Wojciech Liszka

Starters:			Pts	Reb	Ast
PG	15	(United States) Jamar Smith	17	1	4
SG	2	(United States) Langston Hall	2	2	3
SF	1	(United States) Jamal Jones	14	2	1
PF	32	(Turkey) Berkay Candan	7	2	1
C	21	(Turkey) Oğuz Savaş	5	5	1
Reserves:					
PG	3	(Turkey) Kartal Özmızrak	7	4	4
SF	5	(Turkey) Muhammed Baygül	6	1	0
PF	8	(Turkey) Hadi Özdemir	0	0	0
C	9	(United States) Tarik Black	12	3	3
F	17	(United States) Sam Dekker	12	5	1
PF	23	(United States) Richard Solomon	4	2	0
SF	33	(Turkey) Erkan Yılmaz	4	3	2
Head coach:
(Turkish Basketball Federation) Erhan Ernak

Bahçeşehir	Reggiana

Bahçeşehir	Statistics	Reggiana
16/26 (62%)	2-pt field goals	11/27 (41%)
12/27 (44%)	3-pt field goals	14/35 (40%)
22/31 (71%)	Free throws	10/13 (77%)
7	Offensive rebounds	13
23	Defensive rebounds	22
30	Total rebounds	35
20	Assists	19
9	Turnovers	15
6	Steals	5
2	Blocks	1
16	Fouls	25

Starters:			Pts	Reb	Ast
PG	20	(Italy) Andrea Cinciarini	8	1	9
SG	55	(United States) Tyler Larson	0	1	0
SF	12	(Latvia) Artūrs Strautiņš	19	11	2
PF	23	(United States) Justin Johnson	9	4	0
C	5	(Italy) Mikael Hopkins	9	4	2
Reserves:					
G	1	(Puerto Rico) Stephen Thompson	19	1	3
PF	8	(Italy) Filippo Baldi Rossi	8	5	1
SF	10	(Italy) Jacopo Soliani	DNP		
PG	13	(United States) Bryant Crawford	2	2	2
G	15	(Italy) Stefano Colombo	DNP		
Head coach:
(Italian Basketball Federation) Attilio Caja

- Team captains (C): (Turkey) Oğuz Savaş (Bahçeşehir Koleji) and (Italy) Andrea Cinciarini (Reggio Emilia)

== See also ==
- 2022 EuroLeague Final Four
- 2022 EuroCup Final
- 2022 Basketball Champions League Final Four
