= 2021–22 Pallacanestro Reggiana season =

Pallacanestro Reggiana
2021–22 season
- Owner: Stefano Landi; Veronica Bartoli; Enrico San Pietro; Graziano Sassi; Andrea Baroni
- President: Maria Licia Ferrarini
- Head coach: Attilio Caja
- Arena: PalaBigi
- LBA: Regular season
- Europe Cup: Runners-up
- Supercup: Group stage (2nd of 3)

The 2020–21 season is Reggio Emilia's 48th in existence and the club's 11th consecutive season in the top tier Italian basketball.

== Kit ==
Supplier: Macron / Sponsor: UNAHOTELS

== Players ==
=== Current roster ===
UNAHOTELS Reggio Emilia roster
Players
Coaches

| Pos. | No. | Nat. | Name | Ht. | Wt. | Age |
|---|---|---|---|---|---|---|
| G | 1 | (Puerto Rico) | Thompson Jr., Stephen | 1.94 m (6 ft 4 in) | 88 kg (194 lb) | 29 – 23 March 1997 |
| F/C | 5 | (Hungary) | Hopkins, Mikael | 2.06 m (6 ft 9 in) | 105 kg (231 lb) | 33 – 23 June 1993 |
| PG | 7 | (Italy) | Candi, Leonardo (C) | 1.90 m (6 ft 3 in) | 86 kg (190 lb) | 29 – 30 March 1997 |
| PF | 8 | (Italy) | Baldi Rossi, Filippo | 2.07 m (6 ft 9 in) | 97 kg (214 lb) | 34 – 26 October 1991 |
| G/F | 12 | (Latvia) | Strautiņš, Artūrs | 1.98 m (6 ft 6 in) | 100 kg (220 lb) | 27 – 23 October 1998 |
| PG | 13 | (United States) | Crawford, Bryant | 1.91 m (6 ft 3 in) | 85 kg (187 lb) | 29 – 21 March 1997 |
| PG | 20 | (Italy) | Cinciarini, Andrea | 1.93 m (6 ft 4 in) | 85 kg (187 lb) | 40 – 21 June 1986 |
| PF | 23 | (United States) | Johnson, Justin | 2.00 m (6 ft 7 in) | 108 kg (238 lb) | 30 – 23 May 1996 |
| F | 31 | (Lithuania) | Olisevičius, Osvaldas | 1.98 m (6 ft 6 in) | 90 kg (198 lb) | 33 – 10 January 1993 |
| PF | 35 | (Italy) | Diouf, Mouhamet | 2.06 m (6 ft 9 in) | 105 kg (231 lb) | 25 – 10 September 2001 |
| G | 55 | (United States) | Larson, Tyler | 1.90 m (6 ft 3 in) | 86 kg (190 lb) | 34 – 31 December 1991 |

Head coach

- (Italy) Attilio Caja

Assistant coach(es)

- (Italy) Federico Fucà
- (Italy) Francesco Taccetti

Legend

- (C) Team captain
- Injured

- Roster
Updated: February 28, 2022

Note: Flags indicate national team eligibility at FIBA-sanctioned events. Players may hold other non-FIBA nationalities not displayed.

=== Depth chart ===
| Pos. | Starting 5 | Bench 1 | Bench 2 |
|---|---|---|---|
| C | Mikael Hopkins | Mouhamet Diouf |
| PF | Justin Johnson | Filippo Baldi Rossi |
| SF | Osvaldas Olisevičius | Artūrs Strautiņš |
| SG | Stephen Thompson Jr. | Leonardo Candi | Federico Bonacini |
| PG | Andrea Cinciarini | Bryant Crawford | Tyler Larson |

(colours: Italian or homegrown players; foreign players; young players)

=== Squad changes ===
==== In ====
| No. | Pos. | Nat. | Name | Age | Moving from | | Type | Ends | Transfer fee | Date | Source |
|---|---|---|---|---|---|---|---|---|---|---|---|
| 12 | SF | (Latvia) | Artūrs Strautiņš | 22 | Pallacanestro Varese | (Italy) | 1+1 years | June 2022 + 2023 | Free | 4 July 2021 | |
| 31 | F | (Lithuania) | Osvaldas Olisevičius | 28 | Medi Bayreuth | (Germany) | 1 year | June 2022 | Free | 10 July 2021 | |
| 13 | PG | (United States) | Bryant Crawford | 24 | Juventus Utena | (Lithuania) | 2 year | June 2023 (opt. 2022) | Free | 11 July 2021 | |
| 1 | G | (United States) | Stephen Thompson Jr. | 24 | Stella Azzurra Roma | (Italy) | 2 years (opt. 2022) | June 2023 | Free | 16 July 2021 | |
| 5 | F/C | (United States) | Mikael Hopkins | 28 | Cedevita Olimpija | (Slovenia) | 1 year | June 2022 | Free | 1 August 2021 | |
| 20 | PG | (Italy) | Andrea Cinciarini | 35 | Olimpia Milano | (Italy) | 3 years | June 2024 | Undisclosed | 10 August 2021 | |
| | G | (United States) | Tyler Larson | 30 | VL Pesaro | (Italy) | 4 months | June 2022 | Undisclosed | 28 February 2022 | |

1. In players: Players who signed after the beginning of the season

==== Out ====
| No. | Pos. | Nat. | Name | Age | Moving to | | Type | Transfer fee | Date | Source |
|---|---|---|---|---|---|---|---|---|---|---|
| 77 | SG | (Czech Republic) | Tomáš Kyzlink | 27 | USK Praha | (Czech Republic) | Exit option | Undisclosed | 25 May 2021 | |
| 0 | SG | (United States) (Jamaica) | Brynton Lemar | 26 | Enisey Krasnoyarsk | (Russia) | End of contract | Free | 1 July 2021 | |
| 3 | SG | (Finland) | Petteri Koponen | 33 | Helsinki Seagulls | (Finland) | End of contract | Free | 1 July 2021 | |
| 11 | F | (United States) | Brandon Taylor | 27 | BCM Gravelines-Dunkerque | (France) | End of contract | Free | 1 July 2021 | |
| 14 | G | (Italy) | Marco Giannini | 19 | Lions Bisceglie | (Italy) | End of contract | Free | 1 July 2021 | |
| 15 | C | (United States Virgin Islands) (Guyana) | Frank Elegar | 35 | Napoli Basket | (Italy) | End of contract | Free | 1 July 2021 | |

==== Confirmed ====
| No. | Pos. | Nat. | Name | Age | Moving from | | Type | Ends | Transfer fee | Date | Source |
|---|---|---|---|---|---|---|---|---|---|---|---|
| 7 | PG | (Italy) | Leonardo Candi | 24 | Fortitudo Bologna | (Italy) | 5 year | June 2022 | Free | 22 June 2017 | |
| 35 | PF | (Italy) | Mouhamet Diouf | 19 | youth team | | | June 2023 | Youth system | September 2019 | |
| 32 | G | (Italy) | Federico Bonacini | 22 | Pallacanestro Trapani | (Italy) | Return from loan | | Free | 1 July 2020 | |
| 8 | PF | (Italy) | Filippo Baldi Rossi | 29 | Virtus Bologna | (Italy) | 2 years | June 2022 | Undisclosed | 16 July 2020 | |
| 23 | PF | (United States) | Justin Johnson | 24 | Pistoia Basket 2000 | (Italy) | 1 + 2 years (opt. out 2022) | June 2023 | Free | 19 August 2020 | |
| 16 | C | (The Gambia) | Ibrahima Cham | 17 | youth team | | | | Youth system | September 2020 | |

==== Coach ====
Coach Maurizio Buscaglia was replaced by Antimo Martino but his contract was valid until he was called by Brescia for the role of head coach.

| Nat. | Name | Age. | Previous team | | Type | Ends | Date | Source |
|---|---|---|---|---|---|---|---|---|
| (Italy) | Attilio Caja | 60 | Pallacanestro Varese | (Italy) | 2 years | June 2022 | 16 March 2021 | |

=== On loan ===
| Pos. | Nat. | Name | Age | Moving from | | Moving to | | Date | Contract | Ends |
|---|---|---|---|---|---|---|---|---|---|---|
| G | (Italy) | Alessandro Cipolla | 21 | Stella Azzurra Roma | (Italy) | Urania Milano | (Italy) | 20 July 2021 | 4 years | June 2024 |
| G | (Italy) | Carlo Porfilio | 20 | Reggio Emilia | (Italy) | Pallacanestro Biella | (Italy) | 28 July 2021 | | |
| PG | (Italy) | Jacopo Soviero | 20 | Bologna Basket 2016 | (Italy) | Pallacanestro Biella | (Italy) | 28 July 2021 | | |

== Competitions ==
=== Supercup ===
| Pos | Team | Pld | W | L | PF | PA | PD | Qualification |
|---|---|---|---|---|---|---|---|---|
| 1 | Umana Reyer Venezia | 4 | 4 | 0 | 329 | 281 | +48 | Advance to Final Eight |
| 2 | UnaHotels Reggio Emilia | 4 | 2 | 2 | 302 | 284 | +18 | |
| 3 | Fortitudo Bologna | 4 | 0 | 4 | 270 | 336 | −66 | |

Source: LegaBasket Serie A
Rules for classification: All points scored in extra period(s) were not counted in the standings, nor for any tie-break situation.

=== Serie A ===
| Pos | Team | Pld | W | L | PF | PA | PD | Pts | Qualification |
|---|---|---|---|---|---|---|---|---|---|
| 5 | Umana Reyer Venezia | 30 | 17 | 13 | 2331 | 2297 | +34 | 34 | Qualification to Playoffs |
| 6 | Banco di Sardegna Sassari | 30 | 17 | 13 | 2541 | 2449 | +92 | 34 | Qualification to Playoffs |
| 7 | UNAHOTELS Reggio Emilia | 30 | 15 | 15 | 2409 | 2401 | +8 | 30 | Qualification to Playoffs |
| 8 | Carpegna Prosciutto Pesaro | 30 | 14 | 16 | 2408 | 2518 | −110 | 28 | Qualification to Playoffs |
| 9 | Allianz Pallacanestro Trieste | 30 | 14 | 16 | 2390 | 2464 | −74 | 28 | |

Source: LBA

=== Europe Cup ===
==== Regular season ====
| Pos | Team | Pld | W | L | PF | PA | PD | Pts | Qualification |
|---|---|---|---|---|---|---|---|---|---|
| 1 | (Russia) Avtodor | 6 | 5 | 1 | 562 | 463 | +99 | 11 | Advance to second round |
| 2 | (Italy) Reggiana | 6 | 4 | 2 | 497 | 457 | +40 | 10 | Advance to second round |
| 3 | (Spain) Casademont Zaragoza | 6 | 2 | 4 | 484 | 515 | −31 | 8 | |
| 4 | (Israel) Hapoel Gilboa Galil | 6 | 1 | 5 | 443 | 551 | −108 | 7 | |

Source: Groups Standings

==== Second round ====
| Pos | Team | Pld | W | L | PF | PA | PD | Pts | Qualification |
|---|---|---|---|---|---|---|---|---|---|
| 1 | (Italy) Reggiana | 6 | 5 | 1 | 408 | 402 | +6 | 11 | Advance to Quarter Finals |
| 2 | (Germany) Hakro Merlins Crailsheim | 6 | 3 | 3 | 473 | 453 | +20 | 9 | Advance to Quarter Finals |
| 3 | (Belgium) Telenet Giants Antwerp | 6 | 2 | 4 | 493 | 475 | +18 | 8 | |
| 4 | (Ukraine) Kyiv-Basket | 6 | 2 | 4 | 374 | 418 | −44 | 7 | |

Source: Second Round Standings

==== Quarterfinals ====
| Team 1 | Agg. | Team 2 | 1st leg | 2nd leg |
|---|---|---|---|---|
| UnaHotels Reggio Emilia (Italy) | 151–143 | (Poland) Legia Warsaw | 71–68 | 80–75 |

==== Semifinals ====
| Team 1 | Agg. | Team 2 | 1st leg | 2nd leg |
|---|---|---|---|---|
| UnaHotels Reggio Emilia (Italy) | 164–146 | (Denmark) Bakken Bears | 72–74 | 92–72 |

==== Finals ====
| Team 1 | Agg. | Team 2 | 1st leg | 2nd leg |
|---|---|---|---|---|
| Bahçeşehir Koleji (Turkey) | – | (Italy) UnaHotels Reggio Emilia | 20 Apr | 27 Apr |
