= Richard Solomon (basketball) =

American basketball player (born 1992)

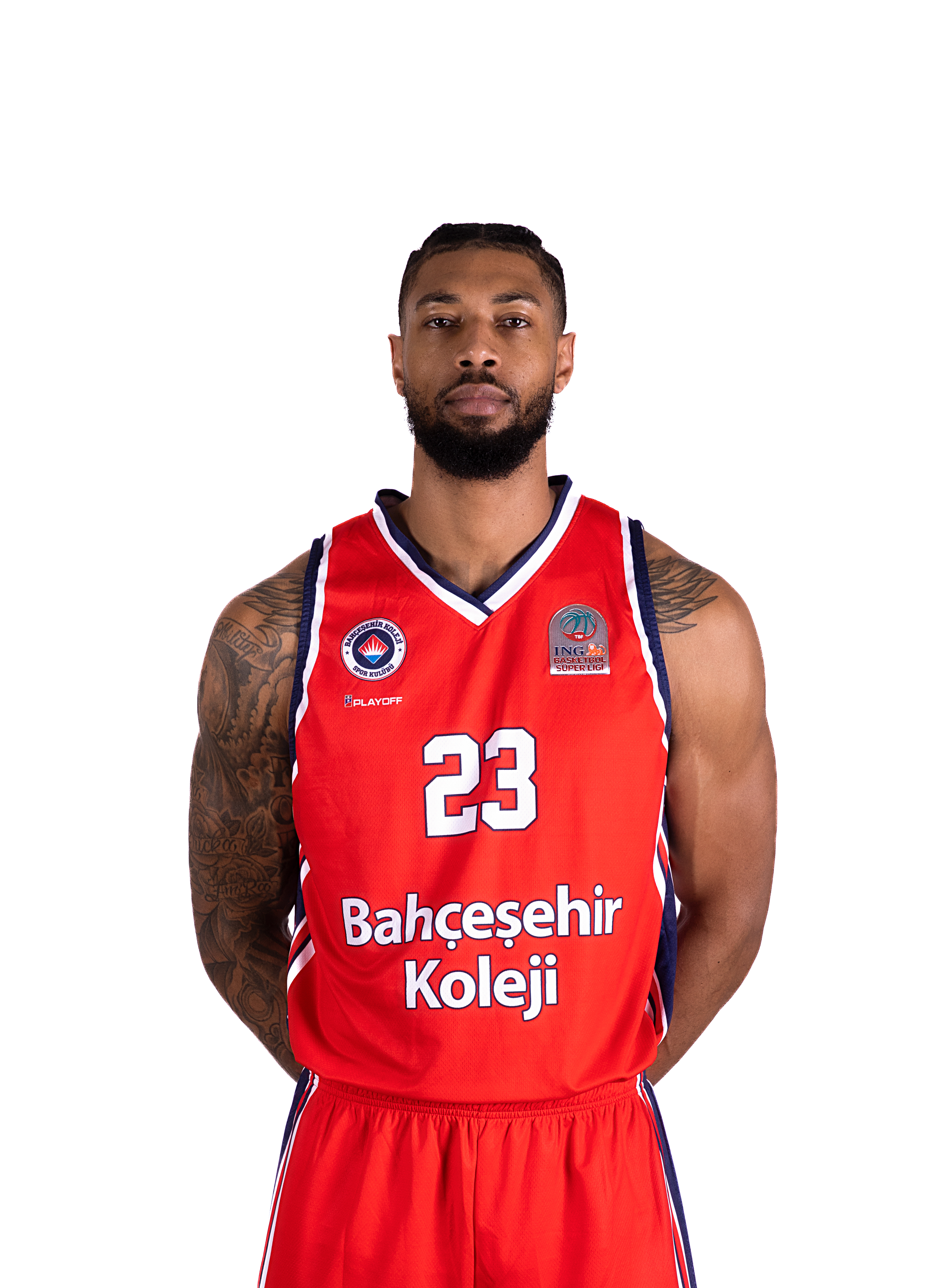
- Solomon with Bahçeşehir Koleji in 2021

No. 6 – Hong Kong Bulls
- Position: Power forward
- League: National Basketball League

Personal information
- Born: June 18, 1992 (age 34) Inglewood, California, U.S.
- Listed height: 6 ft 10 in (2.08 m)
- Listed weight: 238 lb (108 kg)

Career information
- High school: Bishop Montgomery (Torrance, California); Frederick K. C. Price (Los Angeles, California)
- College: California (2010–2014)
- NBA draft: 2014: undrafted
- Playing career: 2014–present

Career history
- 2014–2015: Oklahoma City Blue
- 2015–2016: Toyota Alvark Tokyo
- 2016–2017: BCM Gravelines-Dunkerque
- 2017–2018: Uşak Sportif
- 2018–2019: Oklahoma City Blue
- 2019–2020: JDA Dijon Basket
- 2020–2021: Toyama Grouses
- 2021–2022: Bahçeşehir Koleji
- 2022–2023: Zenit Saint Petersburg
- 2023: Çağdaş Bodrumspor
- 2023–2024: Parma Basket
- 2024–2025: Beijing Ducks
- 2025: Beirut Club
- 2025–2026: Nanjing Monkey Kings
- 2026–present: Hong Kong Bulls

Career highlights
- NBL champion (2026); FIBA Europe Cup champion (2022); French League Leaders Cup champion (2020)
- Stats at Basketball Reference

Richard Solomon III (born June 18, 1992) is an American professional basketball player for the Hong Kong Bulls of the Chinese National Basketball League (NBL). He played college basketball for the California Golden Bears.

== High school career ==
Solomon began in Bishop Montgomery High School, but transferred to Frederick K. C. Price High School, where he averaged 16.9 points, 9.0 rebounds and a team-best 3.0 blocks, making all-state and the All-CIF first team. When he graduated, he was listed No. 20 among power forwards, according to Rivals. com.

== College career ==
Solomon played his collegiate career for California, where he played in 109 games and averaged 8.1 points, 7.0 rebounds and 1.1 blocks in 22.5 minutes with a 51.2 percent shooting. His best season was as a senior, where he averaged 11 points, 10.2 rebounds and 1.3 blocks per contest.

== Professional career ==
=== Oklahoma City Blue (2014–2015) ===
After going undrafted in the 2014 NBA draft, Solomon signed with the Oklahoma City Thunder on September 29, 2014. However, on October 24, he was waived by the Thunder after three preseason games. On November 4, he signed with the Oklahoma City Blue of the NBA Development League. In 28 games, he averaged 8.5 points, 6.9 rebounds, 0.6 steals and 0.5 blocks.

=== Alvark Tokyo (2015–2016) ===
In July 2015, Solomon joined the Thunder for the 2015 NBA Summer League. On July 25, he signed with Toyota Alvark Tokyo of the Japanese National Basketball League. In 59 games, he averaged 11.3 points and 8.8 rebounds.

=== Gravelines-Dunkerque (2016–2017) ===
In July 2016, Solomon spent time with the Thunder and the Phoenix Suns on the 2016 NBA Summer League. On September 20, 2016, Solomon signed with the Atlanta Hawks, but was waived on October 1. Five days later, he signed with BCM Gravelines-Dunkerque of the French LNB Pro A.

=== Uşak Sportif (2017–2018) ===
On June 21, 2017, Solomon signed with Uşak Sportif of the Turkish Basketball Super League. In 19 games, Solomon averaged 9.6 points and 4.8 rebounds per game, shooting 58.7 percent from the floor.

=== Second stint with Oklahoma City Blue (2018–2019) ===
On September 23, 2018, Solomon signed with the Oklahoma City Thunder. On October 10, 2018, Solomon was waived by the Thunder. Solomon was added to the Oklahoma City Blue training camp roster on October 23, 2018.

On February 14, 2019, he signed a 10-day contract with the Oklahoma City Thunder,

Solomon was not offered a second 10-day contract after his first one expired thus returned to the Oklahoma City Blue.

=== JDA Dijon Basket (2019–2020) ===
On August 7, 2019, Solomon signed with JDA Dijon Basket of the LNB Pro A and the Basketball Champions League. He averaged 12 points and 5.9 rebounds per game.

=== Toyama Grouses (2020–2021) ===
On September 18, 2020, Solomon signed with the Toyama Grouses of the B.League. He averaged 17.1 points, 10.4 rebounds and 1.3 assists per game.

=== Bahçeşehir Koleji (2021–2022) ===
On October 21, 2021, Solomon signed with Bahçeşehir Koleji of the Turkish Basketball Super League (BSL).

=== Zenit Saint Petersburg (2022–2023) ===
On July 31, 2022, he has signed with Zenit Saint Petersburg of the VTB United League.

=== Çağdaş Bodrumspor (2023) ===
On March 3, 2023, he signed with Çağdaş Bodrumspor of the Turkish Basketball First League.

== Personal life ==
He is the son of Richard Jr. and Sheryl Solomon and has three older sisters.
