= Berkay Candan =

Turkish basketball player (born 1993)

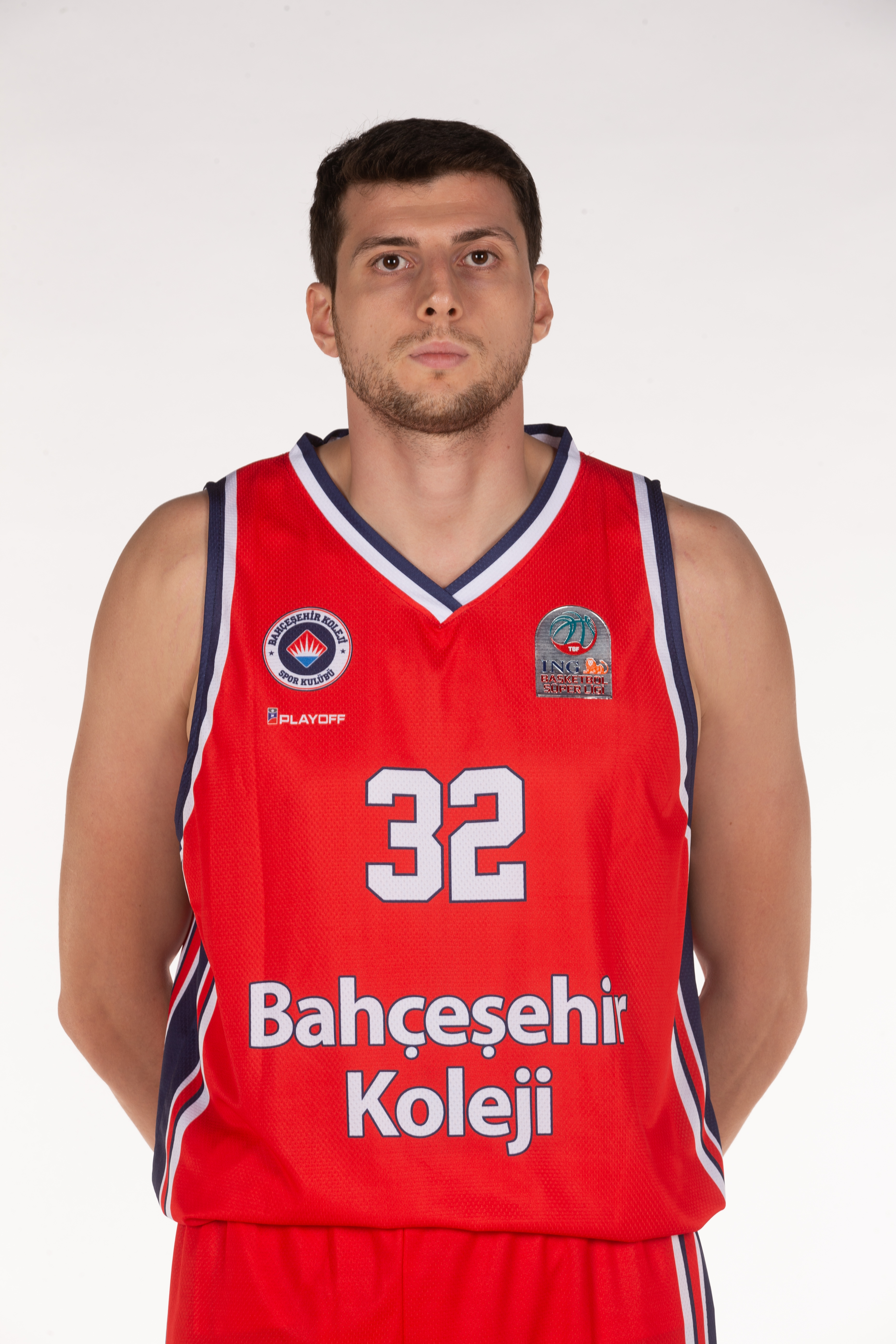

No. 32 – Çayırova Belediyespor
- Position: Power forward
- League: Basketbol Süper Ligi

Personal information
- Born: May 22, 1993 (age 33) Fatih, Istanbul, Turkey
- Listed height: 6 ft 9 in (2.06 m)
- Listed weight: 223 lb (101 kg)

Career information
- NBA draft: 2015: undrafted
- Playing career: 2009–present

Career history
- 2009–2015: Fenerbahçe
- 2012–2013: →Olin Edirne
- 2013–2014: →TED Ankara Kolejliler
- 2014–2015: →Banvit
- 2015–2016: Trabzonspor
- 2016–2017: Uşak Sportif
- 2017–2018: Eskişehir Basket
- 2018–2019: Büyükçekmece
- 2019–2021: Fenerbahçe
- 2021–2024: Bahçeşehir Koleji
- 2024–2025: Bursaspor
- 2025–present: Çayırova Belediyespor

Career highlights
- FIBA Europe Cup champion (2022); Turkish Cup winner (2020); Federation Cup winner (2026)
Medals
Men's basketball
Representing Turkey
FIBA Europe Under-18 Championship
Bronze medal – third place	2011 Wrocław	U-18 Team

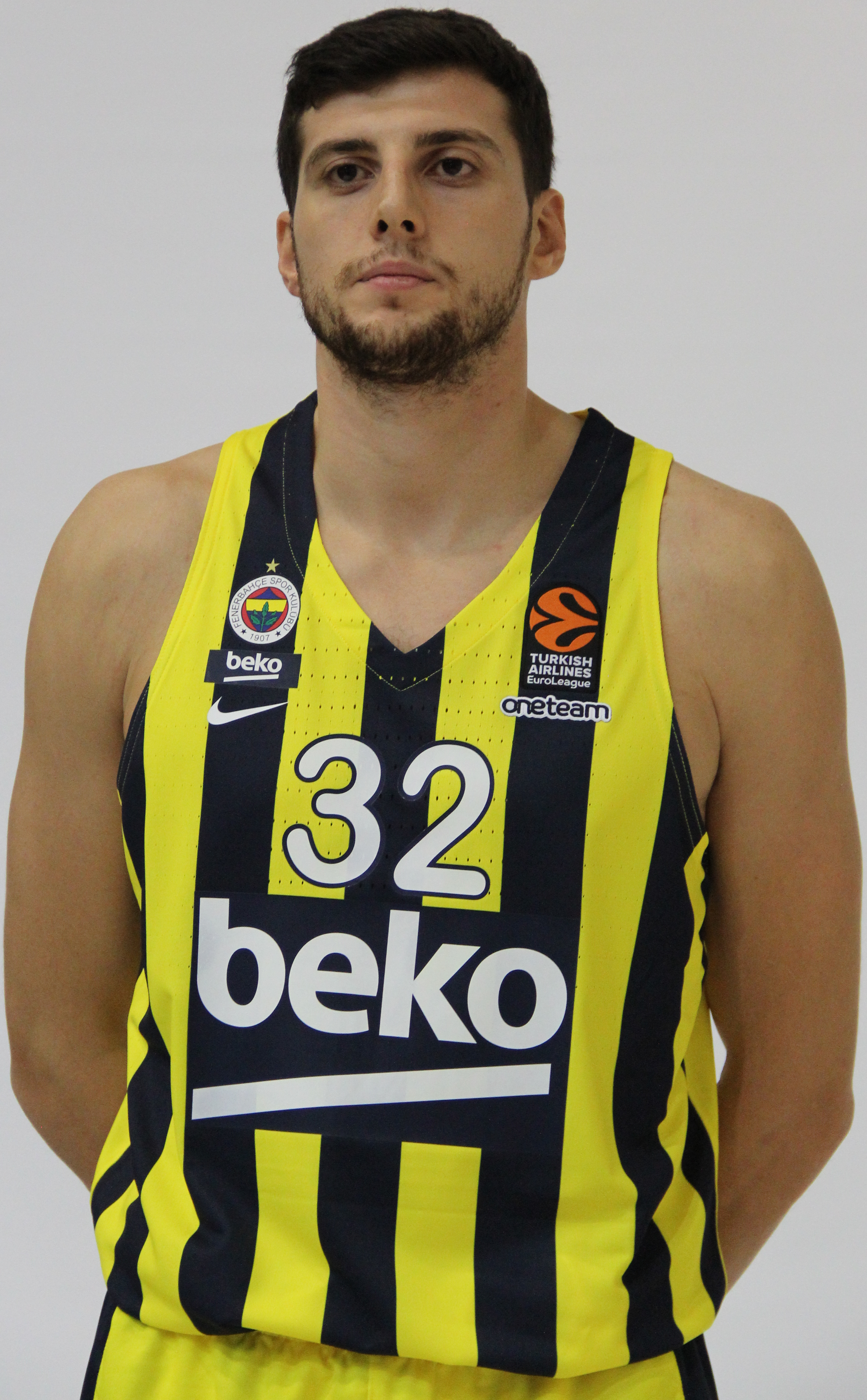
Berkay in 2019 with Fenerbahçe

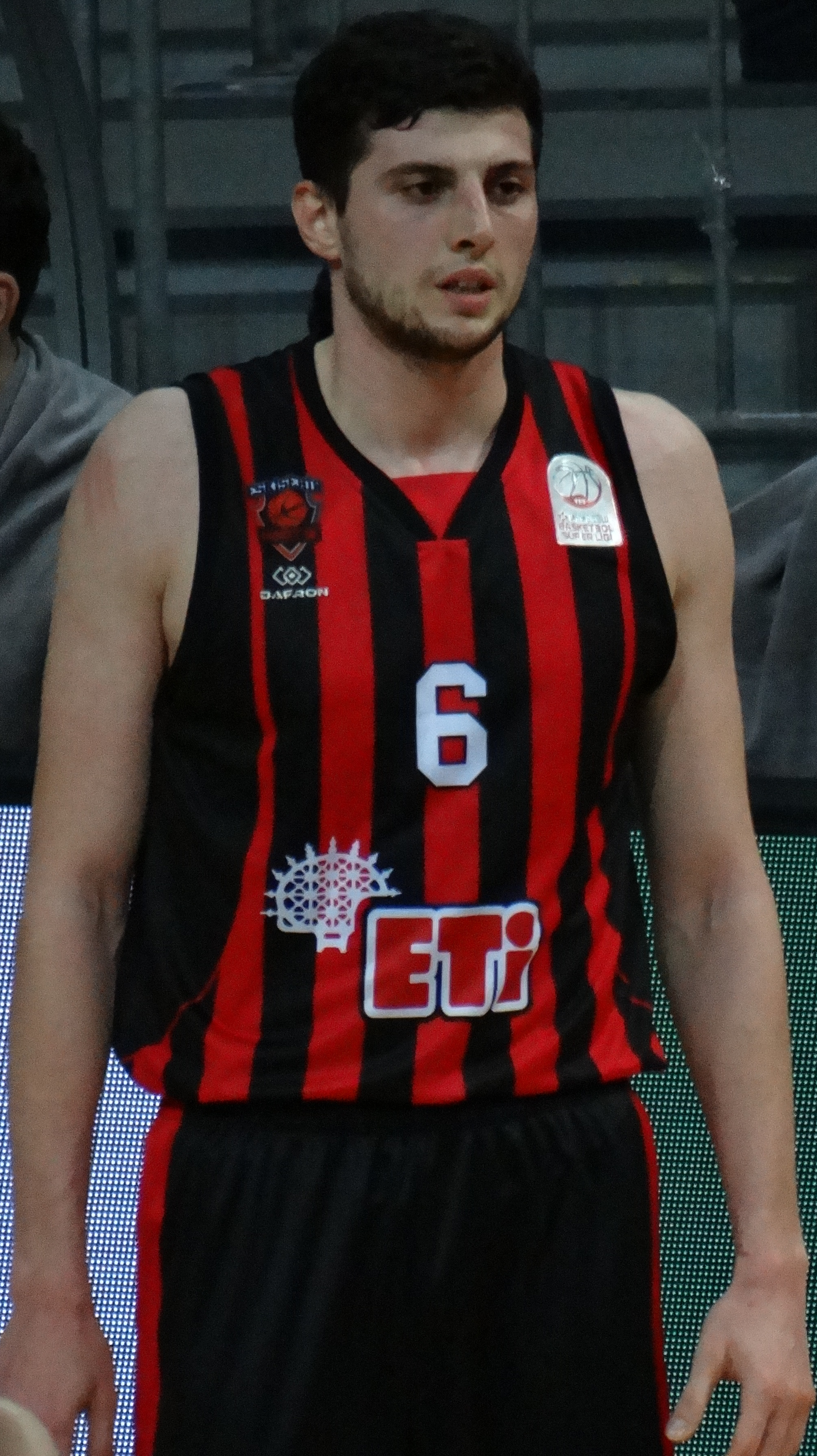
Berkay in 2018

Berkay Candan (born May 22, 1993) is a Turkish professional basketball player for Çayırova Belediyespor of the Basketbol Süper Ligi (BSL). He is 6 ft 9 in (2.06 m) tall and currently weighs 223 lb (101 kg).
