= Marko Barać =

Serbian basketball coach

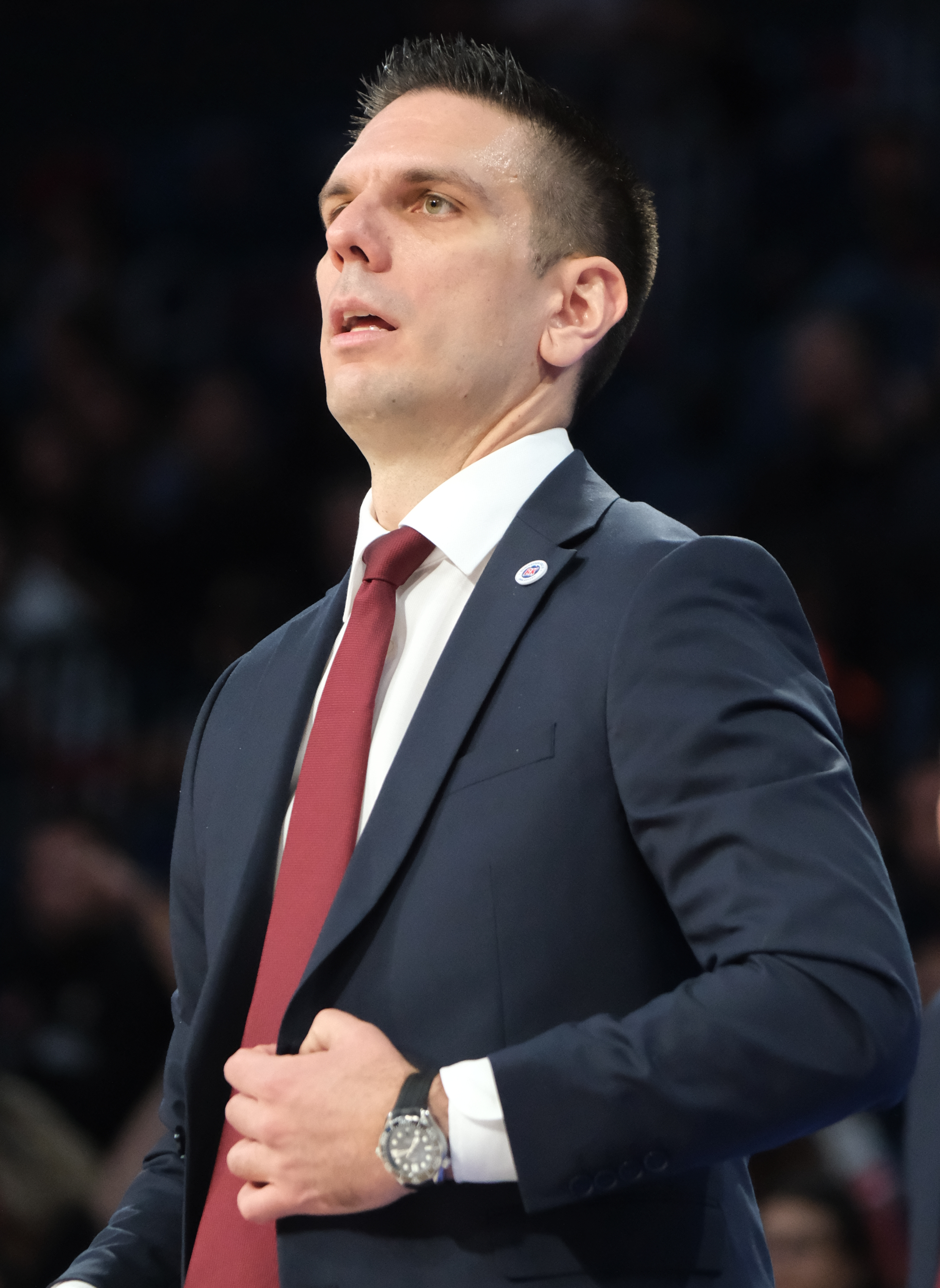
- Barać with Bahçeşehir Koleji in 2025

Personal information
- Born: 18 March 1989 (age 37) Belgrade, SR Serbia, Yugoslavia
- Position: Head coach
- Coaching career: 2009–present

Career history

Coaching
- 2013–2014: We're Basket Ortona
- 2014–2015: Czarni Słupsk (assistant)
- 2016–2018: Torlak
- 2018–2019: Mladost Zemun
- 2019–2022: Igokea (assistant)
- 2019, 2022: Igokea (interim)
- 2022–2025: Mega Basket
- 2025–2026: Bahçeşehir Koleji

Career highlights
- As assistant coach: 2× Bosnian League champion (2020, 2022); 2× Bosnian Cup winner (2021, 2022)
Medals
Men's basketball
Assistant coach for Serbia
U20 European Championship
Bronze medal – third place	2014 Greece	Team
U19 World Championship
Silver medal – second place	2013 Czech Republic	Team
U18 European Championship
Bronze medal – third place	2012 Lithuania/Latvia	Team

Marko Barać (Serbian Cyrillic: Марко Бараћ; born 18 March 1989) is a Serbian professional basketball coach who last worked as the head coach for Bahçeşehir Koleji of the Turkish Basketbol Süper Ligi (BSL).

== Coaching career ==
In 2009, Barać joined a youth system of Superfund as an assistant coach. In 2011, he joined the Crvena zvezda under-18 team as an assistant coach, as well. For the 2013–14, Barać was the head coach for We're Basket Ortona of the Italian 3rd-tier Serie B. Barać was an assistant coach for Energa Czarni Słupsk during the 2014–15 PLK season under Dejan Mijatović. Barać coached Belgrade-based team KK Torlak for two seasons, between 2016 and 2019. In the 2018–19 KLS season, Barać was head coach for Mladost Zemun.

In August 2019, Barać joined Bosnian team Igokea as an assistant coach. Occasionally, he was the interim head coach due to health issues of the Igokea head coaches Aleksandar Trifunović (October 2019) and Dragan Bajić (January 2022). He left Igokea in June 2022.

On 20 June 2022, Mega Basket hired Barać as their new head coach.

On 12 June 2025, Bahçeşehir Koleji hired Barać as their new head coach.

== National team coaching career ==
Between 2012 and 2014, Barać was an assistant coach for Serbian youth teams led by head coach Dejan Mijatović, winning three medals. In August 2012, he won a bronze medal with Serbia U18 at the FIBA Europe Under-18 Championship. With the Serbia under-19 team he won a silver medal at the 2013 FIBA Under-19 World Championship. In July 2014, Barać won a bronze medal with Serbia U20 at the FIBA Europe Under-20 Championship.

== Career achievements ==
As assistant coach

- Bosnian League champion: 2 (with Igokea: 2019–20, 2021–22)
- Bosnian Cup winner: 2 (with Igokea: 2020–21, 2021–22)
