= Jamal Jones (basketball) =

American basketball player (born 1993)

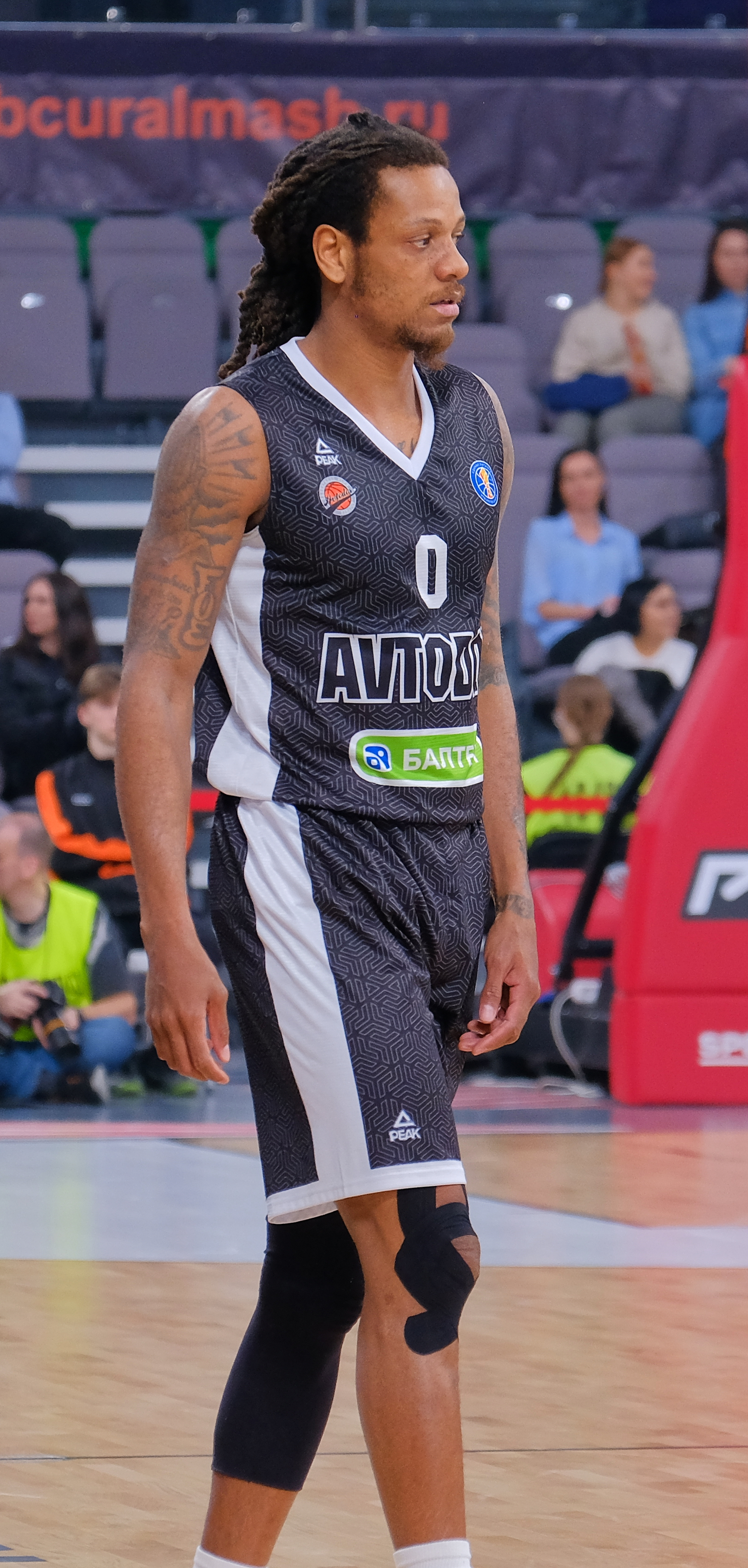
- Jones with Avtodor in 2024

No. 1 – Sagesse SC
- Position: Small forward / power forward
- League: Lebanese Basketball League

Personal information
- Born: February 17, 1993 (age 33) Wynne, Arkansas, U.S.
- Listed height: 6 ft 8 in (2.03 m)
- Listed weight: 200 lb (91 kg)

Career information
- High school: Searcy (Searcy, Arkansas)
- College: Ole Miss (2011–2012); Lee (2012–2013); Texas A&M (2013–2014)
- NBA draft: 2015: undrafted
- Playing career: 2014–present

Career history
- 2014–2015: Delaware 87ers
- 2015–2016: Lille Métropole
- 2016: Delaware 87ers
- 2016–2017: Kobrat
- 2017–2018: Scaligera Basket Verona
- 2018–2019: PAOK Thessaloniki
- 2019–2020: Ionikos Nikaias
- 2020–2022: Bahçeşehir Koleji
- 2022–2023: Dinamo Sassari
- 2023–2024: Promitheas Patras
- 2024: Homenetmen Beirut
- 2024–2025: Avtodor
- 2025–2026: Kuwait SC
- 2026–present: Sagesse SC

Career highlights
- FIBA Europe Cup champion (2022); Finnish League scoring champion (2017); Kuwait_SC champion (2025)1

Jamal Avery Jones (born February 17, 1993) is an American professional basketball player for Sagesse SC of the Lebanese Basketball League (LBL). He played college basketball for the Ole Miss Rebels and the Texas A&M Aggies.

== Early life ==
Jones was born in Wynne, Arkansas and grew up in Searcy, Arkansas, where he attended Searcy High School. After growing seven inches from 6–1 to 6–8 over three years, Jones averaged 16.4 points, seven rebounds, two assists and two steals as a junior and was ranked a three-star recruit by Rivals.com. He committed to Ole Miss over offers from Arkansas State and Iowa State during his senior year.

== College career ==
=== Ole Miss ===
Jones began his collegiate career at Ole Miss, but was dismissed from the team after appearing in only five games for violating undisclosed team rules.

=== Lee ===
Following his dismissal, Jones enrolled at Lee College in Baytown, Texas. He averaged 18 points and 5.3 rebounds in his only season with the Runnin' Rebels and ultimately committed to transfer to Texas A&M.

=== Texas A&M ===
Jones averaged a team-leading 13.4 points and 4.1 rebounds in 34 games (24 starts) in his junior season with the Aggies and averaged 16 points per game in Southeastern Conference play. Following the season he announced that he would be leaving the program.

== Professional career ==
=== Delaware 87ers (first stint) ===
After initially considering transferring for his final year of NCAA eligibility, Jones ultimately decided to end his collegiate career and move on to the NBA Development League. Jones was selected in the second round of the 2014 NBA Development League draft by the Delaware 87ers. In his first professional season, Jones averaged 7.8 points and 2.9 rebounds in 21.1 minutes in 46 games.

=== Lille Métropole ===
After going unselected in the 2015 NBA draft and a stint playing for the 76ers Summer League team, Jones ultimately decided to leave the 76ers organization for options overseas instead of a second D-League season. He signed with Lille Métropole of the French Second Division on August 3, 2015. he averaged 13.1 points, 4.9 rebounds, and 1.9 assists in 18 games before leaving the team to return to the 87ers.

=== Delaware 87ers (second stint) ===
Jones returned to the 87ers and finished the 2016 season with the team, playing in 13 games (one start) and averaging 5.4 points and 1.6 rebounds per game. He was selected by the Windy City Bulls in the 10th round of the 2016 NBA Development League Expansion draft, but opted again to play overseas instead of in the D-League. Windy City traded his overseas return rights to the Northern Arizona Suns on October 29, 2016.

=== Kobrat ===
Jones signed with Kobrat of the Finnish Korisliiga on August 11, 2016. He led the league in scoring by averaging 21.5 points per game along 5.6 rebounds, 1.8 assists and 1.2 steals in 39 contests.

=== Scaligera Basket Verona ===
Jones signed with Scaligera Basket Verona of Serie A2 Basket on July 9, 2017. He averaged 14 points, 4.2 rebounds, and 2.2 assists per game in 36 games with the team.

=== PAOK ===
Jones signed with PAOK of the Greek Basket League (GBL) on July 4, 2018. He suffered damage to the cartilage in his right knee early March, 2019 that required season-ending surgery. He averaged 6.5 points in 12 Basketball Champions League games and 7.7 points with 3.1 rebounds in 13 GBL games.

=== Ionikos Nikaias ===
Jones opted to stay in Greece for the 2019–2020 season and signed with Ionikos Nikaias on June 25, 2019. Jones averaged 13.7 points, 5.2 rebounds and 2.1 assists in 15 games played before leaving the team in January 2020.

=== Bahçeşehir Koleji ===
On January 16, 2020, Jones officially signed with Turkish club Bahçeşehir Koleji. He averaged 8.1 points, 4.4 rebounds and 2.1 assists in seven Turkish League games and 13.8 points, 6.4 rebounds, 2.6 assists and 1.0 blocks per game in five Europe Cup games. Jones re-signed with Bahçeşehir for the 2020–21 season.

=== Dinamo Sassari ===
On June 19, 2022, he signed with Dinamo Sassari of the Italian Lega Basket Serie A (LBA).

=== Promitheas Patras ===
On August 31, 2023, Jones returned to Greece, signing with Promitheas Patras. However, due to a family matter overseas, he was unable to join the club and was replaced by Cameron Reynolds. On December 3, 2023, his transfer finally came to fruition and he replaced Artūrs Kurucs. On March 15, 2024, Jones was released from the Greek club. He averaged 4.7 points per game in domestic competition and 7.8 points per game in the Basketball Champions League.
