= Muhammed Baygül =

Turkish basketball player

Muhammed Mustafa Baygül
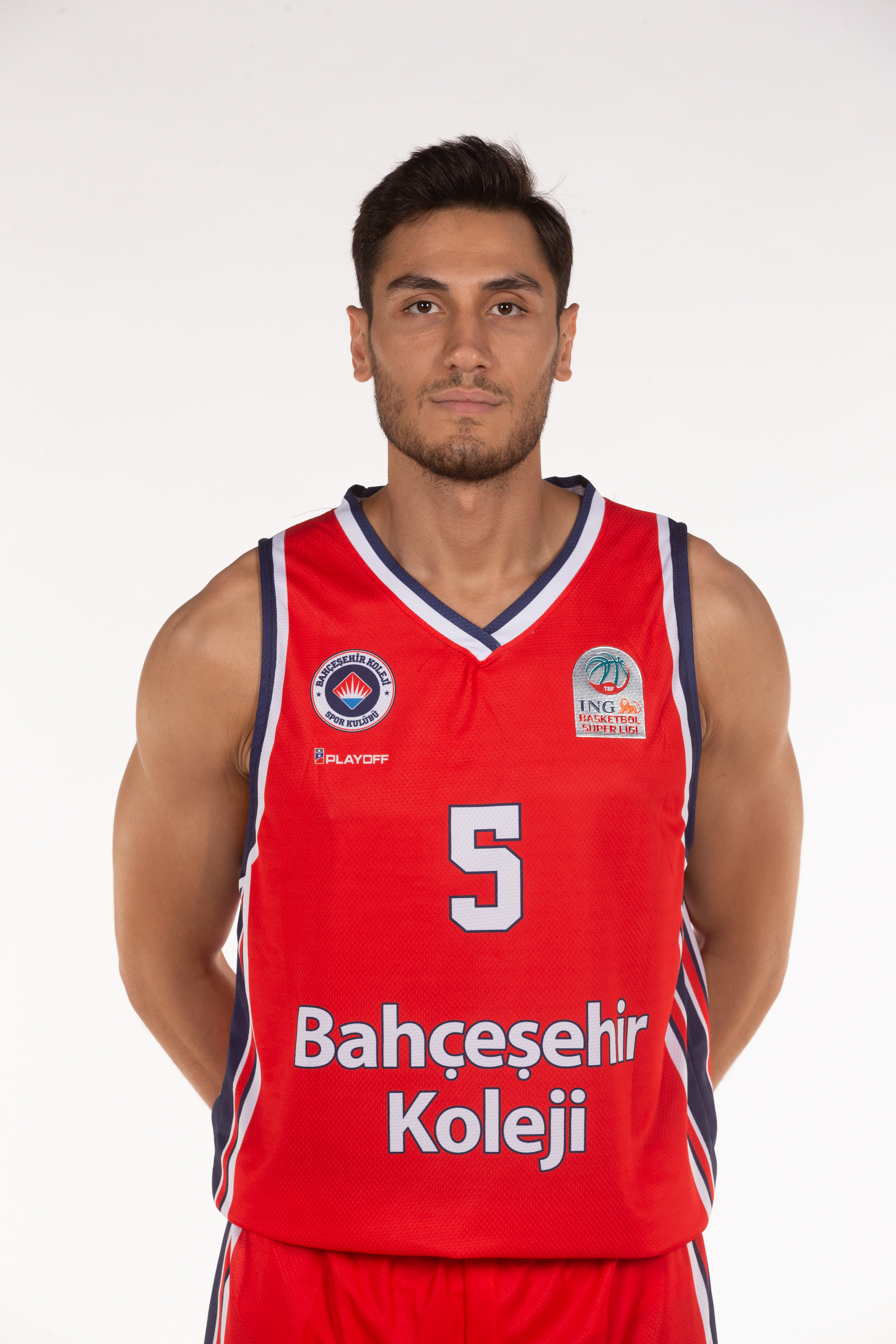

Free Agent
- Position: Shooting guard

Personal information
- Born: 3 June 1992 (age 34) Çankaya, Turkey
- Listed height: 6 ft 3 in (1.91 m)
- Listed weight: 186 lb (84 kg)

Career information
- NBA draft: 2014: undrafted
- Playing career: 2010–present

Career history
- 2010–2011: Galatasaray
- 2011–2012: Darüşşafaka
- 2012–2013: Hacettepe
- 2013–2015: TED Ankara Kolejliler
- 2015–2017: Pınar Karşıyaka
- 2017–2019: Darüşşafaka
- 2019–2021: Türk Telekom
- 2021–2024: Bahçeşehir Koleji
- 2024–2025: Ankaragücü Basketbol
- 2025–2026: Bandırma Bordo Basketbol

Career highlights
- FIBA Europe Cup champion (2022); EuroCup champion (2018)

Muhammed Mustafa Baygül (born 3 June 1992) is a Turkish professional basketball player. He is 1.91 m tall and plays at guard.

== Professional career ==
On 29 July 2015 he signed with Pınar Karşıyaka of the Basketbol Süper Ligi.

On 5 July 2017 he signed with Darüşşafaka of the Basketbol Süper Ligi.

On 1 August 2019 he signed with Türk Telekom of the Basketbol Süper Ligi. He averaged 10.7 points and 2.9 assists per game during the 2019–20 season. On 21 June 2020 Türk Telekom re-signed Baygül.

On 10 July 2021 he signed with Bahçeşehir Koleji of the Turkish Basketbol Süper Ligi (BSL).

On September 19, 2024, he signed with Ankaragücü Basketbol of the Türkiye Basketbol Ligi (TBL).
