= Kartal Özmızrak =

Turkish basketball player (born 1995)

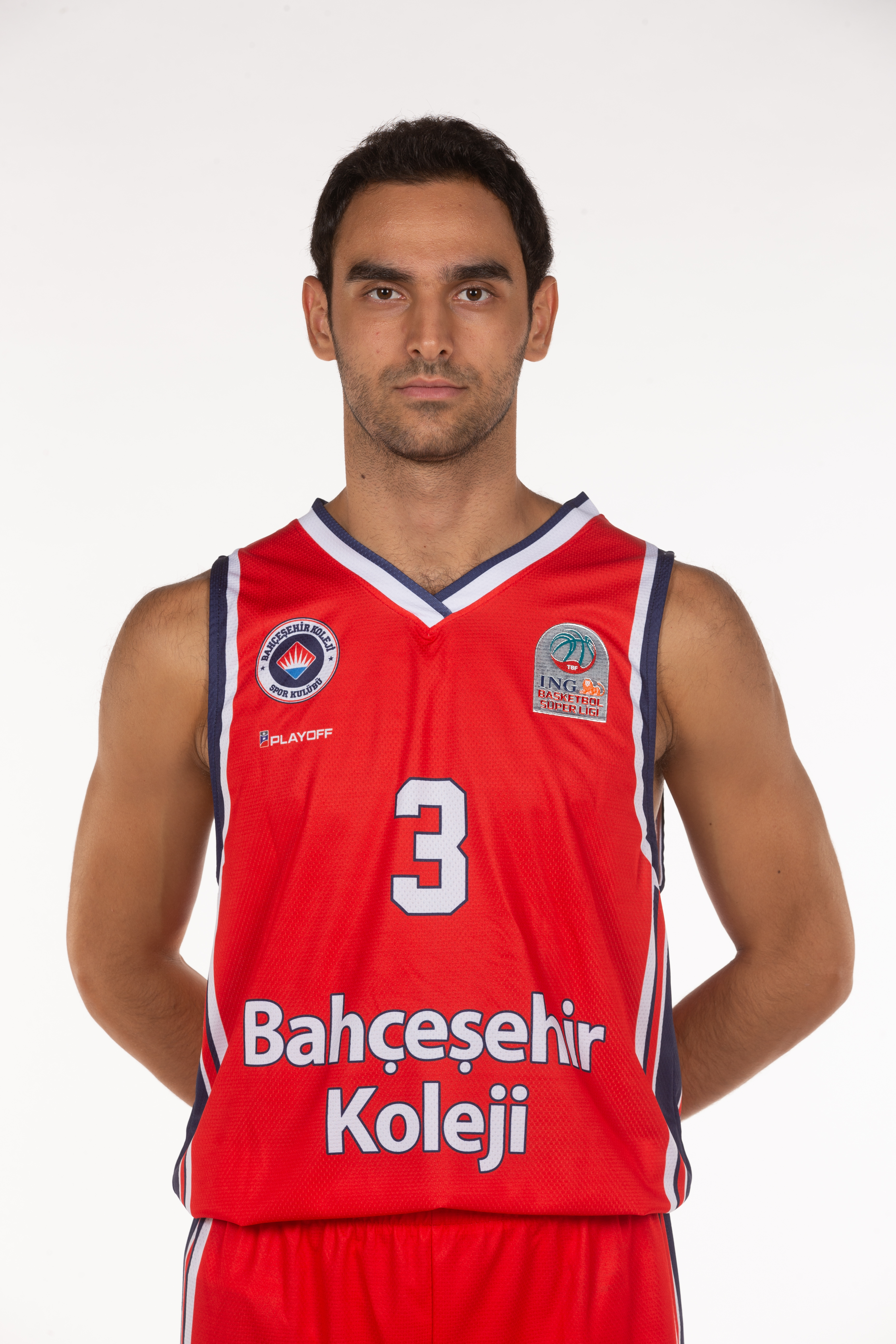
- Özmızrak with Bahçeşehir Koleji in 2021

No. 3 – Çayırova Belediyespor
- Position: Point guard
- League: Basketbol Süper Ligi

Personal information
- Born: 29 August 1995 (age 31) Bakırköy, Istanbul, Turkey
- Listed height: 6 ft 2 in (1.88 m)
- Listed weight: 163 lb (74 kg)

Career information
- NBA draft: 2017: undrafted
- Playing career: 2011–present

Career history
- 2011–2015: Beşiktaş
- 2014–2015: →Eskişehir Basket
- 2015–2020: Darüşşafaka
- 2015–2017: →İstanbul BB
- 2020–2021: Obradoiro
- 2021–2024: Bahçeşehir Koleji
- 2024–2026: Mersin MSK
- 2026–present: Çayırova Belediyespor

Career highlights
- FIBA Europe Cup champion (2022); EuroCup champion (2018); EuroChallenge champion (2012); Turkish BSL champion (2012); Turkish Cup winner (2012); Turkish President's Cup winner (2012)
Medals
Men's basketball
Representing Turkey
FIBA Europe Under-20 Championship
Gold medal – first place	2014 Greece	U-20 Team
Bronze medal – third place	2015 Italy	U-20 Team
FIBA Europe Under-18 Championship
Gold medal – first place	2013 Latvia	U-18 Team

Kartal Özmızrak (born 29 August 1995) is a Turkish professional basketball player for Çayırova Belediyespor of the Basketbol Süper Ligi (BSL).

== Professional career ==
Kartal was a product of Beşiktaş youth system and he also played there between 2011 and 2015. During this period, he has been loaned to Eskişehir Basket for 2014–15 season.

On 8 December 2015 he signed with Darüşşafaka and then loaned to İstanbul BB for two seasons.

On 6 July 2020 he signed with Obradoiro of the Liga ACB.

On 6 July 2021 he signed with Bahçeşehir Koleji of the Turkish Basketbol Süper Ligi (BSL).

On August 18, 2024, he signed with Mersin MSK of the Basketbol Süper Ligi (BSL).
