= Stevie Thompson =

American basketball player (born 1997)

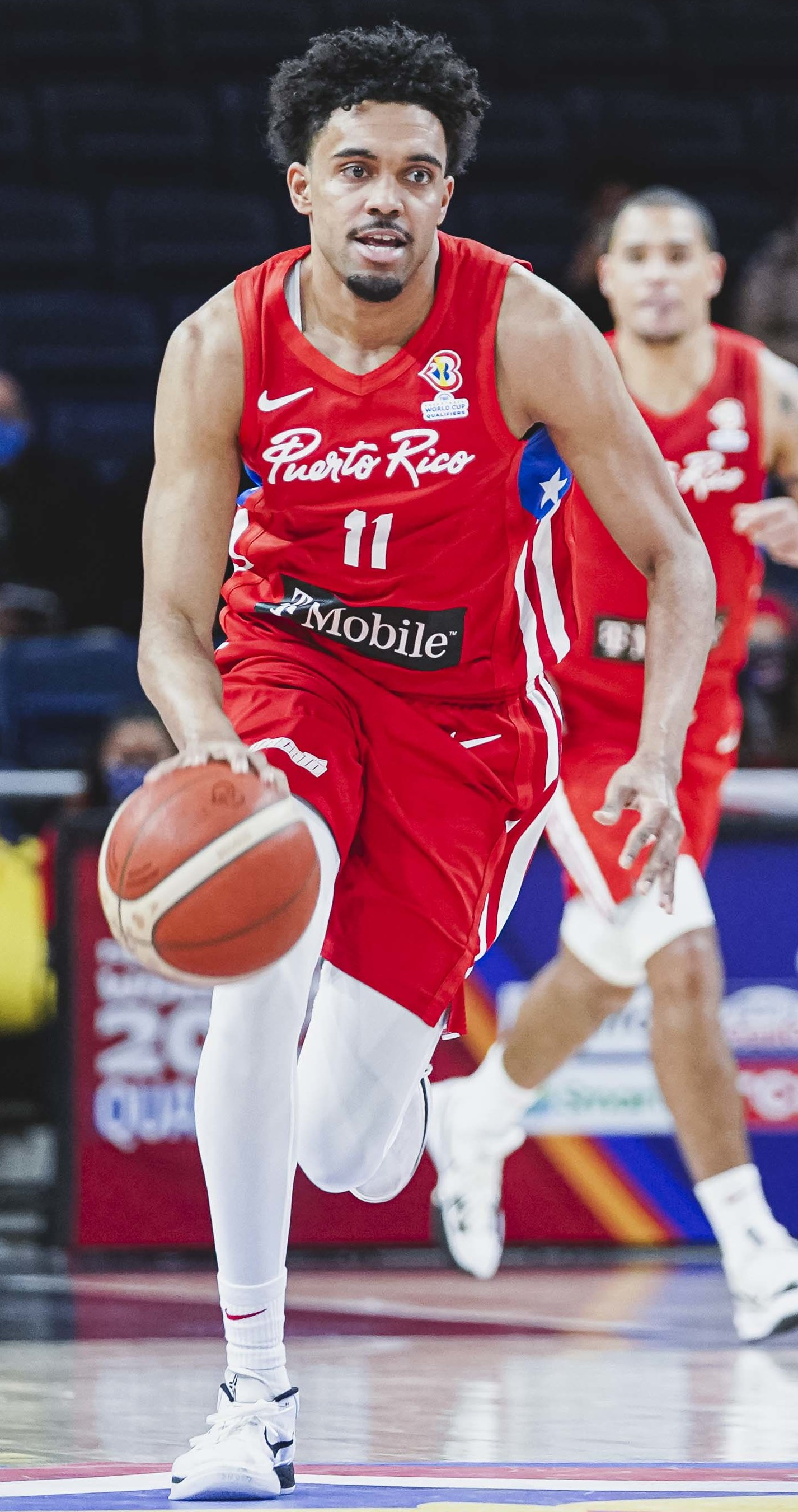
- Thompson with Puerto Rico during the qualifiers for the 2023 FIBA Basketball World Cup

No. 11 – Iowa Wolves
- Position: Shooting guard / point guard
- League: NBA G League

Personal information
- Born: March 23, 1997 (age 29) Harbor City, California, U.S.
- Listed height: 6 ft 4 in (1.93 m)
- Listed weight: 190 lb (86 kg)

Career information
- High school: Bishop Montgomery (Torrance, California)
- College: Oregon State (2015–2019)
- NBA draft: 2019: undrafted
- Playing career: 2019–present

Career history
- 2019–2020: Wisconsin Herd
- 2020: Erie BayHawks
- 2020–2021: Stella Azzurra Roma
- 2021–2022: Reggiana
- 2021–2022: Vaqueros de Bayamón
- 2022–2023: Bnei Herzliya
- 2023–2026: Vaqueros de Bayamón
- 2023–2026: Wisconsin Herd
- 2026–present: Iowa Wolves

Career highlights
- 3x BSN champion (2022, 2025, 2026); Second-team All-Pac-12 (2019)
- Stats at Basketball Reference

Stephen Mark Thompson Jr., (born March 23, 1997) nicknamed "Stevie", is an American-Puerto Rican professional basketball player for the Iowa Wolves of the NBA G League. He played college basketball for the Oregon State Beavers.

== Early life and high school ==
He was born in Harbor City, California, to Stephen and Amy Thompson.

He played basketball at Bishop Montgomery High School in Torrance, California (2015). He was named CIF Southern Section Division IV High School Player of the Year by the John R. Wooden Award Committee. He set school records for career points (2,246), season points (803), season scoring average (24.4), and career wins (114). As a senior, he averaged 24.4 points, 4.8 rebounds, 5.2 assists, and 2.6 steals. As a junior he was named First Team All-State. He was named First Team All-Del Rey League as a sophomore, junior and senior. He graduated with a 4.33 GPA.

== College career ==
He played college basketball for the Oregon State Beavers, and declared for the 2017 NBA draft.

As a freshman he averaged 10.6 points, 1.9 rebounds, 0.8 assists, and 1.2 steals per game. As a sophomore he averaged 16.3 points (6th in the Pac-12), 4.3 rebounds, 3.0 assists, and 1.4 steals (7th) per game. He was named to the Pac-12 All-Academic First Team.

As a junior he averaged 15.8 points (10th), 3.1 rebounds, 3.3 assists, and 1.7 steals (3rd) per game. He was named to the National Association of Basketball Coaches (NABC) Honors Court, the CoSIDA Academic All-District 8 First Team, and the Pac-12 All-Academic First Team. As a senior he averaged 16.1 points (9th), 4.2 rebounds, 3.2 assists, and 1.5 steals (5th) per game. He was named to the All-Pac-12 Second Team, the NABC All-District 20 Second Team, named the Pac-12 Scholar-Athlete of the Year, and named to the CoSIDA Academic All-District 8 First Team and the Pac-12 All-Academic First Team. Finished his Oregon State career fourth all-time in scoring (1,767), first in 3-pointers made (230), and tied for eighth in steals (177).

He earned his Oregon State bachelor’s degree in Digital Communication Arts in three years. He then pursued a master’s degree in Interdisciplinary Studies with a focus in Speech Communication and Sociology.

== Professional career ==
=== Wisconsin Herd (2019–2020) ===
On October 28, 2019, Thompson was named to the training camp roster of the Wisconsin Herd of the NBA G League. He played in three games for the team.

=== Erie Bayhawks (2020) ===
On February 4, 2020, Thompson was signed by the Erie BayHawks of the G League. He played in one game for the team. Thompson was waived by the BayHawks on February 14.

=== Stella Azzurra Roma (2020–2021) ===
Thompson signed with Stella Azzurra Roma of the Serie A2 Basket on August 1, 2020. In 2020–21 he averaged 21.4 points (3rd in the league), 5.4 rebounds, and 2.1 steals (leading the league) per game.

=== Reggio Emilia (2021–2022) ===
On July 16, 2021, Thompson signed in the highest Italian competition, in the Serie A and the Fiba Europe Cup for Reggio Emilia a two years contract with exit option in 2022.

=== Bnei Herzelia (2022–2023) ===
On November 23, 2022, Thompson signed with Bnei Herzliya of the Israeli Basketball Premier League and European Basketball Champions League.

=== Return to Wisconsin (2023–2024) ===
On October 30, 2023, Thompson rejoined the Wisconsin Herd.

=== Return to Bayamón (2024) ===
On March 22, 2024, Thompson re-signed with the Vaqueros de Bayamón, returning in April, after the G League season concluded.

=== Third stint with Wisconsin (2024–2025) ===
On October 28, 2024, Thompson rejoined the Wisconsin Herd.

=== Third stint with Vaqueros de Bayamón (2025) ===
Thompson returned to Bayamón for the 2025 season. On August 12, 2025, he helped the Vaqueros win their 17th championship.

As the Baloncesto Superior Nacional (BSN) season runs from March until July, Thompson can play in the NBA G League and the BSN both in their respective seasons.

=== Fourth stint with Wisconsin (2025–2026) ===
On October 15, 2025, Thompson Jr. signed a contract with the Milwaukee Bucks. However, two days later he was waived by the Bucks and returned to their NBA G League affiliate, the Wisconsin Herd. On November 7, Thompson was named to the Herd's opening night roster. On January 9, 2026, Thompson recorded 32 points and a career-high 11 assists in a 121-112 loss to the Long Island Nets; in the game, he also became the Herd's all-time leading scorer.

=== Fourth stint with the Vaqueros de Bayamón (2026) ===
On April 11, 2026, Thompson made his season debut, scoring 7 points and 5 rebounds. On May 10, 2026, he was selected as a BSN All-Star Game reserve.

In the conference semifinals against the Criollos de Caguas Thompson struggled throughout much of the series but delivered a standout performance in Game 5, recording 37 points, 4 rebounds, and 4 assists to lead his team to a dominant 122–77 victory. On August 23, 2026, Thompson helped the Vaqueros de Bayamón capture their second consecutive BSN championship, earning his third BSN title.

=== Iowa Wolves (2026–present) ===
On September 18, 2026, Thompson signed a training camp contract with the Minnesota Timberwolves. Two days later, Thompson was waived by the Timberwolves. On September 23, Thompson was traded from the Wisconsin Herd in exchange for the 16th overall pick in the 2026 NBA G League draft and the returning player rights to Jaylen Sims and Skylar Mays.

== FIBA senior team competitions ==
Thompson played in the 2021 Americas World Cup Qualifier, and the 2022 FIBA AmeriCup. He also competed in the 2023 FIBA World Cup in Manila representing Puerto Rico.

Stephen Thompson Jr. also represented Puerto Rico and competed in the Summer Olympics in Paris 2024.

== Career statistics ==
Legend
GP	Games played	GS	Games started	MPG	Minutes per game
FG%	Field goal percentage	3P%	3-point field goal percentage	FT%	Free throw percentage
RPG	Rebounds per game	APG	Assists per game	SPG	Steals per game
BPG	Blocks per game	PPG	Points per game	**Bold**	Career high

=== College ===
Year	Team	GP	GS	MPG	FG%	3P%	FT%	RPG	APG	SPG	BPG	PPG
2015–16	Oregon State	**32**	5	21.7	.405	**.375**	.691	1.9	.8	1.2	**.3**	10.6
2016–17	Oregon State	26	26	36.2	.397	.341	.634	**4.3**	3.0	1.4	.2	**16.3**
2017–18	Oregon State	**32**	**32**	**36.6**	**.461**	.348	.657	3.1	**3.3**	**1.7**	**.3**	15.8
2018–19	Oregon State	31	31	**36.6**	.428	.308	**.755**	4.2	3.2	1.5	.2	16.1
Career		121	94	32.6	.425	.340	.681	3.3	2.6	1.5	.3	14.6

== Personal life ==
He is the son of former NBA player Stephen Thompson and Amy Thompson. His brother, Ethan, also played for the Oregon State Beavers men's basketball team.
