= Andrea Cinciarini =

Italian professional basketball player

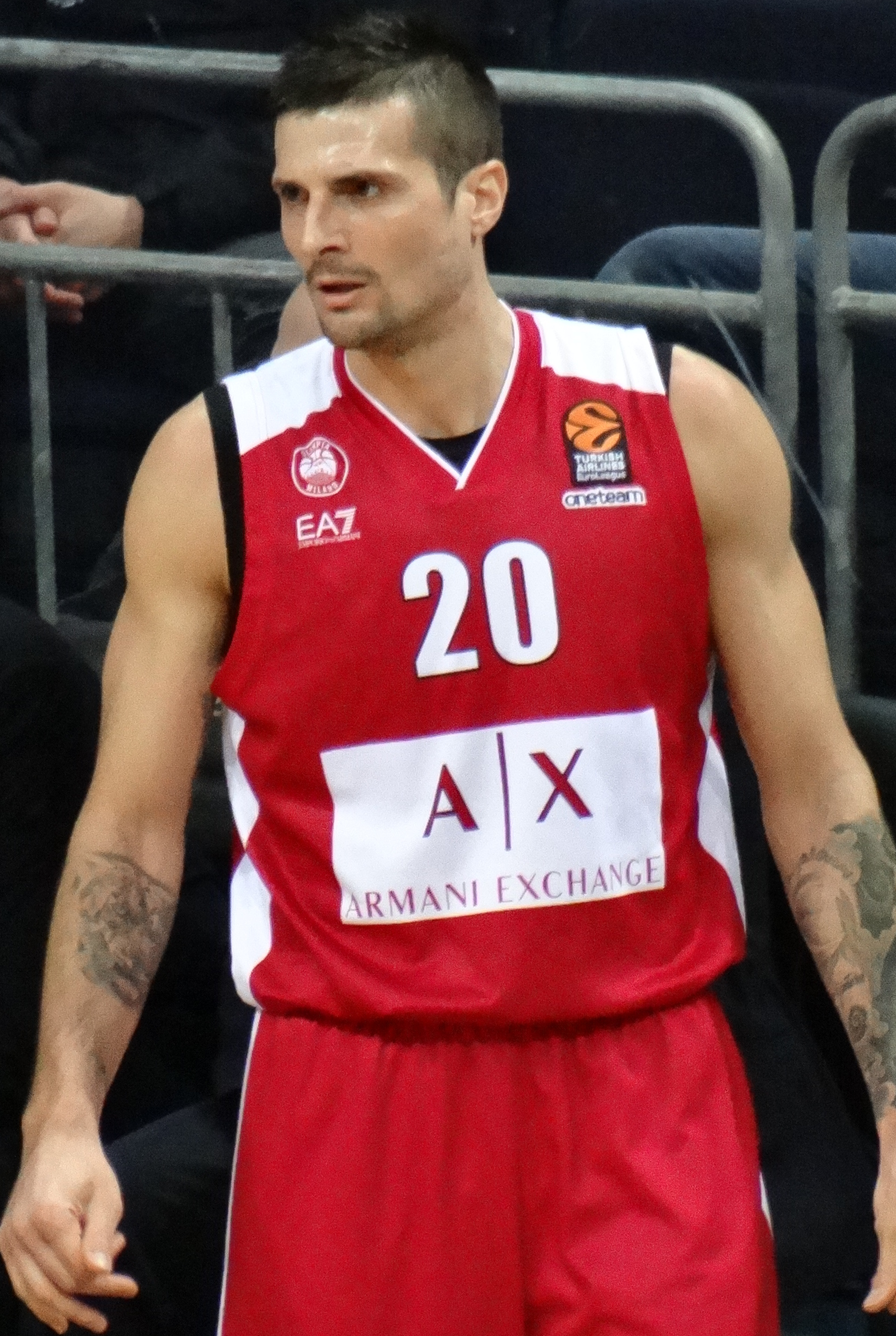
- Cinciarini with Olimpia Milano in 2018

No. 40 – New Basket Brindisi
- Position: Point guard
- League: Serie A2

Personal information
- Born: 21 June 1986 (age 40) Cattolica, Italy
- Listed height: 1.93 m (6 ft 4 in)
- Listed weight: 85 kg (187 lb)

Career information
- NBA draft: 2008: undrafted
- Playing career: 2003–present

Career history
- 2003–2007: VL Pesaro
- 2005–2006: →Senigallia
- 2006–2007: →Pistoia
- 2007–2011: Sutor Montegranaro
- 2008–2009: →Pavia
- 2011–2012: Cantù
- 2012–2015: Reggiana
- 2015–2021: Olimpia Milano
- 2021–2023: Reggiana
- 2023: Zaragoza
- 2023–2024: VL Pesaro
- 2024–2025: Scafati Basket
- 2025–present: New Basket Brindisi

Career highlights
- EuroChallenge champion (2014); EuroChallenge Final Four MVP (2014); FIBA Europe Cup assists leader (2022); 2× Italian League champion (2016, 2018); 3× Italian Cup winner (2016, 2017, 2021); 4× Italian Super Cup winner 2016–2018, 2021); All-Italian League Team (2022); 4× Italian League assists leader (2014, 2015, 2022, 2023)

Andrea Cinciarini (born 21 June 1986) is an Italian professional basketball player for New Basket Brindisi of the Serie A2.

== Professional career ==
In 2012 he signed with Pallacanestro Reggiana.

On 27 April 2014 Cinciarini won the European 3rd-tier league, the EuroChallenge. He also received the EuroChallenge Final Four MVP award, after he had 7 points and 7 assists in the Final, in which Reggiana beat Triumph Lyubertsy 65–79.

On 9 July 2015 Cinciarini signed a multi-year deal with Olimpia Milano. After six seasons in Milano where he was the team captain, he parted ways on 10 August 2021. He returned to Reggio Emilia, signing a three years contract.

On 8 December 2023 he signed with Victoria Libertas Pesaro of the Italian Lega Basket Serie A (LBA).

On 23 September 2024 he signed with Scafati Basket of the Lega Basket Serie A (LBA).

== National team career ==
Since 2009, Cinciarini has been a part of the senior men's Italian national team.

He was called up to the squad that would take part in EuroBasket 2015, which began on 5 September.

== Career statistics ==
Legend
GP	Games played	GS	Games started	MPG	Minutes per game
FG%	Field-goal percentage	3P%	3-point field-goal percentage	FT%	Free-throw percentage
RPG	Rebounds per game	APG	Assists per game	SPG	Steals per game
BPG	Blocks per game	PPG	Points per game	PIR	Performance index rating
**Bold**	Career high

=== Euroleague ===
Year	Team	GP	GS	MPG	FG%	3P%	FT%	RPG	APG	SPG	BPG	PPG	PIR
2011–12	Bennet Cantù	16	16	25.3	.380	.348	.714	2.6	2.3	0.4	0.1	5.2	4.8
2015–16	Olimpia Milano	8	7	21.9	.381	.500	.600	2.1	3.1	1.0	0.0	5.4	5.4
2016–17	Olimpia Milano	23	9	18.5	.455	.250	.700	2.4	2.2	0.7	0.1	5.5	6.0
2017–18	Olimpia Milano	24	8	13.5	.505	.474	.800	2.4	2.1	0.3	0.0	4.5	6.0
2018–19	Olimpia Milano	14	5	11.2	.528	.333	.375	1.4	0.9	0.5	0.1	3.2	2.4
