= Artūrs Strautiņš =

Latvian basketball player (born 1998)

- Strautiņš with BC Roma in 2026

No. 12 – BC Roma
- Position: Shooting guard / small forward
- League: LBA; EuroCup

Personal information
- Born: 23 October 1998 (age 28) Jūrmala, Latvia
- Listed height: 1.98 m (6 ft 6 in)
- Listed weight: 100 kg (220 lb)

Career information
- Playing career: 2012–present

Career history
- 2012–2014: DSN Rīga
- 2013: LMT Basketball Academy
- 2014–2017: Reggiana
- 2017–2018: Orlandina
- 2017–2018: →Pallacanestro Orzinuovi
- 2018–2020: Pallacanestro Trieste
- 2020: Pallalcesto Amatori Udine
- 2020–2021: Pallacanestro Varese
- 2021–2023: Reggio Emilia
- 2023–2026: Derthona Basket
- 2026–present: BC Roma

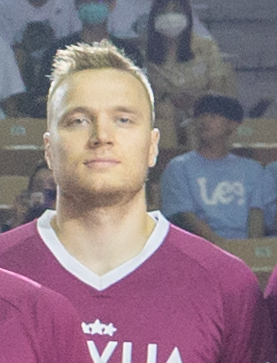
Strautiņš with Latvia men's national basketball team in 2023

Artūrs Strautiņš (born 23 October 1998) is a Latvian professional basketball player who last played for BC Roma of the Italian Lega Basket Serie A (LBA) and the EuroCup.

== Professional career ==
Between 2012 and 2014, Strautiņš played for DSN Rīga in the Latvian Basketball League second division. On 20 October 2013, he became the second youngest player to debut in the Latvian Basketball League first division at the age of 14 years, 11 months and 27 days. He played for the LMT Basketball Academy and recorded three points and four rebounds in a 79-point loss to Latvijas Universitāte. He appeared in one more game for LMT BA on 27 October 2013 before returning to DSN Rīga; in two seasons for Rīga, he appeared in 32 games.

On 18 August 2014, Strautiņš signed with Pallacanestro Reggiana of the Lega Basket Serie A. On 6 January 2015, he helped Reggiana's youth team win the 26th annual Bruna Malaguti Trophy Cadet Tournament and subsequently garnered tournament MVP honours. Four days later, he made his Serie A debut in a 79–56 win over Enel Brindisi. He played a further two games for Reggiana's senior team to close out the 2014–15 season, and in July 2015, he was retained by the team for the 2015–16 season. He scored his first two points for Reggiana in the team's EuroCup game against MHP Riesen Ludwigsburg on October 28, 2015, hitting two free throws in the 76–65 win.

On July 17, 2018, Strautiņš signed a three-year deal with the Italian basketball club Pallacanestro Trieste in LBA.

On January 23, 2020 Strautiņš was released from Trieste and transferred in the Serie A2 second league to Pallalcesto Amatori Udine.

On June 16, 2020 he came back to the Serie A, signing with Pallacanestro Varese to a 2+1 years deal.

On July 4, 2021, he has signed with Reggio Emilia of the Italian Lega Basket Serie A (LBA).

On July 4, 2023, he signed with Derthona Basket of the Italian LBA.

== International career ==
In 2013, Strautiņš debuted for the Latvian national junior team in the Under 16 European Championship, averaging 11.8 points and 7.9 rebounds in eight games. The following year, he again competed for Latvia in the same tournament, this time averaging 12.6 points, 6.7 rebounds and 1.8 assists in nine games.
