= Justin Johnson (basketball) =

American basketball player (born 1996)

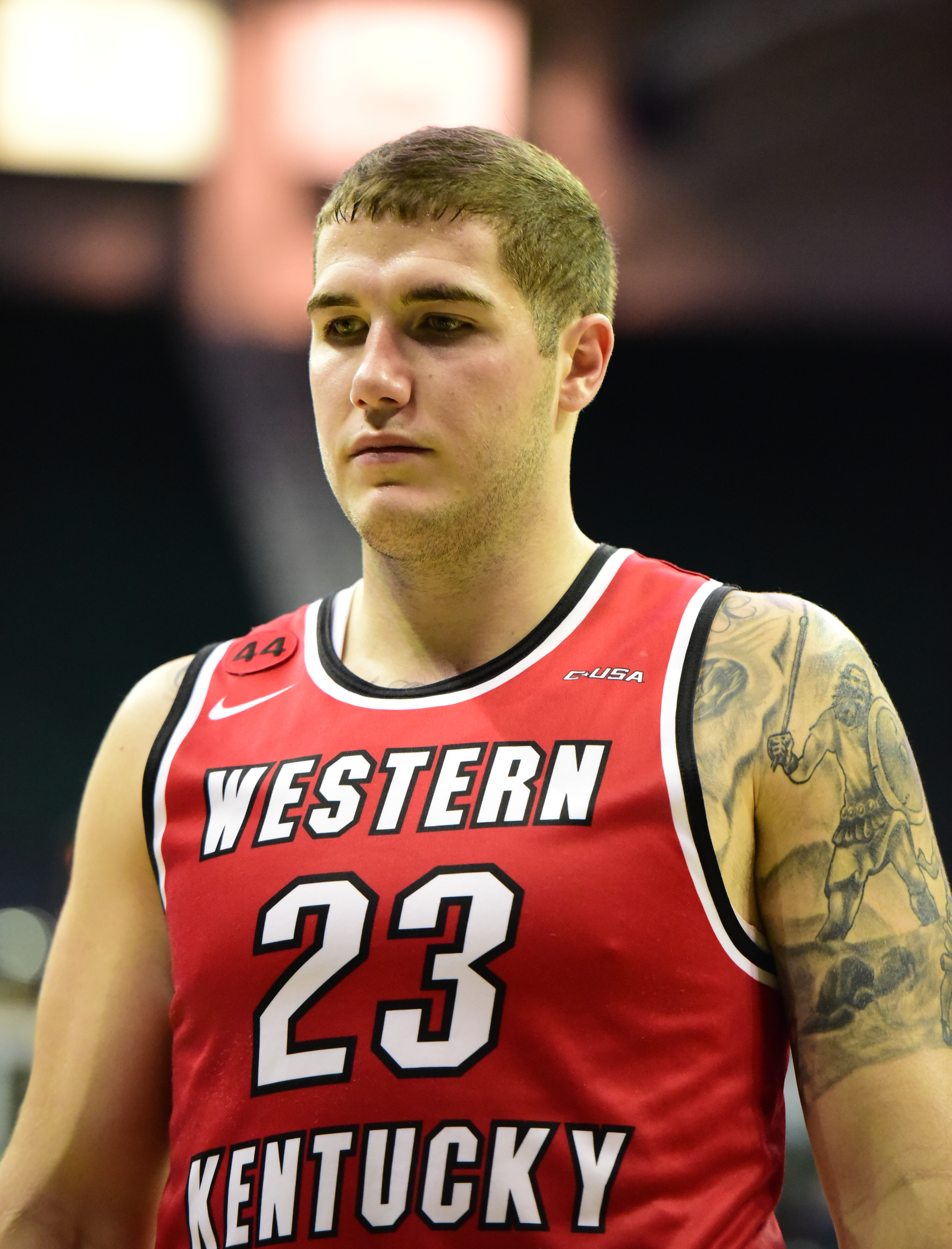

No. 23 – Ironi Nahariya
- Position: Power forward
- League: Liga Leumit

Personal information
- Born: May 23, 1996 (age 30) Bowling Green, Kentucky, U.S.
- Listed height: 6 ft 7 in (2.01 m)
- Listed weight: 238 lb (108 kg)

Career information
- High school: Sheldon Clark (Inez, Kentucky); Perry County Central (Hazard, Kentucky)
- College: Western Kentucky (2014–2018)
- NBA draft: 2018: undrafted
- Playing career: 2018–present

Career history
- 2018–2019: Dinamo Cagliari
- 2019–2020: Pistoia
- 2020–2022: Reggio Emilia
- 2022–2023: Riesen Ludwigsburg
- 2023–2025: Rinascita Basket Rimini
- 2025–2026: Scaligera Basket Verona
- 2026–present: Ironi Nahariya

Career highlights
- First team All-Conference USA (2018); Second team All-Conference USA (2017)

Justin Blake Johnson (born May 23, 1996) is an American professional basketball player for Ironi Nahariya of the Israeli Liga Leumit. He played college basketball for the Western Kentucky Hilltoppers.

== Early life ==
Johnson grew up in Inez, Kentucky with his brother Braxton Johnson and initially attended Sheldon Clark High School in Inez. He transferred to Perry County Central High School after his sophomore year to follow Sheldon Clark's head coach, Kevin Spurlock. As a senior, Johnson averaged 21.9 points and 17.6 rebounds per game and was named to the first team All-State by the Associated Press and the Lexington Herald-Leader.

== College career ==
Johnson played four seasons for the Western Kentucky Hilltoppers. He was a key reserve for the team as a true freshman, averaging 4.8 points (fifth on the team) and 4.1 rebounds (third) per game. He became a starter for WKU as a sophomore, leading the team with 14.9 points and 7.9 rebounds per game in 34 games played (26 starts). He led the team again in points per game with 14.5 and led Conference USA in rebounding with 9.4 per game and in double-doubles with 14 and was named second team All-Conference USA.

After the season, Johnson left the basketball program to join the school's football team as a tight end. He ultimately left the football team during summer training camp to return to basketball for his senior season. In his senior season, Johnson again led the Hilltoppers with 15.7 points per game and also repeated as the conference leader with 9.4 rebounds per game and was named first team All-Conference USA.

== Professional career ==
=== Dinamo Academy Cagliari ===
Johnson signed with Dinamo Academy Cagliari of Serie A2 Basket on July 16, 2018. In his first professional season, Johnson averaged 16.7 points, 9.2 rebounds and 1.3 assists in 29 games played.

=== Pistoia ===
Johnson signed with Pistoia of Lega Basket Serie A (LBA) on July 11, 2019. The 2019–20 season had a disastrous ending: it got interrupted due to the COVID-19 pandemic and saw Pistoia relegated in the Serie A2 for the 2020–21 season.

=== Reggio Emilia ===
Johnson remained in Italy also for the 2020–21 season, signing a one-year deal with Reggio Emilia. He inked a two-year extension with the team on July 21, 2021.

=== Riesen Ludwigsburg ===
On July 15, 2022, he has signed with MHP Riesen Ludwigsburg of the Basketball Bundesliga (BBL).
