= Bahçeşehir Koleji S.K. =

Bahçeşehir Koleji
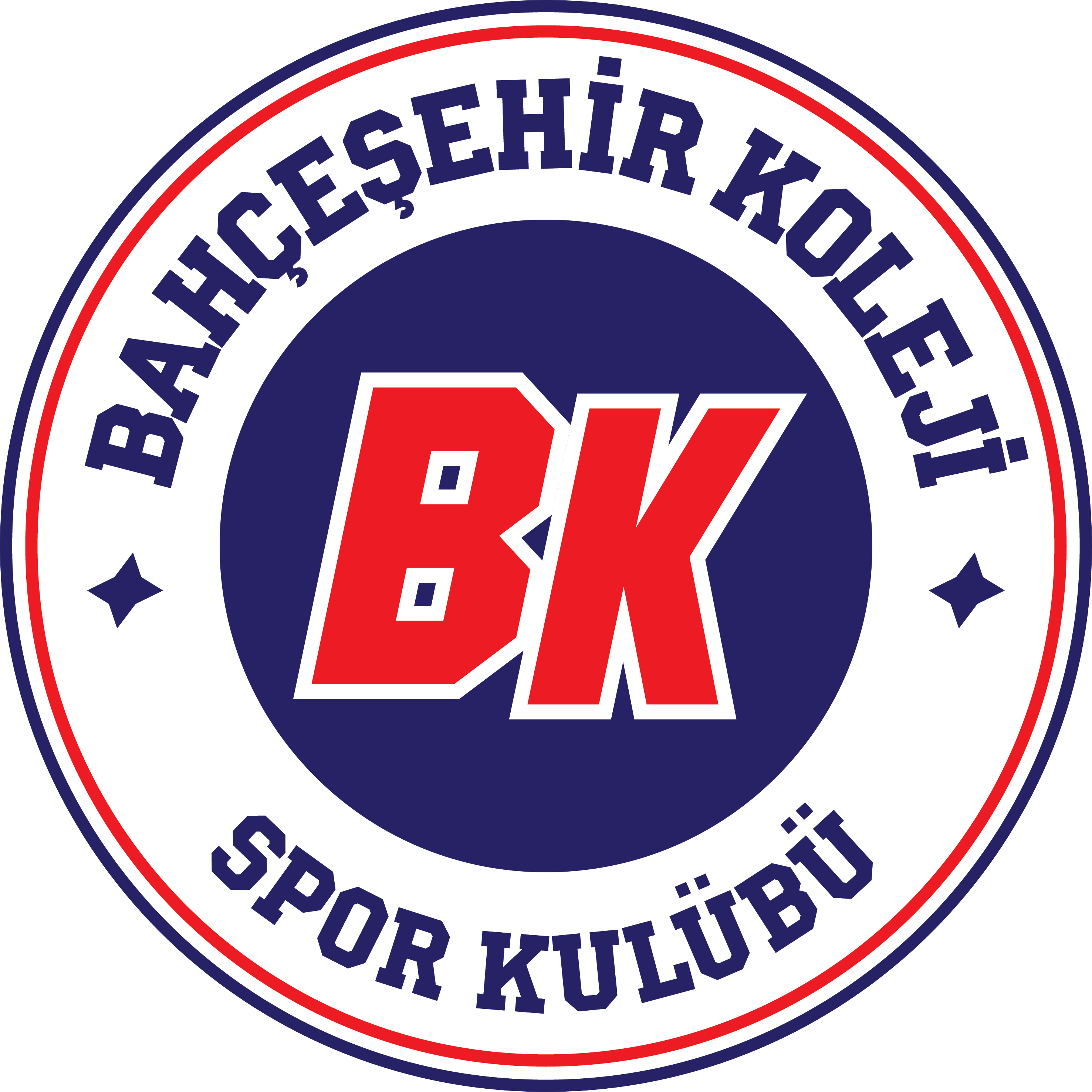
- Nickname: Red Dragons
- Leagues: Basketbol Süper Ligi; EuroCup
- Founded: 2017; 9 years ago
- History: Bahçeşehir Koleji S.K. 2017–present
- Arena: Sinan Erdem Dome
- Capacity: 16,000
- Location: Istanbul, Turkey
- Team colors: Navy, Red, White
- President: Begüm Yücel
- Head coach: Aleksandar Đorđević
- Team captain: Tyler Cavanaugh
- Championships: 1 FIBA Europe Cup
- Website: bahcesehirsporkulubu.org
Home	Away

Bahçeşehir Koleji Spor Kulübü, also known as Bahçeşehir Basketbol, is a Turkish professional basketball club based in Istanbul. The club plays in the Basketbol Süper Ligi (BSL), the highest level of basketball in Turkey, and in the EuroCup. Bahçeşehir made its debut in the BSL in 2018 and made its debut in European competitions in 2019. Bahçeşehir won the FIBA Europe Cup in 2022.

The club is part of Bahçeşehir Koleji, a private school based in Istanbul.

== History ==
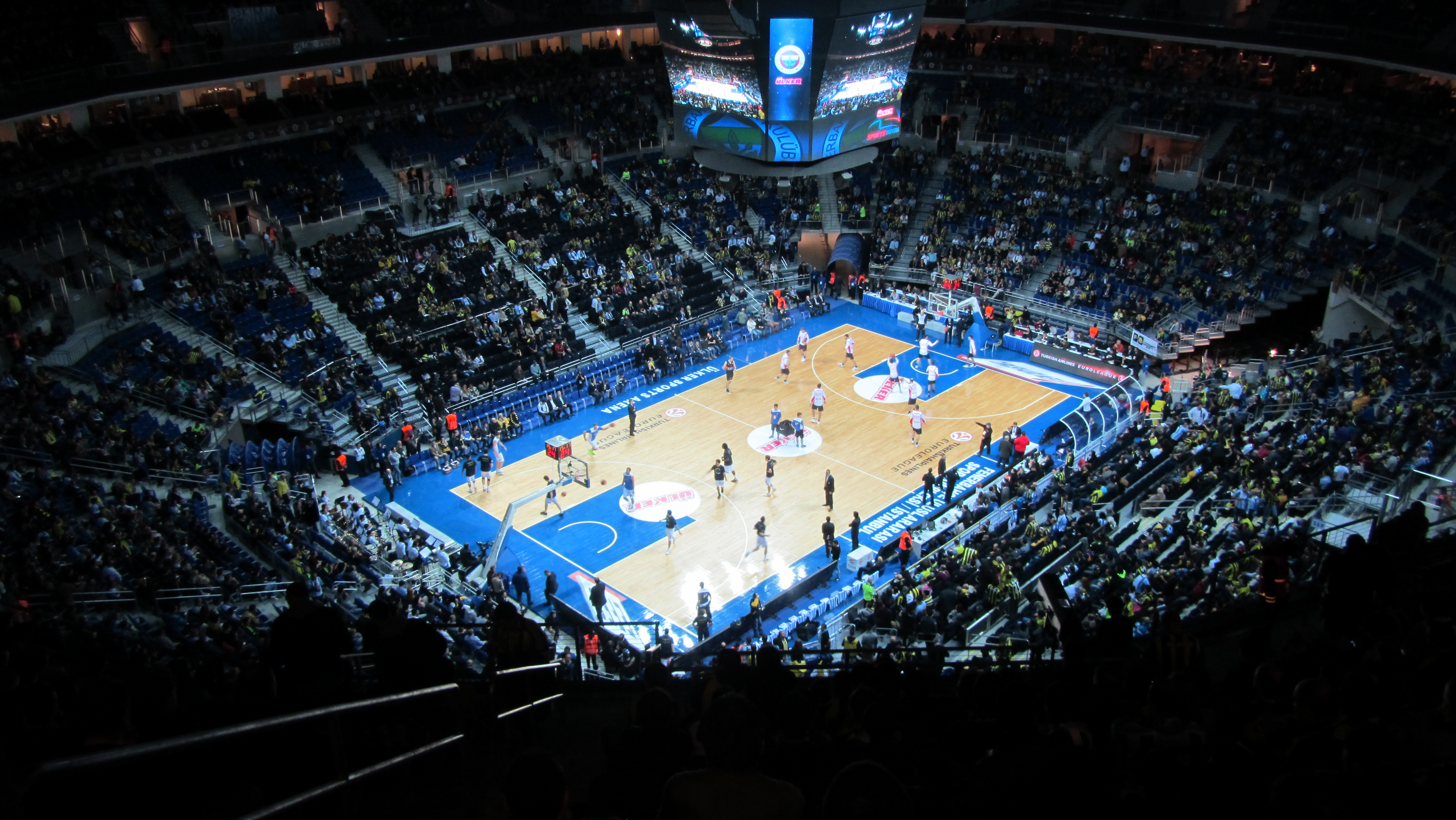
The Ülker Sports Arena, home arena of the club between 2021-2024

In the 2017–18 season, Bahçeşehir reached the finals of the TBL for the first time. On 13 July 2018, Bahçeşehir received the vacant spot in the first-tier Basketbol Süper Ligi, after the withdrawal of Eskişehir Basket. This meant the club's first appearance in the domestic first tier. In the 2018–19 season, finished 9th in the BSL. In the 2019–20 season, Bahçeşehir made its European debut and played in the FIBA Europe Cup regular season. It is the first European participation for Bahçeşehir.

In the 2021–22 season, Bahçeşehir won the 2021–22 FIBA Europe Cup championship after defeating Pallacanestro Reggiana in the Finals.

On 12 June 2025, Bahçeşehir Koleji hired Marko Barać as their new head coach.

== Logos ==
Former logo
(2017–2024)

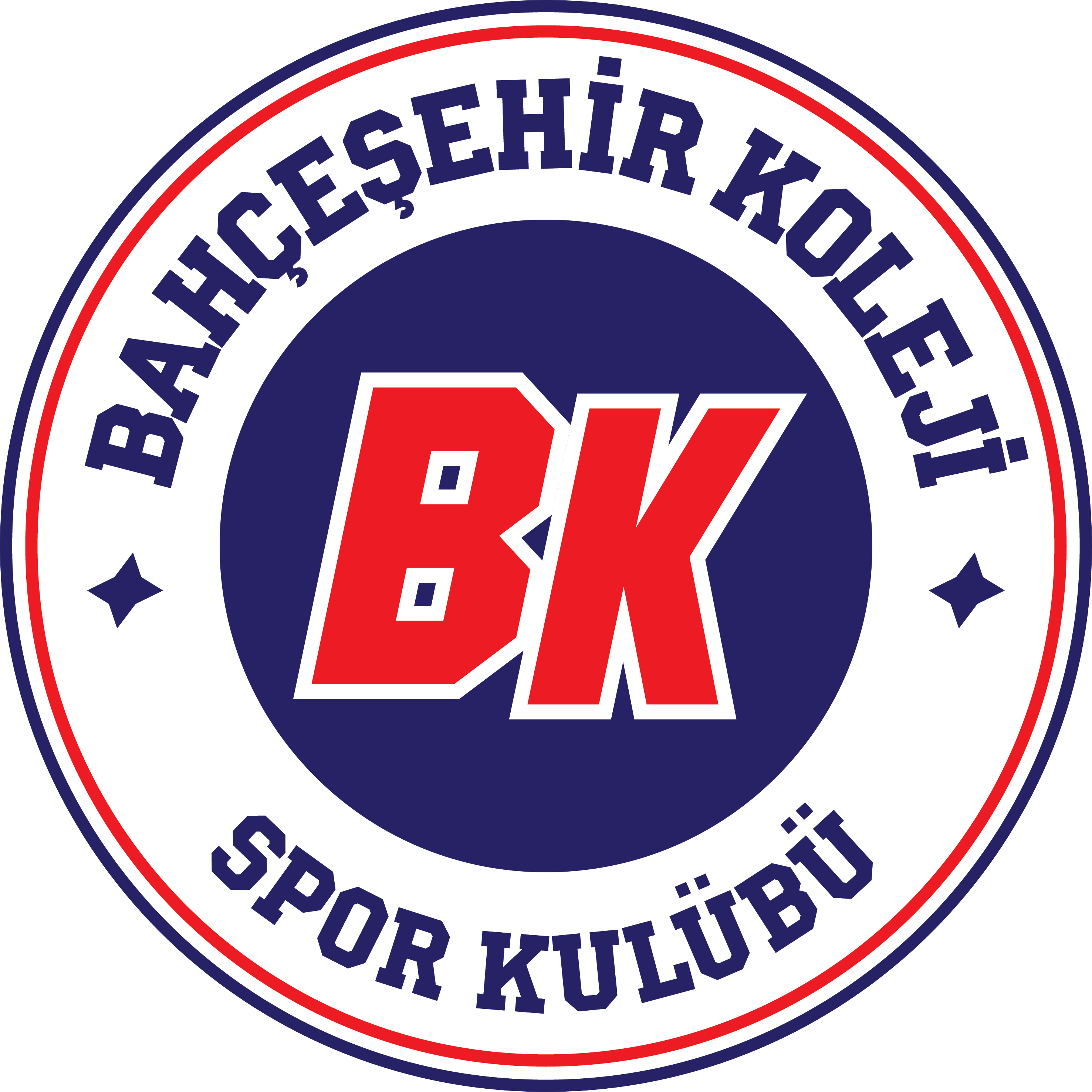
Current logo
(2024–present)

== Players ==
=== Current roster ===
Note: Flags indicate national team eligibility at FIBA-sanctioned events. Players may hold other non-FIBA nationalities not displayed.

Bahçeşehir Koleji roster
Players
Coaches

Pos.	No.	Nat.	Name	Ht.		Age
SG	0	(Georgia (country))	Reed, Marcquise	1.91 m (6 ft 3 in)	88 kg (194 lb)	31 – 21 April 1995
G	4	(Serbia)	Avramović, Aleksa	1.93 m (6 ft 4 in)	87 kg (192 lb)	32 – 25 October 1994
G	5	(Germany)	Akpınar, İsmet	1.91 m (6 ft 3 in)	77 kg (170 lb)	31 – 22 May 1995
F	7	(France)	Inglis, Damien	2.03 m (6 ft 8 in)	109 kg (240 lb)	31 – 20 May 1995
C	14	(Turkey)	Haltalı, Furkan	2.11 m (6 ft 11 in)	95 kg (209 lb)	24 – 2 February 2002
G/F	17	(Turkey)	Mutaf, Can Maxim	1.93 m (6 ft 4 in)	95 kg (209 lb)	35 – 9 January 1991
PG	22	(Turkey)	Flynn, Malachi	1.85 m (6 ft 1 in)	84 kg (185 lb)	28 – 9 May 1998
F	24	(Canada)	Mike, Isiaha	2.03 m (6 ft 8 in)	98 kg (216 lb)	29 – 11 August 1997
PF	34	(United States)	Cavanaugh, Tyler (C)	2.06 m (6 ft 9 in)	108 kg (238 lb)	32 – 9 February 1994
SF	38	(Poland)	Ponitka, Mateusz	1.98 m (6 ft 6 in)	93 kg (205 lb)	33 – 29 August 1993
C	50	(United States)	Williams, Trevion	2.06 m (6 ft 9 in)	120 kg (265 lb)	26 – 16 September 2000
F	51	(United States)	DiLeo, David	2.03 m (6 ft 8 in)	102 kg (225 lb)	29 – 28 February 1997
PG	55	(Turkey)	Sipahi, Kenan	1.97 m (6 ft 6 in)	88 kg (194 lb)	31 – 26 May 1995
F/C	99	(Serbia)	Mitrović, Luka	2.06 m (6 ft 9 in)	102 kg (225 lb)	33 – 21 March 1993

Head coach

- (Serbia) Aleksandar Đorđević

Assistant coach(es)

- (Croatia) Goran Bjedov
- (Turkey) Serhan Aydanarığ
- (Turkey) Can Alyüz
- (Turkey) Arda Kandaş

Strength & conditioning coach(es)

- (Serbia) Mladen Mihajlović

Team manager

- (Turkey) Muhammet Emin Tunç

Legend

- (C) Team captain
- Injured

- Roster
Updated: September 6, 2026

=== Depth chart ===
Pos.	Starting 5	Bench 1	Bench 2	Bench 3
C	Trevion Williams	Luka Mitrović		Furkan Haltalı
PF	Tyler Cavanaugh	Damien Inglis	David DiLeo
SF	Isiaha Mike	Mateusz Ponitka
SG	Marcquise Reed	Aleksa Avramović		Can Maxim Mutaf
PG	Malachi Flynn	Kenan Sipahi	İsmet Akpınar

=== Notable players ===
Note: Flags indicate national team eligibility at FIBA-sanctioned events. Players may hold other non-FIBA nationalities not displayed.

Criteria

To appear in this section a player must have either:

- Set a club record or won an individual award while at the club
- Played at least one official international match for their national team at any time
- Played at least one official NBA match at any time.

- (Turkey) Yiğit Arslan (2022–present)
- (Turkey) Berkay Candan (2021–present)
- (Turkey) Deniz Kılıçlı (2020–2021)
- (Turkey) Rıdvan Öncel (2020–2021)
- (Turkey) Kartal Özmızrak (2021–present)
- (Turkey) Emir Preldžić (2018–2019)
- (Turkey) Oğuz Savaş (2021–present)
- (Turkey) Burak Can Yıldızlı (2020–2021)
- (Australia) Mangok Mathiang (2019–2020)
- (Canada) Andy Rautins (2019–2020)
- (Germany) İsmet Akpınar (2020–2021)
- (Ghana) Ben Bentil
- (Slovenia) Jaka Blažič (2022–2023)
- (Mexico) Alex Pérez (2020)
- (Spain) Quino Colom (2018–2019)
- (Puerto Rico) Tai Odiase (2024–2025)
- (United States) (Croatia) Jaleen Smith
- (United States) Chris Babb (2018–2019)
- (United States) Tarik Black (2022)
- (United States) Sam Dekker (2021–2022)
- (United States) Erick Green (2020–2021)
- (United States) Manny Harris (2018–2019)
- (United States) JaJuan Johnson (2019–2020)
- (United States) London Perrantes (2019–2020)
- (United States) Thomas Robinson (2020)
- (United States) Jamar Smith (2021–2023)
- (United States) D. J. White (2017–2019)

== Head coaches ==
- (Greece) Stefanos Dedas (2017–2019)
- (Turkey) Zafer Aktaş (2019–2020)
- (Turkey) Erhan Ernak (2020–2023)
- (Turkey) Sinan Atalay (2023)
- (Montenegro) Dejan Radonjić (2023–2025)
- (Serbia) Marko Barać (2025–2026)
- (Serbia) Aleksandar Đorđević (2026–present)

== Honours ==
=== European competitions ===
- EuroCup

Semifinalist (2): 2024–25, 2025–26

- FIBA Europe Cup

Champions (1): 2021–22
Runners-up (1): 2023–24
Semifinalist (1): 2019–20

== Season by season ==
Season	Tier	League	Pos.	Record	Turkish Cup	European competitions	
2017–18	2	TBL	6th	22–12			
2018–19	1	BSL	9th	13–15			
2019–20	1	BSL	–^{1}	7–16		4 FIBA Europe Cup	SF^{1}
2020–21	1	BSL	12th	10–20			
2021–22	1	BSL	6th	18–14	Quarterfinalist	4 FIBA Europe Cup	C
2022–23	1	BSL	9th	13–17		3 Champions League	R16
2023–24	1	BSL	13th	12–18	Quarterfinalist	4 FIBA Europe Cup	RU
2024–25	1	BSL	5th	18–12	Quarterfinalist	2 EuroCup	SF
2025–26	1	BSL	3rd	25–12	Quarterfinalist	2 EuroCup	SF

^1 Cancelled due to the COVID-19 pandemic in Europe.
