= 2021–22 FIBA Europe Cup =

7th season of the FIBA Europe Cup

- Season: 2021–22
- Dates: Qualifying: 28 September–1 October 2021; Competition proper: 13 October 2021 – 27 April 2022
- Teams: 32 (regular season); 45 (all rounds)

Finals
- Champions: (Turkey) Bahçeşehir Koleji (1st title)
- Runners-up: (Italy) UnaHotels Reggio Emilia
- Semi-finalists: (Denmark) Bakken Bears (Netherlands) ZZ Leiden
- Finals MVP: (United States) Jamar Smith

Statistical leaders
Points	(United States) T. J. Shorts	17.6
Rebounds	(United States) Travis Taylor	9.1
Assists	(Italy) Andrea Cinciarini	10.1
Index Rating	(United States) Isaiah Reese	19.3

Seasons
- ← 2020–21 2022–23 →

The 2021–22 FIBA Europe Cup was the 7th season of the FIBA Europe Cup, a European professional basketball competition for clubs, that was launched by FIBA. The season began on 13 October 2021 and ended on 27 April 2022 with the 2022 FIBA Europe Cup Finals.

Bahçeşehir Koleji won their first league title.

== Team allocation ==
14 teams eliminated in the Basketball Champions League qualification rounds could join directly the regular season, depending on their decision as declared in the FIBA Europe Cup option form. The following 9 teams chose the option of ending their continental adventure if they were eliminated from the Champions League qualifying rounds and therefore refuse to participate in the FIBA Europe Cup:

- (Bulgaria) Levski Lukoil
- (Croatia) Split
- (Cyprus) AEK Larnaca
- (Estonia) Kalev/Cramo
- (Finland) Salon Vilpas
- (France) Le Mans
- (Germany) Brose Bamberg
- (Lithuania) Juventus
- (Switzerland) Fribourg Olympic

=== Teams ===
On 26 July 2021, the list of 33 registered clubs was announced by FIBA Europe.

- 1st, 2nd, etc.: Place in the domestic competition
- CL QR1, QR2, QR3: Losers from the Champions League qualifying rounds
- TH: FIBA Europe Cup title holders

Regular season
(Belarus) Tsmoki-Minsk (CL QR3)	(France) ~~Le Mans~~ (CL QR2)	(Bulgaria) ~~Levski Lukoil~~ (CL QR1)	(Bulgaria) Rilski Sportist (2nd)	(Poland) Legia Warsaw (4th)
(Lithuania) ~~Juventus~~ (CL QR3)	(Germany) ~~Brose Bamberg~~ (CL QR2)	(Cyprus) ~~AEK Larnaca~~ (CL QR1)	(Germany) Hakro Merlins Crailsheim (6th)	(Romania) CSM Oradea (2nd)
(Switzerland) ~~Fribourg Olympic~~ (CL QR3)	(Greece) Peristeri (CL QR2)	(Finland) ~~Salon Vilpas~~ (CL QR1)	(Greece) Ionikos (8th)	(Russia) Avtodor (9th)
(Russia) PARMA-PARIMATCH (CL QR3)	(Montenegro) Mornar (CL QR2)	(Israel) Hapoel Eilat (CL QR1)	(Hungary) Szolnoki Olajbányász (2nd)	(Spain) Casademont Zaragoza (13th)
(Croatia) ~~Split~~ (CL QR2)	(Netherlands) ZZ Leiden (CL QR2)	(Portugal) Sporting CP (CL QR1)	(Israel) Hapoel Gilboa Galil (2nd)	(Turkey) Bahçeşehir Koleji (12th)
(Czech Republic) Opava (CL QR2)	(Austria) Kapfenberg Bulls (CL QR1)	(United Kingdom) London Lions (CL QR1)	(Italy) UNAHOTELS Reggio Emilia (11th)	(Ukraine) Kyiv-Basket (3rd)
(Denmark) Bakken Bears (CL QR2)	(Belgium) Belfius Mons-Hainaut (CL QR1)	(Belgium) Telenet Giants Antwerp (3rd)	(Netherlands) Heroes Den Bosch (2nd)	
Qualifying rounds
(Austria) Swans Gmunden (1st)	(North Macedonia) Kumanovo (5th)	(Bulgaria) Academic Plovdiv (3rd)	(Greece) Iraklis (10th)	(Romania) CSO Voluntari (4th)
(Austria) GGMT Vienna (7th)	(North Macedonia) TFT Skopje (7th)	(Cyprus) Keravnos (2nd)	(Hungary) Naturtex-SZTE Szedeák (3rd)	(Russia) Enisey (11th)
(Israel) Hapoel Haifa (5th)	(Portugal) FC Porto (2nd)	(Estonia) Pärnu Sadam (2nd)	(Netherlands) Donar (3rd)	(Ukraine) Dnipro (4th)
(Israel) Ironi Ness Ziona^{TH} (7th)	(Portugal) Benfica (4th)	(Germany) Medi Bayreuth (10th)	(Poland) Trefl Sopot (5th)	

== Schedule ==
The schedule of the competition will be as follows.

Schedule for 2021–22 FIBA Europe Cup
Phase	Round	Draw date	First leg	Second leg
Qualifying rounds	First qualifying round	19 August 2021	28 September 2021	
Qualifying rounds	Second qualifying round	19 August 2021	29 September 2021	
Qualifying rounds	Third qualifying round	19 August 2021	1 October 2021	
Regular season	Round 1	19 August 2021	12–13 October 2021	
Regular season	Round 2	19 August 2021	19–20 October 2021	
Regular season	Round 3	19 August 2021	26–27 October 2021	
Regular season	Round 4	19 August 2021	2–4 November 2021	
Regular season	Round 5	19 August 2021	9–11 November 2021	
Regular season	Round 6	19 August 2021	17 November 2021	
Second round	Round 1	19 August 2021	8 December 2021	
Second round	Round 2	19 August 2021	15 December 2021	
Second round	Round 3	19 August 2021	12 January 2022	
Second round	Round 4	19 August 2021	26 January 2022	
Second round	Round 5	19 August 2021	2 February 2022	
Second round	Round 6	19 August 2021	9 February 2022	
Quarter-Finals		19 August 2021	9 March 2022	16 March 2022
Semi-Finals		19 August 2021	30 March 2022	6 April 2022
Finals		19 August 2021	20 April 2022	27 April 2022

== Qualifying rounds ==
=== Draw ===
The nineteen teams will be divided into 5 pots. For the quarter-finals round of Qualifications, teams from Pot 5 will be drawn against teams from Pot 4. Clubs from Pot 1, 2 and 3 will be seeded, and will enter directly in the semi-final stage of Qualifications. Teams from pot 1 will face the winners from the quarter-finals round, and teams from pot 3 will be drawn against teams from Pot 2. The winners of the semi-final stage will face each other in the finals of Qualifications. The four winners of the finals will then qualify for the Regular season and join the fourteen directly qualified teams and the fourteen Basketball Champions League eliminated teams in the main draw.

Pot 1 Team (Israel) Ironi Ness Ziona (Netherlands) Donar (Germany) Medi Bayreuth (Ukraine) Dnipro	Pot 2 Team (Portugal) Benfica (Greece) Iraklis (Cyprus) Keravnos (Russia) Enisey	Pot 3 Team (Portugal) Porto (Israel) Hapoel Haifa (Romania) Voluntari (Bulgaria) Academic Plovdiv	Pot 4 Team (Hungary) Naturtex-SZTE Szedeák (Poland) Trefl Sopot (Austria) Swans Gmunden (Estonia) Pärnu Sadam	Pot 5 Team (Austria) GGMT Vienna (North Macedonia) Kumanovo (North Macedonia) TFT Skopje

==== Qualification Group A ====
Venue: MartiniPlaza, Groningen

Quarterfinals
28 September
(North Macedonia) Kumanovo	60
(Austria) Swans Gmunden	83

Semifinals
29 September
(Austria) Swans Gmunden	53
(Netherlands) Donar (H)	80
29 September
(Portugal) Benfica	83
(Romania) Voluntari	77

Final
1 October
(Netherlands) Donar	73
(Portugal) Benfica	81

==== Qualification Group B ====
Venue: Triaditza Hall, Sofia

Semifinals
29 September
(Ukraine) Dnipro	82
(Poland) Trefl Sopot	88
29 September
(Greece) Iraklis	95
(Bulgaria) Academic Plovdiv (H)	75

Final
1 October
(Poland) Trefl Sopot	72
(Greece) Iraklis	74

==== Qualification Group C ====
Venue: Arena Sever, Krasnoyarsk

Quarterfinals
28 September
(North Macedonia) TFT Skopje	76
(Hungary) Naturtex-SZTE Szedeák	92

Semifinals
29 September
(Germany) Medi Bayreuth	84
(Hungary) Naturtex-SZTE Szedeák	77
29 September
(Russia) Enisey (H)	80
(Israel) Hapoel Haifa	85

Final
1 October
(Germany) Medi Bayreuth	80
(Israel) Hapoel Haifa	75

==== Qualification Group D ====
Venue: Pärnu Sports Hall, Pärnu

Quarterfinals
28 September
(Austria) GGMT Vienna	67
(Estonia) Pärnu Sadam (H)	72

Semifinals
29 September
(Israel) Ironi Ness Ziona	86
(Estonia) Pärnu Sadam	82
29 September
(Cyprus) Keravnos	58
(Portugal) Porto	70

Final
1 October
(Israel) Ironi Ness Ziona	70
(Portugal) Porto	79

==== Lucky losers ====
Following the qualification of U-BT Cluj-Napoca and Prometey to the Champions League, two lucky losers will also qualify for the regular season. Their identity will be determined in accordance with section D from FIBA Basketball Rules as follows:

1. Point difference of the combined results from the Semi-Finals and Finals will be used as the first criterion.
2. Points scored in the Semi-Finals and Finals will be used as the second criterion.
3. If the identity of the two is not determined using the previous two criteria, a draw will be held to determine the final classification.

Pos	Team	PF	PA	PD	Qualification
1	(Netherlands) Donar	153	134	+19	Advance to regular season
2	(Poland) Trefl Sopot	160	156	+4	Advance to regular season
3	(Israel) Hapoel Haifa	160	160	0	
4	(Israel) Ironi Ness Ziona	156	161	-5	

== Regular season ==
=== Draw ===
The draw took place in Freising, Germany at 12:00 CET on August 19.

The thirty-two teams will be divided into 4 Seeds and will be drawn into eight groups of four. A maximum of two clubs from the same country can be in the same group. In each group, teams play against each other home-and-away in a round-robin format. The group winners and runners-up advance to the second round, while the third-placed teams and fourth-placed teams are eliminated. Additionally, Based on a decision of the Board of FIBA Europe, clubs from Russia and Ukraine will be drawn into separate groups in the Draw for the Regular Season.

Seed 1 Team (Romania) Oradea (Spain) Casademont Zaragoza (Turkey) Bahçeşehir Koleji (Russia) Parma (Ukraine) Kyiv-Basket (Belgium) Telenet Giants Antwerp (Romania) ~~U-BT Cluj-Napoca~~^{⊕} (Belarus) Tsmoki-Minsk	Seed 2 Team (Netherlands) ZZ Leiden (Denmark) Bakken Bears (Belgium) Belfius Mons-Hainaut (Austria) Kapfenberg Bulls (Netherlands) Heroes Den Bosch (Hungary) Szolnoki Olajbányász (Bulgaria) Rilski Sportist (Italy) Reggiana	Seed 3 Team (United Kingdom) London Lions (Greece) Peristeri (Russia) Avtodor (Ukraine) ~~Prometey~~^{⊕} (Portugal) Sporting CP (Poland) Legia Warsaw (Montenegro) Mornar (Czech Republic) Opava	Seed 4 Team (Israel) Hapoel Eilat (Germany) Hakro Merlins Crailsheim (Greece) Ionikos (Israel) Hapoel Gilboa Galil (Portugal) Benfica (Winner Qualifying A) (Greece) Iraklis (Winner Qualifying B) (Germany) Medi Bayreuth (Winner Qualifying C) (Portugal) Porto (Winner Qualifying D)

Notes

^⊕ Indicates teams qualified for BCL Regular Season, and two runners-up of the FEC Qualifiers filled their spots.

=== Group A ===
Pos	Team	Pld	W	L	PF	PA	PD	Pts	Qualification	BAY	LON	DON	KAP
1	(Germany) Medi Bayreuth	6	5	1	516	443	+73	11	Advance to second round	—	97–78	84–61	83–79
2	(United Kingdom) London Lions	6	5	1	501	444	+57	11	Advance to second round	91–81	—	85–67	68–58
3	(Netherlands) Donar	6	2	4	426	463	−37	8		64–71	60–79	—	85–59
4	(Austria) Kapfenberg Bulls	6	0	6	432	525	−93	6		70–100	81–100	85–89	—

Source: Groups Standings
Legend: Blue = home team win; Red = away team win.

=== Group B ===
Pos	Team	Pld	W	L	PF	PA	PD	Pts	Qualification	KYI	SOP	EIL	RIL
1	(Ukraine) Kyiv-Basket	6	4	2	447	440	+7	10	Advance to second round	—	69–68	62–71	84–62
2	(Poland) Trefl Sopot	6	3	3	481	451	+30	9	Advance to second round	65–66	—	85–88	90–81
3	(Israel) Hapoel Eilat	6	3	3	497	494	+3	9		78–86	83–89	—	83–86
4	(Bulgaria) Rilski Sportist	6	2	4	475	515	−40	8		96–80	64–84	86–94	—

Source: Groups Standings
Legend: Blue = home team win; Red = away team win.

=== Group C ===
Pos	Team	Pld	W	L	PF	PA	PD	Pts	Qualification	BEN	PAR	HDB	OPA
1	(Portugal) Benfica	6	5	1	511	485	+26	11	Advance to second round	—	83–69	73–78	86–84
2	(Russia) Parma	6	4	2	505	449	+56	10	Advance to second round	89–92	—	67–52	106–84
3	(Netherlands) Heroes Den Bosch	6	2	4	440	480	−40	8		76–78	75–92	—	87–82
4	(Czech Republic) Opava	6	1	5	490	532	−42	7		89–99	63–82	88–72	—

Source: Groups Standings
Legend: Blue = home team win; Red = away team win.

=== Group D ===
Pos	Team	Pld	W	L	PF	PA	PD	Pts	Qualification	AVT	REG	CAZ	HGG
1	(Russia) Avtodor	6	5	1	562	463	+99	11	Advance to second round	—	91–84	100–80	102–62
2	(Italy) Reggiana	6	4	2	497	457	+40	10	Advance to second round	80–77	—	76–67	93–70
3	(Spain) Casademont Zaragoza	6	2	4	484	515	−31	8		86–92	82–77	—	78–80
4	(Israel) Hapoel Gilboa Galil	6	1	5	443	551	−108	7		71–100	70–87	90–91	—

Source: Groups Standings
Legend: Blue = home team win; Red = away team win.

=== Group E ===
Pos	Team	Pld	W	L	PF	PA	PD	Pts	Qualification	BAH	LEI	MOR	IRA
1	(Turkey) Bahçeşehir Koleji	6	6	0	483	413	+70	12	Advance to second round	—	84–61	75–68	86–66
2	(Netherlands) ZZ Leiden	6	3	3	445	469	−24	9	Advance to second round	69–79	—	78–73	71–63
3	(Montenegro) Mornar	6	2	4	484	470	+14	8		86–95	87–74	—	88–65
4	(Greece) Iraklis	6	1	5	423	483	−60	7		63–64	83–92	83–82	—

Source: Groups Standings
Legend: Blue = home team win; Red = away team win.

=== Group F ===
Pos	Team	Pld	W	L	PF	PA	PD	Pts	Qualification	SPO	ANT	ION	MON
1	(Portugal) Sporting CP	6	4	2	468	413	+55	10	Advance to second round	—	77–53	87–54	75–65
2	(Belgium) Telenet Giants Antwerp	6	3	3	471	472	−1	9	Advance to second round	80–75	—	87–90	77–63
3	(Greece) Ionikos	6	3	3	470	497	−27	9		93–79	81–92	—	74–77
4	(Belgium) Belfius Mons-Hainaut	6	2	4	434	461	−27	8		68–75	86–82	75–78	—

Source: Groups Standings
Legend: Blue = home team win; Red = away team win.

=== Group G ===
Pos	Team	Pld	W	L	PF	PA	PD	Pts	Qualification	CRA	BAK	PER	MNS
1	(Germany) Hakro Merlins Crailsheim	6	4	2	494	438	+56	10	Advance to second round	—	77–86	78–55	77–81
2	(Denmark) Bakken Bears	6	4	2	524	501	+23	10	Advance to second round	78–91	—	83–75	101–93
3	(Greece) Peristeri	6	2	4	446	477	−31	8		66–76	85–83	—	80–70
4	(Belarus) Tsmoki-Minsk	6	2	4	483	531	−48	8		72–95	80–93	87–85	—

Source: Groups Standings
Legend: Blue = home team win; Red = away team win.

=== Group H ===
Pos	Team	Pld	W	L	PF	PA	PD	Pts	Qualification	LEG	ORA	POR	SZO
1	(Poland) Legia Warsaw	6	6	0	462	410	+52	12	Advance to second round	—	75–68	71–61	83–66
2	(Romania) Oradea	6	3	3	417	412	+5	9	Advance to second round	66–76	—	67–58	78–70
3	(Portugal) Porto	6	2	4	415	432	−17	8		81–82	75–63	—	76–68
4	(Hungary) Szolnoki Olajbányász	6	1	5	411	451	−40	7		68–75	58–75	81–64	—

Source: Groups Standings
Legend: Blue = home team win; Red = away team win.

== Second round ==
=== Group I ===
Pos	Team	Pld	W	L	PF	PA	PD	Pts	Qualification	LEI	LEG	PAR	BAY
1	(Netherlands) ZZ Leiden	6	5	1	512	489	+23	11	Advance to Quarter Finals	—	78–90	79–75	98–93
2	(Poland) Legia Warsaw	6	4	2	472	437	+35	10	Advance to Quarter Finals	59–77	—	70–72	80–55
3	(Russia) Parma	6	3	3	485	481	+4	9		88–91	67–78 (Note: Match was originally scheduled to be played on January 26 but was postponed to February 15 because of COVID-19-related disruptions)	—	92–78
4	(Germany) Medi Bayreuth	6	0	6	483	545	−62	6		84–89	88–95 (Note: Match postponed because of COVID-19-related disruptions)	85–91	—

Source: Second Round Standings
Legend: Blue = home team win; Red = away team win.

=== Group J ===
Pos	Team	Pld	W	L	PF	PA	PD	Pts	Qualification	REG	CRA	ANT	KYI
1	(Italy) Reggiana	6	5	1	408	402	+6	11	Advance to Quarter Finals	—	79–70 (Note: Match was originally scheduled to be played on January 26 but was postponed to February 11 because of COVID-19-related disruptions)	86–72	20–0 (Note: Match was originally scheduled to be played on February 2 but was postponed to February 15 because of COVID-19-related disruptions. The re-arranged match had not taken place as scheduled. Kyiv-Basket was not able to fly to Italy due to the uncertain status of the airspace of Ukraine (due to the current situation of political instability in Ukraine), as well as the insufficient number of players in the team. Kyiv-Basket forfeited the game.)
2	(Germany) Hakro Merlins Crailsheim	6	3	3	473	453	+20	9	Advance to Quarter Finals	80–84	—	91–86	82–62
3	(Belgium) Telenet Giants Antwerp	6	2	4	493	475	+18	8		101–59	69–79	—	83–70 (Note: Match was originally scheduled to be played on January 26 but was postponed to February 5 because of COVID-19-related disruptions)
4	(Ukraine) Kyiv-Basket	6	2	4	374	418	−44	7		79–80	73–71	90–82	—

Source: Second Round Standings
Legend: Blue = home team win; Red = away team win.

=== Group K ===
Pos	Team	Pld	W	L	PF	PA	PD	Pts	Qualification	ORA	SPO	BEN	SOP
1	(Romania) Oradea	6	5	1	443	420	+23	11	Advance to Quarter Finals	—	72–55 (Note: Match was originally scheduled to be played on February 2 but was postponed to February 18 because of COVID-19-related disruptions)	68–56	80–65
2	(Portugal) Sporting CP	6	4	2	452	426	+26	10	Advance to Quarter Finals	77–83	—	89–72	76–63
3	(Portugal) Benfica	6	2	4	429	432	−3	8		94–57	64–72 (Note: Match was originally scheduled to be played on January 11 but was postponed to January 19 because of COVID-19-related disruptions)	—	67–79
4	(Poland) Trefl Sopot	6	1	5	419	465	−46	7		73–83 (Note: Match postponed because of COVID-19-related disruptions)	72–83	67–76	—

Source: Second Round Standings
Legend: Blue = home team win; Red = away team win.

=== Group L ===
Pos	Team	Pld	W	L	PF	PA	PD	Pts	Qualification	BAH	BAK	LON	AVT
1	(Turkey) Bahçeşehir Koleji	6	5	1	526	474	+52	11	Advance to Quarter Finals	—	90–76	107–82	97–95
2	(Denmark) Bakken Bears	6	1	5	505	536	−31	7	Advance to Quarter Finals	85–86	—	95–80	95–96
3	(United Kingdom) London Lions	6	1	5	463	541	−78	7		61–76	82–75	—	77–104
4	(Russia) Avtodor (Note: On 2 March 2022, FIBA Europe announced it was banning all Russian teams from its competition as a response to the 2022 Russian invasion of Ukraine.)	6	5	1	556	499	+57	11	Excluded	75–70	102–79 (Note: Match was originally scheduled to be played on January 27 but was postponed to February 14 because of COVID-19-related disruptions)	84–81	—

Source: Second Round Standings
Legend: Blue = home team win; Red = away team win.

== Play-offs ==
The playoffs began on 9 March 2022 and ended on 27 April 2022 with the 2022 FIBA Europe Cup Finals.

Quarter-finals; 9, 10 & 16 March
(Netherlands) ZZ Leiden	68	85	153
(Germany) Hakro Merlins Crailsheim	71	77	148
(Turkey) Bahçeşehir Koleji	73	66	139
(Portugal) Sporting CP	70	54	124
(Italy) UnaHotels Reggio Emilia	71	80	151
(Poland) Legia Warsaw	68	75	143
(Romania) Oradea	82	61	143
(Denmark) Bakken Bears	84	70	154

Semi-finals; 30 March & 6 April
(Netherlands) ZZ Leiden	71	82	153
(Turkey) Bahçeşehir Koleji	77	90	167
(Italy) UnaHotels Reggio Emilia	72	92	164
(Denmark) Bakken Bears	74	72	146

Finals; 20 & 27 April
(Turkey) Bahçeşehir Koleji	72	90	162
(Italy) UnaHotels Reggio Emilia	69	74	143

=== Quarterfinals ===
The first legs were played on 9 and 10 March 2022, and the second legs were played on 16 March 2022.

Team 1	Agg.	Team 2	1st leg	2nd leg
ZZ Leiden (Netherlands)	153–148	(Germany) Hakro Merlins Crailsheim	71–68	85–77
Oradea (Romania)	143–154	(Denmark) Bakken Bears	82–84	61–70
UnaHotels Reggio Emilia (Italy)	151–143	(Poland) Legia Warsaw	71–68	80–75
Bahçeşehir Koleji (Turkey)	139–124	(Portugal) Sporting CP	73–70	66–54

=== Semifinals ===
The first legs were played on 30 March 2022, and the second legs were played on 6 April 2022.

Team 1	Agg.	Team 2	1st leg	2nd leg
ZZ Leiden (Netherlands)	153–167	(Turkey) Bahçeşehir Koleji	71–77	82–90
UnaHotels Reggio Emilia (Italy)	164–146	(Denmark) Bakken Bears	72–74	92–72

=== Finals ===
The first leg was played on 20 April 2022, and the second leg was played on 27 April 2022.

Team 1	Agg.	Team 2	1st leg	2nd leg
UnaHotels Reggio Emilia (Italy)	143–162	(Turkey) Bahçeşehir Koleji	69–72	74–90

== Individual awards ==
=== FIBA Europe Cup Final MVP ===
Player	Team	Ref.
(United States) Jamar Smith	(Turkey) Bahçeşehir Koleji	

== See also ==
- 2021–22 EuroLeague
- 2021–22 EuroCup Basketball
- 2021–22 Basketball Champions League
