= John Petrucelli =

Italian basketball player

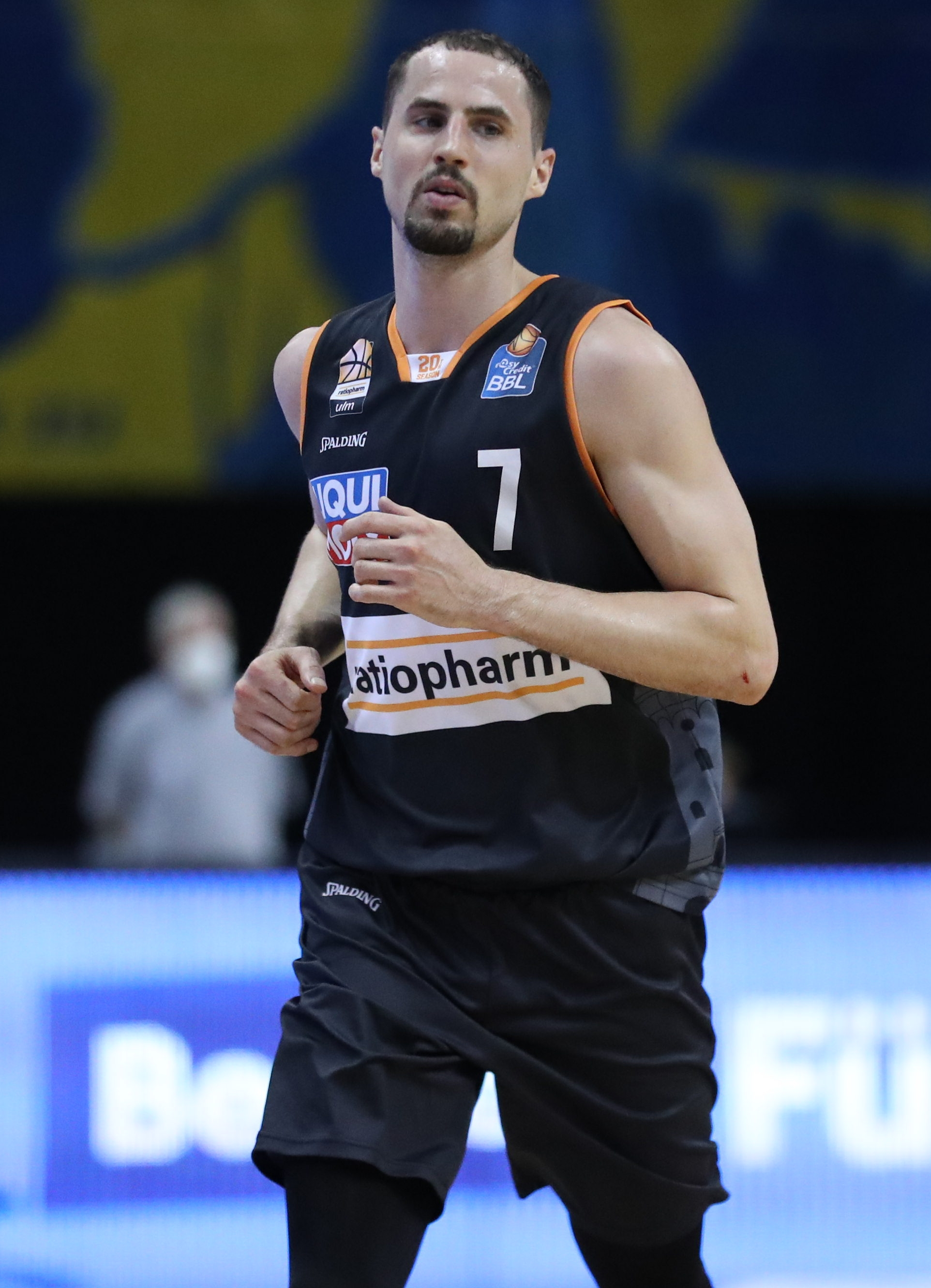

No. 11 – Napoli Basket
- Position: Shooting guard / small forward
- League: LBA; EuroCup

Personal information
- Born: October 27, 1992 (age 34) Hicksville, New York, U.S.
- Listed height: 1.93 m (6 ft 4 in)
- Listed weight: 90 kg (198 lb)

Career information
- High school: Hicksville (Hicksville, New York)
- College: Molloy (2010–2014)
- NBA draft: 2014: undrafted
- Playing career: 2015–present

Career history
- 2015–2016: Iskra Svit
- 2016–2019: Erie BayHawks / Lakeland Magic
- 2019–2020: Hapoel Be'er Sheva
- 2020–2021: ratiopharm Ulm
- 2021–2024: Brescia
- 2024–2025: Trapani Shark
- 2026: Galatasaray
- 2026–present: Napoli Basket

Career highlights
- Italian Cup winner (2023); 2× Lega Serie A Defensive Player of the Year (2023, 2024); ECC Player of the Year (2014); 2× First-team All-ECC (2013, 2014)
- Stats at Basketball Reference

John Petrucelli (born October 27, 1992) is an American-born naturalized Italian professional basketball player for Napoli of the Italian Lega Basket Serie A (LBA) and the EuroCup. He played college basketball for Molloy College before playing professionally in Slovakia, the NBA G League, Israel, Germany, Turkey and Italy.

== Early life and college career ==
Petrucelli attended Hicksville High School in Hicksville, New York, where he earned All-County Accolades in 2009–10. Petrucelli was also named to the All-Conference Team as a junior.

Petrucelli played college basketball at Molloy College, where he averaged 23 points, 7.6 rebounds, 3 assists and 3.6 steals per game in his senior year, leading the Lions to the conference semi-finals round of the playoffs. On March 4, 2014, Petrucelli was named East Coast Conference Player of the Year.

On January 16, 2020, Petrucelli was inducted into Molloy's Athletic Hall of Fame.

== Professional career ==
=== Iskra Svit (2015–2016) ===
On November 1, 2014, Petrucelli was selected in Round 8 with Pick 3 in the 2014 NBA Development League Draft by the Bakersfield Jam. On January 29, 2015, Petrucelli started his professional career with Iskra Svit of the Slovak Basketball League. On November 7, 2015, Petrucelli recorded a career-high 27 points, while shooting 11-of-16 from the field, along with five rebounds, seven assists and three steals in an 81–64 win over Karlovka Bratislava. In 21 games played during the 2015–16 season, he averaged 16.4 points, 5.1 rebounds, 2.6 assists and 1.9 steals per game.

=== Erie BayHawks / Lakeland Magic (2016–2019) ===
On June 6, 2016, Petrucelli was acquired by the Erie BayHawks, the NBA D-League affiliate of the Orlando Magic.

On October 10, 2018, Petrucelli signed with the Orlando Magic, but he was waived two days later after training camp. In 47 games played for the Lakeland Magic during the 2018–19 season, he averaged 12.1 points, 4.1 rebounds, 2.6 assists and 1.7 steals per game, while shooting 45.2 percent from three-point range.

On June 25, 2019, Petrucelli joined the Orlando Magic for the 2019 NBA Summer League.

=== Hapoel Be'er Sheva (2019–2020) ===
On July 16, 2019, Petrucelli signed a one-year deal with Hapoel Be'er Sheva of the Israeli Premier League. Petrucelli averaged 13 points, 3.9 rebounds, 2.5 assists and 2.5 steals per game.

=== Ratiopharm Ulm (2020–2021) ===
On August 3, 2020, Petrucelli signed with ratiopharm Ulm of the German Basketball Bundesliga.

=== Brescia (2021–2024) ===
On July 16, 2021, Petrucelli signed in Italy for Brescia Leonessa of the Italian Lega Basket Serie A (LBA) and EuroCup Basketball.

=== Trapani Shark (2024–2025) ===
On July 1, 2024, he signed with Trapani Shark of the Lega Basket Serie A (LBA).

=== Galatasaray (2026) ===
On January 11, 2026, he signed with Galatasaray MCT Technic of the Turkish Basketbol Süper Ligi (BSL).

=== Napoli Basket (2026–present) ===
On June 1, 2026, he signed with Napoli of the Italian Lega Basket Serie A (LBA).
