= Markel Brown =

American basketball player (born 1992)

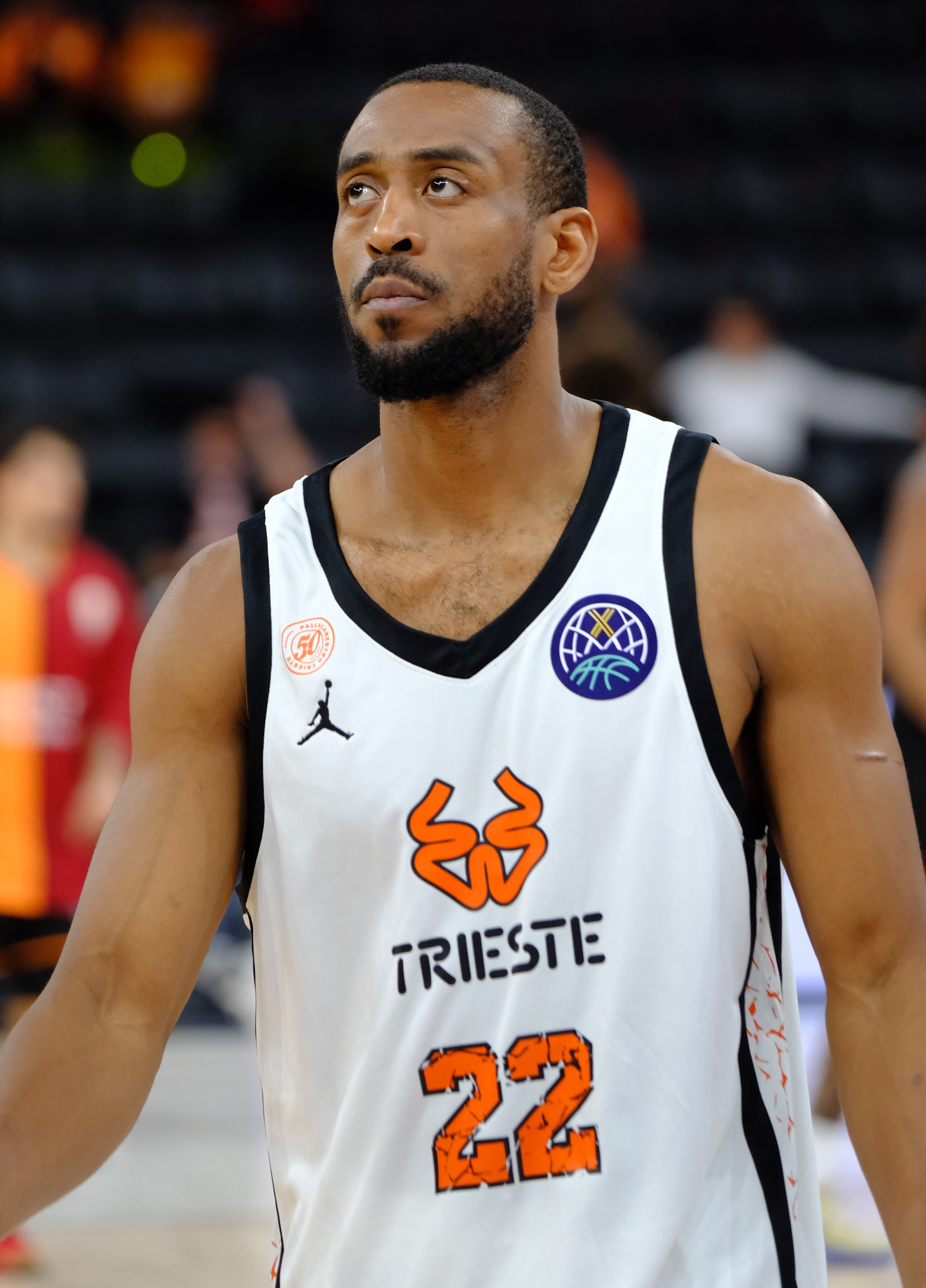
- Brown with Pallacanestro Trieste in 2025

No. 22 – Napoli Basket
- Position: Shooting guard / point guard
- League: LBA; EuroCup

Personal information
- Born: January 29, 1992 (age 34) Alexandria, Louisiana, U.S.
- Listed height: 6 ft 3 in (1.91 m)
- Listed weight: 190 lb (86 kg)

Career information
- High school: Peabody Magnet (Alexandria, Louisiana)
- College: Oklahoma State (2010–2014)
- NBA draft: 2014: 2nd round, 44th overall pick
- Drafted by: Minnesota Timberwolves
- Playing career: 2014–present

Career history
- 2014–2016: Brooklyn Nets
- 2015: →Maine Red Claws
- 2016–2017: Khimki
- 2017–2018: Oklahoma City Blue
- 2018: Houston Rockets
- 2018: →Rio Grande Valley Vipers
- 2018–2019: Darüşşafaka
- 2019–2020: Oklahoma City Blue
- 2020–2021: Hapoel Eilat
- 2021–2022: Antwerp Giants
- 2022–2023: Pallacanestro Varese
- 2023–2024: Napoli Basket
- 2024–2026: Pallacanestro Trieste
- 2026–present: Napoli Basket

Career highlights
- Italian Cup winner (2024); 2× Second-team All-Big 12 (2013, 2014); Louisiana Mr. Basketball (2010)
- Stats at NBA.com
- Stats at Basketball Reference

DeMarious Markel Brown (born January 29, 1992) is an American professional basketball player for Napoli Basket of the Italian Lega Basket Serie A (LBA) and the EuroCup. He played college basketball for the Oklahoma State Cowboys.

== High school career ==
Brown attended Peabody Magnet High School in Alexandria, Louisiana. As a senior, he averaged 32 points, 10 rebounds, five assists, three blocks and three steals per game, going on to be named the 2010 Louisiana Player of the Year and Mr. Basketball by the Louisiana Sports Writers Association.

Considered a three-star recruit by Rivals.com, Brown was listed as the No. 37 shooting guard and the No. 137 player in the nation in 2010.

== College career ==
In his freshman season at Oklahoma State, Brown led the squad with 33 blocked shots, the most ever by a Cowboy guard and the fifth-most ever by a freshman at OSU. In 34 games (10 starts), he averaged 6.4 points, 2.5 rebounds, 1.4 assists and 1.0 blocks in 21.6 minutes per game.

In his sophomore season, he was named the "Dunker of the Year" by CollegeBasketballTalk on NBCSports.com. In 33 games (26 starts), he averaged 10.5 points, 5.1 rebounds, 2.4 assists and 1.2 steals in 31.1 minutes per game.

In his junior season, he was named to the USBWA All-District VI team, NABC All-District 8 second team and All-Big 12 second team. He also became the 37th player in school history to record 1,000 career points, and the second player in school history to record 200 assists, 100 steals and 75 blocked shots in a career, joining Byron Houston. In 33 games (all starts), he averaged 15.3 points, 4.4 rebounds, 2.4 assists and 1.0 steals in 34.1 minutes per game.

In his senior season, he was named to the All-Big 12 second team for the second time in his career. In 34 games (all starts), he averaged 17.2 points, 5.3 rebounds, 2.9 assists, 1.0 steals and 1.0 blocks in 35.3 minutes per game.

== Professional career ==
=== Brooklyn Nets (2014–2016) ===
On June 26, 2014, Brown was selected with the 44th overall pick in the 2014 NBA draft by the Minnesota Timberwolves. He was later traded to the Brooklyn Nets on draft night. He joined the Nets for the 2014 NBA Summer League, and signed with the team on July 23. He played in just seven games for the Nets over the first two months of the 2014–15 season. On January 1, 2015, using the flexible assignment rule, the Nets assigned Brown to the Maine Red Claws, the D-League affiliate of the Boston Celtics. On January 8, he was recalled by the Nets. In his first career start on February 23 against the Denver Nuggets, Brown played 45 minutes of action and recorded a double-double with 10 points and 11 rebounds as he helped the Nets defeat the Nuggets, 110–82. On March 29, he scored a career-high 17 points in a 107–99 win over the Los Angeles Lakers. To finish the regular season, Brown played in 40 games and started in 29 of them. After starting in the Nets' first playoff game, he managed just one more playoff appearance, in Game 6 of their series against the Atlanta Hawks, a series the Nets lost 4–2.

In July 2015, Brown re-joined the Nets for the 2015 NBA Summer League. He lost his starting role for the 2015–16 season, and played sparingly for the Nets throughout the first half of the season. He began seeing regular playing time in January, and scored in double figures five times during February. On March 5, 2016, he scored a career-high 23 points in the Nets' 132–118 loss to the Minnesota Timberwolves.

On September 26, 2016, Brown signed with the Cleveland Cavaliers. However, he was later waived by the Cavaliers on October 20 after appearing in six preseason games.

=== Khimki (2016–2017) ===
On October 25, 2016, Brown signed with Russian club Khimki for the rest of the 2016–17 season.

=== Oklahoma City Blue (2017–2018) ===
On September 24, 2017, Brown signed a training camp contract with the Oklahoma City Thunder. On October 11, 2017, Brown was waived by the Thunder.

=== Houston Rockets (2018) ===
On January 15, 2018, Brown was signed by the Houston Rockets, on a two-way contract, after the Rockets waived Brianté Weber.

=== Darüşşafaka (2018–2019) ===
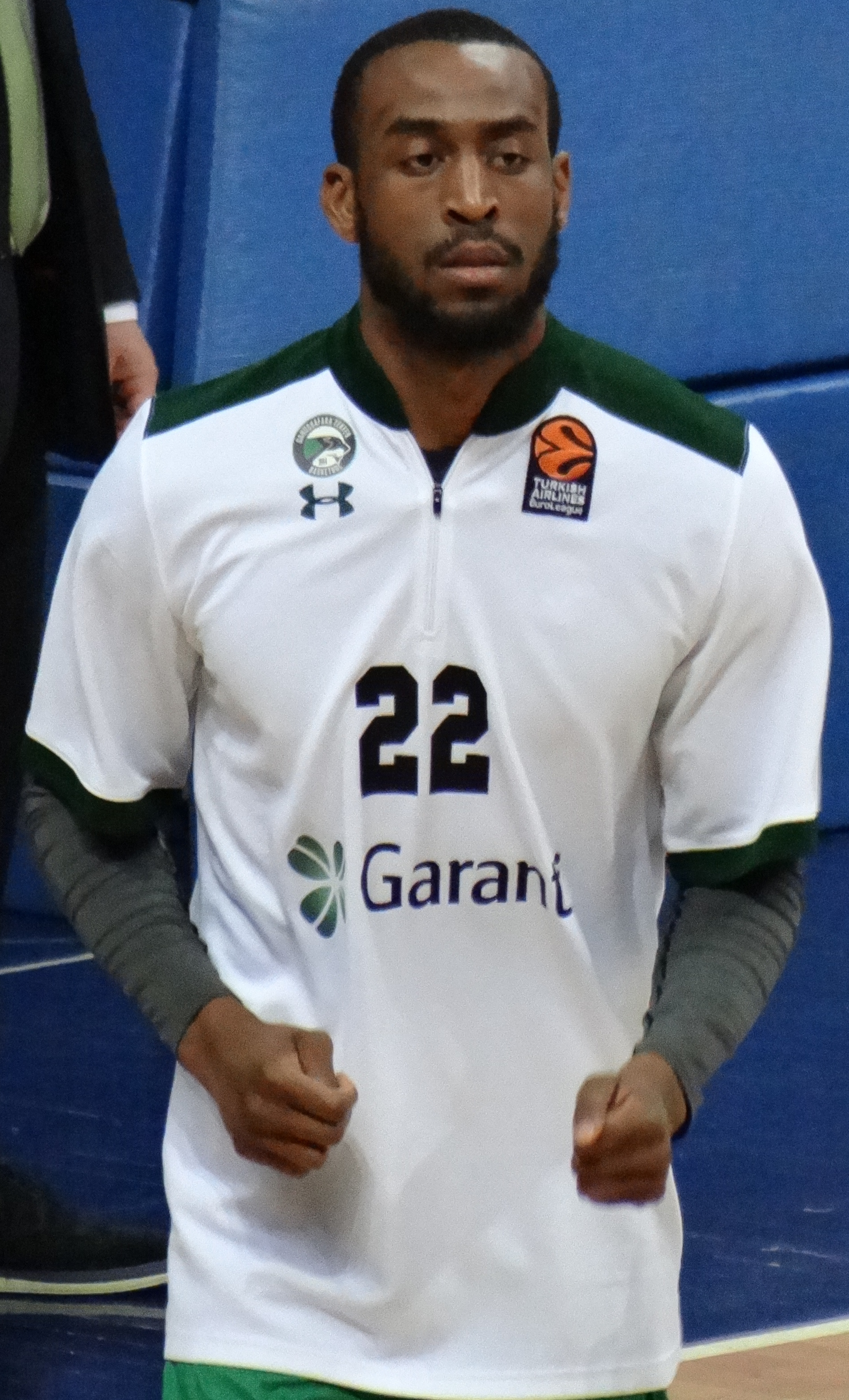
Brown with Darüşşafaka in 2018

On July 24, 2018, Brown signed a one-year deal with the Turkish team Darüşşafaka of the EuroLeague.

=== Oklahoma City Blue (2019–2020) ===
On September 24, 2019, Brown was signed by the Oklahoma City Thunder. On September 27, Brown was once again waived by the Thunder, and then joined the Oklahoma City Blue. Brown missed several games in November with a left ankle injury. On January 10, 2020, Brown recorded 24 points, five rebounds and two assists in a 120–97 win over Raptors 905. He averaged 11.9 points, 3.2 rebounds and 2.8 assists per game with the Blue.

=== Hapoel Eilat (2020–2021) ===
On August 4, 2020, Brown signed with Hapoel Eilat of the Israeli Basketball Premier League.

=== Antwerp Giants (2021–present) ===
On August 11, 2021, Brown signed in Belgium with Antwerp Giants of the BNXT League.

=== Pallacanestro Varese (2022–2023) ===
On July 20, 2022, Brown signed with Pallacanestro Varese of the Lega Basket Serie A (LBA).

=== Napoli Basket (2023–2024) ===
On December 24, 2023, he signed with Napoli Basket of the Italian Lega Basket Serie A (LBA) winning the Italian Cup.

=== Pallacanestro Trieste (2024–2026) ===
On July 17, 2024, he signed with Pallacanestro Trieste of the Italian Lega Basket Serie A (LBA).

=== Return to Napoli Basket (2026–present) ===
On September 4, 2026, Brown signed a one-year deal with Napoli Basketball of the Italian Lega Basket Serie A (LBA).

== NBA career statistics ==
Legend
GP	Games played	GS	Games started	MPG	Minutes per game
FG%	Field goal percentage	3P%	3-point field goal percentage	FT%	Free throw percentage
RPG	Rebounds per game	APG	Assists per game	SPG	Steals per game
BPG	Blocks per game	PPG	Points per game	**Bold**	Career high

=== Regular season ===
Year	Team	GP	GS	MPG	FG%	3P%	FT%	RPG	APG	SPG	BPG	PPG
2014–15	Brooklyn	47	**29**	**16.6**	.362	.266	**.825**	**2.3**	.8	**.7**	**.3**	4.6
2015–16	Brooklyn	**62**	6	15.8	**.394**	**.314**	.755	2.0	**1.5**	.6	.2	**5.9**
2017–18	Houston	4	0	7.8	.286	.200	–	1.3	.5	.0	.0	1.3
Career		113	35	15.9	.380	.295	.781	2.1	1.2	.6	.2	5.2

=== Playoffs ===
Year	Team	GP	GS	MPG	FG%	3P%	FT%	RPG	APG	SPG	BPG	PPG
2015	Brooklyn	2	1	5.0	.400	.000	1.000	1.0	.5	.0	.0	3.0
Career		2	1	5.0	.400	.000	1.000	1.0	.5	.0	.0	3.0

== Personal life ==
Brown is the son of Damian and Antoinette Brown. His grandmother, Jerri Mae Eggins, has been a big influence in his life, as have his two sisters, Tara and Moryia. In 2007, three months after his mother died from a brain aneurysm, his uncle, David Eggins, the closest male he had to a father figure, died trying to rescue two elderly women from a house fire.
