= 2023 Italian Basketball Cup =

Tournament details
- Country: Italy
- City: Turin
- Venue(s): Pala Alpitour
- Dates: 15–19 February 2023
- Teams: 8
- Defending champions: EA7 Emporio Armani Milano

Final positions
- Champions: Germani Brescia
- Runner-up: Virtus Segafredo Bologna

Tournament statistics
- Matches played: 7

Awards
- MVP: (Italy) Amedeo Della Valle

The 2023 Italian Basketball Cup, known as the Frecciarossa Final Eight 2023 for sponsorship reasons, was the 47th edition of Italy's national cup tournament. The competition was managed by the Lega Basket for LBA clubs. The tournament was played from 15 to 19 February 2023 in Turin, Piedmont, at the end of the first half of the 2022–23 LBA season.

Olimpia Milano were the defending champions. Germani Brescia won the cup, defeating Virtus Bologna in the final 84–76.

== Qualification ==
Qualified for the tournament are selected based on their position on the league table at the end of the first half of the 2022–23 LBA regular season.

Pos	Team	Pld	W	L	PF	PA	PD	Qualification
1	EA7 Emporio Armani Milano	15	12	3	1259	1099	+160	Qualified as seeded teams
2	Virtus Segafredo Bologna	15	12	3	1273	1160	+113	Qualified as seeded teams
3	Bertram Derthona Tortona	15	10	5	1214	1142	+72	Qualified as seeded teams
4	Carlegna Prosciutto Pesaro	15	9	6	1322	1259	+63	Qualified as seeded teams
5	Openjobmetis Varese	15	9	6	1406	1365	+41	Qualified as non-seeded teams
6	Dolomiti Energia Trentino	15	8	7	1106	1130	−24	Qualified as non-seeded teams
7	Umana Reyer Venezia	15	8	7	1243	1187	+56	Qualified as non-seeded teams
8	Germani Brescia	15	7	8	1270	1250	+20	Qualified as non-seeded teams

Updated to match(es) played on 10 January 2021. Source: LBA

== Bracket ==
Quarterfinals
1	EA7 Emporio Armani Milano	72
8	Germani Brescia	75
4	Carlegna Prosciutto Pesaro	84
5	Openjobmetis Varese	80
2	Virtus Segafredo Bologna	82
7	Umana Reyer Venezia	68
3	Bertram Derthona Tortona	74
6	Dolomiti Energia Trentino	70

Semifinals
Germani Brescia	74
Carlegna Prosciutto Pesaro	57
Virtus Segafredo Bologna	90
Bertram Derthona Tortona	65

Finals
Germani Brescia	84
Virtus Segafredo Bologna	76

== Quarterfinals ==
=== EA7 Emporio Armani Milano vs. Germani Brescia ===
15 February 2023	EA7 Emporio Armani Milano	72–75	Germani Brescia	Turin
18:00	Scoring by quarter: 19–20, 10–25, 26–11, 17–19
Eleven, Eurosport, Nove	Pts: Baron 18; Rebs: Melli 9 Asts: Luwawu-Cabarrot 4 PIR: Baron 23	Boxscore	Pts: Massinburg 16; Rebs: Nikolić 8 Asts: Della Valle 7 PIR: Massinburg 18	Arena: Pala Alpitour; Referees: Lanzarini, Sahin, Perciavalle

=== Carpegna Prosciutto Pesaro vs. Openjobmetis Varese ===
15 February 2023	Carpegna Prosciutto Pesaro	84–80	Openjobmetis Varese	Turin
20:45	Scoring by quarter: 29–12, 15–23, 23–29, 17–16
Eleven, Eurosport, Nove	Pts: Charalampopoulos 20; Rebs: Kravić 6 Asts: Delfino 4 PIR: Charalampopoulos 23	Boxscore	Pts: Johnson 18; Rebs: Owens 13; Asts: Ross 7 PIR: Owens 27	Arena: Pala Alpitour; Referees: Mazzoni, Borgioni, Gonella

=== Virtus Segafredo Bologna vs. Umana Reyer Venezia ===
16 February 2023	Virtus Segafredo Bologna	82–68	Umana Reyer Venezia	Turin
18:00	Scoring by quarter: 20–22, 14–14, 21–12, 27–20
Eleven, Eurosport, Nove	Pts: Belinelli 21; Rebs: Shengelia 5 Asts: Teodosić 6 PIR: Belinelli 19	Boxscore	Pts: Parks 18; Rebs: Parks 10; Asts: De Nicolao 5 PIR: Parks 21	Arena: Pala Alpitour; Referees: Paternicò, Attard, Giovannetti

=== Bertram Derthona Tortona vs. Dolomiti Energia Trentino ===
16 February 2023	Bertram Derthona Tortona	74–70	Dolomiti Energia Trentino	Turin
20:45	Scoring by quarter: 22–16, 16–20, 21–12, 15–22
Eleven, Eurosport, Nove	Pts: Christon 19; Rebs: Daum 7 Asts: Christon 4 PIR: Christon 19	Boxscore	Pts: Flaccadori 15; Rebs: Udom 7 Asts: Flaccadori 5 PIR: Flaccadori 18	Arena: Pala Alpitour; Referees: Rossi, Martolini, Bettini
