= 2026 Italian Basketball Cup =

Basketball tournament in Italy

Tournament details
- Country: Italy
- City: Turin
- Venue: Pala Alpitour
- Dates: 18–22 February 2026
- Teams: 8
- Defending champions: Dolomiti Energia Trento

Final positions
- Champions: EA7 Emporio Armani Milano
- Runners-up: Bertram Derthona Basket

Tournament statistics
- Matches played: 7

Awards
- MVP: (United States) Armoni Brooks

The 2026 Italian Basketball Cup, known as the Frecciarossa Final Eight 2026 for sponsorship reasons, was the 50th edition of Italy's national cup tournament. The previous winner of the cup was Dolomiti Energia Trento. The competition was managed by the Lega Basket for LBA clubs and the tournament was played from 18 to 22 February 2026 in Turin, Piedmont, at the end of the first half of the 2025–26 LBA season. EA7 Emporio Armani Milano won the competition.

== Bracket ==
Quarterfinals
1	Germani Brescia	78
8	Amici Pallacanestro Udinese	64
4	EA7 Emporio Armani Milano	94
5	Pallacanestro Trieste 2004	86
2	Reyer Venezia	87
7	Bertram Derthona Basket	95
3	Virtus Bologna	83
6	Napoli Basket	73

Semifinals
Germani Brescia	102
EA7 Emporio Armani Milano	106
Bertram Derthona Basket	84
Virtus Bologna	78

Finals
EA7 Emporio Armani Milano	85
Bertram Derthona Basket	77

== Final ==
=== EA7 Emporio Armani Milano vs. Dolomiti Energia Trento ===
22 February 2026	EA7 Emporio Armani Milano	85–77	Bertram Derthona Basket	Turin
17:00 (CET)	Scoring by quarter: 33–18, 14–27, 12–17, 26–15
	Pts: Brooks 20; Rebs: Nebo 11; Asts: Bolmaro 4	Boxscore	Pts: Hubb 23; Rebs: Biligha 7 Asts: Hubb, Vital 4	Arena: Inalpi Arena; Referees: Lanzarini; Rossi; Baldini
