= 2025 Italian Basketball Cup =

National cup basketball tournament

Tournament details
- Country: Italy
- City: Turin
- Venue: Pala Alpitour
- Dates: 12–16 February 2025
- Teams: 8
- Defending champions: GeVi Napoli

Final positions
- Champions: Dolomiti Energia Trento
- Runners-up: EA7 Emporio Armani Milano

Tournament statistics
- Matches played: 7

Awards
- MVP: (United Kingdom) Quinn Ellis

The 2025 Italian Basketball Cup, known as the Frecciarossa Final Eight 2025 for sponsorship reasons, was the 49th edition of Italy's national cup tournament. The previous winner of the cup was Gevi Napoli. The competition was managed by the Lega Basket for LBA clubs and the tournament was played from 12 to 16 February 2025 in Turin, Piedmont, at the end of the first half of the 2024–25 LBA season. Dolomiti Energia Trento won the competition.

== Bracket ==
Quarterfinals
1	Germani Brescia	86
8	Bertram Derthona Tortona	79
4	Virtus Segafredo Bologna	77
5	EA7 Emporio Armani Milano	91
2	Trapani Shark	72
7	Pallacanestro Trieste 2004	74
3	Dolomiti Energia Trento	85
6	UnaHotels Reggio Emilia	80

Semifinals
Germani Brescia	69
EA7 Emporio Armani Milano	74
Pallacanestro Trieste 2004	79
Dolomiti Energia Trento	82

Finals
EA7 Emporio Armani Milano	63
Dolomiti Energia Trento	79

== Final ==
=== EA7 Emporio Armani Milano vs. Dolomiti Energia Trento ===
16 February 2025	EA7 Emporio Armani Milano	63–79	Dolomiti Energia Trento	Turin
18:15	Scoring by quarter: 14–15, 17–23, 17–21, 15–20
	Pts: Mirotic 20; Rebs: Shields 6 Asts: Mannion 4	Boxscore	Pts: Ford 23; Rebs: Zukauskas 9 Asts: Zukauskas 3	Arena: Inalpi Arena; Referees: Attard; Giovannetti; Rossi
