= Lega Basket Serie A Defensive Player of the Year =

The Lega Basket Serie A (LBA) Defensive Player of the Year is an annual basketball award of the LBA. It is awarded to the best defensive player throughout the season, up until the Finals stage of the season.

== Winners ==
Season	Position	Best Defender	Club	Ref.
2018–19	PG	(United States) Aaron Craft	(Italy) Aquila Basket Trento	
2019–20	Not awarded			
2020–21	C	(United States) Kyle Hines	(Italy) Olimpia Milano	
2021–22	C	(United States) Kyle Hines (2×)	(Italy) Olimpia Milano	
2022–23	SG	(Italy) John Petrucelli	(Italy) Germani Brescia	
2023–24	SG	(Italy) John Petrucelli (2x)	(Italy) Germani Brescia	
2024–25	PG	(Italy) Alessandro Pajola	(Italy) Virtus Bologna	
2025–26	PG	(Argentina) Leandro Bolmaro	(Italy) Olimpia Milano	
