= Tyler Ennis (basketball) =

Canadian basketball player (born 1994)

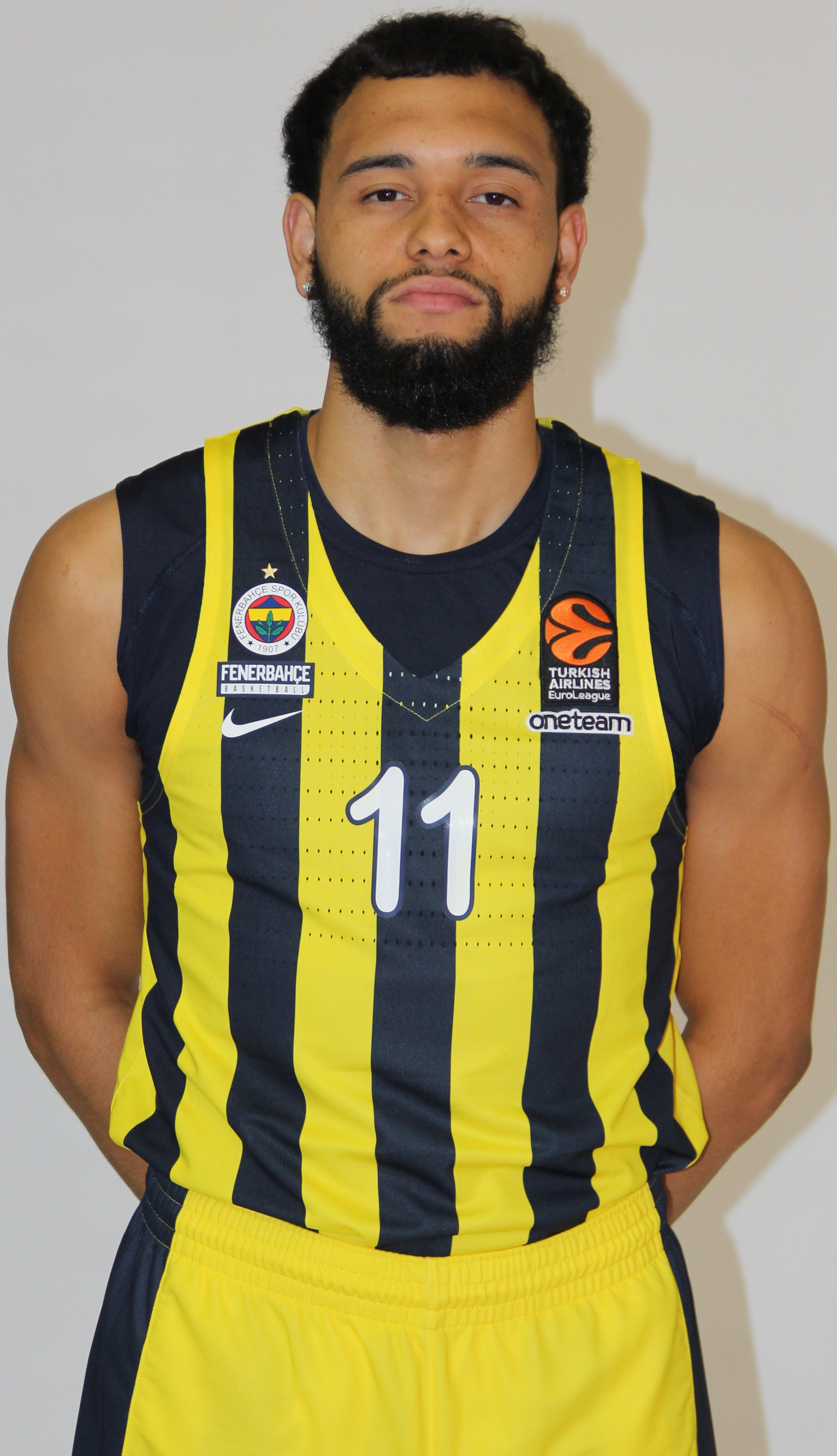
- Ennis with Fenerbahçe in 2018

No. 11 – Hapoel Tel Aviv
- Position: Point guard
- League: Israeli Basketball Premier League; EuroLeague

Personal information
- Born: August 24, 1994 (age 32) Toronto, Ontario, Canada
- Listed height: 1.89 m (6 ft 2 in)
- Listed weight: 88 kg (194 lb)

Career information
- High school: Father Henry Carr Catholic (Toronto, Ontario); St. Benedict's Prep (Newark, New Jersey)
- College: Syracuse (2013–2014)
- NBA draft: 2014: 1st round, 18th overall pick
- Drafted by: Phoenix Suns
- Playing career: 2014–present

Career history
- 2014–2015: Phoenix Suns
- 2014–2015: →Bakersfield Jam
- 2015–2016: Milwaukee Bucks
- 2016–2017: Houston Rockets
- 2017–2018: Los Angeles Lakers
- 2018–2019: Fenerbahçe
- 2019–2020: Raptors 905
- 2020–2022: Türk Telekom
- 2022–2023: Tofaş
- 2023–2024: Napoli Basket
- 2024: Hapoel Tel Aviv
- 2024–2025: Reyer Venezia
- 2025–present: Hapoel Tel Aviv

Career highlights
- Italian Cup winner (2024); LBA assists leader (2024); Second-team All-ACC (2014); ACC All-Freshmen team (2014); ACC All-Defensive team (2014); First-team Parade All-American (2013); Gatorade New Jersey Player of the Year (2012)
- Stats at NBA.com
- Stats at Basketball Reference
Medals
Men's basketball
Representing Canada
FIBA Americas U18 Championship
Bronze medal – third place	2012 Brazil	National team

Tyler Cameron Ennis McIntyre (born August 24, 1994) is a Canadian professional basketball player for Hapoel Tel Aviv of the Israeli Basketball Premier League and the EuroLeague.

He was named the 2013 Gatorade New Jersey Player of the Year. He played college basketball for one year for the Syracuse Orange, where he led the Atlantic Coast Conference in both assists and steals per game, and was considered one of the top freshmen in 2013–14. He was drafted 18th overall by the Phoenix Suns in the 2014 NBA draft. He has played in the NBA for the Suns, Milwaukee Bucks, Houston Rockets, and Los Angeles Lakers.

== Early life and high school career ==
Ennis was born inBrampton, Ontario, a suburb of Toronto, Ontario, Canada. He attended Cardinal Newman Catholic Elementary School in Brampton, Ontario, and Father Henry Carr Catholic Secondary School in Toronto.

He then attended St. Benedict's Preparatory School in Newark, New Jersey. In his junior year in 2011–12, Ennis led St. Benedict's, coached by Mark Taylor, to a school-record 35 victories and the No. 2 ranking in New Jersey. He was named the Gatorade New Jersey Player of the Year after averaging 14.6 points and 7.1 assists per game.

In his senior year in 2012–13, the Gray Bees finished with a record of 31-2 he averaged 20 points, 6.1 assists, 5.2 rebounds, and 3.1 steals per game. Ennis was honored as the Star-Ledger Prep Player of the Year, earned All-Prep First Team recognition, was named a Parade All American First Team, and was named USA Today All-Third Team .

Considered a five-star recruit by ESPN.com, Ennis was listed as the No. 5 point guard and the No. 20 player in the nation in 2013.

== College career ==
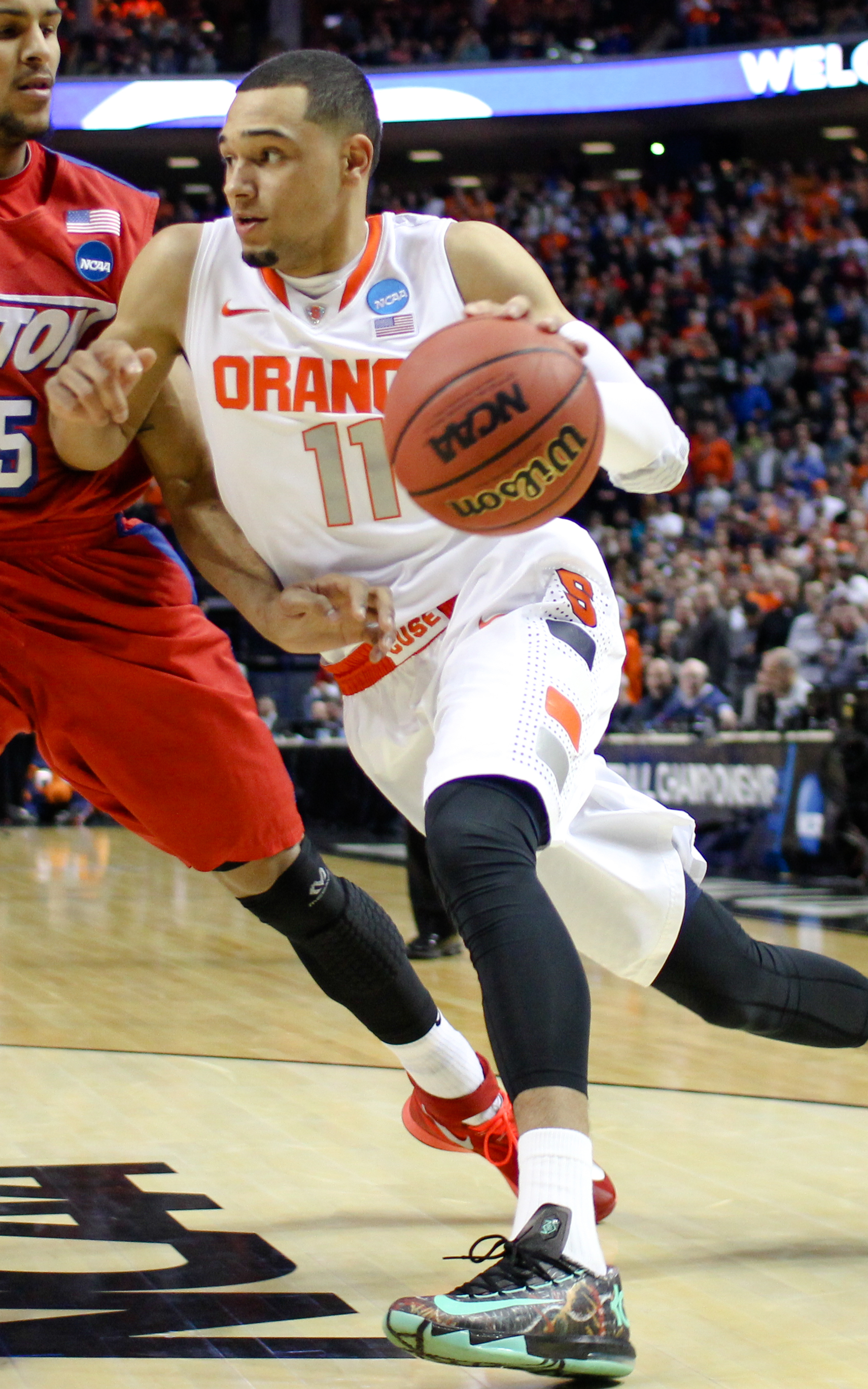
Tyler Ennis driving.

In his freshman season at Syracuse in 2013–14, where he majored in sport management. In 34 games, he averaged 12.9 points, 3.4 rebounds, 5.5 assists, and 2.1 steals in 35.7 minutes per game. He led the Atlantic Coast Conference in both assists and steals, ranked 6th in the country and first among freshmen with a 3.60 assist-to-turnover ratio, and 28th in the country in both assists and steals per game.

Ennis was named to the 2014 All-ACC second team, All-ACC Freshmen Team, All-ACC Defensive Team, USA Today All-American Second Team, and USBWA Freshman All-American Team . On February 28, 2014, Ennis was named one of the ten semi-finalists for the Naismith College Player of the Year.

Ennis helped lead the Syracuse Orange past Western Michigan in the second round of the 2014 NCAA Tournament. He missed a three-pointer at the buzzer of the following game which would have taken Syracuse past Dayton and into the Sweet Sixteen; Ennis had beaten Pittsburgh the prior month with a 40-foot shot at the buzzer.

== Professional career ==
=== Phoenix Suns (2014–2015) ===
On June 26, 2014, Ennis was selected with the 18th overall pick in the 2014 NBA draft by the Phoenix Suns. He later joined the Suns for the 2014 NBA Summer League. On August 8, he signed his rookie scale contract with the Suns.

He made his NBA debut on October 29 in the Suns' season opener against the Los Angeles Lakers, recording two points, three assists, and one block in a 119–99 win. During his rookie season with the Suns, Ennis received multiple assignments to the Bakersfield Jam of the NBA Development League, with whom in 9 games he averaged 33.5 minutes, 18.4 points, 4.3 rebounds, 5.3 assists, and 1.8 steals per game, while shooting 47.9% from the field and 81.0% from the free throw line. With the Suns, in 8 games he averaged 7.3 minutes, 2.8 points, 0.9 rebounds, and 1.8 assists per game.

=== Milwaukee Bucks (2015–2016) ===
On February 19, 2015, Ennis was traded, along with Miles Plumlee, to the Milwaukee Bucks as part of a three-team deal involving the Philadelphia 76ers; as part of the deal, the Bucks also received Michael Carter-Williams from Philadelphia, while Phoenix received Brandon Knight and Kendall Marshall from Milwaukee and Philadelphia received a future first-round pick from Phoenix. The next day, Ennis made his debut for the Bucks, recording four points and two assists off the bench in 89–81 win over the Denver Nuggets. In 2014-15 , in 25 games he averaged 14.1 minutes,4.0 points,1.1 rebounds, and 2.4 assists per game.

On May 19, 2015, Ennis underwent surgery to repair a torn labrum in his right shoulder. In March 2016, he was medically cleared to return to playing basketball.

On March 17, 2016, Ennis recorded career highs of 13 points and five rebounds in the Bucks' 96–86 win over the Memphis Grizzlies. Nine days later, he recorded nine points and a career-high 12 assists in a 115–91 loss to the Charlotte Hornets. For the 2015-16 season, in 46 games he averaged 14.2 minutes, 4.5 points, 1.6 rebounds, and 2.1 assists per game.

=== Houston Rockets (2016–2017) ===
On September 22, 2016, Ennis was traded to the Houston Rockets in exchange for Michael Beasley. For the 2016-17 season, in 315 games he averaged 6.3 minutes,1.9 points and 1.1assists per game.

=== Los Angeles Lakers (2017–2018) ===
On February 23, 2017, Ennis was traded, along with the draft rights to Brad Newley, to the Los Angeles Lakers in exchange for Marcelo Huertas. On April 5, 2017, in his first start of the season, Ennis scored a career-high 19 points in place of injured starter D'Angelo Russell to lead the Lakers to a 102–95 win over the San Antonio Spurs. He surpassed that mark four days later, scoring 20 points in a 110–109 win over the Minnesota Timberwolves. For the 2016-17 season, in 22 games he averaged 17.8 minutes, 7.7 points, 1.2 rebounds, 2.4 assists, and 0.9 steals per game, while shooting 45.1% from the field and 86.4% from the free throw line.

On July 26, 2017, Ennis re-signed with the Lakers.

On December 31, 2017, Ennis scored 20 points in a 148–142 double overtime loss to the Houston Rockets. On April 8, 2018, he scored a career-high 22 points in a 112–97 loss to the Utah Jazz. He shot 9 of 18 from the field, made three steals. and played 28 minutes off the bench. For the 2017-18 season, in 54 games he averaged 12.7 minutes, 4.1 points, 1.8 rebounds, and 1.9 assists per game.

On June 28, 2018, Ennis was waived by the Lakers.

=== Fenerbahçe (2018–2019) ===
On July 19, 2018, Ennis signed a two-year deal with the Turkish club Fenerbahçe. In his first four games, he averaged 12.3 minutes, 6.1 points, and 1.1 rebounds per game. Ennis suffered a severe ankle injury in a game on October 21 and was taken to the hospital. His left tibia (shinbone) was fractured; he had surgery in which a rod was inserted along the length of his tibia from his knee to his ankle, and fastened with five screws. On July 1, 2019, Ennis was released from the Turkish club.

=== Raptors 905 (2019–2020) ===
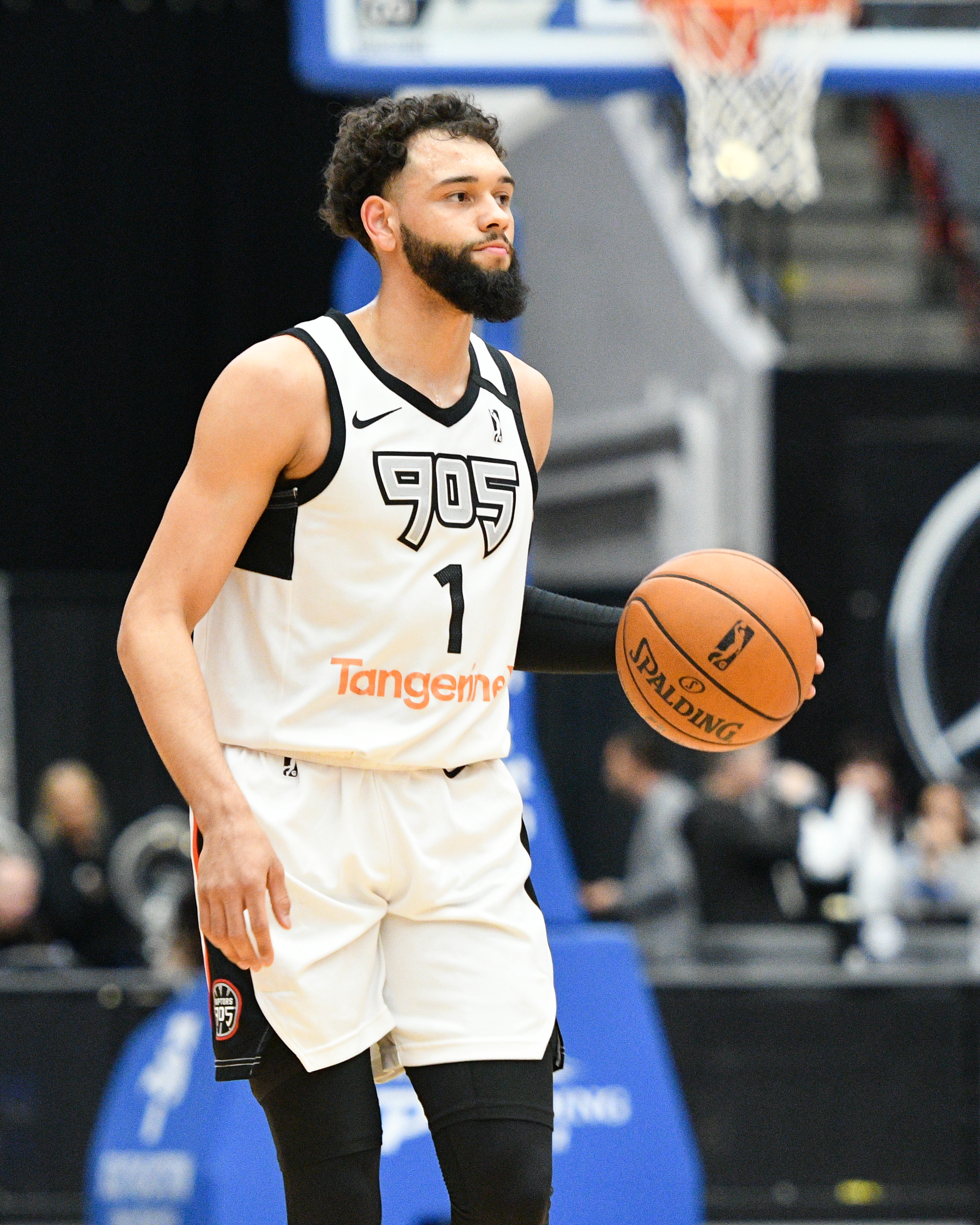
Ennis in 2020

On October 20, 2019, Ennis, who had spent time with four NBA teams, signed with the Toronto Raptors after rehabbing his leg, and was immediately waived. The moves were designed to make Ennis an affiliate player for the organization’s G League team, Raptors 905. On November 20, he had a double-double of 23 points and 12 assists against the Maine Red Claws. On January 18, 2020, Ennis recorded 25 points, 10 assists, three rebounds and one steal in a 106-103 loss to the Canton Charge. In 42 games Ennis averaged 34.2 minutes, 17.1 points, 7.4 assists (6th in the G League), 5.4 rebounds, and 1.7 steals per game, while shooting 86.1% from the free throw line.

=== Turk Telecom (2020–2022) ===
On July 23, 2020, he has signed with Türk Telekom of the Turkish Super League (BSL). He played one game for the team in the 2020-21 season. For the 2021-22 season, before he was injured in 14 games he averaged 23.4 minutes, 10.1 points, 2.5 rebounds,and 3.6 assists per game.

Ennis tore his right Achilles tendon on November 22. He was ruled out for the season.

=== Tofaş (2022–2023) ===
On January 9, 2022, Ennis signed with Tofaş of the Turkish BSL. For the 2022-23 season, in 35 games he averaged 28.9 minutes, 13.1 points, 4.3 rebounds, 4.4 assists, and 1.4 steals per game, while shooting 85.5% from the free throw line.

=== Napoli Basket (2023–2024) ===
On September 3, 2023, he signed with Napoli Basket of the Italian Lega Basket Serie A (LBA). Ennis played in all 30 games that season, averaging 14.1 points, 4.2 rebounds, and a team-high 6.7 assists. Ennis helped Napoli win its first ever Italian Cup, scoring 21 points in the final against Olimpia Milano.

=== Hapoel Tel Aviv (2024) ===
On May 6, 2024, it was announced that Ennis had been signed by Hapoel Tel Aviv of the Israeli Basketball Premier League with fewer than five games to play in the regular season. In 11 games, he averaged 28.8 minutes, 13.8 points, 3.7 rebounds, 4.3 assists, and 1.4 steals per game, while shooting 52.1% from the floor, and 85.7% from the free throw line.

=== Reyer Venezia (2024–2025) ===
On June 18, 2024, he signed with Reyer Venezia of the Italian Lega Basket Serie A (LBA). On February 6, 2025, Ennis was named Most Valuable Player of Round 18 of the 2024-2025 BKT EuroCup Regular Season. He had 19 points and 7 assists in a home win. In 42 games, he averaged 29.5 minutes, 14.2 points, 3.2 rebounds, 5.1 assists, and 0.9 steals per game, while shooting 52.0% from the floor, 43.6% from three-point range, and 82.9% from the free throw line.

=== Return to Hapoel Tel Aviv (2025–present) ===
On July 1, 2025, he signed with Hapoel Tel Aviv of the Israeli Israeli Basketball Premier League for a second stint. For the 2025-26 season, in 13 games he averaged 16.0 minutes, 8.3 points, 1.7 rebounds, and 2.3 assists per game, while shooting 46.3% from the floor, 42.9% from three-point range, and 82.6% from the free throw line.

On January 6, 2026, Ennis suffered a torn left Achilles tendon during his team's win. It as the second Achilles tendon tear for him. He previously tore his Achilles tendon during the 2020-21 season.

On April 16, 2026, the team decided to keep Ennis on the roster for the 2026-27 season despite his suffering his serious injury during the season, and to continue to support him during his recovery.

== National team career ==
Ennis played for the Canadian men's national basketball team at the 2012 FIBA Americas Under-18 Championship, winning a bronze medal, and at the 2013 FIBA Under-19 World Championship, leading the tournament in scoring with 20.9 points per game. In the 2012 tournament, he was a teammate of fellow college standout and eventual #1 pick of the 2014 NBA draft, Andrew Wiggins.

== Career statistics ==
Legend
GP	Games played	GS	Games started	MPG	Minutes per game
FG%	Field-goal percentage	3P%	3-point field-goal percentage	FT%	Free-throw percentage
RPG	Rebounds per game	APG	Assists per game	SPG	Steals per game
BPG	Blocks per game	PPG	Points per game	PIR	Performance index rating
**Bold**	Career high

=== NBA ===
==== Regular season ====
Year	Team	GP	GS	MPG	FG%	3P%	FT%	RPG	APG	SPG	BPG	PPG
2014–15	Phoenix	8	0	7.3	.429	.333	**1.000**	.9	1.8	.0	**.3**	2.8
2014–15	Milwaukee	25	1	14.1	.350	.270	.600	1.1	**2.4**	.7	.1	4.0
2015–16	Milwaukee	46	7	14.2	.449	.333	.735	1.6	2.1	.5	.0	4.5
2016–17	Houston	31	0	6.3	.391	.375	.667	.6	1.1	.2	.0	1.9
2016–17	L.A. Lakers	22	2	**17.8**	**.451**	**.389**	.864	1.2	**2.4**	**.9**	.1	**7.7**
2017–18	L.A. Lakers	**54**	**11**	12.6	.420	.250	.759	**1.8**	1.9	.6	.2	4.1
Career		186	21	12.6	.419	.317	.768	1.3	1.9	.5	.1	4.2

==== Playoffs ====
Year	Team	GP	GS	MPG	FG%	3P%	FT%	RPG	APG	SPG	BPG	PPG
2015	Milwaukee	1	0	16.0	.222	.200	–	4.0	3.0	.0	.0	5.0
Career		1	0	16.0	.222	.200	–	4.0	3.0	.0	.0	5.0

=== EuroLeague ===
Year	Team	GP	GS	MPG	FG%	3P%	FT%	RPG	APG	SPG	BPG	PPG	PIR
2018–19	Fenerbahçe	3	0	10.2	.778	1.000	.667	.7	1.0	.3	.0	6.3	6.7
Career		3	0	10.2	.778	1.000	.667	.7	1.0	.3	.0	6.3	6.7

=== College ===
Year	Team	GP	GS	MPG	FG%	3P%	FT%	RPG	APG	SPG	BPG	PPG
2013–14	Syracuse	34	34	35.7	.411	.353	.765	3.4	5.5	2.1	.2	12.9

== Personal life ==
Ennis is the son of Tony McIntyre and Suzette Ennis McIntyre. He has six siblings: Brandon, Dylan, Brittany, Dominique, Tyylon, and Bryyson. His father works full-time as Director of Basketball Operations at the Athlete Institute in Orangeville, Ontario, and helped create Ontario's CIA Bounce AAU program in 2004. His brother, Dylan Ennis, played college basketball for Oregon and Villanova. Ennis' family has Jamaican heritage. Ennis also played lacrosse as a child, where he was teammates with current Columbus Blue Jackets forward Sean Monahan.

== See also ==
- List of Canadians in the National Basketball Association
