= 2022 Italian Basketball Cup =

Tournament details
- Country: Italy
- City: Pesaro
- Venue(s): Vitrifrigo Arena
- Dates: 16–20 February 2022
- Teams: 8
- Defending champions: AX Armani Exchange Milano

Final positions
- Champions: AX Armani Exchange Milano
- Runner-up: Bertram Derthona Tortona
- Semifinalists: Virtus Segafredo Bologna; Germani Basket Brescia

Tournament statistics
- Matches played: 7

Awards
- MVP: (United States) Malcolm Delaney (AX Armani Exchange Milano)

The 2022 Italian Basketball Cup, known as the Frecciarossa Final Eight 2022 for sponsorship reasons, was the 46th edition of Italy's national cup tournament. The competition is managed by the Lega Basket for LBA clubs. The tournament was played from 10 to 16 February 2022 in Pesaro, at the end of the first half of the 2021–22 LBA season.
