= Tariq Owens =

American basketball player (born 1995)

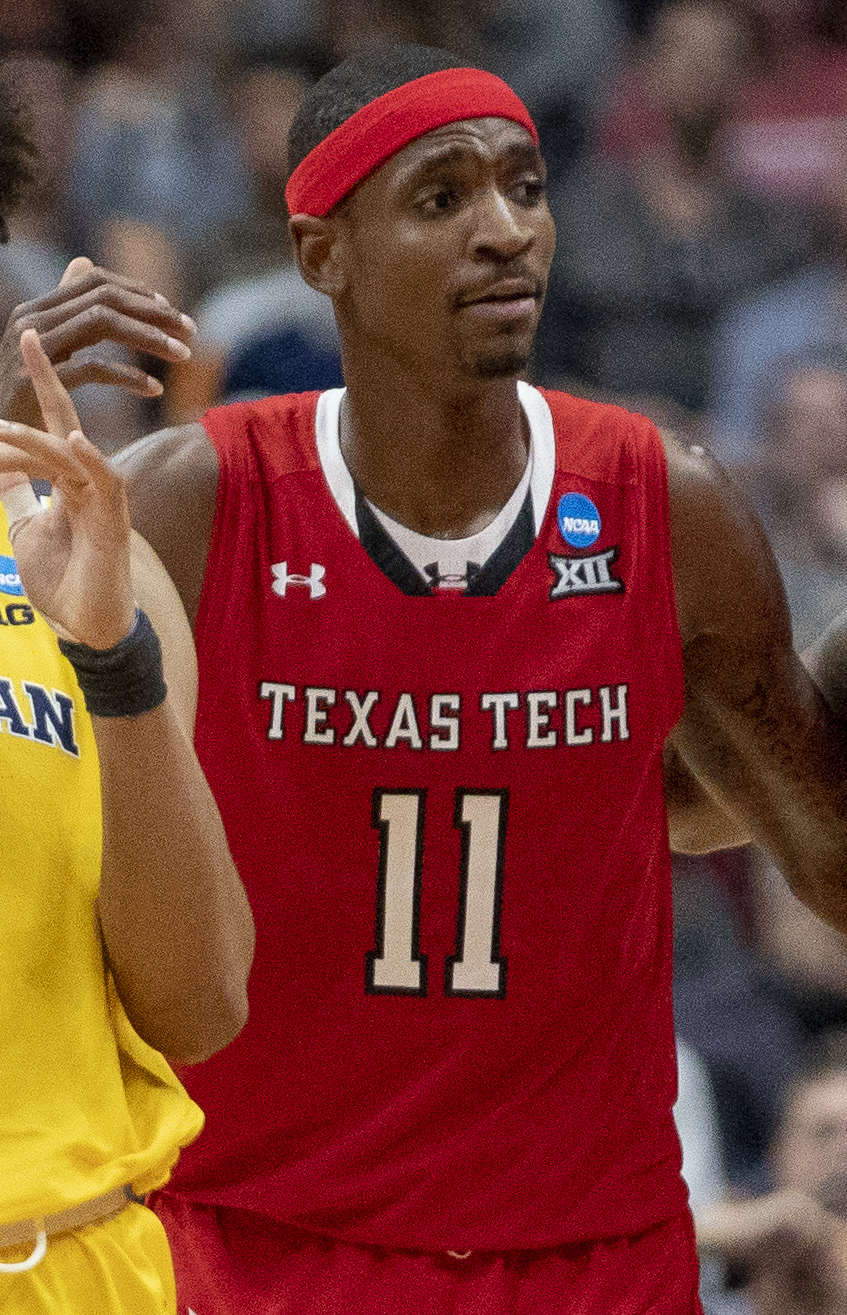
- Owens with the Texas Tech Red Raiders in 2019

No. 41 – Elitzur Netanya
- Position: Power forward
- League: Israeli Premier League

Personal information
- Born: June 30, 1995 (age 31) Utica, New York, U.S.
- Listed height: 6 ft 9 in (2.06 m)
- Listed weight: 205 lb (93 kg)

Career information
- High school: St. Vincent Pallotti (Laurel, Maryland); Mt. Zion Prep (Baltimore, Maryland)
- College: Tennessee (2014–2015); St. John's (2016–2018); Texas Tech (2018–2019)
- NBA draft: 2019: undrafted
- Playing career: 2019–present

Career history
- 2019–2020: Northern Arizona Suns
- 2020: Phoenix Suns
- 2020: →Northern Arizona Suns
- 2021: Long Island Nets
- 2022–2023: Pallacanestro Varese
- 2023–2024: Napoli Basket
- 2024–2025: Vanoli Cremona
- 2025: Sagesse Club
- 2025–2026: JDA Dijon
- 2026-present day: Elitzur Netanya

Career highlights
- Italian Cup winner (2024); Big 12 All-Defensive team (2019)
- Stats at NBA.com
- Stats at Basketball Reference

Tariq Amir Owens (born June 30, 1995) is an American professional basketball player for Elitzur Netanya of the National League. He played college basketball for the Texas Tech Red Raiders and St. John's having transferred after his freshman year at Tennessee.

== Early life ==
Owens mother died of pancreatic cancer when he was 14 years old. Owens attended St. Vincent Pallotti High School, where he was coached by Shae Johnson. He was teammates with future Clemson player Marcquise Reed. Owens spent a postgraduate year at Mount Zion Prep. He originally signed with Ohio but was released after a coaching change.

== College career ==
Owens began his collegiate career at Tennessee, playing for one season before transferring to St. John's. He averaged 5.2 points and 5.2 rebounds per game as a sophomore. As a junior at St. John's, Owens averaged 8.4 points, 5.9 rebounds and a Big East Conference-best 2.8 blocks per game. Following the season, Owens opted to transfer as a graduate student, selecting Texas Tech over an offer from Maryland.

Owens scored 18 points in a 78–63 win over USC on November 20, 2018. As a senior at Texas Tech, Owens averaged 8.7 points, 5.8 rebounds and 2.4 blocks per game. He helped lead the Red Raiders to the 2019 NCAA Men's Basketball Championship game. Owens was named to the Big 12 Conference All-Defensive Team and honorable mention All-Big 12.

== Professional career ==
=== Northern Arizona Suns (2019–2020) ===
After going undrafted in the 2019 NBA draft, Owens did not play in the NBA Summer League but suited up for the Phoenix Suns. On July 18, 2019, Owens signed an Exhibit 10 contract with the Suns. but was waived on October 15. He was named to the roster of the Suns’ NBA G League affiliate, the Northern Arizona Suns. Owens had a double-double with 14 points and 15 rebounds in a 117–113 loss to the Texas Legends on November 12. On January 5, 2020, Owens led the team in scoring with 18 points to go with nine rebounds, one assist, one steal and one block across in a 101–93 victory over the Rio Grande Valley Vipers, helping snap a 13-game losing streak for Northern Arizona.

=== Phoenix Suns (2020) ===
On January 15, 2020, the Phoenix Suns announced that they had signed Owens to a two-way contract. In his NBA debut on February 2, Owens scored two points and grabbed two rebounds in a 129–108 loss to the Milwaukee Bucks.

=== Long Island Nets (2021–2022) ===
On January 27, 2021, Owens was included in the roster of the Long Island Nets, who mentioned that the returning right to Owens had been acquired from the Northern Arizona Suns along with returning right to Matt Farrell in exchange to returning rights to Joe Cremo and Drew Gordon earlier during off-season trades.

=== Pallacanestro Varese (2022–2023) ===
On July 19, 2022, he has signed with Pallacanestro Varese of the Lega Basket Serie A (LBA).

=== Napoli Basket (2023–2024) ===
On July 27, 2023, he signed with Napoli Basket of the Italian Lega Basket Serie A (LBA).

=== Vanoli Cremona (2024–2025) ===
On August 3, 2024, he signed with Vanoli Cremona of the Italian Lega Basket Serie A (LBA).

=== Sagesse Club (2025) ===
On May 29, 2025, he signed with Sagesse Club of the Lebanese Basketball League (LBL).

=== JDA Dijon (2025–present) ===
On July 24, 2025, he signed with JDA Dijon of the LNB Pro A.

== Career statistics ==
Legend
| GP | Games played | GS | Games started | MPG | Minutes per game |
| FG% | Field goal percentage | 3P% | 3-point field goal percentage | FT% | Free throw percentage |
| RPG | Rebounds per game | APG | Assists per game | SPG | Steals per game |
| BPG | Blocks per game | PPG | Points per game | **Bold** | Career high |

=== NBA ===
| Year | Team | GP | GS | MPG | FG% | 3P% | FT% | RPG | APG | SPG | BPG | PPG |
|---|---|---|---|---|---|---|---|---|---|---|---|---|
| 2019–20 | Phoenix | 3 | 0 | 5.0 | .200 | .000 | 1.000 | 1.0 | .0 | .3 | .0 | 1.3 |
| Career | | 3 | 0 | 5.0 | .200 | .000 | 1.000 | 1.0 | .0 | .3 | .0 | 1.3 |

=== College ===
| Year | Team | GP | GS | MPG | FG% | 3P% | FT% | RPG | APG | SPG | BPG | PPG |
|---|---|---|---|---|---|---|---|---|---|---|---|---|
| 2014–15 | Tennessee | 28 | 5 | 7.6 | .353 | .000 | .526 | 1.1 | .1 | .2 | .5 | 1.2 |
| 2015–16 | St. John's | Redshirt | | | | | | | | | | |
| 2016–17 | St. John's | 32 | 8 | 18.8 | .504 | .000 | .750 | 5.2 | .5 | **.6** | 2.2 | 5.2 |
| 2017–18 | St. John's | 33 | 26 | **30.3** | .504 | **.324** | .690 | **5.9** | .5 | **.6** | **2.8** | 8.4 |
| 2018–19 | Texas Tech | **38** | **37** | 25.4 | **.611** | .250 | **.780** | 5.8 | **.7** | .5 | 2.4 | **8.7** |
| Career | | 131 | 76 | 21.2 | .533 | .282 | .725 | 4.7 | .5 | .5 | 2.0 | 6.2 |
