= Reyer Venezia =

Umana Reyer Venezia
- Nickname: Orogranata
- Leagues: LBA; EuroCup
- Founded: 1925; 101 years ago
- Arena: Palasport Giuseppe Taliercio
- Capacity: 3,509
- Location: Venice, Italy
- Team colors: Garnet Red, Gold, White
- President: Federico Casarin
- Head coach: Neven Spahija
- Ownership: Luigi Brugnaro
- Championships: 1 FIBA Europe Cup; 4 Italian Leagues; 1 Italian Cup
- Website: reyer.it
Home	Away

S.S.P. Reyer Venezia Mestre, commonly known as Reyer Venezia or simply Reyer, is an Italian professional basketball club that is based in Venice, Veneto. The club currently plays in the Lega Basket Serie A (LBA), the highest tier of basketball in Italy, and in the EuroCup. Reyer operates both men's and women's professional teams, both playing in their respective first divisions as of the 2017–18 season. The men's team has been crowned the Italian champions four times, as they won the LBA in 1942, 1943, 2017 and 2019.

== History ==
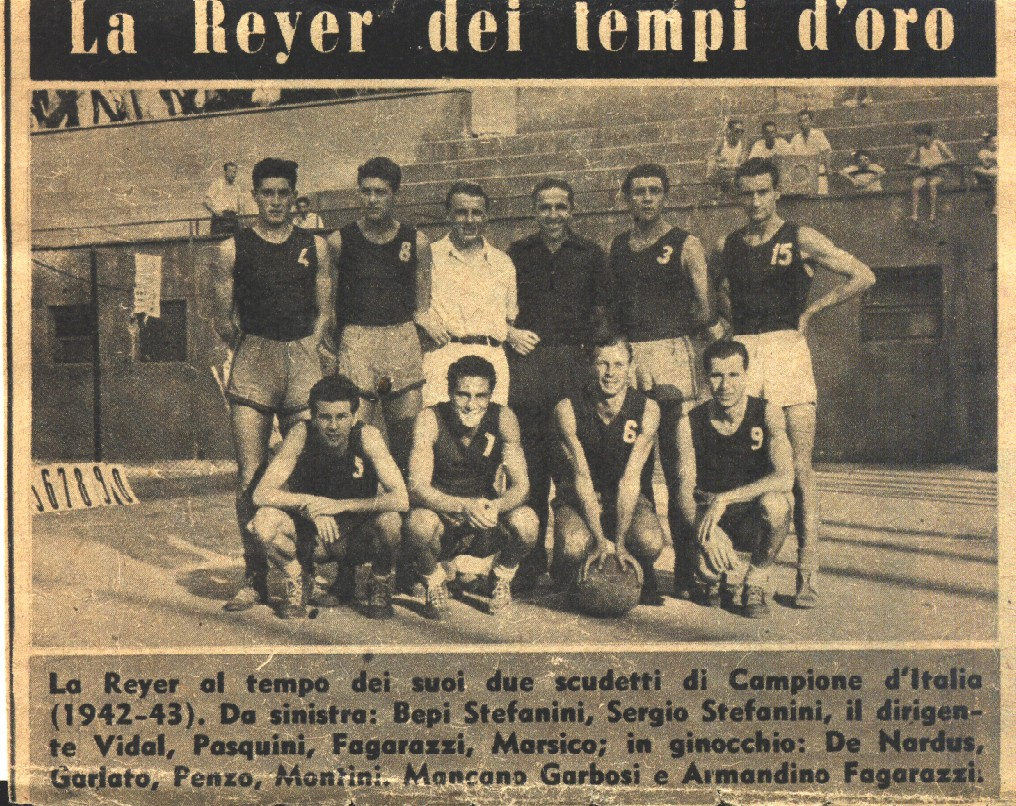
The Reyer team that won league titles in 1942 and 1943

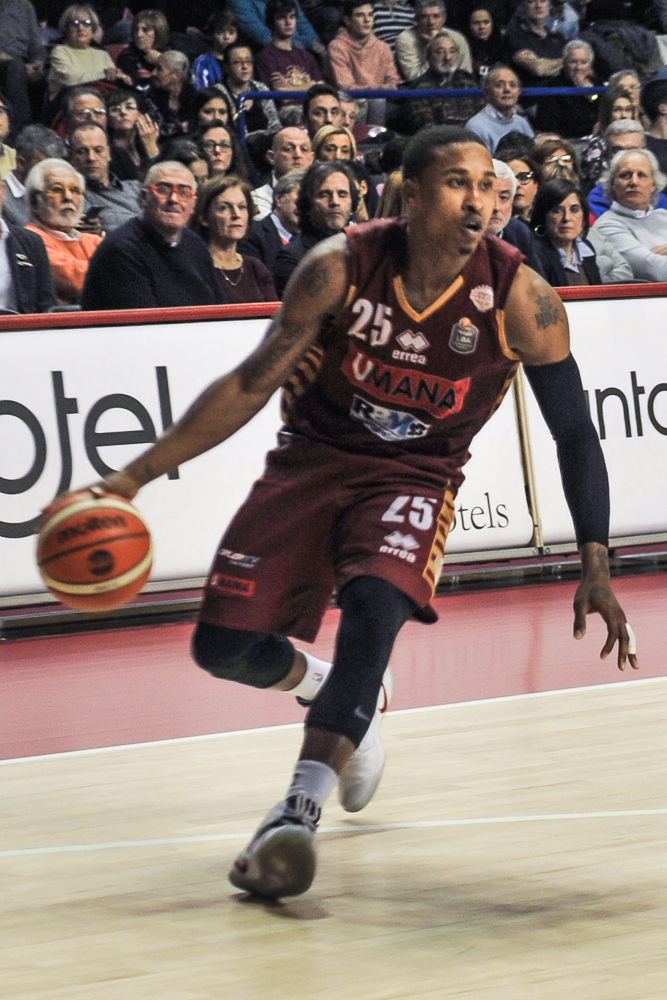
Tyrus McGee playing for Venezia

The team was founded in 1872 as gymnastics club Società Sportiva Costantino Reyer, by the gymnastics teacher Peter Gallo in Venice. The basketball section was founded in 1925. In the 1941–42 and 1942–43 season, Reyer won back-to-back Italian league titles. In 1944, the team also won the Italian championship, but the victory was not approved by the Italian Federation.

The club, under the name Carrera Venezia, participated in the 1980–81 FIBA Korać Cup and managed to reach the final where the club was defeated 104–105 by Joventut Freixenet that took place in Palau Blaugrana, Barcelona at March 19.

In 2006–07, Reyer was the amateur champion of Italy, and promoted to the LegaDue. In the 2010–11 season, the team finally promoted back to the Lega Basket Serie A.

In the 2016–17 season, Reyer reached the LBA Finals for the first time since 1944. Reyer claimed its third national championship on 20 June 2017, after beating Trento 4–2 in the series. Reyer also played in the Basketball Champions League that season and advanced to the Final Four, where the team finished in fourth place.

In the 2017–18 season, coming off of its national championship, Venezia participated in its second straight Champions League season. In Group C, Reyer finished in the sixth-place after holding an 8–6 record. The team was transferred to the FIBA Europe Cup for the play-offs, where it beat Egis Körmend, Nizhny Novgorod and Donar in order to reach the Finals. In the Finals, Reyer faced fellow Italian side Sidigas Avellino. Reyer won the finals 158–148 on aggregate, and on 2 May 2018 the club won the FIBA Europe Cup, its first ever European trophy.

On 22 June 2019 Umana Reyer Venezia won their 4th Italian league title by beating Banco di Sardegna Sassari in game 7 of the LBA finals.

On 16 February 2020 Venezia went to win its first Italian Cup ever by beating Happy Casa Brindisi 73–67 in the Finals in the Adriatic Arena of Pesaro.

== Honours ==
Total titles: 6

=== Domestic competitions ===
- Italian League

Winners (4): 1941–42, 1942–43, 2016–17, 2018–19
Runners-up (2): 1945–46, 2025-26

- Italian Cup

Winners (1): 2019–20

- Italian Supercup

Runners-up (3): 2017, 2019, 2026

=== European competitions ===
- FIBA Korać Cup (defunct)

Runners-up (1): 1980–81

- FIBA Europe Cup

Winners (1): 2017–18

Other Competitions

- Ezio Varisco Cup (defunct)

Winners (1): 1943

- Mairano Cup (defunct)

Winners (1): 1948

== Players ==
=== Current roster ===
Note: Flags indicate national team eligibility at FIBA-sanctioned events. Players may hold other non-FIBA nationalities not displayed.

Umana Reyer Venezia roster
Players
Coaches

Pos.	No.	Nat.	Name	Ht.	Wt.	Age
C	00	(Italy)	Tessitori, Amedeo	2.08 m (6 ft 10 in)	97 kg (214 lb)	32 – 7 October 1994
F	1	(Italy)	Maretto, Octavio	1.98 m (6 ft 6 in)	85 kg (187 lb)	22 – 7 April 2004
PG	5	(Italy)	De Nicolao, Giovanni	1.87 m (6 ft 2 in)	79 kg (174 lb)	30 – 10 June 1996
PG	7	(Italy)	Candi, Leonardo	1.90 m (6 ft 3 in)	86 kg (190 lb)	29 – 30 March 1997
PG	8	(United States)	Bowman, Ky	1.85 m (6 ft 1 in)	85 kg (187 lb)	29 – 16 June 1997
SG	10	(United States)	Rice, Sir'Jabari	1.93 m (6 ft 4 in)	82 kg (181 lb)	27 – 28 December 1998
F/C	13	(Canada)	Boakye, Enoch	2.11 m (6 ft 11 in)	113 kg (249 lb)	23 – 24 March 2003
PF	14	(Georgia (country))	Janelidze, Giga	2.01 m (6 ft 7 in)	90 kg (198 lb)	31 – 3 April 1995
F	19	(Germany)	Olinde, Louis	2.05 m (6 ft 9 in)	82 kg (181 lb)	28 – 19 March 1998
PF	22	(United States)	Parks, Jordan	2.03 m (6 ft 8 in)	96 kg (212 lb)	32 – 6 April 1994
PG	30	(United States)	Watson Jr., Glynn	1.83 m (6 ft 0 in)	74 kg (163 lb)	29 – 9 March 1997
F	33	(Canada)	Wiltjer, Kyle	2.08 m (6 ft 10 in)	109 kg (240 lb)	34 – 20 October 1992
SF	44	(Italy)	Grant, Sasha	2.01 m (6 ft 7 in)	95 kg (209 lb)	24 – 15 February 2002

Head coach

- (Croatia) Neven Spahija

Assistant coach(es)

- (Italy) Emanuele Molin
- (Croatia) Veljko Perović
- (Italy) Alberto Billio

Legend

- (C) Team captain
- Injured

- Roster
Updated: July 24, 2026

=== Depth chart ===
Pos.	Starting 5	Bench 1	Bench 2
C	Amedeo Tessitori	Enoch Boakye
PF	Jordan Parks	Kyle Wiltjer
SF	Louis Olinde	Sasha Grant	Octavio Maretto
SG	Sir'Jabari Rice	Ky Bowman
PG	Glynn Watson Jr.	Leonardo Candi	Giovanni De Nicolao

(colours: Italian or homegrown players; foreign players; young players)

=== Notable players ===
Note: Flags indicate national team eligibility at FIBA-sanctioned events. Players may hold other non-FIBA nationalities not displayed.

Criteria

To appear in this section a player must have either:

- Set a club record or won an individual award while at the club
- Played at least one official international match for their national team at any time
- Played at least one official NBA match at any time.

- (Italy) Gabriele Vianello (1956–57; 1967–72)
- (Socialist Federal Republic of Yugoslavia) Nemanja Đurić (1967–68)
- (United States) Steve Hawes (1972–74)
- (United States) Neal Walk (1977–78)
- (United States) Joe DeSantis (1979–80)
- (United States) Scott Lloyd (1979–80)
- (Socialist Federal Republic of Yugoslavia) Dražen Dalipagić (1980–81; 1985–88)
- (United States) Spencer Haywood (1980–81)
- (United States) Bruce Seals (1981–82)
- (United States) Sidney Wicks (1981–82)
- (Socialist Federal Republic of Yugoslavia) Ratko Radovanović (1986–90)
- (United States) Steve Burtt (1995–96)
- (Latvia) Kristaps Janičenoks (2008–10)
- (United States) Alvin Young (2010–13)
- (France) Yakhouba Diawara (2012–13)
- (Croatia) Hrvoje Perić (2013–2018)
- (Italy) Tomas Ress (2014–2018)
- (United States) (Greece) Mike Bramos (2015–2023)
- (Canada) (Nigeria) Melvin Ejim (2016–2017)
- (United States) (Georgia (country)) MarQuez Haynes (2016–2019)
- (Uruguay) Esteban Batista (2017)
- (Lithuania) Gediminas Orelik (2017–2018)
- (Argentina) / (Italy) Bruno Cerella (2017–2022)
- (Lithuania) Martynas Echodas (2021–2022)
- (United Kingdom) (United States) Tarik Phillip (2021–2022)
- (The Gambia) / (United States) Ousman Krubally
- (United States) (Israel) Max Heidegger (2024)
- (Canada) Tyler Ennis (2024–2025)
- (United States) Xavier Munford (2024–2025)

== Season by season ==
Season	Tier	League	Pos.	Italian Cup	European competitions	
2010–11	2	LegaDue	2nd			
2011–12	1	Serie A	7th			
2012–13	1	Serie A	8th			
2013–14	1	Serie A	11th			
2014–15	1	Serie A	4th	Quarterfinalist		
2015–16	1	Serie A	4th	Quarterfinalist	2 Eurocup	L32
2016–17	1	LBA	1st	Quarterfinalist	3 Champions League	4th
2017–18	1	LBA	3rd	Quarterfinalist	3 Champions League	RS
2017–18	1	LBA	3rd	Quarterfinalist	4 FIBA Europe Cup	C
2018–19	1	LBA	1st	Quarterfinalist	3 Champions League	T16
2019–20	1	LBA	7th	Champion	2 EuroCup	QF
2020–21	1	LBA	4th	Quarterfinalist	2 Eurocup	RS
2021–22	1	LBA	6th		2 Eurocup	EF
2022–23	1	LBA	4th	Quarterfinalist	2 Eurocup	EF
2023–24	1	LBA	4th	Quarterfinalist	2 Eurocup	RS
2024–25	1	LBA	8th		2 Eurocup	EF
2025–26	1	LBA		Quarterfinalist	2 Eurocup	EF

Source: Eurobasket.com

== Head coaches ==
- 1940–1946: (Italy) Vidal Carmelo
- 1948–1951: (Italy) Amerigo Penzo
- 1951–1953: (Italy) Enrico Garbosi
- 1953–1955: (Italy) Egidio Marsico
- 1955–1956: (Italy) Enrico Garbosi
- 1956–1957: (Italy) Giulio Geroli
- 1958–1959: (Italy) Egidio Marsico
- 1959–1960: (Italy) Giulio Geroli
- 1964–1971: (Italy) Giulio Geroli
- 1971–1979: (Italy) Tonino Zorzi
- 1979–1980: (Italy) Giuseppe Guerrieri
- 1980–1981: (Italy) Tonino Zorzi
- 1981–1982: (Italy) Waldi Medeot
- 1982–1983: (Socialist Federal Republic of Yugoslavia) Aca Nikolić
- 1983–1985: (Italy) Waldi Medeot
- 1985–1987: (Italy) Tonino Zorzi
- 1987–1988: (Socialist Federal Republic of Yugoslavia) Petar Skansi
- 1988–1990: (Italy) Marco Calamai
- 1990–1991: (United States) (Italy) Andy Russo
- 1991–1993: (Italy) Mario De Sisti
- 1993–1996: (Italy) Francesco Vitucci
- 1997–2006: (Italy) Costantini Sales e Rubini
- 2008: (Italy) Eugenio Dalmasson
- 2008: (Italy) Stefano Bizzozi
- 2009: (Italy) Sandro Dell'Agnello
- 2009–2013: (Italy) Andrea Mazzon
- 2013–2014: (North Macedonia) (Italy) Zare Markovski
- 2014–2016: (Italy) Carlo Recalcati
- 2016–2023: (Italy) Walter De Raffaele
- 2023–present: (Croatia) Neven Spahija

== Sponsorship names ==
Throughout the years, due to sponsorship, the club has been known as :

- Noalex Venezia: (1966–1970)
- Splügen Venezia (1970–1973)
- Canon Venezia: (1973–1980)
- Carrera Venezia: (1980–1984)
- Giomo Venezia: (1984–1987)
- Hitachi Venezia: (1987–1990)
- Scaini Venezia: (1991–1993)
- Acqua Lora Venezia: (1993–1994)
- San Benedetto: (1994–1995)
- Reyer Venezia: (1995-1996)
- Panto Venezia: (1998–2001)
- Acqua Pia Antica Marcia: (2005–2006)
- Umana Reyer Venezia: (2006–present)
