= 2024 Italian Basketball Cup =

Tournament details
- Country: Italy
- City: Turin
- Venue(s): Pala Alpitour
- Dates: 14–18 February 2024
- Teams: 8
- Defending champions: Germani Brescia

Final positions
- Champions: GeVi Napoli
- Runner-up: EA7 Emporio Armani Milano

Tournament statistics
- Matches played: 7

Awards
- MVP: (Poland) Michał Sokołowski

The 2024 Italian Basketball Cup, known as the Frecciarossa Final Eight 2024 for sponsorship reasons, was the 48th edition of Italy's national cup tournament. The competition was managed by the Lega Basket for LBA clubs. The tournament was played from 14 to 18 February 2024 in Turin, Piedmont, at the end of the first half of the 2023–24 LBA season.

Germani Brescia were the defending champions.

== Bracket ==
Quarterfinals
1	Umana Reyer Venezia	86
8	Estra Pistoia	71
4	EA7 Emporio Armani Milano	80
5	Dolomiti Energia Trento	57
2	Germani Brescia	74
7	Gevi Napoli	80
3	Virtus Segafredo Bologna	72
6	UnaHotels Reggio Emilia	81

Semifinals
Umana Reyer Venezia	77
EA7 Emporio Armani Milano	100
Gevi Napoli	87
UnaHotels Reggio Emilia	78

Finals
EA7 Emporio Armani Milano	72
Gevi Napoli	77

== Final ==
=== EA7 Emporio Armani Milano vs. Gevi Napoli ===
18 February 2024	EA7 Emporio Armani Milano	72–77	Gevi Napoli	Turin
18:45	Scoring by quarter: 19–24, 17–19, 17–17, 19–17
	Pts: Melli 20; Mirotic 19; Rebs: Melli 8 Asts: Shields 4 Napier 4 Hall 4	Boxscore	Pts: Ennis 21; Rebs: Ennis 7 Owens 7 Asts: Ennis 7	Arena: Inalpi Arena; Referees: Lanzarini; Borgioni; Gonella
