= Jordan Parks =

American basketball player

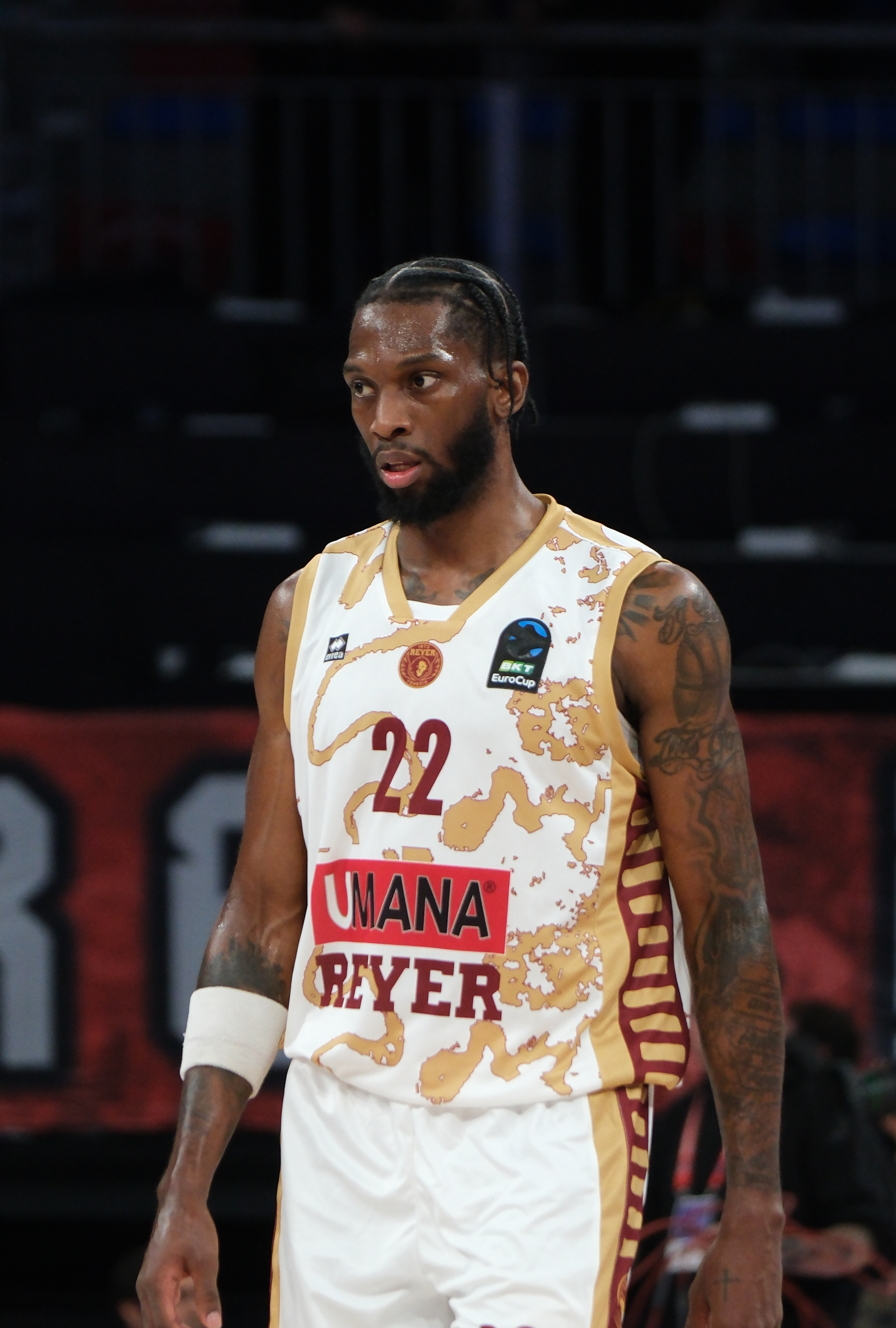
- Parks with Reyer Venezia in 2025

No. 22 – Umana Reyer Venezia
- Position: Power forward
- League: LBA; EuroCup

Personal information
- Born: April 6, 1994 (age 32) Staten Island, New York, U.S.
- Listed height: 2.03 m (6 ft 8 in)
- Listed weight: 96 kg (212 lb)

Career information
- High school: Campus Magnet (Queens, New York)
- College: College of Central Florida (2011–2013); North Carolina Central (2013–2015)
- NBA draft: 2015: undrafted
- Playing career: 2015–present

Career history
- 2015–2017: Pallacanestro Trieste 2004
- 2017–2018: Telekom Baskets Bonn
- 2018–2019: Orlandina
- 2019–2020: Universo Treviso Basket
- 2020–2022: Napoli
- 2022–present: Reyer Venezia Mestre

Career highlights
- Italian Serie A2 Champion (2021); Italian Serie A2 Cup Champion (2021)

Jordan Parks (born 6 April 1994) is an American professional basketball player for Reyer Venezia Mestre of the Italian Lega Basket Serie A (LBA) and the EuroCup.

== Professional career ==
During the 2019–20 season, Parks finished as the second-leading scorer in Serie A2 with Orlandina Basket with 23 points per game. He joined Universo Treviso Basket in 2019 and averaged 8.5 points per game. Parks signed with Basket Napoli on June 27, 2020.

On July 16, 2022, Parks signed with Reyer Venezia of the Lega Basket Serie A.

=== Career highs ===
- EuroCup: 30 points (vs Bahcesehir College Istanbul), 10 rebounds (vs JL Bourg-en-Bresse), 6 assists (vs Aris Thessaloniki Betsson), 4 steals (vs U-BT Cluj-Napoca), 3 blocks (vs U-BT Cluj-Napoca).
- Italian LBA: 40 points, 15 rebounds and a 50 efficiency rating for Napoli (Dec 11, 2025).

=== Individual honors ===
- Italian Serie A2 Champion: 2021 (with GeVi Napoli)
- Italian Serie A2 Cup Champion: 2021 (with GeVi Napoli)

== The Basketball Tournament ==
Jordan Parks played for DC On Point in the 2018 edition of The Basketball Tournament. He scored 7 points and had 7 rebounds in the team's first-round loss to Armored Athlete.
