= Derthona Basket =

- Nickname: Leoni (Lions)
- League: LBA; EuroCup
- Founded: 1955
- History: Derthona Basket; 1955–present
- Arena: Nova Arena
- Capacity: 5,000
- Location: Tortona, Alessandria, Italy
- Team colors: White, Black and Orange
- Main sponsor: Bertram Yachts
- President: Marco Picchi
- Head coach: Mario Fioretti
- Ownership: Beniamino Gavio
- Championships: 1 Italian LNP Cup; 1 Italian LNP Supercup
- Website: derthonabasket.it
| Home | Away |

Derthona Basket, known for sponsorship reasons as Bertram Derthona Tortona, is an Italian professional basketball team of the city of Tortona, in the province of Alessandria, Piedmont.

The team has achieved the promotion to the Lega Basket Serie A (LBA) after the end of the 2020–21 season of the Serie A2 Basket.

== History ==
=== 1955–2014: Decades within minor leagues ===
Derthona Basket was founded in 1955 in Tortona, a small town near Alessandria; however the club was later dissolved in 1962, only four years after obtaining the affiliation with the Italian Basketball Federation (FIP). In 1965, Derthona was refounded within the newly formed multisport club of the town.

After decades in the minor leagues, in 2008, Tortona signed the Macedonian point guard, Petar Naumoski. With the Macedonian champion, the team achieved the promotion to Serie C1, ending the season unbeaten. In the 2013–14 season, Derthona, led by coach Antonello Arioli, was the protagonist of an extraordinary season, which saw the so-called Lions at the top of the standings from the beginning to end of the season. One of the greatest moments of that year occurred on 19 January 2014 in the historic PalaDozza in Bologna, where Derthona beat Fortitudo Bologna 61-83. The team won the playoffs, defeating Legnano Basket Knights in the finals and reaching the Serie A2.

=== 2014–2018: Years in the second league ===
In the 2015–16 season, Derthona arrived third in the West Group, qualifying for the playoffs, where it eliminated 3–1 Pallacanestro Trieste in the first round, while in the quarterfinals it lost 3–2 against Pallacanestro Brescia. In the 2016–17 season, led by coach Demis Cavina, Derthona ended the regular season at the second place in the West Group, qualifying for the playoffs where it ousted 3–1 Pallacanestro Mantovana in the first round, but it was eliminated in the quarterfinals by Trieste for 3–1.

On 4 March 2018, Derthona won his first official title, the Italian LNP Cup, defeating Basket Ravenna 89–57. The team, coached by Lorenzo Pansa, qualyfied for the playoffs, ending the regular season at the fifth place in the West Group. However, the Lions were eliminated in the first round 3-1 by Udine.

=== 2018–present: Ramondino era ===
On 22 October 2018, after three defeats in the first three games of the season, Derthona sacked Lorenzo Pansa and, on the following day, signed Marco Ramondino as the new head coach of the team. On 29 September 2019, Derthona won its second official title, the LNP Supercup, defeating Basket Torino 81–84.

In the 2020–21 season, Derthona ended the regular season at the second place. In the playoffs, the Lions defeated 3–2 Ravenna in the quarterfinals and 3–1 Eurobasket Roma in the semifinals. On 29 June 2021, led by important American players like Jamarr Sanders and Jalen Cannon, as well as the young Italian pointguard Bruno Mascolo, Derthona defeated Torino 3–2 in the national finals, reaching the Serie A for the first time in its history.

In the following summer, the entrepreneur Beniamino Gavio, who already sponsored the team in the previous season with his luxury yachts company Bertram Yachts, became the new owner of the club. During the first season in the top league, the team confirmed the backbone of the roster, but signed also good international players like J. P. Macura, Chris Wright, Tyler Cain and Mike Daum, as well as the Italian-Argentine veteran Ariel Filloy. The Lions took part in the 2022 Italian Basketball Cup, defeating Trieste 94–82 and Virtus Bologna 94–82, reaching the finals, where it lost against Olimpia Milano 78–61. Derthona ended the season at the fourth place and, after having defeated Reyer Venezia in the playoffs' quarterfinals by 3–1, it lost against Virtus by 3–0.

== Honours ==
Italian Cup

- Runners-up (1): 2021–22

Italian LNP Cup

- Winners (1): 2018

Italian LNP Supercup

- Winners (1): 2019

== Players ==
=== Current roster ===
Note: Flags indicate national team eligibility at FIBA-sanctioned events. Players may hold other non-FIBA nationalities not displayed.

Derthona Basket roster
Players
Coaches

| Pos. | No. | Nat. | Name | Ht. | Wt. | Age |
|---|---|---|---|---|---|---|
| PF | 00 | (Cameroon) | Eboua, Paul | 2.03 m (6 ft 8 in) | 97 kg (214 lb) | 26 – 15 February 2000 |
| PG | 1 | (Armenia) | Vital, Christian | 1.88 m (6 ft 2 in) | 85 kg (187 lb) | 29 – 21 March 1997 |
| PG | 3 | (United States) | Hubb, Prentiss | 1.91 m (6 ft 3 in) | 80 kg (176 lb) | 27 – 19 March 1999 |
| PF | 4 | (United States) | Gorham, Justin | 2.01 m (6 ft 7 in) | 102 kg (225 lb) | 28 – 6 August 1998 |
| G/F | 6 | (Italy) | Pecchia, Andrea | 1.97 m (6 ft 6 in) | 87 kg (192 lb) | 28 – 16 November 1997 |
| G | 12 | (Italy) | Bortolani, Giordano | 1.93 m (6 ft 4 in) | 85 kg (187 lb) | 25 – 2 December 2000 |
| C | 17 | (Poland) | Olejniczak, Dominik | 2.13 m (7 ft 0 in) | 118 kg (260 lb) | 30 – 1 July 1996 |
| G | 21 | (United States) | Maddox Jr., Dante | 1.88 m (6 ft 2 in) | | 24 – 15 January 2002 |
| F | 24 | (Italy) | Gazzotti, Giulio | 2.02 m (6 ft 8 in) | 104 kg (229 lb) | 35 – 23 September 1991 |
| F | 35 | (Germany) | Jallow, Karim | 1.98 m (6 ft 6 in) | 90 kg (198 lb) | 29 – 13 April 1997 |
| SG | 42 | (United States) | Durham, Aljami | 1.93 m (6 ft 4 in) | 82 kg (181 lb) | 28 – 30 September 1998 |

Head coach

- (Italy) Mario Fioretti

Assistant coach(es)

- (Italy) Jacopo Squarcina
- (Italy) Andrea Vicenzutto

Legend

- (C) Team captain
- Injured

- Roster
Updated: November 9, 2026

=== Depth chart ===
| Pos. | Starting 5 | Bench 1 | Bench 2 |
|---|---|---|---|
| C | Dominik Olejniczak | Paul Eboua |
| PF | Amar Alibegović | Justin Gorham |
| SF | Karim Jallow | Aljami Durham | Giulio Gazzotti |
| SG | Dante Maddox Jr. | Giordano Bortolani | Andrea Pecchia |
| PG | Prentiss Hubb | Christian Vital |

=== Notable players ===
- (Italy) Tommaso Baldasso
- (Cameroon) (Italy) Paul Biligha
- (United States) Tyler Cain
- (United States) Mike Daum
- (Argentina) (Italy) Ariel Filloy
- (Italy) Luca Garri
- (Latvia) Andrejs Gražulis
- (France) Ismaël Kamagate
- (United States) J. P. Macura
- (United States) Derrick Marks
- (North Macedonia) Petar Naumoski
- (Estonia) Joonas Riismaa
- (Croatia) Leon Radošević
- (United States) Christian Vital
- (United States) Chris Wright

== See also ==
- Category:Derthona Basket players
