= Napoli Basketball =

Napoli Basket
- League: LBA; EuroCup
- Founded: 2016; 10 years ago
- History: Cuore Napoli Basket (2016–2018); Napoli Basket (2018–present)
- Arena: PalaBarbuto
- Capacity: 3,890
- Location: Naples, Italy
- Team colors: Blue and white
- President: Matt Rizzetta
- General manager: James Laughlin
- Head coach: Jasmin Repeša
- Team captain: Guglielmo Caruso
- Championships: 1 Italian Cup; 1 Italian A2 Cup; 1 Italian B Cup
- Website: napolibasketball.com
Home	Away	Third

Napoli Basketball, also known as Napoli Basket, is an Italian professional basketball team, based in Naples. The club plays in the Lega Basket Serie A (LBA), the highest level of competition in Italy, and in the EuroCup.

It is the de facto successor of the S.S. Basket Napoli, which was founded in 1946 and dissolved in 2009 due to financial troubles.

== History ==
=== 2016–2019: Beginnings ===
In August 2016, after a corporate failure of S.S. Basket Napoli, Ciro Ruggiero founded a new team, known as Cuore Napoli Basket. The transfer of the sporting title from Cilento Basket Agropoli allowed the newborn Neapolitan team to play in the 2016–17 Serie B. In the same season, Cuore Napoli Basket managed to win promotion to Serie A2, after having arrived first in Group C of the regular season and beat Bergamo Basket in the playoff's final. During the same season Napoli also won his first Italian Cup in the National Basketball League.

At the end of the 2017–18 season, Cuore Napoli Basket relegated to Serie B, after losing in the playouts against Roseto Sharks. At the end of the season, the management passed to the Neapolitan entrepreneurs Federico Grassi and Francesco Tavassi and the club changed its name to Napoli Basket. Gianluca Lulli was signed as new head coach. In 2018–19 Serie B, Napoli Basket closed the regular season at the 6th place in group D with 36 points, but it lost in the semifinals against Pallacanestro Palestrina.

=== 2019–present: Promotion to LBA and Italian Cup victory ===
In June 2019, the club announced that it had purchased the sports title from Legnano Basket Knights, obtaining the right to participate in the 2019–20 Serie A2 season. However, the season began with three consecutive defeats against NPC Rieti, Basket Latina and Junior Casale. Gianluca Lulli was sacked and the expert coach Stefano Sacripanti was signed. Napoli ended the regular season at the 8th place, achieving the second phase, which however was never played due to the COVID-19 pandemic. In the next summer, important players like Josh Mayo and Jordan Parks were signed. In the 2020–21 season, the team won its second Italian LNP Cup (the first in Serie A2), beating APU Udine for 80–69 in the final. On 27 June 2021, following the victory in the playoff's finals against Udine, Napoli was promoted to Lega Basket Serie A (LBA).

Despite a good start of the season, on 15 March 2022, coach Sacripanti was sacked following several defeats and the club hired Maurizio Buscaglia as new head coach. Moreover, on 29 March, Napoli signed the Lithuanian center Artūras Gudaitis, who had left Zenit Saint Petersburg following the Russian invasion of Ukraine. On May 1, Napoli defeated Fortitudo Bologna at PalaDozza, achieving the salvation from relegation.

After not making the playoffs in the 2021-22 season, the club decided to take new players during the offseason. These include Jordan Howard, Robert Johnson, David Michineau, Elijah Stewart and JaCorey Williams. On January 3, 2023, Buscaglia was esonerated and Cesare Pancotto ended up becoming the head coach after being an assistant coach for the team. During the season, they engaged Devin Davis, Joe Young and Thomas Wimbush. Though Johnson, Davis, Williams, Agravanis and Zanotti would all leave the club before the end of the season.

In 2023, Alessandro Dalla Salda became the new CEO and hired the Croatian Igor Miličić as new head coach. Moreover, the club signed important players like Jacob Pullen, Tyler Ennis, Michał Sokołowski, Tariq Owens and Markel Brown. On 18 February 2024, after having ousted Pallacanestro Brescia and Reggiana in the first two rounds, Napoli defeated Olimpia Milano in the final, winning the first Italian Cup of its history.

The 2024–25 season began with Igor Miličić confirmed as head coach, but with a complete overhaul of the roster, as all the key players from the previous season left Naples. Over the summer, nine new players joined the team, including point guard Kevin Pangos, shooting guards Zach Copeland and Charles Manning, small forward Jordan Hall, and power forward Deane Williams. To strengthen the Italian contingent, Napoli signed Leonardo Totè and Tomas Woldetensae, along with Estonian forward Kaspar Treier, who was developed in the Italian system.

In the first eleven rounds of the 2024–25 Serie A season, the team suffered eleven straight losses, showing serious weaknesses on both offense and defense. After the eighth game, the club’s management decided to part ways with head coach Igor Miličić, appointing Giorgio Valli to lead the team for the remainder of the season. This rough start left Napoli in a critical position in the standings, sitting in last place with a 3–13 record at the halfway mark. The only wins came against Scafati Basket (96–94 after overtime), Derthona (92–83), and Sassari (87–70).

=== The "American Era" (2025–present) ===
At the end of the 2024–25 season, American entrepreneur Matt Rizzetta became the club’s principal owner along with US-based business executives and investors Daniel Doyle, Bob Wood and Vincent T Beni. New York University professor and sports business expert Gina Antoniello joined as advisor and Nicola Cirrincione joined as US market representative.

With the arrival of the new ownership, the team’s name was changed to “Napoli Basketball,” and both organizational and technical restructurings were set in motion in preparation for the coming seasons.

NBA executive and New Orleans Pelicans Chief of Staff James Laughlin was hired as the General Manager and John Staudt was hired as Head of Scouting.

The era of new ownership was introduced in world-class fashion on a MSC cruise ship in Naples in front of more than 200 people. During the presentation, rumors swirled around the entrance of Shaquille O’Neal as a prospective addition to the ownership group, however no official statement or confirmation was made.

== Players ==
=== Current roster ===
Napoli Basket roster
Players
Coaches

Pos.	No.	Nat.	Name	Ht.	Wt.	Age
PG	0	(Italy)	Spissu, Marco	1.85 m (6 ft 1 in)	80 kg (176 lb)	31 – 5 February 1995
PF	1	(United States)	Seljaas, Zac	2.00 m (6 ft 7 in)	100 kg (220 lb)	29 – 11 July 1997
PG	3	(United States)	Dowtin Jr., Jeff	1.91 m (6 ft 3 in)	80 kg (176 lb)	29 – 10 May 1997
SF	10	(Italy)	Faggian, Leonardo	1.95 m (6 ft 5 in)	92 kg (203 lb)	22 – 6 February 2004
G/F	11	(Italy)	Petrucelli, John	1.93 m (6 ft 4 in)	82 kg (181 lb)	34 – 27 October 1992
F	12	(Senegal)	Sankare, Assane	2.06 m (6 ft 9 in)	100 kg (220 lb)	19 – 10 April 2007
F	14	(Australia)	White, Jack	2.00 m (6 ft 7 in)	102 kg (225 lb)	29 – 5 August 1997
G	22	(United States)	Brown, Markel	1.91 m (6 ft 3 in)	86 kg (190 lb)	34 – 29 January 1992
SF	23	(North Macedonia)	Jakimovski, Andrej	2.02 m (6 ft 8 in)	98 kg (216 lb)	25 – 18 March 2001
C	25	(United States)	Tarczewski, Kaleb	2.13 m (7 ft 0 in)	111 kg (245 lb)	33 – 26 February 1993
C	30	(Italy)	Caruso, Guglielmo (C)	2.09 m (6 ft 10 in)	105 kg (231 lb)	27 – 3 July 1999
F/C	35	(Italy)	Totè, Leonardo	2.11 m (6 ft 11 in)	107 kg (236 lb)	29 – 8 July 1997
SG	37	(United States)	Ramsey, Jahmi'us	1.91 m (6 ft 3 in)	86 kg (190 lb)	25 – 1 June 2001

Head coach

- (Croatia) Jasmin Repeša

Assistant coach(es)

- (Croatia) Dino Repeša
- (Italy) Pablo Trovato
- (Italy) Davide Gabriele

Legend

- (C) Team captain
- Injured

- Roster
Updated: October 2, 2026

=== Depth chart ===
Pos.	Starting 5	Bench 1	Bench 2
C	Leonardo Totè	Kaleb Tarczewski	Guglielmo Caruso
PF	Zac Seljaas	Jack White	Assane Sankare
SF	Andrej Jakimovski	John Petrucelli
SG	Jahmi'us Ramsey	Markel Brown	Leonardo Faggian
PG	Jeff Dowtin Jr.	Marco Spissu

(colors: Italian or homegrown players; foreign players; young players)

=== Notable players ===
Note: Flags indicate national team eligibility at FIBA-sanctioned events. Players may hold other non-FIBA nationalities not displayed.

Criteria

To appear in this section a player must have either:

- Set a club record or won an individual award while at the club
- Played at least one official international match for their national team at any time
- Played at least one official NBA match at any time.

- Diego Monaldi (2019–2021)
- Josh Mayo (2020–2021)
- Jordan Parks (2020–2022)
- Andrea Zerini (2020–2023)
- Frank Elegar (2021–2022)
- Jeremy Pargo (2021–2022)
- Christian Burns (2022)
- Artūras Gudaitis (2022)
- Dimitrios Agravanis (2022)
- Elijah Stewart (2022–2023)
- Simone Zanotti (2022–2023)
- Tyler Ennis (2023–2024)
- Tariq Owens (2023–2024)
- Jacob Pullen (2023–2024, 2024–2025)
- Michał Sokołowski (2023–2024)
- Erick Green (2024–2025)
- Kevin Pangos (2024–2025)
- Kaspar Treier (2024–present)
- Savion Flagg (2025–present)
- Stefano Gentile (2025–present)

== Honours ==
=== Domestic competitions ===
- Italian Cup

Winners (1): 2023–24
