= Pallacanestro Brescia =

Leonessa Brescia
- Nickname: Leonessa d'Italia (Lioness of Italy)
- Leagues: Serie B
- Founded: 1957; 69 years ago
- History: List: Basket Brescia (1957–1996) Basket Brescia 2005 (2005–2009) Basket Brescia Leonessa (2009–2020) Pallacanestro Brescia (2020–2026) Leonessa Brescia (2026–present)
- Arena: PalaLeonessa
- Capacity: 5,200
- Location: Brescia, Italy
- President: Graziella Bragaglio
- Head coach: Marco Calvani
- Ownership: Graziella Bragaglio; Matteo Bonetti
- Championships: 1 Italian Cup; 2 Serie A2 Basket
- Retired numbers: 2 (13, 14)
- Website: leonessa-brescia.it
Home	Away	Europe

The Pallacanestro Brescia, better known for sponsorship reasons as Leonessa Brescia, is an Italian professional basketball team, based in Brescia, Lombardy. Founded in 2009, the team plays in Serie B since the 2026–27 season.

== History ==
The history of the Pallacanestro Brescia as we know it today, began in 2009 when Graziella Bragaglio and Matteo Bonetti, took back to the city, the basket's love. The name of the team has always been Basket Brescia Leonessa, till 2020 when it changed to Pallacanestro Brescia.

In 2016, after beating Fortitudo Bologna at game 5 of the league's playoffs, the team Brescia Leonessa won the Serie A2 League and returns in the highest-tier of the Italian basketball league system after 28 years.

In 2018, Pallacanestro Brescia reached the final of the Italian Cup. The team lost 69–67, as Fiat Torino went on to win its first Cup ever.

During season 2018-2019 the team played its first international Cup, participating at the EuroCup.

The 2021–2022 season has been one of the best seasons of Germani Brescia's history. The team won 14 consecutive matches, with 21 matches won over 30 matches played. The team and players also won awards given by LBA at the end of the season.

The greatest achievement of his history for Brescia has been the win of the Coppa Italia on February 19, 2023, the first time ever for them.

In June 2026, the team's LBA licence was transferred to a new club, Maxima Roma, ending Pallacanestro Brescia's presence in the top division.

== Arena and logo ==
The club plays its home games in PalaLeonessa, the new arena built in the city in year 2018. It can host 5.000 people. The logo of Pallacanestro Brescia is blue and white, with a female lion inside. These are the colours and symbol also of the city of Brescia.

== Season by season ==
Season	Tier	League	Pos.	Italian Cup	European competitions	
2015–16	2	Serie A2	1st	–	–	
2016–17	1	LBA	10th	SF	–	
2017–18	1	LBA	4th	Finalist	–	
2018–19	1	LBA	12nd	–	EuroCup	RS
2019–20	1	LBA	3rd	QF	EuroCup	L16
2020–21	1	LBA	9th	–	Eurocup	RS
2021–22	1	LBA	5th	SF	–	
2022–23	1	LBA	9th	Champion	Eurocup	L16
2023–24	1	LBA	3rd	QF	–	
2024–25	1	LBA	2nd	SF	–	
2025–26	1	LBA	4th	SF	–	
2026–27	3	Serie B		–	–	

== Players ==
=== Current roster ===
Note: Flags indicate national team eligibility at FIBA-sanctioned events. Players may hold other non-FIBA nationalities not displayed.

Leonessa Brescia roster
Players	Coaches
Pos. / No. / Nat. / Name / Ht. / Wt. / Age; F/C / 23 / (Italy) / Burns, Christian / 2.03 m (6 ft 8 in) / 110 kg (243 lb) / 41 – 4 September 1985	Head coach: (Italy) Marco Calvani; Legend: (C) Team captain; Injured; Roster

=== Notable players ===
Note: Flags indicate national team eligibility at FIBA-sanctioned events. Players may hold other non-FIBA nationalities not displayed.

Criteria

To appear in this section a player must have either:

- Set a club record or won an individual award while at the club
- Played at least one official international match for their national team at any time
- Played at least one official NBA match at any time.

- (United States) Ryan Thompson (2011–12)
- (United States) J.R. Giddens (2012–14)
- (United States) Tamar Slay (2013–14)
- (United States) (Philippines) Justin Brownlee (2014–15)
- (United States) Damian Hollis (2015–2023)
- (Albania) Franko Bushati (2015–2017)
- (United States) David Moss (2015–2023)
- (United States) (Italy) Christian Burns (2016–2017, 2020–2024, 2026–present)
- (Italy) Michele Vitali (2016–2018)
- (Italy) Luca Vitali (2016–2021)
- (United States) Marcus Landry (2016–2018)
- (Austria) Benjamin Ortner (2017–2018)
- (United States) Bryce Cotton (2018)
- (United States) Jared Cunningham (2018–2019)
- (Italy) Awudu Abass (2018–2020)
- (United States) Tyler Cain (2019–2020)
- (Latvia) Ojārs Siliņš (2019–2020)
- (United States) (Israel) T. J. Cline (2020–2021)
- (United States) Tyler Kalinoski (2020–2021)
- (United States) Michael Cobbins (2021–2024)
- (Italy) Amedeo Della Valle (2021–2026)
- (Canada) Naz Mitrou-Long (2021–2022)
- (Ghana) (Italy) David Cournooh (2022–2026)
- (United States) C.J. Massinburg (2022–2024)
- (Puerto Rico) Tai Odiase (2022–2023)
- (United States) Jason Burnell (2023–2026)
- (Croatia) Miro Bilan (2024–2026)
- (Senegal) Maurice Ndour (2024–2026)

== Honours ==
- Serie A2 Basket

Champions (2): 2010–11, 2015–16

- Italian Cup

Winners (1): 2023
Runners-up (1): 2018

== Sponsorship names ==
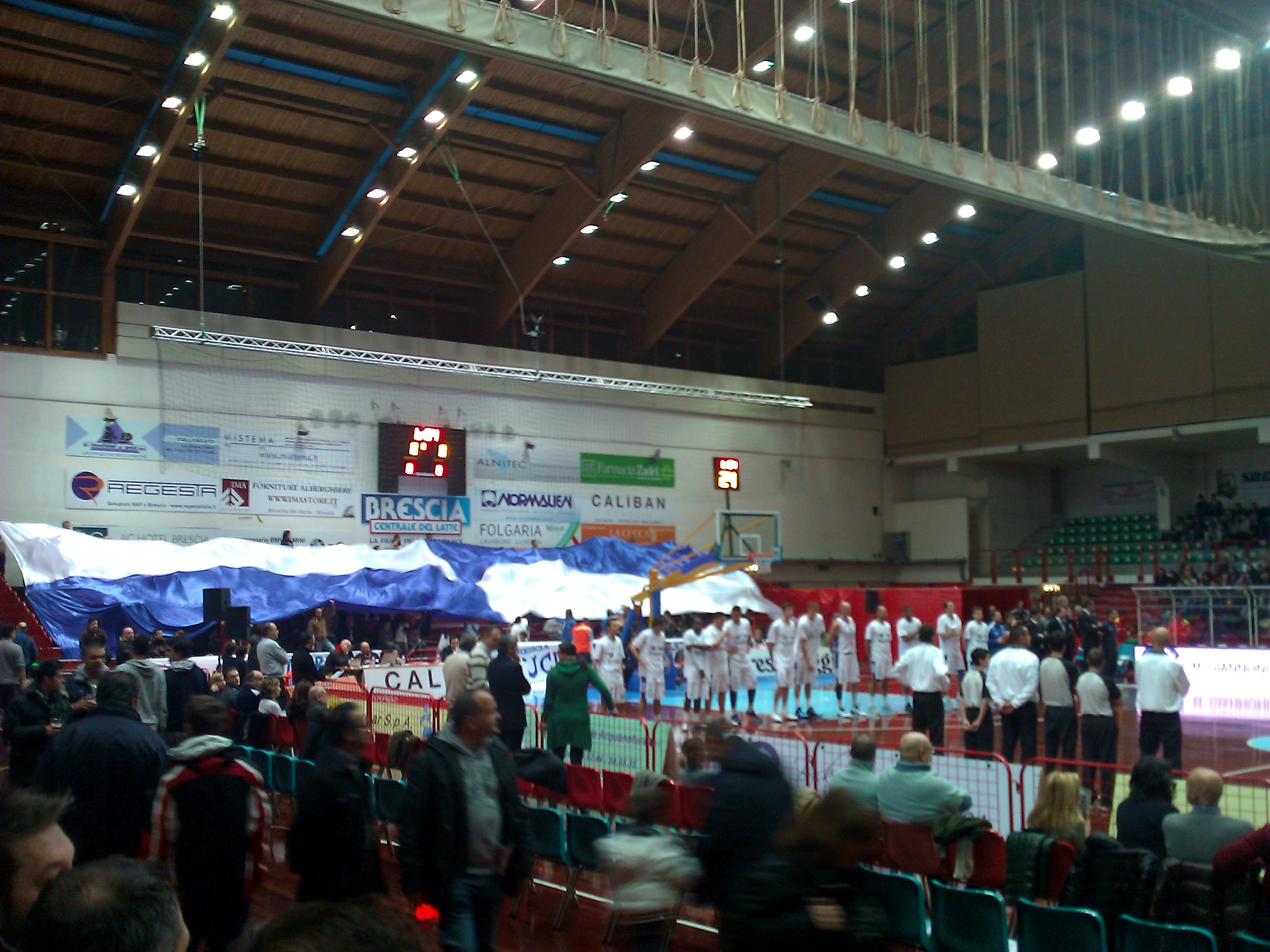
Home game of Brescia in 2012

Through the years, due to sponsorship deals, it has been also known as:

- Centrale del Latte di Brescia (2009–2016)
- Germani Trasporti (2016–present) (Since 2018 only in LBA)
- FAP Investments (2018–present) (EuroCup)

== Kit ==
=== Manufacturer ===
2017–present	Erreà
