= Italian Basketball Cup =

Basketball Cup

- Current season, competition or edition: 2026 Italian Basketball Cup
- Sport: Basketball
- Founded: 1967-68 season
- Country: Italy
- Continent: (European Union) Europe
- Most recent champions: Olimpia Milano (9th title)
- Most titles: Olimpia Milano (9 titles)
- Broadcaster: Eurosport
- Related competitions: Lega Basket Serie A (LBA); Italian Basketball Supercup; Italian Legadue Cup
- Website: LBA Final Eight

The Italian Basketball Cup (Italian: Coppa Italiana di Pallacanestro), or Coppa Italia, is an annual professional basketball competition between pro clubs from the Italian Basketball League (LBA). It is Italy's first-tier cup competition, and is not to be confused with Italy's second-tier cup competition, the Italian Legadue Cup.

== History and format ==
The first edition of the Italian Cup championship took place in 1968, and was won by Partenope Napoli. Between 1975 and 1983, the cup competition was not held, but it has been held regularly every year from 1984 onward. The formula of the competition has changed over the years. Beginning in 1990, after an elimination phase and subsequent knockout rounds, the tournament ends in a final four format. From 2000 onward, the ranked 8 teams compete for the trophy in a Final Eight format which consists of the quarter-finals, semifinals and the final over 3 days.

Finally, the winner of the Italian Cup championship then has the right to face the winner of the Italian League championship in a single final game to determine the winner the Italian Supercup championship.

== Title holders ==
- 1967–68: Ignis Sud Napoli
- 1968–69: Ignis Varese
- 1969–70: Ignis Varese
- 1970–71: Ignis Varese
- 1971–72: Simmenthal Milano
- 1972–73: Ignis Varese
- 1973–74: Norda Bologna
- 1974–83: Not Held
- 1983–84: Granarolo Bologna
- 1984–85: Scavolini Pesaro
- 1985–86: Simac Milano
- 1986–87: Tracer Milano
- 1987–88: Snaidero Caserta
- 1988–89: Knorr Bologna
- 1989–90: Knorr Bologna
- 1990–91: Glaxo Verona
- 1991–92: Scavolini Pesaro
- 1992–93: Benetton Treviso
- 1993–94: Benetton Treviso
- 1994–95: Benetton Treviso
- 1995–96: Stefanel Milano
- 1996–97: Kinder Bologna
- 1997–98: Teamsystem Bologna
- 1998–99: Kinder Bologna
- 1999–00: Benetton Treviso
- 2000–01: Kinder Bologna
- 2001–02: Kinder Bologna
- 2002–03: Benetton Treviso
- 2003–04: Benetton Treviso
- 2004–05: Benetton Treviso
- 2005–06: Carpisa Napoli
- 2006–07: Benetton Treviso
- 2007–08: A.IR. Avellino
- 2008–09: Montepaschi Siena
- 2009–10: Montepaschi Siena
- 2010–11: Montepaschi Siena
- 2011–12: Montepaschi Siena (revoked)
- 2012–13: Montepaschi Siena (revoked)
- 2013–14: Banco di Sardegna Sassari
- 2014–15: Banco di Sardegna Sassari
- 2015–16: EA7 Emporio Armani Milano
- 2016–17: EA7 Emporio Armani Milano
- 2017–18: Fiat Torino
- 2018–19: Vanoli Cremona
- 2019–20: Umana Reyer Venezia
- 2020–21: AX Armani Exchange Milano
- 2021–22: AX Armani Exchange Milano
- 2022–23: Germani Brescia
- 2023–24: Napoli Basket
- 2024–25: Dolomiti Energia Trento
- 2025–26: EA7 Emporio Armani Milano

== The finals ==
Season	Champions	Score	Runners-up	Venue	Location	MVP
(Italy) Coppa Italiana di Pallacanestro
1967–68	Ignis Sud Napoli	93–68	Cassera Bologna	PalaDozza	Bologna	N/A
1968–69	Ignis Varese	73–72	Fides Napoli	Palazzo dello Sport	Rome	N/A
1969–70	Ignis Varese	74–66	Simmenthal Milano	Palazzo dello Sport	Rome	N/A
1970–71	Ignis Varese	83–60	Fides Napoli	PalaBarsacchi	Viareggio	N/A
1971–72	Simmenthal Milano	81–77	Ignis Varese	PalaRuffini	Turin	N/A
1972–73	Ignis Varese	94–65	Saclà Asti	Pala E.I.B.	Brescia	N/A
1973–74	Norda Bologna	90–74	Rino Snaidero Udine	PalaLaghetto	Vicenza	N/A
1974–83	Not held					
1983–84	Granarolo Bologna	80–78	Indesit Caserta	PalaDozza	Bologna	N/A
1984–85	Scavolini Pesaro	186–184	Ciaocrem Varese	PalaIgnis & Palasport	Varese & Pesaro	N/A
1985–86	Simac Milano	102–92	Scavolini Pesaro	PalaDozza	Bologna	N/A
1986–87	Tracer Milano	95–93	Scavolini Pesaro	PalaDozza	Bologna	N/A
1987–88	Snaidero Caserta	113–100	Divarese Varese	PalaDozza	Bologna	N/A
1988–89	Knorr Bologna	96–93	Snaidero Caserta	PalaDozza	Bologna	N/A
1989–90	Knorr Bologna	94–83	il Messaggero Roma	PalaGalassi	Forlì	N/A
1990–91	Glaxo Verona	97–85	Philips Milano	PalaDozza	Bologna	N/A
1991–92	Scavolini Pesaro	95–92	Benetton Treviso	PalaGalassi	Forlì	N/A
1992–93	Benetton Treviso	75–73	Knorr Bologna	PalaGalassi	Forlì	N/A
1993–94	Benetton Treviso	78–61	Glaxo Verona	PalaMalaguti	Casalecchio di Reno	(Italy) Davide Bonora
1994–95	Benetton Treviso	81–77	illycaffè Trieste	PalaMalaguti	Casalecchio di Reno	(United States) Orlando Woolridge
1995–96	Stefanel Milano	90–72	Riello Mash Verona	Fila Forum	Assago	(United States) Rolando Blackman
1996–97	Kinder Bologna	75–67	Polti Cantù	PalaMalaguti	Casalecchio di Reno	(Federal Republic of Yugoslavia) (Greece) Bane Prelević
1997–98	Teamsystem Bologna	73–55	Benetton Treviso	PalaMalaguti	Casalecchio di Reno	(Italy) Carlton Myers
1998–99	Kinder Bologna	65–63	Varese Roosters	PalaMalaguti	Casalecchio di Reno	(Italy) Alessando Frosini
1999–00	Benetton Treviso	78–59	Kinder Bologna	PalaPentimele	Reggio Calabria	(Italy) Denis Marconato
2000–01	Kinder Bologna	83–58	Scavolini Pesaro	PalaGalassi	Forlì	(United States) Rashard Griffith
2001–02	Kinder Bologna	79–77	Montepaschi Siena	PalaGalassi	Forlì	(Argentina) Manu Ginóbili
2002–03	Benetton Treviso	86–77	Oregon Scientific Cantù	PalaGalassi	Forlì	(United States) Tyus Edney
2003–04	Benetton Treviso	85–76	Scavolini Pesaro	PalaGalassi	Forlì	(Spain) Jorge Garbajosa
2004–05	Benetton Treviso	74–64	Bipop Carire Reggio Emilia	PalaGalassi	Forlì	(Italy) Massimo Bulleri
2005–06	Carpisa Napoli	85–83	Lottomatica Roma	PalaGalassi	Forlì	(United States) David Hawkins
2006–07	Benetton Treviso	67–65	VidiVici Bologna	Futurshow Station	Casalecchio di Reno	(United States) Spencer Nelson
2007–08	A.IR. Avellino	73–67	La Fortezza Bologna	Futurshow Station	Casalecchio di Reno	(United States) Devin Smith
2008–09	Montepaschi Siena	70–69	La Fortezza Bologna	Futurshow Station	Casalecchio di Reno	(United States) Shaun Stonerook
2009–10	Montepaschi Siena	83–75	Canadian Solar Bologna	Palasport Del Mauro	Avellino	(United States) Shaun Stonerook (2)
2010–11	Montepaschi Siena	79–72	Bennet Cantù	Palasport Olimpico	Turin	(Lithuania) Kšyštof Lavrinovič
2011–12	Montepaschi Siena (revoked)	88–71	Bennet Cantù	Palasport Olimpico	Turin	(Australia) David Andersen
2012–13	Montepaschi Siena (revoked)	77–74	Cimberio Varese	Mediolanum Forum	Assago	(Italy) Daniel Hackett
2013–14	Banco di Sardegna Sassari	80–73	Montepaschi Siena	Mediolanum Forum	Assago	(United States) Travis Diener
2014–15	Banco di Sardegna Sassari	101–94	EA7 Emporio Armani Milano	PalaDesio	Desio	(United States) (Poland) David Logan
2015–16	EA7 Emporio Armani Milano	82–76	Sidigas Avellino	Mediolanum Forum	Assago	(United States) Rakim Sanders
2016–17	EA7 Emporio Armani Milano	84–74	Banco di Sardegna Sassari	Centro Fieristico Rimini	Rimini	(United States) (Georgia (country)) Ricky Hickman
2017–18	Fiat Torino	69–67	Germani Brescia	Nelson Mandela Forum	Florence	(United States) Vander Blue
2018–19	Vanoli Cremona	84–74	New Basket Brindisi	Nelson Mandela Forum	Florence	(United States) Drew Crawford
2019–20	Umana Reyer Venezia	73–67	Happy Casa Brindisi	Adriatic Arena	Pesaro	(United States) Austin Daye
2020–21	AX Armani Exchange Milano	87–59	Carpegna Prosciutto Pesaro	Mediolanum Forum	Assago (Milan)	(Italy) Luigi Datome
2021–22	AX Armani Exchange Milano	78–61	Bertram Tortona	Vitrifrigo Arena	Pesaro	(United States) Malcolm Delaney
2022–23	Germani Brescia	84–76	Virtus Segafredo Bologna	Pala Alpitour	Turin	(Italy) Amedeo Della Valle
2023–24	Napoli Basket	77–72	Olimpia Milano	Pala Alpitour	Turin	(Poland) Michał Sokołowski
2024–25	Dolomiti Energia Trento	79–63	Olimpia Milano	Pala Alpitour	Turin	(United Kingdom) Quinn Ellis
2025–26	Olimpia Milano	85–77	Bertram Tortona	Pala Alpitour	Turin	(United States) Armoni Brooks

Source: LBA Final Eight

== Performance by club ==
Rank	Club	Titles	Runner-up	Champion Years
1.	Olimpia Milano	9	3	1971–72, 1985–86, 1986–87, 1995–96, 2015–16, 2016–17, 2020–21, 2021–22, , 2025–26
2.	Virtus Bologna	8	7	1973–74, 1983–84, 1988–89, 1989–90, 1996–97, 1998–99, 2000–01, 2001–02
3.	Treviso	8	2	1992–93, 1993–94, 1994–95, 1999–00, 2002–03, 2003–04, 2004–05, 2006–07
4.	Varese	4	5	1968–69, 1969–70, 1970–71, 1972–73
5.	Mens Sana 1871	3	1	2008–09, 2009–10, 2010–11, 2011–12 (revoked), 2012–13 (revoked)
6.	Victoria Libertas	2	4	1984–85, 1991–92
7.	Dinamo Sassari	2	1	2013–14, 2014–15
8.	Napoli Basket	2	0	2005-06, 2023–24
9.	Partenope Napoli	1	2	1967–68
10.	JuveCaserta	1	2	1987–88
11.	Scaligera Verona	1	2	1990–91
12.	Fortitudo Bologna	1	1	1997–98
13.	Felice Scandone	1	1	2007–08
14.	Brescia Leonessa	1	1	2022–23
15.	Auxilium Torino	1	0	2017–18
16.	Vanoli Cremona	1	0	2018–19
17.	Reyer Venezia	1	0	2019–20
18.	Aquila Basket Trento	1	0	2024–25
19.	Cantù	0	4	
20.	Virtus Roma	0	2	
21.	Libertas Asti	0	1	
22.	Amatori Udine	0	1	
23.	Trieste	0	1	
24.	Reggiana	0	1	
25.	New Basket Brindisi	0	1	
26.	Derthona Basket	0	1	

== See also ==
- Italian Basketball Federation
- Italian Basketball League
- Italian Basketball Supercup
- Italian Basketball All Star Game
- Serie A2 Basket
- Italian LNP Cup
