= List of 2018–19 NBA season transactions =

This is a list of transactions that took place during the 2018 NBA off-season and the 2018–19 NBA season.

== Retirement ==
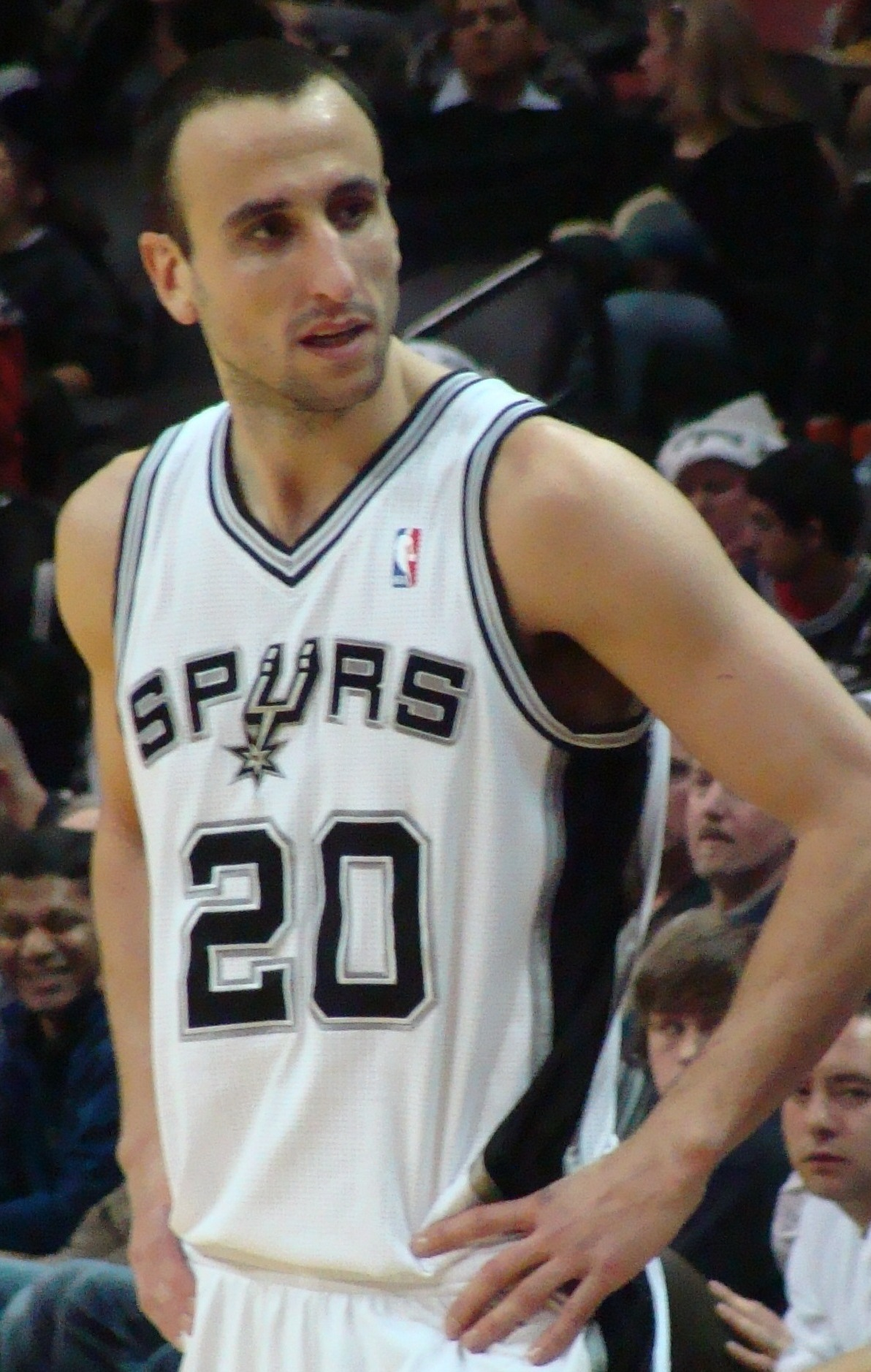
Manu Ginóbili with the San Antonio Spurs

Date	Name	Team(s) played (years)	Age	Notes	Ref.
May 10	Nick Collison	Seattle SuperSonics/Oklahoma City Thunder (2003–2018)	37	Played his entire career with one franchise	
May 25	Mo Williams	Utah Jazz (2003–2004; 2012–2013); Milwaukee Bucks (2004–2008); Cleveland Cavaliers (2008–2011; 2015–2016); Los Angeles Clippers (2011–2012); Portland Trail Blazers (2013–2014); Minnesota Timberwolves (2014–2015); Charlotte Hornets (2015)	35	NBA champion (2016); NBA All-Star (2009); Became an assistant coach for Cal State Northridge	
July 13	P. J. Hairston	Charlotte Hornets (2014–2016); Memphis Grizzlies (2016)	25	Also played in NBA G League	
July 17	Roy Hibbert	Indiana Pacers (2008–2015); Los Angeles Lakers (2015–2016); Charlotte Hornets (2016–2017); Denver Nuggets (2017)	31	2× NBA All-Star (2012, 2014); NBA All-Defensive Second Team (2014)	
August 27	Manu Ginóbili	San Antonio Spurs (2002–2018)	41	4× NBA champion (2003, 2005, 2007, 2014); 2× NBA All-Star (2005, 2011); 2× All-NBA Third Team (2008, 2011); NBA Sixth Man of the Year (2008); NBA All-Rookie Team (2003)	
August 30	David West	New Orleans Hornets (Note: During the 2005–06 and 2006–07 seasons, the team was known as the New Orleans/Oklahoma City Hornets during their temporary relocation to Oklahoma City due to Hurricane Katrina.) (2003–2011); Indiana Pacers (2011–2015); San Antonio Spurs (2015–2016); Golden State Warriors (2016–2018)	38	2× NBA champion (2017, 2018); 2× NBA All-Star (2008, 2009)	
September 6	Boris Diaw	Atlanta Hawks (2003–2005); Phoenix Suns (2005–2008); Charlotte Hornets (2008–2012); San Antonio Spurs (2012–2016); Utah Jazz (2016–2017)	36	NBA champion (2014); NBA Most Improved Player Award (2006); Also played overseas	
September 24	Mike Dunleavy Jr.	Golden State Warriors (2002–2007); Indiana Pacers (2007–2011); Milwaukee Bucks (2011–2013); Chicago Bulls (2013–2016); Cleveland Cavaliers (2016–2017); Atlanta Hawks (2017)	38	Hired as pro scout by the Golden State Warriors	
September 27	Mirza Teletović	Brooklyn Nets (2012–2015); Phoenix Suns (2015–2016); Milwaukee Bucks (2016–2018)	33	Also played overseas	
October 13	Richard Jefferson	New Jersey Nets (2001–2008); Milwaukee Bucks (2008–2009); San Antonio Spurs (2009–2012); Golden State Warriors (2012–2013); Utah Jazz (2013–2014); Dallas Mavericks (2014–2015); Cleveland Cavaliers (2015–2017); Denver Nuggets (2017–2018)	38	NBA champion (2016); NBA All-Rookie Second Team (2002)	
February 27	Ronnie Price	Sacramento Kings (2005–2007); Utah Jazz (2007–2011); Phoenix Suns (2011–2012; 2015–2016; 2017); Portland Trail Blazers (2012–2013); Orlando Magic (2013–2014); Los Angeles Lakers (2014–2015)	35	Hired as pro scout by the Phoenix Suns	
March 24	Al Jefferson	Boston Celtics (2004–2007); Minnesota Timberwolves (2007–2010); Utah Jazz (2010–2013); Charlotte Bobcats/Hornets (2013–2016); Indiana Pacers (2016–2018)	34	NBA All-Rookie Second Team (2005); All-NBA Third Team (2014); Also played overseas	
March 26	Kris Humphries	Utah Jazz (2004–2006); Toronto Raptors (2006–2009); Dallas Mavericks (2009–2010); New Jersey Nets / Brooklyn Nets (2010–2013); Boston Celtics (2013–2014); Washington Wizards (2014–2016); Phoenix Suns (2016); Atlanta Hawks (2016–2017)	34		
April 30	Gerald Henderson Jr.	Charlotte Bobcats/Hornets (2009–2015); Portland Trail Blazers (2015–2016); Philadelphia 76ers (2016–2017)	31		

== Front office movements ==
=== Head coach changes ===
Off-season

Departure date	Team	Outgoing head coach	Reason for departure	Hire date	Incoming head coach	Last coaching position	Ref.
April 12	New York Knicks	Jeff Hornacek	Fired	May 7	David Fizdale	Memphis Grizzlies head coach (2016–2017)	
April 12	Orlando Magic	Frank Vogel	Fired	May 30	Steve Clifford	Charlotte Bobcats/Hornets head coach (2013–2018)	
April 13	Charlotte Hornets	Steve Clifford	Fired	May 10	James Borrego	San Antonio Spurs assistant coach (2015–2018)	
April 25	Atlanta Hawks	Mike Budenholzer	Mutually agreed to part ways.	May 11	Lloyd Pierce	Philadelphia 76ers assistant coach (2013–2018)	
April 29	Phoenix Suns	Jay Triano (interim)	Was not named permanent head coach.	May 2	Igor Kokoškov	Utah Jazz assistant coach (2015–2018)	
May 7	Detroit Pistons	Stan Van Gundy	Fired	June 11	Dwane Casey	Toronto Raptors head coach (2011–2018)	
May 11	Toronto Raptors	Dwane Casey	Fired	June 14	Nick Nurse	Toronto Raptors assistant coach (2013–2018)	
May 17	Milwaukee Bucks	Joe Prunty (interim)	Was not named permanent head coach.	May 17	Mike Budenholzer	Atlanta Hawks head coach (2013–2018)	

In-Season

Departure date	Team	Outgoing head coach	Reason for departure	Hire date	Incoming head coach	Last coaching position	Ref.
October 28	Cleveland Cavaliers	Tyronn Lue	Fired	October 28	Larry Drew	Cleveland Cavaliers assistant coach (2014–2018)	
December 3	Chicago Bulls	Fred Hoiberg	Fired	December 3	Jim Boylen (interim)	Chicago Bulls associate coach (2015–2018)	
January 6	Minnesota Timberwolves	Tom Thibodeau	Fired	January 6	Ryan Saunders (interim)	Minnesota Timberwolves assistant coach (2014–2019)	

=== General manager changes ===
Offseason

Departure date	Team	Outgoing general manager(s)	Reason for departure	Hire date	Incoming general manager(s)	Last managerial position(s)	Ref.
June 1	Detroit Pistons	Jeff Bower	Fired	June 1	Ed Stefanski (interim)	Memphis Grizzlies vice-president of player personnel (2014–2018)	
June 7 September 20	Philadelphia 76ers	Bryan Colangelo; Brett Brown (interim)	Resigned; Demoted	September 20	Elton Brand	Delaware 87ers/Blue Coats general manager (2017–2018)	
October 8	Phoenix Suns	Ryan McDonough	Fired	October 8	James Jones (interim); Trevor Bukstein (interim)	Phoenix Suns VP of basketball operations (2017–2018); Phoenix Suns assistant general manager (2013–2018)	

In-season

Departure date	Team	Outgoing general manager	Reason for departure	Hire date	Incoming general manager(s)	Last managerial position	Ref.
February 15	New Orleans Pelicans	Dell Demps	Fired	February 15	Danny Ferry (interim)	Atlanta Hawks general manager (2012–2015)	
April 2	Washington Wizards	Ernie Grunfeld	Fired	April 2	Tommy Sheppard (interim)	Washington Wizards current senior vice president of basketball operations	

== Player movements ==
=== Trades ===
June
June 21 (draft-day trades)	To Dallas Mavericks: Draft rights to Luka Dončić (No. 3)	To Atlanta Hawks: Draft rights to Trae Young (No. 5); 2019 Dallas protected first-round pick (Note: The Hawks will receive the Mavericks' pick if it is No. 6–30, else the pick will roll over to 2020 with the same condition, thence to 2021 (No. 4–30), 2022 (No. 4–30), and become unprotected in 2023.)
June 21 (draft-day trades)	To Phoenix Suns: Draft rights to Mikal Bridges (No. 10)	To Philadelphia 76ers: Draft rights to Zhaire Smith (No. 16); 2021 Miami first-round pick
June 21 (draft-day trades)	To Los Angeles Clippers: Draft rights to Shai Gilgeous-Alexander (No. 11)	To Charlotte Hornets: Draft rights to Miles Bridges (No. 12); 2020 Cleveland second-round pick; 2021 LA Clippers second-round pick
June 21 (draft-day trades)	To Charlotte Hornets: Draft rights to Devonte' Graham (No. 34)	To Atlanta Hawks: 2019 Charlotte second-round pick; 2023 Charlotte second-round pick
June 21 (draft-day trades)	To Portland Trail Blazers: Draft rights to Gary Trent Jr. (No. 37)	To Sacramento Kings: 2019 second-round pick (Note: The higher of the Lakers' or Minnesota's pick.); 2021 Miami second-round pick; Cash considerations
June 21 (draft-day trades)	To Detroit Pistons: Draft rights to Khyri Thomas (No. 38)	To Philadelphia 76ers: 2021 Detroit second-round pick; 2023 Detroit second-round pick
June 21 (draft-day trades)	To Denver Nuggets: Draft rights to Jarred Vanderbilt (No. 41)	To Orlando Magic: Draft rights to Justin Jackson (No. 43); 2019 second-round pick (Note: The lower of the picks originally belonging to Denver and Washington unless the Denver pick is No. 56–60, in which case it will go to Milwaukee and the Washington pick will be conveyed.)
June 21 (draft-day trades)	To Philadelphia 76ers: Draft rights to Shake Milton (No. 54)	To Dallas Mavericks: Draft rights to Ray Spalding (No. 56); Draft rights to Kostas Antetokounmpo (No. 60)
June 22	To Houston Rockets: Draft rights to Vincent Edwards (No. 52)	To Utah Jazz: Cash considerations
June 26	To Los Angeles Clippers: Marcin Gortat	To Washington Wizards: Austin Rivers
July
July 6	To Los Angeles Lakers: Draft rights to Isaac Bonga (No. 39)	To Philadelphia 76ers: 2019 Chicago second-round pick; Cash considerations
July 6	To Brooklyn Nets: Dwight Howard	To Charlotte Hornets: Timofey Mozgov; Draft rights to Hamidou Diallo (No. 45); 2021 Brooklyn second-round pick; Cash considerations
July 6	To Philadelphia 76ers: Wilson Chandler; 2021 Denver second-round pick; Right to swap 2022 second-round pick	To Denver Nuggets: Cash considerations
July 6	To Oklahoma City Thunder: Draft rights to Hamidou Diallo (No. 45)	To Charlotte Hornets: 2019 Oklahoma City second-round pick; Cash considerations
July 7	Three-team trade	
July 7	To Charlotte Hornets: Bismack Biyombo (from ORL); 2019 second-round pick (from ORL); 2020 second-round pick (Note: The lower of the picks originally belonging to Brooklyn and New York.) (from ORL)	To Chicago Bulls: Julyan Stone (from CHA)
July 7	To Orlando Magic: Jerian Grant (from CHI); Timofey Mozgov (from CHA)	
July 13	To Brooklyn Nets: 2020 Portland protected second-round pick (Note: Brooklyn will receive the pick if it is No. 56–60, else they receive nothing.); Draft rights to Isaïa Cordinier (2016 No. 44)	To Atlanta Hawks: Jeremy Lin; 2025 Brooklyn second-round pick; Right to swap 2023 second-round pick
July 13	To Brooklyn Nets: Kenneth Faried; Darrell Arthur; 2019 Denver first-round pick (Note: Brooklyn will receive the pick if it is No. 13–30, else they will receive Denver's 2020 pick.); 2020 Denver second-round pick	To Denver Nuggets: Isaiah Whitehead
July 17	To Memphis Grizzlies: Garrett Temple	To Sacramento Kings: Deyonta Davis; Ben McLemore; 2021 Memphis second-round pick; Cash considerations
July 18	To Toronto Raptors: Danny Green; Kawhi Leonard	To San Antonio Spurs: DeMar DeRozan; Jakob Pöltl; 2019 Toronto protected first-round pick (Note: San Antonio will receive the pick if it is No. 21–30, else they will receive Toronto's 2020 and 2023 second-round picks.)
July 20	To Brooklyn Nets: Jared Dudley; 2021 Phoenix protected second-round pick (Note: Brooklyn will receive the pick if it is No. 36–60.)	To Phoenix Suns: Darrell Arthur
July 20	To Philadelphia 76ers: Cash considerations	To Phoenix Suns: Richaun Holmes
July 20	To Oklahoma City Thunder: Rodney Purvis	To Orlando Magic: Dakari Johnson; Cash considerations
July 23	To Oklahoma City Thunder: Abdel Nader; Cash considerations	To Boston Celtics: Rodney Purvis
July 23	To Memphis Grizzlies: Dakari Johnson; Draft rights to Tyler Harvey	To Orlando Magic: Jarell Martin; Cash considerations
July 23	To Dallas Mavericks: Draft rights to Maarty Leunen; Cash considerations	To Los Angeles Clippers: Johnathan Motley^{†}; Draft rights to Renaldas Seibutis (2007 No. 50)
July 25	Three-team trade	
July 25	To Oklahoma City Thunder: Dennis Schröder (from ATL); Timothé Luwawu-Cabarrot (from PHI)	To Atlanta Hawks: Carmelo Anthony (from OKC); Justin Anderson (from PHI); 2022 Oklahoma City protected first-round pick (Note: Atlanta will receive the pick if it is No. 15–30, else they will receive the Thunder's second-round picks in 2024 and 2025.) (from OKC)
July 25	To Philadelphia 76ers: Mike Muscala (from ATL)	
August
August 2	To Houston Rockets: Draft rights to Maarty Leunen (2008 No. 54)	To Dallas Mavericks: Chinanu Onuaku; Cash considerations; Option to swap 2020 second-round picks
August 7	To Los Angeles Clippers: Draft rights to Vladimir Veremeenko (2006 No. 48)	To Cleveland Cavaliers: Sam Dekker; Cash considerations; Draft rights to Renaldas Seibutis (2007 No. 50)
August 31	To Houston Rockets: Brandon Knight; Marquese Chriss	To Phoenix Suns: Ryan Anderson; Draft rights to De'Anthony Melton (No. 46)
October
October 15	To Los Angeles Clippers: Alexis Ajinça	To New Orleans Pelicans: Wesley Johnson
October 15	To Milwaukee Bucks: Jodie Meeks; 2020 Washington protected second-round pick (Note: Milwaukee already owned Washington's 2020 second-round pick, protected No. 31–55. Milwaukee returned this pick and receive the same pick back but protected No. 31–45, with the Bucks receiving the Wizards' 2022 second-round pick if the 2020 pick is not conveyed.); Cash considerations	To Washington Wizards: 2020 Washington protected second-round pick
November
November 12	To Minnesota Timberwolves: Robert Covington; Dario Šarić; Jerryd Bayless; 2022 second-round pick (Note: Minnesota will receive the higher of the two picks originally belonging to Denver and Philadelphia.)	To Philadelphia 76ers: Jimmy Butler; Justin Patton
November 29	To Cleveland Cavaliers: Alec Burks; 2020 Utah second-round pick; 2021 Washington second-round pick	To Utah Jazz: Kyle Korver
December
December 7	Three-team trade	
December 7	To Cleveland Cavaliers: Matthew Dellavedova (from MIL); John Henson (from MIL); 2021 MIL protected first-round pick (Note: The Milwaukee pick cannot be conveyed two years after it sends its own first-round pick to Phoenix, which will happen in 2019 or 2020. Cleveland will receive the Bucks' pick if it is No. 15–30 in 2021, No. 11–30 in 2022, No. 11–30 in 2023, or No. 9–30 in 2024; if the pick is not conveyed by 2024 it will be converted to Milwaukee's 2024 and 2025 second-round picks.) (from MIL); 2021 MIL second-round pick (from MIL); 2022 WAS second-round pick (from WAS); Cash considerations (from WAS)	To Milwaukee Bucks: George Hill (from CLE); Jason Smith (from WAS); 2021 WAS second-round pick (Note: The Washington pick was originally traded to Utah in 2016, which traded it to Cleveland in November 2018.) (from CLE); draft considerations (Note: Washington removed the protection on its 2020 second-round pick sent to Milwaukee in the Jodie Meeks trade; this freed up Washington's 2022 second-round pick, which would have gone to Milwaukee if the 2020 pick had fallen into the protected range, to be traded to Chicago.)
December 7	To Washington Wizards: Sam Dekker (from CLE)	
December 17	To Phoenix Suns: Austin Rivers; Kelly Oubre Jr.	To Washington Wizards: Trevor Ariza
January
January 3	To Chicago Bulls: MarShon Brooks; Wayne Selden Jr.; 2019 Memphis second-round pick; 2020 Memphis second-round pick	To Memphis Grizzlies: Justin Holiday
January 7	To Chicago Bulls: Michael Carter-Williams; Cash considerations	To Houston Rockets: 2020 Memphis protected second-round pick (Note: If the pick is No. 56–60 it will go to Houston and Chicago will receive nothing; if it is No. 31–55 it will remain with Chicago and Houston will receive nothing.)
January 22	To Chicago Bulls: Carmelo Anthony; Draft rights to Jon Diebler (2011 No. 51); Cash considerations	To Houston Rockets: Draft rights to Tadija Dragićević (2008 No. 53)
January 31	To Dallas Mavericks: Trey Burke; Tim Hardaway Jr.; Courtney Lee; Kristaps Porziņģis	To New York Knicks: DeAndre Jordan; Wesley Matthews; Dennis Smith Jr.; Dallas first-round picks (Note: Dallas owes a protected first-round pick to Atlanta (to the Hawks if No. 6–30 2019/2020, No. 4–30 2021/2022, unprotected 2023). Two years after Dallas sends its pick to Atlanta it will convey its first-round pick to New York (earliest 2021, latest 2025). Two years after that (earliest 2023, latest 2025) Dallas will convey its first-round pick to New York if it is No. 11–30; if the second Dallas pick hasn't been conveyed to New York by 2025 it will convert to the Mavericks' 2025 second-round pick.); Dallas protected first-round pick
February
February 1	To Chicago Bulls: Timothé Luwawu-Cabarrot; Cash considerations	To Oklahoma City Thunder: 2020 Chicago protected second-round pick (Note: Oklahoma City will receive the pick if it is No. 56–60, else they receive nothing.)
February 4	To Cleveland Cavaliers: Wade Baldwin IV; Nik Stauskas; 2021 Portland second-round pick; 2023 Portland second-round pick	To Portland Trail Blazers: Rodney Hood
February 6	To Los Angeles Clippers: Wilson Chandler; Mike Muscala; Landry Shamet; 2020 Philadelphia protected first-round pick (Note: The Clippers will receive the Sixers' pick if it is No. 15–30, else it will roll over with the same condition through 2022; if the pick isn't conveyed by 2022 it will convert to Philadelphia's 2023 and 2024 second-round picks.); 2021 Miami first-round pick; 2021 Detroit second-round pick; 2023 Detroit second-round pick	To Philadelphia 76ers: Tobias Harris; Boban Marjanović; Mike Scott
February 6	To Detroit Pistons: Sviatoslav Mykhailiuk; 2021 Los Angeles Lakers second-round pick	To Los Angeles Lakers: Reggie Bullock; Cash considerations
February 6	To Philadelphia 76ers: Malachi Richardson; Draft rights to Emir Preldžić (2009 No. 57); 2022 Toronto second-round pick	To Toronto Raptors: Cash considerations
February 6	To Miami Heat: Ryan Anderson	To Phoenix Suns: Wayne Ellington; Tyler Johnson
February 6	To Chicago Bulls: Otto Porter	To Washington Wizards: Jabari Parker; Bobby Portis; 2023 Chicago protected second-round pick (Note: Washington will receive the pick if it is No. 37–60, else they receive nothing.)
February 7	To Sacramento Kings: Harrison Barnes	To Dallas Mavericks: Justin Jackson; Zach Randolph
February 7	To New Orleans Pelicans: Markieff Morris; 2023 Washington second-round pick	To Washington Wizards: Wesley Johnson
February 7	Three-team trade	
February 7	To Cleveland Cavaliers: Marquese Chriss (from HOU); Brandon Knight (from HOU); 2019 Houston protected first-round pick (Note: Cleveland will receive Houston's pick if it is No. 15–30, else it will roll over through 2023; if the pick is not conveyed by 2023 it will convert to Houston's 2024 and 2025 second-round picks.) (from HOU); 2022 Houston second-round pick (from HOU)	To Sacramento Kings: Alec Burks (from CLE); 2020 second-round pick (Note: If Houston's pick is No. 31–39 it will go to Sacramento; if the pick is No. 40–60 Dallas will have the right to swap Golden State's pick for Houston's pick and Sacramento will receive the remaining pick.) (from HOU)
February 7	To Houston Rockets: Wade Baldwin IV (from CLE); Iman Shumpert (from SAC); Nik Stauskas (from CLE); 2021 Milwaukee second-round pick (from CLE)	
February 7	To Sacramento Kings: Caleb Swanigan	To Portland Trail Blazers: Skal Labissière
February 7	To Los Angeles Clippers: JaMychal Green; Garrett Temple	To Memphis Grizzlies: Avery Bradley
February 7	To Orlando Magic: Markelle Fultz	To Philadelphia 76ers: Jonathon Simmons; 2019 second-round pick (Note: Philadelphia will the best of the four picks originally belonging to Cleveland, Houston, Orlando, and Portland.); 2020 Oklahoma City protected first-round pick (Note: Philadelphia will receive Oklahoma City's pick if it is No. 21–30, else it will convert to the Thunder's 2022 and 2023 second-round picks.)
February 7	To Brooklyn Nets: Greg Monroe; 2021 Toronto second-round pick	To Toronto Raptors: Cash considerations
February 7	Three-team trade	
February 7	To Milwaukee Bucks: Nikola Mirotić (from NO)	To Detroit Pistons: Thon Maker (from MIL)
February 7	To New Orleans Pelicans: Stanley Johnson (from DET); Jason Smith (from MIL); 2019 Denver protected second-round pick (Note: New Orleans will receive Denver's pick if No. 56–60, else they receive nothing.) (from MIL); 2020 Milwaukee second-round pick (from MIL); 2020 Washington second-round pick (from MIL); 2021 Washington second-round pick (from MIL)	
February 7	To Los Angeles Lakers: Mike Muscala	To Los Angeles Clippers: Michael Beasley; Ivica Zubac
February 7	To Toronto Raptors: Marc Gasol	To Memphis Grizzlies: CJ Miles; Jonas Valančiūnas; Delon Wright; 2024 Toronto second-round pick.
February 7	To Atlanta Hawks: Jabari Bird; Cash considerations	To Boston Celtics: 2020 Atlanta protected second-round pick (Note: Boston will Atlanta's pick if it is No. 56–60, else they receive nothing.)
February 7	To Indiana Pacers: Wade Baldwin IV; Nik Stauskas; Draft rights to Maarty Leunen (2008 No. 54); 2021 Milwaukee second-round pick	To Houston Rockets: Cash considerations
February 7	To Houston Rockets: Right to swap 2021 second-round picks	To Philadelphia 76ers: James Ennis III
February 7	To Atlanta Hawks: Shelvin Mack	To Memphis Grizzlies: Tyler Dorsey

- † Two-way contract

=== Free agents ===
Denotes unsigned players whose free-agent rights were renounced

Player	Date signed	New team	Former team	Ref
Derrick Jones Jr.***** (RFA)	July 1	Miami Heat		
Thomas Bryant	July 2	Washington Wizards (claimed off waivers)	Los Angeles Lakers (waived on June 30)	
Derrick Rose	July 2	Minnesota Timberwolves		
Brad Wanamaker	July 2	Boston Celtics	Fenerbahçe Doğuş (Turkey)	
Gary Clark	July 3	Houston Rockets	Cincinnati (undrafted in 2018)	
Nik Stauskas	July 5	Portland Trail Blazers	Brooklyn Nets	
Trevor Ariza	July 6	Phoenix Suns	Houston Rockets	
Aron Baynes	July 6	Boston Celtics		
Isaiah Briscoe	July 6	Orlando Magic	BC Kalev (Estonia)	
Kentavious Caldwell-Pope	July 6	Los Angeles Lakers		
Michael Carter-Williams	July 6	Houston Rockets	Charlotte Hornets	
DeMarcus Cousins	July 6	Golden State Warriors	New Orleans Pelicans	
Seth Curry	July 6	Portland Trail Blazers	Dallas Mavericks	
Tyreke Evans	July 6	Indiana Pacers	Memphis Grizzlies	
Dante Exum (RFA)	July 6	Utah Jazz		
Derrick Favors	July 6	Utah Jazz		
Paul George	July 6	Oklahoma City Thunder		
Aaron Gordon (RFA)	July 6	Orlando Magic		
Mario Hezonja	July 6	New York Knicks	Orlando Magic	
DeAndre Jordan	July 6	Dallas Mavericks	Los Angeles Clippers	
Luke Kornet***** (RFA)	July 6	New York Knicks		
Doug McDermott	July 6	Indiana Pacers	Dallas Mavericks	
Raul Neto (RFA)	July 6	Utah Jazz		
Nerlens Noel	July 6	Oklahoma City Thunder	Dallas Mavericks	
Jusuf Nurkić (RFA)	July 6	Portland Trail Blazers		
JJ Redick	July 6	Philadelphia 76ers		
Rajon Rondo	July 6	Los Angeles Lakers	New Orleans Pelicans	
Fred VanVleet (RFA)	July 6	Toronto Raptors		
José Calderón	July 7	Detroit Pistons	Cleveland Cavaliers	
Kevin Durant	July 7	Golden State Warriors		
Chris Paul	July 7	Houston Rockets		
Glenn Robinson	July 7	Detroit Pistons	Indiana Pacers	
Anthony Tolliver	July 7	Minnesota Timberwolves	Detroit Pistons	
Kyle Anderson (RFA)	July 8	Memphis Grizzlies	San Antonio Spurs	
Ian Clark	July 8	New Orleans Pelicans		
Elfrid Payton	July 8	New Orleans Pelicans	Phoenix Suns	
Julius Randle	July 8	New Orleans Pelicans	Los Angeles Lakers	
Will Barton	July 9	Denver Nuggets		
Avery Bradley	July 9	Los Angeles Clippers		
Torrey Craig***** (RFA)	July 9	Denver Nuggets		
Gerald Green	July 9	Houston Rockets		
LeBron James	July 9	Los Angeles Lakers	Cleveland Cavaliers	
Nikola Jokić (RFA)	July 9	Denver Nuggets		
Kyle O'Quinn	July 9	Indiana Pacers	New York Knicks	
Mike Scott	July 9	Los Angeles Clippers	Washington Wizards	
Jerami Grant	July 10	Oklahoma City Thunder		
Jeff Green	July 10	Washington Wizards	Cleveland Cavaliers	
Kevon Looney	July 10	Golden State Warriors		
Luc Mbah a Moute	July 10	Los Angeles Clippers	Houston Rockets	
JaVale McGee	July 10	Los Angeles Lakers	Golden State Warriors	
Lance Stephenson	July 10	Los Angeles Lakers	Indiana Pacers	
Dāvis Bertāns (RFA)	July 11	San Antonio Spurs		
Omri Casspi	July 11	Memphis Grizzlies	Golden State Warriors (waived on April 7)	
Raymond Felton	July 11	Oklahoma City Thunder		
Rudy Gay	July 11	San Antonio Spurs		
Dwight Howard	July 11	Washington Wizards	Brooklyn Nets (waived on July 7)	
Jonas Jerebko	July 12	Golden State Warriors	Utah Jazz (waived on July 7)	
Jairus Lyles	July 12	Utah Jazz	UMBC (undrafted in 2018)	
Braian Angola-Rodas	July 13	Orlando Magic	Florida State (undrafted in 2018)	
Wayne Ellington	July 13	Miami Heat		
James Ennis	July 13	Houston Rockets	Detroit Pistons	
Zach LaVine (RFA)	July 13	Chicago Bulls (matched offer sheet from Sacramento)		
Georges Niang***** (RFA)	July 13	Utah Jazz		
Kendrick Nunn	July 13	Golden State Warriors	Oakland (undrafted in 2018)	
Zaza Pachulia	July 13	Detroit Pistons	Golden State Warriors	
Jabari Parker	July 14	Chicago Bulls	Milwaukee Bucks	
Ersan İlyasova	July 16	Milwaukee Bucks	Philadelphia 76ers	
Amir Johnson	July 16	Philadelphia 76ers		
Elijah Stewart	July 16	Indiana Pacers	USC (undrafted in 2018)	
Isaiah Thomas	July 16	Denver Nuggets	Los Angeles Lakers	
Brook Lopez	July 17	Milwaukee Bucks	Los Angeles Lakers	
Shabazz Napier	July 17	Brooklyn Nets	Portland Trail Blazers	
Joel Berry II	July 18	Los Angeles Lakers	North Carolina (undrafted in 2018)	
Antonio Blakeney*****	July 19	Chicago Bulls (previously on a two-way contract)		
Dante Cunningham	July 19	San Antonio Spurs	Brooklyn Nets	
Channing Frye	July 19	Cleveland Cavaliers	Los Angeles Lakers	
Marcus Smart (RFA)	July 19	Boston Celtics		
Marco Belinelli	July 20	San Antonio Spurs	Philadelphia 76ers	
Nemanja Bjelica	July 20	Sacramento Kings	Minnesota Timberwolves	
Chris Boucher****	July 20	Toronto Raptors	Golden State Warriors (previously on a two-way contract)	
Lorenzo Brown	July 20	Toronto Raptors		
Jeffrey Carroll	July 20	Los Angeles Lakers	Oklahoma State (undrafted in 2018)	
Bryn Forbes (RFA)	July 20	San Antonio Spurs		
Garlon Green	July 20	New Orleans Pelicans	Belfius Mons-Hainaut (Belgium)	
Travis Trice	July 20	Milwaukee Bucks	Champville SC (Lebanon)	
Johnathan Williams	July 20	Los Angeles Lakers	Gonzaga (undrafted in 2018)	
Tony Parker	July 22	Charlotte Hornets	San Antonio Spurs	
Michael Beasley	July 23	Los Angeles Lakers	New York Knicks	
Antonius Cleveland	July 23	Chicago Bulls (claimed off waivers)	Atlanta Hawks (waived on July 21)	
Ed Davis	July 23	Brooklyn Nets	Portland Trail Blazers	
Ding Yanyuhang	July 23	Dallas Mavericks	Shandong Golden Stars (China)	
Yogi Ferrell	July 23	Sacramento Kings	Dallas Mavericks	
Dirk Nowitzki	July 23	Dallas Mavericks		
Kenrich Williams	July 23	New Orleans Pelicans	TCU (undrafted in 2018)	
Montrezl Harrell (RFA)	July 24	Los Angeles Clippers		
Joe Harris	July 24	Brooklyn Nets		
Noah Vonleh	July 24	New York Knicks	Chicago Bulls	
Kadeem Allen****	July 25	New York Knicks	Boston Celtics (previously on a two-way contract)	
Jaylen Barford	July 25	Charlotte Hornets	Arkansas (undrafted in 2018)	
Monté Morris*****	July 25	Denver Nuggets (previously on a two-way contract)		
Zach Smith	July 25	Charlotte Hornets	Texas Tech (undrafted in 2018)	
Isaiah Wilkins	July 25	Charlotte Hornets	Virginia (undrafted in 2018)	
Jabari Bird***** (RFA)	July 26	Boston Celtics		
Joe Chealey	July 26	Charlotte Hornets	College of Charleston (undrafted in 2018)	
Troy Williams	July 26	New Orleans Pelicans	New York Knicks (waived on July 16)	
Clint Capela (RFA)	July 27	Houston Rockets		
Johnny Hamilton	July 28	Detroit Pistons	Texas–Arlington (undrafted in 2018)	
Treveon Graham	July 30	Brooklyn Nets	Charlotte Hornets	
Theo Pinson	July 30	Brooklyn Nets	North Carolina (undrafted in 2018)	
Ryan Arcidiacono*****	July 31	Chicago Bulls		
Terry Larrier	July 31	Dallas Mavericks	Connecticut (undrafted in 2018)	
Brandon McCoy	July 31	Milwaukee Bucks	UNLV (undrafted in 2018)	
Jamel Artis****	August 1	Sacramento Kings	Orlando Magic	
Pat Connaughton	August 1	Milwaukee Bucks	Portland Trail Blazers	
Codi Miller-McIntyre	August 1	Dallas Mavericks	Parma Basket (Russia)	
Isaiah Canaan	August 2	Phoenix Suns (previously waived on February 8)		
Alex Len	August 3	Atlanta Hawks	Phoenix Suns	
Salah Mejri	August 3	Dallas Mavericks		
Norvel Pelle	August 3	Philadelphia 76ers	Fiat Torino (Italy)	
Ryan Broekhoff	August 6	Dallas Mavericks	PBC Lokomotiv Kuban (Russia)	
Malik Newman	August 6	Miami Heat	Los Angeles Lakers (previously on a two-way contract)	
Emanuel Terry	August 6	Denver Nuggets	Lincoln Memorial (undrafted in 2018)	
Jordan Barnett	August 7	Milwaukee Bucks	Missouri (undrafted in 2018)	
Shelvin Mack	August 7	Memphis Grizzlies	Orlando Magic (waived on June 25)	
James Nunnally	August 7	Minnesota Timberwolves	Fenerbahçe Doğuş (Turkey)	
Devin Harris	August 8	Dallas Mavericks	Denver Nuggets	
Jahlil Okafor	August 8	New Orleans Pelicans	Brooklyn Nets	
Markel Crawford	August 10	Memphis Grizzlies	Ole Miss (undrafted in 2018)	
Rob Gray	August 10	Houston Rockets	Houston (undrafted in 2018)	
Jalen Jones	August 10	Dallas Mavericks (waived on July 13)		
Zach Lofton	August 10	Detroit Pistons	New Mexico State (undrafted in 2018)	
Greg Monroe	August 10	Toronto Raptors	Boston Celtics	
Carmelo Anthony	August 13	Houston Rockets	Atlanta Hawks (waived on July 30)	
Marcus Derrickson	August 13	Golden State Warriors	Georgetown (undrafted in 2018)	
Derrick Walton****	August 14	Chicago Bulls	Miami Heat	
Marcus Lee	August 15	Miami Heat	California (undrafted in 2018)	
Isaac Haas	August 16	Utah Jazz	Purdue (undrafted in 2018)	
Isaiah Taylor	August 16	Cleveland Cavaliers	Atlanta Hawks (waived on June 30)	
Bruno Caboclo	August 20	Houston Rockets	Sacramento Kings	
Mitch Creek	August 20	Brooklyn Nets	s.Oliver Würzburg (Germany)	
Kay Felder****	August 20	Toronto Raptors	Detroit Pistons	
Daniel Hamilton****	August 20	Atlanta Hawks	Oklahoma City Thunder	
Danuel House****	August 20	Golden State Warriors	Phoenix Suns	
Jordan McLaughlin	August 20	Brooklyn Nets	USC (undrafted in 2018)	
Brianté Weber	August 21	Miami Heat	Memphis Grizzlies	
Vince Carter	August 24	Atlanta Hawks	Sacramento Kings	
Jarnell Stokes	August 27	Miami Heat	Zhejiang Golden Bulls (China)	
Trey Lewis	August 28	Utah Jazz	JL Bourg Basket (France)	
Anthony Brown****	August 28	Philadelphia 76ers	Minnesota Timberwolves	
Quincy Pondexter	August 29	San Antonio Spurs	Chicago Bulls (previously waived on February 1)	
Doral Moore	August 29	Memphis Grizzlies	Wake Forest (undrafted in 2018)	
Thomas Robinson	August 30	Atlanta Hawks	BC Khimki (Russia)	
Justin Bibbs	September 4	Boston Celtics	Virginia Tech (undrafted in 2018)	
Brandon Goodwin	September 4	Memphis Grizzlies	Florida Gulf Coast (undrafted in 2018)	
Nick King	September 4	Boston Celtics	Middle Tennessee (undrafted in 2018)	
Ben Moore*****	September 4	Indiana Pacers		
Darius Morris	September 4	New Orleans Pelicans	Rio Grande Valley Vipers (G League)	
Cameron Oliver	September 4	Portland Trail Blazers	Delaware 87ers (G League)	
Chinanu Onuaku	September 4	Portland Trail Blazers	Dallas Mavericks (waived on August 6)	
Gary Payton II*****	September 4	Portland Trail Blazers	Los Angeles Lakers	
Jeff Roberson	September 4	Boston Celtics	Vanderbilt (undrafted in 2018)	
B. J. Johnson	September 5	Orlando Magic	La Salle (undrafted in 2018)	
Alfonzo McKinnie	September 5	Golden State Warriors	Toronto Raptors (waived on July 17)	
Gabe York	September 5	Orlando Magic	Medi Bayreuth (Germany)	
Chris Chiozza	September 7	Washington Wizards	Florida (undrafted in 2018)	
R. J. Hunter****	September 7	Atlanta Hawks	Houston Rockets (previously on a two-way contract)	
Desi Rodriguez	September 7	Los Angeles Clippers	Seton Hall (undrafted in 2018)	
Tyrone Wallace***** (RFA)	September 7	Los Angeles Clippers		
David Nwaba	September 8	Cleveland Cavaliers	Chicago Bulls	
Rodney Hood (RFA)	September 9	Cleveland Cavaliers		
Luol Deng	September 10	Minnesota Timberwolves	Los Angeles Lakers (waived on September 1)	
Isaac Hamilton	September 10	Cleveland Cavaliers	Canton Charge (G League)	
Udonis Haslem	September 10	Miami Heat		
Tiwian Kendley	September 10	Washington Wizards	Morgan State (undrafted in 2018)	
Scoochie Smith	September 10	Cleveland Cavaliers	Canton Charge (G League)	
Deng Adel	September 13	Toronto Raptors	Louisville (undrafted in 2018)	
Kyle Collinsworth	September 13	Toronto Raptors	Dallas Mavericks (waived on July 6)	
JaCorey Williams	September 13	Cleveland Cavaliers	Hapoel Gilboa Galil (Israel)	
Bonzie Colson	September 14	Cleveland Cavaliers	Notre Dame (undrafted in 2018)	
Levi Randolph	September 14	Cleveland Cavaliers	SIG Strasbourg (France)	
Amida Brimah	September 17	San Antonio Spurs	Partizan NIS Belgrade (Serbia)	
Kaiser Gates	September 17	Chicago Bulls	Xavier (undrafted in 2018)	
Robert Johnson	September 17	Milwaukee Bucks	Indiana (undrafted in 2018)	
JaKarr Sampson	September 17	Chicago Bulls	Sacramento Kings	
Julian Washburn	September 17	San Antonio Spurs	Canterbury Rams (New Zealand)	
James Young (basketball)	September 17	Milwaukee Bucks	Philadelphia 76ers (waived on March 28)	
Cole Aldrich	September 18	Atlanta Hawks	Minnesota Timberwolves (waived on June 30)	
Lavoy Allen	September 18	Washington Wizards	Northern Arizona Suns (G League)	
Ike Nwamu	September 18	Milwaukee Bucks	Lavrio Megabolt (Greece)	
Dwyane Wade	September 18	Miami Heat		
Jarrett Jack	September 19	New Orleans Pelicans	New York Knicks	
Chasson Randle	September 19	Washington Wizards	Real Madrid Baloncesto (Spain)	
Kobi Simmons	September 19	Cleveland Cavaliers	Memphis Grizzlies (waived on August 28)	
Okaro White	September 20	San Antonio Spurs	Cleveland Cavaliers (waived on August 5)	
Tim Frazier	September 21	Milwaukee Bucks	Washington Wizards	
Omari Johnson	September 21	Indiana Pacers	Memphis Grizzlies (waived on June 24)	
Eric Moreland	September 21	Toronto Raptors	Detroit Pistons (waived on July 8)	
Shabazz Muhammad	September 21	Milwaukee Bucks		
Emeka Okafor	September 21	Philadelphia 76ers	New Orleans Pelicans (waived on September 19)	
Xavier Silas	September 21	Denver Nuggets	Boston Celtics (10-day contract ended on April 6)	
Christian Wood	September 21	Milwaukee Bucks	Delaware 87ers (G League)	
Scottie Lindsey	September 22	Detroit Pistons	Northwestern (undrafted in 2018)	
Bryce Alford	September 23	Oklahoma City Thunder	Oklahoma City Blue (G League)	
Abdul Gaddy	September 23	Oklahoma City Thunder	s.Oliver Würzburg (Germany)	
Darius Johnson-Odom	September 23	Minnesota Timberwolves	Vanoli Cremona (Italy)	
K.J. McDaniels	September 23	Oklahoma City Thunder	Grand Rapids Drive (G League)	
Richard Solomon	September 23	Oklahoma City Thunder	Uşak Sportif (Turkey)	
Jonathan Stark	September 23	Minnesota Timberwolves	Murray State (undrafted in 2018)	
Nick Johnson	September 24	San Antonio Spurs	Austin Spurs (G League)	
Ismaila Kane	September 24	Memphis Grizzlies	Atlanta Metropolitan (undrafted in 2018)	
Chris McCullough	September 24	Detroit Pistons	Washington Wizards	
Cameron Reynolds	September 24	Sacramento Kings	Tulane (undrafted in 2018)	
Tyler Ulis	September 24	Golden State Warriors	Phoenix Suns (waived on June 30)	
Nuni Omot	September 25	Brooklyn Nets	Baylor (undrafted in 2018)	
Tyrius Walker	September 25	New York Knicks	Morehouse (undrafted in 2018)	
Brandon Austin	September 26	Sacramento Kings	Reno Bighorns (G League)	
Donald Sloan (basketball)	September 26	Denver Nuggets	Washington Wizards	
Devin Davis	September 27	Orlando Magic	Houston (undrafted in 2018)	
Kalin Lucas	September 27	Sacramento Kings	Hapoel Jerusalem B.C. (Israel)	
Brandon McCoy	September 29	New Orleans Pelicans	Milwaukee Bucks (waived on September 17)	
Taren Sullivan	September 30	Sacramento Kings	Findlay (undrafted in 2018)	
Marcus Georges-Hunt	October 1	Boston Celtics	Minnesota Timberwolves	
Phillip Carr	October 2	New York Knicks	Morgan State (undrafted in 2018)	
Gabe Vincent	October 2	Sacramento Kings	UC Santa Barbara (undrafted in 2018)	
Isaiah Cousins	October 3	Utah Jazz	Cholet Basket (France)	
John Jenkins	October 3	New York Knicks	San Pablo Burgos (Spain)	
Billy Garrett Jr.	October 4	New York Knicks	Westchester Knicks (G League)	
Paul Watson (basketball)	October 5	New York Knicks	Westchester Knicks (G League)	
Jeff Coby	October 7	New York Knicks	Xuventude Baloncesto (Spain)	
Charles Cooke****	October 7	Miami Heat	New Orleans Pelicans	
DeAndre Liggins	October 7	Miami Heat	New Orleans Pelicans (waived on August 31)	
Will Cherry	October 8	Golden State Warriors	Cedevita Zagreb (Croatia)	
Isaac Humphries	October 8	Atlanta Hawks	KK FMP Beograd (Serbia)	
Donte Ingram	October 8	Dallas Mavericks	Loyola (IL) (undrafted in 2018)	
Rashad Vaughn	October 8	Dallas Mavericks	Orlando Magic (waived on March 7)	
C.J. Anderson (basketball)	October 9	Atlanta Hawks	UMass (undrafted in 2018)	
Josh Huestis	October 9	San Antonio Spurs	Oklahoma City Thunder	
Brandon Sampson	October 9	Houston Rockets	LSU (undrafted in 2018)	
Matt Farrell	October 10	Philadelphia 76ers	Notre Dame (undrafted in 2018)	
Donte Grantham	October 10	Oklahoma City Thunder	Clemson (undrafted in 2018)	
D. J. Hogg	October 10	Philadelphia 76ers	Texas A&M (undrafted in 2018)	
Scotty Hopson	October 10	Oklahoma City Thunder	Dallas Mavericks	
John Petrucelli	October 10	Orlando Magic	Lakeland Magic (G League)	
Ángel Rodríguez	October 10	Houston Rockets	Vaqueros de Bayamón (Puerto Rico)	
Dez Wells	October 10	Oklahoma City Thunder	Sidigas Avellino (Italy)	
Deyonta Davis	October 11	Golden State Warriors	Sacramento Kings (waived on September 22)	
Rodney Purvis	October 11	Miami Heat	Boston Celtics (waived on July 30)	
Raphiael Putney	October 11	Miami Heat	Atléticos de San Germán (Puerto Rico)	
Emanuel Terry	October 11	Cleveland Cavaliers	Denver Nuggets (waived on October 8)	
Jamel Artis	October 12	Los Angeles Clippers	Sacramento Kings (waived on October 7)	
Tim Bond (basketball)	October 12	Houston Rockets	Eastern Michigan (undrafted in 2018)	
Ding Yanyuhang	October 12	Dallas Mavericks (waived on October 12)		
Drew Gordon	October 12	Brooklyn Nets	BC Zenit Saint Petersburg (Russia)	
Cory Jefferson	October 12	Philadelphia 76ers	Pallacanestro Olimpia Milano (Italy)	
Darin Johnson	October 12	Philadelphia 76ers	Delaware 87ers (NBA G League)	
William Lee	October 12	Minnesota Timberwolves	UAB (undrafted in 2018)	
Scott Machado	October 12	Los Angeles Lakers	South Bay Lakers (G League)	
Alfonzo McKinnie	October 12	Golden State Warriors (previously on a two-way contract)		
Malcolm Miller	October 12	Toronto Raptors		
Tahjere McCall	October 12	Brooklyn Nets	Long Island Nets (G League)	
Shannon Scott	October 12	Brooklyn Nets	Panteras de Miranda (Venezuela)	
Canyon Barry	October 13	Minnesota Timberwolves	Brno (Czech Republic)	
Stephaun Branch	October 13	Indiana Pacers	Salt Lake City Stars (G League)	
Demetrius Denzel-Dyson	October 13	Indiana Pacers	Samford (undrafted in 2018)	
Oleksandr Kobets	October 13	Washington Wizards	Cherkaski Mavpy (Ukraine) (undrafted in 2018)	
Tyler Ulis	October 14	Chicago Bulls (claimed off waivers)	Golden State Warriors (waived on October 12)	
Jamal Crawford	October 16	Phoenix Suns	Minnesota Timberwolves	
Tim Frazier	October 17	New Orleans Pelicans (claimed off waivers)	Milwaukee Bucks (waived on October 15)	
Shaquille Harrison	October 21	Chicago Bulls	Phoenix Suns	
Chasson Randle	October 30	Washington Wizards	Capital City Go-Go (G League)	
Tyson Chandler	November 6	Los Angeles Lakers	Phoenix Suns (waived on November 4)	
Okaro White	November 23	Washington Wizards	San Antonio Spurs (waived on October 13)	
Danuel House	November 26	Houston Rockets	Rio Grande Valley Vipers (G League)	
Brandon Goodwin	November 29	Denver Nuggets	Memphis Hustle (G League)	
Joakim Noah	December 4	Memphis Grizzlies	New York Knicks (waived on October 13)	
Gary Clark*****	December 6	Houston Rockets (previously on a two-way contract)		
Eric Moreland	December 10	Phoenix Suns	Toronto Raptors (waived on October 12)	
Nick Young	December 10	Denver Nuggets	Golden State Warriors	
Allonzo Trier*****	December 13	New York Knicks (previously on a two-way contract)		
Chasson Randle	December 18	Washington Wizards	Capital City Go-Go (G League)	
Ron Baker	December 21	Washington Wizards	New York Knicks (waived on December 13)	
Austin Rivers	December 24	Houston Rockets	Phoenix Suns (waived on December 18)	
Patrick McCaw (RFA)	December 31	Cleveland Cavaliers	Golden State Warriors	
Cameron Payne	January 6	Cleveland Cavaliers (10-day contract)	Chicago Bulls (waived on January 3)	
Quincy Acy	January 7	Phoenix Suns (10-day contract)	Brooklyn Nets	
Patrick McCaw	January 10	Toronto Raptors	Cleveland Cavaliers (waived on January 6)	
Corey Brewer	January 15	Philadelphia 76ers (10-day contract)	Oklahoma City Thunder	
James Nunnally	January 16	Houston Rockets (10-day contract)	Minnesota Timberwolves (waived on January 6)	
Cameron Payne	January 16	Cleveland Cavaliers (second 10-day contract)		
Quincy Acy	January 17	Phoenix Suns (second 10-day contract)		
Stephan Hicks	January 20	Indiana Pacers (10-day contract)	Fort Wayne Mad Ants (G League)	
Kenneth Faried	January 21	Houston Rockets	Brooklyn Nets (waived on January 19)	
Gary Payton	January 21	Washington Wizards (10-day contract)	Rio Grande Valley Vipers (G League)	
Bruno Caboclo	January 24	Memphis Grizzlies (10-day contract)	Rio Grande Valley Vipers (G League)	
Corey Brewer	January 25	Philadelphia 76ers (second 10-day contract)		
Mitch Creek	January 25	Brooklyn Nets (10-day contract)	Long Island Nets (G League)	
Kobi Simmons	January 27	Cleveland Cavaliers (10-day contract)	Canton Charge (G League)	
Emanuel Terry	January 27	Phoenix Suns (10-day contract)	Sioux Falls Skyforce (G League)	
Isaiah Canaan	January 30	Minnesota Timberwolves (10-day contract)	Phoenix Suns (waived on November 28)	
John Jenkins	January 31	Washington Wizards (10-day contract)	Westchester Knicks (G League)	
Bruno Caboclo	February 3	Memphis Grizzlies (second 10-day contract)		
Mitch Creek	February 4	Brooklyn Nets (second 10-day contract)		
Corey Brewer	February 8	Sacramento Kings (10-day contract)	Philadelphia 76ers (2nd 10-day contract ended February 4)	
Wayne Ellington	February 9	Detroit Pistons (signed for rest of season)	Phoenix Suns (waived on February 7)	
Chris Boucher*****	February 10	Toronto Raptors (previously on a two-way contract)		
Isaiah Canaan	February 10	Minnesota Timberwolves (second 10-day contract)		
Shelvin Mack	February 10	Charlotte Hornets (claimed off waivers)	Atlanta Hawks (waived on February 8)	
Wesley Matthews	February 10	Indiana Pacers (signed for rest of season)	New York Knicks (waived on February 7)	
Salah Mejri	February 10	Dallas Mavericks (previously waived on February 7)		
Malcolm Miller	February 10	Toronto Raptors	Raptors 905 (G League)	
John Jenkins	February 11	New York Knicks (10-day contract)	Washington Wizards (10-day contract ended February 10)	
Nik Stauskas	February 11	Cleveland Cavaliers (signed for rest of season)	Indiana Pacers (waived on February 8)	
Edmond Sumner*****	February 11	Indiana Pacers (previously on a two-way contract)		
Bruno Caboclo	February 13	Memphis Grizzlies (signed for multi-year contract)		
Enes Kanter	February 13	Portland Trail Blazers (signed for rest of season)	New York Knicks (waived on February 8)	
Jeremy Lin	February 13	Toronto Raptors (signed for rest of season)	Atlanta Hawks (waived on February 11)	
Scotty Hopson	February 14	Oklahoma City Thunder (10-day contract)	Oklahoma City Blue (G League)	
Richard Solomon	February 14	Oklahoma City Thunder (10-day contract)	Oklahoma City Blue (G League)	
Corey Brewer	February 18	Sacramento Kings (second 10-day contract)		
Jaylen Adams*****	February 20	Atlanta Hawks (previously on a two-way contract)		
Henry Ellenson	February 20	New York Knicks (10-day contract)	Detroit Pistons (waived on February 9)	
Jodie Meeks	February 20	Toronto Raptors (10-day contract)	Milwaukee Bucks (waived on November 25)	
Markieff Morris	February 20	Oklahoma City Thunder (signed for rest of season)	New Orleans Pelicans (waived on February 8)	
Jordan Sibert	February 20	Atlanta Hawks (10-day contract)	Erie BayHawks (G League)	
Emanuel Terry	February 20	Miami Heat (10-day contract)	Sioux Falls Skyforce (G League)	
John Jenkins	February 21	New York Knicks (signed for multi-year contract)		
Ray Spalding	February 21	Phoenix Suns (10-day contract)	Dallas Mavericks (waived on January 31)	
Chris Chiozza	February 22	Houston Rockets (10-day contract)	Capital City Go-Go (G League)	
Terrence Jones	February 22	Houston Rockets (10-day contract)	Erie BayHawks (G League)	
Isaiah Canaan	February 25	Milwaukee Bucks (10-day contract)	Minnesota Timberwolves (2nd 10-day contract ended February 23)	
Tahjere McCall	February 26	Brooklyn Nets (10-day contract)	Long Island Nets (G League)	
Cameron Reynolds	February 27	Minnesota Timberwolves (10-day contract)	Stockton Kings (G League)	
Corey Brewer	February 28	Sacramento Kings (signed for rest of season)		
Dairis Bertāns	March 1	New Orleans Pelicans	Olimpia Milan (Italy)	
B. J. Johnson	March 1	Atlanta Hawks (10-day contract)	Lakeland Magic (G League)	
Henry Ellenson	March 2	New York Knicks (signed for rest of season)		
Pau Gasol	March 3	Milwaukee Bucks	San Antonio Spurs (waived on March 1)	
Ray Spalding	March 3	Phoenix Suns (signed for rest of season)		
Terrence Jones	March 4	Houston Rockets (second 10-day contract)		
Andrew Bogut	March 6	Golden State Warriors	Sydney Kings (Australia)	
Tyler Zeller	March 8	Atlanta Hawks (10-day contract)	Milwaukee Bucks (waived on October 13)	
Cameron Reynolds	March 9	Minnesota Timberwolves (second 10-day contract)		
Deonte Burton*****	March 10	Oklahoma City Thunder (previously on a two-way contract)		
Andre Ingram	March 11	Los Angeles Lakers (10-day contract)	South Bay Lakers (G League)	
B. J. Johnson	March 12	Atlanta Hawks (second 10-day contract)		
Justin Bibbs	March 13	Los Angeles Clippers (10-day contract)	Maine Red Claws (G League)	
Danuel House*****	March 13	Houston Rockets (previously on a two-way contract)		
Eric Moreland	March 14	Toronto Raptors (10-day contract)	Phoenix Suns (waived on January 3)	
Michael Carter-Williams	March 15	Orlando Magic (10-day contract)	Chicago Bulls (waived on January 7)	
Charles Cooke	March 15	Miami Heat (10-day contract)	Sioux Falls Skyforce (G League)	
Deyonta Davis	March 19	Atlanta Hawks (10-day contract)	Santa Cruz Warriors (G League)	
Tim Frazier	March 19	Milwaukee Bucks	New Orleans Pelicans (waived on February 28)	
Cameron Reynolds	March 19	Minnesota Timberwolves (signed for multi-year contract)		
Christian Wood	March 20	New Orleans Pelicans (claimed off waivers)	Milwaukee Bucks (waived on March 18)	
Scott Machado	March 21	Los Angeles Lakers (10-day contract)	South Bay Lakers (G League)	
Cody Demps	March 22	Sacramento Kings (10-day contract)	Stockton Kings (G League)	
Jimmer Fredette	March 22	Phoenix Suns (signed for rest of season)	Shanghai Sharks (China)	
Justin Bibbs	March 23	Los Angeles Clippers (second 10-day contract)		
Chris Chiozza	March 23	Houston Rockets (signed for rest of season)	Capital City Go-Go (G League)	
Greg Monroe	March 24	Boston Celtics (10-day contract)	Brooklyn Nets (waived on February 7)	
Michael Carter-Williams	March 25	Orlando Magic (second 10-day contract)		
Jodie Meeks	March 26	Toronto Raptors (signed for rest of season / 10-day contract ended March 2)		
Deyonta Davis	March 29	Atlanta Hawks (second 10-day contract)		
Walter Lemon Jr.	March 29	Chicago Bulls (signed for rest of season)	Windy City Bulls (G League)	
Mitch Creek	March 30	Minnesota Timberwolves (10-day contract)	Long Island Nets (G League)	
Dusty Hannahs	March 30	Memphis Grizzlies (10-day contract)	Memphis Hustle (G League)	
Jemerrio Jones	March 31	Los Angeles Lakers (signed for multi-year contract)	South Bay Lakers (G League)	
JaKarr Sampson	March 31	Chicago Bulls (10-day contract)	Windy City Bulls (G League)	
Isaac Humphries	April 1	Atlanta Hawks (signed for rest of season)	Erie BayHawks (G League)	
B. J. Johnson	April 1	Sacramento Kings (signed for rest of season)	Lakeland Magic (G League)	
Billy Garrett Jr.	April 2	New York Knicks (signed for multi-year contract)	Westchester Knicks (G League)	
Michael Carter-Williams	April 4	Orlando Magic (signed for rest of season)		
Greg Monroe	April 4	Philadelphia 76ers (signed for rest of season)	Boston Celtics (10-day contract ended April 3)	
Donatas Motiejūnas	April 4	San Antonio Spurs (signed for rest of season)	Shandong Golden Stars (China)	
Tyler Zeller	April 5	Memphis Grizzlies (signed for rest of season)	Atlanta Hawks (10-day contract ended March 18)	
Michael Frazier II	April 6	Houston Rockets (signed for rest of season)	Rio Grande Valley Vipers (G League)	
Yante Maten*****	April 7	Miami Heat (previously on a two-way contract)		
Deyonta Davis	April 8	Atlanta Hawks (signed for multi-year contract)		
Mitch Creek	April 9	Minnesota Timberwolves (signed for multi-year contract)		
Jonathan Gibson	April 9	Boston Celtics (signed for rest of season)	Qingdao DoubleStar Eagles (China)	
Rodney McGruder	April 9	Los Angeles Clippers (claimed off waivers)	Miami Heat (waived on April 7)	
Jordan McRae*****	April 9	Washington Wizards (previously on a two-way contract)		
Eric Moreland	April 9	Toronto Raptors (signed for rest of season / 10-day contract ended March 23)		
Tarik Phillip	April 9	Washington Wizards (signed for multi-year contract)	Memphis Hustle (G League)	
Duncan Robinson*****	April 9	Miami Heat (previously on a two-way contract)		
Kendrick Nunn	April 10	Miami Heat (signed for rest of season)	Santa Cruz Warriors (G League)	
Theo Pinson*****	April 10	Brooklyn Nets (previously on a two-way contract)		
Deyonta Davis	June 12	Houston Rockets (claimed off waivers)	Atlanta Hawks (waived on June 10)	
Arron Afflalo			Orlando Magic	
Luke Babbitt			Miami Heat	
Jameer Nelson			Detroit Pistons	
Marshall Plumlee****			Milwaukee Bucks	
Jason Terry			Milwaukee Bucks	

* Player option
** Team option
*** Early termination option
**** Previously on a two-way contract
***** Converted two-way contract to full contract

=== Two-way contracts ===
Per recent NBA rules implemented as of the 2017–18 season, teams are permitted to have two two-way players on their roster at any given time, in addition to their 15-man regular season roster. A two-way player will provide services primarily to the team's G League affiliate, but can spend up to 45 days with the parent NBA team. Only players with four or fewer years of NBA experience are able to sign two-way contracts, which can be for either one season or two. Players entering training camp for a team have a chance to convert their training camp deal into a two-way contract if they prove themselves worthy enough for it. Teams also have the option to convert a two-way contract into a regular, minimum-salary NBA contract, at which point the player becomes a regular member of the parent NBA team. Two-way players are not eligible for NBA playoff rosters, so a team must convert any two-way players it wants to use in the playoffs, waiving another player in the process. Two-way contracts must be signed prior to January 15, with their salaries being fully guaranteed on January 20.

Player	Date signed	Team	School / club team	Ref
Jaylen Adams	July 1	Atlanta Hawks	St. Bonaventure (undrafted in 2018)	
Malik Newman	July 1	Los Angeles Lakers	Kansas (undrafted in 2018)	
George King	July 2	Phoenix Suns	Colorado	
J. P. Macura	July 2	Charlotte Hornets	Xavier (undrafted in 2018)	
Isaiah Hicks (RFA)	July 3	New York Knicks		
Allonzo Trier	July 3	New York Knicks	Arizona (undrafted in 2018)	
Ángel Delgado	July 5	Los Angeles Clippers	Seton Hall (undrafted in 2018)	
Jared Terrell	July 5	Minnesota Timberwolves	Rhode Island (undrafted in 2018)	
Deonte Burton	July 6	Oklahoma City Thunder	Wonju DB Promy (South Korea)	
Billy Preston	July 6	Cleveland Cavaliers	Igokea (Bosnia and Herzegovina) (undrafted in 2018)	
Troy Caupain	July 10	Orlando Magic	G.S.A. Udine (Italy)	
Duncan Robinson	July 10	Miami Heat	Michigan (undrafted in 2018)	
Kostas Antetokounmpo	July 13	Dallas Mavericks	Dayton	
Damion Lee	July 13	Golden State Warriors	Atlanta Hawks	
Naz Mitrou-Long	July 14	Utah Jazz	Salt Lake City Stars (G League)	
Keenan Evans	July 15	Detroit Pistons	Texas Tech (undrafted in 2018)	
Trevon Bluiett	July 17	New Orleans Pelicans	Xavier (undrafted in 2018)	
Thomas Welsh	July 19	Denver Nuggets	UCLA	
Yuta Watanabe	July 20	Memphis Grizzlies	George Washington (undrafted in 2018)	
Trevon Duval	July 24	Milwaukee Bucks	Duke (undrafted in 2018)	
Travis Wear	July 24	Los Angeles Lakers		
Rawle Alkins	July 25	Chicago Bulls	Arizona (undrafted in 2018)	
Walt Lemon Jr.	July 25	Boston Celtics	Fort Wayne Mad Ants (G League)	
Shake Milton	July 26	Philadelphia 76ers	SMU	
Jaylen Morris	July 26	Milwaukee Bucks	Fiat Torino (Italy)	
Demetrius Jackson	July 27	Philadelphia 76ers		
Yante Maten	July 29	Miami Heat	Georgia (undrafted in 2018)	
Daryl Macon	July 30	Dallas Mavericks	Arkansas (undrafted in 2018)	
Wenyen Gabriel	July 31	Sacramento Kings	Kentucky (undrafted in 2018)	
C. J. Williams	July 31	Minnesota Timberwolves	Los Angeles Clippers (waived on July 27)	
Tyler Cavanaugh	August 1	Utah Jazz	Atlanta Hawks (waived on May 11)	
C. J. Wilcox	August 3	Indiana Pacers	Portland Trail Blazers	
Jordan Loyd	August 3	Toronto Raptors	Darüşşafaka (Turkey)	
DeVaughn Akoon-Purcell	August 6	Denver Nuggets	Bakken Bears (Denmark)	
Amile Jefferson	August 7	Orlando Magic	Minnesota Timberwolves	
Tyler Davis	August 13	Oklahoma City Thunder	Texas A&M (undrafted in 2018)	
Alex Poythress	August 20	Atlanta Hawks	Indiana Pacers (waived on July 6)	
PJ Dozier	August 21	Boston Celtics	Oklahoma City Thunder	
Jordan McRae	September 10	Washington Wizards	Saski Baskonia (Spain)	
Drew Eubanks	September 20	San Antonio Spurs	Oregon State (undrafted in 2018)	
Alan Williams	September 24	Brooklyn Nets	Phoenix Suns (waived on July 2)	
D. J. Stephens	October 8	Memphis Grizzlies	Le Mans Sarthe Basket (France)	
Theo Pinson°	October 11	Brooklyn Nets	North Carolina (undrafted in 2018)	
Alfonzo McKinnie°	October 11	Golden State Warriors	Toronto Raptors (waived on July 17)	
Chris Boucher°	October 12	Toronto Raptors	Golden State Warriors	
Joe Chealey°	October 13	Charlotte Hornets	College of Charleston (undrafted in 2018)	
Marcus Derrickson°	October 13	Golden State Warriors	Georgetown (undrafted in 2018)	
Gary Clark°	October 15	Houston Rockets	Cincinnati (undrafted in 2018)	
Vincent Edwards°	October 15	Houston Rockets	Purdue	
Zach Lofton°	October 15	Detroit Pistons	New Mexico State (undrafted in 2018)	
Tyler Ulis	October 15	Chicago Bulls (claimed off waivers)	Golden State Warriors (waived on October 12)	
Davon Reed	October 19	Indiana Pacers	Phoenix Suns (waived on October 17)	
Johnathan Williams	October 19	Los Angeles Lakers (previously waived on October 13)		
Troy Williams	October 19	Sacramento Kings	New Orleans Pelicans (waived on October 16)	
Andrew Harrison	November 9	Cleveland Cavaliers	Memphis Grizzlies (waived on November 1)	
Ben Moore	November 20	San Antonio Spurs	Fort Wayne Mad Ants (G League)	
Jalen Jones	December 2	Cleveland Cavaliers	Dallas Mavericks (waived on July 13)	
Jaron Blossomgame	December 2	Cleveland Cavaliers	Canton Charge (G League)	
Andrew Harrison	December 5	New Orleans Pelicans	Cleveland Cavaliers (waived on December 2)	
Danuel House	December 6	Houston Rockets (previously waived on December 4)		
Jawun Evans	December 7	Phoenix Suns	Northern Arizona Suns (G League)	
Brandon Goodwin	December 16	Denver Nuggets	Memphis Hustle (G League)	
Brandon Sampson	December 26	Chicago Bulls	Rio Grande Valley Vipers (G League)	
Donte Grantham	December 28	Oklahoma City Thunder	Oklahoma City Blue (G League)	
Jarnell Stokes	January 1	Memphis Grizzlies	Sioux Falls Skyforce (G League)	
Haywood Highsmith	January 8	Philadelphia 76ers	Delaware Blue Coats (G League)	
R. J. Hunter	January 10	Boston Celtics	Erie BayHawks (G League)	
Alan Williams	January 11	Brooklyn Nets (previously waived on January 2)		
Kadeem Allen	January 14	New York Knicks	Westchester Knicks (G League)	
Deng Adel	January 15	Cleveland Cavaliers	Raptors 905 (G League)	
Bonzie Colson	January 15	Milwaukee Bucks	Canton Charge (G League)	
Kalin Lucas	January 15	Detroit Pistons	Stockton Kings (G League)	
Julian Washburn	January 15	Memphis Grizzlies	Austin Spurs (G League)	
Isaiah Whitehead	January 15	Detroit Pistons	Lokomotiv Kuban (Russia)	
Jawun Evans	March 25	Oklahoma City Thunder (claimed off waivers)	Phoenix Suns (waived on March 23)	
Trevon Duval	March 26	Houston Rockets (claimed off waivers)	Milwaukee Bucks (waived on March 24)	

- °Training camp conversion

=== Going to other North American leagues ===
*	Denotes G League players who returned to their former team

Player	Date signed	New team	New league	NBA team	NBA contract status	Ref
Marcus Georges-Hunt*	October 20	Maine Red Claws	NBA G League	Boston Celtics	Unrestricted free agent	
Andre Ingram*	October 20	South Bay Lakers	NBA G League	Los Angeles Lakers	Unrestricted free agent	
Malcolm Miller*	October 20	Raptors 905	NBA G League	Toronto Raptors	Unrestricted free agent	
Chinanu Onuaku	October 20	Greensboro Swarm	NBA G League	Portland Trail Blazers	Unrestricted free agent	
Willie Reed	October 20	Salt Lake City Stars	NBA G League	Chicago Bulls	Unrestricted free agent	
Xavier Silas	November 2	Iowa Wolves	NBA G League	Denver Nuggets	Unrestricted free agent	
Jawun Evans	November 4	Northern Arizona Suns	NBA G League	Los Angeles Clippers	Unrestricted free agent	
Chasson Randle*	November 15	Capital City Go-Go	NBA G League	Washington Wizards	Unrestricted free agent	
John Holland	November 20	Austin Spurs	NBA G League	Cleveland Cavaliers	Unrestricted free agent	
Travis Wear*	November 27	South Bay Lakers	NBA G League	Los Angeles Lakers	Unrestricted free agent	
Glen Davis	December 6	St. John's Edge	NBL Canada	Los Angeles Clippers	Unrestricted free agent	
Brandon Goodwin*	December 13	Memphis Hustle	NBA G League	Denver Nuggets	Unrestricted free agent	
Okaro White	January 4	Long Island Nets	NBA G League	Washington Wizards	Unrestricted free agent	
Zach Lofton*	January 20	Grand Rapids Drive	NBA G League	Detroit Pistons	Unrestricted free agent	
Jaylen Morris*	January 28	Erie BayHawks	NBA G League	Milwaukee Bucks	Unrestricted free agent	
Stephan Hicks*	January 29	Fort Wayne Mad Ants	NBA G League	Indiana Pacers	Unrestricted free agent	
Mitch Creek*	February 8	Long Island Nets	NBA G League	Brooklyn Nets	Unrestricted free agent	
Emanuel Terry*	February 8	Sioux Falls Skyforce	NBA G League	Phoenix Suns	Unrestricted free agent	
Quincy Acy*	February 24	Texas Legends	NBA G League	Phoenix Suns	Unrestricted free agent	
Wade Baldwin IV	February 25	Raptors 905	NBA G League	Indiana Pacers	Unrestricted free agent	
Spencer Hawes	March 2	South Bay Lakers	NBA G League	Milwaukee Bucks	Unrestricted free agent	
Jordan Sibert*	March 3	Erie BayHawks	NBA G League	Atlanta Hawks	Unrestricted free agent	
Chris Chiozza	March 5	Capital City Go-Go	NBA G League	Houston Rockets	Unrestricted free agent	
Jarrett Jack	March 5	Sioux Falls Skyforce	NBA G League	New Orleans Pelicans	Unrestricted free agent	
Tahjere McCall*	March 8	Long Island Nets	NBA G League	Brooklyn Nets	Unrestricted free agent	
Emanuel Terry*	March 9	Sioux Falls Skyforce	NBA G League	Miami Heat	Unrestricted free agent	
Malachi Richardson	March 13	Canton Charge	NBA G League	Philadelphia 76ers	Unrestricted free agent	
Terrence Jones*	March 14	Erie BayHawks	NBA G League	Houston Rockets	Unrestricted free agent	
Andre Ingram*	March 21	South Bay Lakers	NBA G League	Los Angeles Lakers	Unrestricted free agent	
B. J. Johnson*	March 23	Lakeland Magic	NBA G League	Atlanta Hawks	Unrestricted free agent	

=== Going overseas ===
*	Denotes international players who returned to their home country

Player	Date signed	New team	New country	NBA team	NBA contract status	Ref
Marreese Speights	July 2	Guangzhou Long-Lions	China	Orlando Magic	Unrestricted free agent	
Joffrey Lauvergne	July 4	Fenerbahçe	Turkey	San Antonio Spurs	Unrestricted free agent	
Al Jefferson	July 7	Xinjiang Flying Tigers	China	Indiana Pacers	Unrestricted free agent	
Marcus Paige^{†}	July 11	Partizan Belgrade	Serbia	Charlotte Hornets	Unrestricted free agent	
James Michael McAdoo	July 15	Fiat Torino	Italy	Philadelphia 76ers	Unrestricted free agent	
Tyler Ennis	July 19	Fenerbahçe	Turkey	Los Angeles Lakers	Unrestricted free agent	
Tony Carr	July 20	Fiat Torino	Italy	New Orleans Pelicans	Unsigned draft pick	
Georgios Papagiannis*	July 20	Panathinaikos	Greece	Portland Trail Blazers	Unrestricted free agent	
Jaylen Morris	July 22	Fiat Torino	Italy	Atlanta Hawks	Unrestricted free agent	
Myke Henry^{†}	July 23	Ironi Nahariya	Israel	Memphis Grizzlies	Unrestricted free agent	
Alec Peters^{†}	July 23	CSKA Moscow	Russia	Phoenix Suns	Unrestricted free agent	
London Perrantes^{†}	July 24	Limoges CSP	France	Cleveland Cavaliers	Unrestricted free agent	
Jeff Withey	July 24	Tofaş	Turkey	Dallas Mavericks	Unrestricted free agent	
Markel Brown^{†}	July 25	Darüşşafaka	Turkey	Houston Rockets	Unrestricted free agent	
Julyan Stone	July 25	Reyer Venezia	Italy	Chicago Bulls	Unrestricted free agent	
Shane Larkin	July 26	Anadolu Efes	Turkey	Boston Celtics	Unrestricted free agent	
Jack Cooley^{†}	July 27	Dinamo Sassari	Italy	Sacramento Kings	Unrestricted free agent	
Josh Magette^{†}	July 27	KK Cedevita	Croatia	Atlanta Hawks	Unrestricted free agent	
Jordan Mickey	July 27	Khimki	Russia	Miami Heat	Unrestricted free agent	
Malcolm Delaney	July 28	Guangdong Southern Tigers	China	Atlanta Hawks	Unrestricted free agent	
Johnny O'Bryant III	July 31	Maccabi Tel Aviv	Israel	New York Knicks	Unrestricted free agent	
Erik McCree^{†}	August 1	VL Pesaro	Italy	Utah Jazz	Unrestricted free agent	
Joe Young	August 1	Nanjing Monkey King	China	Indiana Pacers	Unrestricted free agent	
David Stockton	August 2	Medi Bayreuth	Germany	Utah Jazz	Unrestricted free agent	
Andrew White^{†}	August 2	Afyon Belediye	Turkey	Atlanta Hawks	Unrestricted free agent	
Matt Costello^{†}	August 4	Sidigas Avellino	Italy	San Antonio Spurs	Unrestricted free agent	
Isaiah Whitehead	August 6	PBC Lokomotiv Kuban	Russia	Denver Nuggets	Unrestricted free agent	
Milton Doyle^{†}	August 8	CB Murcia	Spain	Brooklyn Nets	Unrestricted free agent	
Devon Hall	August 11	Cairns Taipans	Australia	Oklahoma City Thunder	Unsigned draft pick	
Darrun Hilliard^{†}	August 13	Saski Baskonia	Spain	San Antonio Spurs	Restricted free agent	
Tarik Black	August 20	Maccabi Tel Aviv	Israel	Houston Rockets	Unrestricted free agent	
Brandon Jennings	August 20	Zenit Saint Petersburg	Russia	Milwaukee Bucks	Unrestricted free agent	
Jeremy Evans	August 21	Darüşşafaka	Turkey	Atlanta Hawks	Unrestricted free agent	
Mangok Mathiang^{†}	August 22	Vanoli Cremona	Italy	Charlotte Hornets	Unrestricted free agent	
James Webb III^{†}	August 23	Telekom Baskets Bonn	Germany	Brooklyn Nets	Unrestricted free agent	
Le'Bryan Nash	August 24	Tokyo Hachioji Bee Trains	Japan	Houston Rockets	Unrestricted free agent	
Nigel Hayes	August 29	Galatasaray Odeabank	Turkey	Sacramento Kings	Unrestricted free agent	
Marquis Teague	August 30	Jeonju KCC Egis	Korea	Memphis Grizzlies	Unrestricted free agent	
Aaron Harrison	September 5	Galatasaray Odeabank	Turkey	Dallas Mavericks	Unrestricted free agent	
Jonathan Gibson	September 11	Qingdao Eagles	China	Boston Celtics	Unrestricted free agent	
Dakari Johnson	September 11	Qingdao Eagles	China	Memphis Grizzlies	Unrestricted free agent	
Lucas Nogueira	September 17	Montakit Fuenlabrada	Spain	Toronto Raptors	Unrestricted free agent	
Kyle Singler	September 30	Monbus Obradoiro	Spain	Oklahoma City Thunder	Unrestricted free agent	
Derrick Williams	October 3	Bayern Munich	Germany	Los Angeles Lakers	Unrestricted free agent	
Chris McCullough	October 8	Shanxi Brave Dragons	China	Detroit Pistons	Unrestricted free agent	
Cole Aldrich	October 10	Tianjin Gold Lions	China	Atlanta Hawks	Unrestricted free agent	
Shabazz Muhammad	October 12	Shanxi Brave Dragons	China	Milwaukee Bucks	Unrestricted free agent	
Derrick Walton	October 18	Žalgiris Kaunas	Lithuania	Chicago Bulls	Unrestricted free agent	
Anthony Brown	October 23	Partizan	Serbia	Philadelphia 76ers	Unrestricted free agent	
Ramon Sessions	November 3	Maccabi Tel Aviv	Israel	Washington Wizards	Unrestricted free agent	
Garlon Green	November 8	Khimki	Russia	New Orleans Pelicans	Unrestricted free agent	
Jordan Crawford	November 19	Alba Berlin	Germany	New Orleans Pelicans	Unrestricted free agent	
Tim Quarterman	November 22	Ironi Nahariya	Israel	Houston Rockets	Unrestricted free agent	
Ty Lawson	December 15	Shandong Golden Stars	China	Washington Wizards	Unrestricted free agent	
DeVaughn Akoon-Purcell^{†}	December 19	Hapoel Tel Aviv	Israel	Denver Nuggets	Unrestricted free agent	
Xavier Munford	December 23	Fujian Sturgeons	China	Milwaukee Bucks	Unrestricted free agent	
Alexis Ajinça*	December 28	ASVEL Basket	France	Los Angeles Clippers	Unrestricted free agent	
Brandon Paul	December 28	Zhejiang Golden Bulls	China	San Antonio Spurs	Unrestricted free agent	
Demetrius Jackson^{†}	January 9	Beijing Ducks	China	Philadelphia 76ers	Unrestricted free agent	
Sean Kilpatrick	January 9	Panathinaikos	Greece	Chicago Bulls	Unrestricted free agent	
Paul Zipser	January 17	San Pablo Burgos	Spain	Chicago Bulls	Unrestricted free agent	
Jalen Jones	January 22	Kirolbet Baskonia	Spain	Cleveland Cavaliers	Unrestricted free agent	
James Nunnally	January 27	AX Armani Exchange Olimpia Milan	Italy	Houston Rockets	Unrestricted free agent	
Lorenzo Brown	February 10	Guangzhou Long-Lions	China	Toronto Raptors	Unrestricted free agent	
Brice Johnson	February 19	Indios de Mayagüez	Puerto Rico	Memphis Grizzlies	Unrestricted free agent	
Michael Beasley	February 20	Guangdong Southern Tigers	China	Los Angeles Clippers	Unrestricted free agent	
MarShon Brooks	February 20	Guangdong Southern Tigers	China	Chicago Bulls	Unrestricted free agent	
Andrew Harrison	February 27	Khimki	Russia	New Orleans Pelicans	Unrestricted free agent	
Mario Chalmers	March 3	Virtus Segafredo	Italy	Memphis Grizzlies	Unrestricted free agent	

=== Waived ===
Player	Date waived	Former team	Ref
Tyler Cavanaugh	May 11	Atlanta Hawks	
London Perrantes^{†}	June 12	Cleveland Cavaliers	
Chris Boucher^{†}	June 22	Golden State Warriors	
Omari Johnson	June 24	Memphis Grizzlies	
Shelvin Mack	June 25	Orlando Magic	
Tyler Ennis	June 28	Los Angeles Lakers	
Cole Aldrich	June 30	Minnesota Timberwolves	
Thomas Bryant	June 30	Los Angeles Lakers	
Isaiah Taylor	June 30	Atlanta Hawks	
Tyler Ulis	June 30	Phoenix Suns	
Al Jefferson	July 2	Indiana Pacers	
Alan Williams	July 2	Phoenix Suns	
Aaron Jackson	July 5	Houston Rockets	
Kyle Collinsworth	July 6	Dallas Mavericks	
Nigel Hayes	July 6	Sacramento Kings	
Alex Poythress	July 6	Indiana Pacers	
Dwight Buycks	July 7	Detroit Pistons	
Dwight Howard	July 7	Brooklyn Nets	
Jonas Jerebko	July 7	Utah Jazz	
Eric Moreland	July 8	Detroit Pistons	
Sean Kilpatrick	July 12	Chicago Bulls	
Jalen Jones^{†}	July 13	Dallas Mavericks	
Julyan Stone	July 14	Chicago Bulls	
Paul Zipser	July 14	Chicago Bulls	
Kadeem Allen^{†}	July 15	Boston Celtics	
Troy Williams	July 16	New York Knicks	
Alfonzo McKinnie	July 17	Toronto Raptors	
Kendrick Perkins	July 17	Cleveland Cavaliers	
Isaiah Whitehead	July 17	Denver Nuggets	
Georgios Papagiannis	July 18	Portland Trail Blazers	
Jaylen Morris	July 19	Atlanta Hawks	
Malik Newman^{†}	July 19	Los Angeles Lakers	
Myke Henry^{†}	July 20	Memphis Grizzlies	
Antonius Cleveland	July 21	Atlanta Hawks	
C. J. Williams	July 27	Los Angeles Clippers	
Carmelo Anthony	July 30	Atlanta Hawks	
Rodney Purvis	July 30	Boston Celtics	
Brandon Paul	July 31	San Antonio Spurs	
Brandon Jennings	August 1	Milwaukee Bucks	
Okaro White	August 5	Cleveland Cavaliers	
Chinanu Onuaku	August 6	Dallas Mavericks	
Terry Larrier	August 9	Dallas Mavericks	
David Stockton	August 14	Utah Jazz	
Mangok Mathiang^{†}	August 15	Charlotte Hornets	
R. J. Hunter^{†}	August 17	Houston Rockets	
Kobi Simmons^{†}	August 28	Memphis Grizzlies	
Dakari Johnson	August 31	Memphis Grizzlies	
DeAndre Liggins	August 31	New Orleans Pelicans	
Kyle Singler	August 31	Oklahoma City Thunder	
Luol Deng	September 1	Los Angeles Lakers	
Isaac Hamilton	September 14	Cleveland Cavaliers	
Scoochie Smith	September 14	Cleveland Cavaliers	
Jordan Barnett	September 17	Milwaukee Bucks	
Brandon McCoy	September 17	Milwaukee Bucks	
Travis Trice	September 18	Milwaukee Bucks	
Emeka Okafor	September 19	New Orleans Pelicans	
JaCorey Williams	September 19	Cleveland Cavaliers	
Amida Brimah	September 20	San Antonio Spurs	
Robert Johnson	September 20	Milwaukee Bucks	
Ike Nwamu	September 20	Milwaukee Bucks	
Julian Washburn	September 20	San Antonio Spurs	
James Young	September 20	Milwaukee Bucks	
Deyonta Davis	September 22	Sacramento Kings	
Olivier Hanlan	September 23	San Antonio Spurs	
Scottie Lindsey	September 24	Detroit Pistons	
Gabe York	September 27	Orlando Magic	
Travis Wear	October 19	Los Angeles Lakers	
C. J. Wilcox	October 19	Indiana Pacers	
Ömer Aşık	October 21	Chicago Bulls	
Andrew Harrison	November 1	Memphis Grizzlies	
Ben Moore	November 3	Indiana Pacers	
Tyson Chandler	November 4	Phoenix Suns	
John Holland^{†}	November 9	Cleveland Cavaliers	
Chasson Randle	November 12	Washington Wizards	
Jodie Meeks	November 25	Milwaukee Bucks	
Isaiah Canaan	November 28	Phoenix Suns	
Walt Lemon Jr.^{†}	November 29	Boston Celtics	
Andrew Harrison^{†}	December 2	Cleveland Cavaliers	
Billy Preston^{†}	December 2	Cleveland Cavaliers	
Danuel House	December 4	Houston Rockets	
Brandon Goodwin	December 10	Denver Nuggets	
Ron Baker	December 13	New York Knicks	
DeVaughn Akoon-Purcell^{†}	December 16	Denver Nuggets	
Zhou Qi	December 17	Houston Rockets	
Austin Rivers	December 18	Phoenix Suns	
Okaro White	December 20	Washington Wizards	
Tyler Ulis^{†}	December 26	Chicago Bulls	
Tyler Davis^{†}	December 27	Oklahoma City Thunder	
D. J. Stephens^{†}	December 30	Memphis Grizzlies	
Nick Young	December 30	Denver Nuggets	
Alan Williams^{†}	January 2	Brooklyn Nets	
Eric Moreland	January 3	Phoenix Suns	
Cameron Payne	January 3	Chicago Bulls	
Demetrius Jackson^{†}	January 6	Philadelphia 76ers	
Patrick McCaw	January 6	Cleveland Cavaliers	
James Nunnally	January 6	Minnesota Timberwolves	
Ron Baker	January 7	Washington Wizards	
MarShon Brooks	January 7	Chicago Bulls	
Lorenzo Brown	January 7	Toronto Raptors	
Michael Carter-Williams	January 7	Chicago Bulls	
Andrew Harrison^{†}	January 8	New Orleans Pelicans	
Jaylen Morris^{†}	January 13	Milwaukee Bucks	
Keenan Evans^{†}	January 15	Detroit Pistons	
Jalen Jones^{†}	January 15	Cleveland Cavaliers	
Zach Lofton^{†}	January 15	Detroit Pistons	
Jarnell Stokes^{†}	January 15	Memphis Grizzlies	
Kenneth Faried	January 19	Brooklyn Nets	
James Nunnally	January 21	Houston Rockets	
Ray Spalding	January 31	Dallas Mavericks	
Carmelo Anthony	February 1	Chicago Bulls	
Kobi Simmons	February 4	Cleveland Cavaliers	
Ike Anigbogu	February 7	Indiana Pacers	
Omri Casspi	February 7	Memphis Grizzlies	
Mitch Creek	February 7	Brooklyn Nets	
Wayne Ellington	February 7	Phoenix Suns	
Marcin Gortat	February 7	Los Angeles Clippers	
Daniel Hamilton	February 7	Atlanta Hawks	
Enes Kanter	February 7	New York Knicks	
Wesley Matthews	February 7	New York Knicks	
Ben McLemore	February 7	Sacramento Kings	
Salah Mejri	February 7	Dallas Mavericks	
Greg Monroe	February 7	Brooklyn Nets	
Markieff Morris	February 7	New Orleans Pelicans	
Malachi Richardson	February 7	Philadelphia 76ers	
Miloš Teodosić	February 7	Los Angeles Clippers	
Wade Baldwin IV	February 8	Indiana Pacers	
Jabari Bird	February 8	Atlanta Hawks	
Shelvin Mack	February 8	Atlanta Hawks	
Zach Randolph	February 8	Dallas Mavericks	
Nik Stauskas	February 8	Indiana Pacers	
Álex Abrines	February 9	Oklahoma City Thunder	
Michael Beasley	February 9	Los Angeles Clippers	
Henry Ellenson	February 9	Detroit Pistons	
Jeremy Lin	February 11	Atlanta Hawks	
Tim Frazier	February 28	New Orleans Pelicans	
Pau Gasol	March 1	San Antonio Spurs	
Isaiah Canaan	March 3	Milwaukee Bucks	
Christian Wood	March 18	Milwaukee Bucks	
Jason Smith	March 20	New Orleans Pelicans	
Jawun Evans^{†}	March 23	Phoenix Suns	
Trevon Duval^{†}	March 24	Milwaukee Bucks	
Justin Patton	April 3	Philadelphia 76ers	
Isaiah Briscoe	April 4	Orlando Magic	
Dusty Hannahs	April 5	Memphis Grizzlies	
Wesley Johnson	April 5	Washington Wizards	
Luc Mbah a Moute	April 7	Los Angeles Clippers	
Rodney McGruder	April 7	Miami Heat	
Deyonta Davis	June 10	Atlanta Hawks	

- † Two-way contract

==== Training camp cuts ====
All players listed did not make the final roster.

Atlanta Hawks	Boston Celtics	Brooklyn Nets	Charlotte Hornets	Chicago Bulls
Cole Aldrich; C. J. Anderson; Isaac Humphries; R. J. Hunter; Thomas Robinson	Justin Bibbs; Marcus Georges-Hunt; Nick King; Jeff Roberson	Mitch Creek; Drew Gordon; Tahjere McCall; Jordan McLaughlin; Nuni Omot; Shannon Scott	Jaylen Barford; Zach Smith; Isaiah Wilkins	Antonius Cleveland; Kaiser Gates; JaKarr Sampson; Derrick Walton Jr.
Cleveland Cavaliers	Dallas Mavericks	Denver Nuggets	Detroit Pistons	Golden State Warriors
Bonzie Colson; Levi Randolph; Kobi Simmons; Isaiah Taylor; Emanuel Terry	Ding Yanyuhang; Donte Ingram; Jalen Jones; Codi Miller-McIntyre; Rashad Vaughn	Xavier Silas; Donald Sloan; Emanuel Terry	Johnny Hamilton; Reggie Hearn; Chris McCullough	Will Cherry; Deyonta Davis; Danuel House; Kendrick Nunn; Tyler Ulis
Houston Rockets	Indiana Pacers	Los Angeles Clippers	Los Angeles Lakers	Memphis Grizzlies
Tim Bond; Bruno Caboclo; Alessandro Gentile; Rob Gray; Ángel Rodríguez; Brandon Sampson	Demetrius Denzel-Dyson; Omari Johnson; Elijah Stewart	Alexis Ajinça; Jamel Artis; Jawun Evans; Desi Rodriguez	Joel Berry II; Jeffrey Carroll; Scott Machado; Johnathan Williams	Markel Crawford; Brandon Goodwin; Ismaila Kane; Doral Moore
Miami Heat	Milwaukee Bucks	Minnesota Timberwolves	New Orleans Pelicans	New York Knicks
Charles Cooke; Marcus Lee; DeAndre Liggins; Malik Newman; Rodney Purvis; Raphiael Putney; Jarnell Stokes; Brianté Weber	Tim Frazier; Shabazz Muhammad; Tyler Zeller	Canyon Barry; Darius Johnson-Odom; William Lee; Jonathan Stark	Garlon Green; Jarrett Jack; Brandon McCoy; Darius Morris; Troy Williams	Kadeem Allen; Phillip Carr; Jeff Coby; Billy Garrett Jr.; John Jenkins; Joakim Noah; Tyrius Walker; Paul Watson
Oklahoma City Thunder	Orlando Magic	Philadelphia 76ers	Phoenix Suns	Portland Trail Blazers
Bryce Alford; Abdul Gaddy; Donte Grantham; Scotty Hopson; K. J. McDaniels; Richard Solomon; Dez Wells	Braian Angola; Devin Davis; B. J. Johnson; John Petrucelli	Anthony Brown; Matt Farrell; D. J. Hogg; Cory Jefferson; Darin Johnson; Emeka Okafor; Norvel Pelle	Darrell Arthur; Shaquille Harrison; Davon Reed	Cameron Oliver; Chinanu Onuaku; Gary Payton II
Sacramento Kings	San Antonio Spurs	Toronto Raptors	Utah Jazz	Washington Wizards
Jamel Artis; Brandon Austin; Kalin Lucas; Cameron Reynolds; Taren Sullivan; Gabe Vincent	Jaron Blossomgame; Manu Ginobili; Josh Huestis; Nick Johnson; Okaro White	Deng Adel; Kyle Collinsworth; Kay Felder; Malcolm Miller; Eric Moreland	Stephaun Branch; Isaiah Cousins; Isaac Haas; Trey Lewis; Jairus Lyles	Lavoy Allen; Chris Chiozza; Tiwian Kendley; Oleksandr Kobets; Chasson Randle

== Draft ==
=== First round ===
Pick	Player	Date signed	Team	Ref
1	Deandre Ayton	July 2	Phoenix Suns	
2	Marvin Bagley III	July 1	Sacramento Kings	
3	Luka Dončić	July 9	Dallas Mavericks	
4	Jaren Jackson Jr.	July 1	Memphis Grizzlies	
5	Trae Young	July 1	Atlanta Hawks	
6	Mohamed Bamba	July 2	Orlando Magic	
7	Wendell Carter Jr.	July 3	Chicago Bulls	
8	Collin Sexton	July 4	Cleveland Cavaliers	
9	Kevin Knox II	July 4	New York Knicks	
10	Mikal Bridges	July 2	Phoenix Suns	
11	Shai Gilgeous-Alexander	July 3	Los Angeles Clippers	
12	Miles Bridges	July 2	Charlotte Hornets	
13	Jerome Robinson	July 4	Los Angeles Clippers	
14	Michael Porter Jr.	July 3	Denver Nuggets	
15	Troy Brown Jr.	July 4	Washington Wizards	
16	Zhaire Smith	July 2	Philadelphia 76ers	
17	Donte DiVincenzo	July 10	Milwaukee Bucks	
18	Lonnie Walker	July 11	San Antonio Spurs	
19	Kevin Huerter	July 1	Atlanta Hawks	
20	Josh Okogie	July 2	Minnesota Timberwolves	
21	Grayson Allen	July 2	Utah Jazz	
22	Chandler Hutchison	July 3	Chicago Bulls	
23	Aaron Holiday	July 1	Indiana Pacers	
24	Anfernee Simons	July 2	Portland Trail Blazers	
25	Moritz Wagner	July 1	Los Angeles Lakers	
26	Landry Shamet	July 4	Philadelphia 76ers	
27	Robert Williams	July 5	Boston Celtics	
28	Jacob Evans	July 1	Golden State Warriors	
29	Džanan Musa	July 12	Brooklyn Nets	
30	Omari Spellman	July 1	Atlanta Hawks	

=== Second round ===
Pick	Player	Date signed	Team	Ref
31	Élie Okobo	July 6	Phoenix Suns	
32	Jevon Carter	July 15	Memphis Grizzlies	
33	Jalen Brunson	July 16	Dallas Mavericks	
34	Devonte' Graham	July 6	Charlotte Hornets	
35	Melvin Frazier	July 6	Orlando Magic	
36	Mitchell Robinson	July 8	New York Knicks	
37	Gary Trent Jr.	July 6	Portland Trail Blazers	
38	Khyri Thomas	July 25	Detroit Pistons	
39	Isaac Bonga	July 6	Los Angeles Lakers	
40	Rodions Kurucs	July 16	Brooklyn Nets	
41	Jarred Vanderbilt	July 10	Denver Nuggets	
42	Bruce Brown	July 6	Detroit Pistons	
43	Justin Jackson	—	Orlando Magic	
44	Issuf Sanon	—	Washington Wizards	
45	Hamidou Diallo	July 27	Oklahoma City Thunder	
46	De'Anthony Melton	September 21	Houston Rockets (Later traded to Phoenix)	
47	Sviatoslav Mykhailiuk	July 10	Los Angeles Lakers	
48	Keita Bates-Diop	July 6	Minnesota Timberwolves	
49	Chimezie Metu	September 4	San Antonio Spurs	
50	Alize Johnson	July 16	Indiana Pacers	
51	Tony Carr	—	New Orleans Pelicans	
52	Vincent Edwards	July 3	Houston Rockets	
53	Devon Hall	—	Oklahoma City Thunder	
54	Shake Milton	July 26	Philadelphia 76ers	
55	Arnoldas Kulboka	—	Charlotte Hornets	
56	Ray Spalding	July 20	Dallas Mavericks	
57	Kevin Hervey	—	Oklahoma City Thunder	
58	Thomas Welsh	July 19	Denver Nuggets	
59	George King	July 2	Phoenix Suns	
60	Kostas Antetokounmpo	July 13	Dallas Mavericks	

=== Previous years' draftees ===
Draft	Pick	Player	Date signed	Team	Previous team	Ref
2017	36	Jonah Bolden	July 24	Philadelphia 76ers	Maccabi Tel Aviv (Israel)	
2017	43	Isaiah Hartenstein	July 25	Houston Rockets	Rio Grande Valley Vipers (G League)	
2017	59	Jaron Blossomgame	September 20	San Antonio Spurs	Austin Spurs (G League)	
2015	42	Olivier Hanlan	September 20	San Antonio Spurs	Austin Spurs (G League)	
2014	53	Alessandro Gentile	October 12	Houston Rockets	Virtus Pallacanestro Bologna (Italy)	

=== Renounced draft rights ===
Draft	Pick	Player	Date of rights' renouncement	Former team	Ref
