= Dikembe (disambiguation) =

Dikembe Mutombo (1966–2024) was a Congolese-American basketball player.

Dikembe may also refer to:

- Dikembe (band), American rock band from Gainesville, Florida
- Dikembe Dixson (born 1996), American basketball player
