= Justin Bibbs =

American basketball player (born 1996)

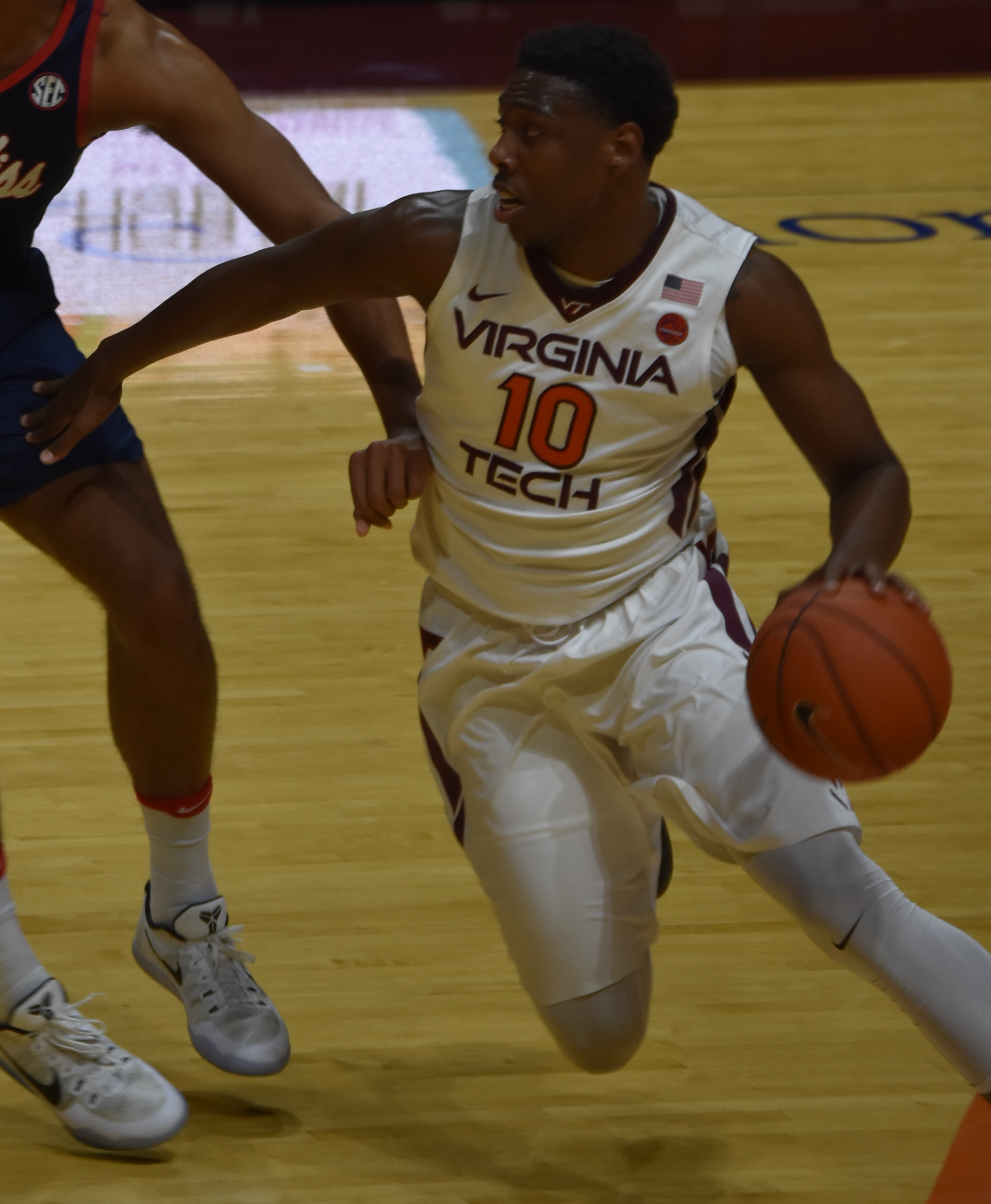
- Bibbs with the Virginia Tech Hokies in 2016

Free agent
- Position: Shooting guard

Personal information
- Born: January 14, 1996 (age 30) Dayton, Ohio, U.S.
- Listed height: 6 ft 5 in (1.96 m)
- Listed weight: 220 lb (100 kg)

Career information
- High school: Chaminade Julienne (Dayton, Ohio); Montverde Academy (Montverde, Florida)
- College: Virginia Tech (2014–2018)
- NBA draft: 2018: undrafted
- Playing career: 2018–present

Career history
- 2018–2019: Maine Red Claws
- 2019: Agua Caliente Clippers
- 2019–2020: Maine Red Claws
- 2021: Auckland Huskies
- 2021–2023: Śląsk Wrocław
- 2023–2024: Apollon Patras
- 2024: Panteras de Aguascalientes
- 2025: Halcones de Xalapa
- 2025–2026: Zalakerámia

Career highlights
- PLK champion (2022)
- Stats at Basketball Reference
Medals
Men's basketball
Representing the United States
FIBA U19 World Championship
Gold medal – first place	2015 Greece	Team

Justin Michael Bibbs (born January 14, 1996) is an American professional basketball player who last played for Zalakerámia of the Nemzeti Bajnokság I/A. He played college basketball for the Virginia Tech Hokies.

== Early life ==
Bibbs is the nephew of Pro Football Hall of Fame inductee Mike Haynes. Bibbs helped lead Montverde Academy to two national titles and a 28–0 record in his senior year. He was ranked one of the top shooting guards by several recruiting services.

== College career ==
Bibbs averaged 11.4 points and 3 rebounds per game as a freshman on an 11–22 team. As a sophomore, Bibbs posted 11.7 points per game on a team that finished 20–15 and reached the NIT. In Bibbs's junior season at Virginia Tech, he led the team to a 22–11 record and a berth in the NCAA Tournament for the first time since 2007. He averaged 9.2 points per game, shooting 43 percent from behind the arc. He had a season-high 18 points in three games. As a senior, Bibbs averaged 13.3 points, 2.5 rebounds, and 1.5 assists per game, shooting 40% on three-pointers. He was also one of the best defenders on the team and was often tasked with guarding the opposing team's best player. After the season Bibbs participated in the Portsmouth Invitational Tournament.

== Professional career ==
=== Maine Red Claws ===
After going undrafted in the 2018 NBA draft, Bibbs signed with the Boston Celtics for NBA Summer League. He averaged 5.0 points, 1.7 rebounds and 1.0 assist per game in six games. In September 2018 he joined the Celtics for training camp. Bibbs was waived by the Celtics on October 1, 2018. He was signed by the Celtics' G League affiliate, the Maine Red Claws. On January 30, 2019, Bibbs scored 30 points including 16 points in the fourth quarter in a 94–86 win against the Canton Charge.

=== Agua Caliente Clippers ===
On March 13, 2019, the Los Angeles Clippers announced that they had signed Bibbs to a 10-day contract. He was later assigned to their G League affiliate the Agua Caliente Clippers.

=== Maine Red Claws (II) ===
On November 7, 2019, it was announced that Bibbs would be returning to the Maine Red Claws as a member of their opening day roster. He scored the game-winning bucket against the College Park Skyhawks on January 19, 2020, and finished with 15 points, six rebounds, six assists and four steals.

=== Auckland Huskies ===
On May 18, 2021, Bibbs signed with the Auckland Huskies for the rest of the 2021 New Zealand NBL season. He missed the Huskies' semi-final with a right hand injury.

=== Śląsk Wrocław ===
Bibbs joined Śląsk Wrocław of the PLK for the 2021–22 season.

=== Apollon Patras ===
On December 21, 2023, Bibbs moved to Apollon Patras of the Greek Basket League. In 6 games, he averaged 12 points and 3.3 assists in 24 minutes of play.

== International career ==
On June 19, 2015, Bibbs was announced as a member of the 12-man 2015 USA Basketball Men's U19 World Championship Team for the 2015 FIBA Under-19 World Championship, replacing Isaiah Briscoe who suffered a concussion. The team won the gold medal against Croatia.

== Career statistics ==
Legend
GP	Games played	GS	Games started	MPG	Minutes per game
FG%	Field goal percentage	3P%	3-point field goal percentage	FT%	Free throw percentage
RPG	Rebounds per game	APG	Assists per game	SPG	Steals per game
BPG	Blocks per game	PPG	Points per game	**Bold**	Career high

=== NBA G League ===
==== Regular season ====
Year	Team	GP	GS	MPG	FG%	3P%	FT%	RPG	APG	SPG	BPG	PPG
2018–19	Agua Caliente	5	0	25.4	**.485**	.286	.500	**4.0**	1.6	.4	.0	8.2
2018–19	Maine	**44**	**30**	**30.0**	.416	.320	**.785**	3.0	**2.6**	**.8**	.1	**11.8**
2019–20	Maine	25	21	28.1	.443	**.363**	.600	3.3	2.5	**.8**	**.2**	9.6
Career		74	51	29.1	.427	.330	.740	3.2	2.5	.8	.1	10.8
