= Tiwian Kendley =

American basketball player (born 1995)

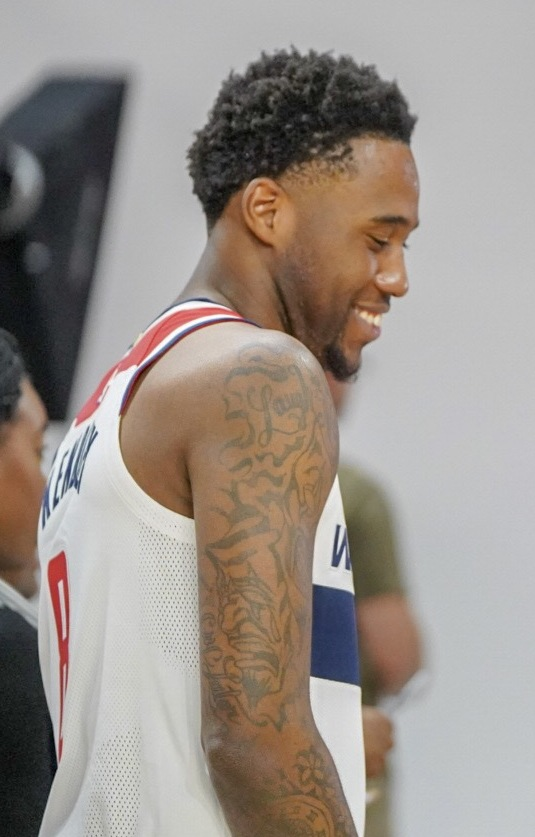
- Kendley at Washington Wizards media day, 2018

Personal information
- Born: March 26, 1995 (age 31) Harlem, New York, U.S.
- Listed height: 6 ft 5 in (1.96 m)
- Listed weight: 190 lb (86 kg)

Career information
- High school: Eleanor Roosevelt (Greenbelt, Maryland)
- College: Lamar CC (2014–2016); Morgan State (2016–2018)
- NBA draft: 2018: undrafted
- Playing career: 2018–2023
- Position: Shooting guard / small forward

Career history
- 2018–2019: Capital City Go-Go
- 2019: Windy City Bulls
- 2020: Gigantes de Jalisco
- 2021: Vëllaznimi
- 2021–2022: South Bay Lakers
- 2022: Wisconsin Herd
- 2023: Freseros de Irapuato

Career highlights
- First-team All-MEAC (2017)
- Stats at Basketball Reference

Tiwian Kendley (born March 26, 1995) is an American former professional basketball player. He played college basketball for Morgan State.

== Early life ==
Kendley grew up in the Abraham Lincoln projects in Harlem. At the age of 15, he moved to Greenbelt, Maryland, where he played basketball at Eleanor Roosevelt High School.

== College career ==
Kendley played two seasons at Lamar Community College in Lamar, Colorado, scoring over 1,000 points in two seasons before transferring to Morgan State University. He was recruited by assistant coach Glenroy Palmer, his former coach on the Amateur Athletic Union (AAU) circuit. As a junior, Kendley was named to the First Team All-Mid-Eastern Athletic Conference (MEAC) despite missing seven games due to injury. He averaged 21 points per game. Kendley was suspended the first 10 games of his senior season due to violating team rules. In his first game back on December 22, 2017, Kendley scored 31 points against George Mason. He scored a career-high 41 points to go with six rebounds, five assists and two steals against Bethune–Cookman on February 19, 2018. Kendley was twice named MEAC Player of the Week and was named to the All-Tournament Team as a senior. He averaged 26.1 points, 4.0 rebounds and 2.1 steals per game. In 44 games, he finished with 1,032 career points, becoming the fastest player in school history to score 1,000 points.

== Professional career ==
After going undrafted in the 2018 NBA draft, Kendley signed with the Washington Wizards for the NBA Summer League. He averaged 9.0 points, 2.5 rebounds, 2.0 steals and 2.0 assists per game. In September 2018 he signed an Exhibit 10 deal with the Wizards. Kendley was waived by the Wizards on October 14. He was then added to the training camp roster of the Wizards’ NBA G League affiliate, the Capital City Go-Go.

On February 21, 2019, Kendley was traded along with 2019 fourth-round pick to the Windy City Bulls for Dikembe Dixson and a 2019 third-round pick.

In March 2020, Kendley joined the Gigantes de Jalisco of the Mexican Circuito de Baloncesto de la Costa del Pacífico (CIBACOPA). In two games, he averaged 21.5 points, 4.5 rebounds, 1.5 assists and 1.5 steals per game.

On February 22, 2021, Kendley signed with KB Vëllaznimi of the Kosovo Basketball Superleague.

On October 23, 2021, Kendley signed with the South Bay Lakers as a free agent. However, he only played four games for the team, recording averages of 0.8 points, 0.5 rebounds and 0.3 assists per game. Kendley was waived on January 31, 2022.

Kendley then signed with the Wisconsin Herd, making his debut for the team on February 3, 2022, against the Lakeland Magic. On February 26, he scored 30 points in a defeat to the Westchester Knicks.

In 2023, Kendley signed with the Freseros de Irapuato, an expansion team in the Liga Nacional de Baloncesto Profesional (LNBP).

== Personal life ==
Kendly graduated from Morgan State in 2018 with a bachelor's degree in communications.
