= Dikembe Dixson =

American basketball player (born 1996)

No. 96 – Hoops Club
- Position: Small forward
- League: Lebanese Basketball League

Personal information
- Born: September 6, 1996 (age 29) Freeport, Illinois, U.S.
- Listed height: 6 ft 7 in (2.01 m)
- Listed weight: 200 lb (91 kg)

Career information
- High school: Ashland Blazer (Ashland, Kentucky); Thomas Nelson (Bardstown, Kentucky); Mingo Central (Delbarton, West Virginia)
- College: UIC (2015–2018)
- NBA draft: 2018: undrafted
- Playing career: 2018–present

Career history
- 2018–2019: Hoops Club
- 2019: Windy City Bulls
- 2019: Capital City Go-Go
- 2019–2020: Basquete UniFacisa
- 2021: Vardar
- 2021: T71 Dudelange
- 2021–2022: BBC Monthey-Chablais
- 2022–2023: New Basket Brindisi
- 2023: Kauhajoki Karhu Basket
- 2023–2024: Al Safa of Safwa
- 2024: Al-Karkh
- 2025–present: Hoops Club

Career highlights
- Second-team All-Horizon League (2016); Horizon League Freshman of the Year (2016)
- Stats at Basketball Reference

Dikembe Dixson (born September 6, 1996) is an American basketball player for Hoops Club of the Lebanese Basketball League. He played college basketball for the UIC Flames.

== High school career ==
Dixson grew up in Freeport, Illinois and was named after Dikembe Mutombo. He attended Paul G. Blazer High School, averaging 19.3 points and 8.1 rebounds per game as a sophomore. He transferred to Thomas Nelson High School but switched to Mingo Central Comprehensive High School in December 2013. As a junior at Mingo Central, he averaged 14.9 points per game and received Division I interest. He played alongside his cousin Montrell Dixson at Mingo Central. He led the team to first berth in the West Virginia Class AA state tournament. Dikembe Dixson was UIC coach Steve McClain's first recruit, picking the Flames after meeting with McClain and hearing how he developed NBA prospects like Victor Oladipo and Cody Zeller as an assistant at Indiana.

College recruiting information
Name	Hometown	School	Height	Weight	Commit date
Dikembe Dixson; PF	Freeport, IL	Mingo Central Comprehensive High School (WV)	6 ft 7 in (2.01 m)	190 lb (86 kg)	Jun 10, 2015
Dikembe Dixson; PF	Recruit ratings: Scout: Rivals: 247Sports: ESPN: (78)				
Overall recruit ranking: Scout: #48 Rivals: #48 247Sports: #48 ESPN: #44
Note: In many cases, Scout, Rivals, 247Sports, On3, and ESPN may conflict in their listings of height and weight.; In these cases, the average was taken. ESPN grades are on a 100-point scale.; Sources: "UIC 2015 Basketball Commitments". Rivals.; "2017 UIC Basketball Commits". Scout.; "Scout.com Team Recruiting Rankings". Scout.; "2015 Team Ranking". Rivals.; "2015 UIC 24/7 Sports Commits". 247Sports.

== College career ==
As a freshman, Dixson averaged 19.8 points and 7.3 rebounds per game. He was named the Horizon League’s Freshman of the Year in 2016. As a sophomore, Dixson averaged 20.3 points and six rebounds per game while shooting 47.7 percent from the field. He tore his ACL ten games into the season and was forced to miss the remainder of it. Dixson started all 32 games as a junior, averaging 14.2 points, 3.5 rebounds and 1.3 steals per game and shooting 38.9 percent from the field. After the season he declared for the 2018 NBA draft, finishing his career at UIC with 1,250 points.

== Professional career ==
=== Hoops Club (2018) ===
After going undrafted in the 2018 NBA draft, Dixson signed a summer league deal with the Miami Heat. On September 9, 2018, Dixson had signed his first professional contract with Hoops Club in Lebanon. Playing only five games with the team, Dixson had averaged 22.2 points, 4.8 rebounds and 3 steals while shooting 46.7 percent from the field.

=== Windy City Bulls (2019) ===
As of 2019, Dixson had signed a contract with the Windy City Bulls, the G League affiliate team for the Chicago Bulls.

=== Capital City Go-Go (2019) ===
On February 21, 2019, Dixson was traded to the Capital City Go-Go along with a 2019 third-round pick for Tiwian Kendley and 2019 fourth-round pick. He signed an Exhibit 10 deal with the Washington Wizards but was waived on October 17.

=== Basquete UniFacisa (2019–2020) ===
In December 2019, Dixson signed with Basquete UniFacisa of the Novo Basquete Brasil.

=== Vardar (2021) ===
In January 2021, Dixson signed with Vardar of the Macedonian First League. He averaged 19.7 points, 7.3 rebounds, 1.5 assists, and 1.6 steals per game.

=== T71 Dudelange (2021) ===
On July 31, 2021, Dixson signed with T71 Dudelange of the Total League. In eight games, he averaged 25.8 points, 7.4 rebounds, 1.9 assists and 1.5 steals per game.

=== BBC Monthey-Chablais (2021–2022) ===
On November 8, 2021, Dixson signed with BBC Monthey-Chablais of the Swiss Basketball League.

=== New Basket Brindisi (2022–2023) ===
On August 7, 2022, he has signed with New Basket Brindisi of the Lega Basket Serie A.

=== Karhu Basket (2023) ===
On February 27, 2023, he signed with Karhu Basket of the Korisliiga.

=== Al-Karkh (2024) ===
On August 26, 2024, he signed with Al-Karkh of the Iraqi Premier Basketball League.

=== Hoops Club (2025–present) ===
On January 19, 2025, Dixson signed with Hoops Club of the Lebanese Basketball League.
