= 2016 Lega Basket Serie A Playoffs =

The 2016 Serie A Playoffs were the final phase of the 2015–16 Serie A season. They started on 7 May and finished on 15 June 2016, with the 2016 Lega Basket Serie A Finals.

Banco di Sardegna Sassari was the defending champions.

EA7 Emporio Armani Milano won their 27th title by beating Grissin Bon Reggio Emilia in game 6 of the finals.

== Qualified teams ==
The eight first qualified teams after the end of the 2015–16 Serie A regular season qualified to the playoffs.

Pos	Team	Pld	W	L	PF	PA	PR	Pts	Qualification
1	EA7 Emporio Armani Milano	30	22	8	2452	2205	1.112	44	Seeded teams
2	Grissin Bon Reggio Emilia	30	21	9	2424	2263	1.071	42	Seeded teams
3	Sidigas Avellino	30	20	10	2389	2307	1.036	40	Seeded teams
4	Vanoli Cremona	30	19	11	2258	2213	1.020	38	Seeded teams
5	Umana Reyer Venezia	30	16	14	2320	2230	1.040	32	Non-seeded teams
6	Giorgio Tesi Group Pistoia	30	16	14	2311	2320	0.996	32	Non-seeded teams
7	Banco di Sardegna Sassari	30	16	14	2509	2439	1.029	32	Non-seeded teams
8	Dolomiti Energia Trento	30	15	15	2292	2274	1.008	30	Non-seeded teams

Source: Legabasket

== Bracket ==
As of 13 June 2016.

Quarterfinals
1	EA7 Emporio Armani Milano	3
8	Dolomiti Energia Trento	0
4	Vanoli Cremona	1
5	Umana Reyer Venezia	3
3	Sidigas Avellino	3
6	Giorgio Tesi Group Pistoia	0
2	Grissin Bon Reggio Emilia	3
7	Banco di Sardegna Sassari	0

Semifinals
1	EA7 Emporio Armani Milano	4
5	Umana Reyer Venezia	2
3	Sidigas Avellino	3
2	Grissin Bon Reggio Emilia	4

Finals
1	EA7 Emporio Armani Milano	4
2	Grissin Bon Reggio Emilia	2

== Quarterfinals ==
The semifinals will be played in a best of five format from 8 May to 16 May 2016.

=== Sidigas Avellino v Giorgio Tesi Group Pistoia ===
7 May 2016	Sidigas Avellino	93–76	Giorgio Tesi Group Pistoia	Avellino
18:15 (CEST)	Scoring by quarter: 28–15, 27–26, 22–15, 16–20
Sky Sport	Pts: Buva 23; Rebs: Buva 8 Asts: Ragland 7 PIR: Buva 29	Boxscore	Pts: Kirk 19; Rebs: Kirk 6 Asts: Moore 4 PIR: Kirk 13	Arena: PalaDelMauro; Referees: Paolo Taurino, Massimiliano Filippini, Alessandro Vicino

9 May 2016	Sidigas Avellino	83–70	Giorgio Tesi Group Pistoia	Avellino
20:30 (CEST)	Scoring by quarter: 23–17, 24–16, 19–18, 17–19
	Pts: Nunnally 32; Rebs: Buva 12; Asts: Ragland 9 PIR: Nunnally 32	Boxscore	Pts: Czyż 14; Rebs: Kirk 7 Asts: Moore 9 PIR: Czyż 18	Arena: PalaDelMauro; Referees: Luigi Lamonica, Maurizio Biggi, Beniamino Manuel Attard

11 May 2016	Giorgio Tesi Group Pistoia	90–92(OT)	Sidigas Avellino	Pistoia
20:45 (CEST)	Scoring by quarter: 27–21, 18–22, 16–20, 21–19, Overtime: 8–10
Sky Sport	Pts: Knowles, Kirk 23; Rebs: Czyż 10; Asts: Moore 9 PIR: Knowles 23	Boxscore	Pts: Nunnally 17; Rebs: Leunen 9 Asts: Nunnally 5 PIR: Leunen 28	Arena: PalaCarrara; Referees: Roberto Begnis, Manuel Mazzoni, Mark Bartoli

=== Grissin Bon Reggio Emilia v Banco di Sardegna Sassari ===
7 May 2016	Grissin Bon Reggio Emilia	85–68	Banco di Sardegna Sassari	Reggio Emilia
20:45 (CEST)	Scoring by quarter: 28–18, 23–22, 16–19, 18–9
Rai Sport 1	Pts: Aradori 24; Rebs: Polonara 7 Asts: Kaukenas 5 PIR: Aradori 25	Boxscore	Pts: Alexander 15; Rebs: Alexander 5 Asts: Logan 5 PIR: Stipcevic 18	Arena: PalaBigi; Referees: Luigi Lamonica, Roberto Begnis, Manuel Mazzoni

9 May 2016	Grissin Bon Reggio Emilia	82–75	Banco di Sardegna Sassari	Reggio Emilia
20:45 (CEST)	Scoring by quarter: 20–22, 17–22, 20–18, 25–13
Sky Sport	Pts: Della Valle 19; Rebs: Polonara 8 Asts: Needham, Della Valle 3 PIR: Polonara 22	Boxscore	Pts: Varnado 25; Rebs: Varnado 7 Asts: Stipcevic 7 PIR: Varnado 31	Arena: PalaBigi; Referees: Carmelo Paternicò, Enrico Sabetta, Gianluca Sardella

11 May 2016	Banco di Sardegna Sassari	85–99	Grissin Bon Reggio Emilia	Sassari
20:45 (CEST)	Scoring by quarter: 19–29, 17–27, 23–20, 26–23
Rai Sport 1	Pts: Logan 16; Rebs: Varnado 6 Asts: Logan 8 PIR: Logan 23	Boxscore	Pts: Aradori, De Nicolao 19; Rebs: Polonara 10; Asts: Polonara 9 PIR: Aradori 26	Arena: PalaSerradimigni; Referees: Gianluca Mattioli, Dino Seghetti, Maurizio Biggi

=== EA7 Emporio Armani Milano v Dolomiti Energia Trento ===
8 May 2016	EA7 Emporio Armani Milano	86–74	Dolomiti Energia Trento	Desio
19:30 (CEST)	Scoring by quarter: 17–20, 25–14, 23–25, 21–15
Sky Sport	Pts: Sanders 21; Rebs: Batista 11; Asts: Gentile, Simon 4 PIR: Sanders 25	Boxscore	Pts: Pascolo 18; Rebs: Pascolo 14; Asts: Trent Lockett 6 PIR: Pascolo 34	Arena: PalaDesio; Referees: Dino Seghetti, Gabriele Bettini, Guido Federico Di Francesco

10 May 2016	EA7 Emporio Armani Milano	79–71	Dolomiti Energia Trento	Desio
20:45 (CEST)	Scoring by quarter: 13–21, 25–16, 24–15, 17–19
Rai Sport 1	Pts: Gentile 17; Rebs: Batista 7 Asts: Kalnietis 4 PIR: Batista 15	Boxscore	Pts: Pascolo 22; Rebs: Wright 12; Asts: Forray 6 PIR: Pascolo 23	Arena: PalaDesio; Referees: Saverio Lanzarini, Alessandro Martolini, Michele Rossi

12 May 2016	Dolomiti Energia Trento	61–62	EA7 Emporio Armani Milano	Trento
20:45 (CEST)	Scoring by quarter: 24–19, 13–13, 9–14, 15–16
Sky Sport	Pts: Wright 14; Rebs: Wright 6 Asts: Sutton 4 PIR: Wright 17	Boxscore	Pts: Simon 19; Rebs: McLean, Macvan 7 Asts: Kalnietis 4 PIR: Simon 18	Arena: PalaTrento; Referees: Paolo Taurino, Massimiliano Filippini, Evangelista Caiazza

=== Vanoli Cremona v Umana Reyer Venezia ===
8 May 2016	Vanoli Cremona	73–79	Umana Reyer Venezia	Cremona
20:30 (CEST)	Scoring by quarter: 22–19, 18–16, 18–24, 15–20
	Pts: Turner 24; Rebs: Starks, Washington 5 Asts: Cusin; PIR: Turner 21	Boxscore	Pts: Green 21; Rebs: Ress 5 Asts: Pargo, Green 5 PIR: Green 24	Arena: PalaRadi; Referees: Gianluca Mattioli, Carmelo Lo Guzzo, Mark Bartoli

10 May 2016	Vanoli Cremona	77–67	Umana Reyer Venezia	Cremona
20:45 (CEST)	Scoring by quarter: 17–24, 12–11, 25–15, 23–17
Sky Sport	Pts: McGee 21; Rebs: Dragovic 12; Asts: Turner 2 PIR: Dragovic 24	Boxscore	Pts: Pargo 13; Rebs: Pargo 7 Asts: Pargo 2 PIR: Pargo 13	Arena: PalaRadi; Referees: Tolga Sahin, Emanuele Aronne, Luca Weidmann

12 May 2016	Umana Reyer Venezia	77–61	Vanoli Cremona	Mestre
20:30 (CEST)	Scoring by quarter: 17–14, 22–13, 13–14, 25–20
	Pts: Pargo 24; Rebs: Ortner 8 Asts: Green 5 PIR: Pargo 28	Boxscore	Pts: Cusin, Turner 10; Rebs: Dragović 8 Asts: four players 3 PIR: Cusin 21	Arena: Palasport Giuseppe Taliercio; Referees: Enrico Sabetta, Alessandro Vicino, Lorenzo Baldini

14 May 2016	Umana Reyer Venezia	87–76	Vanoli Cremona	Mestre
20:30 (CEST)	Scoring by quarter: 19–20, 27–17, 13–21, 28–18
Rai Sport 1	Pts: Pargo 18; Rebs: Ejim 8 Asts: Pargo, Green 3 PIR: Green 18	Boxscore	Pts: Washington 20; Rebs: Turner 6 Asts: Starks 4 PIR: Washington 22	Arena: Palasport Giuseppe Taliercio; Referees: Manuel Mazzoni, Gabriele Bettini, Michele Rossi

== Semifinals ==
The semifinals will be played in a best of seven format from 19 May to 31 May 2016.

=== Grissin Bon Reggio Emilia v Sidigas Avellino ===
18 May 2016	Grissin Bon Reggio Emilia	83–69	Sidigas Avellino	Reggio Emilia
20:45 (CEST)	Scoring by quarter: 18–23, 23–13, 22–13, 20–20
Rai Sport 1 Sky Sport	Pts: Polonara 18; Rebs: Polonara 12; Asts: three players 4 PIR: Polonara 21	Boxscore	Pts: Ragland 16; Rebs: Ragland 7 Asts: Ragland 4 PIR: Ragland 23	Arena: PalaBigi; Referees: Carmelo Paternicò, Roberto Begnis, Luca Weidmann

20 May 2016	Grissin Bon Reggio Emilia	86–78	Sidigas Avellino	Reggio Emilia
20:45 (CEST)	Scoring by quarter: 21–22, 20–18, 25–18, 20–20
Rai Sport 1 Sky Sport	Pts: Kaukenas, Gentile 13; Rebs: Polonara, Della Valle 6 Asts: Aradori, Gentile 3 PIR: Gentile 19	Boxscore	Pts: Buva 20; Rebs: Nunnally 7 Asts: Ragland 5 PIR: Buva 26	Arena: PalaBigi; Referees: Tolga Sahin, Enrico Sabetta, Carmelo Lo Guzzo

22 May 2016	Sidigas Avellino	89–75	Grissin Bon Reggio Emilia	Avellino
20:45 (CEST)	Scoring by quarter: 19–22, 22–15, 25–15, 23–23
Rai Sport 1 Sky Sport	Pts: Buva 21; Rebs: Leunen 12; Asts: Nunnally 8 PIR: Nunnally 29	Boxscore	Pts: Gentile 12; Rebs: Polonara 7 Asts: Needham 4 PIR: Lavrinovič, Gentile 12	Arena: PalaDelMauro; Referees: Saverio Lanzarini, Alessandro Martolini, Maurizio Biggi

24 May 2016	Sidigas Avellino	97–54	Grissin Bon Reggio Emilia	Avellino
20:45 (CEST)	Scoring by quarter: 30–10, 16–13, 29–14, 22–17
Rai Sport 1 Sky Sport	Pts: Buva 19; Rebs: Cervi 8 Asts: Green 6 PIR: Buva 24	Boxscore	Pts: Della Valle 10; Rebs: Golubović 7 Asts: Aradori, Della Valle 2 PIR: Della Valle 12	Arena: PalaDelMauro; Referees: Luigi Lamonica, Massimiliano Filippini, Emanuele Aronne

26 May 2016	Grissin Bon Reggio Emilia	82–72	Sidigas Avellino	Reggio Emilia
20:45 (CEST)	Scoring by quarter: 18–13, 21–25, 18–12, 25–22
Rai Sport 1 Sky Sport	Pts: Aradori 16; Rebs: Aradori, Polonara 9 Asts: Aradori 4 PIR: Aradori 28	Boxscore	Pts: Ragland 23; Rebs: Leunen 8 Asts: three players 2 PIR: Ragland 26	Arena: PalaBigi; Referees: Paolo Taurino, Manuel Mazzoni, Gianluca Sardella

28 May 2016	Sidigas Avellino	83–74	Grissin Bon Reggio Emilia	Avellino
20:45 (CEST)	Scoring by quarter: 21–17, 14–18, 25–19, 23–20
Rai Sport 1 Sky Sport	Pts: Ragland 23; Rebs: Cervi 8 Asts: Green 9 PIR: Ragland 22	Boxscore	Pts: Kaukėnas 22; Rebs: Polonara 8 Asts: Lavrinovič, Kaukėnas 3 PIR: Golubović 21	Arena: PalaDelMauro; Referees: Carmelo Paternicò, Dino Seghetti, Maurizio Biggi

30 May 2016	Grissin Bon Reggio Emilia	85–80	Sidigas Avellino	Reggio Emilia
20:45 (CEST)	Scoring by quarter: 24–17, 18–19, 19–19, 24–25
Rai Sport 1 Sky Sport	Pts: Kaukėnas 17; Rebs: Aradori, Lavrinovič 5 Asts: Della Valle, Kaukėnas 5 PIR: Kaukėnas 19	Boxscore	Pts: Nunnally 23; Rebs: Leunen 8 Asts: Green, Nunnally 5 PIR: Nunnally 21	Arena: PalaBigi; Referees: Luigi Lamonica, Enrico Sabetta, Roberto Begnis

=== EA7 Emporio Armani Milano v Umana Reyer Venezia ===
19 May 2016	EA7 Emporio Armani Milano	77–84	Umana Reyer Venezia	Desio
20:45 (CEST)	Scoring by quarter: 21–21, 22–17, 10–28, 24–18
Rai Sport 1 Sky Sport	Pts: Sanders 28; Rebs: Batista 8 Asts: Lafayette 4 PIR: Sanders 28	Boxscore	Pts: Green 16; Rebs: Ejim 6 Asts: Green 6 PIR: Green 21	Arena: PalaDesio; Referees: Luigi Lamonica, Manuel Mazzoni, Mark Bartoli

21 May 2016	EA7 Emporio Armani Milano	78–65	Umana Reyer Venezia	Desio
20:45 (CEST)	Scoring by quarter: 23–12, 24–13, 17–28, 14–12
Rai Sport 1 Sky Sport	Pts: Simon 17; Rebs: Batista 7 Asts: Gentile 6 PIR: Simon 17	Boxscore	Pts: Bramos 13; Rebs: Ortner 5 Asts: Pargo 6 PIR: Green 11	Arena: PalaDesio; Referees: Paolo Taurino, Massimiliano Filippini, Emanuele Aronne

23 May 2016	Umana Reyer Venezia	73–62	EA7 Emporio Armani Milano	Mestre
20:45 (CEST)	Scoring by quarter: 24–14, 24–17, 17–13, 8–18
Rai Sport 1 Sky Sport	Pts: Pargo 17; Rebs: Ejim 7 Asts: Green 5 PIR: Green 24	Boxscore	Pts: McLean 17; Rebs: McLean, Mačvan 7 Asts: Kalnietis 3 PIR: McLean 21	Arena: Palasport Giuseppe Taliercio; Referees: Gianluca Mattioli, Dino Seghetti, Gianluca Sardella

25 May 2016	Umana Reyer Venezia	80–88	EA7 Emporio Armani Milano	Mestre
20:45 (CEST)	Scoring by quarter: 17–21, 19–18, 22–22, 22–27
Rai Sport 1 Sky Sport	Pts: Bramos 14; Rebs: Ejim, Ortner 7 Asts: Green 7 PIR: Green 19	Boxscore	Pts: Simon 25; Rebs: Batista 12; Asts: Kalnietis 5 PIR: Simon 28	Arena: Palasport Giuseppe Taliercio; Referees: Carmelo Paternicò, Saverio Lanzarini, Alessandro Martolini

27 May 2016	EA7 Emporio Armani Milano	78–67	Umana Reyer Venezia	Milan
20:45 (CEST)	Scoring by quarter: 23–19, 23–21, 14–18, 18–9
Rai Sport 1 Sky Sport	Pts: Kalnietis 14; Rebs: Mačvan 11; Asts: Gentile, Simon 6 PIR: Mačvan 20	Boxscore	Pts: Tonut 13; Rebs: Ortner 7 Asts: Pargo 7 PIR: Pargo, Tonut 11	Arena: Mediolanum Forum; Referees: Tolga Sahin, Enrico Sabetta, Roberto Begnis

29 May 2016	Umana Reyer Venezia	60–68	EA7 Emporio Armani Milano	Mestre
20:45 (CEST)	Scoring by quarter: 13–16, 13–14, 12–18, 22–20
Rai Sport 1 Sky Sport	Pts: Tonut 12; Rebs: Tonut 7 Asts: Green 5 PIR: Tonut 22	Boxscore	Pts: Lafayette 16; Rebs: Batista 12; Asts: Simon 3 PIR: Simon 18	Arena: Palasport Giuseppe Taliercio; Referees: Severio Lanzarini, Manuel Mazzoni, Mark Bartoli

== Finals ==
The finals will be played in a best of seven format from 3 to 15 June 2016.

=== EA7 Emporio Armani Milano v Grissin Bon Reggio Emilia ===
3 June 2016	EA7 Emporio Armani Milano	87–80	Grissin Bon Reggio Emilia	Milan
20:45 (CEST)	Scoring by quarter: 20–21, 27–14, 19–18, 21–27
Rai Sport 1 Sky Sport	Pts: Gentile 15; Rebs: Simon 8 Asts: Simon 5 PIR: McLean 27	Boxscore	Pts: Kaukėnas 27; Rebs: Polonara 8 Asts: De Nicolao 6 PIR: Kaukėnas 30	Arena: Mediolanum Forum; Referees: Luigi Lamonica, Enrico Sabetta, Massimiliano Filippini

5 June 2016	EA7 Emporio Armani Milano	94–73	Grissin Bon Reggio Emilia	Milan
20:45 (CEST)	Scoring by quarter: 23-24, 28-21, 18-17, 25-11
Rai Sport 1 Sky Sport	Pts: Gentile 23; Rebs: Kalnietis 6 Asts: Lafayette 6 PIR: Gentile, Sanders 26	Boxscore	Pts: Della Valle 20; Rebs: De Nicolao 5 Asts: three players 3 PIR: De Nicolao 14	Arena: Mediolanum Forum; Referees: Paolo Taurino, Roberto Begnis, Gianluca Sardella

7 June 2016	Grissin Bon Reggio Emilia	81–72	EA7 Emporio Armani Milano	Reggio Emilia
20:45 (CEST)	Scoring by quarter: 22–18, 21–15, 15–18, 23–21
Rai Sport 1 Sky Sport	Pts: Lavrinovič 20; Rebs: Polonara 10; Asts: Needham 6 PIR: Della Valle 20	Boxscore	Pts: Simon 14; Rebs: Kalnietis 6 Asts: Gentile, Cinciarini 4 PIR: three players 15	Arena: PalaBigi; Referees: Tolga Sahin, Alessandro Martolini, Carmelo Lo Guzzo

9 June 2016	Grissin Bon Reggio Emilia	81–76	EA7 Emporio Armani Milano	Reggio Emilia
20:45 (CEST)	Scoring by quarter: 21–22, 20–17, 18–16, 22–21
Rai Sport 1 Sky Sport	Pts: Aradori, Lavrinovič 15; Rebs: Polonara 8 Asts: De Nicolao 4 PIR: Aradori 23	Boxscore	Pts: Sanders 21; Rebs: Batista 7 Asts: Cerella, Kalnietis 4 PIR: McLean 18	Arena: PalaBigi; Referees: Saverio Lanzarini, Gianluca Mattioli, Manuel Mazzoni

11 June 2016	EA7 Emporio Armani Milano	97–73	Grissin Bon Reggio Emilia	Milan
20:45 (CEST)	Scoring by quarter: 29–8, 23–23, 22–29, 23–13
Rai Sport 1 Sky Sport	Pts: Kalnietis 16; Rebs: Kalnietis, Simon 8 Asts: Simon 4 PIR: Kalnietis 26	Boxscore	Pts: Aradori 14; Rebs: Polonara 9 Asts: De Nicolao 4 PIR: Aradori, Polonara 17	Arena: Mediolanum Forum; Referees: Luigi Lamonica, Tolga Sahin, Emanuele Aronne

13 June 2016	Grissin Bon Reggio Emilia	70–74	EA7 Emporio Armani Milano	Reggio Emilia
20:45 (CEST)	Scoring by quarter: 19–21, 19–8, 12–16, 20–29
Rai Sport 1 Sky Sport	Pts: Kaukėnas 18; Rebs: Polonara 8 Asts: De Nicolao, Kaukėnas 4 PIR: Kaukėnas 20	Boxscore	Pts: Gentile 16; Rebs: Batista 9 Asts: Sanders 5 PIR: Batista 23	Arena: PalaBigi; Referees: Enrico Sabetta, Saverio Lanzarini, Alessandro Martolini
