= 2016 Lega Basket Serie A Finals =

Team	Coach	Wins
EA7 Emporio Armani Milano	Jasmin Repeša	4
Grissin Bon Reggio Emilia	Massimiliano Menetti	2
- Dates: June 3–15, 2015
- MVP: (United States) Rakim Sanders

The 2016 Lega Basket Serie A Finals was the championship series of the 2015–16 regular season, of the Lega Basket Serie A, the highest professional basketball league in Italy, and the conclusion of the season's playoffs. The 2015–16 regular season champion EA7 Emporio Armani Milano possessing home advantage (with the first two, the fifth and the seventh games at the Mediolanum Forum) and the second placed Grissin Bon Reggio Emilia contested for the title in a best-of-7 showdown, from June 3 to 15, 2016. These were the second Finals for Grissin Bon Reggio Emilia.

EA7 Emporio Armani Milano won their 27th title bt beating Grissin Bon Reggio Emilia in game 6 of the Finals.

Rakim Sanders of the EA7 Emporio Armani Milano was named MVP in the league's Finals series of the playoffs.

== Road to the finals ==
EA7 Emporio Armani Milano		Grissin Bon Reggio Emilia
Pos / Team / Pld / W / L / PF / PA / PD; 1 / EA7 Emporio Armani Milano / 30 / 22 / 8 / 2452 / 2205 / +247; 2 / Grissin Bon Reggio Emilia / 30 / 21 / 9 / 2424 / 2263 / +161; 3 / Sidigas Avellino / 30 / 20 / 10 / 2389 / 2307 / +82; 4 / Vanoli Cremona / 30 / 19 / 11 / 2258 / 2213 / +45; 5 / Umana Reyer Venezia / 30 / 16 / 14 / 2320 / 2230 / +90; 6 / Giorgio Tesi Group Pistoia / 30 / 16 / 14 / 2311 / 2320 / −9; 7 / Banco di Sardegna Sassari / 30 / 16 / 14 / 2509 / 2439 / +70; 8 / Dolomiti Energia Trento / 30 / 15 / 15 / 2292 / 2274 / +18; 9 / Openjobmetis Varese / 30 / 14 / 16 / 2252 / 2344 / −92; 10 / Enel Brindisi / 30 / 13 / 17 / 2320 / 2351 / −31; 11 / Acqua Vitasnella Cantù / 30 / 12 / 18 / 2422 / 2405 / +17; 12 / Consultinvest Pesaro / 30 / 12 / 18 / 2282 / 2355 / −73; 13 / Betaland Capo d'Orlando / 30 / 11 / 19 / 2058 / 2205 / −147; 14 / Pasta Reggia Caserta / 30 / 11 / 19 / 2171 / 2288 / −117; 15 / Manital Torino / 30 / 11 / 19 / 2261 / 2401 / −140; 16 / Obiettivo Lavoro Bologna / 30 / 11 / 19 / 2239 / 2360 / −121; Source: Legabasket Best league record	Regular season	Pos / Team / Pld / W / L / PF / PA / PD; 1 / EA7 Emporio Armani Milano / 30 / 22 / 8 / 2452 / 2205 / +247; 2 / Grissin Bon Reggio Emilia / 30 / 21 / 9 / 2424 / 2263 / +161; 3 / Sidigas Avellino / 30 / 20 / 10 / 2389 / 2307 / +82; 4 / Vanoli Cremona / 30 / 19 / 11 / 2258 / 2213 / +45; 5 / Umana Reyer Venezia / 30 / 16 / 14 / 2320 / 2230 / +90; 6 / Giorgio Tesi Group Pistoia / 30 / 16 / 14 / 2311 / 2320 / −9; 7 / Banco di Sardegna Sassari / 30 / 16 / 14 / 2509 / 2439 / +70; 8 / Dolomiti Energia Trento / 30 / 15 / 15 / 2292 / 2274 / +18; 9 / Openjobmetis Varese / 30 / 14 / 16 / 2252 / 2344 / −92; 10 / Enel Brindisi / 30 / 13 / 17 / 2320 / 2351 / −31; 11 / Acqua Vitasnella Cantù / 30 / 12 / 18 / 2422 / 2405 / +17; 12 / Consultinvest Pesaro / 30 / 12 / 18 / 2282 / 2355 / −73; 13 / Betaland Capo d'Orlando / 30 / 11 / 19 / 2058 / 2205 / −147; 14 / Pasta Reggia Caserta / 30 / 11 / 19 / 2171 / 2288 / −117; 15 / Manital Torino / 30 / 11 / 19 / 2261 / 2401 / −140; 16 / Obiettivo Lavoro Bologna / 30 / 11 / 19 / 2239 / 2360 / −121; Source: Legabasket 2nd best league record
Defeated the 8th seeded Dolomiti Energia Trento, 3-1	Quarterfinals	Defeated the 7th seeded Banco di Sardegna Sassari, 3-0
Defeated the 5th seeded Umana Reyer Venezia, 4-2	Semifinals	Defeated the 3rd seeded Sidigas Avellino, 4-3

=== Regular season series ===
3 June 2016	Grissin Bon Reggio Emilia	74–72	EA7 Emporio Armani Milano	Reggio Emilia
20:45 (CEST)	Scoring by quarter: 21–8, 12–17, 17–21, 24–26
Rai Sport 1	Pts: De Nicolao 17; Rebs: Veremeenko 7 Asts: Aradori, De Nicolao 4 PIR: De Nicolao 25	Boxscore	Pts: Gentile 18; Rebs: McLean 14; Asts: Cinciarini 4 PIR: Simon 16	Arena: PalaBigi; Referees: Luigi Lamonica, Gianluca Mattioli, Stefano Ursi

3 June 2016	EA7 Emporio Armani Milano	84–80	Grissin Bon Reggio Emilia	Milan
20:45 (CEST)	Scoring by quarter: 26–28, 17–15, 19–18, 22–19
Rai Sport 1	Pts: Simon 25; Rebs: Lafayette, Batista 6 Asts: Lafayette 5 PIR: Simon 27	Boxscore	Pts: Della Valle 28; Rebs: Polonara 7 Asts: Aradori 6 PIR: Della Valle 27	Arena: Mediolanum Forum; Referees: Carmelo Paternicò, Enrico Sabetta, Gianluca Sardella

== Series ==
=== Game 1 ===
3 June 2016	EA7 Emporio Armani Milano	87–80 (Series: EA7 Milano leads series, 1–0)	Grissin Bon Reggio Emilia	Milan
20:45 (CEST)	Scoring by quarter: 20–21, 27–14, 19–18, 21–27
Rai Sport 1 Sky Sport	Pts: Gentile 15; Rebs: Simon 8 Asts: Simon 5 PIR: McLean 27	Boxscore	Pts: Kaukėnas 27; Rebs: Polonara 8 Asts: De Nicolao 6 PIR: Kaukėnas 30	Arena: Mediolanum Forum; Attendance: 12,500; Referees: Luigi Lamonica, Enrico Sabetta, Massimiliano Filippini

Starters:			Pts	Reb	Ast
SG	5	(Italy) Alessandro Gentile	15	4	4
PG	9	(Lithuania) Mantas Kalnietis	8	1	4
SG	21	(United States) Rakim Sanders	13	2	0
SF	43	(Croatia) Krunoslav Simon	4	8	5
C	51	(Uruguay) Esteban Batista	6	6	0
Reserves:					
PF	1	(United States) Jamel McLean	13	6	2
PG	3	(Croatia) Oliver Lafayette	8	2	2
SF	7	(Italy) Bruno Cerella	2	0	2
C	13	(Serbia) Milan Mačvan	14	7	0
SG	14	(Italy) Manuel Pastori	DNP		
C	15	(Italy) Daniele Magro	DNP		
PG	20	(Italy) Andrea Cinciarini	4	1	1
Head coach:
(Croatia) Jasmin Repeša

EA7 Emporio Armani Milano	Grissin Bon Reggio Emilia

Starters:			Pts	Reb	Ast
SF	4	(Italy) Pietro Aradori	2	1	1
PF	6	(Italy) Achille Polonara	9	8	3
C	7	(Lithuania) Darjuš Lavrinovič	7	0	0
PG	9	(Italy) Andrea De Nicolao	6	3	6
SG	13	(Lithuania) Rimantas Kaukėnas	27	0	5
Reserves:					
PG	5	(United States) Derek Needham	6	3	0
PG	8	(Italy) Amedeo Della Valle	6	0	4
PG	10	(Italy) Salvatore Parrillo	0	0	0
C	12	(Belarus) Vladimir Veremeenko	8	5	0
PG	14	(Italy) Luca Degli Esposti Castori	DNP		
SF	15	(Latvia) Ojārs Siliņš	9	1	2
PF	17	(Italy) Lever Alessandro	DNP		
Head coach:
(Italy) Massimiliano Menetti

=== Game 2 ===
5 June 2016	EA7 Emporio Armani Milano	94–73 (Series: EA7 Milano leads series, 2–0)	Grissin Bon Reggio Emilia	Milan
20:45 (CEST)	Scoring by quarter: 23–24, 28–21, 18–17, 25–11
Rai Sport 1 Sky Sport	Pts: Gentile 23; Rebs: Kalnietis 6 Asts: Lafayette 6 PIR: Gentile, Sanders 26	Boxscore	Pts: Della Valle 20; Rebs: De Nicolao 5 Asts: three players 3 PIR: De Nicolao 14	Arena: Mediolanum Forum; Attendance: 12,500; Referees: Paolo Taurino, Roberto Begnis, Gianluca Sardella

Starters:			Pts	Reb	Ast
SG	5	(Italy) Alessandro Gentile	23	4	1
PG	9	(Lithuania) Mantas Kalnietis	14	6	3
SG	21	(United States) Rakim Sanders	19	5	1
SF	43	(Croatia) Krunoslav Simon	10	2	1
C	51	(Uruguay) Esteban Batista	2	1	1
Reserves:					
PF	1	(United States) Jamel McLean	6	5	2
PG	3	(Croatia) Oliver Lafayette	12	2	6
SF	7	(Italy) Bruno Cerella	3	2	0
C	13	(Serbia) Milan Mačvan	0	2	0
PG	14	(Italy) Francesco Villa	0	0	0
C	15	(Italy) Daniele Magro	0	2	0
PG	20	(Italy) Andrea Cinciarini	5	0	1
Head coach:
(Croatia) Jasmin Repeša

EA7 Emporio Armani Milano	Grissin Bon Reggio Emilia

Starters:			Pts	Reb	Ast
PF	6	(Italy) Achille Polonara	5	3	1
PG	8	(Italy) Amedeo Della Valle	20	0	3
PG	9	(Italy) Andrea De Nicolao	12	5	3
C	12	(Belarus) Vladimir Veremeenko	11	2	3
SG	13	(Lithuania) Rimantas Kaukėnas	9	0	2
Reserves:					
SF	4	(Italy) Pietro Aradori	DNP		
PG	5	(United States) Derek Needham	3	0	0
C	7	(Lithuania) Darjuš Lavrinovič	6	2	0
PG	10	(Italy) Salvatore Parrillo	0	1	0
PG	14	(Italy) Luca Degli Esposti Castori	0	0	0
SF	15	(Latvia) Ojārs Siliņš	7	3	2
PF	17	(Italy) Lever Alessandro	0	0	0
Head coach:
(Italy) Massimiliano Menetti

=== Game 3 ===
7 June 2016	Grissin Bon Reggio Emilia	81–72 (Series: EA7 Milano leads series, 2–1)	EA7 Emporio Armani Milano	Reggio Emilia
20:45 (CEST)	Scoring by quarter: 22–18, 21–15, 15–18, 23–21
Rai Sport 1 Sky Sport	Pts: Lavrinovič 20; Rebs: Polonara 10; Asts: Needham 6 PIR: Della Valle 20	Boxscore	Pts: Simon 14; Rebs: Kalnietis 6 Asts: Gentile, Cinciarini 4 PIR: three players 15	Arena: PalaBigi; Attendance: 3,800; Referees: Tolga Sahin, Alessandro Martolini, Carmelo Lo Guzzo

Starters:			Pts	Reb	Ast
PF	6	(Italy) Achille Polonara	9	10	1
PG	8	(Italy) Amedeo Della Valle	17	4	5
PG	9	(Italy) Andrea De Nicolao	5	5	3
C	12	(Belarus) Vladimir Veremeenko	2	3	1
SG	13	(Lithuania) Rimantas Kaukėnas	10	5	3
Reserves:					
SF	4	(Italy) Pietro Aradori	DNP		
PG	5	(United States) Derek Needham	10	4	6
C	7	(Lithuania) Darjuš Lavrinovič	20	0	2
PG	10	(Italy) Salvatore Parrillo	0	1	1
PG	14	(Italy) Luca Degli Esposti Castori	DNP		
SF	15	(Latvia) Ojārs Siliņš	8	3	0
PF	17	(Italy) Lever Alessandro	DNP		
Head coach:
(Italy) Massimiliano Menetti

Grissin Bon Reggio Emilia	EA7 Emporio Armani Milano

Starters:			Pts	Reb	Ast
SG	5	(Italy) Alessandro Gentile	2	2	4
PG	9	(Lithuania) Mantas Kalnietis	13	6	2
PG	20	(Italy) Andrea Cinciarini	9	0	4
SG	21	(United States) Rakim Sanders	3	5	3
C	51	(Uruguay) Esteban Batista	3	1	1
Reserves:					
PF	1	(United States) Jamel McLean	13	3	0
PG	3	(Croatia) Oliver Lafayette	4	1	1
SF	7	(Italy) Bruno Cerella	3	0	1
C	13	(Serbia) Milan Mačvan	8	4	0
SF	14	(Italy) Restelli Lorenzo	DNP		
C	15	(Italy) Daniele Magro	0	0	1
SF	43	(Croatia) Krunoslav Simon	14	0	2
Head coach:
(Croatia) Jasmin Repeša

=== Game 4 ===
9 June 2016	Grissin Bon Reggio Emilia	81–76 (Series: Series tied, 2–2)	EA7 Emporio Armani Milano	Reggio Emilia
20:45 (CEST)	Scoring by quarter: 21–22, 20–17, 18–16, 22–21
Rai Sport 1 Sky Sport	Pts: Aradori, Lavrinovič 15; Rebs: Polonara 8 Asts: De Nicolao 4 PIR: Aradori 23	Boxscore	Pts: Sanders 21; Rebs: Batista 7 Asts: Cerella, Kalnietis 4 PIR: McLean 18	Arena: PalaBigi; Attendance: 3,800; Referees: Saverio Lanzarini, Gianluca Mattioli, Manuel Mazzoni

Starters:			Pts	Reb	Ast
PF	6	(Italy) Achille Polonara	10	8	1
PG	8	(Italy) Amedeo Della Valle	13	6	1
PG	9	(Italy) Andrea De Nicolao	4	1	4
C	12	(Belarus) Vladimir Veremeenko	10	2	1
SG	13	(Lithuania) Rimantas Kaukėnas	11	3	2
Reserves:					
SF	4	(Italy) Pietro Aradori	15	4	2
PG	5	(United States) Derek Needham	3	1	2
C	7	(Lithuania) Darjuš Lavrinovič	15	6	1
PG	10	(Italy) Salvatore Parrillo	0	0	1
PG	14	(Italy) Luca Degli Esposti Castori	DNP		
SF	15	(Latvia) Ojārs Siliņš	0	4	0
PF	17	(Italy) Lever Alessandro	DNP		
Head coach:
(Italy) Massimiliano Menetti

Grissin Bon Reggio Emilia	EA7 Emporio Armani Milano

Starters:			Pts	Reb	Ast
SG	5	(Italy) Alessandro Gentile	7	6	1
PG	9	(Lithuania) Mantas Kalnietis	11	4	4
PG	20	(Italy) Andrea Cinciarini	0	5	2
SG	21	(United States) Rakim Sanders	21	6	0
C	51	(Uruguay) Esteban Batista	5	7	0
Reserves:					
PF	1	(United States) Jamel McLean	17	2	0
PG	3	(Croatia) Oliver Lafayette	3	3	1
SF	7	(Italy) Bruno Cerella	0	2	4
C	13	(Serbia) Milan Mačvan	2	5	0
SF	14	(Italy) Davide Vercesi	DNP		
C	15	(Italy) Daniele Magro	DNP		
SF	43	(Croatia) Krunoslav Simon	10	2	3
Head coach:
(Croatia) Jasmin Repeša

=== Game 5 ===
11 June 2016	EA7 Emporio Armani Milano	97–73 (Series: EA7 Milano leads series, 3–2)	Grissin Bon Reggio Emilia	Milan
20:45 (CEST)	Scoring by quarter: 29–8, 23–23, 22–29, 23–13
Rai Sport 1 Sky Sport	Pts: Kalnietis 16; Rebs: Kalnietis, Simon 8 Asts: Simon 4 PIR: Kalnietis 26	Boxscore	Pts: Aradori 14; Rebs: Polonara 9 Asts: De Nicolao 4 PIR: Aradori, Polonara 17	Arena: Mediolanum Forum; Attendance: 12,500; Referees: Luigi Lamonica, Tolga Sahin, Emanuele Aronne

Starters:			Pts	Reb	Ast
SG	5	(Italy) Alessandro Gentile	11	3	3
PG	9	(Lithuania) Mantas Kalnietis	16	8	3
PG	20	(Italy) Andrea Cinciarini	4	1	0
SG	21	(United States) Rakim Sanders	14	4	2
C	51	(Uruguay) Esteban Batista	8	4	1
Reserves:					
PF	1	(United States) Jamel McLean	0	1	2
PG	3	(Croatia) Oliver Lafayette	12	2	1
SF	7	(Italy) Bruno Cerella	8	2	0
C	13	(Serbia) Milan Mačvan	10	5	3
SG	14	(Italy) Andrea Pecchia	0	0	0
C	15	(Italy) Daniele Magro	0	0	0
SF	43	(Croatia) Krunoslav Simon	14	8	4
Head coach:
(Croatia) Jasmin Repeša

EA7 Emporio Armani Milano	Grissin Bon Reggio Emilia

Starters:			Pts	Reb	Ast
PF	6	(Italy) Achille Polonara	10	9	1
PG	8	(Italy) Amedeo Della Valle	11	3	2
PG	9	(Italy) Andrea De Nicolao	10	1	4
C	12	(Belarus) Vladimir Veremeenko	4	4	0
SG	13	(Lithuania) Rimantas Kaukėnas	7	0	2
Reserves:					
SF	4	(Italy) Pietro Aradori	14	2	1
PG	5	(United States) Derek Needham	0	0	0
C	7	(Lithuania) Darjuš Lavrinovič	12	6	0
PG	10	(Italy) Salvatore Parrillo	2	0	0
PG	14	(Italy) Luca Degli Esposti Castori	0	0	0
SF	15	(Latvia) Ojārs Siliņš	3	2	1
PF	17	(Italy) Lever Alessandro	0	0	0
Head coach:
(Italy) Massimiliano Menetti

=== Game 6 ===
13 June 2016	Grissin Bon Reggio Emilia	70–74 (Series: EA7 Milano won series, 4–2)	EA7 Emporio Armani Milano	Reggio Emilia
20:45 (CEST)	Scoring by quarter: 19–21, 19–8, 12–16, 20–29
Rai Sport 1 Sky Sport	Pts: Kaukėnas 18; Rebs: Polonara 8 Asts: De Nicolao, Kaukėnas 4 PIR: Kaukėnas 20	Boxscore	Pts: Gentile 16; Rebs: Batista 9 Asts: Sanders 5 PIR: Batista 23	Arena: PalaBigi; Attendance: 3,800; Referees: Enrico Sabetta, Saverio Lanzarini, Alessandro Martolini

Starters:			Pts	Reb	Ast
PF	6	(Italy) Achille Polonara	12	8	1
PG	8	(Italy) Amedeo Della Valle	13	4	2
PG	9	(Italy) Andrea De Nicolao	3	3	4
C	12	(Belarus) Vladimir Veremeenko	6	7	1
SG	13	(Lithuania) Rimantas Kaukėnas	18	3	4
Reserves:					
SF	4	(Italy) Pietro Aradori	8	6	1
PG	5	(United States) Derek Needham	5	3	0
C	7	(Lithuania) Darjuš Lavrinovič	2	3	1
PG	10	(Italy) Salvatore Parrillo	0	0	0
PG	14	(Italy) Federico Bonacini	DNP		
SF	15	(Latvia) Ojārs Siliņš	3	2	1
Head coach:
(Italy) Massimiliano Menetti

Grissin Bon Reggio Emilia	EA7 Emporio Armani Milano

Serie A Finals MVP
(United States) Rakim Sanders
Game rules
Game played under FIBA rules.

2015–16 Lega Basket Serie A Winners

EA7 Emporio Armani Milano
27th title

Starters:			Pts	Reb	Ast
SG	5	(Italy) Alessandro Gentile	16	4	2
PG	9	(Lithuania) Mantas Kalnietis	7	2	1
PG	20	(Italy) Andrea Cinciarini	3	4	2
SG	21	(United States) Rakim Sanders	13	2	5
C	51	(Uruguay) Esteban Batista	10	9	4
Reserves:					
PF	1	(United States) Jamel McLean	0	0	0
PG	3	(Croatia) Oliver Lafayette	3	4	1
SF	7	(Italy) Bruno Cerella	0	2	0
C	13	(Serbia) Milan Mačvan	7	2	2
SF	14	(Italy) Andrea Pecchia	DNP		
C	15	(Italy) Daniele Magro	DNP		
SF	43	(Croatia) Krunoslav Simon	15	7	4
Head coach:
(Croatia) Jasmin Repeša

== Rosters ==
=== EA7 Emporio Armani Milano ===
Olimpia Milano roster
Players
Coaches

Pos.	No.	Nat.	Name	Ht.	Wt.	Age
F/C	1	(United States)	McLean, Jamel	2.03 m (6 ft 8 in)	104 kg (229 lb)	37 – 18 April 1988
CG	3	(Croatia)	Lafayette, Oliver	1.88 m (6 ft 2 in)	84 kg (185 lb)	41 – 6 May 1984
G/F	5	(Italy)	Gentile, Alessandro	2.00 m (6 ft 7 in)	104 kg (229 lb)	32 – 12 November 1992
G/F	7	(Italy)	Cerella, Bruno	1.94 m (6 ft 4 in)	93 kg (205 lb)	39 – 30 July 1986
PG	9	(Lithuania)	Kalnietis, Mantas	1.95 m (6 ft 5 in)	93 kg (205 lb)	39 – 6 September 1986
F/C	13	(Serbia)	Mačvan, Milan	2.06 m (6 ft 9 in)	120 kg (265 lb)	35 – 16 November 1989
C	15	(Italy)	Magro, Daniele	2.08 m (6 ft 10 in)	109 kg (240 lb)	38 – 14 April 1987
PG	20	(Italy)	Cinciarini, Andrea	1.93 m (6 ft 4 in)	84 kg (185 lb)	39 – 21 June 1986
G/F	21	(United States)	Sanders, Rakim	1.93 m (6 ft 4 in)	95 kg (209 lb)	36 – 8 July 1989
SG	22	(United States)	Jenkins, Charles	1.91 m (6 ft 3 in)	100 kg (220 lb)	36 – 28 February 1989
C	27	(Croatia)	Barać, Stanko	2.17 m (7 ft 1 in)	127 kg (280 lb)	39 – 14 August 1986
G/F	43	(Croatia)	Simon, Krunoslav	1.97 m (6 ft 6 in)	100 kg (220 lb)	40 – 24 June 1985
C	51	(Uruguay)	Batista, Esteban	2.08 m (6 ft 10 in)	122 kg (269 lb)	42 – 2 September 1983

Head coach

- (Croatia) Jasmin Repeša

Assistant coach(es)

- (Italy) Mario Fioretti
- (Italy) Massimo Cancellieri

Athletic trainer(s)

- (Italy) Giustino Danesi

Legend

- (C) Team captain
- Injured

- Roster
Updated: January 04, 2016

=== Grissin Bon Reggio Emilia ===
Grissin Bon Reggio Emilia roster
Players
Coaches

Pos.	No.	Nat.	Name	Ht.	Wt.	Age
G/F	4	(Italy)	Aradori, Pietro	1.94 m (6 ft 4 in)	95 kg (209 lb)	36 – 9 December 1988
PG	5	(United States)	Needham, Derek	1.80 m (5 ft 11 in)	82 kg (181 lb)	34 – 20 November 1990
PG		(Italy)	Bonacini, Federico	1.89 m (6 ft 2 in)	79 kg (174 lb)	26 – 23 January 1999
F	6	(Italy)	Polonara, Achille	2.03 m (6 ft 8 in)	90 kg (198 lb)	33 – 23 November 1991
F/C	7	(Lithuania)	Lavrinovič, Darjuš	2.12 m (6 ft 11 in)	110 kg (243 lb)	45 – 1 November 1979
G	8	(Italy)	Della Valle, Amedeo	1.94 m (6 ft 4 in)	86 kg (190 lb)	32 – 11 April 1993
PG	9	(Italy)	De Nicolao, Andrea	1.85 m (6 ft 1 in)	75 kg (165 lb)	34 – 21 August 1991
PG	10	(Italy)	Parrillo, Salvatore	1.90 m (6 ft 3 in)	85 kg (187 lb)	32 – 2 December 1992
SG	11	(Latvia)	Strautiņš, Artūrs	1.96 m (6 ft 5 in)	82 kg (181 lb)	26 – 23 October 1998
C	12	(Belarus)	Veremeenko, Vladimir	2.08 m (6 ft 10 in)	107 kg (236 lb)	41 – 21 July 1984
SG	13	(Lithuania)	Kaukėnas, Rimantas	1.92 m (6 ft 4 in)	92 kg (203 lb)	48 – 11 April 1977
SF	15	(Latvia)	Siliņš, Ojārs	2.04 m (6 ft 8 in)	98 kg (216 lb)	32 – 20 July 1993
PF	17	(Italy)	Lever, Alessandro	2.02 m (6 ft 8 in)	104 kg (229 lb)	26 – 4 December 1998
PG	18	(Italy)	Gentile, Stefano	1.91 m (6 ft 3 in)	90 kg (198 lb)	36 – 20 September 1989
C	19	(Estonia)	Mitt, Arnold	2.07 m (6 ft 9 in)	102 kg (225 lb)	27 – 2 June 1998
C	20	(Montenegro)	Golubović, Vladimir	2.12 m (6 ft 11 in)	113 kg (249 lb)	39 – 24 February 1986

Head coach

- (Italy) Massimiliano Menetti

Assistant coach(es)

- (Italy) Devis Cagnardi
- (Lithuania) Donatas Slanina

Legend

- (C) Team captain
- Injured

- Roster
Updated: 1 September 2015
