= 2015–16 Lega Basket Serie A =

Lega Basket Serie A
- Season: 2015–16
- Duration: 4 October 2015 - June 2016
- Games played: 240 (Regular season); 24–41 (Playoffs)
- Teams: 16
- TV partners: RAI, Sky Italia

Regular season
- Top seed: EA7 Emporio Armani Milano
- Season MVP: (United States) James Nunnally
- Relegated: Obiettivo Lavoro Bologna

Finals
- Champions: EA7 Emporio Armani Milano (27th title)
- Runners-up: Grissin Bon Reggio Emilia
- Semi-finalists: Umana Reyer Venezia; Sidigas Avellino
- Finals MVP: (United States) Rakim Sanders

Statistical leaders
Points	(United States) Austin Daye	21.3
Rebounds	(United States) Dario Hunt	9.9
Assists	(United States) Peyton Siva	6.5
Index Rating	(United States) Austin Daye	22.4

Records
- Biggest home win: Milano 87–50 Sassari (2 January 2016)
- Biggest away win: Brindisi 53–79 Reggio Emilia (13 December 2015)
- Highest scoring: Bologna 115–109 Brindisi (24 January 2016)
- Highest attendance: 12,683; Milano 94–90 Torino (6 March 2016)
- Average attendance: 3,967
- All statistics correct as of 13 June 2016.

The 2015–16 Lega Basket Serie A, known for sponsorship reasons as the Serie A BEKO, was the 94th season of the Lega Basket Serie A, the highest professional basketball league in Italy.

The regular season started on 4 October 2015 and finished on 4 May 2015, with the playoffs starting on 7 May (dependent on an Italian club qualifying for the 2016 Euroleague Final Four) and finished between 13 and 16 June, depending on results.

Banco di Sardegna Sassari was the defending champion.

EA7 Emporio Armani Milano won their 27th title by beating Grissin Bon Reggio Emilia in game 6 of the finals.

== Teams ==
=== Venues and locations ===
Lega Basket Serie A 2015–16 – Club Locations

Team	Home city	Arena	Capacity	2014–15 season
Acqua Vitasnella Cantù	Cantù	Mapooro Arena	3,910	Quarterfinals 2015–16 playoffs
Banco di Sardegna Sassari	Sassari	PalaSerradimigni	5,000	Serie A Champions
Betaland Capo d'Orlando	Capo d'Orlando	PalaFantozzi	3,613	14th in Serie A
Consultinvest Pesaro	Pesaro	Adriatic Arena	6,119	15th in Serie A
Dolomiti Energia Trento	Trento	PalaTrento	4,360	Quarterfinals 2015–16 playoffs
EA7 Emporio Armani Milano	Milan	Mediolanum Forum	12,700	Semifinals 2015–16 playoffs
Enel Brindisi	Brindisi	PalaPentassuglia	3,534	Quarterfinals 2015–16 playoffs
Giorgio Tesi Group Pistoia	Pistoia	PallaCarrara	4,000	9th in Serie A
Grissin Bon Reggio Emilia	Reggio Emilia	PalaBigi	3,800	Runners-up 2015–16 playoffs
Manital Torino	Turin	PalaRuffini	4,500	Serie A2 playoffs winner
Obiettivo Lavoro Bologna	Bologna	Unipol Arena	8,400	Quarterfinals 2015–16 playoffs
Openjobmetis Varese	Varese	PalaWhirlpool	5,300	11th in Serie A
Pasta Reggia Caserta ◆ (Note: Relegated in 2014–15 but reprieved after Acea Roma renounced its position in the league.)	Caserta	PalaMaggiò	6,387	16th in Serie A
Sidigas Avellino	Avellino	PalaDelMauro	5,300	13th in Serie A
Umana Reyer Venezia	Mestre	Taliercio	3,509	Semifinals 2015–16 playoffs
Vanoli Cremona	Cremona	PalaRadi	3,527	12th in Serie A

◆ Pasta Reggia Caserta took the place of Acea Roma which has renounced to the 2015–16 Serie A.

=== Personnel and sponsorship ===
Team	Chairman	Head coach	Kit manufacturer	Shirt sponsor
Acqua Vitasnella Cantù	(Russia) Dmitry Gerasimenko	(Russia) Sergei Bazarevich	Macron	Acqua Vitasnella
Banco di Sardegna Sassari	(Italy) Stefano Sardara	(Italy) Federico Pasquini	Eyesportwear	Banco di Sardegna
Betaland Capo d'Orlando	(Italy) Roberto Enzo Sindoni	(Italy) Gennaro Di Carlo	Legea	Betaland
Consultinvest Pesaro	(Italy) Ario Costa	(Italy) Riccardo Paolini	Erreà	Consultinvest
Dolomiti Energia Trento	(Italy) Luigi Longhi	(Italy) Maurizio Buscaglia	Spalding	Dolomiti Energia
EA7 Emporio Armani Milano	(Italy) Livio Proli	(Croatia) Jasmin Repeša	Armani	EA7 Emporio Armani
Enel Brindisi	(Italy) Fernando Marino	(Italy) Piero Bucchi	Bitre Sport	Enel
Giorgio Tesi Group Pistoia	(Italy) Roberto Maltinti	(Italy) Vincenzo Esposito	Erreà	Giorgio Tesi Group
Grissin Bon Reggio Emilia	(Italy) Maria Licia Ferrarini	(Italy) Massimiliano Menetti	Sportika	Grissin Bon
Manital Torino	(Italy) Antonio Forni	(Italy) Francesco Vitucci	Spalding	Manital
Obiettivo Lavoro Bologna	(Italy) Alberto Bucci	(Italy) Giorgio Valli	Macron	Obiettivo Lavoro
Openjobmetis Varese	(Italy) Stefano Coppa	(Italy) Paolo Moretti	Spalding	Openjobmetis
Pasta Reggia Caserta	(Italy) Nicola Cecere	(Italy) Sandro Dell'Agnello	–	Pasta Reggia
Sidigas Avellino	(Italy) Giuseppe Sampietro	(Italy) Stefano Sacripanti	Joma	Sidigas
Umana Reyer Venezia	(Italy) Federico Casarin	(Italy) Walter De Raffaele	Erreà	Umana
Vanoli Cremona	(Italy) Aldo Vanoli	(Italy) Cesare Pancotto	Erreà	Vanoli Ferramenta

=== Managerial Changes ===
Team	Outgoing manager	Manner of departure	Date of vacancy	Position in table	Replaced with	Date of appointment
Acqua Vitasnella Cantù	(Italy) Stefano Sacripanti	Resigned	6 June 2015	Pre-season	(Italy) Fabio Corbani	11 June 2015
Giorgio Tesi Group Pistoia	(Italy) Paolo Moretti	End of contract	13 June 2015	Pre-season	(Italy) Vincenzo Esposito	22 July 2015
Pasta Reggia Caserta	(Italy) Vincenzo Esposito	End of contract	21 June 2015	Pre-season	(Italy) Sandro Dell'Agnello	23 June 2015
Openjobmetis Varese	(Italy) Attilio Caja	End of contract	24 June 2015	Pre-season	(Italy) Paolo Moretti	25 June 2015
EA7 Emporio Armani Milano	(Italy) Luca Banchi	Resigned	25 June 2015	Pre-season	(Croatia) Jasmin Repeša	6 July 2015
Sidigas Avellino	(Italy) Francesco Vitucci	Resigned	1 July 2015	Pre-season	(Italy) Stefano Sacripanti	2 July 2015
Banco di Sardegna Sassari	(Italy) Romeo Sacchetti	Sacked	21 November 2015	6th (4–3)	(Italy) Marco Calvani	24 November 2015
Manital Torino	(Italy) Luca Bechi	Sacked	14 December 2015	16th (2–9)	(Italy) Francesco Vitucci	18 December 2015
Acqua Vitasnella Cantù	(Italy) Fabio Corbani	Sacked	18 December 2015	11th (4–7)	(Russia) Sergei Bazarevich	18 December 2015
Betaland Capo d'Orlando	(Italy) Giulio Graccioli	Sacked	28 December 2015	15th (4–10)	(Italy) Gennaro Di Carlo	30 December 2015
Umana Reyer Venezia	(Italy) Carlo Recalcati	Sacked	14 February 2016	9th (10–10)	(Italy) Walter De Raffaele	14 February 2016
Banco di Sardegna Sassari	(Italy) Marco Calvani	Sacked	7 March 2016	9th (11–11)	(Italy) Federico Pasquini	7 March 2016

== Changes from 2014–15 ==
The season saw historic public broadcaster RAI (one match every week) joined by Sky Italia (two matches every week) in broadcasting the league's games for television, after an agreement with Lega Basket covering the 2015–16 and 2016–17 seasons.

== Rules ==
The season consists of a home-and-away schedule of 30 games, followed by an eight-team playoff round. The Quarterfinals are best-of-five, while the semifinals and finals series are best-of-seven. The last placed club is relegated, and is replaced by the winner of the playoffs of the second-level Serie A2 Basket.

Each team is allowed either five or seven foreign players under two formulas:

1. 5 foreigners from countries outside the European Union
2. 3 foreigners from countries outside the E.U., 4 foreigners from E.U. countries (also including those from countries signatory of the Cotonou Agreement)

In early September 2015, nine squads had chosen the 5+5 formula and seven the 3+4+5.

== Regular season ==
=== Standings ===
Pos	Team	Pld	W	L	PF	PA	PR	Pts	Qualification or relegation
1	EA7 Emporio Armani Milano	30	22	8	2452	2205	1.112	44	Qualification to playoffs
2	Grissin Bon Reggio Emilia	30	21	9	2424	2263	1.071	42	Qualification to playoffs
3	Sidigas Avellino	30	20	10	2389	2307	1.036	40	Qualification to playoffs
4	Vanoli Cremona	30	19	11	2258	2213	1.020	38	Qualification to playoffs
5	Umana Reyer Venezia	30	16	14	2320	2230	1.040	32	Qualification to playoffs
6	Giorgio Tesi Group Pistoia	30	16	14	2311	2320	0.996	32	Qualification to playoffs
7	Banco di Sardegna Sassari	30	16	14	2509	2439	1.029	32	Qualification to playoffs
8	Dolomiti Energia Trento	30	15	15	2292	2274	1.008	30	Qualification to playoffs
9	Openjobmetis Varese	30	14	16	2252	2344	0.961	28	
10	Enel Brindisi	30	13	17	2320	2351	0.987	26	
11	Acqua Vitasnella Cantù	30	12	18	2422	2405	1.007	24	
12	Consultinvest Pesaro	30	12	18	2282	2355	0.969	24	
13	Betaland Capo d'Orlando	30	11	19	2058	2205	0.933	22	
14	Pasta Reggia Caserta	30	11	19	2171	2288	0.949	22	
15	Manital Torino	30	11	19	2261	2401	0.942	22	
16	Obiettivo Lavoro Bologna	30	11	19	2239	2360	0.949	22	Relegation to Serie A2

Updated to match(es) played on 04 May 2016. Source: Legabasket

=== Calendar ===
Day one
04-10-15		17-01-16
97-90	Sassari-Cremona	73-72
80-73	Trento-Milano	79-83
69-65	Bologna-Venezia	69-73
85-78	Pistoia-Brindisi	71-67
51-58	Varese-Caserta	77-70
77-73	Avellino-Pesaro	88-82
73-65	Capo d'Orlando-Cantù	56-84
72-96	Torino-Reggio Emilia	72-77

Day four
25-10-15		07-02-16
73-51	Venezia-Cremona	73-74
71-81	Brindisi-Trento	92-89
80-70	Cantù-Torino	72-79
76-70	Pistoia-Avellino	76-84
70-86	Varese-Sassari	69-91
68-62	Capo d'Orlando-Reggio Emilia	66-75
68-63	Pesaro-Bologna	75-79
70-80	Caserta-Milano	86-91

Day seven
15-11-15		06-03-16
87-83	Venezia-Reggio Emilia	96-98
89-63	Trento-Varese	82-96
84-82	Cantù-Avellino	77-81
92-87	Bologna-Sassari	91-85
93-84	Pistoia-Caserta	94-88
65-69	Capo d'Orlando-Cremona	73-74
75-70	Pesaro-Brindisi	76-81
85-83	Torino-Milano	90-94

Day ten
06-12-15		26-03-16
73-88	Sassari-Trento	81-93
74-72	Reggio Emilia-Milano	80-84
95-103	Venezia-Cantù	76-72
81-93	Varese-Avellino	71-89
73-63	Cremona-Bologna	66-73
74-77	Capo d'Orlando-Brindisi	70-69
87-88	Torino-Pistoia	80-70
73-69	Caserta-Pesaro	72-71

Day thirteen
23-12-15		17-04-16
94-70	Sassari-Reggio Emilia	102-98
74-63	Trento-Capo d'Orlando	82-81
72-69	Brindisi-Torino	75-83
85-77	Bologna-Cantù	73-89
70-68	Pistoia-Venezia	68-74
87-82	Varese-Cremona	79-70
62-70	Avellino-Caserta	92-87
69-66	Pesaro-Milano	78-82

Day two
11-10-15		24-01-16
87-68	Reggio Emilia-Avellino	67-75
90-62	Milano-Varese	86-64
77-76	Venezia-Capo d'Orlando	53-55
81-54	Brindisi-Bologna	109-115
75-86	Cantù-Sassari	86-78
76-83	Cremona-Trento	78-71
73-74	Pesaro-Pistoia	75-77
63-65	Caserta-Torino	87-83

Day five
01-11-15		14-02-16
70-82	Sassari-Venezia	74-70
83-66	Reggio Emilia-Pesaro	80-90
89-71	Milano-Pistoia	85-80
100-103	Cantù-Brindisi	68-86
85-90	Bologna-Caserta	65-69
79-66	Avellino-Trento	80-68
62-66	Capo d'Orlando-Varese	82-81
80-93	Torino-Cremona	50-66

Day eight
22-11-15		13-03-16
106-80	Sassari-Pesaro	65-86
69-65	Reggio Emilia-Trento	90-84
87-65	Milano-Venezia	85-81
82-75	Varese-Bologna	67-76
83-81	Avellino-Brindisi	89-82
82-66	Cremona-Pistoia	79-72
69-71	Torino-Capo d'Orlando	73-86
71-73	Caserta-Cantù	69-92

Day eleven
13-12-15		03-04-16
84-57	Milano-Capo d'Orlando	71-78
80-66	Trento-Bologna	75-68
53-79	Brindisi-Reggio Emilia	59-76
74-82	Cantù-Cremona	85-95
67-65	Pistoia-Varese	78-91
86-79	Avellino-Torino	74-78
82-75	Pesaro-Venezia	100-96
70-86	Caserta-Sassari	75-87

Day fourteen
27-12-15		24-04-16
80-75	Sassari-Pistoia	68-77
86-69	Reggio Emilia-Varese	69-77
77-66	Venezia-Trento	67-62
90-65	Cantù-Pesaro	90-96
76-91	Cremona-Milano	77-81
55-73	Capo d'Orlando-Avellino	69-85
75-70	Torino-Bologna	54-73
80-75	Caserta-Brindisi	55-73

Day three
18-10-15		31-01-16
78-92	Sassari-Brindisi	82-88
97-92	Reggio Emilia-Cantù	74-70
54-74	Trento-Pistoia	69-64
64-76	Bologna-Capo d'Orlando	62-89
88-81	Varese-Pesaro	71-76
60-83	Avellino-Milano	81-80
69-60	Cremona-Caserta	64-73
62-84	Torino-Venezia	57-73

Day six
08-11-15		28-02-16
87-72	Milano-Bologna	101-85
81-74	Trento-Pesaro	72-79
89-84	Brindisi-Venezia	75-97
95-89	Pistoia-Cantù	74-82
92-78	Varese-Torino	84-72
88-90	Avellino-Sassari	95-94
68-61	Cremona-Reggio Emilia	77-86
78-66	Caserta-Capo d'Orlando	59-65

Day nine
29-11-15		20-03-16
65-58	Venezia-Caserta	80-73
93-85	Trento-Torino	69-71
80-74	Brindisi-Varese	69-80
71-78	Cantù-Milano	65-72
81-66	Bologna-Avellino	74-82
77-80	Pistoia-Reggio Emilia	71-94
52-77	Capo d'Orlando-Sassari	63-92
74-86	Pesaro-Cremona	72-77

Day twelve
20-12-15		10-04-16
87-62	Reggio Emilia-Caserta	87-82
77-72	Milano-Brindisi	50-64
84-58	Venezia-Varese	68-79
87-77	Cantù-Trento	75-79
76-72	Bologna-Pistoia	76-88
64-58	Cremona-Avellino	70-84
69-72	Capo d'Orlando-Pesaro	65-70
86-83	Torino-Sassari	98-112

Day fifteen
03-01-16		04-05-16
87-50	Milano-Sassari	80-83
71-66	Trento-Caserta	70-73
76-81	Brindisi-Cremona	61-76
67-77	Bologna-Reggio Emilia	78-82
103-75	Pistoia-Capo d'Orlando	65-58
79-66	Varese-Cantù	79-89
88-76	Avellino-Venezia	77-86
69-76	Pesaro-Torino	66-83

=== Statistical leaders ===
As of 04 May 2016.

==== Points ====
Rank	Name	Team	PPG
1.	(United States) Austin Daye	Consultinvest Pesaro	21.3
2.	(United States) Adrian Banks	Enel Brindisi	19.0
3.	(United States) James Nunnally	Sidigas Avellino	18.4
4.	(United States) D. J. White	Manital Torino	17.1
5.	(Poland) David Logan	Banco di Sardegna Sassari	17.0

==== Assists ====
Rank	Name	Team	APG
1.	(United States) Peyton Siva	Pasta Reggia Caserta	6.5
2.	(United States) Ronald Moore	Giorgio Tesi Group Pistoia	6.1
3.	(Puerto Rico) Walter Hodge	Acqua Vitasnella Cantù	5.5
4.	(United States) Mike Green	Umana Reyer Venezia	5.3
5.	(Croatia) Roko Ukić	Acqua Vitasnella Cantù	5.2

==== Steals ====
Rank	Name	Team	SPG
1.	(United States) Peyton Siva	Pasta Reggia Caserta	2.0
2.	(United States) Deron Washington	Vanoli Cremona	2.0
3.	(Poland) David Logan	Banco di Sardegna Sassari	1.9
4.	(United States) Jerome Dyson	Manital Torino	1.7
5.	(Equatorial Guinea) Bobby Jones	Pasta Reggia Caserta	1.7

==== Rebounds ====
Rank	Name	Team	RPG
1.	(United States) Dario Hunt	Pasta Reggia Caserta	9.9
2.	(United States) Austin Daye	Consultinvest Pesaro	9.0
3.	(United States) Alex Oriakhi	Betaland Capo d'Orlando	8.8
4.	(United States) D. J. White	Manital Torino	8.6
5.	(United States) JaJuan Johnson	Acqua Vitasnella Cantù	8.2

==== Blocks ====
Rank	Name	Team	BPG
1.	(Italy) Riccardo Cervi	Sidigas Avellino	1.4
2.	(United States) Dario Hunt	Pasta Reggia Caserta	1.4
3.	(United States) JaJuan Johnson	Acqua Vitasnella Cantù	1.4
4.	(Nigeria) Ndudi Ebi	Manital Torino	1.3
5.	(United States) Alex Kirk	Giorgio Tesi Group Pistoia	1.3

==== Valuation ====
Rank	Name	Team	VPG
1.	(United States) Austin Daye	Consultinvest Pesaro	22.4
2.	(United States) D. J. White	Manital Torino	21.7
3.	(United States) Adrian Banks	Enel Brindisi	19.7
4.	(Poland) David Logan	Banco di Sardegna Sassari	19.4
5.	(United States) Alex Kirk	Giorgio Tesi Group Pistoia	17.7

== Playoffs ==
The Serie A playoffs quarterfinals are best-of-five, while the semifinals and finals series are best-of-seven.

As of 13 June 2016.

Quarterfinals
1	EA7 Emporio Armani Milano	3
8	Dolomiti Energia Trento	0
4	Vanoli Cremona	1
5	Umana Reyer Venezia	3
3	Sidigas Avellino	3
6	Giorgio Tesi Group Pistoia	0
2	Grissin Bon Reggio Emilia	3
7	Banco di Sardegna Sassari	0

Semifinals
1	EA7 Emporio Armani Milano	4
5	Umana Reyer Venezia	2
3	Sidigas Avellino	3
2	Grissin Bon Reggio Emilia	4

Finals
1	EA7 Emporio Armani Milano	4
2	Grissin Bon Reggio Emilia	2

== Serie A clubs in European competitions ==
Team	Competition	Progress
Banco di Sardegna Sassari	Eurocup	Round of 32
EA7 Emporio Armani Milano	EuroLeague	Quarterfinals
Dolomiti Energia Trento	Eurocup	Semifinals
Grissin Bon Reggio Emilia	Eurocup	Round of 32
Umana Reyer Venezia	Eurocup	Round of 32
Enel Brindisi	Eurocup	Regular Season
Acqua Vitasnella Cantù	FIBA Europe Cup	Round of 32
Openjobmetis Varese	FIBA Europe Cup	Final

== Supercup ==
The 2015 Italian Supercup was the 21st edition of the super cup tournament in Italian basketball. It opened the season on 26 and 27 September 2015. Qualified for the tournament were league winners and cup winners Banco di Sardegna Sassari, cup finalists EA7 Emporio Armani Milano and league finalist Grissin Bon Reggio Emilia and Umana Reyer Venezia. These four teams competed for the title in Turin's PalaRuffini. Grissin Bon Reggio Emilia went on to win its first Supercoppa ever beating EA7 Emporio Armani Milano.

== All Star Game ==
The league's All Star Game was contested on 10 January 2016 at PalaTrento in the city of Trento. The two teams were Dolomiti Energia Team and Cavit Team, for sponsorship reasons. The Cavit Team's head coach was the American Dan Peterson. The event was organized in a match between the two All Star teams, the three-point contest and the slam dunk contest. All teams' players had been voted by the Serie A supporters. Cavit Team won the game 154–148. Alex Kirk was named MVP of the 2016 Serie A All Star Game.

== Cup ==
The 48th edition of the Italian Cup, knows as the Beko Final Eight for sponsorship reasons, was contested between 19 and 21 February 2016 in Milan at the Mediolanum Forum. Eight teams qualified for the Final Eight were the best ranked teams at the end of the first stage of the 2015–16 Serie A. EA7 Emporio Armani Milano won their 5th Italian Cup since over 20 years.

== Awards ==
As of 04 May 2016.

=== Most Valuable Player ===
Pos.	Name	Team	Votes
SF	(United States) James Nunnally	Sidigas Avellino	90
PF	(Italy) Davide Pascolo	Dolomiti Energia Trento	41
SG	(Croatia) Krunoslav Simon	EA7 Emporio Armani Milano	38

=== Best Player Under 22 ===
Pos.	Name	Team	Votes
SG	(Italy) Diego Flaccadori	Dolomiti Energia Trento	187
SF	(Italy) Simone Fontecchio	Obiettivo Lavoro Bologna	83
PG	(Italy) Tommaso Laquintana	Betaland Capo d'Orlando	75

=== Best Coach ===
Pos.	Name	Team	Votes
1.	(Italy) Cesare Pancotto	Vanoli Cremona	146
2.	(Italy) Stefano Sacripanti	Sidigas Avellino	134
3.	(Italy) Maurizio Buscaglia	Dolomiti Energia Trento	49

=== Best Executive ===
Pos.	Name	Team	Votes
1.	(Italy) Nicola Alberani	Sidigas Avellino	122
2.	(Italy) Andrea Conti	Vanoli Cremona	84
3.	(Italy) Salvatore Trainotti	Dolomiti Energia Trento	65

=== Finals MVP ===
Pos.	Player	Team
G/F	(United States) Rakim Sanders	EA7 Emporio Armani Milano
