= Esteban Batista =

Uruguayan basketball player (born 1983)

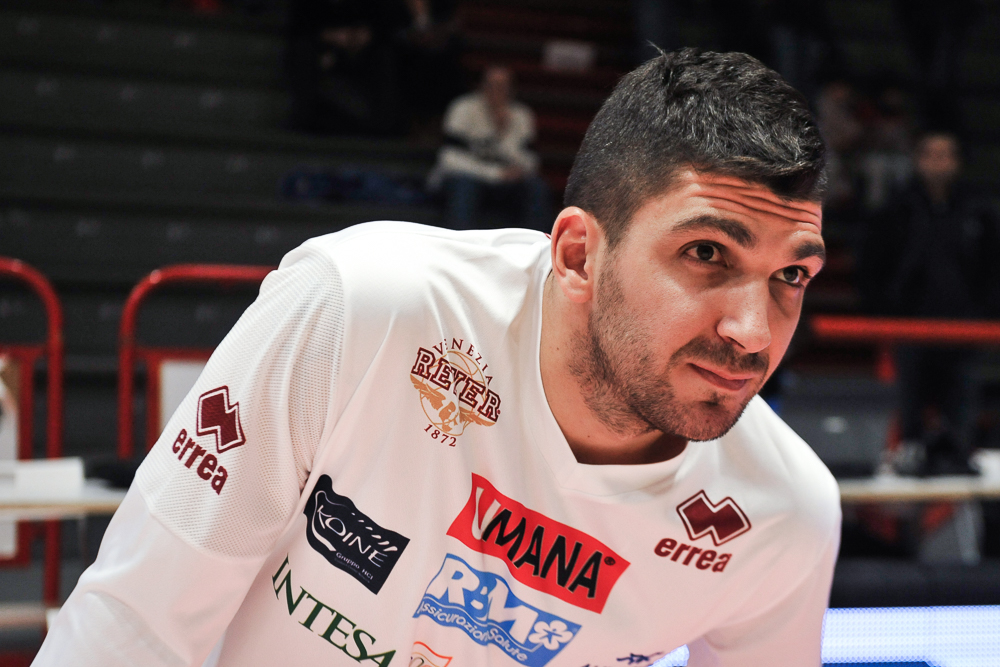
- Batista with Venezia in 2017

Personal information
- Born: September 2, 1983 (age 43) Montevideo, Uruguay
- Listed height: 6 ft 10 in (2.08 m)
- Listed weight: 270 lb (122 kg)

Career information
- NBA draft: 2005: undrafted
- Playing career: 2001–2023
- Position: Center

Career history
- 2001–2003: Club Atlético Welcome
- 2003–2004: Salto Uruguay
- 2004: Pozuelo de Alarcón
- 2004: Club Nacional de Football
- 2004–2005: Trouville
- 2005: Aguas de Calpe
- 2005–2007: Atlanta Hawks
- 2007–2008: Maccabi Tel Aviv
- 2008: Triumph Lyubertsy
- 2009: Libertad
- 2009–2011: Fuenlabrada
- 2011: Caja Laboral
- 2011–2013: Anadolu Efes
- 2013–2014: Pınar Karşıyaka
- 2014–2015: Panathinaikos
- 2015–2016: Beikong Fly Dragons
- 2016: Emporio Armani Milano
- 2016–2017: Beikong Fly Dragons
- 2017: Reyer Venezia
- 2017-2018: Club Atlético Welcome
- 2018-2019: Club Nacional de Football
- 2019: Instituto ACC
- 2019–2020: San Lorenzo de Almagro
- 2020–2022: Hebraica Macabi
- 2022: Cordón
- 2022–2023: Club Atlético Olimpia

Career highlights
- 2× Italian League champion (2016, 2017); Italian Cup winner (2016); Greek Cup winner (2015); Turkish Cup winner (2014)
- Stats at NBA.com
- Stats at Basketball Reference
Medals
Men's basketball
Representing Uruguay
Pan American Games
| Bronze medal – third place | 2007 Rio de Janeiro |
FIBA South American Championship
| Silver medal – second place | 2006 Caracas |
| Silver medal – second place | 2008 Puerto Montt |
| Bronze medal – third place | 2003 Montevideo |
| Bronze medal – third place | 2010 Neiva |

Esteban Damián Batista Hernández (born September 2, 1983) is a Uruguayan former professional basketball player. He was the first ever Uruguayan to play in the NBA.

== Professional career ==
Batista began his pro career in the Uruguayan League in 2001. He then moved to the second division of Spain, the Spanish LEB League in 2003.

=== NBA ===
Batista was signed as a free agent by the Atlanta Hawks on September 12, 2005. He made his NBA debut on November 2 of that year, going scoreless in 6 minutes of play time against the Golden State Warriors. In his first NBA season, Batista averaged 1.8 points per game and 2.5 rebounds per game in 8.7 minutes per game, in 57 games played.

On September 26, 2007, Batista signed a non-guaranteed contract with the Boston Celtics. On October 16, 2007, however, Batista was waived by the team.

=== Europe and China ===
On the same day that he was released by the Celtics, he signed with the EuroLeague team Maccabi Tel Aviv.

Batista joined the Russian Super League team Triumph Lyubertsy in December 2008, but left the club shortly thereafter for personal reasons.

Batista signed a three-year contract with Alta Gestión Fuenlabrada at the summer of 2009. In January 2011, he signed with the Euroleague team Caja Laboral.

In July 2011, he signed a two-year contract with Anadolu Efes of the Turkish Basketball League. In August 2013, he signed a one-year contract with Pınar Karşıyaka also of the Turkish Basketball League.

On July 18, 2014, he signed with Panathinaikos for the 2014–15 season. On April 5, 2015, he won the Greek Cup.

In June 2015, he signed with Beikong Fly Dragons of the Chinese Basketball Association. On February 6, 2016, after the end of the Chinese season, he signed a deal with Emporio Armani Milano until June 2017. However, at the end of the 2015–16 season, he parted ways with Milano.

In July 2016, Batista re-signed with Beikong Fly Dragons for the 2016–17 CBA season. On February 19, 2017, he signed with Italian club Reyer Venezia Mestre for the rest of the 2016–17 Serie A season.

=== Return to Uruguay ===
In August 2017, Batista returned to Uruguay and signed with Club Atlético Welcome.

== Career statistics ==
Legend
| GP | Games played | GS | Games started | MPG | Minutes per game |
| FG% | Field-goal percentage | 3P% | 3-point field-goal percentage | FT% | Free-throw percentage |
| RPG | Rebounds per game | APG | Assists per game | SPG | Steals per game |
| BPG | Blocks per game | PPG | Points per game | PIR | Performance index rating |
| **Bold** | Career high |

=== Regular season ===
| Year | Team | GP | GS | MPG | FG% | 3P% | FT% | RPG | APG | SPG | BPG | PPG |
|---|---|---|---|---|---|---|---|---|---|---|---|---|
| 2005–06 | Atlanta | **57** | **3** | **8.7** | .425 | .000 | **.623** | **2.5** | .1 | **.3** | **.2** | **1.8** |
| 2006–07 | Atlanta | 13 | 0 | 6.2 | **.500** | .000 | .571 | 2.3 | **.3** | .2 | .0 | 1.5 |
| Career | | 70 | 3 | 8.2 | .438 | .000 | .617 | 2.5 | .2 | .3 | .2 | 1.7 |

=== EuroLeague ===
| Year | Team | GP | GS | MPG | FG% | 3P% | FT% | RPG | APG | SPG | BPG | PPG | PIR |
|---|---|---|---|---|---|---|---|---|---|---|---|---|---|
| 2007–08 | Maccabi Tel Aviv | 24 | 5 | 17.8 | .573 | **.1000** | .638 | 5.3 | .9 | **1.1** | **.3** | **10.3** | **11.8** |
| 2008–09 | Maccabi Tel Aviv | 5 | 0 | 9.0 | .500 | .000 | **.800** | 2.6 | .2 | .0 | .2 | 3.6 | 4.2 |
| 2010–11 | Caja Laboral | 10 | 3 | 19.7 | .533 | .000 | .714 | **6.3** | 1.4 | .5 | **.3** | 8.4 | 9.8 |
| 2011–12 | Anadolu Efes | 16 | 5 | 15.8 | .507 | .000 | .550 | 4.3 | .6 | .6 | .2 | 5.1 | 5.9 |
| 2012–13 | Anadolu Efes | 4 | 0 | 11.3 | **.583** | .000 | .600 | 4.3 | **1.8** | .3 | **.3** | 4.3 | 3.3 |
| 2014–15 | Panathinaikos | **26** | **25** | **21.9** | **.583** | .000 | .764 | 5.5 | 1.0 | 1.0 | **.3** | 10.2 | **11.8** |
| Career | | 85 | 38 | 18 | .562 | .500 | .682 | 4.9 | .8 | .8 | .3 | 8.4 | 9.6 |

=== Domestic leagues ===
| Season | Team | League | GP | MPG | FG% | 3P% | FT% | RPG | APG | SPG | BPG | PPG |
|---|---|---|---|---|---|---|---|---|---|---|---|---|
| 2001–02 | Club Atlético Welcome | Campeonato Federal | 23 | ? | ? | ? | ? | ? | ? | ? | ? | 2.3 |
| 2002–03 | Club Atlético Welcome | Campeonato Federal | 22 | ? | ? | ? | ? | 4.5 | ? | ? | ? | 6.2 |
| 2003 | Salto Uruguay | LUB | 28 | ? | ? | ? | ? | ? | ? | ? | ? | 16.4 |
| 2003–04 | Baloncesto Pozuelo | LEB Plata | 23 | 23.7 | .517 | -- | .462 | 7.5 | .3 | .8 | 1.0 | 8.9 |
| 2004 | Nacional | Torneo Metropolitano | ? | ? | ? | ? | ? | ? | ? | ? | ? | 21.6 |
| 2004–05 | Trouville | LUB | 40 | ? | ? | ? | ? | 15.0 | ? | ? | ? | 20.1 |
| 2004–05 | Aguas de Calpe | LEB Oro | 8 | 24.0 | .550 | .000 | .655 | 5.5 | 1.0 | 1.0 | .3 | 10.6 |
| 2007–08 | Maccabi Tel Aviv | Ligat HaAl | 26 | 14.9 | .630 | .000 | .680 | 5.0 | .8 | .6 | .2 | 8.9 |
| 2008–09 | Maccabi Tel Aviv | Ligat HaAl | 3 | 3.0 | .500 | -- | -- | .7 | .0 | .0 | .0 | .7 |
| 2008–09 | Club Libertad | Argentina LNB | 23 | 28.9 | .592 | .100 | .733 | 9.6 | 1.1 | 1.3 | .7 | 15.0 |
| 2009–10 | Baloncesto Fuenlabrada | Liga ACB | 31 | 28.2 | .531 | .667 | .698 | 8.4 | 1.0 | 1.2 | 1.1 | 14.1 |
| 2010–11 | Baloncesto Fuenlabrada | Liga ACB | 14 | 26.5 | .548 | .000 | .724 | 8.4 | 1.7 | 1.8 | 1.1 | 12.7 |
| 2010–11 | Laboral Kutxa | Liga ACB | 25 | 19.7 | .554 | -- | .625 | 4.8 | 1.1 | .5 | .7 | 7.0 |
| 2011–12 | Anadolu Efes | BSL | 41 | 17.7 | .663 | -- | .703 | 5.0 | .7 | .7 | .6 | 7.6 |
| 2012–13 | Anadolu Efes | BSL | 3 | 8.7 | .400 | -- | .500 | 3.7 | .3 | .0 | .7 | 3.3 |
| 2013–14 | Pınar Karşıyaka | BSL | 35 | 27.0 | .620 | .000 | .685 | 8.9 | 1.4 | 1.1 | .7 | 15.9 |
| 2014–15 | Panathinaikos | GBL | 25 | 20.9 | .668 | .000 | .673 | 6.9 | 1.1 | 1.0 | .2 | 12.8 |
| 2014–15 | Beikong Fly Dragons | CBA | 37 | 38.0 | .607 | .143 | .688 | 12.6 | 3.0 | 1.9 | .9 | 25.7 |

== National team career ==
During his career, Batista was a member of the Uruguayan national basketball team. During the 2007 FIBA Americas Championship, which was held from August 22 through September 2, in Las Vegas, Batista averaged 20.8 points per game and 12.4 rebounds per game.

On 26 February 2023, Batista played his last game for Uruguay and retired after a 20-year career of 116 games.
