= Arnold Mitt =

Estonian basketball player

No. 23 – Rossella Virtus Civitanova
- Position: Center / power forward
- League: Lega Basket Serie B

Personal information
- Born: 2 June 1998 (age 28) Võru, Estonia
- Listed height: 207 cm (6 ft 9 in)
- Listed weight: 102 kg (225 lb)

Career information
- Playing career: 2013–present

Career history
- 2013–present: Rossella Virtus Civitanova

Arnold Mitt (born 2 June 1998) is an Estonian professional basketball player who currently Plays with Rossella Virtus Civitanova in lega basket B
