= Sandro Dell'Agnello =

Italian basketball player and coach

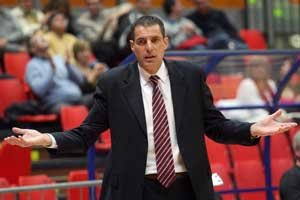
- Sandro Dell'Agnello as a coach in 2008.

Personal information
- Born: 20 October 1961 (age 65) Livorno, Italy
- Listed height: 203 cm (6 ft 8 in)
- Listed weight: 97 kg (214 lb)

Career information
- Playing career: 1981–2003
- Position: Power forward
- Coaching career: 2002–present

Career history

Playing
- 1981-1984: Pielle Livorno
- 1984-1992: Juvecaserta
- 1992-1994: Virtus Roma
- 1994–1996: VL Pesaro
- 1996-1998: Mens Sana Siena
- 1998: Roseto
- 1998-2000: Mens Sana Siena
- 2000-2002: Reggiana

Coaching
- 2002: Reggiana
- 2006–2009: Basket Livorno
- 2009–2010: Reyer Venezia
- 2010–2012: Brescia
- 2012–2013: Forlì
- 2013–2015: VL Pesaro
- 2015–2017: Juvecaserta
- 2017: Brindisi
- 2018-2019: Bergamo
- 2019-2022: Forlì
- 2022-2023: Sebastiani Rieti
- 2023-present: Rimini

Career highlights
- As player: Italian League champion (1991); Italian Cup winner (1988); As head coach: Italian League Coach of the Year (2008)
Medals
Representing Italy
Men's Basketball
EuroBasket
Silver medal – second place	1991 Italy	Italy

Sandro Dell'Agnello (born 20 October 1961 in Livorno) is a former professional basketball player, and current basketball coach from Italy, who won the silver medal with his national team at the Eurobasket 1991 in Italy. Standing at a height of 2,03 m (6 ft. 8 in.), he played as a power forward.

== Playing career ==
Sandro Dell'Agnello began his basketball player career relatively late. He was hired in the local team of Pallacanestro Livorno where he had the opportunity to highlight his physical and athletic skills. In a friendly match against a selection of American All Stars, Dell'Agnello made a block to the famous Houston Rockets center, Moses Malone. This athletic movement, made in a period when the gap between European and American basketball was huge, gave him fame. In 1985, repeating the exploit stopping Michael Jordan too.

In his long career as a power forward player, he played with Pallacanestro Livorno, Phonola Caserta, Virtus Roma, Scavolini Pesaro, Mens Sana Siena, Cordivari Roseto, and finally with Bipop Carire Reggio Emilia.

He won the Italian League in the 1990–91 season, with Phonola Caserta, writing in the final series against arch-rivals Olimpia Milano the best pages of his career, being crucial in the last two games won by Caserta (respectively with 29 and 30 points scored).

Sandro Dell'Agnello retired in 2003 at the age 42.

Up to now, he appears to be the 5th player of all time to have played the most minutes in the Italian league with 18483 minutes in 662 total appearances (19th all-time) and 7557 points scored (26th). He is the 13th rebounder of all time with 3146 rebounds and 13th shot blocker with 426 blocks, reflecting his considerable athletic skills.

With the Italy national team he won the silver medal at the Eurobasket 1991 in Italy. He also took part in the Eurobasket 1989, at the FIBA Basketball World Cup in 1986 and 1990, and the 1990 Goodwill Games.

== Coaching career ==
In Livorno he began his coaching career. He was called in the final season in Serie A by TDShop.it Livorno, but he couldn't achieve the salvation, already partially compromised. It is confirmed the following year in LegaDue. The beginning of the season is not easy. The club was penalized by 4 points (later reduced to two) and it was built on a small budget. But Dell'Agnello, with the great return of Tommaso Fantoni and the Latvian player Troy Ostler in the roster, allows them to save and also to touch the playoffs. The Italian coach is confirmed in Livorno also for the 2008–09 season.

In 2009 he went to Reyer Venezia for one season, and later to Basket Brescia Leonessa and Fulgor Libertas Forlì.

Since June 2013 Dell'Agnello was the new head-coach of Consutlinvest Pesaro, but on 13 January 2015 he was sacked.

On 23 June 2015 he became the new head-coach of Pasta Reggia Caserta.

On 1 July 2017 Sandro Dell'Agnello became new head-coach of New Basket Brindisi, but on 11 December that year he was sacked by the club.
