= Pietro Aradori =

Italian basketball player (born 1988)

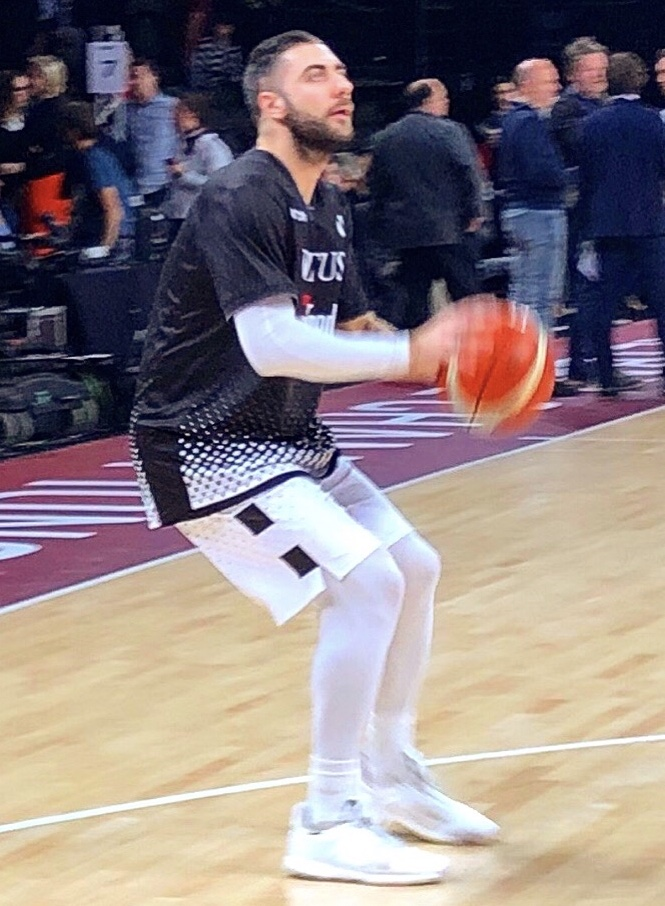
- Aradori with Virtus Bologna in 2019

No. 21 – Pallacanestro Forlì 2.015
- Position: Shooting guard / small forward
- League: Serie A2

Personal information
- Born: 9 December 1988 (age 37) Brescia, Italy
- Listed height: 1.96 m (6 ft 5 in)
- Listed weight: 100 kg (220 lb)

Career information
- NBA draft: 2010: undrafted
- Playing career: 2005–present

Career history
- 2005–2006: Casalpusterlengo
- 2006–2007: Andrea Costa Imola
- 2007–2008: Olimpia Milano
- 2008: Virtus Roma
- 2008–2010: Biella
- 2010–2012: Montepaschi Siena
- 2012–2014: Cantù
- 2014: Galatasaray
- 2014–2015: Estudiantes
- 2015: Reyer Venezia
- 2015–2017: Reggiana
- 2017–2019: Virtus Bologna
- 2019–2025: Fortitudo Bologna
- 2025–present: Forlì

Career highlights
- FIBA Champions League champion (2019); 2× Serie A champion (2011, 2012); 2× Italian Cup winner (2011, 2012); 4× Italian Supercup winner (2011–2013, 2015); Serie A Best Player Under 22 (2010)
Medals
Men's basketball
Representing Italy
European U-20 Championship
Bronze medal – third place	2007 Italy

Pietro Aradori (born 9 December 1988) is an Italian professional basketball player for Forlì of the Serie A2. Standing at 1.96 m (6 ft 5 in), he plays at the shooting guard and small forward positions.

== Professional career ==
The Brescia native played for the youth side of U.C. Casalpusterlengo from 2003, he was a teammate of Danilo Gallinari there. He debuted in the third division during the 2005–06 season. The next year he joined Andrea Costa Imola, of the second division. He averaged 12.8 points (team-best), 3.1 rebounds and 2.2 steals in 30 games for a side fighting relegation.

In June 2007, Aradori signed a three-year contract with Armani Jeans Milano. He made his Serie A (first division) debut that season, also playing in Europe's best competition, the EuroLeague. Though he played regularly for the side, he did not manage to establish himself and finished the season with Lottomatica Roma, who he reached the 2008 Serie A finals with.

Aradori then moved to Pallacanestro Biella, he also struggled with form there before a March performance against Montegranaro, contributing 23 points on 7-for-8 three-point shooting, restored his confidence. He then became one of the main protagonists of Biella's Serie A semifinals run, their best ever finish. For his part in that success, he was awarded the Premio Reverberi (in Italian), an award given by a number of organisation, as the Best Italian player of 2008–09. The next year, he had an excellent season in both the European second tier Eurocup and the league. In the latter, he posted 16.8 points (3rd best in Serie A), 5 rebounds and 2.1 steals, earning the Best Player Under 22 award.

A move to league champions Montepaschi Siena followed in July 2010. In a team that won every domestic trophy (Serie A, Cup, Supercup) whilst also reaching the 2011 Euroleague Final Four Aradori took time to find his place, playing limited minutes. The situation was repeating itself the next year (with Aradori a subsistute as Siena again won the Supercup and Cup) but an injury to starter Rimantas Kaukėnas gave him more playing time. Aradori grabbed his chance, with good performances against Barcelona (11 points in the last six minutes to earn a win) and even more so against Asseco Prokom (23 points - missing only 2 shots - 7 rebounds, 3 steals for 1 turnover, all career bests, for a performance index rating of 33), the second earning him Euroleague Week 10 MVP honours.

Despite this, he remained a substitute at Siena, moving to rival Serie A side Pallacanestro Cantù in July 2012 on a two-year deal. There he became a starter, helping Cantù progress from the qualifying rounds to the 2012–13 Euroleague group stage where he averaged 15 points, 4 rebounds and 1.5 steals in 30 minutes for a PIR of 15.4. In 2013–14, Aradori contributed 13.8 points, 4.5 rebounds and 2.9 assists in the Eurocup, including a Week 1 MVP's 28 points and 6 rebounds against Artland Dragons, as Cantù reached the last 32.

At the expiry of his contract, amidst offers from Italian sides, Aradori moved to the Turkish Basketball League with Galatasaray Liv Hospital, declaredly in order to play at a more competitive level (in both the league and the Euroleague). The Italian averaged 7 points, 2.9 rebounds and 2 assists in around 21 minutes in the Euroleague, with personal (and game) highs of 20 points, 8 rebounds and 6 assists against Valencia in November, in the league he had 6.4 points, 3.3 rebounds and 1.9 assists in 20 minutes.

However, unhappy with his playing time and above all salary arrears, Aradori left Galatasaray in December, signing with Spanish side Estudiantes. He posted averages of 13.1 points, 3.1 rebounds and 2 assists in the competitive Liga ACB, becoming a fan-favourite at Estudiantes. In May 2015, with the side assured of safety, he returned to Italy with Reyer Venezia Mestre in order to play in the 2015 Serie A playoffs.

On 16 July 2015 Aradori signed a two-year contract with Grissin Bon Reggio Emilia.

On 14 July 2017 Aradori signed with Virtus Bologna for the 2017–18 season.

== International career ==
Aradori played for the under-age Italy squads, first with the Under-16's before playing in the 2006 FIBA Europe Under-18 Championship where he posted 22.1 points, 6 rebounds, 1.4 assists and 1 steal per game.

With the Under-18's, he won a bronze medal at the 2007 European Championship, contributing 11 points in the third place game. He also participated in the 2008 edition.

After playing in the 2009 Mediterranean Games with the Italy B squad, scoring 29 points in the semifinal and 21 in the bronze medal game (both defeats), he was called up with the senior Italian national team that was preparing for FIBA EuroBasket 2009 qualification, though he did not play.

He stayed in the national fold from then on, he had a marginal participation in FIBA EuroBasket 2011 qualification but was cut from the squad for the tournament proper due to Italy's overabundance of players in his position.

Aradori became a regular for Italy in 2012, contributing 12.4 points and 2.5 rebounds in around 22 minutes per game as the side qualified for EuroBasket 2013. He was in good form at the tournament, averaging 11.9 points, 3.9 rebounds and 1.8 assists per game.

He was called up to the squad that would take part in EuroBasket 2015 to start on 5 September.

== Honours and titles ==
=== Individual ===
- Serie A Best Player Under 22: 2010
- Premio Reverberi (Oscar del basket) Best Player: 2009

=== Team ===
- Serie A champion (2): 2011, 2012
- Italian Cup winner (2): 2011, 2012
- Italian Supercup winner (4): 2011, 2012, 2013, 2015
- Basketball Champions League: 2018–19

=== Youth ===
- European U20 Championship: 2007 Italy/Slovenia Bronze

== Career statistics ==
Legend
GP	Games played	GS	Games started	MPG	Minutes per game
FG%	Field-goal percentage	3P%	3-point field-goal percentage	FT%	Free-throw percentage
RPG	Rebounds per game	APG	Assists per game	SPG	Steals per game
BPG	Blocks per game	PPG	Points per game	PIR	Performance index rating
**Bold**	Career high

=== Euroleague ===
Year	Team	GP	GS	MPG	FG%	3P%	FT%	RPG	APG	SPG	BPG	PPG	PIR
2007–08	AJ Milano	11	3	13.7	.366	.077	**.833**	1.4	.5	.4	.0	3.3	1.1
2010–11	Montepaschi Siena	14	1	10.8	.435	.500	.760	1.6	.7	.4	.0	4.9	5.1
2011–12	Montepaschi Siena	**17**	1	10.4	.455	.313	.813	2.0	.6	.1	**.1**	4.8	5.5
2012–13	Mapooro Cantù	8	**7**	**30.0**	**.513**	**.565**	.781	**4.0**	1.5	.1	.0	**15.0**	**15.4**
2014–15	Galatasaray	8	3	21.2	.472	.400	.800	2.9	**2.0**	**.8**	.0	7.0	10.5
Career		58	15	15.3	.457	.400	.791	2.2	.9	0.3	.0	6.2	6.6
