= James Nunnally =

American basketball player (born 1990)

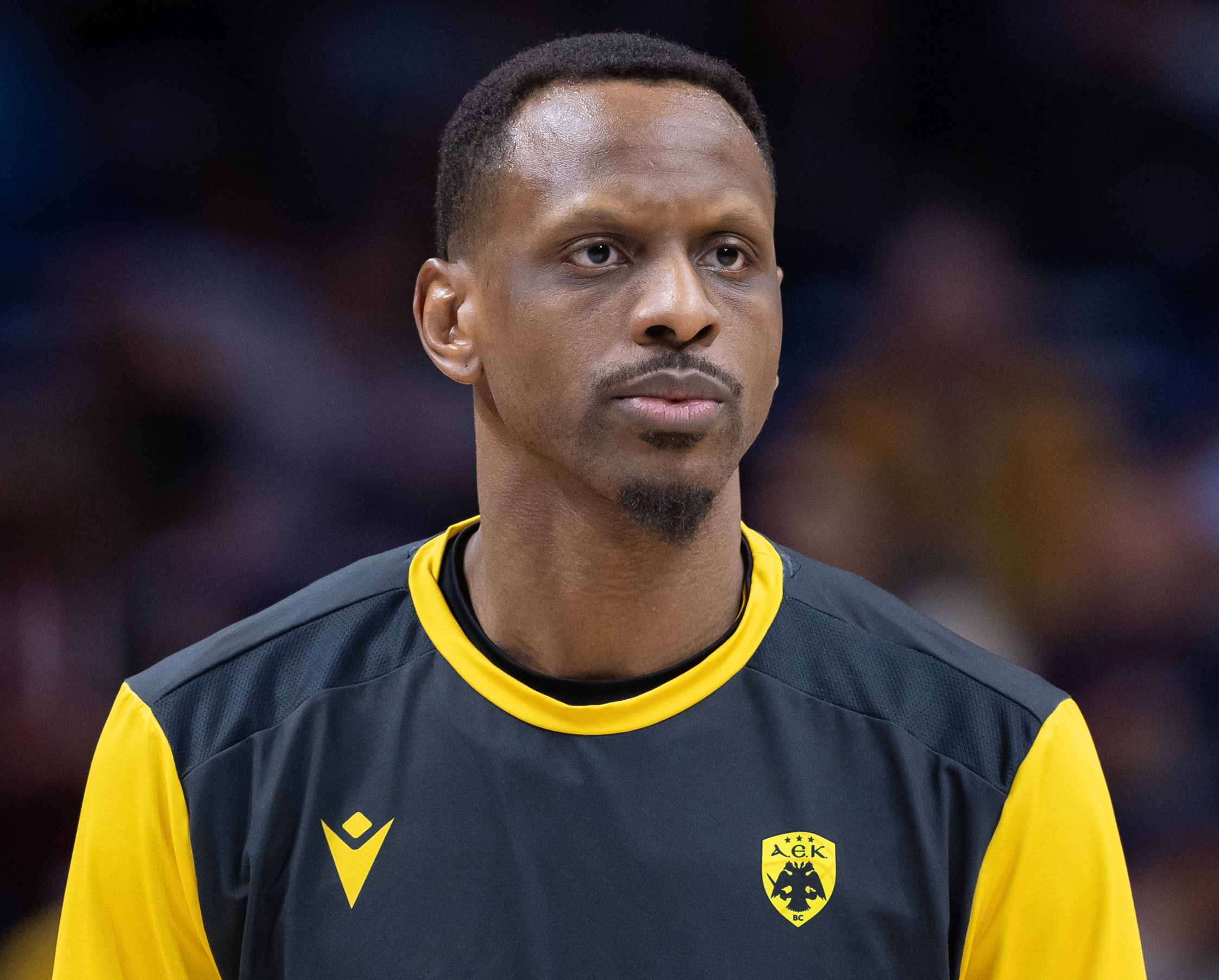
- Nunnally with AEK B.C. in 2026

Free agent
- Position: Small forward

Personal information
- Born: July 14, 1990 (age 36) San Jose, California, U.S.
- Listed height: 6 ft 7 in (2.01 m)
- Listed weight: 211 lb (96 kg)

Career information
- High school: Weston Ranch (Stockton, California)
- College: UC Santa Barbara (2008–2012)
- NBA draft: 2012: undrafted
- Playing career: 2012–present

Career history
- 2012: Kavala
- 2012–2014: Bakersfield Jam
- 2014: Atlanta Hawks
- 2014: Bakersfield Jam
- 2014: Texas Legends
- 2014: Philadelphia 76ers
- 2014: Cangrejeros de Santurce
- 2014: Estudiantes
- 2014–2015: Maccabi Ashdod
- 2015–2016: Felice Scandone
- 2016–2018: Fenerbahçe
- 2018–2019: Minnesota Timberwolves
- 2019: Houston Rockets
- 2019: Olimpia Milano
- 2019: Shanghai Sharks
- 2020: Fenerbahçe
- 2021: New Orleans Pelicans
- 2021–2022: Maccabi Tel Aviv
- 2022–2024: Partizan
- 2025: Zhejiang Lions
- 2026: AEK Athens

Career highlights
- EuroLeague champion (2017); 2× Turkish League champion (2017, 2018); Turkish Cup winner (2020); 2× Turkish Super Cup winner (2016, 2017); Italian League MVP (2016); ABA League champion (2023); Israeli League Cup winner (2021); Israeli League Cup MVP (2021); CBA champion (2025); All-NBA D-League Second Team (2014); NBA D-League All-Star (2014); NBA D-League All-Rookie Third Team (2013); 2× Second-team All-Big West (2010, 2012)
- Stats at NBA.com
- Stats at Basketball Reference

James William Nunnally (born July 14, 1990) is an American professional basketball player who most recently played for AEK Athens of the Greek Basketball League (GBL). He played college basketball for the UC Santa Barbara Gauchos.

== Early life and education ==
Nunnally was born in San Jose, California, and attended Weston Ranch High School in Stockton, California. As a sophomore, he averaged 10 points and 8.4 rebounds per game. As a junior, he averaged 19 points, 6.5 rebounds and 3.5 assists per game as he was named Stockton Record Player of the Year, All-State, All-CIF Sac-Joaquin Section and All-Valley Oak League.

In November 2007, Nunnally signed a National Letter of Intent to play college basketball at the University of California, Santa Barbara.

As a senior, he averaged 22.1 points, 8.3 rebounds, 3.4 assists, 1.9 steals, and 1.2 blocks per game as he helped Weston Ranch to a perfect 14–0 record in the Valley Oak League. He was named All-State, Valley Oak League Most Valuable Player, All-CIF Sac-Joaquin Section, first-team All-Valley Oak League, and Stockton Record Player of the Year. He was a McDonald's All-American nominee.

In his freshman season at UC Santa Barbara, Nunnally was one of four Gauchos to play in all 31 games, starting seven midway through the season. In those 31 games, he averaged 7.9 points, 3.3 rebounds and 1.5 assists per game.

In his sophomore season, he was a second-team All-Big West choice and a Big West All-Tournament team selection. In 29 games, he averaged 14.7 points, 5.6 rebounds and 1.9 assists in 29.9 minutes per game.

In his junior season, he was an Honorable Mention All-Big West choice and was selected to the All-Big West Tournament team after helping the Gauchos to their second straight title. In 32 games, he averaged 16.3 points, 5.7 rebounds and 1.8 assists in 33.0 minutes per game.

In his senior season, he was a second-team All-Big West choice for the second time in his career. He was also named to the All-Big West Tournament team for the third straight year. In 31 games, he averaged 16.0 points, 5.9 rebounds and 2.8 assists in 33.7 minutes per game.

== Career ==
=== 2012–13 season ===
After failing to be drafted in the 2012 NBA draft, Nunnally joined the Sacramento Kings for the 2012 NBA Summer League. On August 19, 2012, he signed a one-year deal with Kavala of Greece's Basket League. In October 2012, he left Kavala, after just three games.

On November 2, 2012, he was selected in the second round of the 2012 NBA D-League draft, by the Bakersfield Jam.

=== 2013–14 season ===
In July 2013, Nunnally joined the Miami Heat for the 2013 NBA Summer League. On September 28, 2013, he signed with the Phoenix Suns. However, he was later waived by the Suns on October 24, 2013.

In November 2013, he was re-acquired by the Bakersfield Jam. On January 11, 2014, he signed a 10-day contract with the Atlanta Hawks. On January 22, 2014, he signed a second 10-day contract with the Hawks. On February 1, 2014, the Hawks did not offer him a rest of season contract after his second 10-day contract expired and returned to the Bakersfield Jam. On February 13, 2014, he was named to the Prospects All-Star team for the 2014 NBA D-League All-Star Game, as a replacement for Chris Johnson.

On February 20, 2014, he was traded to the Texas Legends. On March 17, 2014, he signed a 10-day contract with the Philadelphia 76ers. On March 27, 2014, he signed a second 10-day contract with the 76ers. On April 6, 2014, the 76ers did not offer him a contract for the remainder of the season after his second 10-day contract expired.

On May 6, 2014, he signed with Cangrejeros de Santurce of Puerto Rico for the rest of the 2014 BSN season. On May 26, 2014, he was waived by Cangrejeros after just six games.

=== 2014–15 season ===
In July 2014, Nunnally joined the Indiana Pacers for the Orlando Summer League and the Miami Heat for the Las Vegas Summer League. On September 17, 2014, he signed with Tuenti Móvil Estudiantes of Spain for the 2014–15 season. In November 2014, he left Estudiantes after appearing in seven games. On December 1, 2014, he signed with Maccabi Ashdod of Israel for the rest of the season.

=== 2015–16 season ===
In July 2015, Nunnally re-joined the Indiana Pacers for the 2015 NBA Summer League. On August 22, 2015, he signed with Sidigas Avellino of Italy for the 2015–16 season. He led the club to a 26–14 record and averaged 18.4 points (third highest scorer in the competition), 4.2 rebounds, and 2.5 assists while shooting 90.8% from the free throw line (tops in the league) over those 40 games. He subsequently earned Italian league MVP honors.

=== Fenerbahçe (2016–2018) ===
In July 2016, Nunnally joined the Philadelphia 76ers for the Utah Summer League and the Washington Wizards for the Las Vegas Summer League. On July 28, 2016, Nunnally signed with Fenerbahçe of Turkey for the 2016–17 season.

In the 2017–18 EuroLeague season, Fenerbahçe made it to the 2018 EuroLeague Final Four, its fourth consecutive Final Four appearance. Eventually, they lost to Real Madrid, by a score of 85–80, in the EuroLeague Final. Over 29 EuroLeague games, he averaged 9.3 points, 2.1 rebounds and 1.3 assists per game, while shooting above 54% overall from the field, and 55.4% on three-point shot attempts.

=== 2018–2019 season ===
On August 8, 2018, Nunnally signed a two-year deal with the Minnesota Timberwolves. On January 7, 2019, he was waived by the Timberwolves after appearing in only 13 games.

On January 16, 2019, Nunnally signed a 10-day contract with the Houston Rockets. Nunnally was waived on January 21 to make room for Kenneth Faried.

On January 27, 2019, Nunnally signed a one-and-a-half-year contract with the AX Armani Exchange Olimpia Milan, of the Italian Serie A and EuroLeague. On August 12, 2019, Nunnally left the club on a mutual agreement.

=== Shanghai Sharks / Return to Fenerbahçe (2019–2020) ===
On August 12, 2019, Nunnally signed with Shanghai Sharks of the Chinese Basketball Association. On December 3, he was replaced by Ray McCallum Jr. He averaged 22.3 points, 5.5 rebounds, 3.3 assists and 1.2 steals per game.

On January 3, 2020, Nunnally returned to Fenerbahçe.

=== New Orleans Pelicans (2021) ===
On April 12, 2021, Nunnally signed a two-way contract with the New Orleans Pelicans.

=== Maccabi Tel Aviv (2021–2022) ===
On June 27, 2021, Nunnally signed a two (1+1) year contract with Maccabi Tel Aviv of the Israeli Premier League and the EuroLeague.

=== Partizan (2022–2024) ===
In the summer of 2022, Nunnally signed a contract with the Serbian team Partizan. During the 2022–23 season, Partizan was eliminated from the Real Madrid in a tight playoffs series. Over the season, Nunnally averaged 9.2 points and 2.1 rebounds per game. Partizan ended the 2022–23 season by lifting the ABA League championship trophy, after a 3–2 score against Crvena Zvezda in the Finals series.

Over the 2023–24 season, he averaged 12.3 points, 3.2 rebounds and 2.6 assists over 32 EuroLeague games. The season was deemed unsuccessful for Partizan as they finished the season without lifting any trophy.

=== Zhejiang Lions (2025) ===
In January 2025, Nunnally signed with Zhejiang Lions of the Chinese Basketball Association.

=== AEK Athens (2026) ===
On January 1, 2026, Nunnally joined AEK Athens of the Greek Basketball League (GBL) and the FIBA Champions League.

== Personal life ==
Nunnally is the son of Deanna Johnson. Married to wife, Jen, the two recently celebrated their marriage with a vow renewal. They have two daughters and a son.

== Career statistics ==
Legend
GP	Games played	GS	Games started	MPG	Minutes per game
FG%	Field-goal percentage	3P%	3-point field-goal percentage	FT%	Free-throw percentage
RPG	Rebounds per game	APG	Assists per game	SPG	Steals per game
BPG	Blocks per game	PPG	Points per game	PIR	Performance index rating
**Bold**	Career high

=== NBA ===
Year	Team	GP	GS	MPG	FG%	3P%	FT%	RPG	APG	SPG	BPG	PPG
2013–14	Atlanta	4	0	13.5	.333	.300	.750	**2.0**	.5	.3	**.3**	**4.5**
2013–14	Philadelphia	9	0	12.3	.321	.333	.600	1.2	.7	**.6**	.1	2.9
2018–19	Minnesota	**13**	0	4.9	**.429**	**.385**	**1.000**	.3	.4	.1	—	2.1
2018–19	Houston	2	0	**19.0**	.231	.250	—	.5	**1.0**	—	—	**4.5**
2020–21	New Orleans	9	0	5.3	.385	.333	.500	1.0	.3	—	—	1.7
Career		37	0	8.5	.344	.323	.733	.9	.5	.2	.1	2.6

=== EuroLeague ===
†	Denotes seasons in which Nunnally won the EuroLeague

Year	Team	GP	GS	MPG	FG%	3P%	FT%	RPG	APG	SPG	BPG	PPG	PIR
2016–17†	Fenerbahçe	34	11	17.9	.440	.451	.870	2.0	1.7	.4	.2	5.6	5.1
2017–18	Fenerbahçe	29	18	20.6	**.540**	**.554**	.897	2.1	1.3	**.7**	.2	9.3	8.8
2018–19	Olimpia Milano	10	7	26.9	.484	.421	.917	2.9	2.2	.4	.0	**14.1**	14.5
2019–20	Fenerbahçe	9	1	13.2	.458	.417	**1.000**	1.4	.7	.2	.1	4.2	4.1
2021–22	Maccabi Tel Aviv	32	17	**28.3**	.456	.407	.898	**3.9**	**2.6**	.6	**.4**	13.8	**15.1**
2022–23	Partizan	**37**	**19**	22.4	.492	.405	.885	2.1	1.8	.5	.2	9.2	8.8
2023–24	Partizan	32	13	27.8	.524	.433	.870	3.2	**2.6**	.6	.1	12.3	13.0
Career		183	86	23.1	.489	.439	.893	2.6	1.9	.5	.2	9.9	10.0

=== Domestic leagues ===
Year	Team	League	GP	MPG	FG%	3P%	FT%	RPG	APG	SPG	BPG	PPG
2012–13	(Greece) Kavala	GBL	2	28.8	.353	.400	.800	6.5	1.5	.5	—	9.0
2012–13	(Greece) Kavala	BIBL	1	22.0	.556	1.000	—	3.0	1.0	—	—	11.0
2012–13	(United States) Bakersfield Jam	D-League	49	19.7	.430	.406	.884	3.0	1.8	.8	.2	10.3
2013–14	(United States) Bakersfield Jam	D-League	25	33.6	.457	.429	.848	4.6	4.1	.9	.1	18.4
2013–14	(United States) Texas Legends	D-League	10	33.7	.492	.367	.781	4.2	2.2	1.1	.3	17.3
2013–14	(Puerto Rico) C. de Santurce	BSN	6	31.4	.451	.412	.875	3.8	2.5	1.3	.2	18.2
2014–15	(Spain) Estudiantes	ACB	7	19.8	.472	.318	.750	2.3	1.3	.7	.1	9.4
2014–15	(Israel) Maccabi Ashdod	Ligat HaAl	24	34.6	.426	.381	.800	7.7	3.1	1.2	.4	17.1
2015–16	(Italy) Felice Scandone	LBA	40	31.7	.476	.412	.908	4.2	2.4	.7	.1	18.3
2016–17	(Turkey) Fenerbahçe	TBSL	30	21.2	.574	.571	.862	1.6	2.0	.8	.1	11.9
2017–18	(Turkey) Fenerbahçe	TBSL	27	23.0	.521	.488	.885	2.3	2.3	.9	.1	11.3
2018–19	(Italy) Olimpia Milano	LBA	19	27.8	.469	.440	.960	2.3	2.9	.6	—	14.7
2019–20	(China) Shanghai Sharks	CBA	12	32.5	.489	.500	.846	5.5	3.3	1.2	.1	22.3
2019–20	(Turkey) Fenerbahçe	TBSL	5	28.2	.480	.519	.818	2.2	1.8	.6	—	14.2
2021–22	(Israel) Maccabi Tel Aviv	Ligat HaAl	22	25.9	.381	.315	.942	3.3	2.5	.6	.1	10.5
2022–23	(Serbia) Partizan	ABA	36	20.0	.522	.511	.875	2.0	1.7	.5	.1	9.7
2023–24	(Serbia) Partizan	ABA	31	22.0	.493	.419	.932	2.8	3.0	.5	.1	10.2

=== College ===
Year	Team	GP	GS	MPG	FG%	3P%	FT%	RPG	APG	SPG	BPG	PPG
2008–09	UC Santa Barbara	31	6	21.0	.464	.361	.770	3.3	1.5	.5	.2	7.9
2009–10	UC Santa Barbara	29	24	29.9	.455	**.455**	.743	5.6	1.9	**.7**	.1	14.7
2010–11	UC Santa Barbara	**32**	**31**	33.0	.466	.369	**.827**	5.7	1.8	.4	**.3**	**16.3**
2011–12	UC Santa Barbara	31	**31**	**33.7**	**.470**	.370	.796	**5.9**	**2.8**	**.7**	**.3**	16.0
Career		123	93	29.4	.465	.386	.784	5.1	2.0	.6	.2	13.7
