= Ronald Moore (basketball) =

American basketball player (born 1988)

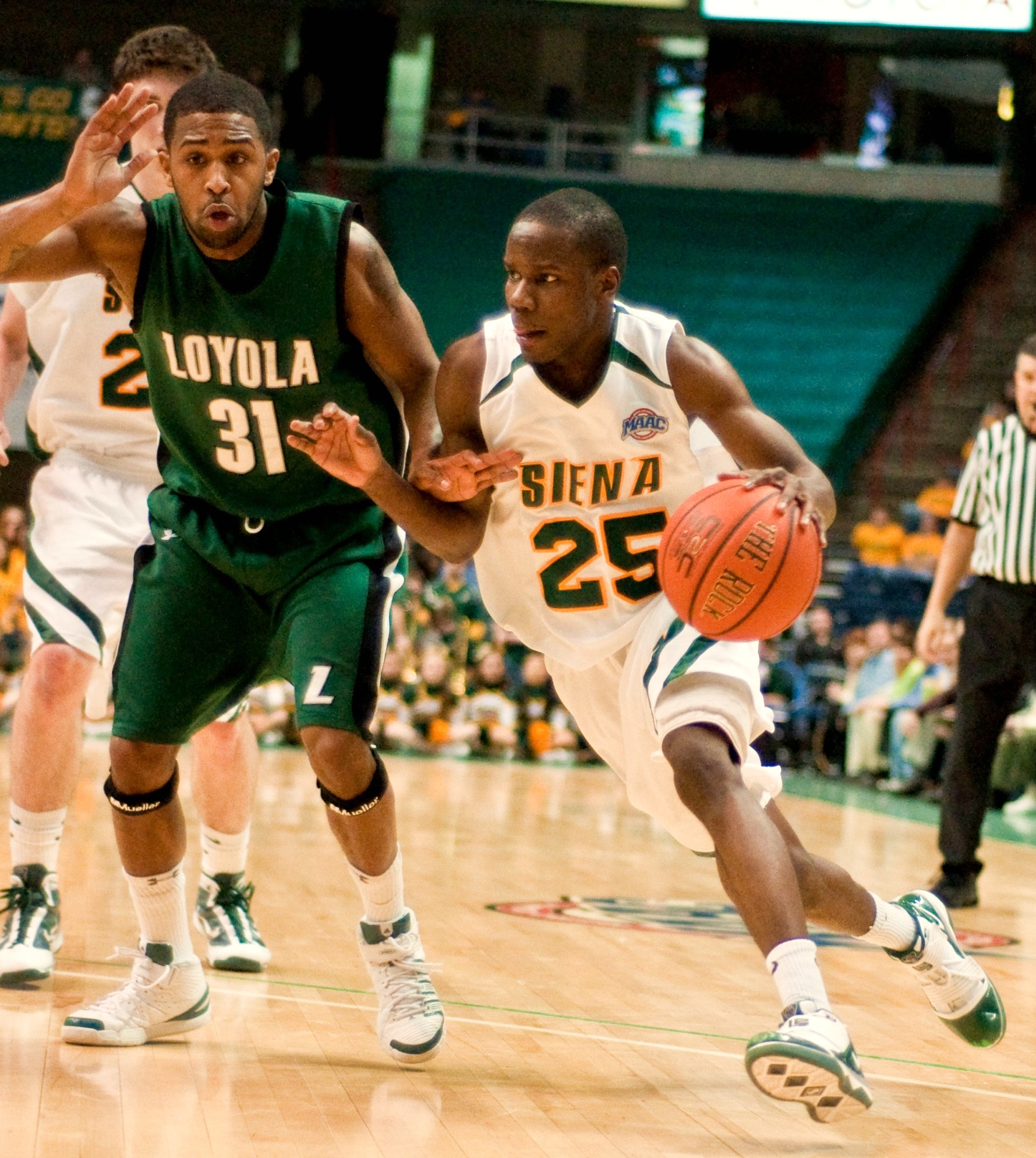
- Moore with Siena in 2010

Penn Quakers
- Title: Assistant coach
- Conference: Ivy League

Personal information
- Born: July 14, 1988 (age 38) Philadelphia, Pennsylvania, U.S.
- Listed height: 183 cm (6 ft 0 in)
- Listed weight: 75 kg (165 lb)

Career information
- High school: Plymouth-Whitemarsh (Plymouth Meeting, Pennsylvania)
- College: Siena (2006–2010)
- NBA draft: 2010: undrafted
- Playing career: 2010–2021
- Position: Point guard
- Coaching career: 2025–present

Career history

Playing
- 2010–2011: SPU Nitra
- 2011–2012: Turów Zgorzelec
- 2012–2013: Alba Fehérvár
- 2013–2014: Cherkaski Mavpy
- 2014–2015: Juvecaserta
- 2015–2018: Pistoia 2000
- 2018–2019: Pallacanestro Varese
- 2019–2020: Élan Béarnais
- 2020: Cibona
- 2020–2021: Debreceni EAC

Coaching
- 2025–present: Penn (assistant)

Career highlights
- NCAA assists leader (2010); First-team All-MAAC (2010); Second-team All-MAAC (2009)

Ronald Moore (born July 14, 1988) is an American basketball coach and former player, currently an assistant coach for the Penn Quakers of the Ivy League. Whilst playing collegiately for Siena, he led the NCAA Division I in assists during his senior season (2009–10).

== High school career ==
Moore attended Plymouth-Whitemarsh High School in Plymouth Meeting, Pennsylvania. In his senior season, Moore averaged 17 points, 8 assists, and 2 steals, which earned him an All-Southern Pennsylvania Third Team selection by The Philadelphia Inquirer.

His height, culminating at 6 ft 0 in (1.83 m), and his weight, less than 160 lb (73 kg), reportedly deterred major colleges from recruiting him, with offers solely from mid-majors. In December 2005, his Plymouth Whitemarsh coach contacted Siena – an NCAA Division I college in the Metro Atlantic Athletic Conference (MAAC) - head coach Fran McCaffery to talk up Moore. McCaffery, who thought Moore was already recruited, came down to watch him play (with Moore collecting 15 assists in that game) and sent him a scholarship offer soon after.

== College career ==
Moore debuted against Stanford on 11 November 2006, posting 10 points, 3 assists, and 3 steals off the bench. He started 27 games over his freshman season, leading the Saints in minutes (31.2 minutes) and assists (4.9, third-best in the MAAC), adding 7.4 points and 3.5 rebounds per game.

He posted a MAAC-third best 5.3 assists per game in his sophomore season, adding 4.1 rebounds and 1.5 steals in nearly 32 minutes per game. Moore contributed 11 points, 6 rebounds and 6 assists in the NCAA tournament upset of Vanderbilt.

He led the MAAC in assists for his junior year, with 6.4 per game (twelfth best nationally) on his way to Second Team All-MAAC and All-MAAC Tournament Team selections. Two three-pointers in the NCAA tournament game against Ohio State, the first to tie the game in the first overtime and the second to win the game with 3.9 seconds left in the second overtime, allowed Siena to progress to the Second Round. During Moore's second three-pointer, CBS Sports basketball analyst Bill Raftery made his memorable call of "ONIONS! Double order!" Moore proceeded to have "one of the best 1-for-10 shooting performances", posting 10 assists for 2 turnovers as he evaded Louisville's press, though that was not enough to topple the No. 1-seed.

As a senior in 2009–2010, Moore was a First-team All-MAAC selection. He had 9 points and 6 assists against Fairfield in the MAAC tournament final to help Siena win the tournament for the third consecutive year. Moore led the entire NCAA Division I in assists during the season with 261 assists (7.7 per game), he finished his career with an MAAC record 823 that also ranked 23rd all-time best in the Division I.

== Professional career ==
Going undrafted in the 2010 NBA draft, Moore signed his first professional contract for Slovak Extraliga side Edymax SPU Nitra over the summer, averaging 17 points and 7 assists during the 2010–11 season.

The next season saw Moore move to PGE Turów Zgorzelec of the Polish Basketball League. He had 7.2 points and 4.4 assists a little more than 22 minutes per game in the Polish league, complemented by 9.8 points and 5.2 assists in nearly 26 minutes in Europe's second-tier Eurocup.

In September 2012, the American moved to Alba Fehérvár of the Hungarian NB I/A, helping the side win the league and cup with 11.5 points, 6.3 assists, 3.8 rebounds and 2.3 steals per game. On 2 July 2013, he signed with Ukrainian Basketball SuperLeague outfit Cherkaski Mavpy. However, he left the team in February 2014 due to the unrest in the country. He joined Italian Serie A side Pasta Reggia Caserta on 25 February 2014 to finish the season.

During the summer, his contract was renewed for the 2014–15 season.

On 10 August 2015, Moore signed with fellow Serie A side Giorgio Tesi Group Pistoia.

On June 26, 2018, Moore left Pistoia after 3 years and signed a deal with Pallacanestro Varese.

On July 30, 2019, he has signed with Élan Béarnais of the French LNB Pro A. He averaged 9.5 points, 3 rebounds and 4.7 assists per game. On August 2, 2020, Moore has signed for Cibona of the ABA League.

In December, 2020, he moved to Debreceni EAC of the Hungarian Basketball League.

== Post-playing career ==
After retiring in 2021, Moore ran a youth basketball training business. In 2025, he joined the staff of his old coach, Fran McCaffrey, at Penn.

== Personal ==
Three members of Moore's family have also been involved in the sport at a high level. His uncle, Jimmie Baker, played in the ABA. His older brother, Chuck Moore, played college basketball for Vanderbilt and his cousin, Moore's cousin, John Salmons, played in the NBA.

== See also ==
- List of NCAA Division I men's basketball season assists leaders
