= Andrea De Nicolao =

Italian professional basketball player

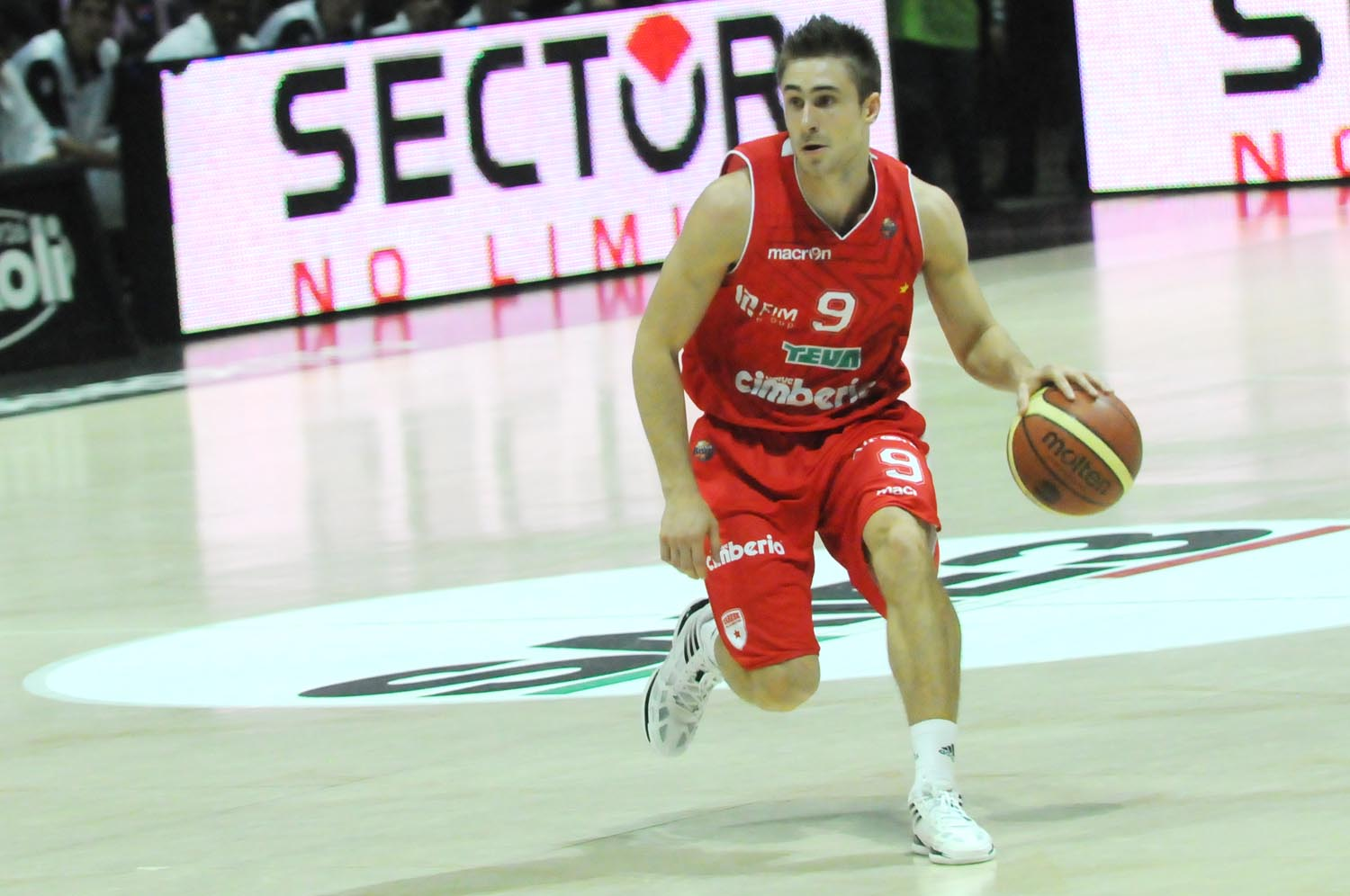
- De Nicolao playing for Varese in 2013

No. 9 – Victoria Libertas Pesaro
- Position: Point guard
- League: Serie A2

Personal information
- Born: 21 August 1991 (age 35) Camposampiero, Italy
- Listed height: 1.85 m (6 ft 1 in)
- Listed weight: 75 kg (165 lb)

Career information
- NBA draft: 2013: undrafted
- Playing career: 2009–present

Career history
- 2009–2012: Treviso
- 2010–2011: →Lago Maggiore
- 2012–2014: Varese
- 2014–2015: Scaligera Verona
- 2015–2017: Reggiana
- 2017–2024: Reyer Venezia
- 2024–2026: Cantù
- 2026–present: Victoria Libertas Pesaro

Career highlights
- FIBA Europe Cup champion (2018); Italian Supercup winner (2015); Serie A2 Cup winner (2015); 3× Serie A All-Star (2012–14)
Medals
Men's basketball
Representing Italy
FIBA Europe Under-20 Championship
Silver medal – second place	2011 Spain	National Team

Andrea De Nicolao (born 21 August 1991) is an Italian professional basketball player for Victoria Libertas Pesaro of the Italian Serie A2.

== Professional career ==
De Nicolao progressed through the youth ranks of Pallacanestro Vigodarzere (with stints at Virtus Padova and Petrarca Padova), a team coached by his father. Moving to Benetton Treviso in 2008, he won the under-19 national title with the side at the end of his first season. He made his debut in the Serie A on 12 October 2009, playing a little less than seven minutes per game over the rest of the season. The youngster was then loaned to lower league side Lago Maggiore the next season, returning in 2011. His second season with Treviso saw him collect 16.5 minutes of playing time per game, for 3.5 points and 1.1 assist. De Nicolao moved to fellow Serie A side Cimberio Varese in 2012, gradually increasing his minutes and statistical output over the next two seasons, he was nominated for the Serie A best player under 22 award for 2012–13, finishing third. After a season in the second division Serie A2 with Tezenis Verona, posting 10.3 points and a league-best 6.4 assists per game, De Nicolao joined Grissin Bon Reggio Emilia in 2015.

In May 2018, De Nicolao won the FIBA Europe Cup championship with Reyer Venezia. He re-signed with Reyer Venezia for two seasons with a third year option on June 18, 2020.

On June 26, 2024, he signed with Pallacanestro Cantù.

== International career ==
De Nicolao played with Italian representative sides in each age group from the Under-16's to the Under-18's through to the Under-20's. With the latter, he earned a silver medal at the 2011 European Championship, posting 11 points and 9 boards in the final.

He made his fully fledged debut for the senior national team in July 2014.
