= Bruno Cerella =

Italian-Argentine basketball player

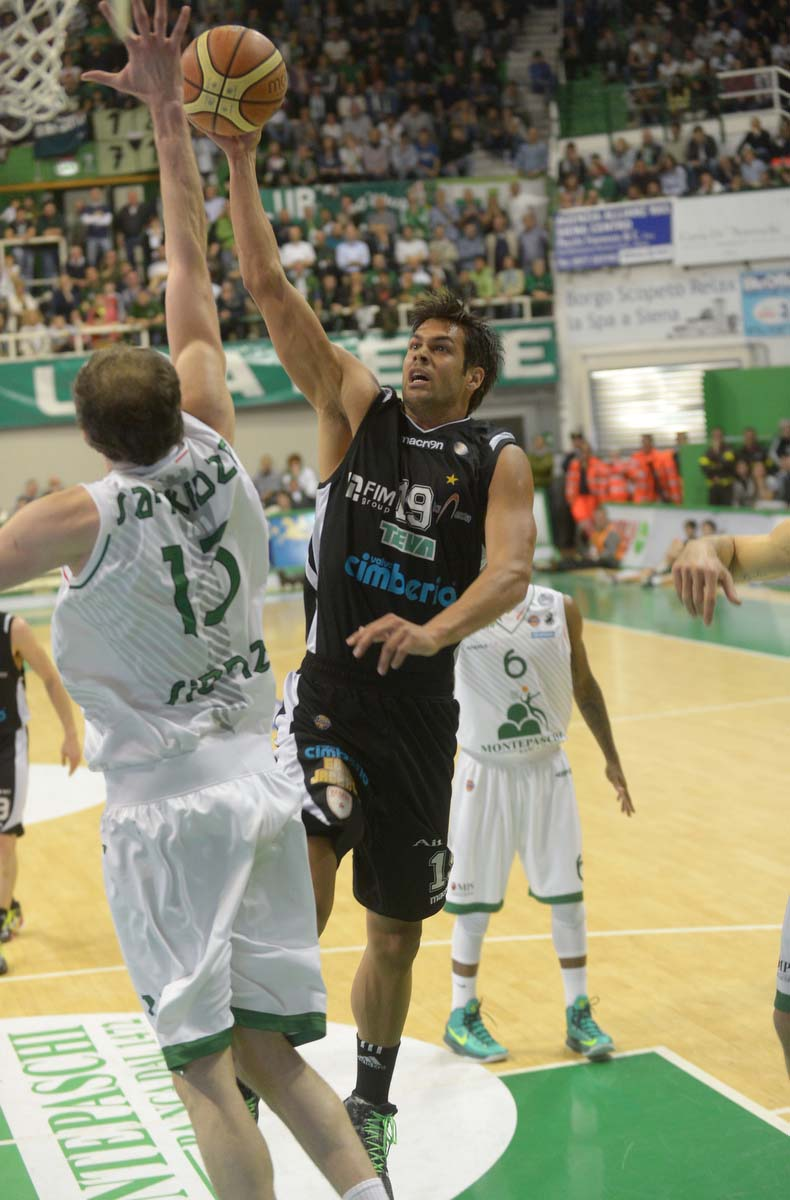
- Cerella with Varese in 2013

Blu Basket 1971
- Position: Shooting guard / small forward
- League: Serie A2

Personal information
- Born: July 30, 1986 (age 40) Bahía Blanca, Argentina
- Listed height: 1.94 m (6 ft 4 in)
- Listed weight: 93 kg (205 lb)

Career information
- NBA draft: 2008: undrafted
- Playing career: 2004–present

Career history
- 2004–2005: Massafra
- 2005–2006: Senise
- 2006–2007: Salerno
- 2007–2008: Potenza
- 2008–2012: Teramo
- 2010–2011: →Casalpusterlengo
- 2012–2013: Varese
- 2013–2018: Olimpia Milano
- 2017–2018: → Reyer Venezia
- 2018–2022: Reyer Venezia
- 2022–present: Blu Basket 1971

Career highlights
- FIBA Europe Cup champion (2018); LBA champion (2014); Italian Cup winner (2016)

Bruno Cerella (born July 30 1986) is an Italian-Argentine professional basketball player for Blu Basket 1971 of the Italian Serie A2.

He comes from Bahía Blanca, a city seeped in basketball tradition, where players such as Manu Ginóbili were born and raised. Having come to Italy as a teenager, he slowly established himself and moved up the league levels to join Emporio Armani Milano, where he became a fan favourite, due to his dynamism and dedication to the team. In August 2017, Cerella was sent on loan to Reyer Venezia of the LBA.

== Early life ==
Cerella was born on July 30 1986, in Bahia Blanca, a city in Argentina. His father Claudio Fernando Cerella is of Italian descent and his mother Claudia Viviana Val is of French and Spanish descent. Cerella has four sisters.

== Professional career ==
After playing junior youth basketball for Estudiantes de Bahía Blanca and Pueyrredon in his country of birth Argentina, Cerella moved to Italy at age 17, to play professional basketball. After playing for a succession of teams in the Italian lower level divisions, he joined Banca Tercas Teramo in the Italian first division in 2008.

Along with David Moss, he helped the team reach the semi-finals of the 2009 Italian Cup and to a third-place finish in the Italian League's regular season, before being eliminated in the playoffs by Emporio Armani Milano. After a few LBA seasons, he joined Emporio Armani Milano in 2013 and with them he participated in Europe's premier basketball competition, the EuroLeague, for the first time in his career.

In August 2017, Cerella was sent on loan to Umana Reyer Venezia, the defending Italian champions. While playing for Reyer Venezia in the 2017–18 season, Cerella won the FIBA Europe Cup. He re-signed with Reyer Venezia on June 13 2020.

== National team career ==
Cerella was a member of the senior men's Italian national basketball team in 2008, although he never played in an official competition.

== Player profile ==
Although not always a starter and not a high scorer, Cerrella plays defense and contributes by stealing the ball without many turnovers.

== Personal life ==
Of Italian heritage, through his paternal grandfather, he became an Italian citizen when he was 15.

Together with fellow player Tommaso Marino and others, he created the charity project, “Slums Dunk”, that he operates during the off-season in Kenya and Zambia. It aims to provide basketball coaching, facilities and education to youngsters in underprivileged areas.

In his free time, he enjoys scuba diving and travelling.

One of his good friends is fellow Bahía Blanca native Rodrigo Palacio, who also lives in Milan and is a basketball fan.

In 2024, Cerella began dating Greek actress Athina Oikonomakou. The couple married in a religious wedding on May 16 2026 in Athens, Greece and they exchanged vows on June 27 2026 in Paros, Greece.
