= Rimantas Kaukėnas =

Lithuanian basketball player (born 1977)

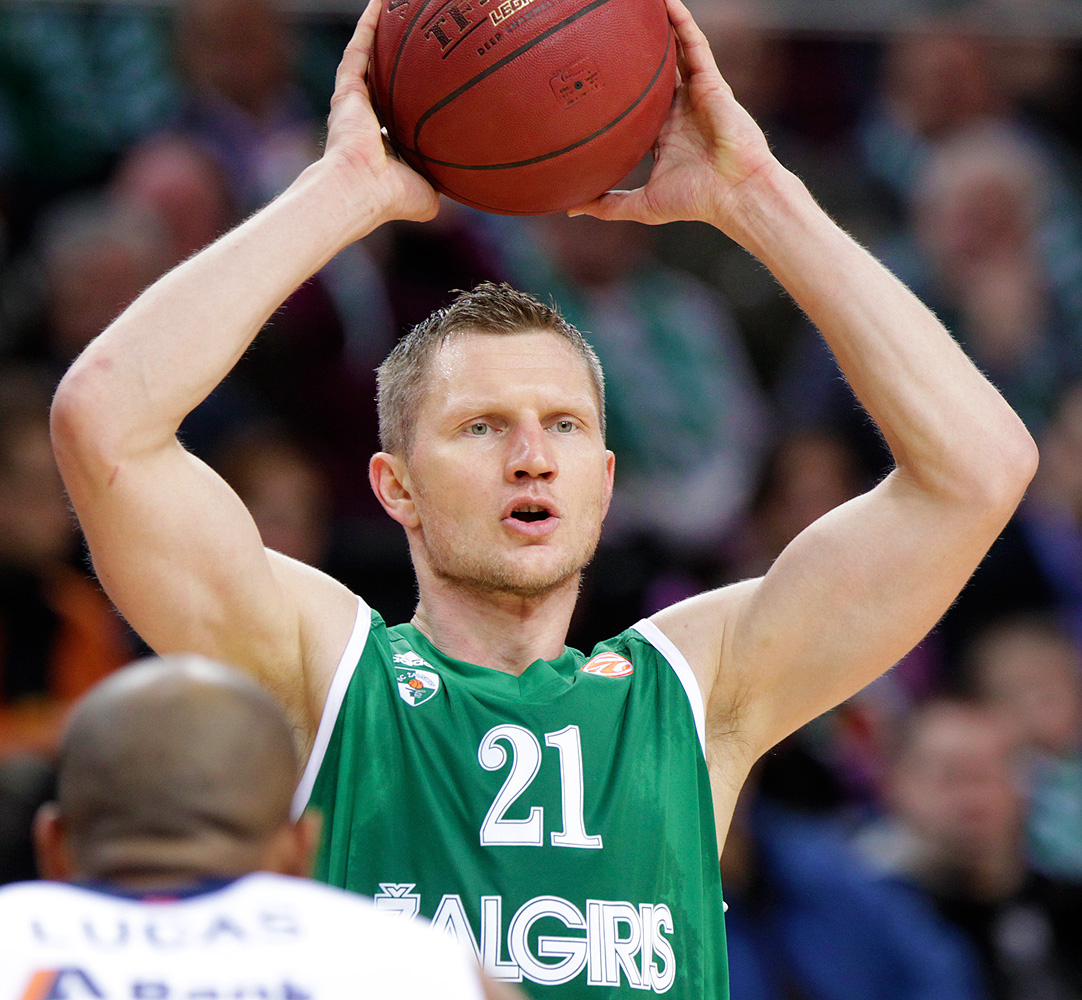
- Kaukėnas in 2013

Personal information
- Born: 11 April 1977 (age 49) Vilnius, Lithuania
- Listed height: 192 cm (6 ft 4 in)
- Listed weight: 92 kg (203 lb)

Career information
- High school: Prattsburgh Central School (Prattsburgh, New York)
- College: Seton Hall (1996–2000)
- NBA draft: 2000: undrafted
- Playing career: 2000–2016, 2017
- Position: Shooting guard

Career history
- 2000–2001: Hapoel Galil Elyon
- 2001–2002: Lietuvos rytas Vilnius
- 2002–2003: Oostende
- 2003–2004: Bonn
- 2004–2005: Cantù
- 2005–2009: Mens Sana Siena
- 2009–2010: Real Madrid
- 2010–2012: Mens Sana Siena
- 2012–2013: Žalgiris Kaunas
- 2013: Baskonia
- 2013–2016: Reggiana
- 2017: Reggiana

Career highlights
- 2× Lithuanian League champion (2002, 2013); 4× Italian League champion (2007–2009, 2011); 5× Italian Supercup winner (2007, 2008, 2010, 2011, 2015); Serie A Finals MVP (2007); BBL All-Star Game MVP (2004); No. 13 retired by Montepaschi Siena (2009)
Medals
Men's basketball
Representing Lithuania
EuroBasket
Bronze medal – third place	2007 Spain	National Team

Rimantas "Rimas" Kaukėnas (born 11 April 1977) is a Lithuanian professional basketball executive and former player who was the president of Wolves Twinsbet of the Lithuanian Basketball League (LKL) and the EuroCup. His long career has taken him to a number of countries, finding the most success in Italy. He has also been a member of the senior men's Lithuanian national team. Playing primarily at the shooting guard position, he could also play as a point guard.

== Professional career ==
Kaukėnas was a longtime member of Montepaschi Siena of the Italian Serie A.

On 5 August 2012 he signed for his homeland team Žalgiris Kaunas.

He joined Grissin Bon Reggio Emilia in December 2013, helping the side reach the finals of the 2014–15 Lega Basket Serie A. In July 2015, his contract was extended for another season. On 7 July 2016 Kaukėnas retired from professional basketball. On 7 January 2017 Kaukėnas came out of retirement and rejoined Grissin Bon Reggio Emilia for the rest of the season.

== National team ==
Kaukėnas played with the senior men's Lithuanian national basketball team at the EuroBasket 2001, the EuroBasket 2007, where he won a bronze medal, and the EuroBasket 2011. He also played at both the 2008 Summer Olympics and the 2012 Summer Olympics.

== Personal life ==
Kaukėnas established the Rimantas Kaukenas Charity Group, which aims to provide "magical moments" for children with life-threatening medical conditions. He is married to former Swedish-Serbian basketball player Tanja Kostić, with whom he has three daughters. Tanja follows the activities of RK Charity Group, while Rimantas is playing during the season. He is fluent in English, Italian and Russian.

== EuroLeague career statistics ==
Legend
GP	Games played	GS	Games started	MPG	Minutes per game
FG%	Field-goal percentage	3P%	3-point field-goal percentage	FT%	Free-throw percentage
RPG	Rebounds per game	APG	Assists per game	SPG	Steals per game
BPG	Blocks per game	PPG	Points per game	PIR	Performance index rating
**Bold**	Career high

Year	Team	GP	GS	MPG	FG%	3P%	FT%	RPG	APG	SPG	BPG	PPG	PIR
2005–06	Montepaschi Siena	14	**12**	28.5	.442	.302	.847	1.9	2.0	**1.7**	.0	**15.1**	12.9
2007–08	Montepaschi Siena	9	5	**28.8**	.431	.290	.882	**2.6**	**2.6**	1.6	.1	14.1	13.6
2008–09	Montepaschi Siena	18	5	**28.8**	.518	.368	.847	2.3	1.7	1.1	.0	14.8	12.8
2009–10	Real Madrid	18	10	21.4	.545	.353	.829	1.1	1.3	1.6	.0	10.3	8.1
2010–11	Montepaschi Siena	20	11	25.3	.445	.308	.902	2.0	1.9	1.1	.1	12.0	9.6
2011–12	Montepaschi Siena	6	6	25.3	.580	**.643**	**1.000**	2.2	2.5	1.2	.0	14.5	**15.3**
2012–13	Žalgiris Kaunas	**24**	11	20.3	.395	.344	.882	2.1	1.9	.8	.0	7.8	6.4
2013–14	Laboral Kutxa	5	1	12.3	**.583**	.000	**1.000**	1.4	1.0	.6	**.2**	3.6	3.8
Career		114	61	23.8	.510	.337	.874	1.9	1.8	1.0	.0	11.6	10.2

== Awards and achievements ==
=== Playing career ===
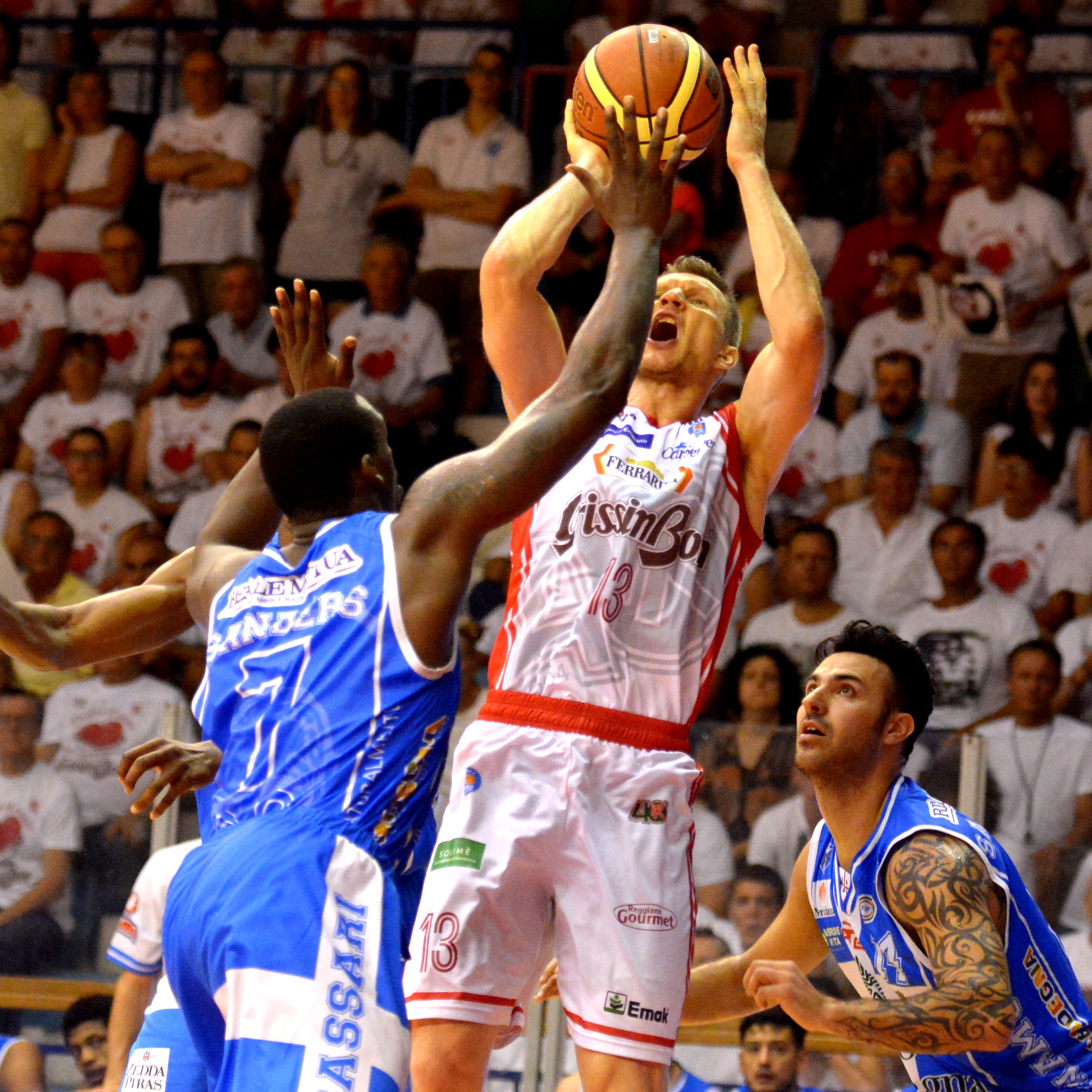
Rimantas Kaukėnas with his career's last professional club Grissin Bon Reggio Emilia in 2015.

- Lithuanian League Champion: 2002
- North European League Champion: 2002
- German League All-Star Game MVP: 2004
- Eurobasket.com's German League Player of the Year: 2004
- Italian League MVP Runner Up: 2005
- 2× Italian SuperCup Winner: 2007, 2008
- Italian League MVP Runner Up: 2007
- 4× Italian League Champion: 2007, 2008, 2009, 2011
- Italian League Finals MVP: 2007
- Italian Supercup: 2007
- EuroBasket 2007: Bronze
- EuroLeague 3rd Place: 2008
- His number 13 was retired by Montepaschi Siena in 2009.

=== State awards ===
- Lithuania: Recipient of the Commander's Cross of the Order for Merits to Lithuania (2007)
