= 2016–17 Olimpia Milano season =

EA7 Emporio Armani Milano
2016–17 season
- Chairman: Livio Proli
- Head coach: Jasmin Repeša
- Arena: Mediolanum Forum
- LBA: Semifinalist
- EuroLeague: 16th
- Italian Cup: Champions
- Italian Supercup: Champions
Home	Away	EuroLeague

The 2016–17 season will be Olimpia Milano's 85th in existence and the club's 84th consecutive season in the top flight of Italian basketball and the 10th consecutive season in the top flight of European basketball. Milan is involved in four competitions.

== Players ==
=== Roster ===
Olimpia Milano roster
Players
Coaches

Pos.	No.	Nat.	Name	Ht.	Wt.	Age
F/C	1	(United States)	McLean, Jamel	2.03 m (6 ft 8 in)	109 kg (240 lb)	37 – 18 April 1988
G/F	2	(Italy)	Fontecchio, Simone	2.03 m (6 ft 8 in)	91 kg (201 lb)	29 – 2 December 1995
G	7	(Georgia (country))	Hickman, Ricky	1.89 m (6 ft 2 in)	88 kg (194 lb)	40 – 1 September 1985
PG	9	(Lithuania)	Kalnietis, Mantas	1.95 m (6 ft 5 in)	93 kg (205 lb)	39 – 6 September 1986
G/F	12	(Slovenia)	Dragić, Zoran (injured)	1.96 m (6 ft 5 in)	91 kg (201 lb)	36 – 22 June 1989
F/C	13	(Serbia)	Mačvan, Milan	2.06 m (6 ft 9 in)	107 kg (236 lb)	35 – 16 November 1989
PF	14	(Italy)	Pascolo, Davide	2.03 m (6 ft 8 in)	91 kg (201 lb)	34 – 14 December 1990
PG	20	(Italy)	Cinciarini, Andrea (C)	1.93 m (6 ft 4 in)	84 kg (185 lb)	39 – 21 June 1986
F	21	(United States)	Sanders, Rakim	1.96 m (6 ft 5 in)	106 kg (234 lb)	36 – 8 July 1989
SF	23	(Italy)	Abass, Awudu	2.00 m (6 ft 7 in)	100 kg (220 lb)	32 – 27 January 1993
G/F	30	(Italy)	Cerella, Bruno	1.94 m (6 ft 4 in)	93 kg (205 lb)	39 – 30 July 1986
C	35	(United States)	Tarczewski, Kaleb	2.11 m (6 ft 11 in)	111 kg (245 lb)	32 – 26 February 1993
G/F	43	(Croatia)	Simon, Krunoslav	1.97 m (6 ft 6 in)	100 kg (220 lb)	40 – 24 June 1985

Head coach

- (Croatia) Jasmin Repeša

Assistant coach(es)

- (Italy) Mario Fioretti
- (Italy) Massimo Cancellieri

Athletic trainer(s)

- (Italy) Giustino Danesi

Legend

- (C) Team captain
- Injured

- Roster

=== Depth chart ===
Pos.	Starting 5	Bench 1	Bench 2	Bench 3
C	Miroslav Raduljica	Milan Mačvan
PF	Jamel McLean	Davide Pascolo
SF	Rakim Sanders	Awudu Abass		Bruno Cerella
SG	Krunoslav Simon	Zoran Dragic		Simone Fontecchio
PG	Ricky Hickman	Mantas Kalnietis	Andrea Cinciarini

=== Players in ===
No.	Pos.	Nat.	Name	Age	Moving from		Type	Ends	Transfer fee	Date	Source
23	SF	(Italy)	Awudu Abass	23	Red October Cantù	(Italy)	Transfer	2017	Undisclosed	12 June 2016	
14	PF	(Italy)	Davide Pascolo	25	Dolomiti Energia Trento	(Italy)	Transfer	2017	Undisclosed	17 June 2016	
2	G/F	(Italy)	Simone Fontecchio	20	Virtus Bologna	(Italy)	Transfer	2017	Undisclosed	7 July 2016	
12	SG	(Slovenia)	Zoran Dragić	27	Khimki	(Russia)	Transfer	2018	Undisclosed	7 July 2016	
11	C	(Serbia)	Miroslav Raduljica	28	Panathinaikos	(Greece)	Transfer	2018	Undisclosed	16 July 2016	
7	G	(Georgia (country))	Ricky Hickman	31	Fenerbahçe	(Turkey)	Transfer	2018	Undisclosed	26 July 2016	

Total spending: ▼€0

=== Players out ===
No.	Pos.	Nat.	Name	Age	Moving to		Type	Transfer fee	Date	Source
51	C	(Uruguay)	Esteban Batista	33	Beikong Fly Dragons	(China)	Contract terminated	Free	4 July 2016	
6	PG	(Italy)	Andrea Amato	27	Vanoli Cremona	(Italy)	Loan	Undisclosed	7 July 2016	
22	G	(Serbia)	Charles Jenkins	27	Crvena zvezda	(Serbia)	Contract terminated	Free	10 July 2016	
27	C	(Croatia)	Stanko Barać	30	Free agent		Contract terminated	Free	10 July 2016	
20	PG	(Croatia)	Oliver Lafayette	32	Unicaja	(Spain)	Contract terminated	Undisclosed	18 July 2016	
18	C	(Italy)	Daniele Magro	29	Giorgio Tesi Group Pistoia	(Italy)	Contract terminated	Undisclosed	27 July 2016	

Total income: ▲€0

Total expenditure: €0

== Club ==
=== Technical staff ===
Position	Staff
Head coach	Jasmin Repeša
Assistant coaches	Mario Fioretti; Massimo Cancellieri
Athletic trainers	Giustino Danesi; Luca Agnello

Source: EA7 Emporio Armani Milano

=== Kit ===
- Supplier: Armani
- Main sponsor: Emporio Armani
- Back sponsor: EA Eyewear
- Short sponsor: Aon

Home	Away	EuroLeague	EuroLeague

== Pre-season and friendlies ==
Win Loss

28 August 2016 1	EA7 Emporio Armani Milano (Italy)	87–73	(Italy) Europromotion Legnano	Bormio, Italy
19:00 (CEST)
		Boxscore		Arena: Pentagono

1 September 2016 2	Fortitudo Bologna (Italy)	61–87	(Italy) EA7 Emporio Armani Milano	Bormio, Italy
19:00 (CEST)
		Boxscore		Arena: Pentagono

4 September 2016 3	EA7 Emporio Armani Milano (Italy)	80–78	(Turkey) Tofaş	Bormio, Italy
20:30 (CEST)
		Boxscore		Arena: Pentagono

7 September 2016 4	EA7 Emporio Armani Milano (Italy)	91–86	(Turkey) Galatasaray Odeabank	Sondrio, Italy
18:30 (CEST)
		Boxscore		Arena: PalaScieghi

10 September 2016 5	Union Olimpija (Slovenia)	68–84	(Italy) EA7 Emporio Armani Milano	Trento, Italy
18:30 (CEST)
		Boxscore		Arena: PalaTrento

11 September 2016 6	Brose Bamberg (Germany)	92–85	(Italy) EA7 Emporio Armani Milano	Trento, Italy
18:30 (CEST)
		Boxscore		Arena: PalaTrento

17 September 2016 7	EA7 Emporio Armani Milano (Italy)	84–82	(Italy) Germani Basket Brescia	Desio, Italy
		Boxscore		Arena: PalaDesio

18 September 2016 8	Vanoli Cremona (Italy)	74–82	(Italy) EA7 Emporio Armani Milano	Desio, Italy
19:00 (CEST)
		Boxscore		Arena: PalaDesio

== Competitions ==
=== Overall ===
Competition	Started round	Current position / round	Final position / round	First match	Last match
LBA	Matchday 1	1st	–	2 October 2016	7 May 2017
EuroLeague	Matchday 1	15th	–	14 October 2016	6 April 2017
Italian Cup	Quarterfinals	—	Winners	17 January 2017	19 January 2017
Italian Supercup	Semifinals	—	Winners	23 September 2016	24 September 2016

Updated to match played March 31, 2017
Source: Competitions

=== Overview ===
Competition	Record							
Competition	Pld	W	D	L	PF	PA	PD	Win %
LBA	24	20	0	4	2,085	1,896	+189	83.33
EuroLeague	28	7	0	21	2,255	2,431	−176	25.00
Italian Cup	3	3	0	0	248	233	+15	100.00
Italian Supercup	2	2	0	0	199	159	+40	100.00
Total	57	32	0	25	4,787	4,719	+68	56.14

Last updated: March 27, 2017
Source: Competitions

=== Italian Supercup ===
Win Loss

24 September 2016 Semifinals	EA7 Emporio Armani Milano	109–87	Vanoli Cremona	Milan
20:45 (CEST)	Scoring by quarter: 29–28, 21–24, 27–9, 32–26
	Pts: Simon 18; Rebs: Pascolo 7 Asts: Kalnietis 6 PIR: Hickman 22	Boxscore	Pts: Turner 18; Rebs: Biligha 5 Asts: Turner, Holloway 3 PIR: Mian 17	Arena: Mediolanum Forum; Referees: Luca Weidmann, Gabriele Bettini, Lorenzo Baldini

25 September 2016 Final	Sidigas Avellino	72–90	EA7 Emporio Armani Milano	Milan
18:15 (CEST)	Scoring by quarter: 19–23, 15–21, 17–23, 21–23
	Pts: Ragland 18; Rebs: Cusin, Obasohan 5 Asts: five players 2 PIR: Obasohan 17	Boxscore	Pts: Simon 25; Rebs: Dragić 7 Asts: Simon 8 PIR: Simon 30	Arena: Mediolanum Forum; Referees: Dino Seghetti, Luca Weidmann, Gabriele Bettini

=== LBA ===
==== League table ====
Pos	Team	Pld	W	L	PF	PA	PD	Qualification or relegation
1	EA7 Emporio Armani Milano	30	23	7	2584	2384	+200	Qualification to playoffs
2	Umana Reyer Venezia	30	21	9	2447	2330	+117	Qualification to playoffs
3	Sidigas Avellino	30	19	11	2392	2285	+107	Qualification to playoffs
4	Dolomiti Energia Trento	30	18	12	2352	2201	+151	Qualification to playoffs
5	Banco di Sardegna Sassari	30	17	13	2301	2218	+83	Qualification to playoffs

Source: LBA

==== Results by round ====
Round	1	2	3	4	5	6	7	8	9	10	11	12	13	14	15	16	17	18	19	20	21	22	23	24	25	26	27	28	29	30
Ground	A	H	H	A	H	A	H	A	H	A	A	H																		
Result	W	W	W	W	W	W	W	W	W	W	L	W																		
Position	4	2	1	1	1	1	1	1	1	1	1	1																		

Last updated: December 18, 2016.
Source: Competitive matches
Ground: A = Away; H = Home; R = Rest. Result: L = Loss; W = Win; R = Rest; P = Postponed.

==== Matches ====
Win Loss

2 October 2016 1	Betaland Capo d'Orlando	65–71	EA7 Emporio Armani Milano	Capo d'Orlando
20:45 (CEST)	Scoring by quarter: 20–11, 21–22, 12–20, 12–18
	Pts: Archie 17; Rebs: Delas, Archie 7 Asts: Fitipaldo, Laquintana 4 PIR: Archie 22	Boxscore	Pts: Simon 17; Rebs: Mačvan 9 Asts: Cinciarini, Simon 4 PIR: Mačvan, Simon 16	Arena: PalaFantozzi; Referees: Massimiliano Filippini, Gianluca Sardella, Evangelista Caiazza

9 October 2016 2	EA7 Emporio Armani Milano	87–81	Sidigas Avellino	Assago, Milan
12:00 (CEST)	Scoring by quarter: 24–21, 16–17, 26–16, 21–27
	Pts: McLean 16; Rebs: Simon 6 Asts: Three players 4 PIR: McLean 22	Boxscore	Pts: Fesenko 22; Rebs: Fesenko 7 Asts: Ragland 6 PIR: Fesenko 31	Arena: Mediolanum Forum; Referees: Saverio Lanzarini, Manuel Mazzoni, Mark Bartoli

16 October 2016 3	EA7 Emporio Armani Milano	79–71	Openjobmetis Varese	Assago, Milan
20:45 (CEST)	Scoring by quarter: 22–16, 22–17, 18–19, 17–19
	Pts: Abass 15; Rebs: Mačvan 9 Asts: Hickman 7 PIR: Mačvan 23	Boxscore	Pts: Avramović 19; Rebs: Anosike 12; Asts: Maynor 6 PIR: Pelle 20	Arena: Mediolanum Forum; Referees: Carmelo Paternicò, Carmelo Lo Guzzo, Dario Morelli

23 October 2016 4	Germani Basket Brescia	80–97	EA7 Emporio Armani Milano	Montichiari, Brescia
12:00 (CEST)	Scoring by quarter: 19–25, 15–25, 31–25, 15–22
	Pts: Moore 26; Rebs: Moore 8 Asts: Moore 6 PIR: Moore 31	Boxscore	Pts: Simon 26; Rebs: Pascolo 9 Asts: Mačvan 4 PIR: Simon 28	Arena: PalaGeorge; Referees: Roberto Begnis, Alessandro Vicino, Beniamino Manuel Attard

30 October 2016 5	EA7 Emporio Armani Milano	100–80	Juvecaserta	Assago, Milan
18:15 (CEST)	Scoring by quarter: 28–12, 27–24, 20–25, 25–19
	Pts: Abass 21; Rebs: three players 6 Asts: three players 5 PIR: Abass 28	Boxscore	Pts: Watt 22; Rebs: Watt, Putney 6 Asts: Sosa 9 PIR: Watt 29	Arena: Mediolanum Forum; Referees: Tolga Sahin, Alessandro Martolini, Gianluca Calbucci

6 November 2016 6	FIAT Torino	97–100	EA7 Emporio Armani Milano	Turin
12:00 (CEST)	Scoring by quarter: 26–30, 25–27, 20–16, 26–27
	Pts: Harvey 25; Rebs: White 8 Asts: Wright 6 PIR: Wilson 20	Boxscore	Pts: Simon 16; Rebs: McLean 6 Asts: Hickman, Cinciarini 4 PIR: Raduljica 18	Arena: PalaRuffini; Referees: Manuel Mazzoni, Luca Weidmann, Valerio Grigioni

13 November 2016 7	EA7 Emporio Armani Milano	86–77	Banco di Sardegna Sassari	Assago, Milan
20:45 (CEST)	Scoring by quarter: 24–20, 18–19, 28–22, 16–16
	Pts: Raduljica 17; Rebs: Simon 7 Asts: Simon 8 PIR: Simon 22	Boxscore	Pts: Johnson-Odom 25; Rebs: Lydeka 7 Asts: Johnson-Odom, Stipčević 4 PIR: Lydeka 22	Arena: Mediolanum Forum; Referees: Roberto Begnis, Alessandro Vicino, Fabrizio Paglialunga

20 November 2016 8	Vanoli Cremona	72–76	EA7 Emporio Armani Milano	Cremona
18:15 (CEST)	Scoring by quarter: 17–24, 21–15, 15–12, 19–25
	Pts: Biligha, Holloway 15; Rebs: Biligha 8 Asts: five players 2 PIR: Biligha 25	Boxscore	Pts: Mačvan 14; Rebs: Simon 8 Asts: Hickman 3 PIR: Pascolo 16	Arena: PalaRadi; Referees: Emanuele Aronne, Michele Rossi, Evangelista Caiazza

27 November 2016 9	EA7 Emporio Armani Milano	104–70	The Flexx Pistoia	Assago, Milan
18:15 (CEST)	Scoring by quarter: 21–18, 31–22, 27–16, 25–14
	Pts: Fontecchio 15; Rebs: Raduljica 11; Asts: Gentile, Kalnietis 8 PIR: Raduljica 29	Boxscore	Pts: Petteway 13; Rebs: Antonutti 7 Asts: Moore 3 PIR: Lombardi 11	Arena: Mediolanum Forum; Referees: Massimiliano Filippini, Lorenzo Baldini, Denny Borgioni

4 December 2016 10	Dolomiti Energia Trento	74–92	EA7 Emporio Armani Milano	Trento
20:45 (CEST)	Scoring by quarter: 16–17, 15–27, 18–23, 25–25
	Pts: Baldi Rossi, Hogue 17; Rebs: Baldi Rossi, Hogue 9 Asts: Flaccadori 3 PIR: Hogue 26	Boxscore	Pts: Simon 19; Rebs: McLean 7 Asts: three players 3 PIR: Simon 23	Arena: PalaTrento; Referees: Enrico Sabetta, Luca Weidmann, Evangelista Caiazza

11 December 2016 11	Umana Reyer Venezia	88–84	EA7 Emporio Armani Milano	Mestre, Venice
12:00 (CEST)	Scoring by quarter: 34–22, 15–19, 23–20, 16–23
	Pts: McGee 20; Rebs: Hagins 7 Asts: Haynes, McGee 3 PIR: McGee 23	Boxscore	Pts: Sanders 15; Rebs: McLean, Dragić 5 Asts: Kalnietis 10; PIR: Kalnietis 20	Arena: Taliercio; Referees: Carmelo Lo Guzzo, Manuel Mazzoni, Fabrizio Paglialunga

18 December 2016 12	EA7 Emporio Armani Milano	99–86	Enel Brindisi	Assago, Milan
18:45 (CEST)	Scoring by quarter: 22–21, 29–27, 20–22, 28–16
	Pts: Simon 19; Rebs: McLean 7 Asts: Kalnietis 6 PIR: Simon 25	Boxscore	Pts: Carter 19; Rebs: M'Baye 6 Asts: M'Baye 5 PIR: Scott 25	Arena: Mediolanum Forum; Referees: Dino Seghetti, Gianluca Sardella, Denis Quarta

27 December 2016 13	Grissin Bon Reggio Emilia	vs.	EA7 Emporio Armani Milano	Bologna
20:45 (CEST)
		Boxscore		Arena: Land Rover Arena

2 January 2017 14	EA7 Emporio Armani Milano	vs.	Consultinvest Pesaro	Assago, Milan
20:30 (CEST)
		Boxscore		Arena: Mediolanum Forum

9 January 2017 15	Red October Cantù	vs.	EA7 Emporio Armani Milano	Desio
20:30 (CEST)
		Boxscore		Arena: PalaBancoDesio

16	vs.

17	vs.

18	vs.

19	vs.

20	vs.

21	vs.

22	vs.

23	vs.

24	vs.

25	vs.

26	vs.

27	vs.

28	vs.

29	vs.

30	vs.

==== Results overview ====
Win Draw Loss

Opposition	Home score	Away score	Double
Banco di Sardegna Sassari	86–77		
Betaland Capo d'Orlando		65–71	
Consultinvest Pesaro			
Dolomiti Energia Trento		74–92	
Enel Brindisi	99–86		
FIAT Torino		97–100	
Germani Basket Brescia		80–97	
Grissin Bon Reggio Emilia			
Juvecaserta	100–80		
Openjobmetis Varese	79–71		
Red October Cantù			
Sidigas Avellino	87–81		
The Flexx Pistoia	104–70		
Umana Reyer Venezia		88–84	
Vanoli Cremona		72–76	

=== EuroLeague ===
==== League table ====
Pos	Team	Pld	W	L	PF	PA	PD
12	(Turkey) Galatasaray Odeabank	30	11	19	2345	2475	−130
13	(Germany) Brose Bamberg	30	10	20	2369	2404	−35
14	(Israel) Maccabi Tel Aviv	30	10	20	2333	2493	−160
15	(Russia) UNICS	30	8	22	2288	2408	−120
16	(Italy) EA7 Emporio Armani Milan	30	8	22	2411	2606	−195

Source: EuroLeague
Rules for classification: All points scored in extra period(s) will not be counted in the standings, nor for any tie-break situation.

==== Results by round ====
Round	1	2	3	4	5	6	7	8	9	10	11	12	13	14	15	16	17	18	19	20	21	22	23	24	25	26	27	28	29	30
Ground	H	A	A	H	A	H	H	A	H	A	H	A	H	A	H	A	A	H	H	A	H	A	H	A	A	H	A	H	A	H
Result	W	W	L	L	L	W	W	L	L	L	L	L	L	L	L	L	L	W	W	L	W	L	L	L	L	L	L	L	W	
Position	6	3	9	11	12	9	7	10	9	13	13	14	15	15	15	15	16	15	16	15	15	16	16	16	16	16	16	16	15	

Last updated: March 31, 2017.
Source: Competitive matches
Ground: A = Away; H = Home; R = Rest. Result: L = Loss; W = Win; R = Rest; P = Postponed.

==== Matches ====
Win Loss

13 October 2016 1	EA7 Emporio Armani Milan (Italy)	99–97	(Israel) Maccabi Tel Aviv	Assago
20:00 (CEST)	Scoring by quarter: 25–24, 19–20, 28–21, 27–32
	Pts: Hickman 22; Rebs: Pascolo 6 Asts: Simon 9 PIR: Hickman 32	Boxscore	Pts: Goudelock 27; Rebs: Smith 7 Asts: Goudelock 5 PIR: Goudelock 33	Arena: Mediolanum Forum; Attendance: 8,777; Referees: Ilija Belošević (SRB), Damir Javor (SLO), Emin Moğulkoç (TUR)

20 October 2016 2	Darüşşafaka Doğuş (Turkey)	80–81	(Italy) EA7 Emporio Armani Milan	Istanbul
20:45 (CEST)	Scoring by quarter: 23–24, 18–22, 17–14, 22–21
	Pts: Moerman 20; Rebs: Moerman 5 Asts: Wanamaker 6 PIR: Moerman 19	Boxscore	Pts: Mačvan 19; Rebs: McLean 8 Asts: Hickman 5 PIR: Mačvan 21	Arena: Volkswagen Arena; Attendance: 4,587; Referees: Christos Christodoulou (GRE), Robert Lottermosser (GER), Aare Halliko (EST)

25 October 2016 3	Olympiacos (Greece)	91–81	(Italy) EA7 Emporio Armani Milan	Piraeus
20:00 (CEST)	Scoring by quarter: 25–19, 21–22, 24–20, 21–20
	Pts: Green, Spanoulis 16; Rebs: Printezis 7 Asts: Spanoulis 4 PIR: Birch 16	Boxscore	Pts: Simon 16; Rebs: Raduljica 8 Asts: Gentile, Hickman 4 PIR: Raduljica 18	Arena: Peace and Friendship Stadium; Attendance: 6,000 (Tentative); Referees: Saša Pukl (SLO), Fernando Rocha (POR), David Romano (ISR)

27 October 2016 4	EA7 Emporio Armani Milan (Italy)	90–101	(Spain) Real Madrid	Assago
20:00 (CEST)	Scoring by quarter: 20–26, 21–26, 25–23, 24–26
	Pts: Hickman 19; Rebs: Sanders 6 Asts: Simon 6 PIR: Hickman 24	Boxscore	Pts: Randolph 20; Rebs: Randolph 14; Asts: Llull 6 PIR: Randolph 26	Arena: Mediolanum Forum; Attendance: 12,331 (tentative); Referees: Elias Koromilas (GRE), Matej Boltauzer (SLO), Petri Mäntylä (FIN)

3 November 2016 5	Brose Bamberg (Germany)	106–102(OT)	(Italy) EA7 Emporio Armani Milan	Bamberg
20:00 (CET)	Scoring by quarter: 18–21, 20–25, 23–18, 30–27, Overtime: 15–11
	Pts: Miller 27; Rebs: Melli 9 Asts: Strēlnieks 6 PIR: Miller 20	Boxscore	Pts: Sanders 25; Rebs: McLean 9 Asts: Gentile 5 PIR: Sanders 31	Arena: Brose Arena; Attendance: 6,249 (tentative); Referees: Miguel Ángel Pérez Pérez (ESP), Milivoje Jovčić (SRB), Mario Majkić (SLO)

10 November 2016 6	EA7 Emporio Armani Milan (Italy)	105–92	(Turkey) Anadolu Efes	Assago
20:45 (CET)	Scoring by quarter: 25–24, 30–25, 24–18, 26–25
	Pts: Sanders 22; Rebs: Simon 9 Asts: Simon 8 PIR: Simon 29	Boxscore	Pts: Heurtel 18; Rebs: Dunston 8 Asts: Heurtel 7 PIR: Dunston 23	Arena: Mediolanum Forum; Attendance: 10,494 (tentative); Referees: Damir Javor (SLO), Ioannis Foufis (GRE), Milija Vojinović (SRB)

15 November 2016 7	EA7 Emporio Armani Milan (Italy)	88–76	(Spain) Baskonia	Desio
20:45 (CET)	Scoring by quarter: 27–17, 22–18, 23–21, 16–20
	Pts: Sanders 19; Rebs: McLean 5 Asts: Hickman 3 PIR: Sanders 16	Boxscore	Pts: Larkin 21; Rebs: Voigtmann 6 Asts: Larkin 9 PIR: Larkin 36	Arena: PalaBancoDesio; Attendance: 6,416 (tentative); Referees: Borys Rhyzhyk (UKR), Robert Lottermoser (GER), Elias Koromilas (GRE)

17 November 2016 8	Crvena zvezda mts (Serbia)	83–70	(Italy) EA7 Emporio Armani Milan	Belgrade
19:00 (CET)	Scoring by quarter: 14–19, 23–13, 17–14, 29–24
	Pts: Simonović 23; Rebs: Bjelica, Kuzmić 7 Asts: Wolters 6 PIR: Simonović 22	Boxscore	Pts: Gentile 14; Rebs: Raduljica 6 Asts: Kalnietis 4 PIR: Gentile, Simon 12	Arena: Kombank Arena; Attendance: 10,279; Referees: Fernando Rocha (POR), Daniel Hierrezuelo (ESP), Anne Panther (GER)

24 November 2016 9	EA7 Emporio Armani Milan (Italy)	70–79	(Turkey) Fenerbahçe	Assago
20:45 (CET)	Scoring by quarter: 17–21, 19–23, 27–14, 7–21
	Pts: Sanders 17; Rebs: McLean 8 Asts: Kalnietis 6 PIR: McLean 22	Boxscore	Pts: Sloukas 18; Rebs: Sloukas 7 Asts: Sloukas 4 PIR: Sloukas 25	Arena: Mediolanum Forum; Attendance: 12,046; Referees: Benjamín Jiménez (ESP), Oļegs Latiševs (LAT), Jakub Zamojski (POL)

1 December 2016 10	UNICS (Russia)	100–79	(Italy) EA7 Emporio Armani Milan	Kazan
17:00 (CET)	Scoring by quarter: 35–24, 22–19, 16–26, 27–10
	Pts: Langford 25; Rebs: Colom 6 Asts: Colom 12; PIR: Langford 29	Boxscore	Pts: McLean 16; Rebs: Dragić 5 Asts: three players 3 PIR: Hickman 15	Arena: Basket Hall Kazan; Attendance: 3,500 (tentative); Referees: Elias Koromilas (GRE), Carlos Cortés (ESP), Rain Peerandi (EST)

8 December 2016 11	EA7 Emporio Armani Milan (Italy)	64–79	(Russia) CSKA Moscow	Assago
20:00 (CET)	Scoring by quarter: 23–21, 15–15, 16–30, 10–13
	Pts: Raduljica 11; Rebs: Dragić, McLean 6 Asts: Mačvan 3 PIR: Hickman 16	Boxscore	Pts: Jackson, Kulagin 14; Rebs: Kurbanov 7 Asts: Jackson 5 PIR: Jackson 19	Arena: Mediolanum Forum; Attendance: 12,331 (tentative); Referees: Daniel Hierrezuelo (ESP), Milivoje Jovčić (SRB), Mario Majkić (SLO)

16 December 2016 12	Galatasaray Odeabank (Turkey)	83–80	(Italy) EA7 Emporio Armani Milan	Istanbul
18:00 (CET)	Scoring by quarter: 21–15, 22–17, 19–27, 21–21
	Pts: Micov 23; Rebs: Tyus 7 Asts: Güler, Schilb 5 PIR: Micov 27	Boxscore	Pts: Sanders 18; Rebs: Dragić 8 Asts: three players 4 PIR: Hickman, Raduljica 16	Arena: Abdi İpekçi Arena; Attendance: 3,820; Referees: Saša Pukl (SLO), Juan Carlos García González (ESP), Anne Panther (GER)

21 December 2016 13	EA7 Emporio Armani Milan (Italy)	72–86	(Greece) Panathinaikos Superfoods	Assago
20:00 (CET)	Scoring by quarter: 21–16, 8–24, 13–24, 30–22
	Pts: McLean 16; Rebs: McLean 9 Asts: Kalnietis 6 PIR: McLean 24	Boxscore	Pts: James 19; Rebs: Singleton 10; Asts: N. Calathes 6 PIR: James 25	Arena: Mediolanum Forum; Attendance: 8,468 (tentative); Referees: Damir Javor (SLO), Piotr Pastusiak (POL), Seffi Shemmesh (ISR)

23 December 2016 14	FC Barcelona Lassa (Spain)	89–75	(Italy) EA7 Emporio Armani Milan	Barcelona
21:00 (CET)	Scoring by quarter: 32–19, 17–16, 23–16, 17–24
	Pts: Tomić 19; Rebs: Dorsey 10; Asts: Rice 11; PIR: Tomić 32	Boxscore	Pts: Sanders 27; Rebs: three players 4 Asts: Hickman 8 PIR: Sanders 29	Arena: Palau Blaugrana; Attendance: 4,911 (tentative); Referees: Ilija Belošević (SRB), Sašo Petek (SLO), Amit Balak (ISR)

29 December 2016 15	EA7 Emporio Armani Milan (Italy)	70–78	(Lithuania) Žalgiris	Assago
20:45 (CET)	Scoring by quarter: 16–21, 17–15, 23–20, 14–22
	Pts: Kalnietis 16; Rebs: Sanders 5 Asts: McLean 5 PIR: Sanders 15	Boxscore	Pts: Milaknis 16; Rebs: Jankūnas 11; Asts: Pangos 7 PIR: Milaknis 17	Arena: Mediolanum Forum; Attendance: 9,851; Referees: Fernando Rocha (POR), Robert Lottermoser (GER), Ioannis Foufis (GRE)

6 January 2017 16	Fenerbahçe (Turkey)	86–79	(Italy) EA7 Emporio Armani Milan	Istanbul
18:45 (CET)	Scoring by quarter: 18–19, 23–21, 22–18, 23–21
	Pts: Nunnally 19; Rebs: Udoh 8 Asts: Nunnally 5 PIR: Nunnally, Udoh 23	Boxscore	Pts: Kalnietis 20; Rebs: Raduljica 5 Asts: Dragić, Hickman 4 PIR: Kalnietis 23	Arena: Fenerbahçe Ülker Sports Arena; Attendance: 8,308; Referees: Christos Christodoulou (GRE), Matej Boltauzer (SLO), Carlos Cortés (ESP)

13 January 2017 17	CSKA Moscow (Russia)	101–64	(Italy) EA7 Emporio Armani Milan	Moscow
18:00 (CET)	Scoring by quarter: 27–9, 29–16, 22–21, 23–18
	Pts: de Colo 22; Rebs: Augustine 6 Asts: Teodosić 7 PIR: de Colo 30	Boxscore	Pts: Mačvan 19; Rebs: Mačvan 11; Asts: Simon 5 PIR: Mačvan 33	Arena: Megasport Arena; Attendance: 7,511; Referees: Miguel Pérez Pérez (ESP), Petri Mäntylä (FIN), Rain Peerandi (EST)

19 January 2017 18	EA7 Emporio Armani Milan (Italy)	92–87	(Turkey) Galatasaray Odeabank	Assago
20:15 (CET)	Scoring by quarter: 23–21, 26–18, 22–21, 21–27
	Pts: Simon 19; Rebs: Mačvan 6 Asts: Simon 5 PIR: Simon 22	Boxscore	Pts: Fitipaldo, Güler 17; Rebs: Tyus, Pleiß 5 Asts: Schilb 8 PIR: Güler 22	Arena: Mediolanum Forum; Attendance: 8,930 (tentative); Referees: Robert Lottermoser (GER), Milivoje Jovčić (SRB), Jakub Zamojski (POL)

25 January 2017 19	EA7 Emporio Armani Milan (Italy)	99–83	(Greece) Olympiacos	Assago
20:45 (CET)	Scoring by quarter: 15–21, 26–20, 26–20, 32–22
	Pts: Simon 16; Rebs: Mačvan, Pascolo 6 Asts: Simon 7 PIR: Pascolo, Simon 25	Boxscore	Pts: Printezis 16; Rebs: Birch, Papanikolaou 8 Asts: Spanoulis 4 PIR: Papanikolaou 19	Arena: Mediolanum Forum; Attendance: 8,040 (Tentative); Referees: Fernando Rocha (POR), Juan Carlos García González (ESP), Mario Majkić (SLO)

27 January 2017 20	Real Madrid (Spain)	94–89	(Italy) EA7 Emporio Armani Milan	Madrid
21:00 (CET)	Scoring by quarter: 22–18, 24–31, 23–24, 25–16
	Pts: Llull 20; Rebs: Randolph, Ayón 8 Asts: Llull 9 PIR: Dončić 23	Boxscore	Pts: Simon 20; Rebs: Mačvan 7 Asts: Kalnietis 4 PIR: Simon 21	Arena: WiZink Center; Attendance: 10,358; Referees: Borys Ryzhyk (UKR), Elias Koromilas (GRE), Aare Halliko (EST)

2 February 2017 21	EA7 Emporio Armani Milan (Italy)	89–87	(Turkey) Darüşşafaka Doğuş	Assago
20:45 (CET)	Scoring by quarter: 20–24, 18–27, 23–22, 28–14
	Pts: Pascolo, Simon 15; Rebs: Sanders 8 Asts: Simon 4 PIR: Simon 19	Boxscore	Pts: Wanamaker 20; Rebs: Žižić 8 Asts: Wanamaker 6 PIR: Wanamaker 29	Arena: Mediolanum Forum; Attendance: 8,072; Referees: Spiros Gkontas (GRE), Benjamin Jiménez (ESP), Uroš Obrknežević (SRB)

9 February 2017 22	Anadolu Efes (Turkey)	90–86	(Italy) EA7 Emporio Armani Milan	Istanbul
18:30 (CET)	Scoring by quarter: 15–27, 25–27, 29–20, 21–12
	Pts: Heurtel 17; Rebs: Granger 6 Asts: Heurtel 6 PIR: Heurtel 21	Boxscore	Pts: Sanders 18; Rebs: McLean 6 Asts: Hickman, Simon 8 PIR: Hickman, Kalnietis 20	Arena: Abdi İpekçi Arena; Attendance: 5,284; Referees: Miguel Pérez Pérez (ESP), Jakub Zamojski (POL), Petri Mäntylä (FIN)

23 February 2017 23	EA7 Emporio Armani Milan (Italy)	78–83	(Spain) FC Barcelona Lassa	Assago
20:45 (CET)	Scoring by quarter: 22–22, 23–19, 10–24, 23–18
	Pts: Abass 14; Rebs: Cinciarini 5 Asts: Kalnietis 6 PIR: Cinciarini 17	Boxscore	Pts: Tomić 19; Rebs: Tomić 9 Asts: Rice 6 PIR: Tomić 24	Arena: Mediolanum Forum; Attendance: 9,688; Referees: Emin Moğulkoç (TUR), Piotr Pastusiak (POL), Seffi Shemmesh (ISR)

2 March 2017 24	Baskonia (Spain)	87–74	(Italy) EA7 Emporio Armani Milan	Vitoria-Gasteiz
21:00 (CET)	Scoring by quarter: 23–20, 15–17, 28–16, 21–21
	Pts: Tillie 19; Rebs: Voigtmann 7 Asts: Larkin 11; PIR: Tillie 31	Boxscore	Pts: three players 11; Rebs: Mačvan 6 Asts: Hickman 8 PIR: Mačvan, Cinciarini 11	Arena: Fernando Buesa Arena; Attendance: 9,763; Referees: Borys Ryzhyk (UKR), Spiros Gkontas (GRE), Sergio Silva (POR)

9 March 2017 25	Maccabi Tel Aviv (Israel)	92–82	(Italy) EA7 Emporio Armani Milan	Tel Aviv
20:05 (CET)	Scoring by quarter: 26–20, 25–15, 19–26, 22–21
	Pts: Rudd 17; Rebs: Iverson 9 Asts: Mekel 8 PIR: Seeley, Iverson 22	Boxscore	Pts: Sanders 19; Rebs: three players 7 Asts: McLean 8 PIR: Hickman, Cinciarini 17	Arena: Menora Mivtachim Arena; Attendance: 8,050 (tentative); Referees: Juan Carlos García González (ESP), Jakub Zamojski (POL), Rain Peerandi (EST)

16 March 2017 26	EA7 Emporio Armani Milan (Italy)	71–78	(Serbia) Crvena zvezda mts	Assago
20:45 (CET)	Scoring by quarter: 10–25, 21–18, 19–17, 21–18
	Pts: Hickman 14; Rebs: Pascolo 7 Asts: Cinciarini 4 PIR: McLean 13	Boxscore	Pts: Kuzmić 15; Rebs: Kuzmić 7 Asts: Gudurić 5 PIR: Kuzmić 24	Arena: Mediolanum Forum; Attendance: 11,067; Referees: Daniel Hierrezuelo (ESP), Oļegs Latiševs (LAT), Clemens Fritz (GER)

21 March 2017 27	Panathinaikos Superfoods (Greece)	74–61	(Italy) EA7 Emporio Armani Milan	Athens
20:15 (CET)	Scoring by quarter: 21–15, 17–10, 19–15, 17–21
	Pts: N. Calathes, James 13; Rebs: Gabriel 8 Asts: N. Calathes 4 PIR: N. Calathes 13	Boxscore	Pts: Abass 15; Rebs: Cinciarini 8 Asts: Mačvan, Cinciarini 4 PIR: Cinciarini 20	Arena: Olympic Sports Center Athens; Attendance: 6,195; Referees: Miguel Pérez Pérez (ESP), Seffi Shemmesh (ISR), Sérgio Silva (POR)

23 March 2017 28	EA7 Emporio Armani Milan (Italy)	76–84	(Germany) Brose Bamberg	Assago
20:45 (CET)	Scoring by quarter: 14–29, 22–21, 16–14, 24–20
	Pts: Hickman 20; Rebs: Raduljica 9 Asts: Hickman, Kalnietis 4 PIR: Raduljica 27	Boxscore	Pts: Causeur 17; Rebs: Causeur, Melli 8 Asts: Zisis 7 PIR: Causeur 23	Arena: Mediolanum Forum; Attendance: 8,098 (tentative); Referees: Borys Ryzhyk (UKR), Sašo Petek (SLO), Petros Papapetrou (GRE)

31 March 2017 29	Žalgiris (Lithuania)	84–88	(Italy) EA7 Emporio Armani Milan	Kaunas
19:00 (CEST)	Scoring by quarter: 27–18, 14–21, 22–24, 21–25
	Pts: Pangos 16; Rebs: Jankūnas 8 Asts: Lekavičius, Westermann 7 PIR: Jankūnas 20	Boxscore	Pts: McLean, Cinciarini 17; Rebs: Mačvan, Abass 5 Asts: Mačvan 5 PIR: Abass 22	Arena: Žalgirio Arena; Attendance: 15,231 (tentative); Referees: Benjamín Jiménez (ESP), Jakub Zamojski (POL), Mario Majkić (SLO)

7 April 2017 30	EA7 Emporio Armani Milan (Italy)	vs.	(Russia) UNICS	Assago
20:45 (CEST)
		Boxscore		Arena: Mediolanum Forum

==== Results overview ====
Win Draw Loss

Opposition	Home score	Away score	Double
(Turkey) Anadolu Efes	105–92	90–86	191–182
(Spain) Baskonia	88–76	87–74	162–163
(Germany) Brose Bamberg	76–84	106–102	178–190
(Serbia) Crvena Zvezda mts	71–78	83–70	141–161
(Russia) CSKA Moscow	64–79	101–64	128–180
(Turkey) Darüşşafaka Doğuş	89–87	80–81	170–167
(Spain) FC Barcelona Lassa	78–83	89–75	153–172
(Turkey) Fenerbahçe	70–79	86–79	149–165
(Turkey) Galatasaray Odeabank	92–87	83–80	172–170
(Israel) Maccabi Tel Aviv	99–97	92–82	181–189
(Greece) Olympiacos	99–83	91–81	180–174
(Greece) Panathinaikos Superfoods	72–86	74–61	133–160
(Spain) Real Madrid	90–101	94–89	179–195
(Russia) UNICS		100–79	
(Lithuania) Žalgiris	70–78	84–88	158–162

=== Italian Cup ===
Win Loss

16 February 2016 Quarterfinals	EA7 Emporio Armani Milano	77–75	Enel Brindisi	Rimini
20:45 (CET)	Scoring by quarter: 28–18, 17–26, 16–17, 16–14
	Pts: McLean 14; Rebs: Mačvan, McLean 7 Asts: Kalnietis 7 PIR: Kalnietis 18	Boxscore	Pts: three players 15; Rebs: M'Baye 9 Asts: Moore 4 PIR: M'Baye 22	Arena: Padiglioni Fiera Rimini; Referees: Tolga Sahin, Dino Seghetti, Alessandro Vicino

18 February 2016 Semifinals	EA7 Emporio Armani Milano	87–84	Grissin Bon Reggio Emilia	Rimini
17:30 (CET)	Scoring by quarter: 18–26, 27–19, 14–19, 28–20
	Pts: Sanders 22; Rebs: McLean 7 Asts: three players 5 PIR: Sanders 27	Boxscore	Pts: Aradori 14; Rebs: Polonara 6 Asts: Della Valle, Kaukėnas 4 PIR: three players 15	Arena: Padiglioni Fiera Rimini; Referees: Carmelo Lo Guzzo, Manuel Mazzoni, Michele Rossi

19 February 2016 Finals	EA7 Emporio Armani Milano	84–74	Banco di Sardegna Sassari	Rimini
18:00 (CET)	Scoring by quarter: 11–19, 23–17, 22–18, 28–20
	Pts: Hickman 25; Rebs: Mačvan 7 Asts: Cinciarini 4 PIR: Hickman 26	Boxscore	Pts: Lacey 15; Rebs: Lydeka 9 Asts: Sacchetti 4 PIR: Lawal 17	Arena: Padiglioni Fiera Rimini; Referees: Roberto Begnis, Dino Seghetti, Massimiliano Filippini
