= 2016 Italian Basketball Cup =

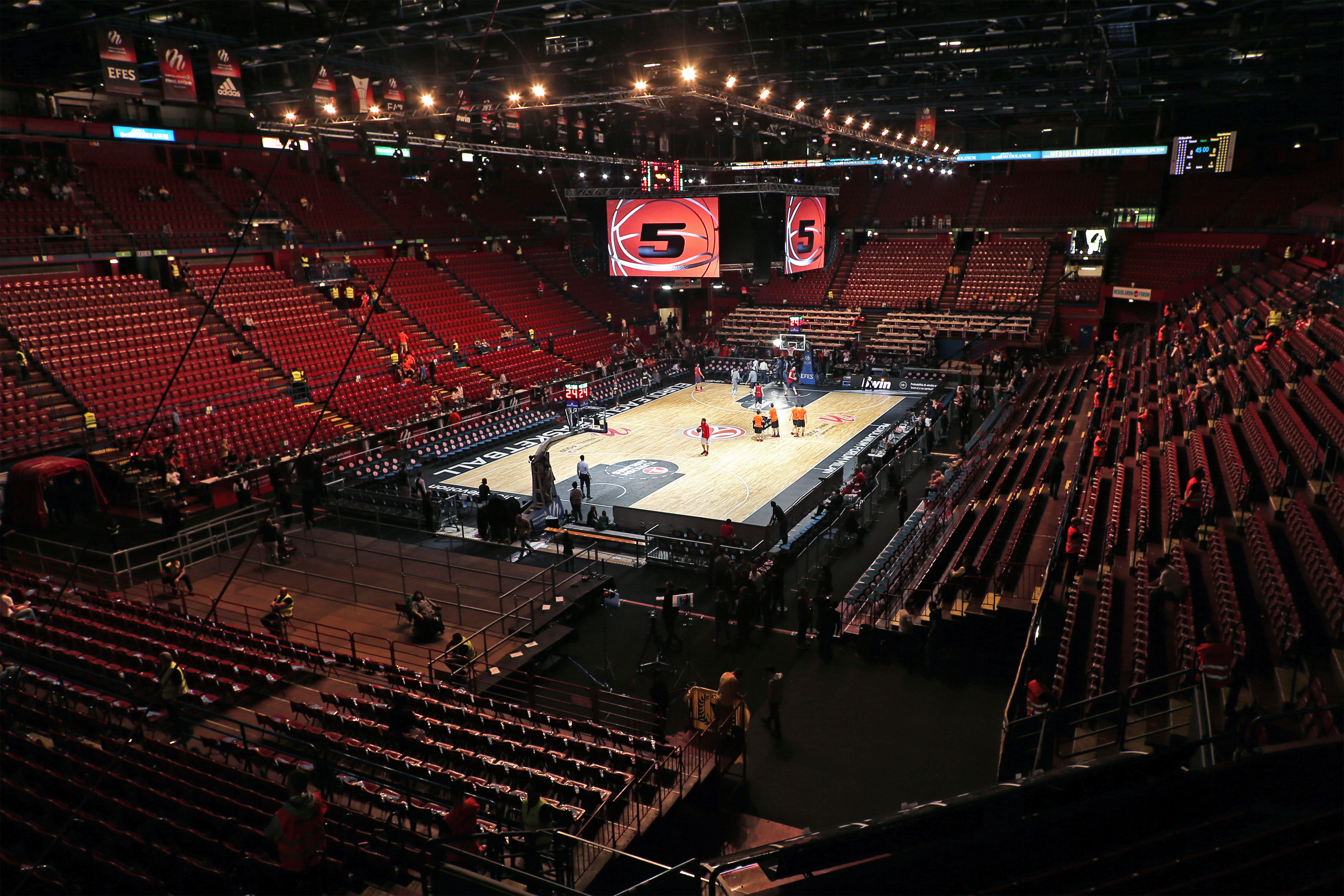
- The Mediolanum Forum hosted the 2016 Cup
- Duration: February 19–21, 2016
- Games played: 7
- Teams: 8

Regular season
- Season MVP: (United States) Rakim Sanders

Finals
- Champions: EA7 Emporio Armani Milano; 5th title
- Runners-up: Sidigas Avellino
- Semifinalists: Vanoli Cremona; Dolomiti Energia Trento

The 2016 Italian Basketball Cup, known as the Beko Final Eight for sponsorship reasons, was the 48th edition of Italy's national cup tournament. Lega Basket organised the competition for Lega Basket Serie A clubs. The tournament was played at the Mediolanum Forum in Milan this year. EA7 Emporio Armani Milano won their 5th cup.

== Qualification ==
EA7 Emporio Armani Milano was automatically qualified for the tournament as the host team. The rest of the teams were selected based on their place in the 2015–16 Lega Basket Serie A standings.

1. Grissin Bon Reggio Emilia
2. EA7 Emporio Armani Milano
3. Vanoli Cremona
4. Giorgio Tesi Group Pistoia
5. Dolomiti Energia Trento
6. Banco di Sardegna Sassari
7. Umana Reyer Venezia
8. Sidigas Avellino

== Bracket ==
Quarter-finals
1	Grissin Bon Reggio Emilia	84
8	Sidigas Avellino	94
4	Giorgio Tesi Group Pistoia	74
5	Dolomiti Energia Trento	81
3	Vanoli Cremona	97
6	Dinamo Sassari	89
2	EA7 Emporio Milano	88
7	Reyer Venezia	59

Semifinals
8	Sidigas Avellino	71
5	Dolomiti Energia Trento	69
3	Vanoli Cremona	58
2	EA7 Emporio Milano	90

Final
8	Sidigas Avellino	76
2	EA7 Emporio Milano	82

== Quarterfinals ==
=== Giorgio Tesi Group Pistoia vs. Dolomiti Energia Trento ===
19 February 2016 Quarterfinal A	Giorgio Tesi Group Pistoia	74–81	Dolomiti Energia Trento	Milan
12:00 (CET)	Scoring by quarter: 15–17, 24–20, 10–26, 25–18
RAI	Pts: Czyż 20; Rebs: Czyż, Lombardi 7 Asts: Knowles 6 PIR: Czyż 22	Boxscore	Pts: Wright 18; Rebs: Wright 9 Asts: Poeta 5 PIR: Wright 24	Arena: Mediolanum Forum; Referees: Begnis, Taurino, Weidmann

=== Vanoli Cremona vs. Banco di Sardegna Sassari ===
19 February 2016 Quarterfinal B	Vanoli Cremona	97–89(OT)	Banco di Sardegna Sassari	Milan
15:15 (CET)	Scoring by quarter: 20–23, 14–6, 15–27, 28–21, Overtime: 20–12
RAI	Pts: Turner 28; Rebs: Washington 7 Asts: McGee 7 PIR: Turner 31	Boxscore	Pts: Logan 29; Rebs: Mitchell 12; Asts: Logan 8 PIR: Logan 41	Arena: Mediolanum Forum; Referees: Attard, Lamonica, Sabetta

=== Grissin Bon Reggio Emilia vs. Sidigas Avellino ===
19 February 2016 Quarterfinal C	Grissin Bon Reggio Emilia	87–94	Sidigas Avellino	Milan
18:15 (CET)	Scoring by quarter: 22–17, 17–27, 14–18, 34–32
RAI	Pts: Polonara 15; Rebs: Golubović 7 Asts: De Nicolao 4 PIR: three players 16	Boxscore	Pts: Veikalas 21; Rebs: Cervi 8 Asts: Ragland 7 PIR: Ragland 28	Arena: Mediolanum Forum; Referees: Baldini, Lo Guzzo, Seghetti

=== EA7 Emporio Armani Milano vs. Umana Reyer Venezia ===
19 February 2016 Quarterfinal D	EA7 Emporio Armani Milano	88–59	Umana Reyer Venezia	Milan
20:45 (CET)	Scoring by quarter: 18–10, 20–21, 28–13, 22–15
RAI	Pts: Sanders 16; Rebs: McLean, Jenkins 7 Asts: Simon 4 PIR: McLean 19	Boxscore	Pts: Owens 12; Rebs: Ortner, Viggiano 5 Asts: Green 3 PIR: Ortner 9	Arena: Mediolanum Forum; Referees: Caiazza, Mazzoni, Paternicò

== Semifinals ==
=== Dolomiti Energia Trento vs. Sidigas Avellino ===
20 February 2016 Semifinal 1	Dolomiti Energia Trento	69–71	Sidigas Avellino	Milan
18:15 (CET)	Scoring by quarter: 16–18, 14–16, 23–21, 16–16
RAI	Pts: Forray, Wright 15; Rebs: Forray 9 Asts: Wright 3 PIR: Pascolo 18	Boxscore	Pts: Cervi, Buva 19; Rebs: Leunen 12; Asts: Green 7 PIR: Cervi 22	Arena: Mediolanum Forum; Referees: Bettini, Filippini, Sahin

Starters:			Pts	Reb	Ast
PG	9	(Argentina) Andrés Pablo Forray	15	9	1
SG	13	(United States) Dominique Sutton	4	7	1
SF	15	(Italy) Davide Pascolo	13	8	2
PF	4	(United States) Jamarr Sanders	3	3	2
C	12	(United States) Julian Wright	15	6	3
Reserves:					
PG	3	(Italy) Giuseppe Poeta	2	2	2
PF	12	(Italy) Diego Flaccadori	5	1	0
SG	24	(United States) Trent Lockett	4	2	1
C	25	(Italy) Luca Lechthaler	DNP		
C	40	(United States) Jared Berggren	8	3	0
Head coach:
(Italian Basketball Federation) Maurizio Buscaglia

Dolomiti Energia Trento	Sidigas Avellino

Starters:			Pts	Reb	Ast
PG	1	(United States) Marques Green	10	6	7
SG	9	(United States) Alex Acker	0	0	1
SF	21	(United States) James Nunnally	10	3	4
PF	10	(United States) Maarten Leunen	7	12	1
C	13	(Italy) Riccardo Cervi	19	4	0
Reserves:					
PG	00	(Italy) Mattia Norcino	DNP		
SG	4	(United States) Joe Ragland	3	2	3
SG	6	(Lithuania) Benas Veikalas	3	2	2
PG	19	(Italy) Giovanni Severini	0	0	0
C	22	(Italy) Giovanni Pini	0	0	0
PF	25	(Croatia) Ivan Buva	19	6	0
PG	57	(Italy) Salvatore Parlato	DNP		
Head coach:
(Italian Basketball Federation) Stefano Sacripanti

=== Vanoli Cremona vs. EA7 Emporio Armani Milano ===
20 February 2016 Semifinal 2	Vanoli Cremona	58–90	EA7 Emporio Armani Milano	Milan
20:45 (CET)	Scoring by quarter: 17–24, 14–21, 14–31, 13–14
RAI	Pts: Washington 15; Rebs: Nikola Dragović 6 Asts: three players 2 PIR: Washington 17	Boxscore	Pts: Simon 17; Rebs: Simon, Magro 9 Asts: four players 3 PIR: Simon 22	Arena: Mediolanum Forum; Referees: Lanzarini, Sardella, Aronne

Starters:			Pts	Reb	Ast
PG	15	(Italy) Nicolò Cazzolato	15	9	1
SG	31	(United States) Elston Turner	4	7	1
SF	17	(United States) Deron Washington	13	8	2
PF	1	(Serbia) Nikola Dragović	3	3	2
C	12	(Italy) Marco Cusin	15	6	3
Reserves:					
SG	9	(Italy) Fabio Mian	5	3	0
C	10	(Italy) Raphael Gaspardo	6	5	0
SF	16	(Italy) Dario Boccasavia	0	0	1
C	19	(Italy) Paul Biligha	2	1	0
PG	25	(United States) Tyrus McGee	12	4	0
Head coach:
(Italian Basketball Federation) Cesare Pancotto

Vanoli Cremona	EA7 Emporio Armani Milano

Starters:			Pts	Reb	Ast
PG	20	(Italy) Andrea Cinciarini	13	4	1
SG	22	(United States) Charles Jenkins	10	5	1
SF	43	(Croatia) Krunoslav Simon	17	9	2
PF	13	(Serbia) Milan Mačvan	10	3	3
C	15	(Italy) Daniele Magro	8	9	0
Reserves:					
C	1	(United States) Jamel McLean	7	5	3
SG	3	(Croatia) Oliver Lafayette	4	1	3
SF	5	(Italy) Alessandro Gentile	DNP		
PG	6	(Italy) Andrea Amato	3	0	0
PG	9	(Lithuania) Mantas Kalnietis	2	1	2
SG	16	(Italy) Simone Vecerina	0	1	1
SF	21	(United States) Rakim Sanders	16	7	3
Head coach:
(Croatian Basketball Federation) Jasmin Repeša

== Final ==
EA7 Emporio Milano took the lead when the game started and didn't lose it for the rest of the game. Milano eventually won its first Cup since over 20 years.

21 February 2016	Sidigas Avellino	76–82	EA7 Emporio Armani Milano	Milan
18:00 (CET)	Scoring by quarter: 11–21, 25–22, 19–17, 21–22
RAI	Pts: Nunnally 25; Rebs: Leunen, Green 6 Asts: Green 6 PIR: Nunnally 30	Boxscore	Pts: Sanders 17; Rebs: Sanders 7 Asts: Lafayette 6 PIR: Sanders 20	Arena: Mediolanum Forum; Referees: Luigi Lamonica, Manuel Mazzoni, Paolo Taurino

Starters:			Pts	Reb	Ast
PG	4	(United States) Marques Green	1	6	6
PF	10	(United States) Maarty Leunen	3	6	4
C	14	(Italy) Riccardo Cervi	8	2	0
SG	9	(United States) Alex Acker	9	2	4
SF	21	(United States) James Nunnally	25	2	1
Reserves:					
PF	25	(Croatia) Ivan Buva	13	5	2
C	22	(Italy) Giovanni Pini	0	2	1
SG	6	(Lithuania) Benas Veikalas	5	1	0
PG	1	(United States) Joe Ragland	8	4	2
PG	57	(Italy) Salvatore Parlato	DNP		
PG	0	(Italy) Mattia Norcino	DNP		
SG	19	(Italy) Giovanni Severini	0	0	0
Head coach:
(Italian Basketball Federation) Stefano Sacripanti

Sidigas Avellino	EA7 Emporio Armani Milano

Italian Cup MVP
(United States) Rakim Sanders
Game rules
Game played under FIBA rules.

2016 Italian Cup Winners

EA7 Emporio Armani Milano
5th title

Starters:			Pts	Reb	Ast
C	15	(Italy) Daniele Magro	2	1	0
PG	20	(Italy) Andrea Cinciarini	10	5	3
SG	21	(United States) Rakim Sanders	17	7	1
SF	43	(Croatia) Krunoslav Simon	8	5	2
SG	22	(United States) Charles Jenkins	8	4	0
Reserves:					
C	1	(United States) Jamel McLean	15	6	0
PG	9	(Lithuania) Mantas Kalnietis	5	4	4
PG	3	(Croatia) Oliver Lafayette	3	4	6
C	13	(Serbia) Milan Mačvan	14	5	1
SF	7	(Italy) Bruno Cerella	0	5	0
SG	5	(Italy) Alessandro Gentile	DNP		
PG	6	(Italy) Andrea Amato	DNP		
Head coach:
(Croatian Basketball Federation) Jasmin Repeša
