= 2016 Italian Basketball Supercup =

Tournament details
- Arena: Mediolanum Forum; Milan, Italy
- Dates: 24 September 2016– 25 September 2016

Final positions
- Champions: EA7 Emporio Armani Milano (1st title)
- Runners-up: Sidigas Avellino

Awards and statistics
- MVP: (Croatia) Krunoslav Simon

The 2016 Italian Basketball Supercup (Italian: Supercoppa di pallacanestro 2016) was the 22nd edition of the super cup tournament, organized by the Lega Basket Serie A. It was also called Macron Supercoppa 2016 for sponsorship reasons.

It was played in the Mediolanum Forum in Milan on 24 and 25 September.

EA7 Emporio Armani Milano won its first title after beating Vanoli Cremona in the semifinal and Sidigas Avellino in the final.

== Participant teams ==
Qualified for the tournament were EA7 Emporio Armani Milano, Sidigas Avellino, Grissin Bon Reggio Emilia and Vanoli Cremona.

Team	Qualified as	Appearance	Qualification date
EA7 Emporio Armani Milano	2015–16 season champion 2016 Cup champion	4th	21 February 2016
Grissin Bon Reggio Emilia	2015–16 season runner-up	2nd	13 June 2016
Sidigas Avellino	2016 Cup runner-up	2nd	21 February 2016
Vanoli Cremona	2016 Cup semi-finalist	1st	29 May 2016

== Bracket ==
Semi-finals; 24 September
Grissin Bon Reggio Emilia	72
Sidigas Avellino	74
EA7 Emporio Armani Milano	109
Vanoli Cremona	87

Final; 25 September
Sidigas Avellino	72
EA7 Emporio Armani Milano	90

== Semi-finals ==
=== Grissin Bon Reggio Emilia vs. Sidigas Avellino ===
24 September 2016	Grissin Bon Reggio Emilia	72–74	Sidigas Avellino	Milan
18:00 (CEST)	Scoring by quarter: 22–19, 19–21, 17–11, 14–23
Sky Sport	Pts: Polonara 18; Rebs: Polonara 7 Asts: Gentile 4 PIR: Polonara 25	Boxscore	Pts: Ragland 18; Rebs: Leunen 8 Asts: Green 6 PIR: Ragland 19	Arena: Mediolanum Forum; Referees: Dino Seghetti, Alessandro Vicino, Michele Rossi

Starters:			Pts	Reb	Ast
PG	9	(Italy) Andrea De Nicolao	7	2	1
PG	18	(Italy) Stefano Gentile	2	2	4
SF	4	(Italy) Pietro Aradori	13	1	2
PF	6	(Italy) Achille Polonara	18	7	0
C	14	(Italy) Riccardo Cervi	8	4	1
Reserves:					
PG	5	(Montenegro) Derek Needham	3	2	2
PF	7	(Guyana) Delroy James	4	3	0
SG	8	(Italy) Amedeo Della Valle	14	1	2
PG	10	(Italy) Francesco Bonacini	0	0	0
PF	15	(Serbia) Sava Lešić	3	4	0
C	20	(Italy) Alessandro Vigori	DNP		
Head coach:
(Italian Basketball Federation) Massimiliano Menetti

Grissin Bon Reggio Emilia	Sidigas Avellino

Starters:			Pts	Reb	Ast
PG	1	(Liberia) Joe Ragland	18	5	4
SG	55	(United States) Adonis Thomas	15	3	1
PF	10	(United States) Maarten Leunen	9	8	2
SF	32	(Belgium) Retin Obasohan	10	2	0
C	12	(Italy) Marco Cusin	4	4	2
Reserves:					
PF	0	(Italy) Andrea Zerini	0	0	1
PG	4	(North Macedonia) Marques Green	2	1	6
PF	7	(Italy) Claudio Strumia	DNP		
SG	19	(Italy) Giovanni Severini	0	0	0
SG	20	(United States) Levi Randolph	16	2	1
C	44	(Ukraine) Kyrylo Fesenko	DNP		
PG	57	(Italy) Salvatore Parlato	DNP		
Head coach:
(Italian Basketball Federation) Stefano Sacripanti

=== EA7 Emporio Armani Milano vs. Vanoli Cremona ===
24 September 2016	EA7 Emporio Armani Milano	109–87	Vanoli Cremona	Milan
20:45 (CEST)	Scoring by quarter: 29–28, 21–24, 27–9, 32–26
Sky Sport	Pts: Simon 18; Rebs: Pascolo 7 Asts: Kalnietis 6 PIR: Hickman 22	Boxscore	Pts: Turner 18; Rebs: Biligha 5 Asts: Turner, Holloway 3 PIR: Mian 17	Arena: Mediolanum Forum; Referees: Luca Weidmann, Gabriele Bettini, Lorenzo Baldini

Starters:			Pts	Reb	Ast
PG	9	(Lithuania) Mantas Kalnietis	4	1	6
SG	5	(Italy) Alessandro Gentile	8	3	2
SF	43	(Croatia) Krunoslav Simon	18	0	2
PF	14	(Italy) Davide Pascolo	10	7	0
C	11	(Serbia) Miroslav Raduljica	6	1	1
Reserves:					
PF	1	(United States) Jamel McLean	8	3	1
PG	7	(Georgia (country)) Ricky Hickman	15	3	5
SG	12	(Slovenia) Zoran Dragić	13	5	1
PG	20	(Italy) Andrea Cinciarini	7	3	4
PF	21	(United States) Rakim Sanders	17	5	2
SF	23	(Italy) Awudu Abass	0	0	0
SF	30	(Italy) Bruno Cerella	3	1	1
Head coach:
(Croatian Basketball Federation) Jasmin Repeša

EA7 Emporio Armani Milano	Vanoli Cremona

Starters:			Pts	Reb	Ast
PG	52	(United States) Tu Holloway	6	2	3
SG	31	(United States) Elston Turner	18	2	3
PF	35	(United States) TaShawn Thomas	5	2	1
SF	33	(United States) Omar Thomas	8	4	0
C	19	(Italy) Paul Biligha	7	5	1
Reserves:					
PG	6	(Italy) Andrea Amato	3	1	1
SG	7	(Italy) Fabio Mian	14	4	1
C	10	(Italy) Raphael Gaspardo	12	2	0
PF	18	(Poland) Jakub Wojciechowski	5	2	0
PG	32	(United States) Gabe York	9	2	1
Head coach:
(Italian Basketball Federation) Cesare Pancotto

== Final ==
EA7 Emporio Armani Milano lifted the Supercup trophy by downing Sidigas Avellino 72-90. Krunoslav Simon led the winners with 25 points on 5-of-7 three-point shots. Ricky Hickman added 15 while Zoran Dragić had 11 for Milan. Hickman had 9 points in the second quarter to make Milan get a double-digit lead, 34-44, at halftime. Dragić, Simon and Davide Pascolo allowed Milan to extend their margin to 51–67 after 30 minutes, enough to control the game until the final buzzer and lift its first Supercup trophy.

=== Sidigas Avellino vs. EA7 Emporio Armani Milano ===
25 September 2016	Sidigas Avellino	72–90	EA7 Emporio Armani Milano	Milan
18:15 (CEST)	Scoring by quarter: 19–23, 15–21, 17–23, 21–23
Sky Sport	Pts: Ragland 18; Rebs: Cusin, Obasohan 5 Asts: five players 2 PIR: Obasohan 17	Boxscore	Pts: Simon 25; Rebs: Dragić 7 Asts: Simon 8 PIR: Simon 30	Arena: Mediolanum Forum; Referees: Dino Seghetti, Luca Weidmann, Gabriele Bettini

Starters:			Pts	Reb	Ast
PG	1	(Liberia) Joe Ragland	18	2	2
SG	55	(United States) Adonis Thomas	10	2	2
PF	10	(United States) Maarten Leunen	6	4	2
SF	32	(Belgium) Retin Obasohan	12	5	1
C	44	(Ukraine) Kyrylo Fesenko	2	3	1
Reserves:					
PF	0	(Italy) Andrea Zerini	2	4	0
PG	4	(North Macedonia) Marques Green	9	0	2
PF	7	(Italy) Claudio Strumia	DNP		
C	12	(Italy) Marco Cusin	3	5	0
SG	19	(Italy) Giovanni Severini	DNP		
SG	20	(United States) Levi Randolph	10	1	2
PG	57	(Italy) Salvatore Parlato	DNP		
Head coach:
(Italian Basketball Federation) Stefano Sacripanti

Sidigas Avellino	EA7 Emporio Armani Milano

Italian Supercoppa MVP
(Croatia) Krunoslav Simon
Game rules
Game was played under FIBA rules.

2016 Italian Supercup Winners

EA7 Emporio Armani Milano
1st title

Starters:			Pts	Reb	Ast
PG	20	(Italy) Andrea Cinciarini	6	2	2
SG	12	(Slovenia) Zoran Dragić	11	7	3
SG	43	(Croatia) Krunoslav Simon	25	5	8
PF	14	(Italy) Davide Pascolo	6	4	0
C	13	(Serbia) Milan Mačvan	5	2	2
Reserves:					
PF	1	(United States) Jamel McLean	5	2	2
SG	2	(Italy) Simone Fontecchio	2	1	0
SF	5	(Italy) Alessandro Gentile	2	1	0
PG	7	(Georgia (country)) Ricky Hickman	15	3	1
PG	9	(Lithuania) Mantas Kalnietis	4	2	1
SF	21	(United States) Rakim Sanders	9	3	0
SF	30	(Italy) Bruno Cerella	0	1	0
Head coach:
(Croatian Basketball Federation) Jasmin Repeša
