= Reverberi =

Reverberi is a family name of Italian origin. It may refer to:

- Gian Franco Reverberi (1934–2024), Italian composer and musician
- Gian Piero Reverberi (born 1939), Italian composer, arranger and conductor
- Pietro Reverberi (1912–1985), Italian basketball referee
