= Premio Reverberi =

The Premio Reverberi (or Oscar del Basket) is a basketball prize that is awarded annually by the city of Quattro Castella, Italy, in collaboration with the Italian Basketball Federation and the Lega Basket, which is the organizing body of Italy's top-tier level professional basketball league, the LBA. It is dedicated to the memory of the late Italian basketball referee Pietro Reverberi.

Awards are given each year for the categories of Best Head coach, Best Male Player, Best Female Player, and Best Referee in Italian basketball.

== Winners ==
N.	Edition	Best Head Coach	Best Male Player	Best Female Player	Best Referee
1	1985–1986	-	-	-	-
2	1986–1987	-	-	-	-
3	1987–1988	-	-	-	-
4	1988–1989	-	-	-	-
5	1989–1990	-	-	-	-
6	1990–1991	-	-	-	-
7	1991–1992	-	-	-	-
8	1992–1993	-	-	-	-
9	1993–1994	-	-	-	-
10	1994–1995	-	-	-	-
11	1995–1996	-	-	-	-
12	1996–1997	-	-	-	-
13	1997–1998	-	-	-	-
14	1998–1999	-	-	-	-
15	1999–2000	-	-	-	Fabio Facchini
16	2000–2001	Aldo Corno	Gianmarco Pozzecco	Valentina Gardellin	Luciano Tola
17	2001–2002	-	Roberto Chiacig	-	-
18	2002–2003	Lino Lardo	Massimo Bulleri	Elisabetta Moro	Carmelo Paternicò
19	2003–2004	Fabrizio Frates	Giacomo Galanda	Laura Macchi	Paolo Taurino
20	2004–2005	Cesare Pancotto	Angelo Gigli	Raffaella Masciadri	Guerrini Cerebuch
21	2005–2006	Stefano Pillastrini	Marco Belinelli	Simona Ballardini	Mario Pozzana
22	2006–2007	Simone Pianigiani	Danilo Gallinari	Mariangela Cirone	Tolga Şahin
23	2007–2008	Matteo Boniciolli	Giuseppe Poeta	Francesca Zara	Enrico Sabetta
24	2008–2009	Andrea Capobianco	Pietro Aradori	Maria Chiara Franchini	Marcello Reatto
25	2009–2010	Giovanni Perdichizzi	Stefano Mancinelli	Giorgia Sottana	Gianluca Mattioli
26	2010–2011	Andrea Trinchieri	Daniel Hackett	Francesca Modica	Massimiliano Duranti
27	2011–2012	Frank Vitucci	Luigi Datome	Martina Crippa	Roberto Chiari
28	2012–2013	Luca Banchi	Andrea Cinciarini	Kathrin Ress	Luca Begnis
29	2013–2014	Massimiliano Menetti	Alessandro Gentile	Benedetta Bagnara	Saverio Lanzarini
30	2014–2015	Paolo Moretti	Achille Polonara	Francesca Dotto	Alessandro Martolini
31	2015–2016	Maurizio Buscaglia	Amedeo Della Valle	Cecilia Zandalasini	Dino Seghetti
32	2016–2017	Walter De Raffaele	Luca Vitali	Chiara Consolini	Massimiliano Filippini
33	2017–2018	Andrea Diana	Ariel Filloy	Martina Fassina	Mazzoni
34	2018–2019	Antimo Martino	Marco Spissu	Elisa Penna	Biggi
35	2019–2020	Eugenio Dalmasson	Stefano Tonut	Chiara Pastore	Carmelo Lo Guzzo
36	2021–2022	Marco Ramondino	Andrea Cinciarini	Laura Spreafico	Alessandro Vicino
37	2022–2023	Piero Bucchi	Nicolò Melli	Jasmine Keys	Mark Bartoli
38	2023–2024	Nicola Brienza	Nico Mannion	Matilde Villa	Silvia Marziali
39	2024–2025	Giuseppe Poeta	Alessandro Pajola	Cecilia Zandalasini	Carmelo Paternicò
