= Mantas Kalnietis =

Lithuanian basketball player

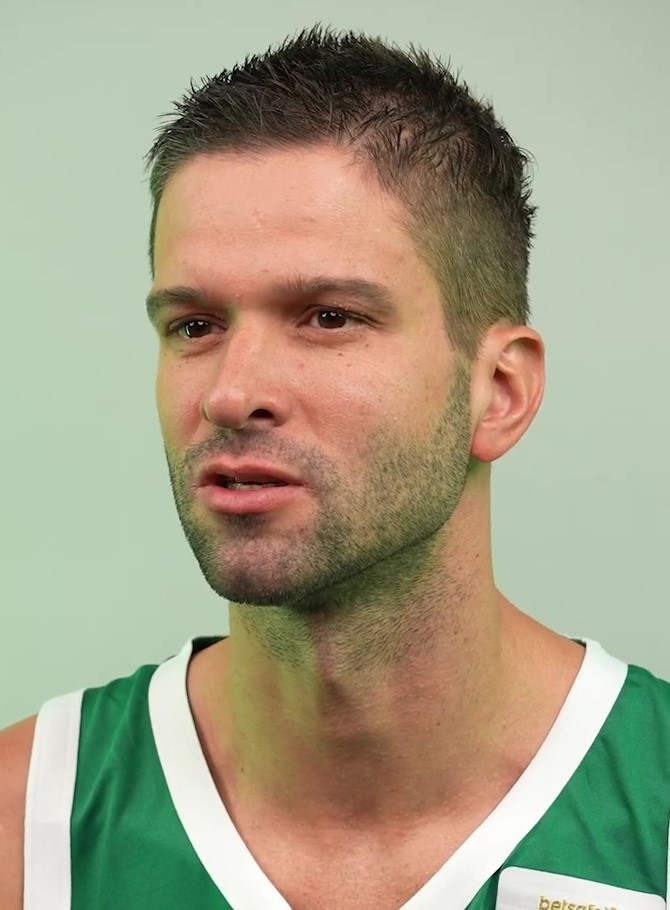
- Kalnietis with Žalgiris in 2021

Personal information
- Born: 6 September 1986 (age 40) Kaunas, Lithuania
- Listed height: 6 ft 5 in (1.96 m)
- Listed weight: 198 lb (90 kg)

Career information
- NBA draft: 2008: undrafted
- Playing career: 2003–2023
- Position: Point guard / shooting guard
- Number: 9

Career history
- 2003–2012: Žalgiris Kaunas
- 2003–2006: →Žalgiris-Arvydas Sabonis school
- 2012–2015: Lokomotiv Kuban
- 2015–2016: Žalgiris Kaunas
- 2016–2018: Olimpia Milano
- 2018–2019: ASVEL
- 2019–2021: Lokomotiv Kuban
- 2021–2023: Žalgiris Kaunas

Career highlights
- VTB United League MVP (2021); VTB United League assists leader (2021); VTB United League Top Lithuanian Player (2013); All-VTB United League First Team (2021); EuroCup champion (2013); All-EuroCup Second Team (2021); EuroCup assists leader (2021); 4× BBL champion (2008, 2010–2012); BBL Finals MVP (2012); Pro A champion (2019); LBA champion (2018); 4× LKL champion (2007, 2008, 2011, 2012); 5× LKL All-Star (2007, 2009–2012); 2× LKF Cup winner (2007, 2008); French Cup winner (2019); Italian Cup winner (2016); 2× Italian Super Cup winner (2016, 2017); BBL Slam Dunk Champion (2007); LKL Slam Dunk champion (2008); Lithuanian League assists leader (2012); Lithuanian Basketball Player of the Year (2013); 3× EuroBasket assists leader (2013, 2015, 2017)

Other information

Chairman – FK Kauno Žalgiris
- Incumbent
- Assumed office January 2023
- Preceded by: Position established
Medals
Men's basketball
Representing Lithuania
FIBA World Cup
Bronze medal – third place	2010 Turkey
EuroBasket
Silver medal – second place	2013 Slovenia
Silver medal – second place	2015 France–Croatia–Germany–Latvia
FIBA Europe Under-20 Championship
Silver medal – second place	2005 Russia	Team

Mantas Kalnietis (born 6 September 1986) is a Lithuanian former professional basketball player and football executive. He is currently the chairman and co-owner of Toplyga club FK Kauno Žalgiris. He was also a member of the Lithuanian national basketball team. Standing at 6 ft 5 in (1.96 m), he primarily played at the point guard position, but could also play as a shooting guard.

== Early years ==
Kalnietis spent two and a half seasons with the LKKA-Žalgiris. He averaged 17.7 points and 4.3 assists in his second season.

== Professional career ==
Kalnietis made his pro debut in February 2006 with the Žalgiris Kaunas. He averaged 6.8 points on 65 percent shooting in the EuroLeague.

Kalnietis helped Žalgiris win a Baltic League title in 2008, two Lithuanian League titles in 2007 and 2008 and two Lithuanian Cups in 2007 and 2008. He also led the team to a 2007 ULEB Summer League title, where he was named MVP.

He competed at the Reebok Eurocamp in Treviso in 2006 and 2008.

Kalnietis had a breakout season in 2008–09, when he averaged 11.3 points in the Lithuanian League and 8.5 points and 3.0 assists in the EuroLeague. He scored a career-high 20 points in a loss against the Montepaschi Siena on 10 December 2008.

Kalnietis signed a three-year contract with the Benetton Treviso in June 2009. However, because he had another one-year contract with Žalgiris Kaunas, FIBA arbiter's decided that he belonged to Žalgiris. On 27 December 2010, he signed a three-year extension with his hometown club Žalgiris Kaunas. In October 2012, however, he announced that he's interested in playing abroad for the first time in Russia's Lokomotiv Kuban Krasnodar. On 5 October, he signed a three-year contract with the team. On 18 December 2013, Kalnietis was named the Lithuanian Basketball Player of the Year. On 27 April 2015, he parted ways with Lokomotiv.

In July 2015, he joined the Indiana Pacers for the 2015 NBA Summer League. On 17 July 2015, he returned to Žalgiris Kaunas, signing a one-year contract. On 23 January 2016, he left Žalgiris and signed a 1.5-year contract with Olimpia Milano.

On 24 July 2018, Kalnietis signed a one-year contract with ASVEL of the French LNB Pro A.

In 2019, Kalnietis returned to the PBC Lokomotiv Kuban. On 25 October 2020, Kalnietis scored 11 points, grabbed 4 rebounds, dished out 17 assists and broke the VTB United League's all-time record of assists in a single game.

On 21 June 2021, he has signed a two-year contract with Žalgiris Kaunas, where his career had started.

== National team career ==
Kalnietis started at point guard for the Lithuanian national basketball team that finished seventh in the 2006 FIBA World Championship. He averaged 6.0 points and 2.8 assists. He also played at the 2010 FIBA World Championship, as a starter, and won a bronze medal. He played in seven games for Lithuania at the 2012 Summer Olympics, averaging 5.5 points. He led the Lithuanian national team during EuroBasket 2013 to silver medals, averaging 12.1 points and 5 assists per game (the tournament's assist leader). He missed the 2014 FIBA Basketball World Cup, due to a clavicular dislocation, but returned to the national team at EuroBasket 2015. During the same championship, on 7 September, versus the Belgian national team, he achieved the EuroBasket's all-time single-game record of 13 assists, only to be tied days later for the same record by Miloš Teodosić. The Lithuanian national team won their second straight silver medal in 2015, and Kalnietis was once again the tournament's assists leader, with an average of 7.8 assists per game. Furthermore, he dished out 70 assists in total, which is the all-time record of assists for a single EuroBasket. Kalnietis also remained assists leader in EuroBasket 2017, averaging 7.2 per game.

== Career statistics ==
Legend
GP	Games played	GS	Games started	MPG	Minutes per game
FG%	Field-goal percentage	3P%	3-point field-goal percentage	FT%	Free-throw percentage
RPG	Rebounds per game	APG	Assists per game	SPG	Steals per game
BPG	Blocks per game	PPG	Points per game	PIR	Performance index rating
**Bold**	Career high

=== EuroLeague ===
Year	Team	GP	GS	MPG	FG%	3P%	FT%	RPG	APG	SPG	BPG	PPG	PIR
2005–06	Žalgiris	4	1	16.4	**.600**	.333	.333	2.0	2.0	**1.3**	**.5**	6.8	8.5
2006–07	Žalgiris	13	1	12.8	.560	.333	.500	1.2	1.3	.8	.1	4.0	4.2
2007–08	Žalgiris	16	0	7.3	.357	.167	.444	.7	.8	.1	.0	1.6	1.1
2008–09	Žalgiris	10	6	24.6	.420	.310	.727	2.3	3.0	1.2	.2	8.5	7.3
2009–10	Žalgiris	16	16	**30.1**	.483	.275	.800	2.8	3.6	1.0	.2	9.0	10.2
2010–11	Žalgiris	15	7	22.2	.515	.371	.750	2.8	1.9	.2	.1	9.1	8.7
2011–12	Žalgiris	16	12	22.2	.408	.222	.636	2.5	3.7	.6	.1	7.6	7.6
2013–14	Lokomotiv	24	**19**	28.1	.457	.250	.658	**3.0**	**4.8**	1.0	.1	**9.4**	**11.8**
2015–16	Žalgiris	14	12	23.6	.356	.300	.857	2.2	4.1	.7	.1	6.8	5.9
2016–17	Milano	**26**	9	19.4	.435	.368	.667	2.3	2.9	.8	.1	7.2	7.6
2017–18	Milano	20	3	16.3	.367	**.382**	**.905**	1.8	2.1	.5	.1	4.5	4.9
Career		174	86	20.7	.441	.303	.698	2.2	2.9	.7	.1	6.8	7.2

=== EuroCup ===
Year	Team	GP	GS	MPG	FG%	3P%	FT%	RPG	APG	SPG	BPG	PPG	PIR
2012–13†	Lokomotiv	12	10	**33.7**	.493	.298	.500	**2.9**	4.9	.4	**.3**	**13.4**	**14.2**
2014–15	Lokomotiv	5	1	12.8	.412	.286	**1.000**	.8	1.6	.2	.2	3.4	2.0
2015–16	Milano	6	2	22.1	.524	**.389**	.875	1.3	2.3	**1.2**	.2	9.7	9.7
2018–19	ASVEL	**18**	15	25.0	.424	.360	.829	**2.9**	5.7	.9	.1	10.2	13.6
2019–20	Lokomotiv	10	5	24.5	.516	.296	.813	2.3	3.5	.5	.2	6.9	8.7
2020–21	Lokomotiv	**18**	**17**	28.0	**.581**	.379	.760	2.8	**7.1**	.7	.2	8.7	13.4
Career		41	28	25.6	.462	.340	.714	2.4	4.5	.7	.2	10.2	11.8

== State awards ==
- Lithuania: Recipient of the Knight's Cross of the Order of the Lithuanian Grand Duke Gediminas (2010)
- Lithuania: Recipient of the Officer's Cross of the Order for Merits to Lithuania (2013)
