= Jamel McLean =

American basketball player (born 1988)

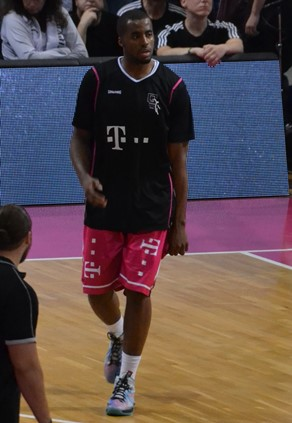
- McLean with Baskets Bonn in 2013

No. 1 – Akita Northern Happinets
- Position: Power forward / center
- League: B.League

Personal information
- Born: April 18, 1988 (age 38) Brooklyn, New York, U.S.
- Listed height: 6 ft 8 in (2.03 m)
- Listed weight: 257 lb (117 kg)

Career information
- High school: Bethel (Hampton, Virginia)
- College: Tulsa (2006–2007); Xavier (2008–2011)
- NBA draft: 2011: undrafted
- Playing career: 2011–present

Career history
- 2011–2012: Leuven Bears
- 2012: Oostende
- 2013–2014: Bonn
- 2014–2015: Alba Berlin
- 2015–2017: Olimpia Milano
- 2017–2018: Olympiacos
- 2018–2019: Lokomotiv Kuban
- 2019–2020: Dinamo Sassari
- 2020: Nagoya Diamond Dolphins
- 2021: MHP Riesen Ludwigsburg
- 2021: Casademont Zaragoza
- 2021–2022: Skyliners Frankfurt
- 2022–2025: Kumamoto Volters
- 2025: Utsunomiya Brex
- 2025–present: Akita Northern Happinets

Career highlights
- Greek All Star Game (2018); LBA champion (2016); 2× Italian Cup winner (2016, 2017); Italian Supercup winner (2016); Bundesliga MVP (2015); All-Bundesliga First Team (2015)

Jamel McLean (born April 18, 1988) is an American professional basketball player. Standing at 6 ft 8 in (2.03 m), he plays at the power forward and center positions.

== Professional career ==
After failing to get drafted at the 2011 NBA draft, Mclean signed with Leuven Bears of Belgium, for the 2011–12 season.

On October 5, 2012, he signed a two-month deal with Telenet Oostende of Belgium. After his contract expired, he left Oostende. On January 5, 2013, he signed with Telekom Baskets Bonn of Germany for the rest of the season. On June 28, 2013, he re-signed with Telekom Bonn for one more season.

On August 5, 2014, McLean signed a one-year contract, with an option for another season, with the German club Alba Berlin. In the 2014–15 season, he was named the Basketball Bundesliga MVP. On July 3, 2015, he opted out of his contract with Alba.

On July 9, 2015, McLean signed a two-year contract with Italian club EA7 Emporio Armani Milano.

On July 12, 2017, McLean signed a two-year contract with Greek club Olympiacos. On June 29, 2018, McLean's agent announced that Olympiacos had opted out of their contract with the player. On July 17, 2018, McLean signed with the Russian team Lokomotiv Kuban.

On August 28, 2019, he signed with Dinamo Sassari of the Italian Lega Basket Serie A.

At mid 2019-20 season McLean resigned from Sassari to move to Japan, where he signed with Nagoya Diamond Dolphins until the end of the season.

On February 22, 2021, McLean signed with MHP Riesen Ludwigsburg of the Basketball Bundesliga for the remainder of the 2020–21 season.

On July 7, 2021, he signed with Casademont Zaragoza of the Liga ACB. McLean averaged 9 points and 4 rebounds per game. He parted ways with the team on November 21.

On November 22, McLean signed with Skyliners Frankfurt of the Basketball Bundesliga.

On July 25, 2022, McLean signed with Kumamoto Volters of the B.League for the 2022–23 season. McLean was injured in the game on October 20, 2022, and placed on the injured list on the 26th. McLean was activated from the injured list on January 5, 2023.

On June 25, 2023, McLean re-signed with the team for the 2023–24 season. Upon renegotiating the contract, McLean changed his jersey number from 3 to 1. After suffering an injury on March 17, McLean was removed from the roster for the remainder of the regular season. He returned for the playoffs, appearing in two games and averaging 28 minutes and 16 seconds per game.

On June 19, 2024, McLean re-signed with the team for the 2024–25 season. McLean was injured in the game on October 19, 2024, and placed on the injured list on the 28th. McLean was activated from the injured list on December 13. Having been placed on the free negotiation player list on May 9, McLean concluded his player contract with the team on June 30, 2025.

== Career statistics ==
Legend
GP	Games played	GS	Games started	MPG	Minutes per game
FG%	Field-goal percentage	3P%	3-point field-goal percentage	FT%	Free-throw percentage
RPG	Rebounds per game	APG	Assists per game	SPG	Steals per game
BPG	Blocks per game	PPG	Points per game	PIR	Performance index rating
**Bold**	Career high

=== Professional League ===
Year	Team	GP	GS	MPG	FG%	3P%	FT%	RPG	APG	SPG	BPG	PPG	PIR
2014–15	Alba Berlin	21	14	25.4	.559	.000	.770	5.6	1.6	1.0	.2	13.0	**16.9**
2015–16	Milano	10	9	22.5	.531	.000	**.830**	4.1	.9	1.0	.1	10.7	13.2
2016–17	Milano	30	9	20.4	.591	.167	.716	4.2	1.4	.7	.25	8.7	10
Career		31	23	24.5	.551	.000	.787	5.1	1.4	1.0	.2	12.3	15.7
2018–19	Lokomotiv Kuban												
2019–20	Nagoya Diamond Dolphins	6	6	**35.1**	.532	.200	.730	**11.2**	2.0	**1.3**	0.2	**18.7**	
2021	MHP Riesen Ludwigsburg												
2021	Casademont Zaragoza												
2021-22	Skyliners Frankfurt												
2022–23	Kumamoto Volters	39	25	26.0	.506	**.319**	.722	7.3	2.2	1.1	.5	16.5	
2023–24	Kumamoto Volters	**48**	**48**	28.0	**.632**	.136	.635	8.9	2.3	**1.3**	**.8**	15.7	
2024–25	Kumamoto Volters	39	3	22.2	.502	.250	.652	7.9	**2.9**	1.0	.5	13.1	
