= Pietro Reverberi =

Italian basketball referee

Personal information
- Born: 28 December 1912 Reggio Emilia, Italy
- Died: 19 February 1985 (aged 72) Reggio Emilia, Italy
- Position: Referee

Career highlights
- FIBA Hall of Fame (2007)
- FIBA Hall of Fame

Pietro Reverberi (28 December 1912 in Reggio Emilia, Italy – 19 February 1985 in Reggio Emilia, Italy) was an Italian basketball referee. He called over 3,000 games in Italy, on different levels of competition. He refereed in the 1952 Summer Olympics, 1956 Summer Olympics, and 1960 Summer Olympics, and in several FIBA World Cups, and EuroBaskets. In 2007, he was enshrined into the FIBA Hall of Fame.

The Premio Reverberi basketball award is named in his honor.
