= Alessandro Gentile =

Italian basketball player (born 1992)

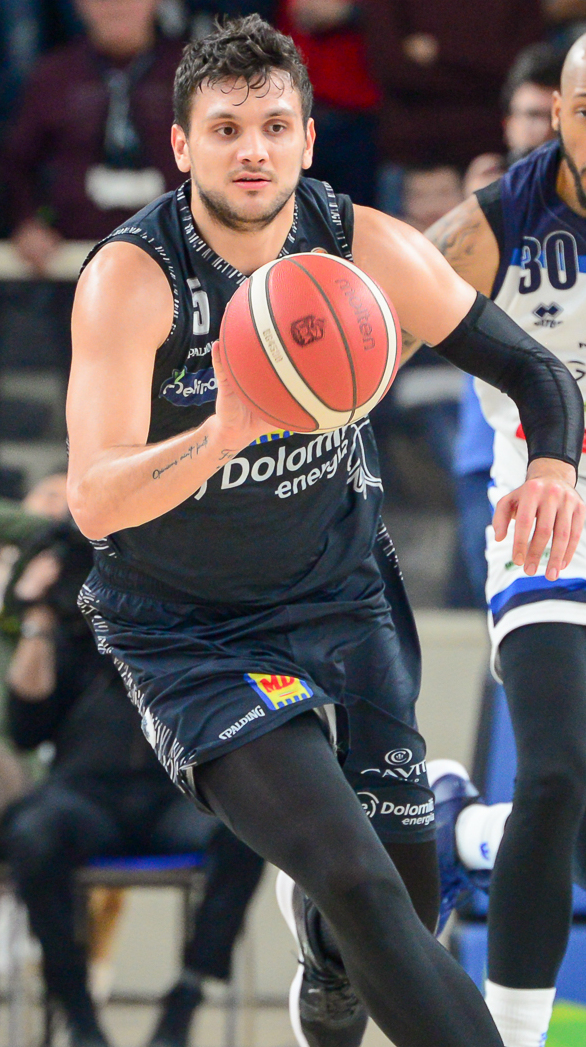
- Gentile in February 2020

No. 5 – Urania Milano
- Position: Shooting guard / small forward
- League: Serie A2

Personal information
- Born: November 12, 1992 (age 34) Maddaloni, Italy
- Listed height: 2.00 m (6 ft 7 in)
- Listed weight: 100 kg (220 lb)

Career information
- NBA draft: 2014: 2nd round, 53rd overall pick
- Drafted by: Minnesota Timberwolves
- Playing career: 2009–present

Career history
- 2009–2011: Benetton Treviso
- 2011–2017: Olimpia Milano
- 2016–2017: →Panathinaikos
- 2017: →Hapoel Jerusalem
- 2017–2018: Virtus Bologna
- 2018–2019: Estudiantes
- 2019–2020: Aquila Trento
- 2020–2021: Estudiantes
- 2021–2022: Varese
- 2022: New Basket Brindisi
- 2022–2023: Udine
- 2023–2024: Scafati
- 2024–present: Urania Milano

Career highlights
- Greek Cup winner (2017); 2× Italian League champion (2014, 2016); Italian Cup winner (2016); Italian Supercup winner (2016); Italian League Finals MVP (2014); 2× Italian League All-Star (2011, 2013); 2× Italian League Best Player Under 22 (2011, 2014); Best Male Italian Player (2014)
- Stats at Basketball Reference
Medals
Men's basketball
Representing Italy
FIBA Europe Under-20 Championship
| Silver medal – second place | 2011 Bilbao |

Alessandro Gentile (born November 12, 1992) is an Italian professional basketball player for Urania Milano of the Serie A2. Standing at 2.01 m (6 ft 7 in), he plays at the shooting guard and small forward positions. He was selected by the Minnesota Timberwolves with the 53rd overall pick in the 2014 NBA draft.

== Professional career ==
=== Early career (2009–2011) ===
From 2007 to 2009, Gentile played with the junior teams of Treviso Basket. In 2009, he signed to play with Treviso's senior men's team and in the 2009–10 season, he played in 24 games in Italy's top-tier level LBA league, averaging 3.4 points and 1.2 rebounds per game. In 2011, he won the Italian League's Best Player Under 22 award. On June 14, 2011, he signed a three-year contract extension with Treviso Basket.

=== Olimpia Milano (2011–2016) ===
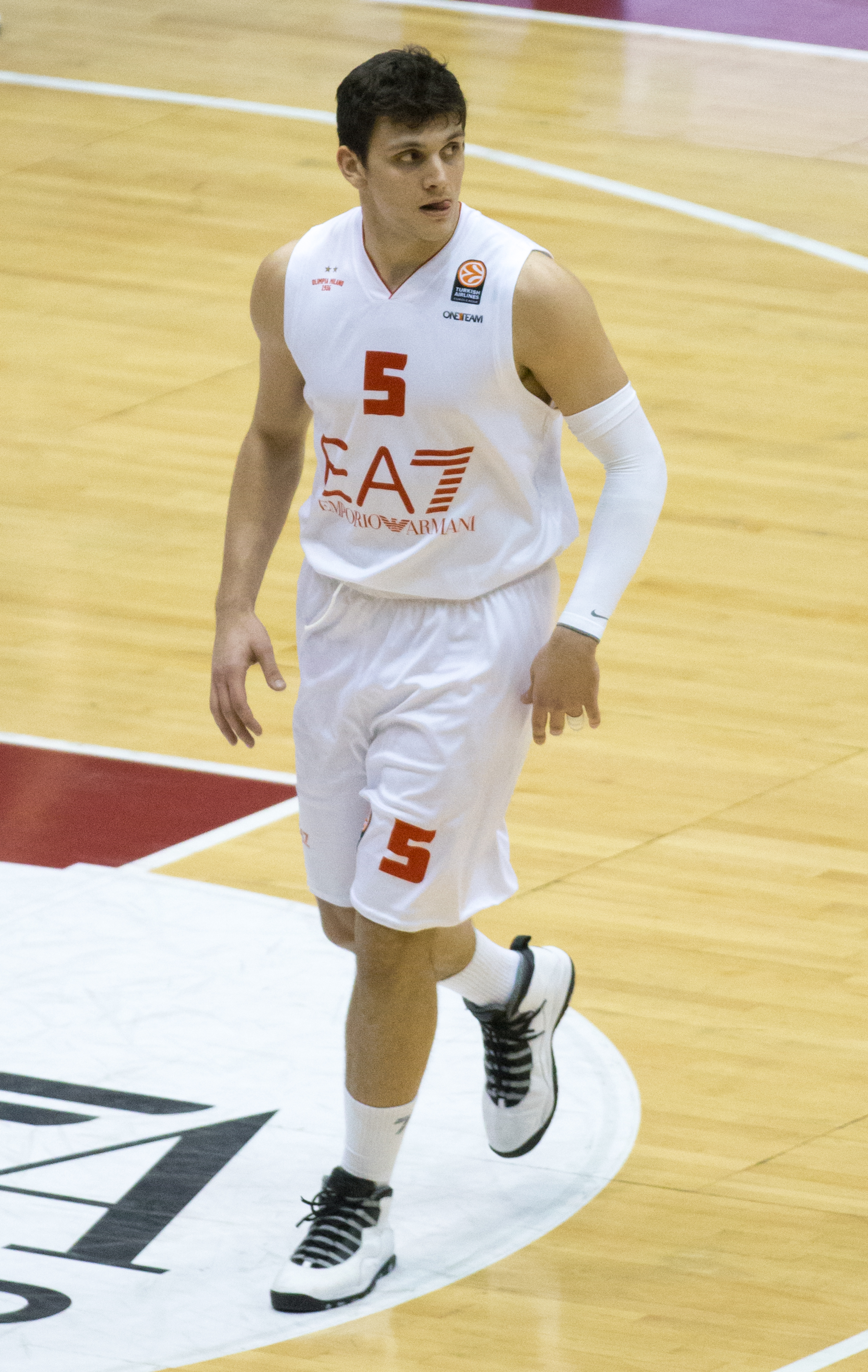
Gentile with Olimpia Milano in the 2013–14 season

In December 2011, Gentile left Treviso Basket and signed a four-year deal with Olimpia Milano. In 2013–14, Gentile had a break-out season, averaging 11.4 points, 2.4 rebounds and 2.3 assists over 21 games in the EuroLeague. In June 2014, after Milano won their 26th Italian League championship, Gentile was named the Italian League Finals MVP.

In July 2014, Gentile penned a new three-year contract with Milano. A year later in 2015, the Milano captain extended his contract until 2018, with a new three-year deal. On October 6, 2015, Gentile played against the NBA's Boston Celtics, in the NBA Global Games tournament.

Gentile was sent on loan to the Greek club Panathinaikos in December 2016. However, Milano retained his rights through the 2017–18 season. He was released by Panathinaikos in March 2017, and he finished the 2016–17 season by playing on loan for Hapoel Jerusalem in the Israeli Super League, and preparing for the upcoming EuroBasket 2017 tournament.

=== Panathinaikos (2016–2017) ===
On December 5, 2016, Gentile reached an agreement with his Italian team, and he left Milano to conclude his season on loan in a non-Italian team. On December 19, 2016, Gentile then joined the Greek club Panathinaikos, on a loan from Olimpia Milano, for the rest of the season. He was with Panathinaikos, as they won the 2017 Greek Cup Final against Aris.

He was then released by Panathinaikos in March 2017. With Panathinaikos, he averaged 3.2 points, 2.2 rebounds, 0.6 assists, and 0.3 steals per game with them in the EuroLeague, and 5.8 points, 2.5 rebounds, 1.6 assists, and 0.6 steals per game in the Greek Basket League.

=== Hapoel Jerusalem (2017) ===
On April 3, 2017, Gentile signed with the Israeli club Hapoel Jerusalem, of the Israeli Super League for the remainder of the Israeli Super League 2016–17 season. However, he was released by the club before their season ended. In 8 games with the club (6 regular season games and 2 playoff games), he averaged 4.3 points, 2.0 rebounds, and 0.8 assists per game.

=== Virtus Bologna (2017–2018) ===
On July 18, 2017, Gentile signed with Italian club Virtus Bologna, for the 2017–18 season.

=== Movistar Estudiantes (2018–2019) ===
On October 30, 2018, Gentile signed a one-year deal with Spanish club Movistar Estudiantes.

=== Aquila Basket Trento (2019–2020) ===
On September 26, 2019, he signed with Aquila Basket Trento of the Italian Lega Basket Serie A (LBA).

=== Movistar Estudiantes (2020–2021) ===
On September 29, 2020, he signed a three-month deal with Movistar Estudiantes, returning to the Liga ACB.

=== Pallacanestro Varese (2021–2022) ===
On June 25, 2021, Gentile signed with Pallacanestro Varese of the Italian Lega Basket Serie A (LBA). He averaged 14.8 points and 4.9 rebounds per game. On January 27, 2022, Gentile parted ways with the team.

=== New Basket Brindisi (2022) ===
On January 28, 2022, he signed with New Basket Brindisi of the Lega Basket Serie A.

=== NBA draft rights ===
On June 26, 2014, Gentile was selected with the 53rd overall pick in the 2014 NBA draft by the Minnesota Timberwolves. His NBA draft rights were later traded to the Houston Rockets on draft night.

On August 19, 2018，Gentile was reported to have intention to join the Houston Rockets, but no news was announced since then. Later Gentile was waived by Houston Rockets on October 12.

== National team career ==
Gentile started in the youth age categories of Italy's junior national teams, first for the Under-16's at the 2008 FIBA Europe Under-16 Championship, and then notably winning the silver medal with the Under-20s at the 2011 FIBA Europe Under-20 Championship.

Gentile then became a member of the senior men's Italian national basketball team. He played with Italy at EuroBasket 2013 and EuroBasket 2015. He also played at the Turin 2016 FIBA World Olympic Qualifying Tournament.

== Career statistics ==
Legend
| GP | Games played | GS | Games started | MPG | Minutes per game |
| FG% | Field-goal percentage | 3P% | 3-point field-goal percentage | FT% | Free-throw percentage |
| RPG | Rebounds per game | APG | Assists per game | SPG | Steals per game |
| BPG | Blocks per game | PPG | Points per game | PIR | Performance index rating |
| **Bold** | Career high |

=== EuroLeague ===
| Year | Team | GP | GS | MPG | FG% | 3P% | FT% | RPG | APG | SPG | BPG | PPG | PIR |
|---|---|---|---|---|---|---|---|---|---|---|---|---|---|
| 2011–12 | Milano | 7 | 5 | 17.5 | .286 | .267 | **1.000** | 1.9 | 1.1 | .1 | .3 | 4.6 | .4 |
| 2012–13 | Milano | 8 | 0 | 12.6 | .439 | **.400** | .800 | 1.4 | .9 | .4 | .3 | 6.3 | 3.5 |
| 2013–14 | Milano | **21** | 16 | 25.0 | .443 | .333 | .641 | 2.4 | 2.3 | .8 | .1 | 11.4 | 8.6 |
| 2014–15 | Milano | 20 | **16** | 27.5 | .429 | .306 | .777 | 3.0 | 2.5 | .7 | .0 | 14.3 | 11.5 |
| 2015–16 | Milano | 6 | 6 | **30.1** | .449 | .280 | .714 | **3.5** | **4.2** | 1.0 | **1.0** | **20.0** | **19.3** |
| 2016–17 | Milano | 9 | 8 | 22.9 | **.458** | .214 | .563 | 3.0 | 2.4 | **1.1** | .3 | 10.8 | 9.4 |
| 2016–17 | Panathinaikos | 9 | 8 | 13.2 | .342 | .200 | .222 | 2.2 | 0.6 | 0.3 | .2 | 3.2 | 1.8 |
| Career | | 80 | 59 | 22.5 | .427 | .307 | .690 | 2.6 | 2.1 | .7 | .2 | 10.7 | 8.2 |

== Personal ==
Gentile is the son of the Italian basketball icon Nando Gentile. He is also the younger brother of Italian professional basketball player Stefano Gentile. Alessandro moved around Italy and Europe, following his father during his playing career. Along with his older brother Stefano, he played with the youth teams of Panathinaikos in Greece, while his father played with the club's senior team. He has played with his brother in the senior Italian national team and Virtus Bologna.

== Awards and honors ==
=== Pro clubs ===
- 2× Serie A (Italian League) champion: 2014, 2016
- Italian Cup winner: 2016
- Italian Supercup winner: 2016
- Greek Cup winner: 2017

=== Italian junior national team ===
- FIBA Europe Under-20 Championship:
  - 2011 Bilbao: Silver

=== Individual ===
- 2× Serie A All-Star: 2011, 2013
- 2× Serie A Best Player Under 22: 2011, 2014
- Serie A Finals MVP: 2014
- Premio Reverberi: 2014 (Best Male Italian Player)
