= Krunoslav Simon =

Croatian basketball player (born 1985)

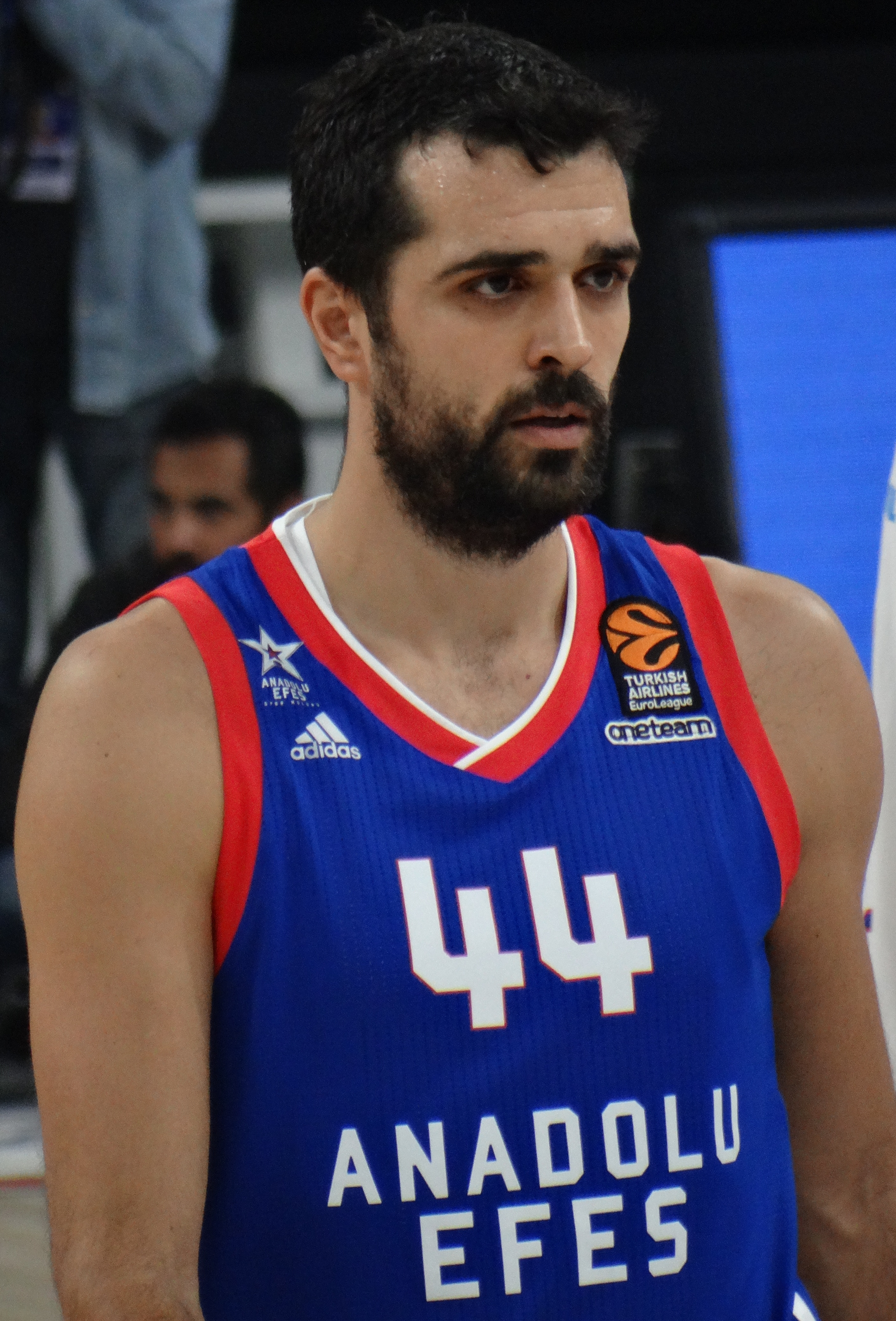
- Simon with Anadolu Efes in 2017

Croatia men's national basketball team
- Title: Sporting director

Personal information
- Born: 24 June 1985 (age 41) Zagreb, SR Croatia, SFR Yugoslavia
- Listed height: 1.97 m (6 ft 6 in)
- Listed weight: 100 kg (220 lb)

Career information
- NBA draft: 2007: undrafted
- Playing career: 2002–2025
- Position: Shooting guard / small forward

Career history
- 2002–2012: Zagreb
- 2012–2013: Unicaja Málaga
- 2013–2015: Lokomotiv Kuban
- 2015–2017: Olimpia Milano
- 2017–2022: Anadolu Efes
- 2022–2023: Cedevita Junior
- 2023–2025: Samobor

Career highlights
- 2× EuroLeague champion (2021, 2022); Croatian League champion (2011); Italian League champion (2016); 2× Turkish League champion (2019, 2021); 3× Croatian Cup winner (2008, 2010, 2011); 2× Italian Cup winner (2016, 2017); 2× Turkish Cup winner (2018, 2022); Italian Supercup winner (2016); 2× Turkish Super Cup winner (2018, 2019); Italian Supercup MVP (2016); Turkish Cup Final MVP (2018); Turkish Super Cup MVP (2019); No. 44 retired by Efes (2022)
Medals
Men's basketball
Representing Croatia
Mediterranean Games
Gold medal – first place	2009 Italy

Krunoslav Simon (born 24 June 1985) is a Croatian basketball executive and former professional player. Standing at a height of 1.97 m (6 ft 5 1/2 in), he played at the shooting guard and small forward positions. He currently serves as a sporting director for the Croatian Basketball Federation.

== Professional career ==
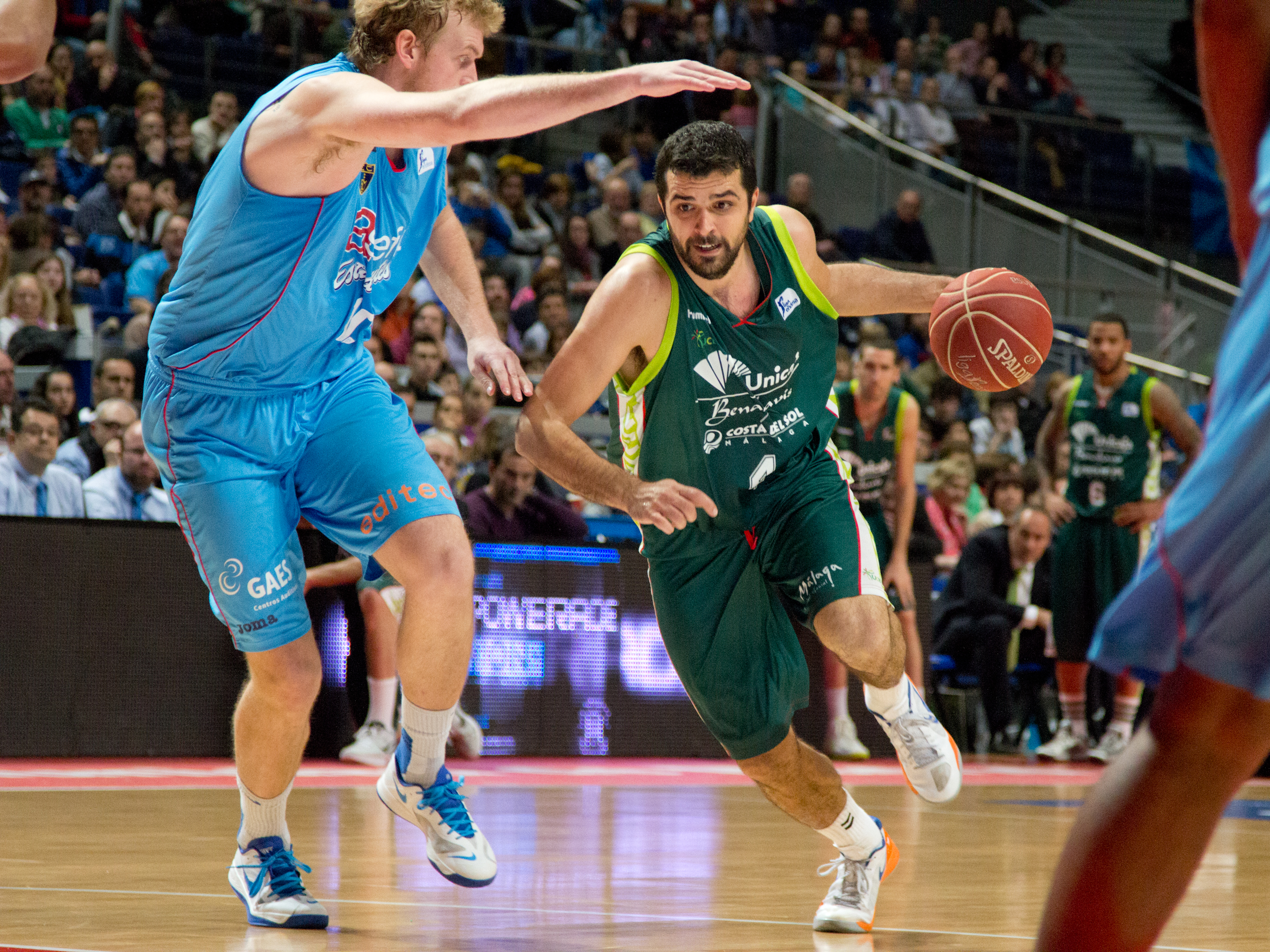
Simon while playing for Unicaja in 2013

After spending his youth years in KK Maksimir and KK Zrinjevac, Simon joined KK Zagreb in 1998, and he played there until 2012, when he signed with Unicaja Málaga of the Spanish League. On 25 June 2013 Simon signed a two-year deal with Lokomotiv Kuban.

On 22 July 2015 Simon signed a one-year contract with the Italian club EA7 Emporio Armani Milano. On 11 July 2016 he signed a two-year contract extension with Milano.

=== Anadolu Efes ===
On 9 July 2017 Simon signed a two-year contract with the Turkish club Anadolu Efes, with second year being optional. In 2017–18 season, he won the Turkish Basketball Cup with the club and was named the Turkish Basketball Cup Final MVP. In 26 appearances in the 2017–18 EuroLeague, he averaged 9.2 points, 3.9 rebounds and 3.4 assists per game.

In 2018–19 season, Simon improved his shooting accuracy from the field, as he averaged 9.4 points over 37 games in the 2018–19 EuroLeague with 48.3% shooting from the field. Anadolu Efes made its first appearance in the EuroLeague Final Four where they lost to the CSKA Moscow in the final game.

On 24 May 2019 Simon signed a two-year contract extension with Anadolu Efes. He signed another two-year (1+1) contract extension with the team on 20 July 2020.

On 8 July 2022, Simon parted ways with Anadolu Efes after five successful seasons together. The Turkish club also announced that they would retire the Croatian player's #44 jersey.

== National team career ==
Simon debuted with the senior Croatian national team at the 2011 EuroBasket. He also represented Croatia at the 2013 EuroBasket, 2015 EuroBasket, 2017 EuroBasket and 2022 EuroBasket. He also represented Croatia at the 2014 FIBA World Cup and the 2016 Summer Olympics.

== Career statistics ==
Legend
GP	Games played	GS	Games started	MPG	Minutes per game
FG%	Field-goal percentage	3P%	3-point field-goal percentage	FT%	Free-throw percentage
RPG	Rebounds per game	APG	Assists per game	SPG	Steals per game
BPG	Blocks per game	PPG	Points per game	PIR	Performance index rating
**Bold**	Career high

=== EuroLeague ===
†	Denotes season in which Simon won the EuroLeague
*	Led the league

Year	Team	GP	GS	MPG	FG%	3P%	FT%	RPG	APG	SPG	BPG	PPG	PIR
2011–12	Zagreb	10	10	**30.2**	.429	.295	**.962**	**4.6**	2.5	.7	.0	**13.4**	12.6
2012–13	Málaga	22	17	24.9	.391	.380	.885	3.3	2.5	.4	.1	10.0	8.8
2013–14	Lokomotiv	23	14	25.0	.422	.351	.800	3.3	2.6	**1.0**	**.3**	10.6	11.6
2015–16	Milano	10	4	26.5	.444	.271	.704	4.0	2.8	.6	**.3**	10.7	9.3
2016–17	Milano	21	9	27.6	.451	.370	.875	3.6	**3.9**	**1.0**	.2	11.0	**12.7**
2017–18	Anadolu Efes	26	22	28.2	.384	.339	.818	3.9	3.4	.8	.2	9.2	9.5
2018–19	Anadolu Efes	**37***	22	24.8	.483	.403	.843	3.8	2.8	.9	.2	9.4	11.9
2019–20	Anadolu Efes	27	13	23.3	.479	**.440**	.857	3.9	2.9	.6	.2	8.9	10.9
2020–21†	Anadolu Efes	35	**28**	25.6	**.486**	.403	.769	3.1	3.3	.5	**.3**	10.3	12.2
2021–22†	Anadolu Efes	27	13	21.2	.417	.274	.926	2.8	2.6	.5	.1	6.9	7.7
Career		238	155	25.3	.437	.367	.838	3.5	2.9	.7	.2	9.7	10.8

=== National team ===
Year	Competition	GP	GS	MPG	FG%	3P%	FT%	RPG	APG	SPG	BPG	PPG
2011	EuroBasket	5	5	23.0	.450	.267	.625	3.6	1.8	.6	.0	9.0
2013	EuroBasket	**11**	**11**	23.8	.461	.447	.786	3.8	2.1	.1	.2	9.3
2014	FIBA Basketball World Cup	6	6	**28.2**	.333	.367	.750	4.2	2.3	**1.0**	**.5**	9.5
2015	EuroBasket	6	6	24.5	**.542**	**.542**	.850	4.7	3.7	.8	.0	**13.7**
2016	Olympic Games	6	6	25.5	.294	.333	**1.000**	**5.3**	**4.3**	.8	.0	8.8
2017	EuroBasket	6	2	20.5	.367	.200	**1.000**	4.0	4.0	.7	.0	4.3
2022	EuroBasket	6	1	22.1	.512	.375	.833	3.8	3.0	.5	**.5**	8.8
