= Giovanni Severini =

Italian basketball player (born 1993)

Free Agent
- Position: Shooting guard

Personal information
- Born: April 23, 1993 (age 33) Macerata, Italy
- Listed height: 1.97 m (6 ft 6 in)
- Listed weight: 85 kg (187 lb)

Career information
- NBA draft: 2015: undrafted
- Playing career: 2009–present

Career history
- 2009–2012: Montepaschi Siena
- 2012–2013: → Pallacanestro Chieti
- 2013–2014: → Pallacanestro Firenze
- 2014–2017: Sidigas Avellino
- 2017–2018: Pallacanestro Forlì 2.015
- 2018–2021: Scaligera Verona
- 2021–2025: Pallacanestro Cantù

Career highlights
- 3× Serie A champion (2010–2012); 3× Italian Cup winner (2010–2012); 2× Italian Supercup winner (2010–2011)

Giovanni Severini (born April 23, 1993) is an Italian professional basketball player who last played for Pallacanestro Cantù of the Italian Serie A2.

== Career statistics ==
=== Lega Basket Serie A ===
Year	Team	GP	GS	MPG	FG%	3P%	FT%	RPG	APG	SPG	BPG	PPG
2009–10	Siena	1	0	1	.0	.0	.0	.0	.0	.0	.0	.0
2010–11	Siena	4	0	1.7	.333	1.000	.0	.0	.0	.0	.0	.7
2011–12	Siena	1	0	1	.0	.0	.0	.0	.0	.0	.0	.0
2014–15	Avellino	3	0	1	.0	.0	.0	.3	.0	.0	.0	.0
2015–16	Avellino	21	1	4.5	.263	.250	.500	.5	.1	.2	.0	.6
Career		30	1	3.6	.171	.300	.250	.4	.1	.1	.0	0.5
