= Stefano Sacripanti =

Italian basketball coach (born 1970)

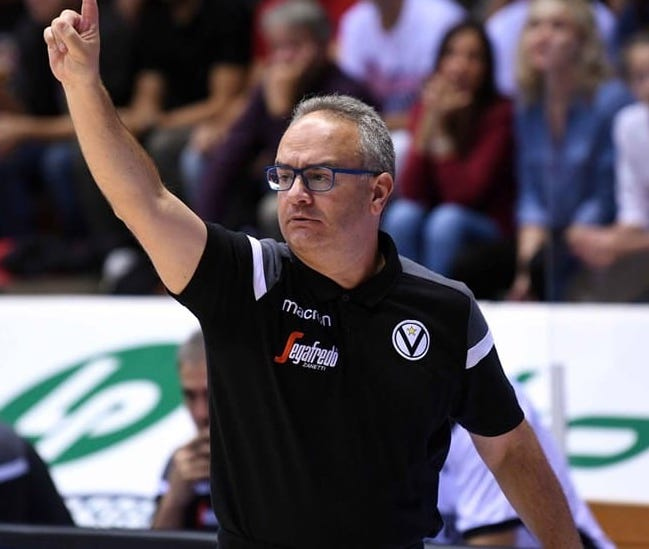

Victoria Libertas Pesaro
- Position: Head coach
- League: Lega Basket Serie A

Personal information
- Born: 15 May 1970 (age 56) Cantù, Italy
- Listed height: 6 ft 0 in (1.83 m)
- Listed weight: 175 lb (79 kg)

Career history

Coaching
- 2000–2007: Pallacanestro Cantù
- 2001–2009: Italian NT
- 2006–present: Italy U-20
- 2007–2009: Victoria Libertas Pesaro
- 2009–2013: Juvecaserta
- 2013–2015: Pallacanestro Cantù
- 2015–2018: Sidigas Avellino
- 2018–2019: Virtus Bologna
- 2019–2022: Napoli
- 2023–2024: Scafati
- 2024–present: Victoria Libertas Pesaro

Career highlights
- As coach: Italian League Best Coach (2002); Italian Supercup (2004)
Medals
Men's basketball
Head Coach for Italy
FIBA Europe Under-20 Championship
Bronze medal – third place	2007 Slovenia/Italy	National Team
Silver medal – second place	2011 Spain	National Team
Gold medal – first place	2013 Estonia	National Team

Stefano "Pino" Sacripanti (born 15 May 1970 in Cantù, Italy) is an Italian professional basketball coach, he is the current head coach for Victoria Libertas Pesaro of the Italian Lega Basket Serie A (LBA).

== Coaching career ==
He is the coach of the Italian men's national under-20 basketball team since 2006 and led them to the bronze medal at the 2007 FIBA Europe Under-20 Championship, the silver medal at the 2011 FIBA Europe Under-20 Championship and the gold medal at the 2013 FIBA Europe Under-20 Championship.

His first time as a head coach was with Pallacanestro Cantù in 2000.

Since 2015 is the coach of the Italian basketball team Sidigas Avellino.

On 1 June 2018 Sacripanti left Sidigas Avellino after three years.

On 12 June 2018 Sacripanti became new head coach of Segafredo Virtus Bologna.

On June 4, 2024, he signed with Victoria Libertas Pesaro of the Italian Lega Basket Serie A (LBA).
