= Salvatore Parlato =

Italian basketball player (born 1986)

No. 57 – Sidigas Avellino
- Position: Guard
- League: LBA; Champions League

Personal information
- Born: 28 August 1986 (age 40) Avellino, Italy
- Listed height: 1.96 m (6 ft 5 in)
- Listed weight: 83 kg (183 lb)

Career information
- Playing career: 2003–present

Career history
- 2003–2006: Felice Scandone
- 2006–2007: Folgore Nocera
- 2007–2008: Delta Salerno
- 2008–2009: Basket Sarno
- 2009–2010: Magic Team Benevento
- 2010–2011: Delta Salerno
- 2011–2012: Basket Venafro
- 2012–2013: Delta Salerno
- 2013–2014: Benevento
- 2014–2015: Scafati
- 2015–present: Felice Scandone

Salvatore Parlato (born 28 August 1986) is an Italian basketball player for Sidigas Avellino of the Lega Basket Serie A (LBA). Standing at 1.96 m (6 ft 5 in), he usually plays as guard.

== Professional career ==
On 7 December 2016, at age 30, Parlato scored 5 points in a Basketball Champions League game versus Mega Leks, which were his first points in a European competition.
