= Milan Mačvan =

Serbian politician and former basketball player

Milan Mačvan Милан Мачван
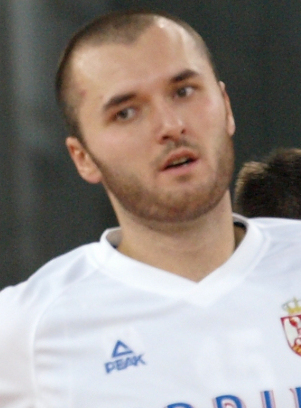

Personal details
- Born: 16 November 1989 (age 36) Vukovar, SR Croatia, SFR Yugoslavia
- Basketball career

Personal information
- Listed height: 2.06 m (6 ft 9 in)
- Listed weight: 107 kg (236 lb)

Career information
- NBA draft: 2011: 2nd round, 54th overall pick
- Drafted by: Cleveland Cavaliers
- Playing career: 2007–2020
- Position: Power forward
- Number: 12, 13, 25

Career history
- 2007: FMP
- 2007–2010: Hemofarm
- 2010–2012: Maccabi Tel Aviv
- 2011–2012: →Partizan
- 2012–2014: Galatasaray
- 2014–2015: Partizan
- 2015–2017: Olimpia Milano
- 2017–2019: Bayern Munich
- 2019–2020: Alvark Tokyo

Career highlights
- Italian League champion (2016); Turkish League champion (2013); Serbian League champion (2012); Israeli League champion (2011); 2× German League champion (2018, 2019); German Cup winner (2018); 2× Italian Cup winner (2016, 2017); Serbian Cup winner (2012); Israeli Cup winner (2011); Italian Supercup winner (2016); FIBA Asia Champions Cup winner (2019); Serbian League Playoffs MVP (2015); EuroCup Rising Star (2009); All-ABA League Team (2015); FIBA Under-19 World Cup MVP (2007); Nike Hoop Summit MVP (2009); Best Young Athlete of Serbia (2007)
- Stats at Basketball Reference
Medals
Men's basketball
Representing Serbia
Summer Olympics
Silver medal – second place	2016 Rio de Janeiro	Team
EuroBasket
Silver medal – second place	2009 Poland
Silver medal – second place	2017 Finland–Israel–Romania–Turkey
Universiade
Gold medal – first place	2009 Belgrade	Team
FIBA Europe Under-20 Championship
Gold medal – first place	2008 Latvia	Team
FIBA Under-19 World Cup
Gold medal – first place	2007 Serbia	Team
FIBA Europe Under-18 Championship
Gold medal – first place	2007 Spain	Team

Milan Mačvan (Serbian: Милан Мачван; born 16 November 1989) is a Serbian former professional basketball player. Standing at 2.06 m (6 ft 9 in), he played at the power forward position. He also represented the Serbian national basketball team internationally. He was selected by the Cleveland Cavaliers with the 54th overall pick in the 2011 NBA draft.

== Early life and career ==
Born to a professional basketball player father who had been playing for KK Borovo Vukovar in the First B Federal League (second-tier basketball league in Yugoslavia), infant Mačvan fled the town of his birth with his mother for Novi Sad due to the disintegration of SFR Yugoslavia and the outbreak of war in SR Croatia. The family soon returned to Vukovar where the youngster took up organized youth basketball at KK Borovo at age 5 but shortly following the war moved back to Serbia, settling in Bačka Palanka.

After being noticed by coach Milovan Bulatović at a basketball camp in Požarevac, fourteen-year-old Mačvan joined the FMP youth system in 2004. Initially coached by Bulatović, the teenager kept progressing within the FMP youth ranks—moving to the next age group, under-19, coached by Slobodan Klipa.

Before even getting an opportunity to play full squad basketball at FMP, Mačvan started turning heads via successful appearances at junior and cadet European and World championships as part of the Serbian national youth teams.

== Club career ==
=== FMP ===
In fall 2007, ahead of the 2007–08 season, having passed through multiple youth system age groups at KK FMP, the 17-year-old was attached to FMP's full squad under head coach Vlada Vukoičić. He appeared in five Adriatic League games for them before transferring to KK Hemofarm in mid-December 2007.

=== Hemofarm ===
Mačvan did not have a professional contract during his time at Železnik due to being underage; however, once he turned eighteen in November 2007, he turned down the option of signing one at Železnik and somewhat surprisingly chose to do so with rival KK Hemofarm, which paid Železnik a €150,000 transfer fee for his services. The biggest reason behind his decision to sign with Hemofarm rather than remain with Železnik was wanting to be with Hemofarm's head coach Miroslav Nikolić who had also coached Mačvan in the Serbia under-19 team that won the 2007 FIBA Under-19 World Championship.

Signing a four-year contract with Hemofarm on 18 December 2007, Mačvan joined a young squad featuring talented 19-year-olds Stefan Marković, Boban Marjanović, and Petar Despotović. A couple of months later, during spring 2008, coach Nikolić resigned his post at Hemofarm after a string of poor results, and the club brought in Vlada Vukoičić, Mačvan's coach at Železnik, who had gotten fired there in the meantime.

On 11 April 2009, 19-year-old Mačvan appeared at the 2009 Nike Hoop Summit game at Portland's Rose Garden alongside prospects such as Donatas Motiejūnas, Nikos Pappas, and Kevin Séraphin. Playing on Team World, they faced Team USA featuring Xavier Henry, John Henson, John Wall, Avery Bradley, and Mason Plumlee. Mačvan was the game's MVP with 23 points, 14 rebounds, and 6 assists leading the World team to their first win over the USA team since 1998.

=== Maccabi Tel Aviv ===
On 17 December 2010, Mačvan signed a five-year contract with EuroLeague contenders Maccabi Tel Aviv. Macvan played at the 2010–11 EuroLeague Final, Scoring 3 points and grabbing 4 rebounds in 12 minutes.

==== Loan to Partizan ====
On 18 October 2011, Mačvan signed a one-year loan deal with KK Partizan. Over 10 EuroLeague games, he averaged career-high 15.3 points and 8.2 rebounds per game.

=== Galatasaray ===
On 30 July 2012, Mačvan signed two-year contract with Turkish team Galatasaray Medical Park who also competed in the EuroLeague. Mačvan's former club Maccabi Tel Aviv received a €250,000 transfer fee from Galatasaray for the player's services.

=== Return to Partizan ===
On 17 October 2014, Mačvan signed a contract with his former club KK Partizan until the end of season.

=== Olimpia Milano ===
On 15 July 2015, Mačvan signed a two-year contract with the Italian club EA7 Emporio Armani Milano. In November 2015, he broke his right hand, and was expected to miss six weeks of action.

=== Bayern Munich ===
On 21 July 2017, Mačvan signed a two-year deal with German club Bayern Munich.

=== Alvark Tokyo ===
In July 2019, Mačvan signed for Alvark Tokyo of the Japanese B.League.

On 1 June 2020, Mačvan announced his retirement from his basketball career at age 31.

== Career statistics ==
Legend
GP	Games played	GS	Games started	MPG	Minutes per game
FG%	Field-goal percentage	3P%	3-point field-goal percentage	FT%	Free-throw percentage
RPG	Rebounds per game	APG	Assists per game	SPG	Steals per game
BPG	Blocks per game	PPG	Points per game	PIR	Performance index rating
**Bold**	Career high

=== EuroLeague ===
Year	Team	GP	GS	MPG	FG%	3P%	FT%	RPG	APG	SPG	BPG	PPG	PIR
2010–11	Maccabi	12	1	9.0	.438	.200	.813	1.7	.4	.2	**.3**	3.5	3.6
2011–12	Partizan	10	**9**	**31.6**	**.558**	**.375**	.833	**8.2**	**2.2**	**1.0**	.1	**15.3**	**15.8**
2013–14	Galatasaray	**26**	6	19.5	.476	.325	.759	4.5	1.0	.3	**.3**	6.8	9.3
2015–16	Milano	6	4	20.0	.463	.364	**.900**	4.3	2.0	.8	.0	10.0	14.0
2016–17	Milano	28	24	22.2	.534	.375	.795	4.4	1.4	.4	.0	8.4	10.0
**Career**		86	44	19.4	.498	.341	.806	4.6	1.2	.4	.2	8.0	9.8

== National team career ==
=== Youth level ===
Even before getting the first-team action on the club level with FMP, Mačvan began playing international competitions for Serbian national youth teams.

In 2007, 17-year-old Mačvan had a busy and successful summer. First, in mid-July, he led the Serbian under-19 team to victory at the Under-19 World Cup in Novi Sad, earning the MVP honours in the process. In the final, Serbia defeated the United States team featuring Stephen Curry and DeAndre Jordan. Then, only ten days later, Mačvan was included by head coach Dejan Mijatović on the Serbian under-18 team, leading it to gold at the Under-18 European Championship in Madrid, with a team-best 19.3 points and 10.3 rebounds per game over 8 games. For his efforts, at the end of 2007, Mačvan received the Golden Badge Award as the Best Young Athlete of the Year in Serbia given by Sport newspaper.

In early August 2008, 18-year-old Mačvan played for the Serbian under-20 team at the 2008 FIBA Europe Under-20 Championship in Riga, Latvia. Coached by Slobodan Klipa, this time around, Mačvan's stats weren't as dominant as the duo of Miroslav Raduljica and Marko Kešelj took over the leading roles in the beginning stages of the tournament. However, as the matches progressed, Mačvan started regaining top form and made a huge contribution in the final versus Lithuania, leading the team with 31 points. He finished the tournament with 16.9 points and 6.6 rebounds per game over 8 games.

=== Senior level ===
==== EuroBasket 2009 ====
In late summer 2009, coming off a great club season at Hemofarm as well as helping Serbia win the 2009 Universiade tournament on home soil in early July, Mačvan made the Serbian national team 12-man roster head coach Dušan Ivković took to EuroBasket 2009 in Poland. Being on a young squad whose oldest members were 26-year-olds Bojan Popović and Nenad Krstić, 19-year-old Mačvan was the squad's youngest player.

Despite the player's youth and inexperience at the big stage, coach Ivković gave Mačvan decent minutes off the bench at his major tournament debut game versus world champions, Olympic silver medalists, and EuroBasket runners-up Spain that Serbia surprisingly won 66-57 while Mačvan contributed with 8 points and 3 rebounds in 17 minutes of action, hitting two clutch three-pointers in the third quarter, incidentally his only field goals of the contest. The group stage continued with a loss versus Slovenia and this time Mačvan got 18 minutes backing up Novica Veličković at the power forward position as his scoring output dropped off to 4 points.

In the second group stage outings — wins against host Poland followed by a loss to Turkey — Mačvan's playing time decreased, before getting a slight bump versus Lithuania in the closing group stage contest while his scoring contribution became almost negligible.

At the first single-elimination stage, quarterfinal win versus Russia, the youngster's game saw a slight boost with 5 points, though this was followed by a complete omission in the hard-fought semifinal overtime win versus Slovenia as Ivković preferred the more experienced Veličković. In the final the next day, tired and emotionally spent Serbian team lost big to Spain with young Mačvan getting little opportunity to play.

Mačvan played at the 2010 FIBA World Championship in Turkey, and at the EuroBasket 2011 in Lithuania.

In early July 2013, despite receiving a call-up for EuroBasket 2013, twenty-three-year-old Mačvan didn't show up at the Serbian national team training camp. Asked by the Serbian media about the reasons for Mačvan not being there, head coach Ivković said he didn't know them and revealed that the "coaching staff's attempts to reach the player in order to see what's going on were unsuccessful". As a result of Mačvan's failure to show up, Ivković decided to make two subsequent call-ups, to 20-year-old Nemanja Krstić and 21-year-old Nikola Kalinić both of whom went on to make the final 12-man roster and make their competitive debuts for the national team.

In early June 2014, the national team's newly appointed head coach Saša Đorđević announced Mačvan alongside 28 other individuals on the preliminary list of players he was considering for the 12 final roster spots at the 2014 FIBA World Cup. On 1 July, announcing the official call-ups for the start of the training camp, Đorđević crossed out 9 names from the preliminary list including Mačvan's, saying the 24-year-old got excluded for tactical reasons while adding he had "an unfocused season [at Galatasaray] without a specific position". Two days later when Novica Veličković, one of the 20 players who received call-ups, announced he wouldn't be showing up to training camp due to knee injury, agitated Đorđević criticized him in the media: "I'm blindsided and disappointed by Veličković's unfair move. We've been in constant contact before the call-up list had been announced and not once did he mention anything about an injury... More than anything else he owes an explanation to Duško Savanović and Milan Mačvan, two players that weren't called-up because I gave Veličković the advantage over them. If you're wondering if I'll now be calling-up either Savanović or Mačvan, I won't be. My face is way too red in front of them over this to do that now".

==== 2016 Olympics ====
In mid June 2016, shortly after getting a national team call-up ahead of the Olympic Qualifying Tournament, Mačvan broke his pinky toe, an injury that required a cast. The injury prevented him from taking part in the Qualifying Tournament at home in Belgrade that Serbia managed to win and qualify for the Olympics. Despite the injury, national team head coach Đorđević did not write Mačvan off; instead waiting for his injury to heal and eventually picking the power forward for the final 12-man squad taken to the Olympics.

Mačvan represented Serbia at the 2016 Summer Olympics where they won the silver medal, after losing to the United States in the final game with 96–66.

==== EuroBasket 2017 ====
Mačvan also represented and captained Serbia at the EuroBasket 2017 where they won the silver medal, after losing in the final game to Slovenia. Over 9 tournament games, he averaged 10.8 points, 4 rebounds and 2.7 assists per game.

== Post-playing career ==
On 6 August 2020, the KK Partizan announced that they had hired Mačvan as a sporting advisor to the club president. In November 2020, he left his KK Partizan post.

Mačvan has been producing hazelnuts since 2016, then cherries, and then entered the world of tillage.

== Personal life ==
Mačvan was born in Vukovar, into an ethnic Serb family. At three years of age (1992–93), together with his family, he left the war-stricken Vukovar for Serbia, living in Novi Sad with his mother for a period. At six years of age, he returned briefly to Vukovar, where he started playing organized basketball with KK Vukovar. The family then moved to Bačka Palanka in northern Serbia.

His family has the slava (feast day) of Miholjdan (St. Cyriacus the Anchorite) 12 October, and he has said that he believes in God and goes to church. He has a younger sister, Jelena (born 1995), who briefly played volleyball.

== See also ==
- List of Olympic medalists in basketball
- Cleveland Cavaliers draft history

Awards
Preceded by Ivan Lenđer	The Best Young Athlete of Serbia; 2007	Succeeded by Ivana Španović
Sporting positions
Preceded by Miloš Teodosić	Serbia captain 2017	Succeeded by Miroslav Raduljica
