= Marques Green =

American-born naturalized Macedonian professional basketball player

Free agent
- Position: Point guard

Personal information
- Born: March 18, 1982 (age 44) Norristown, Pennsylvania, U.S.
- Listed height: 5 ft 6 in (1.68 m)
- Listed weight: 160 lb (73 kg)

Career information
- High school: Norristown (Norristown, Pennsylvania)
- College: St. Bonaventure (2000–2004)
- NBA draft: 2004: undrafted
- Playing career: 2004–2019

Career history
- 2004–2005: Chorale Roanne
- 2005–2006: SLUC Nancy
- 2006–2007: TED Ankara Kolejliler
- 2007: SLUC Nancy
- 2007–2008: Scandone Avellino
- 2008–2009: Fenerbahçe
- 2009–2010: Scavolini Spar Pesaro
- 2010–2012: Scandone Avellino
- 2012: Cedevita Zagreb
- 2013: Emporio Armani Milano
- 2013–2014: Dinamo Basket Sassari
- 2014–2015: TED Ankara Kolejliler
- 2015–2017: Scandone Avellino
- 2017–2018: Reyer Venezia
- 2018: Aurora Basket Jesi
- 2018–2019: Piacentina

Career highlights
- 2× Italian Cup winner (2008, 2014); 3× Serie A assist leader (2008, 2011, 2012); Turkish League assists leader (2007); NCAA steals leader (2004); First-team All-Atlantic 10 (2003); Second-team All-Atlantic 10 (2004); Third-team All-Atlantic 10 (2002); 3× Atlantic 10 All-Defensive team (2002–2004)

Marques Oscar Green (born March 18, 1982) is an American-born naturalized Macedonian professional basketball player who last played for Pallacanestro Piacentina of the Italian Serie A2 Basket.

== Career highlights ==
Green graduated from St. Bonaventure University in 2004. In his last year, he had averages of 19.4 points, 3.3 rebounds, 5.2 assists and 4.0 steals per game. After his graduation, he decided to continue his career in Europe and started to play for Chorale Roanne Basket of France in his first professional year.

One year later, he was signed by SLUC Nancy Basket where he averaged 9.9 points and 6.6 assists. Before playing for his current team, Air Avellino, he played in Turkey for CASA TED Kolejliler, where he scored more than 500 points in one season.

In August 2012, Green signed a one-year deal with Cedevita Zagreb. On January 2, 2013, he returned to Italy and signed a contract with Emporio Armani Milano till the end of the season.

On July 7, 2013, Green signed a one-year deal with Dinamo Sassari.

In August 2014, he signed with TED Ankara Kolejliler of Turkey. On March 13, 2015, he left Ankara and signed with his former team Scandone Avellino.

On November 29, 2017, he signed with Reyer Venezia. On January 18, 2018, he left Venezia and signed with Aurora Basket Jesi for the rest of the 2017–18 Serie A2 season.

== National team ==
In 2010, he played two games for Macedonian national team in qualification for EuroBasket 2011. His average score was 3 points, 6.5 assists, and 3.5 steals.

== Career ==
Season	Team	Competition	Games	Pts.	Reb.	Ast.	Min.
2000–01	St. Bonaventure	(United States) NCAA D–I	28	6.2	1.6	4.3	
2001–02	St. Bonaventure	(United States) NCAA D–I	30	15.4	3.2	6.0	38.0
2002–03	St. Bonaventure	(United States) NCAA D–I	27	21.3	3.7	8.0	37.1
2003–04	St. Bonaventure	(United States) NCAA D–I	27	19.4	3.3	5.2	39.4
2004–05	Chorale Roanne	(France) LNB Pro–A	22	17.0	2.5	6.9	33.0
2005–06	SLUC Nancy	(France) LNB Pro–A	34	9.9	2.5	6.6	30.5
2006–07	SLUC Nancy	(France) LNB Pro–A	4	5.0	2.0	3.0	18.0
	CASA TED Kolejliler	(Turkey) TBL 1	31	17.1	4.2	7.0	35.0
2007–08	Air Avellino	(Italy) Serie A	40	13.3	3.8	6.7	34.1
2008–09	Fenerbahçe Ülker	(Turkey) TBL 1	41	6.1	1.7	3.2	
2009–10	Scavolini Spar Pesaro	(Italy) Serie A	29	11.6	3.2	5	33

== See also ==
- List of NCAA Division I men's basketball season steals leaders
