= Fabio Mian =

Italian basketball player (born 1992)

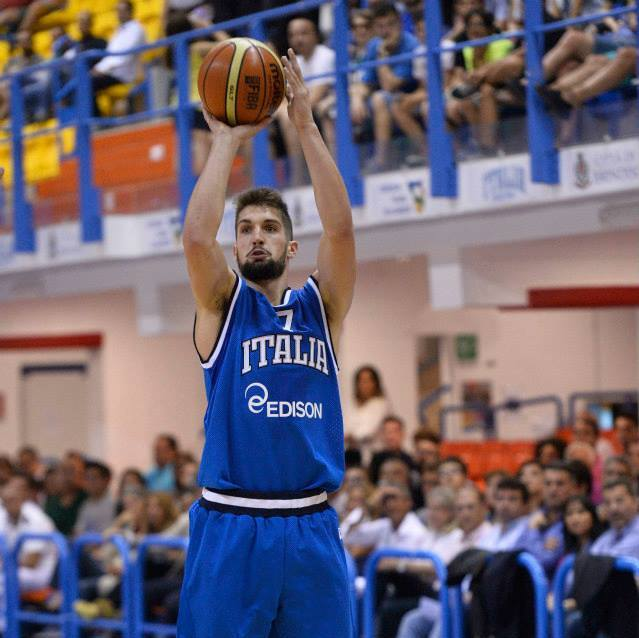

Free Agent
- Position: Guard

Personal information
- Born: February 7, 1992 (age 34) Gorizia, Italy
- Listed height: 1.96 m (6 ft 5 in)
- Listed weight: 88 kg (194 lb)

Career information
- Playing career: 2008–present

Career history
- 2008–2009: Cestistica Basket Udine
- 2009–2011: Pallacanestro Varese
- 2011–2012: CUS Bari
- 2012–2014: Fortitudo Agrigento
- 2014–2017: Vanoli Cremona
- 2017–2018: Pistoia Basket
- 2018–2020: Aquila Basket Trento
- 2020–2021: Vanoli Cremona
- 2021: APU Udine
- 2021–2022: Pallacanestro Trieste
- 2022–2023: Scafati Basket

Fabio Mian (born February 7, 1992) is an Italian professional basketball player who last played for Scafati Basket of the Italian Lega Basket Serie A.

== Professional career ==
He played for two seasons, from 2018 to 2020 for Aquila Trento.

Mian signed with Cremona on August 4, 2020, after having played with the team from 2014 to 2017.

He ended the 2020–21 season with APU Udine for a short end of the season experience in the Serie A2, second tier Italian national league.

Mian, on June 30, 2021, returned in the Serie A signing a two years contract with Pallacanestro Trieste.

On December 28, 2022, he signed with Scafati Basket of the Italian Lega Basket Serie A.
