= 2017 Italian Basketball Cup =

Tournament details
- Arena: Padiglioni Fiera Rimini; Rimini, Italy
- Dates: 16–19 February 2017

Final positions
- Champions: EA7 Emporio Armani Milano
- Runners-up: Banco di Sardegna Sassari

Awards and statistics
- MVP: (Georgia (country)) Ricky Hickman

The 2017 Italian Basketball Cup, knows as the PosteMobile Final Eight for sponsorship reasons, was the 49th edition of Italy's national cup tournament. The competition is organised by Lega Basket for LBA clubs. The tournament was played from 16 to 19 February 2017 in Rimini.

EA7 Emporio Armani Milano were the defending champions.

EA7 Emporio Armani Milano went to win his 6th Cup by beating Banco di Sardegna Sassari 84–74 in the Finals. Ricky Hickman was named Finals MVP of the competition.

== Qualification ==
Qualified for the tournament were selected based on their position on the LBA table at the end of the first half of the season.

Pos	Team	Pld	W	L	PF	PA	PD	Qualification
1	EA7 Emporio Armani Milano	15	13	2	1335	1195	+140	Qualified as seeded teams
2	Umana Reyer Venezia	15	11	4	1243	1205	+38	Qualified as seeded teams
3	Sidigas Avellino	15	11	4	1210	1121	+89	Qualified as seeded teams
4	Grissin Bon Reggio Emilia	15	9	6	1215	1217	−2	Qualified as seeded teams
5	Betaland Capo d'Orlando	15	8	7	1167	1152	+15	Qualified as non-seeded teams
6	Banco di Sardegna Sassari	15	8	7	1177	1118	+59	Qualified as non-seeded teams
7	Germani Basket Brescia	15	7	8	1228	1224	+4	Qualified as non-seeded teams
8	Enel Brindisi	15	7	8	1278	1242	+36	Qualified as non-seeded teams

Source: LBA

== Bracket ==
Quarter-finals (16-17 February 2017)
1	EA7 Emporio Armani Milano	77
8	Enel Brindisi	75
4	Grissin Bon Reggio Emilia	63
5	Betaland Capo d'Orlando	61
3	Sidigas Avellino	68
6	Banco di Sardegna Sassari	69
2	Umana Reyer Venezia	68
7	Germani Basket Brescia	76

Semifinals (18 February 2017)
1	EA7 Emporio Armani Milano	87
4	Grissin Bon Reggio Emilia	84
6	Banco di Sardegna Sassari	77
7	Germani Basket Brescia	70

Final (19 February 2017)
1	EA7 Emporio Armani Milano	84
6	Banco di Sardegna Sassari	74

== Quarterfinals ==
=== Grissin Bon Reggio Emilia vs. Betaland Capo d'Orlando ===
16 February 2017 Quarterfinal A	Grissin Bon Reggio Emilia	63–61	Betaland Capo d'Orlando	Rimini
18:00 (CET)	Scoring by quarter: 14–16, 21–17, 15–18, 13–10
RAI	Pts: Aradori 11; Rebs: Reynolds 8 Asts: Aradori, Needham 3 PIR: Kaukėnas 11	Boxscore	Pts: Archie 14; Rebs: Delaš 8 Asts: Stojanović 4 PIR: Archie 23	Arena: Padiglioni Fiera Rimini; Referees: Roberto Begnis, Alessandro Martolini, Luca Weidmann

Starters:			Pts	Reb	Ast
PG	5	(United States) Derek Needham	6	5	3
SG	8	(Italy) Amedeo Della Valle	9	4	1
SF	4	(Italy) Pietro Aradori	11	1	3
PF	6	(Italy) Achille Polonara	3	7	1
C	14	(Italy) Riccardo Cervi	10	3	1
Reserves:					
C	7	(United States) Jalen Reynolds	7	8	0
PG	9	(Italy) Andrea De Nicolao	6	0	1
SF	12	(Latvia) Artūrs Strautiņš	0	0	0
SG	13	(Lithuania) Rimantas Kaukėnas	8	5	1
PF	19	(United States) Jawad Williams	3	2	0
Head coach:
(Italian Basketball Federation) Massimiliano Menetti

Grissin Bon Reggio Emilia	Betaland Capo d'Orlando

Starters:			Pts	Reb	Ast
PG	20	(Montenegro) Nikola Ivanović	6	4	1
SG	16	(United States) Drake Diener	8	4	0
SF	23	(Serbia) Vojislav Stojanović	2	1	4
PF	13	(Croatia) Mario Delaš	10	8	2
C	7	(Italy) Antonio Ianuzzi	9	5	0
Reserves:					
PG	0	(Italy) Giorgio Galipò	DNP		
SF	4	(Serbia) Milenko Tepić	2	4	1
PG	8	(Italy) Tommaso Laquintana	3	1	0
SG	9	(Hungary) Zoltán Perl	7	0	1
C	10	(Croatia) Sandro Nicević	DNP		
PF	21	(United States) Dominique Archie	14	5	2
PG	100	(Italy) Antonio Zanatta	DNP		
Head coach:
(Italian Basketball Federation) Gennaro Di Carlo

=== EA7 Emporio Armani Milano vs. Enel Brindisi ===
16 February 2017 Quarterfinal B	EA7 Emporio Armani Milano	77–75	Enel Brindisi	Rimini
20:45 (CET)	Scoring by quarter: 28–18, 17–26, 16–17, 16–14
RAI	Pts: McLean 14; Rebs: Mačvan, McLean 7 Asts: Kalnietis 7 PIR: Kalnietis 18	Boxscore	Pts: three players 15; Rebs: M'Baye 9 Asts: Moore 4 PIR: M'Baye 22	Arena: Padiglioni Fiera Rimini; Referees: Tolga Sahin, Dino Seghetti, Alessandro Vicino

Starters:			Pts	Reb	Ast
PG	9	(Lithuania) Mantas Kalnietis	8	6	7
SG	7	(Georgia (country)) Ricky Hickman	4	1	1
SF	21	(United States) Rakim Sanders	12	4	1
PF	13	(Serbia) Milan Mačvan	11	7	0
C	1	(United States) Jamel McLean	14	7	1
Reserves:					
SF	2	(Italy) Simone Fontecchio	2	2	1
C	11	(Serbia) Miroslav Raduljica	10	4	0
SG	12	(Slovenia) Zoran Dragić	8	1	1
PF	14	(Italy) Davide Pascolo	6	4	2
PG	20	(Italy) Andrea Cinciarini	2	2	1
SF	23	(Italy) Awudu Abass	DNP		
SG	30	(Italy) Bruno Cerella	DNP		
Head coach:
(Croatian Basketball Federation) Jasmin Repeša

EA7 Emporio Armani Milano	Enel Brindisi

Starters:			Pts	Reb	Ast
PG	11	(United States) Nic Moore	10	3	4
SG	2	(Jamaica) Durand Scott	15	4	2
SF	9	(Italy) Marco Cardillo	0	4	1
PF	24	(France) Amath M'Baye	15	9	1
C	4	(United States) Robert Carter	15	5	2
Reserves:					
C	1	(Nigeria) Danny Agbelese	6	0	0
PG	5	(United States) Phil Goss	9	3	0
PF	6	(Italy) Simone Fiusco	DNP		
PG	7	(Slovenia) Blaž Mesiček	0	0	0
SG	15	(Italy) Daniel Donzelli	5	7	1
PF	33	(Italy) Giorgio Sgobba	DNP		
PG	45	(Italy) Marco Spanghero	DNP		
Head coach:
(Italian Basketball Federation) Romeo Sacchetti

=== Sidigas Avellino vs. Banco di Sardegna Sassari ===
17 February 2017 Quarterfinal C	Sidigas Avellino	68–69	Banco di Sardegna Sassari	Rimini
18:00 (CET)	Scoring by quarter: 22–13, 16–26, 16–17, 14–13
RAI	Pts: Ragland, Thomas 16; Rebs: Fesenko, Thomas 11; Asts: Green 5 PIR: Fesenko 26	Boxscore	Pts: Stipčević 15; Rebs: Lacey 7 Asts: Stipčević, Lacey 3 PIR: Lacey 19	Arena: Padiglioni Fiera Rimini; Referees: Dino Seghetti, Carmelo Lo Guzzo, Lorenzo Baldini

Starters:			Pts	Reb	Ast
PG	1	(Liberia) Joe Ragland	16	0	2
SG	32	(Belgium) Retin Obasohan	0	2	1
SF	55	(United States) Adonis Thomas	16	11	3
PF	10	(United States) Maarten Leunen	5	3	2
C	44	(Ukraine) Kyrylo Fesenko	12	11	1
Reserves:					
PF	0	(Italy) Andrea Zerini	0	3	0
PG	4	(North Macedonia) Marques Green	5	3	5
PF	6	(Italy) Michele Esposito	DNP		
SG	8	(Italy) Lorenzo Esposito	DNP		
SG	19	(Italy) Giovanni Severini	0	0	0
SG	20	(United States) Levi Randolph	14	2	1
SF	57	(Italy) Salvatore Parlato	0	0	0
Head coach:
(Italian Basketball Federation) Stefano Sacripanti

Sidigas Avellino	Banco di Sardegna Sassari

Starters:			Pts	Reb	Ast
PG	5	(United States) David Bell	8	1	1
SG	7	(United States) Trevor Lacey	14	7	3
SF	8	(Italy) Giacomo Devecchi	0	0	0
PF	14	(Italy) Brian Sacchetti	7	2	2
C	16	(Lithuania) Tautvydas Lydeka	2	1	0
Reserves:					
PG	10	(Italy) Lorenzo D'Ercole	0	1	0
PF	20	(Serbia) Duško Savanović	6	6	1
SF	23	(United States) Josh Carter	7	4	2
SG	24	(Croatia) Rok Stipčević	15	2	3
C	31	(Nigeria) Gani Lawal	10	5	1
PG	32	(Italy) Diego Monaldi	DNP		
PF	99	(Italy) Michele Ebeling	DNP		
Head coach:
(Italian Basketball Federation) Federico Pasquini

=== Umana Reyer Venezia vs. Germani Basket Brescia ===
17 February 2017 Quarterfinal D	Umana Reyer Venezia	68–76	Germani Basket Brescia	Rimini
20:45 (CET)	Scoring by quarter: 15–25, 22–17, 18–14, 13–20
RAI	Pts: Bramos 22; Rebs: Perić 6 Asts: Haynes 5 PIR: Bramos 24	Boxscore	Pts: Landry 19; Rebs: Moss 8 Asts: Vitali 8 PIR: Landry 21	Arena: Padiglioni Fiera Rimini

Starters:			Pts	Reb	Ast
PG	0	(Georgia (country)) MarQuez Haynes	8	3	5
SG	25	(United States) Tyrus McGee	8	4	1
SF	3	(Nigeria) Melvin Ejim	9	5	3
PF	6	(Greece) Michael Bramos	22	1	1
C	2	(United States) Jamelle Hagins	4	4	2
Reserves:					
SF	4	(Croatia) Hrvoje Perić	8	6	1
SG	9	(Italy) Riccardo Visconti	0	0	0
PG	12	(Italy) Ariel Filloy	DNP		
PF	14	(Italy) Tomas Ress	2	1	0
C	16	(Austria) Benjamin Ortner	4	1	0
SG	18	(Italy) Martino Criconia	DNP		
SF	22	(Italy) Jeffrey Viggiano	3	1	2
Head coach:
(Italian Basketball Federation) Walter De Raffaele

Umana Reyer Venezia	Germani Basket Brescia

Starters:			Pts	Reb	Ast
PG	7	(Italy) Luca Vitali	11	6	8
SG	34	(United States) David Moss	10	8	2
SF	8	(United States) Marcus Landry	19	6	1
PF	2	(United States) Lee Moore	2	4	1
C	4	(United States) Jared Berggren	14	3	0
Reserves:					
PG	10	(Italy) Alessio Bolis	DNP		
SG	12	(Italy) Berthol Nyonse	DNP		
PF	23	(Italy) Christian Burns	15	7	0
SG	31	(Italy) Michele Vitali	0	3	2
SG	70	(Albania) Franko Bushati	5	3	0
Head coach:
(Italian Basketball Federation) Andrea Diana

== Semifinals ==
EA7 Emporio Armani Milan rallied to beat Grissin Bon Reggio Emilia 84-87 and reach Italian Cup finals. Rakim Sanders led the way with 22 points and 5 steals, while Davide Pascolo scored 9 of his 14 points in the fourth quarter for Milan. Pietro Aradori was Reggio Emilia’s top scorer with 14 points. Reggio Emilia had 8 different scorers in the first quarter, and finished it with a 14-4 run, capped with an Aradori triple that made it 26-18. Reggio Emilia extended it to 38-28 in the second, but Sanders scored 11 points in the second stanza to help Milan get back and tie the game at 45-45 at halftime. Teams traded leads in the third, and Aradori’s basket got Reggio Emilia in front at the end of the third quarter, 64-59. Davide Pascolo kept Milan in touch in the fourth, before Zoran Dragic, Andrea Cinciarini and Milan Macvan hit back-to-back threes to make it 81-87, and Milan held on for victory. In Sunday’s final, Milan will play Banco di Sardegna Sassari which downed Germani Basket Brescia 77-70. Trevor Lacey had 15 points plus 8 rebounds, and Rok Stipcevic scored 13 points in victory.

=== EA7 Emporio Armani Milano vs. Grissin Bon Reggio Emilia ===
18 February 2017 Semifinal A	EA7 Emporio Armani Milano	87–84	Grissin Bon Reggio Emilia	Rimini
17:30 (CET)	Scoring by quarter: 18–26, 27–19, 14–19, 28–20
RAI	Pts: Sanders 22; Rebs: McLean 7 Asts: three players 5 PIR: Sanders 27	Boxscore	Pts: Aradori 14; Rebs: Polonara 6 Asts: Della Valle, Kaukėnas 4 PIR: three players 15	Arena: Padiglioni Fiera Rimini; Referees: Carmelo Lo Guzzo, Manuel Mazzoni, Michele Rossi

Starters:			Pts	Reb	Ast
PG	7	(Georgia (country)) Ricky Hickman	6	3	1
SG	12	(Slovenia) Zoran Dragić	9	1	0
SF	21	(United States) Rakim Sanders	22	4	5
PF	13	(Serbia) Milan Mačvan	7	5	1
C	11	(Serbia) Miroslav Raduljica	9	1	3
Reserves:					
C	1	(United States) Jamel McLean	7	7	3
SF	2	(Italy) Simone Fontecchio	DNP		
PG	9	(Lithuania) Mantas Kalnietis	8	0	5
PF	14	(Italy) Davide Pascolo	14	4	0
PG	20	(Italy) Andrea Cinciarini	5	4	5
SF	23	(Italy) Awudu Abass	0	0	0
SG	30	(Italy) Bruno Cerella	DNP		
Head coach:
(Croatian Basketball Federation) Jasmin Repeša

EA7 Emporio Armani Milano	Grissin Bon Reggio Emilia

Starters:			Pts	Reb	Ast
PG	5	(United States) Derek Needham	11	4	2
SG	8	(Italy) Amedeo Della Valle	12	2	4
SF	4	(Italy) Pietro Aradori	14	2	2
PF	6	(Italy) Achille Polonara	4	6	1
C	14	(Italy) Riccardo Cervi	3	2	0
Reserves:					
C	7	(United States) Jalen Reynolds	12	4	0
PG	9	(Italy) Andrea De Nicolao	13	1	1
SF	12	(Latvia) Artūrs Strautiņš	0	0	0
SG	13	(Lithuania) Rimantas Kaukėnas	6	3	4
PF	19	(United States) Jawad Williams	9	1	0
Head coach:
(Italian Basketball Federation) Massimiliano Menetti

=== Banco di Sardegna Sassari vs. Germani Basket Brescia ===
18 February 2017 Semifinal B	Banco di Sardegna Sassari	77–70	Germani Basket Brescia	Rimini
20:45 (CET)	Scoring by quarter: 22–15, 11–24, 27–16, 17–15
RAI	Pts: Lacey 15; Rebs: Lacey 8 Asts: Lacey 5 PIR: Lacey 26	Boxscore	Pts: Landry 20; Rebs: Lee Moore 8 Asts: Vitali 8 PIR: Landry 18	Arena: Padiglioni Fiera Rimini; Referees: Tolga Sahin, Saverio Lanzarini, Gianluca Sardella

Starters:			Pts	Reb	Ast
PG	5	(United States) David Bell	10	4	2
SG	7	(United States) Trevor Lacey	15	8	5
SF	8	(Italy) Giacomo Devecchi	8	2	0
PF	14	(Italy) Brian Sacchetti	3	3	0
C	16	(Lithuania) Tautvydas Lydeka	6	4	1
Reserves:					
PG	10	(Italy) Lorenzo D'Ercole	0	0	0
PF	20	(Serbia) Duško Savanović	12	6	1
SF	23	(United States) Josh Carter	0	1	0
SG	24	(Croatia) Rok Stipčević	13	2	0
C	31	(Nigeria) Gani Lawal	10	7	0
PG	32	(Italy) Diego Monaldi	DNP		
PF	99	(Italy) Michele Ebeling	DNP		
Head coach:
(Italian Basketball Federation) Federico Pasquini

Banco di Sardegna Sassari	Germani Basket Brescia

Starters:			Pts	Reb	Ast
PG	7	(Italy) Luca Vitali	7	4	8
SG	34	(United States) David Moss	8	3	0
SF	8	(United States) Marcus Landry	20	3	0
PF	2	(United States) Lee Moore	16	8	1
C	4	(United States) Jared Berggren	4	4	0
Reserves:					
PG	10	(Italy) Alessio Bolis	DNP		
SG	12	(Italy) Berthol Nyonse	DNP		
PF	23	(Italy) Christian Burns	2	6	0
SG	31	(Italy) Michele Vitali	8	5	1
SG	70	(Italy) Franko Bushati	5	1	0
Head coach:
(Italian Basketball Federation) Andrea Diana

== Final ==
EA7 Emporio Armani Milano successfully defended the Italian Cup with an 84-74 come-from-behind win over Banco di Sardegna Sassari in the final on Sunday. Ricky Hickman made 5 of 7 shots from downtown en route to 25 points, Rakim Sanders scored 15 points and Milan Macvan added 11 for the winners. Sassari took charge from the start with a 2-13 run and led 11-19 after 10 minutes. A Josh Carter triple made it 15-25 midway through the second quarter, but Sanders heated up as Milan fought back and Hickman’s triple to end the half drew Milan within 34-36. A three by Sanders to open the second half gave Milan its first lead. Hickman netted another three and Davide Pascolo converted a three-point play to boost the margin to 46-40. Andrea Cinciarini further extended the margin to 9 before strong play by Gani Lawal sparked a Sassari comeback. A David Bell jumper made it 56-54 through three quarters. It was still a 2-point game four minutes into the fourth quarter when Hickman and Macvan combined for all Milan’s points in an 11-2 march to take a 75-64 advantage with 3:38 remaining. Sassari raced back with 8 straight points, but was held to a single basket over the final two minutes as Milan closed out the game from the line. Trevor Lacey paced Sassari with 15 points, Lawal scored 13 and Rok Stipcevic 11.

=== EA7 Emporio Armani Milano vs. Banco di Sardegna Sassari ===
19 February 2017 Final	EA7 Emporio Armani Milano	84–74	Banco di Sardegna Sassari	Rimini
18:00 (CET)	Scoring by quarter: 11–19, 23–17, 22–18, 28–20
RAI	Pts: Hickman 25; Rebs: Mačvan 7 Asts: Cinciarini 4 PIR: Hickman 26	Boxscore	Pts: Lacey 15; Rebs: Lydeka 9 Asts: Sacchetti 4 PIR: Lawal 17	Arena: Padiglioni Fiera Rimini; Referees: Roberto Begnis, Dino Seghetti, Massimiliano Filippini

Starters:			Pts	Reb	Ast
PG	7	(Georgia (country)) Ricky Hickman	25	3	2
SG	9	(Lithuania) Mantas Kalnietis	9	3	2
SF	21	(United States) Rakim Sanders	15	6	3
PF	14	(Italy) Davide Pascolo	5	1	1
C	11	(Serbia) Miroslav Raduljica	0	2	0
Reserves:					
C	1	(United States) Jamel McLean	6	4	2
SF	2	(Italy) Simone Fontecchio	DNP		
SG	12	(Slovenia) Zoran Dragić	7	4	0
PF	13	(Serbia) Milan Mačvan	11	7	1
PG	20	(Italy) Andrea Cinciarini	6	6	4
SF	23	(Italy) Awudu Abass	DNP		
SG	30	(Italy) Bruno Cerella	0	0	0
Head coach:
(Croatian Basketball Federation) Jasmin Repeša

EA7 Emporio Armani Milano	Banco di Sardegna Sassari

Italian Cup MVP
(Georgia (country)) Ricky Hickman
Game rules
Game played under FIBA rules.

2017 Italian Cup Winners

EA7 Emporio Armani Milano
6th title

Starters:			Pts	Reb	Ast
PG	5	(United States) David Bell	5	1	1
SG	7	(United States) Trevor Lacey	15	2	1
SF	8	(Italy) Giacomo Devecchi	3	2	1
PF	14	(Italy) Brian Sacchetti	3	3	4
C	16	(Lithuania) Tautvydas Lydeka	9	9	2
Reserves:					
PG	10	(Italy) Lorenzo D'Ercole	0	0	1
PF	20	(Serbia) Duško Savanović	7	6	0
SF	23	(United States) Josh Carter	8	3	2
SG	24	(Croatia) Rok Stipčević	11	1	2
C	31	(Nigeria) Gani Lawal	13	7	0
PG	32	(Italy) Diego Monaldi	DNP		
PF	99	(Italy) Michele Ebeling	DNP		
Head coach:
(Italian Basketball Federation) Federico Pasquini

== Sponsors ==
- PosteMobile (title sponsor)
- Panasonic (main sponsor)
- Fastweb (technology partner)
- Molten (official ball)
- MyGlass (official partner)
- Prozis (nutrition partner)
- Frecciarossa (official train)
- Radio Italia (media partner)
- La Gazzetta dello Sport (media partner)
- Rai Sport (media partner)
- Acqua Lete (official water)
- Dr. Gibaud
- Anthea
- Fiat
- Tecnovision
- Italian Exhibition Group
- Regione Emilia Romagna
- Comune di Rimini
- Star App
- bertelè
- Ferrari Spumante
