= 2015–16 Euroleague squads =

This article contains all squads that played in the 2015–16 Euroleague basketball tournament.

== Group A ==
=== Real Madrid ===
Real Madrid roster
Players
Coaches

Pos.	No.	Nat.	Name	Ht.	Wt.	Age
F/C	14	(Mexico)	Ayón, Gustavo	2.08 m (6 ft 10 in)	113 kg (249 lb)	41 – 1 April 1985
SG	20	(Azerbaijan)	Carroll, Jaycee	1.88 m (6 ft 2 in)	77 kg (170 lb)	43 – 16 April 1983
G	7	(Slovenia)	Dončić, Luka	2.01 m (6 ft 7 in)	99 kg (218 lb)	27 – 28 February 1999
G/F	5	(Spain)	Fernández, Rudy	1.98 m (6 ft 6 in)	84 kg (185 lb)	41 – 4 April 1985
C	41	(Spain)	Hernangómez, Guillermo	2.10 m (6 ft 11 in)	113 kg (249 lb)	31 – 27 May 1994
F/C	22	(Brazil)	Lima, Augusto	2.06 m (6 ft 9 in)	104 kg (229 lb)	34 – 17 September 1991
G	23	(Spain)	Llull, Sergio	1.92 m (6 ft 4 in)	95.4 kg (210 lb)	38 – 15 November 1987
SF	8	(Lithuania)	Mačiulis, Jonas	2.01 m (6 ft 7 in)	107 kg (236 lb)	41 – 10 February 1985
PF	4	(Senegal)	Ndour, Maurice	2.06 m (6 ft 9 in)	91 kg (201 lb)	33 – 18 June 1992
F	6	(Argentina)	Nocioni, Andrés	2.03 m (6 ft 8 in)	102 kg (225 lb)	46 – 30 November 1979
PF	9	(Spain)	Reyes, Felipe (C)	2.06 m (6 ft 9 in)	118 kg (260 lb)	46 – 16 March 1980
SG	3	(United States)	Rivers, K. C.	1.96 m (6 ft 5 in)	97 kg (214 lb)	39 – 1 March 1987
PG	13	(Spain)	Rodríguez, Sergio	1.91 m (6 ft 3 in)	80 kg (176 lb)	39 – 12 June 1986
G/F	44	(Sweden)	Taylor, Jeffery	2.01 m (6 ft 7 in)	102 kg (225 lb)	36 – 23 May 1989
PF	33	(United States)	Thompkins, Trey	2.08 m (6 ft 10 in)	111 kg (245 lb)	35 – 29 May 1990

Head coach

- (Spain) Pablo Laso

Assistant coach(es)

- (Spain) Jesús Mateo
- (Spain) Francisco Redondo

Fitness trainer(s)

- (Spain) Juan Trapero

Legend

- (C) Team captain
- Injured

- Roster
Updated: 25 January 2016

=== Fenerbahçe ===
Fenerbahçe roster
Players
Coaches

Pos.	No.	Nat.	Name	Ht.	Wt.	Age
PG	23	(Turkey)	Uğurlu, Berk	1.92 m (6 ft 4 in)	72 kg (159 lb)	30 – 27 April 1996
PG	35	(Turkey)	Dixon, Bobby (DC)	1.78 m (5 ft 10 in)	73 kg (161 lb)	43 – 10 April 1983
G	3	(Georgia (country))	Hickman, Ricky	1.89 m (6 ft 2 in)	88 kg (194 lb)	40 – 1 September 1985
G	16	(Greece)	Sloukas, Kostas	1.90 m (6 ft 3 in)	95 kg (209 lb)	36 – 15 January 1990
SG	10	(Turkey)	Mahmutoğlu, Melih (C)	1.91 m (6 ft 3 in)	85 kg (187 lb)	35 – 12 May 1990
SG	13	(Serbia)	Bogdanović, Bogdan	1.98 m (6 ft 6 in)	93 kg (205 lb)	33 – 18 August 1992
SF	18	(Turkey)	Arna, Egehan	2.03 m (6 ft 8 in)	88 kg (194 lb)	29 – 5 January 1997
SF	33	(Serbia)	Kalinić, Nikola	2.03 m (6 ft 8 in)	101 kg (223 lb)	34 – 8 November 1991
F	70	(Italy)	Datome, Luigi	2.03 m (6 ft 8 in)	98 kg (216 lb)	38 – 27 November 1987
PF	5	(Turkey)	Hersek, Barış	2.08 m (6 ft 10 in)	104 kg (229 lb)	38 – 26 March 1988
C	8	(United States)	Udoh, Ekpe	2.08 m (6 ft 10 in)	111 kg (245 lb)	38 – 20 May 1987
F/C	12	(North Macedonia)	Antić, Pero	2.11 m (6 ft 11 in)	118 kg (260 lb)	43 – 29 July 1982
F/C	22	(Turkey)	Bayrak, Ercan	2.08 m (6 ft 10 in)	95 kg (209 lb)	28 – 9 July 1997
F/C	24	(Czech Republic)	Veselý, Jan	2.13 m (7 ft 0 in)	110 kg (243 lb)	36 – 24 April 1990

Head coach

- (Serbia) Željko Obradović

Assistant coach(es)

- (Spain) Josep Maria Izquierdo
- (Serbia) Vladimir Androić
- (Turkey) Erdem Can

Athletic trainer(s)

- (Serbia) Predrag Zimonjić
- (Turkey) İlker Belgutay

Physiotherapist(s)

- (Turkey) Sefa Öztürk

Team manager

- (Italy) Maurizio Gherardini
- (Turkey) Ömer Onan
- (Turkey) Cenk Renda

Legend

- (C) Team captain
- Injured

- Roster
Updated: 16 April 2015

=== Khimki ===
BC Khimki roster
Players
Coaches

Pos.	No.	Nat.	Name	Ht.	Wt.	Age
PG	0	(Montenegro)	Rice, Tyrese	1.85 m (6 ft 1 in)	86 kg (190 lb)	38 – 15 May 1987
CG	1	(Russia)	Shved, Alexey	1.98 m (6 ft 6 in)	86 kg (190 lb)	37 – 16 December 1988
G/F	3	(Slovenia)	Dragić, Zoran	1.96 m (6 ft 5 in)	91 kg (201 lb)	36 – 22 June 1989
PF	5	(United States)	Augustine, James	2.08 m (6 ft 10 in)	107 kg (236 lb)	42 – 27 February 1984
PF	6	(United States)	Boone, Josh	2.08 m (6 ft 10 in)	108 kg (238 lb)	41 – 21 November 1984
C	7	(Russia)	Pateev, Ruslan (injured)	2.13 m (7 ft 0 in)	113 kg (249 lb)	36 – 25 April 1990
PG	8	(Finland)	Koponen, Petteri	1.94 m (6 ft 4 in)	88 kg (194 lb)	38 – 13 April 1988
SG	9	(Russia)	Vyaltsev, Egor	1.93 m (6 ft 4 in)	88 kg (194 lb)	40 – 10 October 1985
C	10	(Russia)	Sokolov, Dmitri	2.14 m (7 ft 0 in)	113 kg (249 lb)	41 – 21 January 1985
F	11	(Russia)	Ilnitskiy, Stanislav	2.00 m (6 ft 7 in)	98 kg (216 lb)	32 – 24 February 1994
SF	12	(Russia)	Monia, Sergei	2.02 m (6 ft 8 in)	99 kg (218 lb)	43 – 15 April 1983
F/C	19	(Montenegro)	Todorović, Marko	2.09 m (6 ft 10 in)	111 kg (245 lb)	34 – 19 April 1992
C	21	(Russia)	Kashirov, Anatoly	2.15 m (7 ft 1 in)	100 kg (220 lb)	38 – 19 May 1987
SF	33	(United States)	Honeycutt, Tyler	2.03 m (6 ft 8 in)	90 kg (198 lb)	35 – 15 July 1990
SG	34	(Russia)	Sakharov, Maxim	1.90 m (6 ft 3 in)	82 kg (181 lb)	32 – 25 June 1993
C	40	(United States)	Davis, Paul	2.11 m (6 ft 11 in)	115 kg (254 lb)	41 – 21 July 1984
PF	45	(Russia)	Sheleketo, Maxim	2.04 m (6 ft 8 in)	104 kg (229 lb)	39 – 4 January 1987

Head coach

- (Lithuania) Rimas Kurtinaitis

Strength & conditioning coach(es)

- (Serbia) Aleksandar Lukman

Physiotherapist(s)

- (Russia) Pavel Tabachnikov
- (Russia) Vladimir Ryumshin

Team manager

- (Russia) Vladimir Belyakov

Legend

- (C) Team captain
- Injured

- Roster
Updated: 3 August 2015

=== Crvena Zvezda ===
KK Crvena zvezda roster
Players
Coaches

Pos.	No.	Nat.	Name	Ht.	Wt.	Age
G/F	1	(United States)	Kinsey, Tarence	2.00 m (6 ft 7 in)	86 kg (190 lb)	42 – 21 March 1984
PG	4	(Serbia)	Rebić, Nikola	1.88 m (6 ft 2 in)	80 kg (176 lb)	31 – 22 January 1995
G/F	6	(Serbia)	Dangubić, Nemanja	2.04 m (6 ft 8 in)	88 kg (194 lb)	33 – 13 April 1993
PF	9	(Serbia)	Mitrović, Luka (C)	2.05 m (6 ft 9 in)	102 kg (225 lb)	33 – 21 March 1993
G/F	10	(Serbia)	Lazić, Branko	1.95 m (6 ft 5 in)	87 kg (192 lb)	37 – 12 January 1989
F	12	(Serbia)	Simanić, Boriša	2.09 m (6 ft 10 in)	92 kg (203 lb)	28 – 20 March 1998
PG	13	(Serbia)	Micić, Vasilije	1.95 m (6 ft 5 in)	92 kg (203 lb)	32 – 13 January 1994
SF	19	(Serbia)	Simonović, Marko	2.03 m (6 ft 8 in)	95 kg (209 lb)	39 – 30 May 1986
C	22	(Serbia)	Nastić, Stefan	2.11 m (6 ft 11 in)	111 kg (245 lb)	33 – 22 November 1992
SG	23	(Serbia)	Gudurić, Marko	1.99 m (6 ft 6 in)	91 kg (201 lb)	31 – 8 March 1995
PG	24	(Serbia)	Jović, Stefan	1.98 m (6 ft 6 in)	94 kg (207 lb)	35 – 3 November 1990
F	30	(United States)	Miller, Quincy	2.08 m (6 ft 10 in)	107 kg (236 lb)	33 – 18 November 1992
C	33	(Germany)	Zirbes, Maik	2.08 m (6 ft 10 in)	115 kg (254 lb)	36 – 29 January 1990
C	51	(Serbia)	Štimac, Vladimir	2.11 m (6 ft 11 in)	116 kg (256 lb)	38 – 25 September 1987

Head coach

- (Montenegro) Dejan Radonjić

Assistant coach(es)

- (Montenegro) Borko Radović
- (Serbia) Saša Kosović
- (Serbia) Nikola Birač

Strength & conditioning coach(es)

- (Montenegro) Dragan Gačević

Physiotherapist(s)

- (Serbia) Milorad Ćirić

Team manager

- (Serbia) Nebojša Ilić

Legend

- (C) Team captain
- Injured

- Roster
Updated: 28 December 2015

=== Bayern Munich ===
FC Bayern Munich roster
Players
Coaches

Pos.	No.	Nat.	Name	Ht.	Wt.	Age
PF	9	(United States)	Thompson, Deon	2.04 m (6 ft 8 in)	109 kg (240 lb)	37 – 16 September 1988
PG	10	(United States)	Cobbs, Justin	1.91 m (6 ft 3 in)	86 kg (190 lb)	35 – 16 March 1991
PG	12	(Bosnia and Herzegovina)	Renfroe, Alex	1.91 m (6 ft 3 in)	80 kg (176 lb)	39 – 23 May 1986
SF	14	(Bosnia and Herzegovina)	Đedović, Nihad	1.96 m (6 ft 5 in)	86 kg (190 lb)	36 – 12 January 1990
G/F	16	(Germany)	Zipser, Paul	2.03 m (6 ft 8 in)	94 kg (207 lb)	32 – 18 February 1994
PF	20	(Serbia)	Savanović, Duško	2.04 m (6 ft 8 in)	102 kg (225 lb)	42 – 5 September 1983
PF	23	(Zimbabwe)	Chikoko, Vitalis	2.08 m (6 ft 10 in)	91 kg (201 lb)	35 – 11 February 1991
G	25	(Germany)	Gavel, Anton	1.89 m (6 ft 2 in)	87 kg (192 lb)	41 – 24 October 1984
G/F	30	(United States)	Toppert, Chad	2.01 m (6 ft 7 in)	91 kg (201 lb)	40 – 11 November 1985
C	41	(Germany)	Mayr, Daniel	2.16 m (7 ft 1 in)	96 kg (212 lb)	30 – 28 July 1995
PF	42	(Germany)	Kleber, Maximilian	2.07 m (6 ft 9 in)	98 kg (216 lb)	34 – 29 January 1992
SG	44	(United States)	Taylor, Bryce (C)	1.95 m (6 ft 5 in)	95 kg (209 lb)	39 – 27 September 1986
C	54	(United States)	Bryant, John	2.11 m (6 ft 11 in)	127 kg (280 lb)	38 – 13 June 1987

Head coach

- (Serbia) Svetislav Pešić

Assistant coach(es)

- (Bosnia and Herzegovina) Emir Mutapčić
- (Germany) Philipp Köchling

Athletic trainer(s)

- (Serbia) Jovan Buha

Team manager

- (Germany) Florian Högerl

Legend

- (C) Team captain
- Injured

- Roster
- Transactions
Updated: 29 February 2016

=== Strasbourg ===
Strasbourg IG roster
Players
Coaches

Pos.	No.	Nat.	Name	Ht.	Wt.	Age
G/F	1	(United States)	Collins, Mardy	1.98 m (6 ft 6 in)	100 kg (220 lb)	41 – 4 August 1984
G	3	(France)	Beaubois, Rodrigue	1.88 m (6 ft 2 in)	84 kg (185 lb)	38 – 24 February 1988
G	6	(France)	Lacombe, Paul	1.95 m (6 ft 5 in)	86 kg (190 lb)	35 – 12 June 1990
F	9	(France)	Leloup, Jérémy	2.02 m (6 ft 8 in)	89 kg (196 lb)	39 – 31 January 1987
PG	13	(United States)	Campbell, Louis	1.90 m (6 ft 3 in)	85 kg (187 lb)	47 – 1 April 1979
PG	17	(France)	Ntilikina, Frank	1.93 m (6 ft 4 in)	74 kg (163 lb)	27 – 28 July 1998
G/F	18	(Germany)	Mushidi, Kostja	1.95 m (6 ft 5 in)	95 kg (209 lb)	27 – 18 June 1998
C	21	(France)	Fofana, Bangaly	2.13 m (7 ft 0 in)	107 kg (236 lb)	36 – 3 June 1989
F	34	(United States)	Weems, Kyle	1.98 m (6 ft 6 in)	103 kg (227 lb)	36 – 23 August 1989
C	49	(France)	Duport, Romain	2.15 m (7 ft 1 in)	115 kg (254 lb)	39 – 10 December 1986
PF	54	(United States)	Howard, Matt	2.03 m (6 ft 8 in)	104 kg (229 lb)	37 – 23 January 1989

Head coach

- (France) Vincent Collet

Assistant coach(es)

- (France) Pierre Tavano
- (France) Lauriane Dolt

Legend

- (C) Team captain
- Injured

- Roster
Updated: 1 January 2016

== Group B ==
=== Olympiacos ===
Olympiacos B.C. roster
Players
Coaches

Pos.	No.	Nat.	Name	Ht.	Wt.	Age
G	1	(United States)	Johnson-Odom, Darius	1.91 m (6 ft 3 in)	100 kg (220 lb)	36 – 28 September 1989
C	4	(United States)	Young, Patric (injured)	2.09 m (6 ft 10 in)	114 kg (251 lb)	34 – 1 February 1992
F/C	5	(United States)	Hunter, Othello	2.03 m (6 ft 8 in)	107 kg (236 lb)	39 – 28 May 1986
F	6	(Greece)	Papapetrou, Ioannis	2.06 m (6 ft 9 in)	105.5 kg (233 lb)	32 – 30 March 1994
G	7	(Greece)	Spanoulis, Vassilis (C)	1.93 m (6 ft 4 in)	95.4 kg (210 lb)	43 – 7 August 1982
G/F	8	(United States)	Strawberry, D. J.	1.96 m (6 ft 5 in)	94 kg (207 lb)	40 – 15 June 1985
PF	9	(Greece)	Tsairelis, Michalis	2.08 m (6 ft 10 in)	111 kg (245 lb)	38 – 23 February 1988
PG	10	(Greece)	Toliopoulos, Vassilis	1.88 m (6 ft 2 in)	86 kg (190 lb)	29 – 15 June 1996
C	11	(Serbia)	Milutinov, Nikola	2.13 m (7 ft 0 in)	116 kg (256 lb)	31 – 30 December 1994
G	12	(Greece)	Mouratos, Vassilis	1.94 m (6 ft 4 in)	93 kg (205 lb)	28 – 24 November 1997
PF	15	(Greece)	Printezis, Georgios	2.06 m (6 ft 9 in)	109 kg (240 lb)	41 – 22 February 1985
F/C	16	(Greece)	Agravanis, Dimitrios	2.08 m (6 ft 10 in)	106.5 kg (235 lb)	31 – 20 December 1994
PG	17	(Greece)	Mantzaris, Vangelis	1.96 m (6 ft 5 in)	95.4 kg (210 lb)	36 – 16 April 1990
F/C	21	(United States)	Warrick, Hakim	2.06 m (6 ft 9 in)	100 kg (220 lb)	43 – 8 July 1982
G	23	(Italy)	Hackett, Daniel	1.98 m (6 ft 6 in)	96 kg (212 lb)	38 – 19 December 1987
G/F	24	(Belgium)	Lojeski, Matt	1.98 m (6 ft 6 in)	92 kg (203 lb)	40 – 24 July 1985
F	25	(Greece)	Papanikolaou, Kostas	2.04 m (6 ft 8 in)	107 kg (236 lb)	35 – 31 July 1990
G	27	(Greece)	Athinaiou, Ioannis	1.94 m (6 ft 4 in)	96 kg (212 lb)	37 – 27 May 1988

Head coach

- (Greece) Giannis Sfairopoulos

Assistant coach(es)

- (Serbia) (Greece) Milan Tomić
- (Greece) Christos Marmarinos
- (Greece) Vasilis Geragotellis
- (Greece) Vangelis Koutsoukeras

Athletic trainer(s)

- (Greece) Andreas Gatzoulis

Legend

- (C) Team captain
- Injured

- Roster
Updated: 25 February 2016

=== Anadolu Efes ===
Anadolu Efes roster
Players
Coaches

Pos.	No.	Nat.	Name	Ht.	Wt.	Age
F/C	2	(Israel)	Tyus, Alex	2.03 m (6 ft 8 in)	100 kg (220 lb)	38 – 8 January 1988
SG	3	(Turkey)	Baykan, Oğulcan	1.96 m (6 ft 5 in)	80 kg (176 lb)	30 – 7 January 1996
PG	4	(Turkey)	Balbay, Doğuş	1.85 m (6 ft 1 in)	85 kg (187 lb)	37 – 21 January 1989
PF	5	(United States)	Brown, Derrick	2.03 m (6 ft 8 in)	106 kg (234 lb)	38 – 9 August 1987
G/F	6	(Turkey)	Osman, Cedi	2.06 m (6 ft 9 in)	88 kg (194 lb)	30 – 4 August 1995
G/F	8	(Turkey)	Batuk, Birkan	1.96 m (6 ft 5 in)	87 kg (192 lb)	36 – 30 January 1990
F	9	(Croatia)	Šarić, Dario	2.08 m (6 ft 10 in)	104 kg (229 lb)	32 – 8 April 1994
G/F	10	(Turkey)	Korkmaz, Furkan	2.00 m (6 ft 7 in)	79.5 kg (175 lb)	28 – 24 July 1997
C	12	(Serbia)	Krstić, Nenad (injured)	2.13 m (7 ft 0 in)	121 kg (267 lb)	42 – 25 July 1983
G/F	13	(Turkey)	Ulubay, Okben	2.01 m (6 ft 7 in)	86 kg (190 lb)	29 – 25 May 1996
PG	15	(Uruguay)	Granger, Jayson	1.89 m (6 ft 2 in)	82 kg (181 lb)	36 – 15 September 1989
PG	31	(France)	Heurtel, Thomas	1.89 m (6 ft 2 in)	90.5 kg (200 lb)	37 – 10 April 1989
SG	33	(United States)	Diebler, Jon	1.98 m (6 ft 6 in)	93 kg (205 lb)	37 – 22 June 1988
C	41	(Turkey)	Koşut, Emircan	2.16 m (7 ft 1 in)	98 kg (216 lb)	30 – 3 July 1995
C	42	(United States)	Dunston, Bryant	2.03 m (6 ft 8 in)	114.4 kg (252 lb)	39 – 28 May 1986
C	44	(Turkey)	Düverioğlu, Ahmet	2.09 m (6 ft 10 in)		33 – 4 March 1993

Head coach

- (Serbia) Dušan Ivković

Assistant coach(es)

- (Greece) Vangelis Angelou
- (Turkey) Ahmet Çakı
- (Croatia) Tomislav Mijatović
- (Serbia) Djordje Adzic

Team manager

- (Turkey) Engin Özerhun

Legend

- (C) Team captain
- Injured

- Roster
Updated: 27 December 2014

=== Laboral Kutxa ===
Laboral Kutxa Baskonia roster
Players
Coaches

Pos.	No.	Nat.	Name	Ht.	Wt.	Age
PG	20	(United States)	Adams, Darius	1.83 m (6 ft 0 in)	75 kg (165 lb)	37 – 17 April 1989
G/F	11	(Slovenia)	Blažič, Jaka	1.96 m (6 ft 5 in)	96 kg (212 lb)	35 – 30 June 1990
F	42	(Latvia)	Bertāns, Dāvis	2.08 m (6 ft 10 in)	95 kg (209 lb)	33 – 12 November 1992
C	9	(Greece)	Bourousis, Ioannis	2.13 m (7 ft 0 in)	122 kg (269 lb)	42 – 17 November 1983
G	5	(France)	Causeur, Fabien (C)	1.93 m (6 ft 4 in)	90 kg (198 lb)	38 – 16 June 1987
G/F	33	(Spain)	Corbacho, Alberto	2.01 m (6 ft 7 in)	97 kg (214 lb)	41 – 1 October 1984
C	12	(Spain)	Diop, Ilimane	2.11 m (6 ft 11 in)	104 kg (229 lb)	31 – 4 April 1995
F	4	(Spain)	Diop, Mamadou (TP)	2.04 m (6 ft 8 in)	95 kg (209 lb)	33 – 14 February 1993
G/F	8	(Hungary)	Hanga, Ádám	2.01 m (6 ft 7 in)	93 kg (205 lb)	37 – 12 April 1989
G	3	(United States)	James, Mike	1.85 m (6 ft 1 in)	84 kg (185 lb)	35 – 18 August 1990
F	7	(Georgia (country))	Shengelia, Tornike (injured)	2.06 m (6 ft 9 in)	109 kg (240 lb)	34 – 5 October 1991
C	6	(Croatia)	Planinić, Darko	2.11 m (6 ft 11 in)	120 kg (265 lb)	35 – 22 November 1990
F/C	14	(France)	Tillie, Kim	2.11 m (6 ft 11 in)	105 kg (231 lb)	37 – 15 July 1988

Head coach

- (Croatia) Velimir Perasović

Assistant coach(es)

- (Spain) Agustí Julbe
- (Spain) David Gil

Legend

- (C) Team captain
- (TP) Training player
- Injured

- Roster
Updated: 22 November 2015

=== EA7 Milano ===
Olimpia Milano roster
Players
Coaches

Pos.	No.	Nat.	Name	Ht.	Wt.	Age
F/C	1	(United States)	McLean, Jamel	2.03 m (6 ft 8 in)	104 kg (229 lb)	38 – 18 April 1988
CG	3	(Croatia)	Lafayette, Oliver	1.88 m (6 ft 2 in)	84 kg (185 lb)	41 – 6 May 1984
G/F	5	(Italy)	Gentile, Alessandro	2.00 m (6 ft 7 in)	104 kg (229 lb)	33 – 12 November 1992
G/F	7	(Italy)	Cerella, Bruno	1.94 m (6 ft 4 in)	93 kg (205 lb)	39 – 30 July 1986
PG	9	(Lithuania)	Kalnietis, Mantas	1.95 m (6 ft 5 in)	93 kg (205 lb)	39 – 6 September 1986
F/C	13	(Serbia)	Mačvan, Milan	2.06 m (6 ft 9 in)	120 kg (265 lb)	36 – 16 November 1989
C	15	(Italy)	Magro, Daniele	2.08 m (6 ft 10 in)	109 kg (240 lb)	39 – 14 April 1987
PG	20	(Italy)	Cinciarini, Andrea	1.93 m (6 ft 4 in)	84 kg (185 lb)	39 – 21 June 1986
G/F	21	(United States)	Sanders, Rakim	1.93 m (6 ft 4 in)	95 kg (209 lb)	36 – 8 July 1989
SG	22	(United States)	Jenkins, Charles	1.91 m (6 ft 3 in)	100 kg (220 lb)	37 – 28 February 1989
C	27	(Croatia)	Barać, Stanko	2.17 m (7 ft 1 in)	127 kg (280 lb)	39 – 14 August 1986
G/F	43	(Croatia)	Simon, Krunoslav	1.97 m (6 ft 6 in)	100 kg (220 lb)	40 – 24 June 1985
C	51	(Uruguay)	Batista, Esteban	2.08 m (6 ft 10 in)	122 kg (269 lb)	42 – 2 September 1983

Head coach

- (Croatia) Jasmin Repeša

Assistant coach(es)

- (Italy) Mario Fioretti
- (Italy) Massimo Cancellieri

Athletic trainer(s)

- (Italy) Giustino Danesi

Legend

- (C) Team captain
- Injured

- Roster
Updated: 4 January 2016

=== Cedevita ===
KK Cedevita roster
Players
Coaches

Pos.	No.	Nat.	Name	Ht.	Wt.	Age
PG	0	(Georgia (country))	Pullen, Jacob	1.85 m (6 ft 1 in)	90 kg (198 lb)	36 – 10 November 1989
SF	4	(United States)	White, James	2.01 m (6 ft 7 in)	98 kg (216 lb)	43 – 21 October 1982
PG	6	(Croatia)	Katić, Toni	1.88 m (6 ft 2 in)	84 kg (185 lb)	33 – 9 July 1992
SG	8	(Croatia)	Pilepić, Fran	1.94 m (6 ft 4 in)	85 kg (187 lb)	36 – 5 May 1989
SF	9	(Croatia)	Babić, Luka	2.01 m (6 ft 7 in)	92 kg (203 lb)	34 – 29 September 1991
PF	11	(Croatia)	Žganec, Karlo	2.06 m (6 ft 9 in)	102 kg (225 lb)	30 – 25 July 1995
F	12	(United States)	Walker, Henry (injured)	1.98 m (6 ft 6 in)	102 kg (225 lb)	38 – 9 October 1987
SF	13	(Bosnia and Herzegovina)	Musa, Džanan	2.03 m (6 ft 8 in)	85 kg (187 lb)	26 – 8 May 1999
C	15	(Croatia)	Bilan, Miro	2.13 m (7 ft 0 in)	102 kg (225 lb)	36 – 21 July 1989
G/F	18	(Croatia)	Mazalin, Lovro	2.04 m (6 ft 8 in)	88 kg (194 lb)	28 – 28 June 1997
PG	20	(Bosnia and Herzegovina)	Gordić, Nemanja	1.93 m (6 ft 4 in)	90 kg (198 lb)	37 – 25 September 1988
C	21	(Croatia)	Žorić, Luka	2.11 m (6 ft 11 in)	105 kg (231 lb)	41 – 5 November 1984
C	34	(Croatia)	Lončar, Markus	2.11 m (6 ft 11 in)	100 kg (220 lb)	30 – 8 April 1996
F/C	35	(Croatia)	Arapović, Marko	2.07 m (6 ft 9 in)	105 kg (231 lb)	29 – 20 July 1996
SF	44	(Croatia)	Vučić, Ivan	1.97 m (6 ft 6 in)	92 kg (203 lb)	29 – 28 October 1996

Head coach

- (Croatia) Veljko Mršić

Assistant coach(es)

- (Italy) Gianmarco Pozzecco
- (Croatia) Dražen Orešković
- (Croatia) Dino Repeša

Strength & conditioning coach(es)

- (Croatia) Slaven Hlupić

Physiotherapist(s)

- (Croatia) Petar Leko
- (Croatia) Slaven Durlen

Team manager

- (Croatia) Mate Skelin

Legend

- (C) Team captain
- Injured

- Roster
Updated: 7 January 2016

=== Limoges ===
Limoges CSP roster
Players
Coaches

Pos.	No.	Nat.	Name	Ht.	Wt.	Age
G	0	(Germany)	Schaffartzik, Heiko	1.83 m (6 ft 0 in)	83 kg (183 lb)	42 – 3 January 1984
PG	4	(North Macedonia)	McCalebb, Bo	1.83 m (6 ft 0 in)	83 kg (183 lb)	40 – 4 May 1985
F	5	(France)	Wojciechowski, Mathieu	2.03 m (6 ft 8 in)	90 kg (198 lb)	33 – 20 October 1992
PF	6	(United States)	Daniels, Will	2.03 m (6 ft 8 in)	104 kg (229 lb)	40 – 21 April 1986
G/F	8	(United States)	Gatens, Matt	1.96 m (6 ft 5 in)	95 kg (209 lb)	36 – 13 June 1989
PG	9	(France)	Westermann, Léo	1.98 m (6 ft 6 in)	86 kg (190 lb)	33 – 24 July 1992
G/F	11	(United States)	Payne, Mark	2.03 m (6 ft 8 in)	104 kg (229 lb)	37 – 17 June 1988
F/C	12	(France)	Camara, Ousmane	2.04 m (6 ft 8 in)		36 – 12 May 1989
C	14	(Burkina Faso)	Zerbo, Fréjus	2.08 m (6 ft 10 in)	122 kg (269 lb)	37 – 2 April 1989
SF	16	(France)	Boungou Colo, Nobel	2.02 m (6 ft 8 in)	90 kg (198 lb)	38 – 26 April 1988
C	18	(France)	Traoré, Ali	2.08 m (6 ft 10 in)	113 kg (249 lb)	41 – 28 February 1985
SF	29	(France)	Diawara, Yakhouba	2.01 m (6 ft 7 in)	102 kg (225 lb)	43 – 29 August 1982

Head coach

- (Serbia) Duško Vujošević

Assistant coach(es)

- (France) Bertrand Parvaud
- (France) Jim Bilba

Legend

- (C) Team captain
- Injured

- Roster
Updated: 1 October 2015

== Group C ==
=== FC Barcelona Lassa ===
FC Barcelona Lassa roster
Players
Coaches

Pos.	No.	Nat.	Name	Ht.	Wt.	Age
G/F	10	(Spain)	Abrines, Álex	1.98 m (6 ft 6 in)	86 kg (190 lb)	32 – 1 August 1993
PG	30	(Puerto Rico)	Arroyo, Carlos	1.88 m (6 ft 2 in)	84 kg (185 lb)	46 – 30 July 1979
C	21	(Senegal)	Diagne, Moussa	2.11 m (6 ft 11 in)	103 kg (227 lb)	32 – 6 March 1994
PF	5	(United States)	Doellman, Justin	2.08 m (6 ft 10 in)	102 kg (225 lb)	41 – 3 February 1985
C	6	(United States)	Dorsey, Joey	2.03 m (6 ft 8 in)	129 kg (284 lb)	42 – 16 December 1983
G/F	20	(Sweden)	Eriksson, Marcus	2.00 m (6 ft 7 in)	89 kg (196 lb)	32 – 5 December 1993
C	9	(Nigeria)	Lawal, Shane (injured)	2.08 m (6 ft 10 in)	105 kg (231 lb)	39 – 8 October 1986
SG	11	(Spain)	Navarro, Juan Carlos (C)	1.92 m (6 ft 4 in)	90.5 kg (200 lb)	45 – 13 June 1980
SG	24	(United States)	Oleson, Brad	1.91 m (6 ft 3 in)	90.5 kg (200 lb)	43 – 11 April 1983
SF	33	(Greece)	Perperoglou, Stratos	2.03 m (6 ft 8 in)	104 kg (229 lb)	41 – 7 August 1984
SG	8	(Spain)	Ribas, Pau	1.96 m (6 ft 5 in)	95 kg (209 lb)	39 – 2 March 1987
F/C	23	(Jamaica)	Samuels, Samardo	2.06 m (6 ft 9 in)	118 kg (260 lb)	37 – 9 January 1989
PG	13	(Czech Republic)	Satoranský, Tomáš	1.99 m (6 ft 6 in)	86 kg (190 lb)	34 – 30 October 1991
C	44	(Croatia)	Tomić, Ante	2.18 m (7 ft 2 in)	120 kg (265 lb)	39 – 17 February 1987
F	14	(Bulgaria)	Vezenkov, Aleksandar	2.06 m (6 ft 9 in)	102 kg (225 lb)	30 – 6 August 1995

Head coach

- (Spain) Xavier Pascual

Assistant coach(es)

- (Spain) Iñigo Zorzano
- (Spain) David García
- (Spain) Oriol Pagès

Legend

- (C) Team captain
- Injured

- Roster
Updated: 19 February 2016

=== Panathinaikos ===
Panathinaikos B.C. roster
Players
Coaches

Pos.	No.	Nat.	Name	Ht.	Wt.	Age
G	0	(Georgia (country))	Haynes, MarQuez	1.88 m (6 ft 2 in)	84 kg (185 lb)	39 – 19 December 1986
F	5	(Greece)	Charalampopoulos, Vassilis	2.05 m (6 ft 9 in)	107 kg (236 lb)	29 – 6 January 1997
PG	6	(Greece)	Koniaris, Antonis	1.96 m (6 ft 5 in)	86 kg (190 lb)	28 – 30 September 1997
G	7	(Greece)	Bochoridis, Lefteris	1.96 m (6 ft 5 in)	91 kg (201 lb)	32 – 7 April 1994
SF	8	(Greece)	Janković, Vladimir (injured)	2.02 m (6 ft 8 in)	100 kg (220 lb)	36 – 3 March 1990
PF	9	(Greece)	Fotsis, Antonis	2.09 m (6 ft 10 in)	113.4 kg (250 lb)	45 – 1 April 1981
C	10	(Serbia)	Raduljica, Miroslav	2.13 m (7 ft 0 in)	116 kg (256 lb)	38 – 5 January 1988
SG	11	(Greece)	Pappas, Nikos	1.95 m (6 ft 5 in)	98 kg (216 lb)	35 – 11 July 1990
SG	12	(Dominican Republic)	Feldeine, James	1.93 m (6 ft 4 in)	91 kg (201 lb)	37 – 26 June 1988
PG	13	(Greece)	Diamantidis, Dimitris (C)	1.96 m (6 ft 5 in)	88 kg (194 lb)	45 – 6 May 1980
PF	14	(United States)	Gist, James	2.06 m (6 ft 9 in)	106.5 kg (235 lb)	39 – 26 October 1986
PG	15	(Greece)	Calathes, Nick	1.98 m (6 ft 6 in)	97 kg (214 lb)	37 – 7 February 1989
SG	16	(Greece)	Kalaitzakis, Georgios	1.95 m (6 ft 5 in)	73 kg (161 lb)	27 – 2 January 1999
PG	16	(Greece)	Papadakis, Kostas	1.91 m (6 ft 3 in)	78 kg (172 lb)	27 – 27 September 1998
C	19	(Greece)	Papagiannis, Georgios (injured)	2.18 m (7 ft 2 in)	125 kg (276 lb)	28 – 3 July 1997
G	20	(Greece)	Lountzis, Michalis	1.95 m (6 ft 5 in)	90 kg (198 lb)	27 – 4 August 1998
SG	22	(United States)	Williams, Elliot	1.96 m (6 ft 5 in)	86 kg (190 lb)	36 – 20 June 1989
F/C	32	(United States)	Hunter, Vince	2.03 m (6 ft 8 in)	94 kg (207 lb)	31 – 5 August 1994

Head coach

- (Greece) Argyris Pedoulakis

Assistant coach(es)

- (Greece) Diamantis Panagiotopoulos
- (Greece) Kostas Tsartsaris
- (Greece) Nikos Pappas

Athletic trainer(s)

- (Greece) Savvas Aronis

Team manager

- (Greece) Fragiskos Alvertis

Legend

- (C) Team captain
- Injured

- Roster
Updated: 2 November 2015

=== Lokomotiv Kuban ===
PBC Lokomotiv-Kuban roster
Players
Coaches

Pos.	No.	Nat.	Name	Ht.	Wt.	Age
G	0	(United States)	Delaney, Malcolm	1.91 m (6 ft 3 in)	86 kg (190 lb)	37 – 11 March 1989
F	1	(United States)	Singleton, Chris	2.06 m (6 ft 9 in)	103 kg (227 lb)	36 – 21 November 1989
F/C	3	(United States)	Randolph, Anthony	2.11 m (6 ft 11 in)	102 kg (225 lb)	36 – 15 July 1989
PG	4	(Croatia)	Draper, Dontaye	1.80 m (5 ft 11 in)	82 kg (181 lb)	41 – 10 August 1984
F/C	5	(Russia)	Kanygin, Igor	2.07 m (6 ft 9 in)		31 – 30 June 1994
F	9	(Spain)	Claver, Víctor	2.06 m (6 ft 9 in)	102 kg (225 lb)	37 – 30 August 1988
PG	10	(Russia)	Bykov, Sergei	1.90 m (6 ft 3 in)	92 kg (203 lb)	43 – 26 February 1983
SG	12	(United States)	Janning, Matt	1.96 m (6 ft 5 in)	88 kg (194 lb)	37 – 22 June 1988
PG	15	(Russia)	Kolyushkin, Maxim	1.92 m (6 ft 4 in)	73 kg (161 lb)	35 – 11 December 1990
PF	17	(Russia)	Balashov, Nikita	2.07 m (6 ft 9 in)	96 kg (212 lb)	34 – 19 June 1991
SG	18	(Russia)	Voronov, Evgeny	1.93 m (6 ft 4 in)	95 kg (209 lb)	39 – 7 May 1986
PF	20	(Russia)	Zubkov, Andrey	2.05 m (6 ft 9 in)	89 kg (196 lb)	34 – 29 June 1991
SF	45	(Australia)	Broekhoff, Ryan	2.01 m (6 ft 7 in)	98 kg (216 lb)	35 – 23 August 1990

Head coach

- (Greece) Georgios Bartzokas

Assistant coach(es)

- (Greece) Christos Pappas
- (Serbia) Saša Grujić

Legend

- (C) Team captain
- Injured

- Roster
Updated: 15 February 2016

=== Žalgiris ===
BC Žalgiris roster
Players
Coaches

Pos.	No.	Nat.	Name	Ht.	Wt.	Age
PG	2	(Ukraine)	Randle, Jerome	1.75 m (5 ft 9 in)	77 kg (170 lb)	38 – 21 May 1987
F	3	(Estonia)	Vene, Siim-Sander	2.03 m (6 ft 8 in)	97 kg (214 lb)	35 – 12 November 1990
PG	4	(Lithuania)	Lekavičius, Lukas	1.83 m (6 ft 0 in)	76 kg (168 lb)	32 – 30 March 1994
G/F	7	(Lithuania)	Pocius, Martynas	1.96 m (6 ft 5 in)	89 kg (196 lb)	40 – 28 April 1986
SG	10	(Lithuania)	Seibutis, Renaldas	1.98 m (6 ft 6 in)	84 kg (185 lb)	40 – 23 July 1985
PF	12	(Australia)	Motum, Brock	2.08 m (6 ft 10 in)	111 kg (245 lb)	35 – 16 October 1990
PF	13	(Lithuania)	Jankūnas, Paulius (C)	2.05 m (6 ft 9 in)	107 kg (236 lb)	42 – 29 April 1984
C	14	(Greece)	Vougioukas, Ian	2.11 m (6 ft 11 in)	127 kg (280 lb)	40 – 31 May 1985
C	15	(Lithuania)	Javtokas, Robertas (injured)	2.11 m (6 ft 11 in)	117 kg (258 lb)	46 – 20 March 1980
C	18	(Lithuania)	Sajus, Martynas	2.07 m (6 ft 9 in)	112 kg (247 lb)	30 – 22 February 1996
SF	19	(Lithuania)	Lipkevičius, Vytenis (injured)	1.98 m (6 ft 6 in)	98 kg (216 lb)	36 – 19 May 1989
G	20	(Latvia)	Vecvagars, Kaspars	1.93 m (6 ft 4 in)	83 kg (183 lb)	32 – 3 August 1993
G	21	(Canada)	Hanlan, Olivier	1.93 m (6 ft 4 in)	86 kg (190 lb)	33 – 15 February 1993
PF	55	(Germany)	Hartenstein, Isaiah	2.09 m (6 ft 10 in)	100 kg (220 lb)	27 – 5 May 1998
SF	92	(Lithuania)	Ulanovas, Edgaras	1.98 m (6 ft 6 in)	94 kg (207 lb)	34 – 7 January 1992

Head coach

- (Lithuania) Šarūnas Jasikevičius

Assistant coach(es)

- (Lithuania) Darius Maskoliūnas
- (Lithuania) Darius Songaila
- (Lithuania) Evaldas Beržininkaitis

Athletic trainer(s)

- (Lithuania) Nerijus Navickas
- (Lithuania) Justinas Grainys

Physiotherapist(s)

- (Lithuania) Paulius Jacikas

Team manager

- (Lithuania) Paulius Motiejūnas

Legend

- (C) Team captain
- Injured

- Roster
Updated: 26 August 2015

=== Pınar Karşıyaka ===
Pınar Karşıyaka roster
Players
Coaches

Pos.	No.	Nat.	Name	Ht.	Wt.	Age
G	2	(United States)	Wright, Bracey	1.91 m (6 ft 3 in)	95 kg (209 lb)	41 – 1 July 1984
C	3	(Colombia)	Palacios, Juan (injured)	2.06 m (6 ft 9 in)	111 kg (245 lb)	40 – 11 May 1985
C	4	(United States)	Iverson, Colton	2.13 m (7 ft 0 in)	116 kg (256 lb)	36 – 29 June 1989
PG	5	(Turkey)	Baygül, Muhammed	1.91 m (6 ft 3 in)	84 kg (185 lb)	33 – 3 June 1992
PF	6	(Turkey)	Geyik, Samet	2.06 m (6 ft 9 in)	98 kg (216 lb)	33 – 12 January 1993
C	9	(Turkey)	Güven, Egemen	2.11 m (6 ft 11 in)	100 kg (220 lb)	29 – 25 September 1996
G	10	(Turkey)	Altıntığ, Can	1.95 m (6 ft 5 in)	92 kg (203 lb)	39 – 1 January 1987
F	12	(Turkey)	Koç, İnanç (C)	2.02 m (6 ft 8 in)	103 kg (227 lb)	47 – 9 February 1979
SF	16	(New Zealand)	Abercrombie, Thomas	1.98 m (6 ft 6 in)	94 kg (207 lb)	38 – 5 July 1987
PG	17	(United States)	Jones, Lazeric (injured)	1.85 m (6 ft 1 in)	84 kg (185 lb)	35 – 11 August 1990
F/C	21	(Turkey)	Gönlüm, Kerem	2.08 m (6 ft 10 in)	108 kg (238 lb)	48 – 22 November 1977
PF	22	(United States)	Gabriel, Kenny	2.06 m (6 ft 9 in)	102 kg (225 lb)	36 – 3 July 1989
PG	25	(Turkey)	Sipahi, Kenan	1.97 m (6 ft 6 in)	88 kg (194 lb)	30 – 26 May 1995
PG	34	(Turkey)	Şentürk, Soner	1.92 m (6 ft 4 in)	91 kg (201 lb)	39 – 7 August 1986

Head coach

- (Turkey) Ufuk Sarıca

Assistant coach(es)

- (Turkey) Servet Özsüner
- (Turkey) Arda Demirbağ

Strength & conditioning coach(es)

- (Turkey) Tolga Altun
- (Turkey) Sertaç Kuru

Team manager

- (Turkey) Selim Çınar

Legend

- (C) Team captain
- Injured

- Roster
Updated: 25 March 2016

=== Stelmet Zielona Góra ===
Basket Zielona Góra roster
Players
Coaches

Pos.	No.	Nat.	Name	Ht.	Wt.	Age
PG	1	(United States)	Bost, Dee	1.89 m (6 ft 2 in)	80 kg (176 lb)	36 – 12 October 1989
G	2	(United States)	Reynolds, J. R.	1.88 m (6 ft 2 in)	90 kg (198 lb)	41 – 9 May 1984
PG	7	(Poland)	Zywert, Kamil	1.88 m (6 ft 2 in)	77 kg (170 lb)	30 – 24 February 1996
F/C	10	(Poland)	Szewczyk, Szymon	2.08 m (6 ft 10 in)	110 kg (243 lb)	43 – 21 December 1982
PG	11	(Poland)	Ponitka, Marcel	1.90 m (6 ft 3 in)	84 kg (185 lb)	28 – 28 August 1997
PF	14	(Romania)	Moldoveanu, Vlad (injured)	2.06 m (6 ft 9 in)	105 kg (231 lb)	38 – 11 February 1988
G/F	20	(Poland)	Ponitka, Mateusz	1.98 m (6 ft 6 in)	93 kg (205 lb)	32 – 29 August 1993
G/F	33	(Poland)	Gruszecki, Karol	1.96 m (6 ft 5 in)	91 kg (201 lb)	36 – 4 November 1989
C	34	(Poland)	Hrycaniuk, Adam	2.06 m (6 ft 9 in)	110 kg (243 lb)	41 – 14 May 1984
G/F	35	(Poland)	Zamojski, Przemysław	1.93 m (6 ft 4 in)	93 kg (205 lb)	39 – 14 December 1986
F/C	41	(Serbia)	Borovnjak, Dejan	2.08 m (6 ft 10 in)	104 kg (229 lb)	40 – 1 April 1986
PF	42	(Montenegro)	Đurišić, Nemanja	2.03 m (6 ft 8 in)	105 kg (231 lb)	34 – 23 February 1992
PG	55	(Poland)	Koszarek, Łukasz	1.87 m (6 ft 2 in)	91 kg (201 lb)	42 – 12 January 1984

Head coach

- (Slovenia) Saso Filipovski

Assistant coach(es)

- (Poland) Andrzej Adamek
- (Poland) Artur Gronek

Athletic trainer(s)

- (Poland) Witold Szachowicz

Legend

- (C) Team captain
- (DP) Development player
- Injured

- Roster
Updated: 4 October 2015

== Group D ==
=== CSKA Moscow ===
PBC CSKA Moscow roster
Players
Coaches

Pos.	No.	Nat.	Name	Ht.	Wt.	Age
G	1	(France)	de Colo, Nando	1.96 m (6 ft 5 in)	91 kg (201 lb)	38 – 23 June 1987
SF	2	(Russia)	Astapkovich, Anton	2.02 m (6 ft 8 in)	98 kg (216 lb)	32 – 29 January 1994
G	3	(Russia)	Kulagin, Dmitry	1.97 m (6 ft 6 in)	89 kg (196 lb)	33 – 1 July 1992
PG	4	(Serbia)	Teodosić, Miloš	1.95 m (6 ft 5 in)	87 kg (192 lb)	39 – 19 March 1987
SG	7	(Russia)	Fridzon, Vitaly	1.96 m (6 ft 5 in)	81 kg (179 lb)	40 – 14 October 1985
F	8	(United States)	Nichols, Demetris (injured)	2.02 m (6 ft 8 in)	96 kg (212 lb)	41 – 4 September 1984
PG	9	(United States)	Jackson, Aaron	1.90 m (6 ft 3 in)	83 kg (183 lb)	39 – 6 May 1986
C	12	(Russia)	Korobkov, Pavel	2.06 m (6 ft 9 in)	99 kg (218 lb)	36 – 18 October 1989
C	13	(Russia)	Lazarev, Ivan	2.10 m (6 ft 11 in)	103 kg (227 lb)	35 – 31 January 1991
C	19	(United Kingdom)	Freeland, Joel	2.08 m (6 ft 10 in)	102 kg (225 lb)	39 – 7 February 1987
PF	20	(Russia)	Vorontsevich, Andrey	2.07 m (6 ft 9 in)	107 kg (236 lb)	38 – 17 July 1987
G/F	22	(United States)	Higgins, Cory	1.96 m (6 ft 5 in)	82 kg (181 lb)	36 – 14 June 1989
G	30	(Russia)	Kulagin, Mikhail	1.91 m (6 ft 3 in)	87 kg (192 lb)	31 – 4 August 1994
PF	31	(Russia)	Khryapa, Victor (injured)	2.06 m (6 ft 9 in)	107 kg (236 lb)	43 – 3 August 1982
F	41	(Russia)	Kurbanov, Nikita	2.03 m (6 ft 8 in)	109 kg (240 lb)	39 – 5 October 1986
F/C	42	(United States)	Hines, Kyle	1.98 m (6 ft 6 in)	111 kg (245 lb)	39 – 2 September 1986

Head coach

- (Greece) Dimitrios Itoudis

Assistant coach(es)

- (United States) Darryl Middleton
- (Greece) Andreas Pistiolis
- (Russia) Anton Yudin

Athletic trainer(s)

- (Greece) Kostas Chatzichristos
- (Russia) Eugeniy Burin

Physiotherapist(s)

- (Russia) Asker Barcho

Team manager

- (Russia) Vasiliy Kozlovtsev

Legend

- (C) Team captain
- Injured

- Roster
Updated: 9 June 2015

=== Maccabi Tel Aviv ===
Maccabi Tel Aviv B.C. roster
Players
Coaches

Pos.	No.	Nat.	Name	Ht.	Wt.	Age
PF	3	(Croatia)	Bender, Dragan	2.13 m (7 ft 0 in)	95 kg (209 lb)	28 – 17 November 1997
C	5	(United States) (North Macedonia)	Hendrix, Richard	2.03 m (6 ft 8 in)	118 kg (260 lb)	39 – 15 November 1986
SF	6	(United States)	Smith, Devin	1.98 m (6 ft 6 in)	106.5 kg (235 lb)	43 – 12 April 1983
PF	7	(United States)	Randle, Brian	2.03 m (6 ft 8 in)	100 kg (220 lb)	41 – 8 February 1985
SG	8	(Israel)	Yivzori, Dagan	1.93 m (6 ft 4 in)	90 kg (198 lb)	40 – 15 October 1985
F	9	(Israel)	Segev, Itay	2.04 m (6 ft 8 in)	87 kg (192 lb)	30 – 15 June 1995
SF	10	(Israel)	Pnini, Guy (C)	2.01 m (6 ft 7 in)	99 kg (218 lb)	42 – 4 September 1983
PG	12	(Israel)	Ohayon, Yogev	1.89 m (6 ft 2 in)	86 kg (190 lb)	39 – 24 April 1987
PG	13	(Israel)	Paz, Idan	1.97 m (6 ft 6 in)	90 kg (198 lb)	27 – 12 May 1998
SG	14	(Israel)	Zoosman, Yovel	1.86 m (6 ft 1 in)	90 kg (198 lb)	31 – 21 January 1995
G/F	15	(United States) (Israel)	Landesberg, Sylven	1.98 m (6 ft 6 in)	95.4 kg (210 lb)	36 – 10 April 1990
PF	21	(United States) (Nigeria)	Ofoegbu, Ike	2.05 m (6 ft 9 in)	102 kg (225 lb)	41 – 9 November 1984
G	22	(United States) (Israel)	Rochestie, Taylor	1.85 m (6 ft 1 in)	88 kg (194 lb)	40 – 1 July 1985
F/C	32	(United States)	Mbakwe, Trevor	2.07 m (6 ft 9 in)	111 kg (245 lb)	37 – 24 January 1989
PG	99	(Israel)	Mekel, Gal	1.91 m (6 ft 3 in)	87 kg (192 lb)	38 – 4 March 1988

Head coach

- (Croatia) Žan Tabak

Assistant coach(es)

- (Israel) Avi Even
- (Israel) Rafi Bogatin

Athletic trainer(s)

- (Israel) Regev Fanan

Team manager

- (Croatia) Nikola Vujčić

Legend

- (C) Team captain
- Injured

- Roster
Updated: 21 October 2015

=== Unicaja ===
Unicaja roster
Players
Coaches

Pos.	No.	Nat.	Name	Ht.	Wt.	Age
PF	45	(United States)	Cooley, Jack	2.06 m (6 ft 9 in)	112 kg (247 lb)	35 – 4 April 1991
PG	4	(Spain)	Díaz, Alberto	1.88 m (6 ft 2 in)	86 kg (190 lb)	32 – 23 April 1994
SF	11	(Spain)	Díez, Dani	2.03 m (6 ft 8 in)	100 kg (220 lb)	33 – 7 April 1993
SG	1	(France)	Jackson, Edwin	1.91 m (6 ft 3 in)	91 kg (201 lb)	36 – 18 September 1989
F	19	(Lithuania)	Kuzminskas, Mindaugas	2.05 m (6 ft 9 in)	98 kg (216 lb)	36 – 19 October 1989
PG	9	(Serbia)	Marković, Stefan (injured)	1.99 m (6 ft 6 in)	98 kg (216 lb)	38 – 25 April 1988
G	16	(Serbia)	Nedović, Nemanja	1.91 m (6 ft 3 in)	87 kg (192 lb)	34 – 16 June 1991
PG	20	(United States)	Nelson, DeMarcus	1.93 m (6 ft 4 in)	91 kg (201 lb)	40 – 2 November 1985
SG	15	(United States)	Smith, Jamar (injured)	1.91 m (6 ft 3 in)	84 kg (185 lb)	39 – 7 April 1987
PF	12	(Spain)	Suárez, Carlos	2.03 m (6 ft 8 in)	106 kg (234 lb)	39 – 23 May 1986
PF	10	(Georgia (country))	Thomas, Will	2.03 m (6 ft 8 in)	104 kg (229 lb)	39 – 1 July 1986
C	17	(Spain)	Vázquez, Fran (C)	2.09 m (6 ft 10 in)	109 kg (240 lb)	43 – 1 May 1983

Head coach

- (Spain) Joan Plaza

Assistant coach(es)

- (Spain) Antonio Herrera
- (Spain) Ángel Sánchez-Cañete
- (Spain) Carlos Jiménez

Legend

- (C) Team captain
- Injured

- Roster
Updated: 23 December 2015

=== Brose Baskets ===
Brose Baskets roster
Players
Coaches

Pos.	No.	Nat.	Name	Ht.	Wt.	Age
PF	4	(Italy)	Melli, Nicolò	2.05 m (6 ft 9 in)	100 kg (220 lb)	35 – 26 January 1991
CG	6	(Greece)	Zisis, Nikos	1.97 m (6 ft 6 in)	98 kg (216 lb)	42 – 16 August 1983
PG	7	(Slovenia)	Nikolić, Aleksej	1.91 m (6 ft 3 in)	92 kg (203 lb)	31 – 21 February 1995
SG	8	(Germany)	Staiger, Lucca	1.96 m (6 ft 5 in)	93 kg (205 lb)	37 – 14 June 1988
F/C	10	(Germany)	Theis, Daniel	2.04 m (6 ft 8 in)	108 kg (238 lb)	34 – 4 April 1992
G	11	(United States)	Wanamaker, Brad	1.93 m (6 ft 4 in)	95 kg (209 lb)	36 – 25 July 1989
G	12	(Germany)	Müller, Malik	1.90 m (6 ft 3 in)	98 kg (216 lb)	32 – 24 January 1994
PG	13	(Latvia)	Strēlnieks, Jānis	1.91 m (6 ft 3 in)	84 kg (185 lb)	36 – 1 September 1989
F	20	(Germany)	Harris, Elias	2.03 m (6 ft 8 in)	108 kg (238 lb)	36 – 6 July 1989
SF	21	(United States)	Miller, Darius	2.03 m (6 ft 8 in)	102 kg (225 lb)	36 – 21 March 1990
G	33	(Germany)	Heckmann, Patrick	1.98 m (6 ft 6 in)	89 kg (196 lb)	34 – 27 February 1992
C	34	(Germany)	Idbihi, Yassin	2.08 m (6 ft 10 in)	118 kg (260 lb)	42 – 24 July 1983
C	43	(Croatia)	Radošević, Leon	2.09 m (6 ft 10 in)	102 kg (225 lb)	36 – 26 February 1990

Head coach

- (Italy) Andrea Trinchieri

Assistant coach(es)

- (Greece) Ilias Kantzouris
- (Italy) Sandro Bencardino

Legend

- (C) Team captain
- (DP) Development player
- Injured

- Roster
Updated: 17 November 2015

=== Darüşşafaka Doğuş ===
Darüşşafaka Doğuş roster
Players
Coaches

Pos.	No.	Nat.	Name	Ht.	Wt.	Age
PG	1	(United States)	Wilbekin, Scottie	1.88 m (6 ft 2 in)	80 kg (176 lb)	33 – 5 April 1993
PG	4	(Turkey)	Yağmur, Mehmet (injured)	1.87 m (6 ft 2 in)	85 kg (187 lb)	38 – 1 July 1987
G/F	5	(United States)	Redding, Reggie	1.96 m (6 ft 5 in)	95 kg (209 lb)	37 – 18 July 1988
PF	7	(Turkey)	Türen, Metin	2.06 m (6 ft 9 in)		31 – 2 May 1994
PF	8	(Turkey)	Geyik, Samet	2.06 m (6 ft 9 in)	98 kg (216 lb)	33 – 12 January 1993
C	9	(Turkey)	Erden, Semih	2.13 m (7 ft 0 in)	109 kg (240 lb)	39 – 28 July 1986
PG	10	(Turkey)	Özdemiroğlu, Doğuş	1.91 m (6 ft 3 in)		30 – 17 April 1996
G/F	11	(Georgia (country))	Markoishvili, Manuchar	1.97 m (6 ft 6 in)	95 kg (209 lb)	39 – 17 November 1986
G/F	15	(Turkey)	Çetin, Serhat	1.97 m (6 ft 6 in)	94 kg (207 lb)	40 – 23 February 1986
PF	19	(Turkey)	Aldemir, Furkan	2.08 m (6 ft 10 in)	109 kg (240 lb)	34 – 9 August 1991
C	21	(Turkey)	Savaş, Oğuz	2.13 m (7 ft 0 in)	132 kg (291 lb)	38 – 13 July 1987
CG	22	(United States)	Gordon, Jamon	1.91 m (6 ft 3 in)	98 kg (216 lb)	41 – 14 July 1984
PG	33	(Turkey)	Arslan, Ender	1.90 m (6 ft 3 in)	82 kg (181 lb)	43 – 13 January 1983
F/C	35	(Turkey)	Dudley, Erwin (DC)	2.04 m (6 ft 8 in)	111 kg (245 lb)	44 – 2 October 1981
F/C	42	(United States)	Slaughter, Marcus	2.03 m (6 ft 8 in)	104 kg (229 lb)	41 – 18 March 1985
PF	44	(United States)	Harangody, Luke	2.03 m (6 ft 8 in)	109 kg (240 lb)	38 – 2 January 1988
PF	51	(Montenegro)	Bjelica, Milko	2.07 m (6 ft 9 in)	102 kg (225 lb)	41 – 4 June 1984
G/F	55	(Turkey)	Preldžić, Emir (DC)	2.06 m (6 ft 9 in)	100 kg (220 lb)	38 – 6 September 1987

Head coach

- (Turkey) Oktay Mahmuti

Assistant coach(es)

- (Turkey) Recep Şen
- (Turkey) Ömer Uğurata

Strength & conditioning coach(es)

- (Turkey) Yücel Aslan
- (Turkey) Murat Çağlar

Team manager

- (Turkey) İbrahim Kutluay
- (Turkey) Ahmet Eran

Legend

- (C) Team captain
- (DC) Dual citizenship
- Injured

- Roster
Updated: 30 December 2015

=== Dinamo Sassari ===
Dinamo Sassari roster
Players
Coaches

Pos.	No.	Nat.	Name	Ht.	Wt.	Age
PF	1	(United States)	Petway, Brent	2.05 m (6 ft 9 in)	102 kg (225 lb)	40 – 12 May 1985
G	3	(Poland)	Logan, David	1.85 m (6 ft 1 in)	77 kg (170 lb)	43 – 26 December 1982
G/F	5	(Italy)	Formenti, Matteo	1.94 m (6 ft 4 in)	90 kg (198 lb)	44 – 15 April 1982
G/F	8	(Italy)	Devecchi, Giacomo (C)	1.96 m (6 ft 5 in)	88 kg (194 lb)	41 – 2 April 1985
F	9	(United States)	Alexander, Joe	2.03 m (6 ft 8 in)	102 kg (225 lb)	39 – 26 December 1986
PG	10	(Italy)	D'Ercole, Lorenzo	1.93 m (6 ft 4 in)	88 kg (194 lb)	38 – 11 February 1988
C	11	(Italy)	Marconato, Denis	2.11 m (6 ft 11 in)	115 kg (254 lb)	50 – 29 July 1975
F	14	(Italy)	Sacchetti, Brian	2.00 m (6 ft 7 in)	100 kg (220 lb)	39 – 4 May 1986
PG	16	(Nigeria)	Akognon, Josh	1.80 m (5 ft 11 in)	84 kg (185 lb)	40 – 10 February 1986
PG	24	(Croatia)	Stipčević, Rok	1.86 m (6 ft 1 in)	82 kg (181 lb)	39 – 20 May 1986
C	32	(United States)	Varnado, Jarvis	2.06 m (6 ft 9 in)	104 kg (229 lb)	38 – 1 March 1988
PF	35	(United States)	Kadji, Kenny	2.11 m (6 ft 11 in)	110 kg (243 lb)	37 – 19 May 1988

Head coach

- (Italy) Federico Pasquini

Assistant coach(es)

- (Italy) Paolo Citrini
- (Italy) Massimo Maffezzoli

Legend

- (C) Team captain
- Injured

- Roster
Updated: 14 March 2016
