= EuroLeague historical league formats =

League format

The EuroLeague historical league formats are the different league formats over the years, of the top-tier level European-wide men's professional club basketball league, the EuroLeague.

== EuroLeague historical formats ==
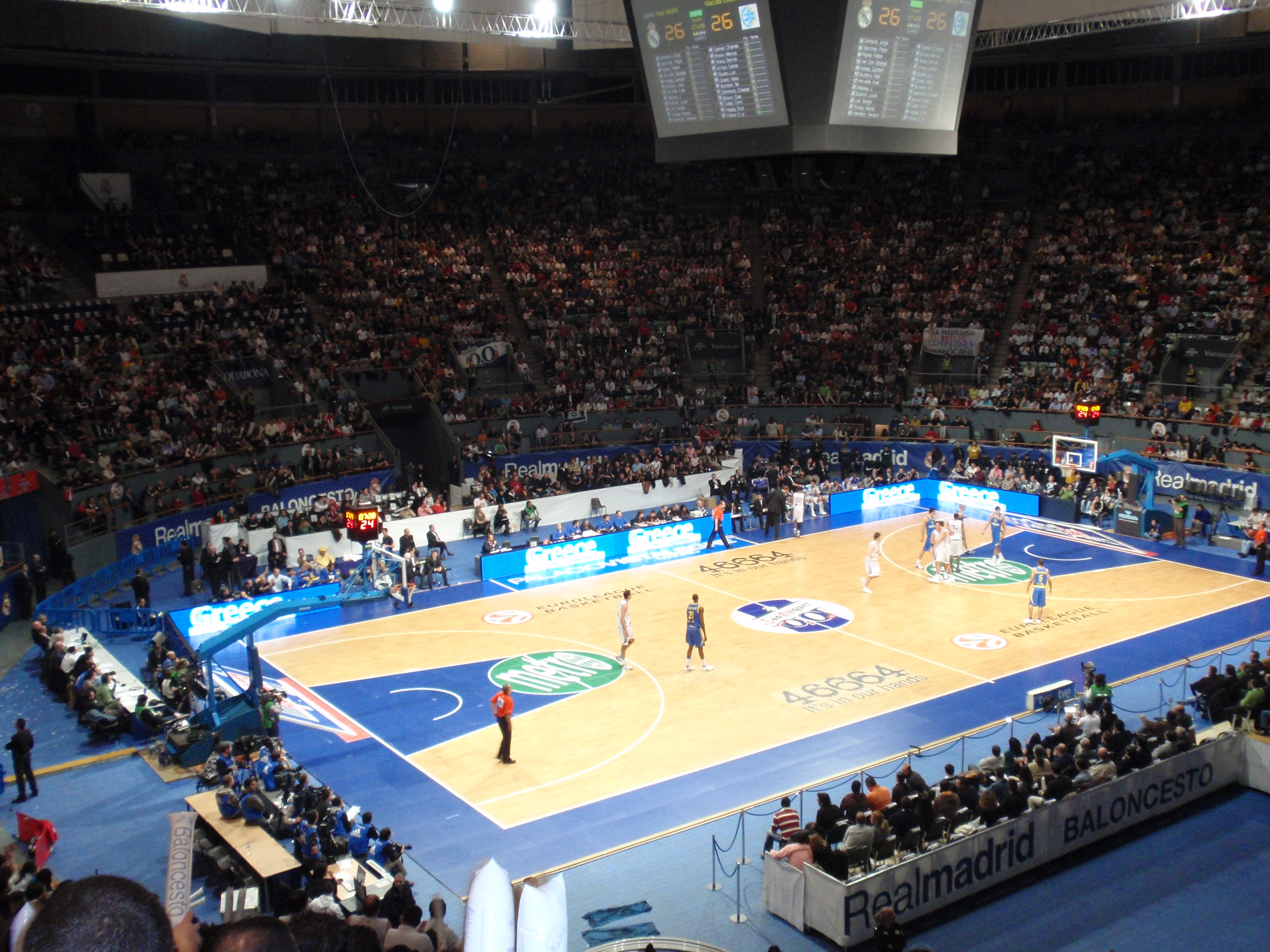
A EuroLeague game in Madrid, in 2009.

Starting with the EuroLeague 2009–10 season, the EuroLeague's first phase was the Qualifying Rounds, which involved eight clubs bracketed into a knockout tournament consisting of two-legged matches. The four survivors of the first qualifying round were paired against one another for the second qualifying round, with the two winners playing for the last spot in the EuroLeague Regular Season. All losing clubs in the qualifying rounds parachuted down into Euroleague Basketball's second-tier level competition, the EuroCup.

The next phase of the old format was the Regular Season, in which 24 teams participated; from the 2009–10 season to the 2015–16 season, the participants included 23 or 24 clubs automatically entered into the Regular Season, depending on if there was a Qualifying Round winner. Each team played two games (home-and-away) against every other team in its group. At the end of the Regular Season, the field was cut from 24 teams to 16 teams. Before the 2008–09 season, the teams were divided into three groups of eight teams each, with the top five teams in each group, plus the top sixth-place finisher advancing. After that, the Regular Season involved four groups with six teams each, with the first four teams in each group advancing. From the 2013–14 to 2015–16 seasons, the eight eliminated teams in this stage were dropped down to the 2nd-tier level EuroCup.

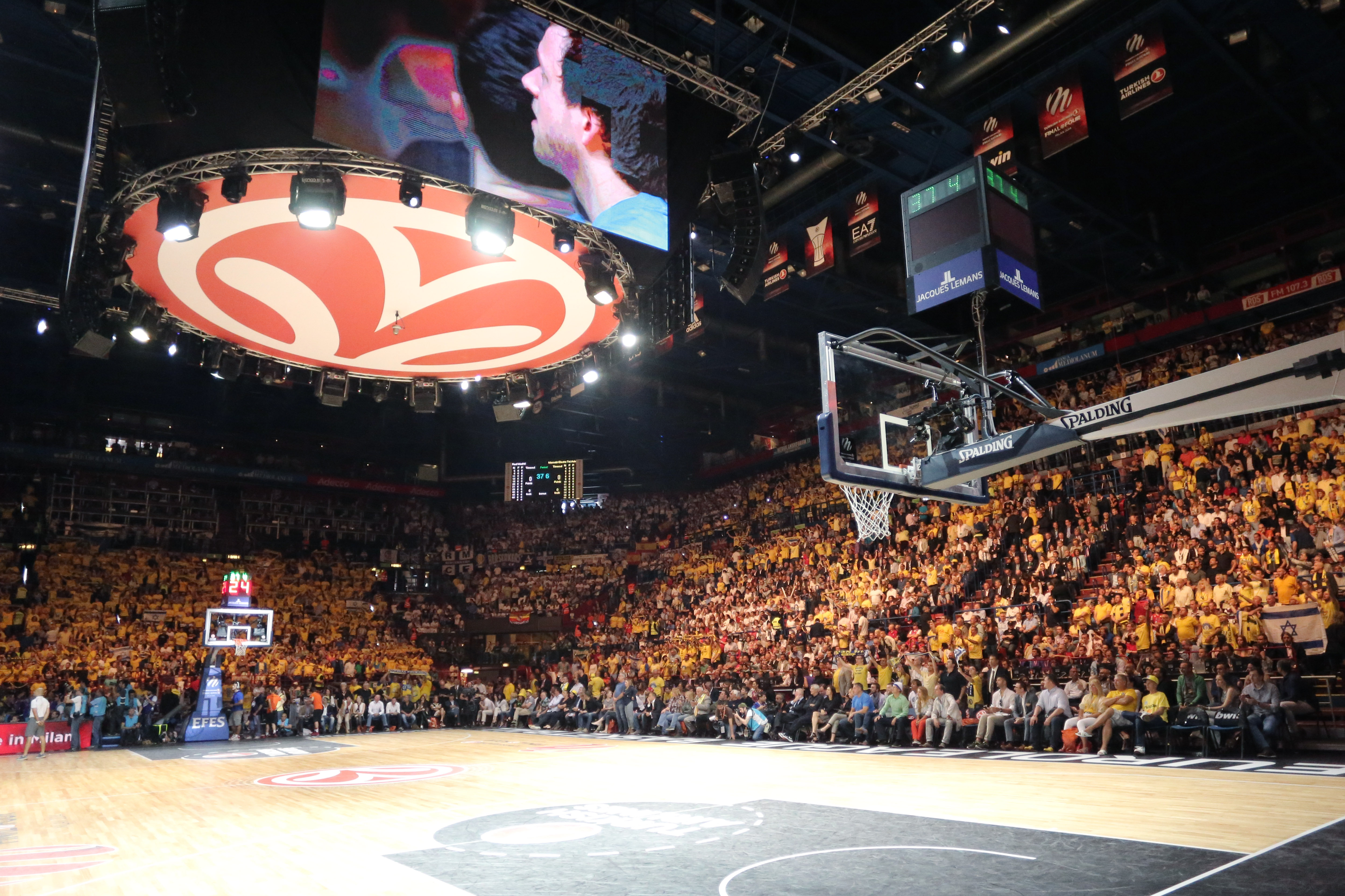
The setting of the 2014 EuroLeague Final Four, in Milan.

Under this format, the second phase, known as the Top 16, then began, featuring the 16 survivors of the Regular Season, drawn into eight-team groups. As in the Regular Season, each Top 16 group was contested in a double round-robin format.

The third phase under that format, the Quarterfinal round, was played from the 2004–05 season to the 2015–16 season. Before that, only the group winners advanced to the EuroLeague Final Four (see below). From the 2004–05 season to the 2015–16 season, the first- and second-place teams from each group advanced. In the quarterfinal round, the first-place team from each group was matched against a second-place team from another group, in a playoff series. Through the 2007–08 season, the playoff series were held in a best-of-three format, and expanded to a best-of-five format for the 2008–09 season. Home court advantage in the series went each one of the first-place teams from the previous stage.

Under these formats, the EuroLeague Final Four, held at a predetermined site, featured the winners of the four quarterfinal series in one-off knockout matches. The semifinal losers played for third place; and the winners played for the EuroLeague championship.

The 2010 EuroLeague Final Four was held on 7 and 9 May, at Palais Omnisports de Paris-Bercy in Paris, France. The 2011 EuroLeague Final Four was held at Palau Sant Jordi, in Barcelona, Catalonia, Spain.

For the 2012–13 Euroleague season, the Top 16 was changed from four groups of four teams, to two groups of eight teams. The four best teams in each group then qualified to the league's quarterfinals playoffs round.

=== Qualifications ===
Over the years, the EuroLeague usually, but not always, has included national domestic league champions from the leading European club basketball countries. Depending on the country, places in the EuroLeague may have been awarded the years on the basis of:

- Performance in their previous season's national domestic league.
- Performance over their previous two or three national domestic league seasons.
- Contracts with the Euroleague Basketball company.
- In addition, the winner of the previous season's 2nd-tier level EuroCup would always receive a place.

For example, two 2007–08 season national domestic league champions from ULEB member countries did not compete in the 2008–09 Euroleague — Zadar (Croatia) and Hapoel Holon (Israel). Zadar instead played in the European second-level EuroCup in the 2008–09 season. Hapoel Holon, however, did not compete in any of the three European-wide continental club competitions — not even in the then third-tier level EuroChallenge (which was run by FIBA Europe, instead of Euroleague Basketball) — because of financial difficulties.

Starting with the 2009–10 season, and through the 2015–16 season, the entrance criteria to the EuroLeague changed:

- A number of clubs were chosen via a formula based on competitive performance, television revenues, and home attendance, to receive "A Licenses", giving them automatic entry into the EuroLeague regular season phase. Originally, 13 clubs received A Licenses, with Asseco Prokom Gdynia of Poland becoming the 14th, before the 2011–12 season. A Licenses were awarded for three years, meaning that the next adjustment of A Licenses would not take place until the 2012–13 season. However, Euroleague Basketball suspended the A License of Virtus Roma, after the club finished in the bottom half of its national domestic league, in the 2010–11 season.
- Eight clubs received one-year "B Licenses" into the EuroLeague regular season. Seven of them were directly based on the ranking of the national domestic league in which the clubs competed. The eighth was a three-year "wild card" license, based on similar factors to the A Licenses; the first such license was awarded to ASVEL of France.
- Under this EuroLeague format, the winner of the previous season's EuroCup, received a one-year "C License" into the EuroLeague regular season. If the same club also qualified for a direct B License into the regular season, via its results in its national domestic league, the C License was then awarded to the club not already qualified for the EuroLeague regular season, that was highest on the EuroLeague entry list.
- Eight other clubs received one-year "B Licenses" into the EuroLeague qualifying rounds, with two advancing into the regular season.

=== EuroLeague teams that had an "A Licence" ===
- (Turkey) Anadolu Efes
- (France) ASVEL
- (Spain) Baskonia
- (Germany) Bayern Munich

- (Russia) CSKA Moscow
- (Spain) FC Barcelona
- (Turkey) Fenerbahçe
- (Israel) Maccabi Tel Aviv

- (Italy) Olimpia Milano
- (Greece) Olympiacos
- (Greece) Panathinaikos
- (Spain) Real Madrid
- (Lithuania) Žalgiris

==== EuroLeague teams that had and lost an "A Licence" ====
- (Italy) Virtus Roma
- (Poland) Asseco Prokom
- (Italy) Montepaschi Siena
- (Spain) Unicaja
