= Bertelè =

Bertelè is an Italian surname. Notable people with the surname include:

- Stefania Bertelè (born 1957), Italian ice dancer
- Tommaso Bertelè, Italian ambassador

== See also ==
- Bertele
- Berteling (disambiguation)
