= Berteling =

Berteling may refer to

- Ron Berteling (born 1957), Dutch ice hockey player
  - Ron Berteling Schaal, the opening game of the Dutch ice hockey league
- Berteling Building, a historic commercial building in Indiana, U.S.
