= Tautvydas Lydeka =

Lithuanian basketball player (born 1983)

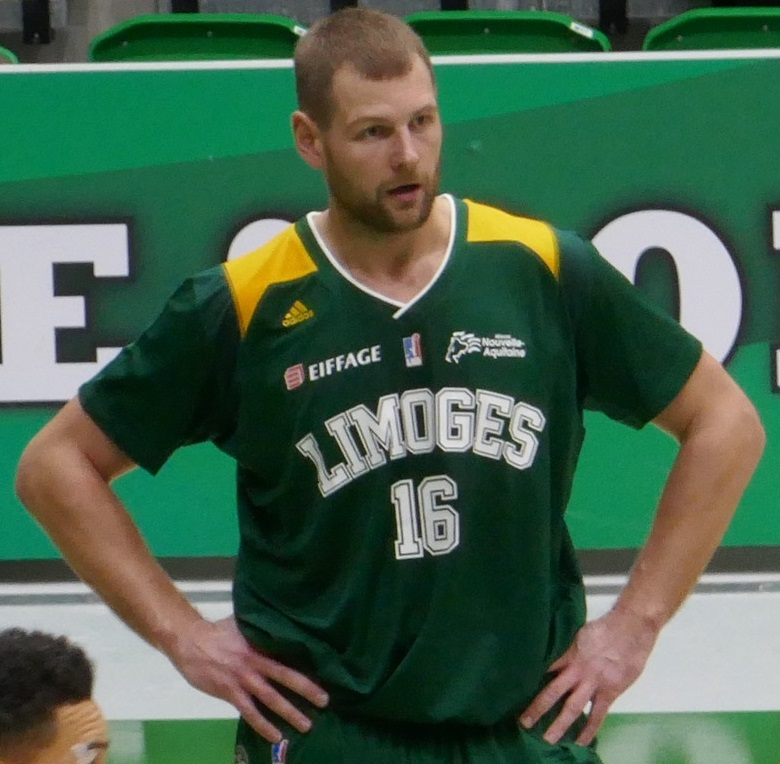
- Lydeka with Limoges CSP in 2017

Personal information
- Born: 13 October 1983 (age 43) Druskininkai, Lithuanian SSR, Soviet Union
- Listed height: 2.08 m (6 ft 10 in)
- Listed weight: 115 kg (254 lb)

Career information
- NBA draft: 2005: undrafted
- Playing career: 2003–2021
- Position: Center

Career history
- 2003–2004: LKKA Rusteda Kaunas
- 2005–2007: Dnipro Dnipropetrovsk
- 2007: Hanzevast Capitals Groningen
- 2007: Olympias Patras
- 2008: Igokea
- 2008–2010: Cantù
- 2010–2012: VL Pesaro
- 2012–2013: Krasnye Krylia
- 2013–2014: Lietuvos rytas
- 2014: Lietkabelis Panevežys
- 2014–2015: Trefl Sopot
- 2015: San Lorenzo
- 2015: VL Pesaro
- 2016–2017: Dinamo Sassari
- 2017–2018: Limoges CSP
- 2018: New Basket Brindisi
- 2018: Rasta Vechta
- 2019: VL Pesaro
- 2020: Dzūkija Alytus
- 2020: Caen
- 2020: Rytas Vilnius
- 2020-2021: US Avignon/Pontet Basket

Tautvydas Lydeka (born 13 October 1983) is a Lithuanian former professional basketball player.

== Professional career ==
Lydeka started his professional career, in LKKA Rusteda Kaunas (LKAL) 2003. Then he signed with Dnipro Dnipropetrovsk, where he played 2 seasons. In 2007–08 season he started in Hanzevast Capitals Groningen, but in October he moved to Olympias Patras. He played there until second half of the season when he moved to Igokea Partizan Aleksandrovac. In 2008 he moved to Italy where he play in Pallacanestro Cantù and Scavolini Pesaro. In 2012–13 season he played in Krasnye Krylia Samara. Eventually after 8 years aboard he debuted in LKL where he played in Lietuvos rytas Vilnius. In 2014–15 season he started in Lietkabelis Panevežys, but in October he moved to Trefl Sopot. In 2015–16 season he sign with San Lorenzo de Almagro Buenos Aires, becoming the first Lithuanian player in Argentina, but in December both parties agree to terminate contract, he signed with Consultinvest Pesaro where he played until end of the season. On 19 June 2016, he signed with Dinamo Sassari.

In February 2018, Lydeka returned to Italy, after his half-season with Limoges, and he signed with New Basket Brindisi.

On August 31, 2019, he has signed 2-month contract with VL Pesaro of the Lega Basket Serie A.

On March 10, 2020, he has signed with Caen Basket Calvados of the French Pro B.
