= Ricky Hickman =

American-Georgian basketball player

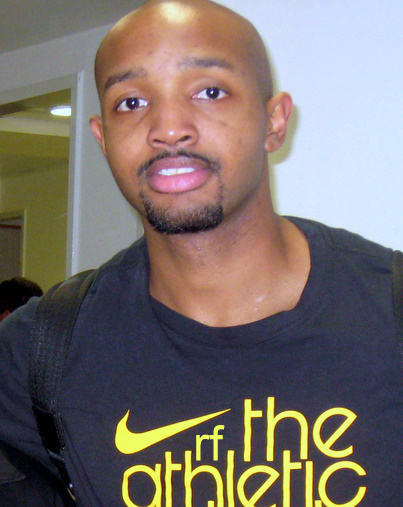
- Hickman, in 2012.

Personal information
- Born: September 1, 1985 (age 41) Winston-Salem, North Carolina
- Listed height: 1.89 m (6 ft 2 in)
- Listed weight: 88 kg (194 lb)

Career information
- High school: East Forsyth (Kernersville, North Carolina)
- College: UNC Greensboro (2003–2007)
- NBA draft: 2007: undrafted
- Playing career: 2007–2020
- Position: Shooting guard / point guard

Career history
- 2007–2008: CS Otopeni
- 2008–2009: Gießen 46ers
- 2009–2010: Namika Lahti
- 2010–2011: Fastweb Casale Monferrato
- 2011–2012: Scavolini Pesaro
- 2012–2014: Maccabi Tel Aviv
- 2014–2016: Fenerbahçe
- 2016–2017: Emporio Armani Milano
- 2017–2019: Brose Bamberg
- 2020: Pallacanestro Trieste

Career highlights
- EuroLeague champion (2014); All-EuroLeague Second Team (2014); Turkish League champion (2016); Turkish Cup winner (2016); German Cup winner (2019); Israeli Super League champion (2014); 2× Israeli State Cup winner (2013, 2014); Italian Cup winner (2017); Italian Cup MVP (2017); Italian Supercup winner (2016); Italian Second Division MVP (2011)

Richard Marciano Hickman, Jr. (born September 1, 1985) is an American-born naturalized Georgian former professional basketball player. He represented the Georgian national basketball team in international competitions. Standing at 6 ft 2.5 in (1.89 m), he played at the shooting guard and point guard positions. Hickman helped lead Maccabi Tel Aviv to a EuroLeague title in 2014, earning an All-EuroLeague Second Team selection in the process.

== High school ==
Hickman attended East Forsyth High School, where he played high school basketball, from 1999 to 2003.

== College career ==
After high school, Hickman attended UNC-Greensboro, where he played varsity school college basketball for four years. He played with the school's UNC Greensboro Spartans, from 2003 to 2007.

== Professional career ==
Hickman played with the professional basketball teams Otopeni in Romania, Gießen 46ers in Germany, and Namika Lahti in Finland, before joining the Italian 2nd Division team Junior Casale in 2010. In July 2011, he signed with Scavolini Pesaro for the 2011–12 season.

Hickman signed a two-year contract with the Israeli Super League team Maccabi Tel Aviv in 2012. In May 2014, he was named to the All-EuroLeague Second Team. Hickman helped Maccabi to win the EuroLeague title that season, along with teammates Tyrese Rice, Sofoklis Schortsanitis, and David Blu.

On July 1, 2014, he signed a two-year contract with the Turkish Super League club Fenerbahçe. On March 26, 2015, he suffered the Achilles tendon rupture injury in his right leg, which sidelined him off the court for the rest of season. Over 17 EuroLeague games, he averaged 9 points, 2.5 rebounds, and 2 assists per game, while also averaging 8 points and 2.6 assists over 15 Turkish League games. His team eventually advanced to the EuroLeague Final Four for the first time in team's history. On May 15, 2015, however, they lost in the semi-final game to Real Madrid, by a score of 87–96.

On July 26, 2016, Hickman signed a 1+1 deal with Italian League club EA7 Emporio Armani Milano. On July 14, 2017, Hickman signed a two-year contract with German League club Brose Bamberg.

Hickman began the 2019–20 season as a free agent. On 6 January 2020, he signed with the Italian club Pallacanestro Trieste, for the second half remainder of the season.

== National team career ==
Hickman represented the senior Georgian national team in national team competitions. With Georgia, he played at the 2013 EuroBasket, where he averaged 11.8 points, 4.4 rebounds, and 1.6 assists per game, over 5 group stage games.

== Career statistics ==
Legend
| GP | Games played | GS | Games started | MPG | Minutes per game |
| FG% | Field-goal percentage | 3P% | 3-point field-goal percentage | FT% | Free-throw percentage |
| RPG | Rebounds per game | APG | Assists per game | SPG | Steals per game |
| BPG | Blocks per game | PPG | Points per game | PIR | Performance index rating |
| **Bold** | Career high |

=== EuroLeague ===
| † | Denotes seasons in which Hickman won the EuroLeague |

| Year | Team | GP | GS | MPG | FG% | 3P% | FT% | RPG | APG | SPG | BPG | PPG | PIR |
|---|---|---|---|---|---|---|---|---|---|---|---|---|---|
| 2012–13 | Maccabi | 27 | **27** | **28.9** | **.448** | **.356** | .784 | **2.7** | 3.1 | **1.4** | **.2** | **13.5** | **14.9** |
| 2013–14† | Maccabi | **30** | 26 | 28.7 | .440 | .326 | .752 | 2.6 | 2.7 | .8 | .1 | 12.2 | 11.2 |
| 2014–15 | Fenerbahçe | 17 | 4 | 22.1 | .333 | .328 | .800 | 2.5 | 2.0 | 1.1 | .1 | 9.0 | 7.7 |
| 2015–16 | Fenerbahçe | 20 | 3 | 11.8 | .423 | .310 | .793 | 1.3 | 1.3 | .4 | .0 | 4.6 | 4.7 |
| 2016–17 | Milano | **30** | 20 | 24.9 | .419 | .349 | .802 | 2.6 | **3.3** | .8 | .1 | 10.1 | 10.4 |
| 2017–18 | Bamberg | 28 | 21 | 23.9 | .385 | .326 | **.818** | 2.3 | 2.2 | 1.1 | .1 | 11.7 | 9.7 |
| Career | | 152 | 101 | 24.1 | .408 | .336 | .778 | 2.4 | 2.6 | 1.0 | .1 | 10.6 | 10.2 |
