= Diego Monaldi =

Italian basketball player

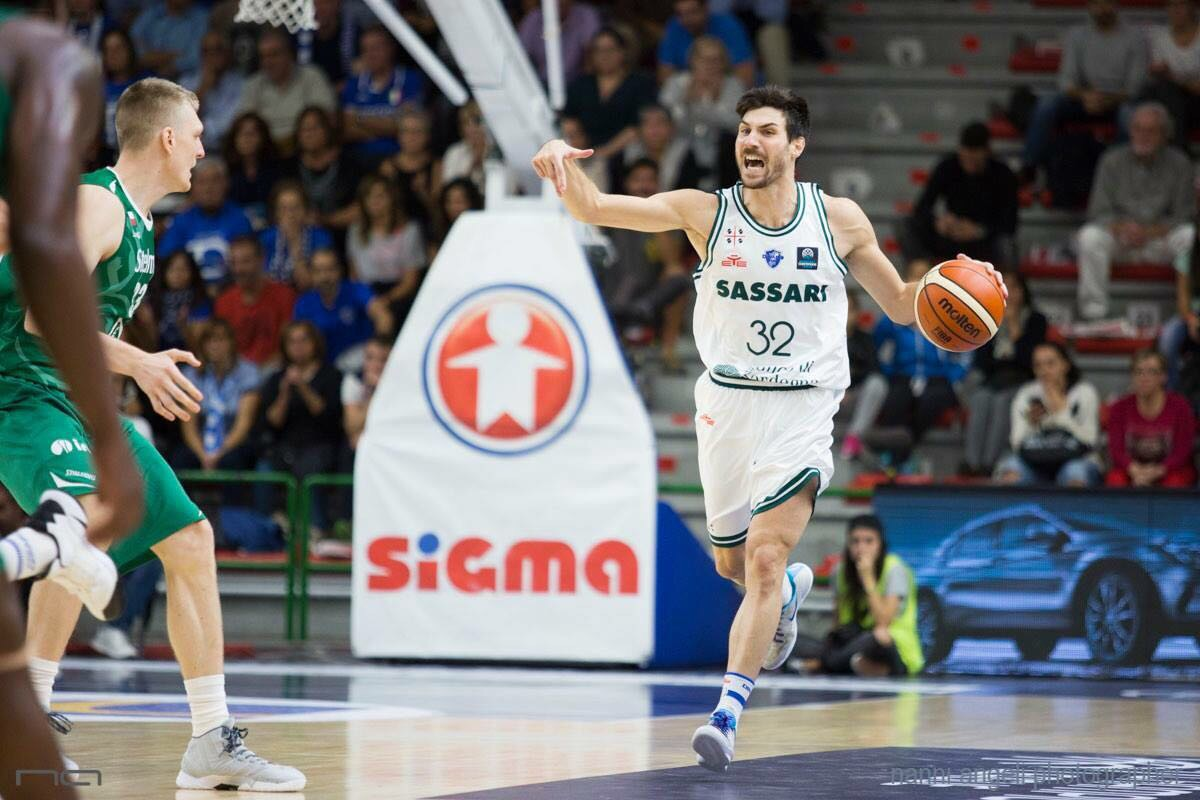

No. 32 – Dinamo Sassari
- Position: Point guard
- League: LBA

Personal information
- Born: April 3, 1993 (age 33) Aprilia, Italy
- Listed height: 185 cm (6 ft 1 in)
- Listed weight: 75 kg (165 lb)

Career information
- Playing career: 2010–present

Career history
- 2010–2011: Mens Sana Siena
- 2011–2012: → Pallacanestro Firenze
- 2012–2013: →Junior Casale Monferrato
- 2013: →CUS Bari
- 2013–2014: →Viola Reggio Calabria
- 2014–2016: Pallacanestro Chieti
- 2016–2017: Dinamo Sassari
- 2017–2019: Pesaro Pallacanestro
- 2019–2021: Napoli
- 2021–2024: Scafati Basket
- 2024–2026: Scaligera Verona
- 2026–present: Dinamo Sassari

Diego Monaldi (born April 3, 1993) is an Italian professional basketball player for Dinamo Sassari of the Italian Lega Basket Serie A (LBA). Standing at 1.85 metres (6 feet 1 inch), he plays the point guard position.

== Career ==
=== Youth teams ===
Diego took his first steps into basketball with the local Virtus Aprilia Team. He was discovered by Coach Massimiliano Briscese who brought him to Virtus Roma where he spent two years (2005–2007).
In his first year with Virtus Roma he took part to the U14 Italian national finals in Bormio (with players born on 1992, older than him by one year), playing in the group “A” against Armani Jeans Milano, Pol Virtus Monte di Procida, O.F.P. Azzurra Trieste R.D.R. Trieste but failing to reach the second round.
In 2006-2007 He led the U14 Virtus Roma Team to win the prestigious “Trofeo Zanatta” scoring 37 points in the final game and averaging 27.4 points per game. In the same year he took part to the U16 National finals, and was rewarded as the best young player of the tournament. The same year he took part to the U14 national finals where was elected both MVP and selected in the all tournament first team.
In 2007-2008 Diego joined the youth team of Monte dei Paschi Siena, taking part to the U15 national finals averaging 30,17 points per game, and eventually being rewarded with the MVP award of the tournament, receiving the award from Carlo Recalcati, head coach of the senior Italian men national team.
On September 25, 2009, Diego made his first appearance with the Monte dei Paschi senior team, led by coach Simone Pianigiani, in an exhibition game vs the Efes Pilsen Istanbul. Throughout his stay in Siena he appeared in 4 games with the senior team in the Italian first division. In the same year took part to U19 National finals held in Bologna (playing against players older than him by 2 years), where he scored 17 points in the final game vs the Virtus Bologna which eventually won the title. A few weeks later Diego will win his second national championship: the U17 national title being also selected in the all tournament first team.

=== Senior teams ===
In 2011-2012 moved to Firenze (DNA League). Still being a player of Monte dei Paschi Siena, over the course of the same season, due to some injuries, he has been part of the Monte dei Paschi Siena’ s roster for the Euroleague game vs Galatasaray in Turkey.
In 2012-2013 moved to Junior Casale (Legadue)
In 2013-2014 signed for Cus Bari Pallacanestro (Serie B), and over the course of the same year moved to Reggio Calabria (Legadue)
In 2014-2015 signed with Chieti (Legadue), and at the end of the season is elected best young player of the A2 league.
In 2015-2016 remained in Chieti, and that was one of the best seasons of his career with 32.2 MPG, 12.5 PPG, 3.1 APG and 2.9 RPG. He scored 30 points in the most important game of the season which allowed Chieti to remain in the Italian second division 3 games before the end of the season.
In 2016-2017 Monaldi signed a 3-year deal with Dinamo Sassari, one of the elite teams of the Italian first league, where he also had the chance to compete in the European Champions League. Despite the 3-year contract, and the skills showed at this level too (despite the few minutes played), at the end of the season Diego decided to part with Sassari. On June 25, 2017, he signed with V.L. Pesaro.
During the two season at Pesaro Diego has played 18,2 and 18,3 minutes per game providing his leadership and playmaking skills to the team and helping the VL to remain in the Italian first league.
On July 9 Signs a one-year deal with Gevi Napoli (Italian second League), where he will be the starting PG for the ’19 – ’20 season

After 2 season in Napoli, where he won the League cup and the playoff finals to access to serie A (the first Italian league), in June 2021 he signed for Basket Scafati 1969

=== National team ===
In 2007-2008 Diego made his debut with the Italian U16 national team taking part in the popular “Torneo dell’amicizia” held in Spain. In the first game vs Spain in Guadalajara he scored 13 PTS.
In 2008-2009 took part in the U16 European Championship held in Kaunas, Lithuania. He was both the best player and scorer (17 ppg) for his team.
In 2009-2010 took part in the U18 European Championship held in Vilnius, Lithuania (selected to play with a team made of athletes older than him)
In 2010-2011 was a member of the U18 Italian National team, taking part to the U18 European Championship held in Wroclaw, Poland, where Italy finished 4th.
In 2011-2012 took part with the U18 3X3 national team in the first 3X3 world championship, held in Rimini, Italy, finished 3rd winning the bronze medal.
In 2012-2013 Diego is selected to play for the U20 Italian National team for taking part in the European U20 Championship in Tallinn, Estonia, where he won the gold medal
In 2014-2015 is selected to join the “Experimental Italian Senior National Team” (the second Italian senior national team, aimed to support the first team by developing the players to possibly join the first team in future), for a series of games in China vs Russia, Ireland and China.
