= Bertele =

Bertele is a German surname. Notable people with the surname include:

- Ludwig Bertele (1900–1985), German optics constructor
- Michael von Bertele (born 1956), British Army officer
