= 2014 Euroleague Final Four =

Basketball tournament

- The official logo was revealed in February 2014.
- Season: 2013–14 Euroleague

Tournament details
- Arena: Mediolanum Forum; Milan, Italy
- Dates: 16 May 2014 – 18 May 2014

Final positions
- Champions: (Israel) Maccabi Electra Tel Aviv (6th title)
- Runners-up: (Spain) Real Madrid
- Third place: (Spain) FC Barcelona
- Fourth place: (Russia) CSKA Moscow

Awards and statistics
- MVP: (Montenegro) Tyrese Rice
- Top scorer(s): (Spain) Sergio Rodríguez, 42

The 2014 Euroleague Final Four was the concluding EuroLeague Final Four tournament of the 2013–14 Euroleague basketball season. It was held from 16 to 18 May 2014. All of the games were played at the Mediolanum Forum, in Milan. Maccabi Electra Tel Aviv upset CSKA Moscow, 68–67, in the first semifinal, while Real Madrid dominated FC Barcelona, 100–62, in the second semifinal. In the final, Maccabi upset highly favored Real, by a score of 98–86, in the tournament's first overtime final since 1969. The win gave Maccabi their sixth EuroLeague title.

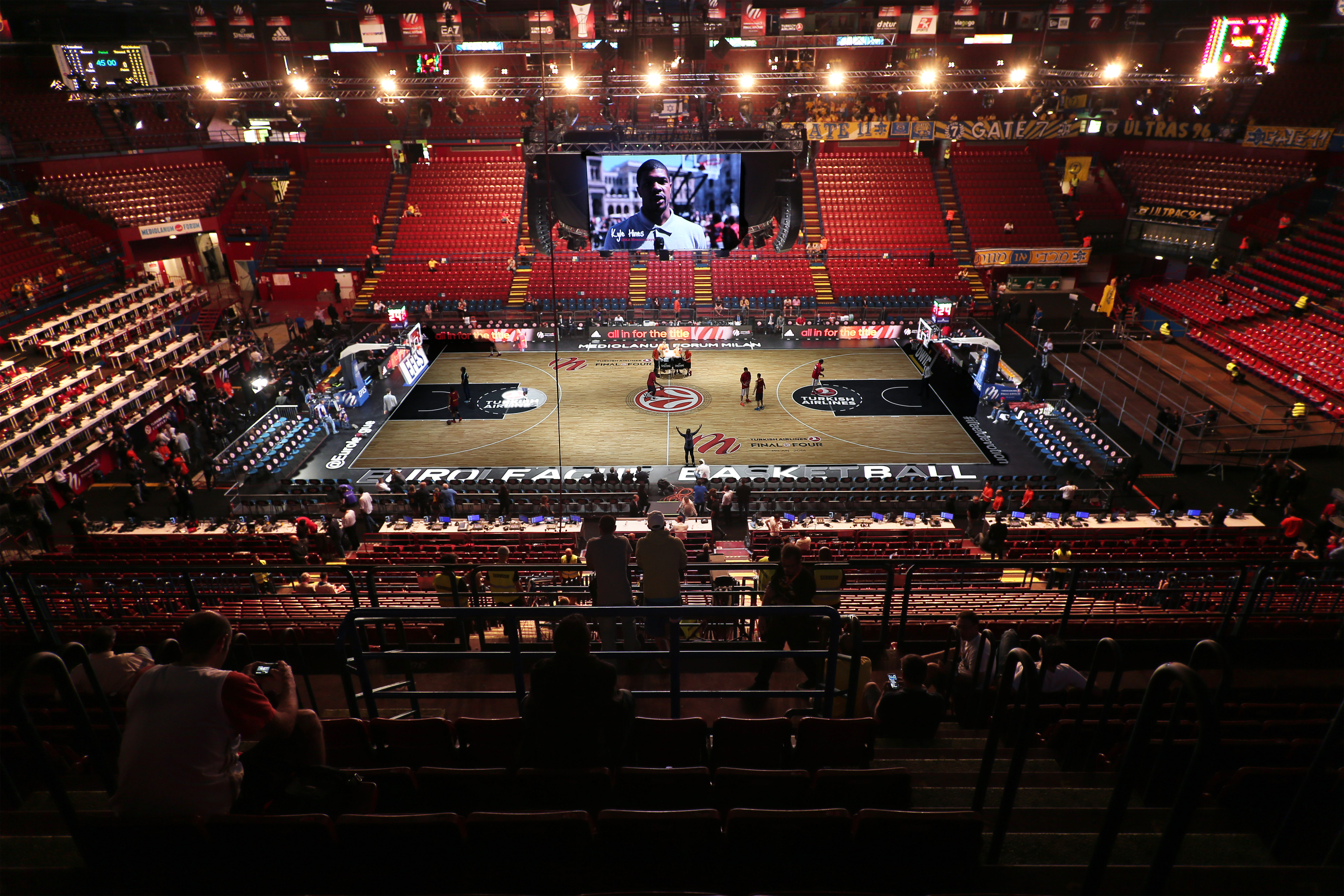
The Mediolanum Forum set up for the EuroLeague Final Four

== Bracket ==
Semifinals; 16 May
(Russia) CSKA Moscow	67
(Israel) Maccabi Electra Tel Aviv	68
(Spain) FC Barcelona	62
(Spain) Real Madrid	100

Championship game 18 May
(Israel) Maccabi Electra Tel Aviv	98
(Spain) Real Madrid	86
Third place game
(Russia) CSKA Moscow	78
(Spain) FC Barcelona	93

== Semifinals ==
All times are CEST (UTC+2).

=== CSKA Moscow vs. Maccabi Electra Tel Aviv ===
CSKA Moscow entered their semi-final match up against Maccabi Electra Tel Aviv, having won both regular season meetings. It looked like Moscow would make it 3–0 on the year, when they took a 55–40 lead, late in the third quarter. However, led by guard Tyrese Rice, and support from a large majority of the fans in attendance, Maccabi launch a fourth quarter comeback. Rice's steal and layup, with 5 seconds to play, gave Maccabi a 68–67 lead, and Sonny Weems missed a contested three pointer at the buzzer. Maccabi's David Blu led all scorers with 15 points.

16 May 2014	CSKA Moscow (Russia)	67–68	(Israel) Maccabi Electra Tel Aviv	Mediolanum Forum, Milan
18:00	Scoring by quarter: 19–16, 19–14, 17–15, 12–23
	Pts: Kaun 14; Rebs: Khryapa 10; Asts: Weems 6	Report	Pts: Blu 15; Rebs: Smith 9 Asts: Ohayon 4	Attendance: 11,843; Referees: Sasa Pukl (SLO), Milivoje Jovčić (SRB), Borys Ryzhyk (UKR)

=== FC Barcelona vs. Real Madrid ===
Real Madrid entered the Final Four as the clear favorite, having recorded the highest point differential in both group (plus 237) and Final 16 play (plus 143). Between the two stages, they held a 24–4 overall record.

After FC Barcelona got off to a 12–4 start, the semifinal game was all Real Madrid. Real scored 14 3-pointers, and played at a blistering pace, to beat their Spanish rivals for the fifth time in six games on the year. Real's Sergio Rodríguez led all-scorers with 21 points, followed by teammate Nikola Mirotić, who scored 19. Three other Real players scored more than 10 points.

16 May 2014	FC Barcelona (Spain)	62–100	(Spain) Real Madrid	Mediolanum Forum, Milan
21:00 CET	Scoring by quarter: 20–20, 17–25, 11–28, 14–27
	Pts: Tomić 16; Rebs: Tomić 8 Asts: Huertas 6	Report	Pts: Rodríguez 21; Rebs: Llull, Slaughter 5 Asts: Rodríguez 6	Attendance: 11,843; Referees: Christos Christodoulou (GRE), Ilija Belošević (SRB), Robert Lottermoser (GER)

== Third-place game ==
Juan Carlos Navarro of FC Barcelona, became the EuroLeague's all-time leader in three-point field goals made, after hitting three three-point field goals during the game.

18 May 2014	FC Barcelona (Spain)	93–78	(Russia) CSKA Moscow	Mediolanum Forum, Milan
17:00 (CET)	Scoring by quarter: 21–24, 29–23, 19–17, 24–14
	Pts: Navarro 20; Rebs: Dorsey 12; Asts: Huertas 7	Report	Pts: Kaun 12; Rebs: Khryapa 4 Asts: Khryapa 7	Attendance: 11,843 (Tentative); Referees: Robert Lottermoser (GER), Fernando Rocha (POR), Rüştü Nuran (TUR)

== Championship game ==
Before the game, Real Madrid was heavily favored, as they sought a league-record ninth title. Real got off to a good start, taking an 11-point lead in the first half, behind a 19–2 run. However, Maccabi Tel Aviv fought back with a series of fast breaks, and trailed by just two points, at half time.

It looked as if Maccabi would come out on top, after a back-and-forth second half, that gave them a four-point lead, with under a minute to play. However, Real hit four consecutive free throws, from Sergio Rodríguez and Ioannis Bourousis, to tie the game. Tyrese Rice missed a three pointer at the buzzer, that would have given Maccabi the win. Instead, the final went to overtime, for the first time since 1969. Rice dominated in overtime, scoring 14, as Maccabi pulled away, for a 98–86 win. In total, Rice scored 21 of his 26 points in the fourth quarter and overtime. Rodriguez led Real with 21 points.

The win gave Maccabi their sixth league title. For Real Madrid, it was the second consecutive year in which they lost in the final game.

18 May 2014	Real Madrid (Spain)	86–98(OT)	(Israel) Maccabi Electra Tel Aviv	Mediolanum Forum, Milan
20:00 (CET)	Scoring by quarter: 16–15, 19–18, 20–20, 18–20, Overtime: 13–25
	Pts: Rodríguez 21; Rebs: Bourousis 9 Asts: Llull 8	Report	Pts: Rice 26; Rebs: Tyus 11; Asts: Hickman 8	Attendance: 11,843; Referees: Christos Christodoulou (GRE), Sasa Pukl (SLO), Milivoje Jovčić (SRB)

Real Madrid	Maccabi

Starters:			Pts	Reb	Ast
PG	23	(Spain) Sergio Llull	0	2	8
SG	5	(Spain) Rudy Fernández	15	8	4
SF	21	(United States) Tremmell Darden	7	7	0
PF	11	(Spain) Nikola Mirotić	12	7	1
C	30	(Greece) Ioannis Bourousis	12	9	0
Reserves:					
F	9	(Spain) Felipe Reyes	12	6	0
F	11	(Spain) Dani Díez	0	0	0
G	13	(Spain) Sergio Rodríguez	21	2	2
G	20	(Azerbaijan) Jaycee Carroll	5	1	0
F	44	(United States) Marcus Slaughter	2	0	0
C	50	(Tunisia) Salah Mejri	0	1	0
Head coach:
(Spanish Basketball Federation) Pablo Laso

Rules

The games was played under official FIBA rules.

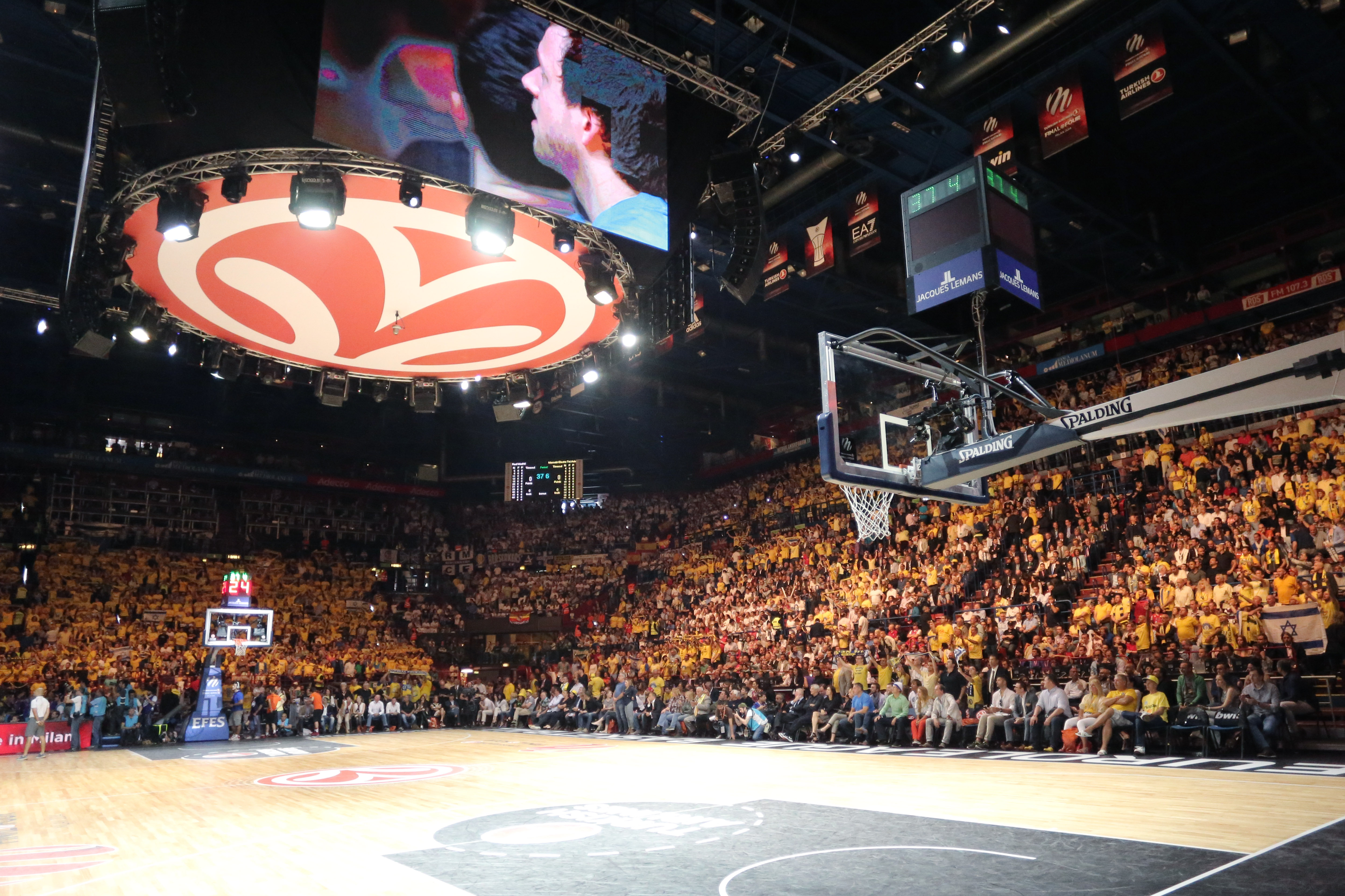
Mediolanum Forum

2013–14 Euroleague
Champions

Maccabi Electra Tel Aviv
6th Title

Starters:			Pts	Reb	Ast
PG	12	(Israel) Yogev Ohayon	4	5	1
SG	7	(Georgia (country)) Ricky Hickman	18	6	3
SF	6	(United States) Devin Smith	15	7	0
PF	10	(Israel) Guy Pnini	0	2	2
C	21	(Greece) Sofoklis Schortsanitis	9	3	1
Reserves:					
G	4	(Montenegro) Tyrese Rice	26	4	2
G	8	(Australia) Joe Ingles	0	1	0
C	9	(Israel) Alex Tyus	12	11	0
F	13	(Israel) David Blu	14	4	1
C	14	(Israel) Ben Altit	DNP		
F	15	(Israel) Sylven Landesberg	DNP		
C	11	(Croatia) Andrija Žižić	DNP		
Head coach:
(Israeli Basketball Association) David Blatt

- Team captains (C): (Spain) Felipe Reyes (Real Madrid and (Israel) Guy Pnini (Maccabi Tel Aviv)

== Reaction ==
Maccabi's surprise win led to wild celebrations, as the club's fans filled Tel Aviv's Rabin Square. Israeli President Shimon Peres, called to congratulate the team, saying "I watched the whole game, and nearly had a heart attack. You are heroes, and have brought incredible pride to the state of Israel." Prime Minister Benjamin Netanyahu, also offered his personal congratulations.

Spanish fans expressed their frustration on Twitter. An estimated 18,000 such tweets contained antisemitic language, prompting a lawsuit by local Jewish communities, and an official apology by the league.
