= Lorenzo D'Ercole =

Italian basketball player (born 1988)

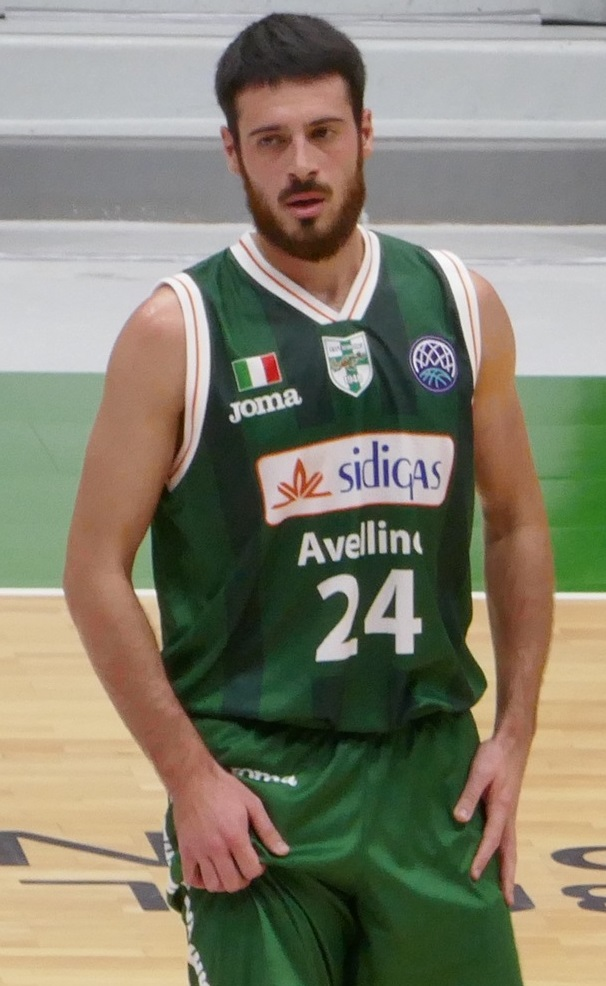
- D'Ercole with Felice Scandone in October 2017

Free agent
- Position: Point guard

Personal information
- Born: 11 February 1988 (age 38) Pistoia, Italy
- Listed height: 1.88 m (6 ft 2 in)
- Listed weight: 80 kg (176 lb)

Career information
- NBA draft: 2010: undrafted
- Playing career: 2004–present

Career history
- 2004–2005: RB Montecatini
- 2005–2010: Montepaschi Siena
- 2007–2008: →Livorno
- 2008–2009: →Udine
- 2010–2012: Vanoli Cremona
- 2012–2015: Virtus Roma
- 2015–2017: Dinamo Sassari
- 2017–2019: Scandone Avellino
- 2019–2020: Pistoia
- 2020–2021: Reyer Venezia
- 2021: Derthona Basket

Career highlights
- 2× Serie A champion (2007, 2010); Italian Cup winner (2010); Italian Supercup winner (2009); 2× Serie A All-Star (2011, 2012)
Medals
Men's basketball
Representing Italy
FIBA Europe Under-20 Championship
Bronze medal – third place	2007 Italy

Lorenzo D'Ercole (born 11 February 1988) is an Italian professional basketball player, who last played for Derthona Basket of the Italian Serie A2 Basket, second tier national championship. Standing at 1.93 m (6 ft 4 in), he plays at the point guard position.

== Professional career ==
On 1 June 2020, D'Ercole signed a one-year contract with Reyer Venezia. At mid-season, on February 17, 2021, he moved to Derthona Basket in the Italian Serie A2 Basket, second tier national championship.

== International career ==
The Italian started in the under age categories of Italy, first for the Under 16's at the 2004 European Championship and then notably winning the bronze medal with the U20's at the 2007 European Championship. He made his debut with the senior men's national team during the 2009 Mediterranean Games, in which Italy was ranked fourth after losing the bronze medal game.

== Career statistics ==
Legend
GP	Games played	GS	Games started	MPG	Minutes per game
FG%	Field-goal percentage	3P%	3-point field-goal percentage	FT%	Free-throw percentage
RPG	Rebounds per game	APG	Assists per game	SPG	Steals per game
BPG	Blocks per game	PPG	Points per game	PIR	Performance index rating
**Bold**	Career high

=== EuroLeague ===
Year	Team	GP	GS	MPG	FG%	3P%	FT%	RPG	APG	SPG	BPG	PPG	PIR
2009–10	Siena	3	0	5.5	.0	.500	.0	.0	.0	.0	.0	2.0	1.0
2015–16	Sassari	8	0	9.5	.333	.111	.0	.6	.3	.3	.0	.6	.3
Career		11	0	8.6	.333	.231	.0	.2	.2	.6	.0	1.0	.454

== Awards and honors ==
=== Team ===
- Serie A champion: 2007, 2010
- Italian Cup winner: 2010
- **Italian Supercup** winner: 2009

==== International ====
- **European Under-20 Championship**
  - 2007 Italy Bronze

=== Individual ===
- 2× Serie A All-Star: 2011, 2012
