= Federico Pasquini =

Italian basketball coach and general manager

Dinamo Basket Sassari
- Position: General manager
- League: Lega Basket Serie A Champions League

Personal information
- Born: 1973 (age 52–53) Ferrara, Italy

Career history

Coaching
- 2000–2001: Progresso Castelmaggiore (assistant)
- 2002–2003: Orlandina Basket (assistant)
- 2003–2004: Orlandina Basket
- 2004–2005: Basket Club Ferrara (assistant)
- 2006–2007: Basket Castelfiorentino
- 2007–2009: Fortitudo Bologna (assistant)
- 2009: Basket Rieti (assistant)
- 2009–2010: Basket Rieti
- 2011: Robur Sassari
- 2016–2018: Dinamo Sassari

Federico Pasquini (born in 1973 in Ferrara, Italy) is an Italian professional basketball coach and general manager.

His first time as a head coach was with Orlandina Basket in 2003.

From 2016 to 2018 he was the head coach of the Italian basketball team Banco di Sardegna Sassari of Lega Basket Serie A (LBA). He is still general manager of the club.

== Career ==
Federico Pasquini began his career as an assistant coach in Castelmaggiore. Next two seasons he went to Orlandina Basket, where he made his debut as head coach in 2003. He later returned to his assistant coach place with Basket Club Ferrara, his birthplace.

He became assistant of coach Dragan Sakota of Fortitudo Bologna, and later assistant of Cesare Pancotto.

In 2009 he is in Naples, but he accepted to become coach of Robur Sassari in Serie B Basket.

In 2012, Stefano Sardara, president of Dinamo Sassari, appointed Federico Pasquini as general manager of the club.

On 7 March 2016 he became head coach of Dinamo Sassari in LBA as soon as Marco Calvani was sacked. Pasquini continued to be head coach also for the next season and he had a contract extension until 2018. Up to now he is both head coach and general manager of the club.
