= 2012–13 Euroleague Regular Season Group A =

Standings and Results for Group A of the regular season phase of the 2012–13 Euroleague basketball tournament.

== Standings ==
| Pos | Team | Pld | W | L | PF | PA | PD | Qualification |
|---|---|---|---|---|---|---|---|---|
| 1 | (Spain) Real Madrid | 10 | 7 | 3 | 832 | 738 | +94 | Advance to Top 16 |
| 2 | (Russia) Khimki | 10 | 6 | 4 | 753 | 754 | −1 | Advance to Top 16 |
| 3 | (Greece) Panathinaikos | 10 | 6 | 4 | 748 | 722 | +26 | Advance to Top 16 |
| 4 | (Turkey) Fenerbahçe Ülker | 10 | 5 | 5 | 727 | 738 | −11 | Advance to Top 16 |
| 5 | (Slovenia) Union Olimpija | 10 | 3 | 7 | 722 | 808 | −86 | |
| 6 | (Italy) Mapooro Cantù | 10 | 3 | 7 | 708 | 730 | −22 | |

Source: Euroleague

== Fixtures and results ==
All times given below are in Central European Time.

=== Game 1 ===
11 October 2012
20:45

Report

| Fenerbahçe Ülker (Turkey) | 92–80 | (Russia) Khimki |
Scoring by quarter: 25–25, 21–11, 16–18, 30–26
| Pts: Preldžić 20; Rebs: Batiste 5 Asts: McCalebb 4 | | Pts: Planinić 17; Rebs: Planinić 6 Asts: Planinić 8 |

Ülker Sports Arena, Istanbul
Attendance: 8,400
Referees: Ilyja Belosevic (SRB), Dani Hierrezuelo (ESP), Panagiotis Anastopoulos (GRE)

11 October 2012
20:45

Report

| Mapooro Cantù (Italy) | 71–84 | (Slovenia) Union Olimpija |
Scoring by quarter: 17–20, 23–21, 13–18, 18–25
| Pts: Aradori 16; Rebs: Aradori 8 Asts: four players 2 | | Pts: Page 17; Rebs: Baynes 12; Asts: Waters 6 |

Palasport di Desio, Desio
Attendance: 3,631
Referees: Milivoje Jovcic (SRB), Tomas Jasevicius, (LTU), Anastasios Piloidis (GRE)

12 October 2012
21:30

Report

| Real Madrid (Spain) | 85–78 | (Greece) Panathinaikos |
Scoring by quarter: 22–20, 13–24, 24–16, 26–18
| Pts: Fernández 23; Rebs: Mirotić 8 Asts: Llull 4 | | Pts: Schortsanitis 23; Rebs: Tsartsaris 6 Asts: Diamantidis 6 |

Palacio de Deportes, Madrid
Attendance: 10,930
Referees: Sasa Pukl (SLO), Tolga Sahin (ITA), Olegs Latisevs (LAT)

=== Game 2 ===
18 October 2012
21:00

Report

| Panathinaikos (Greece) | 78–76 | (Italy) Mapooro Cantù |
Scoring by quarter: 23–17, 21–26, 17–12, 17–21
| Pts: Schortsanitis 19; Rebs: Tsartsaris 6 Asts: Diamantidis 7 | | Pts: Markoishvili, Aradori 17; Rebs: Tyus 6 Asts: Tabu, Markoishvili 3 |

O.A.C.A., Athens
Attendance: 7,000
Referees: Vicente Bulto (ESP), Sinisa Herceg (CRO), Seffi Shemmesh (ISR)

19 October 2012
17:30

Report

| Khimki (Russia) | 86–85 | (Spain) Real Madrid |
Scoring by quarter: 28–18, 17–17, 27–20, 17–30
| Pts: Lončar 16; Rebs: Augustine, Fridzon 7 Asts: Planinić 7 | | Pts: Fernández, Reyes 15; Rebs: Slaughter 9 Asts: Fernández 6 |

Basketball Center, Khimki
Attendance: 5,000
Referees: Grzegorz Ziemblicki (POL), Paolo Taurino (ITA), Elias Koromilas (GRE)

19 October 2012
20:45

Report

| Union Olimpija (Slovenia) | 75–81 | (Turkey) Fenerbahçe Ülker |
Scoring by quarter: 20–25, 26–18, 15–20, 14–18
| Pts: Prepelič 13; Rebs: Baynes 12; Asts: Blažič 3 | | Pts: McCalebb 17; Rebs: Preldžić 6 Asts: McCalebb 5 |

Arena Stožice, Ljubljana
Attendance: 8,200
Referees: Jose Ramon Garcia Ortiz (ESP), Roberto Chiari (ITA), Marcin Kowalski (POL)

=== Game 3 ===
25 October 2012
19:00

Report

| Fenerbahçe Ülker (Turkey) | 75–83 | (Spain) Real Madrid |
Scoring by quarter: 13–21, 23–21, 21–24, 18–17
| Pts: Onan 14; Rebs: McCalebb 4 Asts: Preldžić 6 | | Pts: Fernández 21; Rebs: Mirotić, Begić 6 Asts: Rodríguez 6 |

Ülker Sports Arena, Istanbul
Attendance: 12,100
Referees: Christos Christodoulou (GRE), Borys Ryzhyk (UKR), Damir Javor (SLO)

26 October 2012
20:15

Report

| Mapooro Cantù (Italy) | 67–54 | (Russia) Khimki |
Scoring by quarter: 14–21, 21–11, 20–11, 12–11
| Pts: Aradori 13; Rebs: Aradori 8 Asts: Markoishvili, Tabu 4 | | Pts: Fridzon, Planinić 10; Rebs: Augustine 6 Asts: Planinić 7 |

Palasport di Desio, Desio
Attendance: 3,779
Referees: Jose Ramon Garcia Ortiz (ESP), Sreten Radovic (CRO), Zdravko Rutesic (MNE)

26 October 2012
20:30

Report

| Union Olimpija (Slovenia) | 67–85 | (Greece) Panathinaikos |
Scoring by quarter: 19–23, 19–27, 12–19, 17–16
| Pts: Baynes 16; Rebs: Baynes 6 Asts: Waters 7 | | Pts: Mačiulis 18; Rebs: Lasme 8 Asts: Diamantidis 6 |

Arena Stožice, Ljubljana
Attendance: 7,900
Referees: Guerrino Cerebuch (ITA), Juan Carlos Garcia Gonzalez (ESP), Boris Shulga (UKR)

=== Game 4 ===
1 November 2012
20:00

Report

| Fenerbahçe Ülker (Turkey) | 73–64 | (Greece) Panathinaikos |
Scoring by quarter: 19–17, 23–12, 16–12, 15–23
| Pts: McCalebb, Bogdanović 13; Rebs: Karaman 7 Asts: Bremer 3 | | Pts: Mačiulis 14; Rebs: Mačiulis 10; Asts: Schortsanitis 4 |

Ülker Sports Arena, Istanbul
Attendance: 11,100
Referees: Carl Jungebrand (FIN), Robert Lottermoser (GER), Matej Boltauzer (SLO)

1 November 2012
20:45

Report

| Real Madrid (Spain) | 80–66 | (Italy) Mapooro Cantù |
Scoring by quarter: 18–12, 23–14, 22–22, 17–18
| Pts: Begić 17; Rebs: Begić 10; Asts: Suárez 5 | | Pts: Aradori 18; Rebs: Brooks 7 Asts: Smith 3 |

Palacio de Deportes, Madrid
Attendance: 9,235
Referees: Fernando Rocha (POR), Eddie Viator (FRA), Panagiotis Anastopoulos (GRE)

2 November 2012
19:30

Report

| Khimki (Russia) | 75–65 | (Slovenia) Union Olimpija |
Scoring by quarter: 18–19, 25–14, 13–15, 19–17
| Pts: Fridzon 20; Rebs: Lončar 7 Asts: Planinić 6 | | Pts: Baynes 27; Rebs: Baynes 10; Asts: Waters 7 |

Basketball Center, Khimki
Attendance: 4,050
Referees: Marek Cmikiewicz (POL), Sergiy Chebyshev (UKR), Apostolos Kalpakas (SWE)

=== Game 5 ===
8 November 2012
20:45

Report

| Mapooro Cantù (Italy) | 82–58 | (Turkey) Fenerbahçe Ülker |
Scoring by quarter: 23–12, 18–15, 16–14, 25–17
| Pts: Tabu 16; Rebs: Leunen 7 Asts: Tabu 7 | | Pts: Sato 10; Rebs: Three Players 3 Asts: Three Players 3 |

Palasport di Desio, Desio
Attendance: 4,044
Referees: José Martín (ESP), Luis Lopes (POR), Olegs Latisevs (LAT)

9 November 2012
20:00

Report

| Panathinaikos (Greece) | 67–79 | (Russia) Khimki |
Scoring by quarter: 23–17, 18–21, 17–20, 9–21
| Pts: Ukić 13; Rebs: Lasme 8 Asts: Diamantidis 4 | | Pts: Planinić 18; Rebs: Augustine, Lončar 8 Asts: Fridzon 5 |

O.A.C.A., Athens
Attendance: 2,500
Referees: Recep Ankarali (TUR), Emilio Perez Pizarro (ESP), Milija Vojinovic (SRB)

9 November 2012
20:45

Report

| Union Olimpija (Slovenia) | 76–89 | (Spain) Real Madrid |
Scoring by quarter: 18–21, 17–25, 22–22, 19–21
| Pts: Page 22; Rebs: Baynes 10; Asts: Three players 2 | | Pts: Fernández 18; Rebs: Reyes 7 Asts: Llull 8 |

Arena Stožice, Ljubljana
Attendance: 7,502
Referees: Luigi Lamonica (ITA), Robert Lottermoser (GER), Ioannis Foufis (GRE)

=== Game 6 ===
15 November 2012
19:30

Report

| Khimki (Russia) | 71–70 | (Turkey) Fenerbahçe Ülker |
Scoring by quarter: 17–18, 22–11, 17–22, 15–19
| Pts: Rivers 14; Rebs: Monya 6 Asts: Monya 5 | | Pts: Andersen 17; Rebs: Sato 8 Asts: Ermiş, Preldžić 4 |

Basketball Center, Khimki
Attendance: 4,250
Referees: Sasa Pukl (SLO), Spiros Gkontas (GRE), Marius Ciulin (ROM)

15 November 2012
20:00

Report

| Union Olimpija (Slovenia) | 81–79 | (Italy) Mapooro Cantù |
Scoring by quarter: 17–22, 25–17, 17–23, 22–17
| Pts: Blazic 30; Rebs: Baynes 10; Asts: Rannikko 4 | | Pts: Aradori 20; Rebs: Leunen 8 Asts: Leunen, Tabu 4 |

Arena Stožice, Ljubljana
Attendance: 4,200
Referees: Recep Ankarali (TUR), Oliver Krause (GER), Regis Bardera (FRA)

15 November 2012
21:45

Report

| Panathinaikos (Greece) | 79–68 | (Spain) Real Madrid |
Scoring by quarter: 12–16, 30–19, 23–17, 14–16
| Pts: Lasme 15; Rebs: Panko, Lasme 8 Asts: Diamantidis 8 | | Pts: Suárez 16; Rebs: Mirotić, Slaughter 5 Asts: Llull 4 |

O.A.C.A., Athens
Attendance: 9,000
Referees: Milivoje Jovcic (SRB), Srdan Dozai (CRO), Emin Mogulkoc (TUR)

=== Game 7 ===
22 November 2012
20:00

Report

| Fenerbahçe Ülker (Turkey) | 85–68 | (Slovenia) Union Olimpija |
Scoring by quarter: 22–12, 21–14, 21–22, 21–20
| Pts: Bogdanović 19; Rebs: Andersen 9 Asts: McCalebb 4 | | Pts: Page 23; Rebs: Omic 13; Asts: Waters 5 |

Ülker Sports Arena, Istanbul
Attendance: 5,300
Referees: Jakub Zamojski (POL), Eddie Viator (FRA), Renaud Geller (BEL)

23 November 2012
20:00

Report

| Mapooro Cantù (Italy) | 69–71 | (Greece) Panathinaikos |
Scoring by quarter: 15–19, 19–15, 16–20, 19–17
| Pts: Tyus 18; Rebs: Brooks 6 Asts: Tabu 8 | | Pts: Bramos 21; Rebs: Bramos 9 Asts: Diamantidis 7 |

Palasport di Desio, Desio
Attendance: 4,722
Referees: Borys Ryzhyk (UKR), Murat Biricik (TUR), Marko Juras (SRB)

23 November 2012
20:45

Report

| Real Madrid (Spain) | 104–81 | (Russia) Khimki |
Scoring by quarter: 21–23, 25–22, 33–19, 25–17
| Pts: Fernández 23; Rebs: Mirotić 8 Asts: Rodríguez 5 | | Pts: Monya 19; Rebs: Augustine 6 Asts: Planinić 6 |

Palacio de Deportes, Madrid
Attendance: 8,518
Referees: Guerrino Cerebuch (ITA), Joseph Bissang (FRA), Anastasios Piloidis (TUR)

=== Game 8 ===
29 November 2012
16:30

Report

| Khimki (Russia) | 77–53 | (Italy) Mapooro Cantù |
Scoring by quarter: 23–24, 21–7, 18–12, 15–10
| Pts: Planinić, Davis 14; Rebs: Lončar 7 Asts: Fridzon 7 | | Pts: Markoishvili 16; Rebs: Abass, Tyus 5 Asts: Tabu 4 |

Basketball Center, Khimki
Attendance: 2,150
Referees: Dani Hierrezuelo (ESP), Srdan Dozai (CRO), Radomir Vojinovic (MNE)

29 November 2012
20:00

Report

| Panathinaikos (Greece) | 80–72 | (Slovenia) Union Olimpija |
Scoring by quarter: 17–11, 18–22, 27–16, 18–23
| Pts: Ukić, Banks 14; Rebs: Lasme 8 Asts: Diamantidis 8 | | Pts: Blažič 19; Rebs: Baynes 10; Asts: Prepelič 3 |

O.A.C.A., Athens
Attendance: 5,000
Referees: Tolga Sahin (ITA), Carmelo Paternico (ITA), Petri Mantyla (FIN)

30 November 2012
20:45

Report

| Real Madrid (Spain) | 77–61 | (Turkey) Fenerbahçe Ülker |
Scoring by quarter: 16–19, 20–20, 18–13, 23–9
| Pts: Mirotić 18; Rebs: Slaughter 10; Asts: Suárez 4 | | Pts: Bogdanović 18; Rebs: Andersen 6 Asts: Preldžić 2 |

Palacio de Deportes, Madrid
Attendance: 10,137
Referees: Ilija Belosevic (SRB), Nicola Maestre (FRA), Milija Vojinovic (SRB)

=== Game 9 ===
6 December 2012
20:45

Report

| Mapooro Cantù (Italy) | 76–70 | (Spain) Real Madrid |
Scoring by quarter: 20–18, 22–17, 13–21, 21–14
| Pts: Markoishvili 23; Rebs: Abass, Cusin 7 Asts: Tabu 5 | | Pts: Carroll 24; Rebs: Reyes 10; Asts: Rodríguez 4 |

Palasport di Desio, Desio
Attendance: 4,350
Referees: Sasa Ukl (SLO), Andrej Jersan (SLO), Elias Koromilas (GRE)

7 December 2012
20:30

Report

| Union Olimpija (Slovenia) | 74–72 | (Russia) Khimki |
Scoring by quarter: 13–19, 21–12, 16–19, 24–22
| Pts: Prepelič 16; Rebs: Baynes 10; Asts: Three players 3 | | Pts: Davis 20; Rebs: Three players 4 Asts: Rivers 5 |

Arena Stožice, Ljubljana
Attendance: 4,200
Referees: Vicente Bulto (ESP), Fernando Rocha (POR), Seffi Shemmesh (ISR)

7 December 2012
21:00

Report

| Panathinaikos Athens (Greece) | 69–55 | (Turkey) Fenerbahçe Ülker İstanbul |
Scoring by quarter: 12–14, 17–9, 14–14, 26–18
| Pts: Panko 15; Rebs: Four players 6 Asts: Diamantidis 9 | | Pts: Sato 20; Rebs: Sato 8 Asts: Sato 3 |

O.A.C.A., Athens
Attendance: 15,000
Referees: Grzegorz Ziemblicki (POL), Juan Carlos Garcia Gonzalez (ESP), Antonio Conde (ESP)

=== Game 10 ===
13 December 2012
18:00

Report

| Fenerbahçe Ülker İstanbul (Turkey) | 77–69 | (Italy) Mapooro Cantù |
Scoring by quarter: 18–22, 25–16, 17–17, 17–14
| Pts: McCalebb 19; Rebs: Sato 8 Asts: McCalebb 3 | | Pts: Markoishvili 20; Rebs: Brooks 6 Asts: Brooks 6 |

Ülker Sports Arena, Istanbul
Attendance: 9,800
Referees: Juan Carlos Arteaga (ESP), Matej Boltauzer (SLO), Miguel Perez Perez (ESP)

13 December 2012
18:00

Report

| Khimki (Russia) | 78–77 | (Greece) Panathinaikos |
Scoring by quarter: 21–14, 25–25, 15–20, 17–18
| Pts: Planinić 16; Rebs: Lončar, Davis 5 Asts: Three Player 3 | | Pts: Lasme 19; Rebs: Lasme 8 Asts: Diamantidis 5 |

Basketball Center, Khimki
Attendance: 3,210
Referees: Jose Ramon Garcia Ortiz (ESP), Jakub Zamojski (POL), Damir Javor (SLO)

13 December 2012
20:45

Report

| Real Madrid (Spain) | 91–60 | (Slovenia) Union Olimpija |
Scoring by quarter: 22–15, 26–12, 20–19, 23–14
| Pts: Carroll 17; Rebs: Carroll 7 Asts: Llull 6 | | Pts: Baynes 13; Rebs: Baynes 8 Asts: Prepelic 4 |

Palacio de Deportes, Madrid
Attendance: 6,012
Referees: Roberto Chiari (ITA), Gianluca Mattioli (ITA), Aare Halliko (EST)
