= 2012–13 Eurocup Basketball =

Basketball competition

- Season: 2012–13
- Duration: 6 November 2012 – 13 April 2013
- Teams: 32

Regular season
- Season MVP: (Greece) Nick Calathes

Finals
- Champions: (Russia) Lokomotiv-Kuban (1st title)
- Runners-up: (Spain) Uxúe Bilbao
- Finals MVP: (North Macedonia) Richard Hendrix

Awards
- Rising Star: (Montenegro) Bojan Dubljević
- Coach of the Year: (Greece) Fotis Katsikaris

Statistical leaders
Points	(United States Virgin Islands) Walter Hodge	21.2
Rebounds	(United States) John Bryant	9.0
Assists	(Greece) Nick Calathes	6.7
Index Rating	(United States) Tywain McKee	23.6

2012–13 Eurocup Basketball was the 11th edition of Europe's second-tier level transnational competition for men's professional basketball clubs, the EuroCup. The EuroCup is the European-wide league level that is one level below the EuroLeague. The winner of this competition earned a place at the group stage of the next season's EuroLeague.

In this edition, semifinals were played in home-and-away series, and the final in a single game. Eurocup Qualifying Rounds were deleted.

The final game was played at Spiroudome in Charleroi, Belgium.

== Teams ==
32 teams participated in the Eurocup Regular Season:

- A total of **25 teams** qualified directly to the 32-team regular season through their results in domestic competitions, or through a wild card.
- The remaining **7 teams** were filled with the losers of the Euroleague qualifying rounds.

Already Qualified
Country (League)	Teams	Teams (rankings in 2011–12 national championships)			
Russia (PBL)	4	Lokomotiv Kuban (3)	Triumph Lyubertsy (4)	**Unics Kazan** (5)	Spartak St. Petersburg (6)
France (LNB)	3	**Le Mans Sarthe Basket** (2)	Orléans Loiret Basket (3)	Cholet Basket (4)	
Germany (BBL)	3	**Ratiopharm Ulm** (2)	Artland Dragons (3)	s.Oliver Baskets (4)	
Spain (ACB)	3	Valencia Basket (4)	Uxúe Bilbao Basket (6)	Cajasol Sevilla ^{B} (7)	
Ukraine (SuperLeague)	3	**Donetsk** (1)	Azovmash Mariupol ^{WC} (2)	Budivelnyk ^{C} (4)	
Belgium (BLB)	2	**Telenet BC Oostende** (1)	Belgacom Spirou (2)		
Poland (PLK)	2	Trefl Sopot (2)	Stelmet Zielona Góra ^{A} (3)		
Turkey (TBL)	2	Galatasaray Medical Park (3)	Banvit ^{WC} (4)		
Bulgaria (NBL)	1	**Lukoil Academic** (1)			
Croatia (A-1 Liga)	1	Cibona Zagreb ^{WC} (1)			
Czech Republic (NBL)	1	**Nymburk** (1)			
Greece (GBL)	1	Panionios On Telecom (3)			
Israel (BSL)	1	Hapoel Jerusalem ^{WC} (6)			
Italy (Serie A)	1	Banco di Sardegna Sassari (3)			
Latvia (LBL)	1	VEF Rīga (1)			
Lithuania (LKL)	1	Rūdupis Prienai ^{WC} (3)			
Montenegro (OL)	1	Budućnost VOLI Podgorica (1)			
Serbia (KLS)	1	Crvena zvezda ^{WC} (2)			

- **Bold** indicates that these teams qualified as losers from the Euroleague qualifying rounds.
- **^A** Stelmet Zielona Góra joined the Eurocup after VAP Kolossos resigned its berth.
- **^B** Cajasol Sevilla joined the Eurocup after Lagun Aro GBC resigned its berth.
- **^C** Budivelnik Kyiv joined the Eurocup after EiffelTowers Den Bosch resigned its berth.
- **^WC** indicates that these teams qualified through a wild card.

== Draw ==
The draws for the 2012–13 Eurocup were held on Tuesday, 9 October, after the Euroleague Qualifying Rounds were played.

Teams were seeded into four pots of eight teams, according to their points in the European basketball club rankings.

Pot 1	Pot 2	Pot 3	Pot 4
(Spain) Valencia BC (Russia) Unics Kazan (Czech Republic) ČEZ Basketball Nymburk (Spain) Uxúe Bilbao Basket (Turkey) Galatasaray Medical Park (Spain) Cajasol Sevilla (France) Le Mans Sarthe Basket (Russia) BC Spartak Saint Petersburg	(Israel) Hapoel Jerusalem (Russia) Lokomotiv Kuban Krasnodar (Russia) BC Triumph Lyubertsy (Greece) Panionios BC (Croatia) Cibona Zagreb (Italy) Banco di Sardegna Sassari (Turkey) Banvit BK Bandırma (Montenegro) KK Budućnost	(Latvia) VEF Rīga (France) Cholet Basket (Belgium) Belgacom Spirou (Ukraine) BC Donetsk (Ukraine) Budivelnyk Kyiv (Belgium) Telenet Oostende (Ukraine) Azovmash Mariupol (Serbia) Crvena zvezda	(France) Orléans Loiret Basket (Lithuania) BC Prienai (Poland) Trefl Sopot (Poland) Stelmet Zielona Góra (Germany) Ratiopharm Ulm (Germany) Artland Dragons (Germany) s.Oliver Baskets (Bulgaria) PBC Lukoil Academic

== Regular season ==
Location of teams of the Regular season in 2012–13 Eurocup Basketball.
Red: Group A; Green: Group B; Blue: Group C; Yellow: Group D; Purple: Group E; Orange: Group F; Pink: Group G; Brown: Group H.

The top two teams from each group advanced to the top 16. The match-days were on 7 November, 14 November, 27 November, 5 December and 12 December 2012.

Tiebreakers
If teams were level on record at the end of the Regular Season, tiebreakers were applied in the following order:
1. Head-to-head record.
2. Head-to-head point differential.
3. Point differential during the regular season.
4. Points scored during the regular season.
5. Sum of quotients of points scored and points allowed in each Regular Season match.

Key to colors
Top two teams in each group advance to Last 16.

=== Group A ===
	Team	Pld	W	L	PF	PA	Diff	Tie-break
1.	(Ukraine) BC Budivelnyk Kyiv	6	4	2	469	441	+28	
2.	(Czech Republic) ČEZ Nymburk	6	3	3	469	451	+18	1–1 (+9)
3.	(Israel) Hapoel Jerusalem	6	3	3	473	475	–2	1–1 (–9)
4.	(Lithuania) BC Prienai	6	2	4	444	488	–44	

=== Group B ===
	Team	Pld	W	L	PF	PA	Diff	Tie-break
1.	(Spain) Uxúe Bilbao Basket	6	6	0	490	421	+69	
2.	(Montenegro) KK Budućnost VOLI	6	4	2	418	388	+30	
3.	(Bulgaria) PBC Lukoil Academic	6	2	4	423	452	–29	
4.	(Belgium) Belgacom Spirou	6	0	6	397	467	–70	

=== Group C ===
	Team	Pld	W	L	PF	PA	Diff	Tie-break
1.	(Russia) BC Triumph Lyubertsy	6	6	0	505	473	+32	
2.	(Latvia) BC VEF Rīga	6	3	3	475	473	+2	
3.	(France) Le Mans Sarthe	6	2	4	454	429	+25	
4.	(Germany) Artland Dragons	6	1	5	444	503	–59	

=== Group D ===
	Team	Pld	W	L	PF	PA	Diff	Tie-break
1.	(Spain) Valencia BC	6	5	1	520	439	+81	
2.	(Turkey) Banvit B.K.	6	4	2	522	485	+37	
3.	(Germany) s.Oliver Baskets	6	3	3	460	509	–49	
4.	(Ukraine) BC Azovmash Mariupol	6	0	6	455	524	–69	

=== Group E ===
	Team	Pld	W	L	PF	PA	Diff	Tie-break
1.	(Russia) PBC Lokomotiv-Kuban	6	4	2	471	437	+34	1–1 (+1)
2.	(Turkey) Galatasaray Medical Park	6	4	2	492	446	+46	1–1 (–1)
3.	(Ukraine) BC Donetsk	6	3	3	461	459	+2	
4.	(Poland) Trefl Sopot	6	1	5	460	542	–82	

=== Group F ===
	Team	Pld	W	L	PF	PA	Diff	Tie-break
1.	(Russia) BC UNICS Kazan	6	5	1	481	442	+39	
2.	(Poland) Stelmet Zielona Góra	6	3	3	477	446	+31	
3.	(Belgium) BC Telenet Oostende	6	2	4	464	482	–18	1–1 (+18)
4.	(Greece) Panionios B.C.	6	2	4	466	518	–52	1–1 (–18)

=== Group G ===
	Team	Pld	W	L	PF	PA	Diff	Tie-break
1.	(Russia) BC Spartak Saint Petersburg	6	6	0	468	389	+79	
2.	(Germany) Ratiopharm Ulm	6	3	3	476	457	+19	1–1 (+20)
3.	(France) Cholet Basket	6	3	3	444	456	–12	1–1 (–20)
4.	(Croatia) KK Cibona	6	0	6	414	500	–86	

=== Group H ===
	Team	Pld	W	L	PF	PA	Diff	Tie-break
1.	(Serbia) Crvena Zvezda Telekom	6	5	1	556	515	+41	
2.	(Spain) Cajasol Sevilla	6	3	3	483	471	+12	
3.	(France) Orléans Loiret	6	2	4	465	478	–13	2–0
4.	(Italy) Dinamo Sassari	6	2	4	516	556	–40	0–2

== Last 16 ==
The Last 16 phase began January 9.

If teams were level on record at the end of the Last 16 phase, tiebreakers were applied in the following order:

1. Head-to-head record.
2. Head-to-head point differential.
3. Point differential during the Last 16 phase.
4. Points scored during the Last 16 phase.
5. Sum of quotients of points scored and points allowed in each Last 16 phase match.

Key to colors
Top two teams in each group advance to quarterfinals.

=== Group I ===
	Team	Pld	W	L	PF	PA	Diff	Tie-break
1.	(Ukraine) BC Budivelnyk Kyiv	6	4	2	486	478	+8	
2.	(Montenegro) KK Budućnost VOLI	6	3	3	456	436	+20	1–1 (+7)
3.	(Turkey) Banvit B.K.	6	3	3	477	479	–2	1–1 (–7)
4.	(Russia) BC Triumph Lyubertsy	6	2	4	478	504	–26	

=== Group J ===
	Team	Pld	W	L	PF	PA	Diff	Tie-break
1.	(Spain) Uxúe Bilbao Basket	6	4	2	470	454	+16	2–0
2.	(Spain) Valencia BC	6	4	2	511	462	+49	0–2
3.	(Latvia) BC VEF Rīga	6	3	3	508	480	+28	
4.	(Czech Republic) ČEZ Nymburk	6	1	5	425	518	–93	

=== Group K ===
	Team	Pld	W	L	PF	PA	Diff	Tie-break
1.	(Russia) PBC Lokomotiv-Kuban	6	5	1	515	475	+40	
2.	(Russia) BC Spartak Saint Petersburg	6	3	3	456	411	+45	2–0
3.	(Poland) Stelmet Zielona Góra	6	3	3	465	502	–37	0–2
4.	(Spain) Cajasol Sevilla	6	1	5	427	475	–48	

=== Group L ===
	Team	Pld	W	L	PF	PA	Diff	Tie-break
1.	(Russia) BC UNICS Kazan	6	4	2	461	443	+18	
2.	(Germany) Ratiopharm Ulm	6	3	3	516	496	+20	1–1 (+5)
3.	(Turkey) Galatasaray Medical Park	6	3	3	459	459	0	1–1 (–5)
4.	(Serbia) Crvena Zvezda Telekom	6	2	4	476	514	–38	

== Knockout stage ==
=== Bracket ===
Quarterfinals
(Spain) Uxúe Bilbao	81	101	182
(Germany) ratiopharm Ulm	81	78	159
(Ukraine) Budivelnyk	72	73	145
(Russia) Spartak St. Petersburg	83	56	139
(Russia) UNICS	70	71	141
(Spain) Valencia	80	68	148
(Russia) Lokomotiv Kuban	72	90	162
(Montenegro) Budućnost VOLI	54	65	119

Semifinals
(Spain) Uxúe Bilbao	93	75	168
(Ukraine) Budivelnyk	83	53	136
(Spain) Valencia	87	68	155
(Russia) Lokomotiv Kuban	97	63	160

Finals
13 April – Charleroi
(Spain) Uxúe Bilbao	64
(Russia) Lokomotiv Kuban	75

=== Quarterfinals ===
The quarterfinals were two-legged ties determined on aggregate score. The first legs were played on March 6, and the return legs were played on March 13. The group winner in each tie, listed as "Team #1", hosted the second leg.

Team 1	Agg.	Team 2	1st leg	2nd leg
Budivelnyk (Ukraine)	145–139	(Russia) Spartak St. Petersburg	72–83	73–56
Uxúe Bilbao (Spain)	182–163	(Germany) ratiopharm Ulm	81–85	101–78
Lokomotiv Kuban (Russia)	162–119	(Montenegro) Budućnost VOLI	72–54	90–65
UNICS (Russia)	141–148	(Spain) Valencia	70–80	71–68

=== Semifinals ===
The semifinals were two-legged ties determined on aggregate score. The first legs were played on March 20, and the return legs were played on March 26–27. The team finishing in the higher Last 16 place, listed as "Team #1", hosted the second leg.

Team 1	Agg.	Team 2	1st leg	2nd leg
Uxúe Bilbao (Spain)	168–136	(Ukraine) Budivelnyk	93–83	75–53
Lokomotiv Kuban (Russia)	160–155	(Spain) Valencia	97–87	63–68

=== Final ===
The final took place on April 13, 2013, in Spiroudome, Charleroi, Belgium.

13 April 2013
21:00

Report

Uxúe Bilbao (Spain)	64–75	(Russia) Lokomotiv Kuban
Scoring by quarter: 17-16, 13-22, 15-16, 19-21
Pts: Vasileiadis 16; Rebs: Three players 6 Asts: López 4		Pts: Hendrix 14; Rebs: Marić 10; Asts: Calathes 7

Spiroudome, Charleroi
Attendance: 3,862
Referees: Fernando Rocha (POR), Tolga Sahin (ITA), Robert Lottermoser (GER)

Eurocup 2013 Champions

PBC Lokomotiv Kuban
First title

== Individual statistics ==
=== Rating ===
Rank	Name	Team	Games	Rating	PIR
1.	(United States) Tywain McKee	(Russia) BC Triumph Lyubertsy	11	260	23.64
2.	(United States Virgin Islands) Walter Hodge	(Poland) Stelmet Zielona Góra	12	269	22.42
3.	(Azerbaijan) Chuck Davis	(Turkey) Banvit B.K.	12	260	21.67
4.	(United States) Chuck Eidson	(Russia) BC UNICS Kazan	14	287	20.50
5.	(United States) John Bryant	(Germany) Ratiopharm Ulm	13	260	20.00

=== Points ===
Rank	Name	Team	Games	Points	PPG
1.	(United States Virgin Islands) Walter Hodge	(Poland) Stelmet Zielona Góra	12	254	21.17
2.	(Serbia) Igor Rakočević	(Serbia) Crvena Zvezda Telekom	11	215	19.55
3.	(Azerbaijan) Chuck Davis	(Turkey) Banvit B.K.	12	222	18.50
4.	(United States) Tywain McKee	(Russia) BC Triumph Lyubertsy	11	197	17.91
5.	(United States) Chuck Eidson	(Russia) BC UNICS Kazan	14	231	16.50

=== Rebounds ===
Rank	Name	Team	Games	Rebounds	RPG
1.	(United States) John Bryant	(Germany) Ratiopharm Ulm	13	117	9.00
2.	(Australia) Aleks Marić	(Russia) PBC Lokomotiv Kuban	14	104	7.43
3.	(Serbia) Oliver Stević	(Poland) Stelmet Zielona Góra	12	89	7.42
4.	(United States) Leo Lyons	(Ukraine) Budivelnyk Kyiv	16	117	7.31
5.	(Canada) Kyle Landry	(Russia) BC Triumph Lyubertsy	11	78	7.09

=== Assists ===
Rank	Name	Team	Games	Assists	APG
1.	(Greece) Nick Calathes	(Russia) PBC Lokomotiv Kuban	17	113	6.65
2.	(United States) Tywain McKee	(Russia) BC Triumph Lyubertsy	11	67	6.09
3.	(Bosnia and Herzegovina) Zack Wright	(Russia) BC Spartak Saint Petersburg	14	77	5.50
4.	(United States Virgin Islands) Walter Hodge	(Poland) Stelmet Zielona Góra	12	65	5.42
5.	(Lithuania) Mantas Kalnietis	(Russia) PBC Lokomotiv Kuban	12	59	4.92

== Awards ==
=== MVP Weekly ===
==== Regular season ====
Week	Player	Team	PIR
1	(Belgium) Matt Lojeski	(Belgium) BC Telenet Oostende	34
2	(Dominican Republic) Sammy Mejia	(Turkey) Banvit B.K.	35
2	(United States) Tywain McKee	(Russia) BC Triumph Lyubertsy	35
3	(United States) Tywain McKee (2)	(Russia) BC Triumph Lyubertsy	42
4	(Azerbaijan) Charles Davis	(Turkey) Banvit B.K.	36
5	(United States) Courtney Fells	(Israel) Hapoel Jerusalem	41
6	(United States) Derrick Brown	(Russia) Lokomotiv-Kuban	39

==== Top 16 ====
Week	Player	Team	PIR
1	(Serbia) Čedomir Vitkovac	(Montenegro) Budućnost VOLI	40
2	(Bulgaria) E. J. Rowland	(Latvia) VEF Rīga	36
3	(Serbia) Čedomir Vitkovac (2)	(Montenegro) Budućnost VOLI	30
4	(United States) John Bryant	(Germany) Ratiopharm Ulm	36
5	(United States Virgin Islands) Walter Hodge	(Poland) Stelmet Zielona Góra	42
6	(United States Virgin Islands) Walter Hodge (2)	(Poland) Stelmet Zielona Góra	39

==== Quarterfinals ====
Game	Player	Team	PIR
1	(United States) John Bryant (2)	(Germany) Ratiopharm Ulm	30
2	(Lithuania) Simas Jasaitis	(Russia) Lokomotiv-Kuban	28

==== Semifinals ====
Game	Player	Team	PIR
1	(Lithuania) Simas Jasaitis (2)	(Russia) Lokomotiv-Kuban	33
2	(Serbia) Stefan Marković	(Spain) Valencia BC	22

=== Eurocup MVP ===
- (Greece) Nick Calathes (Lokomotiv-Kuban)

=== Eurocup Finals MVP ===
- (North Macedonia) Richard Hendrix (Lokomotiv-Kuban)

=== All-Eurocup Teams ===
Position	All-Eurocup First Team	Club team	All-Eurocup Second Team	Club team
PG	(Greece) Nick Calathes	(Russia) Lokomotiv-Kuban	(United States Virgin Islands) Walter Hodge	(Poland) Stelmet Zielona Góra
SG/SF	(United States) Malcolm Delaney	(Ukraine) Budivelnyk Kyiv	(United States) Chuck Eidson	(Russia) BC UNICS Kazan
SG/SF	(Greece) Kostas Vasileiadis	(Spain) Uxúe Bilbao Basket	(United States) Derrick Brown	(Russia) Lokomotiv-Kuban
PF/C	(Kosovo) Justin Doellman	(Spain) Valencia	(United States) Lamont Hamilton	(Spain) Uxúe Bilbao Basket
PF/C	(United States) John Bryant	(Germany) Ratiopharm Ulm	(Greece) Loukas Mavrokefalides	(Russia) BC Spartak Saint Petersburg

=== Coach of the Year ===
- (Greece) Fotis Katsikaris (Uxúe Bilbao Basket)

=== Rising Star ===
- (Montenegro) Bojan Dubljević (Valencia Basket)

== See also ==
- 2012–13 Euroleague
- EuroChallenge 2012–13
