= Awudu Abass =

Italian basketball player (born 1993)

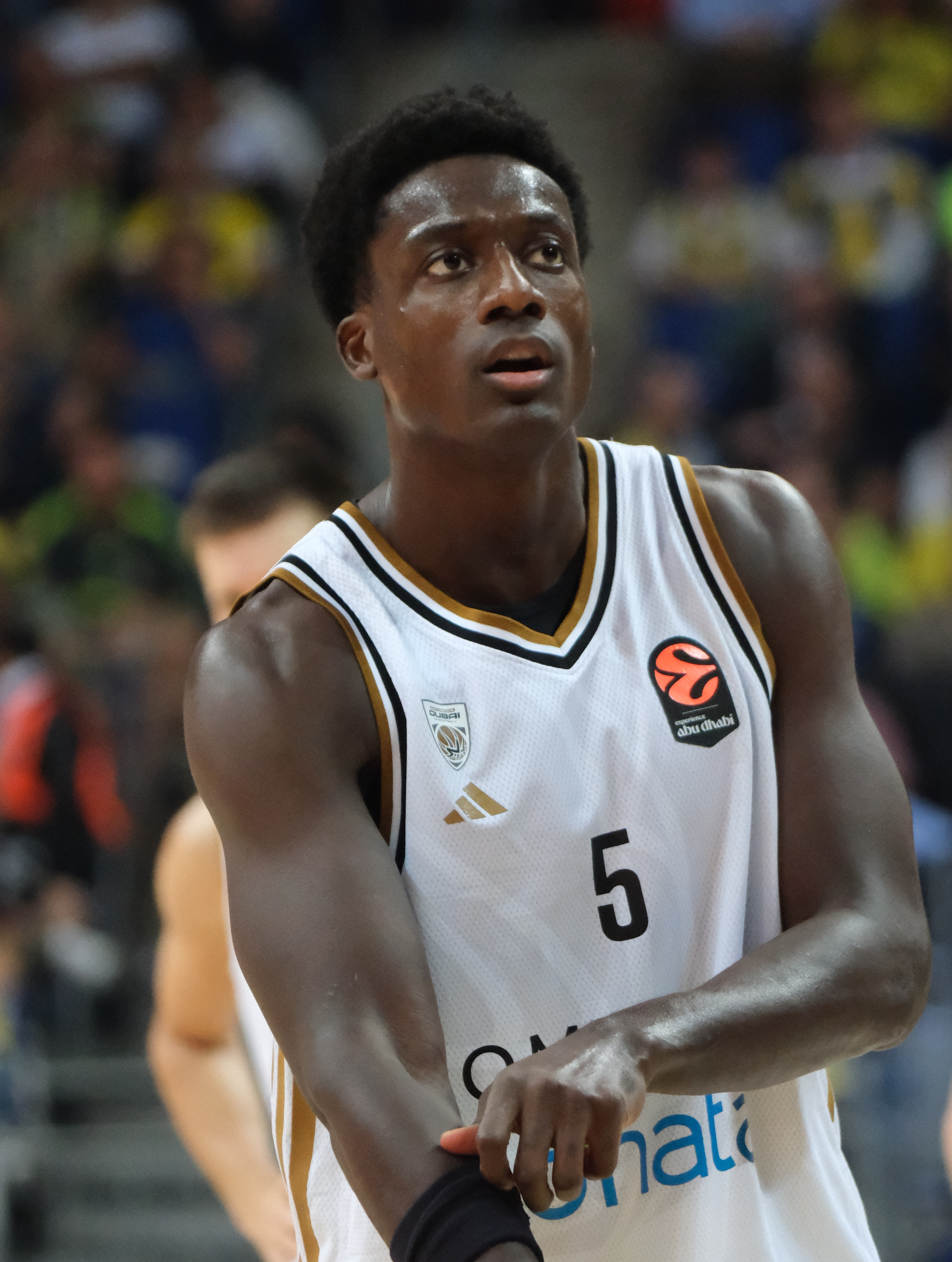
- Abass with Dubai Basketball in 2025

No. 50 – Virtus Bologna
- Position: Small forward
- League: LBA; EuroLeague

Personal information
- Born: 27 January 1993 (age 33) Como, Italy
- Listed height: 2.00 m (6 ft 7 in)
- Listed weight: 90.5 kg (200 lb)

Career information
- NBA draft: 2015: undrafted
- Playing career: 2010–present

Career history
- 2010–2016: Pallacanestro Cantù
- 2016–2018: Olimpia Milano
- 2018–2020: Brescia Leonessa
- 2020–2024: Virtus Bologna
- 2024–2026: Dubai Basketball
- 2026–present: Virtus Bologna

Career highlights
- EuroCup champion (2022); 2× Italian League champion (2018, 2021); ABA League champion (2026); 6× Italian Supercup winner (2012, 2016, 2017, 2021–2023); 2× LBA All-Star (2013, 2014)
Medals
Men's basketball
Representing Italy
European U-20 Championship
Gold medal – first place	2013 Tallinn

Awudu Abass Abass (born 27 January 1993) is an Italian professional basketball player for Virtus Bologna of the Italian Lega Basket Serie A and the EuroLeague. Standing at 1.98 m (6 ft 6 in), he plays at the small forward position. He has had a successful career in Italian basketball, winning the Italian League twice, winning the EuroCup, and playing for Cantu, Milano, Brescia and Bologna.

== Professional career ==
=== Pallacanestro Cantù (2010–2016) ===
Abass joined local club Pallacanestro Cantù as a teenager, progressing quickly through the youth ranks to make his debut in 2011 aged only 18. He was too young to make an immediate impact, playing sparingly in his first three seasons, he did however grab minutes, and rebounds, in Europe's top-tier level EuroLeague, playing in two games, one against powerhouse Real Madrid.

The 2013–14 proved to be his breakthrough season, he earned regular minutes in the LBA and European second tier EuroCup, as a youth product he became a fan favourite and was awarded the captaincy the next season, becoming the youngest captain of Cantù's history.

=== Olimpia Milano (2016–2018) ===
On 1 July 2026, Abass signed with Olimpia Milano of the Lega Basket Serie A (LBA) and the EuroLeague.

=== Brescia Leonessa (2018–2020) ===
On 19 July 2018, Abass signed a two-year deal with Brescia Leonessa.

=== Virtus Bologna (2020–2024) ===
After two important seasons with Brescia, during which he became one of the most prominent Italian players of the league, in June 2020, he signed with Virtus Bologna. After having knocked out 3–0 both Basket Treviso in the quarterfinals and New Basket Brindisi in the semifinals, on 11 June 2021 Virtus defeated 4–0 its historic rival Olimpia Milano in the national finals, winning its 16th national title and the first one after twenty years. On 21 September, the team won its second Supercup, defeating Olimpia Milano 90–84. Moreover, after having ousted Lietkabelis, Ulm and Valencia in the first three rounds of the playoffs, on 11 May 2022, Virtus defeated Frutti Extra Bursaspor by 80–67 at the Segafredo Arena, winning its first EuroCup and qualifying for the EuroLeague after 14 years. However, despite having ended the regular season at the first place and having ousted 3–0 both Pesaro and Tortona in the first two rounds of playoffs, Virtus was defeated 4–2 in the national finals by Olimpia Milan. On 29 September 2022, after having ousted Olimpia Milano in the semifinals, Virtus won its third Supercup, defeating 72–69 Banco di Sardegna Sassari and achieving a back-to-back, following the 2021 trophy. However, Abass did not play due to an injury. However, despite good premises Virtus ended the EuroLeague season at the 14th place, thus it did not qualify for the playoffs. Moreover, the team was defeated in the Italian Basketball Cup final by Brescia. In June, after having ousted 3–0 both Brindisi and Tortona, Virtus was defeated 4–3 by Olimpia Milan in the national finals, following a series which was widely regarded among the best in the latest years of Italian basketball.

On 10 July 2023, Abass renewed his contract with Virtus for another season. On 24 September, after having ousted Olimpia Milano in the semifinals, Virtus won its fourth Supercup, and the third in a row, defeating 97–60 Germani Brescia.

=== Dubai Basketball (2024–2026) ===
On 21 July 2024, Abass signed with Dubai Basketball of the ABA League. On 27 June 2025, Abass agreed to a contract extension until the end of the 2025–26 season with Dubai after joining the EuroLeague. In 2026, he won his first ABA league title, defeating Partizan in the finals.

On 20 November 2026, Abass parted ways with the club.

=== Return to Virtus Bologna (2026–present) ===
On the same day, Abass returned to Virtus Bologna, rejoining the club after two seasons.

== National team career ==
Abass was called up soon after officially becoming Italian, joining the Under-20 side of the Italian national basketball team that won gold at the 2013 FIBA Europe Under-20 Championship, where he was part of the All Tournament Team. He represented the Italian National Basketball team at the 2019 FIBA Basketball World Cup in China, where he averaged 8 points, 3 rebounds and 0.3 assists.

== Career statistics ==
Legend
GP	Games played	GS	Games started	MPG	Minutes per game
FG%	Field-goal percentage	3P%	3-point field-goal percentage	FT%	Free-throw percentage
RPG	Rebounds per game	APG	Assists per game	SPG	Steals per game
BPG	Blocks per game	PPG	Points per game	PIR	Performance index rating
**Bold**	Career high

=== EuroLeague ===
Year	Team	GP	GS	MPG	FG%	3P%	FT%	RPG	APG	SPG	BPG	PPG	PIR
2012–13	Cantù	2	0	**18.5**	.250	.200	—	**6.0**	—	**1.0**	—	3.5	4.5
2016–17	Olimpia Milano	23	**11**	16.0	.420	.421	.840	1.9	.5	.4	**.3**	4.6	3.7
2017–18	Olimpia Milano	10	0	4.7	.200	.125	.667	1.1	.2	.5	—	0.9	0.7
2022–23	Virtus Bologna	7	3	16.7	**.581**	**.588**	**1.000**	1.0	**.7**	.6	**.3**	**6.7**	**5.7**
2023–24	Virtus Bologna	**31**	2	12.8	.410	.316	.846	1.7	.4	.4	.1	4.4	3.5
Career		73	16	13.3	.414	.361	.833	1.7	.4	.4	.2	4.2	3.4

== Personal life ==
Awudu Abass Abass father is originally from Ghana whilst his mother is from Nigeria (not Togo as erroneously reported by some sources), they met in Rome where they married before moving to Como where Awudu was born. He obtained Italian citizenship as soon as he could, at the age of 18, having to wait that long as he was born to foreign nationals.

Abass still lived in Como, in 2012, at only 19, he was a candidate for the municipal elections as second on the Amo la Mia Città list, however it obtained only one seat so he was not elected.
