= Chuck Eidson =

American basketball player

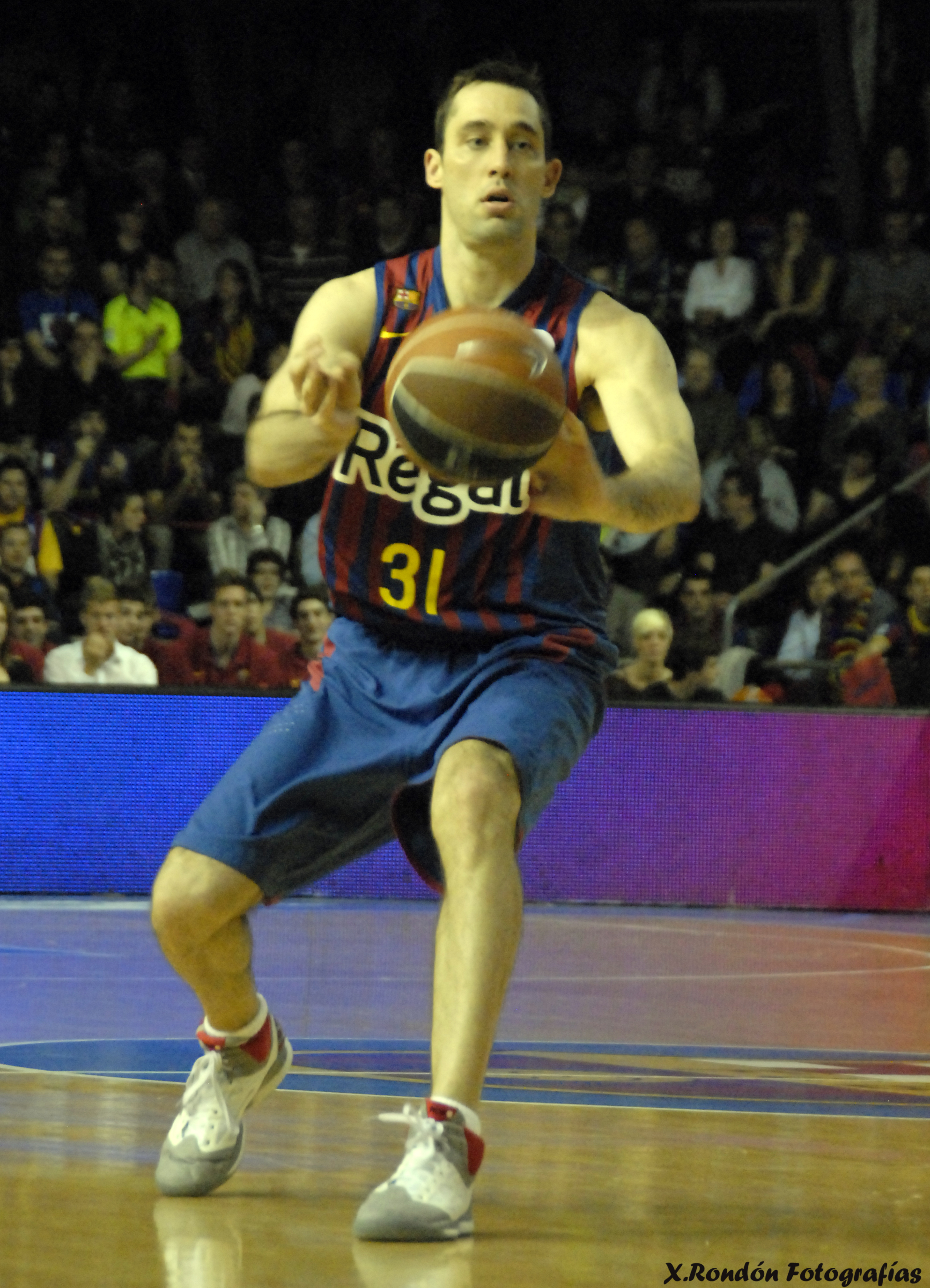
- Eidson with Barcelona in 2012

Personal information
- Born: October 10, 1980 (age 46) Summerville, South Carolina, U.S.
- Listed height: 6 ft 8 in (2.03 m)
- Listed weight: 220 lb (100 kg)

Career information
- High school: Pinewood Preparatory School (Summerville, South Carolina)
- College: South Carolina (1999–2003)
- NBA draft: 2003: undrafted
- Playing career: 2003–2014
- Position: Forward / guard

Career history
- 2003–2004: North Charleston Lowgators
- 2004–2006: Gießen 46ers
- 2006–2007: SIG Strasbourg
- 2007–2009: Lietuvos rytas
- 2009–2011: Maccabi Tel Aviv
- 2011–2012: Barcelona
- 2012–2014: UNICS Kazan

Career highlights
- EuroLeague steals leader (2011); EuroCup champion (2009); EuroCup MVP (2009); All-EuroCup First Team (2009); All-EuroCup Second Team (2013); LKL champion (2009); Baltic League champion (2009); Baltic League Finals MVP (2009); LKF Cup winner (2009); 2× LKL All-Star (2008, 2009); LKL All-Star Game MVP (2009); LKL Finals MVP (2009); LKL MVP (2009); Israeli Premier League champion (2011); 2× Israeli Cup winner (2010, 2011); Liga ACB champion (2012); Spanish Supercup winner (2011); Russian Cup winner (2014); 2× All-German Bundesliga Team (2005, 2006); German Bundesliga Best Offensive Player (2005); Third-team Parade All-American (1999); South Carolina Mr. Basketball (1999); No. 13 retired by Rytas Vilnius

Charles Patrick Eidson Jr. (born October 10, 1980), commonly known as Chuck Eidson, is an American former professional basketball player. He is 2.03 m (6 ft 8 in) tall and he played mainly at the small forward position. He could also play at both the point guard and shooting guard positions, as well as a point forward.

== High school ==
Eidson played high school basketball at Pinewood Preparatory School, where he was a Parade All-American and South Carolina Gatorade Player of the Year. He also played at the Albert Schweitzer Tournament in 1998, and at the Nike Hoop Summit in 1999.

== College career ==
Eidson played college basketball at the University of South Carolina, with the Gamecocks men's basketball team.

== Professional career ==
After his college career with the University of South Carolina Gamecocks, Eidson spent a season with the North Charleston Lowgators of the NBDL. After a short stint with the Boston Celtics, he signed a one-year deal with the Gießen 46ers in the German Basketball Bundesliga. The team, that was on the verge of relegation the season before, was brought back to life by Eidson, who led the 46ers to the Bundesliga playoffs against RheinEnergie Köln. In the decisive game five, Eidson scored 40 points, leading Gießen to a 3–2 series win and straight to the semifinals, where they lost against the eventual champion GHP Bamberg. For his stellar performance, the Small Forward was named the 2004–05 Bundesliga Best Offensive Player. In a pre-season game versus EnBW Ludwigsburg the following fall, Eidson suffered a torn ACL and sat out 172 days before returning to the starting lineup of the 46ers in a Bundesliga game against BG Karlsruhe. Only three games later, Eidson torched TBB Trier for 41 points. After the season, Eidson left Germany and signed with Strasbourg IG in the French Pro A, where he also gained EuroCup experience. One year later, he signed with the Lithuanian powerhouse Lietuvos rytas of Vilnius.

When Eidson came to Lietuvos rytas, he quickly became a starter, and one of the team's leaders. His most memorable performance was in the EuroLeague game against Maccabi Tel Aviv, when he scored 28 points and led the team to victory. FC Barcelona Bàsquet attempted to buy his contract out, but he remained with Lietuvos Rytas.

In the 2008–09 season, he won the EuroCup with the team also earning the EuroCup MVP award, averaging 15.9 points and 21.3 PIR per game. He also led the team to a Baltic League title that season, scoring a career high 41 points in the final against BC Žalgiris, earning him the Baltic League Finals MVP award.

In 2009, he moved to the Israeli League club Maccabi Tel Aviv, signing a two-year contract, estimated 1.5M$ net income for the whole period. In his second season with Maccabi, Eidson led the team to the EuroLeague Final with a great performance in the semifinal against Real Madrid: 19 points on 66 percent shooting, along with eight rebounds and six steals for a PIR of 33. In the finals Maccabi lost to Panathinaikos.

In 2011, he left Maccabi Tel Aviv and signed a lucrative contract with FC Barcelona. In Barcelona, Eidson was released due to cutting of the budget.

His next station was the Russian League club UNICS, where he signed a two-year contract. He failed to qualify with the team to the 2012–13 Euroleague, ending up instead in the 2012–13 EuroCup season. He was named to the All-Eurocup Second Team in 2013.

On 18 April 2024, Rytas Vilnius retired Eidson's jersey No. 13.

== Career statistics ==
Legend
GP	Games played	GS	Games started	MPG	Minutes per game
FG%	Field-goal percentage	3P%	3-point field-goal percentage	FT%	Free-throw percentage
RPG	Rebounds per game	APG	Assists per game	SPG	Steals per game
BPG	Blocks per game	PPG	Points per game	PIR	Performance index rating
**Bold**	Career high

=== EuroLeague ===
*	Led the league

Year	Team	GP	GS	MPG	FG%	3P%	FT%	RPG	APG	SPG	BPG	PPG	PIR
2007–08	Rytas	18	15	29.2	.430	**.489**	.778	4.1	2.7	2.2	**.2**	**12.2**	12.7
2009–10	Maccabi	20	19	**32.6**	.398	.329	**.791**	**4.5**	2.6	1.2	**.2**	12.0	13.4
2010–11	Maccabi	**22**	**20**	29.3	**.434**	.339	.705	4.3	**3.5**	**2.6***	.1	9.7	**14.3**
2011–12	Barcelona	18	14	20.7	.405	.365	.786	3.4	2.3	1.2	.1	7.7	9.2
Career		78	68	28.1	.417	.373	.765	4.1	2.8	1.8	.2	10.4	12.5
