= Bobby Brown (basketball) =

American basketball player (born 1984)

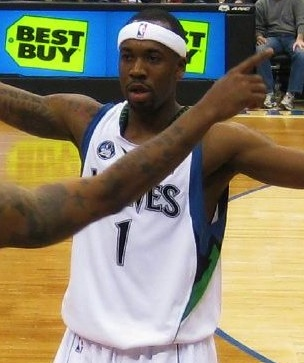
- Brown with the Minnesota Timberwolves in 2009

Cal State Fullerton Titans
- Title: Director of player development
- League: Big West Conference

Personal information
- Born: September 24, 1984 (age 42) Los Angeles, California, U.S.
- Listed height: 6 ft 2 in (1.88 m)
- Listed weight: 175 lb (79 kg)

Career information
- High school: Westchester (Los Angeles, California)
- College: Cal State Fullerton (2003–2007)
- NBA draft: 2007: undrafted
- Playing career: 2007–2021
- Position: Point guard
- Number: 5, 1, 6, 8

Career history
- 2007–2008: Alba Berlin
- 2008–2009: Sacramento Kings
- 2009: Minnesota Timberwolves
- 2009–2010: New Orleans Hornets
- 2010: Los Angeles Clippers
- 2010: Asseco Prokom Gdynia
- 2010–2011: Aris Thessaloniki
- 2011–2012: EWE Baskets Oldenburg
- 2012–2013: Montepaschi Siena
- 2013–2016: Dongguan / Shenzhen Leopards
- 2016: Beşiktaş Sompo Japan
- 2016–2018: Houston Rockets
- 2018: Olympiacos
- 2018: Mornar
- 2018–2019: Shanxi Brave Dragons
- 2020: PAOK Thessaloniki
- 2021: NBA G League Ignite

Career highlights
- Alphonso Ford EuroLeague Top Scorer Trophy (2013); LBA champion (2013); Italian Cup winner (2013); Greek All-Star Game 3 Point Shootout Champion (2020); Bundesliga champion (2008); Bundesliga Top Scorer (2012); Bundesliga Newcomer of the Year (2008); First-team All-Big West (2006)
- Stats at NBA.com
- Stats at Basketball Reference
Medals
Representing the United States
Pan American Games
Bronze medal – third place	2015 Toronto

Robert Douglas Brown (born September 24, 1984) is an American former professional basketball player who is the director of player development for the Cal State Fullerton Titans men's basketball team. Standing at 6 ft 2 in (1.88 m), he played the point guard position.

After graduating from Cal State Fullerton, Brown entered the 2007 NBA draft, but went undrafted. In his first pro season, he played overseas with the German League team Alba Berlin, and in 2008, he returned to the United States, where he played for several NBA teams, including the Sacramento Kings, Minnesota Timberwolves, New Orleans Hornets, and the Los Angeles Clippers.

While playing for Montepaschi Siena in the 2012–14 season, Brown tied a EuroLeague scoring record since the 2000–01 season, with 41 points (the all-time EuroLeague single-game scoring record is 99 points, held by Radivoj Korać). Brown won the EuroLeague's Alphonso Ford EuroLeague Top Scorer Trophy in 2013.

== High school ==
Brown attended Westchester High School, in Los Angeles, California, where he played high school basketball. He played alongside future NBA players Trevor Ariza and Hassan Adams.

== College career ==
After high school, he went on to play NCAA Division I college basketball at California State University, Fullerton, where he played with the Cal State Fullerton Titans, from 2003 to 2007. Brown was selected to the All-Big West Conference First Team, of the 2005–06 season. In his 4 years with the Titans, he scored 1,961 points, in 116 games (16.9 points per game), making him the school's all-time leader in total points scored, at the time.

== Professional career ==
=== Early years ===
Brown left Cal State Fullerton in 2007, but ultimately went undrafted in the 2007 NBA draft. He signed with the German team ALBA Berlin in August 2007, whom he helped win the German national domestic league. He was also a participant in a five-overtime European second-tier level EuroCup game, in which he top-scored with 44 points, the second-highest total ever in the competition.

=== First NBA stint ===
In 2008, Brown returned to the U.S., and played for the New Orleans Hornets in the NBA Summer League, with his highlight being a game-winning shot against the Charlotte Bobcats, in a 77–75 win. He was rewarded for his stellar summer league play, by his being offered a two-year contract with the Sacramento Kings, one of a handful of NBA teams that courted him. He was also pursued by multiple overseas teams that had offered him lucrative deals, among them the Israeli league's Maccabi Tel Aviv. He also came close to accepting a multi-year contract, "in the millions", from the Spanish league's FC Barcelona.

On February 19, 2009, Brown was traded to the Minnesota Timberwolves, along with Shelden Williams, in exchange for Rashad McCants and Calvin Booth. On September 9, he was traded to the New Orleans Hornets, along with Darius Songaila, in exchange for Antonio Daniels, and a 2014 second round pick. On January 26, 2010, Brown was again traded to the Los Angeles Clippers, for a conditional 2014 2nd round pick and cash considerations.

In July 2010, Brown joined the Toronto Raptors for the 2010 NBA Summer League.

=== Return to Europe ===
On September 22, 2010, Brown signed with the Polish League team Asseco Prokom, but he was released in December, due to poor performances in the EuroLeague. In his first EuroLeague season, he averaged 10.7 points in 26 minutes per game, over six games, with Asseco Prokom, but shot only .333 percent from the field. On December 3, 2010, he signed a two-month contract with the Greek League club Aris, in order to replace Pierre Pierce, who was sidelined for two months with an injury. In 35 games, he averaged 12.2 points, 2.3 rebounds, 3.0 assists and 0.8 steals in 28.7 minutes.

On August 5, 2011, Brown signed with the German League team EWE Baskets Oldenburg.

=== Montepaschi Siena ===
On August 8, 2012, Brown signed a one-year contract with the Italian League team Montepaschi Siena. He replaced 2011–12 Alphonso Ford top scoring trophy winner Bo McCalebb, who joined Fenerbahçe Ülker a week before. He won the EuroLeague 2012–13 Alphonso Ford EuroLeague Top Scorer Trophy, averaging 18.8 points per game. He was also fourth in the EuroLeague in assists, with an average of 5.3 per game, and led the league in several other parameters.

On January 4, 2013, Brown scored 41 points in a 98–92 comeback win over Fenerbahçe Ülker. He tied the EuroLeague's single-game scoring record since the 2000–01 season. He was eventually named the EuroLeague MVP of the Month for January. In April 2013, Brown won the EuroLeague Alphonso Ford Trophy, the annual award given to the EuroLeague's "Best Scorer" of the season. He averaged 18.8 points, 5.3 assists, and 1.7 rebounds per game, over a total of 24 games during the 2012–13 season, while shooting .411 from the field. He scored in double figures in 22 games, reached the 20-point mark on 10 occasions, and got to 30 points twice.

=== Dongguan Leopards ===
In the summer of 2013, Brown signed with the Dongguan Leopards of China. On December 27, 2013, he scored 74 points in a 137–135 overtime victory over the Sichuan Blue Whales. Brown had scored the second-highest number of points in a single-game in the Chinese Basketball Association (CBA)'s history, being just one point shy from breaking the record of 75 points scored, that was held by Quincy Douby, and which has since been eclipsed by Errick McCollum's 82 point effort, on January 30, 2015.

On May 22, 2014, Brown extended his contract with Dongguan, for three more years.

=== Beşiktaş Sompo Japan ===
On March 28, 2016, Brown signed with Beşiktaş Sompo Japan of Turkey, for the rest of the Turkish Super League's 2015–16 season.

=== Return to the NBA ===
On September 23, 2016, Brown signed with the Houston Rockets. On December 5, 2016, he was waived by the Rockets after appearing in six games. He re-signed with the Rockets on December 16.

On September 25, 2017, Brown re-signed with the Rockets. On January 5, 2018, he was waived by the Rockets.

=== Olympiacos Piraeus ===
On February 22, 2018, Brown signed with Olympiacos of Greece, for the rest of the Greek Basket League and EuroLeague seasons.

=== Mornar ===
On November 1, 2018, Brown signed a one-year contract with Mornar of the ABA League and the EuroCup. On November 28, Brown parted ways with Mornar.

=== NBA G League Ignite ===
On February 1, 2021, Brown signed with the NBA G League Ignite.

== The Basketball Tournament ==
Brown played for the CitiTeam Blazers in the 2018 edition of The Basketball Tournament (TBT), a single-elimination winner-take-all tournament for a $2 million prize. In two games, he averaged a team-high 20.5 points per game, 3.5 rebounds per game and 3.0 assists per game. CitiTeam Blazers lost in the second to Team Challenge ALS. In TBT 2019, Brown played for four-time defending champion Overseas Elite, who advanced to the semifinals where they suffered their first-ever defeat, losing to Carmen's Crew, 71–66.

== National team career ==
Brown represented the United States national team at the 2015 Pan American Games, where he won a bronze medal.

== Post-playing career ==
On July 31, 2023, Brown was announced as the director of player development for the Cal State Northridge Matadors men's basketball team.

== Career statistics ==
Legend
GP	Games played	GS	Games started	MPG	Minutes per game
FG%	Field-goal percentage	3P%	3-point field-goal percentage	FT%	Free-throw percentage
RPG	Rebounds per game	APG	Assists per game	SPG	Steals per game
BPG	Blocks per game	PPG	Points per game	PIR	Performance index rating
**Bold**	Career high

=== NBA ===
==== Regular season ====
Year	Team	GP	GS	MPG	FG%	3P%	FT%	RPG	APG	SPG	BPG	PPG
2008–09	Sacramento	**47**	**1**	14.4	.381	.330	.765	.8	1.9	.3	.0	5.2
2008–09	Minnesota	21	**1**	12.2	**.416**	.389	.889	.8	1.4	.3	**.1**	5.5
2009–10	New Orleans	22	0	**14.9**	.395	.258	**1.000**	.8	**2.1**	**.4**	.0	**6.6**
2009–10	L.A. Clippers	23	0	8.3	.329	.281	.714	**.9**	1.8	.3	.0	3.0
2016–17	Houston	25	0	4.9	.383	**.400**	**1.000**	.2	.6	.0	.0	2.5
2017–18	Houston	20	0	5.8	.328	.275	.500	.4	.6	.2	.0	2.5
Career		158	2	10.7	.379	.317	.806	.7	1.5	.3	.0	4.4

==== Playoffs ====
Year	Team	GP	GS	MPG	FG%	3P%	FT%	RPG	APG	SPG	BPG	PPG
2017	Houston	5	0	4.4	.500	.455	.000	.4	.2	.0	.0	5.0
Career		5	0	4.4	.500	.455	.000	.4	.2	.0	.0	5.0

=== EuroLeague ===
*	Led the league

Year	Team	GP	GS	MPG	FG%	3P%	FT%	RPG	APG	SPG	BPG	PPG	PIR
2009–10	Gdynia	6	5	26.1	.333	.250	.875	1.0	1.8	**.8**	**.2**	10.7	4.3
2012–13	Mens Sana	**24**	**24**	**32.6***	**.411**	**.344**	**.890**	**1.7**	**5.3**	.5	.1	**18.8***	**17.4***
2017–18	Olympiacos	9	0	10.8	.194	.100	.545	.6	1.1	.1	—	2.2	-0.3
Career		39	29	26.3	.383	.309	.865	1.3	3.8	.4	.1	13.7	11.3

== Personal life ==
Brown shares the same name with the famous American R&B singer. In an interview, he affirmed jokes about his name: "Someone is always trying to be funny...asking me where Whitney's at." Upon announcing his signing with the Kings, ESPN ran the headlines "Their prerogative: Kings agree with Bobby Brown", and "New addition: Sources say Kings agree to deal with Brown", in reference to the singer's 1988 anthem "My Prerogative", and his former boy band New Edition, respectively.
