= 2012–13 Euroleague =

EuroLeague season

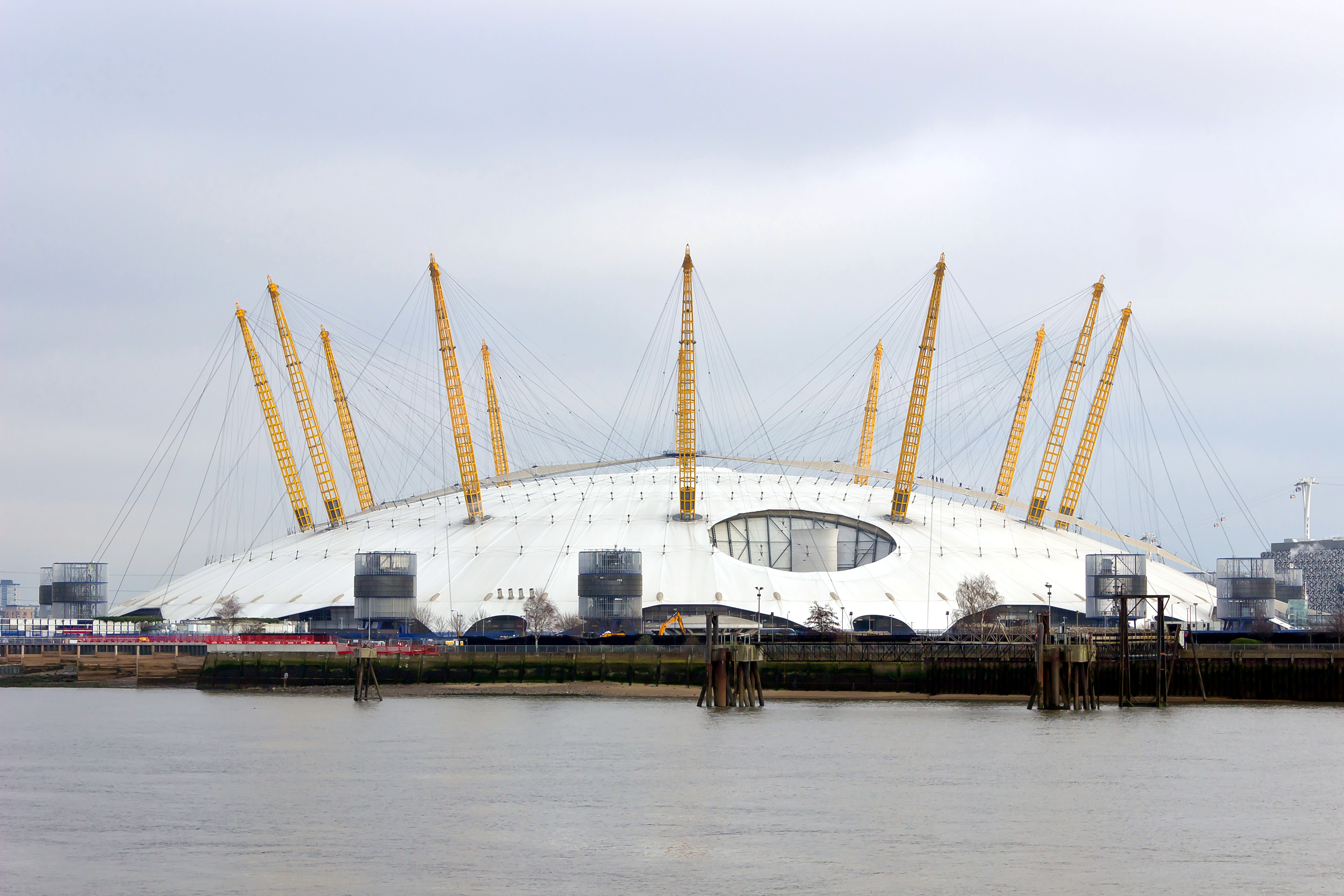
- The O2 Arena in London hosted the Final Four
- Season: 2012–13
- Duration: 11 October 2012 – 12 May 2013
- Teams: 24

Regular season
- Season MVP: (Greece) Vassilis Spanoulis

Finals
- Champions: (Greece) Olympiacos (3rd title)
- Runners-up: (Spain) Real Madrid
- Third place: (Russia) CSKA Moscow
- Fourth place: (Spain) FC Barcelona Regal
- Final Four MVP: (Greece) Vassilis Spanoulis

Awards
- Best Defender: (Gabon) Stéphane Lasme
- Rising Star: (Greece) Kostas Papanikolaou
- Coach of the Year: (Greece) Georgios Bartzokas

Statistical leaders
Points	(United States) Bobby Brown	18.8
Rebounds	(Russia) Victor Khryapa	7.3
Assists	(Croatia) Zoran Planinić	6.3
Index Rating	(United States) Bobby Brown	17.4

The 2012–13 Euroleague was the 13th season of the modern era of Euroleague Basketball and the third under the title sponsorship of Turkish Airlines. Including the competition's previous incarnation as the FIBA Europe Champions Cup, this was the 56th season of the premier competition for European men's clubs. The season started on 11 October 2012 and finished on 12 May 2013.

The Final Four was held at The O2 Arena in London. The championship game was won by Olympiacos, who defeated Real Madrid 100–88. Olympiacos became the third team since the introduction of the Final Four format to win two Euroleague championships in a row and the second team in Euroleague Basketball Company era (2000–01 Euroleague season to present) to become back-to-back Euroleague champions.

== Allocation ==
A total of 31 teams participated in the 2012–13 Euroleague. There were three routes to participation in the Euroleague:

- The top 13 teams with an A-Licence from the 2011–12 Euroleague based on their Euroleague Club Ranking.
- An additional team promoted to an A-Licence.
- The 2011–12 Eurocup winner was given a C-Licence.
- 14 places were allocated from a list of 28 teams given a B-Licence ranked according to their European national basketball league rankings over the last year. 14 teams were given both an A-Licence or C-Licence and a B-Licence. When a country ranking spot had already been assigned to an A-Licence team, the assignation jumped to the next country appearing in the ranking, and their league was not granted an additional place in the competition. The first 8 of the remaining 16 teams were given places in the regular-season, and the next 6 were given places in the qualifying competition. The last 2 places from the Netherlands and Latvia were not taken up.
- As the list of teams with a B-Licence was exhausted, two wild cards were granted to fill the remaining spaces in the qualifying competition.

=== Euroleague allocation criteria ===
On 31 May 2012, the Euroleague published the official License Allocation criteria.

==== A licenses ====
Rank	Team	Pos.	Coefficient
1.	(Spain) FC Barcelona Regal	1st	131
2.	(Greece) Olympiacos	1st	124
3.	(Israel) Maccabi Electra	1st	116
4.	(Greece) Panathinaikos	2nd	114
5.	(Italy) Montepaschi Siena	1st	109
6.	(Spain) Real Madrid	2nd	108
7.	(Russia) CSKA Moscow	1st	104

Rank	Team	Pos.	Coefficient
8.	(Spain) Caja Laboral	3rd	84
9.	(Turkey) Anadolu Efes	2nd	73
10.	(Spain) Unicaja Málaga	9th	73
11.	(Lithuania) Žalgiris	1st	69
12.	(Turkey) Fenerbahçe Ülker	6th	67
13.	(Poland) Asseco Prokom	1st	55
14.	(Italy) Acea Roma	13th	39

- The A license of Acea Roma was cancelled and it was awarded to Italian team EA7 Milano.

==== B licenses ====
Key to colors
A licensed teams
B licensed teams
Teams qualified for the Qualifying Round

	League	Pos.	Team
Teams qualified for the regular season
1.	(Spain) Spanish ACB	1st	FC Barcelona Regal
2.	(Russia) Russian PBL	1st	CSKA Moscow
3.	(Greece) Greek GBL	1st	Olympiacos
4.	(Italy) Italian Serie A	1st	Montepaschi Siena
5.	(Turkey) Turkish TBL	1st	Beşiktaş
6.	(France) French Pro A	1st	Élan Chalon
7.	(Germany) German BBL	1st	Brose Bamberg
8.	(Lithuania) Lithuanian LKL	1st	Žalgiris
9.	(Serbia) Adriatic League	1st^{*}	Partizan
10.	(Croatia) Adriatic League	1st^{*}	Cedevita
11.	(Slovenia) Adriatic League	1st^{*}	Union Olimpija
12.	(Spain) Spanish ACB	2nd	Real Madrid
13.	(Russia) Russian PBL	2nd	Khimki
14.	(Greece) Greek GBL	2nd	Panathinaikos
15.	(Italy) Italian Serie A	2nd	EA7 Milano
16.	(Lithuania) Lithuanian LKL	2nd	Lietuvos Rytas

	League	Pos.	Team
Teams qualified for the qualification rounds
17.	(Turkey) Turkish TBL	2nd	Anadolu Efes
18.	(France) French Pro A	2nd	Le Mans
19.	(Germany) German BBL	2nd	Ratiopharm Ulm
20.	Adriatic League	^{**}	Maccabi Electra
21.	(Belgium) Belgian BLB	1st	Telenet Oostende
22.	(Czech Republic) Czech NBL	1st	ČEZ Nymburk
23.	(Ukraine) Ukrainian SuperLeague	1st	Donetsk
24.	(Israel) Israeli Super League	1st	Maccabi Electra
25.	(Poland) Polish PLK	1st	Asseco Prokom
26.	(Bulgaria) Bulgarian NBL	1st	Lukoil Academic
27.	(Netherlands) Dutch DBL	1st	EiffelTowers Den Bosch^{Withdrew}
28.	(Latvia) Latvian LBL	1st	VEF Rīga^{Withdrew}

* The Adriatic League teams (1 from Serbia, 1 from Slovenia and 1 from Croatia) were the ones with the best Adriatic League + National League + European competitions ranking.
** Next best team from the Adriatic League without B licence.

==== C licenses and wildcards ====
- C license converted in wildcard for the Regular Season (since 2011–12 Eurocup champion BC Khimki qualified via B license):
  - (Germany) Alba Berlin
- Wildcards for the qualification rounds:
  - (Italy) Mapooro Cantù
  - (Russia) UNICS

== Teams ==
On 31 May 2012 the new Euroleague license allocation criteria were announced. Twenty-three teams directly joined the regular season, while one more team joined it from the qualifying rounds. Eight teams fought for the last berth, and Mapooro Cantù got the final spot.

The labels in the parentheses show how each team qualified for the place of its starting round (TH: EuroLeague title holders)

- A - licensed clubs: teams with 3-year licence
- Associated clubs: teams with B and C temporary licenses
- 1st, 2nd, etc.: League position after Playoffs
- EC: Champion of the 2011–12 Eurocup
- WC: Wild card
- Bold: Qualification round winner

Regular season
**A-license**
(Spain) FC Barcelona Regal (1st)	(Greece) Olympiacos (1st)^{TH}	(Turkey) Anadolu Efes (2nd)	(Poland) Asseco Prokom Gdynia (1st)
(Spain) Real Madrid (2nd)	(Greece) Panathinaikos (2nd)	(Turkey) Fenerbahçe Ülker (5th)	(Russia) CSKA Moscow (1st)
(Spain) Caja Laboral (3rd)	(Italy) Montepaschi Siena (1st)	(Israel) Maccabi Electra (1st)	
(Spain) Unicaja (9th)	(Italy) EA7 Milano (2nd)	(Lithuania) Žalgiris (1st)	
**Associated clubs**
(Germany) Brose Baskets (1st)	(France) Élan Chalon (1st)	(Turkey) Beşiktaş (1st)	(Russia) Khimki (2nd)^{(EC)}
(Germany) Alba Berlin (5th)^{(WC)}	(Serbia) Partizan (1st)	(Lithuania) Lietuvos rytas (2nd)	(Slovenia) Union Olimpija (2nd)
(Croatia) Cedevita (2nd)			
Qualifying rounds
(Germany) ratiopharm Ulm (2nd)	(Italy) **Mapooro Cantù** (5th)^{(WC)}	(Bulgaria) Lukoil Academic (1st)	(Russia) UNICS (5th)^{(WC)}
(Belgium) Telenet Oostende (1st)	(France) Le Mans (2nd)	(Czech Republic) ČEZ Nymburk (1st)	(Ukraine) Donetsk (1st)

* The Adriatic League teams (1 from Serbia, 1 from Slovenia and 1 from Croatia) were the ones with the best Adriatic League + National League + European competitions ranking.

- EA7 Milano had a two-year A license, awarded in June 2012.

== Qualifying rounds ==
The qualifying rounds were played in a knock-out tournament consisting of eight teams in a single-venue tournament format. The winner advanced to the Euroleague Regular Season. The qualifying rounds were played between 25 and 28 September at the PalaDesio in Desio, Italy.

First qualifying round 25–26 September
(Russia) UNICS	91
(Germany) ratiopharm Ulm	73
(France) Le Mans	61
(Ukraine) Donetsk	55
(Czech Republic) ČEZ Nymburk	83
(Belgium) Telenet Oostende	65
(Italy) Mapooro Cantù	87
(Bulgaria) Lukoil Academic	79

Second qualifying round 27 September
(Russia) UNICS	78
(France) Le Mans	86
(Czech Republic) ČEZ Nymburk	83
(Italy) Mapooro Cantù	89

Third qualifying round 28 September
(France) Le Mans	66
(Italy) Mapooro Cantù	80

== Draw ==
The draws for the 2012–13 Turkish Airlines Euroleague were held on Friday, 6 July. The draws determined the qualifying-round matchups and regular-season groups for the Euroleague, as well as the qualifying rounds for the Eurocup and the regular-season for the EuroChallenge.

Teams were seeded into six pots of four teams in accordance with the Club Ranking, based on their performance in European competitions during a three-year period.

Two teams from the same country cannot be drawn together in the same Regular Season group.

Pot 1	Pot 2	Pot 3	Pot 4	Pot 5	Pot 6
(Spain) FC Barcelona Regal (Greece) Olympiacos (Israel) Maccabi Electra (Greece) Panathinaikos	(Italy) Montepaschi Siena (Spain) Real Madrid (Russia) CSKA Moscow (Spain) Caja Laboral	(Russia) Khimki (Serbia) Partizan (Germany) Alba Berlin (Turkey) Anadolu Efes	(Spain) Unicaja Málaga (Lithuania) Lietuvos Rytas (Lithuania) Žalgiris (Turkey) Fenerbahçe Ülker	(Poland) Asseco Prokom (Italy) EA7 Milano (Germany) Brose Bamberg (Slovenia) Union Olimpija	(Croatia) Cedevita (Turkey) Beşiktaş (France) Élan Chalon (Italy) Mapooro Cantù (q)

== Regular season ==
The regular season began on 11 October 2012.

If teams were level on record at the end of the Regular Season, tiebreakers were applied in the following order:

1. Head-to-head record.
2. Head-to-head point differential.
3. Point differential during the Regular Season.
4. Points scored during the regular season.
5. Sum of quotients of points scored and points allowed in each Regular Season match.

=== Group A ===
Pos	Team	Pld	W	L	PF	PA	PD	Qualification
1	(Spain) Real Madrid	10	7	3	832	738	+94	Advance to Top 16
2	(Russia) Khimki	10	6	4	753	754	−1	Advance to Top 16
3	(Greece) Panathinaikos	10	6	4	748	722	+26	Advance to Top 16
4	(Turkey) Fenerbahçe Ülker	10	5	5	727	738	−11	Advance to Top 16
5	(Slovenia) Union Olimpija	10	3	7	722	808	−86	
6	(Italy) Mapooro Cantù	10	3	7	708	730	−22	

Source: Euroleague

=== Group B ===
Pos	Team	Pld	W	L	PF	PA	PD	Qualification
1	(Israel) Maccabi Tel Aviv	10	8	2	810	708	+102	Advance to Top 16
2	(Spain) Unicaja	10	8	2	762	715	+47	Advance to Top 16
3	(Italy) Montepaschi Siena	10	5	5	879	844	+35	Advance to Top 16
4	(Germany) Alba Berlin	10	4	6	722	748	−26	Advance to Top 16
5	(France) Élan Chalon	10	3	7	782	843	−61	
6	(Poland) Asseco Prokom Gdynia	10	2	8	704	801	−97	

Source: Euroleague

=== Group C ===
Pos	Team	Pld	W	L	PF	PA	PD	Qualification
1	(Lithuania) Žalgiris	10	8	2	804	693	+111	Advance to Top 16
2	(Greece) Olympiacos	10	8	2	788	737	+51	Advance to Top 16
3	(Turkey) Anadolu Efes	10	5	5	738	740	−2	Advance to Top 16
4	(Spain) Caja Laboral	10	4	6	749	778	−29	Advance to Top 16
5	(Italy) EA7 Milano	10	3	7	760	767	−7	
6	(Croatia) Cedevita	10	2	8	725	849	−124	

Source: Euroleague

=== Group D ===
Pos	Team	Pld	W	L	PF	PA	PD	Qualification
1	(Spain) FC Barcelona Regal	10	9 (Note: Tiebreaker: 1–1 (+18).)	1	774	636	+138	Advance to Top 16
2	(Russia) CSKA Moscow	10	9 (Note: Tiebreaker: 1–1 (−18).)	1	783	709	+74	Advance to Top 16
3	(Turkey) Beşiktaş	10	5	5	699	749	−50	Advance to Top 16
4	(Germany) Brose Baskets	10	3	7	740	807	−67	Advance to Top 16
5	(Lithuania) Lietuvos rytas	10	2 (Note: Tiebreaker: 1–1 (+7).)	8	670	724	−54	
6	(Serbia) Partizan	10	2 (Note: Tiebreaker: 1–1 (−7).)	8	731	772	−41	

Source: Euroleague

== Top 16 ==
The Top 16 began on 27 December 2012.

If teams were level on record at the end of the Top 16, tiebreakers were applied in the following order:

1. Head-to-head record.
2. Head-to-head point differential.
3. Point differential during the Top 16.
4. Points scored during the Top 16.
5. Sum of quotients of points scored and points allowed in each Top 16 match.

=== Group E ===
Pos	Team	Pld	W	L	PF	PA	PD	Qualification
1	(Russia) CSKA Moscow	14	11	3	1095	981	+114	Advance to quarterfinals
2	(Spain) Real Madrid	14	10	4	1085	1021	+64	Advance to quarterfinals
3	(Turkey) Anadolu Efes	14	9 (Note: Tiebreaker: 1–1 (+1).)	5	1028	1031	−3	Advance to quarterfinals
4	(Greece) Panathinaikos	14	9 (Note: Tiebreaker: 1–1 (−1).)	5	1001	968	+33	Advance to quarterfinals
5	(Spain) Unicaja	14	7	7	988	1015	−27	
6	(Lithuania) Žalgiris	14	6	8	1065	1040	+25	
7	(Germany) Alba Berlin	14	4	10	959	1036	−77	
8	(Germany) Brose Baskets	14	0	14	1026	1155	−129	

Source: Euroleague

=== Group F ===
Pos	Team	Pld	W	L	PF	PA	PD	Qualification
1	(Spain) FC Barcelona Regal	14	13	1	1151	986	+165	Advance to quarterfinals
2	(Greece) Olympiacos	14	9	5	1068	1033	+35	Advance to quarterfinals
3	(Israel) Maccabi Tel Aviv	14	8	6	1105	1012	+93	Advance to quarterfinals
4	(Spain) Laboral Kutxa	14	8	6	1093	1045	+48	Advance to quarterfinals
5	(Russia) Khimki	14	7	7	1133	1051	+82	
6	(Italy) Montepaschi Siena	14	7	7	1036	1057	−21	
7	(Turkey) Beşiktaş	14	2	12	893	1104	−211	
8	(Turkey) Fenerbahçe Ülker	14	2	12	1055	1246	−191	

Source: Euroleague

== Quarterfinals ==
Team 1	Agg.	Team 2	1st leg	2nd leg	3rd leg	4th leg	5th leg
CSKA Moscow (Russia)	3–1	(Spain) Laboral Kutxa	89–78	90–68	72–93	94–85	
Olympiacos (Greece)	3–2	(Turkey) Anadolu Efes	67–62	71–53	72–83	73–74	82–72
FC Barcelona Regal (Spain)	3–2	(Greece) Panathinaikos	72–70	65–66	63–65	70–60	64–53
Real Madrid (Spain)	3–0	(Israel) Maccabi Electra	79–53	75–63	69–57		

== Final Four ==
On 12 May 2012 it was announced the Final Four would be hosted at The O2 Arena in London, United Kingdom.

Semifinals; 10 May
(Russia) CSKA Moscow	52
(Greece) Olympiacos	69
(Spain) FC Barcelona Regal	67
(Spain) Real Madrid	74

Final; 12 May
(Greece) Olympiacos	100
(Spain) Real Madrid	88
Third place
(Russia) CSKA Moscow	74
(Spain) FC Barcelona Regal	73

== Top 10 attendances ==
=== Single game ===
	Round	Game	Home team	Visitor	Attendance	Sources
1	Quarter-finals	4	(Greece) Panathinaikos	(Spain) FC Barcelona	20,300	
2	Quarter-finals	3	(Greece) Panathinaikos	(Spain) FC Barcelona	17,800	
2	Top 16	14	(Greece) Panathinaikos	(Russia) CSKA Moscow	17,800	
4	Regular Season	8	(Lithuania) Žalgiris	(Greece) Olympiacos	15,420	
5	Top 16	4	(Lithuania) Žalgiris	(Russia) CSKA Moscow	15,199	
6	Regular Season	7	(Lithuania) Žalgiris	(Spain) Caja Laboral	15,110	
7	Top 16	5	(Spain) Caja Laboral	(Spain) FC Barcelona	15,068	
8	Top 16	10	(Lithuania) Žalgiris	(Spain) Real Madrid	15,010	
9	Regular Season	9	(Greece) Panathinaikos	(Turkey) Fenerbahçe Ülker	15,000	
10	Top 16	5	(Greece) Panathinaikos	(Spain) Real Madrid	14,909	

=== Average ===
Rank	Team	Matches	Average
1	(Lithuania) Žalgiris	12	13,425
2	(Spain) Caja Laboral	14	12,036
3	(Israel) Maccabi Electra	13	10,935
4	(Greece) Panathinaikos	14	10,564
5	(Spain) Real Madrid	14	9,148
6	(Germany) Alba Berlin	12	9,033
7	(Greece) Olympiacos	15	8,265
8	(Turkey) Anadolu Efes	14	8,191
9	(Turkey) Fenerbahçe Ülker	12	7,109
10	(Serbia) Partizan	5	7,100

== Individual statistics ==
=== Rating ===
Rank	Name	Team	Games	Rating	PIR
1.	(United States) Bobby Brown	(Italy) Montepaschi Siena	24	417	17.38
2.	(Russia) Victor Khryapa	(Russia) CSKA Moscow	26	443	17.04
3.	(Serbia) Nenad Krstić	(Russia) CSKA Moscow	29	488	16.83

=== Points ===
Rank	Name	Team	Games	Points	PPG
1.	(United States) Bobby Brown	(Italy) Montepaschi Siena	24	452	18.83
2.	(Slovenia) Boštjan Nachbar	(Germany) Brose Bamberg	23	370	16.09
3.	(Croatia) Bojan Bogdanović	(Turkey) Fenerbahçe Ülker	21	334	15.90

=== Rebounds ===
Rank	Name	Team	Games	Rebounds	RPG
1.	(Russia) Victor Khryapa	(Russia) CSKA Moscow	26	190	7.31
2.	(Croatia) Ante Tomić	(Spain) FC Barcelona	30	195	6.50
3.	(United States) Shawn James	(Israel) Maccabi Electra	27	175	6.48

=== Assists ===
Rank	Name	Team	Games	Assists	APG
1.	(Croatia) Zoran Planinić	(Russia) Khimki	22	139	6.32
2.	(Greece) Dimitris Diamantidis	(Greece) Panathinaikos	27	156	5.78
3.	(Greece) Vassilis Spanoulis	(Greece) Olympiacos	31	170	5.48

=== Other Stats ===
Category	Name	Team	Games	Stat
Steals per game	(North Macedonia) Bo McCalebb	(Turkey) Fenerbahçe Ülker	23	1.91
Blocks per game	(United States) Shawn James	(Israel) Maccabi Electra	27	1.93
Turnovers per game	(Greece) Vassilis Spanoulis	(Greece) Olympiacos	31	3.42
Fouls drawn per game	(Greece) Vassilis Spanoulis	(Greece) Olympiacos	31	5.45
Minutes per game	(United States) Bobby Brown	(Italy) Montepaschi Siena	24	32:37
2FG%	(Russia) Sasha Kaun	(Russia) CSKA Moscow	30	0.716
3FG%	(Greece) Kostas Papanikolaou	(Greece) Olympiacos	31	0.520
FT%	(Brazil) Marcelinho Huertas	(Spain) FC Barcelona	31	0.972

=== Game highs ===
Category	Name	Team	Stat
Rating	(United States) Bobby Brown	(Italy) Montepaschi Siena	50
Points	(United States) Bobby Brown	(Italy) Montepaschi Siena	41
Rebounds	(Austria) Rašid Mahalbašić	(Poland) Asseco Prokom	16
Assists	(Croatia) Zoran Planinić	(Russia) Khimki	13
Steals	7 occasions		5
Blocks	6 occasions		5
Turnovers	(Serbia) Nenad Krstić	(Russia) CSKA Moscow	8
Fouls Drawn	(United States) Bobby Brown	(Italy) Montepaschi Siena	15

== Awards ==
=== 2012–13 Euroleague MVP ===
- (Greece) Vassilis Spanoulis ( (Greece) Olympiacos)

=== 2012–13 Euroleague Final Four MVP ===
- (Greece) Vassilis Spanoulis ( (Greece) Olympiacos)

=== All-Euroleague Team 2012–13 ===
Pos.	All-Euroleague First Team	Club Team	All-Euroleague Second Team	Club Team
G	(Greece) Dimitris Diamantidis	(Greece) Panathinaikos	(Serbia) Miloš Teodosić	(Russia) CSKA Moscow
G	(Greece) Vassilis Spanoulis	(Greece) Olympiacos	(Spain) Juan Carlos Navarro	(Spain) FC Barcelona
F	(Spain) Rudy Fernández	(Spain) Real Madrid	(Russia) Victor Khryapa	(Russia) CSKA Moscow
F	(Serbia) Nenad Krstić	(Russia) CSKA Moscow	(Spain) Nikola Mirotić	(Spain) Real Madrid
C	(Croatia) Ante Tomić	(Spain) FC Barcelona	(United States) Shawn James	(Israel) Maccabi Electra

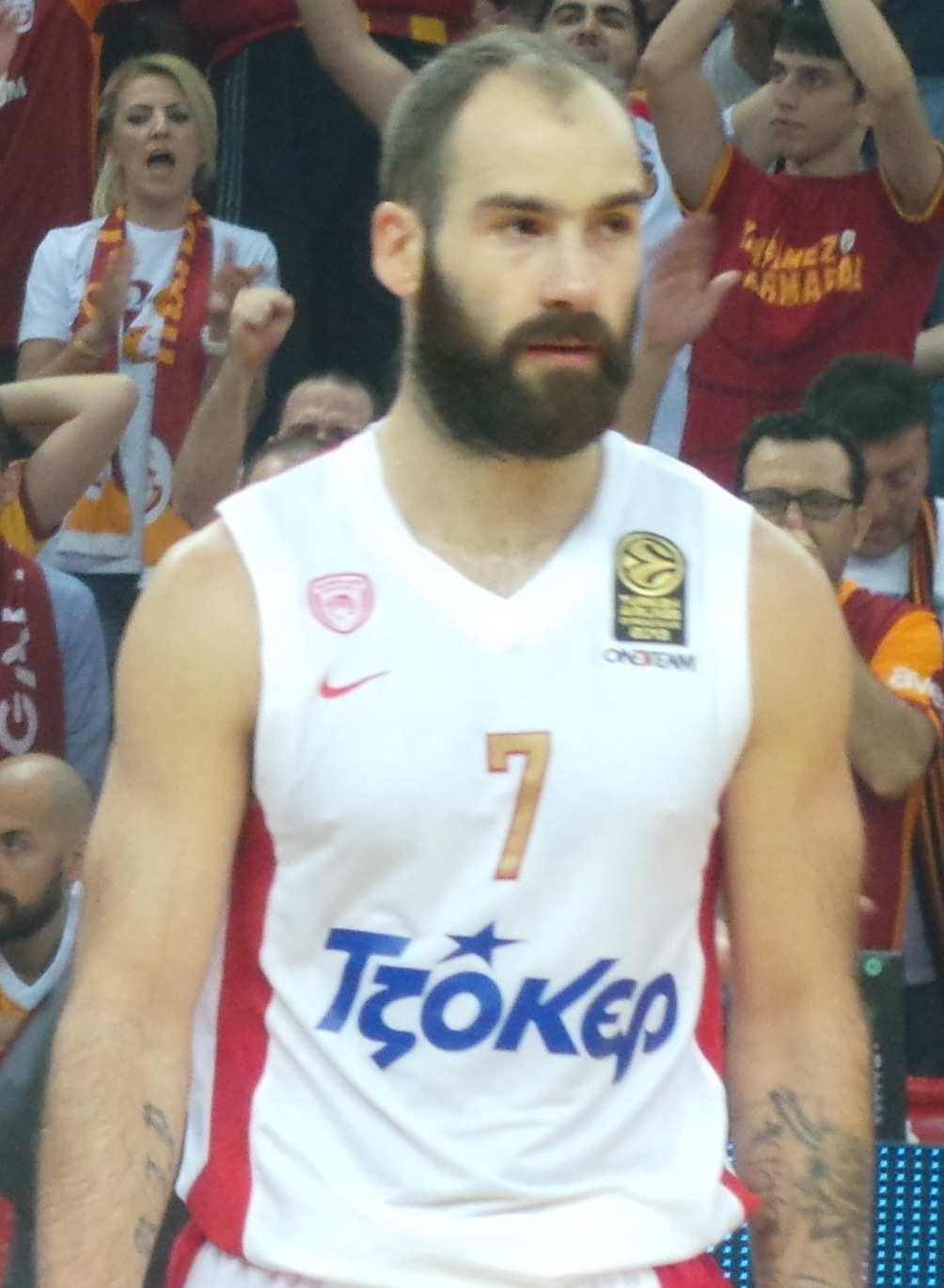
Vassilis Spanoulis, Euroleague MVP and final four MVP for 2013

=== Top Scorer (Alphonso Ford Trophy) ===
- (United States) Bobby Brown ( (Italy) Montepaschi Siena)

=== Best Defender ===
- (Gabon) Stéphane Lasme ( (Greece) Panathinaikos)

=== Rising Star ===
- (Greece) Kostas Papanikolaou ( (Greece) Olympiacos)

=== Coach of the Year (Alexander Gomelsky Award) ===
- (Greece) Georgios Bartzokas ( (Greece) Olympiacos)

=== MVP Weekly ===
==== Regular season ====
Game	Player	Team	PIR
1	(Turkey) Emir Preldžić	(Turkey) Fenerbahçe Ülker	31
2	(United States) Sonny Weems	(Russia) CSKA Moscow	38
3	(Spain) Rudy Fernández	(Spain) Real Madrid	30
3	(Spain) Fernando San Emeterio	(Spain) Caja Laboral	30
4	(United States) Bobby Brown	(Italy) Montepaschi Siena	43
5	(United States) Bobby Brown (2)	(Italy) Montepaschi Siena	31
6	(Slovenia) Sasha Vujačić	(Turkey) Anadolu Efes	31
7	(Spain) Rudy Fernández (2)	(Spain) Real Madrid	28
7	(Croatia) Ante Tomić	(Spain) FC Barcelona Regal	28
8	(Serbia) Miloš Teodosić	(Russia) CSKA Moscow	25
9	(United States) Blake Schilb	(France) Élan Chalon	38
10	(United States) Shawn James	(Israel) Maccabi Electra	27
10	(Serbia) Nemanja Bjelica	(Spain) Caja Laboral	27

==== Top 16 ====
Game	Player	Team	PIR
1	(Croatia) Ante Tomić (2)	(Spain) FC Barcelona	27
2	(United States) Bobby Brown (3)	(Italy) Montepaschi Siena	50
3	(Georgia (country)) Ricky Hickman	(Israel) Maccabi Electra	34
4	(United States) Paul Davis	(Russia) Khimki	29
5	(Croatia) Bojan Bogdanović	(Turkey) Fenerbahçe Ülker	27
5	(United States) Marcus Williams	(Spain) Unicaja	27
6	(Spain) Rudy Fernández (3)	(Spain) Real Madrid	34
7	(Russia) Sasha Kaun	(Russia) CSKA Moscow	30
8	(United States) Devin Smith	(Israel) Maccabi Electra	28
8	(Croatia) Luka Žorić	(Spain) Unicaja	28
8	(Croatia) Roko Ukić	(Greece) Panathinaikos	28
9	(Serbia) Nenad Krstić	(Russia) CSKA Moscow	26
10	(Spain) Nikola Mirotić	(Spain) Real Madrid	37
11	(Croatia) Luka Žorić (2)	(Spain) Unicaja	33
12	(Finland) Petteri Koponen	(Russia) Khimki	35
13	(Australia) Nathan Jawai	(Spain) FC Barcelona	34
14	(Greece) Kostas Papanikolaou	(Greece) Olympiacos	37

==== Quarter-finals ====
Game	Player	Team	PIR
1	(Spain) Rudy Fernández (4)	(Spain) Real Madrid	22
2	(Russia) Victor Khryapa	(Russia) CSKA Moscow	25
3	(United States) Jamon Gordon	(Turkey) Anadolu Efes	24
4	(Russia) Victor Khryapa (2)	(Russia) CSKA Moscow	29
5	(Australia) Nathan Jawai (2)	(Spain) FC Barcelona	21

=== MVP of the Month ===
Month	Player	Team
October 2012	(United States) Sonny Weems	(Russia) CSKA Moscow
November 2012	(Greece) Vassilis Spanoulis	(Greece) Olympiacos
December 2012	(Poland) Maciej Lampe	(Spain) Caja Laboral
January 2013	(United States) Bobby Brown	(Italy) Montepaschi Siena
February 2013	(Croatia) Ante Tomić	(Spain) FC Barcelona
March 2013	(United States) Devin Smith	(Israel) Maccabi Electra
April 2013	(Spain) Sergio Llull	(Spain) Real Madrid

== See also ==
- 2012–13 Eurocup Basketball
- 2012–13 FIBA EuroChallenge
