= PalaDesio =

Arena in Desio, Lombardy, Italy

- PalaFitlineDesio
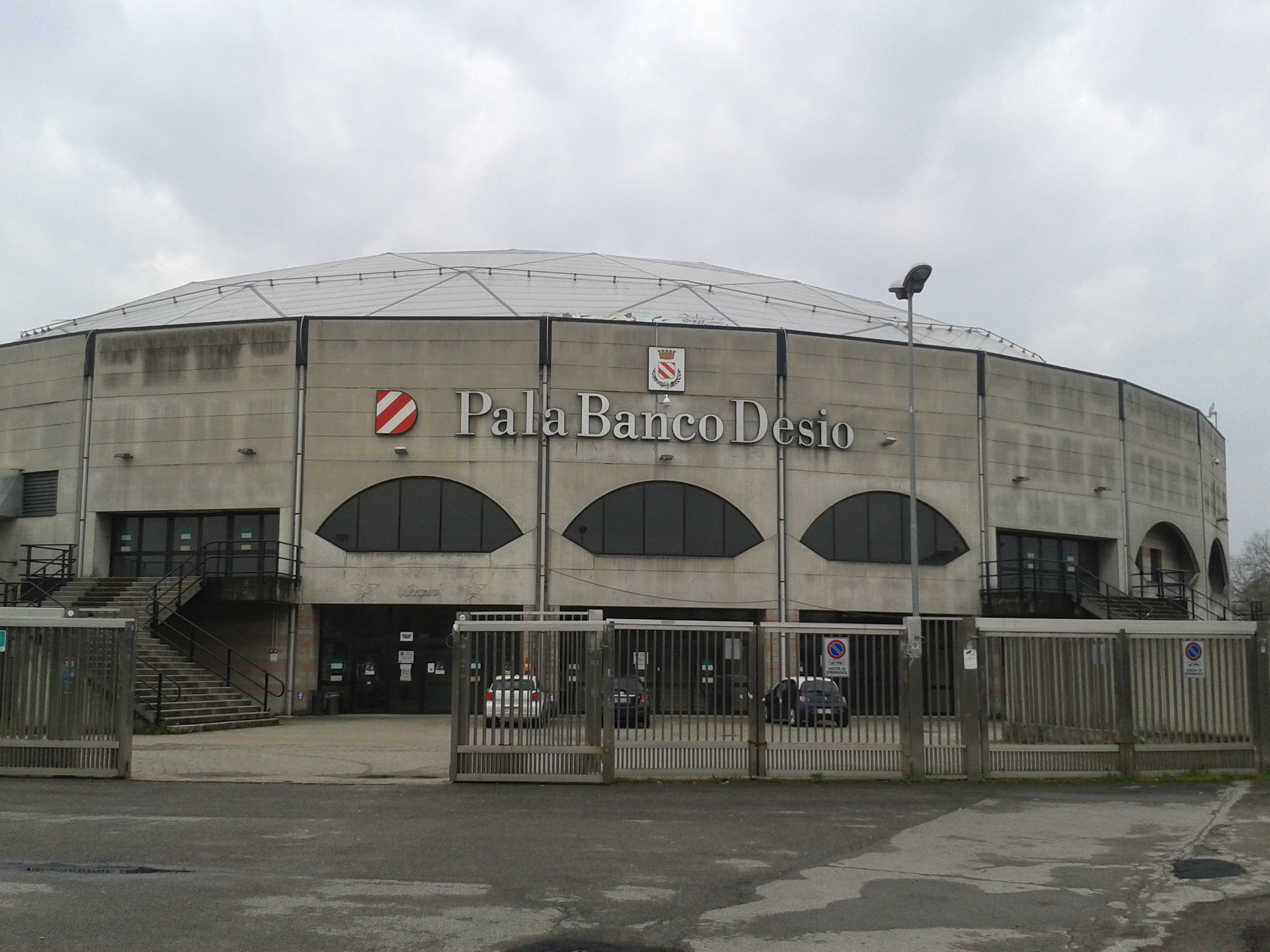
- Interactive map of PalaDesio
- Address: Largo Atleti Azzurri d’Italia
- Location: Desio, Lombardy, Italy
- Coordinates: 45.6132532°N 9.1931051°E
- Owner: Desio comune
- Capacity: 6,700 (basic); 8,000 (extended)
- Type: Arena
- Event: Multi-purpose
- Surface: Parquet
- Scoreboard: Yes
- Field size: 20,000 square metres (220,000 sq ft)

Construction
- Opened: 12 March 1992
- Renovated: 2011
- Cost: 6 million lire €130,000 (renovation)
- Architect: Clemente Schiatti

Tenants
- San Giorgio ‘79 (200?-present); Italian rhythmic gymnastics team (2003-present); Pallacanestro Cantù (2011-present, periodically); Olimpia Milano (2011-present, periodically Power Volley Milano (2014-2015)

The PalaDesio (full name: Palazzetto dello Sport di Desio, known for sponsorship reasons as PalaFitlineDesio) is an arena located in Desio, Lombardy, Italy. Opened in 1992, the arena – with a capacity of 6,700 or 8,000 depending on the layout – has hosted a number of sporting and artistic events, chief of which have been basketball and gymnastics.

== History ==
The construction of the PalaDesio took eighteen months and the arena was completed on 12 March 1992 for a cost of around 6 million lire. It was built to host Aurora Desio, a basketball club that played in the second division Serie A2 (having also played in the first division priorly). The club would only play two seasons at the Banco Desio-sponsored arena, disappearing after the 1993–94 season (where it won the Serie A2) after selling its sporting rights.

Aurora's demise would open a vacuum that the Desio municipality struggled to fill, women's basketball and volleyball clubs Feg Robbiano and Preca Moda Cislago played there, whilst guests such as the Harlem Globetrotters or a number of artists (Vasco Rossi, Litfiba, Ligabue, De Gregori, Beppe Grillo, the Italian cast of the Les Dix Commandements) periodically visited but despite this and the presence of gymnastics organisations (see gymnastics) the venue remained unprofitable. Faced with upkeep costs of between €120,000 and €250,000 per year, the municipality tried to involve private event-managing companies without avail, an attempt to sell the arena in 2003 did not go through either.

Another basketball club, neighbours Pallacanestro Cantù, used the arena to play in the 2011–12 Euroleague as the Palasport Pianella where they usually played did not meet Euroleague standards. It underwent a €130,000 refurbishment over the 2011 summer, with changes to the court, electrical installations and outside area that made it fall in line with the aforementioned standards. The PalaDesio hosted the Euroleague 2012–13 qualifying rounds, before again seeing Cantù play their Euroleague games there after they emerged victorious. They have also played domestic Serie A games in Desio, including one game during the 2010-11 season, four more the next, then two local derbies against Vanoli Cremona and EA7 Emporio Armani Milano in 2014-15.

Milano themselves have played a handful of games at the arena when their Mediolanum Forum proved unavailable, with two league games in 2011-12 season, three the next season (of which a Euroleague game) and two 2014–15 Euroleague games.

It hosted the games of Power Volley Milano (in Italian) for the 2014–15 season, after which the club moved to Castellanza's PalaBorsani.

In January 2015, Banco Desio - who had rescinded their naming sponsorship about twenty years earlier - signed a new sponsorship agreement with the municipality that saw the arena re-become the PalaBancoDesio.

The newly minted PalaBancoDesio played host to the 2015 Italian Basketball Cup between the 20th and 22 February.

=== Gymnastics ===
The arena started hosting rhythmic gymnastics club San Giorgio ‘79 in the early 2000s, with the Italian national rhythmic gymnastics team (in Italian) also making it their base from 2003. The relationship between San Giorgio - who had taken over the management (though not the costs) of the arena - and the municipality after the latter decided to launch a tender in September 2012 to find a new managing entity. San Giorgio accused the local authorities of trying to force them out, which was denied by the town's mayor and head of sports who claimed they wanted to keep them in place but that an arena of that size was unsuited for their sole use. The dispute, which partly stemmed from the organisation of basketball games in the venue, seemingly resolved itself when a new gym was projected to be built over 180 days from November 2013 to house all the gymnasts, thanks to funding from the Italian National Olympic Committee.

It was the venue of the 2014 finals of the Italian artistic gymnastics championships (the first and second divisions of both the women and men's tournaments). The event, organised by neighbouring club Pro Carate Brianza, saw the national attendance record of the sport beaten with 5,700 tickets sold. Besides, it regularly hosts international rhythmic gymnastics meetings to prepare the national team, who train every day in Desio, for competitions.

== Features ==
The total dimension of the circular arena is 20,000 m^{2} (215,278 sq ft). It is 25 metres (82 ft) high and under a dome with a diameter of 78 metres (256 ft). The arena has a basic capacity of 6,700 seats, which can be expanded to 8,000 if part of the court (around the playing court) is also used. It consists of three layers, the court-side (with two sets of bleachers, player's benches and VIP seats), first ring and second.

The arena was seen as well-built, so much that the neighbouring municipality of Monza asked - and obtained free of charge - for the building plans so that they copy them for their own arena.

== See also ==
- List of indoor arenas in Italy
