= 2012–13 Euroleague qualifying rounds =

The 2012–13 Euroleague qualifying rounds were the qualifying rounds for the 2012–13 Euroleague. Eight teams was participating in a single-venue tournament format. The winner, Mapooro Cantù, advanced to the Euroleague Regular Season. The qualifying round was played between September 25 and 28 at the PalaDesio in Desio, Italy.

== Teams ==
- (Belgium) Telenet Oostende ^{B} (1)
- (Bulgaria) Lukoil Academic ^{B} (1)
- (Czech Republic) ČEZ Nymburk ^{B} (1)
- (France) Le Mans ^{B} (2)
- (Germany) ratiopharm Ulm ^{B} (2)
- (Italy) Mapooro Cantù (host) ^{WC} (3)
- (Russia) UNICS ^{WC} (5)
- (Ukraine) Donetsk ^{B} (1)

== Bracket ==
First qualifying round 25–26 September
(Russia) UNICS	91
(Germany) ratiopharm Ulm	73
(France) Le Mans	61
(Ukraine) Donetsk	55
(Czech Republic) ČEZ Nymburk	83
(Belgium) Telenet Oostende	65
(Italy) Mapooro Cantù	87
(Bulgaria) Lukoil Academic	79

Second qualifying round 27 September
(Russia) UNICS	78
(France) Le Mans	86
(Czech Republic) ČEZ Nymburk	83
(Italy) Mapooro Cantù	89

Third qualifying round 28 September
(France) Le Mans	66
(Italy) Mapooro Cantù	80

== First qualifying round ==
September 25, 2012	ČEZ Nymburk (Czech Republic)	83–65	(Belgium) Telenet Oostende	PalaDesio, Desio
18:00	Scoring by quarter: 22–22, 22–21, 24–19, 15–3
	Pts: Abrams 15; Rebs: Houška 11; Asts: Abrams, Taylor, Pavković 3	Report	Pts: Lojeski 16; Rebs: Wright 9 Asts: Stojić 5	Attendance: 600; Referees: Juan Carlos Arteaga (ESP), Srdan Dožai (CRO), Spiros Gkontas (GRE)

September 25, 2012	Mapooro Cantù (Italy)	87–79	(Bulgaria) Lukoil Academic	PalaDesio, Desio
20:45	Scoring by quarter: 26–25, 22–22, 16–13, 23–19
	Pts: Tyus 18; Rebs: Leunen 8 Asts: Smith 5	Report	Pts: Heath 21; Rebs: Watkins 15; Asts: Heath 5	Attendance: 3,022; Referees: Ilija Belošević (SRB), Daniel Hierrezuelo (ESP), Elias Koromilas (GRE)

September 26, 2012	UNICS (Russia)	91–73	(Germany) ratiopharm Ulm	PalaDesio, Desio
18:00	Scoring by quarter: 24-14, 13-18, 35-20, 19-21
	Pts: Lyday 21; Rebs: Veremeenko 9 Asts: Samoylenko 5	Report	Pts: Ray, Bryant 17; Rebs: Watts 8 Asts: Esterkamp 2	Attendance: 300; Referees: Juan Carlos Arteaga (ESP), Spiros Gkontas (GRE), Damir Javor (SLO)

September 26, 2012	Le Mans (France)	61–55	(Ukraine) Donetsk	PalaDesio, Desio
20:45	Scoring by quarter: 13-19, 22-12, 13-16, 13-8
	Pts: Long 14; Rebs: Kahudi 8 Asts: El-Amin 5	Report	Pts: Perkins 15; Rebs: Perkins 10; Asts: Ivanov 3	Attendance: 300; Referees: Srdan Dožai (CRO), Daniel Hierrezuelo (ESP), Marcin Kowalski (POL)

== Second qualifying round ==
September 27, 2012	Mapooro Cantù (Italy)	89–83	(Czech Republic) ČEZ Nymburk	PalaDesio, Desio
18:00	Scoring by quarter: 23–17, 20–27, 25–13, 21–26
	Pts: Aradori 19; Rebs: Tyus 6 Asts: Smith 5	Report	Pts: Abrams, Taylor 16; Rebs: Tapoutos 6 Asts: Taylor 5	Attendance: 3,000; Referees: Ilija Belošević (SRB), Srdan Dožai (CRO), Elias Koromilas (GRE)

September 27, 2012	UNICS (Russia)	78–86	(France) Le Mans	PalaDesio, Desio
20:45	Scoring by quarter: 20-22, 18-20, 23-16, 17-28
	Pts: Kaimakoglou 20; Rebs: Eidson, Kaimakoglou 8 Asts: Samoylenko 5	Report	Pts: Batista 20; Rebs: Batista 10; Asts: Khalid El-Amin 4	Attendance: 2,298; Referees: Daniel Hierrezuelo (ESP), Spiros Gkontas (GRE), Damir Javor (SLO)

== Third qualifying round ==
September 28, 2012	Mapooro Cantù (Italy)	80–66	(France) Le Mans	PalaDesio, Desio
20:30	Scoring by quarter: 23-12, 21-16, 21-16, 15-22
	Pts: Leunen 15; Rebs: Leunen 5 Asts: Aradori 4	Report	Pts: Batista 15; Rebs: Sy 7 Asts: Long 3	Attendance: 4,250; Referees: Juan Carlos Arteaga (ESP), Ilija Belošević (SRB), Marcin Kowalski (POL)
