= 2011–12 Lega Basket Serie A =

Lega Basket Serie A
- Season: 2011–12
- Dates: 9 October 2011 – 6 May 2012
- Teams: 17

Regular season
- Season MVP: (North Macedonia) Bo McCalebb
- Relegated: Novipiù Casale Monferrato

Finals
- Champions: ~~Montepaschi Siena~~
- Runners-up: EA7 Emporio Armani Milano
- Finals MVP: (North Macedonia) Bo McCalebb

Statistical leaders
Points	(United States) Andre Smith	18.4
Rebounds	(Georgia (country)) Viktor Sanikidze	11.0
Assists	(North Macedonia) Marques Green	6.5

The 2011–12 Lega Basket Serie A was the 90th season of the Lega Basket Serie A, the top level basketball league in Italy. The season started on 9 October 2011 and ended on 6 May 2012. Montepaschi Siena initially won the national title. However, in 2016 their championship was revoked after investigations showed financial and fiscal fraud.

== Teams ==
- Angelico Biella
- Banca Tercas Teramo
- Banco di Sardegna Sassari
- Benetton Treviso
- Bennet Cantù
- Canadian Solar Bologna
- Cimberio Varese
- EA7 Emporio Armani Milano
- Fabi Shoes Montegranaro
- Montepaschi Siena
- Novipiù Casale Monferrato
- Pepsi Caserta
- Scavolini Siviglia Pesaro
- Sidigas Avellino
- Umana Venezia
- Vanoli-Braga Cremona
- Virtus Roma
Lega Basket 2011–12 – Club Locations

== Regular season ==
=== Standings ===
	Team	Pts	Pld	W	L	PF	PA	Qualification
1	Montepaschi Siena	56	32	24	8	2639	2308	Qualified for the Playoffs
2	EA7 Emporio Armani Milano	54	32	22	10	2532	2359	Qualified for the Playoffs
3	Bennet Cantù	53	32	21	11	2383	2237	Qualified for the Playoffs
4	Banco di Sardegna Sassari	52	32	20	12	2581	2494	Qualified for the Playoffs
5	Canadian Solar Bologna	52	32	20	12	2414	2378	Qualified for the Playoffs
6	Scavolini Siviglia Pesaro	51	32	19	13	2419	2401	Qualified for the Playoffs
7	Umana Venezia	49	32	17	15	2475	2436	Qualified for the Playoffs
8	Cimberio Varese	49	32	17	15	2429	2385	Qualified for the Playoffs
9	Sidigas Avellino	47	32	15	17	2480	2606	
10	Vanoli-Braga Cremona	46	32	14	18	2349	2462	
11	Benetton Treviso	45	32	13	19	2403	2493	
12	Angelico Biella	45	32	13	19	2454	2503	
13	Acea Roma	45	32	13	19	2519	2603	
14	Banca Tercas Teramo	44	32	12	20	2373	2488	
15	Fabi Shoes Montegranaro	44	32	12	20	2482	2588	
16	Otto Caserta	44	32	12	20	2479	2576	
17	Novipiù Casale Monferrato	40	32	8	24	2353	2447	Relegation

== Playoffs ==
Quarterfinals
1	Montepaschi Siena	3
8	Cimberio Varese	1
4	Banco di Sardegna Sassari	3
5	Canadian Solar Bologna	0
2	EA7 Emporio Armani Milano	3
7	Umana Venezia	1
3	Bennet Cantù	2
6	Scavolini Siviglia Pesaro	3

Semifinals
1	Montepaschi Siena	3
4	Banco di Sardegna Sassari	0
2	EA7 Emporio Armani Milano	3
6	Scavolini Siviglia Pesaro	1

Final
1	Montepaschi Siena	4
2	EA7 Emporio Armani Milano	1
