= 2018–19 Olimpia Milano season =

Olimpia Milano
2018-19 season
- Owner: Giorgio Armani
- President: Livio Proli
- Head coach: Simone Pianigiani
- Arena: Mediolanum Forum
- LBA: 1st
- Playoffs: Semifinals
- EuroLeague: 12th
- Coppa Italia: Quarterfinals
- PIR leader: (Lithuania) Artūras Gudaitis 19.1
- Scoring leader: (United States) Mike James 17.8
- Rebounding leader: (Lithuania) Artūras Gudaitis 7.5
- Assists leader: (United States) Mike James 5.7
- Highest home attendance: 12,005; Milano 72–67 Varese (December 23, 2018)
- Lowest home attendance: 6611; Milano 83–95 Panathinaikos (March 22, 2019)
- Average home attendance: 8177
- Biggest win: Milano 111-74 Pesaro (February 10, 2019)
- Biggest defeat: Milano 79-93 Sassari (July 4, 2019)
Serie A	Euroleague

== Team ==
=== Final roster ===
Olimpia Milano roster
Players
Coaches

Pos.	No.	Nat.	Name	Ht.	Wt.	Age
SG	00	(Italy)	Della Valle, Amedeo	1.94 m (6 ft 4 in)	86 kg (190 lb)	31 – 11 April 1993
PG	2	(United States)	James, Mike	1.85 m (6 ft 1 in)	88 kg (194 lb)	34 – 18 August 1990
SF	5	(Serbia)	Micov, Vladimir	2.01 m (6 ft 7 in)	101 kg (223 lb)	39 – 16 April 1985
C	7	(Lithuania)	Gudaitis, Artūras	2.08 m (6 ft 10 in)	115 kg (254 lb)	31 – 19 June 1993
SF	13	(Italy)	Fontecchio, Simone	2.03 m (6 ft 8 in)	91 kg (201 lb)	29 – 9 December 1995
C	15	(United States)	Tarczewski, Kaleb	2.13 m (7 ft 0 in)	111 kg (245 lb)	32 – 26 February 1993
SG	16	(Serbia)	Nedović, Nemanja	1.91 m (6 ft 3 in)	87 kg (192 lb)	33 – 16 June 1991
PF	19	(Lithuania)	Kuzminskas, Mindaugas	2.06 m (6 ft 9 in)	98 kg (216 lb)	35 – 19 October 1989
PG	20	(Italy)	Cinciarini, Andrea (C)	1.93 m (6 ft 4 in)	84 kg (185 lb)	38 – 21 June 1986
SF	21	(United States)	Nunnally, James	2.01 m (6 ft 7 in)	93 kg (205 lb)	34 – 14 July 1990
C	23	(Italy)	Burns, Christian	2.03 m (6 ft 8 in)	108 kg (238 lb)	39 – 4 September 1985
PF	32	(Italy)	Brooks, Jeff	2.03 m (6 ft 8 in)	98 kg (216 lb)	35 – 12 June 1989
PG	55	(United States)	Jerrells, Curtis	1.85 m (6 ft 1 in)	88 kg (194 lb)	38 – 5 February 1987
C	92	(Slovenia)	Omić, Alen	2.16 m (7 ft 1 in)	109 kg (240 lb)	32 – 6 May 1992

Head coach

- (Italy) Simone Pianigiani

Assistant coach(es)

- (Italy) Massimo Cancellieri
- (Italy) Mario Fioretti
- (Italy) Marco Esposito
- (Italy) Andrea Turchetto

Legend

- (C) Team captain
- Injured

- Roster
Updated: July 14, 2019

Note: Flags indicate national team eligibility at FIBA-sanctioned events. Players may hold other non-FIBA nationalities not displayed.

=== Depth chart ===
Pos.	Starting 5	Bench 1	Bench 2	Bench 3
C	Artūras Gudaitis	Kaleb Tarczewski	Christian Burns	Alen Omić
PF	Jeff Brooks	Mindaugas Kuzminskas
SF	Vladimir Micov	James Nunnally	Simone Fontecchio
SG	Nemanja Nedović	Amedeo Della Valle
PG	Mike James	Curtis Jerrells	Andrea Cinciarini

=== Squad changes ===
==== Extensions ====
No.	Pos.	Nat.	Name	Type	Ends	Date	Source
45	G/F	(Latvia)	Dairis Bertāns	1 year	June 2019	29 June 2018	
15	C	(United States)	Kaleb Tarczewski	2 years	June 2020	30 June 2018	

==== In ====
No.	Pos.	Nat.	Name	Moving from		Type	Date	Source
22	SG	(Italy)	Amedeo Della Valle	Reggio Emilia	(Italy)	3 years	22 June 2018	
32	PF	(Italy)	Jeff Brooks	Unicaja Malaga	(Spain)	2 years	25 June 2018	
16	SG	(Serbia)	Nemanja Nedovic	Unicaja Malaga	(Spain)	2 years	26 June 2018	
23	F/C	(Italy)	Christian Burns	Pallacanestro Cantù	(Italy)	2 years	28 June 2018	
2	PG	(United States)	Mike James	Panathinaikos	(Greece)	3+1 years	13 July 2018	
13	SF	(Italy)	Simone Fontecchio	Vanoli Cremona	(Italy)	return from loan	14 July 2018	
92	C	(Slovenia)	Alen Omić	Budućnost	(Montenegro)	end of the season	2 January 2019	
21	G/F	(United States)	James Nunnally	Houston Rockets	(United States)	2 years	27 January 2019	

==== Out ====
No.	Pos.	Nat.	Name	Moving to		Type	Date	Source
0	SG	(United States)	Andrew Goudelock	Shandong Heroes	(China)	end of contract	30 June 2018	
7	PF	(Italy)	Davide Pascolo	Aquila Basket Trento	(Italy)	end of contract	30 June 2018	
9	PG	(Lithuania)	Mantas Kalnietis	ASVEL Basket	(France)	end of contract	30 June 2018	
22	C	(Italy)	Marco Cusin	Auxilium Torino	(Italy)	end of contract	30 June 2018	
23	SG	(Italy)	Awudu Abass	Basket Brescia Leonessa	(Italy)	end of contract	30 June 2018	
24	PF	(France)	Amath M'Baye	Virtus Bologna	(Italy)	end of contract	30 June 2018	
25	PG	(North Macedonia)	Jordan Theodore	AEK Athens	(Greece)	end of contract	30 June 2018	
45	G/F	(Latvia)	Dairis Bertāns	New Orleans Pelicans	(United States)	mutual consent	1 March 2019	

== Club uniform ==
Lega Basket home	Lega Basket away	Euroleague home	Euroleague away

== Competitions ==
Competition	First match	Last match	Starting round	Final position	Record							
Competition	First match	Last match	Starting round	Final position	Pld	W	D	L	PF	PA	PD	Win %
Supercup	29 September 2018	30 September 2018	Semifinals	Winner	2	2	0	0	163	130	+33	100.00
Serie A	7 October 2018	2 June 2019	Regular season	Semifinals	41	26	0	15	3,275	3,065	+210	63.41
EuroLeague	12 October 2018	4 April 2019	Regular season	12th	30	14	0	16	2,601	2,600	+1	46.67
Italian Cup	14 February 2018	14 February 2018	Quarter-finals	Quarter-finals	1	0	0	1	84	86	−2	0.00
Total					74	42	0	32	6,123	5,881	+242	56.76

Source: Competitions

== Statistics ==
=== Individual statistics Serie A ===
No.	Player	GC	GP	GS	MPG	2FG%	3FG%	FT%	RPG	APG	SPG	BPG	EF	PPG
00	Amedeo Della Valle	36	29	11	16.8	46.4%	36.4%	91.2%	1.5	1.3	0.7	0.2	7.1	7.4
2	Mike James	28	27	24	25.6	45.9%	34.3%	77.7%	3.4	5.0	1.3	0.1	16.1	15.6
5	Vladimir Micov	32	32	24	27.1	49.0%	37.4%	82.1%	2.7	2.0	0.8	0.1	8.7	9.7
7	Artūras Gudaitis	9	9	6	21.8	63.0%	-	70.7%	8.2	0.9	0.9	0.9	20.1	14.8
13	Simone Fontecchio	38	34	11	12.0	47.0%	37.5%	85.7%	1.1	0.3	0.3	0.2	2.1	4.0
15	Kaleb Tarczewski	27	27	23	22.5	78.3%	-	61.0%	7.1	0.7	0.3	0.7	15.6	10.7
16	Nemanja Nedović	17	17	4	20.2	42.3%	41.0%	69.4%	2.6	2.7	1.0	0.1	10.5	11.3
19	Mindaugas Kuzminskas	34	33	5	17.9	60.5%	34.2%	81.8%	3.3	0.7	0.4	0.2	10.3	9.2
20	Andrea Cinciarini	36	34	10	18.9	45.3%	41.1%	70.8%	3.0	2.9	0.7	0.0	8.5	6.5
21	James Nunnally	19	18	17	28.1	50.6%	45.1%	95.7%	2.4	2.9	0.5	0.0	14.0	15.1
23	Christian Burns	38	36	5	13.5	63.0%	26.3%	66.7%	3.4	0.3	0.7	0.3	5.6	4.7
32	Jeff Brooks	37	35	32	22.5	54.3%	33.3%	78.7%	4.5	1.0	0.7	0.5	8.2	5.9
45	Dairis Bertāns	17	16	2	11.4	35.0%	48.7%	69.0%	0.9	0.3	0.4	0.0	4.3	5.7
55	Curtis Jerrells	28	27	7	21.9	53.1%	37.5%	83.7%	2.3	2.0	0.7	0.1	9.3	10.4
92	Alen Omić	15	11	4	11.5	56.0%	0.0%	66.7%	3.4	0.5	0.1	0.2	4.5	3.1
Total		38				54.4%	37.8%	76.6%	35.6	15.9	6.4	2.3	95.4	86.2

=== Individual statistics Euroleague ===
No.	Player	GC	GP	GS	MPG	2FG%	3FG%	FT%	RPG	APG	SPG	BPG	EF	PPG
00	Amedeo Della Valle	25	12	0	6.1	50.0%	35.7%	100.0%	0.8	0.3	0.1	0.2	1.8	2.1
2	Mike James	30	30	30	33.9	47.0%	32.6%	82.6%	3.8	6.4	1.3	0.0	20.2	19.8
5	Vladimir Micov	30	30	30	31.3	50.3%	39.4%	79.0%	3.2	2.5	1.1	0.1	13.7	13.9
7	Artūras Gudaitis	21	21	4	23.8	63.9%	-	80.5%	7.1	0.4	0.8	1.0	18.7	12.5
13	Simone Fontecchio	14	5	0	0.8	-	0.0%	-	0.0	0.0	0.0	0.0	-1.2	0.0
15	Kaleb Tarczewski	24	24	24	18.2	72.4%	-	69.2%	4.6	0.4	0.4	0.7	8.8	6.4
16	Nemanja Nedović	16	15	7	23.5	51.7%	41.4%	80.6%	2.5	2.7	0.8	0.1	10.4	11.5
19	Mindaugas Kuzminskas	30	30	1	17.1	51.4%	46.9%	85.9%	3.3	0.7	0.5	0.1	8.8	8.5
20	Andrea Cinciarini	28	14	5	11.2	62.5%	33.3%	37.5%	1.4	0.9	0.5	0.1	2.4	3.2
21	James Nunnally	10	10	7	26.9	52.6%	42.1%	91.7%	2.9	2.2	0.4	0.0	14.5	14.1
23	Christian Burns	29	14	0	3.1	44.4%	0.0%	100.0%	0.8	0.1	0.0	0.1	0.6	1.0
32	Jeff Brooks	29	29	29	25.1	55.7%	39.6%	83.3%	5.3	1.0	0.8	0.3	8.6	6.0
45	Dairis Bertāns	23	22	11	16.6	32.0%	53.6%	82.4%	1.0	0.6	0.7	0.0	5.1	6.4
55	Curtis Jerrells	30	30	0	15.1	45.5%	34.3%	75.0%	1.0	1.5	0.4	0.0	4.2	6.2
92	Alen Omić	15	14	2	12.5	45.9%	0.0%	16.7%	3.6	0.5	0.4	0.2	4.1	2.5
Total		30				52.8%	38.7%	80.5%	34.0	15.9	6.4	2.2	95.4	87.3

=== Season individual statistics ===
No.	Player	GC	GP	GS	MPG	2FG%	3FG%	FT%	RPG	APG	SPG	BPG	EF	PPG
00	Amedeo Della Valle	61	41	11	13.7	46.7%	36.3%	91.8%	1.3	1.0	0.5	0.2	5.5	5.8
2	Mike James	58	57	54	30.0	46.6%	33.3%	80.8%	3.6	5.7	1.3	0.1	18.3	17.8
5	Vladimir Micov	62	62	54	29.1	49.7%	38.5%	80.0%	3.0	2.3	1.0	0.1	11.1	11.7
7	Artūras Gudaitis	30	30	10	23.2	63.6%	-	77.5%	7.5	0.5	0.8	1.0	19.1	13.2
13	Simone Fontecchio	52	39	11	10.5	47.0%	36.2%	85.7%	1.0	0.2	0.3	0.2	1.6	3.5
15	Kaleb Tarczewski	51	51	47	20.5	76.2%	-	63.6%	5.9	0.5	0.4	0.7	12.4	8.6
16	Nemanja Nedović	33	32	11	21.8	47.3%	41.2%	74.6%	2.6	2.7	0.9	0.1	10.5	11.4
19	Mindaugas Kuzminskas	64	63	6	17.5	56.3%	39.9%	83.6%	3.3	0.7	0.4	0.2	9.6	8.9
20	Andrea Cinciarini	64	48	15	16.6	48.2%	39.7%	67.1%	2.5	2.3	0.6	0.0	6.7	5.5
21	James Nunnally	29	28	24	27.6	51.4%	44.3%	94.0%	2.6	2.6	0.5	0.0	14.2	14.7
23	Christian Burns	67	50	5	10.6	61.5%	25.0%	70.8%	2.6	0.3	0.5	0.2	4.2	3.7
32	Jeff Brooks	66	64	61	23.7	54.9%	36.6%	80.3%	4.8	1.0	0.7	0.4	8.4	6.0
45	Dairis Bertāns	40	38	13	14.4	33.3%	51.9%	73.9%	0.9	0.5	0.6	0.0	4.8	6.1
55	Curtis Jerrells	58	57	7	18.3	49.7%	36.1%	80.5%	1.6	1.7	0.5	0.1	6.6	8.2
92	Alen Omić	30	25	6	12.1	50.0%	0.0%	46.7%	3.5	0.5	0.2	0.2	4.3	2.8
Total		68				53.7%	38.2%	78.4%	34.9	15.9	6.4	2.3	95.4	86.7
