= STAT: Standing Tall and Talented =

Children's book series by Amar'e Stoudemire

- Cover of the first book in the series
- Home Court (2012, ISBN 9780545431699); Double Team (2012, ISBN 9780545459051); Slam Dunk (2013, ISBN 9780545488761); Schooled (2013, ISBN 9780545606073); Most Valuable (2014, ISBN 9780545606134)
- Author: Amar'e Stoudemire
- Illustrator: Tim Jessell
- Country: USA
- Language: English
- Genre: Sports
- Publisher: Scholastic Press
- Published: 2012–2014
- Media type: Print (hardcover, paperback)

STAT: Standing Tall and Talented is a series of children's books written by NBA basketball player Amar'e Stoudemire. The books are partially autobiographical and tell the story of an 11-year-old Amar'e who discovers his innate talent and has to overcome many obstacles to become the success he is today.

The books are all targeted for children aged 8+. When asked why he chose to tell his stories through novels targeted at children, Amar'e said "I decided to write for children because although I am an avid reader now, I wish I had read more as a child. I hope that together with Scholastic, we can creatively inspire a new generation to read."

== Home Court (2012) ==
Amar'e and his friends have been playing in the same court for a long time until Carlos and his friends, Yeti and Ledge, take over. The bullies keep beating Amar'e, Deuce, and Mike badly and even trashing his dad's lawn care business. Amar'e learns to overcome and manages to teach Carlos and his gang a lesson."Some people who get kicked around want to find a place to hide. Some people who get kicked want to find something to kick." This book was dedicated to Amar'e's children and brother.

== Double Team (2012) ==
Amar'e's team (Deuce and Mike, also his friends) keep winning series of games just because of Amar'e. But soon his friends get jealous at him for "hogging" the ball, especially Deuce. To make "even", Deuce and Mike don't get a sandwich for Amar'e during lunchtime, starving him. They also make sure Amar'e gets the ball once or never. Amar'e's team ends up winning 2 and losing the other half. Overtime, a famous ball player gives Amar'e an invitation to play in another game, labeled the same date Amar'e and his friends have to play their own! He mindlessly agreed, forgetting his original team. When he finally figures out, he tells Deuce and Mike, and they get jealous. Can Amar'e juggle this situation and set things right again?

== Slam Dunk (2013) ==
Eleven-year-old Amar'e has been playing good basketball lately, but other people are mad at Amare because he can't dunk so he gets his friends and puts his playing time to practice to be able to dunk. Mustafa Ismail also tries to, and he does at the end of the book after all his hard work.

== Schooled (2013) ==
Eleven-year-old Amar’e Stoudemire has participated in tournaments and street basketball. He is trying out for his school’s team, where he is considered capable of playing with older players. However, playing time is often given to those who have been on the team longest, requiring Amar’e to contribute in ways different from his previous experience.

== Most Valuable (2014) ==
Amar'e's idol, Overtime Tanner plans the biggest streetball tournament every year. But when Overtime gets hurt during a basketball game, he can't make the arrangements in time. Amar'e and his friends help set the tournament up. On top of that, each group of Amar'e's' friends wants him to play for their team and he's torn on what to do.
