= Christian Burns (basketball) =

American/Italian basketball player (born 1985)

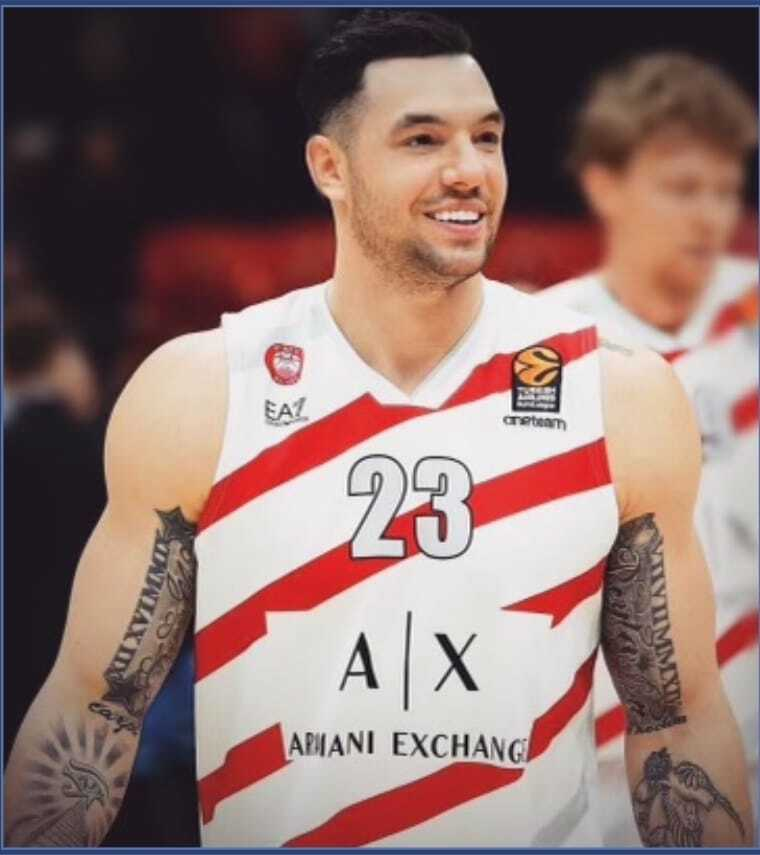

No. 23 – Pallacanestro Brescia
- Position: Power forward / center
- League: Serie B

Personal information
- Born: September 4, 1985 (age 41) Trenton, New Jersey, U.S.
- Listed height: 2.03 m (6 ft 8 in)
- Listed weight: 110 kg (243 lb)

Career information
- High school: Hamilton (Hamilton, New Jersey)
- College: Quinnipiac (2003–2005); Philadelphia (2005–2007)
- NBA draft: 2007: undrafted
- Playing career: 2007–present

Career history
- 2007–2008: AZS Koszalin
- 2008–2009: FC Porto
- 2009–2010: Ratiopharm Ulm
- 2010–2011: Ferro-ZNTU Zaporozhye
- 2011–2012: Elitzur Netanya
- 2012–2013: Sutor Montegranaro
- 2013–2014: Enisey Krasnoyarsk
- 2014–2015: ČEZ Nymburk
- 2015–2016: Al Wasl SC
- 2016–2017: Germani Brescia
- 2017–2018: Pallacanestro Cantù
- 2018–2020: Olimpia Milano
- 2020–2023: Germani Brescia
- 2022: →Napoli Basket
- 2023–2025: Pallacanestro Cantù
- 2025–2026: Vanoli Cremona
- 2026–present: Leonessa Brescia

Career highlights
- Italian Supercup champion (2018); Czech League champion (2015)
- Stats at Basketball Reference

Christian Charles Burns (born September 4, 1985) is an American-Italian professional basketball player for Leonessa Brescia of the Italian Serie B. He has also represented the Italian national team.

== Early career ==
Between his sophomore and senior year, Burns grew from 5'11" to 6’7“. After having played soccer and basketball, he focused on basketball in his senior year, averaging 19.8 points, 15.3 rebounds and 3.2 blocks a game for Hamilton High School West in Hamilton Township, Mercer County, New Jersey, while taking home County Player of the Year and Third-Team All-State (by the Associated Press) honors.

== College career ==
He started his college career at Quinnipiac, where he spent his freshman and sophomore year. He made 48 appearances for the Bobcats, averaging 3.5 points and 2.9 boards a contest. Burns transferred to NCAA Division 2 school Philadelphia University for his junior year and made an impact right away, scoring 16.7 points, grabbing 9.8 rebounds and blocking 2.2 shots per game in 2005–06. He earned Daktronics NCAA Division II National Player of the Year, ECAC Division II Player of the Year, Herb Good Small College Player of the Year and CACC Player of the Year honors his senior season (2006–07) among many other accolades, when putting up averages of 21.7 points, 11.2 rebounds and 2.1 blocks per contest.

== Professional career ==
Coming out of college in 2007, he joined the Philadelphia 76ers' summer league roster, but eventually did not make the final roster. Burns then launched his overseas career, signing with AZS Koszalin from Poland. In the following years, he played for teams in a number of different countries including Portugal, Germany, Ukraine, Israel, Italy, Russia, Czech Republic and the United Arab Emirates. In the 2010–11 campaign, when playing for Ferro-ZNTU Zaporozhye, he was named the Eurobasket.com All-Ukrainian Superleague Player of the Year. He made the Eurobasket.com All-Italian SerieA 1st Team in 2013. He then played NBA Summer League with Memphis Grizzlies and went on to win the 2015 Czech national championship with CEZ Nymburk.

Burns obtained Italian citizenship in 2016. In 2017, he represented the Italian men's national team at the European Championships.

On June 20, 2018, the president of Olimpia Milano, Livio Proli, said the club reached an agreement with Burns for 2018–19 season in the Italian LBA and also the EuroLeague. On June 28, 2018, Burns officially signed a deal with Milano where he won the Super Cup. In May 2019, he tested positive for the banned substance Clostebol Metabolita. In July 2019, he was cleared by Italy's national anti-doping tribunal.

On July 4, 2020, he returned to Basket Brescia Leonessa. That season Brescia missed the Serie A playoffs and Burns was bought on loan by Napoli Basket for the remainder of the playoffs where they won the Championship and achieved promotions to Serie A. Burns was named the final MVP.

Upon his return to Brescia the following season (2021-22), Brescia set the club record for most wins a row in Serie A. The following season, Burns won the Final 8 Trophy with Brescia.

In 2022, he signed a two-year extension with Germani Brescia of the Italian Serie A (LBA), where he went on to win the Coppa Italia in 2023. He later signed a two-year contract with Pallacanestro Cantù for the 2023–2025 seasons, before being bought out in 2025 by Vanoli Cremona, his current Serie A team.

=== The Basketball Tournament (TBT) (2016–present) ===
In the summers of 2016 and 2017, Burns played in The Basketball Tournament on ESPN for the Broad Street Brawlers. He competed for the $2 million prize, and for the Brawlers, he averaged 18 points per game in 2017. Burns helped the Brawlers reach the second round, but lost to Team Colorado 111–95.

== Career statistics ==
=== Domestic Leagues ===
Year	Team	League	GP	MPG	FG%	3P%	FT%	RPG	APG	SPG	BPG	PPG
2007–08	(Poland) Koszalin	Polish Basketball League	30	19.0	51.2%	28.0%	68.4%	4.2	0.3	0.9	0.2	8.9
2008–09	(Portugal) Porto	Liga Portuguesa de Basquetebol	34	32.6	46.2%	19.1%	71.9%	6.7	1.3	2.2	1.2	17.7
2009–10	(Germany) ratiopharm Ulm	Basketball Bundesliga	34	27.7	46.0%	28.2%	65.6%	6.3	1.2	1.3	0.4	17.7
2010–11	(Ukraine) Zaporizhya	Ukrainian Basketball SuperLeague	57	30.6	51.9%	25.8%	71.3%	7.9	1.3	1.5	0.5	16.1
2011–12	(Israel) Elitzur Netanya	Israeli Basketball Premier League	9	30.1	40.9%	33.3%	87.5%	7.4	2.4	1.4	0.4	14.3
2012–13	(Italy) Sutor Montegranaro	Serie A	30	26.7	52.5%	40.7%	77.5%	7.0	0.7	1.2	0.2	14.9
2013–14	(Russia) Enisey	VTB United League	20	28.2	48.7%	41.3%	73.7%	5.3	1.2	1.2	0.4	14.6
2014–15	(Czech Republic) Nymburk	National Basketball League	22	15.7	55.0%	18.2%	76.0%	4.1	0.9	2.2	0.4	9.5
2014–15	(Czech Republic) Nymburk	VTB United League	21	24.0	43.0%	30.8%	72.9%	5.6	0.8	0.8	0.5	10.6
2015–16	(United Arab Emirates) Al Wasl	United Arab Emirates	no data available									
2016–17	(Italy) Germani Basket Brescia	Serie A	25	23.1	45.2%	30.0%	66.2%	6.6	1.0	1.3	0.3	11.4
2017–18	(Italy) Red October Cantù	Serie A	31	30.5	50.4%	27.6%	64.2%	10.0	1.3	1.3	0.2	14.2
2018–19	(Italy) AX Armani Exchange Milano	Serie A	36	13.5	57.1%	26.3%	66.7%	3.4	0.3	0.7	0.3	4.7

=== European Competitions ===
Year	Team	GP	GS	MPG	FG%	3P%	FT%	RPG	APG	SPG	BPG	PPG	PIR
2010–11 FIBA EuroChallenge	(Ukraine) Zaporizhya	2	2	37.5	48.3%	25.0%	75.0%	7.0	1.5	2.0	0.5	16.0	n/a
2014–15 Eurocup Basketball	(Czech Republic) Nymburk	13	12	24.3	47.0%	30.8%	78.6%	4.7	1.1	1.3	0.5	11.8	11.2
2014–15 EuroChallenge	(Italy) AX Armani Exchange Milano	14	0	3.1	40.0%	0.0%	100%	0.8	0.1	0.0	0.1	1.0	0.6

=== National team ===
Year	Tournament	National Team	GP	GS	MPG	FG%	3P%	FT%	RPG	APG	SPG	BPG	PPG
2017	EuroBasket	Italy	4	0	8.8	42.9%	50.0%	100%	1.5	0.8	0.5	0.3	2.3

Legend
GP	Games played	GS	Games started	MPG	Minutes per game
FG%	Field-goal percentage	3P%	3-point field-goal percentage	FT%	Free-throw percentage
RPG	Rebounds per game	APG	Assists per game	SPG	Steals per game
BPG	Blocks per game	PPG	Points per game	PIR	Performance index rating
**Bold**	Career high
