= Amar'e Stoudemire =

American basketball player (born 1982)

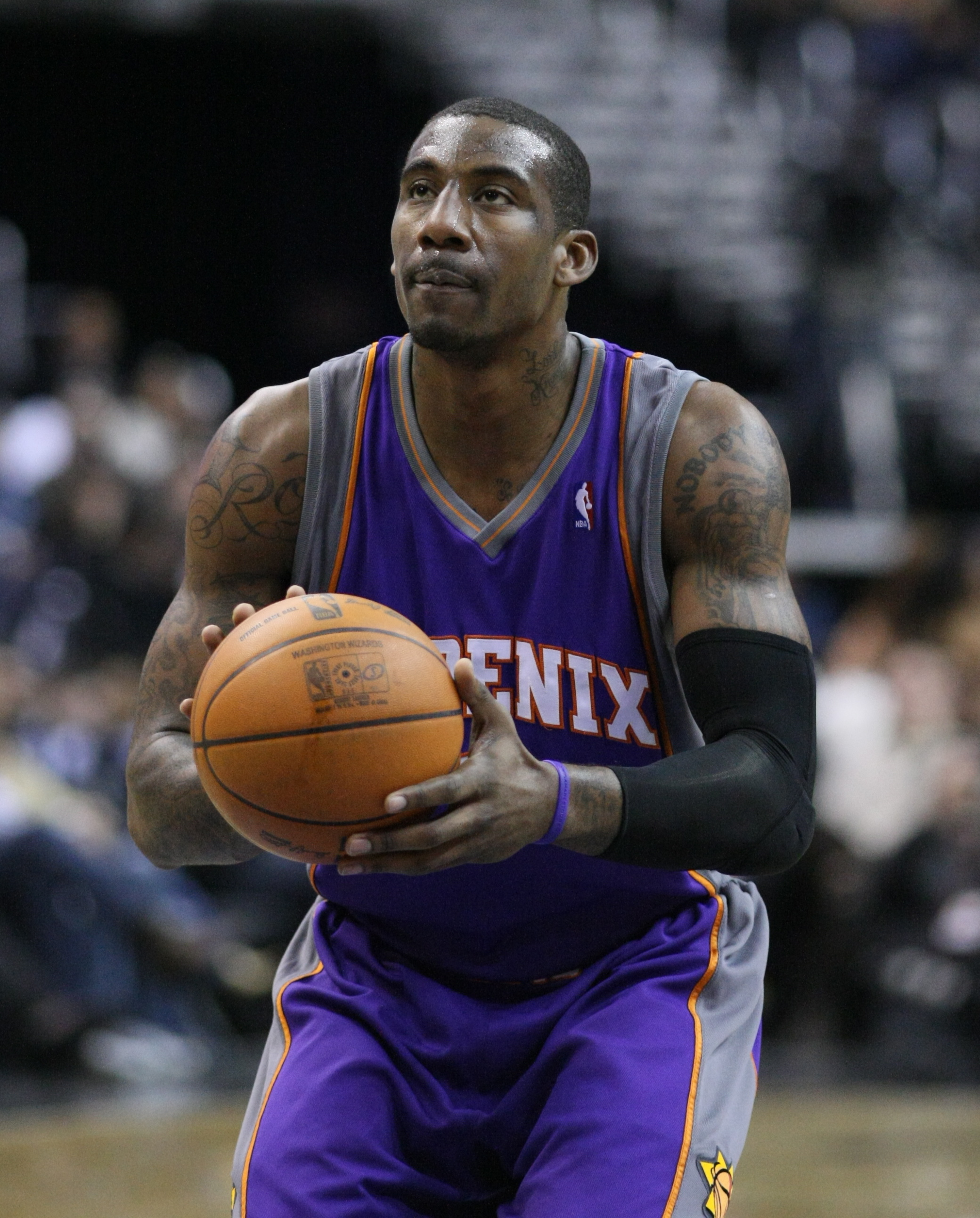
- Stoudemire with the Phoenix Suns in 2009

Personal information
- Born: November 16, 1982 (age 44) Lake Wales, Florida, U.S.
- Listed height: 6 ft 10 in (2.08 m)
- Listed weight: 245 lb (111 kg)

Career information
- High school: Lake Wales (Lake Wales, Florida); Mount Zion Christian Academy (Durham, North Carolina); Cypress Creek (Orlando, Florida)
- NBA draft: 2002: 1st round, 9th overall pick
- Drafted by: Phoenix Suns
- Playing career: 2002–2020
- Position: Power forward / center
- Number: 32, 1, 5

Career history
- 2002–2010: Phoenix Suns
- 2010–2015: New York Knicks
- 2015: Dallas Mavericks
- 2015–2016: Miami Heat
- 2016–2017, 2018–2019: Hapoel Jerusalem
- 2019: Fujian Sturgeons
- 2020: Maccabi Tel Aviv

Career highlights
- 6× NBA All-Star (2005, 2007–2011); All-NBA First Team (2007); 4× All-NBA Second Team (2005, 2008, 2010, 2011); NBA Rookie of the Year (2003); NBA All-Rookie First Team (2003); No. 32 retired by Phoenix Suns; 2× Israeli Basketball Premier League champion (2017, 2020); Israeli Basketball Premier League Finals MVP (2020); 2× Israeli Basketball Premier League All-Star (2017, 2019); Israeli Cup winner (2019); Israeli League Cup winner (2016); All-EuroCup Second Team (2017); First-team Parade All-American (2002); McDonald's All-American (2002); Florida Mr. Basketball (2002)

Career NBA statistics
- Points: 15,994 (18.9 ppg)
- Rebounds: 6,632 (7.8 rpg)
- Blocks: 1,054 (1.2 bpg)
- Stats at NBA.com
- Stats at Basketball Reference
Medals
Men's basketball
Representing the United States
Olympic Games
Bronze medal – third place	2004 Athens	Team
FIBA Americas Championship
Gold medal – first place	2007 Las Vegas	Team

Amar'e Carsares Stoudemire (Note: Pronounced /əˈmɑːreɪ ˈstɒdəmaɪər/ ə-MAR-ay STOD-ə-myre; Hebrew: אמארה יהושפט סטודמאייר) (born November 16, 1982), also known as Yehoshophat ben Avraham, is an American-Israeli professional basketball coach and former player who most recently served as a player development assistant for the Brooklyn Nets of the National Basketball Association (NBA). He was inducted into the International Jewish Sports Hall of Fame in 2025 and was inducted into the Naismith Basketball Hall of Fame in 2026.

He won the NBA Rookie of the Year Award in 2003 with the Phoenix Suns, who selected him with the ninth overall pick of the 2002 NBA draft. He made six appearances in the NBA All-Star Game and was named to the All-NBA Team five times, including one first-team selection in 2007. Stoudemire was inducted into the Phoenix Suns Ring of Honor on March 2, 2024.

Stoudemire played high school basketball for three schools, ultimately graduating from Cypress Creek High School in Orlando, Florida, and declaring for the NBA draft as a prep-to-pro player. He won several prep honors, including being selected as Florida's Mr. Basketball. Stoudemire had chronic knee problems during his career and underwent microfracture surgery on both knees. He played for the Suns, the New York Knicks, the Dallas Mavericks, and the Miami Heat before retiring from the NBA in 2016.

Stoudemire won a bronze medal with the United States national team at the 2004 Olympic Games. His off-court ventures include a record label, a clothing line, acting and a series of children's books for Scholastic Press. In addition, Stoudemire owns a significant share of Hapoel Jerusalem, the team he won a championship with in 2017. He won the championship with Maccabi Tel Aviv in 2020 and was named the Israeli Basketball Premier League Finals MVP.

== Early life ==
Stoudemire was born in Lake Wales, Florida, a small city, an hour away from Orlando, Florida. Stoudemire's parents, Hazell and Carrie (née Palmorn), divorced when he was young. Together they had two sons and a daughter: Hazell Jr., Ladesha, and Amar'e. Stoudemire's mother did agricultural work, picking oranges in Florida and migrating north to upstate New York to pick apples during the fall. Upon divorcing Hazell, she met Artis Wilmore, with whom she had a son, Marwan, Stoudemire's half-brother. His father died of a heart attack when Stoudemire was 12, and his mother was in and out of prison for crimes such as petty theft and forgery during that time. Stoudemire lived in Newburgh, New York "for about five months" in 1994 before relocating to Port Jervis, New York where he lived until 1998. In his parents' absence, Stoudemire had other outside influences to help guide him, including a policeman, Burney Hayes, he occasionally stayed with; he also lived with his Fastbreak USA, AAU squad's coach, Travis King, as well as a minister, Rev. Bill Williams.

== High school career ==
Stoudemire did not start playing organized basketball until he was 14. As a result of moving in-and-out with his mother and her problems with the law, Stoudemire transferred between five high schools in two states six different times. He first attended Lake Wales High School in Lake Wales, Florida, where his freshman season was cut short due to academic ineligibility. He transferred to Mount Zion Christian Academy in Durham, North Carolina, to play for coach Joel Hopkins. Midway through the year, Hopkins founded Emmanuel Christian Academy in a Durham office building basement and took the Mount Zion basketball team to serve as his student body; the school folded before they played a game. Stoudemire returned to Florida where he attended summer school at Dr. Phillips High School in Orlando. He briefly reenrolled at Mount Zion Academy and then sat out a year at West Orange High School in Winter Garden, Florida, due to academic ineligibility that stemmed from his transcripts from Mount Zion. His final move was to Cypress Creek High School in Orlando, Florida, where he graduated in 2002. Due to all the transfers, he missed his entire junior year of basketball and only played two full seasons.

Apart from basketball, Stoudemire excelled in football. He was coached by his father in Pop Warner football and imagined himself a star receiver for the University of Miami, University of Florida or Florida State University. Growing up he rooted for Shaquille O'Neal, center for the hometown Orlando Magic of the NBA.

In his senior year, Stoudemire averaged 29.1 points, 15 rebounds, 6.1 blocked shots, and 2.1 steals per game. Among Stoudemire's high school honors was being selected to play in the 2002 McDonald's All-American Game at Madison Square Garden in New York City, where he played with two future New York Knicks teammates, Carmelo Anthony and Raymond Felton. He was also named Florida's Mr. Basketball, the Orlando Sentinel's Florida High School Player of the Year, and to USA Today's All-USA Basketball First Team.

Considered a five-star recruit by Scout.com, Stoudemire was listed as the No. 1 player in the nation in 2002. With his biggest goal in high school being making it to the NBA, Stoudemire committed to the University of Memphis. However, he later de-committed and declared for the NBA draft, being taken with the ninth pick in the 2002 NBA draft by the Phoenix Suns. He was the only high school player taken that year in the first round.

== Professional career ==
=== Phoenix Suns (2002–2010) ===
==== 2002–03: Rookie of the Year ====
In his rookie season, Stoudemire averaged 13.5 points and 8.8 rebounds per game, with a season high of 38 points against the Minnesota Timberwolves on December 30, 2002, the highest score by a prep-to-pro player until broken a year later by LeBron James. Stoudemire was selected to the Rookie squad in the Rookie Challenge. In the game, Stoudemire recorded 18 points, 7 rebounds and 4 steals. Stoudemire won the NBA's Rookie of the Year award, beating out Yao Ming and Caron Butler and becoming the first player drafted out of high school to win the award. Stoudemire also was selected to the NBA All-Rookie First Team. The Suns, led by Stoudemire, Stephon Marbury, Shawn Marion, Penny Hardaway and Joe Johnson, made it to the playoffs but were defeated in six games by the eventual champions, the San Antonio Spurs.

==== 2003–04: Improving as a sophomore ====
During the following season, Stoudemire improved statistically, but his team stumbled to a 29–53 record, and point guard Marbury was traded to the New York Knicks. During the season Stoudemire had a 10-block game against the Utah Jazz; he recorded six blocks in the first quarter alone (both team records). During the summer of 2004, Stoudemire was selected to play for the eventual bronze medal-winning 2004 U.S. national team in the Summer Olympics. However, head coach Larry Brown declined to give him significant playing time (6.9 minutes per game).

==== 2004–05: First All-Star and All-NBA appearances ====
During the 2004–05 season, Stoudemire teamed up with point guard Steve Nash whom the Suns signed as a free agent, to lead the Suns to a 62–20 record. Averaging 26 points per game that year and achieving a new career high of 50 points against the Portland Trail Blazers, he was selected to his first NBA All-Star Game as a reserve forward. Stoudemire and Nash ran a pick-and-roll some have compared to Hall of Famers John Stockton and Karl Malone. In the Western Conference Finals against the San Antonio Spurs, Stoudemire averaged 37 points per game, but the Suns still lost in five games.

==== 2005–06: Knee problems ====
On October 4, 2005, Stoudemire signed a five-year, $73 million with a player option in the final season. During the 2005–06 NBA preseason, knee cartilage damage was discovered and Stoudemire underwent microfracture surgery on October 18, 2005. Initially, the Suns thought he would return by mid-February, but his rehab took longer than expected. Stoudemire, however, scored 20 points in his return against the Portland Trail Blazers, but went scoreless his third game against the New Jersey Nets on March 27, 2006. On March 28 it was announced that he would likely miss the rest of the regular season due to ongoing stiffness in both knees. Stoudemire's rehabilitation, which was led by Suns trainer Aaron Nelson and Dr. Micheal Clark, the president and CEO of the National Academy of Sports Medicine (NASM), went well as he stated during the rehab that he was explosive and he gradually gained his strength back.

Stoudemire attended the 2006 USA Basketball camp in Las Vegas, although he ultimately did not play in the 2006 FIBA World Championship.

==== 2006–07: Comeback and All-NBA First Team selection ====
Before the 2006–07 season, Stoudemire changed his jersey number from 32 to 1. Dijon Thompson had worn no. 1 the previous season.

On February 18, 2007, Stoudemire appeared in the 2007 NBA All-Star Game, his second All-Star Game appearance. He scored 29 points and grabbed 9 rebounds, but missed out on the MVP award to Kobe Bryant.

Stoudemire attempts a free-throw vs. the Minnesota Timberwolves, 2007

During the 2007 playoffs, in a series against the San Antonio Spurs, Stoudemire accused Manu Ginóbili and Bruce Bowen of being "dirty" players. Stoudemire, along with teammate Boris Diaw, was suspended for Game 5 for leaving the bench area after an altercation between teammate Steve Nash and Spurs forward Robert Horry. The Suns lost to the Spurs in six games despite Stoudemire averaging 26.4 points, 10.6 rebounds and 2 blocks throughout the series. He finished the 2006–07 regular season averaging 20.4 points and 9.6 rebounds per game. He was selected to the All-NBA First Team.

==== 2007–10: Eye surgery and playoff defeats ====
Stoudemire played in the FIBA Americas Championship 2007, but withdrew from the national team for the 2008 Olympics. Jerry Colangelo, managing director for the national team, said, "Amar'e has pulled himself out of consideration for the roster and that's predicated on, despite the fact that he's had an injury-free year coming back, he's a little hesitant on pushing the envelope too hard." Stoudemire had said in April 2008, "It's more than a year-round grind. It's last year and the year before that and the year before that. It's really been like a three-year-round basketball circuit."

Stoudemire led the Suns in scoring (25.2 per game) and rebounds (9.1 per game) in the 2007–08 season. He made the All-Star team and was named to the All-NBA Second Team. Stoudemire also adjusted well to playing with veteran center Shaquille O'Neal, who the Suns had acquired in February. The Suns, however, faltered in the playoffs, again losing to their rivals the San Antonio Spurs. The Suns blew a big lead in game one of the series, and seemed to never recover, losing the series 4–1 to the Spurs. Stoudemire averaged 23 points in the series. After the season, Suns head coach Mike D'Antoni left the team to coach the New York Knicks.

Under new coach Terry Porter, the Suns struggled early in 2008–09 with his system and lost five games in a row heading into the 2009 All-Star break. Stoudemire was voted a starter for the Western Conference. On February 18, in a game against the Los Angeles Clippers, Stoudemire suffered a detached retina. Despite suffering it in the first quarter, he finished the game with 42 points and made 15 of his 20 field goal attempts. He had injured the same eye in preseason, although this injury involved a partially torn iris, with no damage to his retina. He said then that he would have to wear protective goggles for the rest of his career, but stopped wearing them after seven games. Stoudemire underwent eye surgery to repair the retina. The recovery took eight weeks, which forced him to miss the remainder of the regular season. He announced that he would wear protective goggles when he returned to play the following season.

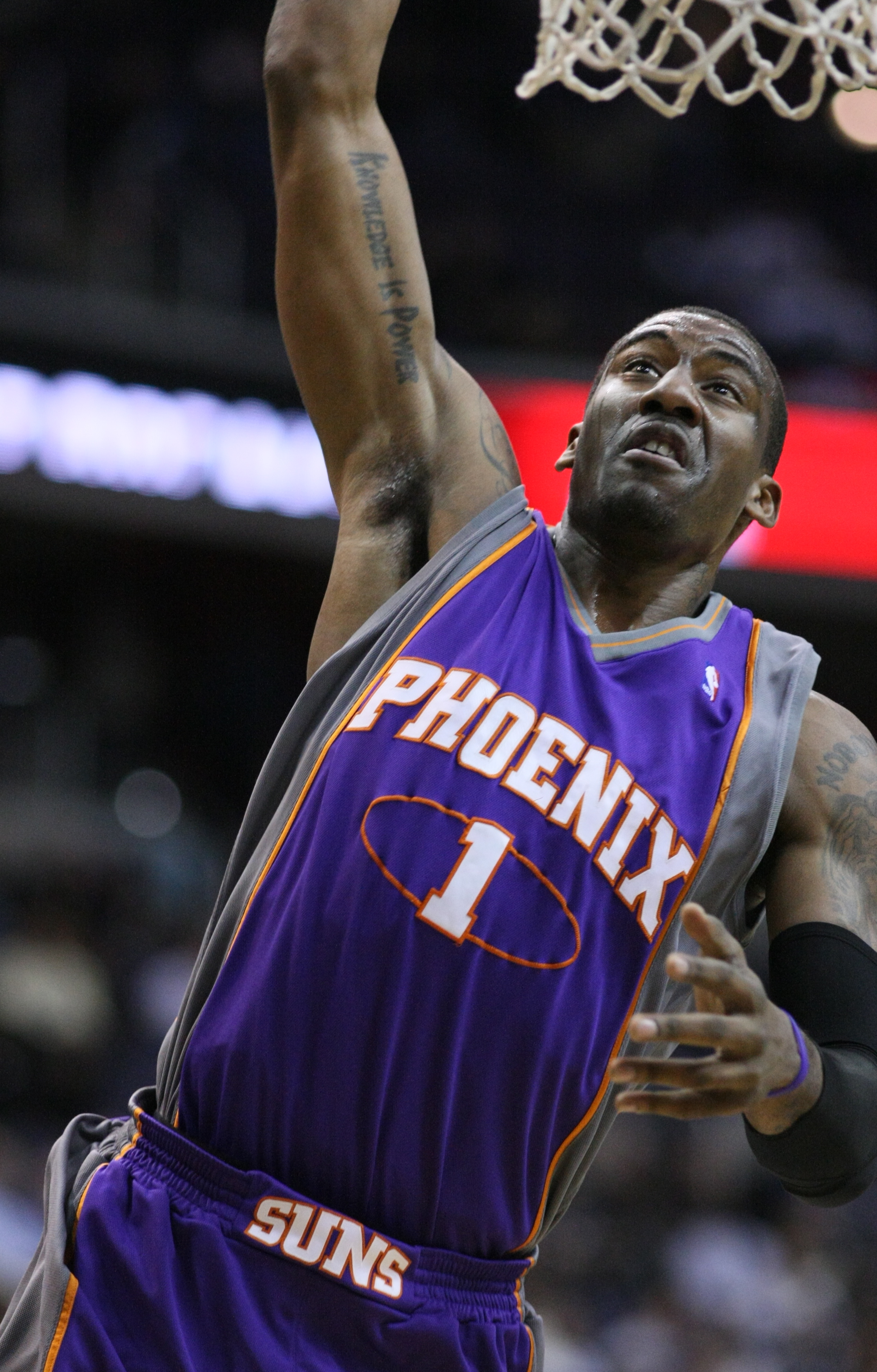
Stoudemire in 2009

In the 2009–10 season, Stoudemire was once again named to the All-Star team. During the season, Paul Coro of The Arizona Republic reported that the Suns and Cleveland Cavaliers discussed a trade that would have sent Stoudemire to Cleveland to pair up with LeBron James; the deal, however, never went through. Another proposed deal during the 2009 NBA draft would have sent Stoudemire to the Golden State Warriors for a package centered around the #7 overall pick, but the Warriors backed out of the deal at the last minute and selected Stephen Curry with the pick. Stoudemire would eventually lead the Suns to a 54–28 record, clinching the third seed in the Western Conference. Stoudemire finished the season averaging 23 points and 9 rebounds on 56% shooting. The Suns would defeat the Portland Trail Blazers 4–2 during the first round of the playoffs and beat the San Antonio Spurs 4–0 in the Conference Semifinals, to meet the defending champion Los Angeles Lakers in the Conference Finals. After dropping the first two games, Stoudemire would score 42 points in game 3 and 21 in game 4, to help the Suns tie the series 2–2. The Suns failed to win any additional games in the series, dropping it 4–2.

Stoudemire finished his tenure with the Suns fourth in franchise history in scoring average (21.4 points per game), third in rebounds, free throws made and attempted, fifth in blocked shots, and single-game records of consecutive free throws in one game (20) and blocked shots (10).

=== New York Knicks (2010–2015) ===
==== 2010–11: First season in New York ====
On June 30, 2010, Stoudemire opted out of his contract with the Phoenix Suns, which made him an unrestricted free agent. On July 5, 2010, Stoudemire and the New York Knicks agreed in principle to a contract estimated to be worth around $99.7 million over five years. On the first day that free agents were allowed to officially sign, the Knicks formally introduced Stoudemire at Madison Square Garden. There Stoudemire proclaimed "the Knicks are back!" referring to the team's lack of success the past few years. With the Knicks, Stoudemire was reunited with head coach Mike D'Antoni, who had coached him with the Suns. On December 15, 2010, in a loss against the Boston Celtics, Stoudemire set a franchise record with his ninth straight 30-point game. On December 17, 2010, Stoudemire set a franchise record with his ninth straight game shooting 50 percent or better from the field. On January 27, 2011, Stoudemire was named a starter on the Eastern Conference All-Star Team alongside LeBron James, Dwyane Wade, Derrick Rose, and Dwight Howard. He became the first Knicks player to start in the game since Patrick Ewing. In the game Stoudemire scored 29 points, which tied him with LeBron James for most on the Eastern Conference team. On February 22, 2011, the Knicks made a three-team trade with the Denver Nuggets and Minnesota Timberwolves that sent Nuggets superstar Carmelo Anthony to the Knicks along with the Nuggets' starting point guard Chauncey Billups. In 2011, the Knicks made the playoffs for the first time since 2004. Stoudemire was injured during the playoffs. In game 3, Stoudemire attempted a Willis Reed-like comeback by playing in the game despite a bad back. In the first round of the playoffs, the Knicks were swept by the Boston Celtics. Stoudemire ended up having one of the best seasons in his career, averaging 25.3 points, 9.1 rebounds, a career-high 2.6 assists and 2 blocks per game. Stoudemire developed a mid-range game and shot a career-high 43% from three-point range. Stoudemire was named to the All-NBA Second Team.

==== 2011–12: Struggles ====
During the 2011 NBA lockout, Stoudemire served as a player representative for the Knicks. Stoudemire represented the Knicks along with teammates Carmelo Anthony, Chauncey Billups, Toney Douglas, and Roger Mason Jr., who was Vice President of the Players Union. Stoudemire considered playing overseas for Maccabi Tel Aviv B.C. due to his possible Hebrew heritage, but instead opted to stay with the players union. In October 2011, Stoudemire appeared on ESPN First Take, where he promoted his new sneaker line, the Nike Air Max Sweep Thru. During the lockout, Stoudemire trained and took history seminars at Florida International University. He also dabbled in acting, appearing in the second-last episode ("Second to Last") of Entourage.

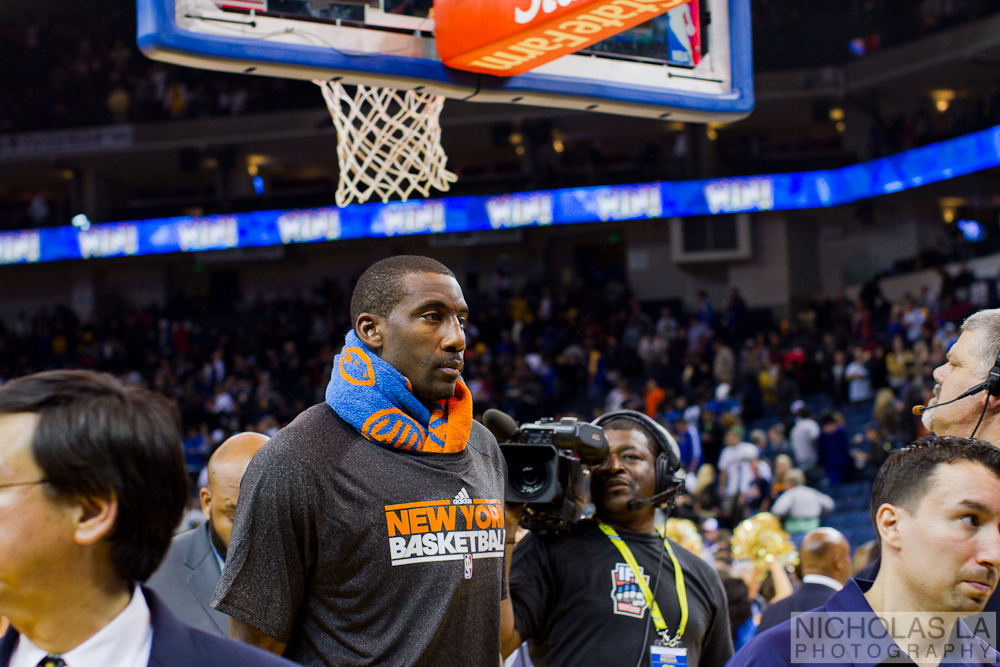
Stoudemire with the Knicks in 2011

Before the 2011–12 season, the Knicks acquired Tyson Chandler, but released point guard Chauncey Billups via the amnesty clause. Early on in the season, Stoudemire struggled without a point guard to distribute the basketball. In February 2012, Stoudemire missed four games mourning the death of his older brother, Hazell, who had died in a car accident. Later that month, the Eastern Conference All-Stars were announced; Stoudemire was not voted in, nor selected by the coaches to play in the All-Star Game. It was the first year since 2006 that he was not selected to the All-Star Game. Stoudemire was struggling with efficiency and explosiveness and blamed it on the weight he gained during the NBA lockout and so engaged in a weight loss program, losing 10 pounds in 10 days with a goal to reach 245 pounds. The weight loss proved to be beneficial for Stoudemire, as he averaged 18 points per game on 56% shooting March. After a good March, however, Stoudemire suffered a bulging disk in his back. Stoudemire returned with a few games remaining in the regular season. The seventh-seeded Knicks were paired with the defending Eastern Conference champions in the Miami Heat heading into the Eastern Conference First Round. After a loss in Game 2, Stoudemire suffered from a self-inflicted cut to his left hand after punching a fire extinguisher box in the visitors' locker room. The wound required stitches to mend. Stoudemire returned for game four and recorded 20 points and 10 rebounds, in a Knicks victory. The victory snapped a record 13 game playoff losing streak for the Knicks. The Knicks would, however, not win another game as they lost the series 4–1 to the Heat. In the Heat's series clinching win in game 5, Stoudemire fouled out after the Heat's Shane Battier drew an offensive foul; this led to the Heat's PA announcer announcing Stoudemire had been extinguished, referring to Stoudemire's hand injury. The Heat later issued an apology to Stoudemire. The 2011–2012 season was a disappointment as Stoudemire's production dropped off in every statistical category from the prior year. Stoudemire averaged 17.5 points, which was down almost 8 points from the prior year, 7.8 rebounds, 1.1 assists and 1.0 blocks.

==== 2012–14: Injury-plagued seasons ====
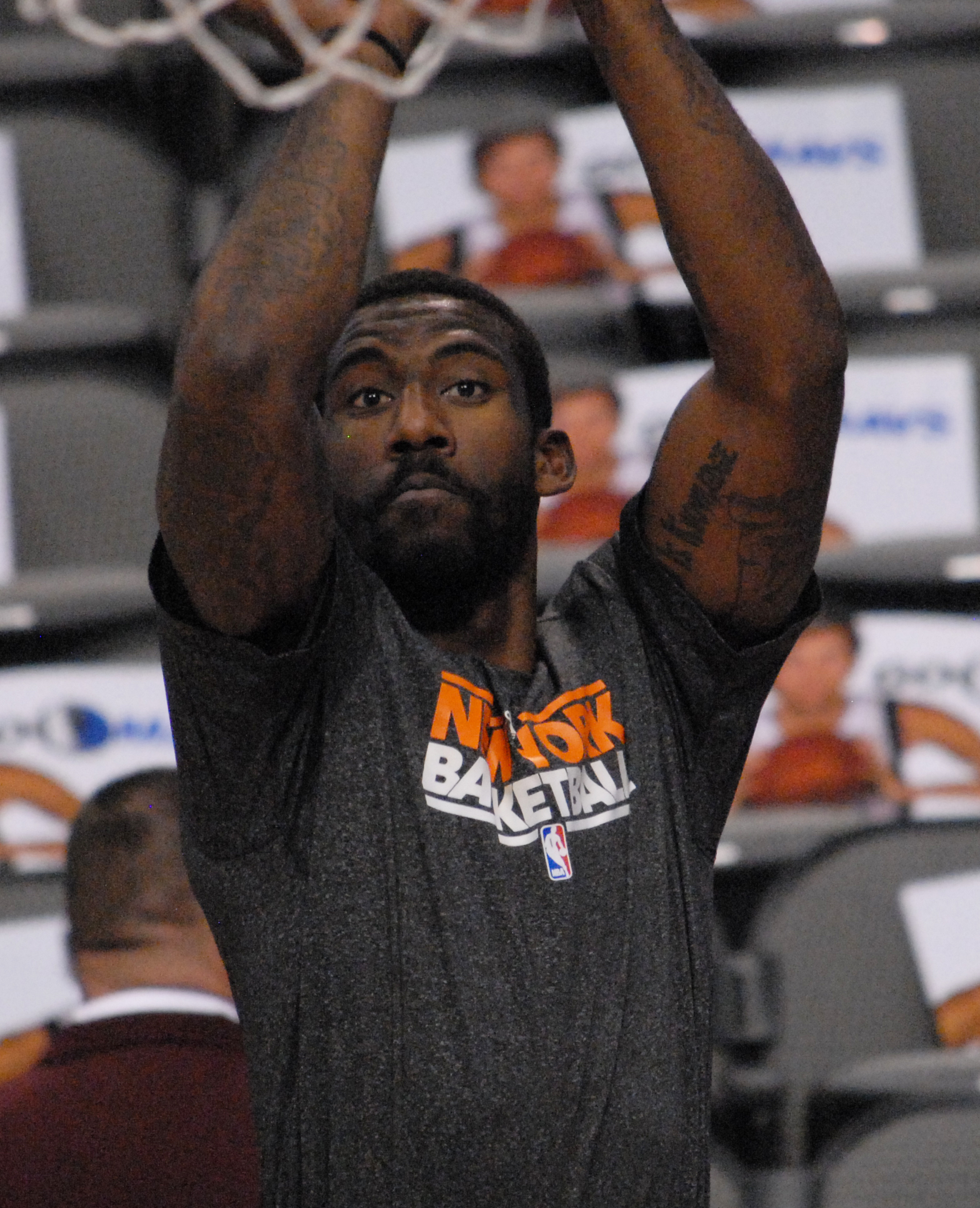
Stoudemire in 2012

Stoudemire missed the first 30 games of the 2012–13 season with a knee injury. On December 18, 2012, he was assigned to the Erie BayHawks of the NBA D-League so that he could practice with that team as he continued his rehab. He was recalled by the Knicks on December 21. Stoudemire made his season debut on January 1, 2013, at home against Portland, playing 17 minutes off the bench, scoring six points and grabbing one rebound. After returning Stoudemire was restricted to playing a maximum of 30 minutes a game.

It was announced on March 9, 2013, that Stoudemire would have a right knee debridement. He missed the rest of the regular season because of that. For the first time in his career, he was not a starter, but a sixth man for the New York Knicks. He only played 29 games during the season, averaging 14.2 points per game and 5 rebounds per game in 23.5 minutes per game. Even without him for most of the time, the Knicks finished 54–28 (second-best in the Eastern Conference), made the playoffs for the third time in a row, and won their first Atlantic Division title since the 1993–94 season. Stoudemire was still out when the New York Knicks defeated the Boston Celtics in six games which would be the Knicks' first playoff victory since 2000. He returned to action on May 11, 2013, in Game 3 during the Knicks' Eastern Conference Semifinals series against the Indiana Pacers. The Knicks ended up losing to the Pacers in 6 games.

After injuries limited him to 47 and 29 games played in the previous two seasons, respectively, Stoudemire bounced back for the Knicks in the 2013–14 season. Not only did he manage to play in 65 games, but he grew stronger as the year progressed. He maintained his offensive efficiency as his workload increased, ultimately forcing his way into the starting five for good on March 3 in Detroit. Once there, he led New York to seven straight wins in games in which he played. In 14 games in March, he averaged 16.9 points and 6.6 rebounds per game, while averaging 28.3 minutes as he proved capable of playing power forward alongside Tyson Chandler or center in small lineups.

With the Knicks' playoff hopes hanging on by a thread with a week to go in the regular season, Stoudemire put together arguably his best performance of the season, lighting up the division-leading Toronto Raptors for 24 points on 10-of-14 shooting and 11 rebounds. However, despite Stoudemire's efforts, the Knicks failed to qualify for the 2014 playoffs, finishing just shy with a 35–47 record and a ninth-place finish in the East.

==== 2014–15: Final year with Knicks ====
Having played predominantly in a bench role for the Knicks in 2013–14, Stoudemire's role in 2014–15 began much the same, and with it came solid production as he missed just one game over the first 28. He proved to be a solid leader off the bench for a fledgling Knicks team that had won just five games by mid-December, as he averaged 13.4 points and 7.4 rebounds per game up to and including the December 18 loss to Chicago. He went on to miss the next 12 out of 13 games with another knee injury, returning to action on January 15 in London to face Milwaukee, as he went scoreless in eight first-half minutes and did not play after half time.

On February 16, 2015, Stoudemire was waived by the Knicks after an agreement was reached to buy out his contract.

=== Dallas Mavericks (2015) ===
On February 18, 2015, Stoudemire signed with the Dallas Mavericks. Four days later, he made his debut for the Mavericks against the Charlotte Hornets and recorded 14 points in just 11 minutes off the bench. Stoudemire went on to play in 23 games for the Mavericks and averaged 10.8 points and 3.7 rebounds per game.

=== Miami Heat (2015–2016) ===
On July 10, 2015, Stoudemire signed with the Miami Heat. He played in just one of the Heat's first 10 games of the 2015–16 season, largely due to knee soreness. He played eight minutes of first half action against the Sacramento Kings on November 19, scoring 10 points off the bench to spark the Heat early, as the team went on to win the game 116–109. On January 31, 2016, he recorded season highs of 13 points and 12 rebounds against the Atlanta Hawks, starting in place of the injured Hassan Whiteside. Two days later, he set a new season high with 14 points in a loss to the Houston Rockets, starting at center for the Heat in his sixth straight game. Stoudemire's final NBA game was played in Game 5 of the Eastern Conference semifinals against the Toronto Raptors on May 11, 2016. The Heat lost the game 99–91, with Stoudemire only playing 3 minutes as the Heat's starting center, recording one rebound and one steal. The Heat would go on to lose the series in seven games.

On July 26, 2016, Stoudemire signed a contract with the New York Knicks to retire as a Knick, as he announced his retirement from the NBA later that day after 14 seasons in the league.

=== Hapoel Jerusalem (2016–2019) ===
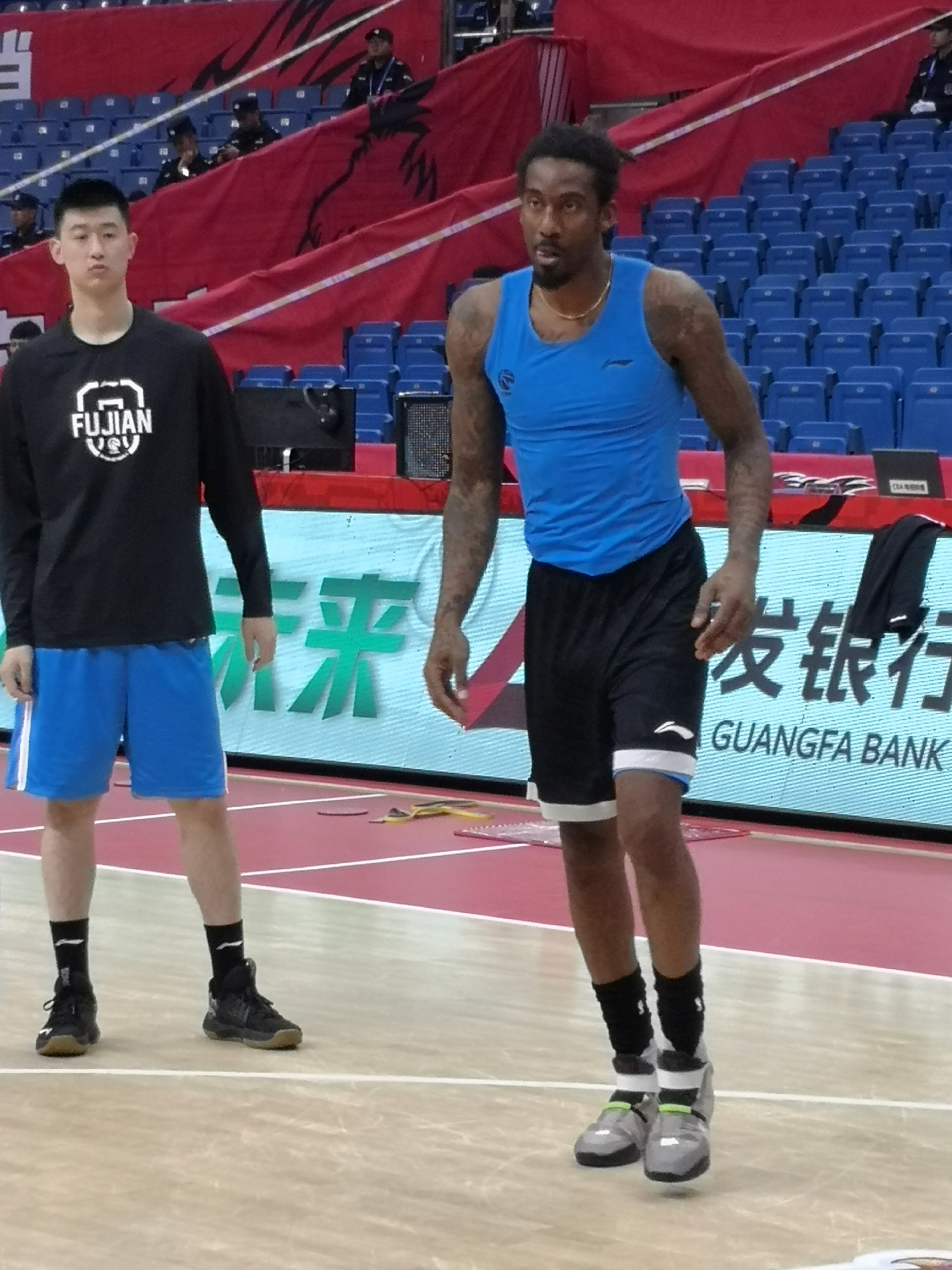
Stoudemire with the Fujian Sturgeons in November 2019

Though he retired from the NBA, Stoudemire did not retire from playing basketball, and on August 1, 2016, he signed a two-year deal with Hapoel Jerusalem, a team he co-owns in the Israeli Basketball Premier League. On October 1, 2016, he helped Hapoel Jerusalem win the Israeli Basketball League Cup. He went on to earn All-EuroCup Second Team honors for the 2016–17 season, as well as Israeli Basketball Premier League All-Star honors. In June 2017, he helped Hapoel Jerusalem win the 2016–17 Israeli Basketball Super League.

On September 1, 2017, Stoudemire announced his retirement from basketball.

In February 2018, Stoudemire joined BIG3 team Tri State as co-captain. Three months later, Stoudemire announced that he was contemplating a return to playing professional basketball in the NBA.

On September 24, Stoudemire came out of retirement to sign with Hapoel Jerusalem for the 2018–19 season. On October 31, Stoudemire recorded a season-high 24 points, shooting 10-of-16 from the field, along with seven rebounds in a 105–75 win over Montakit Fuenlabrada, and was named to the Champions League's Team of the Week. On May 2, 2019, Stoudemire was named Israeli Premier League Player of the Month after averaging 16.3 points and 7.5 rebounds per game in four games played in April.

=== Fujian Sturgeons (2019) ===
On October 30, 2019, Stoudemire signed with the Fujian Sturgeons of the Chinese Basketball Association. He appeared in 11 games for the Sturgeons, averaging 19.3 points and 8.3 rebounds per game. In mid-December 2019, Stoudemire had left the team to return to the United States.

=== Maccabi Tel Aviv (2020) ===
On January 22, 2020, Stoudemire returned to Israel for a third stint, signing with Maccabi Tel Aviv for the rest of the season. In July 2020, he helped Maccabi Tel Aviv win the championship while earning Israeli Basketball Premier League Finals MVP honors.

== Coaching career ==
On October 30, 2020, Stoudemire was hired by the Brooklyn Nets as a player development assistant. On May 12, 2022, he announced he would not be returning to the Nets for the 2022–23 season.

== Personal life ==
=== Relationships ===
Stoudemire has four children with his ex-wife, Alexis Welch. Having dated since 2002, the two were engaged in May 2012 and later married on December 12, 2012, atop their Greenwich Village apartment rooftop. Stoudemire filed for divorce from his wife in October 2018 but the case was dismissed in July 2019 after he failed to submit the required documents to follow through. Two years later Alexis filed for divorce, which was finalized in 2021.

Stoudemire's first name had previously been listed in the Phoenix Suns media guide as Amaré or Amare, but it was changed to Amar'e in October 2008. Stoudemire told NBA.com that his name had always been spelled Amar'e, but the media had been spelling it incorrectly since he joined the NBA.

Stoudemire was raised Baptist. Through his mother, he associated with the Black Hebrew Israelites. In a 2010 interview, he said, "I have been aware since my youth that I am a Hebrew through my mother, and that is something that has played a subtle but important role in my development." Asked if there was a chance he was Jewish, he said "I think through history, I think we all are." He visited Israel that year, saying he intended "to get a better understanding of [his] heritage." He returned for the 2013 Maccabiah Games as assistant coach of the Canadian basketball team; while there he met with Israeli president Shimon Peres, who urged him to join the Israel national basketball team. In April 2018, he reportedly began converting to Judaism. In January 2019, he was granted residency in Israel. In March 2019, he received Israeli citizenship, and adopted the name Yahoshafat Ben Avraham. He formally converted to Judaism with a Rabbinical court on August 26, 2020.

In the early morning hours of February 6, 2012, Stoudemire's older brother, Hazell, was killed in a car accident in Polk County, Florida. He was not wearing a seat belt at the time of the crash.

In December 2014, Stoudemire purchased a 185-acre (75 ha) farm in Hyde Park, New York, which includes a 2,066-square-foot (190 m^{2}) log home. Stoudemire said that he intended to use the property as a place where his family can get together on weekends and in the off-season.

=== Conversion to Judaism ===
After his retirement from the NBA, while playing for Hapoel Jerusalem in 2018, Stoudemire started studying Judaism in Ohr Somayach, Jerusalem with the purpose of converting. He formally completed his conversion in August 2020, taking on the Hebrew name Yehoshophat ben Avraham, from his legal name "Jehoshaphat" and the common family name given to converts "ben Avraham".

At his 2026 induction into the Naismith Memorial Basketball Hall of Fame, Stoudemire said that he had studied Torah privately for 20 years and that this long-running study influenced his decision to play in Israel and deepen his Jewish learning.

== Off the court ==
=== Philanthropy ===
Stoudemire started the Each One, Teach One foundation in 2003. Stoudemire also funded his very own AAU team, named Team STAT. Stoudemire played Wheel of Fortune during its NBA week and donated all his winnings to the Boys and Girls Clubs of the Greater Phoenix area. In November 2008, Stoudemire received the NBA's Community Assist Award, for his work with his Each 1, Teach 1 Foundation, and its efforts to provide safe drinking water in Sierra Leone by funding the building of water wells in impoverished villages. Stoudemire visited the country in summer 2008, making visits to water well sites and meeting with President Ernest Bai Koroma and the rest of the cabinet. In 2010 Stoudemire hosted the first Amar'e Stoudemire Basketball Academy in Mali. That same year, he posed shirtless on behalf of PETA's Ink Not Mink campaign, protesting the wearing of animal fur.

=== Film and television ===
After guest appearances on Law & Order: SVU, Entourage and Sesame Street in 2011, Amar'e appeared on TV Land's The Exes opposite Kristen Johnston in a January episode. Stoudemire also appeared on Fox's comedy series, The Mindy Project, where Mindy Kaling's character went on an outing with her co-workers to a nightclub, and wound up hanging in the VIP section with the New York big man. Stoudemire's acting roles have not been limited to television. He had a role in the film MacGruber and appeared in the blockbuster romance New Year's Eve. He also appeared as himself in the comedy film Trainwreck, as one of the patients of sports surgeon Dr. Aaron Conners (played by Bill Hader).

=== Other ventures ===
In 2011, Stoudemire started his own clothing line, which launched at Macy's in late 2011. It was designed with the help of Rachel Roy. Stoudemire described the line as "courtside apparel for the fashion-forward female". Stoudemire has his own record label named Hypocalypto and has signed rappers from Phoenix to Atlanta.

In August 2011, Stoudemire signed a deal with Scholastic Press to write a series of middle-grade chapter books called STAT: Standing Tall And Talented. The first book in the series, STAT: Home Court, which Stoudemire described as biographical, was published in August 2012.

In the summer of 2013, Stoudemire became a major shareholder of Hapoel Jerusalem B.C. together with sports agent Arn Tellem and Ori Allon. Later that year, he also became an assistant coach for the Canadian men's national basketball team for the 2013 Maccabiah Games.

In February 2018, Stoudemire launched a kosher, Israeli wine label, called Stoudemire Cellars. The label launched with three wines, all of which are produced at Tulip Winery in Kfar Tikvah. Stoudemire is also an art collector.

== Awards and honors ==
- Naismith Basketball Hall of Fame inducted in August 2026
- Israeli Basketball Premier League champion: 2017, 2020
- Israeli Basketball Premier League Finals MVP: 2020
- Israeli Cup winner: 2019
- Israeli League Cup winner: 2016
- NBA Rookie of the Year: 2003
- NBA All-Star: 2005, 2007–2011
- All-NBA First Team: 2007
- All-NBA Second Team: 2005, 2008, 2010, 2011
- NBA All-Rookie First Team: 2003
- Rising Stars Challenge MVP 2004
- Orlando Sentinel Florida High School Player of the Year: 2002
- Florida Mr. Basketball: 2002
- USA Today All-USA Basketball First Team: 2002
- Prep Stars Recruiter's Handbook No. 1 High School Player in the United States: 2002

== Career statistics ==
Legend
GP	Games played	GS	Games started	MPG	Minutes per game
FG%	Field goal percentage	3P%	3-point field goal percentage	FT%	Free throw percentage
RPG	Rebounds per game	APG	Assists per game	SPG	Steals per game
BPG	Blocks per game	PPG	Points per game	**Bold**	Career high
*	Led the league

=== NBA ===
==== Regular season ====
Year	Team	GP	GS	MPG	FG%	3P%	FT%	RPG	APG	SPG	BPG	PPG
2002–03	Phoenix	**82**	71	31.3	.472	.200	.661	8.8	1.0	.8	1.1	13.5
2003–04	Phoenix	55	53	**36.8**	.475	.200	.713	9.0	1.4	**1.2**	1.6	20.6
2004–05	Phoenix	80	80	36.1	.559	.188	.733	8.9	1.6	1.0	1.6	**26.0**
2005–06	Phoenix	3	3	16.7	.333	.000	**.889**	5.3	.7	.3	1.0	8.7
2006–07	Phoenix	**82***	78	32.8	.575	.000	.781	**9.6**	1.0	1.0	1.3	20.4
2007–08	Phoenix	79	79	33.9	**.590**	.161	.805	9.1	1.5	.8	**2.1**	25.2
2008–09	Phoenix	53	53	**36.8**	.539	.429	.835	8.1	2.0	.9	1.1	21.4
2009–10	Phoenix	**82***	**82***	34.6	.557	.167	.771	8.9	1.0	.6	1.0	23.1
2010–11	New York	78	78	**36.8**	.502	**.435**	.792	8.2	**2.6**	.9	1.9	25.3
2011–12	New York	47	47	32.8	.483	.238	.765	7.8	1.1	.8	1.0	17.5
2012–13	New York	29	0	23.5	.577	.000	.808	5.0	.4	.3	.7	14.2
2013–14	New York	65	21	22.6	.557	.000	.739	4.9	.5	.4	.6	11.9
2014–15	New York	36	14	24.0	.543	.000	.740	6.8	1.0	.6	.9	12.0
2014–15	Dallas	23	1	16.5	.581	.000	.678	3.7	.3	.4	.2	10.8
2015–16	Miami	52	36	14.7	.566	.000	.746	4.3	.5	.3	.8	5.8
Career		846	696	31.0	.537	.236	.761	7.8	1.2	.8	1.2	18.9
All-Star		6	3	19.5	.571	.400	.750	7.5	1.2	.7	.7	18.8

==== Playoffs ====
Year	Team	GP	GS	MPG	FG%	3P%	FT%	RPG	APG	SPG	BPG	PPG
2003	Phoenix	6	6	33.8	.523	**1.000**	.571	7.8	1.2	**1.7**	1.5	14.2
2005	Phoenix	15	15	40.1	.539	.000	.781	10.7	1.2	.7	2.0	**29.9**
2007	Phoenix	10	10	34.3	.523	.333	.769	**12.1**	.6	1.3	1.9	25.3
2008	Phoenix	5	5	**40.8**	.485	.250	.633	9.0	.4	1.4	**2.4**	23.2
2010	Phoenix	**16**	**16**	36.5	.519	.000	.754	6.6	1.1	.7	1.5	22.2
2011	New York	4	4	33.5	.382	.000	.667	7.8	**1.8**	.3	.8	14.5
2012	New York	4	4	36.5	.556	.000	.750	6.5	.8	1.3	.3	15.3
2013	New York	4	0	8.3	.385	**1.000**	**1.000**	2.3	.0	.0	.0	3.8
2015	Dallas	5	0	15.0	.429	.000	.692	3.2	.6	.2	.6	7.8
2016	Miami	9	2	9.1	**.579**	.000	**1.000**	1.4	.0	.6	.3	3.3
Career		78	62	30.7	.512	.250	.750	7.4	.8	.8	1.3	18.7

=== ISBL career statistics ===
==== Regular season ====
Year	Team	GP	GS	MPG	FG%	3P%	FT%	RPG	APG	SPG	BPG	PPG
2016–17	Hapoel Jerusalem B.C.	23	0	22.8	.613	.250	.725	5.9	0.3	0.3	1.3	9.9
2018–19	Hapoel Jerusalem B.C.	11	0	20.6	.558	.000	.860	6.5	0.3	0.2	0.6	13.6
2020	Maccabi Tel Aviv B.C.	12	0	15.2	.698	1.000	.750	4.2	1.3	0.2	0.0	8.0

==== Playoffs ====
Year	Team	GP	GS	MPG	FG%	3P%	FT%	RPG	APG	SPG	BPG	PPG
2017	Hapoel Jerusalem B.C.	5	0	13.6	.611	.000	.714	4.4	0.2	0.2	0.8	6.4
2019	Hapoel Jerusalem B.C.	4	0	20.0	.577	.000	.667	4.0	2.0	1.0	0.8	12.0
2020	Maccabi Tel Aviv B.C.	5	0	18.8	.667	.000	.800	5.0	0.8	0.0	0.4	10.4

=== CBA career statistics ===
==== Regular season ====
Year	Team	GP	GS	MPG	FG%	3P%	FT%	RPG	APG	SPG	BPG	PPG
2019	Jinjiang	11	0	27.9	.513	.333	.790	**8.3**	**0.9**	**0.7**	**1.2**	19.4

== See also ==
- List of NBA single-game blocks leaders
- List of select Jewish basketball players
