= PalaLeonessa =

Indoor sports arena in Brescia, Italy

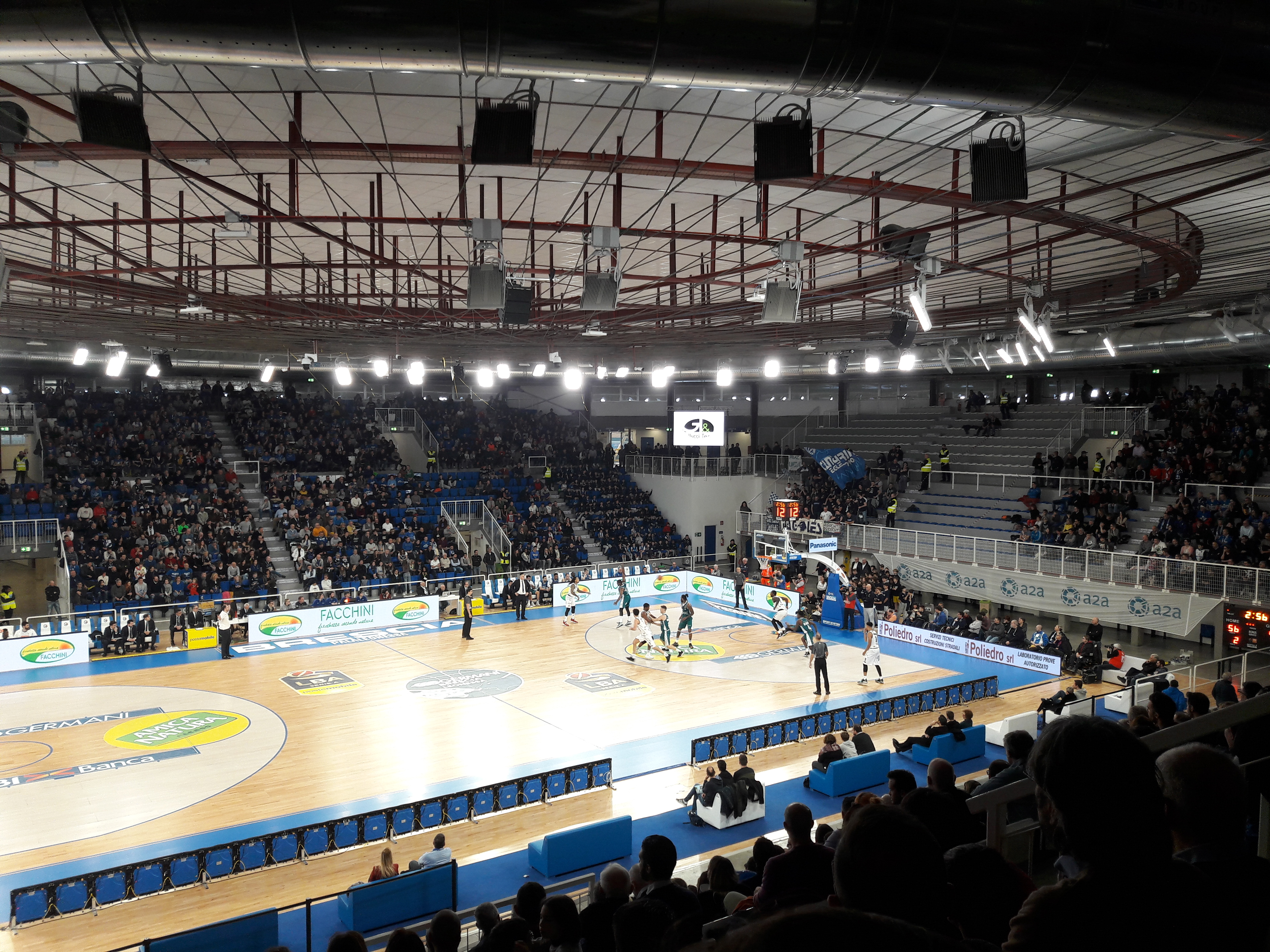
- Interactive map of PalaLeonessa
- Full name: PalaLeonessa Sport & Events
- Former names: PalaEIB
- Address: Via Caprera 5; 25125 Brescia BS, Lombardy Italy
- Location: Brescia
- Coordinates: 45°31′38″N 10°10′29″E
- Owner: City of Brescia
- Operator: Centro Sportivo S.Filippo SpA
- Capacity: 5,200

Construction
- Opened: 21 May 1967
- Renovated: 2017–2018
- Cost: €6,8 Million
- Architect: Eliseo Papa

Tenants
- Brescia Leonessa (LBA, EuroCup) (2018–present)

The PalaLeonessa (originally the PalaEIB) is an indoor sports arena that is located in Brescia, Italy. The arena has a seating capacity of 5,200 and is primarily used for basketball. The venue is the home ground of the Italian League professional basketball team Germani Basket Brescia.

On 18 June 2018 the new logo of the arena was revealed at Brescia City Hall with the Mayor of the city, Emilio Del Bono, and Graziella Bragaglio, president of the club.

== Sports ==
The arena hosted the 2018 Italian Basketball Supercup on 29 and 30 September 2018.

Since September 2018 the PalaLeonessa has been the home arena for the basketball club Germani Basket Brescia in LBA and EuroCup matches.

== See also ==
- List of indoor arenas in Italy
- List of basketball arenas

Preceded by Unieuro Arena; Forlì	Italian Basketball Supercup; Venue; 2018	Succeeded by TBD; TBD
