= Curtis Jerrells =

American basketball player (born 1987)

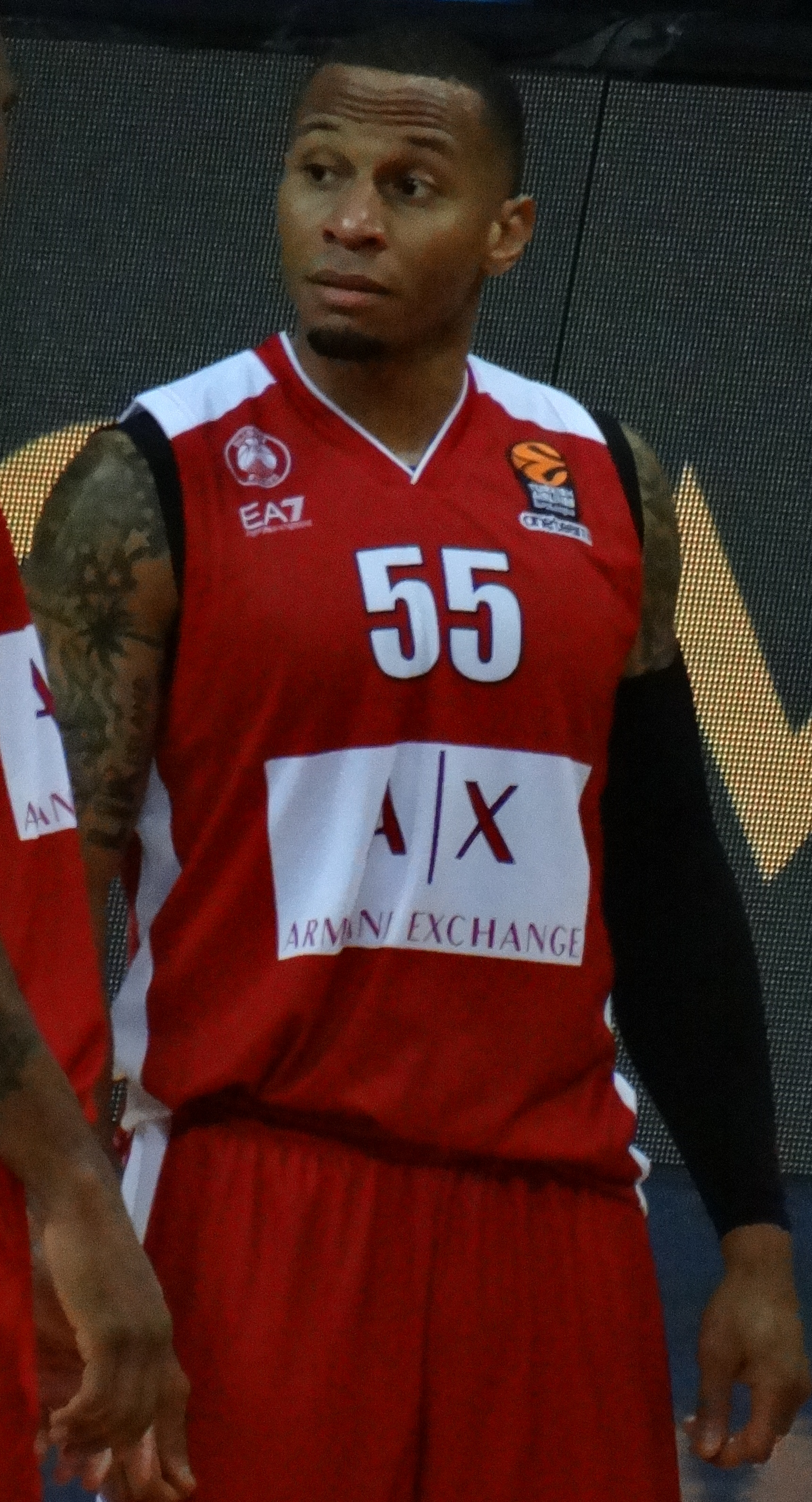
- Jerrells with Olimpia Milano in 2018

Personal information
- Born: February 5, 1987 (age 39) Austin, Texas, U.S.
- Listed height: 6 ft 1 in (1.85 m)
- Listed weight: 194 lb (88 kg)

Career information
- High school: Del Valle (Del Valle, Texas)
- College: Baylor (2005–2009)
- NBA draft: 2009: undrafted
- Playing career: 2009–2021
- Position: Point guard

Career history
- 2009–2010: Austin Toros
- 2010–2011: Partizan
- 2011–2012: Fenerbahçe Ülker
- 2012: →Murcia
- 2012–2013: Beşiktaş
- 2013: Maine Red Claws
- 2013–2014: Olimpia Milano
- 2014–2015: UNICS
- 2016: Galatasaray
- 2016–2017: Hapoel Jerusalem
- 2017–2019: Olimpia Milano
- 2019–2020: Dinamo Sassari
- 2021: Anwil Włocławek
- 2021: Reyer Venezia

Career highlights
- EuroCup champion (2016); All-EuroCup First Team (2017); LBA champion (2018); Israeli Super League champion (2017); Israeli Super League Quintet (2017); Israeli League Cup winner (2016); Israeli League Cup MVP (2016); LBA champion (2014, 2018); Serbian League Playoffs MVP (2011); Serbian League champion (2011); Adriatic League champion (2011); NBA Development League All-Star (2010); All-NBA D-League Third Team (2010); HM All Big 12 (2007), First team All Big 12 (2008), Third-team All-Big 12 (2009)
- Stats at NBA.com
- Stats at Basketball Reference

Curtis Louis Jerrells Jr. (born February 5, 1987) is an American former professional basketball player. Standing at 1.85 m (6 ft 1 in), he plays at the point guard position.

== High school ==
Jerrells was a four-year starter at Del Valle High School in his hometown, Austin, Texas.

== College career ==
Jerrells played college basketball at Baylor University. He was the first player in Bears history to lead the team in scoring and assists all four seasons. He became the second player in BU history with 1,000 points, 400 assists and 100 steals.

As a freshman, Jerrells started every game and led the team in scoring, assists, steals and minutes played. In his sophomore season, Jerrells again started every game and led the team in scoring, assists and minutes. He was named 2007 All-Big 12 honorable mention by league's coaches and media and was chosen to 2007 Big 12 Championship All-Tournament team.

As a junior, Jerrells was a consensus first team All-Big 12 selection. He again led the team in scoring, assists and minutes. In his last season of college basketball, Jerrells was named to the 2009 NIT All-Tournament Team, was a Lowe's Senior CLASS Award finalist and a 2009 All-Big 12 third team selection by the league's coaches. He again led the team in points, assists and minutes.

=== College career statistics ===
Year	Team	GP	MPG	APG	SPG	PPG
2005–06	Baylor	17	33.4	3.3	1.4	13.5
2006–07	Baylor	31	32.9	3.8	1.1	15.0
2007–08	Baylor	32	31.2	3.8	1.3	15.3
2008–09	Baylor	39	34.6	4.9	1.5	16.3

== Professional career ==
In September 2009, Jerrells signed for the San Antonio Spurs to their training camp roster. While he didn't make the team, the Spurs saw his potential and offered him a spot playing for their NBA Development League team, the Austin Toros. Jerrells was signed by the San Antonio Spurs on March 24, 2010, but immediately reassigned to their affiliate Austin Toros.

Jerrells played for the Spurs again in the NBA Summer League in 2010. His play during the 2010–11 preseason caught the eye of the New Orleans Hornets general manager Dell Demps, who previously worked as a scout and executive for the Spurs.

On October 18, 2010, Jerrells was traded to the New Orleans Hornets for a second round pick. However, he was waived just one week later at the end of training camp.

On November 27, 2010, he moved to Europe and signed a contract until the end of the 2010–11 season with the Serbian team Partizan Belgrade.

In June 2011, he signed a two-year contract with Fenerbahçe Ülker.

In March 2012, he signed a loan contract with the Spanish club Murcia for the rest of the season. After playing only for one week for the new club (two games), he broke his foot and missed the whole season.

On August 29, 2012, he signed a one-year contract with Beşiktaş.

In March 2013, Jerrells was signed by the Sioux Falls SkyForce and subsequently traded to the Maine Red Claws for center Chris Ayer.

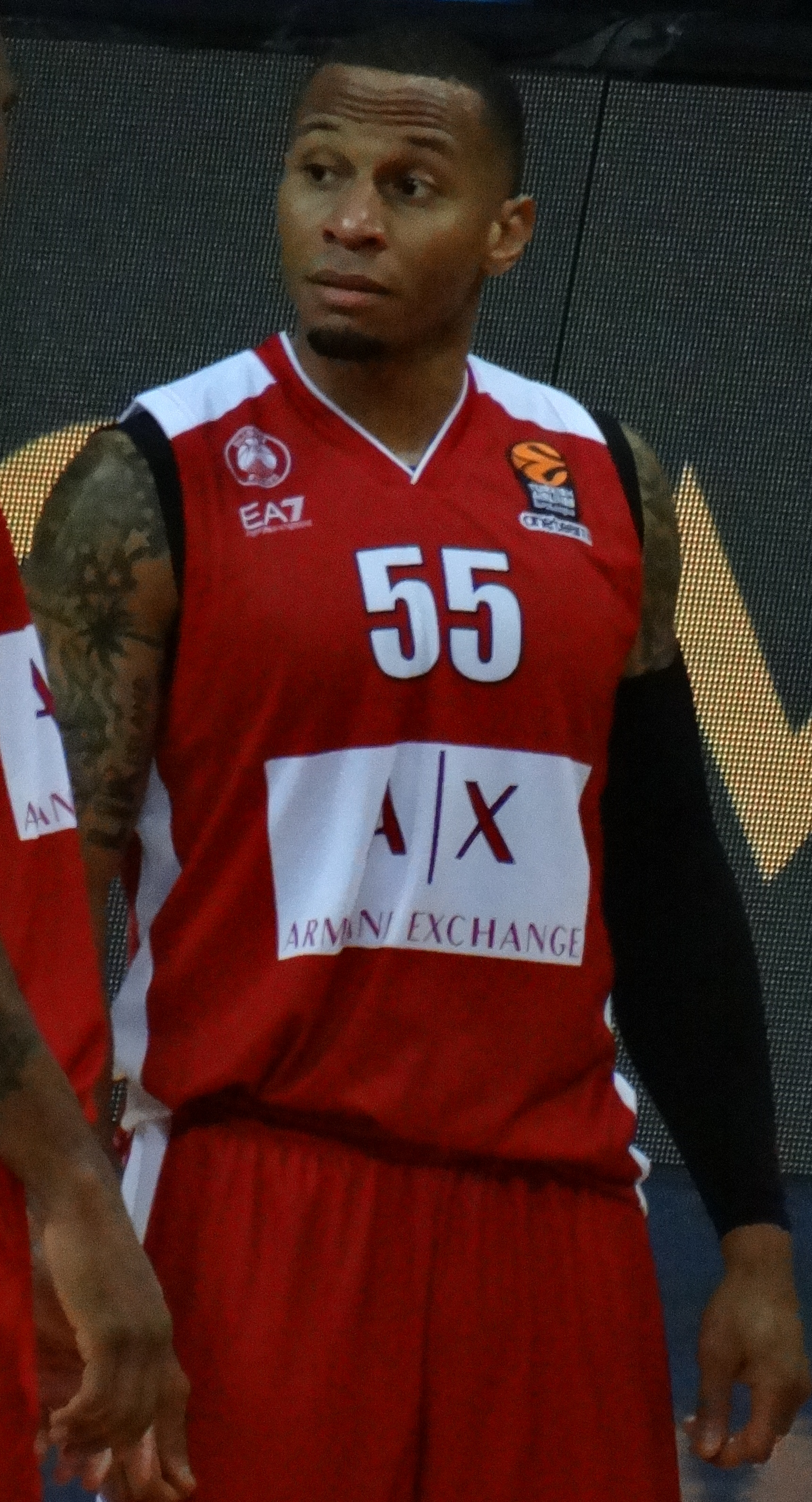
Jerrells with Olimpia Milano in 2018

In August 2013, Jerrells was signed by Olimpia Milano of the Italian Lega Basket Serie A.

On July 7, 2014, he signed a two-year deal with the Russian club UNICS Kazan.

On January 25, 2016, he signed with the Turkish club Galatasaray. On May 2, 2016, he parted ways with Galatasaray.

On July 10, 2016, Jerrells signed a two-year deal with Israeli club Hapoel Jerusalem. He helped Hapoel to win the Israeli League and Cup titles, as well as reaching the EuroCup semifinals. On July 8, 2017, Jerrells signed a two-year contract extension with Hapoel Jerusalem. On October 20, 2017, he was released by Hapoel, due to his conflict with coach Fotis Katsikaris.

On November 6, 2017, he returned to Olimpia Milano and signed a two-year deal. On July 1, 2019, Milano and Jerrells parted ways once more.

On August 1, 2019, Jerrells signed with Dinamo Sassari of the Italian Lega Basket Serie A (LBA). On March 3 he was replaced by Jaime Smith, the Sassari head coach, Gianmarco Pozzecco, explained that it was his decision based on technical choices.

On January 6, 2021, he signed in Poland for Anwil Włocławek.

At the end of the 2020–21 season he was hired back in Italy by Reyer Venezia for the 2021 LBA Playoffs. On August 16, 2021, Jerrells signed with Zamalek of the Egyptian Basketball Super League.

== Career statistics ==
Legend
GP	Games played	GS	Games started	MPG	Minutes per game
FG%	Field-goal percentage	3P%	3-point field-goal percentage	FT%	Free-throw percentage
RPG	Rebounds per game	APG	Assists per game	SPG	Steals per game
BPG	Blocks per game	PPG	Points per game	PIR	Performance index rating
**Bold**	Career high

=== Domestic Leagues ===
Year	Team	League	GP	MPG	FG%	3P%	FT%	RPG	APG	SPG	BPG	PPG
2009–10	(United States) Austin Toros	NBA D League	50	40.3	46.9%	37.6%	77.7%	4.5	5.7	1.9	0.2	20.7
2010–11	(Serbia) KK Partizan	Basketball League of Serbia	19	26.5	46.7%	38.7%	75.6%	2.3	4.1	1.9	0.1	12.1
2010–11	(Serbia) KK Partizan	ABA League	19	24.9	46.3%	34.6%	83.0%	3.3	2.2	1.9	0.9	12.4
2011–12	(Turkey) Fenerbahçe Ülker	Turkish Basketball League	17	18.5	37.5%	26.1%	60.0%	1.6	2.0	1.1	0.3	6.4
2011–12	(Spain) UCAM Murcia	Liga ACB	2	21.0	45.5%	50.0%	100%	1.5	0.5	1.0	0.0	7.5
2012–13	(Turkey) Beşiktaş	Turkish Basketball League	17	27.6	42.9%	42.9%	85.7%	2.6	3.0	1.1	0.1	12.1
2012–13	(United States) Maine Red Claws	NBA D League	10	37.5	46.3%	43.6%	66.7%	3.3	5.6	1.9	0.2	14.4
2013–14	(Italy) EA7 Emporio Armani Milano	Serie A	46	22.9	42.7%	38.8%	69.1%	2.0	1.8	0.9	0.1	8.5
2014–15	(Russia) UNICS Kazan	VTB United League	29	27.6	41.0%	37.9%	61.9%	2.9	4.0	1.0	0.1	9.8
2015–16	(Turkey) Galatasaray Odeabank	Basketball Super League	4	14.3	45.0%	50.0%	–	0.5	2.0	0.0	0.0	4.8
2016–17	(Israel) Hapoel Jerusalem	Israeli Basketball Premier League	32	30.9	39.4%	32.9%	79.8%	2.7	3.3	1.3	0.1	12.9
2017–18	(Israel) Hapoel Jerusalem	Israeli Basketball Premier League	2	31.0	35.7%	30.0%	40.0%	2.0	3.5	1.5	0.0	7.5
2017–18	(Italy) EA7 Emporio Armani Milano	Serie A	35	23.0	41.7%	36.9%	72.1%	1.9	3.0	0.7	0.0	9.9
2018–19	(Italy) AX Armani Exchange Milano	Serie A	27	22.9	45.2%	37.5%	83.7%	2.3	2.0	0.7	0.1	10.4
2018–19	(Italy) Banco di Sardegna Sassari	Serie A	20	21.6	36.1%	33.3%	69.4%	2.0	2.3	0.7	0.1	8.7

=== European Competitions ===
Year	Team	GP	GS	MPG	FG%	3P%	FT%	RPG	APG	SPG	BPG	PPG	PIR
2010–11 Euroleague	(Serbia) Partizan mt:s Belgrade	10	3	26.3	32.0%	13.2%	83.3%	3.2	3.8	1.3	0.1	9.7	10.3
2011–12 Euroleague	(Turkey) Fenerbahçe Ulker	14	3	21.0	41.8%	28.6%	84.8%	1.9	1.7	0.7	0.3	8.6	9.0
2012–13 Euroleague	(Turkey) Beşiktaş JK Istanbul	17	17	30.9	44.7%	38.5%	83.3%	2.6	2.9	1.1	0.1	14.2	14.1
2013–14 Euroleague	(Italy) EA7 Emporio Armani Milan	28	12	24.1	44.0%	42.1%	66.7%	2.3	2.5	0.7	0.0	11.3	10.2
2014–15 Euroleague	(Russia) UNICS	10	3	25.0	44.1%	34.0%	72.7%	2.6	2.9	0.5	0.2	10.6	9.1
2014–15 Eurocup	(Russia) UNICS	12	2	27.8	41.6%	28.8%	87.5%	2.3	0.9	0.9	0.1	10.0	8.8
2015–16 Eurocup	(Turkey) Galatasaray Odeabank Istanbul	11	0	12.7	39.0%	34.6%	75.0%	1.7	0.7	0.3	0.1	4.0	3.4
2016–17 Eurocup	(Israel) Hapoel Bank Yahav Jerusalem	19	19	34.4	48.5%	44.0%	78.3%	3.0	3.7	1.3	0.1	16.8	16.6
2017–18 Eurocup	(Israel) Hapoel Bank Yahav Jerusalem	2	2	32.6	46.1%	46.7%	100%	4.0	4.0	2.0	0.0	16.5	18.5
2017–18 EuroLeague	(Italy) AX Armani Exchange Olimpia Milan	24	2	20.6	44.5%	36.8%	80.0%	1.8	2.7	0.5	0.0	9.5	9.3
2018–19 EuroLeague	(Italy) AX Armani Exchange Olimpia Milan	30	0	15.0	38.7%	34.3%	75.0%	1.0	1.5	0.4	0.0	6.2	4.2
2019–20 Basketball Champions League	(Italy) Dinamo Sassari	14	0	21.7	36.7%	38.7%	72.2%	2.1	1.9	1.1	0.0	9.3	7.4
