= Jeff Brooks =

American-Italian basketball player

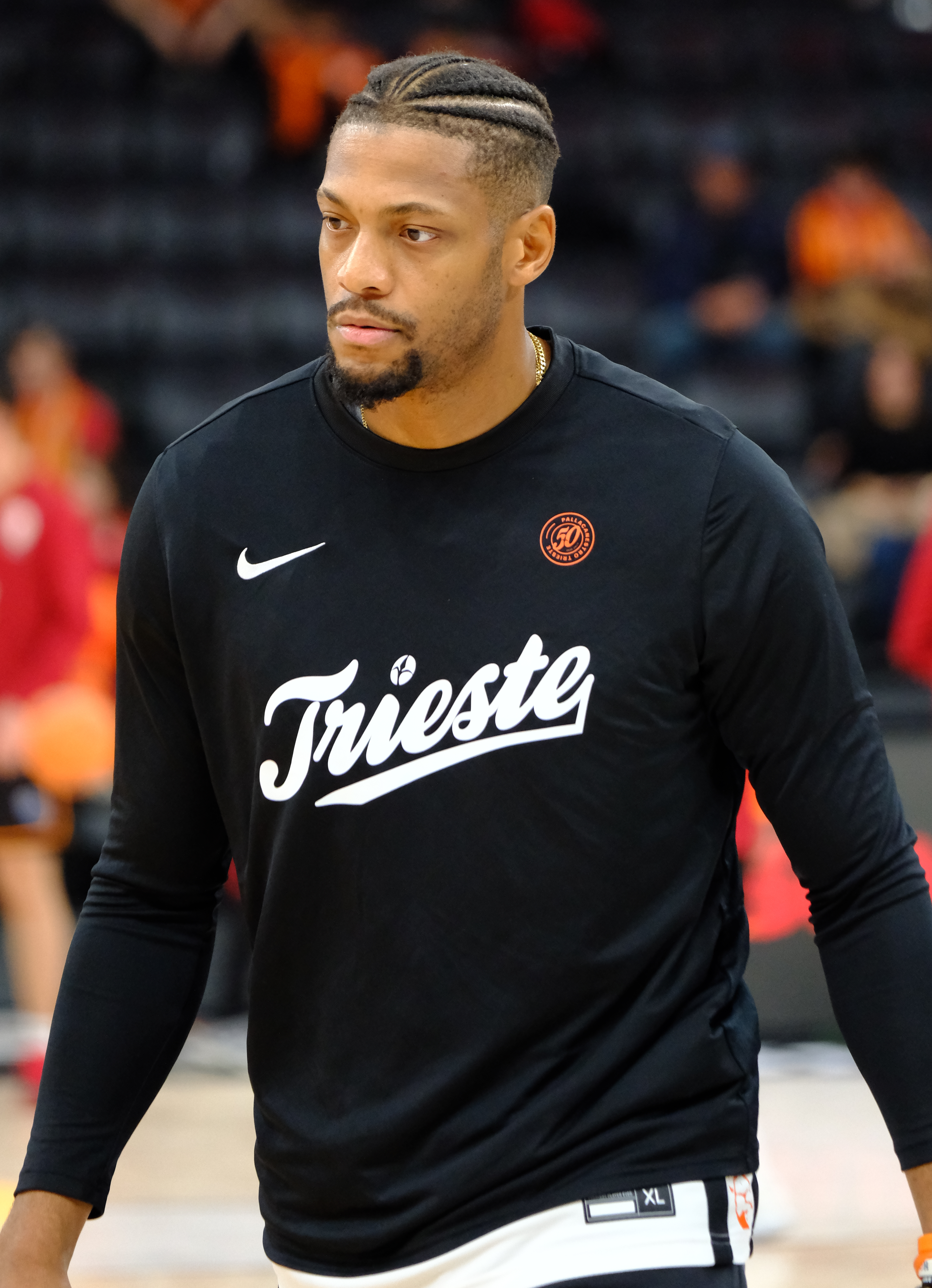
- Brooks with Pallacanestro Trieste in 2025

No. 23 – Dinamo Sassari
- Position: Power forward
- League: LBA

Personal information
- Born: June 12, 1989 (age 37) Louisville, Kentucky, U.S.
- Listed height: 2.03 m (6 ft 8 in)
- Listed weight: 100 kg (220 lb)

Career information
- High school: Doss (Louisville, Kentucky)
- College: Penn State (2007–2011)
- NBA draft: 2011: undrafted
- Playing career: 2011–present

Career history
- 2011–2012: Aurora Jesi
- 2012–2013: Cantù
- 2013–2014: Juvecaserta
- 2014–2015: Dinamo Sassari
- 2015–2016: Avtodor Saratov
- 2016–2018: Unicaja Malaga
- 2018–2021: Olimpia Milano
- 2021–2024: Reyer Venezia
- 2024–2026: Trieste
- 2026–present: Dinamo Sassari

Career highlights
- 2× Italian Cup winner (2015, 2021); 4× Italian Supercup winner (2012, 2014, 2018, 2020); EuroCup champion (2017); Italian Serie A champion (2015); Italian League All-Star (2014)

Jeff Brooks (born June 12, 1989) is an American-born naturalized Italian professional basketball player for Dinamo Sassari of the Italian Lega Basket Serie A (LBA). He also represents the Italian national team.

== College career ==
After playing high school basketball at Doss High School, in Louisville, Kentucky, Brooks played 4 seasons of college basketball at the Pennsylvania State University, with the Penn State Nittany Lions.

== Professional career ==
On July 20, 2011, he signed with Aurora Basket Jesi of the Italian Legadue Basket for the 2011–12 season.

On July 31, 2012, he signed with Pallacanestro Cantù for the 2012–13 season. With Cantù he won the Italian Supercup and played in the 2012–13 Euroleague.

On August 9, 2013, he signed with Juvecaserta Basket for the 2013–14 season. He was selected to play at the 2014 Serie A All-Star game.

On June 13, 2014, he signed a one-year deal with Dinamo Sassari. With Sassari, he won the Italian Serie A and the Italian Cup in 2015.

On July 17, 2015, he signed a two-year deal with Avtodor Saratov. After one season he left Saratov and signed a one-year deal with Spanish club Unicaja. In the 2016–17 season, Brooks won the EuroCup with Unicaja after beating Valencia BC in the Finals.

On June 25, 2018, Brooks signed a two-year deal with Italian club Olimpia Milano. On June 11, 2020, he announced he was returning to the team for a third season.

On July 1, 2021, Brooks, after three years, left Milano and signed a multi-year contract with rivals Reyer Venezia.

== Career statistics ==
=== Domestic Leagues ===
Year	Team	League	GP	MPG	FG%	3P%	FT%	RPG	APG	SPG	BPG	PPG
2011–12	(Italy) Fileni BPA Jesi	LegaDue	28	35.0	56.6%	40.9%	77.4%	6.9	0.9	1.7	0.4	17.0
2012–13	(Italy) Lenovo Cantù	Serie A	43	24.3	50.6%	32.7%	77.1%	4.9	0.9	0.7	0.7	7.9
2013–14	(Italy) Pasta Reggia Caserta	Serie A	30	31.4	55.1%	45.2%	77.0%	6.3	1.5	1.5	0.5	14.4
2014–15	(Italy) Banco di Sardegna Sassari	Serie A	21	28.3	44.4%	31.9%	81.6%	7.5	1.3	0.9	0.6	8.7
2015–16	(Russia) Avtodor Saratov	VTB United League	26	27.3	53.9%	41.9%	78.5%	5.8	2.2	1.2	0.3	11.0
2016–17	(Spain) Unicaja Málaga	Liga ACB	38	20.4	49.3%	27.5%	82.6%	4.0	1.0	0.6	0.3	6.9
2017–18	(Spain) Unicaja Málaga	Liga ACB	33	20.5	48.3%	37.8%	89.4%	4.3	0.9	0.5	0.2	8.5
2018–19	(Italy) AX Armani Exchange Milano	Serie A	35	22.5	55.0%	33.3%	78.7%	4.5	1.0	0.7	0.5	5.9

=== European Competitions ===
Year	Team	GP	GS	MPG	FG%	3P%	FT%	RPG	APG	SPG	BPG	PPG	PIR
2012–13 Euroleague	(Italy) Mapooro Cantù	10	3	23.5	36.7%	10.0%	55.6%	4.9	1.3	0.6	0.0	8.3	9.2
2014–15 Euroleague	(Italy) Dinamo Banco di Sardegna Sassari	8	8	29.1	52.8%	47.1%	76.9%	5.0	1.3	2.0	0.6	9.3	13.0
2015–16 Eurocup	(Russia) Avtodor Saratov	13	12	30.7	57.0%	38.5%	89.6%	8.2	2.4	1.2	0.5	13.1	21.3
2016–17 Eurocup	(Spain) Unicaja Málaga	22	21	22.7	45.1%	36.1%	71.4%	4.2	1.0	0.6	0.4	7.3	8.3
2017–18 Euroleague	(Spain) Unicaja Málaga	26	23	22.9	50.0%	39.5%	78.0%	4.3	1.0	0.6	0.4	8.8	9.8
2018–19 EuroLeague	(Italy) AX Armani Exchange Milano	29	29	25.1	50.0%	39.6%	83.3%	5.3	1.0	0.8	0.3	6.0	8.6

=== Italian national team ===
Year	Tournament	National Team	GP	GS	MPG	FG%	3P%	FT%	RPG	APG	SPG	BPG	PPG
2019	FIBA World Cup	Italy	5	0	17.0	56.2%	33.3%	66.7%	4.2	1.0	1.6	1.2	4.4

Legend
GP	Games played	GS	Games started	MPG	Minutes per game
FG%	Field-goal percentage	3P%	3-point field-goal percentage	FT%	Free-throw percentage
RPG	Rebounds per game	APG	Assists per game	SPG	Steals per game
BPG	Blocks per game	PPG	Points per game	PIR	Performance index rating
**Bold**	Career high

== Personal life ==
Brooks is married to an Italian woman and they have a son.

On September 6, 2018, Brooks became officially Italian. He got the Italian passport and he was registered to FIBA for the upcoming 2019 FIBA Basketball World Cup qualification against Poland and Hungary.

On June 29, 2024, he signed with Trieste of the Italian Lega Basket Serie A (LBA).
