= Nemanja Nedović =

Serbian basketball player (born 1991)

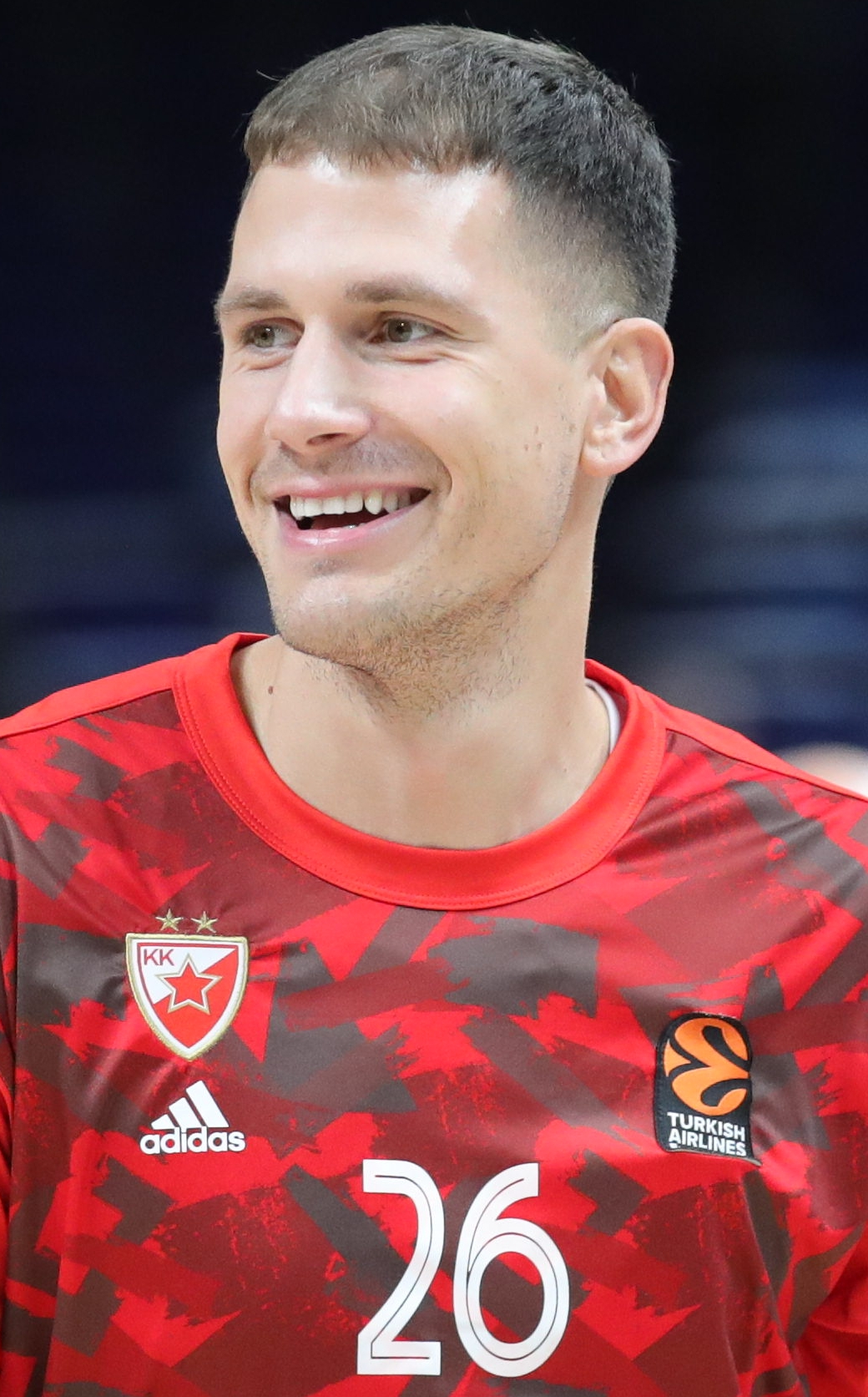
- Nedović with Crvena zvezda in 2022

No. 26 – Crvena zvezda Meridianbet
- Position: Shooting guard / small forward
- League: KLS; ABA League; EuroLeague

Personal information
- Born: 16 June 1991 (age 35) Nova Varoš, SR Serbia, SFR Yugoslavia
- Listed height: 1.93 m (6 ft 4 in)
- Listed weight: 88 kg (194 lb)

Career information
- NBA draft: 2013: 1st round, 30th overall pick
- Drafted by: Phoenix Suns
- Playing career: 2008–present

Career history
- 2008–2012: Crvena zvezda
- 2012–2013: Lietuvos rytas
- 2013–2014: Golden State Warriors
- 2013–2014: →Santa Cruz Warriors
- 2014–2015: Valencia
- 2015–2018: Unicaja Malaga
- 2018–2020: Olimpia Milano
- 2020–2022: Panathinaikos
- 2022–present: Crvena zvezda
- 2025–2026: →AS Monaco

Career highlights
- EuroCup champion (2017); LNB Élite champion (2026); ABA League champion (2024); Greek League champion (2021); 2× Serbian League champion (2023, 2024); Greek Cup winner (2021); Greek Cup Finals Top Scorer (2022); 3× Serbian Cup winner (2023–2025); Italian Supercup champion (2018); Greek Super Cup winner (2021); Lithuanian League All-Star (2013); All-Liga ACB Second Team (2017)
- Stats at NBA.com
- Stats at Basketball Reference
Medals
Men's basketball
Representing Serbia
Olympic Games
Silver medal – second place	2016 Rio de Janeiro	Team
FIBA World Cup
Silver medal – second place	2014 Spain
FIBA EuroBasket
Silver medal – second place	2009 Poland

Nemanja Nedović (Serbian Cyrillic: Немања Недовић; pronounced [němaɲa nêːdoʋitɕ]; born 16 June 1991) is a Serbian professional basketball player for Crvena zvezda of the Basketball League of Serbia (KLS), the ABA League, and the EuroLeague. He also represented the senior Serbian national basketball team internationally. Standing at 1.93 m (6 ft 4 in), he plays the shooting guard and small forward positions.

== Professional career ==
=== Crvena zvezda (2008–2012) ===
Nedović began to train in Italy with Ascoli basketball when he was 11 years of age. He lived there because his father was playing professional handball locally with the Ascoli Piceno Handball. After that, he trained for two years in Nova Varoš. In 2005, he moved to Crvena zvezda at the age of 15. He had success in the junior competition, as in 2008 when he became champion with the junior team of Crvena zvezda.

After that, he moved to the first team where he finally made a breakthrough professionally. In his first season with the team, he was scoring in double digits, forcing the team management to extend a contract with him for one more season. He stayed in the club until June 2012.

=== Lietuvos rytas (2012–2013) ===
In the summer of 2012, he signed a contract with the Lithuanian team Lietuvos rytas Vilnius. In his first EuroLeague season with Rytas he averaged 9.8 points, 2.5 rebounds and 2.1 assists per game.

=== Golden State Warriors (2013–2014) ===
On 27 June 2013, Nedović was selected with the 30th overall pick in the 2013 NBA draft by the Phoenix Suns. He was later traded to the Golden State Warriors on draft night. He is also the last draft pick called by David Stern in his career as a commissioner of the NBA. On 9 July 2013 he signed with the Warriors. During his rookie season, he had multiple assignments with the Santa Cruz Warriors of the NBA Development League.

In July 2014, Nedović joined the Warriors for the 2014 NBA Summer League where he averaged 9.4 points, 2.0 rebounds and 2.2 assists in five games. On 11 November 2014, he was waived by the Warriors.

=== Valencia Basket (2014–2015) ===
On 14 November 2014, Nedović signed a two-year deal with the Spanish team Valencia. Over five EuroLeague games he played for Valencia, he averaged 8 points and 3.6 assists per game. In July 2015, he parted ways with the team.

=== Unicaja Málaga (2015–2018) ===
On 2 July 2015, the day he parted ways with Valencia, he signed a one-year contract with Unicaja. On 30 May 2016 he signed a new two-year contract with the team. In April 2017, he won the EuroCup with Unicaja after beating Valencia BC in the Finals. On 7 June 2017 Nedović re-signed with Unicaja for the 2017–18 season. On 27 June 2018 Nedović officially left Unicaja after 3 years.

=== Olimpia Milano (2018–2020) ===
On 27 June 2018 Nedović signed a multi-year deal with the Italian club Olimpia Milano.

=== Panathinaikos (2020–2022) ===
On 13 July 2020 Nedović signed with Panathinaikos of the Greek Basket League and the EuroLeague. In 10 league games during the 2020-2021 campaign, he averaged 14.8 points, 1.4 rebounds and 2.9 assists, playing around 21 minutes per contest. Additionally, in 25 EuroLeague games, he averaged 16 points (shooting with 51% from the field, 37% from the 3-point line, and 84% from the free-throw line), 1.9 rebounds and 3.7 assists, playing around 26 minutes per contest.

On 5 July 2021 Nedović officially renewed his contract with the Greek club for another two years. In 26 league games during the 2021-2022 campaign, he averaged 14.4 points, 2.3 rebounds and 2.6 assists, playing around 23 minutes per contest. Additionally, in 26 EuroLeague games, he averaged 14.3 points (shooting with 53% from the field, 39% from the 3-point line, and 85% from the free-throw line), 2.2 rebounds and 3.2 assists, playing around 24 minutes per contest.

=== Return to Crvena zvezda (2022–present) ===
On 7 July 2022, Nedović officially returned to Crvena zvezda after ten years abroad, signing a three-year contract.

On 4 June 2025, he agreed to a new two-year contract (with pay cut) with Crvena zvezda.

==== Loan to AS Monaco (2025–2026) ====
During the summer, he reportedly parted ways with the club. However, that was not the case since Nedović did not in fact part ways with Crvena zvezda. Instead, he was loaned out to AS Monaco for the 2025–2026 season, where he helped the team win the 2026 French championship.

As of 28 June 2026, Nedović is still under contract with Crvena zvezda which he confirmed according to EuroHoops.

== National team career ==
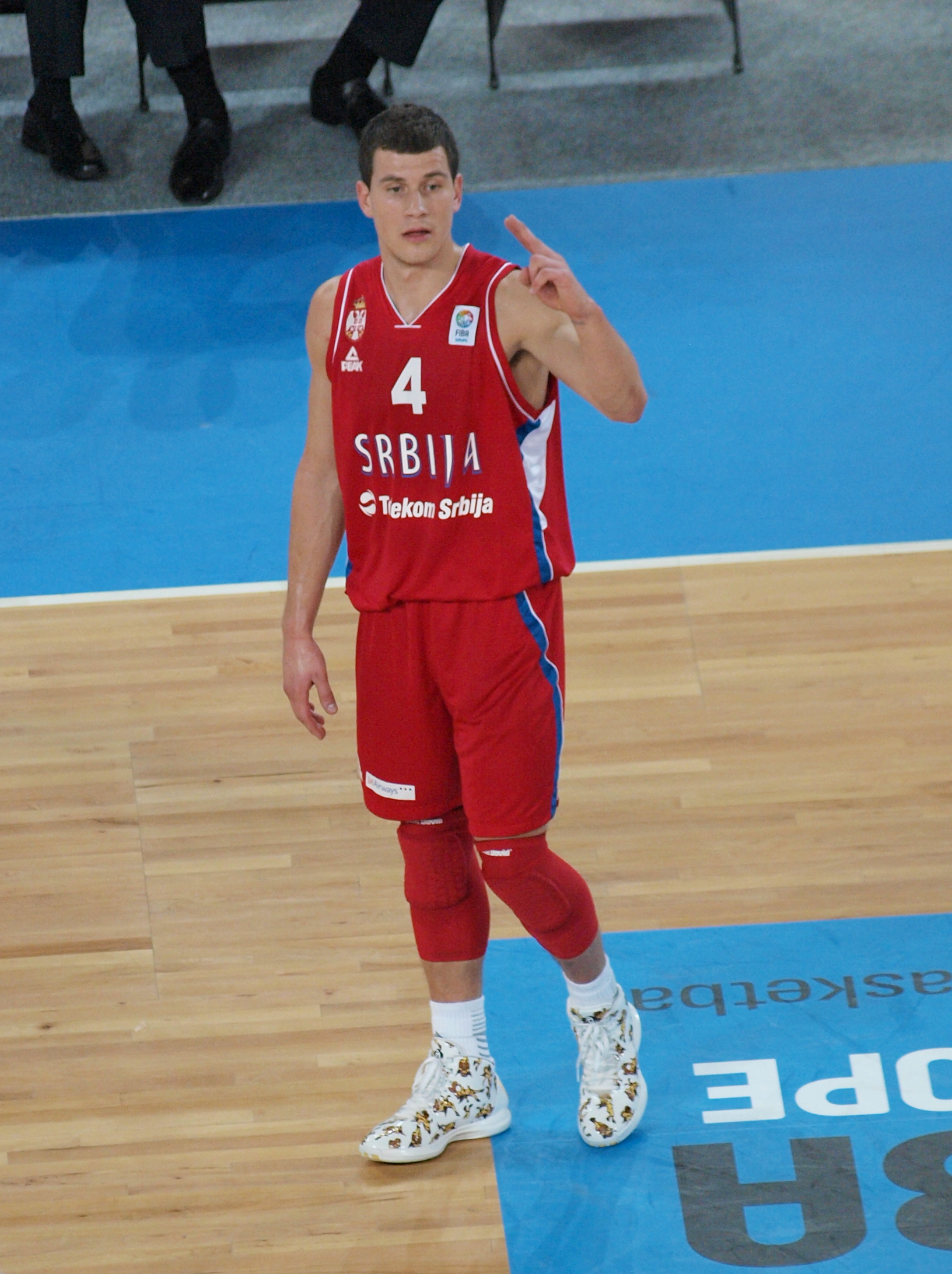
Nedović playing for Serbia at EuroBasket 2013

Nedović was a member of U20 Serbia national basketball team in 2009, 2010, and 2011 at FIBA Europe Under-20 Championship. In 2012, he played with Serbia men's national basketball team at FIBA EuroBasket 2013 qualification. During Eurobasket 2013, Nedović's game saw many ups and downs as he led a very young and inexperienced, but nonetheless talented Serbia team, showing great performances against Lithuania and particularly France in a 77–65 blowout, in which he outplayed one of his role models, Tony Parker, scoring 17 points on 5/8 shooting for three. Serbia ended up being swept easily by Spain in the quarterfinals as Nedović and the entire Serbia team struggled offensively.

He represented Serbia once again at the EuroBasket 2015 under head coach Aleksandar Đorđević, after missing the 2014 World Cup. In the first phase of the tournament, Serbia dominated in the toughest Group B with 5–0 record, and then eliminated Finland and Czech Republic in the round of 16 and quarterfinal game, respectively. However, they were stopped in the semifinal game by Lithuania with 67–64, and eventually lost to the host team France in the bronze-medal game with 81–68. Over 9 tournament games, Nedović averaged 8.4 points, 2.6 rebounds and 2.4 assists per game on 52% shooting from the field.

Nedović also represented Serbia at the 2016 Summer Olympics where they won the silver medal, after losing to the United States in the final game with 96–66.

== Player profile ==
Nedović's strong points are his ball-handling skills and athleticism, as he proved to be among of the high tier athletes in European basketball. He is known for an excellent first step and can play easily above the rim. He was labeled during the 2013 NBA draft as "The European Derrick Rose" by some ESPN analysts because of his athleticism, explosiveness, versatility, similar size, and ability to play both guard positions. After he was drafted by the Golden State Warriors, Mark Jackson, the team coach, has said that Nedović "is a very good athlete with highly deceptive speed."

== Career statistics ==
Legend
GP	Games played	GS	Games started	MPG	Minutes per game
FG%	Field-goal percentage	3P%	3-point field-goal percentage	FT%	Free-throw percentage
RPG	Rebounds per game	APG	Assists per game	SPG	Steals per game
BPG	Blocks per game	PPG	Points per game	PIR	Performance index rating
**Bold**	Career high

=== EuroLeague ===
Year	Team	GP	GS	MPG	FG%	3P%	FT%	RPG	APG	SPG	BPG	PPG	PIR
2012–13	Lietuvos rytas	10	5	23.2	.367	.343	.700	**2.5**	2.1	.8	**.2**	9.8	6.8
2014–15	Valencia	5	2	19.2	.405	.400	**1.000**	1.0	3.6	**1.4**	**.2**	8.0	7.0
2015–16	Málaga	23	8	15.1	.391	.279	.750	.8	1.9	.3	.1	7.4	4.8
2017–18	Málaga	24	**18**	25.1	.429	.358	.845	2.0	**4.8**	.6	.1	**16.8**	**16.7**
2018–19	Olimpia Milano	15	7	23.5	.461	**.414**	.806	**2.5**	2.7	.8	.1	11.5	10.4
2019–20	Olimpia Milano	17	3	16.5	.373	.343	.829	1.2	1.7	.3	.1	7.9	6.2
2020–21	Panathinaikos	25	13	**26.1**	.428	.370	.835	1.9	3.7	.7	**.2**	16.0	14.9
2021–22	Panathinaikos	26	11	23.6	.447	.386	.853	2.2	3.2	.5	.1	14.3	13.2
2022–23	Crvena zvezda	27	4	20.9	.390	.280	.860	1.2	2.9	.7	.0	13.3	11.2
2023–24	Crvena zvezda	30	15	21.8	**.484**	.408	.868	1.9	2.6	.5	.1	14.3	12.9
2024–25	Crvena zvezda	27	11	18.6	.427	.391	.812	1.4	2.9	.5	.1	9.2	8.3
2025–26	Monaco	**35**	8	13.5	.465	.408	.867	1.2	1.4	.5	.1	6.1	5.0
Career		264	105	20.3	.425	.363	.837	1.6	2.7	.6	.1	11.5	10.1

=== EuroCup ===
Year	Team	GP	GS	MPG	FG%	3P%	FT%	RPG	APG	SPG	BPG	PPG	PIR
2008–09	Crvena zvezda	2	0	5.0	.333	**1.000**	.500	1.0	—	—	—	3.0	1.0
2009–10	Crvena zvezda	5	0	3.2	**.500**	.000	.500	.4	.2	.2	—	0.6	0.2
2014–15	Valencia	8	3	16.6	.370	.300	**.778**	1.8	**3.8**	**.8**	—	7.5	7.4
2016–17	Málaga	**16**	**15**	**20.6**	.357	.243	.744	**1.9**	3.5	.6	**.4**	**9.3**	**8.8**
Career		31	18	15.8	.361	.261	.738	1.5	2.8	.5	.2	7.0	6.5

=== NBA ===
==== Regular season ====
Year	Team	GP	GS	MPG	FG%	3P%	FT%	RPG	APG	SPG	BPG	PPG
2013–14	Golden State	24	0	5.9	.205	.167	.875	.6	.5	—	.0	1.1
Career		24	0	5.9	.205	.167	.875	.6	.5	—	.0	1.1

==== Playoffs ====
Year	Team	GP	GS	MPG	FG%	3P%	FT%	RPG	APG	SPG	BPG	PPG
2014	Golden State	1	0	0.0	—	—	—	—	—	—	—	0.0
Career		1	0	0.0	—	—	—	—	—	—	—	0.0

=== Domestic leagues ===
Year	Team	League	GP	MPG	FG%	3P%	FT%	RPG	APG	SPG	BPG	PPG
2008–09	(Serbia) Crvena zvezda	KLS	1	2.0	.000	.000	.000	—	—	—	—	0.0
2008–09	(Serbia) Crvena zvezda	ABA	1	1.0	—	—	—	—	—	—	—	0.0
2009–10	(Serbia) Crvena zvezda	KLS	16	16.4	.444	.292	.771	1.4	1.9	1.6	.7	5.6
2009–10	(Serbia) Crvena zvezda	ABA	15	8.3	.419	.167	.765	.7	.8	.6	—	2.7
2010–11	(Serbia) Crvena zvezda	KLS	14	28.1	.478	.347	.908	1.9	4.0	.7	.1	16.4
2010–11	(Serbia) Crvena zvezda	ABA	25	23.0	.425	.286	.673	1.6	2.5	1.4	.1	10.8
2011–12	(Serbia) Crvena zvezda	KLS	19	14.4	.429	.311	.676	1.2	1.1	.7	.1	6.5
2011–12	(Serbia) Crvena zvezda	ABA	22	17.8	.454	.216	.724	1.5	1.3	.6	—	6.7
2013–14	(United States) Santa Cruz Warriors	D-League	15	28.5	.400	.299	.857	2.5	4.2	.9	.3	14.9
2012–13	(Lithuania) Lietuvos rytas	LKL	18	21.3	.496	.390	.787	2.4	3.8	1.2	.2	11.1
2012–13	(Lithuania) Lietuvos rytas	VTBUL	17	21.6	.436	.424	.778	2.4	2.5	1.2	.2	10.3
2014–15	(Spain) Valencia	ACB	32	15.2	.433	.356	.719	1.3	1.8	.6	.2	7.2
2015–16	(Spain) Málaga	ACB	35	18.6	.426	.364	.824	1.1	2.6	.7	.1	11.2
2016–17	(Spain) Málaga	ACB	31	20.6	.520	.424	.849	1.5	3.4	.5	.1	13.5
2017–18	(Spain) Málaga	ACB	34	21.8	.416	.363	.846	1.4	3.8	.6	.1	13.5
2018–19	(Italy) Olimpia Milano	LBA	17	20.2	.414	.410	.694	2.6	2.7	1.0	.1	11.3
2019–20	(Italy) Olimpia Milano	LBA	10	20.7	.409	.365	.931	2.7	2.6	.9	—	12.2
2020–21	(Greece) Panathinaikos	GBL	10	21.2	.565	.559	.905	1.4	2.9	.5	.1	14.8
2021–22	(Greece) Panathinaikos	GBL	26	22.8	.423	.346	.817	2.3	2.6	.6	.1	14.4
2022–23	(Serbia) Crvena zvezda	KLS	2	20.7	.571	.500	1.000	1.5	3.0	1.0	—	12.0
2022–23	(Serbia) Crvena zvezda	ABA	29	19.3	.425	.365	.915	1.3	2.3	.5	.0	11.7
2023–24	(Serbia) Crvena zvezda	KLS	3	22.9	.400	.450	.667	1.0	3.0	.3	—	13.7
2023–24	(Serbia) Crvena zvezda	ABA	27	22.4	.419	.309	.788	2.0	4.1	.7	.1	12.7

== See also ==
- List of Olympic medalists in basketball
- List of Serbian NBA players
