= 2018 Italian Basketball Supercup =

2018 Zurich Connect Supercoppa
Tournament details
- Arena: PalaLeonessa; Brescia, Italy
- Dates: 29 September 2018–30 September 2018

Final positions
- Champions: AX Armani Exchange Milano (3rd title)
- Runners-up: Fiat Torino

Awards and statistics
- MVP: (Serbia) Vladimir Micov

The 2018 Italian Basketball Supercup (Italian: Supercoppa di pallacanestro 2018), also known as Zurich Connect Supercoppa 2018 for sponsorship reasons, was the 24th edition of the super cup tournament, organized by the Lega Basket Serie A (LBA).

AX Armani Exchange Milano were the defending champions.

AX Armani Exchange Milano went to win his 3rd Supercup by beating Fiat Torino 82–71 in the Finals. Vladimir Micov was named MVP of the competition.

It was played in the PalaLeonessa in Brescia on 29 and 30 September 2018.

== Participant teams ==
As of 3 June 2018, qualified for the tournament were Fiat Torino and Germani Brescia, as Italian Cup finalists, AX Armani Exchange Milano and Dolomiti Energia Trento as LBA Playoffs finalist.

Team	Qualified as	Appearances
Dolomiti Energia Trento	LBA runner-up	2nd
AX Armani Exchange Milano	LBA champion	2nd
Fiat Torino	Italian Cup champion	1st
Germani Basket Brescia	Italian Cup runner-up	1st

== Bracket ==
Semifinals; 29 September
AX Armani Exchange Milano	81
Germani Basket Brescia	59
Fiat Torino	81
Dolomiti Energia Trento	72

Final; 30 September
AX Armani Exchange Milano	82
Fiat Torino	71

== Semifinals ==
=== Fiat Torino vs. Dolomiti Energia Trento ===
29 September 2018	Fiat Torino	81–72	Dolomiti Energia Trento	Brescia
18:00 (CEST)	Scoring by quarter: 19–11, 21–19, 15–22, 26–20
Eurosport	Pts: Cotton 21; Rebs: Wilson 8 Asts: Poeta 6 PIR: Wilson 24	Boxscore	Pts: Jovanović 15; Rebs: Jovanović 8 Asts: Flaccadori 6 PIR: Jovanović 18	Arena: PalaLeonessa; Referees: Tolga Sahin, Maurizio Biggi, Gabriele Bettini

Starters:			Pts	Reb	Ast
PG	15	(United States) Tyshawn Taylor	15	4	3
SG	32	(United States) Tekele Cotton	21	2	0
SF	0	(United States) Jamil Wilson	16	8	2
PF	1	(United States) Victor Rudd	0	7	1
C	14	(United States) James Michael McAdoo	14	6	0
Reserves:					
SG	3	(Italy) Simon Anumba	0	0	1
SG	4	(United States) Tony Carr	7	3	4
PG	6	(Italy) Vincenzo Guaiana	DNP		
PG	8	(Italy) Giuseppe Poeta	8	1	6
SF	10	(Argentina) Carlos Delfino	DNP		
C	12	(Italy) Marco Cusin	0	0	1
SF	19	(Italy) Simone Marrone	DNP		
Head coach:
(United States) Larry Brown

Fiat Torino	Dolomiti Energia Trento

Starters:			Pts	Reb	Ast
PG	4	(Serbia) Nikola Radičević	0	2	5
SG	12	(Italy) Diego Flaccadori	11	4	6
SF	15	(Portugal) João Gomes	9	2	0
PF	22	(United States) Dustin Hogue	9	2	1
C	32	(Serbia) Nikola Jovanović	15	8	0
Reserves:					
SG	1	(United States) Devyn Marble	6	0	1
PF	7	(Italy) Davide Pascolo	DNP		
SG	9	(Italy) Fabio Mian	3	1	0
PG	10	(Italy) Andrés Pablo Forray	14	3	1
PF	14	(Italy) Andrea Mezzanotte	9	2	1
G	20	(Italy) Alessandro Voltolini	DNP		
Head coach:
(Italy) Maurizio Buscaglia

=== AX Armani Exchange Milano vs. Germani Basket Brescia ===
29 September 2018	AX Armani Exchange Milano	81–59	Germani Basket Brescia	Brescia
20:45 (CEST)	Scoring by quarter: 20–13, 15–17, 23–11, 23–18
Eurosport	Pts: Nedović 23; Rebs: Gudaitis 11; Asts: Nedović 7 PIR: Nedović 31	Boxscore	Pts: Abass 15; Rebs: Hamilton 10; Asts: Vitali 9 PIR: Hamilton 20	Arena: PalaLeonessa; Referees: Massimiliano Filippini, Alessandro Vicino, Luca Weidmann

Starters:			Pts	Reb	Ast
PG	16	(Serbia) Nemanja Nedović	23	4	7
SG	2	(United States) Mike James	17	2	4
SF	19	(Lithuania) Mindaugas Kuzminskas	7	3	3
PF	32	(Italy) Jeff Brooks	2	9	0
C	7	(Lithuania) Artūras Gudaitis	9	11	2
Reserves:					
SG	00	(Italy) Amedeo Della Valle	5	0	2
SF	5	(Serbia) Vladimir Micov	12	5	1
G	6	(Italy) Riccardo Musumeci	DNP		
SG	9	(Latvia) Dairis Bertāns	0	1	0
SF	13	(Italy) Simone Fontecchio	0	1	0
PG	20	(Italy) Andrea Cinciarini	3	1	3
PF	23	(Italy) Christian Burns	3	6	0
Head coach:
(Italy) Simone Pianigiani

AX Armani Exchange Milano	Germani Basket Brescia

Starters:			Pts	Reb	Ast
PG	0	(United States) Bryon Allen	9	0	1
PG	7	(Italy) Luca Vitali	0	0	0
SG	5	(Italy) Awudu Abass	15	2	0
SF	1	(United States) Jordan Hamilton	14	10	1
C	12	(United States) Eric Mika	7	3	0
Reserves:					
SG	4	(Italy) Marco Ceron	0	2	0
PG	8	(Italy) Tommaso Laquintana	0	0	0
SG	10	(Italy) Matteo Caroli	DNP		
SF	18	(United States) Gerald Beverly	2	1	0
C	29	(Italy) Andrea Zerini	1	3	0
SF	20	(United States) David Moss	3	3	1
PF	29	(Italy) Brian Sacchetti	3	2	1
Head coach:
(Italy) Andrea Diana

== Final ==
=== Fiat Torino vs. AX Armani Exchange Milano ===
30 September 2018	Fiat Torino	71–82	AX Armani Exchange Milano	Brescia
18:00 (CEST)	Scoring by quarter: 21–20, 10–21, 20–26, 20–15
Eurosport	Pts: Carr 15; Rebs: Wilson 7 Asts: Carr, Poeta 4 PIR: Carr 21	Boxscore	Pts: Micov, Gudaitis 17; Rebs: Gudaitis 10; Asts: James 4 PIR: Gudaitis 23	Arena: PalaLeonessa; Referees: Massimiliano Filippini, Gabriele Bettini, Alessandro Vicino

Starters:			Pts	Reb	Ast
PG	15	(United States) Tyshawn Taylor	11	3	2
SG	32	(United States) Tekele Cotton	11	3	3
SF	0	(United States) Jamil Wilson	11	7	2
PF	1	(United States) Victor Rudd	5	3	0
C	14	(United States) James Michael McAdoo	12	6	2
Reserves:					
SG	3	(Italy) Simon Anumba	DNP		
SG	4	(United States) Tony Carr	15	5	4
PG	6	(Italy) Vincenzo Guaiana	0	0	0
PG	8	(Italy) Giuseppe Poeta	2	1	4
SF	10	(Argentina) Carlos Delfino	DNP		
C	12	(Italy) Marco Cusin	4	4	1
SF	19	(Italy) Simone Marrone	DNP		
Head coach:
(United States) Larry Brown

Fiat Torino	AX Armani Exchange Milano

Italian Supercoppa MVP
(Serbia) Vladimir Micov
Game rules
Game was played under FIBA rules.

2018 Italian Supercup Winners

AX Armani Exchange Milano
(3rd title)

Starters:			Pts	Reb	Ast
PG	16	(Serbia) Nemanja Nedović	14	3	3
SG	2	(United States) Mike James	10	3	4
SF	19	(Lithuania) Mindaugas Kuzminskas	4	7	3
PF	32	(Italy) Jeff Brooks	5	3	2
C	7	(Lithuania) Artūras Gudaitis	17	10	1
Reserves:					
SG	00	(Italy) Amedeo Della Valle	9	1	0
SF	5	(Serbia) Vladimir Micov	17	2	1
G	6	(Italy) Riccardo Musumeci	DNP		
SG	9	(Latvia) Dairis Bertāns	0	0	0
SF	13	(Italy) Simone Fontecchio	2	0	0
PG	20	(Italy) Andrea Cinciarini	2	3	3
PF	23	(Italy) Christian Burns	2	6	0
Head coach:
(Italy) Simone Pianigiani

== Sponsors ==
- Zurich Connect (title sponsor)
- PosteMobile (main sponsor)
- Panasonic (main sponsor and timekeeper)
- Turkish Airlines (official partner)
- Fastweb (technology partner)
- Molten (official ball)
- Contadi Castaldi Franciacorta (wine partner)
- MyGlass (official partner)
- Novotel (official hotel)
- Prozis (official nutrition partner)
- Anthea Risk Management (official partner)
- Viva Ticket (official ticketing provider)
- Eurosport (official broadcaster)
- Giornale di Brescia (press partner)
- Lombardy Region
- City of Brescia
