= 2016 Israeli Basketball League Cup =

Israeli basketball pre-season tournament

Tournament details
- Arena: Ein Sara Sport Hall; Nahariya
- Dates: 26 September–1 October 2016

Final positions
- Champions: Hapoel Jerusalem (4th title)
- Runners-up: Maccabi Tel Aviv

Awards and statistics
- MVP: (United States) Curtis Jerrells

The 2016 Israeli Basketball League Cup, for sponsorships reasons the Winner League Cup, was the 11th edition of the pre-season tournament of the Israeli Basketball Super League. Hapoel Jerusalem won the title for the fourth time after beating Maccabi Tel Aviv 77–62 in the Final. Curtis Jerrells was named tournament MVP. The tournament was hosted at the Ein Sara Sport Hall in Nahariya.

== Bracket ==
Quarterfinals; 26–27 September
Maccabi Rishon LeZion	79
Maccabi Haifa	58
Hapoel Jerusalem	65
Hapoel Tel Aviv	63
Maccabi Tel Aviv	77
Bnei Herzliya	74
Ironi Nahariya	69
Hapoel Eilat	50

Semifinals; 29 September
Maccabi Rishon LeZion	81
Hapoel Jerusalem	93
Maccabi Tel Aviv	99
Ironi Nahariya	69

Final; 1 October
Hapoel Jerusalem	77
Maccabi Tel Aviv	62

=== Final ===
21 May 2017	Hapoel Jerusalem	77–62	Maccabi Tel Aviv	Nahariya
20:10	Scoring by quarter: 24–13, 14–22, 24–12, 15–15
	Pts: Jerrells 19; Rebs: Eliyahu 9 Asts: Eliyahu, Jerrells 5 PIR: Jerrells 24	Boxscore	Pts: Weems 16; Rebs: Weems, Zirbes 7 Asts: Ohayon 6 PIR: Zirbes 18	Arena: Ein Sara Sport Hall; Attendance: 2,500; Referees: David Romano, Kfir Mualem, Ofer Manheim
