= Eurocup 2013–14 Regular Season Group C =

Standings and Results for Group C of the Regular Season phase of the 2013–14 Eurocup basketball tournament.

== Standings ==
	Team	Pld	W	L	PF	PA	Diff	Tie-break
1.	(Slovenia) Union Olimpija	10	7	3	743	698	+45	1–1 (+10)
2.	(Germany) Ratiopharm Ulm	10	7	3	761	745	+16	1–1 (–10)
3.	(Spain) Valencia BC	10	6	4	875	721	+154	
4.	(France) Paris-Levallois Basket	10	4	6	687	733	–46	2–0
5.	(France) ASVEL	10	4	6	706	794	–88	0–2
6.	(Italy) Cimberio Varese	10	2	8	730	811	–81	

Source: Euroleague Basketball

== Fixtures and results ==
=== Game 1 ===
15 October 2013
20:30 CET

Boxscore

Paris-Levallois Basket (France)	68–85	(Spain) Valencia BC
Scoring by quarter: 10–19, 19–26, 22–21, 17–19
Pts: Ewing, Onianque 10; Rebs: Sané 6 Asts: Albicy 8		Pts: Lafayette 17; Rebs: Dubljević 6 Asts: Lafayette 8

Palais des sports Marcel-Cerdan, Paris
Attendance: 1,500
Referees: Grzegorz Ziemblicki (POL), Robert Vyklicky (CZE), Gintaras Vitkauskas (LTU)

16 October 2013
19:30 CET

Boxscore

ratiopharm Ulm (Germany)	86–80	(France) ASVEL Basket
Scoring by quarter: 18–16, 17–21, 18–18, 33–25
Pts: Plaisted 16; Rebs: Plaisted 12; Asts: Long 5		Pts: Jackson 23; Rebs: Sy 6 Asts: Wright 7

Ratiopharm arena, Ulm
Attendance: 4,700
Referees: Fernando Rocha (POR), Milos Koljensic (MNE), Nick van den Broeck (BEL)

16 October 2013
20:30 CET

Boxscore

Union Olimpija (Slovenia)	67–59	(Italy) Cimberio Varese
Scoring by quarter: 16–18, 14–16, 16–14, 21–11
Pts: Salin 15; Rebs: Stepheson 12; Asts: Gailius 5		Pts: Clark 12; Rebs: Hassell 9 Asts: De Nicolao 4

Arena Stožice, Ljubljana
Attendance: 1,500
Referees: Emilio Perez Pizarro (ESP), Miguel Angel Perez Niz (ESP), Moritz Reiter (GER)

=== Game 2 ===
23 October 2013
20:00 CET

Boxscore

ASVEL Basket (France)	64–56	(Slovenia) Union Olimpija
Scoring by quarter: 20–10, 16–18, 16–14, 18–14
Pts: Wright, Jackson 12; Rebs: Sy 8 Asts: Morlende, Jackson 4		Pts: Gailius 18; Rebs: Gailius, Stepheson 6 Asts: Joksimović 4

L'Astroballe, Villeurbanne
Attendance: 5,247
Referees: Luis Lopes (POR), Francisco Arana (ESP), Renaud Geller (BEL)

23 October 2013
20:30 CET

Boxscore

Cimberio Varese (Italy)	77–71	(France) Paris-Levallois Basket
Scoring by quarter: 24–15, 24–15, 21–24, 8–17
Pts: Clark 21; Rebs: Hassell 11; Asts: Ere 5		Pts: Anagonye 15; Rebs: Anagonye, Oniangue 8 Asts: Ewing 8

PalaWhirlpool, Varese
Attendance: 3,383
Referees: Borys Ryzhyk (UKR), Antonio Conde (ESP), Milija Vojinovic (SRB)

23 October 2013
20:30 CET

Boxscore

Valencia BC (Spain)	88–74	(Germany) ratiopharm Ulm
Scoring by quarter: 30–20, 19–20, 18–12, 21–22
Pts: Van Rossom 19; Rebs: Doellman 7 Asts: Martínez 7		Pts: Plaisted 16; Rebs: Plaisted 8 Asts: Three players 3

Pabellón Fuente San Luis, Valencia
Attendance: 6,500
Referees: Elias Koromilas (GRE), Nicola Maestre (FRA), Tomas Jasevicius (LTU)

=== Game 3 ===
29 October 2013
20:30 CET

Boxscore

Paris-Levallois Basket (France)	68–78	(Germany) ratiopharm Ulm
Scoring by quarter: 24–16, 9–27, 18–15, 17–20
Pts: Williams 22; Rebs: Williams 8 Asts: Ewing 4		Pts: Schwethelm 12; Rebs: Plaisted 8 Asts: Long 6

Palais des sports Marcel-Cerdan, Paris
Attendance: 1,000
Referees: Marcin Kowalski (POL), Petri Mantyla (FIN), Renaud Geller (BEL)

30 October 2013
20:30 CET

Boxscore

Cimberio Varese (Italy)	78–85	(France) ASVEL Basket
Scoring by quarter: 19–22, 18–29, 20–16, 21–18
Pts: Coleman 23; Rebs: Hassell 11; Asts: Clark 4		Pts: Jackson 15; Rebs: Jackson 8 Asts: Jackson 6

PalaWhirlpool, Varese
Attendance: 2,950
Referees: Srdan Dozai (CRO), Murat Biricik (TUR), Sasa Maricic (SRB)

30 October 2013
20:30 CET

Boxscore

Union Olimpija (Slovenia)	67–64	(Spain) Valencia BC
Scoring by quarter: 14–14, 16–14, 23–12, 14–24
Pts: Stepheson 18; Rebs: Stepheson 11; Asts: Joksimović 4		Pts: Sato, Lafayette 13; Rebs: Lafayette, Sato 7 Asts: Martínez, Sato 2

Arena Stožice, Ljubljana
Attendance: 2,500
Referees: Christos Christodoulou (GRE), Sergio Silva (ESP), Markos Michaelides (SUI)

=== Game 4 ===
5 November 2013
19:30 CET

Boxscore

Paris-Levallois Basket (France)	83–65	(France) ASVEL Basket
Scoring by quarter: 22–14, 24–20, 17–18, 20–13
Pts: Lang, Sané 16; Rebs: Brown 11; Asts: Ewing 8		Pts: Wright 13; Rebs: Joseph 7 Asts: Wright 4

Palais des sports Marcel-Cerdan, Paris
Attendance: 1,000
Referees: Juan Carlos Garcia Gonzalez (ESP), Arnis Ozols (LAT), Moritz Reiter (GER)

6 November 2013
19:30 CET

Boxscore

ratiopharm Ulm (Germany)	83–80	(Slovenia) Union Olimpija
Scoring by quarter: 23–26, 31–18, 12–21, 17–15
Pts: Clyburn 17; Rebs: Plaisted 8 Asts: Günther 5		Pts: Omić 18; Rebs: Omić 10; Asts: Jackson 6

Ratiopharm arena, Ulm
Attendance: 4,600
Referees: Gianluca Mattioli (ITA), Tomasz Trawicki (POL), Regis Bardera (FRA)

6 November 2013
20:30 CET

Boxscore

Valencia BC (Spain)	98–64	(Italy) Cimberio Varese
Scoring by quarter: 21–14, 25–17, 23–16, 29–17
Pts: Doellman 26; Rebs: Doellman, Lishouk 6 Asts: Van Rossom 7		Pts: Coleman 14; Rebs: Hassell 9 Asts: Clark 4

Pabellón Fuente San Luis, Valencia
Attendance: 6,000
Referees: Robert Lottermoser (GER), Jakub Zamojski (POL), Tomislav Vovk (CRO)

=== Game 5 ===
13 November 2013
20:00 CET

Boxscore

ASVEL Basket (France)	79–76	(Spain) Valencia BC
Scoring by quarter: 20–14, 21–19, 12–17, 26–26
Pts: Wright, Jackson 17; Rebs: Joseph 6 Asts: Jackson 6		Pts: Doellman 19; Rebs: Doellman 11; Asts: Lafayette 4

L'Astroballe, Villeurbanne
Attendance: 3,501
Referees: Paolo Taurino (ITA), Anastasios Piloidis (GRE), Saso Petek (SLO)

13 November 2013
20:30 CET

Boxscore

Cimberio Varese (Italy)	77–78	(Germany) ratiopharm Ulm
Scoring by quarter: 18–17, 22–20, 26–22, 11–19
Pts: Šćekić 14; Rebs: Ere 8 Asts: Ere 6		Pts: Long 21; Rebs: Plaisted 10; Asts: Three players 2

PalaWhirlpool, Varese
Attendance: 3,024
Referees: Juan Carlos Arteaga (ESP), Petros Papapetrou (GRE), Mario Majkic (SLO)

13 November 2013
20:30 CET

Boxscore

Union Olimpija (Slovenia)	74–66 (OT)	(France) Paris-Levallois Basket
Scoring by quarter: 22–12, 6–23, 22–11, 13–17, Overtime: 11–3
Pts: Gailius 21; Rebs: Jackson 8 Asts: Jackson 12		Pts: N'Doye 16; Rebs: Brown 7 Asts: Ewing 4

Arena Stožice, Ljubljana
Attendance: 3,000
Referees: Emin Mogulkoc (TUR), Sasa Maricic (SRB), Ersan Kartal (TUR)

=== Game 6 ===
19 November 2013
20:30 CET

Boxscore

Valencia BC (Spain)	98–52	(France) Paris-Levallois Basket
Scoring by quarter: 26–11, 19–13, 29–16, 24–12
Pts: Pecherov 17; Rebs: Triguero 7 Asts: Van Rossom 6		Pts: N'Doye 17; Rebs: N'Doye 6 Asts: Albicy 4

Pabellón Fuente San Luis, Valencia
Attendance: 7,000
Referees: Ilija Belosevic (SRB), Spiros Gkontas (GRE), Marko Juras (SRB)

20 November 2013
20:00 CET

Boxscore

ASVEL Basket (France)	60–78	(Germany) ratiopharm Ulm
Scoring by quarter: 14–26, 20–18, 12–18, 14–16
Pts: Nsonwu-Amadi 13; Rebs: Nsonwu-Amadi 6 Asts: three players 3		Pts: Long 19; Rebs: Nankivil 8 Asts: Günther 4

L'Astroballe, Villeurbanne
Attendance: 3,845
Referees: Carmelo Paternico (ITA), Miroslav Tomov (BUL), Nick van der Broeck (BEL)

20 November 2013
20:30 CET

Boxscore

Cimberio Varese (Italy)	82–83 (OT)	(Slovenia) Union Olimpija
Scoring by quarter: 25–10, 11–24, 14–20, 21–17, Overtime: 11–12
Pts: Clark 23; Rebs: De Nicolao 8 Asts: Ere 4		Pts: Gailius 31; Rebs: Gailius 10; Asts: Joksimović 5

PalaWhirlpool, Varese
Attendance: 2,966
Referees: Juan Carlos Garcia Gonzalez (ESP), Zdravko Rutesic (MNE), Benjamin Jimenez (ESP)

=== Game 7 ===
26 November 2013
19:30 CET

Boxscore

ratiopharm Ulm (Germany)	92–84	(Spain) Valencia BC
Scoring by quarter: 23–26, 21–15, 27–23, 21–20
Pts: Long 18; Rebs: Clyburn 6 Asts: Long 6		Pts: Doellman 16; Rebs: Triguero, Doellman 7 Asts: Van Rossom 4

Ratiopharm arena, Ulm
Attendance: 5,000
Referees: Tolga Sahin (ITA), Eddie Viator (FRA), Elias Koromilas (GRE)

26 November 2013
20:00 CET

Boxscore

Paris-Levallois Basket (France)	77–65	(Italy) Cimberio Varese
Scoring by quarter: 14–11, 21–11, 23–27, 19–16
Pts: Albicy 15; Rebs: Williams, Sané 8 Asts: Ewing 5		Pts: Clark 18; Rebs: Ere 8 Asts: Clark 4

Palais des sports Marcel-Cerdan, Paris
Attendance: 1,200
Referees: Christos Christodoulou (GRE), Emilio Perez Pizarro (ESP), Carlos Cortes (ESP)

27 November 2013
20:30 CET

Boxscore

Union Olimpija (Slovenia)	86–48	(France) ASVEL Basket
Scoring by quarter: 21–16, 18–13, 29–8, 18–11
Pts: Salin 25; Rebs: Stepheson 10; Asts: Jackson 5		Pts: Joseph 11; Rebs: Nsonwu-Amadi 8 Asts: Joseph 4

Arena Stožice, Ljubljana
Attendance: 4,100
Referees: Oscar Perea (ESP), Robert Vyklicky (CZE), Sergiy Zashchuk (UKR)

=== Game 8 ===
3 December 2013
19:30 CET

Boxscore

ratiopharm Ulm (Germany)	56–48	(France) Paris-Levallois Basket
Scoring by quarter: 19–8, 12–13, 19–17, 6–10
Pts: Clyburn 10; Rebs: Plaisted 9 Asts: Long 4		Pts: Ewing 18; Rebs: Sané 7 Asts: Albicy 5

Ratiopharm arena, Ulm
Attendance: 5,000
Referees: Ilija Belosevic (SRB), Benjamin Jimenez (ESP), Markos Michaelides (SUI)

4 December 2013
20:00 CET

Boxscore

ASVEL Basket (France)	83–80	(Italy) Cimberio Varese
Scoring by quarter: 22–20, 20–19, 21–15, 20–26
Pts: E. Jackson 18; Rebs: Nsonwu-Amadi 7 Asts: Wright 5		Pts: Banks, Hassell 15; Rebs: Hassell 8 Asts: Clark 3

L'Astroballe, Villeurbanne
Attendance: 4,124
Referees: Milivoje Jovcic (SRB), Gentian Cici (ALB), Ilya Putenko (RUS)

4 December 2013
20:30 CET

Boxscore

Valencia BC (Spain)	91–93	(Slovenia) Union Olimpija
Scoring by quarter: 25–23, 19–21, 22–26, 25–23
Pts: Doellman 28; Rebs: Doellman 9 Asts: Lafayette, Van Rossom 5		Pts: Gailius 24; Rebs: Salin 7 Asts: Jackson 7

Pabellón Fuente San Luis, Valencia
Attendance: 7,600
Referees: Fernando Rocha (POR), Renaud Geller (BEL), Marius Ciulin (ROM)

=== Game 9 ===
11 December 2013
20:00 CET

Boxscore

ASVEL Basket (France)	72–74	(France) Paris-Levallois Basket
Scoring by quarter: 15–15, 24–18, 22–21, 11–20
Pts: Jackson 22; Rebs: Chassang 7 Asts: Wright 6		Pts: Oniangue 16; Rebs: Albicy 6 Asts: Albicy 9

L'Astroballe, Villeurbanne
Attendance: 3,841
Referees: Miguel Perez Perez (ESP), Moritz Rieter (GER), Saverio Lanzarini (ITA)

11 December 2013
20:30 CET

Boxscore

Cimberio Varese (Italy)	62–94	(Spain) Valencia BC
Scoring by quarter: 17–16, 10–23, 22–26, 13–29
Pts: Hassell 14; Rebs: Affia Ambadiang, Hassell 5 Asts: Clark 4		Pts: Ribas 23; Rebs: Dubljević 8 Asts: Van Rossom 6

PalaWhirlpool, Varese
Attendance: 3,207
Referees: Grzegorz Ziemblicki (POL), Miroslav Tomov (BUL), Saso Petek (SLO)

11 December 2013
20:30 CET

Boxscore

Union Olimpija (Slovenia)	74–61	(Germany) ratiopharm Ulm
Scoring by quarter: 18–18, 15–17, 21–11, 20–15
Pts: Vladović 17; Rebs: Stepheson 10; Asts: Jackson 3		Pts: Schwethelm 11; Rebs: Nankivil 10; Asts: Howard 3

Arena Stožice, Ljubljana
Attendance: 4,500
Referees: Jose Ramon Garcia Ortiz (ESP), Roberto Chiari (ITA), Emin Mogulkoc (TUR)

=== Game 10 ===
17 December 2013
20:30 CET

Boxscore

Paris-Levallois Basket (France)	80–63	(Slovenia) Union Olimpija
Scoring by quarter: 23–24, 17–15, 24–12, 16–12
Pts: three players 13; Rebs: Oniangue 6 Asts: Albicy 8		Pts: Salin 20; Rebs: Drobnjak, Omić 7 Asts: Joksimović 3

Palais des sports Marcel-Cerdan, Paris
Attendance: 1,000
Referees: Juan Carlos Arteaga (ESP), Francico Araña (ESP), Piotr Pastusiak (POL)

17 December 2013
20:45 CET

Boxscore

Valencia BC (Spain)	97–70	(France) ASVEL Basket
Scoring by quarter: 31–10, 20–19, 24–19, 22–22
Pts: Doellman 16; Rebs: Martínez 5 Asts: Van Rossom 7		Pts: Sy 12; Rebs: Chassang 4 Asts: E. Jackson 4

Pabellón Fuente San Luis, Valencia
Attendance: 7,700
Referees: Guerrino Cerebuch (ITA), Milija Vojinovic (SRB), Ioannis Foufis (GRE)

18 December 2013
19:30 CET

Boxscore

ratiopharm Ulm (Germany)	75–86	(Italy) Cimberio Varese
Scoring by quarter: 22–24, 11–14, 20–23, 22–25
Pts: Plaisted 16; Rebs: Plaisted 11; Asts: Sosa 12		Pts: Banks 17; Rebs: Hassell, Šćekić 5 Asts: De Nicolao 6

Ratiopharm arena, Ulm
Attendance: 5,000
Referees: Andrej Jersan (SLO), Arnis Ozols (LAT), Aleksandar Glisic (SRB)
