= Achille Polonara =

Italian former basketball player (born 1991)

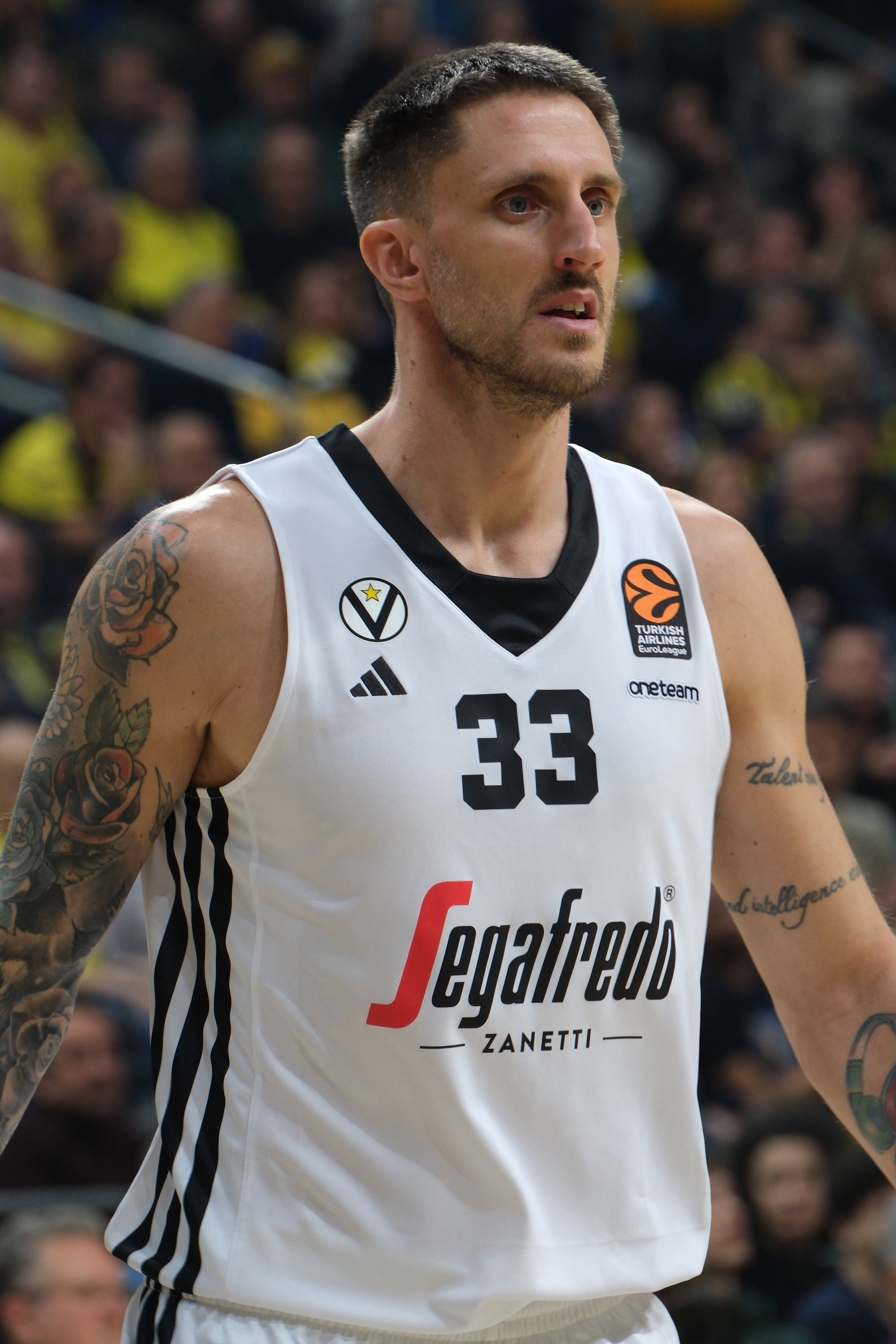
- Polonara with Virtus Bologna in 2025

Personal information
- Born: 23 November 1991 (age 34) Ancona, Italy
- Listed height: 2.03 m (6 ft 8 in)
- Listed weight: 90 kg (198 lb)

Career information
- NBA draft: 2013: undrafted
- Playing career: 2009–2025
- Position: Power forward

Career history
- 2009–2012: Teramo
- 2012–2014: Varese
- 2014–2017: Reggiana
- 2017–2019: Dinamo Sassari
- 2019–2021: Baskonia
- 2021–2022: Fenerbahçe
- 2022–2023: Anadolu Efes
- 2023: Žalgiris Kaunas
- 2023–2025: Virtus Bologna

Career highlights
- Lega Serie A champion (2025); Lithuanian League champion (2023); King Mindaugas Cup winner (2023); Turkish League champion (2022); Liga ACB champion (2020); FIBA Europe Cup champion (2019); 2x Italian Supercup winner (2015, 2023); 2× LBA Best Player Under 22 (2012, 2013)
Medals
Men's basketball
Representing Italy
FIBA Europe Under-20 Championship
Silver medal – second place	2011 Spain

Achille Polonara (born 23 November 1991) is an Italian former professional basketball player who primarily played at the power forward position.

== Professional career ==
=== Teramo Basket (2009–2012) ===
After progressing through the youth ranks of Banca Tercas Teramo, Polonara debuted in the first division, the Serie A, in the first game of 2009-10 though he rarely featured that season and played sparingly the next.

He played more regularly during the 2011-12 season with 8.2 points and 4.5 rebounds in 15.6 minutes on average, some coming from a stellar performance against Fabi Shoes Montegranaro in April with 34 points (13/14 from the field) and 9 rebounds for a valuation of 46. This helped the youngster win the Best Player Under 22 award for the season. He was also selected (as a replacement) for the Serie A All Star Game.

=== Cimberio Varese (2012–2014) ===
Teramo was struggling financially and filed for bankruptcy during the summer of 2012, forcing Polonara to find a new club, which he did in July, signing a 3-year contract containing various escape clauses with Cimberio Varese. Both parties profited from the deal as Polonara contributed 9.5 points, 5.4 rebounds and 1.6 steals in 23 minutes per game to help the side finish first in the 2012-13 regular season. He posted 5.8 points, 3.4 rebounds and 0.8 steals in 15 minutes per game in the playoffs as Varese took eventual champions Montepaschi Siena to a seventh game in the semifinals. Polonara was named as the Best Player Under 22 for the second successive season.

The next season saw major players such as Bryant Dunston leave the side, which meant Polonara accrued more playing time. However, Varese had an anonymous season, losing to Oldenburg in the Euroleague qualifying rounds despite Polonara's team high 18 points to exit Europe's premier competition. Demoted to the European second tier EuroCup, Varese finished last in group C to also exit the competition, with Polonara posting 7.2 points and 3.6 rebounds per game. The team also finished out of playoff contention in the league, though he had figures of 10.5 points and 4.8 rebounds per game. The Anconan received a third successive call up to the All Star Game, played in his hometown, winning the Slam Dunk contest.

Varese lost its main sponsor during the off-season, meaning that Polonara's reported €180,000 final contract year was too costly, he wasn't prepared to take a pay cut and wanted to play in a European competition to keep progressing so left the side.

=== Pallacanestro Reggiana (2014–2017) ===
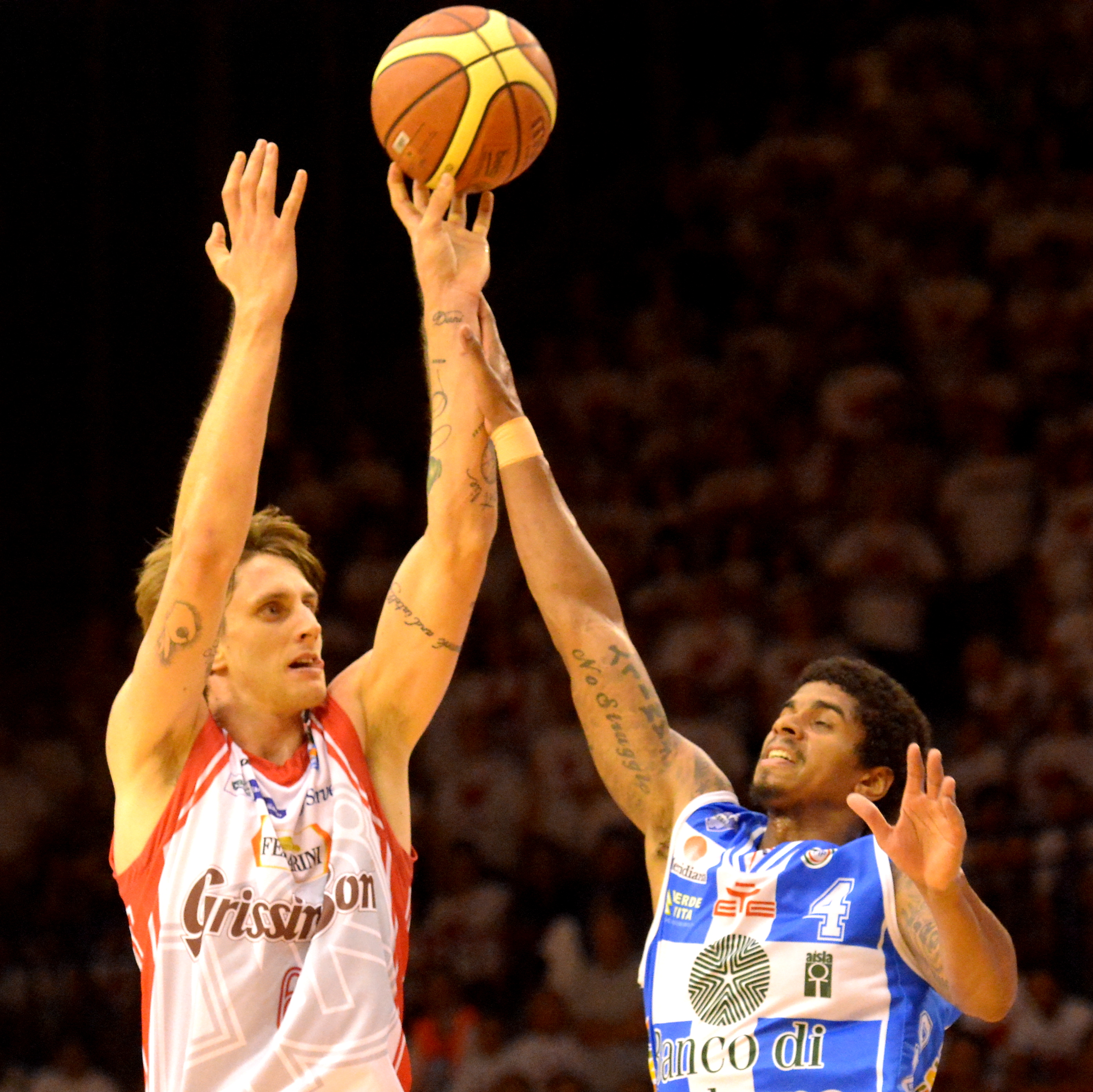
Polonara with Reggio Emilia in 2015

Polonara joined Grissin Bon Reggio Emilia in July 2014, signing a three-year contract (with a mutual escape clause after the second year) with the EuroCup playing side. He cited Reggio's practice of playing young Italians as a factor in the decision.

Though Reggio were eliminated in the Eurocup group stage, Polonara started all games, ending as the team's second best scorer (11ppg) and best rebounder (6.4rpg) for a team second 14.3 valuation. He even picked up a (shared) Round 7 MVP award after a determinant contribution to the November 2014 win over Paris-Levallois.

Polonara had his breakout year in the Serie A, playing more minutes (31.1) than any other teammate, he also finished as second best scorer and best rebounder to earn the highest valuation of the team. His figures of 8.4 rebounds and 18.1 in valuation per game also ranked him 5th in the league for each, with Gazzetta choosing him as their second most improved player for 2014–15.

=== Dinamo Basket Sassari (2017–2019) ===
In 2017, he signed for Dinamo Basket Sassari, where he will play for two more seasons in the Italian Basketball League. Dinamo Basket Sassari finished second in the 2018-2019 Italian Basketball League, losing to Reyer Venezia in the finals. An important part of Sassari, who won the FIBA Europe Cup that season, Polonara supported his team with an average of 12.5 points, 6 rebounds, and 2 assists in FIBA Europe Cup.

=== Baskonia (2019–2021) ===
On 28 August 2019, Polonara signed a two-year deal with Spanish EuroLeague club Kirolbet Baskonia. He won the Spanish league with Baskonia in the 2019–2020 season. On 3 July 2020, Polonara renewed his contract with the Basques.

=== Fenerbahçe (2021–2022) ===
On 29 June 2021, Polonara signed with Fenerbahçe of the Turkish Basketball Super League (BSL) and the EuroLeague. During the 2021-2022 BSL campaign, he averaged 10 points, 5.7 rebounds and 2 assists per game, helping the team to win the domestic championship. Additionally, he posted 7.3 points, 4.3 rebounds and 1.1 assists in 30 EuroLeague appearances. On 20 July 2022, Polonara parted ways with the Turkish powerhouse.

=== Anadolu Efes (2022–2023) ===
On 20 July 2022, Polonara signed with Anadolu Efes of the Turkish Basketball Super League (BSL) and the EuroLeague. On 7 January 2023, Polonara parted ways with the Turkish powerhouse.

=== Žalgiris Kaunas (2023) ===
On 7 January 2023, Polonara signed with Žalgiris Kaunas of the Lithuanian Basketball League (LKL) and the EuroLeague for the rest of the season. On June 15 of the same year, he parted ways with the Lithuanian club.

=== Virtus Bologna (2023–2025) ===
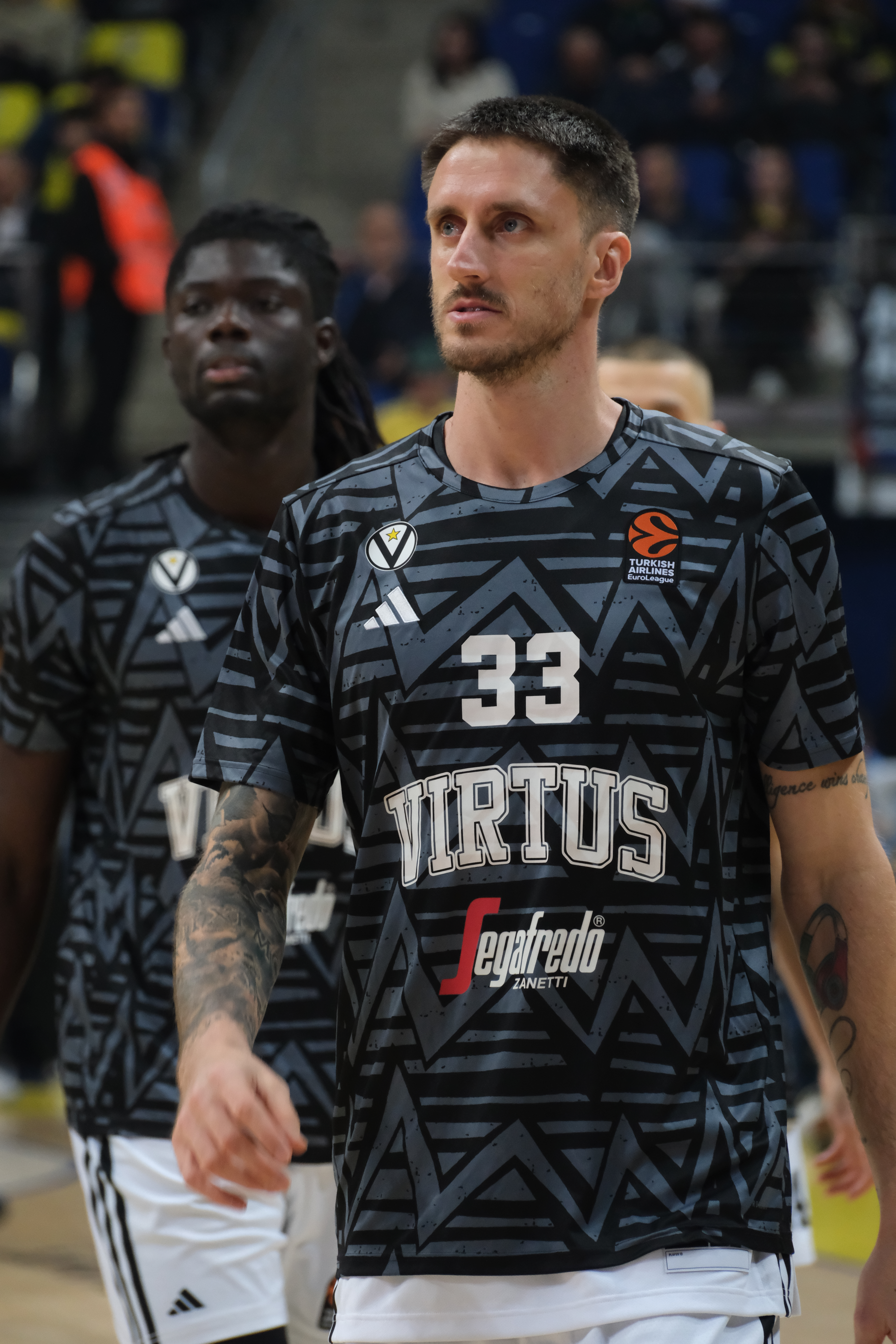
Polonara with Virtus Bologna in 2025

In July 2023, Polonara signed a two-year deal with Virtus Bologna of the Italian Lega Basket Serie A (LBA)) and the EuroLeague. On 24 September 2023, after having ousted Olimpia Milano in the semifinals, Virtus won its fourth Supercup, and the third in a row, defeating 97–60 Germani Brescia. Despite an impressive first half of the season, Virtus ended the EuroLeague regular season at the 10th place, qualifying only for the play-in, where after having defeated 67–64 Anadolu Efes, it lost against Baskonia 89–77, not qualifying for the playoffs. Moreover, the Black V placed first during the Italian regular season but, after having knocked out Tortona by 3–2 and Reyer Venezia by 3–1, it lost the third consecutive final against Milan by 3–1.

In the following season Virtus ended the EuroLeague at the 17th place, after a disappointing regular season. After arriving first in the national championship season, Virtus eliminated Venezia 3–2 and their arch-rival Milan 3–1, reaching their fifth finals in a row. They then defeated Brescia 3–0, claiming the Italian championship title for the 17th time.

=== Dinamo Sassari (2025–2026) ===
On 22 August 2025, he signed with Dinamo Sassari of the Lega Basket Serie A (LBA).

On 4 May 2026, he announced his retirement from competitive basketball.

== National team career ==
Polonara started playing for the youth squads of the Italian national team, first with the Under-18's at the 2009 European Championship. He notably won the silver medal with the U20's at the 2011 European Championship where he was an important contributor, including being the best performer in the semifinal against France.

Polonara was called up to the preliminary squad of the senior team as a temporary replacement for the injured Nicolò Melli as they prepared for EuroBasket 2013. However he himself later picked an ankle injury and was dropped from the squad. He would rejoin the senior side in 2014, scoring 20 points on his genuine (discounting the All Star Game) debut against German, he then became a regular in Italy squads.

Participating in the successful EuroBasket 2015 qualification, he played in all 4 games with an average of 3.8 points and 1.3 rebounds in 8.5 minutes. He was called up to the squad that would take part in EuroBasket 2015 to start on 5 September.

=== International statistics ===
Year	Competition	GP	GS	MPG	FG%	3P%	FT%	RPG	APG	SPG	BPG	PPG
2015	EuroBasket	5	0	4.4	.400	.000	-	.1	.1	.1	.1	.6
Career		5	0	4.4	.400	.000	-	.1	.1	.1	.1	.6

== Player profile ==
Rebounding is his statistical strength on both ends of the court, using his instincts and speed to surprise opponents.

In attack, he is capable of operating on the perimeter, where his speed allows him to beat larger defenders or score from mid-range. His wingspan contributes to his offensive effectiveness, and he is also mobile on the floor. Defensively, he is an active rebounder and shot blocker, with good timing. His lateral speed and wingspan allow him to defend pick and roll situations and switch onto guards.

A mayor negative is his lanky frame, it can see him struggle defending against inside players or muscular guards, in offense it also limits his post move when he's back to the basket, making him an imperfect fit for the 4 position. For the 3 position, he lacks safe ball-handling on the dribble and needs to develop his shooting options to be a better fit and develop from his Tweener status.

However, he has regularly been noted for his work ethic and determination. For future development, he identifies defensive concentration, 1 vs 1 play, and better three point shooting as priorities.

== Personal life ==
Achille credits his older brother Valerio, who has had a career in the Italian lower leagues, as inspiring him to become a basketball player, the brothers (separated in age by 7 years) are very close.

His nephew, Michele Serpilli, also plays basketball, with the Pesaro youth teams, he reportedly is an admirer of Polonara.

In October 2023, Polonara undergone a surgery to remove a testicular cancer, returning to the court after two months. In June 2025, he was diagnosed with myeloid leukemia.

== Career statistics ==
Legend
GP	Games played	GS	Games started	MPG	Minutes per game
FG%	Field-goal percentage	3P%	3-point field-goal percentage	FT%	Free-throw percentage
RPG	Rebounds per game	APG	Assists per game	SPG	Steals per game
BPG	Blocks per game	PPG	Points per game	PIR	Performance index rating
**Bold**	Career high

=== EuroLeague ===
Year	Team	GP	GS	MPG	FG%	3P%	FT%	RPG	APG	SPG	BPG	PPG	PIR
2019–20	Baskonia	27	0	12.5	.326	.225	.643	2.8	.2	.6	.4	3.1	4.2
2020–21	Baskonia	**33**	**29**	**29.7**	.512	.443	.603	**6.6**	**1.9**	**1.2**	**.9**	**12.2**	**16.5**
2021–22	Fenerbahçe	30	4	22.3	.436	.302	.600	4.3	1.1	.7	.5	7.3	9.0
2022–23	Anadolu Efes	15	8	11.4	**.533**	.429	.571	2.2	.3	.1	.5	2.8	4.4
2022–23	Žalgiris	20	1	18.1	.421	.364	**.684**	4.3	1.4	.7	.5	4.7	8.3
2023–24	Bologna	21	1	12.6	.439	**.448**	.600	2.7	1.2	.5	.5	3.1	5.3
Career		146	43	19.1	.459	.366	.617	4.1	1.1	.7	.6	6.2	8.7

=== EuroCup ===
Year	Team	GP	GS	MPG	FG%	3P%	FT%	RPG	APG	SPG	BPG	PPG	PIR
2013–14	Varese	10	10	25.3	.278	.318	.625	3.6	1.1	1.0	.5	7.2	6.0
2014–15	Reggio Emilia	10	10	**30.9**	.406	.289	**.767**	6.4	1.3	**1.1**	**.6**	11.0	14.3
2015–16	Reggio Emilia	**16**	**15**	26.0	**.482**	**.361**	.615	**6.9**	**1.4**	.6	**.6**	**11.1**	**14.6**
Career		36	35	27.2	.413	.327	.671	5.9	1.3	.9	.6	10.0	12.1

=== Domestic leagues ===
Legend
GP	Games played	GS	Games started	MPG	Minutes per game	PPG	Points per game
2P%	Two-point field goal percentage	3P%	3-point field goal percentage	FT%	Free throw percentage
RPG	Rebounds per game	APG	Assists per game	BPG	Blocks per game
SPG	Steals per game	TOPG	Turnovers per game	**Bold**	Career high

Regular season
Year	Team	GP	GS	MPG	PPG	2P%	3P%	FT%	RPG	APG	BPG	SPG	TOPG
2009–10	Teramo	5	0	5.0	2.0	**.750**	**.500**	**1.000**	.4	.0	.2	.4	.2
2010–11	Teramo	26	1	11.6	3.0	.386	.100	.718	3.2	.4	**.9**	.6	.7
2011–12	Teramo	**32**	0	15.6	8.2	.708	.341	.633	4.5	.7	.7	.7	1.2
2012–13	Varese	28	7	22.9	9.5	.543	.342	.636	5.4	1.0	.6	**1.6**	**1.4**
2013–14	Varese	30	**30**	26.6	10.5	.593	.336	.746	4.8	1.1	.4	.7	1.0
2014–15	Reggio Emilia	30	27	**31.1**	**12.0**	.578	.375	.627	**8.4**	1.4	.8	.9	1.0
2015–16	Reggio Emilia	30	29	26.9	10.4	.600	.349	.592	7.1	1.4	.5	.8	1.1
2016–17	Reggio Emilia	30	20	28.1	10.5	.605	.379	.565	6.8	**1.7**	.6	.9	.9
2017–18	Sassari	30	28	27.2	10.9	.581	.405	.596	5.6	1.6	.7	.7	.9
2018–19	Sassari	29	1	21.2	9.9	.614	.361	.763	5.5	1.2	.6	.6	.8
2019–20†	Baskonia	23	0	11.0	4.4	.619	.344	.762	2.3	.3	.2	.4	.3

Playoffs
Year	Team	GP	GS	MPG	PPG	2P%	3P%	FT%	RPG	APG	BPG	SPG	TOPG
2013	Varese	12	1	14.8	5.8	.500	.333	**.778**	3.4	.7	.0	.8	.8
2015	Reggio Emilia	**19**	**19**	**33.4**	**12.2**	.526	.348	.644	**8.1**	1.6	**.9**	1.2	1.2
2016	Reggio Emilia	16	11	30.1	9.9	.662	.237	.700	7.6	**1.7**	**.9**	**1.3**	**1.3**
2017	Reggio Emilia	3	2	23.0	7.3	**.800**	.308	.400	4.3	.3	.3	.3	**1.3**
2019	Sassari	13	0	21.5	8.7	.604	.351	.640	5.5	1.2	.4	.8	.8
2020†	Baskonia	7	1	18.4	8.3	.652	**.500**	.700	4.7	.9	.6	.9	.9

== Honours ==
=== Individual ===
- Serie A
  - Best Player Under 22: 2012, 2013
- Lega Basket All Star Game
  - Participant: 2012–2015
  - Slam dunk contest winner: 2014
- Premio Reverberi: 2015 (best player)

=== Team ===
==== International ====
- European Under-20 Championship
  - 2011 Bilbao Silver
