= Eurocup 2014–15 Regular Season Group A =

Standings and results for Group A of the Regular Season phase of the 2014–15 Eurocup basketball tournament.

== Standings ==
Pos	Team	Pld	W	L	PF	PA	PD
1	(France) Strasbourg	10	8	2	742	701	+41
2	(Germany) Brose Bamberg	10	6	4	768	672	+96
3	(France) Paris-Levallois	10	5 (Note: Head-to-head: 1-1 (+2))	5	753	759	−6
4	(Spain) CAI Zaragoza	10	5 (Note: Head-to-head: 1-1 (-2))	5	831	812	+19
5	(Germany) Telekom Bonn	10	4	6	774	851	−77
6	(Italy) Grissin Bon Reggio Emilia	10	2	8	735	808	−73

Source: Euroleague Basketball

== Fixtures and results ==
=== Game 1 ===
15 October 2014
20:30

Report

CAI Zaragoza (Spain)	77–76	(France) Paris-Levallois
Scoring by quarter: 17–17, 21–16, 15–13, 24–30
Pts: Jelovac, Landry 15; Rebs: Tomàs 5 Asts: Llompart 8		Pts: Schilb 17; Rebs: Labeyrie 7 Asts: Green 9

Pabellón Príncipe Felipe, Zaragoza
Attendance: 6,254
Referees: Carmelo Paternico (ITA), Petri Mantyla (FIN), Clements Fritz (GER)

15 October 2014
19:30

Report

Telekom Baskets Bonn (Germany)	83–86	(France) Strasbourg
Scoring by quarter: 16–21, 26–24, 22–13, 19–28
Pts: Wachalski 24; Rebs: Klimavicius 10; Asts: Lawrence 10		Pts: Campbell 18; Rebs: Howard 7 Asts: Campbell 5

Telekom Dome, Bonn
Attendance: 2,900
Referees: Vicente Bulto (ESP), Sergiy Chebyshev (UKR), Ingus Baumanis (LAT)

15 October 2014
20:30

Report

Grissin Bon Reggio Emilia (Italy)	70–67	(Germany) Brose Baskets
Scoring by quarter: 9–11, 26–20, 14–19, 21–17
Pts: Cinciarini 15; Rebs: Cinciarini 9 Asts: Cinciarini 6		Pts: Brown 26; Rebs: Mbakwe 14; Asts: Wanamaker 3

PalaDozza, Reggio Emilia
Attendance: 2,986
Referees: Benjamin Jimenez (ESP), Joseph Bissang (FRA), Aleksandar Glisic (SRB)

=== Game 2 ===
21 October 2014
20:30

Report

Paris-Levallois (France)	88–76	(Italy) Grissin Bon Reggio Emilia
Scoring by quarter: 20–19, 22–19, 29–16, 17–22
Pts: Sane 19; Rebs: Ford, Jean-Baptiste 11; Asts: Schilb 7		Pts: Mussini 19; Rebs: Polonara 10; Asts: Cinciarini 7

Palais des Sports Marcel Cerdan, Paris
Attendance: 1,700
Referees: Antonio Conde (ESP), Miguel Angel Perez Niz (ESP), Nick van den Broeck (BEL)

22 October 2014
20:00

Report

Brose Baskets (Germany)	104–79	(Germany) Telekom Baskets Bonn
Scoring by quarter: 23–15, 32–24, 26–21, 23–19
Pts: Thompson 22; Rebs: Mbakwe 9 Asts: Wanamaker 10		Pts: Lawrence 19; Rebs: Caloiaro 6 Asts: Lawrence 4

Brose Arena, Bamberg
Attendance: 6,800
Referees: Panagiotis Anastopoulos (GRE), Uros Obrknezevic (SRB), Jurgis Laurinavicius (LTU)

22 October 2014
20:00

Report

Strasbourg (France)	88–86	(Spain) CAI Zaragoza
Scoring by quarter: 12–18, 14–19, 35–16, 13–21
Pts: Diot 26; Rebs: Howard 10; Asts: Diot 8		Pts: Jelovac 16; Rebs: Jelovac 8 Asts: Lisch 4

Rhénus Sport, Strasbourg
Attendance: 4,215
Referees: Matej Boltauzer (SLO), Ilya Putenko (RUS), Alessandro Martolini (ITA)

=== Game 3 ===
28 October 2014
20:30

Report

Grissin Bon Reggio Emilia (Italy)	59–66	(France) Strasbourg
Scoring by quarter: 10–12, 22–13, 16–21, 11–20
Pts: Kaukėnas 13; Rebs: Cinciarini, Polonara 7 Asts: Lavrinovič 4		Pts: Traoré 16; Rebs: Diot 10; Asts: Campbell 6

PalaDozza, Reggio Emilia
Attendance: 2,250
Referees: Recep Ankarali (TUR), Petros Papapetrou (GRE), Josip Radojkovic (SRB)

29 October 2014
19:30

Report

Telekom Baskets Bonn (Germany)	90–88	(Spain) CAI Zaragoza
Scoring by quarter: 26–18, 23–25, 16–22, 25–23
Pts: Mädrich 20; Rebs: Caloiaro 7 Asts: Lawrence 10		Pts: Goulding, Jelovac 19; Rebs: Katić 5 Asts: Llompart 6

Telekom Dome, Bonn
Attendance: 3,500
Referees: Sasa Pukl (SLO), Gianluca Mattioli (ITA), Amit Balak (ISR)

29 October 2014
20:00

Report

Brose Baskets (Germany)	81–55	(France) Paris-Levallois
Scoring by quarter: 19–10, 26–17, 20–9, 16–19
Pts: Mbakwe 17; Rebs: Theis 8 Asts: Wanamaker 9		Pts: Lang, Schilb 11; Rebs: four players 4 Asts: Green 5

Brose Arena, Bamberg
Attendance: 6,800
Referees: Vicente Bulto (ESP), Rustu Nuran (TUR), Sergiy Chebyshev (UKR)

=== Game 4 ===
4 November 2014

CAI Zaragoza (Spain)	93–79	(Italy) Grissin Bon Reggio Emilia

5 November 2014

Telekom Baskets Bonn (Germany)	81–78	(France) Paris-Levallois

5 November 2014

Strasbourg (France)	77–74	(Germany) Brose Baskets

=== Game 5 ===
11 November 2014

Paris-Levallois (France)	76–61	(France) Strasbourg

12 November 2014

Brose Baskets (Germany)	90–74	(Spain) CAI Zaragoza

12 November 2014

Grissin Bon Reggio Emilia (Italy)	84–85	(Germany) Telekom Baskets Bonn

=== Game 6 ===
18 November 2014

Paris-Levallois (France)	90–87	(Spain) CAI Zaragoza

19 November 2014

Brose Baskets (Germany)	75–61	(Italy) Grissin Bon Reggio Emilia

19 November 2014

Strasbourg (France)	76–48	(Germany) Telekom Baskets Bonn

=== Game 7 ===
25 November 2014

Grissin Bon Reggio Emilia (Italy)	78–72	(France) Paris-Levallois

26 November 2014

Telekom Baskets Bonn (Germany)	52–71	(Germany) Brose Baskets

26 November 2014

CAI Zaragoza (Spain)	71–73	(France) Strasbourg

=== Game 8 ===
2 December 2014

Paris-Levallois (France)	56– 67	(Germany) Brose Baskets

3 December 2014

Strasbourg (France)	74–66	(Italy) Grissin Bon Reggio Emilia

3 December 2014

CAI Zaragoza (Spain)	90–75	(Germany) Telekom Baskets Bonn

=== Game 9 ===
9 December 2014

Paris-Levallois (France)	87–80	(Germany) Telekom Baskets Bonn

9 December 2014

Grissin Bon Reggio Emilia (Italy)	75–87	(Spain) CAI Zaragoza

10 December 2014

Brose Baskets (Germany)	63–70	(France) Strasbourg

=== Game 10 ===
16 December 2014

Strasbourg (France)	71–75	(France) Paris-Levallois

17 December 2014

Telekom Baskets Bonn (Germany)	101–87	(Italy) Grissin Bon Reggio Emilia

17 December 2014

CAI Zaragoza (Spain)	78–76	(Germany) Brose Baskets
