= Keena Young =

American basketball player (born 1985)

Personal information
- Born: April 16, 1985 (age 40) Beaumont, Texas, United States
- Listed height: 6 ft 6 in (1.98 m)
- Listed weight: 215 lb (98 kg)

Career information
- High school: Ozen (Beaumont, Texas)
- College: South Plains College (2003–2004); BYU (2004–2007)
- NBA draft: 2007: undrafted
- Playing career: 2007–2013
- Position: Small forward

Career history
- 2008–2009: Sigal Prishtina
- 2010: Air21 Express
- 2010–2011: Elitzur Ramla
- 2011: Namika Lahti
- 2013: Ballarat Miners

Career highlights
- MWC Player of the Year (2007)

Keena Young (Born April 16, 1985) is an American basketball player who starred at Brigham Young University from 2004 to 2007. He is currently an expatriate professional basketball player.

== High school ==
Young was a four-year letterman in basketball at Clifton J. Ozen High School in Beaumont, Texas. He was named All-Region three times and All-State twice. As a senior, he averaged 18 points and 10 rebounds per game; his team won the Texas State championship and earned a Top 10 national ranking.

Young was a high school teammate and friend of Kendrick Perkins. Perkins was a McDonald's All-American in 2003; he was heavily recruited by many colleges from across the United States. University of Memphis coach John Calipari offered scholarships to both Perkins and Young. Both players initially committed to play at Memphis, but Perkins changed his mind and entered the 2003 NBA draft. When he learned that Perkins would not be playing for his team, Calipari rescinded his scholarship offer to Young.

== Junior college ==
Left without a Division I scholarship late in the summer, Young ended up playing at South Plains College in Levelland, Texas. During his freshman season (2003–04), Young averaged 9.9 points and 7.2 rebounds per game. He helped the Texans post a 24–9 record, good for second place in the Western Junior College Athletic Conference.

During his freshman season, Young accepted a scholarship offer from Texas Tech coach Bob Knight. However, one of Knight's assistants visited South Plains while Young was in the midst of a slump. A short time after that, Texas Tech called South Plains coach Steve Green, informing him that Young was welcome to walk-on at Texas Tech, but he no longer had a scholarship offer there.

== Division I career ==
Because of financial concerns, Young decided not to walk-on at Texas Tech. He planned to return to South Plains for his sophomore season, but was surprised to receive a scholarship offer from Steve Cleveland, coach at Brigham Young University. He accepted the offer and joined the Cougars as a sophomore for the 2004–05 season.

Young was happy to play at a Division I school, but his first year at BYU was frustrating at times. He started the season as a backup, alternating between small forward and power forward throughout the season. Young struggled to adjust to his role on the team. Towards the end of the season, Young replaced injured Garner Meads as starting power forward. At 6-foot-6 and 215 pounds, Young was undersized at power forward, but he excelled at the position nonetheless. He scored in double figures nine times during the season, finished with an average of 7.2 points per game. He also averaged a team-high 5.6 rebounds per game. Unfortunately, Young broke his shooting hand and missed the last five games of the season. The Cougars finished 2004–05 with a disappointing 9–21 record.

Young began his junior year (2005–06) as BYU's starting power forward. He started the season slowly, but picked up his game as the season wore on. He scored in double figures in 15 of BYU's last 23 games, including his first 20-point game as a Cougar (against San Diego State). BYU improved dramatically as a team, finishing with a 20–9 record and a birth in the National Invitation Tournament. Young was a major reason for the team's improvement. He finished the season with averages of 10.3 points and 5.8 rebounds per game, and his field goal percentage (52.3 percent) ranked fifth in the Mountain West Conference (MWC). For his efforts, he was named Third Team All-MWC and First Team All-Utah by a local newspaper (the Deseret Morning News).

However, Young was overshadowed during his junior year by new teammate Trent Plaisted, a 6-foot-11 center who averaged 13.6 points and 6.9 rebounds per game. Plaisted was named MWC Freshman of the Year. In anticipation of the 2006–07 season, Plaisted was anointed BYU's go-to guy, while Young was considered just a solid role player.

As the season began, opposing teams focused their defensive efforts on Plaisted. Facing constant double-teams, Plaisted struggled early in the season. However, Young had worked hard during the summer in preparation for his senior season. He developed some strong offensive moves in the low post, and he improved his mid-range jump shot. While Plaisted struggled, Young emerged as BYU's top offensive weapon. He scored in double figures in the first seven games of the season, including 27 points and 11 rebounds in a 73–69 victory over Weber State. The 27 points represented a career high for Young.

As the season progressed, Young continued his dominating play. He led the Cougars to a championship in the BYU Holiday Classic in December 2006. He totaled 21 points and a career-high 16 rebounds against Oral Roberts in the semi-final game, then added 26 points and 9 rebounds in BYU's 77–68 win over Seton Hall in the title game. When BYU began conference play, Young elevated his game even higher. He set a new career high with 29 points in 31 minutes against Wyoming. He also added 10 rebounds in BYU's 89–81 victory.

Young was spectacular in February. He matched his career high with 29 points in another victory over Wyoming. He scored 25, 23, and 24 points in the next three games, all BYU victories. Young carried the Cougars to their first regular season MWC championship since 2000–01. Opponents took notice of Young's outstanding play. Ray Giacoletti, the coach of rival Utah, commented, "You can't guard Keena Young. Nobody can. Nobody has had an answer for Keena Young, anywhere".

However, Young faced constant double-teams and struggled in the first two games of the 2007 MWC Tournament. Fortunately for BYU, Plaisted raised his game and led the Cougars to victory each time. Young returned to form in the title game against UNLV. He set a new career-high with 34 points, including BYU's last 16 points of the game. He also added 9 rebounds, but UNLV ultimately won the game, 78–70.

Despite the loss, the Cougars received an at-large bid to enter the NCAA Tournament. They faced Xavier in the first round. Young played a solid game, finishing with 24 points and 10 rebounds, but BYU suffered a heart-breaking 79–77 loss. It was the last game of the season for the Cougars, and the last game of Young's college career.

Young finished the season with outstanding statistics: 17.4 points and 6.6 rebounds per game, along with great shooting percentages (54.3 percent on field goals, 80.3 percent on free throws). He received many honors and awards for his spectacular senior season. He was named MWC Player of the Year, First Team All-MWC, Deseret Morning News Player of the Year, Deseret Morning News First Team All-Utah, USBWA All-District VIII, and NABC All-District 13 First Team. He was also named Honorable Mention All-American by the Associated Press.

In three seasons at BYU, Young scored 1,068 points in 88 games. His 590 points during 2006–07 ranks as the 15th-highest scoring season in the history of BYU basketball.

== Professional career ==
In 2007, Young had a short stint with Spotter Leuven, a professional team in Belgium, before joining Mobis Phoebus of the Korean Basketball League (in South Korea). He had a tryout with Besançon Basket Comte Doubs of the Pro A League in France in 2008, but moved to Sigal Prishtina of the Super League in Kosovo. He led the team to the Kosovo Cup Championship in 2009 and played in the league's All-Star Game. He later spent time with Air21 Express in the Philippines before moving to Israel in August 2010 to join Elitzur Ramla.
