= 2008 NBA draft =

Basketball player selection

General information
- Sport: Basketball
- Date: June 26, 2008
- Location: WaMu Theater at Madison Square Garden (New York City, New York)
- Network: ESPN

Overview
- 60 total selections in 2 rounds
- League: NBA
- First selection: Derrick Rose (Chicago Bulls)

The 2008 NBA draft was held on June 26, 2008, at the Washington Mutual Theatre at Madison Square Garden in New York City, New York. In this draft, National Basketball Association (NBA) teams took turns selecting amateur college basketball players and other first-time eligible players, including international players from non-North American professional leagues. According to the NBA, 44 players, 39 collegiate players and five international players, filed as early-entry candidates for the 2008 NBA Draft. These numbers do not include players who are automatically eligible for the draft. The Chicago Bulls, who had a 1.7 percent probability of obtaining the first selection, won the NBA draft lottery on May 22. The Bulls' winning of the lottery was the second-largest upset in NBA Draft Lottery history behind the Orlando Magic, who won it in 1993 with just a 1.5% chance. The Miami Heat and the Minnesota Timberwolves obtained the second and third picks respectively.

For the first time in draft history the first three draft picks were all freshmen. The Chicago Bulls used the first overall pick to draft Chicago native Derrick Rose from the University of Memphis, who later went on to win the NBA Rookie of the Year Award, making him the first player to be drafted first overall and to win Rookie of the Year since LeBron James in 2003, and also became the youngest player to win the NBA Most Valuable Player Award in 2011 at age 22. The Miami Heat used the second pick to draft Michael Beasley from Kansas State University, and the Minnesota Timberwolves used the third pick to draft O. J. Mayo from The University of Southern California. The Seattle SuperSonics used their 4th overall pick to draft Russell Westbrook from The University of California, Los Angeles, who would go on to win the 2017 NBA MVP award and is widely considered the best player in this draft. With five players taken in the draft, the University of Kansas tied University of Connecticut (2006) and University of Florida (2007) for the record with the most players selected in the first two rounds of an NBA draft until the University of Kentucky (2012) broke the record with six players drafted. Another record was set when twelve freshmen were drafted, ten of whom were drafted in the first round. Of the players drafted, 29 are forwards, 19 are guards, and 12 are centers.

The 2008 NBA Draft was the final time that the Seattle SuperSonics made an NBA Draft appearance, as well as the final time that the Sonics appeared in official media publications. In early July, the franchise relocated to Oklahoma City, Oklahoma, and was renamed the Oklahoma City Thunder. The Thunder made their first NBA Draft appearance in 2009. This draft also marked the first time that an NBA D-League player was drafted. As of 2026, there are four active players from this draft who are still playing in the NBA: Kevin Love, Eric Gordon, Brook Lopez and DeAndre Jordan. Brook Lopez and DeAndre Jordan are the only players from this draft who are actively on an NBA roster.

== Draft selections ==
PG	Point guard	SG	Shooting guard	SF	Small forward	PF	Power forward	C	Center

*	Denotes player who has been selected for at least one All-Star Game and All-NBA Team
^{+}	Denotes player who has been selected for at least one All-Star Game
^{#}	Denotes player who has never appeared in an NBA regular-season or playoff game
^{~}	Denotes player who has been selected as Rookie of the Year

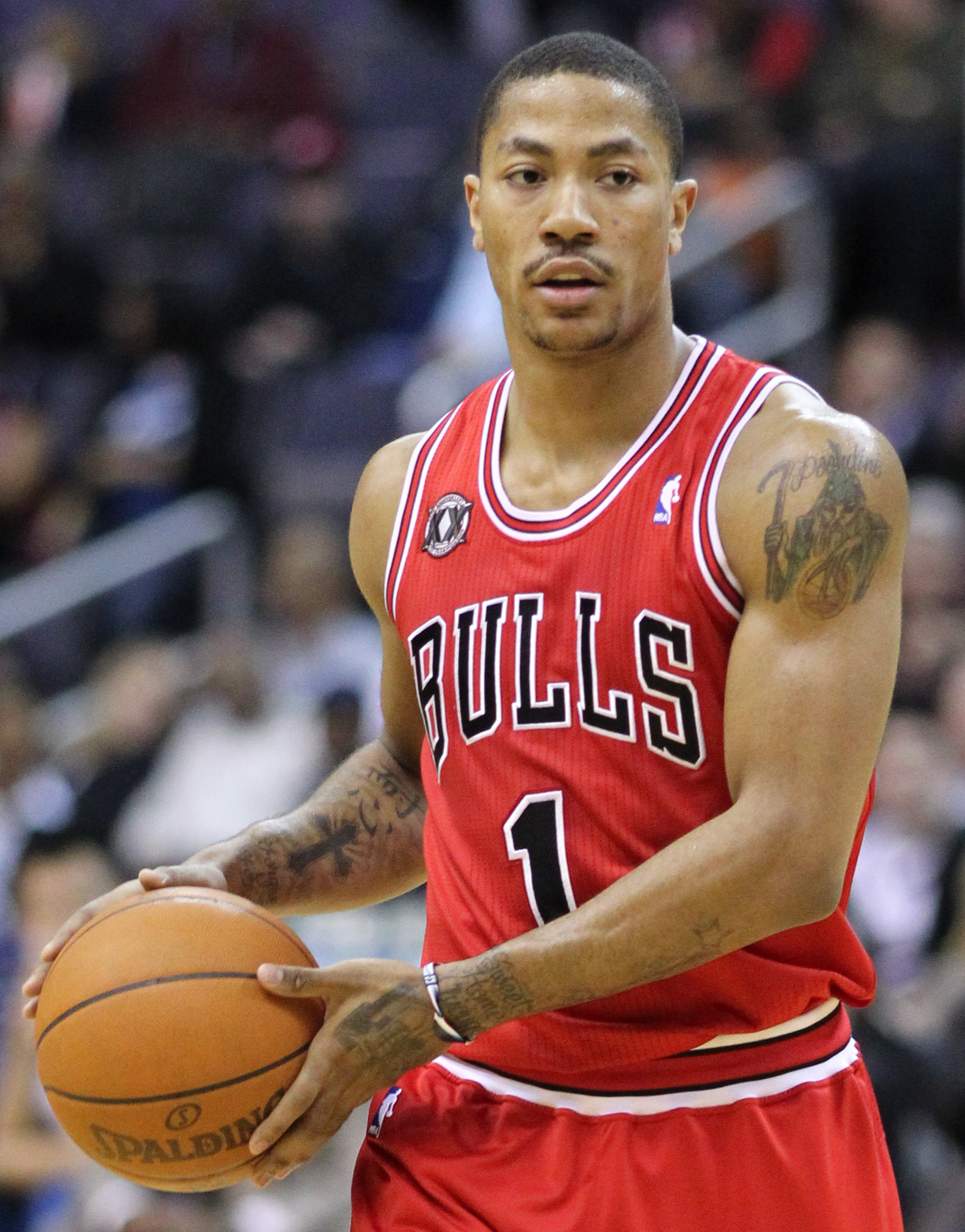
Derrick Rose was selected 1st overall by the Chicago Bulls.

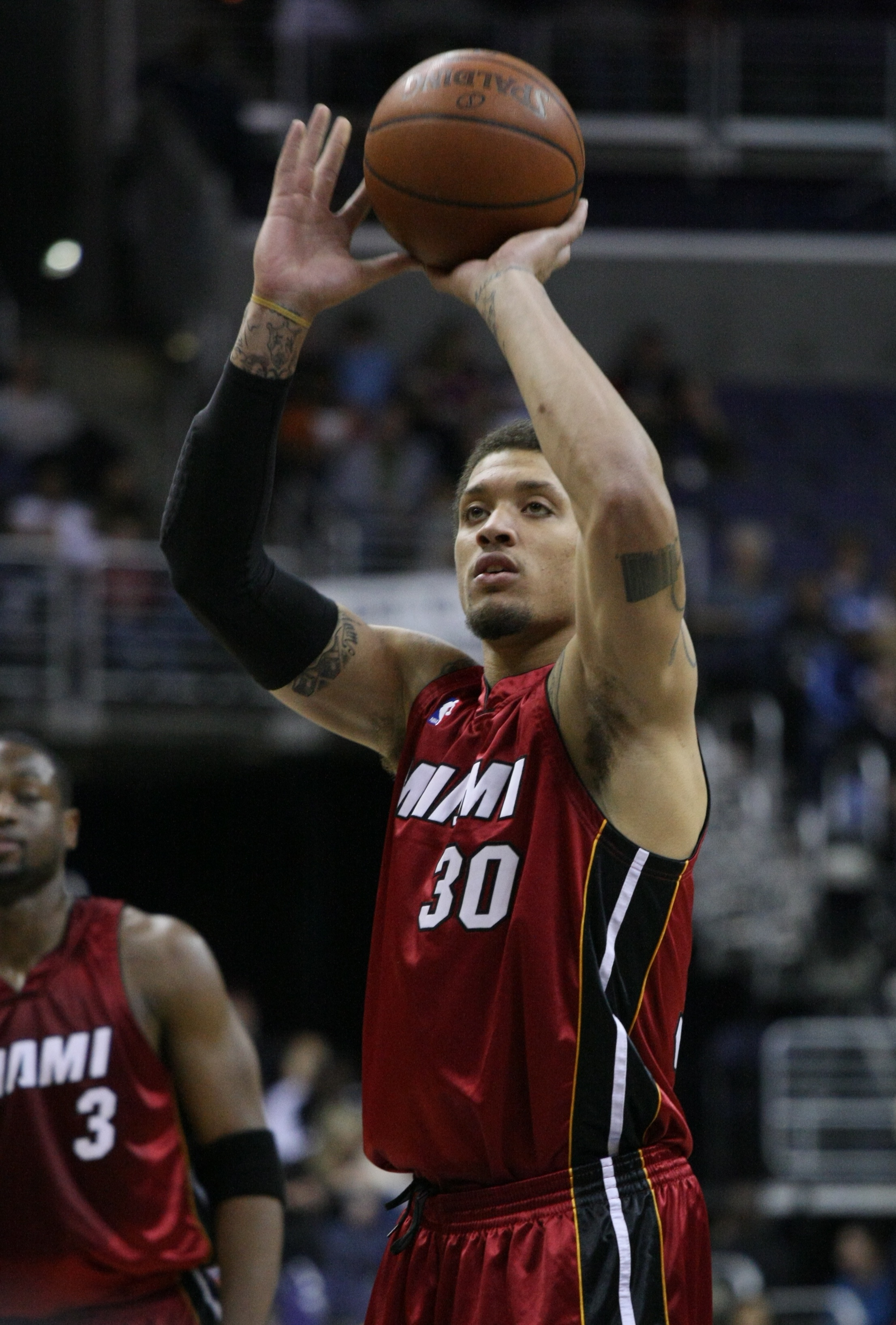
Michael Beasley was selected 2nd overall by the Miami Heat.

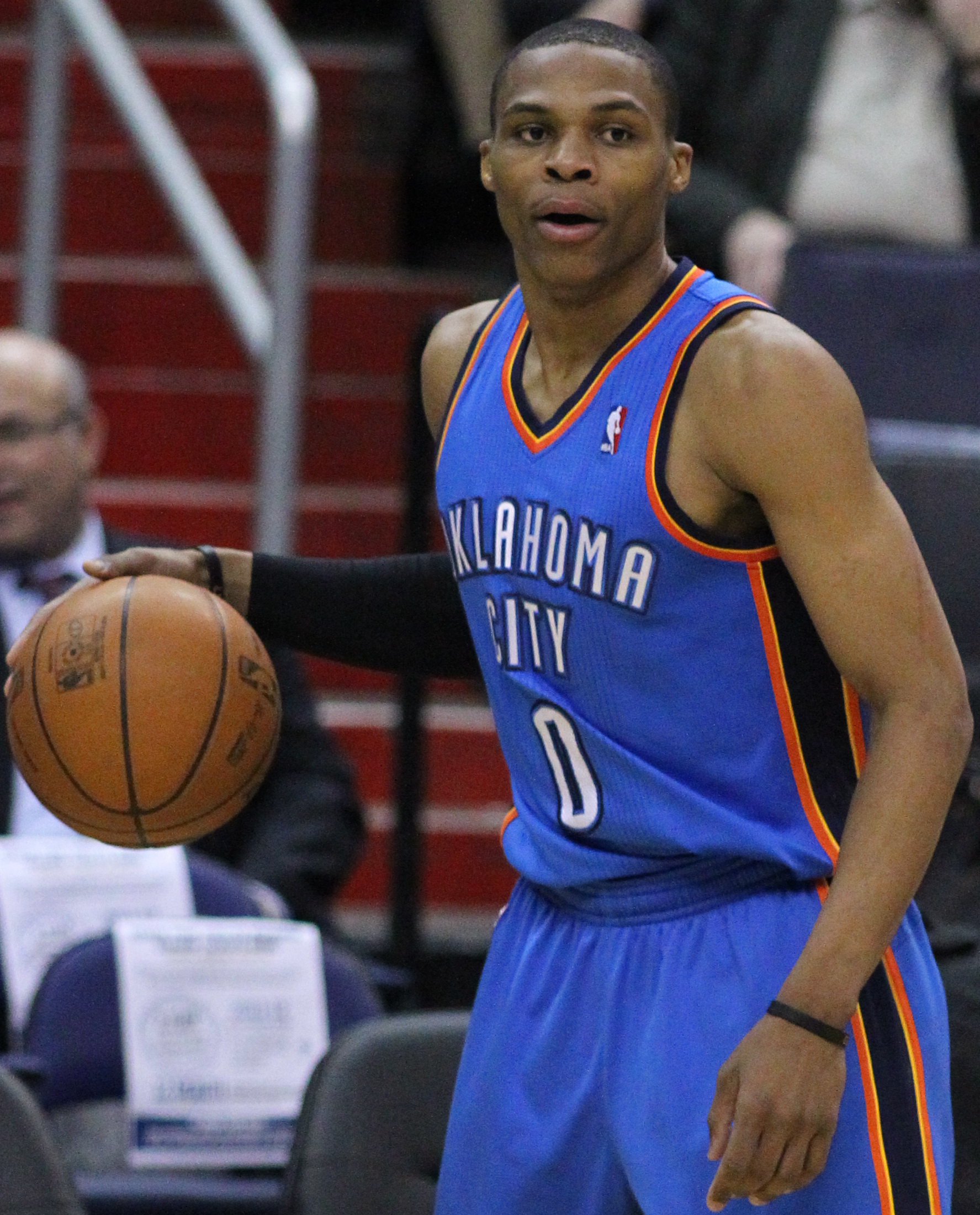
Russell Westbrook was selected 4th overall by the Seattle SuperSonics (became the Oklahoma City Thunder during the offseason).

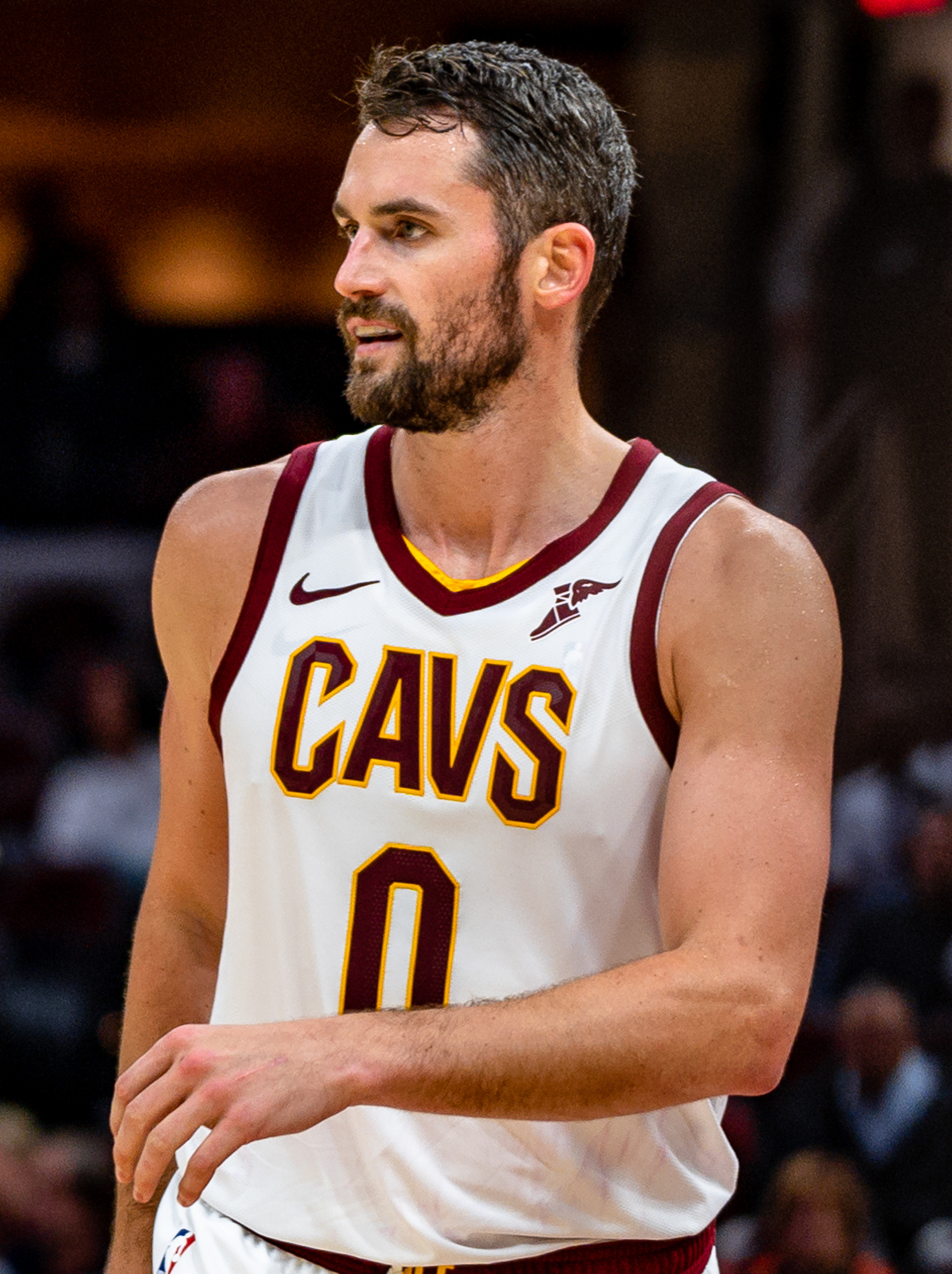
Kevin Love was selected 5th overall by the Memphis Grizzlies (traded to the Minnesota Timberwolves).

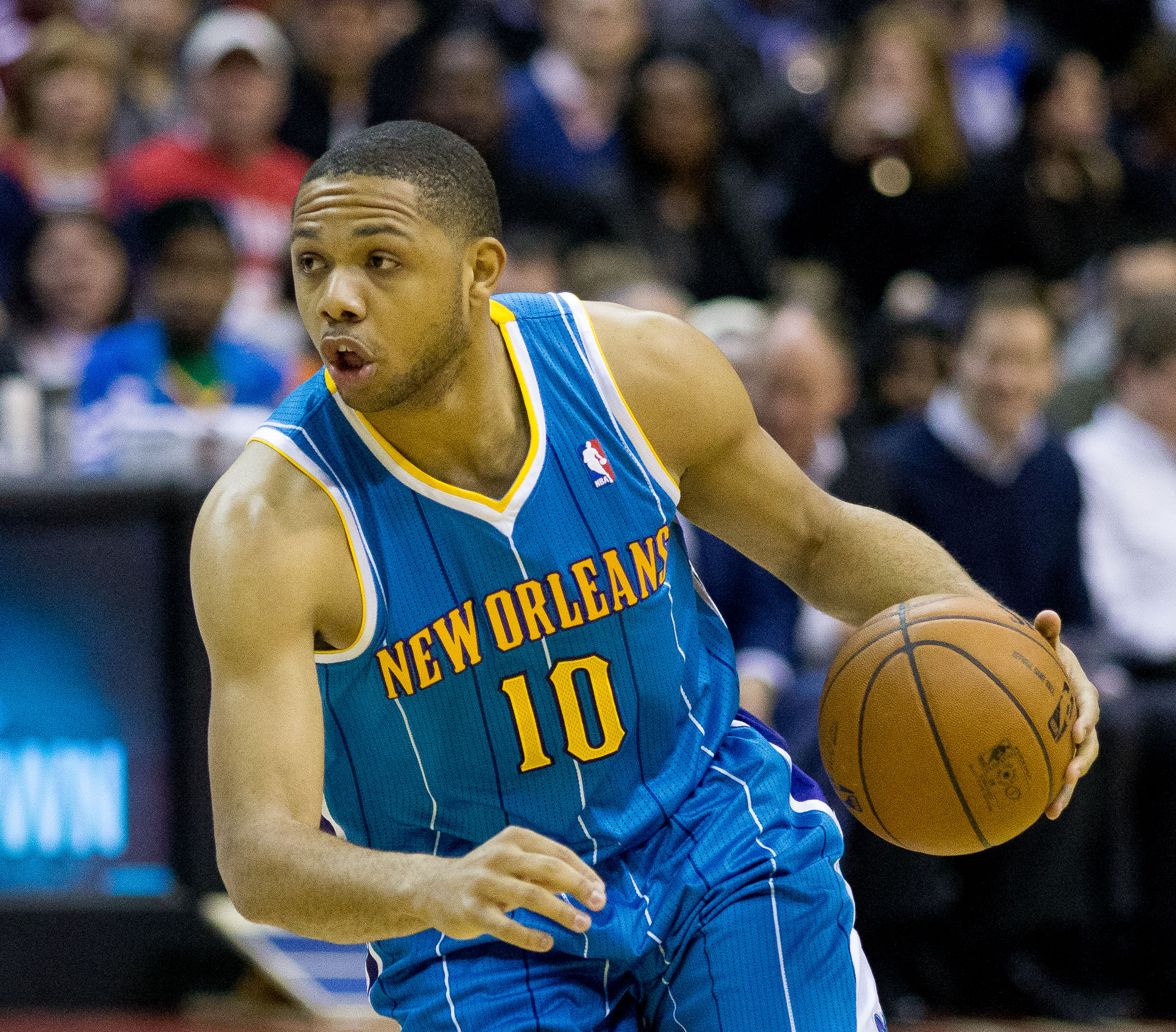
Eric Gordon was selected 7th by the Los Angeles Clippers.

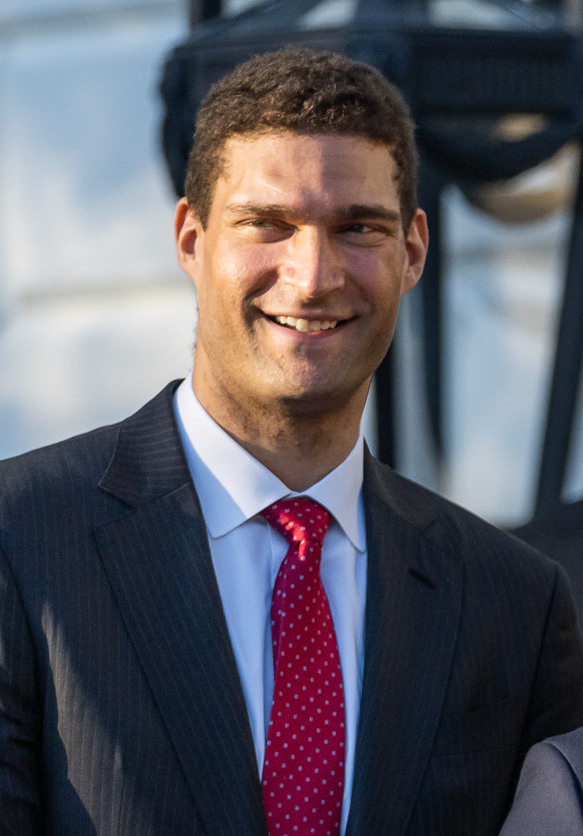
Brook Lopez was selected 10th by the New Jersey Nets.

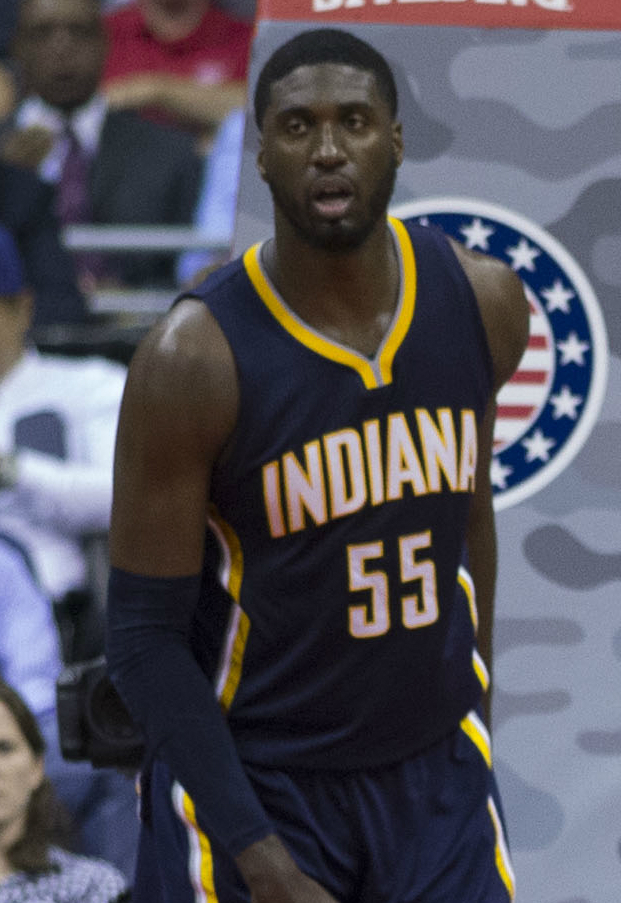
Roy Hibbert was selected 17th overall by the Toronto Raptors (traded to the Indiana Pacers).

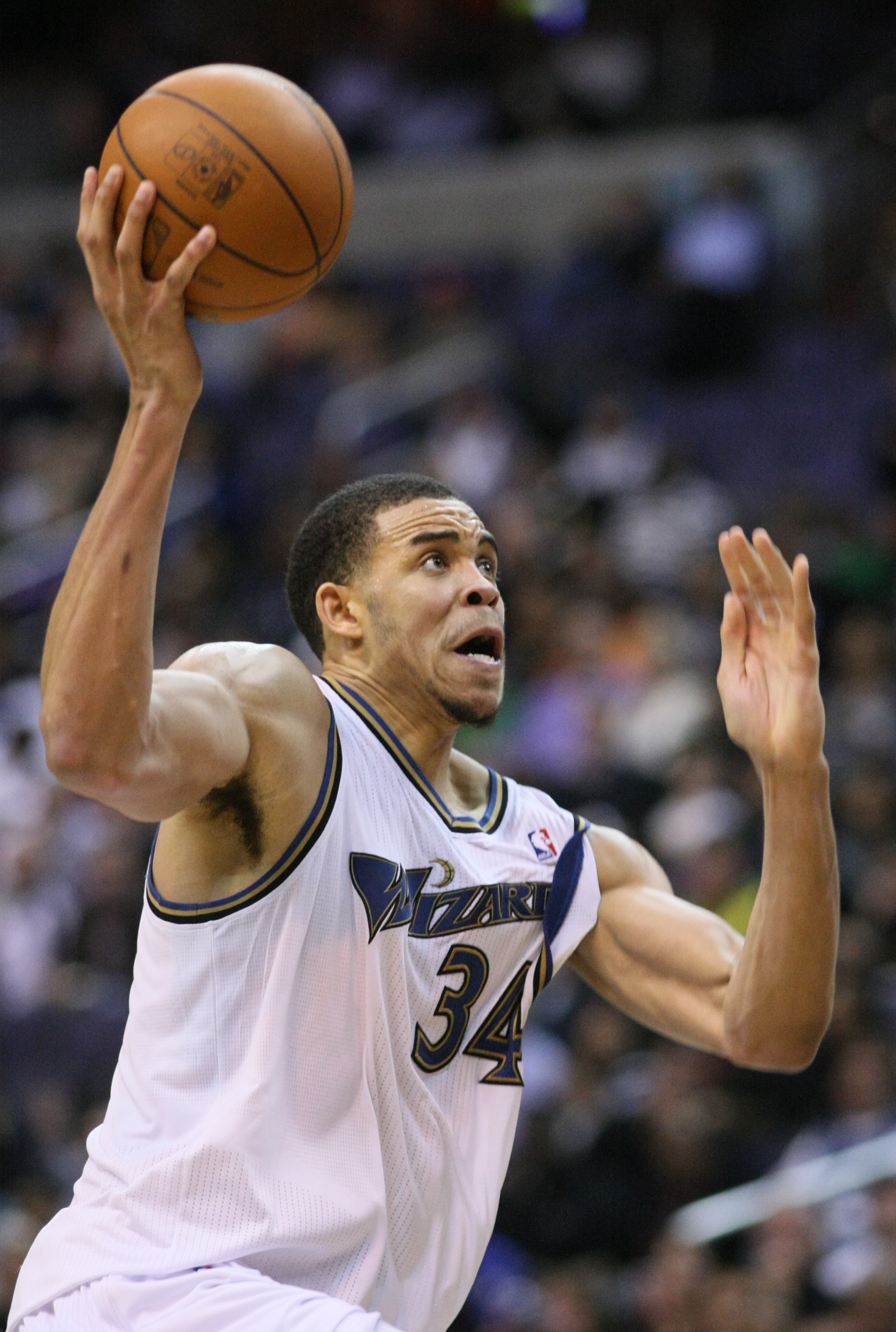
JaVale McGee was selected 18th overall by the Washington Wizards.

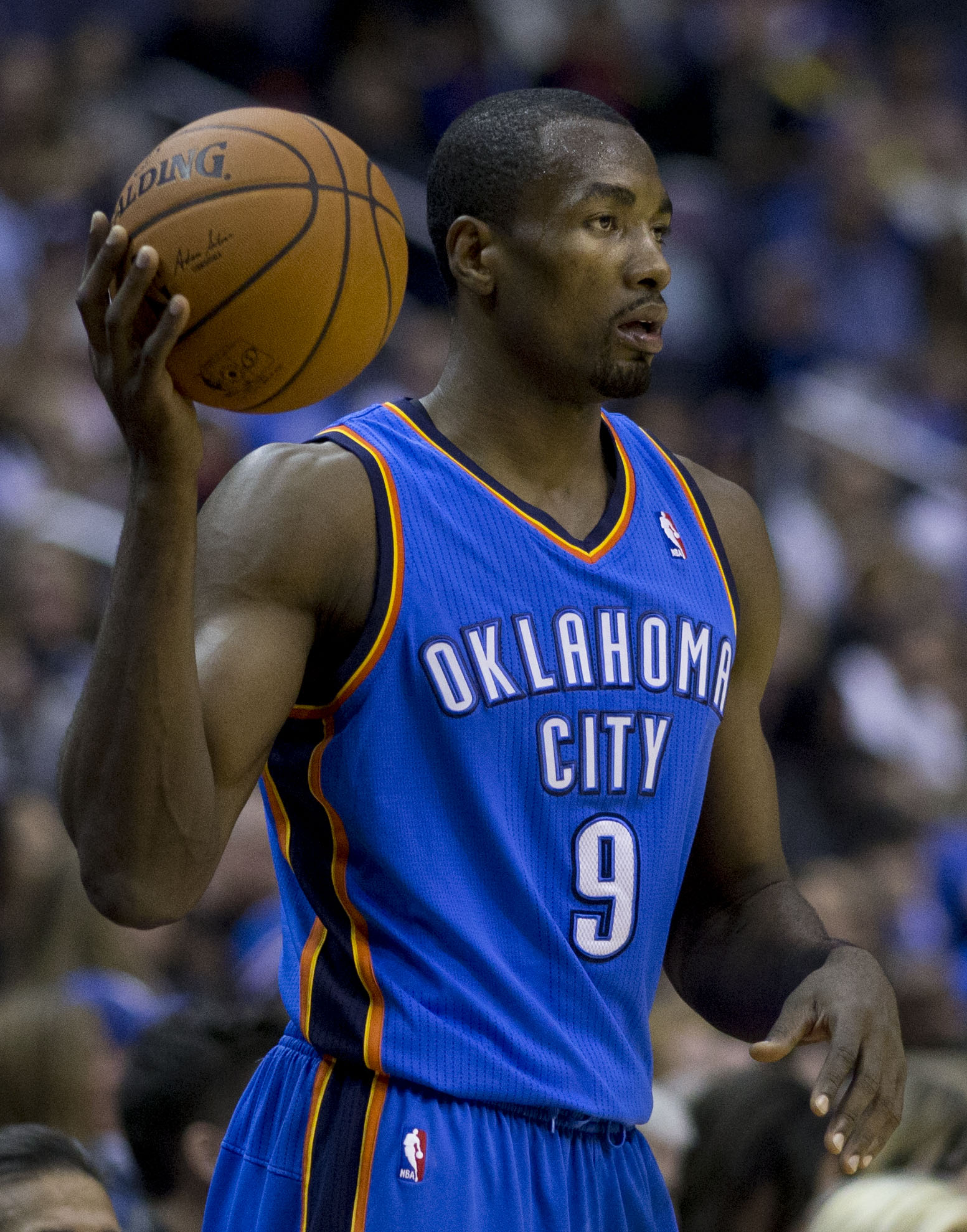
Serge Ibaka was selected 24th overall by the Seattle SuperSonics.

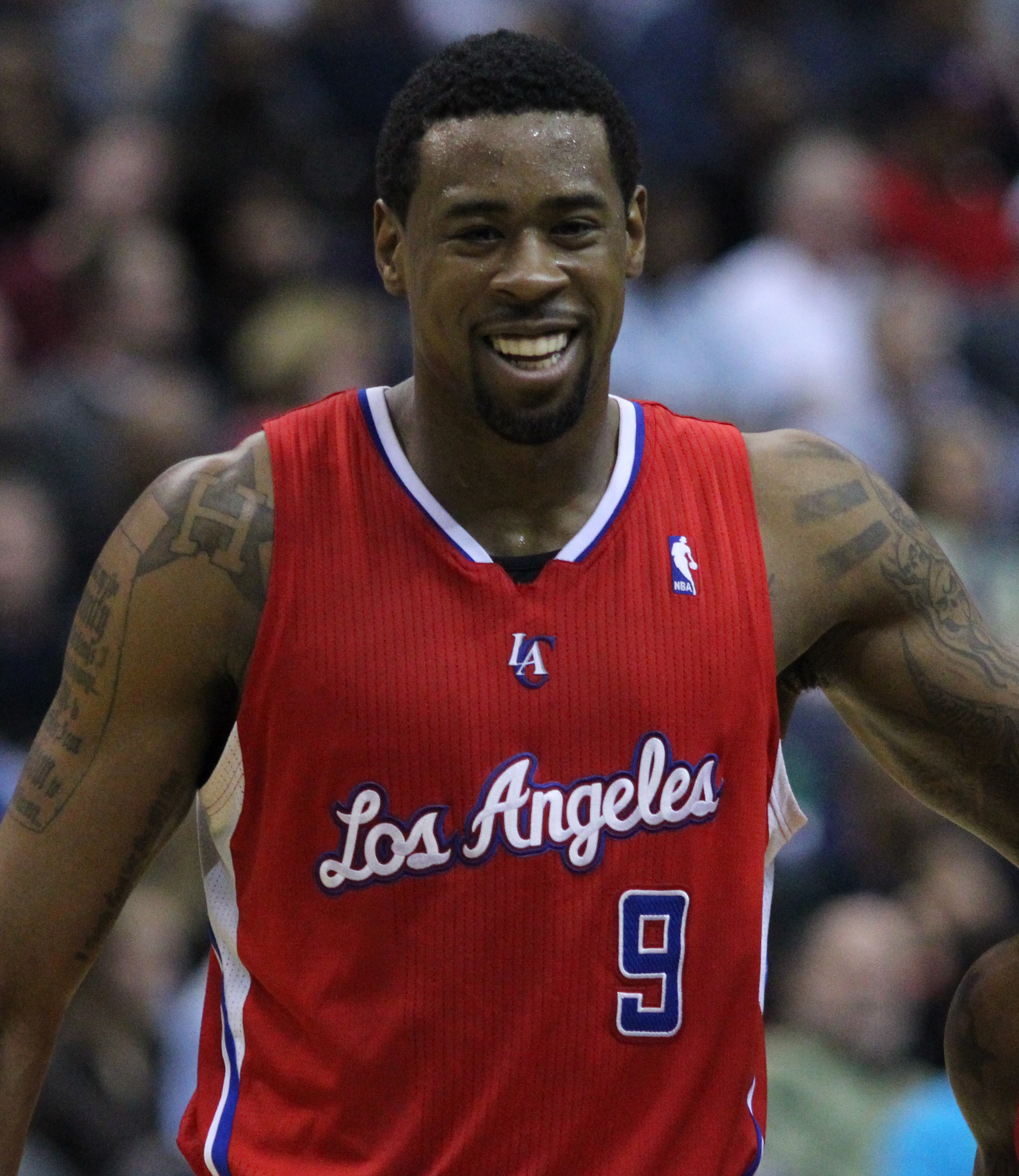
DeAndre Jordan was selected 35th overall by the Los Angeles Clippers.

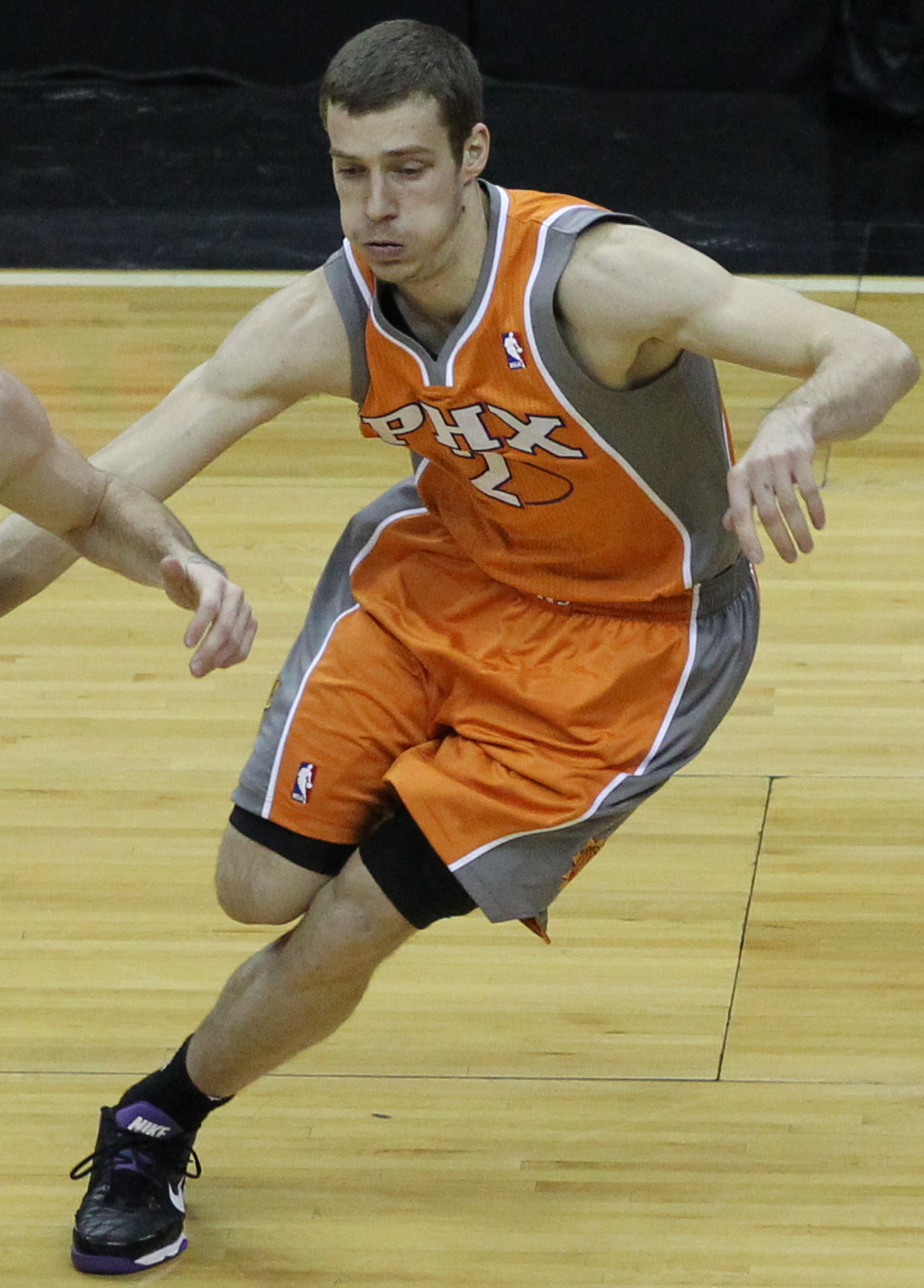
Goran Dragić was selected 45th overall by the San Antonio Spurs (traded to the Phoenix Suns).

Round	Pick	Player	Position	Nationality (Note: Nationality indicates the player's national team or representative nationality. If a player has not competed at the international level, then the nationality indicates the national team which the player is eligible to represent according to FIBA rules.)	Team	School/club team
1	1	Derrick Rose^{*~}	PG	United States	Chicago Bulls	Memphis (Fr.)
1	2	Michael Beasley	PF	United States	Miami Heat	Kansas State (Fr.)
1	3	O. J. Mayo	SG	United States	Minnesota Timberwolves (traded to Memphis)^{[a]}	USC (Fr.)
1	4	Russell Westbrook*	PG	United States	Seattle SuperSonics	UCLA (So.)
1	5	Kevin Love*	PF	United States	Memphis Grizzlies (traded to Minnesota)^{[a]}	UCLA (Fr.)
1	6	Danilo Gallinari	PF	Italy	New York Knicks	Olimpia Milano (Italy)
1	7	Eric Gordon	SG	United States	Los Angeles Clippers	Indiana (Fr.)
1	8	Joe Alexander	SF	United States	Milwaukee Bucks	West Virginia (Jr.)
1	9	D. J. Augustin	PG	United States	Charlotte Bobcats	Texas (So.)
1	10	Brook Lopez^{+}	C	United States	New Jersey Nets	Stanford (So.)
1	11	Jerryd Bayless	PG	United States	Indiana Pacers (traded to Portland)^{[b]}	Arizona (Fr.)
1	12	Jason Thompson	PF	United States	Sacramento Kings	Rider (Sr.)
1	13	Brandon Rush	SG	United States	Portland Trail Blazers (traded to Indiana)^{[b]}	Kansas (Jr.)
1	14	Anthony Randolph	PF	United States	Golden State Warriors	LSU (Fr.)
1	15	Robin Lopez	C	United States	Phoenix Suns (from Atlanta)^{[n]}	Stanford (So.)
1	16	Marreese Speights	PF	United States	Philadelphia 76ers	Florida (So.)
1	17	Roy Hibbert^{+}	C	Jamaica	Toronto Raptors (traded to Indiana)^{[c]}	Georgetown (Sr.)
1	18	JaVale McGee	C	United States	Washington Wizards	Nevada (So.)
1	19	JJ Hickson	PF	United States	Cleveland Cavaliers	NC State (Fr.)
1	20	Alexis Ajinça	C	France	Charlotte Bobcats (from Denver)^{[o]}	Hyères-Toulon (France)
1	21	Ryan Anderson	PF	United States	New Jersey Nets (from Dallas)^{[p]}	California (So.)
1	22	Courtney Lee	SG	United States	Orlando Magic	Western Kentucky (Sr.)
1	23	Kosta Koufos	C	Greece	Utah Jazz	Ohio State (Fr.)
1	24	Serge Ibaka	PF/C	Republic of the Congo	Seattle SuperSonics (from Phoenix)^{[q]}	L'Hospitalet (Spain)
1	25	Nicolas Batum	SF	France	Houston Rockets (traded to Portland)^{[d]}	Le Mans (France)
1	26	George Hill	PG	United States	San Antonio Spurs	IUPUI (Jr.)
1	27	Darrell Arthur	PF	United States	New Orleans Hornets (traded to Memphis via Portland)^{[d]}^{[e]}	Kansas (So.)
1	28	Donté Greene	SF	United States	Memphis Grizzlies (from LA Lakers^{[r]}, traded to Houston)^{[d]}	Syracuse (Fr.)
1	29	D. J. White	PF	United States	Detroit Pistons (traded to Seattle)^{[f]}	Indiana (Sr.)
1	30	J. R. Giddens	SG	United States	Boston Celtics	New Mexico (Sr.)
2	31	Nikola Peković	C	Montenegro	Minnesota Timberwolves (from Miami via Boston)^{[s]}	Partizan (Serbia)
2	32	Walter Sharpe	PF	United States	Seattle SuperSonics (traded to Detroit)^{[f]}	UAB (Jr.)
2	33	Joey Dorsey	PF	United States	Portland Trail Blazers (from Memphis^{[t]}, traded to Houston)^{[d]}	Memphis (Sr.)
2	34	Mario Chalmers	PG	United States	Minnesota Timberwolves (traded to Miami)^{[g]}	Kansas (Jr.)
2	35	DeAndre Jordan*	C	United States	Los Angeles Clippers	Texas A&M (Fr.)
2	36	Ömer Aşık	C	Turkey	Portland Trail Blazers (from New York^{[u]}, traded to Chicago)^{[h]}	Fenerbahçe Ülker (Turkey)
2	37	Luc Mbah a Moute	SF	Cameroon	Milwaukee Bucks	UCLA (Jr.)
2	38	Kyle Weaver	SG	United States	Charlotte Bobcats (traded to Seattle)	Washington State (Sr.)
2	39	Sonny Weems	SG	United States	Chicago Bulls (traded to Denver)^{[h]}	Arkansas (Sr.)
2	40	Chris Douglas-Roberts	SG	United States	New Jersey Nets	Memphis (Jr.)
2	41	Nathan Jawai	PF	Australia	Indiana Pacers (traded to Toronto)^{[c]}	Cairns Taipans (Australia)
2	42	Sean Singletary	PG	United States	Sacramento Kings (from Atlanta)^{[v]}	Virginia (Sr.)
2	43	Patrick Ewing Jr.	SF	Jamaica	Sacramento Kings	Georgetown (Sr.)
2	44	Ante Tomić^{#}	C	Croatia	Utah Jazz (from Philadelphia)^{[w]}	KK Zagreb (Croatia)
2	45	Goran Dragić^{*}	PG	Slovenia	San Antonio Spurs (from Toronto^{[x]}, traded to Phoenix)^{[i]}	Union Olimpija (Slovenia)
2	46	Trent Plaisted^{#}	PF	United States	Seattle SuperSonics (from Portland via Boston^{[y]}, traded to Detroit)^{[f]}	BYU (Jr.)
2	47	Bill Walker	SG	United States	Washington Wizards (traded to Boston)^{[j]}	Kansas State (Fr.)
2	48	Malik Hairston	SG	United States	Phoenix Suns (from Cleveland^{[z]}, traded to San Antonio)^{[i]}	Oregon (Sr.)
2	49	Richard Hendrix^{#}	PF	United States	Golden State Warriors	Alabama (Jr.)
2	50	DeVon Hardin^{#}	C	United States	Seattle SuperSonics (from Denver)^{[aa]}	California ([Sr.)
2	51	Shan Foster^{#}	SG	United States	Dallas Mavericks	Vanderbilt (Sr.)
2	52	Darnell Jackson	PF	United States	Miami Heat (from Orlando^{[ab]}, traded to Cleveland)^{[k]}	Kansas (Sr.)
2	53	Tadija Dragićević^{#}	PF	Serbia	Utah Jazz	Red Star Belgrade (Serbia)
2	54	Maarty Leunen^{#}	PF	United States	Houston Rockets^{[ac]}	Oregon (Sr.)
2	55	Mike Taylor	PG	United States	Portland Trail Blazers (from Phoenix via Indiana^{[ad]}, traded to LA Clippers)^{[l]}	Idaho Stampede (D-League)
2	56	Sasha Kaun	C	Russia	Seattle SuperSonics (from New Orleans via Houston^{[ae]}, traded to Cleveland)^{[m]}	Kansas (Sr.)
2	57	James Gist^{#}	PF	United States	San Antonio Spurs	Maryland (Sr.)
2	58	Joe Crawford	SG	United States	Los Angeles Lakers	Kentucky (Sr.)
2	59	Deron Washington^{#}	SF	United States	Detroit Pistons	Virginia Tech (Sr.)
2	60	Semih Erden	C	Turkey	Boston Celtics	Fenerbahçe Ülker (Turkey)

a: The franchise relocated to become the Oklahoma City Thunder in July 2008.
b: Eric Gordon was born in the United States to a Bahamian mother. He represented the United States when playing for Team U.S.A. in the 2010 FIBA World Championship. However, Gordon was permitted by FIBA on August 7, 2023 to play for The Bahamas instead, starting with the 2024 Olympics Pre-Qualifying Tournament for the Americas.
c: Anthony Randolph was born in West Germany to American parents and was raised in the United States. He became a naturalized citizen of Slovenia in 2017 and he has represented Slovenia internationally.
d: Roy Hibbert was born in the United States to a Jamaican father and a Trinidadian mother. He had represented the United States internationally at youth level in 2007. Since 2010, he has represented Jamaica internationally.
e: Kosta Koufos was born and raised in the United States to Greek parents. He has represented Greece internationally.
f: Serge Ibaka, who was born in Congo, became a naturalized citizen of Spain in 2011. He has represented Spain internationally since 2011.
g: Donté Greene was born in West Germany to American parents. He has represented the United States internationally at youth level.
h: James Gist was born in Turkey to American parents.

== Notable undrafted players ==
These players were not selected in the 2008 NBA Draft but have played in the NBA.

Player	Position	Nationality	School/club team
Gary Forbes	SF	Panama	UMass (Sr.)
Sundiata Gaines	PG	United States	Georgia (Sr.)
Trey Gilder	SF	United States	Northwestern State (Sr.)
Mickell Gladness	C	United States	Alabama A&M (Sr.)
Steven Hill	PF	United States	Arkansas (Sr.)
Othello Hunter	F	United States	Ohio State (Sr.)
Othyus Jeffers	SG	United States	Robert Morris (IL) (Sr.)
Rob Kurz	SF	United States	Notre Dame (Sr.)
Salah Mejri	C	Tunisia	Étoile Sportive du Sahel (Tunisia)
Gal Mekel	PG	Israel	Wichita State (So.)
Anthony Morrow	SG	United States	Georgia Tech (Sr.)
Timofey Mozgov	C	Russia	Khimki Moscow (Russia)
DeMarcus Nelson	PG	United States	Duke (Sr.)
Brian Roberts	PG	United States	Dayton (Sr.)
Damjan Rudež	F	Croatia	KK Split (Croatia)
Greg Stiemsma	C	United States	Wisconsin (Sr.)
Reggie Williams	SF	United States	VMI (Sr.)

== Draft lottery ==
The first 14 picks in the draft belonged to teams that had missed the playoffs; the order was determined through a lottery. The lottery determined the three teams that would obtain the first three picks on the draft. The remaining first-round picks and the second-round picks were assigned to teams in reverse order of their win–loss record in the previous season. As it is commonplace in the event of identical win–loss records, the NBA performed a random drawing to break the ties on April 18, 2008.

The lottery was held on May 20, 2008, in Secaucus, New Jersey. The Chicago Bulls, who had the ninth-worst record, won the lottery with just a 1.7% chance to win. The Miami Heat and Minnesota Timberwolves, with the worst and third-worst records, respectively, won the second and third picks.

Below were the chances for each team to get specific picks in the 2008 draft lottery, rounded to three decimal places:

^	Denotes the actual lottery results

Team	2007–08 record	Lottery chances	Pick													
Team	2007–08 record	Lottery chances	1st	2nd	3rd	4th	5th	6th	7th	8th	9th	10th	11th	12th	13th	14th
Miami Heat	15–67	250	.250	.215^	.177	.358	—	—	—	—	—	—	—	—	—	—
Seattle SuperSonics	20–62	199	.199	.188	.171	.319^	.124	—	—	—	—	—	—	—	—	—
Minnesota Timberwolves	22–60	138	.138	.142	.145^	.238	.290	.045	—	—	—	—	—	—	—	—
Memphis Grizzlies	22–60	137	.137	.142	.145	.085	.323^	.156	.013	—	—	—	—	—	—	—
New York Knicks	23–59	76	.076	.084	.095	—	.262	.385^	.093	.004	—	—	—	—	—	—
Los Angeles Clippers	23–59	75	.075	.083	.094	—	—	.414	.294^	.039	.001	—	—	—	—	—
Milwaukee Bucks	26–56	43	.043	.049	.058	—	—	—	.600	.232^	.018	.000	—	—	—	—
Charlotte Bobcats	32–50	28	.028	.033	.039	—	—	—	—	.725	.168^	.006	.000	—	—	—
Chicago Bulls	33–49	17	.017^	.020	.024	—	—	—	—	—	.813	.122	.004	.000	—	—
New Jersey Nets	34–48	11	.011	.013	.016	—	—	—	—	—	—	.870^	.089	.002	.000	—
Indiana Pacers	36–46	8	.008	.009	.012	—	—	—	—	—	—	—	.908^	.063	.001	.000
Sacramento Kings	38–44	7	.007	.008	.010	—	—	—	—	—	—	—	—	.935^	.039	.000
Portland Trail Blazers	41–41	6	.006	.007	.009	—	—	—	—	—	—	—	—	—	.960^	.018
Golden State Warriors	48–34	5	.005	.006	.007	—	—	—	—	—	—	—	—	—	—	.982^

== Eligibility ==
=== Early entrants ===
==== College underclassmen ====
The following college basketball players successfully applied for early draft entrance.

- (United States) Joe Alexander – F, West Virginia (junior)
- (United States) Ryan Anderson – F, California (sophomore)
- (United States) Darrell Arthur – F, Kansas (sophomore)
- (United States) D. J. Augustin – G, Texas (sophomore)
- (United States) Jerryd Bayless – G, Arizona (freshman)
- (United States) Michael Beasley – F, Kansas State (freshman)
- (United States) Keith Brumbaugh – F, Hillsborough CC (sophomore)
- (United States) Mario Chalmers – G, Kansas (junior)
- (United States) Chris Douglas-Roberts – G, Memphis (junior)
- (United States) C. J. Giles – C, Oregon State (junior)
- (United States) Eric Gordon – G, Indiana (freshman)
- (United States) Jamont Gordon – G, Mississippi State (junior)
- (United States) Donté Greene – F, Syracuse (freshman)
- (United States) Kalem Grimes – F, Missouri (junior)
- (United States) Richard Hendrix – F, Alabama (junior)
- (United States) JJ Hickson – F, NC State (freshman)
- (United States) George Hill – G, IUPUI (junior)
- (United States) Reggie Huffman – F, UAB (junior)
- (Guyana) / (United States) Shawn James – F, Duquesne (junior)
- (United States) Davon Jefferson – F, USC (freshman)
- (United States) DeAndre Jordan – C, Texas A&M (freshman)
- (Greece) / (United States) Kosta Koufos – F/C, Ohio State (freshman)
- (United States) Brook Lopez – C, Stanford (sophomore)
- (United States) Robin Lopez – C, Stanford (sophomore)
- (United States) Kevin Love – F, UCLA (freshman)
- (United States) O. J. Mayo – G, USC (freshman)
- (Cameroon) Luc Mbah a Moute – F, UCLA (junior)
- (United States) JaVale McGee – C, Nevada (sophomore)
- (United States) Kojo Mensah – G, Duquesne (sophomore)
- (United States) Trent Plaisted – C, BYU (junior)
- (United States) Bruce Price – G, Tennessee State (junior)
- (United States) Anthony Randolph – F, LSU (freshman)
- (United States) JaJuan Robinson – G, Lincoln (Pennsylvania) (freshman)
- (United States) Derrick Rose – G, Memphis (freshman)
- (United States) Brandon Rush – G, Kansas (junior)
- (United States) Walter Sharpe – F, UAB (junior)
- (United States) Marreese Speights – F, Florida (sophomore)
- (United States) Bill Walker – F, Kansas State (freshman)
- (United States) Russell Westbrook – G, UCLA (sophomore)

==== International players ====
The following international players successfully applied for early draft entrance.

- Alexis Ajinça – C, Hyères-Toulon (France)
- Nicolas Batum – F, Le Mans (France)
- Danilo Gallinari – F, Olimpia Milano (Italy)
- (Republic of the Congo) / Serge Ibaka – F, L'Hospitalet (Spain)
- Ante Tomić – KK Zagreb (Croatia)

=== Automatically eligible entrants ===
Players who do not meet the criteria for "international" players are automatically eligible if they meet any of the following criteria:

- They have no remaining college eligibility.
- If they graduated from high school in the U.S., but did not enroll in a U.S. college or university, four years have passed since their high school class graduated.
- They have signed a contract with a professional basketball team not in the NBA, anywhere in the world, and have played under the contract.

Players who meet the criteria for "international" players are automatically eligible if they meet any of the following criteria:

- They are at least 22 years old during the calendar year of the draft. In term of dates players born on or before December 31, 1986, were automatically eligible for the 2008 draft.
- They have signed a contract with a professional basketball team not in the NBA within the United States, and have played under that contract.

Other automatically eligible players
Player	Team	Note	Ref.
(Australia) Ryan Kersten	New Zealand Breakers (Australia)	Left New Mexico in 2007; playing professionally since the 2007–08 season	
(Netherlands) Robert Krabbendam	ABC Amsterdam (The Netherlands)	Left Virginia Tech in 2007; playing professionally since the 2007–08 season	
(Australia) Damian Martin	West Sydney Razorbacks (Australia)	Left Loyola Marymount in 2007; playing professionally since the 2007–08 season	
(United States) Mike Taylor	Idaho Stampede (NBA Development League)	Left Iowa State in 2007; playing professionally since the 2007–08 season	

This year marked the first time a player that came from the NBA Development League (since rebranded as the NBA G League) would enter into the NBA draft while in that minor league.

== Invited attendees ==
The 2008 NBA draft is considered to be the 30th NBA draft to have utilized what is properly considered the "green room" experience for NBA prospects. The NBA's green room is a staging area where anticipated draftees often sit with their families and representatives, waiting for their names to be called on draft night. Often being positioned either in front of or to the side of the podium (in this case, being positioned somewhere within what was known at the time as the WaMu Theater at Madison Square Garden), once a player heard his name, he would walk to the podium to shake hands and take promotional photos with the NBA commissioner. From there, the players often conducted interviews with various media outlets while backstage. From there, the players often conducted interviews with various media outlets while backstage. However, once the NBA draft started to air nationally on TV starting with the 1980 NBA draft, the green room evolved from players waiting to hear their name called and then shaking hands with these select players who were often called to the hotel to take promotional pictures with the NBA commissioner a day or two after the draft concluded to having players in real-time waiting to hear their names called up and then shaking hands with David Stern, the NBA's commissioner at the time.

The NBA compiled its list of green room invites through collective voting by the NBA's team presidents and general managers alike, which in this year's case belonged to only what they believed were the top 16 prospects at the time. Despite the higher amount of invites for this year's draft when compared to the previous year's draft, there would still be some notable discrepancies involved with the invitations at hand between the missing invitation for the #12 pick, Thaddeus Young, to showcase the perfect top 15 invitation listing this year, future All-Star and All-NBA Team member DeAndre Jordan dropping down into the second round alongside Darrell Arthur going near the end of the first round, and arguably missing invitations for future All-Star Roy Hibbert and arguably future All-Star and All-NBA Team member Goran Dragić to go with DeAndre Jordan's inclusion for good measure. With that in mind, the following players were invited to attend this year's draft festivities live and in person.

- (Taiwan) / (United States) / (Israel) Joe Alexander – PF, West Virginia
- (United States) Darrell Arthur – PF, Kansas
- (United States) D. J. Augustin – PG, Texas
- (United States) Jerryd Bayless – PG/SG, Arizona
- (United States) Michael Beasley – SF/PF, Kansas State
- Danilo Gallinari – SF/PF, Armani Jeans Milano (Italy)
- (United States) / (The Bahamas) Eric Gordon – SG, Indiana
- (United States) DeAndre Jordan – C, Texas A&M
- (United States) Brook Lopez – C, Stanford
- (United States) Robin Lopez – C, Stanford
- (United States) Kevin Love – PF, UCLA
- (United States) O. J. Mayo – SG, USC
- (United States) Anthony Randolph – PF/C, LSU
- (United States) Derrick Rose – PG, Memphis
- (United States) Brandon Rush – SG/SF, Kansas
- (United States) Russell Westbrook – PG, UCLA

== Trades involving draft picks ==
=== Draft-day trades ===
The following trades involving drafted players were made on the day of the draft.

- ^{a 1} ^{2} Memphis acquired the draft rights to 3rd pick O. J. Mayo, along with Marko Jarić, Antoine Walker, and Greg Buckner, from Minnesota in exchange for the draft rights to 5th pick Kevin Love, along with Mike Miller, Brian Cardinal, and Jason Collins.
- ^{b 1} ^{2} Portland acquired the draft rights to 11th pick Jerryd Bayless and Ike Diogu from Indiana in exchange for the draft rights to 13th pick Brandon Rush, Jarrett Jack and Josh McRoberts. The trade was finalized on July 9, 2008.
- ^{c 1} ^{2} Toronto acquired Jermaine O'Neal and the draft rights to 41st pick Nathan Jawai from Indiana in exchange for T. J. Ford, Rasho Nesterovič, Maceo Baston, and the draft rights to 17th pick Roy Hibbert. The trade was finalized on July 9, 2008.
- ^{d 1} ^{2} ^{3} ^{4} In a three-team trade, Portland acquired the draft rights to 25th pick Nicolas Batum from Houston, Houston acquired the draft rights to 33rd pick Joey Dorsey from Portland and the draft rights to 28th pick Donté Greene and a 2009 second-round draft pick from Memphis, and Memphis acquired the draft rights to 27th pick Darrell Arthur from Portland.
- ^{e} Portland acquired the draft rights to 27th pick Darrell Arthur from New Orleans in exchange for cash considerations.
- ^{f 1} ^{2} ^{3} Detroit acquired the draft rights to 32nd pick Walter Sharpe and 46th pick Trent Plaisted from Seattle in exchange for the draft rights to 29th pick D. J. White.
- ^{g} Miami acquired the draft rights to 34th pick Mario Chalmers from Minnesota in exchange for two future second-round draft picks and cash considerations.
- ^{h 1} ^{2} In a three-team trade, Chicago acquired the draft rights to 36th pick Ömer Aşık from Portland, the Trail Blazers acquired a second-round draft pick in 2009 from Denver and two future second-round draft picks from Chicago, and Denver acquired the draft rights to 39th pick Sonny Weems from Chicago.
- ^{i 1} ^{2} San Antonio acquired the draft rights to 48th pick Malik Hairston, a second-round draft pick in 2009, and cash considerations from Phoenix in exchange for the draft rights to 45th pick Goran Dragić.
- ^{j} Boston acquired the draft rights to 47th pick Bill Walker from Washington in exchange for cash considerations.
- ^{k} Cleveland acquired the draft rights to 52nd pick Darnell Jackson from Miami in exchange for 2009 second-round draft pick.
- ^{l} The L.A. Clippers acquired the draft rights to 55th pick Mike Taylor from Portland in exchange for a 2009 second-round draft pick.
- ^{m} Cleveland acquired the draft rights to 56th pick Sasha Kaun from Seattle in exchange for cash considerations.

=== Pre-draft trades ===
Prior to the day of the draft, the following trades were made and resulted in exchanges of draft picks between the teams.

- ^{n} On August 19, 2005, Phoenix acquired 2006 and 2008 first-round draft picks and Boris Diaw from Atlanta in exchange for Joe Johnson. Phoenix used the pick to draft Robin Lopez.
- ^{o} On June 25, 2008, Charlotte acquired the 20th draft pick from Denver in exchange for a future conditional first-round draft pick. Charlotte used the pick to draft Alexis Ajinça.
- ^{p} On February 19, 2008, New Jersey acquired 2008 and 2010 first-round draft picks, Devin Harris, Trenton Hassell, Maurice Ager, DeSagana Diop, and Keith Van Horn from Dallas in exchange for Jason Kidd, Antoine Wright and Malik Allen. New Jersey used the pick to draft Ryan Anderson.
- ^{q} On July 20, 2007, Seattle acquired 2008 and 2010 first-round draft picks and Kurt Thomas from Phoenix in exchange for a 2009 second-round draft pick. Seattle used the pick to draft Serge Ibaka.
- ^{r} On February 1, 2008, Memphis acquired 2008 and 2010 first-round draft picks, the draft rights to Marc Gasol, Kwame Brown, Javaris Crittenton, and Aaron McKie from the L.A. Lakers in exchange for Pau Gasol and a 2010 second-round draft pick. Memphis used the pick to draft Donté Greene.
- ^{s} On January 26, 2006, Minnesota acquired Boston's 2006 and Miami's 2008 second-round draft picks, Ricky Davis, Marcus Banks, Justin Reed and Mark Blount from Boston in exchange for Wally Szczerbiak, Michael Olowokandi, Dwayne Jones and a future first-round draft pick. Previously, Boston acquired 2006 and 2008 second-round draft picks, Qyntel Woods and the draft rights to Albert Miralles from Miami in a five-team trade on August 8, 2005. Minnesota used the pick to draft Nikola Peković.
- ^{t} On June 28, 2006, Portland acquired a 2008 second-round draft pick from Memphis in exchange for the draft rights to Alexander Johnson. Portland used the pick to draft Joey Dorsey.
- ^{u} On June 28, 2007, Portland acquired a 2008 second-round draft pick, Steve Francis and Channing Frye from New York in exchange for Zach Randolph, Dan Dickau, Fred Jones and the draft rights to Demetris Nichols. Portland used the pick to draft Ömer Aşık.
- ^{v} On February 16, 2008, Sacramento acquired a 2008 second-round draft pick, Anthony Johnson, Tyronn Lue, Shelden Williams, and Lorenzen Wright from Atlanta in exchange for Mike Bibby. Sacramento used the pick to draft Sean Singletary.
- ^{w} On June 6, 2005, Utah acquired a 2008 second-round draft pick from Philadelphia in exchange for the 60th draft pick in the 2005 NBA draft. Utah used the pick to draft Ante Tomić.
- ^{x} On June 28, 2007, San Antonio acquired a 2008 second-round draft pick from Toronto in exchange for the draft rights to Giorgos Printezis. San Antonio used the pick to draft Goran Dragić.
- ^{y} On June 28, 2007, Seattle acquired Portland's 2008 second-round draft pick, Wally Szczerbiak, Delonte West and the draft rights to Jeff Green from Boston in exchange for Ray Allen and the draft rights to Glen Davis. Previously, Boston acquired a 2008 second-round draft pick, Sebastian Telfair and Theo Ratliff on June 28, 2006, from Portland in exchange for Raef LaFrentz, Dan Dickau and the draft rights to Randy Foye. Seattle used the pick to draft Trent Plaisted.
- ^{z} On September 17, 2002, Phoenix acquired a 2008 second-round draft pick from Cleveland in exchange for Milt Palacio. Phoenix used the pick to draft Malik Hairston.
- ^{aa} On February 23, 2006, Seattle acquired a 2008 second-round draft pick, Earl Watson and Bryon Russell from Denver in a four-team trade. Seattle used the pick to draft DeVon Hardin.
- ^{ab} On June 7, 2007, Miami acquired 2007 and 2008 second-round draft picks from Orlando as part of the hiring of Stan Van Gundy as Orlando's head coach. Miami used the pick to draft Darnell Jackson.
- ^{ac} On February 21, 2008, Houston re-acquired their 2008 second-round draft pick along with Bobby Jackson and Adam Haluska from New Orleans in a three-team trade. Previously, Houston and New Orleans agreed to exchange second-round draft picks in a trade that sent Kirk Snyder to Houston on July 14, 2006. Houston used the pick to draft Maarty Leunen.
- ^{ad} On June 28, 2006, Portland acquired Indiana's 2007 and Phoenix's 2008 second-round draft picks and the draft rights to Alexander Johnson from Indiana in exchange for the draft rights to James White. Previously, Indiana acquired a 2008 second-round draft pick on August 25, 2005, from Phoenix in exchange for James Jones. Portland used the pick to draft Mike Taylor.
- ^{ae} On June 28, 2007, Seattle acquired New Orleans' 2008 second-round draft pick and cash considerations from Houston in exchange for the draft rights to Carl Landry. Previously, Houston and New Orleans agreed to exchange second-round draft picks in a trade that sent Kirk Snyder to Houston on July 14, 2006. Seattle used the pick to draft Sasha Kaun.

== See also ==
- List of first overall NBA draft picks
