= Ryan Kersten =

Australian basketball player

Personal information
- Born: 21 April 1986 (age 40) Adelaide, South Australia, Australia
- Listed height: 185 cm (6 ft 1 in)
- Listed weight: 90 kg (198 lb)

Career information
- College: New Mexico (2005–2007)
- NBA draft: 2008: undrafted
- Position: Point guard

Career history
- 2007–2008: New Zealand Breakers
- 2008–2009: Adelaide 36ers

Ryan Kersten (born 21 April 1986) is an Australian former professional basketball player.

Kersten attended the Australian Institute of Sport (AIS). In 2004, he averaged 8.5 points per game, while in 2005, he averaged 10.2.

In 2005-06, Kersten attended college at the University of New Mexico in America, averaging 4.7 points per game and 1.6 assists per game, starting in 15 matches. He established a career high of 16 points while playing against UT-Arlington. He was later named to the 2005 Comcast Lobo Invitational All-Tournament team. On 12 March 2007, it was announced that Kersten had left the team to return home.

On 6 April 2007, Kersten signed with the New Zealand Breakers of the Australian National Basketball League (NBL). He played with the Adelaide 36ers of the NBL during the 2008–09 season.
