= Uche Nsonwu-Amadi =

Nigerian basketball player (born 1978)

Personal information
- Born: 17 January 1978 (age 48) Enugu, Nigeria
- Listed height: 6 ft 11 in (2.11 m)
- Listed weight: 260 lb (118 kg)

Career information
- College: Indian Hills CC (1998–1999); Wyoming (2000–2003)
- NBA draft: 2003: undrafted
- Playing career: 2003–2014
- Position: Center

Career history
- 2003: Galatasaray
- 2003–2004: Antibes
- 2004–2005: Oostende
- 2005–2006: Hapoel Galil Elyon
- 2006–2007: BCM Gravelines
- 2007–2008: ASVEL
- 2008–2009: Azovmash
- 2009–2012: Chorale Roanne
- 2012–2014: ASVEL

Career highlights
- French Cup winner (2008); 2× LNB All-Star (2008, 2010); First-team All-Mountain West (2003); 2× Second-team All-Mountain West (2001, 2002); Mountain West Newcomer of the Year (2001); Mountain West Newcomer team (2001)

Uchenna Nsonwu-Amadi (né Nsonwu; born 17 January 1978) is a Nigerian former professional basketball player. He played college basketball in the United States for the Wyoming Cowboys. Nsonwu-Amadi played professionally overseas in Turkey, France, Belgium, Israel and Ukraine.

== Early life ==
Nsonwu-Amadi is a native of Enugu, Nigeria, where he competed in basketball and soccer. He added Amadi, a family name, to his surname when he moved to the United States.

== College career ==
Nsonwu-Amadi played at Indian Hills Community College during the 1998–99 season and averaged 4.2 points per game. He transferred to play for the Wyoming Cowboys and sat out the 1999–2000 season. Nsonwu-Amadi's second cousin, Ugo Udezue, also played for the Cowboys.

Nsonwu-Amadi averaged 11.8 points and 8.3 rebounds per game during his first season with the Cowboys. He was selected as the Mountain West Conference Newcomer of the Year in 2001. Nsonwu-Amadi averaged 10.2 points and 8.2 rebounds per game during the 2001–02 season. On 22 April 2002, Nsonwu-Amadi declared for the 2002 NBA draft for the purpose of exposing himself to the National Basketball Association (NBA) but expected that he would return to Wyoming for his senior season and did not hire an agent. On 18 June, Nsonwu-Amadi withdrew from the draft. He averaged 14.2 points and a team-high 9.6 rebounds during the 2002–03 season. Nsonwu-Amadi was selected to the All-Mountain West first-team in 2003.

Nsonwu-Amadi finished his Cowboys career with 1,053 points and 763 rebounds. His career average of 8.7 rebounds per game was fourth-best in program history at the time of his graduation.

== Professional career ==
Nsonwu-Amadi worked out for the Memphis Grizzlies and Orlando Magic prior to the 2003 NBA draft. After he went undrafted, he was invited by the Grizzlies to join their NBA Summer League roster.

Nsonwu-Amadi began his professional career with Galatasaray but left the team in November 2003. In December 2003, he signed with Antibes of the LNB Pro B. Nsonwu-Amadi spent one season each with Oostende in Belgium, Hapoel Galil Elyon in Israel, and BCM Gravelines in France. He played for ASVEL in France during the 2007–08 season where he won the French Cup, and was selected to play in the LNB All-Star Game. He played for Azovmash in Ukraine for the 2008–09 season, but left the team due to financial difficulties. In February 2009, Nsonwu-Amadi signed with Chorale Roanne as a replacement for Taj Gray and averaged 13 points per game. In March, his contract with Chorale Roanne was extended. Nsonwu-Amadi was selected to play in the LNB All-Star Game for a second time in 2010. In 2012, Nsonwu-Amadi signed with ASVEL for a second stint.
