= Trent Plaisted =

American basketball player

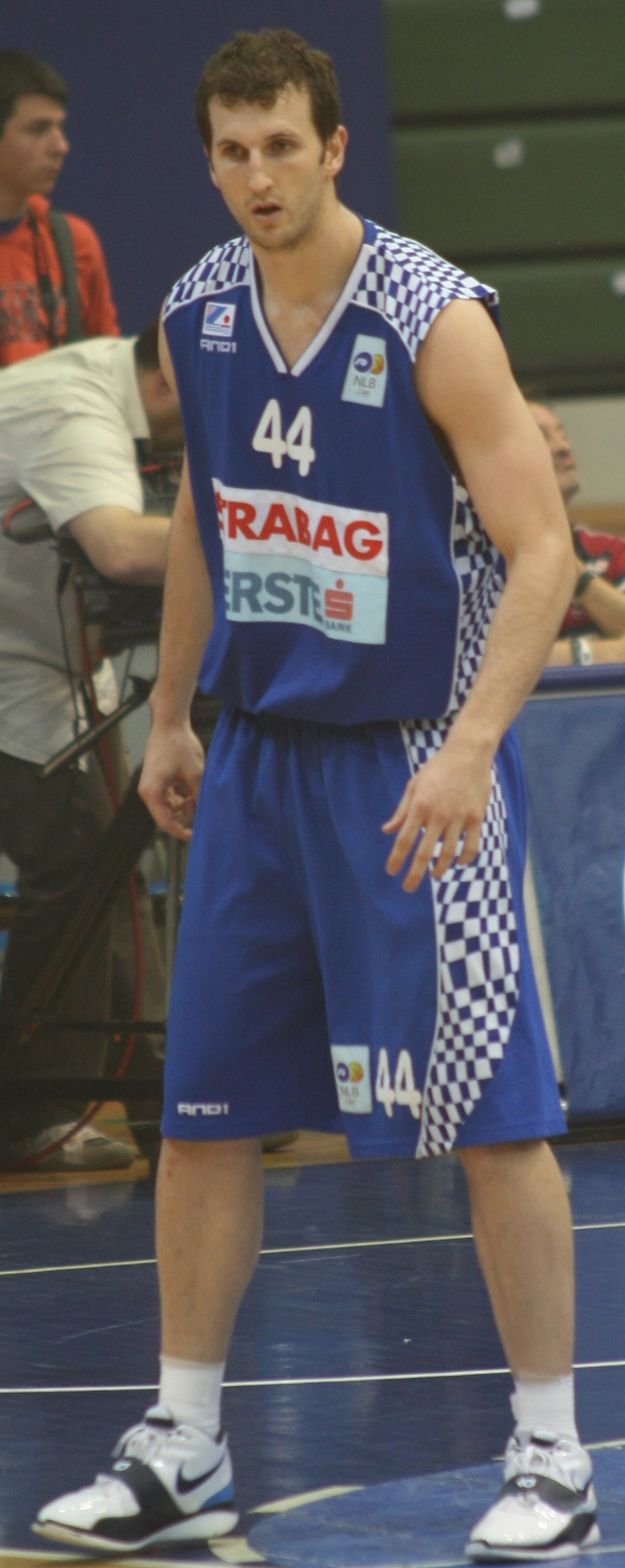
- Plaisted with KK Zadar

Personal information
- Born: October 1, 1986 (age 40) Manteca, California
- Listed height: 6 ft 11 in (2.11 m)
- Listed weight: 245 lb (111 kg)

Career information
- High school: Tom C. Clark (San Antonio, Texas)
- College: BYU (2004–2008)
- NBA draft: 2008: 2nd round, 46th overall pick
- Drafted by: Seattle SuperSonics
- Playing career: 2008–2017
- Position: Power forward / center

Career history
- 2008–2009: Angelico Biella
- 2009–2010: Zadar
- 2010–2011: Cedevita
- 2011: Žalgiris Kaunas
- 2011–2012: Cherkaski Mavpy
- 2012: Aliağa Petkim
- 2012–2013: Limoges CSP
- 2013–2014: ratiopharm Ulm
- 2014–2015: Limoges CSP
- 2015: Club La Unión
- 2016: Neptūnas Klaipėda
- 2016–2017: Phoenix Hagen
- 2017: Alvark Tokyo

Career highlights
- LNB Pro A champion (2015); LKL champion (2011)
- Stats at Basketball Reference

Trent Michael Plaisted (born October 1, 1986) is a retired American professional basketball player.

== Career ==
=== College ===
Plaisted committed to Brigham Young University after earning Texas 5A First Team All-State honors at Clark High School in San Antonio, Texas. He played sparingly in five games during the 2004–05 season before receiving a medical redshirt. He made a strong impression in his first full year playing for the Cougars, leading the team in scoring and rebounding, and earning the Mountain West Conference Freshman of the Year award. He was also named national freshman of the week on three occasions by various media outlets. Plaisted had six double-doubles throughout the year, including 22 points and 16 rebounds in a come-from-behind overtime victory at home against TCU. A notoriously bad free throw shooter, Plaisted went 8-8 from the line in that game against TCU, hitting several key free throws late in the game to secure the win. Later that year, this time playing on the road against TCU, he totaled 17 points and 18 rebounds - the most rebounds by a BYU player in a single game since 1991.

Plaisted's statistics declined somewhat during his sophomore year as teammate Keena Young emerged as BYU's go-to guy, ultimately winning the conference player of the year award. Despite this, Plaisted scored a career-high 27 points in a game twice that season, including a standout performance against Wyoming in the MWC tournament in which he shot 10-13 from the floor and added 10 rebounds.

The following year, with Young graduated from the program, Plaisted resumed as BYU's best post player, and responded by averaging 15.6 points and 7.7 rebounds per game. He received national attention early in the year for his play in the Las Vegas Invitational Tournament, posting 21 points and 12 rebounds in an upset victory over #6 Louisville, and then tallying 24 points and 17 rebounds the following night against #1 North Carolina. He finished the year with eight double-doubles, including 18 points and 18 rebounds against Pepperdine, matching his career high for rebounds. BYU finished the season 14–2 in MWC play, clinching their second consecutive conference championship. Plaisted earned numerous awards for his play, including First Team All-MWC, NABC All-District 13, and USBWA All-District VIII.

=== Professional ===
Plaisted entered the NBA draft in 2008, forgoing his senior season at BYU. He was an intriguing prospect, with good size (6'11" and 245 pounds) and terrific athleticism for a big man, including a 41-inch vertical leap and a 4.6-second time in the 40-yard dash. He was drafted 46th overall in by the Seattle SuperSonics, who traded his draft rights, along with the draft rights of Walter Sharpe, to the Detroit Pistons in exchange for the draft rights to D. J. White.

In the summer of 2008, Plaisted signed a one-year contract with the Italian team Angelico Biella. He played in two games in December before suffering a season-ending injury. In August 2009, he signed a one-yer deal with KK Zadar, a club from Croatia. He played for the Philadelphia 76ers in the Orlando Pro Summer League in 2010, and later for the Chicago Bulls in the NBA Summer League. In October 2010, he signed a one-year deal with Cedevita Zagreb.

On February 3, 2011, he signed with Žalgiris Kaunas until the end of the season. In June 2011, he left Žalgiris Kaunas, after helping Žalgiris win the Lithuanian championship. In November 2011, he moved to Ukraine and signed with Cherkaski Mavpy.

In January 2012, he signed with the Turkish team Aliağa Petkim for the remainder of the season. In December 2012, he moved to France and signed with Limoges CSP for the rest of the season.

In July 2013, Plaisted signed a one-year contract with the German club Ratiopharm Ulm. In September 2014, he signed a one-year deal with Limoges CSP, returning for a second stint.

On December 30, 2015, Plaisted signed with Neptūnas Klaipėda for the rest of the 2015–16 season. He helped Neptūnas reach the Lithuanian championship finals, where Neptūnas was beaten by Plaisted's former team, Žalgiris.

On July 28, 2016, Plaisted signed with German club Phoenix Hagen. On February 16, 2017, he moved to Alvark Tokyo of the Japanese B.League.

In January 2018 he announced he is retiring from professional basketball.
