= Ferdinando Gentile =

Italian basketball player & coach (born 1967)

Nando Gentile
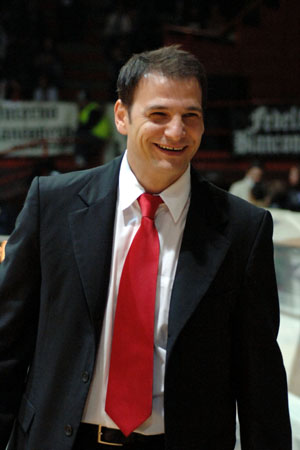
- Ferdinando Gentile in 2006

Personal information
- Born: 1 January 1967 (age 59) Caserta, Campania, Italy
- Listed height: 190 cm (6 ft 3 in)
- Listed weight: 85 kg (187 lb)

Career information
- NBA draft: 1989: undrafted
- Playing career: 1982–2005
- Position: Point guard
- Number: 5, 9
- Coaching career: 2006–present

Career history

Playing
- 1982–1993: Juvecaserta Basket
- 1993–1994: Stefanel Trieste
- 1994–1998: Stefanel Milano
- 1998–2001: Panathinaikos
- 2001–2002: Snaidero Udine
- 2002: Pallacanestro Reggiana
- 2002: Montepaschi Siena
- 2003–2004: JuveCaserta
- 2004–2005: Artus Maddaloni

Coaching
- 2006–2007: Andrea Costa Imola
- 2008–2009: Virtus Roma
- 2011–2012: Veroli Basket

Career highlights
- As player: EuroLeague champion (2000); FIBA European Selection (1991); 3× Greek League champion (1998–2001); 2× Italian League champion (1991, 1996); 2× Italian Cup winner (1988, 1996); No. 5 retired by JuveCaserta

Career LBA statistics
- Points: 7,470
- Assists: 1,068
- Steals: 1,080
Medals
Men's basketball
Representing Italy
FIBA EuroBasket
Silver medal – second place	1991 Italy
European U-18 Championship
Bronze medal – third place	1986 Austria	U-18 Team

Ferdinando Gentile, commonly known as Nando Gentile (born 1 January 1967), is an Italian former professional basketball player and coach. Playing as a point guard, Gentile had a successful pro club playing career, amassing a slew of team trophies won in Italy and Greece, including the EuroLeague title.

He also played with the senior Italian national team, with whom he won a silver medal at the EuroBasket 1991.

== Professional career ==
Gentile, a Caserta native, started his career at only 15, with local side Juvecaserta Basket, playing under head coach Bogdan Tanjević, in 1982. He played in a few games, as the team earned promotion from the Italian second division Serie A2, to the Italian first division LBA, at the end of the season.

Gentile soon became a "big-time player" for Caserta, helping them qualify for the 1983–84 FIBA Korać Cup, which was their first participation in a European-wide competition. Caserta and Gentile reached the final of the 1985–86 FIBA Korać Cup, but lost to Virtus Roma.

In 1988, the team won the Italian Cup, Gentile's first trophy. This allowed Caserta to play in the 1988–89 Saporta Cup, where they reached the final, losing in overtime to Real Madrid.

His defining feat during his Caserta career was his participation in the 1991 Italian League Serie A championship that was won by the Campanians. He scored 28 points in the finals game 5 against Olimpia Milano.

Gentile moved to Stefanel Trieste in 1993, reuniting with head coach Bogdan Tanjević. He reached the 1993–94 FIBA Korać Cup final with the side.

When owner Bepi Stefanel left Trieste, to go to Olimpia Milano in 1994, he also moved the whole squad to Milan, including Gentile and Tanjević. Gentile captained the team, as they won the Italian double (winning the Italian League and Italian Cup) in the 1995–96 season. They also nearly won the small triple crown, but they lost in the Korać Cup final.

He played in two other European-wide finals with Milan, the 1995 Korać Cup, and the 1998 EuroCup, but he lost both, whilst in 1997, he suffered a knee injury, as Milan lost in the EuroLeague quarterfinals.

In 1998, with Milan on the verge of getting dismantled, Gentile signed with Panathinaikos, in Greece. With the Athens side, he would win three consecutive Greek Basket League championships, in as many years. Furthermore, he helped the Greeks win the 1999–2000 FIBA EuroLeague, by beating Maccabi Tel Aviv, in the final. In the next season, he reached the final of the SuproLeague (the renamed official successor to the FIBA EuroLeague), but this time Panathinaikos lost to Maccabi.

Gentile returned to Italy in 2001, briefly playing with Snaidero Udine, before finishing the season with the Italian second division side Pallacanestro Reggiana. Following that, he had a brief stay at Montepaschi Siena in the Serie A, playing with them in 5 games.

He returned to JuveCaserta, which was at that time playing in the Italian third division Serie B, to play the 2003–04 season. After playing with the Italian amateur side, Artus Maddaloni, the next year, he retired in 2005.

== National team career ==
Gentile played with the Italian Under-18 junior national team at the 1986 FIBA Europe Under-18 Championship and with the Italian Under-19 junior national team at the 1987 FIBA Under-19 World Cup.

After having made his debut for the senior men's Italian national basketball team in 1984, he took part in EuroBasket 1987, EuroBasket 1993, and EuroBasket 1995.

With Italy, he was a silver medalist at the EuroBasket 1991. He also played at the 1993 Mediterranean Games, winning gold. An October 1996, qualification game for the EuroBasket 1997, was his last game with the Italian national team.

== Coaching career ==
Gentile next started a coaching career, with the Italian second division club, Andrea Costa Imola, for the 2006–07 season. However, he did not finish the season coaching the club, after he bad results.

He joined Virtus Roma as an assistant coach in 2008. When the team's head coach, Jasmin Repeša, resigned after a few months, Gentile was appointed the team's new head coach, in January 2008. Though he was confirmed as the club's head coach for the 2009–10 season, he resigned in December 2009.

A coaching stint with Veroli, in the 2011–12 season, remains to date, his last coaching experience.

== Personal ==
Nando's two sons, Stefano and Alessandro, are also professional basketball players, and both have also played with Nando's former team, Olimpia Milano. Alessandro was also the captain of Milano, and he also played with Panathinaikos, another of Nando's former teams.

== Honours ==
=== Team ===
==== Italian senior national team ====
- EuroBasket: 1991 Italy Silver
- Mediterranean Games: 1993 Languedoc-Roussillon Gold

==== Club ====
- EuroLeague: Champion (2000).
- 3× Greek Basket League: Champion (1999, 2000, 2001).
- 2× Italian LBA League: Champion (1991, 1996).
- 2× Italian Cup: Winner (1988, 1996).
