= Ojārs Siliņš =

Latvian basketball player (born 1993)

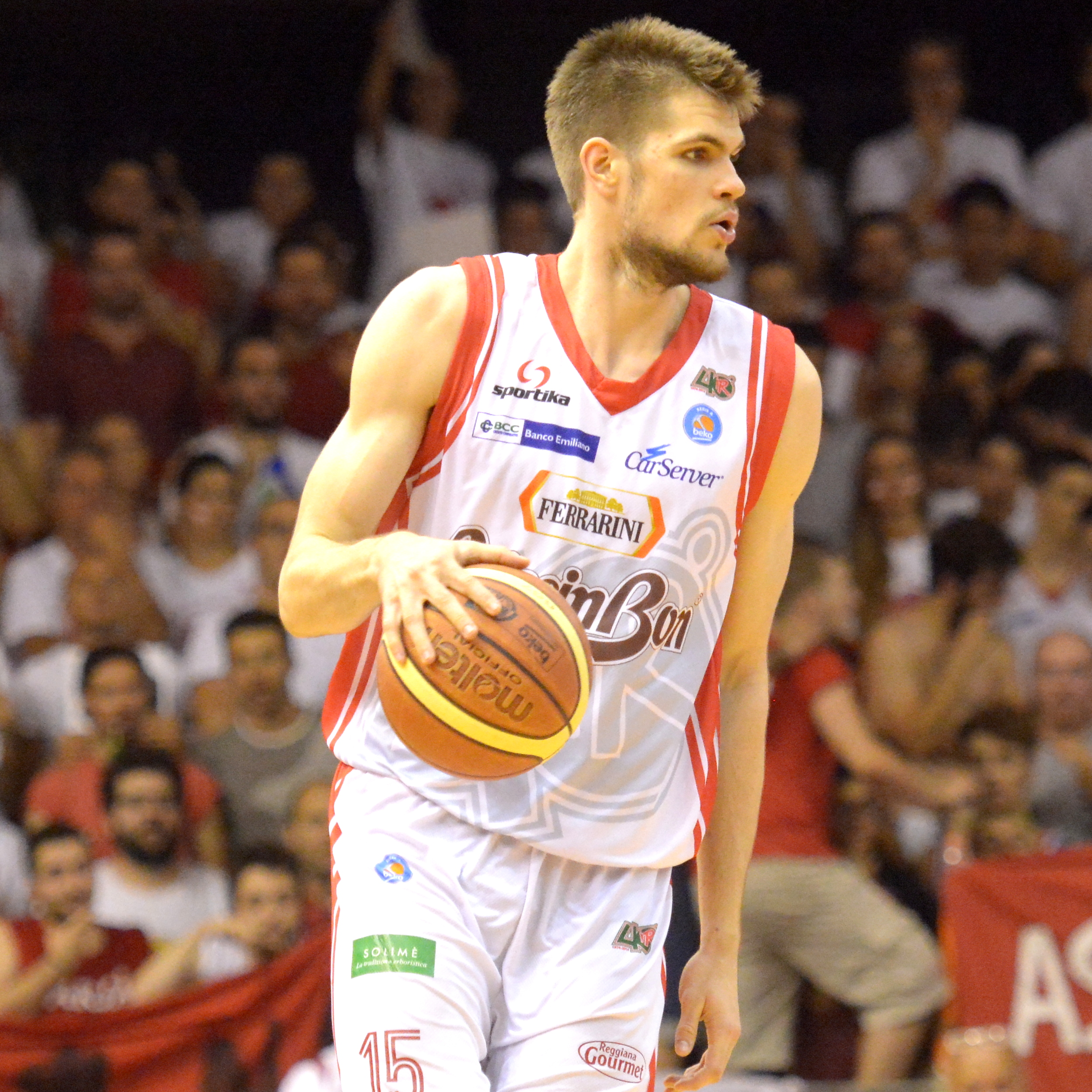
- Siliņš with Grissin Bon Reggio Emilia in 2015

No. 4 – VEF Rīga
- Position: Small forward / power forward
- League: LBL; LEBL

Personal information
- Born: 20 July 1993 (age 33) Riga, Latvia
- Listed height: 204 cm (6 ft 8 in)
- Listed weight: 98 kg (216 lb)

Career information
- NBA draft: 2014: undrafted
- Playing career: 2009–present

Career history
- 2009–2010: BK Keizarmežs
- 2009: →Stella Azzurra Roma
- 2012–2016: Reggiana
- 2016–2017: Bonn
- 2017–2018: Trento
- 2018: Trieste
- 2018–2019: Scandone Avellino
- 2019–2020: Brescia
- 2020: BCM Gravelines
- 2020–2021: BC Astana
- 2021–2022: BC Kalev
- 2022–2024: Stal Ostrów Wielkopolski
- 2024–2026: Legia Warsaw
- 2026–present: VEF Rīga

Career highlights
- 2x PLK champion (2025, 2026); ENBL winner (2023); Polish Supercup winner (2022); EuroChallenge champion (2014); Italian Supercup winner (2015); Kazakhstan League champion (2021)
Medals
Men's basketball
Representing Latvia
FIBA Europe Under-20 Championship
Silver medal – second place	2013 Estonia	National Team

Ojārs Siliņš (born 20 July 1993) is a Latvian professional basketball player who plays for VEF Rīga of the Latvian-Estonian Basketball League and Champions League. He plays the small forward and power forward positions. During his club career abroad Ojars has participated in 11 title games and won 7 of them.

== Professional career ==
Siliņš made his professional debut aged 16 with hometown team BK Ķeizarmežs during the 2009–10 season, playing in both the Latvian Basketball League and the Baltic Basketball League (6.8 points and 2.2 rebounds per game in the latter). Transferring midseason to youth side Stella Azzurra Roma, he participated in the Euroleague Next Generation Tournament with the team, finishing as top scorer of the Rome leg with 20.5 points per game, in addition to 5.3 rebounds.

Siliņš had a trial with Italian professional side Trenkwalder Reggio Emilia, later signing a multi-year contract. His first team debut was in December 2011 in a Cup game, scoring 13 points. During his first complete season as a pro, Siliņš averaged 2.0 points and 1.6 rebounds in 11.2 minutes per game.

On 25 April, Siliņš top-scored for Reggio Emilia with 14 points to help then get past Royal Halı Gaziantep in the EuroChallenge semi-final, as the side went on to win the competition. He started all but one game during the domestic season, posting 7.1 points, 2.6 rebounds and 0.9 blocks in nearly 24 minutes per game. His averages increased to 9 points and 1.2 blocks during the playoff quarterfinals series against Montepaschi Siena. Siliņš was named the second best young player in Serie A.

Siliņš was an early entry for the 2014 NBA draft, with a good performance at the adidas Eurocamp enhancing his stock, though he would go undrafted. He signed a two-year contract extension with Reggio Emilia in the summer. After being hampered by injuries during the first part of the 2014–15 season, he profited from being repositioned at his natural small forward position, performing well in the title playoffs as the team reached the finals. In September 2015, Siliņš won the Italian Supercoppa for the first time in club's history. In June, 2016, Siliņš and Reggio Emilia repeated their way back to Italian League finals, but, once again, lost. Later that month, OJ announced his intention to leave Reggio Emilia after six years spent there.

At the beginning of October 2016 Ojars signed a one-month deal with Bundesliga team Telekom Baskets Bonn and after an excellent performances during the month signed an extension for a season despite offers from other teams. In July 2017 OJ was the first summer acquisition of Aquila Basket Trento, signing a one-year-contract with the team and returning to ULEB Eurocup. Silins had his best season thus far, establishing himself as an elite shooter during season 2017/2018 and as a starter helped his underdog team to go to Italian finals.

On October 15, 2018 Ojars signed a deal with the Italian basketball club Pallacanestro Trieste. Despite good performances and growing role OJ decided to opt-out after two months. In January he signed with Sidigas Avellino.

On December 4, 2019, he signed with Brescia Leonessa of the Italian Lega Basket Serie A (LBA) a two-month contract with an option to extend it until the end of the season as replacement for the injured Ken Horton.

On January 30, 2020, he has signed with Gravelines-Dunkerque of the French LNB Pro A. For the 2020–2021 season, Silins signed with BC Astana. There he made his VTB United League debut and stood out with a couple of stellar performances against then Euroleague team BC Khimki. At the end of the season he helped Astana to win Kazakhstan League title and was named the best foreigner in league finals.

On July 6, 2021 Silins signed a contract with BC Kalev. Under coach Roberts Štelmahers he transitioned back to the small forward position.

On September 5, 2022, he has signed with Stal Ostrów Wielkopolski of the Polish Basketball League (PLK). After a great regular season, in which Silins helped his team to win Polish Supercup and ENBL trophy, he extended the contract with the team for one more season.

After two great seasons with BM Stal, on July 9 2024, Silins signed on to play for another ambitious Polish team Legia Warsaw. Ojars helped Legia win its first Polish championship in 56 years and extended his contract for another year.

On July 20, 2026, after 16 years abroad, Silins signed a two-year contract with Latvian powerhouse VEF Rīga.

== International career ==
Siliņš has played for the Latvian under-age sides at the Under-16, U-18, U-20 European Championships and the 2011 FIBA Under-19 World Championship. With the Under-20's, he would earn a silver medal at the 2013 U-20 European Championship played in Tallinn, averaging 12 points, 8.9 rebounds and 2.1 blocks in about 38 minutes per game.

He was invited to the senior national team for EuroBasket 2013 subsequently but was unable to answer the call-up due to an injury; again due to an injury he was forced to miss EuroBasket 2015.

In 2016, Silins finally made a debut in Senior National Team and took a part in 2016 FIBA World Olympic Qualifying Tournaments for Men, averaging 7.7 points, 4.3 rebounds, 1.3 steals and 1.0 blockshots per game.

In 2017, once again Silins was forced to miss EuroBasket 2017 because of an injury acquired during the preparation process.

From 2017 he's been a regular for Latvian NT in World Cup qualifiers.

== Player profile ==
Siliņš is 2.04 m (6 ft 8 1/2 in) tall with shoes, with a 2.15 m (7 ft 1/2 in) wingspan. He's an athletic combo forward with a good physique, in addition to a decent three point shot, ability to drive-and-kick and post-up smaller opponents. Capable of guarding multiple positions, he runs the floor well, rebounds on both ends and can compete with stronger opponents in the post.

== Personal ==
Ojars is the son of a late Latvian movie and theater actor and sports enthusiast Aivars Siliņš. Mother Anita works in a theater. Also, his older sister Mara is a former actress but older brother Andrejs is a basketball writer. Ojars has also an older half-sister Elīna who's a former politician.

== Honors and awards ==
=== Club career ===
- (Italy) Grissin Bon Reggio Emilia (2012–2016)
  - FIBA EuroChallenge Championship: (2014)
  - Lega Basket A Runner Up: (2015, 2016)
  - Supercoppa: (2015)
- (Italy) Dolomiti Energia Trento (2017–2018)
  - Lega Basket A Runner Up: (2018)
- BC Astana (2020–2021)
  - Kazakhstan Basketball Championship: (2021)
- (Poland) Stal Ostrów Wielkopolski (2022–2024)
  - Polish Basketball Supercup: (2022)
  - European North Basketball League: (2023)
  - Polish Basketball League Bronze: (2023)
  - Polish Cup Runner Up: (2024)
- (Poland) Legia Warsaw (2024–present)
  - 2x PLK champion (2025, 2026)

=== Individual ===
- Best scorer of Euroleague Next Generation Tournament: (2009)
- Lega Basket Serie A Defensive Player of the Year: (2014)

=== National team ===
- FIBA Europe U-20 Championship Runner Up: (2013)
