= 2023 Italian Basketball Supercup =

2023 Frecciarossa Supercoppa

Tournament details
- Arena: PalaLeonessa; Brescia, Lombardy, Italy
- Dates: 23–24 September 2023

Final positions
- Champions: Virtus Segafredo Bologna (4th title)
- Runners-up: Germani Brescia

Awards and statistics
- MVP: (Georgia (country)) Tornike Shengelia

The 2023 Italian Basketball Supercup (Italian: Supercoppa di pallacanestro 2023), also known as Frecciarossa Supercoppa 2023 for sponsorship reasons, is the 29th edition of the super cup tournament, organized by the Lega Basket Serie A (LBA). The title was won by Virtus Segafredo Bologna, which defeated 97–60 Germani Brescia, winning the title three times in a row.

== Participant teams ==
Team	Home city	Head coach
EA7 Emporio Armani Milano	Milan	(Italy) Ettore Messina
Bertram Derthona Tortona	Tortona	(Italy) Marco Ramondino
Germani Brescia	Sassari	(Italy) Andrea Magro
Virtus Segafredo Bologna	Bologna	(Italy) Luca Banchi

== Final Four ==
Semifinals; 23 September
1	EA7 Emporio Armani Milano	73
4	Virtus Segafredo Bologna	78
2	Germani Brescia	86
3	Bertram Derthona Tortona	63

Final; 24 September
1	Virtus Segafredo Bologna	97
2	Germani Brescia	60

== Semifinals ==
=== EA7 Emporio Armani Milano vs. Virtus Segafredo Bologna ===
23 September 2023	EA7 Emporio Armani Milano	73–78	Virtus Segafredo Bologna	Brescia
18:00 (CEST)	Scoring by quarter: 12–14, 20–20, 21–25, 20–19
Discovery+, DAZN	Pts: Shields 26; Rebs: Mirotić; Asts: Melli 3 PIR: Shields 23	Boxscore	Pts: Belinelli 15; Rebs: Shengelia 5 Asts: Pajola 4 PIR: Shengelia 18	Arena: PalaLeonessa; Referees: Giovannetti, Grigioni, Valzani

=== Germani Brescia vs. Bertram Derthona Tortona ===
23 September 2023	Germani Brescia	86–63	Bertram Derthona Tortona	Brescia
20:45 (CEST)	Scoring by quarter: 23–8, 22–19, 20–18, 21–18
Discovery+, DAZN	Pts: Della Valle 20; Rebs: Bilan 9 Asts: Massinburg 5 PIR: Massinburg 24	Boxscore	Pts: Obasohan 16; Rebs: Baldasso 7 Asts: Zerini 3 PIR: Baldasso 19	Arena: PalaLeonessa; Referees: Lanzarini, Bongiorni, Gonella

== Final ==
=== Virtus Segafredo Bologna vs. Germani Brescia ===
29 September 2022	Virtus Segafredo Bologna	97–60	Germani Brescia	Brescia
18:00 (CEST)	Scoring by quarter: 27–10, 21–25, 28–8, 2117
Discovery+, DAZN, Nove	Pts: Cordinier 17; Rebs: Shengelia 12; Asts: Belinelli 4 PIR: Shengelia 36	Boxscore	Pts: Bilan 14; Rebs: Bilan 6 Asts: Della Valle 3 PIR: Bilan 22	Arena: PalaLeonessa; Referees: Lanzarini, Giovannetti, Grigioni

2023 Italian Supercup champions
Virtus Segafredo Bologna
4th title
