= Stefano Gentile =

Italian basketball player (born 1989)

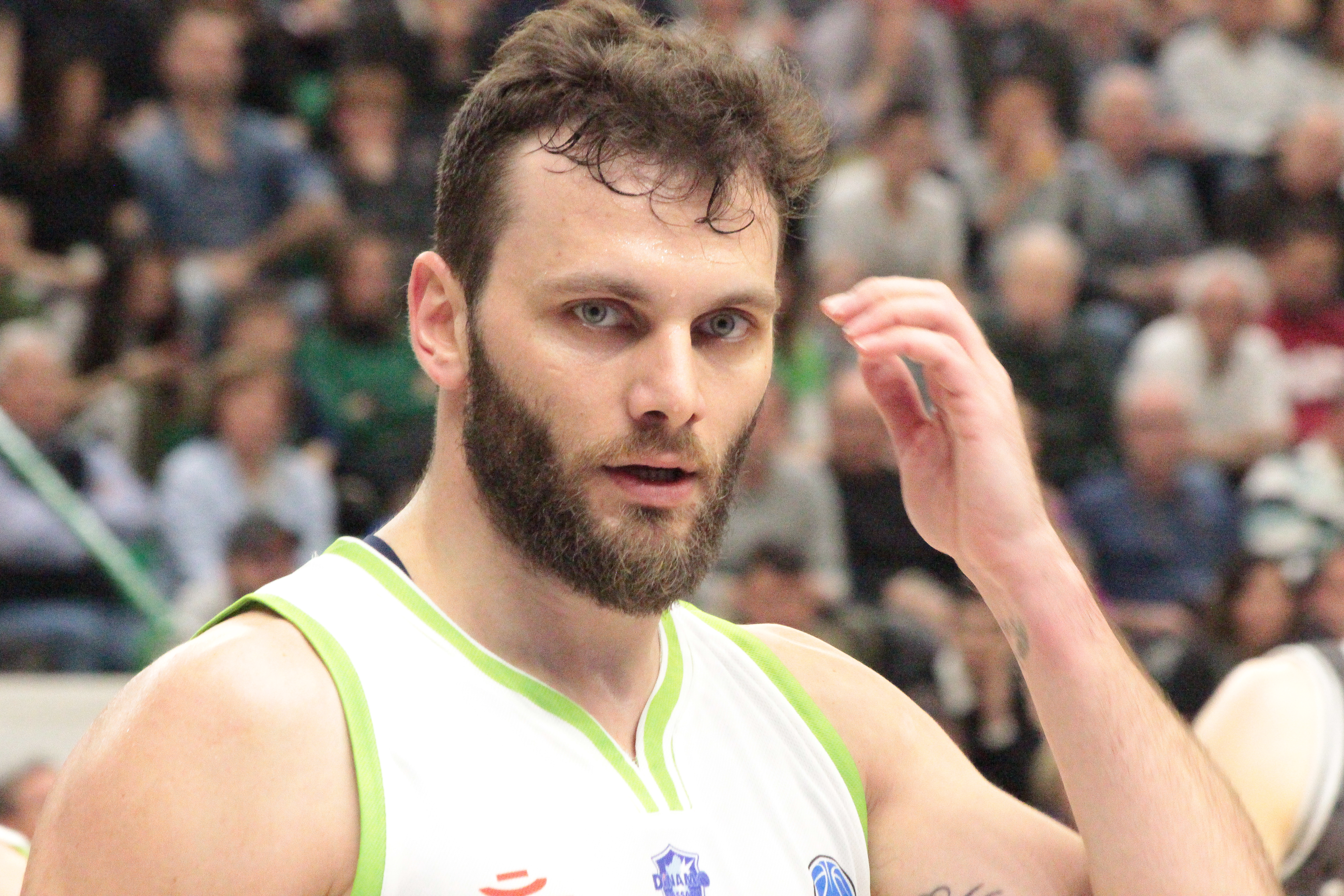
- Gentile with Sassari in 2019

No. 22 – Scafati Basket
- Position: Point guard / shooting guard
- League: LBA

Personal information
- Born: 20 September 1989 (age 37) Maddaloni, Italy
- Listed height: 1.91 m (6 ft 3 in)
- Listed weight: 94 kg (207 lb)

Career information
- NBA draft: 2011: undrafted
- Playing career: 2005–present

Career history
- 2005–2006: Juvecaserta
- 2006–2007: Andrea Costa Imola
- 2007–2008: Olimpia Milano
- 2008–2009: Ostuni
- 2009–2010: Trento
- 2010–2012: Junior Casale
- 2012–2013: Juvecaserta
- 2013–2015: Cantù
- 2015–2017: Reggiana
- 2017–2018: Virtus Bologna
- 2018–2024: Dinamo Sassari
- 2024–2025: Trapani Shark
- 2025–2026: Napoli Basket
- 2026–present: Scafati Basket

Career highlights
- FIBA Europe Cup champion (2019); Italian Supercup winner (2015); 2× Italian All-Star (2013, 2014); 2× Italian All-Star Game MVP (2013, 2014); 2× Italian 2nd Division champion (2011, 2017)

Stefano Gentile (born 20 September 1989) is an Italian professional basketball player for Scafati Basket of the Italian Lega Basket Serie A (LBA). At a height of 1.91 m (6 ft 3 in) tall, he plays at the point guard position.

== Professional career ==
Gentile started his club career at his father Nando's last team, Juvecaserta Basket, in the LegaDue (Italian 2nd Division). He then went to Andrea Costa Imola, of the same division, where his father was the head coach. With Andrea Costa Imola, he caught the eye of Serie A (Italian first division) side Armani Jeans Milano, a club in which his father had previously been a star player.

With Milano, he played in the Italian first division, and also the European-wide top-tier level EuroLeague. However, he struggled to get any meaningful playing time, and he then dropped down to the Italian fourth division level, first with Assi Ostuni, and then with Aquila Basket Trento. After a good season with Aquila Basket Trento, in which the club gained a league promotion to the LegaDue (Italian 2nd Division), he reentered the Italian top division, with Junior Casale, before later joining his former team, Juvecaserta Basket, also in the Italian first division.

With Caserta, he flourished under head coach Stefano Sacripanti, and earned a selection to the 2012–13 Italian All-Star Game, where he played alongside his brother, Alessandro, and he was awarded MVP. When the club's head coach Sacripanti, moved to the ambitious club Pallacanestro Cantù, he quickly recruited Gentile to join him. With Cantù, Gentile contributed to the team's good season, as they finished in 3rd place in the 2013–14 Italian League season, and reached the last 32 stage of Europe's second-tier level competition, the EuroCup.

In July 2015, he joined Pallacanestro Reggiana, signing a two-year contract with the club. In April 2017, he became a player of Virtus Pallacanestro Bologna.

On March 31, 2024, he signed with Trapani Shark of the Serie A2.

On June 28, 2025, he signed with Napoli Basket of the Italian Lega Basket Serie A (LBA).

== National team career ==
After playing with the national youth age categories Italy, Gentile dropped off the Italian national team's radar until 2012, when he made his debut with the senior men's Italian national basketball team. In 2014, he played at the FIBA EuroBasket 2015 qualification tournament, in which Italy qualified for the main EuroBasket 2015 tournament.

== Personal life ==
Gentile is the son of the Italian basketball icon Nando Gentile. Stefano moved around Italy and Europe, following his father during his playing career. Along with his younger brother Alessandro, he played with the youth teams of Panathinaikos in Greece, while his father played with the club's senior team. His younger brother is Italian basketball player Alessandro Gentile. He has played with his brother in the senior Italian national team and Virtus Bologna.
