= Massimiliano Menetti =

Italian basketball coach

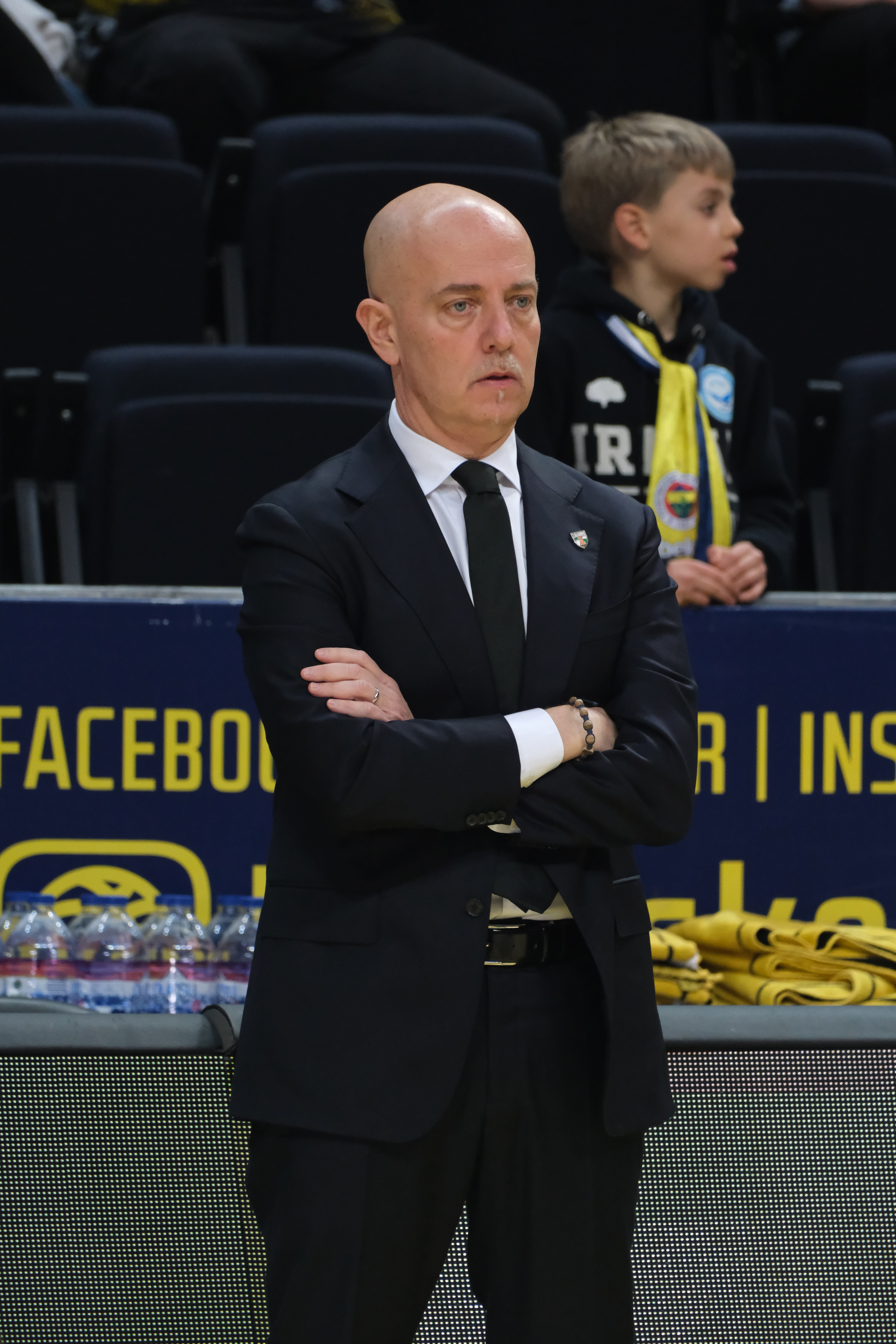

PAOK Thessaloniki
- Position: Lead assistant coach
- League: Greek Basketball League (GBL)

Personal information
- Born: 27 January 1973 (age 53) Palmanova, Friuli, Italy
- Coaching career: 1997–present

Career history

Coaching
- 1997–1998: Reggiana (assistant)
- 1998–2003: Juvenilia Reggio Emilia (women)
- 2003–2006: Reggiana (assistant)
- 2006–2007: Reggiana
- 2007–2008: Reggiana (assistant)
- 2009–2010: Sutor Montegranaro (assistant)
- 2010–2011: Reggiana (assistant)
- 2011–2018: Reggiana
- 2018–2022: Treviso
- 2022: Reggiana
- 2023–2024: Hapoel Eilat
- 2024–2025: Žalgiris Kaunas (assistant)
- 2026–present: PAOK Thessaloniki (assistant)

Career highlights
- FIBA EuroChallenge champion (2014); Italian Supercup winner (2015); 2× Italian 2nd League champion (2012, 2019); LegaDue Coach of the Year (2012); 2× King Mindaugas Cup winner (2024, 2025); Lithuanian Basketball League champion (2025)

Massimiliano "Max" Menetti (born 27 January 1973) is an Italian professional basketball coach who is the lead assistant coach for PAOK Thessaloniki of the Greek Basketball League (GBL) and the EuroCup.

== Career ==
After spending years coaching the youth teams of Pallacanestro Reggiana and serving as assistant coach, Menetti was offered the head coach role for the 2006–07 season, though he returned to the assistant role at the end of the season.

After a stint at Sutor Montegranaro in 2009–10, again as an assistant, he returned to Reggio Emilia. One year later, he was named head coach again, a position he held for the subsequent seasons. In 2014, he led Pallacanestro Reggiana to the EuroChallenge title.

On 1 July 2015, his contract was extended until 2017.

On 16 May 2018, Menetti and Pallacanestro Reggiana consensually parted ways, with one year of his contract still remaining. Menetti left the club after eight seasons as head coach since taking over in 2011, having won promotion to Serie A in 2012, reached five consecutive league playoffs and Final Eights between 2012 and 2017, won the EuroChallenge in 2014 and the Italian Supercup in 2015, finished as Serie A runner-up twice in 2015 and 2016, and reached the EuroCup semifinals in 2018.

From the summer of 2018 to 2022, Menetti served as the head coach of Universo Treviso Basket. During his first season at the helm, Treviso won the Serie A2 Basket playoffs and earned promotion to Serie A.

On 28 July 2023, he signed with Hapoel Eilat of the Israeli Basketball Premier League.

On 22 January 2024, Menetti joined Žalgiris Kaunas of the Lithuanian Basketball League (LKL) and the EuroLeague as an assistant coach on the staff of Andrea Trinchieri. During his time with Žalgiris, Menetti won two King Mindaugas Cup titles, in 2024 and 2025, and the Lithuanian Basketball League championship in 2025.

On 10 August 2026, PAOK Thessaloniki announced that Menetti had joined the club's coaching staff as the lead assistant to head coach Andrea Trinchieri. The club stated that Menetti had already been working with PAOK for approximately three months prior to the official announcement, having begun his day-to-day involvement with the team at approximately the same time as Trinchieri. The pair had previously worked together at Žalgiris Kaunas.

== Personal life ==
Menetti is married to former Argentine volleyball player Maria Pia Romanò, with whom he has a daughter. Romanò played for several seasons in Reggio Emilia while Menetti was an assistant coach with Pallacanestro Reggiana.
