= 2015 Italian Basketball Supercup =

Tournament details
- Arena: PalaRuffini; Turin
- Dates: 26 September 2015– 27 September 2015

Final positions
- Champions: Grissin Bon Reggio Emilia
- Runners-up: EA7 Emporio Milano

Awards and statistics
- MVP: (Italy) Amedeo Della Valle

The 2015 Italian Basketball Supercup was the 21st edition of the super cup tournament in Italian basketball league. Qualified for the tournament were league winners and cup winners Dinamo Sassari, cup finalists Olimpia Milano and league finalist Grissin Bon Reggio Emilia and Reyer Venezia Mestre.

== Bracket ==
Semifinals; 26 September
Banco di Sardegna Sassari	78
Grissin Bon Reggio Emilia	79
EA7 Emporio Armani Milano	71
Umana Reyer Venezia	66

Final; 27 September
Grissin Bon Reggio Emilia	80
EA7 Emporio Armani Milano	67

== Semifinals ==
=== Banco di Sardegna Sassari vs. Grissin Bon Reggio Emilia ===
26 September 2015	Banco di Sardegna Sassari	78–79	Grissin Bon Reggio Emilia	Turin
18:15 (CEST)	Scoring by quarter: 21–28, 16–13, 27–22, 14–16
Sky Sport	Pts: Eyenga 16; Rebs: Eyenga 7 Asts: Haynes 3 PIR: Eyenga 16	Boxscore	Pts: Gentile 15; Rebs: Polonara 9 Asts: Gentile 3 PIR: Polonara 16	Arena: PalaRuffini; Referees: Begnis, Biggi, Sardella

=== EA7 Emporio Armani Milano vs. Umana Reyer Venezia ===
26 September 2015	EA7 Emporio Armani Milano	71–66	Umana Reyer Venezia	Turin
20:45 (CEST)	Scoring by quarter: 16–21, 12–16, 22–16, 21–13
Sky Sport	Pts: Gentile 17; Rebs: McLean 8 Asts: Gentile 6 PIR: Gentile 22	Boxscore	Pts: Goss 15; Rebs: three players 4 Asts: Green 7 PIR: Goss 11	Arena: PalaRuffini; Referees: Aronne, Di Francesco, Sabetta

== Final ==
=== Grissin Bon Reggio Emilia vs. EA7 Emporio Armani Milano ===
27 September 2015	Grissin Bon Reggio Emilia	80–68	EA7 Emporio Armani Milano	Turin
18:30 (CET)	Scoring by quarter: 22–19, 17–17, 22–14, 19–18
Sky Sport	Pts: Gentile 14; Rebs: four players 4 Asts: Lavrinovič, Aradori 4 PIR: Gentile, Della Valle 18	Boxscore	Pts: Robbie Hummel 13; Rebs: Mačvan 11; Asts: Cinciarini, Gentile 6 PIR: McLean, Mačvan 10	Arena: PalaRuffini; Referees: Guido Federico Di Francesco, Emanuele Aronne, Enrico Sabetta

Starters:			Pts	Reb	Ast
SF	4	(Italy) Pietro Aradori	10	3	4
PF	6	(Italy) Achille Polonara	9	4	2
C	7	(Lithuania) Darjuš Lavrinovič	4	2	4
SG	13	(Lithuania) Rimantas Kaukėnas	12	1	1
PG	18	(Italy) Stefano Gentile	14	0	0
Reserves:					
PG	8	(Italy) Amedeo Della Valle	13	4	0
C	9	(Italy) Andrea De Nicolao	3	0	0
PF	10	(Latvia) Adam Pecháček	0	1	1
PF	12	(Belarus) Vladimir Veremeenko	7	4	0
SF	15	(Latvia) Ojārs Siliņš	8	4	1
Head coach:
(Italy) Massimiliano Menetti

Grissin Bon Reggio Emilia	EA7 Emporio Armani Milano

Italian Supercoppa MVP
(Italy) Amedeo Della Valle
Game rules
Game was played under FIBA rules.

2015 Italian Supercup Winners
Grissin Bon Reggio Emilia
1st title

Starters:			Pts	Reb	Ast
PF	1	(United States) Jamel McLean	9	4	1
SG	5	(Italy) Alessandro Gentile	9	5	6
C	13	(Serbia) Milan Mačvan	6	11	0
SG	22	(Serbia) Charles Jenkins	6	0	0
PG	20	(Italy) Andrea Cinciarini	8	2	6
Reserves:					
PG	3	(Croatia) Oliver Lafayette	0	3	2
PG	6	(Italy) Andrea Amato	DNP		
SF	7	(Italy) Bruno Cerella	0	2	1
SF	24	(United States) Robbie Hummel	13	0	1
C	15	(Italy) Daniele Magro	DNP		
C	31	(Nigeria) Gani Lawal	6	0	0
SF	43	(Croatia) Krunoslav Simon	11	0	1
Head coach:
(Croatia) Jasmin Repeša
