= Pallacanestro Reggiana =

Coordinates: 44°41′56″N 10°37′29″E

- Leagues: LBA; Champions League
- Founded: 1974; 52 years ago
- History: Pallacanestro Reggiana; 1974–present
- Arena: PalaBigi
- Capacity: 4,530
- Location: Reggio Emilia, Emilia-Romagna, Italy
- Team colors: White, red
- President: Veronica Bartoli
- Team manager: Marco Sambugaro (GM)
- Head coach: Dimitrios Priftis
- Ownership: Bartoli family (Antichi Poderi di Canossa), Enrico San Pietro (ESP SRL), Graziano Sassi (GS Brands)
- Championships: 1 EuroChallenge; 2 LegaDue; 1 Italian Supercup
- Website: pallacanestroreggiana.it
Home	Away

Pallacanestro Reggiana, simply known as Reggiana or Reggio Emilia, currently known for sponsorship reasons as Unahotels Reggio Emilia, is an Italian professional basketball team based in Reggio Emilia, Emilia-Romagna. It currently plays in the LBA.

== History ==
=== 1970s ===
Pallacanestro Reggiana was founded on 3 September 1974 by eight friends who wanted to establish a club that would unite the basketball community of Reggio Emilia. They started to play in the regional Promozione in a white and blue jersey sponsored by Magazzini Jolly, with the season ending with a promotion to the Serie D, in which they stayed a couple of seasons before again moving up, to the Serie C. The 1977–78 preseason saw the club merge with Cestistica Tricolore and come under the ownership of Cantine Riunite who also started sponsoring the club and changed its colours to white and red in the process. During the season itself, a team composed mainly by young local players led by Gianni Codeluppi earned a promotion to the third division Serie B.

The summer again saw an organisational change as the club amalgamanated Pallacanestro Correggio, which led to the arrival of future great Orazio Rustichelli in the squad. On the court, the team struggled, finishing the season at the last place which would have seen it relegated if not for an off-the-court reprieve. Over the next seasons the team established itself in the Serie B without managing to reach the next level, debuting promising youngster Piero Montecchi in the process.

=== 1980s ===
Players such as Rustichelli (now captain), Montecchi, Fuss and Zonta helped Pallacanestro Reggiana reach the professional ranks with a win in a promotion play-off played in Udine over Necchi Pavia that opened the gates of the second division Serie A2 at the end of the 1981–82 with thousands of young supporters invading the basketball court to celebrate. President Enrico Prandi kept Gianni Zappi as coach and recruited Americans Roosevelt Bouie and Rudy Hackett, father of future Italian national team player Daniel Hackett. These players, along with Pino Brumatti among others under new coach Gianfranco Lombardi, would help reach the Serie A anew. They would stay three seasons in the league, reaching the title playoffs in 1985–86 but going down the next season, with Montecchi leaving for Olimpia Milano at the end of the season.

Coach Piero Pasini ensured Reggio Emilia only stayed one year away and the team stayed in the Serie A over the following seasons which saw club great Joe Bryant arrive (along with his future superstar son Kobe, who played with the youth side).

=== 1990s ===
In 1990 the holding company was brought by Coopsette, with Sidis becoming the team sponsor, the ambitious club reached the Italian Cup Final Four but struggled in the second part of the league season and was relegated. The 1992–93 preseason saw the arrival of a Pallacanestro Reggiana legend in Mike Mitchell, who helped the club return to the elite.

Two seasons later the club was back in the second division, following which it decided to bank on its young academy players such as Alessandro Davoli and Gianluca Basile. Returning to the Serie A in 1997, Reggio Emilia rehired Lombardi as coach, with a young Max Menetti as assistant to guide a team containing players of the caliber of Chris Jent, Diego Pastori, Marcelo Damiao, Gianluca Basile and the evergreen Mike Mitchell. Thereafter came a successful season that saw them reach the title playoffs, downing first Milano (2–0) then in turn Treviso (3–2) winning Game 4 at the buzzer and Game 5 at PalaVerde without Mitchell to reach the semifinals where they exited at the hands of local rivals Teamsystem Bologna. The result was nevertheless enough to send the Italian outfit to a European competition for the first time, in the 1998–99 Korać Cup. Losing Mitchell (now 41) to retirement and Basile to a transfer towards Fortitudo Bologna, they reached the round of 32 in Europe and stalled at the playoff eight finals, losing against Pepsi Rimini.

=== 2000s ===
Two new presidents (Elio Monducci and Chiarino Cimurri) and three different coaches could not prevent the side from falling to the second division at the end of the 1999–00 season with a 7–23 record. A nearly completely re-hauled squad coached by Franco Marcelletti reached the promotion playoffs finishing third the next season, reached the promotion finals after a 3–2 win over Pallacanestro Ragusa, but lost a heartbreaking game five to Livorno on a last second basket (81–79) at home.

Staying in the second division but now playing in the newly created LegaDue, Reggio Emilia also made changes, with Stefano Landi becoming president whilst Cimurri was named head of the LegaDue, a reorganization that also saw Alessandro Dalla Salda, the young former local press officer arising through the ranks, becoming general manager of the first team. Still coach, Marcelletti recruited Alvin Young during the NBA Summer League, with the American turning into an instant success along with compatriot Kris Clack, as the team reached the playoff finals again, after eliminating Ferrara and Scafati, but lost to Napoli, coached by a young Piero Bucchi, after five games, losing again at home (93–82).

A policy change in 2002–03, with Luca Dalmonte brought in as coach and veteran Stefano Rusconi as player, didn't yield better results, on the contrary as the team exited the promotion playoffs in the first round against Sicc Jesi, the first episode of a five years rivalry. Dalmonte lost his place to Fabrizio Frates (with Menetti assisting him), who proceeded to sign Kiwane Garris, Marco Mordente, Angelo Gigli and re-sign Alvin Young and Marcelo Damiao, with side avoiding the playoffs altogether as it finished the regular season in first place to grab the promotion race, sending Carife Ferrara and Jesi to the playoffs.

With a similar squad, the team readapted well to the first division finishing the first round in the second place in order to qualify for the Italian Cup Final Eight, where it made a shocking path to the final beating giants Milano and Roma, but eventually lost the cup 74–64 to Benetton Treviso led by Andrea Bargnani, Marcus Goree and David Blu. An anonymous domestic season in 2005–06 (finishing eleventh) was highlighted by good results in the side's ULEB Cup campaign (eligible to Europe's second competition thanks to their cup final) where they survived the regular season and downed Ventspils in the top 16 to reach the quarterfinals, with Hemofarm Vršac led by Milenko Topić ending their run.

However, the next season ended in tears as Reggio Emilia were again relegated due to worst points difference than Air Avellino; despite Legabasket found irregularities in Treviso's Erazem Lorbek acquisition, the club was not readmitted in the First Division after a Tribunal court process only penalized Treviso record. They languished in the LegaDue in the subsequent years, exiting often in the playoffs.

=== 2010s ===
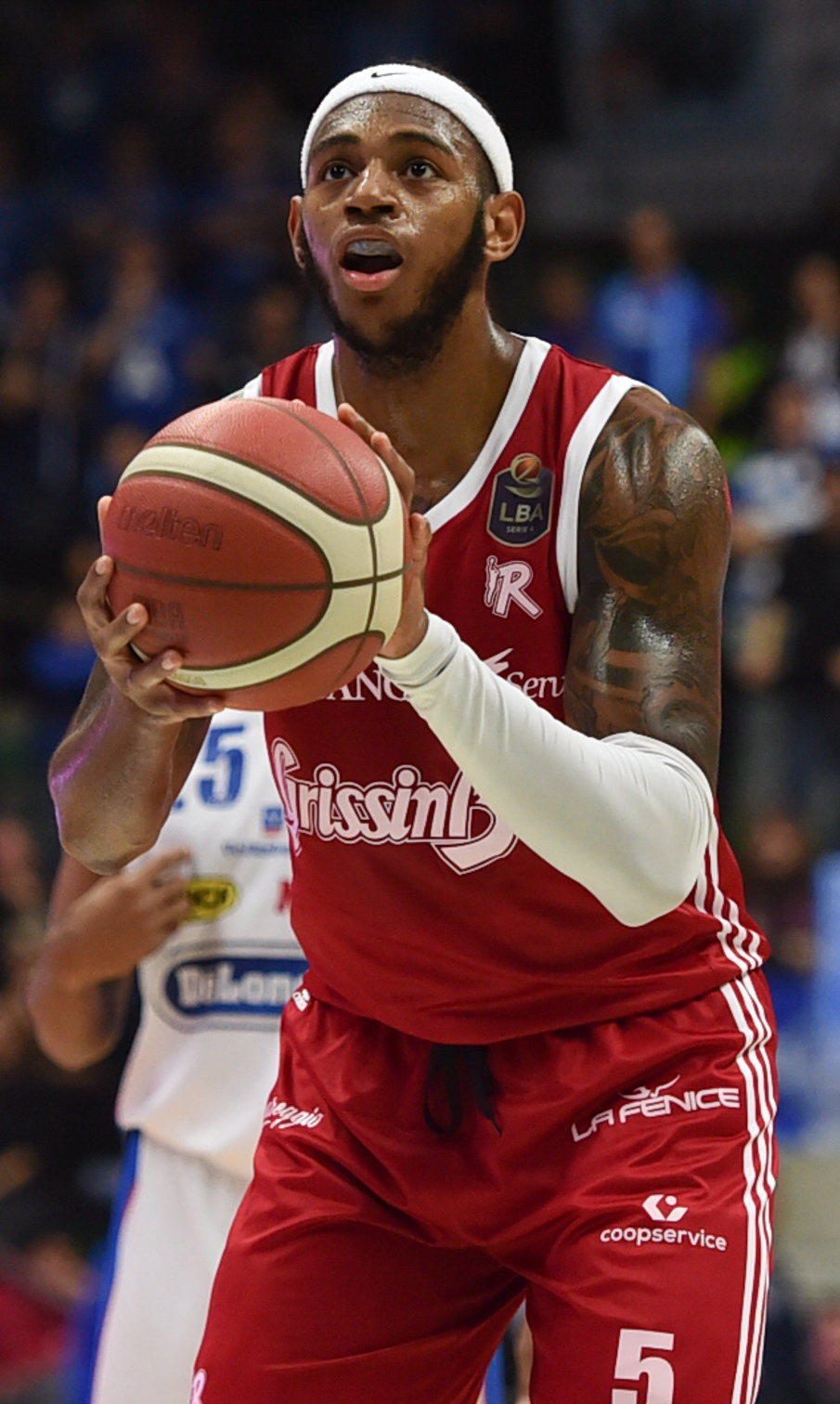
Dererk Pardon

The club flirted with relegation during the 2010–11 season, saving their skin with a last game win over Veroli combined with other results that saw Scafati beating Verona. In a complete turnaround in the 2011–12 season, the team led by Massimiliano Menetti (who had previously become head coach) romped to a promotion that they confirmed with a game to spare against Imola, with a 20–8 record .

The good run of form continued in the Serie A, with Reggio Emilia grabbing a sixth place before taking Luigi Datome's Roma to seven games in their quarterfinals series, losing game 7 in the Eternal City in front of 600 away fans. Qualified for another European competition, the third-tier EuroChallenge, a team spearheaded by EuroChallenge Final Four MVP Andrea Cinciarini - helped by James White among others - recorded an emphatic 79–65 victory over Triumph Lyubertsy in a packed PalaDozza Bologna arena to win their first even international title on 27 April 2014 in front of 4,000 enthusiastic fans.

On the domestic front they again reached the playoffs but were edged 2–3 by holders Montepaschi Siena in their quarterfinal series, after a controversial defeat in a game 4 played at home with Reggio Emilia 2–1 at the time marked by bad refereeing.

The next season saw the stages switched around, with Reggio Emilia jinxed by injuries underperforming in the 2014–15 EuroCup to exit the competition at the group stage with two wins in ten games. However, their league form proved more resilient as they regrouped from a March 68–118 demolition by Milano, finishing third at the end of the regular season. They would make their home advantage count in the quarterfinal series against Enel Brindisi, winning game five at home to go through.

The semifinals against Umana Reyer Venezia had the team with their backs to the wall after a 67–89 defeat in game 5, but they won the next two games to progress to a first ever final. Against Italian Cup and Supercup holders Sassari, the first five games were split between respective home victories with Reggio Emilia favoured. They forced the sixth game in Sassari to three overtimes, with Cinciarini missing two title-winning shots in the dying moments of the fourth quarter, a three from Achille Polonara followed by a steal and layup from Rimantas Kaukėnas put them 5 ahead with seconds left in the first overtime but Sassari came back to force a second overtime, it went back and forth to finish tied and bring another overtime, in which Sassari pulled away for a win.

Despite playing game 7 at home and racing into a 21–4 lead early on, Reggio Emilia could not find a response as Sassari gradually clawed back the lead before using a 12–0 fourth-quarter run to first tie then win a closely contested 73–75 game, denying the local fans the capture of a historic Serie A title.

The next season Reggio Emilia won its first Italian Supercup in Turin, beating rivals Sassari in the semifinals and Milano led by former captain Andrea Cinciarini in the final 80–68. The team managed also to reach the EuroCup Last 32, finishing third in its group with memorable victories over ALBA Berlin, MHP Riesen Ludwigsburg and Le Mans Sarthe Basket; with an 11–4 record Grissin Bon finished the first round at the top of the table for the first time in its history.

With the adds of Vladimir Golubović (January) and Derek Needham (May), the team finished the Regular Season ranked 2nd for the first time in its history, determining a rematch of the previous season Finals with 7th place Dinamo Sassari with the likes of David Logan, Josh Akognon and former NBA prospect Joe Alexander. After easily winning the first two home games led by Pietro Aradori and Amedeo Della Valle, Reggio completed the sweep by winning Game 3 in Sardinia, reaching the semifinals for the second consecutive season to meet with 3rd placed Scandone Avellino.

During the season, the Under–20 youth team had an unbeaten run at the Under–20 National Championship Finals, only to lose the Championship game 70–64 against underdogs Pallacanestro Ferrara. In the playoff semifinals, Grissin Bon won the first two home games, but Avellino came back winning Game 3 and Game 4 with a 43 points margin, tying the series 2–2. After Reggio won Game 5 and Avellino Game 6, Grissin Bon won the decisive Game 7 in front of a sold out PalaBigi 85–80, reaching the second Playoffs final of its history.

The series was marked by a disrespectful behaviour by both sets of fans: in Avellino Amedeo Della Valle and Achille Polonara were attacked with eggs by local fans, while in Game 5 Reggio's crowd repeatedly threw hygienic paper and match programmes into the court. Menetti's side lost Game 1 and Game 2 in Milan against Olimpia Milano, but managed to tie the series 2–2 by winning Game 3 and Game 4 at home. Milano eventually won Game 5 and Game 6 to win the title on Reggio's home court, where former captain Cinciarini was heavily booed.

The 2016–17 season started with the retirement of Kaukenas and the departures of Lavrinovič, Siliņš and Veremeenko. Delroy James and Sava Lešić were the first signings in the summer, while center Riccardo Cervi decided to return to the club after a season away with Avellino. Grissin Bon participated as title holders in the Italian Supercup Final Four, in Milan, but they were eliminated 74–72 in the semifinal by Avellino with a 3-point winning buzzer beater by Joe Ragland.

The campaign in the league started well, with a winning streak of 7 games from the 2nd to the 7th round, ended by a loss away to Varese in the 8th round, which opened a negative record of 2–6, ended by a home win over Brindisi the 6th of February 2017. However, the team managed to beat league favourites EA7 Milan in Bologna on the Boxing Day. Poor form of James and Lešić brought the management to wave them and acquire American rookie Jalen Reynolds and former 2005 NCAA champion Jawad Williams, while Rimantas Kaukenas decided to come out of retirement. Reggio beat 4th seed Capo d'Orlando in the Quarter Finals of the Italian Cup Final Eight, held in Rimini, but were knocked out in the semis by Milan. The poor form of the team continued with three consecutive losses against Trento, Cantù and Avellino that led the management to take the team to a close training camp in Cesenatico for two consecutive weeks. However the team struggled to find chemistry and, despite the arrival of Julian Wright from Trabzonspor for the playoffs, Grissin Bon were knocked out 3-0 in the first round by Avellino. The 2017 offseason saw captain Pietro Aradori leaving for Virtus Bologna with Achille Polonara and Andrea De Nicolao leaving the club too. The management decided to start a new project called #REstart, planning to rebuild the roster with young Italian players like Federico Mussini, Leonardo Candi and Niccoló De Vico with the add ons of Garrett Nevels, Mike Moser (later waived for physical problems), Siim-Sander Vene (never played a game due to injury, left for Varese in January) and Manuchar Markoishvili. However Grissin Bon had a negative 0-6 start, which had a huge impact in the missed qualification for the Final Eight despite the arrivals of Chris Wright, Pedro Llompart and James White. The club's fortune appeared to be the EuroCup, a competition where Reggio advanced to the Top16 and won its group, advancing for the first time to the quarter finals where they clashed with BC Zenit St. Petersburg

=== In European competitions ===
The club has participated in various European tournaments, winning the FIBA EuroChallenge in 2014.

== Logos ==
Logo used until 2026

Logo used since 2026

== Arena ==
Pallacanestro Reggiana has played its home games in the PalaBigi (capacity: 4,530) since 1980. Built in 1968, it is named after the city's Secretary of Sports, Giulio Bigi, and seated 3,800 until a 2007 redesign. Because it was not originally up to standard for some European-wide competitions, Reggio Emilia has had to play some of its home games in European-wide competitions, at the PalaDozza (capacity: 5,721), in Bologna. Construction was undertaken over the summer of 2015, to modernise the arena, in order for it to be able to host EuroCup games.

New locker rooms and new bath fixtures were built at PalaBigi. Then, in October 2015, Luca Vecchi, Mayor of Reggio Emilia, announced a plan to further modernise PalaBigi, increasing the arena's capacity to 4,600 seats. An option to build a new arena near Stadio Città del Tricolore, is still under consideration. During the 2015 and 2016 Italian League Playoffs, the old structure of the arena couldn't accommodate the large amount of ticket requests from the local fans, leading the club to install viewing screens in the cities' biggest squares, "Piazza Martiri del 7 Luglio", and "Piazza San Prospero".

== Academy ==
Pallacanestro Reggiana has invested in the youth programme in order to develop new young prospects: the team that won promotion to "Serie A2" in 1982 was almost entirely composed of players born in the town and trained in the club academy, such as Gianni Codeluppi, Piero Montecchi and Orazio Rustichelli. From 1989 to 1991 a very young Kobe Bryant played in the Academy teams while his father Joe was playing for Pallacanestro Reggiana.

=== Notable graduates ===
- 1982: Piero Montecchi
- 1987: Roberto Casoli
- 1987: David Londero
- 1990: Luca Usberti
- 1993: Alessandro Davolio
- 1995: Gianluca Basile
- 1997: Marco Carra
- 1987: Filippo Masoni
- 2000: Andrea Ghiacci
- 2002: Federico Pugi
- 2002: Angelo Gigli
- 2004: Nicolò Melli
- 2005: Andrea Ancellotti
- 2008: Jakub Kudláček
- 2008: Luca Campani
- 2009: Riccardo Cervi
- 2009: Francesco Veccia
- 2010: Giovanni Pini
- 2010: Simone Zanotti
- 2010: Kenneth Viglianisi
- 2012: Ojārs Siliņš
- 2013: Federico Mussini
- 2014: Andrea Rovatti
- 2015: Federico Bonacini
- 2016: Artūrs Strautiņš
- 2016: Alessandro Lever
- 2017: Nicolò Dellosto
- 2018: Alessandro Cipolla
- 2018: Mouhamet Diouf
- 2023: Momo Faye

== Players ==
=== Current roster ===
Note: Flags indicate national team eligibility at FIBA-sanctioned events. Players may hold other non-FIBA nationalities not displayed.

UNAHOTELS Reggio Emilia roster
Players
Coaches

Pos.	No.	Nat.	Name	Ht.	Wt.	Age
G	0	(United States)	Barford, Jaylen	1.91 m (6 ft 3 in)	92 kg (203 lb)	30 – 23 January 1996
SG	2	(United States)	Edwards, Rob	1.96 m (6 ft 5 in)	93 kg (205 lb)	29 – 20 January 1997
PF	4	(South Sudan)	Thor, JT	2.06 m (6 ft 9 in)	92 kg (203 lb)	24 – 26 August 2002
G	6	(Italy)	Rossato, Riccardo	1.89 m (6 ft 2 in)	85 kg (187 lb)	30 – 18 September 1996
G/F	7	(Italy)	Woldetensae, Tomas	1.96 m (6 ft 5 in)	89 kg (196 lb)	28 – 30 April 1998
SG	9	(Italy)	Visconti, Riccardo	1.98 m (6 ft 6 in)	84 kg (185 lb)	28 – 8 October 1998
PG	10	(United States)	Caupain, Troy	1.93 m (6 ft 4 in)	95 kg (209 lb)	30 – 29 November 1995
SF	11	(Italy)	Manfredotti, Luca	1.95 m (6 ft 5 in)	88 kg (194 lb)	18 – 10 February 2008
G	16	(Italy)	Uglietti, Lorenzo	1.92 m (6 ft 4 in)	84 kg (185 lb)	32 – 27 June 1994
G	19	(Italy)	Hadzhyiev, Arseniy (Y)	1.88 m (6 ft 2 in)	82 kg (181 lb)	18 – 5 January 2008
PF	20	(Italy)	Severini, Luca	2.04 m (6 ft 8 in)	95 kg (209 lb)	30 – 20 June 1996
G/F	22	(Italy)	Petacchi, Cristian (Y)	1.87 m (6 ft 2 in)	82 kg (181 lb)	17 – 24 January 2009
C	25	(Italy)	Fainke, Elhadji	2.02 m (6 ft 8 in)	94 kg (207 lb)	21 – 12 April 2005
C	26	(Colombia)	Echenique, Jaime	2.08 m (6 ft 10 in)	117 kg (258 lb)	29 – 27 April 1997
C	34	(Nigeria)	Ogbeide, Derek	2.06 m (6 ft 9 in)	113 kg (249 lb)	29 – 28 March 1997
PG	44	(United States)	Smith, Speedy	1.91 m (6 ft 3 in)	82 kg (181 lb)	33 – 28 January 1993

Head coach

- (Greece) Dimitrios Priftis

Assistant coach(es)

- (Italy) Federico Fucà
- (Italy) Giuseppe Di Paolo
- (Italy) Marco Rossetti

Legend

- (C) Team captain
- Injured

- Roster
Updated: November 2, 2026

=== Depth chart ===
Pos.	Starting 5	Bench 1	Bench 2	Bench 3
C	Jaime Echenique ^	Derek Ogbeide ^	Elhadji Fainke †
PF	JT Thor ^	Luca Severini †		Cristian Petacchi ‡
SF	Tomas Woldentensae †	Luca Manfredotti †		Arseniy Hadzhyiev ‡
SG	Rob Edwards *	Riccardo Visconti †		Riccardo Rossato †
PG	Lorenzo Uglietti †	Jaylen Barford *	Speedy Smith *	Troy Caupain *

Notes: LBA clubs can choose between two main roster composition and foreign player formulas:

- 5+5 Formula: 5 Italian players and 5 foreign players.
- 3+4+5 Formula: 5 Italian players, 3 non-EU (European Union) foreigners, and 4 EU foreigners (including countries from the Cotonou Agreement).

Blue † – Homegrown player; (Note: A homegrown player (known in Italy as an atleta di formazione italiana) is defined by where they received their basketball training, rather than their actual passport or nationality. To be officially classified as a homegrown player by the Italian Basketball Federation (FIP), an athlete must complete at least four seasons in an Italian club’s youth academy (between the ages of 14 and 21), appearing in a minimum of 14 games per season. In Champions League, the team did not have any limitations regarding the number of Homegrown players.) Red * – Non-EU foreign player; (Note: A non-EU foreigner is a player from a country with no special trade or labor agreement with the European Union. In professional basketball, this primarily applies to players from the United States, Canada, Australia, and parts of Asia or non-EU Europe who do not possess a secondary European passport.) Purple °; – EU Foreign player (Note: "EU Foreign" players: An EU foreign player is a player who holds citizenship in a European Union (EU) member state (or an associated territory) but is not a citizen of the country where the league is based. Minimum of 4 EU Foreign players must be included on the active roster using the 3+4+5 formula) Gold ^; – Cotonou Agreement player (Note: "Cotonou Agreement" players: A Cotonou Agreement player (often called a "Cotonou player") is a basketball player who holds a passport from one of the 79 African, Caribbean, or Pacific (ACP) nations that signed the Cotonou Agreement with the European Union. In the LBA, these athletes are treated exactly like EU citizens and do not count against strict non-EU import quotas. The Cotonou Agreement is a political and trade treaty originally signed in 2000. Following a legal precedent known as the Kolpak ruling, European courts determined that citizens of countries with trade agreements guaranteeing non-discrimination against workers must have the same right to free movement of labor as EU citizens. Because of this ruling, if an LBA club chooses the 3+4+5 team-building formula, Cotonou players can be signed to fill the 4 EU foreigner roster spots, leaving the team’s 3 non-EU spots completely open for American or other traditional import players.) Green ‡ – youth player (Note: "Youth" players: players who are under the age of 20. In the context of European basketball and the LBA, youth players act as a bridge for clubs to fill out their active game-day rosters while meeting domestic requirements. To satisfy the "Italian player" requirement in the 5+5 or 3+4+5 formulas, a player does not technically have to be born in Italy. They can qualify as "homegrown" (Italian-trained) if they spent at least three consecutive seasons in an Italian club's youth academy between the ages of 15 and 21.)

== First team staff ==
Position	Staff
Head coach	(Greece) Dimitrios Priftis
Assistant coach	(Italy) Federico Fucà
Assistant coach	(Italy) Giuseppe Di Paolo
Assistant coach	(Italy) Marco Rossetti
Physical Trainer	(Italy) Andrea Saresera
Physioterapist	(Italy) Nicolò Fagandini
Team manager	(Italy) Luca Marabotto
Club manager	(Italy) Andrea Tronconi
Referee manager	(Italy) Claudio Panzera

Last updated: 14 March 2018
Source: Pallacanestro Reggiana Website

== Personnel ==
Chairman	(Italy) Veronica Bartoli
Vice-President	(Italy) Enrico San Pietro
Shareholder	(Italy) Graziano Sassi
GM	(Italy) Marco Sambugaro
Head of Operations	(Italy) Davide Draghi
Head of Commercial	(Italy) Francesco Iori
PR manager	(Italy) Gaia Spallanzani
Secretary and Ticketing	(Italy) Fabrizia Paolini
Head of Accounting	(Italy) Diana Basile
Accounting	(Italy) Letizia Lusetti
Head of Scouting and Club Manager	(Italy) Andrea Tronconi
Head of the Academy	(Italy) Andrea Menozzi
Academy coordinator	(Italy) Davide Giudici
Community projects coordinator	(Italy) Emanuele Maccaferri
Head of Media	(Italy) Lorenzo Poliselli
Social Media Manager	(Italy) Valery Lamberti
Club TV commentators	(Italy) Alessandro Caraffi, (Italy) Filippo Bartoli, (Italy) Pietro Chierici
Arena announcer	(Italy) Pierpaolo Zucchetti

== Season by season ==
Season	Domestic competitions				Domestic cup		European competitions		
Season	Tier	League	Pos.	Postseason	Tier	Result	Tier	League	Result
1974–75	6	Promozione	1	—	—	—	–		
1975–76	5	Serie D	1	—	—	—	–		
1976–77	4	Serie C	-	—	—	—	–		
1977–78	4	Serie C	1	—	—	—	–		
1978–79	3	Serie B	4	Finalist	—	—	–		
1979–80	3	Serie B	3		—	—	–		
1980–81	3	Serie B	3		—	—	–		
1981–82	3	Serie B	4	Winner	—	—	–		
1982–83	2	Serie A2	11	—	—	—	–		
1983–84	2	Serie A2	1	Round of 16 (A1)	1	Quarterfinalist	–		
1984–85	1	Serie A1	10	—	1	Group Stage	–		
1985–86	1	Serie A1	9	Round of 16	1	Round of 16	–		
1986–87	1	Serie A1	13	—	1	Semifinalist	–		
1987–88	2	Serie A2	2	Round of 16 (A1)	1	Quarterfinalist	–		
1988–89	1	Serie A1	13	—	1	Round of 16	–		
1989–90	1	Serie A1	9	Round of 16	1	Group Stage	–		
1990–91	1	Serie A1	14	—	1	Semifinalist	–		
1991–92	2	Serie A2	11	—	1	Round of 16	–		
1992–93	2	Serie A2	1	Round of 16 (A1)	1	Round of 32	–		
1993–94	1	Serie A1	11	—	1	Round of 32	–		
1994–95	1	Serie A1	13	—	1	Round of 32	–		
1995–96	2	Serie A2	4	Semifinalist	1	Round of 16	–		
1996–97	2	Serie A2	3	Winner	1	Quarterfinalist	–		
1997–98	1	Serie A1	11	Semifinalist	1	Round of 16	–		
1998–99	1	Serie A1	7	Round of 16	1	Quarterfinalist	3	FIBA Korać Cup	R32
1999–00	1	Serie A1	16	—	–		3	FIBA Korać Cup	R32
2000–01	2	LegaDue	3	Finalist	–		–		
2001–02	2	LegaDue	1	Finalist	–		–		
2002–03	2	LegaDue	5	Quarterfinalist	–		3	FIBA Europe Champions Cup	2GS
2003–04	2	LegaDue	1	DNP	–		–		
2004–05	1	Serie A	13	–	1	Runners-up	–		
2005–06	1	Serie A	11	–	–		2	ULEB Cup	QF
2006–07	1	Serie A	17		–		–		
2007–08	2	LegaDue	4	Semifinalist	–		–		
2008–09	2	LegaDue	14	–	2	Semifinalist	–		
2009–10	2	LegaDue	5	Semifinalist	2	Semifinalist	–		
2010–11	2	LegaDue	13	–	2	Qualifying Round	–		
2011–12	2	LegaDue	1	DNP	2	Quarterfinalist	–		
2012–13	1	Serie A	6	Quarterfinalist	1	Quarterfinalist	–		
2013–14	1	Serie A	7	Quarterfinalist	1	Semifinalist	3	EuroChallenge	W
2014–15	1	Serie A	3	Runners-up	1	Semifinalist	2	EuroCup	1GS
2015–16	1	Serie A	2	Runners-up	1	Quarterfinalist	2	Eurocup	2GS
2016–17	1	LBA	6	Quarterfinalist	1	Semifinalist	–		
2017–18	1	LBA	12	-	–		2	EuroCup	SF
2018–19	1	LBA	13	-	–		–		
2019–20	1	LBA	12	-	–		–		
2020–21	1	LBA	11	-	1	Quarterfinalist	FIBA Europe Cup	QF	
2021–22	1	LBA	7	Quarterfinalist	–		FIBA Europe Cup	RU	
2022–23	1	LBA	14				BCL	GS	
2023–24	1	LBA	5	Quarterfinalist	1	Semifinalist	–		
2024–25	1	LBA	7	Quarterfinalist	1	Quarterfinalist	BCL	QF	
2025–26	1	LBA			–		Champions League	QR	
2025–26	1	LBA			–		4	FIBA Europe Cup	QF

== Honours ==
=== Domestic competitions ===
- LegaDue
  - Champions: 2004, 2012
- Serie A
  - Runners-up: 2015, 2016
- Italian Supercup
  - Winners: 2015
- Italian Cup
  - Runners-up: 2005
- Under 20 Italian Championship
  - Winners: 2003
  - Runners-up: 2016
- Under 21 Italian Championship
  - Winners: 2007

=== European competitions ===
- EuroChallenge
  - Winners: 2014
- FIBA Europe Cup
  - Runners-up: 2022

=== Individual awards ===
Awards earned by members of Pallacanestro Reggiana whilst at the club:

- Serie A
  - Season Top Scorer: Mike Mitchell (1997–98) Scoring Average 24.08
  - Season Top Scorer: Donell Taylor (2012–13) Scoring Average 19.10
  - Best Executive: Alessandro Dalla Salda (2012–13)
- LegaDue
  - Best Coach (2): Fabrizio Frates (2003–04), Massimiliano Menetti (2011–12)
- EuroChallenge
  - Final Four MVP: Andrea Cinciarini (2014)

== Notable players ==
Note: Flags indicate national team eligibility at FIBA-sanctioned events. Players may hold other non-FIBA nationalities not displayed.

Criteria

To appear in this section a player must have either:

- Set a club record or won an individual award while at the club
- Played at least one official international match for their national team at any time
- Played at least one official NBA match at any time.

=== Hall of Fame ===
The following players were inducted into the club's hall of fame:

- (Italy) Piero Montecchi 5 seasons: '82–'87
- (Italy) Gianluca Basile 4 seasons: '95–'99 (Note: As part of the club's 40th anniversary celebrations were named as the best players of the decades: 74–84 (Rustichelli), 84–94 (Basile), 04–14 (Young), all-time (Mitchell))
- (United States) Joe Bryant 2 seasons: '89–'91
- (United States) Mike Mitchell 7 seasons: '92–'99
- (United States) Bob Morse 2 seasons: '84–'86
- (Italy) Pino Brumatti 4 seasons: '83–'87

=== Other notable players ===
2020's

- (United States) Cassius Winston 1 season: '24–'25

2010's

- (Italy) Simone Fontecchio 1 season: '19–'20
- (Israel) Gal Mekel 1 season: '19–'20
- (Italy) Stefano Gentile 2 seasons: '15-'17
- (Italy) Andrea De Nicolao 2 seasons: '15-'17
- (Italy) Pietro Aradori 2 seasons: '15–'17
- (Belarus) Vladimir Veremeenko 1 season: '19–'20
- (Italy) Achille Polonara 3 seasons: '14–'17
- (Lithuania) Darjuš Lavrinovič 2 seasons: '14–'16
- (Lithuania) Kšyštof Lavrinovič 1/2 season: '14
- (Italy) Amedeo Della Valle 4 1/2 seasons: '14–'18
- (Lithuania) Rimantas Kaukėnas 3 seasons: '13–'16
- (Italy) (Argentina) Ariel Filloy 1 season: '13–'14
- (United States) James White 2 season: '13–'14, '17–'18
- (Italy) Andrea Cinciarini 5 seasons: '12–'15, '21-present
- (Switzerland) (United States) Greg Brunner 2 seasons: '12–'14
- (Italy) Michele Antonutti 2 seasons: '12–'14
- (United States) Donell Taylor 2 1/2 seasons: '11–'13, '14
- (United States) Troy Bell 1 1/2 seasons: '11, '13–'14
- (United States) Dawan Robinson 1 1/2 seasons: '11, '12–'13
- (Latvia) Ojārs Siliņš 6 seasons: '10–'16
- (United States) (Puerto Rico) Stephen Thompson Jr.

2000's

- (Lithuania) Donatas Slanina 4 seasons: '09–'13
- (Italy) Nicolò Melli 3 seasons: '07–'10
- (United States) Ricky Minard 2 seasons: '05–'07
- (United States) Terrell McIntyre 1 season: '05–'06
- (United States) Miles Simon 1/2 season: '04
- (Italy) Angelo Gigli 3 1/2 seasons: '03–'06, '14
- (United States) Kiwane Garris 2 seasons: '03–'05
- (Italy) Stefano Rusconi 1 season: '02–'03
- (United States) Alvin Young 5 seasons: '01–'04, '07–'09
- (Italy) Marco Mordente 4 seasons: '00–'01, '02–'05
- (United States) Kris Clack 2 seasons: '00–'02
- (Italy) Sandro Dell'Agnello 2 seasons: '00–'02
- (Finland) Petteri Koponen 1 season: '20–'21
- (Finland) Teemu Rannikko 2 seasons: '00–'02

1990's

- (Italy) Roberto Chiacig 1 1/2 seasons: '99, 11'–12'
- (Slovenia) Boris Gorenc 1/2 season: '99–'00
- (United States) Tracy Moore 2 seasons: '98–'00
- (France) Yann Bonato 1 season: '98–'99
- (Italy) Marcelo Damião 4 seasons: '97–'98, '99–'00, '03–'05
- (United States) Chris Jent 2 seasons: '97–'98, '00–'01
- (United States) (Italy) Pace Mannion 1 season: '96–'97
- (United States) Tony Brown 2 seasons: '92–'94
- (United States) Vincent Askew 1/2 season: '92
- (United States) Tony Massenburg 1/2 season: '92
- (Bulgaria) (Italy) Georgi Glouchkov 1 season: '90–'91

1980's

- (United States) Joe Bryant 2 seasons: 89'–90', 90'–91'
- (United States) Kannard Johnson 1 season: '88–'89
- (United States) Roosevelt Bouie 7 seasons: '82–'89
- (United States) Rudy Hackett 2 seasons: '82–'84

== Head coaches ==
- 1974-1975: (Italy) Marzio D’Arrigo
- 1975-1978: (Italy) Giuseppe Ferretti
- 1978-1981: (Italy) Mondo Vecchi
- 1981-1983: (Italy) Gianni Zappi
- 1983-1986: (Italy) Dado Lombardi
- 1986-1987: (Italy) Cesare Pancotto
- 1987: (Italy) Leo Ergelini
- 1987-1988: (Italy) Piero Pasini
- 1988: (Italy) Massimo Grisanti
- 1989-1991: (United States) Joe Isaac
- 1991-1992: (Italy) Massimo Grisanti
- 1992-1994: (Italy) Virginio Bernardi
- 1994-1995: (North Macedonia) Zare Markovski
- 1995-1997: (Italy) Giordano Consolini
- 1997-2000: (Italy) Dado Lombardi
- 2000-2002: (Italy) Franco Marcelletti
- 2002-2003: (Italy) Luca Dalmonte
- 2003-2006: (Italy) Fabrizio Frates
- 2006: (Italy) Renato Pasquali
- 2006-07: (Italy) Max Menetti
- 2007-2009: (Italy) Franco Marcelletti
- 2009-2010: (Italy) Alessandro Ramagli
- 2010: (Italy) Piero Coen
- 2010-11: (Italy) Alessandro Finelli
- 2011: (Italy) Fabrizio Frates
- 2011-2018: (Italy) Max Menetti
- 2018–2019: (Italy) Devis Cagnardi
- 2019: (Italy) Stefano Pillastrini
- 2019–2020: (Italy) Maurizio Buscaglia
- 2020-2021: (Italy) Antimo Martino
- 2021–2022: (Italy) Attilio Caja
- 2022: (Italy) Max Menetti
- 2022–2023: (Serbia) (Greece) Dragan Šakota
- 2023–present: (Greece) Dimitrios Priftis

== Sponsorship names ==
Throughout the years, due to sponsorship deals, the club has been known as:

- Magazzini Jolly Reggio Emilia: (1974–1977)
- Cantine Riunite Reggio Emilia: (1977–1990)
- Sidis Reggio Emilia: (1990–1993)
- Ceramica Campeginese Reggio Emilia: (1993–1994)
- Metasystem Reggio Emilia: (1994–1995)
- Pallacanestro Reggiana: (1995–1996)
- CFM Reggio Emilia: (1996–1998)
- Zucchetti Reggio Emilia: (1998–1999)
- Bipop Carire Reggio Emilia: (1999–2007)

- Landi Renzo [European competition]: (2005–06)

- Trenkwalder Reggio Emilia: (2007–2013)
- Grissin Bon Reggio Emilia: (2013–2020)
- UNAHOTELS Reggio Emilia: (2020–current)
