= Nenad Dimitrijević =

Macedonian basketball player (born 1998)

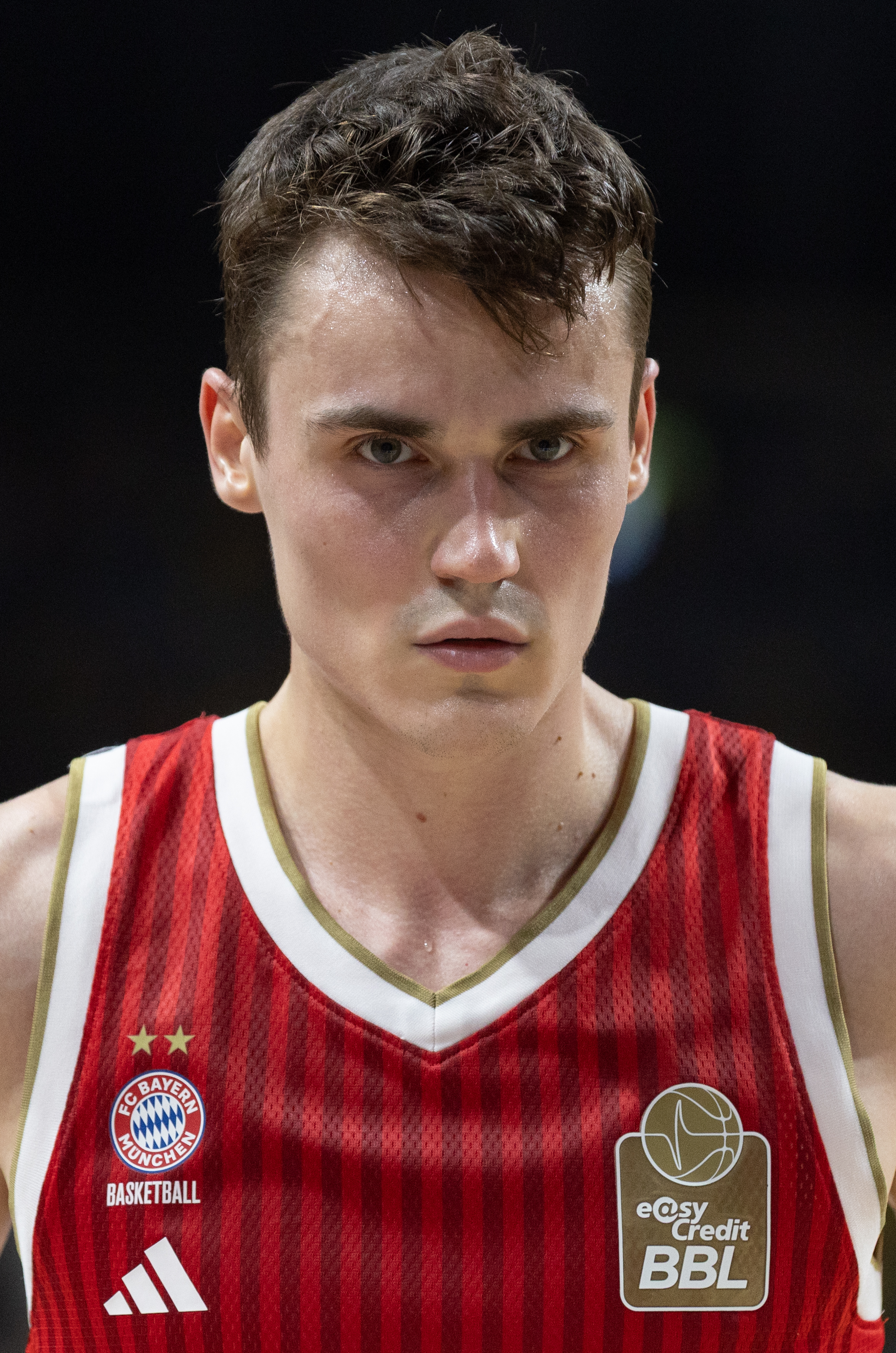
- Dimitrijević with Bayern Munich in 2026

No. 7 – Aris Thessaloniki
- Position: Point guard
- League: Greek Basketball League; EuroCup

Personal information
- Born: 23 February 1998 (age 28) Skopje, Macedonia
- Listed height: 1.90 m (6 ft 3 in)
- Listed weight: 79 kg (174 lb)

Career information
- NBA draft: 2020: undrafted
- Playing career: 2016–present

Career history
- 2016–2021: Joventut Badalona
- 2021–2023: Valencia
- 2022–2023: →UNICS Kazan
- 2023–2024: UNICS Kazan
- 2024–2025: Olimpia Milano
- 2025–2026: Zenit Saint Petersburg
- 2026: →Bayern Munich
- 2026–present: Aris Thessaloniki

Career highlights
- VTB United League champion (2023); VTB United League MVP (2024); VTB United League Playoffs MVP (2023); Italian Supercup winner (2024); Italian Supercup MVP (2024)

Nenad Dimitrijević (Macedonian: Ненад Димитријевиќ; born 23 February 1998) is a Macedonian professional basketball player for Aris Thessaloniki of the Greek Basketball League (GBL) and the EuroCup. He is also a regular member of the North Macedonia national team.

== Professional career ==
=== Joventut Badalona (2016–2021) ===
Dimitrijević began his professional career by signing with the Spanish club Joventut Badalona for the 2016–17 season. He went undrafted in the 2020 NBA draft, as he became automatically eligible at the age of 22.

He stayed with the club for five seasons until the summer of 2021. He appeared in 137 ACB League games over that period with the club, with 2020–21 season being his best season with the club. He averaged 10.4 points and 3.6 assists over 32 league games.

=== Valencia (2021–2023) ===
On 19 June 2021, Dimitrijević signed with the Spanish club Valencia. In his debut season, Dimitrijević averaged 9.5 points and 4.2 assists over 19 games, while shooting 45.1% from the field.

==== Loan to UNICS Kazan (2022–2023) ====
He was loaned to Russian club UNICS Kazan for the 2022–2023 season. UNICS went on to win the VTB United League after defeating Lokomotiv Kuban with 4–1 in the finals series. Dimitrijević was named the VTB United League Playoffs MVP for his performances. Over 50 VTB League games, he averaged 12.9 points, 5.5 assists and 2.5 rebounds per game. With the loan period expired, Valencia decided to release ties with him and Dimitrijević became free agent on 4 June 2023.

After signing for Zenit Saint Petersburg of the VTB United League in 2025, Dimitrijević went out on loan to Bayern Munich of the BBL and EuroLeague in January 2026.

=== Aris Thessaloniki (2026–present) ===
On July 1, 2026, Dimitrijević signed a two-year contract with Aris Thessaloniki of the Greek Basketball League (GBL) and the EuroCup.
