= 2024 Italian Basketball Supercup =

2024 Frecciarossa Supercoppa
Tournament details
- Arena: Unipol Arena; Bologna, Emilia-Romagna, Italy
- Dates: 21–22 September 2024

Final positions
- Champions: Olimpia Milano (5th title)
- Runners-up: Virtus Bologna

Awards and statistics
- MVP: (North Macedonia) Nenad Dimitrijević

The 2024 Italian Basketball Supercup (Italian: Supercoppa di pallacanestro 2024), also known as Frecciarossa Supercoppa 2024 for sponsorship reasons, is the 30th edition of the super cup tournament, organized by the Lega Basket Serie A (LBA). The title was won by Olimpia Milano, which defeated 98–96 Virtus Bologna, winning the title for the 5th time.

== Participant teams ==
Team	Home city	Head coach
EA7 Emporio Armani Milano	Milan	(Italy) Ettore Messina
Reyer Venezia	Venezia	(Croatia) Neven Spahija
Napoli	Naples	(Croatia) Igor Miličić
Virtus Segafredo Bologna	Bologna	(Italy) Luca Banchi

== Final Four ==
Semifinals; 21 September
1	Olimpia Milano	73
4	Reyer Venezia	62
2	Napoli	87
3	Virtus Bologna	96

Final; 22 September
1	Olimpia Milano	98
2	Virtus Bologna	96

== Semifinals ==
=== Olimpia Milano vs. Reyer Venezia ===
21 September 2024	Olimpia Milano	73–62	Reyer Venezia	Bologna
18:00 (CEST)	Scoring by quarter: 20–12, 19–12, 20–16, 14–22
	Pts: Dimitrijević 14; Rebs: Nebo 8 Asts: Shields 4	Boxscore	Pts: Tessitori 12; Rebs: Wheatle 8 Asts: Tessitori, Casarin, Wheatle 2	Arena: Unipol Arena; Referees: Lanzarini, Grigioni, Gonella

=== Napoli vs. Virtus Bologna ===
21 September 2024	Napoli	87–96	Virtus Bologna	Bologna
20:45 (CEST)	Scoring by quarter: 16–29, 18–23, 36–18, 17–26
	Pts: Copeland 30; Rebs: Tote, Woldetensae 5 Asts: Pangos 6	Boxscore	Pts: Shengelia 21; Rebs: Shengelia, Hackett 5 Asts: Shengelia 5	Arena: Unipol Arena; Referees: Attard, Perciavalle, Nicolini

== Final ==
=== Olimpia Milano vs. Virtus Bologna ===
22 September 2024	Olimpia Milano	98–96(OT)	Virtus Bologna	Bologna
18:00 (CEST)	Scoring by quarter: 17–26, 19–21, 28–22, 20–15, Overtime: 14–12
	Pts: Nebo 20; Rebs: Nebo 9 Asts: Dimitrijević, Shields 6	Boxscore	Pts: Polonara 18; Rebs: Shengelia 8 Asts: Hackett 5	Arena: Unipol Arena; Referees: Lanzarini, Attard, Gonella

2024 Italian Supercup champions
Olimpia Milano
5th title
