= Riunite =

Brand of Italian wine

Cantine Cooperative Riunite
- Location: Emilia-Romagna region, Italy
- Founded: 1950
- Known for: Riunite
- Varietal: Lambrusco
- Distribution: International
- Website: http://www.riunite.com

Riunite is a brand of Italian wine imported and sold in a variety of flavors in the United States by Frederick Wildman & Sons of New York City, New York. The brand is known for advertisements of the 1970s and 80s depicting a broad array of social situations and using the tagline: "Riunite on ice, that's nice."

== History ==
Nine wine producers from the Italian region of Emilia-Romagna came together in 1950 as the collective Cantine Cooperative Riunite. Their interest was in exchanging ideas and resources to better all of their respective wine products as well as the producers' fortunes. The cooperative found success in the American export market in 1967 with an amabile-style Lambrusco wine suited to American tastes of the time.

In 1973 the Riunite brand was the top seller in the U.S. among wine imports, largely due to catchy advertising that made the wine a household name. Sales peaked in 1985 at 11.5 million cases, a record which still stands as of 2012.

Riunite has settled into a quieter profile in recent years. However, while the wine has seen a 2001 floor of 1.77 million cases and the ads are no longer the fixture they once were on American television, it has seen a resurgence. In 2006, the look of the bottle and label was redesigned. And in August 2009, VB Imports began a "Reinvent Riunite" campaign which urged people to create commercials based around the famous campaigns of their heyday.

In 2012, an advertising campaign directed at younger women and linked to the introduction of two new varieties based on increased popularity of sweeter varietals, Riunite Sweet Red and Riunite Sweet White, was designed by Modea, a small award-winning advertising agency that specializes in digital campaigns. The slogan, "Just Chill" headlines the campaign which features a website designed to appeal to young women.

In 2015 Riunite redesigned their label, and created all new advertising and website. They also won gold medals in the 2015 San Diego International Wine Competition and the Winemaker Challenge

In 2019, after a partnership spanning over 50 years, Banfi Vintners and Riunite mutually agreed to part ways. “With all the history we have made together, this is a difficult announcement to make,” said Banfi Vintners CEO Cristina Mariani-May. “However, after thoughtful consideration for our long-term goals, both sides concluded that it is time to move on.”
