= Amedeo Della Valle =

Italian basketball player

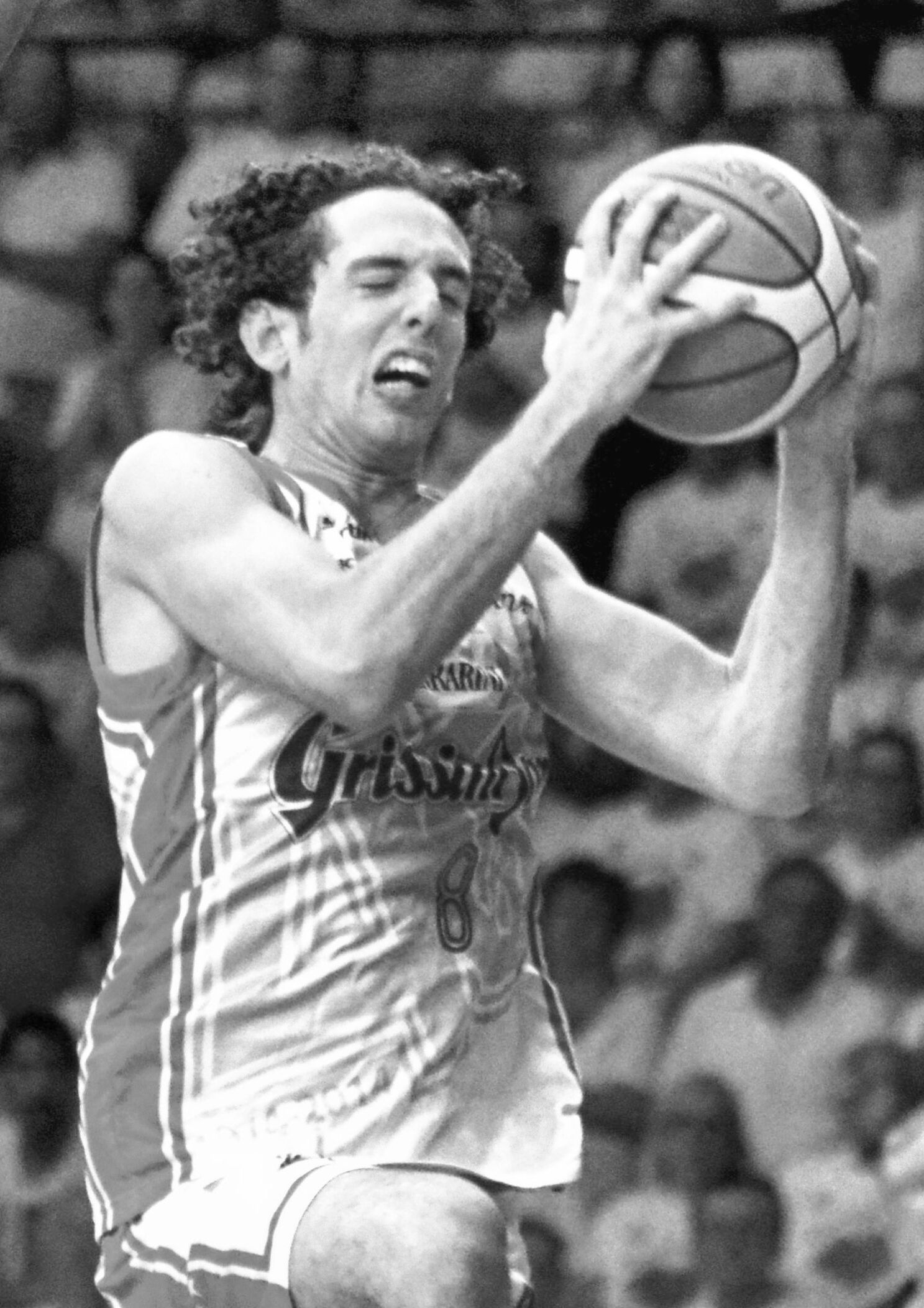
- Della Valle with Reggio Emilia in 2015

No. 8 – Openjobmetis Varese
- Position: Point guard / shooting guard
- League: LBA; Champions League

Personal information
- Born: 11 April 1993 (age 33) Alba, Italy
- Listed height: 1.95 m (6 ft 5 in)
- Listed weight: 90 kg (198 lb)

Career information
- High school: Findlay Prep (Henderson, Nevada)
- College: Ohio State (2012–2014)
- NBA draft: 2014: undrafted
- Playing career: 2009–present

Career history
- 2009–2011: Junior Casale
- 2014–2018: Reggiana
- 2018–2020: Olimpia Milano
- 2020: Gran Canaria
- 2020–2021: Budućnost
- 2021–2026: Brescia
- 2026–present: Varese

Career highlights
- EuroChallenge champion (2014); Lega Serie A MVP (2022); 2× All-Lega Serie A Team (2022, 2026); Lega Serie A Domestic Player of the Year (2026); Montenegrin League champion (2021); Montenegrin Cup winner (2021); Italian Cup winner (2023); Italian Cup MVP (2023); 2× Italian Supercup champion (2015, 2018); Serie A All-Star (2014); Italian Supercup MVP (2015); All-EuroCup First Team (2018); EuroBasket U-20 MVP (2013)
Medals
Men's basketball
Representing Italy
FIBA Europe Under-20 Championship
Gold medal – first place	2013 Estonia
Men's 3x3 basketball
FIBA 3x3 Europe Cup
Bronze medal – third place	2025 Copenhagen	Team

Amedeo Della Valle (born 11 April 1993) is an Italian professional basketball player for Pallacanestro Varese of the Lega Basket Serie A (LBA). He attended Findlay Prep in Henderson, Nevada, before spending two seasons playing college basketball for the Ohio State University.

== High school career ==
Wanting to develop his basketball in a different way, he moved to the United States in 2011, to Findlay Prep high school in Henderson, Nevada. There, he was a starter in their National High School Invitational victory in 2012, breaking the school record for three-pointers in a season, with 66.

== College career ==
This caught the eye of several colleges and, after graduating, he signed a letter of intent to play for Ohio State in the Big Ten Conference of the NCAA Division I, choosing them over scholarship offers from Arizona and Texas A&M. The only player recruited that year by Ohio State, Amedeo took some time to adapt to the rigours of college basketball, especially the physical side having never done weights in the past, he was exclusively used as a bench player in his freshman season. Having put on weight for his sophomore season he started earning more game time although he stayed a bench option, he notably was decisive in overturning an 18-point, second-half deficit to beat Nebraska in the quarter-finals of the Big Ten tournament in what is regarded as his best game for the team. After Ohio State's elimination in the first round of the NCAA Division I tournament against Dayton he announced his intention to return to Italy to play professional basketball.

== Professional career ==
Della Valle returned to Italy, joining Serie A and EuroCup-playing side Grissin Bon Reggio Emilia declaredly because of the team's policy of trusting young Italian players, signing a contract until 2019. During his career Della Valle was named LBA All-Star (2014), Italian Supercup MVP (2015) and All-EuroCup First Team (2018) and he won the EuroChallenge (2014) and the Italian Supercup (2015).

On 16 June 2018 the president of Olimpia Milano, Livio Proli, said the club reached an agreement with Della Valle for the 2018–19 season. On 22 June 2018 Olimpia Milano officially announced Della Valle as new player.

On 11 July 2020 he signed with Herbalife Gran Canaria of the Spanish Liga ACB. After six games, he parted ways with the team on 23 October. Della Valle subsequently signed with Budućnost of the Adriatic League.

Della Valle returned to Italy for the season 2021–22 with Basket Brescia Leonessa. He was announced on 23 June 2021. He won the LBA Most Valuable Player of the 2021–22 season after scoring 18.5 points per game (second-highest in the league) on 66% shooting. Della Valle also averaged 4.0 assists per game, a career-high.

In the following season, the 2022–23 season, Della Valle had another successful season. On 19 February 2023, won the Italian Basketball Cup with Brescia and was named the tournament's MVP.

On July 6, 2026, he signed with Pallacanestro Varese of the Lega Basket Serie A (LBA).

== National team career ==
Della Valle started playing for the youth squads of the Italian national team, first with the Under-16's in 2009. He notably won the gold medal with the U20's at the 2013 European Championship where he was an important contributor winning the MVP award.

He was called up to the squad that would take part in EuroBasket 2015 to start on 5 September.

== Personal life ==
His father is Carlo Della Valle (in Italian), who had a career in the first division, he also was a guard noted for compensating his lack of athleticism with excellent technique.

Amedeo originally had no plans of going abroad to play, but a holiday in Miami with his mother in 2006 motivated him to move to the U.S. for lifestyle and athletic reasons.

Della Valle, a crowd favourite at Ohio State University due to his atypical look and personality, unsuccessfully ran for student-body president in a less than serious campaign in 2014, promises such as official Amedeo snow days took him to fifth place.

"La Faccia Cattiva di Amedeo Della Valle", a Facebook page with almost 13.000 followers and a clothing brand, is based on his trademark three-pointer celebration.

== Career statistics ==
Legend
GP	Games played	GS	Games started	MPG	Minutes per game
FG%	Field-goal percentage	3P%	3-point field-goal percentage	FT%	Free-throw percentage
RPG	Rebounds per game	APG	Assists per game	SPG	Steals per game
BPG	Blocks per game	PPG	Points per game	PIR	Performance index rating
**Bold**	Career high

=== Euroleague ===
Year	Team	GP	GS	MPG	FG%	3P%	FT%	RPG	APG	SPG	BPG	PPG	PIR
2018–19	Olimpia Milano	12	0	6.0	.364	.357	1.000	0.8	0.3	0.1	0.2	2.1	1.8

=== College ===
Legend
GP	Games played	GS	Games started	MPG	Minutes per game
FG%	Field goal percentage	3P%	3-point field goal percentage	FT%	Free throw percentage
RPG	Rebounds per game	APG	Assists per game	SPG	Steals per game
BPG	Blocks per game	PPG	Points per game	**Bold**	Career high

Year	Team	GP	GS	MPG	FG%	3P%	FT%	RPG	APG	SPG	BPG	PPG
2013	Ohio State	15	0	7.2	**37.5**	**38.5**	50.0	1.47	**0.26**	**0.26**	**0.4**	2.5
2014	Ohio State	33	0	**11.9**	34.7	32.4	**65.8**	**1.76**	0.18	0.21	0.24	**4.0**
Career		48	0	9.55	36.1	35.45	57.9	1.61	0.22	0.23	0.32	3.25
