= PalaRuffini =

Sports venue in Turin, Italy

Palasport Ruffini
- PalaRuffini
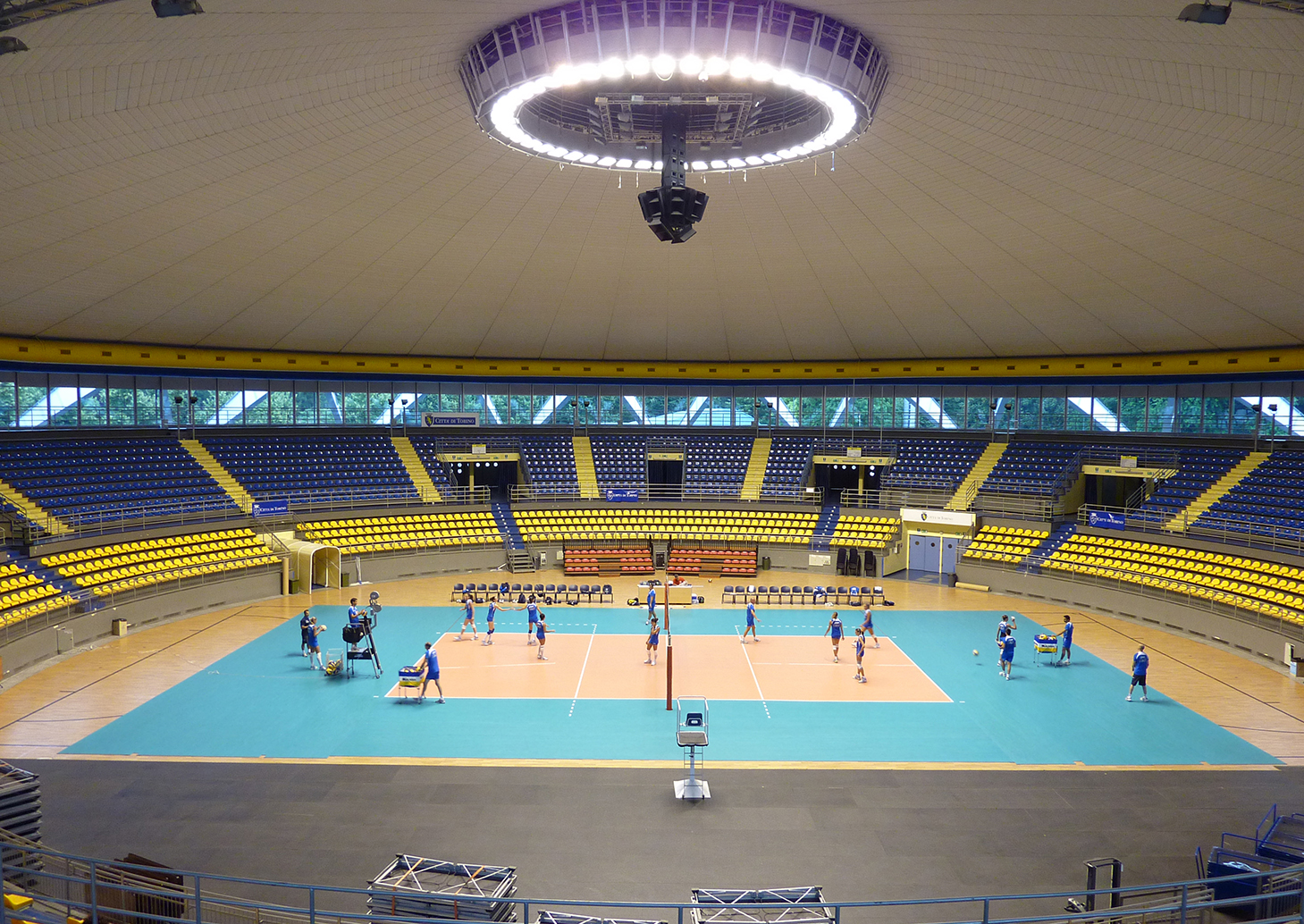
- Interactive map of Palasport Ruffini
- Full name: Palazzetto dello sport Parco Ruffini
- Former names: Palasport di Torino
- Location: Turin, Piedmont
- Coordinates: 45°3′27.87″N 7°37′56.79″E
- Capacity: 4,500

Construction
- Opened: 1961
- Renovated: 2004
- Architect: Annibale Vitellozzi

Tenants
- Auxilium Torino (1974–1999, 2015–2018); Basket Torino (2019–present)

PalaRuffini, formerly known as Palasport di Torino, is a multi-purpose indoor arena located in Turin, Italy. It is used for basketball, volleyball, boxing, and concerts. The arena's seating capacity is 4,500 people.

== History ==
Exterior of the arena

The arena was opened in 1961. Dalida had a sold-out concert in October 1970 as a part of her world tour. It hosted the latter stages of the EuroBasket 1979. It also hosted the 1992–93 season's FIBA European Cup final, in which Sato Aris defeated Efes Pilsen, by a score of 50–48.

The arena was renovated in the year 2004. On 17 September 2008, the senior men's Italian national basketball team played a 2009 EuroBasket qualification game against Bulgaria, at the arena. The arena has also been used as the long-time home arena of the Italian professional basketball club Auxilium Pallacanestro Torino.

== See also ==
- List of indoor arenas in Italy

Preceded by Country Hall du Sart Tilman; Liège	EuroBasket; Final venue 1979	Succeeded by Sportovní hala Prague
Preceded by Palais des Sports de Beaulieu; Nantes	FIBA European Cup; Final venue 1993	Succeeded by CIG de Malley; Lausanne
