= Italian Basketball Supercup =

Basketball competition

- Current season, competition or edition: 2025 Italian Basketball Supercup
- Sport: Basketball
- Founded: 1995
- No. of teams: 4
- Country: Italy
- Confederation: FIBA Europe
- Most recent champions: Olimpia Milano (6 titles)
- Most titles: Mens Sana 1871; Olimpia Milano (6 titles)
- Broadcaster: Eurosport
- Sponsor: Discovery+
- Related competitions: LBA; Italian Cup

The Italian Basketball Supercup (Italian: Supercoppa Italiana di Pallacanestro), also known as Discovery+ Supercoppa for sponsorship reasons, is a professional basketball super cup competition. From the 2020 Supercup edition, all the teams of LBA took part in the competition. Created in 1995, it is organised by the Lega Basket – who run the LBA and the Italian Cup – in partnership with RCS Sport, and it traditionally opens the season.

== History ==
The 2014 edition of the Supercup was played on October 4 and 5, at Sassari's PalaSerradimigni, in a final four format. Italian League and Italian Cup runners-up Montepaschi Siena (also defending champions), did not participate, after declaring bankruptcy over the summer. Italian League champions EA7 Emporio Armani Milano, comfortably dispatched Enel Brindisi (third in the 2014 cup), by a score of 71–59, in the first semifinal, on the back of Linas Kleiza's and Joe Ragland's long-distance shooting (17 and 16 points respectively), in a mistake-strewn game.

The other semifinal saw cup-holders Banco di Sardegna Sassari, have an easy 89–73 win over Acea Roma (league semifinalist), with the hosts always leading, and Sassari head coach Romeo Sacchetti, rotating his squad.

The final saw Sassari add a second title to their prior cup win, by downing Milano 96–88. The Sardinians started the game on the front foot, leading the first quarter, 29–14, while Milano struggled to score (0-for-6 from three). They continued to drive the game at the start of the second quarter, but Milano found a way back into the game, thanks to stronger defense and a stellar MarShon Brooks, to answer with a 15–0 run from, 36-18 down, with Sassari then finding their scoring shoes to finish the half 50–40. Three's from Ragland and Kleiza helped Milano claw back at the lead, but Brooks missed the shot to equalise, with the quarter ending on 72–68. Sassari would stay in front for the rest of the game, with Supercup MVP Jerome Dyson entertaining the fans. Brooks led all scorers with 26 points, followed for Milano by Ragland (17) and Kleizia (16), whilst Dyson paced the winners with 25, and three other players had 14 points.

The 2015 edition took place in Turin's PalaRuffini, on 26 and 27 September. It pitted Banco di Sardegna Sassari (both league and cup holders) against Grissin Bon Reggio Emilia (league runners-up) and EA7 Emporio Armani Milano (cup finalist and league semifinalist) against Umana Reyer Venezia (league semifinalist) in the semifinals.

=== Format ===
In 2000, the Supercup was organised on a bigger scale, with all but one of the Serie A and Serie A2 teams participating (Viola Reggio Calabria were caught up in a tournament in Buenos Aires), with the league and cup holders already qualified for the semifinals. The next year, the four best-ranked teams in the league took part in a Supercup final four.

The 2014 edition saw the Supercup contested by four squads, with the league champion playing the runner up of the cup, and the cup winner playing the league regular season runner-up (barring that, the next best placed team in the cup and the league are chosen in that order). The format was confirmed for the following editions.

In 2020 edition all the teams of LBA took part in the Supercup, due to the early conclusion of the 2019–20 LBA season caused by COVID-19 pandemic. The competition consists of 4 round robin groups that qualify 4 teams to the Final Four that was held in Bologna at the Segafredo Arena. The format was confirmed for the 2021 edition, with a Final Eight in place of a Final Four.

== Media scrutiny ==
Some observers have derided the Italian Basketball Supercup as a, "minor trophy", in contrast to the Italian Cup. Journalist's such as the Corriere di Bologna's, Daniele Labanti, and Panorama's Paolo Corio, reacted to the low spectator turnout at the 2014 edition (as part of a general trend), organised in Sassari, by unfavorably comparing its appeal to that of the top level Italian league, the top level Italian Cup, and the EuroLeague (in which the home team would be involved).

The formula and venue was also criticised, with calls to organise a single final, in a city bereft of a professional club basketball (such as Bari or Palermo), or even abroad, in the manner of the Italian football Supercup.

== Title holders ==
Mens Sana are the record-holders with seven cups, Treviso and Milano follow with four titles, Virtus Bologna have participated in the most finals (11), winning the cup three times.

- 1995: Buckler Beer Bologna
- 1996: Riello Mash Verona
- 1997: Benetton Treviso
- 1998: Teamsystem Bologna
- 1999: Varese Roosters
- 2000: Aeroporti di Roma Virtus
- 2001: Benetton Treviso
- 2002: Benetton Treviso
- 2003: Oregon Scientific Cantù
- 2004: Montepaschi Siena
- 2005: Climamio Bologna
- 2006: Benetton Treviso
- 2007: Montepaschi Siena
- 2008: Montepaschi Siena
- 2009: Montepaschi Siena
- 2010: Montepaschi Siena
- 2011: Montepaschi Siena
- 2012: Lenovo Cantù
- 2013: Montepaschi Siena (revoked)
- 2014: Banco di Sardegna Sassari
- 2015: Grissin Bon Reggio Emilia
- 2016: EA7 Emporio Armani Milano
- 2017: EA7 Emporio Armani Milano
- 2018: AX Armani Exchange Milano
- 2019: Banco di Sardegna Sassari
- 2020: AX Armani Exchange Milano
- 2021: Virtus Segafredo Bologna
- 2022: Virtus Segafredo Bologna
- 2023: Virtus Segafredo Bologna
- 2024: EA7 Emporio Armani Milano
- 2025: EA7 Emporio Armani Milano

== The finals ==
- Player nationalities by national team.

Season	Champions	Score	Runners-up	Venue	Location	MVP
(Italy) Supercoppa Italiana di Pallacanestro
1995	Buckler Beer Bologna	90–72	Benetton Treviso	PalaMalaguti	Casalecchio di Reno	(United States) Orlando Woolridge
1996	Riello Mash Verona	79–72	Stefanel Milano	FilaForum	Assago	(Italy) Giacomo Galanda
1997	Benetton Treviso	78–58	Kinder Bologna	FilaForum	Assago	(Italy) Denis Marconato
1998	Teamsystem Bologna	66–59	Kinder Bologna	PalaMalaguti	Casalecchio di Reno	(Italy) Alessandro Abbio
1999	Varese Roosters	68–61	Kinder Bologna	PalaIgnis	Varese	(Italy) Andrea Meneghin
2000	Aeroporti di Roma Virtus	82–78	Kinder Bologna	Palasport Mens Sana	Siena	(United States) Jerome Allen
2001	Benetton Treviso	88–71	Scavolini Pesaro	PalaFiera	Genoa	(United States) Tyus Edney
2002	Benetton Treviso	100–72	Virtus Bologna	PalaFiera	Genoa	(United States) Tyus Edney (2x)
2003	Oregon Scientific Cantù	85–79	Benetton Treviso	PalaVerde	Treviso	(United States) Nate Johnson
2004	Montepaschi Siena	85–77	Benetton Treviso	Palasport Mens Sana	Siena	(United States) David Vanterpool
2005	Climamio Bologna	84–75	Benetton Treviso	PalaDozza	Bologna	(Italy) Marco Belinelli
2006	Benetton Treviso	76–73	Eldo Napoli	PalaVerde	Treviso	(United States) Marcus Goree
2007	Montepaschi Siena	96–50	Benetton Treviso	Palasport Mens Sana	Siena	(United States) Shaun Stonerook
2008	Montepaschi Siena	108–72	Air Avellino	Palasport Mens Sana	Siena	(United States) Terrell McIntyre
2009	Montepaschi Siena	87–65	Canadian Solar Bologna	Palasport Mens Sana	Siena	(Central African Republic) Romain Sato
2010	Montepaschi Siena	82–64	Canadian Solar Bologna	Palasport Mens Sana	Siena	(North Macedonia) Bo McCalebb
2011	Montepaschi Siena	73–70	Bennet Cantù	PalaFiera	Forlì	(Lithuania) Kšyštof Lavrinovič
2012	Lenovo Cantù	80–73	Montepaschi Siena	105 Stadium	Rimini	(Georgia (country)) Manuchar Markoishvili
2013	Montepaschi Siena (revoked)	81–66	Cimberio Varese	Palasport Mens Sana	Siena	(Italy) Daniel Hackett
2014	Banco di Sardegna Sassari	96–88	EA7 Emporio Armani Milano	PalaSerradimigni	Sassari	(United States) Jerome Dyson
2015	Grissin Bon Reggio Emilia	80–68	EA7 Emporio Armani Milano	PalaRuffini	Turin	(Italy) Amedeo Della Valle
2016	EA7 Emporio Armani Milano	90–72	Sidigas Avellino	Mediolanum Forum	Assago	(Croatia) Krunoslav Simon
2017	EA7 Emporio Armani Milano	82–77	Umana Reyer Venezia	Unieuro Arena	Forlì	(North Macedonia) Jordan Theodore
2018	AX Armani Exchange Milano	82–71	Fiat Torino	PalaLeonessa	Brescia	(Serbia) Vladimir Micov
2019	Banco di Sardegna Sassari	83–80	Umana Reyer Venezia	PalaFlorio	Bari	(United States) Curtis Jerrells
2020	AX Armani Exchange Milano	75–68	Virtus Segafredo Bologna	Segafredo Arena	Bologna	(United States) Malcolm Delaney
2021	Virtus Segafredo Bologna	90–84	AX Armani Exchange Milano	Unipol Arena	Bologna	(Italy) Alessandro Pajola
2022	Virtus Segafredo Bologna	72–69	Banco di Sardegna Sassari	PalaLeonessa	Brescia	(United States) Semi Ojeleye
2023	Virtus Segafredo Bologna	97–60	Germani Brescia	PalaLeonessa	Brescia	(Georgia (country)) Tornike Shengelia
2024	Olimpia Milano	98–96	Virtus Bologna	Unipol Arena	Bologna	(North Macedonia) Nenad Dimitrijević
2025	Olimpia Milano	90–76	Germani Brescia	Unipol Forum	Milan	(United Kingdom) Quinn Ellis

Note: boxscores from Lega Basket (retrieved 21 September 2021)

== Performance by club ==
Rank	Club	Titles	Runner-up	Champion Years
1.	Mens Sana 1871	6	1	2004, 2007, 2008, 2009, 2010, 2011, 2013 (revoked)
2.	Olimpia Milano	6	3	2016, 2017, 2018, 2020, 2024, 2025
3.	Virtus Bologna	4	8	1995, 2021, 2022, 2023
4.	Treviso	4	5	1997, 2001, 2002, 2006
5.	Cantù	2	1	2003, 2012
6.	Fortitudo Bologna	2	0	1998, 2005
7.	Dinamo Sassari	2	1	2014, 2019
8.	Varese	1	1	1999
9.	Scaligera Verona	1	0	1996
10.	Virtus Roma	1	0	2000
11.	Reggiana	1	0	2015
12.	Felice Scandone	0	2	
13.	Reyer Venezia	0	2	
14.	Brescia	0	2	
15.	Torino	0	1	
16.	Victoria Libertas	0	1	
17.	Napoli	0	1	

== See also ==
- Italian Basketball League (LBA)
- Italian Basketball League (Serie A2)
- Italian Basketball Cup
- Italian Basketball Federation
- Italian Basketball All Star Game
- Italian LNP Cup
