= AIFS =

AIFS may refer to:

- Auckland Integrated Fares System, a predecessor to the proposed public transport payment system for New Zealand
- Australian Integrated Forecast System (meteorology)
- American Institute For Foreign Study, est. 1964
- Arbitration Inter Frame Spacing, a method of prioritizing transmissions on a wireless network
- Associazione Italiana Football Sala, the old name for the current Federazione Italiana Football Sala
- Australian Institute of Family Studies
