= ChorusLife Arena =

Indoor arena, Bergamo, Italy

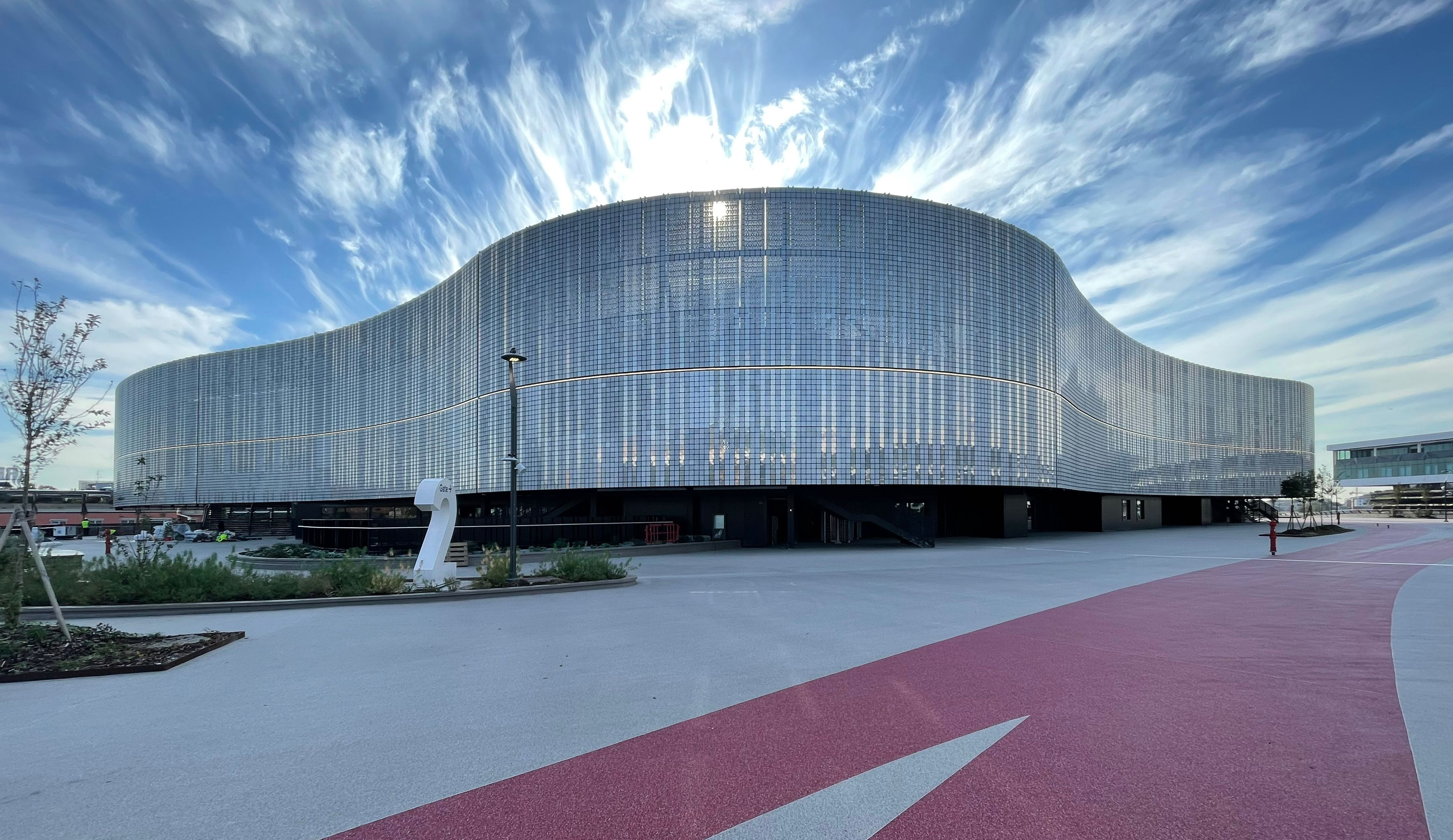
- ChorusLife Arena – dynamic facade
- Interactive map of ChorusLife Arena
- Location: Bergamo, Lombardy, Italy
- Coordinates: 45.70372°N 9.69094°E
- Owner: ChorusLife s.p.a.
- Capacity: 5,000 / 6,500

Construction
- Opened: 2024
- Architect: Joseph di Pasquale

The ChorusLife Arena is a multifunctional arena built within the ChorusLife smart district in Bergamo, designed by the Italian architect Joseph di Pasquale.

== Technical features ==
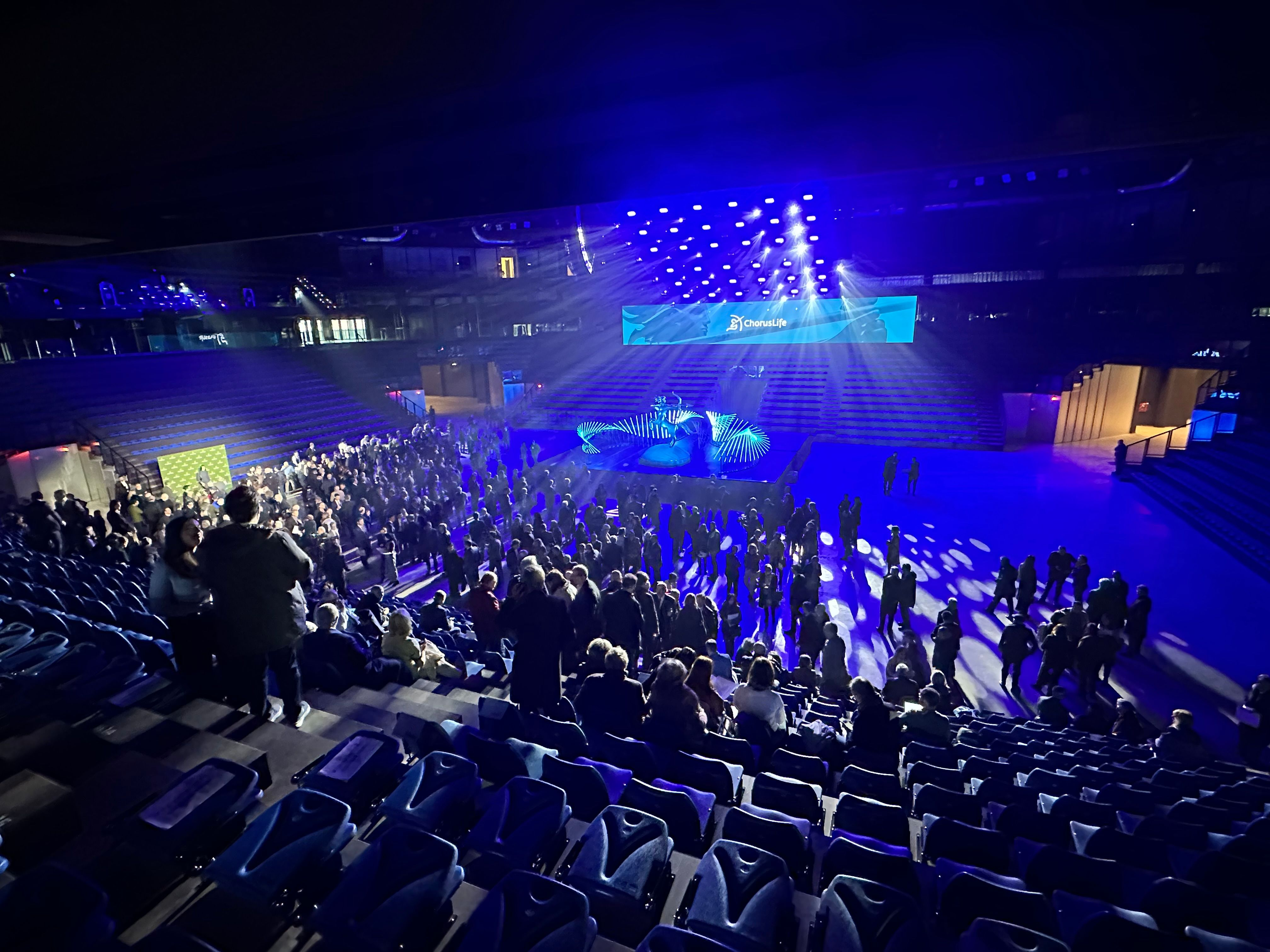
Choruslife Arena, the interior

It has a maximum capacity of 5,000 seats in sports configuration and 6,500 seats for shows and concerts.

The internal stands are retractable, which allows for a variety of configurations for different uses. Service accessibility to the parterre is direct from the road, even for heavy vehicles. The cavea has a hybrid theater/amphitheater typology with the first ring that extends on four sides at 360° around the parterre (amphitheater), and the second ring that extends on three sides at 180° (theater).

== The kinetic facade ==
The external cladding consists of a kinetic facade composed of thousands of aluminum tiles that can oscillate. The convective motions of the air and the wind create movement effects thanks to the modification of the angle of reflection of the light of each individual tile due to the oscillation.

== See also ==
- ChorusLife
- List of indoor arenas in Italy
