= Italian National Futsal AMF =

National Italian five-a-side football team

The Italian National Football Indoor AMF is national Italian team of five-a-side football in the South American version, with the rules of the AMF. It is headed by the Federazione Italiana Football Sala and represents Italy in official or friendly competitions that are reserved for national selections.

Its activities began in 1987 and only one year later it participated in its first international competition: the World Football Championship of five-a-side football held in Australia. There it finished in ninth place. In 1989, instead, it took part in its first European Championship, played in Spain, where it finished in sixth place.

After attending the European Championships, which took place in Portugal in 1990, where it finished in eighth place, the FIFS has had the honour to organize the World Championship FIFUSA of 1991, where Italy ended twentieth. With the achievement of the sixth place in the European Championship of the following year (1992), Italy got qualification for the 1994 World Cup in Argentina, its last appearance in the world competitions organized by FIFUSA. The result obtained by the participation at this World was truly disappointing: the Italian team was eliminated in the first round. In addition, it participated in three editions of the Latin Cup, in 1991, 1992 and 1998.

The Italian National team was no longer reunited during the inactive period of the Federazione Italiana Football Sala but with the arrival of Axel Paderni (2009) the FIFS has resumed its activities and with it also the national team, participating in three editions of the Cup Mundialito Tournament organized by the International Futsal World League Association. In 2010 Italy ranks fourth in Cornaredo and for two consecutive years (2011–2012) first in the editions held Agrate Brianza.

Since October 2012, with the recognition of FIFS by the AMF, it has officially returned in all international competitions of the Asociacion Mundial de Futsal and the 9 and 10 March 2013, in Romorantin-Lanthenay, are played two official matches AMF against France that ended 6 to 3 and 5 to 2 in favor of France. In the same month of the same year it was played and it is won the fourth Mundialito, held in Lainate and sponsored by the AMF, also attended by Switzerland, Monaco, Bolivia, Ecuador, El Salvador and of course, Italy too. In November 2013 after 19 years of absence at an event FIFUSA/AMF it has participated at the World Championship Female AMF, played at Barrancabermeja in Colombia, finishing in 12th place and winning the Fair Play Cup.

In April 2014, 23 years after the World Cup Male FIFUSA of 1991, it is organized an international AMF event, in Italy at Novarello Villaggio Azzurro, the Mundialito Cup Tournament that saw the National reach the Final and then finishing it at 2nd place.

In October 2014, the Italian National Football Indoor has been involved in the European Qualification UEFS in Lloret de Mar where it was not able to obtained the qualificationfor the World Championship AMF of April 2015 in Belarus, finishing in 4th place after Czech Republic, Norway and France.

In October 2014 it participated in the National category C20 at the World Championship in Chile in the city of Concepcion where it ended in 10th place.

In April 2015 it won its fourth Mundialito in Lainate (Italy) beating in the Final 14 to 12 the National of Switzerland.

In December 2015, the National Men's Under-21, after 20 years of absence from official competitions, it participated at the European Championship UEFS in Lloret de Mar in Spain, finishing in 5th place.

In March 2016 it finished in second place at the Mundialito held at Novarello Villaggio Azzurro, defeated, 7 to 4, from Belgium.

The National Italian Men after 21 years of absence won an historic second place in the European Championship UEFS which was held in Russia in Moscow from 23 to 28 May 2016.

== Notable players ==
- Giuseppe Caggiano: Captain of the National team from 1987 to 1999, he holds 52 appearances with it;
- Giovanni Oliva: Captain from 2008 to 2014, he holds 54 appearances;
- Stefano Usai: Captain since 2014, boasts 51 appearances to date and he is also the player who has the highest number of Trophies won with 2 Mundialiti Cup, 3 Championship Titles Club, one Italian Cup and one Italian Super Cup for Club;
- Luca Licini: boasts the largest period of militancy, he debuted in June 1993 and his last presence was in December 2015. He played in 3 different decades 90s, 2000s, 2010s; in addition, he holds the all – time record for attendance with 63 presences so far.

== Results of international competitions ==
=== AMF Futsal World Cup ===
- 1988 – 14th place (Australia)
- 1991 – 20th place (Italy)
- 1994 – 14th place (Argentina)

=== UEFS Futsal Men's Championship ===
- 1989 – 5th place (Spain)
- 1990 – 8th place (Portugal)
- 1992 – 5th place (Portugal)
- 2014 – 4th place European qualification (Spain)
- 2016 – 2nd place (Russia)

=== Mundialito Cup Tournament Men AMF ===
- 2010 – 4th place – Cornaredo, Italy
- 2011 – 1st place – Agrate Brianza, Italy
- 2012 – 1st place – Agrate Brianza, Italy
- 2013 – 1st place – Lainate, Italy
- 2014 – 2nd place – Novarello, Italy
- 2015 – 1st place – Lainate, Italy
- 2016 – 2nd posto – Novarello, Italy

=== Other achievements ===
- 1988 – 3rd place – Latin Cup UEFS (Spain)
- 1989 – 3rd place – Latin Cup UEFS (Spain)
- 1990 – 3rd place – Latin Cup UEFS (Spain)
- 1991 – 3rd place – Latin Cup UEFS (Italy)
- 1992 – 3rd place – Latin Cup UEFS (Spain)
- 1993 – 3rd place – Latin Cup UEFS (Spagna)
- 1993 – 2nd place – King's Cup FIFUSA (Morocco)
- 1994 – 3rd place – Latin Cup UEFS (Spain)
- 1995 – 3rd place – Latin Cup UEFS (Spain)
- 1996 – 3rd place – Latin Cup UEFS (Spain)
- 1997 – 4th place – Latin Cup UEFS (Spain)
- 1998 – 4th place – Latin Cup UEFS (Spain)
- 1999 – 3rd place – Latin Cup UEFS (Portugal)
- 1999 – 1st place – Campionato Europeo IFVL (Italy)
- 2013 – 3rd place – Cup of the Alps AMF (Switzerland)
- 2013 – 12th place – Women's World Championship (Colombia)
- 2014 – 9th place – World Championship U20 (Chile)
- 2015 – 5th place – European Championship U21 UEFS (Lloret de Mar, Spain)
- 2016 – 3rd place – Latin Cup AMF (Italy)
