= Palasport Flaminio =

Indoor sporting arena in Rimini, Italy

- PalaFlaminio
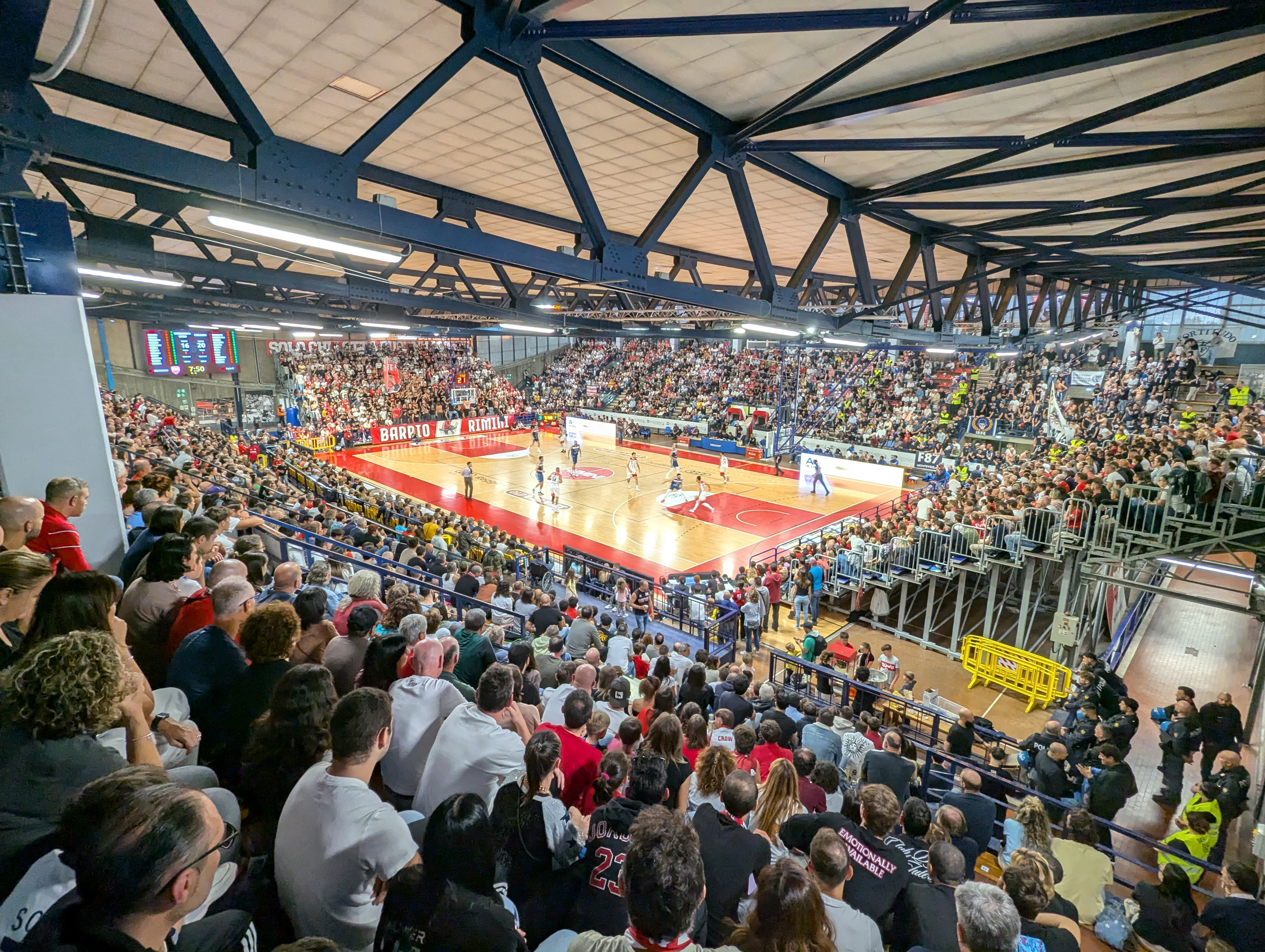
- Interactive map of Palasport Flaminio
- Full name: Palazzetto dello Sport Flaminio
- Location: Rimini, Emilia-Romagna
- Coordinates: 44°3′6.52″N 12°34′30.9″E
- Capacity: 3,500

Construction
- Opened: 1977

Tenant
- Basket Rimini (1977–2003, 2011–present)

Palasport Flaminio is an indoor sporting arena located in Rimini, Italy. The seating capacity of the arena for basketball games is 3,500 people.

== History ==
Palasport Flaminio was built in two different sections: the first part, including only the swimming pool and a gym, was completed in 1972, while a second part, that includes the main sports hall, was officially opened on September 25, 1977. It immediately became the new home sports hall of Basket Rimini. The team, which was playing in Serie B at the time, achieved promotion to Serie A2 for the first time in its history at the end of that season.

Among the various disciplines, the arena was also used for handball: two different teams from the town of Rimini (Pallamano Rimini and Handball Club Rimini) were both competing in Serie A during those years.

At the end of the 1983–84 season, Basket Rimini earned promotion to Serie A1, the highest-tier level of the Italian basketball league system. In the following years, the team continued to play mainly between Serie A1 and Serie A2. Multiple basketball champions played at Flaminio as opponents, such as Naismith Memorial Hall of Fame members Bob McAdoo, Oscar Schmidt, George Gervin, Dino Radja and Dominique Wilkins, as well as some NBA All-Stars including Mike Mitchell, Micheal Ray Richardson and Manu Ginóbili, and other great players like Darryl Dawkins and Toni Kukoč. Between 1998 and 2000, Basket Rimini also qualified for the FIBA Korać Cup, the third-tier level club competition in European basketball.

The arena also hosted concerts, especially during its first decades. Notable performers included James Brown and Ray Charles.

The local basketball team (in the meantime renamed Basket Rimini Crabs) left the Palasport Flaminio in February 2003, moving to the new and more capacious 105 Stadium. They played in Legadue (the new name of Serie A2) at the new arena until 2011, then the club had economic problems and restarted from the fourth tier of Italian basketball. Playing in the minor leagues, the team returned to play at the Palasport Flaminio.

A new club was created in 2018 under the name Rinascita Basket Rimini, which subsequently acquired the historic title of the Crabs. Through this new project, the team achieved two promotions in four years, therefore the Palasport Flaminio returned to hosting Serie A2 matches.

== See also ==
- List of indoor arenas in Italy
