= RDS Stadium =

Multi-purpose sports and entertainment arena in Rimini, Italy

- 105 Stadium
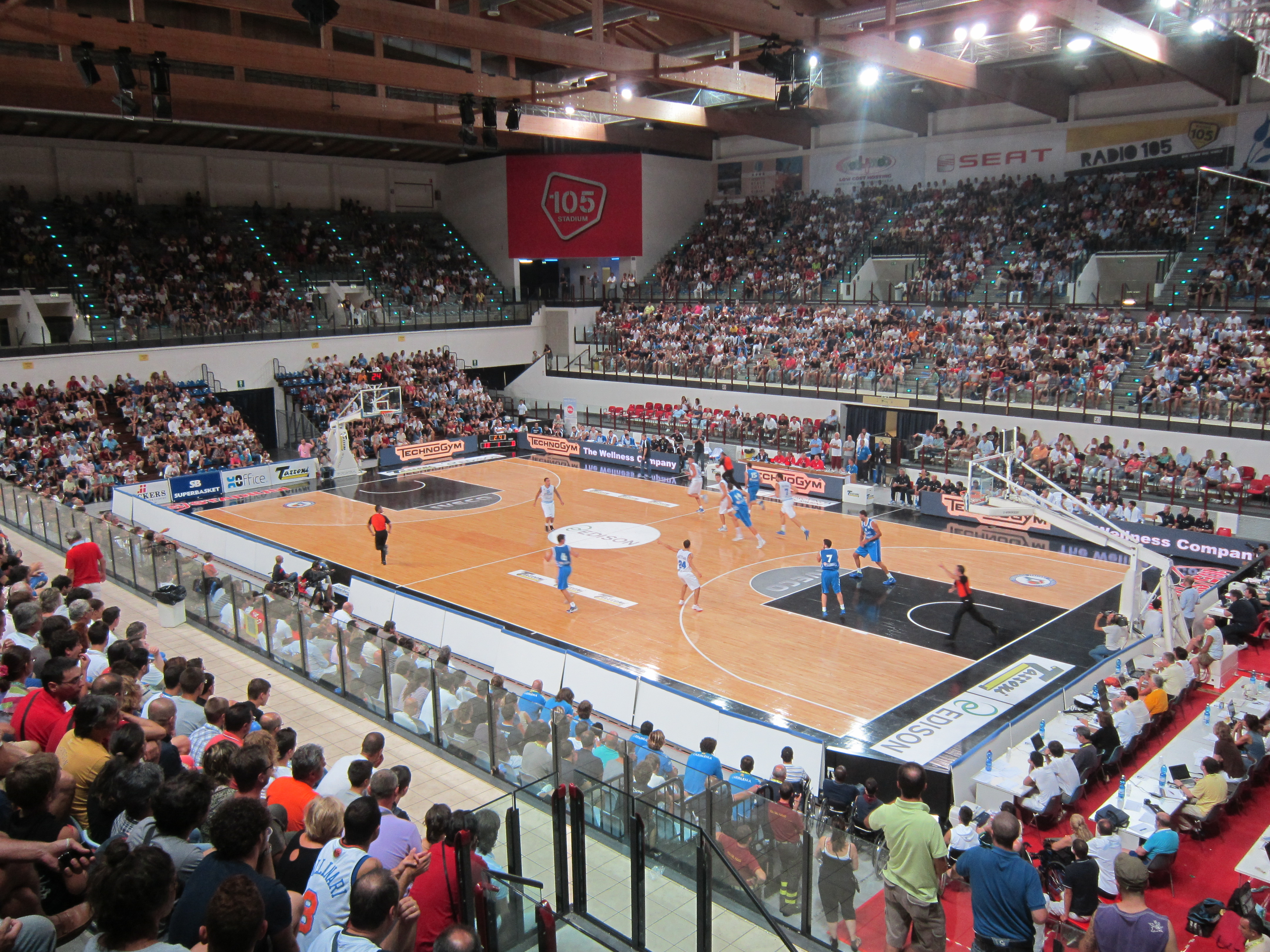
- Interactive map of RDS Stadium
- Location: Rimini, Emilia-Romagna
- Coordinates: 44°2′22.76″N 12°34′53.32″E
- Capacity: Concerts: 7,500; Basketball: 4,703–5,001

Construction
- Groundbreaking: 2000
- Opened: 2002

Tenant
- Basket Rimini Crabs (2003–2011)

RDS Stadium (formerly 105 Stadium) is a multi-purpose sports and entertainment arena located in Rimini, Italy. The arena has a capacity of 4,703 (expandable to 5,001 people) in the basketball configuration and up to 7,500 for concerts.

== History ==
The arena broke ground in April 2000. At the time, Basket Rimini was still playing in Serie A1, the highest-tier level of the Italian basketball league system. Nevertheless, the organizing body of the league (Lega Basket) was planning to remove the exemption that allowed clubs to play in sports halls with a capacity of less than 5,000 seats: this was one of the reasons that led to the construction of a new sports hall.

It was inaugurated on December 14, 2002, with a concert by Biagio Antonacci. The first ever basketball game played in the facility was a friendly match between Basket Rimini Crabs and Montepaschi Siena on January 23, 2003, whereas the first official game was a victory against Scafati Basket on the following February 2. In those years the team was playing in the second-tier of the Italian league pyramid, having been relegated at the end of the 2000–01 season.

In April 2010, 105 Stadium hosted the Italian Women's Volleyball Cup Final Four.

After the 2010–11 season, Basket Rimini Crabs was unable to participate in the second-tier of the Italian basketball league due to debts, moving to the fourth-tier. At the same time, the team left the 105 Stadium moving back to the old Palasport Flaminio.

Although no longer being the home venue of the Crabs, 105 Stadium sporadically hosted basketball events such as the 2011 Tassoni Trophy, an international tournament between the national teams of Italy, Greece, Poland and Bosnia and Herzegovina, or the 2012 Italian Basketball Supercup. In February 2013, Italy women's national tennis team eliminated United States in the quarterfinals of the 2013 Fed Cup.

Sporting events thus became rarer, but the arena continued to host concerts by national and international artists, as well as conferences and conventions of important companies.

In August 2017, it was announced that the naming rights to the 105 Stadium (which had until then belonged to Radio 105) had been acquired by a different Italian radio station, Radio Dimensione Suono, renaming it RDS Stadium.

In April 2021, RDS Stadium hosted the 2021 Final Eight of the domestic cup competition of Italian futsal. In February 2023, the arena was the venue of the domestic cup competition of both men's and women's Italian handball.

In April 2022, it was announced that RDS Stadium would become the first Italian federal center for dancesport. The last concert took place on December 15, 2023: it was the last event organized here under the twenty-year management by the Stadium S.r.l. company, which organized a total of 1,400 events of various kinds. Conversion work began less than a month later.

== See also ==
- List of indoor arenas in Italy
