= List of indoor arenas in Italy =

The following is a list of indoor arenas in Italy with capacity for at least 4,000 spectators. Most of the arenas in this list are multi-purpose venues, used for individual sports, team sport as well as cultural and political events.

== Currently in use ==
| Images | City | Arena | Opened | Capacity | Home team |
|---|---|---|---|---|---|
| | Ancona | Banca Marche Palace | 2005 | 6,500 | |
| | Avellino | Palasport Del Mauro | 1987 | 5,300 | Air Avellino |
| | Bari | PalaFlorio | 1991 | 6,000 | |
| | Bergamo | ChorusLife Arena | 2024 | 6,500 | |
| | Biella | Biella Forum | 2009 | 5,707 | Pallacanestro Biella |
| | Bologna | PalaDozza | 1957 | 5,721 | Fortitudo Bologna |
| | Bologna | Virtus Segafredo Arena | 2019 | 10,000 | Virtus Bologna |
| | Bologna | Unipol Arena | 1993 | 11,000 | |
| | Bolzano | Sparkasse Arena | 1993 | 7,200 | HC Bolzano |
| | Brescia | PalaLeonessa | 1967 | 5,200 | Basket Brescia Leonessa |
| | Caserta | PalaMaggio | 1982 | 6,387 | Juvecaserta Basket |
| | Catania | PalaCatania | 1995 | 5,000 | |
| | Catania | PalaNesima | 1990 | 6,000 | |
| | Civitanova Marche | PalaCivitanova | 2015 | 4,000 | Volley Lube |
| | Conegliano | Zoppas Arena | 1993 | 4,000 | |
| | Desio | PalaBanco di Desio | 1992 | 8,000 | Pallacanestro Cantù |
| | Eboli | PalaSele | 2001 | 8,000 | |
| | Florence | Nelson Mandela Forum | 1985 | 8,262 | Il Bisonte Firenze |
| | Forlì | Unieuro Arena | 1987 | 7,500 | Pallacanestro Forlì 2.015 |
| | Genoa | 105 Stadium | 2003 | 5,500 | |
| | Genoa | Palasport di Genova | 1962 | 10,000 | |
| | Livorno | Modigliani Forum | 2004 | 8,033 | Basket Livorno |
| | Milan | Agora Ice Stadium | 1987 | 4,000 | Hockey Milano Rossoblu |
| | Milan | Forum di Milano | 1990 | 15,800 | AJ Milano |
| | Milan | PalaLido | 1961 | 5,420 | Olimpia Milano |
| | Milan | PalaItalia | 2026 | 16,000 | |
| | Modena | PalaPanini | 1985 | 4,968 | Modena Volley |
| | Montichiari | PalaGeorge | 1993 | 5,500 | Brescia Leonessa |
| | Monza | Candy Arena | 2003 | 4,500 | Volley Milano, US ProVictoria Monza |
| | Naples | PalaArgento | 1963 | 8,000 | |
| | Naples | PalaEldo | 2003 | 5,500 | Napoli Basket (2016) |
| | Padua | Kioene Arena | 1980 | 4,000 | Pallavolo Padova |
| | Perugia | PalaEvangelisti | 1984 | 4,000 | Sir Safety Perugia, Wealth Planet Perugia |
| | Pesaro | Vitrifrigo Arena | 1996 | 10,323 | Scavolini Pesaro |
| | Pistoia | PalaFermi | 1988 | 4,000 | Pistoia Basket 2000 |
| | Reggio Calabria | PalaCalafiore | 1991 | 8,500 | Viola Reggio Calabria |
| | Reggio Emilia | PalaBigi | 1968 | 4,600 | Pallacanestro Reggiana |
| | Rimini | 105 Stadium | 2002 | 5,001 | Basket Rimini |
| | Rome | PalaLottomatica | 1960 | 11,200 | Virtus Roma |
| | Sassari | PalaSerradimingi | 1981 | 5,000 | Dinamo Basket Sassari |
| | Siena | Palasport Mens Sana | 1976 | 7,050 | Montepaschi Siena |
| | Turin | Oval Lingotto | 2005 | 8,500 | |
| | Turin | Inalpi Arena | 2005 | 15,657 | |
| | Turin | PalaRuffini | 1961 | 4,500 | Auxilium Pallacanestro Torino |
| | Turin | Palavela | 1961 | 9,200 | |
| | Trento | BLM Group Arena | 2000 | 4,360 | Trentino Volley |
| | Treviso | Palaverde | 1983 | 6,000 | Benetton Basket Bwin, Sisley Volley |
| | Trieste | Allianz Dome | 1999 | 6,943 | Alma Pallacanestro Trieste |
| | Varese | PalA2A | 1964 | 5,300 | Pallacanestro Varese |
| | Verona | PalaOlimpia | 1986 | 5,350 | Scaligera Verona |
| | Vigevano | Vigevano Arena | 2010 | 7,000 | Nuova Pallacanestro Vigevano 1955 |

== Proposed arenas ==
| Arena | Capacity | Ground breaking | Opening | Location |
|---|---|---|---|---|
| WeArena | 10,500 | TBD | TBD | Reggio Emilia |
| Bosco dello Sport | 10,000 | 2024 | 2026 | Venice |

== See also ==
- List of football stadiums in Italy
- List of indoor arenas in Europe
- List of indoor arenas by capacity
- Lists of stadiums
