= Roberto Gabini =

Argentine-Italian basketball player

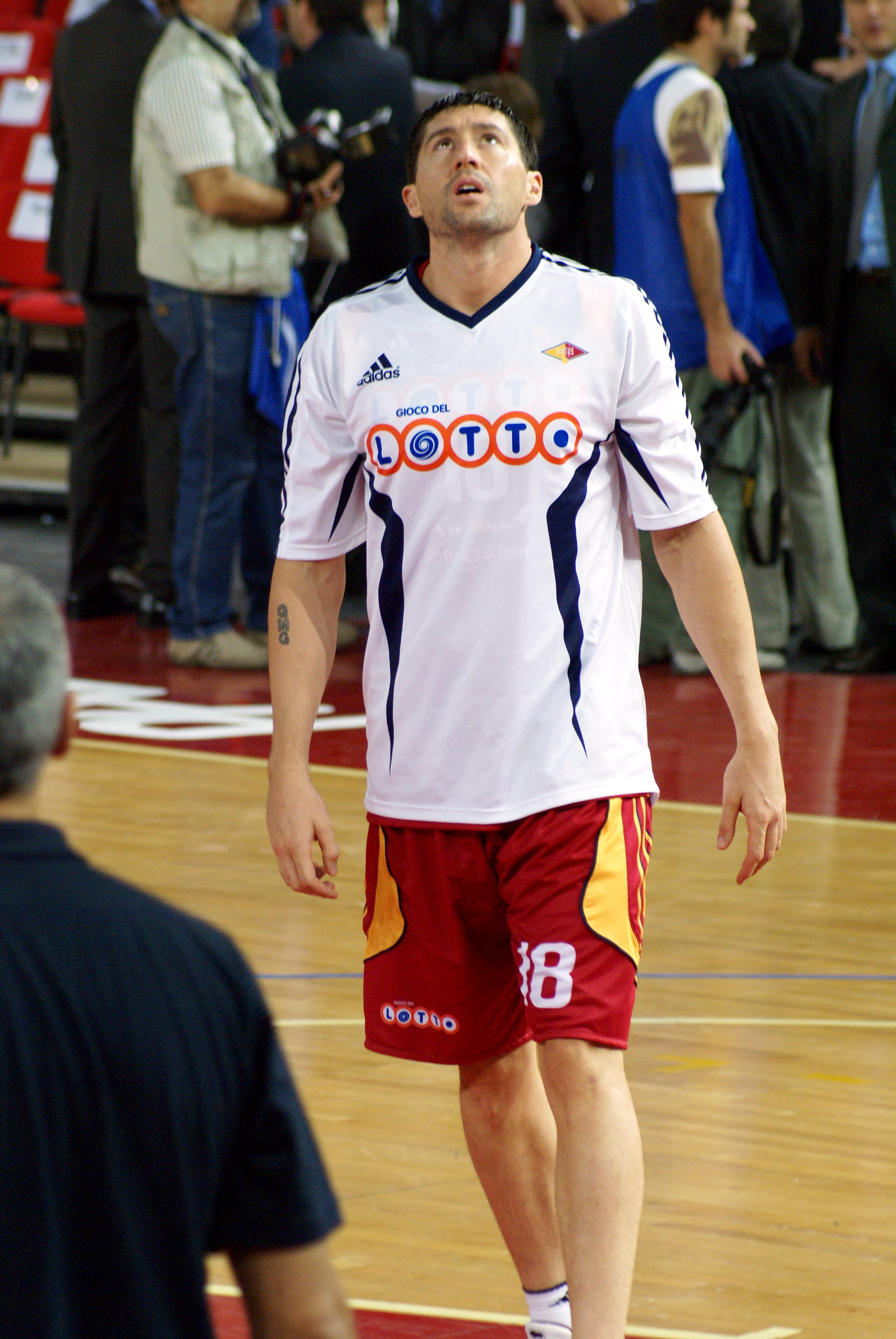
- Roberto Gabini

Personal information
- Born: June 10, 1975 (age 51) Buenos Aires, Argentina
- Listed height: 1.98 m (6 ft 6 in)
- Listed weight: 98 kg (216 lb)

Career information
- NBA draft: 1997: undrafted
- Playing career: 1994–2017
- Position: Small forward / power forward
- Number: 9

Career history
- 1994–1996: Belgrano de San Nicolás
- 1996–1998: Regatas San Nicolás
- 1998–2000: Obras Sanitarias
- 2000–2001: Atenas de Córdoba
- 2001–2002: Regatas San Nicolás
- 2002–2003: Boca Juniors
- 2003–2004: Rimini Crabs
- 2004–2005: Saski Baskonia
- 2005–2007: Granada
- 2007–2009: Virtus Roma
- 2009: NSB Napoli
- 2010: Aurora Jesi
- 2010–2011: Atenas de Córdoba
- 2011: Libertad de Sunchales
- 2011–2013: Gimnasia de Comodoro
- 2013–2017: Belgrano de San Nicolás

Roberto Gabini (born June 10, 1975) is an Argentine-Italian former professional basketball player. He played for three seasons with Virtus Roma (2007-2009).

At 198 cm, he plays the small forward and power forward positions. He was born in Buenos Aires, Argentina.

== Career ==
Gabini grew up playing with Regatas San Nicolas (Juniors) in Argentina, before making his debut with Regatas San Nicolas during the 1996-97 season, and played the 1997-98 championship with the club. Thereafter he played for Obras Sanitarias Buenos Aires, Atenas Cordoba and Boca Juniors before moving to Europe, starting with Tau Ceramica, CB Granada in Spain, Basket Rimini Crabs, Italy and Virtus Roma (2007-2009).
