= Guangzhou Circle =

- 广州圆大厦
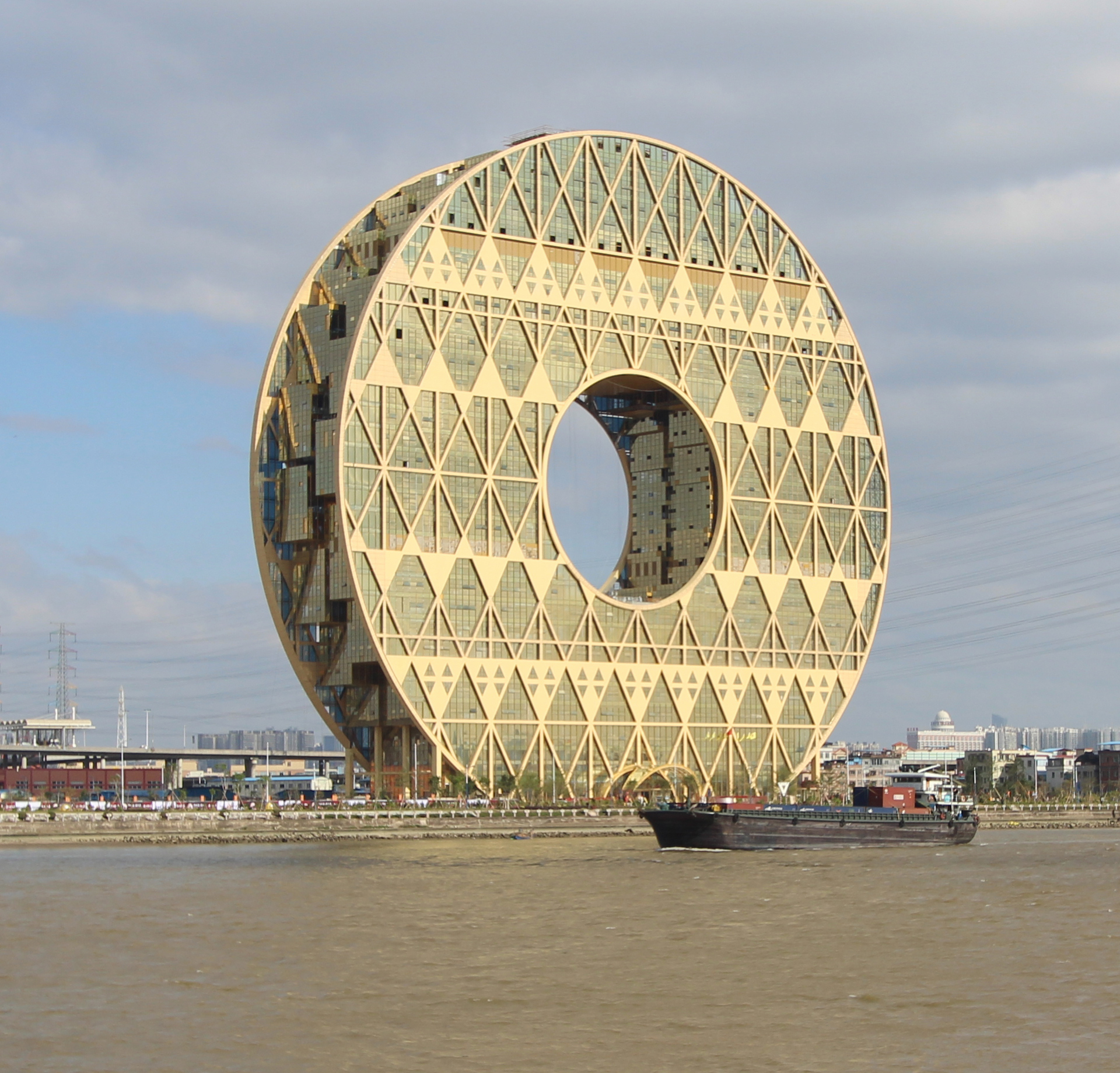
- Interactive map of the Guangzhou Circle area

General information
- Type: Commercial offices
- Location: Liwan District, Guangzhou, Guangdong, China
- Coordinates: 23°03′09″N 113°15′13″E
- Construction started: 2013
- Topped-out: 2013
- Owner: Hongda Xingye Group

Height
- Roof: 138 m (453 ft)

Technical details
- Floor count: 33
- Floor area: 85,000 m^{2} (910,000 sq ft)

Design and construction
- Architect: Joseph di Pasquale

References
- AM Project

Guangzhou Circle (Chinese: 广州圆大厦) is a landmark building located in Guangzhou, Guangdong province, China. It is the headquarters of the Hongda Xingye Group and the Guangdong Plastic Exchange (GDPE), the world's largest trading centre for raw plastic material with more than €25 billion annual turnover in 2012.

== Architect ==
The building was designed by Italian architect Joseph di Pasquale. The building's height is 138 m (453 ft), and features 33 stories. The building has a total area of 85,000 m^{2} (910,000 sq ft), and was developed with a global investment of roughly 1 billion RMB (US$150 million).

Di Pasquale stated he was looking for a design based on Oriental psychology and perception, and used the Chinese use of logographic symbols (sinograms) in writing as inspiration.

Many other meanings are linked with the building: the iconic value of jade discs and numerological tradition of Fengshui. In particular, the double disc of jade (bi-disk) is an ancient royal symbol of a Chinese dynasty which ruled in this area around 2000 years ago. The building reflection in the water of the river creates the same type of image: a double jade bi-disc. This figure also corresponds to the number 8 and the infinity symbol, which has a strong propitiatory value in Chinese culture.

The building also takes a reference from an idea of the Italian Renaissance; "quadratura del cerchio" (squaring the circle). The two circular facades contain and support suspended groups of storeys, which "square" the circumference of the facades in order to make the interior space orthogonal and habitable.

== Location ==
Located at the south west boundary of the city, the building stands on the bank of the Pearl River.

== Design ==
The building is similar to another circular building in Shenyang, although, unlike the other, the central core is open, with no glass. It is the world's tallest circular building, and has the unique feature of an empty circular core almost 59 m (194 ft) in diameter.

The public areas of the building are not yet open, although the public plaza and the dark fountain in front is open.

In 2014, CNN listed the building as one of the 10 most interesting buildings worldwide.

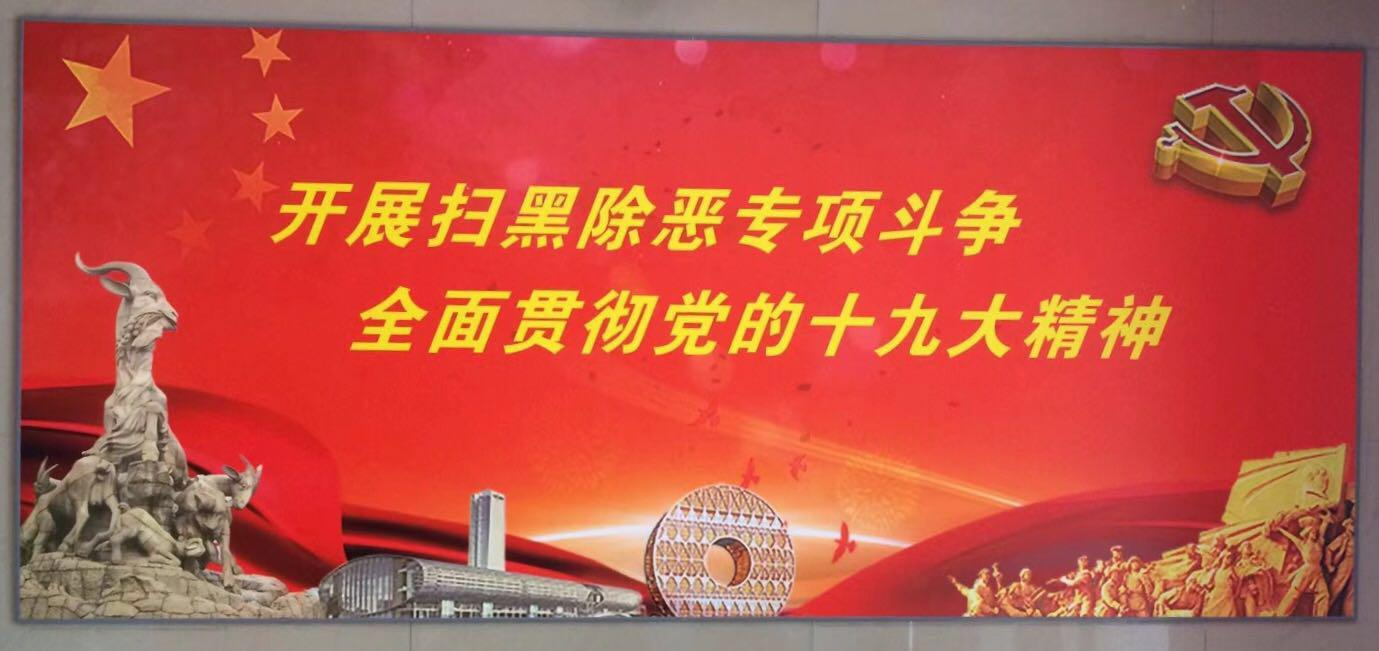
The Guangzhou Circle (bottom center) used as a symbol of the city for the poster of the nineteenth congress of the Communist Party of the city of Guangzhou on October 19, 2017.

Some critics believe that Guangzhou Circle is one of the most bizarre buildings in China.

In the years following its construction, the Guangzhou Circle was identified as one of the most iconic buildings of the city of Guangzhou. Its image has been used on various occasions for information posters in public places and for advertising campaigns.

== See also ==
- List of tallest buildings in Guangzhou
