= Albert Miralles =

Spanish basketball player

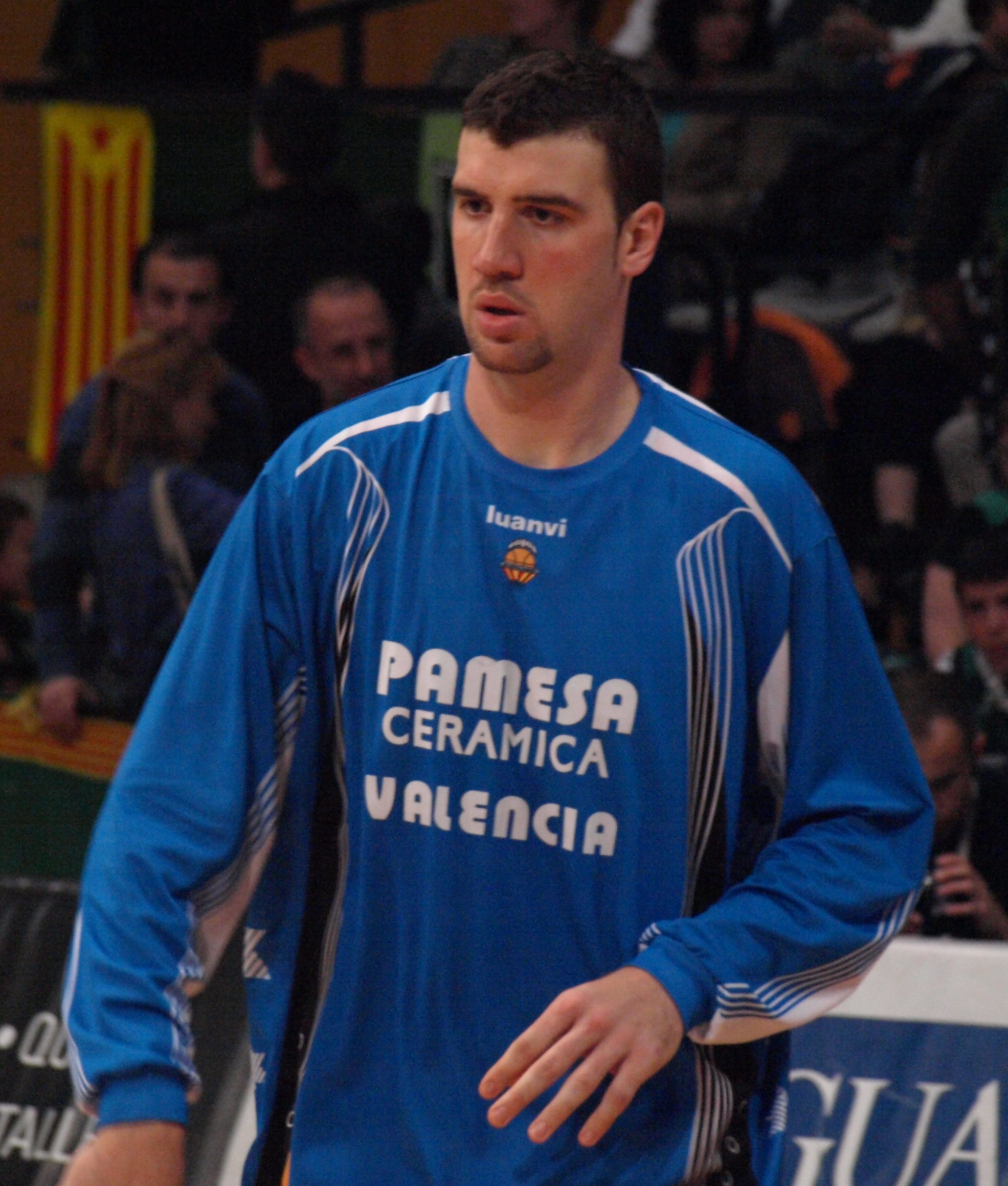
- Miralles in a warm-up with Pamesa Valencia (2009)

Personal information
- Born: 14 May 1982 (age 44) Badalona, Spain
- Listed height: 2.08 m (6 ft 10 in)
- Listed weight: 110 kg (243 lb)

Career information
- NBA draft: 2004: 2nd round, 39th overall pick
- Drafted by: Toronto Raptors
- Playing career: 1999–2016
- Position: Center

Career history
- 1999–2001: Joventut Badalona
- 2000–2001: →Inca
- 2001–2002: Club Ourense Baloncesto
- 2002: Virtus Bologna
- 2002–2003: →Basket Rimini Crabs
- 2003–2004: Roseto Basket
- 2004–2005: Pallacanestro Cantù
- 2005–2009: Valencia
- 2009–2011: Gipuzkoa
- 2011–2012: Pallacanestro Biella
- 2012–2013: Alba Berlin
- 2013–2016: Joventut Badalona
- Stats at Basketball Reference

Albert Miralles (born 14 May 1982) is a Spanish former professional basketball player.

== Professional career ==
=== NBA draft ===
Miralles was drafted by the Toronto Raptors in the 2004 NBA draft. The Miami Heat then acquired his rights from the Raptors in exchange for the draft rights of Pape Sow and the Heat's 2005 second-round pick. In 2005, Miralles was acquired by the Boston Celtics in the Antoine Walker trade. In 2011, he was traded to the Milwaukee Bucks for Keyon Dooling and a second-round pick. In July 2016, the Cleveland Cavaliers acquired Miralles' rights in exchange for Matthew Dellavedova and cash considerations. The Cavaliers then traded his rights to the Chicago Bulls in exchange for Mike Dunleavy Jr. and the rights to Vladimir Veremeenko.

=== Club career ===
Miralles played professionally in Spain for Pamesa Valencia (2005–09) and Lagun Aro GBC (2009–11), and in Italy for Virtus Bologna (2002), Basket Rimini Crabs (2002–03), Euro Roseto (2003–04), Vertical Vision Cantu (2004–05) and Angelico Biella (2011–12).

On 31 August 2012, Miralles signed with German Euroleague club Alba Berlin. One year later, he signed a two-year deal with his origin club, Joventut Badalona. In July 2015, he re-signed with Joventut for two more years.

=== Spain national team ===
Miralles won a silver medal with the U-20 Spanish national team in the 2002 FIBA Europe Under-20 Championship. He also played five games with the Spanish senior team.
