= Luciano Capicchioni =

Sammarinese-American sports agent (1946–2021)

Luciano Capicchioni (14 July 1946 – 2 March 2021) was a Sammarinese-American sports agent. He was known by the nickname "Lucky".

== Biography ==
As a teenager, Capicchioni moved to the United States with his father and two sisters. In 1965, he founded the cycling team at Michigan State University. He received a BA from Michigan State and a doctorate from the University of Bologna.Upon his return to Europe, he founded the San Marino Basketball Federation. In 1969, he founded the Federazione Sammarinese Baseball-Softball, of which he was the President until 1972. From 1979 to 1984, he served as Vice-President of the Sammarinese National Olympic Committee, a position in which he oversaw the Olympic Games in Los Angeles and Moscow. In 1980, he was the San Marino Olympic Delegation in Moscow.

In 1986, Capicchioni founded the agency Interperformances, which represented professional athletes worldwide, including Toni Kukoč, Predrag Danilović, Arvydas Sabonis, Peja Stojaković, Zydrunas Ilgauskas, and Manu Ginóbili. His main American partner in representing players in the NBA was Herb Rudoy. He also represented soccer, American football, volleyball, and baseball players. His son, Manuel, joined the company in 1998.

In 2002, Capicchioni became owner of the basketball club Basket Rimini Crabs of the Italian Legadue Basket. He left the team in 2006 but made a significant monetary contribution in March 2010, allowing the financially-troubled club to compete for the remainder of the season. Throughout the next few years, he helped to remedy the club's financial struggles, which resulted in its survival. In 2018, he restructured the club maintaining only the youth team, but then sold it entirely to Rinascita Basket Rimini.

Luciano Capicchioni died on 2 March 2021 in San Marino at the age of 74.
