= ChorusLife =

District in Milan, Italy

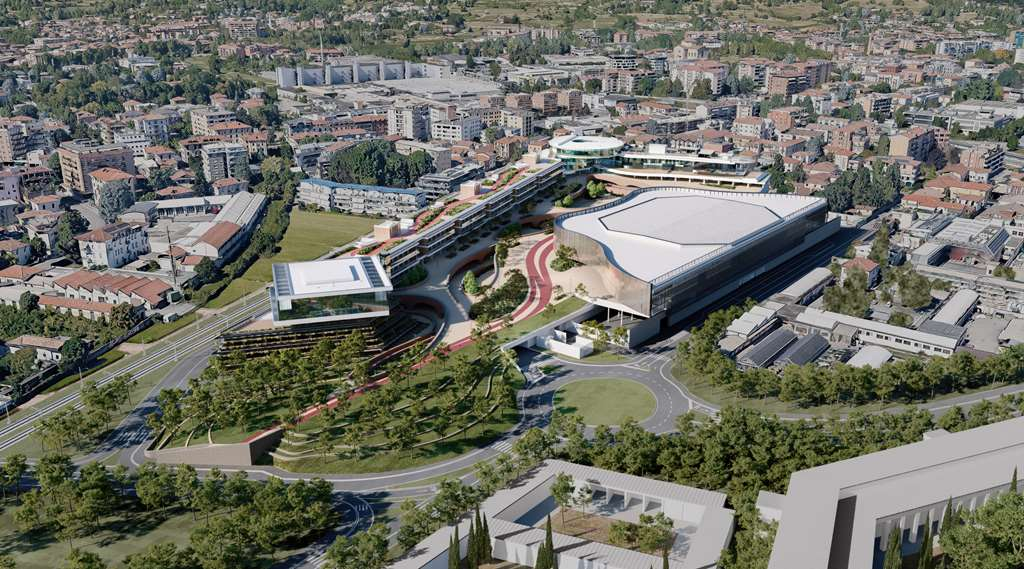
- Aerial view of Choruslife
- Interactive map of ChorusLife
- Location: Bergamo, Italy
- Coordinates: 45°42′12″N 9°41′24″E
- Status: Completed

Companies
- Architect: Joseph di Pasquale
- Contractor: Polifin

ChorusLife is a smart district in the city of Bergamo designed by the architect Joseph di Pasquale and inaugurated on November 21, 2024.

== History ==
It was promoted by the "cavaliere del lavoro" Domenico Bosatelli and it is an urban regeneration model that has converted the dismissed industrial area of Ex Ote factory into a neighborhood center with a system of public squares, a covered arena, residential, hospitality and recreational activities.

After the signing of a letter of intent in 2015, on 21 December 2016 the memorandum of understanding was signed between the Municipality of Bergamo, the Province of Bergamo, Grupedil and TEB spa (public transport) In 2018, the program agreement was signed between the Lombardy Region, the Municipality of Bergamo and Grupedil and TEB for the implementation of the project.

In 2019, the building permit was granted and the reclamation and construction works began.

On November 21, 2024, ChorusLife will be inaugurated and handed over to the city.

== Description ==
ChorusLife occupies an area of about 40,000 square meters, the result of an urban transformation process that affected a sector of about 130,000 square meters.

=== The commercial squares ===
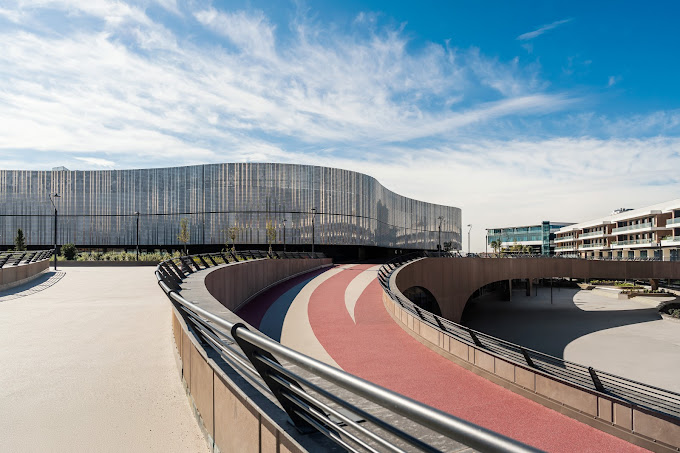
The ChorusLife Arena within the ChorusLife plaza system

They are the center of the project and intend to give back an idea of public space as a fully pedestrian urban experience.
