= Futsal in Italy =

Futsal has been played in Italy on an organised basis since 1987.

== Background ==
The Associazione Italiana Football Sala (Italian Futsal Association / AIFS) was founded in 1987, and renamed the Federazione Italiana Football Sala (Italian Futsal Federation / FIFS) in 1988. . It was immediately recognized by FIFUSA (the international governing body of futsal, known by the Portuguese acronym Federação Internacional de Futebol de Salão). In 1988 it was among the founders of the European Union of Futsal (UEFS), the governing body in Europe. In 1991 it organized the World Championships in Milan. In the five years From 1992 to 1996, it organized the Mickey Mouse Trophy, sponsored by the Walt Disney. In 1992 it took part in the European Championship held in Porto (Portugal) by the Spanish UEFS. In 1994 he took part for the last time in World Cup organized by the FIFUSA. The Italy national team finished in last place. FIFS sent the teams who won national championships to participate in the Champions League Cup. In 1991 AS Milan finished seventh, as did GS Danypel Milan in 1992 and 1993. In 1995 the Sporting Turro was placed eight. Giovanni Caminiti, the President of the FIFS ceased its work at the end of the 1990s due to ill health, and the organisation was dormant until the summer of 2009 when Axel Paderni revived its activities.

In 2009 it joined the International Futsal World League Association, founded in Switzerland to preserve and promote Futsal globally. Now 15 national futsal organisations are member of the association: Bolivia, Brazil, Ecuador, Egypt, El Salvador, France, Germany, Italy, Morocco, Nigeria, Peru, Monaco, Seborga, Switzerland, Tunisia. The association organizes international friendly matches for national teams and clubs, the Mediterranean Cup (for men and for disabled athletes) and Mundialito Cup.

== National team ==
See also Italy national futsal team

== Clubs ==
See Category:Futsal clubs in Italy and Serie A (futsal)

== See also ==
- Federazione Italiana Football Sala
- Italy national futsal team
- Serie A (futsal)
- 2003 UEFA Futsal Championship
