= Joseph di Pasquale =

Italian architect

Joseph Di Pasquale
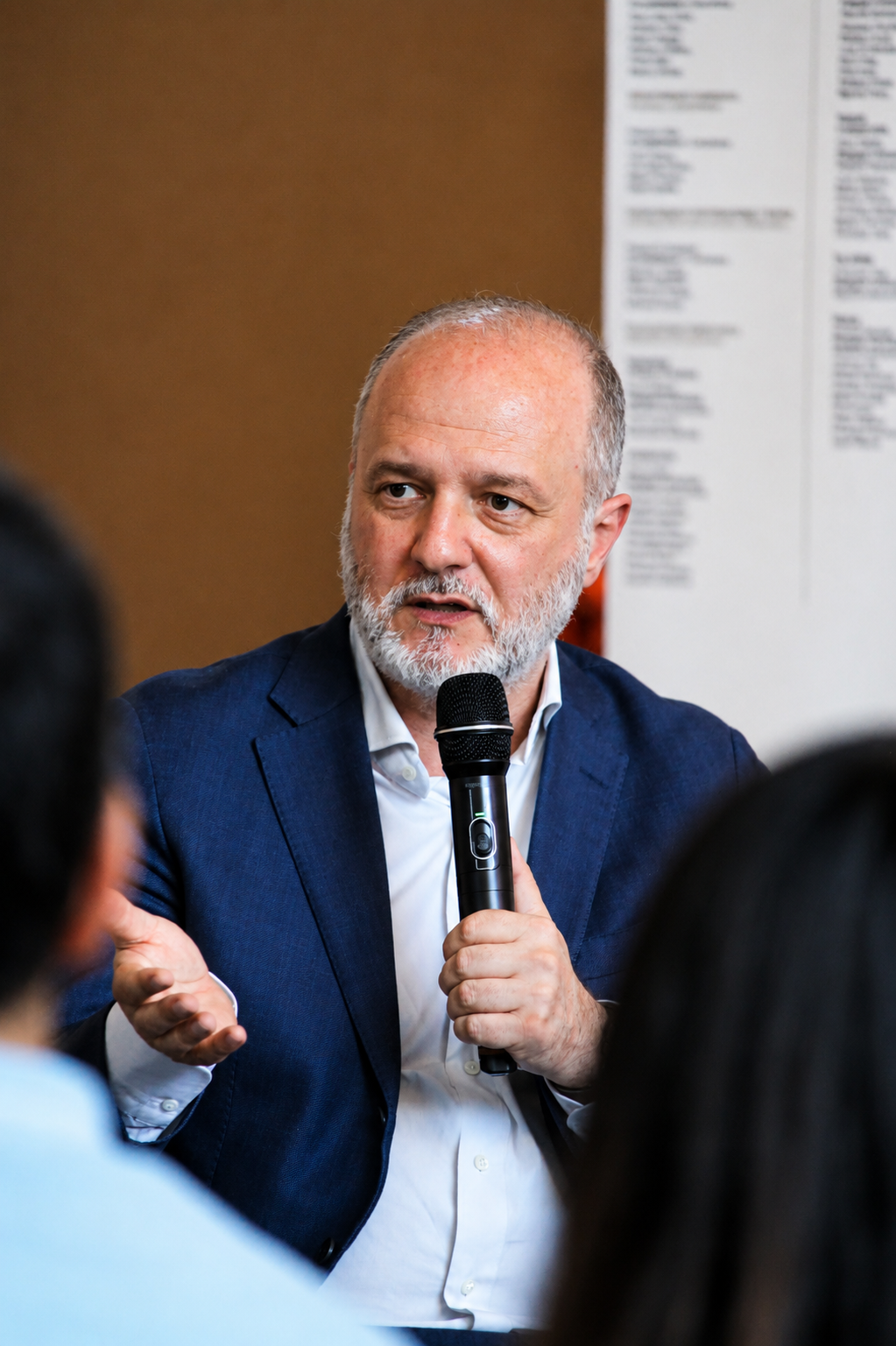
- Born: 24 April 1968 (age 58); Como, Italy
- Education: Politecnico di Milano
- Occupation: Architect

Joseph Di Pasquale is an Italian architect.

== Biographical notes ==
Graduated with honors in architecture at Politecnico di Milano in 1991. Honorary degree in Social and Political Science, ISFOA University, Zurich 2024. In 2019 he got a "cum laude" PhD at Politecnico di Milano with the thesis: "Hybrid Modular Architecture: a strategic framework of building innovation for emerging housing behaviors in urban contexts".

Since 2009 contract professor at the Faculty of Architecture at Politecnico di Milano.

In 2001 he studied Film Directing in New York Film Academy. He started his professional practice JDP Architects since 1992 and operates in Europe and China.

== Career ==
Di Pasquale claims a lack of identity in contemporary globalized architecture, considers himself an architectural storyteller and a seeker of new interpretations for the contemporary city. In the book "Dense City" he identifies a structural relationship between urban density and cultural identity in urban fabric and architecture.

He states "the contemporary city is no longer able to generate significant urban space because the modern architecture has abandoned the idea of "facade", which means the idea to orient the buildings, therefore the city no longer looks toward its space, but it's made by architectures that are meant to be looked upon as single sculptures or objects". Since 2008, he has produced several works on cultural dissemination with lectures and conferences in Italy, China, Russia and the United States. He has been an observer of the historical meeting between Chinese tradition and the western contemporary society in the early 21st century. In 2013, he declared to the Il Sole 24 Ore that contemporary Chinese society and architecture are "seeking the contemporary transposition of its millenary tradition". Di Pasquale is the author of many articles in "L'Arca International" magazine In his academic research he defines and investigates hybrid modular systems and concepts in terms of process innovation linked with the ongoing deep changes of lifestyles and housing habits in contemporaneity.

In the further development of experimental research on the innovation of residential typologies in urban contexts, Joseph di Pasquale defines the concept of adaptive housing which inverts the relationship between user needs and the size of the accommodation: instead of the users adapting to the dimensions of the home, it is the home that expands and shrinks according to the evolving needs of individuals and families over time.

In 2023 he designed the first adaptive housing building and founded a development company for its construction in Milan, financing the operation through crowdfunding.

He has been appointed by the Italian Ministry of Foreign Affairs as the Ambassador of Italian Design Day 2024 and in that capacity gives numerous lectio magistralis at Italian Consulate in Guangzhou, at South China University of Technology in Guangzhou and Shenzhen in China.

In 2024 he published the book Esseri Urbani, la città relazionale e i nuovi paradigmi dell’abitare (Urban Beings, the Relational City and the New Paradigms of Housing) in which he theorized the concept of the “relational city,” according to which the physical city in history is nothing more than the materialization of the relational geometry of humankind in its historical evolution. Intervention on the city can no longer be done according to a modeling approach but based on the concept of relational density, through which to intercept and interpret the housing desire of individuals and communities taken as a "relational good" underlying urban quality. From this perspective, urban and housing policies are thus configured as adaptive strategies that are structurally open to evolving behaviors and relational densification.

== Competitions and projects ==
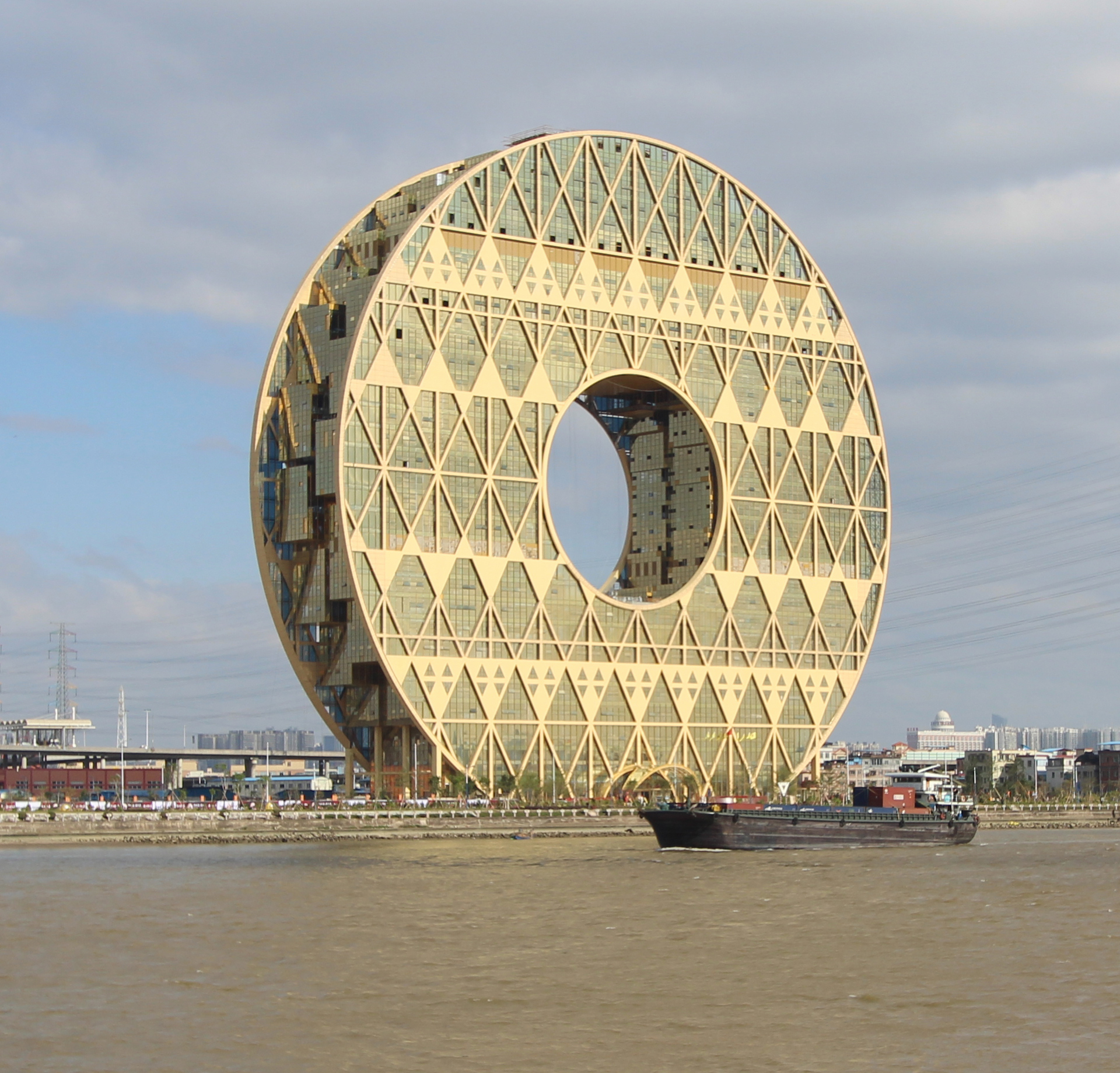
Guangzhou Circle

He won several national and international competitions of architecture, among which the Tianjin Eco Town and the Guangzhou Circle, opened in 2013, that CNN listed in the 10 most interesting buildings that will appear in 2014 worldwide. Other relevant projects are Gewiss production plant, Intercos, Polini, Valsir, Aerea headquarter, amusement park of Minitalia Leolandia in Turate (Italy).

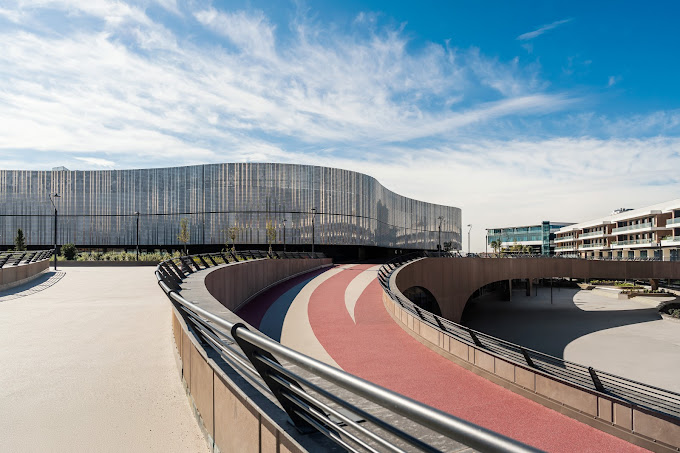
ChorusLife's squares

In 2024, the ChorusLife smart district will be inaugurated in Bergamo, fully design by Joseph Di Pasquale, an urban regeneration model of international importance on a 130,000 m2 area that has converted a large dismissed urban area into a neighborhood hub with a system of public squares, an indoor arena, housing, retail, hospitality and recreational activities.

== Publications ==
- 2008. Emergenza/tessuto, appunti per una metodologia della composizione architettonica.
- 2010. La città densa. Identità urbana e densità edilizia.
- 2014. City manifesto. Buildings, architecture and urban design works at AM Project Milan.
- 2014. Pop-up hotel Expo 2015. Temporaneità come condizione permanente.
- 2015. Lost in Globalization. The paradigm of Chinese urban housing.
- 2015. Scalable Modular Architecture. A dynamic Housing for a changing society.
- 2017. Typological and Technological innovation for the application of hybrid systems to housing construction. In: TECHNE vol.13.
- 2024. Esseri Urbani, la città relazionale e i nuovi paradigmi dell’abitare, Edizioni Il Poligrafo.

== Awards ==
- WGDO World Green Design Contribution Award 2015 for Guangzhou Circle Building.
- WT Smart City Award 2017 given by Città Metropolitana di Milano for Chorus Life.
- ICONIC LANDSCAPE AWARD 2018 for design of CHORUSLIFE HOTEL, released by international forum Eco Green Tech, Topscape and Paysage magazines.
- GRI Award 2024 won by COSTIM for the Chorus Life project designed by Joseph Di Pasquale in the “real estate destination” category.
