= Rinascita Basket Rimini =

- Leagues: Serie A2
- Founded: 1947
- Arena: Palasport Flaminio (1977–2003, 2011–present); 105 Stadium (2003–2011)
- Location: Rimini, Italy
- Team colors: White and Red
- President: (Italy) Paolo Maggioli
- Head coach: (Italy) Sandro Dell'Agnello
- Website: rinascitabasketrimini.it
Home	Away

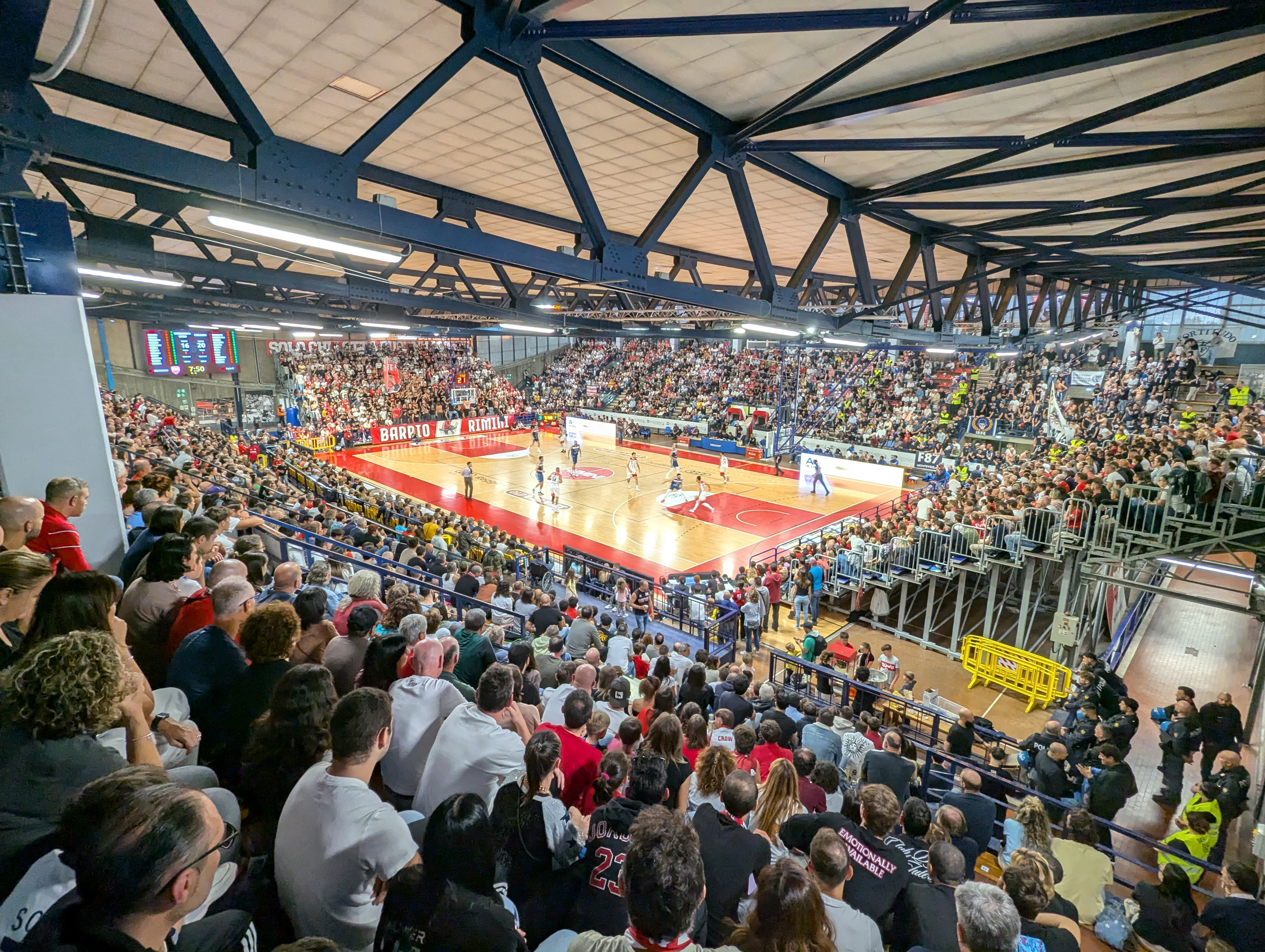
Palasport Flaminio, the home venue of the team.

Rinascita Basket Rimini (RBR), formerly known as Basket Rimini and Basket Rimini Crabs, is an Italian basketball team based in Rimini, Emilia-Romagna.

From the 1978–79 to the 2010–11 season, the team continuously played in professional basketball between Serie A1 and Serie A2/Legadue, with one exception, the 1990–91 season (played in Serie B1).

== History ==
The team was officially established in 1947. As Polisportiva Libertas, they spent their first decades in the regional leagues. In 1972, the team was promoted for the first time to Serie B, the second highest league in Italy at the time. It was also renamed Basket Rimini.

In 1974, Alberto Bucci was appointed as the new head coach. During his five-year stint, he led the team from Serie D to its first historic Serie A2 participation in the 1978–79 season, which also brought the first American basketball players to Rimini.

On April 8, 1984, the team was promoted to Serie A1, the top tier of the Italian league system, where it played for the next three years, reaching the quarter-finals in 1985. After three years in Serie A2, the team was relegated to Serie B, but a double promotion brought them back to Serie A1 in just two years. Part of that roster featured young players who won the national junior title in 1989, including Carlton Myers, who would later be Italy's flag-bearer at the opening ceremony of the 2000 Sydney Olympics.

In 1993, Basket Rimini was relegated again to Serie A2. It came close to returning to A1 three times before finally achieving this at the end of the 1996–97 season. Basket Rimini advanced to the Serie A1 quarter-finals in both the 1997–98 and 1998–99 seasons, qualifying for the following year's FIBA Korać Cup. With a last-place finish in the 2000–01 Serie A1, the club fell into Legadue, the new name for Serie A2. Simultaneously, Basket Rimini was renamed Basket Rimini Crabs.

The team competed in the Legadue league from the 2001–02 season to the 2010–11 season, coming close to securing promotion to Serie A in 2006–07 but ultimately falling short.

In 2011, the Crabs were unable to participate in the upcoming Legadue due to debts and instead found a place in the fourth division (DNB) with the intervention of Luciano Capicchioni, who had previously owned the team. At the end of the 2017–18 season, which concluded with the relegation of the first team to Serie C, Capicchioni decided to focus solely on the activities of the youth teams.

This decision was also influenced by a protest staged by a segment of the Rimini public in February 2018 against the Crabs' management, which was criticized for lacking a long-term plan and for causing local fans to lose interest in the city’s team. As a result, a new organization named Rinascita Basket Rimini (RBR) was established in the summer as a counter to the Crabs, who, as previously mentioned, ended their first team’s operations. The new team started its journey from Serie C, achieving promotion to Serie B on its first attempt. In May 2020, the club acquired the historic sports title of the Crabs, effectively incorporating the historic Basket Rimini organization as well. In the 2021–22 season, Rimini clinched promotion to Serie A2, ending a 10-year absence from the second tier.

== Notable players ==
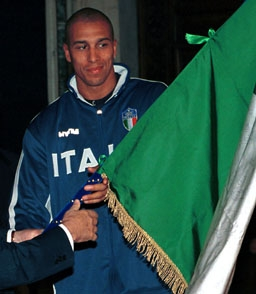
Carlton Myers

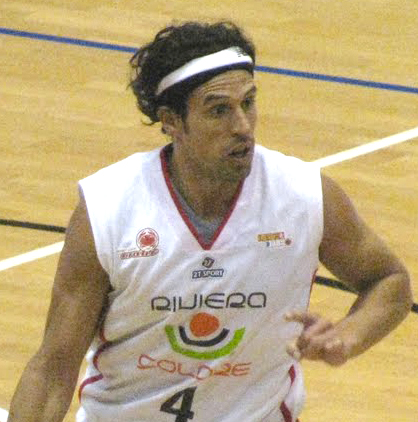
Germán Scarone

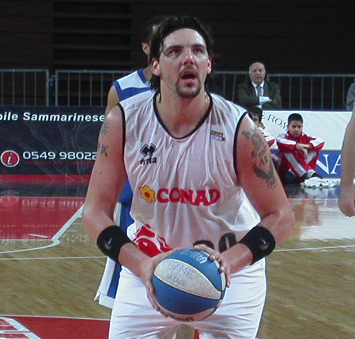
Román González

- (United States) Mark Crow 1 season: '78-'79
- (United States) Otis Howard 2 seasons: '78-'80
- (United States) Reggie Johnson 2 seasons: '84-'86
- (United States) (Haiti) Olden Polynice 1 season: '86-'87
- (United States) (Italy) Mike Sylvester 1 season: '86-'87
- (United States) Mark Smith 3 seasons: '87-'90
- (United States) Andre Goode 2 seasons: '87-'89
- (Socialist Federal Republic of Yugoslavia) Rajko Žižić 1 season: '87-'88
- (Italy) Massimo Ruggeri 8 seasons: '89-'95, '98-'99, '01-'02
- (Italy) Carlton Myers 6 seasons: '88-'92, '94-'95, '09-'10
- (Brazil) Andrade Israel 3 seasons: '91-'94
- (United States) Darnell Valentine 1 season: '91-'92
- (United States) Frank Johnson 1 season: '91-'92
- (United States) (Italy) Larry Middleton 2 seasons: '92-'94
- (Italy) Alex Righetti 7 seasons: '93-'00
- (United States) Emanual Davis 1 season: '94-'95
- (Argentina) (Italy) Germán Scarone 10 seasons: '95-'98, '05-'11, '13-'14
- (United States) John Fox 1 season: '95-'96
- (United States) Doug Lee 1 season: '95-'96
- (United States) Joe Wylie 2 seasons: '96-'98
- (Slovenia) Boris Gorenc 2 seasons: '97-'99
- (United States) Anthony Tucker 1 season: '97-'98
- (Slovenia) Marko Tušek 2 seasons: '98-'00
- (United States) Antonio Granger 2 seasons: '98-'00
- (United States) (Republic of Ireland) Alan Tomidy 2 seasons: '98-'00
- (United States) (Italy) Chris Corchiani 1 season: '99-'00
- (United States) (Republic of Ireland) Glenn Sekunda 2 seasons: '99-'01
- (United States) Eric Washington 2 seasons: '00-'02
- (United States) Rodney Buford 1 season: '00-'01
- (United States) Marques Bragg 1 season: '01-'02
- (United States) Ed Stokes 1 season: '01-'02
- (Brazil) Marcelo Machado 1 season: '02-'03
- (Brazil) (Italy) Guilherme Giovannoni 1 season: '02-'03
- (Spain) Albert Miralles 1 season: '02-'03
- (Argentina) (Italy) Roberto Gabini 1 season: '03-'04
- (United States) Rodney Monroe 2 seasons: '03-'05
- (Argentina) (Italy) Román González 2 seasons: '03-'05
- (United States) Chandler Thompson 1 season: '04-'05
- (United States) Terrence Rencher 1 season: '04-'05
- (Argentina) (Italy) Demián Filloy 4 seasons: '04-'07, '10-'11
- (United States) Trent Whiting 1 season: '05-'06
- (United States) Tim Pickett 2 seasons: '05-'07
- (United States) Omar Thomas 2 seasons: '06-'08
- (Nigeria) Ndudi Ebi 1 season: '09-'10
- (Italy) Andrea Pecile 1 season: '09-'10
- (Serbia) Dušan Vukčević 1 season: '10-'11

== Sponsorship names ==
Crabs logo

Over the years, due to sponsorship, the club has been known as:

- As Basket Rimini:
  - Sarila (1972–1980)
  - Sacramora (1980–1983)
  - Marr (1983–1986)
  - Hamby (1986–1987)
  - Biklim (1987–1988)
  - Marr (1988–1993)
  - Olio Monini (1993–1994)
  - Teamsystem (1994–1995)
  - Koncret (1995–1997)
  - Pepsi (1997–2000)
  - Vip (2000–2001)
- As Basket Rimini Crabs:
  - Conad (2001–2002)
  - Vip (2002–2003)
  - Conad (2003–2005)
  - Coopsette (2005–2009)
  - Riviera Solare (2009–2010)
  - Edilizia Moderna (2010)
  - Immobiliare Spiga (2010–2011)
  - NTS Informatica (2015–2018)
- As Rinascita Basket Rimini:
  - Albergatore Pro (2019–2020)
  - RivieraBanca (2020–2025)
  - Dole (2025–...)
