= PalaNesima =

Indoor sporting arena in Catania, Italy

- Interactive map of PalaNesima
- Location: Catania, Italy
- Coordinates: 37.517822°N 15.043516°E
- Capacity: 6,000

Construction
- Opened: 1990

PalaNesima is an indoor sporting arena located in Catania, Italy. The capacity of the arena is 6,000 spectators.

It was planned to be used for the 1997 Summer Universiade.
