= Federazione Italiana Football Sala =

Futsal administrating sports entity in Italy

The Italian Football Sala Federation (acronym of FIFS} is the Italian sports federation that promotes nationally the Football Sala, indoor soccer or futsal (Spanish: fútbol de salón or microfutbol), played with the Rules of the Asociación Mundial de Futsal (AMF). It organizes national, international and friendly tournaments for national and club teams / representatives, amateur events and competitions for the disabled. He also organized the Topolino Trophy five times (from 1992 to 1996), in collaboration with The Walt Disney Company Italia, as well as the Mediterranean Cup (male and disabled) and the Mundialito Cup. It is based in Milan and the current President is Axel Paderni, in office since July 2009. It is the only Italian sports federation recognized by the Asociación Mundial de Futsal (AMF) and, therefore, the only one authorized to use international trademarks and logos.

== History of the Federation ==
The Associazione Italiana Football Sala (AIFS) was founded in 1987 by a group of shareholders led by Giovanni Conticini. Following the recognition by the European Popular Movement, in 1988 the new president Giovanni Caminiti changed the name to Federazione Italiana Football Sala. It was immediately recognized by the international futsal governing body Federação Internacional de Futebol de Salão (FIFUSA). It was among the founders of the Union Europea de Futsal (UEFS).

In 1991, the Federation got even to organize the World Championship in Milan and in 1992 it took part in the European Championship held in Porto (Portugal) from the old Spanish UEFS. In 1994, it took part for the last time in a World Cup organized by FIFUSA, but the result was disappointing because the Italian national team ranked in last place.

It organized 5 times (from 1992 to 1996), in collaboration with The Walt Disney Company Italy, the Trofeo Topolino (Mickey Mouse’s Trophy), besides Mediterranean Cup (male and disabled) and the Mundialito Cup.

Concerning the clubs’ competitions, from 1988 to 1998 FIFS sent the teams who won the national championship to participate in the Champions League Cup: in the 1991's edition the AS Milan ranked seventh, in 1992 and 1993 the same placement was reached by GS Danypel Milan, while in 1995 Sporting Turro finished the tournament in the eighth place.

At the end of the 1990s, due to President Caminiti's serious health problems, the Federation stopped its agonistic activity and remained dormant until the summer of 2009 when, with the advent of Axel Paderni, its activities started again.

In 2009, it joined the International Futsal World League Association, created in Switzerland with the goal to preserve and promote in the world futsal, working to make more and more athletes play it. It was composed by 15 countries: Bolivia, Brazil, Ecuador, Egypt, El Salvador, France, Germany, Italy, Morocco, Nigeria, Peru, Monaco, Seborga, Switzerland, Tunisia. The history of this association lasted only three years: in September 2012, after the European Mediterranean Cup's carrying out in Imperia, its dissolution was decreed.

In July 2012, after the AMF's World Ordinary Congress in Asunción (Paraguay), FIFS received an invitation from Asociación Mundial de Futsal to take part to the world scene: in October 2012, in fact, its entry is ratified.

In November 2013 after 19 years of absence, it participates in the World Female Championship AMF in Barrancabermeja in Colombia, reaching the 12th position and the victory of the Fair Play Cup.

From September 29 to October 3, 2014, it has been engaged in the European UEFS Qualification in LLoret de Mar to participate in the World Championship AMF in April 2015 in Belarus where it has not reached to the National Italian Football Hall Major qualification finishing in 4th place.

The Italian National Under20 participated in October 2014 to the AMF World Cup in Chile finishing the event on the 10th place and, after 20 years of absence from European competitions Officers, it participated in December 2015 at the European Championship for National U21 in Lloret de Mar in Spain finishing at 5th place.

The National Italian Male after 21 years of absence earns a memorable Second place in the European Championship UEFS which was played in Russia in Moscow on May 23 to 28 2016.

== Events in Italy ==
Each year the Federation organizes the Italian Championship for men's club teams and, at the same time, the "Coppa Italia" (Italian Cup). After the regional phases - that take place between April and May -, the winners of each group will meet in June to stake the trophy in a place that changes every year (in 2012 it took place in Agrate Brianza). The winners of the two events will compete for the Italian Super Cup at the start of next season, while the champions of Italy will have the right to participate in the European Cup, organized every year too (in 2012 in Imperia).

During the season there are various tournaments such as Lombardy Cup, Piedmont Male Cup, the women's teams of the Epiphany Cup, the Carnival Cup, the Mediterranean Cup and the Trofeo San Rocco. In addition, the Italian National Futsal AMF participated in several events organized by the AMF (Asociacion Mundial de Futsal) and its affiliates.

The Federation is very attentive to the disabled and it decided to set up a special National Male participating also with excellent results in several tournaments, so as to give an opportunity of integration to who is often unfairly discriminated. It is so decided to organize a national championship dedicated to them: from October to February are played the Phases Center / North and Central / South, while in April it is played the national final.

Every year in November, the Federation organizes a conference with a different theme intended to education, which was also joined by prominent members of the CIP (Italian Paralympic Committee).

=== Gold book of FIFS' Championship ===
Year	Men's Championship	Men's Italian Cup	Italian Supercup
2019	Ticinia Novara	Ticinia Novara	Ticinia Novara
2018	Bulè Ticinia Novara	Bulè Ticinia Novara	Bulè Ticinia Novara
2017	Bulè Ticinia Novara	ASD Las Palmas C5 Milano	ASD Las Palmas C5 Milano
2016	Bulè Ticinia Novara	AS Dolceria Valmont Galliate	Bulè Ticinia Novara
2015	Bulè Ticinia Novara	Aurora 2003 Torino	Bulè Ticinia Novara
2014	Bulè Ticinia Novara	Futsal San Giuliano	Futsal San Giuliano
2013	PGM San Lazzaro Grugliasco	FCD Olmi Cesano	FCD Olmi Cesano
2012	Ticinia Novara	New Buffalo Cuggiono	New Buffalo Cuggiono
2011	Saturnio Moncalieri	Bar 3°Tempo Agrate B.	Bar 3°Tempo Agrate B.
2010	R3 Futsal Torino	ODB Rescaldina	R3 Futsal Torino
2009	ASD Hickory Arcore	AC Tenuta Carretta 1999	ASD Futsal Hickory
1998	CSS Spurghi Milano	non disputata	
1997	CSS Spurghi Milano	AS Sesto	
1996	Carrexpress Milano	AS Sesto	
1995	Carrexpress Milano	CSS Spurghi Milano	
1994	Carrexpress Milano	Sporting Turroa	
1993	Danympel Milano	Sporting Turro	
1992	Danympel Milano	Sporting Turro	
1991	CSS Spurghi Milano	Danympel Milano	
1990	Sporting Turro	Danympel Milano	
1989	Sporting Turro	Danympel Milano	
1988	Sporting Turro	CSS Spurghi Milano	

== Hall of fame FIFS ==
Established by FIFA in January 2016, it is the recognition award to players, coaches, managers, referees who have contributed to the history of the Italian Futsal.

=== Coaches ===
- Lino Coppola - Coach of Futsal Pieve Emanuele and of Italian National Major from 1987 to 1991. He led the national team during four editions of the Latin Cup, 2 European Championships, 2 World Championships.
- Mauro Parenti - He coached in four different decades: 80', 90', 2000 and 2010. He was coach of CSS Spurghi Mi, Sporting Turro and dell'FCD Olmi winning 3 league titles (1991-1997-1998), 3 Italian Cups (1988- 1995–2013). From 1998 to 1999 coached the National Male Major, from 2012 to 2013 the National U21 Male and in 2013 the National U23 Male.
- Enrico Belli - Coach of Lainate Futsal from 2010 to 2012, he was Vice-Champion of Italy in 2010 and 2012. From 2010 to 2013 he coached the National Male Major, winning 3 Mundialito Cup.

=== Managers ===
- Luigi Conticini - Entrepreneur of Milano, was the founder in 1987 of the AIFS who was the pioneer of FIFS and the first President of FIFS in 1988; thanks to him Italy took part at the Australia World Championship 1988.
- Giovanni Caminiti - He was the longest-lived president in the history of FIFS from 1988 to 2009, he was among the founders of UEFS in 1988 and vice-president of FIFUSA for the European continent from 1989 to 1993. Under his presidency, he brought in Italy the World Championship FIFUSA in 1991 in Milan, and they were organized, in collaboration with Walt Disney Italy from 1992 to 1996, also 5 editions of Topolino's Trophy.
- Giorgio Chinelli - He was the Secretary - General of FIFS from 1989 to 2002; he was one of the coordinators of the World Championship in 1991 and also of the five editions of the Topolino's Trophy in addition to organizing all federal activities during Caminiti Presidency.

=== Players ===
- Giuseppe Caggiano - Player of the CSS Spurghi Milano from 1988 to 1999, with whom he won three Championship and two Italian Cups; Captain of the Italian National team from 1987 to 1998, in which he played 54 times.
- Giuseppe Bua - Player of the Futsal Hickory Lissone and affiliated since 2009, is the only one in the history of the Football Indoor to have won the Grand Slam in 2009 (Lombardy's Championship - Italian Championship - Italian Super Cup - Euro Cup IFWL). He boasts 6 presences in the Italian National team.
- Giovanni Oliva - Player of the PGM Grugliasco from 2008 to 2014 with whom he won one Championship; furthermore, he was the Captain of the Italian National team from 2008 to 2014 in which he boasts 55 presences. Thanks to his presences he led his National team to the victory of 3 Mundialito Cup Tournament.
- Luca Licini - Player of Ticinia Novara, he is registered in FIFS from June 1991 to date, he has won three championship. He holds the record for presences with the National team (55 appearances) during which he won two Mundialito Cup Tournament (in 2013 and in 2015).
- Stefano Usai - Player of Ticinia Novara, is registered since 2012, he won four Championship (2013-2014-2015-2016), 2 Italian Cup (2015-2016), one Italian Super Cup (2015), he is the Captain of the Italian National team since 2014 and so far, he boasts 50 presences and 2 Mundialito Cup Tournament. He has the record of 7 goals scored in the Final of Italian Cup (2016).

== Organization Chart ==
- Presidente: Axel Paderni
- Presidente Onorario: Maurizio Secchi
- Vicepresidente Vicario: Flavia Valente
- Segretario Generale: Alessandro Chinelli
- Amministratore Federale: Riccardo Paderni
- Giustizia Sportiva: Massimo Corali
